= The Notorious B.I.G. discography =

- Studio albums: 2
- Soundtrack albums: 1
- Compilation albums: 1
- Singles: 27
- Music videos: 15
- Posthumous albums: 3

The discography of the Notorious B.I.G., an American rapper, consists of two studio albums, three posthumous albums, two compilation albums, one soundtrack and 27 singles (including 17 as a featured artist).

== Albums ==
=== Studio albums ===
List of albums, with selected chart positions
Title	Album details	Peak chart positions									Sales	Certifications
Title	Album details	US	US R&B	AUS	CAN	FRA	NLD	NZ	SWE	UK	Sales	Certifications
Ready to Die	Released: September 13, 1994; Label: Bad Boy; Arista; Formats: CD, LP, cassette, digital download	15	3	—	—	118	—	—	—	—	US: 3,870,000	RIAA: 6× Platinum; BPI: Platinum
Life After Death	Released: March 25, 1997; Label: Bad Boy; Arista; Formats: CD, LP, cassette, digital download	1	1	59	3	—	16	28	30	23	US: 5,360,000	RIAA: 11× Platinum; BPI: Platinum; MC: 2× Platinum
"—" denotes a recording that did not chart or was not released in that territory.

=== Posthumous albums ===
List of albums, with selected chart positions
Title	Album details	Peak chart positions							Sales	Certifications
Title	Album details	US	US R&B	US Rap	AUS	CAN	NLD	UK	Sales	Certifications
Born Again	Released: December 7, 1999; Label: Bad Boy; Format: CD, LP, cassette, digital download	1	1	—	—	14	82	70	US: 1,960,000	RIAA: 2× Platinum; BPI: Gold
Duets: The Final Chapter	Released: December 20, 2005; Label: Bad Boy; Formats: CD, LP, digital download	3	3	1	63	13	—	13	US: 1,170,000	RIAA: Platinum; BPI: Gold
The King & I (with Faith Evans)	Released: May 19, 2017; Label: Rhino; Format: Digital download	65	31	24	—	—	—	—	US: 24,000	
"—" denotes a recording that did not chart or was not released in that territory.

=== Compilation albums ===
List of albums, with selected chart positions
Title	Album details	Peak chart positions					Sales	Certifications	
Title	Album details	US	US R&B	US Rap	AUS	UK	Sales	Certifications	
Greatest Hits	Released: March 6, 2007; Label: Bad Boy; Format: CD, LP, digital download	1	1	1	36	57	US: 1,003,000	RIAA: Platinum; ARIA: Platinum; BPI: 2× Platinum	a recording that did not chart or was not released in that territory.

=== Soundtracks ===
List of albums, with selected chart positions
Title	Album details	Peak chart positions					Sales
Title	Album details	US	US R&B	US Rap	AUS	CAN	Sales
Notorious	Released: January 13, 2009; Label: Bad Boy; Format: CD, LP, digital download	4	1	1	68	18	US: 124,490

== Singles ==
=== As lead artist ===
List of singles, with selected chart positions
Title	Year	Peak chart positions										Certifications	Album
Title	Year	US	US R&B	US Rap	AUS	CAN	FRA	NLD	NZ	SWE	UK	Certifications	Album
"Party and Bullshit"	1993	—	—	—	—	—	—	—	—	—	—	RMNZ: Gold	Who's the Man?: Original Motion Picture Soundtrack
"Juicy"	1994	27	14	3	—	—	—	—	—	—	72	RIAA: 6× Platinum; BPI: 3× Platinum; RMNZ: 5× Platinum	Ready to Die
"Big Poppa"	1994	6	4	1	—	—	—	—	—	—	63	RIAA: 6× Platinum; RIAA: Gold (Mastertone); BPI: Platinum; RMNZ: 6× Platinum	Ready to Die
"One More Chance" (including "Stay with Me Remix")	1995	2	1	1	—	7	—	—	48	—	34	RIAA: Platinum; RMNZ: Platinum	Ready to Die
"Hypnotize"	1997	1	1	1	63	3	—	16	15	29	10	RIAA: Platinum; BPI: 3× Platinum; RMNZ: 6× Platinum	Life After Death
"Mo Money Mo Problems" (featuring Mase and Puff Daddy)	1997	1	2	1	10	2	36	1	2	5	6	RIAA: Platinum; ARIA: Gold; BPI: Platinum; RMNZ: 4× Platinum	Life After Death
"Going Back to Cali" (Note: In the United States, "Sky's the Limit" was released as a triple A-side single, along with "Going Back to Cali" and "Kick in the Door".)	1997	26	31	1	—	11	—	75	24	—	35	RIAA: Gold; RMNZ: Gold	Life After Death
"Notorious B.I.G." (featuring Puff Daddy and Lil' Kim)	1999	82	30	—	51	—	95	78	—	44	16	RMNZ: Gold	Born Again
"Dead Wrong" (featuring Eminem)	2000	— (Note: "Dead Wrong" did not enter the Billboard Hot 100, but peaked at number 15 on the Bubbling Under Hot 100 Singles chart.)	39	—	—	—	—	—	—	—	—		Born Again
"Nasty Girl" (featuring P Diddy, Nelly, Jagged Edge, Avery Storm and Jazze Pha)	2005	44	20	9	15	—	22	22	7	40	1	RIAA: Gold; RIAA: Gold (Mastertone); BPI: 2× Platinum; RMNZ: Platinum	Duets: The Final Chapter and Sweatsuit
"Spit Your Game" (featuring Twista, Krayzie Bone, Swizz Beatz, 8 Ball and MJG)	2006	—	68	—	—	—	—	—	—	—	64		Duets: The Final Chapter
"NYC" (with Faith Evans featuring Jadakiss)	2017	—	—	—	—	—	—	—	—	—	—		The King & I
"Legacy" (with Faith Evans)	2017	—	—	—	—	—	—	—	—	—	—		The King & I
"G.O.A.T." (featuring Ty Dolla Sign and Bella Alubo)	2022	—	—	—	—	—	—	—	— (Note: "G.O.A.T." did not enter the NZ Top 40 Singles Chart, but peaked at number 21 on the NZ Hot Singles Chart.)	—	—		Notorious I: The Notorious B.I.G. EP
"—" denotes a recording that did not chart or was not released in that territory.

=== As featured artist ===
List of singles, with selected chart positions
Title	Year	Peak chart positions					Certifications	Album
Title	Year	US	US R&B	US Rap	AUS	UK	Certifications	Album
"Dolly My Baby (Extended Bad Boy Remix)" (Super Cat featuring Biggie, 3rd Eye, Puffy & Mary J. Blige)	1993	—	—	—	—	—		Non-album single
"Flava in Ya Ear (Remix)" (Craig Mack featuring The Notorious B.I.G., Rampage, LL Cool J and Busta Rhymes)	1994	—	—	—	—	—		Bad Boy's 10th Anniversary... The Hits
"Can't You See" (Total featuring The Notorious B.I.G.)	1995	13	3	—	—	43	RIAA: Gold	New Jersey Drive, Vol. 1 (soundtrack) / Total
"The Points" (with Coolio, Redman, Ill Al Skratch, Big Mike, Busta Rhymes, Buckshot and Bone Thugs-n-Harmony)	1995	—	80	—	—	—		Panther (soundtrack)
"Player's Anthem" (with Junior M.A.F.I.A.)	1995	13	7	2	—	—	RIAA: Gold	Conspiracy
"This Time Around" (Michael Jackson featuring The Notorious B.I.G.)	1995	—	— (Note: "This Time Around" did not enter the Hot R&B/Hip-Hop Songs chart, but peaked at number 23 on the R&B/Hip-Hop Airplay chart.)	—	—	—		HIStory: Past, Present and Future, Book I
"Get Money" (with Junior M.A.F.I.A.)	1996	17	4	1	—	63	RIAA: Platinum; BPI: Silver	Conspiracy
"Only You" (112 featuring The Notorious B.I.G., Mase and Puff Daddy)	1996	13	3	—	53	—	RIAA: Platinum; BPI: Silver; RMNZ: Platinum	112
"You Can't Stop the Reign" (Shaquille O'Neal and The Notorious B.I.G.)	1996	—	— (Note: "You Can't Stop the Reign" did not enter the Hot R&B/Hip-Hop Songs chart, but peaked at number 54 on the R&B/Hip-Hop Airplay chart.)	—	—	40		You Can't Stop the Reign
"Been Around the World" (Puff Daddy featuring Mase and The Notorious B.I.G.)	1997	2	7	1	48	20	RIAA: Platinum; RMNZ: Platinum	No Way Out
"It's All About the Benjamins" (Puff Daddy featuring Lil' Kim, the LOX and The Notorious B.I.G.)	1997	2	7	1	—	18		No Way Out
"Victory" (Puff Daddy featuring The Notorious B.I.G. and Busta Rhymes)	1998	19	13	2	—	—	RIAA: Gold	No Way Out
"Runnin' (Dying to Live)" (2Pac featuring The Notorious B.I.G.)	2004	19	11	5	12	17	RMNZ: Gold	Tupac: Resurrection
"Angels" (Diddy-Dirty Money featuring the Notorious B.I.G. and Rick Ross)	2009	— (Note: "Angels" did not enter the Billboard Hot 100, but peaked at number 16 on the Bubbling Under Hot 100 Singles chart.)	71	—	—	—		Last Train to Paris
"—" denotes a recording that did not chart or was not released in that territory.

== Other charted and certified songs ==
List of singles, with selected chart positions and certifications
Title	Year	Peak chart positions			Certifications	Album
Title	Year	US	US R&B	US Rap	Certifications	Album
"Suicidal Thoughts"	1994	—	—	—	RMNZ: Gold	Ready to Die
"Warning"	1994	—	—	—	RMNZ: Gold	Ready to Die
"Runnin' from tha Police" (2Pac featuring the Notorious B.I.G., Dramacydal, Stretch and Buju Banton)	1995	81	57	13		One Million Strong
"Who Shot Ya?"	1995	—	—	—	BPI: Silver; RMNZ: Platinum	B-Side of "Big Poppa"
"Notorious Thugs" (featuring Bone Thugs-n-Harmony)	1997	—	— (Note: "Notorious Thugs" did not enter the Hot R&B/Hip-Hop Songs chart, but peaked at number 36 on the R&B/Hip-Hop Airplay chart.)	—	BPI: Silver; RMNZ: 3× Platinum	Life After Death
"Nasty Boy"	1997	—	— (Note: "Nasty Boy" did not enter the Hot R&B/Hip-Hop Songs chart, but peaked at number 43 on the R&B/Hip-Hop Airplay chart.)	—		Life After Death
"Ten Crack Commandments"	1997	—	—	—	RMNZ: Gold	Life After Death
"Realest Niggas" (with 50 Cent)	2003	— (Note: "Realest Niggas" did not enter the Billboard Hot 100, but peaked at number six on the Bubbling Under Hot 100 Singles chart.)	30	21		Bad Boys II (soundtrack) / God's Plan
"Victory 2004" (P Diddy featuring the Notorious B.I.G, 50 Cent, Lloyd Banks and Busta Rhymes)	2004	—	61	—		Bad Boy's 10th Anniversary... The Hits
"Hold Ya Head" (featuring Bob Marley)	2005	—	— (Note: "Hold Ya Head" did not enter the Hot R&B/Hip-Hop Songs, but peaked at number 16 on the Bubbling Under R&B/Hip-Hop Singles chart.)	—	RMNZ: Gold	Duets: The Final Chapter
"Whatchu Want?" (featuring Jay-Z)	2005	—	76	—		Duets: The Final Chapter
"Mi Casa" (featuring R. Kelly and Charlie Wilson)	2005	—	— (Note: "Mi Casa" did not enter the Hot R&B/Hip-Hop Songs, but peaked at number four on the Bubbling Under R&B/Hip-Hop Singles chart.)	—		Duets: The Final Chapter
"1970 Somethin'"	2005	—	—	—	RMNZ: Platinum	Duets: The Final Chapter
"Would You Die for Me?" (featuring Lil Kim and Puff Daddy)	2013	—	— (Note: "Would You Die for Me?" did not enter the Hot R&B/Hip-Hop Songs, but peaked at number six on the Bubbling Under R&B/Hip-Hop Singles chart.)	—		Born Again
"Old Thing Back" (with Matoma, featuring Ja Rule and Ralph Tresvant)	2015	—	— (Note: "Old Thing Back" did not enter the Hot R&B/Hip-Hop Songs, but peaked at number eight on the Bubbling Under R&B/Hip-Hop Singles chart.)	—	RIAA: Gold; BPI: Gold; RMNZ: 3× Platinum	Hakuna Matoma
"—" denotes a recording that did not chart or was not released in that territory.

== Appearances ==
Year	Song	Other performer(s)	Album
1992	"A Buncha Niggas"	Heavy D & the Boyz, Guru, 3rd Eye, Busta Rhymes, Rob-O	Blue Funk
1993	"Leave a Message"	Mary J. Blige, Puffy, K-Ci Hailey, Martin Lawrence, Tim Dog	What's the 411? Remix
1993	"Real Love (Remix)"	Mary J. Blige	What's the 411? Remix
1993	"What's the 411? (Remix)"	Mary J. Blige, K-Ci Hailey	What's the 411? Remix
1993	"Buddy X" (Falcon & Fabian Remix)	Neneh Cherry	12"
1994	"How Many Ways" (Bad Boy Remix)	The Braxtons, Puffy	12"
1994	"Jam Session"	Heavy D, Troo-Kula	NBA Jam Session
1994	"Da B-Sde"	Da Brat, Jermaine Dupri	Fa All Y'all 12" {Special Editions} / Bad Boys (soundtrack)
1994	"Let's Get It On"	Eddie F, 2Pac, Heavy D, Grand Puba, Spunk Bigga	Eddie F & the Untouchables Present: Let's Get It On – The Album
1994	"Cunt Renaissance"	R.A. the Rugged Man	Night of the Bloody Apes ~~Unreleased~~
1994	"Who's the Man?"	Ed Lover & Doctor Dré	Back Up Off Me!
1994	"Stop the Breaks"	Ron G, Raekwon, KRS-One, Killa Sin, O.C.	It's On! Part 2
1994	"Think Big"	Pudgee tha Phat Bastard, Lord Tariq	12" ~~Unreleased~~
1995	"4 My Peeps" / "4 My Peeps" (Remix)	Red Hot Lover Tone, M.O.P., Organized Konfusion	#1 Player
1995	"All Men Are Dogs" (Nine Dog MC's Mix)	Red Bandit, Grand Daddy I.U., Grand Puba, Mackwell, Positive K, Pudgee tha Phat Bastard, Raggedy Man, Snagglepuss	12"
1995	"Runnin' from the Police"	2Pac, Dramacydal, Stretch, Buju Banton	One Million Strong
1995	"Realms of the Junior M.A.F.I.A."	Junior M.A.F.I.A., Jamal	Conspiracy
1995	"Oh My Lord"	Junior M.A.F.I.A.	Conspiracy
1995	"(You to Be) Happy"	R. Kelly	R. Kelly
1996	"Bust a Nut"	Luke	Uncle Luke
1996	"Brooklyn's Finest"	Jay-Z	Reasonable Doubt
1996	"Young G's Perspective"	Blackjack, Junior M.A.F.I.A.	Addicted to Drama
1996	"Drugs"	Lil Kim	Hard Core
1996	"You'll See"	The LOX	Bad Boy Promotional Tape
1997	"Bad Boy Freestyle"	The LOX, Funkmaster Flex	The Mix Tape, Vol. II
1997	"Keep Your Hands High"	Tracey Lee	Many Facez
1997	"Young Gs"	Puff Daddy, Jay-Z, Kelly Price	No Way Out
1999	"Real Niggas"	Puff Daddy, Lil Kim	Forever
1999	"Live Freestyle"	Funkmaster Flex, Big Kap, 2Pac	The Tunnel
2000	"Why You Tryin' to Play Me?"	Aaron Hall	The Projects Presents: Balhers Forever
2000	"16 Bars"	Rawkus Records	Lyricist Lounge 2
2000	"The Wickedest"	Mister Cee, Funkmaster Flex	The Mix Tape, Vol. IV
2001	"Unbreakable"	Michael Jackson	Invincible
2002	"A Dream"	Jay-Z, Faith Evans	The Blueprint 2: The Gift & the Curse
2002	"Unfoolish"	Ashanti	We Invented the Remix
2002	"Notorious B.I.G. (Remix)"	P. Diddy, Lil Kim	We Invented the Remix
2002	"Woke Up in the Morning (Remix)"	Carl Thomas	We Invented the Remix
2004	”Modern Day Gangsters”	Busta Rhymes, Labba, Baby Sham	Surrender
2004	”3 B’s”	Busta Rhymes, Buju Banton	Surrender
2005	"Y'all Know Who Killed Him"	Black Rob	The Black Rob Report
2006	"Duck Down"	Trick Daddy, Plies	Back by Thug Demand
2006	"Deadly Combination (Remix)"	Big L, 2Pac	The Archives 1996–2000
2006	"Three Bricks"	Ghostface Killah, Raekwon	Fishscale
2007	"Relax and Take Notes"	8 Ball & MJG, Project Pat	Ridin High
2008	"Cash Money"	Bone Brothers	Bone Brothers III
2009	"Bone Thugs" (Bone, Bone, Bone Remix)	Bone Thugs-N-Harmony	Uni5 the Prequel: The Untold Story
2010	"Belize"	Shyne, Bob Marley	Gangland
2010	"Living Better Now"	Jamie Foxx, Rick Ross	Best Night of My Life
2011	"I Knock You Out"	Busta Rhymes	Respect the Conglomerate
2012	"Flip Dat Shit"	Onyx, Naughty By Nature, 3rd Eye	Cold Case Files Vol. 2
2017	"Whatcha Gon' Do"	Puff Daddy, Rick Ross	No Way Out 2
2018	"A No No"	Mariah Carey	Caution

Music Videos
Year	Title	Artist(s)	Album	Cite
1993	Dolly My Baby (Bad Boy Remix)	Supercat, 3rd Eye, Puff Daddy, Mary J. Blige	Non-album single	
1993	Party n Bullshit	Notorious B.I.G.	Who's the Man? (soundtrack)	
1994	Flava in Ya Ear Remix	Craig Mack, Notorious B.I.G., LL Cool J, Rampage, Busta Rhymes	Non-album single	
1994	Juicy	Notorious B.I.G.	Ready to Die	
1994	Big Poppa	Notorious B.I.G.	Ready to Die	
1994	Warning	Notorious B.I.G.	Ready to Die	
1995	Can't You See	Total	Total	
1995	The Points	Various Artists	Panther (soundtrack)	
1995	One More Chance/Stay With Me (Remix)	Notorious B.I.G.	Non-album single	
1995	Get Money	Junior M.A.F.I.A	Conspiracy	
1996	Player's Anthem	Junior M.A.F.I.A	Conspiracy	
1996	Only You (Remix)	112, Mase	112	
1996	You Can't Stop the Reign {no appearance}	Shaquille O'Neal	You Can't Stop the Reign	
1997	Hypnotize	Notorious B.I.G.	Life After Death	
1997	Mo Money Mo Problems {no appearance}	Notorious B.I.G., Mase, Puff Daddy	Life After Death	
1997	All About the Benjamins (Remix) {no appearance}	Puff Daddy, Lil Kim, The Lox	No Way Out	
1997	Sky's the Limit {no appearance}	Notorious B.I.G., 112	Life After Death	
1997	Been Around the World {no appearance}	Puff Daddy, Mase	No Way Out	
1998	Victory {no appearance}	Puff Daddy, Busta Rhymes	No Way Out	
1999	Notorious B.I.G. {no appearance}	Notorious B.I.G., Lil Kim, Puff Daddy	Born Again	
1999	Dead Wrong {no appearance}	Notorious B.I.G., Eminem	Born Again	
2005	Nasty Girl {no appearance}	Notorious B.I.G., Nelly, Avery Storm	Duets: Final Chapter	
2006	Spit Yo Game {no appearance}	Notorious B.I.G., Twista, Krayzie Bone	Duets: Final Chapter	
2006	Hold Ya Head {no appearance}	Notorious B.I.G., Bob Marley	Duets: Final Chapter	

== See also ==
- Junior M.A.F.I.A.#Discography
- List of songs recorded by the Notorious B.I.G.
