= List of songs recorded by the Notorious B.I.G. =

The following is a list of recorded songs by American rapper The Notorious B.I.G., prior to his death in 1997 at age 24.

== List ==
Song	Other performer(s)	Producer(s)	Original release	Year	Ref.
"All Men Are Dogs" (Nine Dog MC's Mix)	Bandit, Grand Daddy I.U., Grand Puba, Mackwell, Positive K, Pudgee tha Phat Bastard, Raggedy Man, Snagglepuss	producers	"All Men Are Dogs" single	1995	
"Angels"	Diddy, Rick Ross	Diddy, Mario Winans	Last Train to Paris	2010	
"Another"	Lil Kim	Puff Daddy, Stevie J	Life After Death	1997	
"Da B Side"	Da Brat, Jermaine Dupri	Jermaine Dupri	Bad Boys: Music From the Motion Picture	1995	
"Be the Realist"	Trapp, 2Pac		Stop the Gunfight	1997	
"Been Around the World"	Puff Daddy, Mase	Puff Daddy, D-Dot, Amen-Ra	No Way Out	1997	
"Beef"	Mobb Deep	Havoc	Duets: The Final Chapter	2005	
"Belize"	Shyne, Bob Marley		Gangland	2010	
"Big Booty Hoes"	Too Short	Daven "Prestige" Vanderpool	Born Again	1999	
"Big Poppa"	—	Chucky Thompson, Puff Daddy (co.)	Ready to Die	1994	
"Biggie"	Junior M.A.F.I.A.	Nashiem Myrick	Born Again	1999	
"Bone Thugs"	Bone Thugs-N-Harmony		Uni5 the Prequel: The Untold Story	2009	
"Breakin' Old Habits"	T.I., Slim Thug	Chink Santana	Duets: The Final Chapter	2005	
"Brooklyn's Finest"	Jay-Z	Clark Kent	Reasonable Doubt	1996	
"Buddy X" (Falcon & Fabian Remix)	Neneh Cherry		Buddy X (Single)	1993	
"A Buncha Niggas"	Heavy D & the Boyz, Gang Starr, 3rd Eye, Busta Rhymes, Rob-O	DJ Premier	Blue Funk	1993	
"Bust a Nut"	Luke	DJ Spin	Uncle Luke	1996	
"Can I Get Witcha"	Lil Cease	Chucky Thompson	Born Again	1999	
"Can't You See"	Total	Puff Daddy	Total	1995	
"Cash Money"	Bone Brothers	Vince V.	Bone Brothers III	2008	
"Come On"	Sadat X	DJ Clark Kent	Born Again	1999	
"Crush On You"	Lil Kim, Lil Cease	Andraeo Heard	Hard Core	1996	
"Cunt Renaissance"	R.A. the Rugged Man	Marc "Nigga" Nilez	Legendary Classics Volume 1	2009	
"Dangerous MC's"	Mark Curry, Snoop Dogg, Busta Rhymes	Nottz	Born Again	1999	
"Dead Wrong"	Eminem	Chucky Thompson, Mario Winans	Born Again	1999	
"Deadly Combination"	Big L, 2Pac		The Archives 1996–2000	2006	
"Dolly My Baby" (Bad Boy Extended Mix)	Super Cat, 3rd Eye, Puff Daddy, Mary J. Blige	3rd Eye, Puffy, Trevor Sparks	Dolly My Baby single	1993	
"Dom Perignon"	Little Shawn	Easy Mo Bee	New York Undercover	1995	
"Drugs"	Lil Kim	Fabian Hamilton	Hard Core	1996	
"Duck Down"	Trick Daddy, Plies		Back by Thug Demand	2006	
"Everyday Struggle"	—	Bluez Brothers	Ready to Die	1994	
"Everything to Me" (Remix)	Monica, Missy Elliott	producers	—	2010	
"Flava In Ya Ear" (Remix)	Craig Mack, Rampage, LL Cool J, Busta Rhymes, Puff Daddy	Easy Mo Bee	Bad Boy's 10th Anniversary... The Hits	2004	
"Flip Dat Shit"	Onyx, Naughty By Nature, 3rd Eye	Chyskillz	Cold Case Files Vol. 2	2012	
"Freestyle"	The LOX, Funkmaster Flex	Funkmaster Flex	The Mix Tape, Vol. II	1997	
"Friend of Mine"	—	Easy Mo Bee	Ready to Die	1994	
"Fuck You Tonight"	R. Kelly		Life After Death	1997	
"Get Money"	Lil Kim	Ez Elpee	Conspiracy	1995	
"Get Your Grind On"	Big Pun, Fat Joe, Freeway	Sean C & LV	Duets: The Final Chapter	2005	
"Gimme the Loot"	—	Easy Mo Bee	Ready to Die	1994	
"Going Back to Cali"	—	Easy Mo Bee	Life After Death	1997	
"The Grind"	50 Cent	Statik Selektah	The Empire Strikes Back	2006	
"Guaranteed Raw"	—		Notorious: Music Inspired by the Motion Picture	2009	
"Hold Ya Head"	Bob Marley	Clinton Sparks	Duets: The Final Chapter	2005	
"Hope You Niggas Sleep"	Hot Boys, Big Tymers	Mannie Fresh	Born Again	1999	
"House of Pain"	2Pac, Stretch		Ready 2 Die	1993	
"How Many Ways" (Bad Boy Remix)	Toni Braxton	Vincent Herbert, Puff Daddy, Chucky Thompson	How Many Ways single	1994	
"Hustler's Story"	Scarface, Akon, Big Gee	J-Dub, Mario Winans, Reefa, Suga Mike	Duets: The Final Chapter	2005	
"Hypnotize"	—	D-Dot, Amen-Ra	Life After Death	1997	
"I Got a Story to Tell"	—	Buckwild, Chucky Thompson	Life After Death	1997	
"I Love the Dough"	Jay-Z, Angela Winbush	Easy Mo Bee	Life After Death	1997	
"I Really Want to Show You"	Nas, K-Ci & JoJo	Andreao Heard	Born Again	1999	
"I'm With Whateva" [B.I.G. is not presented on regular (2:33) album version of the track]	Lil Wayne, Juelz Santana, Jim Jones	Stevie J	Duets: The Final Chapter	2005	
"If I Should Die Before I Wake"	Black Rob, Beanie Sigel, Ice Cube	Henri Charlemagne, Coptic, D-Dot	Born Again	1999	
"It Has Been Said" [actually B.I.G. presented on this track only with a few words]	Eminem, Obie Trice, Diddy	Eminem	Duets: The Final Chapter	2005	
"It's All About the Benjamins (Remix)"	The LOX, Lil' Kim, Diddy				
"It's All I Had"	—		The Show: The Soundtrack	1994	
"Jam Session"	Heavy D, Troo Kula		NBA Jam	1994	
"Juicy"	—	Poke, Puff Daddy (co.)	Ready to Die	1994	
"Just a Memory"	Clipse	Scram Jones	Duets: The Final Chapter	2005	
"Just Playing (Dreams)"	—	Rashad Smith	Ready to Die: The Remaster	1994	
"Keep Your Hands High"	Tracey Lee	D-Dot, Amen-Ra	album	1997	
"Kick In the Door"	—	DJ Premier	Life After Death	1997	
"Last Day"	The LOX	Havoc, Puff Daddy, Stevie J	Life After Death	1997	
"Leave a Message"	Mary J. Blige, Puff Daddy, K-Ci Hailey, Martin Lawrence, Tim Dog	Tony Dofat	What's the 411? Remix	1993	
"Let Me Get Down"	Craig Mack, G-Dep, Missy Elliott	D-Dot	Born Again	1999	
"Let's Get It On"	Eddie F, 2Pac, Heavy D, Grand Puba, Spunk Bigga		Let's Get It On: The Album	1993	
"Let's Talk"	Omarion, Rick Ross	Ayo the Producer	Self Made Vol. 2	2012	
"Live Freestyle"	2Pac		The Tunnel	1999	
"Live 4 the Funk"	Redman, Nate Dogg	Bosko	Pancake & Syrup	2010	
"Living In Pain"	2Pac, Nas, Mary J. Blige	Just Blaze	Duets: The Final Chapter	2005	
"Living the Life"	Snoop Dogg, Ludacris, Faith Evans, Cheri Dennis, Bobby Valentino	Coptic Sounds	Duets: The Final Chapter	2005	
"Long Kiss Goodnight"	—	RZA	Life After Death	1997	
"Love No Ho"	—		Notorious: Music Inspired by the Motion Picture	2009	
"Machine Gun Funk"	—	Easy Mo Bee	Ready to Die	1994	
"Me & My Bitch"	—	Bluez Brothers, Chucky Thompson, Puff Daddy	Ready to Die	1994	
"Mi Casa"	R. Kelly, Charlie Wilson	J-Dub, Mario Winans, DJ Green Lantern	Duets: The Final Chapter	2005	
"Microphone Murderer"	—		Notorious: Music Inspired by the Motion Picture	2009	
"Miss U" ft. 112	—	Kay-Gee	Life After Death	1997	
"Mo Money Mo Problems"	Mase, Puff Daddy	Stevie J, Puff Daddy	Life After Death	1997	
"My Downfall"	DMC	July Six, Nashiem Myrick, Puff Daddy	Life After Death	1997	
"Nasty Boy"	—	Puff Daddy, Stevie J	Life After Death	1997	
"Nasty Girl"	Diddy, Jagged Edge, Avery Storm	Jazze Pha	Duets: The Final Chapter	2005	
"Niggas"	—	Mario Winans, Clemont Mack, Ramahn Herbert	Born Again	1999	
"Niggas Bleed"	—	Nashiem Myrick, July Six, Puff Daddy, Stevie J	Life After Death	1997	
"Notorious B.I.G."	Puff Daddy, Lil Kim	Daven "Prestige" Vanderpool	Born Again	1999	
"Notorious B.I.G." (Remix)	Lil Kim	D-Dot	We Invented the Remix	2002	
"Notorious Thugs"	Bone Thugs-n-Harmony	Stevie J, Puff Daddy	Life After Death	1997	
"One More Chance"	—	Bluez Brothers, Chucky Thompson, Puff Daddy	Ready to Die	1994	
"One More Chance" (Stay With Me Remix)	Faith Evans, Mary J. Blige	Diddy, Rashad Smith	One More Chance single	1995	
"One More Chance" (The Legacy Remix)	Cristopher Wallace, Jr., Faith Evans		Notorious: Music Inspired by the Motion Picture	2009	
"Only You"	112	Sean Combs, Stevie J	112	1996	
"Party and Bullshit"	—	Easy Mo Bee	Who's the Man? (soundtrack)	1993	
"Playa Hater"	—	Puff Daddy, Stevie J	Life After Death	1997	
"Player's Anthem"	Junior M.A.F.I.A.	Clark Kent	Conspiracy	1995	
"The Points"	Big Mike, Bone Thugs-n-Harmony, Buckshot, Busta Rhymes, Coolio, Digable Planets, Heltah Skeltah, Ill Al Skratch, Jamal Phillips, Menace Clan, Redman	Easy Mo Bee	Panther: The Original Motion Picture Soundtrack	1995	
"Rap Phenomenon"	Method Man, Redman	DJ Premier	Born Again	1999	
"Ready to Die"	—	Easy Mo Bee	Ready to Die	1994	
"Real Love (Remix)"	Mary J. Blige	Daddy-O	What's the 411? Remix	1993	
"Real Niggas"	Puff Daddy, Lil Kim	D-Dot	Forever	1999	
"Realest Niggas"	50 Cent		Bad Boys II	2003	
"Relax and Take Notes"	8Ball & MJG, Project Pat	DJ Nasty & LVM	Ridin High	2007	
"Respect"	—	Poke, Puff Daddy	Ready to Die	1994	
"Runnin' (Dying to Live)"	2Pac	Eminem	Tupac Resurrection: Music From and Inspired by the Motion Picture	2003	
"Runnin' (From tha Police)"	2Pac, Dramacydal, Buju Banton, Stretch	Easy Mo Bee	One Million Strong	1995	
"Running Your Mouth"	Fabolous, Busta Rhymes, Snoop Dogg, Nate Dogg	Soopafly	Greatest Hits	2007	
"Sky's the Limit"	112	Clark Kent	Life After Death	1997	
"Somebody's Gotta Die"	—	Nashiem Myrick, July Six, Puff Daddy	Life After Death	1997	
"Spit Your Game"	Twista, Krayzie Bone, 8Ball & MJG	Swizz Beatz	Duets: The Final Chapter	2005	
"Stop the Breaks"	DJ Ron G, Raekwon, KRS-One, Killa Sin, O.C.		—	1994	
"Stop the Gunfight"	Trapp, 2Pac		Stop the Gunfight	1997	
"Suicidal Thoughts"	—	Lord Finesse	Ready to Die	1994	
"Ten Crack Commandments"	—	DJ Premier	Life After Death	1997	
"Things Done Changed"	—	Darnell Scott	Ready to Die	1994	
"Think Big"	Pudgee tha Phat Bastard, Lord Tariq		—	1994	
"This Time Around"	Michael Jackson	Dallas Austin, Michael Jackson, Bruce Swedien, Rene Moore	HIStory: Past, Present and Future, Book I	1995	
"Three Bricks"	Ghostface Killah, Raekwon	Cool & Dre, Diddy (co.)	Fishscale	2006	
"Tonight"	Mobb Deep, Joe Hooker	Cornbread	Born Again	1999	
"Ultimate Rush"	Missy Elliott	Scott Storch	Duets: The Final Chapter	2005	
"Unbelievable"	—	DJ Premier	Ready to Die	1994	
"Unbreakable"	Michael Jackson	Michael Jackson, Rodney Jerkins	Invincible	2001	
"Unfoolish" (Remix)	Ashanti	Irv Gotti, 7 Aurelius	We Invented the Remix	2002	
"Victory"	Puff Daddy, Busta Rhymes	Puff Daddy, Stevie J	No Way Out	1997	
"Victory 2004"	P. Diddy, Busta Rhymes, 50 Cent, Lloyd Banks	Stevie J	Bad Boy's 10th Anniversary... The Hits	2004	
"Wake Up"	Korn	Jonathon David, Atticus Ross	Duets: The Final Chapter	2005	
"Want That Old Thing Back"	Ja Rule, Ralph Tresvant	Jon Boy, Stevie J, Diddy (co.)	Greatest Hits	2007	
"Warning"	—	Easy Mo Bee	Ready to Die	1994	
"The What"	Method Man	Easy Mo Bee	Ready to Die	1994	
"Whatchu Want"	Jay-Z	Danja	Duets: The Final Chapter	2005	
"What's Beef?"	—	July Six, Nashiem Myrick, Paragon	Life After Death	1997	
"What's the 411? (Remix)"	Mary J. Blige, K-Ci Hailey	Tumblin' Dice	What's the 411? Remix	1993	
"Who Shot Ya?"	—	Nashiem Myrick, Puff Daddy (co.)	Ready to Die: The Remaster and Born Again	1994	
"The World Is Filled..."	Puff Daddy, Too Short	D-Dot	Life After Death	1997	
"Would You Die For Me?"	Lil Kim, Puff Daddy	Daven "Prestige" Vanderpool	Born Again	1999	
"What's Goin' On?"	Termanology, Black Rob		Hood Politics III: Unsigned Hype	2005	
"Who's the Man?"	Ed Lover, Doctor Dré, King Just		Back Up Off Me!	1994	
"Why You Tryin' to Play Me"	Aaron Hall		Balhers Forever	2000	
"The Wickedest"	Funkmaster Flex, Mister Cee	Mister Cee	The Mix Tape, Vol. IV	2000	
"Woke Up In the Morning" (Remix)	Carl Thomas	P. Diddy, Mario Winans, Joe Hooker	We Invented the Remix	2002	
"Y'all Know Who Killed Him"	Black Rob	D-Dot	The Black Rob Report	2003	
"You Can't Stop the Reign"	Shaquille O'Neal	Chris Large	You Can't Stop the Reign	1996	
"(You to Be) Be Happy"	R. Kelly	R. Kelly	R. Kelly	1995	
"You'll See"	The LOX		Bad Boy Promotional Tape	1996	
"You're Nobody (Til Somebody Kills You)"	—	Puff Daddy, Stevie J, DJ Enuff, Jiv Poss	Life After Death	1997	
"Young G's"	Puff Daddy, Jay-Z, Kelly Price	Rashad Smith	No Way Out	1997	
"Young G's Perspective"	Blackjack, Junior M.A.F.I.A.		Addictid to Drama	1996	
"4 My Peeps"	Red Hot Lover Tone, M.O.P., Organized Konfusion		#1 Player	1994	
"16 Bars"	—	—	Lyricist Lounge 2	2000	
"1970 Somethin'"	The Game, Faith Evans	Dre & Vidal, Static Major	Duets: The Final Chapter	2005	
