= Notorious (soundtrack) =

Notorious: Music from and Inspired by the Original Motion Picture

Soundtrack album by The Notorious B.I.G.
- Released: January 13, 2009
- Genre: Hip-hop
- Length: 1:07:45
- Label: Bad Boy; Fox Searchlight
- Producer: Sean "P. Diddy" Combs (also exec.); Voletta Wallace (exec.); Mark Pitts (exec.); The Notorious B.I.G. (exec.); Harve "Joe Hooker" Pierre (co-exec.); Faith Evans (co-exec.); Wayne Barrow (co-exec.); Stevie J; Deric "D-Dot" Angelettie; Ron "Amen-Ra" Lawrence; Richard "Younglord" Frierson; Daven "Prestige" Vanderpool; Jean "Poke" Olivier; Easy Mo Bee; Rashad Smith; Kanye West; Plain Pat; Needlz; DJ Premier; Carlos "Six July" Broady; Nashiem Myrick; Danny Elfman; The Hitman DJ 50 Gran

The Notorious B.I.G. chronology
Greatest Hits (2007)	Notorious: Music from and Inspired by the Original Motion Picture (2009)	The King & I (2017)

Singles from Notorious: Music from and Inspired by the Original Motion Picture
- 1. "Letter to B.I.G." Released: April 7, 2009

Professional ratings
Aggregate scores
Source	Rating
Metacritic	74/100
Review scores
Source	Rating
AllMusic	4/5 stars
Entertainment Weekly	B
HipHopDX	0/5
Now	3/5 stars
IGN	6.7/10
RapReviews	8.5/10
Rolling Stone	2.5/5 stars

Notorious: Music from and Inspired by the Original Motion Picture is the official soundtrack to the 2009 biopic film Notorious based on the life and death of American rapper the Notorious B.I.G. It features mostly his previously heard songs, inclusively the ones harder to find such as "Party and Bullshit" and "One More Chance (Remix)". It includes two original songs "Brooklyn Go Hard" by Jay-Z and a tribute to the rapper by Jadakiss and widow Faith Evans called "Letter to B.I.G.", as well as three unreleased demos by him and a song with Christopher "CJ" Wallace Jr., his son. "Notorious Thugs", "Notorious B.I.G.", "One More Chance (Remix)", "Brooklyn Go Hard", "Kick in the Door", "What's Beef", "The World Is Filled...", "One More Chance / The Legacy Remix" and "Love No Ho" do not feature in the movie, but are included on the album.

The album debuted at number four on the US Billboard 200, the highest debut of the week, with opening sales of 43,000. By March 2009, the album sold 124,490 copies.

== Track listing ==
Notorious soundtrack track listing, according to Bad Boy Records:

No.	Title	Writer(s)	Producer(s)	Length
1.	"Notorious Thugs" (featuring Bone Thugs-n-Harmony; from Life After Death)	Christopher Wallace; Sean "Puffy" Combs; Steve Howse; Steve Jordan; Anthony Henderson; Byron McCane	Combs; Stevie J	6:05
2.	"Hypnotize" (featuring Pamela Long; from Life After Death)	Wallace; Deric "D-Dot" Angelettie; Randy Alpert; Ron "Amen-Ra" Lawrence; Combs; Andy Armer	Deric "D-Dot" Angelettie; Lawrence; Combs; Richard "Younglord" Frierson (add.)	3:49
3.	"Notorious B.I.G." (featuring Lil' Kim and Puff Daddy; from Born Again)	Wallace; Daven "Prestige" Vanderpool; John Taylor; Nicholas James; Simon Le Bon	Vanderpool; P. Diddy	3:12
4.	"Juicy" (from Ready to Die)	Wallace; James Mtume; Jean-Claude "Poke" Olivier	Poke; Combs	5:01
5.	"Party and Bullshit" (from Who's the Man?: Original Motion Picture Soundtrack)	Wallace; Hal Davis; Osten Harvey; Willie Hutch; Berry Gordy; Bob West	Easy Mo Bee	3:37
6.	"Warning" (from Ready to Die)	Wallace; Hal David; Harvey; Burt Bacharach	Easy Mo Bee	3:39
7.	"One More Chance/Stay with Me" (remix; featuring Faith Evans; from Greatest Hits)	Wallace	Rashad Smith; Combs	4:28
8.	"Brooklyn Go Hard" (Jay-Z featuring Santigold; previously unreleased)	Shawn Carter; Kanye West; Santi White	West; Plain Pat (co.)	3:58
9.	"Letter to B.I.G." (Jadakiss featuring Faith Evans; previously unreleased)	Jason Phillips; Khari Cain; Patrick Grant; Duran Ramos; Faith Evans; Gwen Guthrie	Needlz	4:00
10.	"Kick in the Door" (from Life After Death)	Wallace; Jalacy Hawkins; Chris Martin	DJ Premier	3:34
11.	"What's Beef?" (from Life After Death)	Wallace; Nashiem Myrick; Carlos "Six July" Broady	Broady; Myrick	5:12
12.	"The World Is Filled..." (featuring Puff Daddy and Too $hort; from Life After Death)	Wallace; Angelette; Kit Walker; Combs; Todd Shaw	D-Dot; Combs	4:55
13.	"One More Chance (The Legacy Remix)" (featuring C. J. Wallace and Faith Evans; previously unreleased)	Wallace	Smith; Combs	4:30
14.	"The Notorious Theme" (composed by Danny Elfman; previously unreleased)	Danny Elfman	Elfman	2:07
15.	"Microphone Murderer" (demo; previously unreleased)	Wallace; David Porter	The Hitman DJ 50 Gran	2:04
16.	"Guaranteed Raw" (demo; previously unreleased)	Wallace; Mark James; Michael Small; Nathaniel Hall	The Hitman DJ 50 Gran	3:41
17.	"Love No Ho" (original demo version; previously unreleased)	Wallace; Joe Sample; John Guerin; Larry Carlton; Max Bennett; Tom Scott	The Hitman DJ 50 Gran	3:55

== Charts ==
Chart performance for the Notorious soundtrack
Chart (2009)	Peak position
Australian Albums (ARIA)	68
Canadian Albums Chart	18
Top Canadian R&B/Hip-Hop Albums	4
US Billboard 200	4
US Top R&B/Hip-Hop Albums (Billboard)	1
US Top Rap Albums (Billboard)	1

== Certifications ==
Certifications for Notorious: Music from and Inspired by the Original Motion Picture
Region	Certification	Certified units/sales
New Zealand (RMNZ)	Gold	7,500^{‡}
^{‡} Sales+streaming figures based on certification alone.
