= Greatest Hits (The Notorious B.I.G. album) =

Greatest hits album by The Notorious B.I.G.
- Released: March 6, 2007
- Recorded: 1994–1996
- Genre: Hip-hop
- Length: 76:16
- Labels: Bad Boy; Atlantic

The Notorious B.I.G. chronology
Duets: The Final Chapter (2005)	Greatest Hits (2007)	Notorious (2009)

Professional ratings
Review scores
Source	Rating
About.com	3/5 stars
AllMusic	3/5 stars
RapReviews	(8/10)
Rolling Stone	1/5 stars
The Skinny	4/5 stars
Stylus Magazine	B−

Greatest Hits is a compilation album by American rapper the Notorious B.I.G. The album was released on March 6, 2007 by Bad Boy Records and Atlantic Records, three days before the 10th anniversary of his death.

The album was criticized for not containing many of the Notorious B.I.G.'s biggest hits, including: "Mo Money Mo Problems", "Going Back to Cali", "Player's Anthem" and "Sky's the Limit". It was also criticized as an unnecessary release, given the limited amount of material which the Notorious B.I.G. released in his lifetime and the inferior quality of his posthumously-published work.

Greatest Hits debuted on the U.S. Billboard 200 at number one in the issue dated March 14, 2007, with 100,000 copies sold in its first week of release. As of 2019, it is the last greatest hits album to debut at the number one position on the Billboard 200. It is B.I.G's 3rd US #1 on the Billboard 200.

The album sold 178,702 units in four weeks. The album has been certified Platinum by both the BPI and RIAA and has sold over 1,003,000 copies in the US to date.

== Track listing ==
No.	Title	Source album	Length
1.	"Juicy"	Ready to Die (1994)	5:01
2.	"Big Poppa"	Ready to Die	4:09
3.	"Hypnotize" (featuring Pam from Total)	Life After Death (1997)	3:50
4.	"One More Chance (Stay With Me Remix)" (featuring Faith Evans and Mary J. Blige)	Bad Boy's Greatest Hits Volume 1 (1998) (originally from Ready to Die)	4:28
5.	"Get Money" (with Junior M.A.F.I.A.)	Conspiracy (1995)	4:34
6.	"Warning"	Ready to Die	3:39
7.	"Dead Wrong" (featuring Eminem)	Born Again (1999)	4:57
8.	"Who Shot Ya?"	Ready to Die - The Remaster and Born Again	5:16
9.	"Ten Crack Commandments"	Life After Death	3:23
10.	"Notorious Thugs" (featuring Bone Thugs-N-Harmony)	Life After Death	6:07
11.	"Notorious B.I.G." (featuring Lil' Kim and Diddy)	Born Again	3:11
12.	"Nasty Girl" (featuring Diddy, Nelly, Jagged Edge, and Avery Storm)	Duets: The Final Chapter (2005)	4:46
13.	"Unbelievable"	Ready to Die	3:40
14.	"Niggas Bleed"	Life After Death	4:51
15.	"Running Your Mouth" (featuring Snoop Dogg, Fabolous, Nate Dogg, and Busta Rhymes)	previously unreleased	3:33
16.	"Want That Old Thing Back" (featuring Ja Rule and Ralph Tresvant)	previously unreleased	4:58
17.	"Fuck You Tonight" (featuring R. Kelly)	Life After Death	5:44
Total length:			76:16

Japanese bonus track
No.	Title	Source album	Length
18.	"Mo Money Mo Problems" (featuring Puff Daddy and Mase)	Life After Death	4:17
Total length:			80:33

== Charts ==
=== Weekly charts ===
Weekly chart performance for Greatest Hits
Chart (2007)	Peak position
Australian Albums (ARIA)	36
Belgian Albums (Ultratop Flanders)	105
Canadian Albums (Billboard)	21
Hungarian Physical Albums (MAHASZ)	27
UK Albums (Official Charts)	57
UK R&B Albums (Official Charts)	4
US Billboard 200	1
US Top R&B/Hip-Hop Albums (Billboard)	1
US Top Rap Albums (Billboard)	1

=== Year-end charts ===
Year-end chart performance for Greatest Hits
Chart (2007)	Position
US Top R&B/Hip-Hop Albums (Billboard)	60
Chart (2017)	Position
US Billboard 200	169
Chart (2018)	Position
US Billboard 200	133
Chart (2019)	Position
US Billboard 200	144
Chart (2020)	Position
US Billboard 200	118
Chart (2021)	Position
US Billboard 200	105
US Top R&B/Hip-Hop Albums (Billboard)	75
Chart (2023)	Position
US Billboard 200	197
US Top R&B/Hip-Hop Albums (Billboard)	68
Chart (2024)	Position
US Billboard 200	149

== Certifications ==
Certifications for Greatest Hits
Region	Certification	Certified units/sales
Australia (ARIA)	Platinum	70,000^{^}
Italy (FIMI)	Gold	25,000^{‡}
United Kingdom (BPI)	2× Platinum	600,000^{‡}
United States (RIAA)	Platinum	1,000,000^{‡}
^{^} Shipments figures based on certification alone.^{‡} Sales+streaming figures based on certification alone.
