= Who Shot Ya? =

Song by the Notorious B.I.G.
- A-side: "Big Poppa"
- Released: February 21, 1995
- Recorded: 1994
- Studio: The Hit Factory (New York City)
- Genre: East Coast hip-hop; hardcore hip-hop; gangsta rap; boom bap; jazz rap
- Length: 5:20
- Label: Bad Boy; Arista
- Songwriter: Christopher Wallace
- Producers: Nashiem Myrick; Jean-Claude Olivier; Sean Combs

"Who Shot Ya?" is a song by American rapper the Notorious B.I.G., backed by Sean Combs. Bad Boy Entertainment released it on February 21, 1995, on an alternate reissue of Wallace's single "Big Poppa/Warning". Its new B-side "Who Shot Ya", a revision of a track already issued earlier in 1995, was "controversial and hugely influential." Widely interpreted as a taunt at Tupac Shakur, the single provoked a "rap battle" between the two rappers, formerly friends.

Wallace, when interviewed, explained his "Who Shot Ya" lyrics as simply portraying a rivalry between drug dealers. The instrumental is a sample that loops a portion of soul singer David Porter's 1971 song "I'm Afraid the Masquerade Is Over", from the album Victim of the Joke? An Opera. The song supposedly references Shakur's 1994 non-fatal shooting, which Shakur had suspected Wallace of being involved with. Wallace disputed Shakur's portrayal, and called the rumors blaming him "crazy" in the track's lyrics. Out of prison, Tupac answered in June 1996 by the B side "Hit 'Em Up"—accusing Wallace by name—a "diss track" which inflamed the East Coast–West Coast hip hop rivalry to its peak.

Tupac's fatal shooting in September 1996 and Wallace's in March 1997 drew speculations partly blaming the "rap battle". The track was reissued in 1999 on the posthumous Biggie album Born Again, in 2001 on a "Big Poppa/Warning" reissue with remixes, in 2004 on a remaster of his 1994 debut album Ready to Die, and in 2007 on his compilation album Greatest Hits. The rock band Living Colour's music video for their 2016 cover version protests gun violence.

== Closing another B side ==
=== Track selection ===
In July 1993, Uptown Records' founder Andre Harrell fired his unbridled A&R man and record producer Sean "Puffy" Combs, age 23, whose new label, Bad Boy Entertainment, then found parenting by Clive Davis's Arista Records. By late 1994, Bad Boy prevailed via rapper Craig Mack's hit single "Flava in Ya Ear," yet especially by Bad Boy's first album, Ready to Die, released on September 13, 1994, the debut album of gangsta rapper Notorious B.I.G. The album is mostly grim and hardcore, but Puffy removed "Who Shot Ya" from it.

Biggie wanted the first single to be "Machine Gun Funk." Puffy made the first two A sides instead friendly songs—"Juicy" and then "Big Poppa," songs that Biggie resisted recording—to increase radio appeal and sales, yet placed harder songs as their B sides. The "Big Poppa" B side, "Warning," an album track, thus in practice a "double A side," relies on the instrumental of Isaac Hayes's cover version of "Walk on By," and casts Biggie suspecting that members of his own circle will set up him up for a robbery. Each of the two songs received its own music video.

=== Mixtape version ===
An underground "Who Shot Ya" differing—but same instrumental—was released in 1995 before the single. Amid lore of this mixtape version, some speculated that it was a myth. (In 2017, DJ EFN casually ventured that he may have had an underground issue on vinyl in a white sleeve, as used by DJs, before December 1994.) In 2014, when the mixtape "Who Shot Ya" was traced to DJ S&S, a renowned issuer of New York mixtapes in the 1990s, its original audio was publicized. Like a mixtape track, it is only two minutes long—one Biggie verse, 24 bars, then one Keith Murray verse, 23 bars, amid "hype man" Puffy tersely yelling announcements—but the verses are longer than the standard 16 bars.

In 2004, Brooklyn rapper Shawn "Jay-Z" Carter recollected, about the mixtape, "I've heard songs I like, but the last time I remember being truly, truly inspired was when I heard 'Who Shot Ya.' " One night, Kareem "Biggs" Burke, cofounder of Jay-Z's label, Roc-A-Fella Records, drew him to Harlem's 125 Street, entered his car, inserted the tape, and fled. Jay-Z reflects, "He knew that if I heard 'Who Shot Ya?,' it's going to inspire me to make songs even hotter. But that song, it was so crazy. It just had an effect on everybody. The world stopped when he dropped 'Who Shot Ya?' " On Jay-Z's track "Brooklyn's Finest" off Reasonable Doubt, guest Biggie includes the phrase who shot ya and the word warning.

=== Single version ===
Closing the week of February 25, 1995, the "Big Poppa/Warning" single—released December 5, 1994—had spent six weeks, including five weeks at No. 1, on Billboard's Hot Rap Singles chart. The single entered the main popular songs chart, the Billboard Hot 100, the week ending January 14 and, enduring 24 weeks, peaked at No. 6 on March 18. Yet on February 21, Bad Boy issued a new "Big Poppa/Warning" with an added B side, "Who Shot Ya," which grew Biggie's menacing persona. The track also includes "hype man" Puffy, previously friendly, yelling in uncharacterisic aggression. The instrumental is basically a repeating portion of soul singer David Porter's 1971 song "I'm Afraid the Masquerade is Over," variously sampled in numerous rap songs. "Who Shot Ya" is among the most influential and historic. In 2020, Vulture.com, owned by New York magazine, ranked it #52 among "100 songs that define New York rap."

Published lyrics may omit Puffy's vocals, repeatedly yelling, in part, "As we proceed— / to give you what you need— / 9-5, motherfuckers— / Get live, motherfuckers— / As we proceed— / to give you what you need— / East Coast, motherfuckers— / Bad Boy, motherfuckers—." Otherwise, one writer estimates, "The story Biggie tells in 'Who Shot Ya?' is simple and brutal. Someone's out to get him, but Biggie gets the drop on his foe." MTV recognizes Biggie's verses for, nonetheless, "using the art of music to make the art of war sound beautiful." "Biggie, menacing as ever," describes a writer in Billboard, "makes use of negative space in his verses that give his threats a biblical intensity." Meanwhile, the instrumental, "deceptively candied," "lends the missive a psychedelic quality." Yet this instrumental was heard briefly by R&B fans since the November 29, 1994, release of Mary J Blige's second album, My Life, first in track one, titled "Intro," and then in track six, "K. Murray Interlude."

== Production backstory ==
In 2014, a publicity piece for New York rap DJ and Hot 97 radio host Funkmaster Flex's new book announced, "The song 'Who Shot Ya' was originally an intro for Mary J Blige's album. Uptown/MCA said it was too hard. The song in its original form had a verse from Big, Keith Murray, and LL Cool J, though LL never did his verse. The song still exists!' "

=== My Life recording ===
"Who Shot Ya" traces to the Uptown Records recording of R&B singer Mary J Blige's second or November 1994 album, My Life. Its record producers were Carl "Chucky" Thompson, Prince Charles Alexander, and Sean "Puffy" Combs, while Nashiem Myrick, studio manager, "played a big role." Prince Alexander was a Bad Boy regular, whereas Chucky Thompson and Nashiem Myrick were among "the Hitmen," the inner circle of staff record producers at Bad Boy Entertainment. Puffy began Bad Boy in 1992 while A&R director at, and initially in partnership with, Andre Harrell's Uptown Records.

Myrick had joined Bad Boy at its outset in 1993 as "studio intern," but in 1994 was its "production coordinator." Myrick, as the main producer of "Who Shot Ya," recalls Puffy tasking him to make an instrumental for rapper Keith Murray as an interlude on Blige's album. Myrick thus "came up with 'Who Shot Ya' "—or at least its basic instrumental—Myrick recalled in 2013. Despite the "Who Shot Ya" impetus or evolution being retold with some discrepancies across the interviewed witnesses—Biggie himself, Nashiem Myrick, Chucky Thompson, and Biggie's protégé Lil' Cease—agreed is that Puffy declared the result "too hard" for the R&B album.

My Life opens with the track titled "Intro," 64 seconds long, which at 22 seconds begins and sustains the "Who Shot Ya" instrumental, without any of its vocals, at low volume under Puffy's speech, soon in dialog with Mary J Blige's. Track six is "K. Murray Interlude," 22 seconds long, which opens with the same instrumental and nearly six bars of Murray's verse, nearly a quarter of his full verse. Midway into Murray's final full line included—My subliminals mix with criminal chemicals—Puffy speaks atop it, "Yo, Big Chuck, put on some of that smooth shit, man." Midway into Murray's next line, all music aborts, whereupon a mechanical noise occurs twice, and the track ends.

=== Instrumental mix ===
Puffy, savvy on classic records, often told producers exactly what to sample, but sometimes left the task open. In this case, Nashiem Myrick recalls an open task and the initial instrumental confusing Puffy, because the mixing console showed only one audio source, no isolated drum track. The instrumental was simply one sample on loop, the drums native, explained Myrick. Puffy then tasked Jean-Claude "Poke" Olivier, of the Trackmasters production duo, who both worked for Bad Boy, to simply embellish the drums.

Poke's programming of a synthesized kick drum, heavier and "fluffy," on a drum machine completed the instrumental. Otherwise, it is a sample from "I'm Afraid the Masquerade is Over" by soul singer David Porter, the Isaac Hayes co-producer who shared backing vocalists with Hayes, reinterpreted and extended popular hits. Porter's cover version and extension of this 1939 classic is on his "rock/soul opera" concept album, released in January 1971, that became a cult classic, titled Victim of the Joke? An Opera.

=== Chucky Thompson ===
Chucky Thompson, interviewed in 2014, recalled a customary occasion of record shopping with Nasheim Myrick, and this time also entering the studio later while Myrick—inclined to scour records for samples—was playing one of these records in search of a portion to sample, then found one, and played it, looping, for hours. Puffy meanwhile, having eventually entered the studio with Biggie, "got the idea to use it as an interlude for Mary's My Life album," recalls Thompson.

Thompson adds, "Biggie originally rapped the verse on the interlude, and he was later replaced by Keith Murray." "The reason why Keith Murray was brought in was due to B.I.G.'s verse on the interlude. If we kept his original verse, Puff would have been forced to place an Explicit Lyrics sticker on the album, and he didn't want to do that to Mary, so they brought Keith Murray in to replace Biggie." "This sample," says Thomas, "ended up being used for the Notorious B.I.G.'s song 'Who Shot Ya.' "

=== Nashiem Myrick ===
Nashiem Myrick, interviewed in 2013, explained, "Actually, that joint was not meant for Big. We was working on the Mary, My Life, album. Puff came to me and said, 'Listen, I need an interlude beat for Keith Murray.' So one day, I got some time. I'm looking through the stuff in the studio, the CDs and records—boom, boom—I come across this record I always wanted to listen to. It's long, it's like 9 minutes long, 11 minutes long, however. Went through the whole record, came up with 'Who Shot Ya.' Keith Murray came through. LL actually came—do the rap on it—but he couldn't finish it. Puff said, 'Go get your man Big, and get him on that record: we have to have it done by Monday.' It was Friday. Found Big. Big came to the studio, blessed me. And that's history." (LL Cool J, around this time managed by Puffy, was a guest—along with Biggie, Busta Rhymes, and Rampage—on a remix of Bad Boy's first single, Craig Mack's "Flava in Ya Ear.")

=== Junior M.A.F.I.A. ===
Biggie, when variously interviewed and asked about "Who Shot Ya," explained the lyrics as portraying a young drug dealer's turf war against an older drug dealer, that "I wrote," and that it "was finished," too, "way before" late November 1994. "It was supposed to be the intro to that shit Keith Murray was doing on Mary J. Blige's joint," Biggie asserted. Mainstays at Biggie's recording sessions were members of his rap clique Junior M.A.F.I.A., especially Lil' Cease, who recounts his alliance with Biggie from their Brooklyn neighborhood, whom Biggie brought into the music industry, and who seemingly was one of only two persons within the music industry whom Biggie thoroughly trusted. In 2017, Cease indicated that "Who Shot Ya" recording, too, was "way before" late November 1994, but that "Keith Murray, LL Cool J, and Big" were the original artists on "Who Shot Ya," planned as "the intro to Mary J, My Life, album." Cease added that once this original was rejected as "too hard" for her album, Biggie took it and, adding a verse to replace Keith Murray's verse, made it his own.

== Industry rumor mill ==
The November 1994 attack on Tupac was a turning point in American popular music. Although Biggie never conceded the accusation, "Tupac Shakur and a legion of his fans interpreted the Biggie B-side 'Who Shot Ya?' as a troll job," a barely veiled taunt. In any case, a "rap battle" ensued. Tupac's June 1996 answer song, "Hit 'Em Up," taking lyrical menace to unprecedented extreme, was personal and overt, "arguably the most passionate and unhinged diss record in history." Tupac had been otherwise incarcerated across 1995 into October, but associating menace and homicide began before Tupac's release from prison. The new trend in rap culture promptly figured into pop culture.

=== Lost friendship ===
In May 1993, on Bad Boy's first visit to Los Angeles, Biggie, upon his first single, "Party and Bullshit," sought and met Tupac. In August and September, in New York to rap, Tupac visited Biggie in Brooklyn, and they rapped shows together in Manhattan. Biggie joined Tupac and Randy "Stretch" Walker—of the Live Squad rap/production team from Queens, New York—yielding a new trio of running, rapping, and recording mates. Yet in July, Puffy's firing from Uptown Records paused Biggie's album recording, an 18 months total while Biggie struggled financially. Puffy placed Biggie as guest on two more singles, Mary J. Blige's "What's the 411?" remix and Super Cat's "Dolly My Baby."

Tupac, star of the films Juice and Poetic Justice had his second album Strictly 4 My N.I.G.G.A.Z... (1993) yield his first Top 10 hits on the US Billboard Hot 100 chart, "I Get Around" and "Keep Ya Head Up". In November, while in New York shooting the film Above the Rim, he frequently socialized with underworld boss Jacques "Haitian Jack" Agnant. Brooklyn boxer Mike Tyson advised Tupac, "I think you're out of your league." Tupac's first Rolex purchase was to enter Agnant's circle. Biggie recalled being present at the purchase, but Tupac reportedly favored company wealthier than Biggie, who warned him to avoid Agnant. Tupac, regarding Agnant as a friend, reportedly told him of the advice, causing Biggie to receive backlash from Agnant's circle.

In June 1996, Biggie reflected, "There's shit that motherfuckers don't know. I saw the situation and how shit was going, and I tried to school the nigga." "He knows when all that shit was going down, I was schooling a nigga to certain things, me and Stretch—God bless the grave." Stretch died in an unsolved shooting on November 30, 1995. "But he," Biggie said of Tupac, "chose to do the things he wanted to do. There wasn't nothing I could do. But it wasn't like he wasn't my man." By the time of the nonfatal shooting of Tupac on November 30, 1994, he and Biggie, as varying retrospective sources allege, were either simply still "friends," had sustained "smaller kerfuffles," or, per street rumors, "had a war brewing."

=== 1994 shooting ===
Tupac recalled Jacques "Haitian Jack" Agnant introducing him to James "Jimmy Henchman" Rosemond, who recalled instead introducing Tupac to Agnant. Both fearsome in New York City's criminal underworld, Agnant and Rosemond were managers and promoters reputed to extort and rob disfavored music artists. On November 29, 1994, Rosemond hired Tupac to record at Quad Recording Studios with his client Little Shawn, rapper, Uptown Records, and record producer Bryce Wilson. Tupac, amid "major beef" with Agnant, and confronted by Rosemond for it on November 25, was leery. Present was Uptown's boss Andre Harrell, summoned by Rosemond. Rosemond recalled "plenty of people." Tupac recalled "about 40." Little Shawn, as if "everybody must have known this cat was coming," recalled it "like a fucking party." Puffy, hanging out, recalled nearby filming for the "Warning" music video, then going to visit Biggie on a higher of Quad's five floors, but getting sidetracked on this floor, Quad's required reception stop.

Biggie, although sometimes reportedly with Puffy, Harrell, and Rosemond when Tupac arrived upstairs, was instead on a higher floor recording with his own rap group, Junior M.A.F.I.A. Near 12:30 AM, Tupac, Stretch, and two other men entered the building lobby, where Tupac was shot resisting successful robbery of $40 000 of jewelry. Stretch's manager, Freddie "Nickels" Moore, was nonfatally shot in the abdomen, "but that," Tupac later said, "was the bullet that went through my leg." Once upstairs, Tupac instantly blamed Rosemond, and later grew convinced of his guilt. Tupac would ultimately question lobby events as to Stretch, others' reactions upstairs, and "Who Shot Ya" release. In response, Tupac would eventually record "Hit 'Em Up," assailing Biggie and Puffy, whereas "Against All Odds," released posthumously, assails Agnant and Rosemond for setting him up. By then or eventually, each complained about Tupac's airing names and gripes in the media and allegedly fostering cinematic drama in his own life.

=== Key accusations ===
For a November 1993 incident in his Midtown Manhattan hotel suite, Tupac Shakur's November 1994 trial led to December 1 conviction of sexual abuse, first degree, for groping. On February 7, 1995, denied probation, he received prison—four years and six months—parole eligibility in 18 months. A January 1995 jailhouse interview of Tupac—disavowing his own "Thug Life" ethos, vowing only directly positive acts, and leery at conduct by Stretch during and by others upstairs after the November 1994 shooting—appeared in Vibe's April issue. It, allegedly, "accused" Biggie and "blamed" Puffy, or "implicates" them and Andre Harrell. Puffy called it, instead, "open-ended, like me and Big and Andre had something to do with" the attack, a main topic via "Who Shot Ya" when New York radio station Hot 97 interviewed Biggie. Replying in Vibe's August issue, rather, each party but Stretch and Biggie recalled the injured Tupac acting like a movie role.

James "Jimmy Henchman" Rosemond further called Tupac a "coward" who tried "street" ways but failed "the test" and was, "hysterically, talking about, 'Call the police.' " Puffy spoke of empathy and hope his "Thug Life" ethos "is really over," but added, "if you gonna be a motherfuckin' thug, you gots to live and die a thug." Tupac was, Biggie estimated, "the realest nigga in the game," but, recently assailed severely, "was just confused," maybe seeking cover or shelter by the interview, "just shitting on everybody." "And then," Biggie added, "the story just completely got switched around: niggas saying I set him up and I'm the one that got him shot. They're saying that my record 'Who Shot Ya?' is about him." "Niggas was taking little pieces of the song and trying to add it to the story, and that shit is crazy." Stretch called Tupac "my man," but demanded he "recognize what the fuck he's doing"—"telling niggas' names and all that shit" in "the media"—breaking a "street" "rule that's never to be broken."

On November 6, 1994, at a nightclub with a recent movie costar, Tupac met gossip columnist A J Benza, whereby New York's Daily News reported Tupac's viewing his own former codefendant Jacques "Haitian Jack" Agnant as a "hanger-on," maybe a government informant, who caused the rape and gun case. Street gossip then foresaw attack on Tupac. Rosemond, angered, would call the November 30 attack "discipline," but reassert innocence. Agnant eventually recounted issuing order to not attack Tupac, but a then close ally, angered by the newspaper story, "especially in New York City," setting up this attack, anyway. Widely viewed as its mastermind, Rosemond alleged that Tupac, being theatrical, "makes a situation to sell records," and recalled ordering Tupac to stop blaming Biggie and Puffy, who "ain't got nothing to do with this." Puffy, citing Tupac's deeming the gunmen's identifies open knowledge on the street, called himself and Biggie "scapegoats."

Reportedly, New York police had within the Bad Boy or Uptown label a confidential informant who named Biggie as the attack's contractor, but government misinformation is possible. Tupac heard street word that Biggie simply withheld warning of it. Rosemond, disputing the storied five gunshot wounds, asserted Stretch's recount of only one gunshot, when a robber's grabbing Tupac's hand, trying to draw the gun, discharged it. Lil' Cease recalls this a consensus—whereby Bryce Wilson cites gunpowder on Tupac's boxers—a variant question of who shot him. Biggie called him, in Vibe's August 1995 issue, "just confused more than anything. You get shot and then you go to jail for something you ain't even do. That could twist a nigga's mind up." But as Vibe's excerpt omitted, Biggie also expressed appall at, he said, "what really went down": pistol-whipping and self-inflicted gunshot but, then, "just getting a little bit too happy with the situation, trying to make movies. Everything was a movie to him."

== Enduring debate ==
Biggie consistently disputed that "Who Shot Ya" targeted Tupac. Still, some call it a diss track, if "subliminal." Biggie recorded his lyrics "months" before Tupac was shot in November 1994, but Puffy removed the song from Biggie's album, released in September 1994. On both the mixtape track and the B side, however, Puffy shouts, "9-5." Naima Cochrane, who "went on to work at Bad Boy" after working at a law firm that "represented the full roster of producers" at Bad Boy, judges, " 'Who Shot Ya' sounds exactly like a track that accidentally launched rap's biggest feud between Biggie and Tupac."

In 2009, the biographical film Notorious was released, and Rahman Dukes, who with coworkers had done research for it, announced, "Biggie himself clears up 'Who Shot Ya' misunderstanding." Dukes prefaces that Lil' Cease, who was Biggie's main rap buddy, as well as DJ Mister Cee, who had discovered Biggie, denied it as a Tupac taunt. Dukes adds, "Hell, even Diddy"—formerly Puffy—"shot down those claims." Dukes asserts, "Only the late, great B.I.G. could clear matters up, but we all know that's not possible." Dukes reports a "long-lost freestyle" with "a few bars," "a bit of hard-core evidence," but leaves it for listeners to judge.

On the other hand, in 2010, rap magazine XXL assessed "8 subliminal diss records" and appraised, " 'Who Shot Ya?' remains highly contested, but the lyrics to 'Long Kiss Good Night' were even more direct." "In the April 2003 issue of XXL, Lil' Cease confirms the record was aimed at 'Pac, while Puff contends that 'If Biggie was going to do a song about 2Pac, he would have just come out with it and said his name.' " Released posthumously, "Long Kiss Goodnight" itself features Puffy's ad lib disclaimer—And we ain't talking about no other rap niggas—but this song, nonetheless, "was definitely about 'Pac, no 2 ways about it," concludes XXL by citing other lyrics.

XXL meanwhile estimated about "Who Shot Ya?" that "the timing of its release and the perceived subliminal shots"—including allegedly "telling lyrics" in Biggie's second verse, new in the single—"lead us to believe that this was most likely a diss record." In 2014, however, Bad Boy staff producer Chucky Thompson, key in Ready to Die production, and witness to "Who Shot Ya" production, asserted, "I still have that recording with me today, and him saying that phrase had absolutely nothing to do with Tupac." Nashiem Myrick, the song's main producer, asserted, "We have no reason, no motive, at all, to have set 'Pac up. What's the motive? What's the issue? It's no issue. So, nah." In August 2022, former Bad Boy Records president Kirk Burrowes stated that while Biggie may not have intended "Who Shot Ya?" as a diss towards Tupac, in hopes of gaining more success, Combs marketed the song so that it would be interpreted as one.

== Certifications ==
Certifications for "Who Shot Ya?"
Region	Certification	Certified units/sales
New Zealand (RMNZ)	Platinum	30,000^{‡}
United Kingdom (BPI)	Silver	200,000^{‡}
^{‡} Sales+streaming figures based on certification alone.

== Releases ==
- Ready to Die (Remaster edition)
- Born Again
- Greatest Hits
- "Big Poppa" 12" single
