= Just a Memory =

Just A Memory may refer to:

== Music ==
- Just a Memory, record label The Valentino Orchestra Kester Smith etc.

=== Albums ===
- Not Just A Memory, compilation album (Amy Records) (1983) Adam Faith

=== Songs ===
- "Just a Memory", song by Paul Whiteman 1927 in music
- "Just a Memory", 1960 song recorded by Johnny Hodges
- "Just a Memory", song by Lew Brown, Buddy DeSylva, Ray Henderson from Alone (Judy Garland album) and Side by Side (Duke Ellington and Johnny Hodges album)
- "Just a Memory", song from the 1957 film The Helen Morgan Story
- "Just A Memory"/"Kneel and Pray" (1961) Mack Starr and the Paragons Winley Records
- "Just a memory", song from Nina Simone discography 1982
- "Just a Memory", song by Odesza from A Moment Apart
- "Just a Memory", song by Escape the Fate from Hate Me (album)
- "Just a Memory", song by Elvis Costello from Get Happy!! (Elvis Costello album), Taking Liberties 1980
- "Just a Memory", song by Desert Rose Band from Pages of Life and In Another Lifetime
- "Just a Memory", single by The Shakin' Pyramids from Celts and Cobras 1982
- "Just a Memory", song by The Notorious B.I.G. Scram Jones List of songs recorded by The Notorious B.I.G. 2005
- "Just a Memory", single by 7 Mile from 7 Mile (album)
- "Just a Memory", 1994 from List of songs written by Kostas
- "Just a Memory", song by John Mayall from A Special Life 2014
- "Just a Memory", written and performed by Zoe Nicholas United Kingdom in the Eurovision Song Contest 1988
- "Just a Memory", song by The Mavericks from What a Crying Shame 1994
- "Just A Memory", song by Jason Blaine from Make My Move 2004
- "Just a Memory", song by Train from Bulletproof Picasso
- "Just a Memory", song from Pacific Rim (soundtrack)
- "Just a Memory", song by Carrie Lucas from Portrait of Carrie 1980
- "Just A Memory", song by The Generators from Burning Ambition
- "Just a Memory", song by Tubeless Hearts from Three
- "Just a Memory", song by Jake Sinclair (musician)

== Other ==
- "Just a Memory", episode from The Roaring 20's (TV series)
