= Dead Wrong (song) =

Single by the Notorious B.I.G. featuring Eminem

from the album Born Again
- Released: October 26, 1999
- Recorded: 1993; 1999
- Genre: Horrorcore; gangsta rap
- Length: 4:58
- Label: Bad Boy; Arista
- Songwriters: Christopher Wallace; Marshall Mathers; Chucky Thompson; Mario Winans
- Producers: Chucky Thompson; Mario Winans; P. Diddy

The Notorious B.I.G. singles chronology
| "Victory" (1998) | "Dead Wrong" (1999) | "Notorious B.I.G." (1999) |

Eminem singles chronology
| "Guilty Conscience" (1999) | "Dead Wrong" (1999) | "Forgot About Dre" (2000) |

"Dead Wrong" is a song by American rapper The Notorious B.I.G. featuring fellow American rapper Eminem, taken from the former's third overall album, Born Again. The song features background vocals from Diddy and was released as a single posthumously in 1999. The song is built around a drum sample from Al Green's "I'm Glad You're Mine".

== Critical reception ==
It was received positively by music critics. Reviewing the Born Again album, Rolling Stone wrote a positive overview: "The only real find here is the awesome 'Dead Wrong', which shows B.I.G. in his prime." A.V. Club wrote that Eminem is a highlight. However, Eminem's approach on the song was received negatively by Steve Juon of RapReviews,of which he stated that the posthumous album should've not been "insulted" with a whole version replacing the original track.

In 2024, Rolling Stone ranked "Dead Wrong" at number seven on their list of "The 50 Greatest Eminem Songs".

== Commercial performance ==
Commercially, "Dead Wrong" made its debut on the US Hot R&B/Hip-Hop Songs chart on the week of October 30, 1999, and made its peak at number 39 on the week of November 20. The single remained on the chart for fourteen weeks. In addition, it debuted and peaked at number fifteen on the US Bubbling Under Hot 100 chart on the week of November 13, 1999, remaining for three weeks.

== Music video ==
The video was set out in a similar manner to Tupac Shakur's song "Changes", which was released in 1998, in the fact that it features clips of Biggie performing live, in interviews, clips of his music videos and showing pictures of him. Eminem appears in the video in a separate clip, rapping his lyrics in the style of a freestyle video submission.

== Sampling and other uses ==
"Dead Wrong" song was mashed up with Led Zeppelin's "Whole Lotta Love" from the 2006 mixtape Rock Phenomenon, produced by DJ Vlad and Roc Raida, and hosted by Linkin Park's Mike Shinoda. The line "relax and take notes" was sampled in the song "Relax and Take Notes" by 8Ball & MJG featuring Project Pat, from their 2007 album Ridin High. On July 11, 2014, right before bringing out Dr. Dre, Eminem performed "Dead Wrong" at Wembley Stadium in London.

== Track listing ==
| No. | Title | Writer(s) | Producer(s) | Length |
|---|---|---|---|---|
| 1. | "Dead Wrong" (feat. Eminem) | Christopher Wallace; Marshall Mathers; Chucky Thompson; Mario Winans | Chucky Thompson; Mario Winans; Sean Combs | 4:57 |
| 2. | "Dead Wrong" (instrumental) | Wallace; Mathers; Thompson; Winans | Chucky Thompson; Mario Winans; Sean Combs | 4:57 |
| 3. | "Dead Wrong" (call-out research hook) | Wallace; Mathers; Thompson; Winans | Chucky Thompson; Mario Winans; Sean Combs | 0:17 |
| 4. | "Dead Wrong" (main version) (without Eminem) | Wallace; Thompson; Winans | Chucky Thompson; Mario Winans; Sean Combs | 4:57 |
| 5. | "Dead Wrong" (remix) (featuring Eminem) | Wallace; Mathers; Thompson; Winans | Chucky Thompson; Mario Winans; Sean Combs | 4:57 |

== Charts ==
| Chart (1999) | Peak position |
|---|---|
| US Bubbling Under Hot 100 (Billboard) | 15 |
| US Hot R&B/Hip-Hop Songs (Billboard) | 39 |
