= Party and Bullshit =

Single by The Notorious B.I.G.

from the album Who's the Man?: Original Motion Picture Soundtrack
- Released: June 29, 1993
- Genre: East Coast hip-hop; gangsta rap
- Length: 3:43
- Label: Uptown; MCA
- Songwriter: Christopher Wallace
- Producer: Easy Mo Bee

The Notorious B.I.G. singles chronology
"Dolly My Baby" (1993)	"Party and Bullshit" (1993)	"Juicy" (1994)

"Party and Bullshit" is a song by the American rapper the Notorious B.I.G., credited as BIG. Released on June 29, 1993, as the fourth single from the soundtrack to the film Who's the Man? (1993), "Party and Bullshit" was the rapper's debut single.

== Background ==
Christopher Wallace, born and raised in Brooklyn, New York City, during the emergence of the hip-hop scene, developed a passion for music at a young age. There, he met the saxophonist Donald Harrison, who introduced him to jazz. Wallace recorded one of his first songs in Harrison’s home studio. However, growing up during the crack epidemic, Wallace decided to focus on selling drugs, while still rapping as a hobby. According to The New York Times, "as a boy he preferred hanging around gamblers and drug dealers to sitting in a classroom". He dropped out of school in the tenth grade. To increase his drug-sale profits, he moved to North Carolina, where, at the age of 17, he was arrested and spent nine months in jail.

Upon release from jail, Wallace, known at the time as Biggie Smalls, (Note: Prior to the release of his debut album Ready to Die (1994), he was forced to change his stage name to the Notorious B.I.G. This change was prompted by a lawsuit from Calvin Lockhart, who played the character Biggie Smalls in the movie Let's Do It Again (1975).) decided to focus more on music. Back in Brooklyn, his friend DJ 50 Grand introduced him to Big Daddy Kane's DJ, Mister Cee. Enthusiastic about Biggie's rapping, Mister Cee convinced him to record a demo and send it to The Source magazine's column "Unsigned Hype", which showcased up-and-coming rap talents. Biggie remained skeptical but agreed. Impressed with the demo, the column's editor Matteo "Matty C" Capoluongo recommended him to Sean "Puffy" Combs, a young intern who by now was the vice president of A&R at Uptown Records. Combs helped Biggie get signed to Uptown. "Party and Bullshit" was Biggie's commercial debut, released after he was featured on several songs from other artists of the label.

== Recording ==
In 1992, Uptown Records and MCA Records signed a $50 million deal, which led to Uptown producing the soundtrack for the movie Who's the Man? (1993). Puffy, who was responsible for the soundtrack, decided to include his new artist, Biggie.

"Party and Bullshit" was recorded at Soundtrack Studios in New York. According to the song's producer Easy Mo Bee, it was recorded in one take. Biggie brought his friends from the group Junior M.A.F.I.A. for the recording session, they ordered food and were resting in the studio. Anxious about wasting expensive studio time, Easy Mo Bee kept asking him when they would start recording. "And he kept telling me, 'Yo, I got you, man.' Ordering food, eating burgers. And then he just jumped up and went right into the booth and just spat three verses. I was like, 'Yo, who is this dude?' I thought he was playing the whole time", said the producer.

In an interview with Vibe magazine, Biggie revealed that the original version of the song differed from the released version. The rapper explained that Andre Harrell, CEO of Uptown Records, asked him to record a party song.

== Composition ==
"Party and Bullshit" is an East Coast hip hop song. The main melody of the song is a loop, made by blending two samples: the siren from the song "UFO" by the band ESG and the organ from Johnny "Hammond" Smith's cover of "I'll Be There" by the Jackson 5. Nate Patrin of Stereogum wrote that the samples "melt into each other to sound richer", resulting in a track that "sounds amped and mellow at the same time".

The song begins with Biggie describing his early teenage years: calling himself a "terror since the public school era", talking about skipping classes and smoking marijuana daily. He then describes a modern day party, where he and all his friends brought firearms. Throughout the song, he references numerous alcoholic beverages. Towards the end of the third verse music stops and a small skit is played, portraying a fight at the party. After the fight ends, Biggie continues rapping with the phrase "Can't we just all get along?", alluding to the quote from the victim of police brutality Rodney King.

The song's chorus is built around the "party and bullshit" chant, which is an interpolation of the phrase from the 1968 song "When the Revolution Comes" by the spoken word group the Last Poets. However, Biggie altered its meaning: the original song sarcastically criticized young black people who ignored the fight for equality in favor of leisure and meaningless activities, while his song emphasized these activities, turning into what Sia Michel of Spin magazine called a "good-time anthem". Discussing the use of the phrase, Abiodun Oyewole of the Last Poets said: "When we rapped, it was all about raising consciousness and using language to challenge people. When I wrote [about] 'party and bullshit' it was to make people get off their ass. But now 'party and bullshit' was used by Biggie, used by Busta Rhymes, but in a non-conscious way." In his book Unbelievable, Cheo Hodari Coker argued that "Party and Bullshit" had a deeper meaning. The journalist wrote that the lyrics provided a social commentary, highlighting the problems of young men who grew up during the crack epidemic and desired to get rich.

== Release ==
"Party and Bullshit" was released on June 29, 1993, through Uptown Records. It was the fourth single from the soundtrack to the film Who's the Man? (1993) and Biggie's debut single. Apart from the song itself, the single also included two remixes, by Puff Daddy and Lord Finesse, which used different, jazzy instrumentals. "Party and Bullshit" did not chart and has not received a RIAA certification; however, it has sold 500,000 copies. S. H. Fernando Jr. of Rolling Stone magazine described it as an "underground smash", while the journalist Ronin Ro wrote that the song was a hit on radio stations and in nightclubs. According to him, following the release, other famous rappers would approach Biggie in nightclubs to shake his hand and praise him.

== Critical reception ==
In a contemporary review, Reginald C. Dennis of The Source magazine called the song a "hardcore debut" that "livens things up" on the soundtrack. The journalist praised Biggie's performance, referring to him as "the star of the album". Cheo Hodari Coker, in his book Unbelievable, commended the song, calling it a "fine vehicle for his storytelling skills and playful yet commanding cadence", that creates a colorful depiction of the Brooklyn night life. IGN described it as "considerably rawer" than the rapper's later songs, "showcas[ing] his strong willed cadence and propensity for catchy rhyming verses". Discussing the song, Ekow Eshun of The Independent said he was "mesmerised" after the first listen. "His lyrics turn the vernacular into the spectacular, delivering narrative with breathless ease", stated the journalist.

== Legacy ==
=== Remixes ===
In the late 1990s, Puff Daddy had plans to record a remix of "Party and Bullshit" for Biggie's posthumous compilation album Born Again (1999). The remix was supposed to feature Will Smith and a chorus from Faith Evans. The song has not been released officially.

In the following years, several artists remixed "Party and Bullshit". In 2007, the electronic duo Ratatat remixed it for their album Ratatat Remixes Vol. 2. The G-Unit rapper Lloyd Banks released "Party N Bullshit" on his mixtape Halloween Havoc (2008). Andrew Hathaway released a mashup of "Party and Bullshit" and Miley Cyrus song "Party in the U.S.A.". In 2015, Richie Branson and Solar Slim remixed the song for their Star Wars-themed mashup Life After Death Star.

=== Samples and copyright lawsuit ===
Numerous artists sampled "Party and Bullshit", including Rah Digga, Busta Rhymes, Young M.A, Cypress Hill, MF Doom, Jean Grae, and Joell Ortiz. Rita Ora's 2012 song "How We Do (Party)" interpolates the lyrics of "Party and Bullshit".

In 2016, Abiodun Oyewole, a founding member of the Last Poets, sued the Notorious B.I.G. estate for US$24 million in damages. Oyewole claimed that the use of the phrase "party and bullshit", taken from the spoken word group's 1968 song "When the Revolution Comes", constituted copyright infringement. The list of defendants also included executive producer Puff Daddy, producer Easy Moe Bee, and Rita Ora, along with several producers and songwriters of her song "How We Do (Party)". Initially, the lawsuit listed Busta Rhymes and Eminem, whose track "Calm Down" also sampled "Party and Bullshit", but Oyewole later dropped these claims voluntarily. After several years of legal battles, in 2019, the New York federal judge Robert Katzmann ruled that the use of the phrase in "Party and Bullshit" is within fair use.

== Track listing ==
Commercial 12-inch vinyl single

Side A

1. "Party and Bullshit" (Album Version) – 3:42
2. "Party and Bullshit" (Puffy's Dirty) – 4:07

Side B

1. "Party and Bullshit" (Lord's Dirty) – 4:15

Promotional 12-inch vinyl single

Side A

1. "Party and Bullshit" (Radio) – 3:42
2. "Party and Bullshit" (Album) – 3:42
3. "Party and Bullshit" (Instrumental) – 3:42

Side B

1. "Party and Bullshit" (Club Dirty) – 3:42
2. "Party and Bullshit" (Dirty Instrumental) – 3:42

== Personnel ==
Credits are adapted from the single's liner notes.

- Buttnaked Tim Dawg – co-producer
- James Earl Jones, Jr. – co-producer
- Sean "Puffy" Combs – executive producer
- Andre Harrell – executive producer
- Mark Siegal – executive producer
- Toby Emmerich – music supervisor
- Kathy Nelson – music supervisor
- Easy Mo Bee – producer
- Jonnie “Most” Davis - recording/mix engineer

== Certifications ==
Certifications for "Party and Bullshit"
Region	Certification	Certified units/sales
New Zealand (RMNZ)	Platinum	30,000^{‡}
^{‡} Sales+streaming figures based on certification alone.
