= Chucky Thompson =

American record producer (1968–2021)

- Born: Carl Edward Thompson Jr. July 12, 1968; Washington, D.C., U.S.
- Died: August 9, 2021 (aged 53) Los Angeles, California, U.S.
- Genres: R&B
- Occupation: Record producer
- Years active: 1989–2021
- Labels: Chuck Life Productions; Bad Boy

Carl Edward Thompson Jr. (July 12, 1968 – August 9, 2021) was an American record producer, best known for his work with Sean Combs' Bad Boy Records.

== Biography ==
Thompson was born in Washington, D.C., in 1968. He was a member of Bad Boy Entertainment's "Hitmen" team of in-house producers during the 1990s, and worked with Bad Boy mogul Sean Combs on material for artists such as The Notorious B.I.G. and Faith Evans.

His productions included Mary J. Blige's My Life, The Notorious B.I.G.'s Ready to Die and Faith Evans's Faith. Thompson also produced for Nas ("One Mic").

He died from complications of COVID-19 at a hospital in Los Angeles, California, on August 9, 2021.

== Production credits ==
Year	Album	Song	Artist
1994	Non-album single	How Many Ways (Bad Boy Remix)	Toni Braxton
1994	L.I.F.E.	Walkin' da L.I.F.E.; Visions of Nefertiti	Nefertiti
1994	Non-album single	Every Day of the Week (Puffy & Chucky's Special Remix)	Jade
1994	Usher	Interlude 1; Think of You; Slow Love; Interlude 2	Usher
1994	Non-album single	Flava In Ya Ear (Remix)	Craig Mack
1994	Ready to Die	One More Chance; Big Poppa; Me & My Bitch	The Notorious B.I.G.
1994	CrazySexyCool	Case of the Fake People; Intermission-lude; Let's Do It Again; Sexy Interlude	TLC
1994	My Life	All Tracks (except 16 & 17)	Mary J. Blige:
1994	Non-album single	Be Happy (Bad Boy Butter Mix)	Mary J. Blige:
1995	Non-album single	I Apologize (Chuck Life Remix)	Anita Baker
1995	Non-album single	One Sweet Day (Chucky's Remix)	Mariah Carey & Boyz II Men
1995	Non-album single	On the Down Low (Remix)	Brian McKnight
1995	Straight from My Heart	You	Pebbles
1995	Faith	All Tracks (except 2, 3, 6, 10 & 14)	Faith Evans
1995	Non-album single	Watch What You Say (Remix)	Guru
1995	Non-album single	If You Want It (Bad Boy Remix)	Soul for Real
1995	Non-album single	Hooked on You (Chucklife Remix)	Silk
1996	No One Else	Someone Like You; Love Is All We Need; Don't Ever Change	Total
1996	Non-album single	All Over Your Face (Chucky T's Remix)	Puff Johnson
1996	Until the Day	It's All Love; Until the Day	Nonchalant
1996	New Beginning	Don't Waste Your Time	SWV
1996	Non-album single	Who Do U Love (Chucky Thompson's Hip Hop Mix)	Deborah Cox
1996	Now & Forever	On My Mind	Color Me Badd
1996	I Will Survive (Doin' It My Way)	Baby Drive Me Crazy	Chantay Savage
1996	Back to the World	I'll Be There; We Can Work It Out	Tevin Campbell
1996	Home Again	You Don't Have to Worry; Try Again	New Edition
1996	For Life	Never Felt This Way	Soul For Real
1997	Harlem World	I Need to Be	Mase
1998	Destiny	Destiny (Remix)	Myron
1998	Non-album single	Get at Me	Monie
1998	Hav Plenty (soundtrack)	Tears Away; I Wanna Be Where You At	Faith Evans; SWV
1998	Keep the Faith	MY First Love; Caramel Kisses	Faith Evans
1998	Kima, Keisha, and Pam	I Tried (Interlude)	Total
1999	Mary	Time	Mary J. Blige
	Born Again	Dead Wrong; Can I Get Witcha	The Notorious B.i.G.
2000	The Hurricane (soundtrack)	Love Sets You Free	Kelly Price, Aaron Hall
	Kiss tha Game Goodbye	Keep Ya Head Up	Jadakiss
2001	Stillmatic	One Mic	Nas
2002	8 Mile: Music from and Inspired by the Motion Picture	U Wanna Be Me	Nas
2002	God's Son	Dance	Nas
2003	Weekend Warrior	Party till the Break of Time	Biz Markie

- 1994: Usher: "Think of You" from Usher
- 1994: Born Jamericans: Kids From Foreign
- 1994: The Notorious B.I.G.: "Big Poppa" and "Me & My Bitch" from Ready To Die
- 1994: Mary J. Blige: My Life (Nominated for a 1996 Grammy Award for Best R&B Album)
- 1995: Total: "No One Else (R&B Mix)"
- 1995: Faith Evans: "You Used to Love Me" and "Soon As I Get Home" from Faith
- 1995: Mariah Carey & Boyz II Men: "One Sweet Day (Chucky's Remix)"
- 1995: Brian McKnight: "On The Down Low (Remix) featuring Paid & Live"
- 1996: Puff Johnson: "All Over Your Face (Chucky T's No Rap Remix)"
- 1996: Chantay Savage: "Baby Drive Me Crazy" from I Will Survive (Doin' It My Way)
- 1996: Soul For Real: "Never Felt This Way" from For Life
- 1997: Frankie: My Heart Belongs To You
- 1998: Faith Evans & 112: "Caramel Kisses" from Keep the Faith
- 1999: Mary J. Blige: "Time" from Mary
- 1999: The Notorious B.I.G.: "Can I Get Witcha" from Born Again
- 2000: Ice Cube featuring Krayzie Bone: "Until We Rich" from War & Peace Vol. 2 (The Peace Disc)
- 2000: Mýa: "Get Over (Outro)" from Fear Of Flying
- 2001: Faith Evans: "Love Song (Outro)" from Faithfully
- 2001: Mary J. Blige: "Your Child (Chucky Thompson Late Nite Mix)"
- 2001: Nas: One Mic from Stillmatic
- 2001: Shyne & Barrington Levy: Bonnie & Shyne from Shyne
- 2002: Nas: "U Wanna Be Me" from 8 Mile
- 2002: Nas: "Dance" & "Pussy Killz" from God's Son
- 2003: Lil' Mo: "Ten Commandments" from Meet the Girl Next Door
- 2004: Nas: "No One Else In The Room" featuring Maxwell from Street's Disciple
- 2004: Gemma Fox: "Messy"
- 2005: Mary J. Blige: "Show Love" from The Breakthrough
- 2005: Lil' Mo: "Dem Boyz" from Syndicated: The Lil' Mo Hour
- 2006: Shareefa: "No One Said" from Point Of No Return
- 2007: Chuck Brown: We're About the Business
- 2007: Emily King: East Side Story (Nominated for a 2007 Grammy Award for Best Contemporary R&B Album)
- 2007: Sev-One: "War" (Single)
- 2007: Raheem DeVaughn: "Woman" (Grammy nominated for 2007 Best R&B Male Performance)
- 2009: Ledisi: "Everything Changes", "Trippin'" from Turn Me Loose
- 2010: Chuck Brown:We Got This
- 2010: Leela James: "Party All Night", "Mr. Incredible Ms. Unforgettable", "Let It Roll" from My Soul
- 2010: Faith Evans: "Way You Move", "Worth It", "Your Lover", and "Troubled World", from Something About Faith
- 2014: Juvenile: "Tales from the Hood", from The Fundamentals
- 2014: Faith Evans: "I Deserve It", "Fragile", "Ride The Beat (Interlude)" and "Ever Go Away", from Incomparable
- 2015: Ne-Yo: "Worth It" from Non-Fiction
- 2015: Raheem DeVaughn: "Pretty Lady" and "Queen" from Love Sex Passion
- 2015: Busta Rhymes: "Your Loss" from The Return of the Dragon (The Abstract Went On Vacation)
- 2016: Fantasia Barrino: "So Blue" (Co-Writer with Rock City and Shareefa) from The Definition Of...
- 2017: Faith Evans & The Notorious B.I.G.: "Beautiful (Interlude)", "Fool for You" and "Crazy (Interlude)" from The King & I
- 2020: Mary J. Blige: "Can't Be Life" from the soundtrack to the motion picture Body Cam

=== With Puff Daddy ===
- 1994: Craig Mack: Flava In Ya Ear (Bad Boy Remix- Easy Mo Bee)
- 1994: The Notorious B.I.G.: Big Poppa from Ready To Die
- 1994: TLC: If I Was Your Girlfriend from CrazySexyCool
- 1995: Faith Evans: Ain't Nobody and All This Love from Faith
- 1995: Mary J. Blige: You Bring Me Joy from My Life
- 1995: Pebbles: You from Straight From My Heart
- 1995: Total: Someone Like You from Total
- 1996: Tevin Campbell: I'll Be There from Back To The World
- 1996: New Edition: Try Again from Home Again
- 1997: Frankie: Think Of You from My Heart Belongs To You
- 1998: Faith Evans: My First Love from Keep The Faith
- 1999: The Notorious B.I.G.: Dead Wrong
