= Notorious Thugs =

1997 song by The Notorious B.I.G. featuring Bone Thugs-n-Harmony

Song by The Notorious B.I.G. featuring Bone Thugs-n-Harmony

from the album Life After Death
- Released: March 25, 1997
- Genre: Gangsta rap; hardcore hip hop
- Length: 6:07
- Label: Bad Boy; Arista
- Songwriters: Christopher Wallace; Bryon McCane; Anthony Henderson; Steven Howse; Sean Combs; Steven Jordan
- Producers: Combs; Stevie J

"Notorious Thugs" is a song by American rapper The Notorious B.I.G. featuring American hip hop group Bone Thugs-n-Harmony from the former's second studio album Life After Death (1997). It was produced by Sean "Puffy" Combs and Stevie J. The song contains a sample of "More Than Love" by Ohio Players.

== Background ==
The Notorious B.I.G. wanted to collaborate with Bone Thugs-n-Harmony on the song and tried to contact them, but they initially ignored him and did not want his offer because of Biggie's feud with fellow rapper 2Pac. Biggie then asked rapper Fat Joe to help connect him with the group. Joe convinced Bone Thugs-n-Harmony by suggesting the advantages of such collaboration and was eventually able to fulfill Biggie's request, with the group's manager Steve Lobel setting up the collaboration. Biggie studied Bone Thugs' signature flow before recording his verse at home. According to Lobel, Bone Thugs-n-Harmony finished their contribution to the song in less than one and a half hour.

== Composition ==
The song features a keyboard sample in the production and rapid-fire rapping, with verses from The Notorious B.I.G., Bizzy Bone, Krayzie Bone and Layzie Bone. B.I.G. refers to 2Pac with the line "so-called beef with you-know-who", calling their feud "bullshit", while Bone Thugs-N-Harmony also disses Three 6 Mafia.

== Critical reception ==
Cheo Hodari Coker of Los Angeles Times praised Biggie's performance, writing he "uses Bone Thugs-N-Harmony rapid-fire rhyme patterns so effectively that he could have become the group's sixth member." Michael A. Gonzales The Source commented that Biggie "holds his own" with Bone Thugs-n-Harmony and "That ambitious track alone reveals Smalls' diversity as an MC and his desire to be viewed as the greatest in his field."

== Charts ==
Chart (1997)	Peak position
US R&B/Hip-Hop Airplay (Billboard)	36

== Certifications ==
Region	Certification	Certified units/sales
New Zealand (RMNZ)	3× Platinum	90,000^{‡}
United Kingdom (BPI)	Silver	200,000^{‡}
^{‡} Sales+streaming figures based on certification alone.
