= Big Poppa =

Single by The Notorious B.I.G.

from the album Ready to Die
- A-side: "Warning"
- B-side: "Who Shot Ya?"
- Released: December 24, 1994
- Recorded: June 1994
- Studio: The Hit Factory (New York City)
- Genre: Hip-hop; dirty rap; G-funk; East Coast hip-hop
- Length: 4:11
- Label: Bad Boy; Arista
- Songwriters: Christopher Wallace; Ronald Isley; Ernest Isley; Marvin Isley; O'Kelly Isley Jr.; Rudolph Isley; Chris Jasper
- Producers: Chucky Thompson; Sean "Puffy" Combs

The Notorious B.I.G. singles chronology
"Flava in Ya Ear (Remix)" (1994)	"Big Poppa" (1994)	"Can't You See" (1995)

Music video
- "Big Poppa" on YouTube

"Big Poppa" is a song by American rapper The Notorious B.I.G., released on December 24, 1994, as the second single from his debut studio album, Ready to Die (1994). Produced by Chucky Thompson and Nashiem Myrick, it samples the song "Between the Sheets" (1983) by The Isley Brothers. "Big Poppa" is a rap song with elements of R&B and West Coast hip hop. It is named after one of The Notorious B.I.G.'s nicknames.

== Background and composition ==
Sean Combs, the executive producer of Ready to Die, wanted to sample the song "Between the Sheets" (1983) by The Isley Brothers. After Chucky Thompson and Nashiem Myrick produced a beat sampling the song at The Hit Factory, it was given to hip hop group Lost Boyz. Combs wanted the beat back, which resulted in a trade involving another beat, which ended up being used on Lost Boyz's 1995 song "Jeeps, Lex Coups, Bimaz & Benz".

According to Myrick, the Notorious B.I.G. "didn’t even like 'Big Poppa'", and said that it was one of the last songs recorded for Ready to Die. He also said that the beat was inspired by West Coast hip-hop: specifically, rappers Ice Cube, Snoop Dogg and especially 2Pac.

"Big Poppa" is a rap song with elements of R&B and West Coast hip hop. Named after one of the Notorious B.I.G.'s nicknames, the song sees him rapping about luxury brands and his lavish lifestyle. It features a Minimoog whistle and many critics described the song as "smooth".

== Release and reception ==
In 2017, "Big Poppa" was ranked at number 52 on Rolling Stone's "100 Greatest Hip-Hop Songs of All Time" list, and at number 331 on the publication's "Top 500 Greatest Songs of All Time" list in 2024. Billboard considered it the third best song on Ready to Die.

"Big Poppa" was nominated for the Grammy Award for Best Rap Solo Performance in 1996.

In June 2026, CBS News included the song in its list of the 250 essential American songs of the past 250 years.

== Commercial performance ==
The single was certified platinum by the RIAA and sold over 1,000,000 copies domestically. It marked The Notorious B.I.G.'s first top 10 hit on the Billboard Hot 100, debuting and peaking number 6.

== Music video ==
Filmed in late 1994, the music video premiered on BET and MTV for the week ending on December 11, 1994. Mary J. Blige, Misa Hylton, Faith Evans, Craig Mack, Lil’ Kim, Busta Rhymes and Treach of Naughty by Nature make cameo appearances.

== Track listings ==
- 12 inch

A1. "Big Poppa" (Club Mix) (4:13)
A2. "Warning" (Club Mix) (3:41)
A3. "Big Poppa" (Instrumental) (4:13)
B1. "Big Poppa" (Radio Edit) (4:12)
B2. "Warning" (Radio Edit) (2:57)
B3. "Warning" (Instrumental) (3:41)
B4. "Who Shot Ya?"

- Maxi-single
1. "Big Poppa" (radio edit)
2. "Big Poppa" (remix radio edit)
3. "Who Shot Ya?" (radio edit)
4. "Big Poppa" (remix instrumental)
5. "Big Poppa" (club mix)
6. "Big Poppa" (remix club mix)
7. "Who Shot Ya?" (club mix)
8. "Warning" (club mix)

== Charts ==
=== Weekly charts ===
Chart (1995)	Peak position
UK Singles (Official Charts)	63
US Billboard Hot 100	6
US Hot R&B/Hip-Hop Songs (Billboard)	4
US Hot Rap Songs (Billboard)	1
US Rhythmic Airplay (Billboard)	12
US Cash Box Top 100	7

Chart (2022)	Peak position
Canada Digital Song Sales (Billboard)	38

=== Year-end charts ===
Chart (1995)	Position
US Billboard Hot 100	47
US Hot R&B/Hip-Hop Songs (Billboard)	21
US Cash Box Top 100	29

== Certifications ==
Region	Certification	Certified units/sales
Canada (Music Canada)	7× Platinum	560,000^{‡}
Denmark (IFPI Danmark)	Gold	45,000^{‡}
Italy (FIMI) sales since 2009	Gold	50,000^{‡}
New Zealand (RMNZ)	6× Platinum	180,000^{‡}
Spain (Promusicae)	Gold	30,000^{‡}
United Kingdom (BPI)	2× Platinum	1,200,000^{‡}
United States (RIAA) Physical	Platinum	1,000,000^{^}
United States (RIAA) Digital	6× Platinum	6,000,000^{‡}
United States (RIAA) Mastertone	Gold	500,000^{*}
^{*} Sales figures based on certification alone.^{^} Shipments figures based on certification alone.^{‡} Sales+streaming figures based on certification alone.
