= Notorious B.I.G. (song) =

1999 single by The Notorious B.I.G. featuring Puff Daddy and Lil' Kim

Single by The Notorious B.I.G. featuring Puff Daddy, and Lil' Kim

from the album Born Again
- Released: December 11, 1999
- Genre: East Coast hip-hop; pop rap
- Length: 3:11
- Label: Bad Boy; Arista
- Songwriters: Christopher Wallace; Daven Vanderpool; Kimberly Jones; Nick Rhodes; John Taylor; Simon Le Bon
- Producers: Daven Vanderpool; Sean "Puffy" Combs

the Notorious B.I.G. singles chronology
"Dead Wrong" (1999)	"Notorious B.I.G." (1999)	"Runnin' (Dying to Live)" (2003)

Puff Daddy singles chronology
"Satisfy You" (1999)	"Notorious B.I.G." (1999)	"Do You Like It...Do You Want It..." (2000)

Lil' Kim singles chronology
"Get Naked" (1999)	"Notorious B.I.G." (1999)	"No Matter What They Say" (2000)

Music video
- "Notorious B.I.G." on YouTube

"Notorious B.I.G." is a song and single by The Notorious B.I.G. from the album Born Again, which features Lil' Kim, and Puff Daddy. As a tribute song, Lil' Kim and Puff Daddy's verses were recorded following Wallace's 1997 death, while Biggie's verse, originally from an unreleased song revolves around his experience in the hospital while being comforted by attractive female nurses. It samples the song "Notorious" by Duran Duran.

In February 2013, the song resurfaced on the Bubbling Under R&B/Hip-Hop Singles chart at #5 for one week.

== Music video ==
The music video was directed by Puff Daddy and features a narrative where he invites a security guard (played by Tracy Morgan) to a house party. The video is notable for its extensive cameos from figures in hip hop and pop culture, including 98 Degrees, Krayzie Bone, Thug Queen, Cuban Link, Wish Bone, Missy "Misdemeanor" Elliott, Nas, Jennifer Lopez, Lil' Cease, and Fat Joe.

== Track listing ==
=== 12-inch single ===
A-side

1. "Notorious" (club mix) – 3:12
2. "Notorious" (instrumental) – 3:12

B-side

1. "Dead Wrong" (radio edit) – 3:12
2. "Nasty Boy" (remix) – 4:15

=== Remix ===
A-side

1. "Notorious" (remix) (dirty mix)
2. "Notorious" (remix) (clean mix)
3. "Notorious" (remix) (instrumental)

B-side

1. "Biggie" (dirty mix)
2. "Biggie" (clean mix)
3. "Biggie" (instrumental)

=== CD single ===
1. "The Notorious B.I.G." (radio mix)
2. "The Notorious B.I.G." (club mix)
3. "The Notorious B.I.G." (instrumental)
4. "Dead Wrong" (Main w-o Eminem)
5. "One More Chance"/"Stay with Me" (remix)

== Charts ==
Chart performance for "Notorious B.I.G."
Chart (1999–2000)	Peak position
Australia (ARIA)	51
Belgium (Ultratip Bubbling Under Flanders)	15
Europe (Eurochart Hot 100)	61
Germany (GfK)	56
France (SNEP)	95
Ireland (IRMA)	46
Netherlands (Dutch Top 40 Tipparade)	11
Netherlands (Single Top 100)	78
Scotland Singles (Official Charts)	34
Sweden (Sverigetopplistan)	44
Switzerland (Schweizer Hitparade)	68
UK Singles (Official Charts)	16
UK Hip Hop/R&B (Official Charts)	4
US Billboard Hot 100	82
US Hot R&B/Hip-Hop Songs (Billboard)	30
US Rhythmic Airplay (Billboard)	28

Chart (2009)	Peak position
Canada Digital Song Sales (Billboard)	49

=== Year-end charts ===
Chart (2000)	Position
UK Urban (Music Week)	27

== Certifications ==
Certifications for "Notorious B.I.G."
Region	Certification	Certified units/sales
New Zealand (RMNZ)	Gold	15,000^{‡}
^{‡} Sales+streaming figures based on certification alone.
