= Ready to Die =

Studio album by The Notorious B.I.G.
- Released: September 13, 1994
- Recorded: December 1993 – June 1994
- Studios: The Hit Factory and D&D Studios, New York City
- Genre: East Coast hip-hop
- Length: 69:05 (68:17 in the censored version)^{[c]}
- Labels: Bad Boy; Arista
- Producers: Sean "Puffy" Combs; Mister Cee; Bluez Brothers; DJ Premier; Easy Mo Bee; Rashad Smith; Lord Finesse; Poke; Darnell Scott; Chucky Thompson; Pete Rock (uncredited)^{[b]}

The Notorious B.I.G. chronology
Ready to Die (1994)	Life After Death (1997)

30th Anniversary re-release cover

Singles from Ready to Die
- 1. "Juicy" Released: August 9, 1994; 2. "Big Poppa / Warning" Released: December 24, 1994; 3. "One More Chance" Released: June 6, 1995

Ready to Die is the debut studio album by the American rapper The Notorious B.I.G., released on September 13, 1994, by Bad Boy Records and distributed by Arista Records. The album features productions by Bad Boy founder Sean Combs, Easy Mo Bee, Chucky Thompson, DJ Premier and Lord Finesse, among others. It was recorded from 1993 to 1994 at The Hit Factory and D&D Studios in New York City. The partly autobiographical album tells the story of the rapper's experiences as a young criminal, and was the only album he released during his lifetime, as he was murdered sixteen days before the release of his second album Life After Death in 1997. The album features a guest appearance from Wu-Tang Clan member Method Man.

Ready to Die peaked at number 15 on the Billboard 200 and was subject to critical acclaim and soon a commercial success. Three singles were released: "Juicy", "Big Poppa", "One More Chance" and a promotional track of Biggie: "Warning". "Juicy", the lead single, peaked at number 27 on the Billboard Hot 100, number 14 on Hot R&B/Hip-Hop Singles & Tracks and reached number 3 on the Hot Rap Singles. "Big Poppa" was a hit on multiple charts, peaking at number six on the Billboard Hot 100 and also being nominated for a Grammy Award for Best Rap Solo Performance at the 1996 Grammy Awards. The Notorious B.I.G.'s lyrics were generally praised by critics, particularly for his story-telling ability.

In April 2018, Ready to Die was certified six-times platinum in the US. It was significant for revitalizing the East Coast hip-hop scene, amid West Coast hip-hop's commercial dominance. It has been ranked by many critics as one of the greatest hip-hop albums, as well as one of the greatest albums of all time. In 2020, it was ranked 22nd on Rolling Stone's updated list of the 500 Greatest Albums of All Time and was ranked 1st on their list of the greatest hip-hop albums. In 2024, it was added to the National Recording Registry by the Library of Congress as "culturally, historically, and/or aesthetically significant".

== Background and recording ==
The album was recorded in New York City (mainly at the Hit Factory) in two stages during 1993 and 1994. In 1992, Biggie was signed to the Uptown Records label by A&R Sean "Puffy" Combs. Biggie started recording his debut album in 1993 in New York, after making numerous guest appearances among his label-mates' singles around that time. The first tracks recorded include the darker, less radio-friendly content (including "Ready to Die", "Gimme the Loot" and "Things Done Changed"). In these sessions, XXL describe an "inexperienced, higher-pitched" Biggie sounding "hungry and paranoid".

When executive producer Sean "Puffy" Combs was fired from Uptown, Biggie's career hung in limbo, as the album was only partially completed. After a brief period dealing drugs in North Carolina, Biggie returned to the studio the following year on Combs' new Bad Boy Records label possessing "a smoother, more confident vocal tone" and completed the album. In this stage, the more commercial-sounding tracks were recorded, including the singles. Between the two stages, XXL writes that Biggie moved from writing his lyrics in notebooks to freestyling them from memory.

The album was released with a cover depicting an infant resembling the artist, though sporting an afro, which pertains to the concept of the artist's life from birth to his death. It has been listed as among the best album covers in hip-hop. The New York Daily News suggested in 2011 that the baby on the cover was Keithroy Yearwood, then a high school student in the Bronx. Bad Boy Records could not confirm him as the subject.

Regarding the title, Wallace said: "When I say I'm Ready to Die, people may be, like, 'Oh, he's on some killing himself shit.' That's not what I meant. I meant that I was willing to go all out a hundred percent as far as the music was concerned. When I was hustlin', I was doing that shit every day—waking up, putting drugs in my pocket, and not even thinking about the police, stickup men, or my competition. I was riskin' my life, so that meant I was ready to die."

=== Lawsuits and sample removal ===
On March 24, 2006, Bridgeport Music and Westbound Records won a federal lawsuit against Bad Boy Records for copyright infringement, with a jury deciding that Combs and Bad Boy had illegally used samples for the production of the songs "Ready to Die", "Machine Gun Funk", and "Gimme the Loot". The jury awarded $4.2 million in punitive and direct damages to the two plaintiffs, and federal judge Todd Campbell enacted an immediate sales ban on the album and tracks in question. On appeal, the Sixth Circuit found the damages unconstitutionally high and in violation of due process and remanded the case, at which point Campbell reduced them by $2.8 million; however, the verdict was upheld. All versions of the album released since the lawsuit are without the disputed samples.

Although a fair use issue, Combs and Bad Boy never raised the legal concept of the fair use doctrine in their defense. This decision was questioned by some legal experts: Anthony Falzone of the Fair Use Project at Stanford Law School criticized Combs and Bad Boy for not defending the legality of sampling and suggested that they might have refused to raise such a defense because they feared it could later imperil their control over their own music.

On April 2, 2014, Lee Hutson of the Impressions filed a multimillion-dollar copyright infringement suit against Combs, Bad Boy Records, and the estate of the Notorious B.I.G. for copyright infringement, alleging that his song "Can't Say Enough About Mom" was illegally sampled in the production of the song "The What". The case was dismissed. The estate countersued in turn, claiming the sample as used was short, adapted, and supplemented, and thus subject to fair use; the legal tactic not pursued previously.

== Composition ==
=== Production ===
Ready to Die was mainly produced by Easy Mo Bee and the Hitmen. Cheo H. Coker of Rolling Stone depicted the beats as "heavy bottomed and slick, but B.I.G.'s rhymes are the showstoppers. The tracks only enhance them, whether it's the live bass driving a menacing undercurrent or [the] use of bluesy guitar and wah-wah feedback" and that the production is used to "push the rapper to new heights." The production is mainly sample-based with the samples varying from the percussion of funk tracks to the vocals of hip-hop songs. Steve Huey presented some criticism over the beats, stating that the "deliberate beats do get a little samey, but it hardly matters: this is Biggie's show".

=== Lyrical themes ===
The lyrics were generally praised by critics. Many critics applauded his story-telling ability such as AllMusic writer Steve Huey, who stated "His raps are easy to understand, but his skills are hardly lacking—he has a loose, easy flow and a talent for piling multiple rhymes on top of one another in quick succession". He also went on to mention that his lyrics are "firmly rooted in reality, but play like [a] scene from a movie". Touré, writing for The New York Times, referred to the Notorious B.I.G., proclaiming that he stood out from other rappers because "his lyrics mix autobiographical details about crime and violence with emotional honesty, telling how he felt while making a living as a drug dealer". The album is also noted for its dark tone and sinister sense of depression. In the original Rolling Stone review, Cheo H Coker declared that he "maintains a consistent level of tension by juxtaposing emotional highs and lows". "Things Done Changed" was also one of the few hip-hop songs in The Norton Anthology of African American Literature.

The lyrics on Ready to Die tend to deal with violence, drug dealing, women, alcohol and marijuana use, and other elements of Notorious B.I.G.'s environment. He rapped about these topics in "clear, sparse terms, allowing the lyrics to hit the first time you hear them". The album contains a loose concept starting out with an intro that details his birth, his early childhood, his adolescence and his life at the point of the release. Songs range from homicide narratives ("Warning") to braggadocious battle raps ("The What," "Unbelievable"). "Things Done Changed" deals with how life in the ghetto has changed since B.I.G.'s childhood. "One More Chance" as recited by B.I.G largely centers around the rapper's sexual prowess. "Juicy" is a "rags-to-riches chronicle". The title for "Big Poppa" is based on one of the Notorious B.I.G.'s many nicknames. The final song was "Suicidal Thoughts", a song in which the Notorious B.I.G. contemplates and finally commits suicide.

== Singles ==
"Juicy"
The album's lead single is a rags to riches narrative, with music that samples Mtume's 1983 song "Juicy Fruit".

Three singles were released "Juicy", "Big Poppa", "One More Chance" and a promotional track of Biggie: "Warning". According to XXL the more commercial sound of the singles was a result of encouragement by Combs during the later recording sessions in which they were recorded.

"Juicy" was released as the lead single on August 8, 1994. It peaked at number 27 on the Billboard Hot 100, number 14 on Hot R&B/Hip-Hop Singles & Tracks and reached number 3 on the Hot Rap Singles. It shipped 500,000 copies in the United States and the RIAA certified it Gold on November 16, 1994. Produced by Combs, it features a prominent sample of "Juicy Fruit" as performed by James Mtume. AllMusic's Steve Huey stated that, along with the other singles, it was an "upbeat, commercial moment", calling it a "rags-to-riches chronicle". Andrew Kameka, of HipHopDX, stated that the song was one of his "greatest and most-revealing songs" and went on to say it was a "Part-autobiography, part-declaration-of-success. It document[s] the star's transition from Brooklyn knucklehead to magazine cover story." Producer Pete Rock, who was commissioned to remix the track, alleged that Puffy stole the idea for the original song's beat after hearing it from him during a visit. Rock explained this in an interview with Wax Poetics:

I did the original version, didn't get credit for it. They came to my house, heard the beat going on the drum machine, it's the same story. You come downstairs at my crib, you hear music. He heard that shit and the next thing you know it comes out. They had me do a remix, but I tell people, and I will fight it to the end, that I did the original version of that. I'm not mad at anybody, I just want the correct credit.

"Big Poppa" was released as the second single on December 24, 1994, and like the previous single, it was a hit on multiple charts. It reached number six on the Billboard Hot 100, number four on the Hot R&B/Hip-Hop Singles & Tracks and number one on Hot Rap Singles. It sold over a million units and the RIAA certified it Platinum on May 23, 1995. Featuring production by Combs and Chucky Thompson of the Hitmen, it samples "Between the Sheets" by the Isley Brothers. The song was nominated at the 1996 Grammy Awards for Best Rap Solo Performance, but lost to Coolio's "Gangsta's Paradise". Steve Huey named it an "overweight-lover anthem".

"One More Chance" was released as the third single on June 9, 1995. The single was a remix of the album track. It was produced by Combs and featured a sample from DeBarge's "Stay With Me". It peaked at number two on the Billboard Hot 100 and reached number one on the Hot R&B/Hip-Hop Singles & Tracks and Hot Rap Singles. It sold over a million copies and the RIAA certified it Platinum on July 31, 1995. Steve Huey labeled it a "graphic sex rap". Rolling Stone writer Cheo H. Coker had a similar view of the song, noting that it was "one of the bawdiest sex raps since Kool G Rap's classic, "Talk Like Sex" and continued, stating it "proves hilarious simply because of B.I.G.'s Dolemitelike vulgarity."

== Critical reception ==
1994 professional reviews
Review scores
Source	Rating
Q	3/5 stars
Rolling Stone	4/5 stars
The Source	4.5/5 stars

Ready to Die received widespread acclaim from music critics. In his review for Rolling Stone, Cheo H. Coker called it "the strongest solo rap debut since Ice Cube's AmeriKKKa's Most Wanted. From the breathtakingly visual moments of his birth to his Cobainesque end in 'Suicidal Thoughts,' B.I.G. proves a captivating listen. It's difficult to get him out of your head once you sample what he has to offer". Shortie of The Source praised Wallace's ability to "weave[s] tales like a cinematographer", calling each song "another scene in his lifestyle", and concluding that "Overall, this package is complete: ridiculous beats, harmonizing honeys, ill sound effects, criminal scenarios, and familiar hooks". In The New York Times, Touré wrote "Though drug dealing carries tremendous heroic value with some young urban dwellers, he sacrifices the figure's romantic potential. His raps acknowledge both the excitement of drug dealing and the stress caused by the threat from other dealers, robbers, the police and parents, sometimes one's own. In presenting the downside of that life, Ready to Die offers perhaps the most balanced and honest portrait of the dealer's life of any in hip-hop". Q stated "the natural rapping, clever use of sound effects and acted dialogue, and concept element (from a baby being born at the start to the fading heartbeat at the end) set this well apart from the average gangsta bragging".

== Commercial performance ==
Ready to Die shipped 57,000 units in its first week of release. However, it was then certified gold by the RIAA only two months after its release on November 15, 1994. On October 16, 1995, only a year and one month after its release the album was certified double platinum. Ready to Die was then certified triple platinum on August 26, 1998, and was later certified four-times platinum on October 19, 1999. In April 2018, Ready to Die was certified six-times platinum.

== Legacy ==
Retrospective professional reviews
Review scores
Source	Rating
AllMusic	5/5 stars
Blender	5/5 stars
Christgau's Consumer Guide	A−
The Great Rock Discography	8/10
HipHopDX	5/5 stars
MusicHound R&B	4/5 stars
Pitchfork	10/10
The Rolling Stone Album Guide	5/5 stars
Uncut	4/5 stars
XXL	5/5

Ready to Die has been highly acclaimed. In 1998, The Source included it on their 100 Best Rap Albums of All Time list, and in 2002, they re-rated it to the maximum five 'mics'. Rolling Stone has also given acclaim to Ready to Die over the years. In 2003, they ranked it number 133 on their 500 Greatest Albums of All Time list, 134 in a 2012 revised list, and 22 in a 2020 revised list. In 2004, they re-rated it to five stars. In 2011, Rolling Stone also placed it at number eight on their 100 Best Albums of the Nineties list, and described it as "mapping out the sound of 'Nineties cool'". In his Consumer Guide book, Robert Christgau commented "His sex raps are erotic, his jokes are funny, and his music makes the thug life sound scary rather than luxuriously laid back. When he considers suicide, I not only take him at his word, I actively hope he finds another way". Kilian Murphy from Stylus Magazine wrote favorably in a retrospective review, and concluded "Sweet, hypocritical, sensitive, violent, depressed and jubilant; these words could all fittingly describe Big at various points on Ready to Die."

Steve Huey from AllMusic gave it five stars, stating "The album that reinvented East Coast rap for the gangsta age, Ready to Die made the Notorious B.I.G. a star. Today it's recognized as one of the greatest hardcore rap albums ever recorded, and that's mostly due to Biggie's skill as a storyteller". In 2006, Time magazine included it on their 100 Greatest Albums of All Time list, and stated "On Ready to Die, Wallace took his street corner experiences and filtered them through his considerable charm. The result was a record that mixed long stretches of menace with romance and lots of humor. No rapper ever made multi-syllabic rhymes sound as smooth". The album was also included in the book 1001 Albums You Must Hear Before You Die.

In 2022, Pitchfork named Ready to Die the fourteenth-best album of the 1990s. Staff writer Alphonse Pierre called it "the cornerstone of a historic moment in hip-hop, the album that made the East Coast feel like the center of the rap universe again." He concluded: "There have been rappers who have tried to recapture Biggie’s presence, voice, and ability to be both grounded and larger than life at the same time, but Ready to Die itself is completely inimitable. Murals don’t do it justice."

=== Accolades ===
- (*) signifies unordered lists

Publication	Country	Accolade	Year	Rank
About.com	United States	100 Greatest Hip Hop Albums	2008	2
About.com	United States	Best Rap Albums of 1994	2008	2
About.com	United States	10 Essential Hip-Hop Albums	2008	3
Apple Music	United States	100 Best Albums	2024	32
Blender	United States	500 CDs You Must Own Before You Die	2003	*
Dance De Lux	Spain	The 25 Best Hip-Hop Records	2001	21
Robert Dimery	United States	1001 Albums You Must Hear Before You Die	2005	*
ego trip	United States	Hip Hop's Greatest Albums by Year 1980–98	1999	2
Entertainment Weekly	United States	The 100 Best Albums from 1983 to 2008	2008	40
The Guardian	United Kingdom	1000 Albums to Hear Before You Die	2007	*
Mojo	United Kingdom	Mojo 1000, the Ultimate CD Buyers Guide	2001	*
Mojo	United Kingdom	The Mojo Collection	2003	*
Tom Moon	United States	1,000 Recordings to Hear Before You Die	2008	*
MTV	United States	The Greatest Hip-Hop Albums of All Time	2005	4
MUZIQ	France	200 Records for a Dream Collection	2007	*
The New Nation	United Kingdom	Top 100 Albums by Black Artists	2005	8
Pause & Play	United States	Albums Inducted into a Time Capsule	—	*
Pitchfork	United States	Top 100 Favorite Records of the 1990s	2003	32
Q	United Kingdom	The Ultimate Music Collection	2005	*
Rolling Stone	United States	The Essential Recordings of the '90s	1999	*
Rolling Stone	United States	500 Greatest Albums of All Time	2020	22
Rolling Stone	United States	100 Best Albums of the Nineties	2011	8
Sounds by Rolling Stone	Germany	The 50 Best Albums of the 1990s	2009	37
The Source	United States	The 100 Best Rap Albums of All Time	1998	*
Spin	United States	The 90 Greatest Albums of the 90s	1999	27
Spin	United States	100 Greatest Albums (1985–2005)	2005	30
Spin	United States	125 Best Albums of the Past 25 Years	2012	43
Time	United States	The All-TIME 100 Albums	2006	*
Vibe	United States	100 Essential Albums of the 20th Century	1999	*
Vibe	United States	150 Albums That Define the Vibe Era (1992–2007)	2007	*
Village Voice	United States	Pazz & Jop	1995	38
VPRO	Netherlands	299 Nominations of the Best Album of All Time	2006	*

== Track listing ==
All tracks are written by Christopher Wallace, except "The What", written by Christopher Wallace and Clifford Smith.

No.	Title	Writer(s)	Producer(s)	Length
1.	"Intro"	Christopher Wallace; Sean Combs; Osten Harvey; Curtis Mayfield; Bernard Edwards; Nile Rodgers; Sylvia Robinson; Nat Robinson; Henry Jackson; Michael Wright; Curtis Brown; Kirk Robinson; Guy O’Brien; Raymond Jones; Glenn Bolton; Roy Hammond	Sean "Puffy" Combs	3:24
2.	"Things Done Changed"	Wallace; Dominic Owen; Kevin Scott; Darnell Scott	Darnell Scott	3:58
3.	"Gimme the Loot"	Wallace; Harvey; Bryan Higgins; Trevor Smith; Tyrone Taylor; Chylow Parker; James Jackson; Kamaal Fareed; Malik Taylor; Fred Scruggs; Keith Elam; Christopher Martin; Kirk Jones; Ali Muhammad	Easy Mo Bee	5:04
4.	"Machine Gun Funk"	Wallace; Harvey; Elam; Martin; Kevin Hansford; Charles Williams; Dupre Kelly; Marlon Williams; Al-Teril Wardrick	Easy Mo Bee	4:17
5.	"Warning"	Wallace; Harvey; Hal David; Burt Bacharach	Easy Mo Bee	3:40
6.	"Ready to Die"	Wallace; Harvey; Combs; Marshall Jones; Leroy Bonner; Clarence Satchell; Walter Morrison; Ralph Middlebrooks; Barbara Mason; Gregory Webster	Easy Mo Bee	4:24
7.	"One More Chance"	Wallace; Combs; Norman Glover; Carl Thompson; Reginald Ellis; Bunny Debarge; Mark Debarge	Bluez Brothers; Chucky Thompson; Combs	4:43
8.	"Fuck Me (Interlude) (censored #!*@ Me (Interlude) on the back cover)"	Wallace; Combs	Combs	1:31
9.	"The What" (featuring Method Man)	Wallace; Harvey; Clifford Smith	Easy Mo Bee	3:57
10.	"Juicy"	Wallace; Combs; Jean Olivier; James Mtume	Poke; Combs^{[a]}^{[b]}	5:02
11.	"Everyday Struggle"	Wallace; Glover; Ellis; Dave Grusin; Harvey Mason	Bluez Brothers	5:19
12.	"Me & My Bitch"	Wallace; Combs; Thompson; Glover; Ellis; Gary Morgan; Frank Donalds; Larry Troutman; Roger Troutman; Shirley Murdock	Bluez Brothers; Chucky Thompson; Combs	4:00
13.	"Big Poppa"	Wallace; Combs; Thompson; Ronald Isley; Chris Jasper; O’Kelly Isley; Marvin Isley; Rudolph Isley; Ernest Isley	Chucky Thompson; Combs^{[a]}	4:13
14.	"Respect"	Wallace; Combs; Olivier; Harry Casey; Richard Finch; Diana King	Poke; Combs	5:21 (4:33 in the censored version)^{[c]}
15.	"Friend of Mine"	Wallace; Harvey; Ronald Bell; Richard Westfield; Donald Boyce; George Brown; Robert Bell; Dennis Thomas; Claydes Smith; Taylor Dean; Black Mamba; Michael Debenedictus; Robert Mickens; Otha Nash; Meekaaeel Muhammed; Earl Toon; Brodie Williams	Easy Mo Bee	3:28
16.	"Unbelievable"	Wallace; Martin; Robert Kelly	DJ Premier	3:43
17.	"Suicidal Thoughts"	Wallace; Robert Hall	Lord Finesse	2:50
Total length:				69:05 (68:17 in the censored version)^{[c]}

Remaster bonus tracks
No.	Title	Writer(s)	Producer(s)	Length
18.	"Who Shot Ya?"	Wallace; Combs; Nashiem Myrick; Allie Wrubel; Herbert Magidson	Nashiem Myrick; Combs^{[a]}	5:19
19.	"Just Playing (Dreams)"	Wallace; Rashad Smith; James Brown; Fred Wesley	Rashad Smith	2:43
Total length:				77:03 (76:15 in the censored version)^{[c]}

Notes

- ^{^[a]} signifies a co-producer.
- ^{^[b]} Pete Rock claims to have created the beat for "Juicy" without receiving credit.
- ^{^[c]} The sex skit at the ending of "Respect" includes Faith Evans giving fellatio to Wallace. It is completely removed in the censored edition, taking out 48 seconds.
- "Intro", "Fuck Me (Interlude)", and "Friend of Mine" contain additional vocals from Lil' Kim.
- "One More Chance" and "Juicy" contain additional vocals from Total.
- "Respect" contains backing vocals from Diana King.
- "Me & My Bitch" contains additional vocals from Sybil Pennix.
- "Who Shot Ya?" was originally included as a bonus track on the original double vinyl issue in 1994.
- A single-disc condensed LP edition was originally available at the time of release, and has been sometimes repressed. Side A features "Juicy," "Gimme the Loot," "Machine Gun Funk" and "Warning"; Side B features "Unbelievable," "The What," "Respect," "One More Chance" and "Big Poppa."

=== Sample credits ===
"Intro"

- "Superfly" by Curtis Mayfield
- "Rapper's Delight" by Sugarhill Gang
- "Top Billin' by Audio Two
- "Tha Shiznit" by Snoop Dogg

"Things Done Changed"

- "California My Way" by the Main Ingredient
- "Summer Breeze" by the Main Ingredient
- "Vapors" by Biz Markie
- "Lil Ghetto Boy" by Dr. Dre

"Gimme the Loot"

- "Smokin' Cheeba-Cheeba" by Harlem Underground Band
- "Don’t Change Your Love" by the Five Stairsteps
- "Coldblooded" by James Brown
- "Singing in the Morning" by the Ohio Players (Later removed following a lawsuit)
- "Throw Ya Gunz" by Onyx
- "What They Hittin' Foe?" by Ice Cube
- "Just to Get a Rep" by Gang Starr
- "Scenario (Remix)" by A Tribe Called Quest

"Machine Gun Funk"

- "Something Extra" by Black Heat
- "Up for the Down Stroke" by the Horny Horns (Later removed following a lawsuit)
- "Chief Rocka" by Lords of the Underground

"Warning"

- "Walk on By" by Isaac Hayes
- "Thinking" by the Meters
- "Freak of the Week" by Funkadelic

"Ready to Die"

- "Hospital Prelude of Love Theme" by Willie Hutch
- "Sing a Simple Song" by Sly and the Family Stone
- "Yes, I'm Ready" by Barbara Mason
- "Ain't No Half Steppin'" by Big Daddy Kane
- "Two to the Head" by Kool G Rap & DJ Polo
- "Check It Out" by Grand Puba
- "Singing in the Morning" by Ohio Players (Later removed following a lawsuit)

"One More Chance"

- "Hydra" by Grover Washington, Jr.
- "All This Love" by DeBarge

"#!*@ Me (Interlude)"

- "Feenin'" by Jodeci

"The What"

- "Can't Say Enough About Mom" by Leroy Hutson
- "Overnight Sensation" by Avalanche

"Juicy"

- "Juicy Fruit ('Fruity' Instrumental Mix)" by Mtume

"Everyday Struggle"

- "Either Way" by Dave Grusin
- "Don't Change Your Love" by the Five Stairsteps

"Big Poppa"

- "Between the Sheets" by the Isley Brothers
- "Dolly My Baby (Bad Boy Extended Remix)" by Super Cat

"Respect"

- "I Get Lifted" by KC & the Sunshine Band

"Friend of Mine"

- "The Jam" by Graham Central Station
- "Seventh Heaven" by Gwen Guthrie
- "Vicious" by Black Mamba

"Unbelievable"

- "Impeach the President" by the Honey Drippers
- "Snow Creatures" by Quincy Jones
- "Your Body's Callin'" by R. Kelly

"Suicidal Thoughts"

- "Lonely Fire" by Miles Davis
- "Outside Love" by Brethren

"Who Shot Ya?"

- "I'm Afraid the Masquerade is Over" by David Porter

"Just Playing (Dreams)"

- "Blues and Pants" by James Brown
- "Spinning Wheel" by Lonnie Smith

== Personnel ==
- Notorious B.I.G. – writer, performer
- Sean "Puffy" Combs – executive producer, additional vocals, producer
- Mister Cee – associate executive producer
- Method Man – featured performer
- Lil' Kim – additional vocals
- Total – additional vocals
- Chucky Thompson – instruments, producer
- Nashiem Myrick – additional programming, producer
- Diana King – additional vocals
- Sybil Pennix – additional voice
- Easy Mo Bee – producer
- The Bluez Brothers – producer
- Jean "Poke" Oliver – producer
- DJ Premier – producer
- Lord Finesse – producer
- Darnell Scott – producer
- Rashad Smith – producer
- Bob "Bassy" Brockmann – recording, mixing
- Greg Pinto – recording, mixing
- Rich Travali – recording, mixing
- Mario Rodriquez – recording, mixing
- Charles "Prince" Alexander – recording, mixing
- Bill Esses – recording, mixing
- John Wydrycs – recording
- Norty Cotto – recording
- Eddie Sancho – mixing
- Butch Bel Air – photography
- Gwendolyn Watts – A&R coordination

== Charts ==
=== Weekly charts ===
Weekly chart performance
Chart (1994)	Peak position
French Albums (SNEP)	118
US Billboard 200	15
US Top R&B/Hip-Hop Albums (Billboard)	3

Chart (2004)	Peak position
Canadian R&B Albums (Nielsen SoundScan)	7

Chart (2021)	Peak position
Belgian Albums (Ultratop Flanders)	59
Belgian Albums (Ultratop Wallonia)	187
Finnish Albums (Suomen virallinen lista)	45
German Albums (Offizielle Top 100)	24
Hungarian Albums (MAHASZ)	20
Swiss Albums (Schweizer Hitparade)	67

=== Year-end charts ===
1994 year-end chart performance
Chart (1994)	Position
US Top R&B/Hip-Hop Albums (Billboard)	36

1995 year-end chart performance
Chart (1995)	Position
US Billboard 200	66
US Top R&B/Hip-Hop Albums (Billboard)	6

2002 year-end chart performance
Chart (2002)	Position
Canadian R&B Albums (Nielsen SoundScan)	149
Canadian Rap Albums (Nielsen SoundScan)	75

== Certifications ==
Certifications
Region	Certification	Certified units/sales
Canada (Music Canada)	3× Platinum	300,000^{‡}
Denmark (IFPI Danmark)	Platinum	20,000^{‡}
Italy (FIMI)	Gold	25,000^{‡}
New Zealand (RMNZ)	3× Platinum	45,000^{‡}
United Kingdom (BPI)	Platinum	300,000^{‡}
United States (RIAA)	6× Platinum	5,000,000
^{‡} Sales+streaming figures based on certification alone.

== See also ==
- Album era
- Bad Boy Records
- East Coast hip-hop
- Golden age hip-hop
