= Juicy (The Notorious B.I.G. song) =

Single by the Notorious B.I.G.

from the album Ready to Die
- B-side: "Unbelievable"
- Released: August 9, 1994
- Recorded: 1994
- Studio: The Hit Factory (New York City)
- Genre: East Coast hip-hop
- Length: 5:02
- Label: Bad Boy; Arista
- Songwriters: Christopher Wallace; Sean Combs; Jean-Claude Olivier; James Mtume
- Producers: Sean "Puffy" Combs; Poke

The Notorious B.I.G. singles chronology
"Party and Bullshit" (1993)	"Juicy" (1994)	"Flava in Ya Ear (Remix)" (1994)

Music video
- "Juicy" on YouTube

"Juicy" is the first single by the American rapper the Notorious B.I.G. from his debut album, Ready to Die (1994). It was produced by Poke of the duo Trackmasters and Sean Combs. "Juicy" contains a sample of Mtume's 1983 song, "Juicy Fruit", though it is directly sampled from the song's "Fruity Instrumental" mix, and has an alternative chorus sung by Bad Boy Records cohorts, the girl group Total and label founder Combs. The track is widely considered one of the greatest hip-hop tracks of all time.

== Music video ==
The music video for Juicy was directed by Sean Combs and premiered in August 1994. In it, the Notorious B.I.G. raps the song first on the stairs in front of a house and later in the form of an interview with a reporter as well as on the street, in prison and at a pool party. Individual scenes are based on the content of the song and show how the Notorious B.I.G. is arrested for selling drugs or arguing with his mother when they lived in poverty, while he now glorifies his wealth.

== Content ==
The song is a "rags-to-riches chronicle". The Notorious B.I.G. chronicles his childhood years living in poverty, his initial dreams of becoming a rapper, early musical influences, his time dealing drugs, criminal involvement, and his eventual success in the music industry and current lavish lifestyle.

One of the song's lines reads, "Time to get paid, blow up like the World Trade," referencing the February 26, 1993 bombing of the World Trade Center. This lyric was intended as a metaphor of the "explosive" growth of the Notorious B.I.G.'s wealth to the "explosion" of the World Trade Center (a financial hub) which happened around the same time. The Notorious B.I.G. was shot and killed in 1997, four years before the 9/11 attacks in 2001 that fully destroyed the buildings (the 1993 attacks only caused minor damage). In the aftermath of 9/11, radio stations (most notably WQHT "Hot 97" which was near the World Trade Center) altered their copies of "Juicy" to remove the words "World Trade" from the song, to avoid causing post traumatic stress disorder in 9/11 survivors (several media items were also altered around this time to prevent unintentionally recalling 9/11 due to general sensitivity around the attacks in the early 2000s). Because the Notorious B.I.G. died before 9/11 and because the 1993 attacks fell into obscurity due to the dramatic destruction and death toll of 9/11, conspiracy theories eventually came due to people unaware of the 1993 attacks believing that the Notorious B.I.G. had prior knowledge of 9/11 years before it happened and used this knowledge in the previously mentioned line of the song.

The editing of the song was inconsistent between mediums, affecting only radio stations while leaving the lyrics on the album, music video and download intact. Although many 9/11-related edits were reverted in the late 2000s and the early 2010s after enough distance of time of 9/11 had passed, the edit to "Juicy" remained in place by mistake. This resulted in people hearing "Juicy" on the radio with the edit, then playing the song on a CD or on the internet and hearing the lyrics intact, which can leave people wondering why it was censored. This has led to the conspiracy theories as well as two different about how the Notorious B.I.G. supposedly know about 9/11 despite the fact he died years before it happened. One version claims that the Notorious B.I.G. had powers of prophecy similar to the mystic Nostradamus which allowed him to see into the future and thus make an accurate prediction as a prophet. The other is that the Notorious B.I.G. was in fact a co-conspirator in the 9/11 attacks, having helped in some manner in planning the attacks, which according to the conspiracy theorists took years to plan and carry out, also claiming that the Notorious B.I.G.'s murder was part of the plan to keep the attacks secret before it happened. In 2017, Billboard Magazine publicly called for radio stations to remove their edit to "Juicy" and revert it to the original version where the words "World Trade" is heard, not only to remove the censorship but also to revive public awareness of the 1993 attacks.

== Production controversy ==
Producer Pete Rock alleged that Combs stole the idea for the original song's beat after hearing it at Rock's house. In an interview with Wax Poetics, he said:

I did the original version, didn't get credit for it. They came to my house, heard the beat going on the drum machine, it's the same story. You come downstairs at my crib, you hear music. He heard that shit and the next thing you know it comes out. They had me do a remix, but I tell people, and I will fight it to the end, that I did the original version of that. I'm not mad at anybody, I just want the correct credit.

Pete Rock's remix of "Juicy" uses the same sample as the original. During an appearance on the Juan Epstein Podcast, Rock said that he has no hard feelings about how "Juicy" came about, but wished he had gotten the proper credit, although he did admit to harboring some ill feelings at the time.

== Accolades ==
- Ego Trip ranked it number 1 on its Hip Hop's 40 Greatest Singles by Year 1980–98 list in 1999.
- Pitchfork Media ranked the song at number 14 on their Top 200 Tracks of the 1990s.
- Pop ranked it number 1 on their Singles of the Year list in 1994.
- Q ranked "Juicy" the ninth greatest hip hop song of all time.
- Rolling Stone ranked the song number 424 in its list of the 500 Greatest Songs of All Time, moving to #32 in the 2021 revision.
- Spex included it on the Best Singles of the Century list in 1999.
- The Boston Phoenix included it on their The 90 Best Songs of the 90s list in 1999.
- The Source included it on their 100 Best Rap Singles of All Time list in 1998.
- VH1 ranked it number 7 on its "100 Greatest Hip Hop Songs Ever", and number 1 on its "40 Greatest Hip Hop Songs of the 90s".
- BBC ranked it number 1 on its "Greatest Hip-Hop Songs of All Time".

== Track listing ==
=== 12-inch ===
A-side

1. "Juicy" (Dirty Mix) (5:05)
2. "Unbelievable" (3:45) (produced by DJ Premier)
3. "Juicy" (Remix) (4:42) (produced by Pete Rock)

B-side

1. "Juicy" (Instrumental) (5:05)
2. "Unbelievable" (instrumental) (3:45)
3. "Juicy" (remix instrumental) (4:43)

== Official versions ==
- "Juicy" (album version)
- "Juicy" (instrumental) – 5:05
- "Juicy" (dirty mix) – 5:05
- "Juicy" (remix) – 3:42
- "Juicy" (remix instrumental) – 4:43

== Charts ==
=== Weekly charts ===
Chart (1994–95)	Peak position
UK Singles (Official Charts)	72
UK Hip Hop/R&B (Official Charts)	16
UK Club Chart (Music Week)	58
US Billboard Hot 100	27
US Hot R&B/Hip-Hop Songs (Billboard)	14
US Hot Rap Singles (Billboard)	1
US Maxi-Singles Sales (Billboard)	1

=== Year-end charts ===
Chart (1994)	Position
US Maxi-Singles Sales (Billboard) with "Unbelievable"	11

== Certifications ==
Region	Certification	Certified units/sales
Canada (Music Canada)	7× Platinum	560,000^{‡}
Denmark (IFPI Danmark)	Gold	45,000^{‡}
Italy (FIMI) sales since 2009	Gold	50,000^{‡}
New Zealand (RMNZ)	6× Platinum	180,000^{‡}
United Kingdom (BPI)	3× Platinum	1,800,000^{‡}
United States (RIAA)	6× Platinum	6,000,000^{‡}
^{‡} Sales+streaming figures based on certification alone.
