= Born Again (The Notorious B.I.G. album) =

1999 compilation album by the Notorious B.I.G.

Compilation album by the Notorious B.I.G.
- Released: December 7, 1999
- Genre: East Coast hip-hop
- Length: 75:19
- Label: Bad Boy; Arista
- Producer: Daven "Prestige" Vanderpool; Timbaland; DJ Clark Kent; DJ Premier; Nottz; Mannie Fresh; Nashiem Myrick; Deric Angelettie; Clemont Mack; Andreao "Fanatic" Heard; Frankie Cutlass

The Notorious B.I.G. chronology
| Life After Death (1997) | Born Again (1999) | Duets: The Final Chapter (2005) |

Singles from Born Again
- 1. "Dead Wrong" Released: October 26, 1999; 2. "Notorious B.I.G." Released: December 11, 1999

Born Again is the first posthumous compilation album by American rapper the Notorious B.I.G., released by Bad Boy Records and Arista Records on December 7, 1999, two years after his death. It is composed primarily of early recorded verses with remixed beats and newly recorded guest vocals.

The album debuted at number one on the Billboard 200 chart with 485,000 albums sold in the first week, and was certified 2× Platinum by the RIAA on January 14, 2000 and has sold over 2,350,000 copies in the United States. Born Again received generally mixed reviews from music critics.

== Critical reception ==
Professional ratings
Review scores
| Source | Rating |
|---|---|
| AllMusic | 3/5 stars |
| Entertainment Weekly | B+ |
| Los Angeles Times | 3.5/4 stars |
| NME | 4/5 stars |
| Now | 1/5 stars |
| Pitchfork | 6.0/10 |
| Rolling Stone | 3/5 stars |
| The Rolling Stone Album Guide | 2/5 stars |
| The Source | 3/5 stars |
| Tom Hull | B+ |

The album generally received mixed reviews from critics. In a contemporary review for Rolling Stone, Touré wrote that the "album won't damage his legacy. But Born Again won't improve that legacy much, either." Rob Sheffield later wrote in The Rolling Stone Album Guide, "the posthumous Born Again proved Biggie was still dead, but his place in the MCs Hall of Fame remains untouchable." Robert Christgau, who gave the release a "dud" rating, later wrote, "Remember that posthumous outtakes CD Bad Boy attributed to Biggie? No? Good then—it was foul, not just ill shit but stupid ill shit."

== Track listing ==
Credits adapted from the album's liner notes.

| No. | Title | Writer(s) | Producer(s) | Length |
|---|---|---|---|---|
| 1. | "Born Again" (Intro) | Christopher Wallace | J-Dub; Harve "Joe Hooker" Pierre | 1:28 |
| 2. | "Notorious B.I.G." (featuring Lil' Kim and Puff Daddy) | Wallace; Daven Vanderpool; John Taylor; Nicholas Bates; Simon Le Bon | Daven "Prestige" Vanderpool; P. Diddy | 3:11 |
| 3. | "Dead Wrong" (featuring Eminem) | Al Green; Osten Harvey Jr.; Wallace; Marshall Mathers; Chucky Thompson | Chucky Thompson; P. Diddy; Mario "Yellow Man" Winans; Pierre^{[c]}; Easy Mo Bee^{[d]} | 4:57 |
| 4. | "Hope You Niggas Sleep" (featuring Hot Boys and Big Tymers) | Harvey Jr.; Wallace | Mannie Fresh; Easy Mo Bee^{[d]} | 4:10 |
| 5. | "Dangerous MC's" (featuring Mark Curry, Snoop Dogg, and Busta Rhymes) | Wallace; Trevor Smith; Mark Curry; Dominick Lamb; Calvin Broadus | Dominick "Nottz" Lamb; Pierre^{[c]} | 5:15 |
| 6. | "Biggie" (featuring Junior M.A.F.I.A.) | Nashiem Myrick; Wallace; Kimberly Jones; James Lloyd; Jamel Fisher; Antoine Spain; Wes Farrell; John Bahler | Nashiem Myrick; Pierre^{[c]} | 5:22 |
| 7. | "Niggas" | Wallace; Tony Dofat | P. Diddy; Ramahn "Jer-Z" Herbert; Clemont "Cash Us Clay" Mack; Winans^{[a]}; Tony Dofat^{[d]} | 3:48 |
| 8. | "Big Booty Hoes" (featuring Too Short) | Wallace; Vanderpool; David Mathews; Luther Campbell; Frankie Cutlass; Allen Toussaint | Vanderpool; Pierre^{[c]} | 3:27 |
| 9. | "Would You Die for Me" (featuring Lil’ Kim and Puff Daddy) | Vanderpool; Wallace; Jones; Sean Combs; Steven Jordan | P. Diddy; Vanderpool; Stevie J^{[d]} | 3:38 |
| 10. | "Come On" (with Sadat X) | Robert Hall; Wallace; Charles Aznavour; Don Black; Robert Gall; Gerry Goffin; Michael Masser | DJ Clark Kent; Lord Finesse^{[d]} | 4:35 |
| 11. | "Rap Phenomenon" (featuring Method Man & Redman) | Wallace; Christopher Martin; Clifford Smith; Reggie Noble; Thom Bell; Roland Chambers; Kenneth Gamble; Ike Lee; Tracey Lee | DJ Premier; Pierre^{[c]} | 4:02 |
| 12. | "Let Me Get Down" (featuring G-Dep, Craig Mack, and Missy "Misdemeanor" Elliott) | Deric Angelettie; Trevell Coleman; Craig Mack; Barry White | Deric "D-Dot" Angelettie; Pierre^{[c]} | 4:33 |
| 13. | "Tonight" (featuring Mobb Deep, Joe Hooker, and Puff Daddy) | Wallace; Robert Diggs; Kejuan Muchita; Albert Johnson; Harve Pierre; Nickolas Ashford; Valerie Simpson | P. Diddy; Chris "Cornbread" Cresco; Pierre^{[c]}; RZA^{[d]} | 6:08 |
| 14. | "If I Should Die Before I Wake" (featuring Black Rob, Ice Cube, and Beanie Sigel) | Angelettie; Eric Matlock; Henri Charlemagne; Robert Ross; O'Shea Jackson; Dwight Grant | Angelettie; Eric "Coptic" Matlock; Henri Charlemagne; Garrette "Blake" Smith^{[b]}; Pierre^{[c]} | 4:51 |
| 15. | "Who Shot Ya?" (Radio Edit) | Combs; Wallace; Myrick; Allie Wrubel; Herbert Magidson | Myrick | 3:48 |
| 16. | "Can I Get Witcha" (with Lil' Cease) | Carl Thompson; Wallace; Lloyd; LeRoy Bell; Casey James | Thompson | 3:36 |
| 17. | "I Really Want to Show You" (featuring Nas and K-Ci & JoJo) | Wallace; Ed Fox; Alan Scott | Andreao "Fanatic" Heard; P. Diddy; The Bluez Brothers^{[d]} | 5:09 |
| 18. | "Ms. Wallace" (Outro) | Voletta Wallace | Pierre; Voletta Wallace | 3:21 |

Notes

- ^{^[a]} signifies a co-producer
- ^{^[b]} signifies an additional producer
- ^{^[c]} signifies a vocal producer
- ^{^[d]} signifies the original producer

Sample credits

- "Notorious B.I.G." contains samples of "Notorious", written by John Taylor, Nicholas Bates, and Simon Le Bon; performed by Duran Duran.
- "Biggie" contains samples of "Hang Your Head in Shame", written by Wes Farrell and John Bahler, performed by New York City.
- "Dead Wrong" contains a sample of "I'm Glad You're Mine", written and performed by Al Green.
- "Big Booty Hoes" contains samples of "Crab Apple" written by David Mathews, performed by Idris Muhammad. It also contains samples of "Bust a Nut", written by Luther Campbell, Christopher Wallace, Frankie Cutlass and Allen Toussaint; performed by Luke.
- "Come On" contains samples of "For Mama", written by Charles Aznavour, Don Black, and Robert Gall; performed by Doc Severinsen. It also contains re-sung elements of "Theme from Mahogany", written by Gerry Goffin and Michael Masser.
- "Rap Phenomenon" contains samples of "Keep Your Hands High", written by Thom Bell, Roland Chambers, Kenneth Gamble, Ike Lee, Tracey Lee, and Christopher Wallace; performed by Tracey Lee.
- "Let Me Get Down" contains samples of "Love Serenade", written and performed by Barry White.
- "Tonight" contains samples of "Just Say Just Say", written by Nickolas Ashford and Valerie Simpson, performed by Diana Ross and Marvin Gaye.
- "Who Shot Ya" contains samples of "I'm Afraid the Masquerade is Over", written by Allie Wrubel and Herbert Magidson, performed by David Porter.
- "Can I Get Witcha" contains samples of "Livin' It Up (Friday Night)", written and performed by Bell and James.
- "I Really Want to Show You" contains samples of "Charisma", written by Ed Fox and Alan Scott, performed by Tom Browne.

== Charts ==
=== Weekly charts ===
| Chart (1999) | Peak position |
|---|---|
| Canadian Albums (Nielsen SoundScan) | 14 |
| German Albums (Offizielle Top 100) | 47 |
| Dutch Albums (Album Top 100) | 82 |
| UK Albums (OCC) | 70 |
| UK R&B Albums (OCC) | 9 |
| US Billboard 200 | 1 |
| US Top R&B/Hip-Hop Albums (Billboard) | 1 |

=== Year-end charts ===
| Chart (2000) | Position |
|---|---|
| US Billboard 200 | 45 |
| US Top R&B/Hip-Hop Albums (Billboard) | 9 |

== Certifications ==
| Region | Certification | Certified units/sales |
|---|---|---|
| United Kingdom (BPI) | Gold | 100,000^{*} |
| United States (RIAA) | 2× Platinum | 2,000,000^{^} |
^{*} Sales figures based on certification alone.^{^} Shipments figures based on certification alone.

== See also ==
- List of number-one albums of 1999 (U.S.)
- List of number-one R&B albums of 1999 (U.S.)
