= Big Daddy Kane discography =

- Studio albums: 7
- Singles: 14

The discography of Big Daddy Kane, an American rapper, consists of seven studio albums and fourteen singles.

== Studio albums ==
List of studio albums, with selected chart positions and certifications
Title	Album details	Peak chart positions			Certifications
Title	Album details	US	US R&B /HH	UK	Certifications
Long Live the Kane	Released: June 28, 1988; Label: Cold Chillin'; Format: CD, LP, cassette, digital download, streaming	116	5	—	RIAA: Gold
It's a Big Daddy Thing	Released: September 19, 1989; Label: Cold Chillin'; Format: CD, LP, cassette, digital download, streaming	33	4	37	RIAA: Gold
Taste of Chocolate	Released: October 30, 1990; Label: Cold Chillin'; Format: CD, LP, cassette, digital download, streaming	37	10	—	
Prince of Darkness	Released: October 29, 1991; Label: Cold Chillin'; Format: CD, LP, cassette, digital download, streaming	57	25	—	
Looks Like a Job For...	Released: May 25, 1993; Label: Cold Chillin'; Format: CD, LP, cassette, digital download, streaming	52	9	—	
Daddy's Home	Released: September 13, 1994; Label: MCA; Format: CD, LP, cassette, digital download, streaming	155	26	—	
Veteranz' Day	Released: April 28, 1998; Label: Mercury; Format: CD, LP, cassette, digital download, streaming	—	62	—	
"—" denotes a recording that did not chart or was not released in that territory.

== Singles ==
=== As lead artist ===
List of singles, with selected chart positions, showing year released and album name
Title	Year	Peak chart positions					Album
Title	Year	US	US R&B	US Rap	UK	UK R&B	Album
"Get Into It"	1987	—	—	—	—	—	Non-album single
"Raw"	1987	—	—	—	88	—	Colors (soundtrack) / Long Live the Kane
"Ain't No Half Steppin'"	1988	—	53	—	—	—	Long Live the Kane
"Set It Off"	1988	—	—	—	95	—	Long Live the Kane
"I'll Take You There"	1989	—	73	21	—	—	Long Live the Kane
"Rap Summary (Lean on Me)"	1989	—	—	9	52	—	Lean on Me (soundtrack) / It's a Big Daddy Thing
"Wrath of Kane"	1989	—	—	—	52	—	It's a Big Daddy Thing
"Smooth Operator"	1989	—	11	1	65	—	It's a Big Daddy Thing
"I Get the Job Done"	1990	—	27	9	—		It's a Big Daddy Thing
"Ain't No Stoppin' Us Now"	1990	—	—	—	44	—	It's a Big Daddy Thing
"To Be Your Man"	1990	—	—	—	—	—	It's a Big Daddy Thing
"Cause I Can Do It Right"	1990	—	22	4	—	—	Taste of Chocolate
"All of Me" (with Barry White)	1991	—	14	—	—	—	Just for You /Taste of Chocolate
"It's Hard Being the Kane"	1991	—	91	17	—	—	Taste of Chocolate
"Keep 'Em on the Floor" (featuring Barbara Weathers)	1991	—	—	—	—	—	Taste of Chocolate
"Raw '91"	1991	—	—	—	—	—	Prince of Darkness
"Groove with It"	1992	—	24	2	—	—	Prince of Darkness
"The Lover in You"	1992	—	26	28	—	—	Prince of Darkness
"How U Get a Record Deal?"	1993	—	86	7	—	—	Looks Like a Job For...
"Very Special" (featuring DJ Spinderella)	1993	31	23	9	—	—	Looks Like a Job For...
"Gunman"	1994	—	—	—	—	—	Gunmen (soundtrack)
"In the PJ's"	1994	—	— (Note: "I'm a D-Boy" did not enter the Hot R&B/Hip-Hop Songs chart, but peaked at number 30 on the Hot R&B/Hip-Hop Singles Sales chart.)	31	—	—	Daddy's Home
"Uncut, Pure"	1998	— (Note: "I Go On" did not enter the Billboard Hot 100, but peaked at number 11 on the Bubbling Under Hot 100.)	60	9	98	14	Veteranz' Day
"Hold It Down"(featuring Der Wolf)	1998	—	—	—	98	14	Veteranz' Day
"Any Type of Way"	2003	—	— (Note: "I'm a D-Boy" did not enter the Hot R&B/Hip-Hop Songs chart, but peaked at number 30 on the Hot R&B/Hip-Hop Singles Sales chart.)	—	—	—	Essential Underground Hip Hop 1
"Just Rhymin' with Biz" (Note: "Just Rhymin' with Biz" was released as a split single with "Make the Music with Your Mouth, Biz" by Biz Markie feat. TJ Swan.)	2010	—	—	—	—	—	Long Live the Kane
"Sing My Song" (Note: "Sing My Song" and "Give a Demonstration" was released as a split single with "Simple Metaphore" and "Ain’t It Good To You (Remix)" by Ultramagnetic MC's.)	2012	—	—	—	—	—	Non-album single
"Nite & Day" (with Marco Polo)	2013	—	—	—	—	—	Newport Authority 2
"Set It Off" (re-release)	2019	—	—	—	— (Note: "Set It Off" did not enter the UK Singles Chart, but peaked at number 96 on the UK Physical Singles Chart.)	—	Long Live the Kane
"Enough!" (featuring Chuck D & Loren Oden)	2020	—	—	—	—	—	Non-album singles
"Fly Till I Die" (with Kool G Rap)	2022	—	—	—	—	—	Last of a Dying Breed
"Slap" (with Busta Rhymes & Conway the Machine)	2022	—	—	—	—	—	The Fuse Is Lit
"—" denotes a recording that did not chart or was not released in that territory.

== Guest appearances ==
List of guest appearances, with other performing artists, showing year released and album name
Title	Year	Other artist(s)	Album
"The Symphony"	1988	Marley Marl, Masta Ace, Craig G, Kool G Rap	In Control, Volume 1
"Loosey's Rap (Loosey's House of Trix Mix)"	1988	Rick James, Roxanne Shante	Loosey's Rap single
"Prologue (2Q's Rap)"	1989	Quincy Jones	Back on the Block
"Jazz Corner of the World"	1989	Quincy Jones, Kool Moe Dee	Back on the Block
"Burn Hollywood Burn"	1990	Public Enemy, Ice Cube	Fear of a Black Planet
"Who's Skatin' Promo"	1991	De La Soul, Dres. Russell Simmons	A Roller Skating Jam Named "Saturdays" single
"Don't Curse"	1991	Heavy D & the Boyz, Grand Puba, Kool G Rap, Q-Tip, Pete Rock & CL Smooth	Peaceful Journey
"Feels Like Another One"	1991	Patti LaBelle	Burnin' single
"Heal Yourself"	1991	Freddie Foxxx, Harmony, Jam Master Jay, KRS-One, Kid Capri, LL Cool J, MC Lyte, Ms. Melodie, Queen Latifah, Run-DMC	Civilization vs. Technology single
"The Symphony (Part II)"	1991	Marley Marl, Craig G, Little Daddy Shane, Kool G Rap, Masta Ace	In Control Volume II (For Your Steering Pleasure) single
"Nuff Respect"	1992	n/a	Juice (soundtrack)
"Angel Don't"	1992	Morris Day	Guaranteed
"A Job Ain't Nuthin' but Work"	1992	Big Daddy Kane, Lo-Key?	Mo' Money (soundtrack)
"#1 with a Bullet"	1992	Kool G Rap, DJ Polo	Live and Let Die
"Close the Crackhouse"	1993	Professor X the Overseer, Chuck D, etc.	Puss N' Boots (The Struggle Continues....)
"We wit' It"	1994	Treacherous Three, Chuck D, Grandmaster Caz, Heavy D, Melle Mel, Tito	Old School Flava
"Pass It Off (Underground Mix)"	1994	Shyheim, Rubbabandz, Pops da Brown Hornet	single
"In the Game"	1995	Red Hot Lover Tone, Rich Nice	#1 Playa
"Make Up Your Mind" (The Dave "Jam" Hall Flavor Remix)	1996	Assorted Phlavors	single
"Too Late Playa"	1996	MC Hammer, 2Pac, Nuttso, Danny Boy	Too Tight (unreleased)
"Wherever U R (Sho' Shot)"	1996	2Pac	One Nation (unreleased)
"The Cypher (Part III)"	1997	Frankie Cutlass, Craig G, Roxanne Shante, Biz Markie	Politics & Bullshit
"3 to the Dome"	1999	Sway & King Tech, Chino XL, Kool G Rap	This or That
"Macula's Theory"	1999	Prince Paul	A Prince Among Thieves
"Platinum Plus"	2000	Big L	The Big Picture
"Class of '87"	2000	Tony Touch, KRS-One, Kool G Rap	The Piece Maker
"The Man: The Icon"	2001	DJ Babu	Duck Season Vol. 1
"Three's Company"	2001	Marley Marl	Re-Entry
"The Jump Off"	2001	n/a	Eastern Conference All Stars
"Discosis"	2001	Bran Van 3000, Dimitri from Paris	Discosis
"Loaded"	2001	Bran Van 3000	Discosis
"Stick Up"	2002	Afu-Ra	Life Force Radio
"A Day at the Races"	2002	Jurassic 5, Percee P	Power in Numbers
"Off Limits"	2002	Aphrodite	Aftershock
"What's Your Name"	2003	Morcheeba	Parts of the Process (The Very Best of Morcheeba)
"Welcome to Durham"	2004	Little Brother	The Chitlin' Circuit - The Mixtape
"5 Deadly Venoms"	2006	DJ Kay Slay, Greg Street, Ghostface Killah, Raekwon, Kool G Rap, Lord Tariq	The Champions: North Meets South
"We Do"	2006	Snoop Dogg	Tha Blue Carpet Treatment Mixtape
"Cameo Afro"	2007	RZA, GZA, Suga Bang Bang	Afro Samurai: The Album
"Brooklyn" (Remix)	2007	Joell Ortiz, Cashmere, Maino, Solomon	The Brick: Bodega Chronicles
"Bed Stuy Represent"	2007	Domingo	Most Underrated
"The Garden"	2007	DJ Jazzy Jeff	The Return of the Magnificent
"Next Up"	2007	UGK, Kool G Rap	Underground Kingz
"Mega Fresh X"	2009	Cormega, DJ Red Alert, Parish Smith, Grand Puba, KRS-One	Born and Raised
"When I Get There"	2009	Grandmaster Flash, Hedonis Da Amazon	The Bridge (Concept of a Culture)
"Unpredictable"	2009	Grandmaster Flash, Syndee	The Bridge (Concept of a Culture)
"The Power of Music"	2009	Kristine W	The Power of Music
"Young Black with a Gift"	2010	Rapsody	Return of the B-Girl
"History"	2011	The Game, Doug E. Fresh, KRS-One	Purp & Patron
"Think I Am"	2012	Masta Ace, MF Doom	MA Doom: Son of Yvonne
"Fight to the Death"	2013	Waxine, Afu Ra	Mind Your Own Business
"One Foot in the Door"	2014	Saigon	G.S.N.T. 3: The Troubled Times of Brian Carenard
"Kill at Will: The Final Chapter"	2016	Domingo, Joell Ortiz, Chris Rivers, Token	Generation Next
"Get It Baby"	2016	Tito Jackson	Tito Time
"Hot Saucer"	2017	Bootsy Colins	Worldwide Funk
"Done It Again"	2018	Ghostface Killah, Cappadonna	The Lost Tapes
"Fresh"	2019	PMD, KRS-One, Grand Puba	Mr. Slow Flow
"Hot Like a Sauna"	2019	Connie Price and the Keystones, Rapsody, The Lady of Rage	Lucas High
"Grown Man"	2022	Morris Day	Last Call
"You Don't Want It"	2022	Prodigy, DJ Scratch	The Hegelian Dialectic 2 (The Book of Heroine)
"Woman"	2024	MC Lyte	One
"Estilo Libre"	2024	Residente, Vico C	Las Letras Ya No Importan
