= Groove with It =

Single by Big Daddy Kane

from the album Prince of Darkness
- Released: October 17, 1991
- Recorded: 1991
- Genre: Hip hop
- Length: 5:02
- Label: Cold Chillin' / Warner Bros.
- Songwriter: Antonio Hardy
- Producer: Michael Stokes

Big Daddy Kane singles chronology
"Raw '91" (1991)	"Groove with It" (1991)	"The Lover in You" (1992)

"Groove with It" is the first single released from Big Daddy Kane's fourth studio album, Prince of Darkness.

Though Prince of Darkness was both a critical and commercial disappointment, "Groove with It" became the second highest-charting single of Kane's career, peaking at number two on the Billboard Hot Rap Singles chart, behind only "Smooth Operator", which made it to number one on the rap charts.

== Single track listing ==
1. "Groove with It" (Album Version) – 5:04
2. "Groove with It" (Instrumental) – 4:59

== Charts ==
=== Weekly charts ===
Chart (1991/1992)	Peak position
Billboard Hot R&B/Hip-Hop Singles & Tracks	24
Billboard Hot Rap Singles	2

=== Year-end charts ===
Chart (1992)	Position
US Hot Rap Singles (Billboard)	17
