= Ebro Darden =

American radio personality

- Born: Ibrahim Jamil Darden; March 17, 1975 (age 51)
- Occupations: Broadcaster; radio personality; disc jockey
- Years active: 1990–present
- Known for: Hot 97 radio personality Beats1 DJ
- Children: 2

Ibrahim Jamil "Ebro" Darden (born March 17, 1975) is a former American radio personality, broadcaster, and DJ at WQHT (Hot 97 in New York City). Until 2014, he was Vice President of Programming for Emmis Communications' New York contemporary urban station WQHT (Hot 97). He was a co-host of the Hot 97 morning show Ebro in the Morning, alongside Peter Rosenberg and Laura Stylez until announcing the show's cancelation on December 12, 2025. As of 2015, Darden also hosts a hip hop music-based radio show on Apple Music 1.

== Early life ==
Darden was born to a Black father and a Jewish mother. He attended a Pentecostal church and Hebrew school while growing up in Oakland and Sacramento.

== Career ==
=== Start in radio ===
Darden began his career in radio in 1990 at KSFM in Sacramento, California, while he was still a teenager. At KSFM he worked in research and as a sales runner until moving into programming as an intern, and later co-hosting for KSFM's night and morning shows. In 1997, he worked at KBMB in Sacramento as programming and music director, as well as an afternoon host. Eventually, Darden became operations manager at KBMB, while also co-hosting mornings at KXJM in Portland, Oregon, in 1999.

=== Hot 97 ===
In 2003, Darden became music director for WQHT, ultimately becoming the program director for the station in 2007.

Darden worked alongside several past WQHT Hot 97 morning show co-hosts including Star and Buckwild, Miss Jones, DJ Envy, Sway, and Joe Budden from 2004 to 2007, and introduced Cipha Sounds and Peter Rosenberg to the AM drive in 2009. He rejoined the Hot 97 Morning Show in 2012, alongside Cipha Sounds, Peter Rosenberg, and Laura Stylez.

As programming director and on-air host, Darden was the main voice of several events at Hot 97 including Nicki Minaj's relationship with the station, and her alleged sexual relationship with the host; Hurricane Sandy; and Mister Cee's personal life.

In 2014, VH1 announced a new unscripted comedy series, This Is Hot 97, which featured Darden and fellow hosts including Angie Martinez, Funkmaster Flex, Peter Rosenberg, Cipha Sounds, Miss Info, and Laura Stylez.

Darden's tenure at Hot 97 ended with the cancellation of Ebro in the Morning on December 12, 2025. Darden attributed the cancellation to his outspoken political views and the need for MediaCo, the parent company of WQHT, to appease advertisers, among other factors.

=== Radio Syndication ===
In September 2020, Ebro in the Morning with Laura Stylez and Rosenberg launched via Superadio Networks. Inside Radio

=== Apple Music 1 ===
Darden is now one of three anchor DJs on Apple Music 1 an internet radio service from Apple Music. He is also the Global Editorial Head of Hip-Hop and R&B for Apple Music.

== Feuds and controversy ==
A comedic rivalry between Darden and fellow accomplished radio personality Charlamagne tha God of Power 105.1 has been ongoing for years. In May 2017, Darden clarified their relationship, stating, "The stuff we do on the radio is stupid. It's for fun. I make fun of you for fun. That's it. It's not that deep... me and that dude don't have a personal problem... a personal relationship".

Darden was mentioned in Remy Ma's "shETHER" diss track, on which Ma insinuated that he slept with Nicki Minaj by stating "Coke head, you cheated on your man with Ebro". After jokingly going back and forth with both Ma and her husband Papoose on social media, Darden denied the rumors, stating that he and Minaj had only a professional relationship.

Ebro has been in an ongoing feud with Brooklyn artist 6ix9ine. Ebro made fun of 6ix9ine as looking like a clown and criticized him for bragging about streaming numbers.

== Personal life ==
Darden has two daughters, born in 2014 and 2024.

== Recognition ==
In 2013, Darden was recognized by Radio Ink as a future African American leader.

== Filmography ==
TelevisionMusic Videos
Year	Title	Role	Notes
2013	Love & Hip Hop: New York	Himself	Guest star
2014	This Is Hot 97	Himself	Main cast
Year	Title	Role	Notes
1997	Step into a World	Himself	Miscellaneous extra
