= WIOV =

WIOV may refer to:

- WIOV-FM, a radio station (105.1 FM) licensed to serve Ephrata, Pennsylvania, United States
- WRLD (AM), a radio station (1240 AM) licensed to serve Reading, Pennsylvania, which held the call sign WIOV from 1993 to 2023
