= The Flip Squad =

American hip hop group (1995–1998)

Flip Squad
- Also known as: Flip Squad Allstars
- Origin: New York City, U.S.
- Genres: Hip hop
- Years active: 1995–1998
- Labels: MCA, Strapped
- Past members: Funkmaster Flex; Big Kap; Biz Markie; Mister Cee; DJ Enuff; Cipha Sounds; Frankie Cutlass; DJ Riz; Mark Ronson; DJ Doo Wop

The Flip Squad was formed in 1995 as a group of the New York City hip-hop DJs. Curated by Funkmaster Flex, the group was originally a duo consisting of producers Big Kap and Bootleg. An extended roster was introduced in 1998 and billed as the Flip Squad Allstars, which included Funkmaster Flex, Biz Markie, DJ Enuff, Mister Cee, Cipha Sounds, Frankie Cutlass, DJ Riz, "Da BounceMasta" DJ Doo Wop and Mark Ronson. The group released an album titled The Flip Squad All-Star DJs on MCA in November 1998.
