= This Is Hot 97 =

- Genre: Reality-based docu-comedy
- Created by: Mona Scott-Young; Ebro Darden
- Starring: Angie Martinez; Cipha Sounds; Ebro Darden; Funkmaster Flex; Laura Stylez; Miss Info; Peter Rosenberg
- Country of origin: United States
- Original language: English
- No. of seasons: 1
- No. of episodes: 8

Production
- Executive producers: Brad Abramson; Ian Gelfand; Mala Chapple; Mona Scott-Young; Stefan Springman; Stephen Mintz; Susan Levison; Toby Barraud
- Camera setup: Multiple-camera
- Running time: 22 minutes
- Production companies: Monami Entertainment; Eastern TV

Original release
- Network: VH1
- Release: March 31 – May 19, 2014

Related
- Love & Hip Hop

This Is Hot 97 is a reality-based docu-comedy television series that debuted on VH1 on March 31, 2014. The series is executive produced by Mona Scott-Young for Monami Entertainment, Toby Barraud, Stefan Springman, Mala Chapple and Ian Gelfand for Eastern, and Susan Levison, Brad Abramson and Stephen Mintz for VH1.

== Synopsis ==
This Is Hot 97 chronicles the lives of the air staffers and employees who work at Rhythmic Top 40 outlet WQHT/New York City, using a combination of their real life personas mixed in with unscripted and improvised comedic elements.

== Cast ==
- DJ NAIM
- Ebro Darden
- Funkmaster Flex
- Laura Stylez
- Peter Rosenberg

== Episodes ==
No.	Title	Original release date	U.S. viewers (millions)
1	"Not That Kind of Show"	March 31, 2014	1.43
Ebro informs the air staff that VH1 is doing a reality show about Hot 97, but everyone have their own ideas which goes to their heads, as Cipha and Rosenberg decide to take over the program; Angie is upset that Flex is getting more tweets than she is, and at every second when she's around him; Ebro, who wants to get celebrities to appear on the show, presents the idea to Macklemore (who is upset that Ebro would prefer Justin Timberlake over him) and gets turned down by Kanye West, who just did a segment with Angie while the cameras was rolling, but afterwards tells Ebro he doesn't do television. Mike Tyson and Maino visits the station.
2	"The Ménage"	April 7, 2014	0.84
Rosenberg is invited to appear on VH1 Big Morning Buzz, where his interest in (former host) Carrie Keagan's breast also attracts the attention of his wife Alexa, who also appears on Carrie's program after she is led to believe by Ebro and Cipha that Rosenberg is "dating" Carrie, which also blows out of proportion; Info is wondering who is stealing her food, prompting real culprit Flex to find a fall guy to blame by spending time with Mack Wilds, who also help Enuff out after Angie criticizes his video game skills.
3	"Training Day"	April 14, 2014	1.16
In an effort to place a zero tolerance policy at the station on and off the air, Ebro decides its time to have the WQHT air staff take sensitivity training after Rosenberg makes an inappropriate comment about Laura's chest, which is followed by Laura, Angie, Cipha and Rosenberg making comments about "balls" that get out of hand when Rosenberg places his crotch too close to Cipha's face, that is later followed by Angie touching Coco Austin's ass when she shows up for an interview with Angie and teaches her how to squat correctly, leading to the male staffers taking photos of this "incident." But the first training session makes matters worse as everyone involved starts making more offensive comments at each other. The situation later makes matters even worse when Flex introduces a talking doll based on his likeness that uses offensive language. This prompts Ebro's boss, Station Manager Alex Cameron, who wants Ebro to tell Flex that the doll "is faulty as Flex's ears," to take action into his own hands and forces the entire air staff to take a weekend sensitivity course. Meanwhile, Rosenberg feels slighted by Mike Tyson after the former boxer visits the station during Cipha and Rosenberg's show and incorrectly calls out the latter's first name as "Dave", not knowing that the staffers are in on the flub because Rosenberg is a fan of Tyson.
4	"Holy Mackleroni"	April 21, 2014	0.99
Ebro decides to hold a surprise party for Macklemore as a way to make up for dissing him after he won his Grammy award, and puts Laura in charge of the festivities. The only problem is she has to work with only a $5 budget, but thanks to Flex and Info, she finds a way to stretch it; Angie cashes in on donations for her son's candy drive by sweetening the pot with money she hustles and scams out of Maino, Flex, and Info; Cipha and Maino play mind games on Rosenberg's Jewish psyche.
5	"Infinity"	April 28, 2014	0.95
Angie is looking for a new vehicle, and Flex has no problem in helping her find that new car smell, since he happens to own a dealership-like assortment of rides to choose from; Laura and Karlie discovers that Ebro might have a girlfriend after they notice glitter on him and later finds a gift bag he had in his possession; Cipha admits to Rosenberg that he had a crush on Ricki Lake (which dates back to her 1993-2004 television series), but when he notices an intern dressed in attire similar to how Lake dressed on the show, he tries to find a way to meet her and see if she is the real Ricki. Jadakiss and The Lox make cameos.
6	"Odd Couples"	May 5, 2014	1.09
Angie and Roseberg take time out from their schedule to get a facial, not knowing that they just missed an important meeting involving a client; Info tries to keep Action Bronson at a distance after he makes a move on her; Flex attempt to avoid Stevie J and Joseline Hernandez after he loses to both of them during a poker game.
7	"Gutter Ball"	May 12, 2014	0.88
When Cipha and Laura discover Rick Ross' passion for bowling, they attempt to get him to join their bowling team. Meanwhile, Ebro gets unlikely advice from a visiting Wale after he discovers that he not that popular among his listeners based on his likability. French Montana and DJ Khaled make cameos.
8	"The Turn Up"	May 19, 2014	0.95
The WQHT air staffers, in an effort to secure a second season of This Is Hot 97, pulls all the stops to attract more viewers. Meanwhile, Angie is enticed with an offer from Black Thought to do a sex tape, and Iggy Azalea responds to Rosenberg's claims that the Australian rapper's ass is laced with injections.
