= WRLD =

WRLD may refer to:

- WRLD (AM), a radio station (1240 AM) licensed to serve Reading, Pennsylvania, United States
- WRLD-LD, a low-power television station (channel 30) licensed to serve Kingston, Pennsylvania
- WMJB (FM), a radio station (95.3 FM) licensed to serve Valley, Alabama, United States, which held the call sign WRLD-FM from 1994 to 2010 and WRLD from 2010 to 2023
- Juice WRLD, an American rapper
