= Long Live the Kane =

Studio album by Big Daddy Kane
- Released: June 21, 1988
- Recorded: 1987–1988
- Genre: Golden age hip-hop
- Length: 46:40
- Label: Cold Chillin'; Warner Bros.
- Producer: Marley Marl

Big Daddy Kane chronology
Long Live the Kane (1988)	It's a Big Daddy Thing (1989)

Singles from Long Live the Kane
- 1. "Raw" Released: 1988; 2. "Ain't No Half-Steppin'" Released: 1988; 3. "Set It Off" Released: 1988; 4. "I'll Take You There" Released: 1988

Long Live the Kane is the debut album by American rapper Big Daddy Kane, released by Cold Chillin' Records on June 21, 1988. It was produced by Marley Marl and the 45 King, and established Kane and Marley Marl as premier artists during hip hop's golden age. Kane displayed his unique rapping technique while covering topics including love ("I'll Take You There"), Afrocentricity ("Word to the Mother (Land)") and his rapping prowess ("Set It Off"). Marley Marl and Big Daddy Kane display a sparse production style, creating beats with fast-paced drums and lightly utilized James Brown samples.

Four singles were released in promotion of Kane's first album: "Raw/Word to the Mother (Land)," "Ain't No Half-Steppin'/Get Into It," "I'll Take You There/Wrath of Kane" and "Set It Off/Get Into It." The most commercially successful of these singles were "Ain't No Half-Steppin'", which reached #53 on the Hot R&B/Hip-Hop Singles & Tracks chart, and "I'll Take You There", which reached #73 on the same chart, but also peaked at #21 on the Hot Rap Singles chart. The other two singles did not chart, but "Raw" and "Set It Off" popularized Big Daddy Kane's high-speed style and abundant use of word play. "Raw" and "Ain't No Half Steppin'" are both described as "underground sensation[s]" and "classic[s]" by Allmusic's Steve Huey. "Raw" does not appear on Long Live the Kane, but a remix which utilizes the same beat does.

Big Daddy Kane's debut album contains many tracks that were later featured on greatest hits compilations. "Ain't No Half Steppin'" alone is featured on The Very Best of Big Daddy Kane, Marley Marl's House of Hits, two "best of" Cold Chillin' Records compilations and over five additional hip-hop hit compilations. Notwithstanding "Ain't No Half Steppin'," The Very Best of Big Daddy Kane contains five songs from Kane's debut album. Allmusic's Steve Huey regards "'Raw,' 'Set It Off,' and 'Ain't No Half-Steppin' [as] flawless bids for immortality [that] haven't lost an ounce of energy."

The album is broken down track-by-track by Big Daddy Kane in Brian Coleman's book Check the Technique.

== Recording and production ==
As is the case with many Juice Crew associated projects on the Cold Chillin' label, the production was handled by legendary beatmaker Marley Marl. This has become a source of contention among many former artists on the label, Big Daddy Kane included. According to these artists, Marl was not really responsible for the production on their songs, arguing that he contributed little to no creative input beyond engineering and programming the drums. Marl has countered the artists claims by suggesting that the rappers had limited knowledge of production equipment, and would have not gotten the same signature "boom bap" sound that was unique to the producer.

In reality, many Juice Crew rappers would indeed bring in records that they wished to sample, and choose which parts they wished to rhyme over. Marl would then hook the beat up on a sampler, and give it his characteristic sound. This artistic synergy resulted in songs like "Ain't No Half Steppin'", which according to Kane, Marl initially disapproved of because of its multiple samples. Others were already full songs before being programmed, such as "Just Rhymin' With Biz" and "Set It Off". "Set It Off" was originally made by The 45 King, and was intended for Biz Markie. However, Kane heard it and liked the James Brown sound it had, asking 45 King for the beat. The 45 King sped up the beat, and gave the song its signature sampled hook.

== Legacy and influence ==
Big Daddy Kane's debut album is one of the most influential hip hop albums from the Golden Era. Kane's lyrics have been sampled and reused, his rapping style has been emulated as well as the beats. Nas' "Where Are They Now" – a tribute to hip hop's unknown legends – not only references Big Daddy Kane's group, the Juice Crew, but uses the same James Brown sample ("Get Up, Get Into It, Get Involved") that Marley Marl used on "Set It Off." In addition, lyrics from "Just Rhymin' with Biz" have been sampled by Pete Rock & CL Smooth ("I Get Physical," "The Main Ingredient," "In the Flesh" and "Get on the Mic"), AMG ("Jiggable Pie"), AZ ("Rather Unique"), the Stieber Twins ("PBB Get's Physical"), Big L ("M.V.P."), Gang Starr ("Here Today, Gone Tomorrow"), the Beastie Boys ("So What'cha Want"), Real Live ("Real Live Shit (Remix)"), RZA ("Cameo Afro") and interpolated by Masta Ace ("Nostalgia" by Marco Polo) and Brother Ali ("Star Quality"). "Ain't No Half Steppin'" has also been sampled by various artists including Nice & Smooth ("No Delayin'"), Ed O.G. & Da Bulldogs ("I'm Different"), The Notorious B.I.G. ("Ready to Die"), Jeru the Damaja ("Frustrated Nigga"), Elzhi ("Talkin' In My Sleep"), People Under The Stairs ("Youth Explosion"), the Hieroglyphics ("One Life, One Love"), Blackalicious ("A To G"), K-Solo ("Letterman") and MF Doom ("Potholderz"). In addition, Gang Starr samples vocals from "Word to the Mother (Land)" on "Manifest", Mr. Lif samples vocals from "Raw (Remix)" on "Live from the Plantation", and Celph Titled and Buckwild sample a vocal from "Rhymin with Biz" on "Eraserheads."

On "The Listening," a 2002 song by Little Brother, rapper Phonte reminisces about the Golden Age and his influences stating:

"Back when 'fresh' was the word, and 'Raw' was on Prism/
Marley on the boards, plus Kane was Long Livin'/
G Rap and Ace spittin' murderous/
Bought Long Live the Kane, sat down and learned every word of it/
Sneakin' my Walkman in the homeroom, playin' it/
Listen for punch lines, delivery and cadences"

== Reception ==
Professional ratings
Review scores
Source	Rating
AllMusic	4.5/5 stars
The Encyclopedia of Popular Music	4/5 stars
Los Angeles Times	3/4 stars
MusicHound R&B	4.5/5 stars
The Philadelphia Inquirer	3/4 stars
The Rolling Stone Album Guide	4/5 stars
The Source	5/5 stars
The Village Voice	B

In 1998, the album was selected as one of The Source's 100 Best Rap Albums. In 1999, ego trip ranked it as the sixth best hip hop album released in 1988. In 1989, Spin placed it at number twenty in their list of the best albums of all time. Nas ranked the album as one of his 25 Favorite Albums.

It was certified as gold by the Recording Industry Association of America in 1989, and it remains as one of only two of Kane's albums to have sold over 500,000 copies. The other Big Daddy Kane album to reach gold status, It's a Big Daddy Thing, is the only album said to rival Long Live the Kane as the rapper's best album. AllMusic's Stanton Swihart contributes the positive reception of Long Live the Kane to Big Daddy Kane's versatility and personality:

Even though he spends a good 90% of the album boasting about his skills and abilities on the microphone, and cutting those of other MCs, Big Daddy Kane consistently proves himself a thrilling artist on his debut album, Long Live the Kane, one of the most appealing creations from the original new school of rap. This debut captures the Big Daddy Kane who rocked the house at hip-hop clubs and verbally cut up any and all comers in the late '80s with his articulate precision and locomotive power – the Big Daddy Kane who became an underground legend, the Big Daddy Kane who had the sheer verbal facility and razor-clean dexterity to ambush any MC and exhilarate anyone who witnessed or heard him perform. There are missteps here, to be sure – especially "The Day You're Mine," on which Kane casts himself as a loverman over a stilted drum machine and lackluster, cheesily seductive singing (offering a glimpse of the particular corner into which he would eventually paint himself). But there are also plenty of legitimate early hip-hop classics, none of which have lost an ounce of their power, and all of which serve as reminders of a time and era when hip-hop felt immediate, exciting, fresh, and a little bit dangerous (in the figurative, rather than literal, sense), and when hip-hop spawned commercial tastes of the moment rather than surrendering to them. Although his next album would be nearly the artistic equal of the debut – and, in many ways, even bettered it – Big Daddy Kane would never sound as compelling or as fresh as on this first effort.

== Track listing ==
- All songs produced by Marley Marl.

No.	Title	Writer(s)	Length
1.	"Long Live the Kane"	A. Hardy	4:55
2.	"Raw" (Remix)	A. Hardy	5:45
3.	"Set It Off"	A. Hardy	4:07
4.	"The Day You're Mine"	A. Hardy; A. Boothe	5:12
5.	"On the Bugged Tip" (featuring Scoob Lover)	A. Hardy	3:18
6.	"Ain't No Half-Steppin'"	A. Hardy	5:18
7.	"I'll Take You There"	A. Hardy	4:55
8.	"Just Rhymin' with Biz" (featuring Biz Markie)	A. Hardy	4:02
9.	"Mister Cee's Master Plan" (featuring Mister Cee)	A. Hardy	5:24
10.	"Word to the Mother (Land)"	A. Hardy	3:09
Total length:			46:40

== Charts ==
=== Weekly charts ===
Chart (1988)	Peak position
US Billboard 200	116
US Top R&B/Hip-Hop Albums (Billboard)	5

=== Year-end charts ===
Chart (1988)	Position
US Top R&B/Hip-Hop Albums (Billboard)	41
Chart (1989)	Position
US Top R&B/Hip-Hop Albums (Billboard)	81

== Certifications ==
Region	Certification	Certified units/sales
United States (RIAA)	Gold	500,000^{^}
^{^} Shipments figures based on certification alone.
