= Mister Cee =

American record executive (1966–2024)

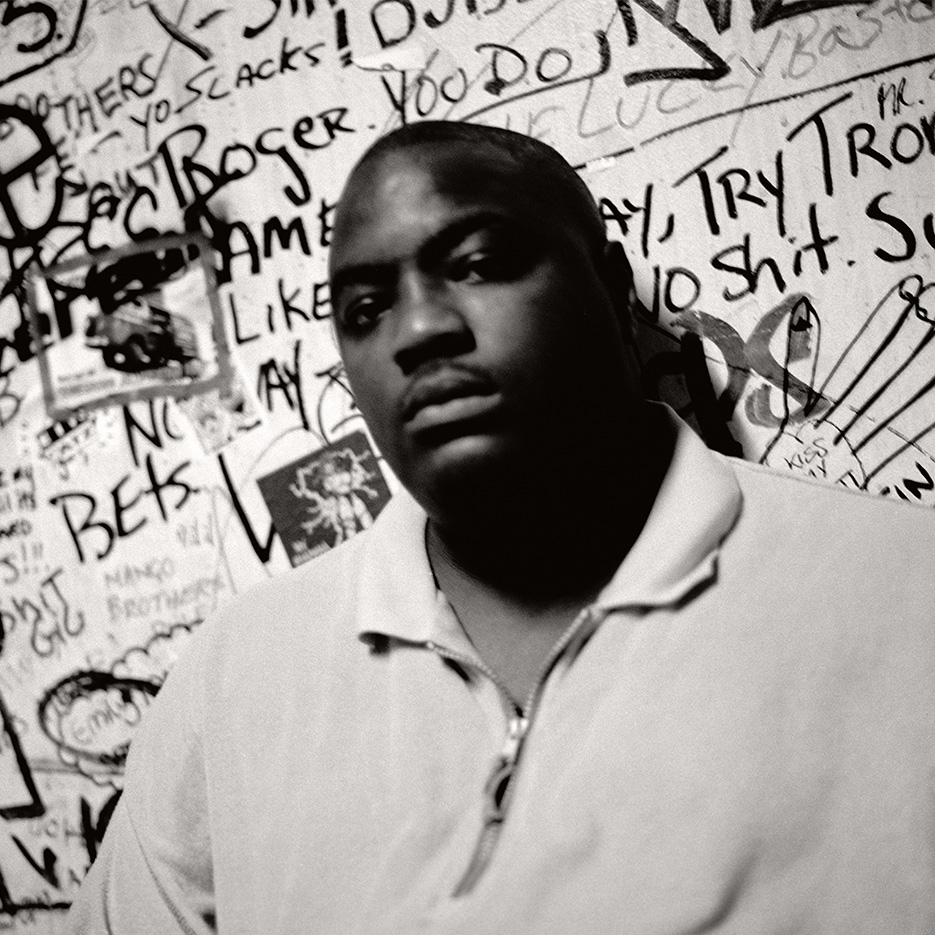
- Mister Cee in 1997

Background information
- Also known as: The Finisher; The Wallop King; DJ Mister Cee
- Born: Calvin LeBrun; August 17, 1966; Bedford–Stuyvesant, Brooklyn, New York City, U.S.
- Died: April 10, 2024 (aged 57) New York City, U.S.
- Genre: Hip-hop
- Occupations: Disc jockey; radio personality; broadcaster
- Years active: 1987–2024
- Formerly of: The Flip Squad; Juice Crew

Calvin LeBrun (August 17, 1966 – April 10, 2024), known professionally as Mister Cee, was an American disc jockey, broadcaster, and radio personality from Bedford–Stuyvesant, Brooklyn, New York City. A member of The Flip Squad and the Juice Crew, he appeared on the track "Mister Cee's Master Plan" from Big Daddy Kane's debut album, Long Live the Kane (1988). He also helped discover the Notorious B.I.G. and served as the associate executive producer of his debut album, Ready to Die (1994).

== Biography ==
Calvin LeBrun was born on August 17, 1966, in Bedford–Stuyvesant, Brooklyn, New York City. At a young age, he learned how to DJ from the DJ Knight crew and the Knights of Hollywood. In high school, he met rapper Big Daddy Kane and, after graduation, worked for several messenger companies, including Airborne Express, until he began deejaying for Kane in the late 1980s. He appeared on the track "Mister Cee's Master Plan" from Kane's debut album, Long Live the Kane (1988), and was a member of the Juice Crew, alongside rapper Roxanne Shante.

In the early 1990s, he gained popularity as a radio DJ, showcasing rising artists' music. His radio shows Throwback at Noon and Friday Night Live aired on New York radio stations Hot 97 and WBLS, respectively. During this time, LeBrun helped discover the Notorious B.I.G., otherwise known as Biggie Smalls, after meeting the rapper through his DJ 50 Grand. He would help record B.I.G.'s demo and facilitate the deal that got the Notorious B.I.G. signed by Sean "Diddy" Combs to Bad Boy Records.

In 1998, LeBrun became a member of The Flip Squad, which included Mark Ronson. He influenced Alicia Keys and was referenced in Jay-Z's 2009 single "D.O.A. (Death of Auto-Tune)". He was one of the first DJs to play Fetty Wap's "Trap Queen" in 2014, helping launch the rapper's career. Aside from his contributions to music, LeBrun also helped develop a new flavor called "Island Punch Finisher" for Tropical Fantasy soft drinks. In 2008, the video game Grand Theft Auto IV featured a Mister Cee character on a rap radio station titled "102.7, the Beat".

In 2013, his sexuality entered the public debate after being repeatedly arrested for soliciting prostitution from trans women. Challenged by his radio co-host Ebro Darden, he was secretive and denied being gay. He eventually publicly acknowledged that, while not seeking sex with trans women, he had sought oral sex and questioned his sexuality. As a result of the controversy and the station's new plans for music, he resigned from Hot 97 temporarily in 2013 and permanently in 2014, moving to his show on WXBK. Despite the prevalence of homophobia in the hip-hop community, he received support from many notable hip-hop figures, including Questlove. Addressing the incident in 2021 on a podcast hosted by Maino, LeBrun said that being outed made him feel dead and likened the experience to a funeral, stating that in his mind "a whole funeral scene unfolded: who came and didn't come, who was mourning, who was laughing from the back of the pews". In the same interview, he identified himself as a "try-sexual", meaning that he was "willing to try anything", and affirmed that he was attracted to trans women.

In 2020, LeBrun hosted SiriusXM's "The Set It Off Show" on LL Cool J's Rock the Bells Radio, a position he held until his death. LeBrun died in New York City on April 10, 2024, at the age of 57 due to "diabetes-related coronary artery/kidney disease". LeBrun's cause of death was confirmed in an official statement from his family. Numerous recording artists and broadcasters expressed their condolences on social media, including 50 Cent, Faith Evans, Queen Latifah, Fat Joe, DJ Premier, Pete Rock, Chuck D, Busta Rhymes, Raekwon, Ed Lover, Memphis Bleek, MC Lyte, Big Daddy Kane, DJ Jazzy Jeff, journalist Elliott Wilson, and Hot 97 DJ Peter Rosenberg.

== Discography ==
- Big Daddy Kane – It's a Big Daddy Thing (1989), producer
- Masta Ace – Take a Look Around (1990), producer
- Big Daddy Kane – Taste of Chocolate (1990), producer
- Big Daddy Kane – Prince of Darkness (1991), producer
- Roxanne Shante – The Bitch Is Back (1992), producer
- Big Daddy Kane – Looks Like a Job For... (1993), producer
- The Notorious B.I.G. – Ready to Die (1994), associate executive producer
- Kool G Rap & DJ Polo – Rated XXX (1996), remixing
- Leschea – Rhythm and Beats (1996), producer
- Diamond D – Hatred, Passions and Infidelity (1997), executive producer
- The Diplomats – More Than Music Vol. 1 (2005), vocals
- The Notorious B.I.G. – Duets: The Final Chapter (2005), associate executive producer
- Peanut Butter Wolf – 45 Live (2009), scratching
