= Cameo Afro =

Song by Big Daddy Kane, GZA and Suga Bang Bang

from the album The RZA Presents: Afro Samurai The Soundtrack
- Released: 2007
- Genre: East Coast hip hop
- Length: 2:59
- Label: Koch Records
- Songwriter(s): Antonio Hardy; Gary E. Grice; B. Elliot
- Producer(s): RZA

"Cameo Afro" is a song written and performed by American rappers Big Daddy Kane, GZA and Suga Bang Bang from 2007 soundtrack to animated television series Afro Samurai. It was produced by the RZA and mixed by Charlie Watts.

It is the first time that Big Daddy Kane and GZA have worked in the same studio after they were members of Cold Chillin' Records, during which time GZA was rumored to be a ghostwriter for Kane, and it is hailed as a historical collaboration.
