= Stone Mecca =

- Also known as: James "Tre" Rabb; Tru James
- Origin: Inglewood, California, United States
- Genres: Hip hop; R&B; soul; funk; funk rock; psychedelic rock; blues rock
- Occupations: Musician, singer, songwriter, record producer, recording engineer, recording mixer
- Instruments: Guitar, bass, guitar, keyboards, vocals
- Years active: 1996–present
- Label: Touch the Music Records
- Website: stonemeccamusic.com

Stone Mecca, also known as Tru James and James "Tre" Rabb, is an American multi-genre instrumentalist, singer/songwriter, producer, recording engineer, and mixer. A longtime collaborator with Wu-Tang Clan founder RZA, Stone Mecca has worked on many projects with RZA, including studio albums, soundtracks, and concerts.

== Musical career ==
Stone Mecca is a self-taught musician from Inglewood, California, who started playing drums at age nine, then learned to play the guitar and bass as a teenager.

He began his career as a session musician, often playing guitar and keyboards, appearing on several records by hip-hop artists on Priority Records, Ruthless Records, and Ice Cube’s Lench Mob Records. Notable records he contributed to include Mack 10's Mack 10 Based on a True Story, Snoop Dogg's No Limit Top Dogg, Eazy-E's Str8 off tha Streetz of Muthaphukkin Compton, MC Ren's Ruthless for Life, Ant Banks Presents T.W.D.Y.'s Derty Werk, and NFL Jams.

Marking the beginning of his long-time affiliation with RZA, Stone Mecca appeared on the Wu-Tang Clan's fifth studio album 8 Diagrams in 2007, performing on the album's first single "My Heart Gently Weeps", which featured Erykah Badu and Red Hot Chili Peppers guitarist John Frusciante. He and his band also served as the backing band for the Wu-Tang Clan at Rock the Bells in San Francisco later that same year.

He appeared on several songs on the RZA as Bobby Digital album Digi Snacks. In addition, Stone Mecca's band was the opening act and RZA's backing band on the RZA as Bobby Digital Digi Snacks Tour in 2008.

Stone Mecca produced and released his first album First Contact in 2008, which featured Soul/R&B songs with performances by various artists. One of the songs from this album "The Walk", performed by Allen Anthony (formerly of the group Christión), appeared on the Afro Samurai soundtrack, along with another song produced by Stone Mecca "Oh".

In 2009, Stone Mecca and band members appeared uncredited on Wu-Tang Clan member Raekwon's fourth studio album, Only Built 4 Cuban Linx... Pt. II.

In 2010, Stone Mecca was also featured in two songs on the second soundtrack installment of the Afro Samurai series RZA Presents: Afro Samurai Resurrection soundtrack - "Blood Thicker Than Mud - Family Affair" with Sly Stone and Reverend Burke, and "Girl Samurai Lullaby" with Rah Digga. In addition, Stone Mecca, who is listed as Tru James (James Rabb) in the liner notes, is credited as an engineer and co-mixer on the majority of the tracks.

In 2012, RZA shared an alternate version of The Man with the Iron Fists Soundtrack song "White Dress" by Kanye West, which was produced and mixed by Stone Mecca. That same year, Stone Mecca collaborated with RZA sharing production, arranging, and performing credits on the Django Unchained OST song "Ode to Django (The D is Silent).

In 2014, he worked in the studio again with the Wu-Tang Clan, both engineering and playing guitar on several tracks on their 20th anniversary and sixth studio album, Wu-Tang Clan - A Better Tomorrow.

Continuing his working relationship with RZA in 2016, Stone Mecca worked as an engineer on the RZA and Paul Banks (Interpol) project Banks & Steelz.

Stone Mecca released his third self-produced album Alienman on November 9, 2018. The video for album’s first single, “If Experience Was Money”, was featured on Afropunk. Billboard premiered his second single “Boogeyman”. The ten-track album is a definitive departure from his previous hip-hop and R&B works and collaborations. On his latest guitar-heavy solo effort - in which he plays all the instruments and sings lead vocals on each track - Stone Mecca blends the genres of psychedelic rock, funk, and blues together. In an interview with the Dallas Observer, Stone Mecca stated, “This is really about who I am fully and completely. When I first started making music and taught myself how to play guitar, the kind of stuff I was doing was more so what you hear on Alienman than the other stuff that I might have been known for. It’s just about me going back to my roots, wanting to play guitar and have fun with it.”

== Stage name ==
He explained his stage name in an interview with Ibanez: “Stone Mecca was an idea I had, and I wanted to bring a movement together of people that was true to music… I also wanted to have the hypnotic effect and hard hitting beats of today's music and hip-hop… the ‘Stone’ is because it's solid. ‘Mecca’ is like the coming home or the place where you go to ground yourself again. So you put them both together and you've got a solid home. That's what the whole concept of Stone Mecca is and where it came from."

== Works ==
- First Contact (Touch the Music Records, 2007)
- Live on 54th (Touch the Music Records, 2010)
- Alienman (Touch the Music Records, 2018)
