= The RZA Presents: Afro Samurai Resurrection OST =

The RZA Presents: Afro Samurai Resurrection The Soundtrack

Soundtrack album by RZA
- Released: January 27, 2009
- Recorded: 2008
- Studio: 36 West (North Hollywood, CA); Remedy Studio; TechnoVoice; Legend The Convent Recording Studio
- Genre: Hip-hop; soul
- Length: 59:58
- Label: Wu; Koch
- Producer: Mitchell "Divine" Diggs (exec.); RZA (also exec.)

RZA chronology
The RZA Presents: Afro Samurai The Soundtrack (2007)	The RZA Presents: Afro Samurai Resurrection The Soundtrack (2009)	The Man With The Iron Fists (Original Motion Picture Soundtrack) (2012)

Singles from Afro Samurai Resurrection
- 1. "You Already Know" Released: December 16, 2008

Professional ratings
Review scores
Source	Rating
AllMusic	3/5 stars
HipHopDX	3/5
Pitchfork	4.2/10
RapReviews	7/10
Spectrum Culture	3/5
Tiny Mix Tapes	4.5/5 stars

The RZA Presents: Afro Samurai Resurrection The Soundtrack is the soundtrack to 2009 anime television film Afro Samurai: Resurrection. It was released on January 27, 2009, via Wu Music Group/Koch Records, serving as a sequel to RZA's 2007 Afro Samurai The Soundtrack. Recording sessions mostly took place at 36 West in North Hollywood. Produced entirely by RZA, the album features contributions from Kool G Rap, Rah Digga, Shavo Odadjian, Sly Stone, and Wu-Tang Clan members and affiliates.

== Track listing ==
All music is composed by Robert Fitzgerald Diggs.

No.	Title	Writer(s)	Length
1.	"Combat (Afro Season II Open Theme)" (with P.Dot)	R. Diggs; N. Greenaway	2:50
2.	"You Already Know" (with Kool G Rap, Inspectah Deck and Suga Bang Bang)	N. Wilson; J. Hunter; R. Diggs	2:48
3.	"Blood Thicker Than Mud "Family Affair"" (with Reverend William Burke, Sly Stone and Stone Mecca)	R. Diggs; W. Hudson; S. Stewart	3:33
4.	"Whar" (with Kool G Rap, Ghostface Killah and Tash Mahogany)	N. Wilson; D. Coles; Tash Mahogany; R. Diggs	4:25
5.	"Girl Samurai Lullaby" (with Rah Digga and Stone Mecca)	R. Fisher; R. Diggs	3:21
6.	"Fight for You" (with Thea Van Seijen)	T. Van Seijen; R. Diggs	2:01
7.	"Bitch Gonna Get Ya" (with Rah Digga)	R. Fisher; R. Diggs	3:37
8.	"Bloody Days Bloody Nights" (with Prodigal Sunn and Thea Van Seijen)	L. Ruff; T. Van Seijen; R. Diggs	1:47
9.	"Kill Kill Kill" (with Rugged Monk)	D. Rose; R. Diggs	2:44
10.	"Nappy Afro" (with Young Dirty Bastard)	R. Diggs; B. Jones	3:36
11.	"Bloody Samurai" (with Black Knights, Dexter Wiggles and Thea Van Seijen)	D. Rose; Q. Bennett; C. Woods; T. Van Seijen; R. Diggs	3:34
12.	"Dead Birds" (with Killah Priest, Prodigal Sunn and Shavo Odadjian)	W. Reed; L. Ruff; S. Odadjian; R. Diggs	2:22
13.	"Arch Nemesis" (with Ace and MoeRoc)	D. Shabazz; M. Clayton; R. Diggs	2:48
14.	"Brother's Keeper" (with Reverend William Burke & Infinite)	W. Hudson; R. Diggs; L. Diggs	3:42
15.	"Yellow Jackets" (with Ace and MoeRoc)	D. Shabazz; M. Clayton; R. Diggs	3:04
16.	"Take the Sword Pt. III" (with 60 Second Assassin, Leggezin, Crisis, Christ Bearer, Rugged Monk, Tré Irie, Beretta 9 and Reverend William Burke)	F. Cuffie; O. Ferreira; Q. Bennett; A. Johnson; D. Rose; A. Maraet; W. Hudson; S. Murray; R. Diggs	10:50
17.	"Number One Samurai (Afro Season II Outro)" (with 9th Prince)	R. Diggs; T. Hamlin	2:56
Total length:			59:58
