= Ebro in the Morning =

US radio program

- From left to right; Peter Rosenberg, Ebro Darden, and Laura Stylez
- Genre: Talk, Hip hop, Politics
- Running time: 4 hours
- Country of origin: United States
- Home station: Hot 97 (New York City)
- Starring: Ebro Darden; Peter Rosenberg; Laura Stylez
- Produced by: Jason Griffin
- Original release: 2012 (at WQHT-FM) – December 12, 2025

Ebro in the Morning was an American radio show based in New York City hosted by Ebro Darden, Peter Rosenberg, and Laura Stylez. It aired from 6 to 10 am. Common topics of discussion on the show include national news, politics, and celebrity gossip.

== History ==
Ebro in the Morning was established in 2012, when the then Programming Director, Ebro Darden rejoined the Hot 97 morning show. Ebro formerly worked alongside several past Hot 97 morning show co-hosts from 2004 to 2007, before rejoining the team in 2012. Since joining the show, Ebro has caused controversy on multiple occasions, due to statements he has made on the show. This includes his conflict with rapper 6ix9ine, and calling the Jersey City Public School District "trash".

The show aired its last show on December 12, 2025. The show was replaced by Hot 97 Mornings with Mero, hosted by The Kid Mero.

== Syndication ==
In September 2020, Ebro in the Morning with Laura Stylez and Rosenberg entered into national syndication via Superadio Networks.

On November 16, 2020, Alpha Media included Ebro in the Morning under its syndicated "WE" branded stations, which made the show available in Amarillo, Portland, and San Antonio

Ebro in the Morning also broadcasts on several "Loud" branded stations across the Lehigh Valley, Reading and State College in Pennsylvania; including WHOL/WEST, WRLD, and WRSC-FM-HD3.

== Segments ==
- Ride or Die
- Curved
- Flashing Lights
- Guru Talk
- Congratulations You Played Yourself
- Laura Never Loses
- 97 Minutes Commercial Free Hip Hop (occurred from 7:10 am to 8:47 am)
- White-ish Wednesdays
