= Laura Stylez =

American radio personality (born 1980)

- Born: Los Angeles, California, U.S.
- Presenting career
- Show: Ebro in the Morning (co-host)
- Stations: Hot 97; SiriusXM
- Style: Radio presenter
- Country: United States
- Website: laurastylez.com

Laura Stylez (born November 4) is an American radio personality. She hosts the Hot 97 morning show, Ebro in the Morning, alongside co-hosts Ebro Darden and Peter Rosenberg.

== Early life ==
Stylez was born and raised in Los Angeles, California. Her parents immigrated from Guatemala in the 1970s and as a result she grew up speaking both Spanish and English.

The last name "Stylez" was given to her by her friends who often complimented her on her daring style choices when she was younger.

== Career ==
Stylez got her first experience working in radio during a brief stint at a Los Angeles radio station. She moved to New York at the age of 19 to pursue a career as a radio personality. While attending college Stylez worked three jobs and started interning at local radio stations to learn about the radio industry.

Stylez' first professional on-air role in radio was at the Spanish-language station La Calle 105.9, playing mostly reggaeton music. Stylez also went on work at the urban radio station Power 105.1.

She moved to WQHT (Hot 97) as a digital producer and started working under Angie Martinez helping in digital aspects of her show. In 2013, after being asked to fill in on the Hot 97 morning show, she joined the show full time alongside Ebro, Rosenberg, and Cipha Sounds. She served as a co-host of Ebro in the Morning until the show's end on December 12, 2025. Stylez has hosted various shows including Caliente: Latin hits show on Sirius/XM Radio.

She is a co-founder of ENVSN Festival, a young women's empowerment festival.

== Filmography ==
Year	Title	Role	Notes
2014	This is Hot 97	Herself	main cast
