= How U Get a Record Deal? =

Single by Big Daddy Kane

from the album Looks Like a Job For...
- B-side: "Here Comes Kane, Scoob and Scrap"
- Released: April 15, 1993
- Recorded: 1992
- Genre: Hip hop
- Length: 3:56
- Label: Cold Chillin' / Warner Bros.
- Songwriter: Antonio Hardy
- Producer: Trackmasters

Big Daddy Kane singles chronology
"The Lover in You" (1992)	"How U Get a Record Deal?" (1993)	"Very Special" (1993)

"How U Get a Record Deal?" is the lead single released from Big Daddy Kane's fifth studio album, Looks Like a Job For.... The song is notable for being one of the first singles to be produced by the popular production duo, the Trackmasters.

Though the song did not reach the crossover success that its follow-up, "Very Special", achieved, it became his sixth top ten hit on the Billboard Hot Rap Singles chart, peaking at number seven.

== Single track listing ==
=== A-Side ===
1. "How U Get a Record Deal?" (Album Version) – 3:56
2. "How U Get a Record Deal?" (Clean Radio Edit) – 3:56
3. "How U Get a Record Deal?" (A cappella) – 3:19

=== B-Side ===
1. "Here Comes Kane, Scoob and Scrap" (Album Version) – 4:24
2. "Here Comes Kane, Scoob and Scrap" (Instrumental) – 4:23
3. "How U Get a Record Deal?" (Instrumental) – 3:56

== Chart history ==
Chart (1993)	Peak position
Billboard Hot R&B Singles	86
Billboard Hot Rap Singles	7
Billboard Hot Dance Music/Maxi-Singles Sales	22
