= Arts and Entertainment (album) =

Arts & Entertainment

Studio album by Masta Ace and Ed O.G.
- Released: October 6, 2009
- Recorded: 2008–09
- Studio: Dojo II Studios (New York, NY); Nelly Protoolz
- Genre: Hip hop
- Length: 50:51
- Label: M3 Records
- Producer: Baby Dooks; DJ Spinna; DJ Supreme One; Double-O; Frank Dukes; M-Phazes; Pav Bundy; Rain

Masta Ace chronology
The Show (2008)	Arts & Entertainment (2009)	MA DOOM: Son of Yvonne (2012)

Ed O.G. chronology
Acting (2008)	Arts & Entertainment (2009)	Face In The Crowd (2011)

Professional ratings
Review scores
Source	Rating
AllMusic	4/5 stars
HipHopDX	3/5
RapReviews	8/10
XXL	3/5 (L)

Arts & Entertainment is a collaborative studio album by American rappers Masta Ace and Edo G. It was released on October 6, 2009 via M3 Records. Recording sessions took place at Dojo II Studios in New York City and at Nelly Protoolz. Production was handled by DJ Supreme One, M-Phazes, Baby Dooks, DJ Spinna, Double-O, Frank Dukes, Pav Bundy and Rain. It features guest appearances from The Bundies, Chester French, DoItAll of Lords of the Underground, KRS-One, Large Professor, Marsha Ambrosius, Posdnuos and Lite. The album was met with generally favorable reviews from music critics.

== Track listing ==
No.	Title	Producer(s)	Length
1.	"T.V. Night"		0:47
2.	"Hands High" (featuring Jamelle Bundy)	M-Phazes	3:41
3.	"Fans" (featuring Large Professor)	DJ Supreme One	4:16
4.	"A's & E's (This What We Do)" (featuring Marsha Ambrosius)	Baby Dooks	4:00
5.	"Rocsi"		0:36
6.	"Little Young"	M-Phazes	3:07
7.	"Reminds Me"	DJ Supreme One	2:40
8.	"Black Ice Interlude"		0:39
9.	"Good Music" (featuring Posdnuos, Light and Jamelle Bundy)	DJ Spinna	4:02
10.	"Power Out"		0:38
11.	"Pass Da Mic" (featuring KRS-One)	Double-O	3:13
12.	"Over There"	M-Phazes	3:12
13.	"Round and Round" (featuring DoItAll)	DJ Supreme One	3:31
14.	"Hot Wangs"		0:45
15.	"Ei8ht Is Enuff"	Frank Dukes	3:11
16.	"Here I Go Again" (featuring Jamelle Bundy)	Rain	3:17
17.	"You Me & Some Snacks"		0:34
18.	"Dancin' Like a White Girl" (featuring Chester French and Pav Bundy)	Pav Bundy	5:17
19.	Untitled		3:25
Total length:			50:51

== Personnel ==
- Duval "Masta Ace" Clear – vocals, mixing
- Edward "Ed O.G." Anderson – vocals
- Tara "Jamelle Bundy" Jones – additional vocals (tracks: 2, 9), vocals (track 16)
- William "Large Professor" Mitchell – vocals (track 3)
- Marsha Ambrosius – vocals (track 4)
- Kelvin "Posdnuos" Mercer – vocals (track 9)
- Light/Lite – additional vocals (track 9)
- Lawrence "KRS-One" Parker – vocals (track 11)
- Dupré "DoItAll" Kelly – vocals (track 13)
- Chester French – vocals (track 18)
- Paris "Pav Bundy" Wells – vocals & producer (track 18)
- Mark "M-Phazes" Landon – producer (tracks: 2, 6, 12)
- Serge "DJ Supreme One" Aronov – producer (tracks: 3, 7, 13), scratches (track 11)
- David "Baby Dooks" Vurdelja – producer (track 4)
- Vincent "DJ Spinna" Williams – producer (track 9)
- Michael "Double-O" Aguilar – producer (track 11)
- Adam "Frank Dukes" Feeney – producer (track 15)
- RJ "Rain" Rixey – producer (track 16)
- Filthy Rich – recording, mixing
- Rick Essig – mastering
- Robert Alphonse – art direction
- A. Garcia – photography
