= Natalie Amrossi =

American photographer

- Born: Queens, New York City, U.S.
- Education: Stony Brook University
- Occupation: Photographer
- Years active: 2014 –
- Known for: Aerial photography, fine-art photography
- Website: misshattan.com

Natalie Amrossi, known online as @MISSHATTAN, is an aerial photographer.

== Early life and career ==
Amrossi was born Queens and raised in Jamaica Estates and Hillside, Queens. She graduated from Stony Brook University. She worked as an executive assistant at JP Morgan before leaving her job to focus on photography full-time.

She has regularly appeared in lists of the best photographers to follow and has appeared in media such as the New York Post, Today, Forbes, Entrepreneur, and several others.

She is currently serving as a creative ambassador for Canon. She has previously served as creative ambassador for Cadillac and Heineken.

== Personal life ==
Amrossi is married to Peter Rosenberg, a talk show and professional wrestling host.
