= Afro Samurai: The Album =

The RZA Presents: Afro Samurai The Soundtrack

Soundtrack album by RZA
- Released: January 30, 2007
- Recorded: 2006
- Genre: Hip-hop; soul
- Length: 1:01:46
- Label: Koch Records
- Producer: RZA (also exec.); Stone Mecca; J-Love; M1

RZA chronology
Music from the Motion Picture Ghost Dog: The Way Of The Samurai (1999)	The RZA Presents: Afro Samurai The Soundtrack (2007)	The RZA Presents: Afro Samurai Resurrection The Soundtrack (2009)

Professional ratings
Review scores
Source	Rating
AllMusic	3.5/5 stars
HipHopDX	4.5/5
Pitchfork	6.6/10
The A.V. Club	B−

The RZA Presents: Afro Samurai The Soundtrack is the film score album by American rapper and producer RZA. It was released on January 30, 2007 via Koch Records, as the soundtrack to animated television series Afro Samurai. Production was primarily handled by RZA, with Stone Mecca, J-Love and M1. It features contributions from Big Daddy Kane, Talib Kweli, Q-Tip and Wu-Tang Clan members and affiliates.

Featuring the historic collaboration between Big Daddy Kane and GZA – "Cameo Afro", this album received great and positive reviews from many websites and magazines.

On February 1, 2007 RZA was interviewed on the Late Show on CBS and performed the song "Fury in My Eyes/Revenge" featuring Thea Van Seijen.

== Track listing ==
Track listing information is adapted from the liner notes, AllMusic and Discogs.

Afro Samurai: The Soundtrack
No.	Title	Writer(s)	Producer(s)	Length
1.	"Afro Theme"	R. Diggs	RZA	0:29
2.	"Afro Intro" (Instrumental)	R. Diggs	RZA	0:50
3.	"Certified Samurai" (with Talib Kweli, Free Murder and Suga Bang Bang)	T. Greene; F. Drayton; B. Elliot	RZA	3:00
4.	"Just A Lil Dude "Who Dat Ovah There"" (with Q-Tip and Free Murder)	K. Fareed; F. Drayton; R. Diggs	RZA	3:28
5.	"Afro's Father Fight" (Instrumental)	R. Diggs	RZA	1:23
6.	"Oh" (Stone Mecca)	J. Rabb; A. Richardson	Stone Mecca	4:05
7.	"The Walk" (Stone Mecca)	J. Rabb; A. Richardson	Stone Mecca	4:09
8.	"Bazooka Fight I" (Instrumental)	R. Diggs	RZA	0:41
9.	"Who Is Tha Man" (with Reverend William Burke)	W. Hudson; R. Diggs	RZA	2:33
10.	"Ninjaman" (Instrumental)	R. Diggs	RZA	2:08
11.	"Cameo Afro" (with Big Daddy Kane, GZA and Suga Bang Bang)	A. Hardy; G. Grice; B. Elliot; R. Diggs	RZA	2:52
12.	"Tears Of A Samurai" (Instrumental)	R. Diggs	RZA	1:28
13.	"Take Sword Pt. I" (with Beretta 9)	R. Diggs; S. Murray	RZA	2:47
14.	"The Empty 7 Theme" (Instrumental)	R. Diggs	RZA	3:17
15.	"Baby" (with Maurice)	M. Rabstatt; M. Baiardi; M. Bell	M1	3:40
16.	"Take Sword Pt. II" (with 60 Second Assassin and True Master)	F. Cuffie; D. Harris; R. Diggs	RZA	4:03
17.	"Bazooka Fight II" (Instrumental)	R. Diggs	RZA	0:45
18.	"Fury In My Eyes/Revenge" (with Thea Van Seijen)	R. Diggs	RZA	3:56
19.	"Afro Samurai Theme (First Movement)" (Instrumental)	R. Diggs	RZA	1:42
20.	"Afro Samurai Theme (Second Movement)" (Instrumental)	R. Diggs	RZA	1:36
21.	"Insomnia" (with J-Love)	R. Diggs; J. Elias	J-Love; RZA (co.)	3:22
22.	"So Fly" (with C.C.F. Division)	R. Diggs	RZA	2:55
23.	"We All We Got" (with Black Knights)	R. Diggs	RZA	1:47
24.	"Glorious Day" (with Dexter Wiggles)	R. Diggs	RZA	3:34
25.	"Series Outro" (Instrumental)	R. Diggs	RZA	1:16
Total length:				1:01:46

Notes

- Songs 21–24 are listed as Bobby Digital bonus tracks.
- The album contains various dialogue excerpts from the first season of the Afro Samurai anime.
