= It's a Big Daddy Thing =

Album by Big Daddy Kane

Studio album by Big Daddy Kane
- Released: September 19, 1989
- Recorded: 1989
- Genre: Hip hop
- Length: 76:32
- Labels: Cold Chillin'; Warner Bros.
- Producers: Big Daddy Kane; Marley Marl; Mister Cee; Prince Paul; Easy Mo Bee; Teddy Riley

Big Daddy Kane chronology
Long Live the Kane (1988)	It's a Big Daddy Thing (1989)	Taste of Chocolate (1990)

Singles from It's a Big Daddy Thing
- 1. "Smooth Operator" Released: August 3, 1989; 2. "I Get the Job Done" Released: December 23, 1989

Professional ratings
Review scores
Source	Rating
AllMusic	4.5/5 stars
Robert Christgau	B
Rolling Stone	4/5 stars

It's a Big Daddy Thing is the second full-length album by American rapper Big Daddy Kane. It was released on September 19, 1989, by Cold Chillin' Records and Warner Bros. Records.

== Background ==
Unlike his debut album, which was solely produced by Marley Marl, Kane himself produced the majority of the album. Production was also provided by Prince Paul, Easy Mo Bee, Teddy Riley, Mister Cee, as well as Marley Marl. In character with his first album and many other albums of the day, It's a Big Daddy Thing branches out into different styles, from battle rhymes to love ballads and more. His later posturing as a self-proclaimed ladies' man is somewhat foreshadowed by the hit song "Smooth Operator".

Even though "Wrath of Kane" had already been recorded & released on the "I'll Take You There" single, a decision was made to include a live performance taken from the Apollo Theater.

To date, it is his most successful effort commercially, certified gold by RIAA.

== Legacy ==
In 1998, the album was selected as one of The Source's 100 Best Rap Albums.

In 2008, the single "I Get the Job Done" was ranked number 57 on VH1's 100 Greatest Songs of Hip Hop.

== Track listing ==
No.	Title	Producer(s)	Length
1.	"It's a Big Daddy Thing"	Prince Paul	3:23
2.	"Another Victory"	Easy Mo Bee	4:53
3.	"Mortal Combat"	Big Daddy Kane	5:24
4.	"Children R the Future"	Big Daddy Kane	4:00
5.	"Young, Gifted and Black"	Marley Marl	3:13
6.	"Smooth Operator"	Big Daddy Kane	4:44
7.	"Calling Mr. Welfare" (featuring DJ Red Alert)	Easy Mo Bee	4:25
8.	"Wrath of Kane" (Live)	Marley Marl	5:00
9.	"I Get the Job Done"	Teddy Riley	5:30
10.	"Ain't No Stoppin' Us Now"	Prince Paul	3:20
11.	"Pimpin' Ain't Easy" (featuring Nice & Smooth, Scoob Lover and Ant Live)	Big Daddy Kane	4:10
12.	"Big Daddy's Theme"	Big Daddy Kane	2:08
13.	"To Be Your Man" (featuring Blue Magic and Chuck Stanley)	Big Daddy Kane	5:45
14.	"The House That Cee Built" (featuring Mister Cee)	Mister Cee	5:28
15.	"On the Move" (featuring Scoob Lover and Scrap Lover)	Big Daddy Kane	5:20
16.	"Warm It Up, Kane"	Big Daddy Kane	4:11
17.	"Rap Summary (Lean on Me)" (Remix)	Marley Marl	5:15
Total length:			1:16:32

Tracks 8 and 17 are omitted from the vinyl version.

== Charts ==
=== Weekly charts ===
Chart (1989)	Peak position
UK Albums (Official Charts)	37
US Billboard 200	33
US Top R&B/Hip-Hop Albums (Billboard)	4

=== Year-end charts ===
Chart (1990)	Position
US Top R&B/Hip-Hop Albums (Billboard)	36

=== Singles ===
Year	Single	Peak chart positions		
Year	Single	U.S. Dance	U.S. R&B	U.S. Rap
1989	"Smooth Operator"	17	11	1
1989	"I Get the Job Done"	—	27	9

== Certifications ==
Region	Certification	Certified units/sales
United States (RIAA)	Gold	500,000^{^}
^{^} Shipments figures based on certification alone.
