= Ain't No Half-Steppin' =

Single by Big Daddy Kane

from the album Long Live the Kane
- B-side: "Get Into It"
- Released: 1988
- Genre: Golden age hip hop
- Label: Cold Chillin'
- Songwriter(s): Antonio Hardy
- Producer(s): Marley Marl

Big Daddy Kane singles chronology
| "Ain't No Half-Steppin'" (1988) | "I'll Take You There" (1988) |

Music video
- "Ain't No Half-Steppin'" on YouTube

"Ain't No Half-Steppin'" is a 1988 hip-hop song written and performed by American rapper Big Daddy Kane. Released as a single from Kane's debut album Long Live the Kane, it peaked at No. 53 on the Billboard Hot Black Singles chart. The song samples "Ain't No Half Steppin'" by Heatwave, "UFO" by ESG, and "Blind Alley" by The Emotions.

In 2012, Rolling Stone ranked "Ain't No Half-Steppin'" No. 25 on its list of The 50 Greatest Hip-Hop Songs of All Time.

== Charts ==
| Chart (1988) | Peak position |
|---|---|
| US Billboard Hot Black Singles | 53 |
