= Peter Rosenberg =

American radio DJ

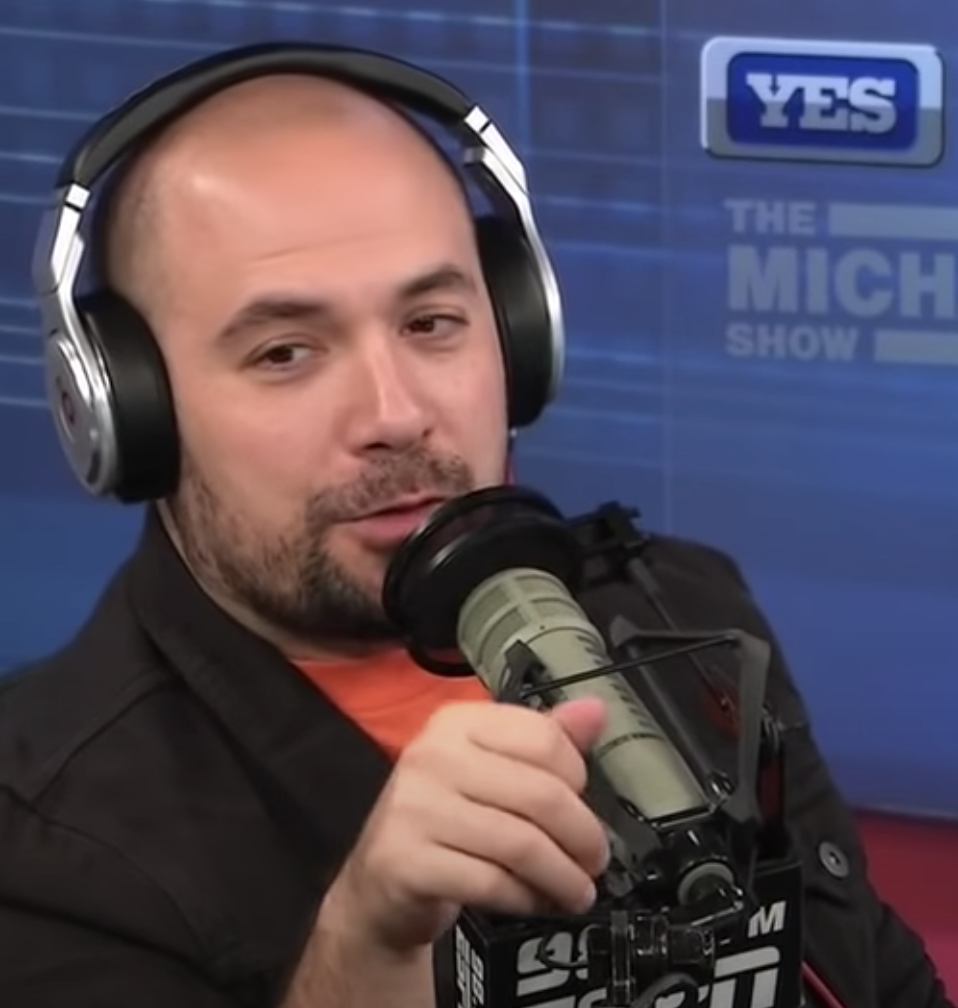
- Rosenberg on the YES Network, August 2018
- Born: Peter Elliot Rosenberg; July 23, 1979 (age 47); Chevy Chase, Maryland, U.S.
- Employer(s): Hot 97 (2007-present); ESPN (2016-present); WWE (2016–present)
- Family: M. J. Rosenberg (father)

Peter Elliot Rosenberg (born July 23, 1979) is an American radio personality, television show host, and professional wrestling panelist. He currently co-hosts Don, Hahn & Rosenberg with Don La Greca and Alan Hahn on ESPN New York and works as an on-air personality for WWE. Rosenberg previously co-hosted two New York City radio programs: Ebro in the Morning, the weekday morning show at hip hop radio station WQHT (Hot 97), and The Michael Kay Show with La Greca and Michael Kay until Kay left the afternoon time slot in 2024.

== Early life ==
Rosenberg was born in Chevy Chase, Maryland to M.J. Rosenberg, a Capitol Hill staffer father and public school teacher mother. He attended Bethesda-Chevy Chase High School in Bethesda, Maryland and grew up in Chevy Chase. He says his upbringing was "a very Jewish, upper middle class, regular suburban life." He was introduced to hip hop by his older brother, and has cited popular songs including "Parents Just Don't Understand" by DJ Jazzy Jeff & the Fresh Prince as early influences. Visiting his grandparents in Rockaway Beach in Queens, New York, he was influenced by radio shows hosted by DJ Red Alert and Marley Marl. He obtained his first set of turntables at the age of 14.

== Career ==
=== Radio ===
In the summer before his freshman year at the University of Maryland in College Park, Peter Rosenberg started hosting a late-night underground hip hop show, From Dusk 'Til Dawn, on campus radio station WMUC-FM. His initial DJ name was "PMD," an acronym for "Peter From Maryland" (a name given to him by Marley Marl while he won a contest on Marl's radio show). After graduating from college, Rosenberg performed as a DJ at a variety of radio stations in the DC area, including WPGC, WHFS and on talk radio at WJFK-FM. He began making online parody videos, which were seen by the soon-to-be program manager of New York's Hot 97 Ebro Darden, and that led to his 2007 hiring at the radio station.

Rosenberg co-hosted the weekday morning show, The Hot 97 Morning Show, on Hot 97 from 6 to 10 a.m. with Ebro Darden, Cipha Sounds, and Laura Stylez, and later Ebro in the Morning. They played contemporary hip hop and R&B tracks, interview musicians, and discuss music, relationships, sex and race in a straightforward style. He also hosted Real Late With Rosenberg on Sunday nights on Hot 97. Hot 97 is the most listened-to hip hop station in New York City and Rosenberg has said that he dreamed of being on the station as a child.

Rosenberg is known for supporting and introducing the public to up-and-coming New York rap artists. He was the first media personality to interview rapper Earl Sweatshirt after he returned in 2012 from a nearly two-year hiatus in Samoa. In an April 2014 New Yorker article on Rosenberg, he said, "Since I have a foot in both worlds, an artist can play me three tracks, and I can go, ‘This one only hip-hop heads like me will appreciate. This one could be big, but it’s corny. But this one could reach a lot of people, without you sacrificing who you are’".

After becoming mayor of New York City in 2014, Bill de Blasio's debut traditional Friday morning mayoral radio interview was by phone with Rosenberg and Ebro on The Hot 97 Morning Show. Rosenberg also hosts a number of podcasts including Bite the Mic with Mike Tyson. On March 6, 2020, it was announced Rosenberg had signed a deal with WWE to host their monthly pay per view panel shows, as well as other related projects.

Rosenberg's tenure at Hot 97 ended on December 12, 2025, along with the shows Real Late with Peter Rosenberg and Ebro in the Morning, of which he was a co-host.

Rosenberg became a co-host of the Michael Kay Show on ESPN New York in 2015 with Michael Kay and Don La Greca. After Michael Kay's departure from the afternoon time-slot in December 2024, he became the co-host of Don, Hahn, and Rosenberg with La Greca and Alan Hahn, airing from 3-7 PM EST on WHSQ.

=== Podcasts ===
Rosenberg and Cipha Sounds co-host the podcast Juan Ep Is Life (formerly Juan Epstein) which has featured Jay-Z, Eminem, Rick Ross, Pusha T, and other guests.

Rosenberg also hosts a professional wrestling themed podcast, Cheap Heat. Cheap Heat was produced by the Ringer from November 2021 to April 2024.

Along with Michelle Beadle, Rosenberg co-hosted the Over the Top podcast, produced by Wondery, from October 2023 to June 2024.

=== Professional wrestling ===
Since 2009, Rosenberg has hosted a YouTube series called Wrestling with Rosenberg where he has interviewed professional wrestlers including WWE Hall of Famers Hulk Hogan, Shawn Michaels, Mick Foley and Jesse Ventura. On December 19, 2009, Rosenberg served as a guest commentator for Ring of Honor's (ROH) Final Battle 2009 pay-per-view. He has appeared for Total Nonstop Action Wrestling (TNA).

In late 2013, he began co-hosting a podcast called Cheap Heat with Grantland wrestling journalist David Shoemaker. In February 2015, he appeared on WWE Hall of Famer Stone Cold Steve Austin's podcast. On December 4, 2016, Rosenberg made his first appearance as a panelist on the TLC: Tables, Ladders & Chairs pre-show. In January 2017, Rosenberg became the host of the WWE Network show, Bring it to the Table, alongside Paul Heyman and John "Bradshaw" Layfield, with Corey Graves replacing Heyman in later episodes.

Since 2017, Rosenberg has served as a panelist on numerous pay-per-view pre-shows as well as several Talking Smack and Raw Talk post-shows. On January 31, 2021, at the Royal Rumble, Rosenberg, who was serving as a pre-show panelist, pinned R-Truth to win the WWE 24/7 Championship. The next day, however, R-Truth snuck up on him live on The Michael Kay Show and pinned him to win back his title.

Rosenberg was announced as the play-by-play commentator for WWE Evolve in March 2025. The pre-taped show airs on Tubi and features up-and-coming wrestlers from the WWE Performance Center and the WWE Independent Development system competing in an attempt to be promoted to NXT.

=== TV/video ===
Rosenberg hosted Hip Hop Squares on MTV2 for both of its two seasons. The show aired from May 22, 2012, to December 18, 2012 and was based on the tic-tac-toe game show Hollywood Squares. It featured a rotating cast of rappers, DJ's, comedians, athletes, and TV personalities as the nine squares on the board.

Rosenberg is the host of Noisemakers, a hip hop interview series that began in 2008. Past guests include Nas, DJ Premier and Diddy. Interviews take place primarily at the 92nd Street Y in Manhattan. The series has been described as a hip hop version of Inside the Actors Studio.

In June 2013, Rosenberg began hosting a new original video series on Complex TV. On The Process, he interviews new and established hip hop artists about their songwriting approach. The first episode's guest was Raekwon. Other subjects include Prodigy, Schoolboy Q, Azealia Banks, Future, and Goodie Mob.

=== Concerts ===
Rosenberg throws an annual summer concert, Peterpalooza, in celebration of his birthday. The first one was at the Best Buy Theater in Manhattan in 2012, and featured performances from Odd Future, Raekwon, Asher Roth, Nitty Scott, and Smoke DZA. The second, at Williamsburg Park in Brooklyn in 2013, featured performances from Schoolboy Q, Meek Mill, Odd Future, Fabolous, and World's Fair.

=== Nicki Minaj controversy ===
After Rosenberg implied on the small stage at Hot 97's Summer Jam 2012 concert that Nicki Minaj's pop single "Starships" was not "real hip-hop", Minaj, the concert's scheduled headliner, withdrew from the concert. Rosenberg declined to apologize, clarifying that his comments were not meant as an attack on Minaj, and that she is "inherently hip-hop... it’s just that 'Starships' is definitely not." Minaj was replaced on the bill by Nas and Lauryn Hill.

On May 28, 2013, nearly a year after the dispute began, Minaj appeared as a guest on Rosenberg's Hot 97 morning show. The two made up, with Rosenberg apologizing and noting that he doesn't have anything against Minaj personally. Minaj said that she should not have canceled her performance, but was annoyed at the time due to her lack of familiarity with Rosenberg. A week after appearing on Hot 97, Minaj joined 2 Chainz at Summer Jam 2013, performing two songs with the rapper.

== Discography ==
Rosenberg has released two official mixtapes. The first was What's Poppin' Vol. 1 in 2011, more than half of the rappers on the tape were from New York. Artists include Action Bronson, The Kid Daytona, Skyzoo, Raekwon, Kendrick Lamar, Danny Brown, J. Cole, Odd Future, and Sugar Tongue Slim. In April 2013, he released his second official mixtape, The New York Renaissance, with new music from A$AP Rocky, A$AP Ferg, Joey Bada$$, Action Bronson, Flatbush Zombies, Troy Ave, Smoke DZA, and others. He voiced the intro for Rick Ross's 2012 mixtape The Black Bar Mitzvah. He also made an appearance on the track "Sincerely Yours" from Little Brother's sophomore album The Minstrel Show.

=== Compilation albums ===
- Real Late (2021)

=== Mixtapes ===
- What's Poppin' Vol. 1 (2011)
- The New York Renaissance (2013)

== Personal life ==
Rosenberg is Jewish and lives on the Upper West Side in Manhattan. Since 2020, he has been in a relationship with New York photographer Natalie Amrossi. He announced his engagement to Amrossi on the June 22, 2022 edition of The Michael Kay Show. They married in July 2023.

In regard to his affection for hip hop music, Rosenberg said in an April 2014 interview with The New Yorker: "I will go toe to toe with almost anyone in terms of knowledge, trivia, and love of this music."

He is not related to radio DJ Paul Rosenberg.

== Filmography ==
Television
Year	Title	Role	Notes
2008	Noisemakers	Himself	Host
2012	Hip Hop Squares	Himself	Guest
2013	The Process	Himself	Host
2014	This Is Hot 97	Himself	Main Cast
2017	Bring It to the Table	Himself	Co-host

== Championships and accomplishments ==
- WWE
  - WWE 24/7 Championship (1 time)

Media offices
Preceded by Tom Bergeron in the 1998-2004 version	Host of Hollywood Squares franchise Known as Hip Hop Squares in Rosenberg's version 2012	Succeeded by DeRay Davis; 2017 version
