= Looks Like a Job For... =

Studio album by Big Daddy Kane
- Released: May 25, 1993
- Recorded: 1992–1993
- Genre: Hip hop
- Length: 49:05
- Label: Cold Chillin’; Warner Bros.
- Producer: Big Daddy Kane; Trackmasters; DJ Clash; Robert Brown; Easy Mo Bee; Cool V; Large Professor; Mister Cee; Spark Boogie

Big Daddy Kane chronology
Prince of Darkness (1991)	Looks Like a Job For... (1993)	Daddy's Home (1994)

Professional ratings
Review scores
Source	Rating
AllMusic	4/5 stars
Entertainment Weekly	B
The New Rolling Stone Album Guide	3/5 stars
The Source	3.5/5 stars

Looks Like a Job For... is the fifth album by emcee Big Daddy Kane, released in 1993 on Cold Chillin' Records.

After the commercial failure of his 1991 album Prince of Darkness, Kane was able to reclaim his past status, with an album considered a return to his prior greatness. Unlike previous albums, Kane involved a large number of outside producers for the project including future production stars the Trackmasters, Easy Mo Bee, and Large Professor.

Looks Like a Job For... featured Kane's first Top 40 Billboard Hot 100 hit, "Very Special," as well as the underground hip-hop hit "How U Get a Record Deal?" and a remix of the track "’Nuff Respect," which was originally from the soundtrack of the film Juice.

Album guests include Kane's brother Little Daddy Shane, Kane's backup dancers Scoob & Scrap Lover, and Spinderella of Salt-N-Pepa.

== Track listing ==
No.	Title	Producer(s)	Length
1.	"Looks Like a Job for..."	Trackmasters	3:56
2.	"How U Get a Record Deal?"	Trackmasters	3:56
3.	"Chocolate City" (featuring Mister Cee, Scoob Lover, Scrap Lover and Lil Daddy Shane)	Trackmasters; DJ Clash; Robert Brown	3:01
4.	"Prelude"	Big Daddy Kane	0:55
5.	"The Beef Is On"	Big Daddy Kane	3:23
6.	"Stop Shammin'"	Easy Mo Bee	3:56
7.	"Brother Man, Brother Man" (featuring Lil Daddy Shane)	Cool V	3:06
8.	"Rest In Peace"	Easy Mo Bee	4:15
9.	"Very Special" (featuring Spinderella, Laree Williams and Karen Anderson)	Big Daddy Kane	5:03
10.	"Here Comes Kane, Scoob and Scrap" (featuring Scoob Lover and Scrap Lover)	Easy Mo Bee	4:24
11.	"Niggaz Never Learn"	Large Professor	3:06
12.	"Give It to Me"	Mister Cee; Spark Boogie	3:38
13.	"'Nuff Respect" (Remix)	Easy Mo Bee (original produced by Hank Shocklee, Gary G-Wiz)	3:15
14.	"Finale"	Big Daddy Kane	3:10

== Album singles ==
Single information
"How U Get a Record Deal?"
- Released: April 15, 1993
- B-Side: "Here Comes Kane, Scoob and Scrap"
"Very Special"
- Released: August 26, 1993
- B-Side: "Stop Shammin'"

== Charts ==
=== Weekly charts ===
Chart (1993)	Peak position
US Billboard 200	52
US Top R&B/Hip-Hop Albums (Billboard)	9

=== Year-end charts ===
Chart (1993)	Position
US Top R&B Albums (Billboard)	97

=== Singles ===
Year	Song	Chart positions				
Year	Song	Billboard Hot 100	Hot R&B Singles	Hot Rap Singles	Hot Dance Music/Maxi-Singles Sales	Rhythmic Top 40
1993	"How U Get a Record Deal?"	-	86	7	22	-
1993	"Very Special"	31	23	9	24	6
