= Frankie Cutlass =

American rapper and music producer

Background information
- Born: Frank Javiel Malave; January 16, 1971 (age 55); Manhattan, New York City, U.S.
- Genres: Hip hop; urban; dance; Latin
- Occupations: DJ; record producer; songwriter; remixer
- Years active: 1987–present
- Labels: CMG; Relativity; Violator; Sony; Epic; Tommy Boy
- Formerly of: The Flip Squad

Frank Javiel Malave (born January 16, 1971), better known by his stage name Frankie Cutlass, is an American Grammy nominated and award-winning DJ, platinum producer, songwriter, and remixer from East Harlem, New York City. He was a member of the Funkmaster Flex's DJ collective The Flip Squad.

== Early life ==
Frankie Cutlass was born and raised in New York City's Spanish Harlem (also known as El Barrio), to Puerto Rican parents Delia Rivera Malave, a housewife, and Firpo Malave from Cayey, Puerto Rico. The youngest of nine children, he was raised in the same housing development as actor and singer-songwriter Marc Anthony at Metro North Plaza Houses.

== Music career ==
It was Cutlass' brother who first inspired him to DJ, and Cutlass first used the decks in the 1980s at the age of 12. Shortly after, he started working as a DJ at local parties and clubs. Cutlass first hit the scene at the age of 15 and one year later left school to embrace a full-time music career. He soon moved into production as well, working with Freestyle music.

In 1994, Cutlass used his own label, Hoody Records, to produce The Frankie Cutlass Show, from which his classic Hip Hop single "Puerto Rico" charted on the Top Hot Dance Billboard chart at number 42. In 1995, Cutlass released his second single "Boriquas on the Set" featuring Fat Joe, Doo Wop and Ray Boogie as an underground hip hop hit and peaked at number 29 on Billboard Hot Rap Songs. It would lead him to a recording deal with Relativity Records, Violator Records and Epic Records.

By the mid-1990s, Cutlass became a member of the Funkmaster Flex team "The Flip Squad" and started spinning at special events, and on the airwaves for New York City's Hot 97 (WQHT) Radio Station. Frankie's interest had expanded into production as well as leading him to work with popular artists such as The Notorious B.I.G, Uncle Luke, Fat Joe, Shaggy, Rayvon, Akinyele, Mad Lion and veteran Latin Music artists such as Tito Nieves on his smash "I Like It Like That".

1997 saw the release of his second album, Politics & Bullshit, paying tribute to old-school rap and featuring artists such as Redman, Busta Rhymes, Mobb Deep, Fat Joe, Smif-n-Wessun, Sadat X, Biz Markie, Craig G, Kool G Rap, M.O.P., Keith Murray, Heltah Skeltah, the Lost Boyz, Roxanne Shanté and Big Daddy Kane. The album charted on Billboard 200 albums at number 129, Billboard Top R&B/Hip-Hop albums at number 32 and Billboard Heatseekers albums at number 4. The third single, "The Cypher, Pt. 3," reunited several veterans of Marley Marl Juice Crew All Stars artist, including Biz Markie, Roxanne Shanté, Big Daddy Kane, and Craig G charted at number 24 on the Billboard Hot Rap Songs.

His music found its way to mainstream success when "Freak It Out" by Doug E. Fresh was included in the 1996 soundtrack for the film Don't Be a Menace to South Central While Drinking Your Juice in the Hood, which was certified gold-selling.

"Puerto Rico" was featured in the film Gloria starring Sharon Stone and on Jennifer Lopez's 2003 DVD, Let's Get Loud. Fatboy Slim's "Ya Mama" was featured in the Charlie's Angels Part 1 soundtrack, and was certified double-platinum by the RIAA.

In 2001, Jennifer Lopez opens up her Let's Get Loud concert with Frankie Cutlass's song "Puerto Rico" at the Roberto Clemente Coliseum in Puerto Rico. This concert was also televised on NBC in 2002.

In 2006 Cutlass returned with a new remix of "Puerto Rico", featuring Joell Ortiz, Lumidee, The King of the Cuatro Yomo Toro, Julio Voltio and The Barrio Boys.

In June 2016 Cutlass scored another double platinum award plaque by collaborating with DJ Khaled on his single title "For Free" featuring Drake.

In 2017 DJ Khaled album Major Keys was nominated for a Grammy recognizing Frankie Cutlass as a co-producer and writer.

In 2020 the NFL and Jennifer Lopez licensed Cutlass song "Puerto Rico Hooo" to be played during the Super Bowl half time show.

On June 8, 2022 Netflix invited Frankie Cutlass to attend the Tribeca Film Festival red carpet at the United Palace in New York City for the screening of Jennifer Lopez Halftime documentary.

On June 7, 2024, Cutlass celebrated thirty years of his 1994 classic Hip Hop hit song "Puerto Rico Hooo" at Radio City Music Hall for the Tony Touch “Piece Maker Concert”. He also received a Citation from New York's Mayor Eric Adams at the Gracie Mansion.

On June 9, 2024, he was honored by the National Puerto Rican Day Parade naming him "The Son Of Puerto Rico".

== Personal life ==
In 1994, Frankie married Lorraine Ortiz in New York City; they have two daughters. The couple separated early 2006 and the marriage ended in 2008.

== Discography ==
=== Studio albums ===
- The Frankie Cutlass Show (1993), Hoody Records
- Politics & Bullshit (1997), Epic Records Violator Relativity Records
- New Wine (2004), God Squad Ent

=== EPs ===
- "DJ's Only" (2010), Cutlass Music Group
- "Ritmo Tropical" (2011), Cutlass Music Group

=== Singles ===
- "Puerto Rico 2006 Remix" featuring Joell Ortiz, Lumidee, Voltio & Yomo Toro (2006), Cutlass Music Group
- "The Cypher Part 3" featuring Big Daddy Kane, Biz Markie, Graig G & Roxxane Shante (1997), Epic Records Violator Relativity Records
- "You And You And You" featuring Redman, Sadat X & June Lover (1996), Violator Relativity Records
- "Boricuas on Da Set" featuring Fat Joe, Doo Wop & Ray Boogie (1995), Violator Relativity Records
- "Shake Watcha Mama Gave Ya" featuring Stick- E and the Hood (1994), Phat Wax/Strictly Records
- "Puerto Rico" featuring Ray Boogie (1994), Hoody Records
- "Wede Mans" featuring Selectah (1994), Hoody Records
- "Girls Fresh" featuring Rayvon (1994), Hoody Records
- "You'll Never Find Another Love" featuring & More (1987), Mic Mac Records
