= The Lover in You =

Single by Big Daddy Kane

from the album Prince of Darkness
- B-side: "Git Bizzy" and "Get Down"
- Released: February 20, 1992
- Recorded: 1991/1992
- Genre: Hip hop; pop rap
- Length: 4:19
- Label: Cold Chillin' / Warner Bros.
- Songwriter(s): Antonio Hardy; Prince
- Producer(s): Big Daddy Kane

Big Daddy Kane singles chronology
"Groove with It" (1991)	"The Lover in You" (1992)	"How U Get a Record Deal?" (1993)

"The Lover in You" is a song by American rapper, producer and actor Big Daddy Kane, released in February 1992 by Cold Chillin' / Warner Bros. as the second and final single from his fourth studio album, Prince of Darkness (1991). Produced by Kane, the song used a sample of Prince's 1985 hit "Pop Life", for which Prince is credited as a writer. It is based on an earlier rap of the same title by the Sugarhill Gang.

A remixed version samples the Loose Ends song "Hanging on a String", but it also reuses the original's synthesizer intro.

Though it did not reach the US Billboard Hot 100, the song was a hit on the Billboard R&B chart, peaking at number 26.

== Single track listing ==
=== A-Side ===
1. "The Lover in You" (Album Version) – 4:19
2. "The Lover in You" (Mr Cee's Remix) – 4:07
3. "The Lover in You" (Mr Cee's Remix Instrumental) – 4:08

=== B-Side ===
1. "Git Bizzy" (Album Version) – 3:33
2. "Get Down" (Remix) – 4:16
3. "Get Down" (Remix Instrumental) – 4:16

== Charts ==
Chart performance for "The Lover in You"
Chart (1992)	Peak position
UK Dance (Music Week)	47
UK Club Chart (Music Week)	22
US Hot R&B/Hip-Hop Songs (Billboard)	26
US Hot Rap Songs (Billboard)	28
