= Miss Info =

American radio presenter

- Born: Minya Oh; North Shore, Chicago, Illinois, U.S.
- Education: Columbia University
- Occupations: Radio personality, podcaster, journalist

Minya Oh, professionally known as Miss Info, is an American radio personality, podcaster and journalist.

== Early life and education ==
A native of the North Side of Chicago, Oh is the daughter of Korean immigrants. Oh graduated from Columbia University.

== Career ==
Formerly a writer and reporter for BET, Oh was an on-air radio personality on Hot 97 until 2014. Oh was a Music Lifestyles editor at Vibe, wrote for Rolling Stone, and a former Managing Editor for XXL. She has appeared as a pop culture pundit on the weekly VH1 program, Best Week Ever. She has also contributed to The Source, where she was known under her pen name Shortie.

Oh also hosts many Asian-centered events and concerts. She made an appearance in Asian American rapper Snacky Chan's music video 'Lonely Road.' Oh has also made a cameo on hip hop group Tanya Morgan's 2009 album "Brooklynati" and on the interlude at the end of the song "Just Arrived (Now What?)".

Beginning on March 31, 2014, she began starring in the new unscripted comedy series This Is Hot 97 on VH1.

In 2017, she launched a food series with Complex called Food Grails. Oh also maintains her own website and blog, MissInfo.TV.

In November 2021 alongside Nas, she began co-hosting a podcast on Spotify entitled "The Bridge: 50 Years of Hip Hop."

== Personal life ==
Oh previously lived in East Harlem, New York.
