= MA Doom: Son of Yvonne =

Studio album by Masta Ace
- Released: 17 July 2012
- Genre: East Coast hip-hop
- Length: 39:37
- Label: M3 Records; Fat Beats Records
- Producer: Masta Ace (exec); MF Doom

Masta Ace chronology
| Arts & Entertainment (2009) | MA Doom: Son of Yvonne (2012) | The Falling Season (2016) |

Singles from MA_Doom: Son of Yvonne
- 1. "Slow Down" Released: 26 April 2012

MA Doom: Son of Yvonne is the fourth solo and eighth overall studio album by American rapper Masta Ace. The beats on the album are sourced from the Special Herbs series of instrumental mixtapes by MF Doom; Doom did not directly collaborate with Masta Ace in the production of this album outside of giving Ace his blessing to use the beats. Doom, however, makes a vocal appearance on the song "Think I Am", alongside fellow guest star Big Daddy Kane. Other guests on the album include Pav Bundy, Reggie B and Milani the Artist. The album was released on 17 July 2012, via M3 Records and Fat Beats Records.

== Concept ==
Son of Yvonne is a concept album dedicated to Masta Ace's departed mother. It follows a short story of Masta Ace's upbringing.

== Track listing ==
- All tracks produced by MF Doom.

| No. | Title | Sample(s) | Length |
|---|---|---|---|
| 1. | "D Ski's Intro" | | 1:22 |
| 2. | "Nineteen Seventy Something" | * "Agrimony" by Metal Fingers | 2:52 |
| 3. | "Son of Yvonne" | * "Arrow Root" by Metal Fingers | 3:15 |
| 4. | "Da'Pro" | * "Fazers" by King Geedorah: "Buckeyes" by Metal Fingers | 3:00 |
| 5. | "Store Frontin'" | | 0:37 |
| 6. | "Me and My Gang" | * "Datura Stramonium" by Metal Fingers and Vast Aire | 3:35 |
| 7. | "Crush Hour" (featuring Pav Bundy) | * "?" by MF Doom | 2:42 |
| 8. | "Think I Am" (featuring Big Daddy Kane & MF Doom) | * "Nettle Leaves" by Metal Fingers | 2:40 |
| 9. | "Fresh Fest" (featuring Reggie B) | * "Myrrh" by Metal Fingers | 3:19 |
| 10. | "Hoe-Tel Leftovers" | | 0:32 |
| 11. | "Slow Down" | * "Safed Musli" by Metal Fingers | 4:33 |
| 12. | "Home Sweet Home" (featuring Pav Bundy) | * "White Willow Bark" by Metal Fingers | 3:00 |
| 13. | "Dedication" | | 1:00 |
| 14. | "I Did It" | * "Camphor" by Metal Fingers | 3:24 |
| 15. | "In da Spot" (featuring Milani the Artist) | * "Orris Root" by Metal Fingers | 2:54 |
| 16. | "Outtakes" | | 3:32 |
| Total length: | | | 39:37 |
