= Taste of Chocolate =

Studio album by Big Daddy Kane
- Released: October 30, 1990
- Recorded: 1990
- Genre: Hip hop
- Length: 53:25
- Labels: Cold Chillin'; Warner Bros.
- Producers: Big Daddy Kane; Prince Paul; Cool V; Mister Cee; Andre Booth

Big Daddy Kane chronology
It's a Big Daddy Thing (1989)	Taste of Chocolate (1990)	Prince of Darkness (1991)

Singles from Taste of Chocolate
- 1. "Cause I Can Do It Right" Released: November 10, 1990; 2. "All of Me" Released: February 2, 1991; 3. "It's Hard Being the Kane" Released: June 29, 1991

Professional ratings
Review scores
Source	Rating
AllMusic	4/5 stars
Christgau's Consumer Guide	(choice cut)
Entertainment Weekly	B
Los Angeles Times	3/5 stars
Rolling Stone	3.5/5 stars
The Source	4/5 stars

Taste of Chocolate is the third album by American rapper Big Daddy Kane, released in October 1990 on Cold Chillin' Records. The album reached No. 10 on the Billboard Top Soul Albums chart and No. 37 on the Billboard 200 chart.

== Overview ==
Barbara Weathers, Gerald Albright, and Barry White appeared on the album.

== Singles ==
"Cause I Can Do It Right" reached No. 22 on the Billboard Hot R&B Singles chart and No. 4 on the Billboard Hot Rap Singles chart. "It's Hard Being the Kane" reached No. 17 on the Billboard Hot Rap Singles chart and "All of Me" featuring Barry White got to No. 14 on the Billboard Hot R&B Singles chart.

== Track listing ==
All tracks are written by Big Daddy Kane, except where noted.

No.	Title	Writer(s)	Producer(s)	Length
1.	"Taste of Chocolate" (Intro)		Big Daddy Kane	2:05
2.	"Cause I Can Do It Right"		Big Daddy Kane	4:09
3.	"It's Hard Being the Kane"		Prince Paul	4:58
4.	"Who Am I" (featuring Gamilah Shabazz)	Big Daddy Kane; Gamilah Shabazz	Big Daddy Kane	4:00
5.	"Dance with the Devil"		Cool V	4:06
6.	"No Damn Good"		Prince Paul	3:52
7.	"All of Me" (featuring Barry White)	Big Daddy Kane; Barry White; Andre Booth	Andre Booth	5:45
8.	"Keep 'Em on the Floor" (featuring Barbara Weathers)		Big Daddy Kane	4:32
9.	"Mr. Pitiful"		Cool V	3:26
10.	"Put Your Weight on It"		Big Daddy Kane	2:47
11.	"Big Daddy vs. Dolemite" (featuring Rudy Ray Moore)	Big Daddy Kane; Rudy Ray Moore	Big Daddy Kane	4:49
12.	"Down the Line" (featuring Scoob Lover, Scrap Lover, Mister Cee, Lil Daddy Shane and Ant Live)		Mister Cee	5:11
13.	"Taste of Chocolate" (Exit)		Big Daddy Kane	3:20
Total length:				53:25

== Samples ==
- "Big Daddy vs. Dolemite"
  - "Whatcha See Is Whatcha Get" by the Dramatics
- "Cause I Can Do It Right"
  - "Stubborn Kind of Fellow" by Marvin Gaye
  - "I Heard It Through the Grapevine" by Gladys Knight & the Pips
  - "Get Up and Dance" by Freedom
- "Dance with the Devil"
  - "Different Strokes" by Syl Johnson
  - "Superpeople" by the Notations
- "It's Hard Being the Kane"
  - "Loose Booty" by Sly & the Family Stone
  - "Roadblock (12" Version)" by Stock, Aitken Waterman
- "Keep 'Em on the Floor"
  - "Talkin' Loud & Sayin' Nothing" by James Brown
- "Mr. Pitiful"
  - "Person to Person" by Average White Band
- "No Damn Good"
  - "Sophisticated Sissy" by Rufus Thomas
- "Put Your Weight on It"
  - "Impeach the President" by the Honey Drippers
  - "Rocket in the Pocket (Live)" by Cerrone
  - "The Big Beat" by Billy Squier
- "Taste of Chocolate"
  - "I'll Take You There" by the Staple Singers
  - "Was It Something That I Said" by Sylvester
  - "Get Out of My Life, Woman" by Lee Dorsey
  - "Poison" by Bell Biv DeVoe
- "Who Am I"
  - "Ain't Nobody Home" by B.B. King

== Charts ==
=== Weekly charts ===
Chart (1990)	Peak position
US Billboard 200	37
US Top R&B/Hip-Hop Albums (Billboard)	10

=== Year-end charts ===
Chart (1991)	Position
US Top R&B/Hip-Hop Albums (Billboard)	46

=== Singles ===
Year	Song	Hot R&B Singles	Hot Rap Singles	Hot Dance Music/Maxi-Singles Sales
1991	"Cause I Can Do It Right"	22	4	47
1991	"All of Me"	14	–	–
1991	"It's Hard Being the Kane"	91	17	–
