= Prince of Darkness (Big Daddy Kane album) =

Studio album by Big Daddy Kane
- Released: October 29, 1991
- Recorded: 1991
- Genre: Hip hop; new jack swing
- Length: 61:31
- Label: Cold Chillin'; Warner Bros.
- Producer: Big Daddy Kane; Michael Warner; Mister Cee; Michael Stokes; TR Love

Big Daddy Kane chronology
Taste of Chocolate (1990)	Prince of Darkness (1991)	Looks Like a Job For… (1993)

Professional ratings
Review scores
Source	Rating
AllMusic	2/5 stars
The Encyclopedia of Popular Music	2/5 stars
Entertainment Weekly	C+
The Rolling Stone Album Guide	3.5/5 stars
The Source	3/5 stars

Prince of Darkness is the fourth album by rapper Big Daddy Kane, released in 1991 on Cold Chillin' Records. The album features guest appearances from Q-Tip and Busta Rhymes, and features the singles "Groove with It", "Raw ’91" and "The Lover in You".

== Critical reception ==
The Rolling Stone Album Guide wrote that "Kane changes his style with Prince of Darkness, on some tracks augmenting his usually measured delivery with bursts of tongue-tripping wordplay."

== Track listing ==
All tracks are written and produced by Big Daddy Kane, except where noted.

No.	Title	Writer(s)	Producer(s)	Length
1.	"Prince of Darkness"			4:26
2.	"The Lover in You" (featuring Laree Williams)		Big Daddy Kane; Michael Warner	4:20
3.	"Git Bizzy"			3:33
4.	"Ooh, Aah, Nah-Nah-Nah"			3:48
5.	"Brother, Brother" (featuring Lil Daddy Shane)			4:12
6.	"Groove with It" (featuring Laree Williams)		Michael Stokes	5:04
7.	"I'm Not Ashamed" (featuring Alyson Williams)		Big Daddy Kane; Michael Warner	6:26
8.	"Troubled Man"		Mister Cee; Big Daddy Kane (co.); TR Love (co.)	4:04
9.	"T.L.C."		Big Daddy Kane; Michael Warner	4:41
10.	"Float"			3:44
11.	"Come On Down" (featuring Q-Tip and Busta Rhymes)	Big Daddy Kane; Q-Tip; Busta Rhymes		3:54
12.	"Death Sentence"			2:19
13.	"Get Down"			4:39
14.	"Raw '91"			4:30
15.	"DJ's Get No Credit" (featuring Mister Cee)		Mister Cee	1:56

== Album singles ==
Single information
"Groove with It"
- Released: October 17, 1991
- B-Side: "N/A"
"The Lover in You"
- Released: February 20, 1992
- B-Side: "Git Bizzy" and "Get Down"

== Samples ==
- "Ooh, Aah, Nah-Nah-Nah"
  - "Get Off" by Foxy (band)
- "Brother, Brother"
  - "Get Out of My Life, Woman" by Lee Dorsey
  - "Rockin' Chair" by Gwen McCrae
  - "Playing Your Game, Baby" by Barry White
- "Come On Down"
  - "Burnin' Bridges" by Lalo Schifrin
- "Death Sentence"
  - "Good Ole Music" by Funkadelic
  - "The Easiest Way to Fall" by Freda Payne
- "Get Bizzy"
  - "Da Doo Run Run" by The Crystals
  - "Ain't No Sunshine" by Bill Withers
  - "Give Me Your Love (Love Song)" by Curtis Mayfield
  - "Misdemeanor" by Foster Sylvers
  - "One Man Band (Plays All Alone) by Monk Higgins
- "Get Down"
  - "I Got Ants In My Pants" by James Brown
  - "The Big Beat" by Billy Squier
  - "Atomic Dog" by George Clinton
- "Prince Of Darkness"
  - "Be Alright" by Zapp
  - "Round and Round" by Tevin Campbell
- "Raw '91"
  - "Good to Me" by Otis Redding
  - "Raw" by Big Daddy Kane
  - "Rebel Without A Pause" by Public Enemy
- "The Lover In You"
  - "Pop Life" by Prince and The Revolution
  - "Hanging on a String" by Loose Ends

== Charts ==
=== Weekly charts ===
Chart (1991)	Peak position
US Billboard 200	57
US Top R&B/Hip-Hop Albums (Billboard)	25

=== Year-end charts ===
Chart (1992)	Position
US Top R&B/Hip-Hop Albums (Billboard)	77

=== Singles ===
Year	Song	Hot R&B Singles	Hot Rap Singles
1992	"Groove with It"	24	2
1992	"The Lover in You"	26	28
