= Smooth Operator (Big Daddy Kane song) =

Single by Big Daddy Kane

from the album It's a Big Daddy Thing
- B-side: "Warm It Up, Kane"
- Released: August 3, 1989
- Recorded: 1989
- Genre: Hip hop
- Length: 4:44
- Label: Cold Chillin' / Warner Bros.
- Songwriter: Antonio Hardy with the stage name Big Daddy Kane
- Producer: Big Daddy Kane

Big Daddy Kane singles chronology
"I'll Take You There" (1988)	"Smooth Operator" (1989)	"I Get the Job Done" (1989)

Music video
- "Smooth Operator" on YouTube

"Smooth Operator" is the lead single released from Big Daddy Kane's second album, It's a Big Daddy Thing. Arguably one of Big Daddy Kane's most popular songs, the song topped the newly formed Billboard Hot Rap Singles chart and was a hit on the R&B and dance charts, peaking at number 11 and 17 on the charts respectively. Actor and comedian Chris Rock appears in the music video getting his hair cut. He appears 2 minutes, and 23 seconds into the video.

== Samples ==
The song contains samples of "All Night Long" by Mary Jane Girls, "Do Your Thing" by Isaac Hayes from his soundtrack to the film Shaft (1971), "Sexual Healing" and "Let's Get It On" by Marvin Gaye, "The Champ" by The Mohawks, and "Impeach the President" by the Honey Drippers.

== Music video ==
The music video features a cameo by Al B. Sure! and rapper Kwamé and comedian and actor Chris Rock.

== Single track listing ==
=== A-Side ===
1. "Smooth Operator" – 4:42
2. "Smooth Operator" (Instrumental) – 4:40

=== B-Side ===
1. "Warm It Up, Kane" – 4:12
2. "Warm It Up, Kane" (Instrumental) – 4:12

== Charts ==
Chart (1989)	Peak position
US Hot R&B/Hip-Hop Songs (Billboard)	11
US Hot Rap Songs (Billboard)	1
