= Cipha Sounds =

American record producer (born 1976)

- Born: Luis Diaz; The Bronx, New York City, U.S.
- Presenting career
- Show: Cipha Saturdays, Cipha Sounds & Rosenberg, Juan Epstein
- Station: WQHT (Hot 97) (formerly)
- Time slot: 3:00pm - 7pm, Monday-Friday; 5pm-7pm Saturday; 12pm-2pm Tuesday Wednesday Thursday
- Style: Radio presenter, disc jockey
- Country: United States
- Website: www.ciphasounds.com

Cipha Sounds (born Luis Diaz) is an American DJ, comedian, and radio and television personality of Puerto Rican descent. He is mostly known for his work as a DJ, a VJ for MTV, and as a comedian.

== Biography ==
=== Radio career ===
In 1996, Sounds started as an intern with Wildman Steve and DJ Riz of New York's Flip Squad, and eventually Riz asked Sounds to spin at clubs with him as an opening DJ. Later on, Lil' Kim asked him to go on tour with her. For a year and a half, Sounds worked with Lil' Kim, touring the country and Europe. After he returned to the U.S., Hot 97's Funkmaster Flex asked Sounds to join his Big Dawg Pitbulls crew. He became a mix show DJ on Funkmaster Flex's evening show on Hot 97, and he eventually got his own show called Cipha Saturdays at the same station. On Sirius Satellite Radio's Shade 45 channel, he hosted a show called The Cipha Sounds Effect along with Angela Yee, DJ Wonder and the Emoticon Farragut Foster. He started the show in 2004, and his last show was on July 1, 2008. Before moving on from Shade 45, Sounds started The Juan Epstein Podcast which became the weekend morning show on Hot 97 with Peter Rosenberg. It aired every Sunday from 4am to 9am. The show was called The Cipha/Rosenberg Experience, and they were given a Saturday morning slot from 6am to 10am. HOT 97 later moved The Cipha/Rosenberg Experience to Mon-Fri 5am to 7am, which later grew to 5am to 10am. The HOT 97 Morning Show later added Ebro Darden and Laura Stylez. Cipha Sounds is known for being the first to play Rihanna, Rick Ross, and more on NYC Radio. When Angie Martinez left HOT 97 to move to POWER 105.1, Sounds took over her slot on Weekday afternoons. After months of growing tension, and less than 24 hours after he had criticized management on a podcast regarding his removal as interim host of the afternoon show, Sounds was fired from Hot 97. He was ultimately with the station for more than 17 years. It was announced on February 20, 2015, that Cipha Sounds had signed with Roc Nation.

==== Popularizing the air horn sound effect ====
Sounds started using the air horn sound in the late 1990s, and in 2001, he patented it. From then on the air horn was heavily used by Sounds on Hot 97. In an interview with Great Big Story, Sounds showed how he made his own sample of the horn: "I had to make my own version, so I would just hit the button once, but it would play like it was live, which is the one that kinda like exploded." The sound effect has since been used in film, television shows, video games, on radio and in music, having been sampled in many songs, such as "Welcome to Jamrock" by Damian Marley, "Forever" by Drake, Eminem, Kanye West and Lil Wayne, "Get the Message" by 50 Cent, and "Hold Up" by Beyoncé.

Sounds explained: "I began adapting the Jamaican style of DJing to hip hop. Instead of giving random shout outs like the hip hop DJs were doing, I'd connect my words to the sounds of the record. I did it on the radio, so it got a lot of exposure. The air horn noise came naturally because it was the one that you'd always make when you'd be joking around about reggae with your Jamaican friends."

==== Controversy ====
On December 17, 2010, Cipha Sounds stated on the air that "the reason [he is] HIV negative is because [he doesn't] mess with Haitian girls". Immediate outrage came from some in the Haitian community and others in New York to have him fired from Hot 97. He offered an apology shortly thereafter, remarking that it was simply "a stupid, tasteless joke" that was "taken totally the wrong way".

These remarks also drew criticism from other radio personalities namely Charlamagne Tha God, co-host of The Breakfast Club Power 105.1, in which he responded on-air by nominating Cipha Sounds for the show's "Donkey of the Day" (but instead for the "Year") and said:

"I'm from the south, so I know about hatred toward ethnic groups. So when he said that he reps Haitians heavy and he says 'sak pase' before all his parties, it was the equivalent to a racist red neck getting called out on being racist and saying to the people, I'm not racist, all my best friends are black. Any person who would throw hate at the Haitians at any time [soon after the Haiti earthquake], but especially at this moment and time...A person like this doesn't care about the people period...[Hot 97] 'so-called' suspended a guy during the holidays. He was gonna be off anyway! They don't care about the people, so why do we care about them?"

In 2025, Sounds participated in Saudi Arabia's Riyadh Comedy Festival, an event characterized by Human Rights Watch as an effort by the Saudi government to whitewash its human rights abuses.

=== Television career ===
From 2003 to 2006, Sounds was a DJ for Comedy Central's Chappelle's Show, for 19 episodes. In April 2006, he became the host of MTV's urban music video program Direct Effect which later became Sucker Freeand was occasionally on Total Request Live.

=== Music management and production ===
Sounds has his own artist management company called Jack Move, Inc. The first artists that he managed were the R&B duo Nina Sky in 2004, with the hit single "Move Ya Body". He has worked as an A&R executive for Rawkus Records, Tommy Boy Records, and The Neptunes' record label, Star Trak Entertainment. In 2005, he became the senior vice president of Jay-Z's Roc-La-Familia label, but he left after becoming a VJ for MTV in 2006. Cipha is also part of Black Jays International, a label managed by rapper Kardinal Offishall. In 2006, Sounds and Solitair of the Black Jays became a hip-hop/R&B production duo.

=== Comedy ===
In 2007, Sounds started a stand-up comedy series called Don't Get Gassed, a monthly show at Carolines on Broadway (NYC), billed as a Def Comedy Jam-type show. He is also the creator of the improv show Take It Personal at Upright Citizens Brigade Theater East in New York. The show features hip hop artists telling true life stories, which then inspire scenes performed by a cast of improvisors known as "A Tribe Called YES". Sounds and Alicia Keys reportedly had an improv comedy show in development for VH1. He also got passed at The Comedy Cellar in Greenwich Village, New York He also had a comedy series on Tidal. Since 2017, Sounds has hosted Laff Mobb's Laff Tracks on TruTv. Former "Def Comedy Jam" co-creator Bob Sumner is among "Laff Mobb's" executive producers.

=== Film appearance ===
Sounds was featured in the 2002 film 25th Hour, playing DJ Dusk and providing some original music.
