= WRLD (AM) =

Radio station in Reading, Pennsylvania

- Reading, Pennsylvania; United States
- Broadcast area: Reading, Pennsylvania
- Frequency: 1240 kHz
- Branding: Loud 98.5

Programming
- Format: Rhythmic CHR

Ownership
- Owner: (Major Keystone, LLC)

History
- First air date: 1946; 80 years ago
- Former call signs: WHUM (1946–1986); WAGO (1986–1993); WIOV (1993–2023)

Technical information
- Licensing authority: FCC
- Facility ID: 55307
- Class: C
- Power: 1,000 watts unlimited
- Transmitter coordinates: 40°19′29.4″N 75°56′29.0″W
- Translator: 98.5 W253CK (Reading)

Links
- Public license information: Public file; LMS
- Website: loudradiopa.com

WRLD (1240 AM) is a commercial radio station licensed to serve Reading, Pennsylvania. The station is licensed to Major Keystone, LLC, and broadcasts an rhythmic contemporary radio format. Its programming is also carried on FM translators W253CK (98.5).

WRLD previously broadcast all home and away games of the Reading Fightin Phils, the Double-A affiliate of the Philadelphia Phillies, and the Reading Royals of the ECHL.

Cumulus Media sold the station to Major Keystone LLC on September 24, 2021. On January 17, 2022, following the sale's completion, the then-WIOV changed its format from sports to rhythmic CHR, branded as "Loud 98.5"; the "Loud" programming, including the WQHT-based morning show Ebro in the Morning, had previously aired on W257DI (99.3 FM) and on the HD4channel of WLEV.

The station changed its call sign to WRLD on May 1, 2023.

== Previous logo ==
WIOV's logo under previous "ESPN 1240" branding

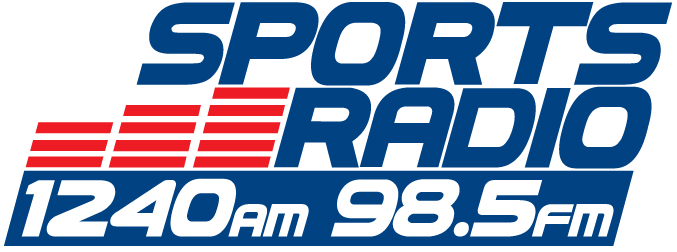
Previous CBS Sports Radio logo
