= Big Daddy Kane =

American rapper (born 1968)

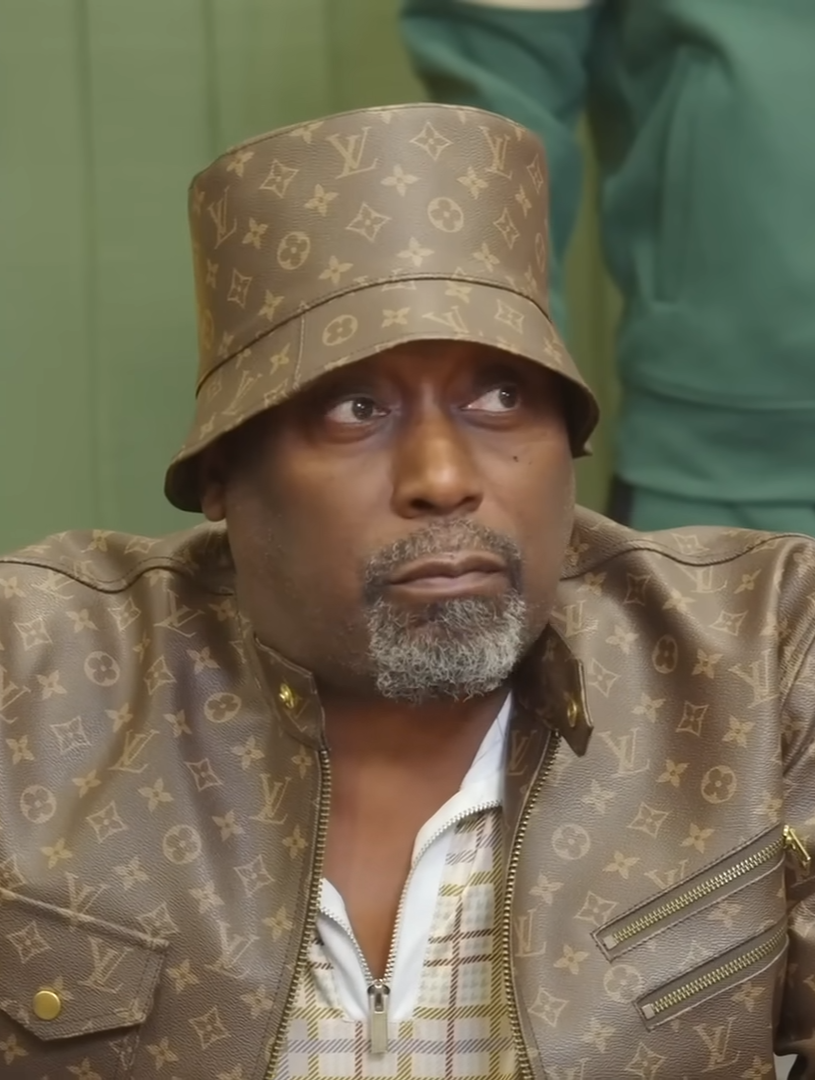
- Big Daddy Kane in 2023

Background information
- Also known as: Black Thunder
- Born: Antonio Hardy; September 10, 1968 (age 58); New York City, U.S.
- Genre: Hip-hop
- Occupations: Rapper; songwriter; record producer; actor
- Works: Discography
- Years active: 1987–present
- Labels: Cold Chillin'; Warner Bros.; MCA; Blackheart; Mercury; PolyGram
- Formerly of: Juice Crew
- Website: officialbigdaddykane.com

Antonio Hardy (born September 10, 1968), better known by his stage name Big Daddy Kane, is an American rapper, producer and actor who began his career in 1986 as a member of the Juice Crew. He is widely regarded as one of the most influential and skilled MCs in hip-hop. Rolling Stone ranked his song "Ain't No Half-Steppin'" 25th on its list of The 50 Greatest Hip-Hop Songs of All Time, calling him "a master wordsmith of rap's ... golden age and a huge influence on a generation of MCs."

== Biography ==
Antonio Hardy was born on September 10, 1968, in Brooklyn, New York City.

=== 1980s ===
In high school, Kane met Mister Cee, who later played an integral role in Kane's career as his DJ. In 1984, Kane became friends with Biz Markie, and he co-wrote some of Biz's best-known lyrics. Both became members of the Queens-based Juice Crew, a collective headed by producer Marley Marl. Kane signed with Tyrone Williams's and Len Fichtelberg's Cold Chillin' Records label in 1987 and debuted the same year with the 12" single "Raw". The name Big Daddy Kane came from a variation on Caine, David Carradine's character on the TV show Kung Fu, and the character Big Daddy played by Vincent Price in the 1963 film Beach Party.

Kane is known for his ability to syncopate over fast beats. Despite his asthma, he is a pioneer of fast rhyming. His sense of style is renowned and set a number of late-1980s and early-1990s hip hop trends (high-top fades hairstyles, velour suits, and four-finger rings). The backronym "King Asiatic Nobody's Equal" is often applied to his moniker.

In 1988, Kane released his debut album, Long Live the Kane, which featured the hit "Ain't No Half Steppin'". In 1989, he released his second album and biggest hit to date, It's a Big Daddy Thing, which included 1970s sample throwbacks like "Smooth Operator" and the Teddy Riley-produced track "I Get the Job Done". He also had a verse on the Marley Marl-produced track "The Symphony" (1988), which included Juice Crew members Craig G, Masta Ace, and Kool G Rap.

=== 1990s ===
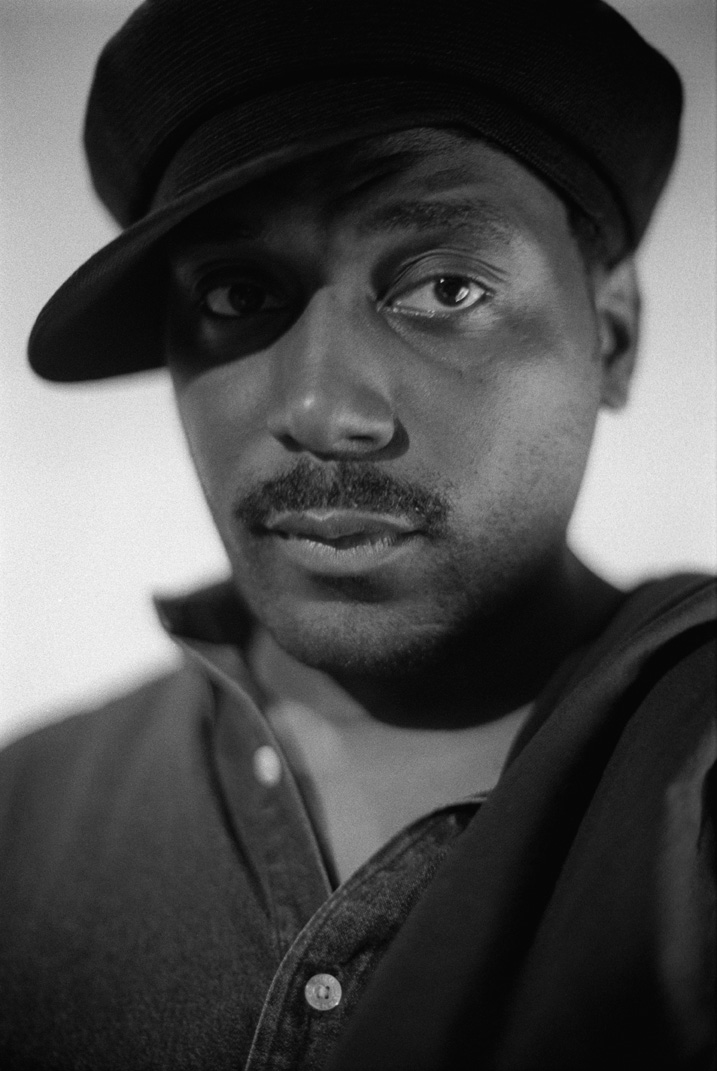
Big Daddy Kane in 1998

In 1990, Big Daddy Kane was featured as a guest rapper on Public Enemy's Fear of a Black Planet, on the song "Burn Hollywood Burn", in which he discussed the depiction of African-American characters particularly in the Jim Crow Era. Big Daddy Kane also referenced Aunt Jemima as an example of how Black women were characterized and given low-status roles, with the lyrics "And Black women in this profession / As for playing a lawyer, out of the question / For what they play Aunt Jemima is the perfect term".

Big Daddy Kane appeared on Patti LaBelle's 1991 effort "Burnin'". He provided the rap chorus to the single "Feels Like Another One". He also appeared on the video release "Live in New York".

He contributed the song "'Nuff Respect" to the soundtrack of Ernest Dickerson's feature film debut Juice, which starred Omar Epps and Tupac Shakur, further demonstrating his fast lyrical delivery.

In 1991, Kane won the Grammy Award for Best Rap Performance by a Duo or Group for his performance on the Quincy Jones collaborative track "Back on the Block" from the album of the same name.

As an actor, he debuted in Mario Van Peebles's 1993 western Posse, and appeared in Robert Townsend's 1993 film The Meteor Man. He also posed for Playgirl and Madonna's book Sex during the 1990s.

During the early 1990s, a then-unknown Jay-Z toured with Kane, and Kane helped him early in his career. Ice-T said: "I actually met Jay-Z with Kane. Kane brought Jay-Z over to my house." Kane has said that Jay-Z "wasn't a hypeman, he basically made cameo appearances on stage. When I would leave the stage to go change outfits, I would bring out Jay-Z and Positive K and let them freestyle until I came back to the stage." Jay-Z was also featured on Big Daddy Kane's track "Show & Prove" from Daddy's Home (1994) and in the video.

In 1996, Kane recorded with MC Hammer and Tupac Shakur on the song "Too Late Playa" (along with Danny Boy) originally meant for Hammer's unreleased album Too Tight, as well as recording with Shakur on the unreleased song "Wherever U R (Sho' Shot)". He was said to be close to signing with Death Row East that year, but decided not to after Shakur was killed in September. In 1997, Kane teamed up with Frankie Cutlass on his single "The Cypher Part 3" and some of Marley Marl Juice Crew veterans. In 1998, he released his final solo album to date, Veteranz' Day. It received mixed reviews and did not sell well, but Kane did not give up rapping.

=== 2000s ===
In 2000, Big Daddy Kane appeared on Tony Touch's "The Piece Maker" mixtape alongside Kool G Rap and KRS-One. A rejuvenated Kane occasionally collaborated with a variety of hip-hop artists, including A Tribe Called Quest, Jurassic 5, Little Brother, and DJ Babu of the Beat Junkies. He released two singles, the Alchemist-produced "The Man, The Icon", and the DJ Premier-produced "Any Type of Way" (on which he discusses urban collapse in post-9/11 New York City ("Giuliani got New York lookin' like it's Amistad") and the erosion of the middle class.

Big Daddy Kane appeared on the trip hop group Morcheeba's 2003 single "What's Your Name".

In 2005, Big Daddy Kane was honored during the VH1 Hip-Hop Honors. After a medley of hits performed by T.I., Black Thought, and Common, he came out to perform "Warm It Up, Kane" with his old dancers, Scoob and Scrap. Kane and Kool G Rap can both be seen briefly in Dave Chappelle's Block Party.

In 2006, he appeared as a guest MC on the track "Get Wild Off This", produced by the Stanton Warriors for their Stanton Sessions Vol. 2 breaks mix. He also appeared alongside the Wu-Tang Clan, Rakim, Busta Rhymes, and Q-Tip in a segment of the 2006 Summer Jam concert (June 7, 2006), as part of an initiative by Busta Rhymes to honor the legacy of New York City hip-hop.

In 2007, a new track, "BK Mentality", was released on the mixtape compilation Official Joints. Kane also appeared on Joell Ortiz's The Brick: Bodega Chronicles mixtape.

Big Daddy Kane made a cameo in the 2008 video for "Game's Pain" by The Game. The video also featured Raekwon, Three 6 Mafia and Ice Cube. Kane also appeared on the remix of "Don't Touch Me" by Busta Rhymes. Also in 2009, Kane played the role of Clay in the film Just Another Day. The film follows two rappers, one poor and young, one older and successful, through a day in their lives.

=== 2010s ===
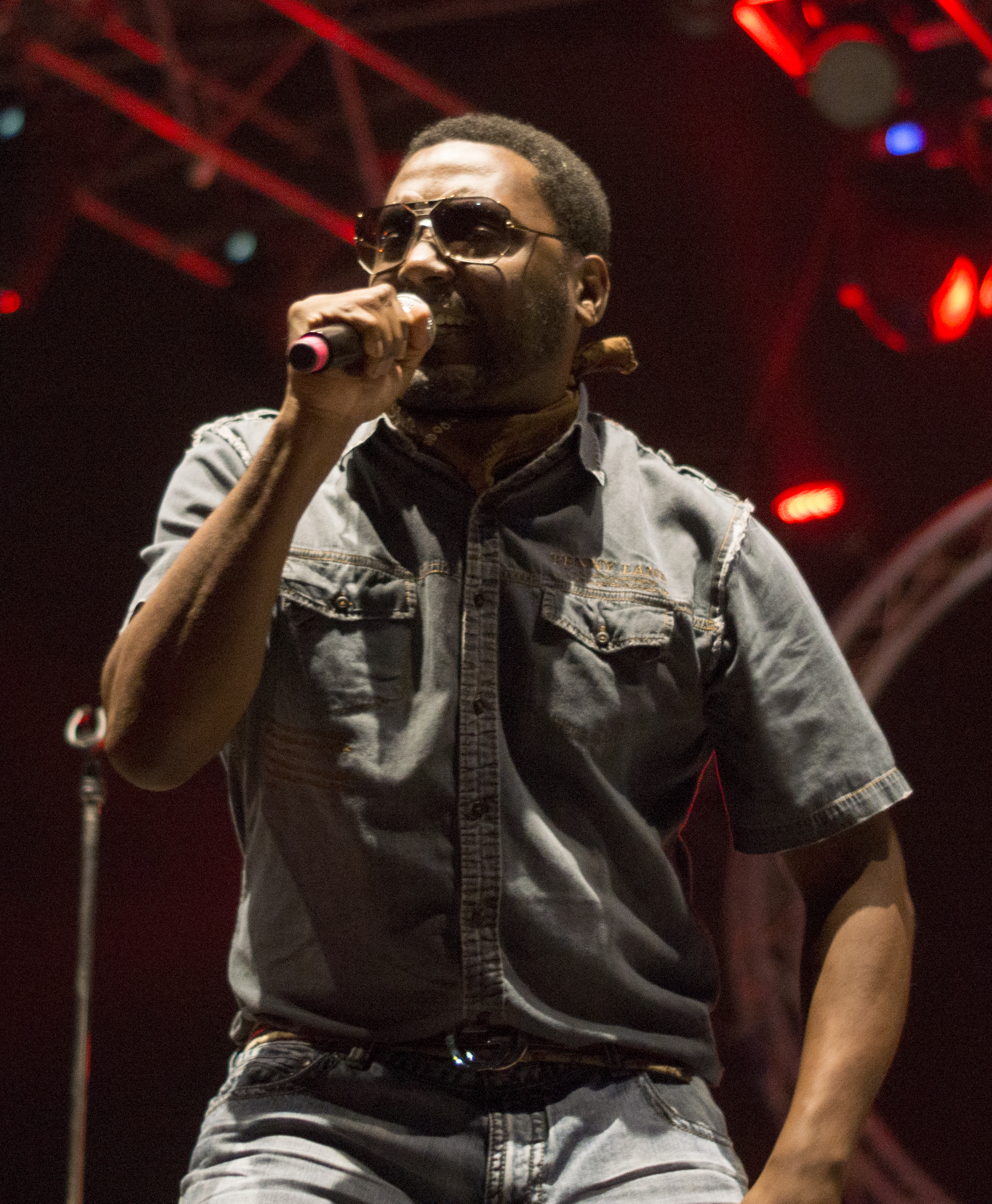
Big Daddy Kane performing at Hip Hop Kemp in 2013

Big Daddy Kane appears on one track on MA Doom: Son of Yvonne—the collaboration between MF Doom and former Juice Crew member Masta Ace. As of 2013, Kane was recruited by New York City power group Lifted Crew and R&B singer Showtyme to form a band called "Las Supper". Its album Back to the Future was released on March 26, 2013.

On November 24, 2014, Big Daddy Kane discussed his upbringing, childhood influences, relationships, sexual experiences, and Madonna's 1992 book Sex in an interview on the Dr. Zoe Today show. In 2016, he was featured on Tito Jackson's single "Get It Baby" and appeared in the documentary Hip-Hop Evolution.

=== 2020s ===
In June 2020, Kane released the single "Enough", about police brutality. In June 2026, he announced he was completing a new and final album, Curtain Call.

== Legacy ==
Big Daddy Kane is regarded as one of the most influential and skilled golden age rappers. MTV ranked him 7th on its "Greatest MCs of All Time" list. He is 4th in Kool Moe Dee's book There's a God on the Mic: The True 50 Greatest MCs. About.com ranked him third on its list of the "Top 50 MCs of Our Time", and RZA listed him as one of his "Top 5 best MCs". In 2012, The Source ranked him 8th on its list of the "Top 50 Lyricists of All Time". AllMusic wrote, "his best material ranks among the finest hip-hop of its era, and his sex-drenched persona was enormously influential on countless future would-be players", calling him "an enormously talented battle MC" and "one of rap's major talents", citing his "near-peerless technique" and "first-rate technique and rhyming skills", and saying he "had the sheer verbal facility and razor-clean dexterity to ambush any MC and exhilarate anyone who witnessed or heard him perform". Kool Moe Dee called him "one of the most imitated emcees ever in the game" and "one of the true greatest emcees ever". Ice-T said:

To me, Big Daddy Kane is still today one of the best rappers. I would put Big Daddy Kane against any rapper in a battle. Jay-Z, Nas, Eminem, any of them. I could take his 'Raw' "swagger" from 88 and put it up against any record [from today]. Kane is one of the most incredible lyricists... and he will devour you on the mic. I don't want to try to out-rap Big Daddy Kane. Big Daddy Kane can rap circles around cats.

His first two albums are considered hip hop classics. Rolling Stone wrote, "he has received consistent critical kudos". In the book Rap-Up: The Ultimate Guide to Hip-Hop and R&B, Cameron and Devin Lazerine say Big Daddy Kane is "widely seen as one of the best lyricists of his time and even today regularly gets name-checked by younger dudes", and music journalist Peter Shapiro says Kane is "perhaps the most complete MC ever". Eminem references Big Daddy Kane in his song "Yellow Brick Road", saying, "we was on the same shit, that Big Daddy Kane shit, where compound syllables sound combined", and quotes the same lines in his book The Way I Am.

== Discography ==
=== Studio albums ===
- Long Live the Kane (1988)
- It's a Big Daddy Thing (1989)
- Taste of Chocolate (1990)
- Prince of Darkness (1991)
- Looks Like a Job For... (1993)
- Daddy's Home (1994)
- Veteranz Day (1998)
- Curtain Call (2026)

=== Collaboration albums ===
- Back to the Future with The Las Supper (2013)

== Filmography ==
Year	Title	Role
1993	Posse	Father Time
1993	The Meteor Man	Pirate
2005	Dave Chappelle's Block Party	Himself
2007	Dead Heist	Hunter
2008	Love for Sale	Unknown
2009	Just Another Day	Clay
2011	Budz House	Keisha
2016	Exposed	Jonathan "Black" Jones
2024	ElemenTory	Chris Cunningham

== Television ==
Year	Title	Role
2018	Law & Order: Special Victims Unit	Ray Wallis / "Four Stroke"
2022	The Equalizer	"Buffalo Joe"
