= Bad Boy's 10th Anniversary... The Hits =

Greatest hits album by Bad Boy Records
- Released: March 9, 2004
- Recorded: 1993–2004
- Genre: East Coast hip hop; R&B
- Length: 1:03:26
- Label: Bad Boy; Universal
- Producer: Sean "Puffy" Combs (executive); The Hitmen (Including Deric "D-Dot" Angelettie; Steven "Stevie J" Jordan; Ron "Amen-Ra" Lawrence; Nashiem Myrick; Carlos "6 July" Broady; Jeffery "J-Dub" Walker; Yogi); Black Jeruz; Big Jaz

Bad Boy Records chronology
Bad Boys II: The Soundtrack (2003)	Bad Boy's 10th Anniversary... The Hits (2004)	Bad Boy's R&B Hits (2004)

Singles from Bad Boy's 10th Anniversary... The Hits
- 1. "Victory 2004" Released: March 16, 2004

Professional ratings
Review scores
Source	Rating
Allmusic	3/5 stars

Bad Boy's 10th Anniversary...The Hits is the second greatest hits album released by Bad Boy Records and Universal Records on March 9, 2004. The only single released was "Victory 2004", a remix of P. Diddy's "Victory" off No Way Out. Victory 2004 featured The Notorious B.I.G. (his 2 verses from the original Victory), Busta Rhymes, 50 Cent & Lloyd Banks. For reasons unknown, the censored versions of "Hypnotize" and "Mo Money Mo Problems" appear on the uncensored version of the album.

== Track listing ==
#	Title	Length	Performers	Producer(s)
1	"Victory 2004" (Remix)	6:21	P. Diddy, The Notorious B.I.G., Busta Rhymes, 50 Cent, Lloyd Banks	Steven "Stevie J" Jordan for The Hitmen
2	"Flava in Ya Ear" (Remix)	5:02	Craig Mack, The Notorious B.I.G., Rampage, LL Cool J, Busta Rhymes, Puff Daddy	Easy Mo Bee
3	"Hypnotize"	3:50	The Notorious B.I.G.	Sean "Puffy" Combs, Deric "D-Dot" Angelettie, & Ron "Amen-Ra" Lawrence for The Hitmen
4	"Whoa!"	4:04	Black Rob	Buckwild
5	"It's All About the Benjamins"	4:38	P. Diddy, The Notorious B.I.G., Lil' Kim, The Lox	Sean "Puffy" Combs & Deric "D-Dot" Angelettie for The Hitmen
6	"Big Poppa"	4:10	The Notorious B.I.G.	Chucky Thompson & Sean "Puffy" Combs
7	"I Need a Girl (Part Two)"	4:46	P. Diddy, Mario Winans, Ginuwine, Loon	Mario "Yellow Man" Winans, Sean "Puffy" Combs
8	"Mo Money Mo Problems"	4:17	The Notorious B.I.G., Mase, Puff Daddy	Steven "Stevie J" Jordan & Sean "Puffy" Combs
9	"Can't You See"	4:37	Total, The Notorious B.I.G.	Sean "Puffy" Combs & Rashad Smith
10	"Only You" (Bad Boy Remix)	4:49	112, The Notorious B.I.G., Mase	Sean "Puffy" Combs & Steven "Stevie J" Jordan
11	"Feel So Good"	3:25	Mase	Sean "Puffy" Combs & Deric "D-Dot" Angelettie
12	"I Wish"	3:47	Carl Thomas	Mike City
13	"I'll Be Missing You"	5:02	P. Diddy, Faith Evans, 112	Sean "Puffy" Combs & Steven "Stevie J" Jordan
14	"P. Diddy Outro"	0:27	P. Diddy	
15	"I'm No Killa" (bonus track)	4:18	Mase	

== Charts ==
=== Weekly charts ===
Chart (2004)	Peak position
US Billboard 200	2
US Top R&B/Hip-Hop Albums (Billboard)	1

=== Year-end charts ===
Chart (2004)	Position
US Billboard 200	146
US Top R&B/Hip-Hop Albums (Billboard)	54
