= Going Back to Cali =

Going Back to Cali may refer to:

- "Going Back to Cali" (LL Cool J song), released 1988
- "Going Back to Cali" (The Notorious B.I.G. song), released 1997
