= Been Around the World =

Single by Puff Daddy featuring the Notorious B.I.G. and Mase

from the album No Way Out
- Released: November 14, 1997
- Recorded: 1997
- Genre: East Coast hip-hop
- Length: 5:26 (album version); 4:36 (edit)
- Label: Bad Boy; Arista
- Songwriters: Sean Combs; Ron "Amen-Ra" Lawrence; Mason Betha; Christopher Wallace; Deric Angelettie; David Bowie; Lisa Stansfield; Ian Devaney; Andrew Morris
- Producers: Sean "Puffy" Combs; Ron "Amen-Ra" Lawrence; Deric Angelettie

Puff Daddy singles chronology
"It's All About the Benjamins" (1997)	"Been Around the World" (1997)	"Nothin' Move But the Money" (1998)

The Notorious B.I.G. singles chronology
"It's All About the Benjamins" (1997)	"Been Around the World" (1997)	"Sky's the Limit" / "Going Back to Cali" (1997)

Mase singles chronology
"Feel So Good" (1997)	"Been Around the World" (1997)	"What You Want" (1997)

Music video
- "Been Around the World" on YouTube

"Been Around the World" is a song by American rapper Puff Daddy, featuring the Notorious B.I.G. and Mase, released by Bad Boy and Arista Records on November 14, 1997 as the fourth single from Puff Daddy's debut studio album, No Way Out (1997). The song samples David Bowie's 1983 hit song "Let's Dance", and contains an interpolation of Lisa Stansfield's song "All Around the World", performed by the Notorious B.I.G. in the chorus. In the album version, the song concludes with a skit featuring an interview with one of the song's producers, the Madd Producer.

As with No Way Out's previous three singles—each of which peaked at numbers one or two on the Billboard Hot 100 chart—"Been Around the World" peaked at number two on the chart, for the weeks dated January 3 and 10. "Been Around the World" did reach No. 1 on Billboard's Hot Rap Tracks and Hot R&B/Hip-Hop Songs charts.

== Music video ==
The song's music video was directed by Paul Hunter. It features Mase and Puff Daddy as spies. The video includes appearances by Vivica A. Fox, Quincy Jones, Wyclef Jean and Jennifer Lopez.

== Track listing ==
1. Been Around The World (Radio Edit) featuring the Notorious B.I.G. & Mase (4:04)
2. It's All About The Benjamins (Rock Remix I) featuring the Notorious B.I.G., Lil' Kim, The Lox, Dave Grohl, Perfect, FuzzBubble, & Rob Zombie (4:45)
3. It's All About The Benjamins (Rock Remix II) featuring the Notorious B.I.G., Lil' Kim, The Lox, Dave Grohl, Perfect, FuzzBubble, Rob Zombie, & Size 14 (4:42)
4. It's All About The Benjamins (Album Version) featuring the Notorious B.I.G., Lil' Kim, & The Lox (4:38)

== Charts ==
=== Weekly charts ===
Chart (1997–1998)	Peak position
Australia (ARIA)	48
Austria (Ö3 Austria Top 40)	26
Belgium (Ultratop 50 Flanders)	30
Belgium (Ultratop 50 Wallonia)	40
Croatia (HRT)	8
Estonia (Eesti Top 20)	5
Finland (Suomen virallinen lista)	20
Germany (GfK)	41
Netherlands (Dutch Top 40)	22
Netherlands (Single Top 100)	40
New Zealand (Recorded Music NZ)	3
Scotland Singles (Official Charts)	44
Sweden (Sverigetopplistan)	22
Switzerland (Schweizer Hitparade)	39
UK Singles (Official Charts)	20
UK Hip Hop/R&B (Official Charts)	4
US Billboard Hot 100	2
US Hot R&B/Hip-Hop Songs (Billboard)	7
US Hot Rap Songs (Billboard)	1
US Rhythmic Airplay (Billboard)	17

=== Year-end charts ===
Chart (1998)	Position
UK Urban (Music Week)	6
US Billboard Hot 100	19
US Hot R&B Singles (Billboard)	21
US Maxi-Singles Sales (Billboard)	40

== Certifications ==
Region	Certification	Certified units/sales
New Zealand (RMNZ)	Platinum	10,000^{*}
United States (RIAA)	Platinum	1,600,000
^{*} Sales figures based on certification alone.
