= No Way Out (Puff Daddy album) =

Studio album by Puff Daddy & the Family
- Released: July 22, 1997
- Recorded: 1996–1997
- Genre: East Coast hip-hop
- Length: 77:52
- Labels: Bad Boy; Arista
- Producers: Sean "Puffy" Combs; The Hitmen; Big Jaz

Puff Daddy & the Family chronology
No Way Out (1997)	Forever (1999)

Singles from No Way Out
- 1. "Can't Nobody Hold Me Down" Released: January 7, 1997; 2. "I'll Be Missing You" Released: May 27, 1997; 3. "It's All About the Benjamins" Released: August 12, 1997; 4. "Been Around the World" Released: November 14, 1997; 5. "Victory" Released: March 17, 1998

No Way Out is the debut studio album by American rapper Sean Combs, under the stage name Puff Daddy. It was released on July 22, 1997, through Arista Records and Combs' own Bad Boy Records. The album is credited to "Puff Daddy & the Family", with "the Family" referring to guest appearances from his signees at Bad Boy, including its then-recently deceased flagship artist, the Notorious B.I.G.

No Way Out's production was heavily influenced by the murder of the Notorious B.I.G. months prior to its release. This album conveys this as a tragic event with a profound impact on Combs, who channels both aggressive and introspective lyrics capturing the before-and-after of his death. Production was largely handled by Bad Boy's in-house production team The Hitmen, while guest appearances include B.I.G., Busta Rhymes, Mase, Lil' Kim, Carl Thomas, Jay-Z, Black Rob, the LOX, Ginuwine, Twista, Foxy Brown, Faith Evans, and 112.

Five singles were released from the album. Its lead single, "Can't Nobody Hold Me Down", reached number one on the Billboard Hot 100 several weeks after its January 1997 release. The second single, "I'll Be Missing You", became a global hit and was the first hip-hop song to debut atop the Billboard Hot 100. The fourth single, "Been Around the World", peaked at number two in the chart. Other singles included "It's All About the Benjamins" and "Victory", with the latter reaching number 19 on the Billboard Hot 100.

Upon release, No Way Out achieved major commercial success, debuting atop the Billboard 200 with first-week sales exceeding 561,000 copies. While critical response was mixed to positive, it won Best Rap Album from five nominations at the 40th Annual Grammy Awards. It remains Combs' best-selling album, with over 7 million copies shipped in the United States, and is widely regarded as a classic hip-hop album. Retrospective reviews—from Billboard, Entertainment Weekly, and MTV—of the album have criticized its heavy reliance on sampling.

== Background ==
Speaking about the album's title, Sean Combs said that because of the Notorious B.I.G.'s death on March 9, 1997, he had felt that there was "no way out, [...] you have to live your life, you have to live in these conditions that are here, only thing you can do is try to make it better". The album's lyrical content was inspired by the emotions that he felt while mourning the loss of his close friend. In the song "Is This the End?" he raps about experiencing the drive-by shooting that happened in Los Angeles, California, which took the Notorious B.I.G.'s life. The album was originally called Puff Daddy & the Goodfellas, then slated to be titled Hell Up in Harlem, but following the death of the Notorious B.I.G., he decided to switch the album's title to No Way Out.

As discussed in the book Unbelievable: The Life, Death, and Afterlife of the Notorious B.I.G. by Cheo Hodari Coker, the weight of the East Coast–West Coast hip-hop rivalry and the accompanying threats had taken its toll on Combs and those around him. It was decided that they needed to get away and become focused on making hits. So, Combs brought producers Steven "Stevie J." Jordan, Deric "D-Dot" Angelettie, Nashiem Myrick and Ron Lawrence as well as engineers Axel Niehaus and Tony Maserati down to the Caribbean Sound Basin studio in Maraval, Trinidad, along with everything that they needed to craft hits. In the book, Combs is quoted as saying, "For the next two years, I wanna have radio on lock. Call the girlfriend, wifey, or whatever, and let 'em know that you're not gonna be around for a few weeks. We're gonna get away from all this drama, put our heads together, and when we come back, we’re coming back with hits." The material would later be used on No Way Out, Life After Death and other Bad Boy albums from 1997 to 1999.

== Accolades ==
In the United States, the album topped on the Billboard charts, with 561,000 copies sold in the first week. The album topped music charts worldwide for 24 non-consecutive weeks. In 1998, No Way Out would win the Grammy Award for the Best Rap Album. On September 7, 2000, the album was certified seven-times platinum by the Recording Industry Association of America (RIAA). In 1997, among the ten songs that reached at number one on the Billboard Hot 100 list, four of them belonged to Bad Boy Records.

The album spawned two Billboard Hot 100 number-one singles – "Can't Nobody Hold Me Down" and "I'll Be Missing You" – and the "number 2" singles "Been Around the World" and "It's All About the Benjamins". The longest reign of the label's four hits was this single "I'll Be Missing You", which topped the charts for 11 weeks. The melody for "I'll Be Missing You" is sampled from the Police's 1983 hit "Every Breath You Take". This successful album led to Combs to be named as one of Forbes' 40th highest-paid entertainers, along with rapper Master P and Oprah Winfrey.

The music video for "Been Around the World" features cameo appearances by singer Jennifer Lopez, playing Combs's love interest in a fictional storyline. Its positive reception led to widespread rumors of a personal relationship between the two in the media. This was later confirmed when Combs and Lopez dated for a period of time in the late 1990s. Furthermore, the music video for "Victory" was one of the most expensive videos ever made. The song titled "No Way Out" performed by Combs, appeared on the soundtrack for the film Money Talks (1997), but is not included on this album.

== Reception ==
Professional ratings
Review scores
Source	Rating
AllMusic	4/5 stars
Entertainment Weekly	C+
The Guardian	2/5 stars
NME	6/10
Pitchfork	7.8/10
RapReviews	9/10
Rolling Stone	2.5/5 stars
The Village Voice	(2-star Honorable Mention)

=== Critical reception ===
Since its release, the album has been evaluated in the context of the East Coast–West Coast hip-hop rivalry and deaths of Tupac Shakur and the Notorious B.I.G. The sampling of hits from past decades has also been debated by critics. In 1997, Neil Strauss of The New York Times called Combs the "king of sampled hits".

No Way Out received a wide range of reviews. AllMusic rated the album four out of five stars, with Leo Stanley calling it "a compelling, harrowing album" and "more substantial...than most mid-'90s hip-hop releases". For Vibe, Michael A. Gonzales praised the producers for creating "fierce, moody sonic mainpulations that are changing the soundscapes of pop music".

Positive reviews continued in later years. RapReviews rated the album 9 out of 10 points in 2007. "The replay value is astronomical, and the album is packed full of great beats, classic singles and excellent guest appearances," wrote Jesal Padania for the site. Reviewing the album in 2017, Pitchfork rated it 7.8 out of 10 points, regarding it as "a party record spotted with bouts of depression and sorrow" and "feel-good music that tops the charts".

Other reviews were less favorable, especially towards the lyrics and production. Grading the album a C+, Entertainment Weekly critic J. D. Considine pointed out "the obvious contradictions within their shoot-first, mourn-your-friends-later attitude" of Combs and his collaborators. Considine also questioned the choice of samples, in calling "Can't Nobody Hold Me Down" and other tracks "shamelessly derivative". For Billboard, Havelock Nelson commented: "...the over-reliance on huge swathes of undiluted samples is simply clumsy, lazy, and demeaning to the sources." MTV acknowledged that Combs' repurposing of older songs was commercially successful but pointed out: "...there is a clear difference between sampling snippets and manipulating them into a beat...and just straight-away rapping over a relatively recent hit record." For SonicNet, Kembrew McLeod called Puff Daddy "the end-of-the-millennium answer to MC Hammer."

For Rolling Stone, Nathan Brackett compared Combs's rapping style on the tracks with guest appearances by the Notorious B.I.G.: "B.I.G.'s rhymes are dynamic, authoritative; Puff Daddy's voice is thin, and he delivers his verses in a flat monotone." Regarding the samples, Brackett commented that Combs was among "artists who merely bask in the reflected glory of the songs from which they draw."

=== Commercial performance ===
Upon release, No Way Out was quickly met with commercial success. In Combs' home country of the United States, it debuted atop the Billboard 200 with 561,000 copies sold in its first week. Supported by five commercially successful singles, including "I'll Be Missing You", which, along with the album itself, served as a tribute to the then-recently deceased Notorious B.I.G.. The song became the first in hip hop to debut atop the Billboard Hot 100, where it remained for 11 consecutive weeks, while topping several other charts worldwide. The album's first single, released prior to the Notorious B.I.G.'s death, "Can't Nobody Hold Me Down", also peaked atop the chart, for seven consecutive weeks.

Its fourth single, "Been Around the World", peaked at number two on the Billboard Hot 100, while its fifth, "Victory" peaked within the top 20. No Way Out was the best-selling rap album of 1997 in Canada. On September 7, 2000, the album received septuple platinum certification by the Recording Industry Association of America (RIAA), for sales of 7,000,000 units in the United States.

As of 2025, it remains Combs' most commercially successful release.

== Track listing ==
All tracks, with the exception of "I Got the Power", were produced by members of Bad Boy's in-house production team, the Hitmen. The tracklisting was slightly altered on the album's clean version, where it was shortened down to thirteen songs.

No Way Out – digital download and streaming
No.	Title	Writer(s)	Producer(s)	Length
1.	"No Way Out (Intro)"	Sean Combs; Steven Jordan	Stevie J	1:22
2.	"Victory" (featuring the Notorious B.I.G. and Busta Rhymes)	Combs; Christopher Wallace; Trevor George Smith Jr.; Jordan	Stevie J; Puff Daddy^{[a]}	4:56
3.	"Been Around the World" (featuring the Notorious B.I.G. and Mase)	Combs; Wallace; Mason Betha; Deric Angelettie; Ron Lawrence; David Bowie; Lisa Stansfield; Ian Devaney; Andy Morris	Puff Daddy; D-Dot; Amen-Ra^{[a]}	5:25
4.	"What You Gonna Do?"	Combs; Kimberly Jones; Lawrence; Nashiem Myrick	Puff Daddy; Amen-Ra; Myrick	4:55
5.	"Don't Stop What You're Doing" (featuring Lil' Kim)	Combs; Jones; Lawrence	Puff Daddy; Amen-Ra^{[b]}	3:58
6.	"If I Should Die Tonight (Interlude)" (featuring Carl Thomas)	Combs; Carl Thomas; Jeffery Walker	Puff Daddy; J-Dub^{[b]}	2:59
7.	"Do You Know?"	Combs; Angelettie; Shawn Carter	Puff Daddy; D-Dot^{[c]}	6:06
8.	"Young G's" (featuring Jay-Z and the Notorious B.I.G.)	Combs; Carter; Wallace; Burton Smith	Rashad Smith	5:25
9.	"I Love You, Baby" (featuring Black Rob)	Combs; Robert Ross; Lawrence; Jay Garfield	Puff Daddy; Ron Lawrence; Waxx; Jesse "Corparal" Wilson	4:03
10.	"It's All About the Benjamins" (featuring the LOX, the Notorious B.I.G., and Lil' Kim)	Combs; Sean Jacobs; Jason Phillips; David Styles; Wallace; Jones	Puff Daddy; D-Dot	4:38
11.	"Pain"	Combs; Myrick	Puff Daddy; Myrick^{[a]}	5:08
12.	"Is This the End?" (featuring Carl Thomas, Ginuwine, and Twista)	Combs; Thomas; Elgin Lumpkin; Carl Mitchell; Jordan	Puff Daddy; Stevie J^{[b]}	4:34
13.	"I Got the Power" (featuring the LOX)	Combs; Jacobs; Phillips; Styles; Jonathan Burks	Puff Daddy; Big Jaz	4:05
14.	"Friend" (featuring Foxy Brown)	Combs; Inga Marchand; Jordan; Carter	Puff Daddy; Stevie J	6:37
15.	"Señorita"	Combs; Jason Graham	Puff Daddy; Yogi	4:07
16.	"I'll Be Missing You" (featuring Faith Evans and 112)	Combs; Faith Evans; Todd Gaither; Quinnes Parker; Daron Jones; Marvin Scandrick; Michael Keith; Jordan; Sting; Albert E. Brumley; Samuel Barber	Puff Daddy; Stevie J	5:43
17.	"Can't Nobody Hold Me Down" (featuring Mase)	Combs; Betha; Carlos Broady; Myrick	Puff Daddy; July 6; Myrick	3:51
18.	"Been Around the World (Radio Mix)" (featuring the Notorious B.I.G. and Mase)	Combs; Wallace; Mason Betha; Deric Angelettie; Ron Lawrence; David Bowie; Lisa Stansfield; Ian Devaney; Andy Morris	Puff Daddy; D-Dot; Amen-Ra^{[a]}	4:07
Total length:				77:52

Notes

- ^{^[a]} signifies a co-producer
- ^{^[b]} signifies an additional producer
- ^{^[c]} signifies an additional music contribution
- "Señorita" transitions into "I'll Be Missing You"

Sample credits

- "Victory" contains a sample of "Going the Distance" written and performed by Bill Conti.
- "Been Around the World" contains samples of "Let's Dance" written and performed by David Bowie, "Feeling Good" written and performed by Roy Ayers, and an interpolation of "All Around the World" written by Lisa Stansfield, Ian Devaney, and Andy Morris, and performed by Stansfield.
- "What You Gonna Do?" contains samples of "It's Over" written and performed by Eddie Holman.
- "Don't Stop What You're Doing" contains samples of "Don't Stop the Music" written by Jonah Ellis, Alisa Peoples, and Cavin Yarbrough and performed by Yarbrough and Peoples, and "You Haven't Done Nothin'" written and performed by Stevie Wonder.
- "If I Should Die Tonight (Interlude)" contains reworked elements of "If I Should Die Tonight" written by Ed Townsend and Marvin Gaye, and performed by Gaye.
- "Do You Know?" contains samples from "Concentrate" written and performed by the Gaturs, and an interpolation from "Theme from Mahogany (Do You Know Where You're Going To)" written by Michael Masser and Gerald Goffin, and performed by Diana Ross.
- "Young G's" contains samples from "On the Hill" written and performed by Oliver Sain, an interpolation of "Little Ghetto Boy" written and performed by Donny Hathaway, and samples from "Vapors" written by Marcel Hall, Antonio Hardy, and Marlon Williams, and performed by Biz Markie. It also contains a reworked sample from "Unbelievable", written by Christopher Wallace and Christopher Martin, and performed by the Notorious B.I.G.
- "I Love You, Baby" contains samples from "Xtabay (Lure of the Unknown Love)" written and performed by Yma Sumac.
- "It's All About the Benjamins" contains samples from "I Did It For Love" written by Linda Laurie and Terry Etlinger and performed by Love Unlimited. It also contains a reworked sample from "It's Great to Be Here" written by Berry Gordy, Alphonso Mizell, Freddie Perren, and Deke Richards, and performed by the Jackson 5, as well as an interpolation from "Jungle Boogie", written and performed by Kool & the Gang.
- "Pain" contains samples from "Let's Stay Together" written by Al Green and performed by Roberta Flack.
- "Is This the End?" contains samples from "Is This the End" written by Michael Jonzun and Maurice Starr, and performed by New Edition.
- "I Got the Power" contains samples from "Don't Wanna Come Back" written by Joyce Kennedy, Glenn Murdock, Gary Moore, and Jerry Seay, and performed by Mother's Finest.
- "Friend" contains samples from "Person to Person" written and performed by Average White Band.
- "Señorita" contains samples from "Little Lady Maria" written and performed by Ohio Players, and "No Me Conviene" written and performed by La India.
- "I'll Be Missing You" contains samples from "Every Breath You Take" written by Gordon Sumner and performed by the Police, and Adagio for Strings written by Samuel Barber. It also interpolates "I'll Fly Away" written by Albert E. Brumley.
- "Can't Nobody Hold Me Down" contains an interpolation of "Break My Stride" written by Matthew Wilder and Greg Prestopino, and performed by Wilder. It also samples "The Message" written and performed by Grandmaster Flash and the Furious Five, and "Atomic Dog" written by George Clinton, Garry Shider, and David Spradley, and performed by Clinton. The song also contains reworked excerpts from "Big Beat" written and performed by Billy Squier, and samples "Rock with You" written by Rod Temperton and performed by Michael Jackson.

== Personnel ==
Credits for No Way Out adapted from AllMusic.

- Charles "Prince Charles" Alexander – mixing
- Deric "D-Dot" Angelettie – associate executive producer, composer, producer
- Lorrenn Argumendes – assistant engineer
- Michael Benabib – photography
- Carlos "6 July" Broady – producer
- Sean "Puffy" Combs – engineer, mixing, producer, executive producer
- Bill Conti – composer
- Lane Craven – engineer, mixing
- Stephen Dent – engineer, programming
- John Eaton – engineer
- Jay Garfield – producer
- Rasheed Goodlowe – assistant engineer
- J-Dub – producer
- Stevie J. – piano, producer, programming
- Jazz – producer
- Steve Jones – assistant engineer
- S. Jordan – composer
- Michael Lavine – photography
- Ron Lawrence – composer, producer
- Al Machera – engineer
- Tony Maserati – mixing
- John Meredith – assistant engineer
- Lynn Montrose – assistant engineer
- Nasheim Myrick – producer
- Axel Niehaus – engineer
- Michael Patterson – engineer, mixing
- Diana Pedraza – engineer
- Herb Powers – mastering
- Kelly Price – vocals
- Christopher Wallace – executive producer
- Doug Wilson – engineer
- Yogi – producer

== Charts ==
=== Weekly charts ===
Chart (1997)	Peak position
Australian Albums (ARIA)	17
Austrian Albums (Ö3 Austria)	1
Belgian Albums (Ultratop Flanders)	9
Belgian Albums (Ultratop Wallonia)	24
Canadian Albums (Billboard)	1
Dutch Albums (Album Top 100)	6
Estonian Albums (Eesti Top 10)	6
Finnish Albums (Suomen virallinen lista)	9
French Albums (SNEP)	18
German Albums (Offizielle Top 100)	2
Hungarian Albums (MAHASZ)	6
New Zealand Albums (RMNZ)	12
Norwegian Albums (VG-lista)	11
Scottish Albums (Official Charts)	55
Swedish Albums (Sverigetopplistan)	6
Swiss Albums (Schweizer Hitparade)	1
UK Albums (Official Charts)	8
UK R&B Albums (Official Charts)	1
US Billboard 200	1
US Top R&B/Hip-Hop Albums (Billboard)	1

=== Year-end charts ===
Chart (1997)	Position
Australian Albums (ARIA)	99
Austrian Albums (Ö3 Austria)	21
Belgian Albums (Ultratop Flanders)	71
Belgian Albums (Ultratop Wallonia)	74
Canadian Rap Albums (Nielsen Soundscan)	1
Dutch Albums (Album Top 100)	86
European Top 100 Albums (Music & Media)	41
German Albums (Offizielle Top 100)	36
New Zealand Albums (RMNZ)	45
Swedish Albums (Sverigetopplistan)	86
Swiss Albums (Schweizer Hitparade)	21
US Billboard 200	10
US Top R&B/Hip-Hop Albums (Billboard)	5

== Certifications ==
Region	Certification	Certified units/sales
Australia (ARIA)	Gold	35,000^{^}
Austria (IFPI Austria)	Gold	25,000^{*}
Belgium (BRMA)	Gold	25,000^{*}
Canada (Music Canada)	6× Platinum	600,000^{^}
France (SNEP)	Gold	100,000^{*}
Japan (RIAJ)	Platinum	200,000^{^}
Netherlands (NVPI)	Gold	50,000^{^}
New Zealand (RMNZ)	Gold	7,500^{^}
Sweden (GLF)	Gold	40,000^{^}
Switzerland (IFPI Switzerland)	Platinum	50,000^{^}
United Kingdom (BPI)	Gold	100,000^{^}
United States (RIAA)	7× Platinum	7,000,000
Summaries
Europe (IFPI)	Platinum	1,000,000^{*}
^{*} Sales figures based on certification alone.^{^} Shipments figures based on certification alone.

== See also ==
- List of Billboard 200 number-one albums of 1997
- List of Billboard number-one R&B albums of 1997
