= Where I'm From (Jay-Z song) =

1997 song by Jay-Z

Song by Jay-Z

from the album In My Lifetime, Vol. 1
- Released: November 4, 1997
- Studio: Daddy's House (New York)
- Genre: Hip-hop; East Coast hip-hop; Hardcore hip-hop
- Length: 4:25
- Label: Roc-A-Fella; Def Jam
- Songwriters: Shawn "Jay-Z" Carter; Deric "D-Dot" Angelettie; Ron "Amen-Ra" Lawrence; Norman Whitfield
- Producers: Deric "D-Dot" Angelettie; Ron "Amen-Ra" Lawrence

"Where I'm From" is a song by American rapper Jay-Z from his second studio album, In My Lifetime, Vol. 1 (1997). Written by Jay-Z, Deric "D-Dot" Angelettie, and Ron "Amen-Ra" Lawrence, and produced by Angelettie and Lawrence, "Where I'm From" is a hardcore hip-hop track that serves as a vivid autobiographical portrait of Jay-Z's upbringing in the Marcy Projects of Bedford–Stuyvesant, Brooklyn. The song features extensive sampling from Yvonne Fair's 1975 song "Let Your Hair Down" and has itself been widely sampled by other artists.

== Background and recording ==
"Where I'm From" was recorded in 1997 during sessions for Jay-Z's second studio album, In My Lifetime, Vol. 1. At the time, Jay-Z was still establishing himself in the competitive New York hip-hop scene, having released his critically acclaimed debut album Reasonable Doubt the previous year. The song was produced by Deric "D-Dot" Angelettie and Ron "Amen-Ra" Lawrence, who were members of Bad Boy Records' successful Hitmen production team.

The song draws directly from Jay-Z's personal experiences growing up in the Marcy Projects, a 1,705-apartment public housing complex in Bedford–Stuyvesant, Brooklyn. Born Shawn Corey Carter on December 4, 1969, Jay-Z spent his formative years in an environment characterized by gun violence, drug use, and domestic abuse. His father left when he was 11 years old, leaving him to navigate the dangerous streets of the projects on his own. During this period, crack cocaine had become a major threat to low-income areas, and Jay-Z spent time dealing drugs and experiencing the violence that would later inform his music.

== Composition ==
=== Production and music ===
The production style reflects the East Coast hip-hop aesthetic of the late 1990s, with its emphasis on sample-based beats and dark, moody atmospheres. According to a video from producer Amen-Ra, the beat was crafted using the Akai MPC3000 sampler and Roland JV-2080 synthesizer, which were industry-standard tools for hip-hop production in the late 1990s. The main sample came from Yvonne Fair's 1975 soul song "Let Your Hair Down." Billboard critic Brian Josephs described Ron Lawrence's production as featuring "brutally economic clangs" that create a stark, industrial backdrop for Jay-Z's storytelling.

Amen-Ra found the record while crate digging in 1996 and used a section from 0:54 to "give [the beat] a sinister soundtrack feel." The production also incorporates lyrical interpolations from Run-DMC's "Rock Box," the Notorious B.I.G.'s "Me & My Bitch," and Puff Daddy, Jay-Z, Biggie, and Kelly Price's "Young G's."

Producer Amen-Ra recalled that Jay-Z would "listen to the track and pace back-and-forth in the studio... Never once did he pick up a pen to write lyrics. He would memorize four lines in his head at one time, go into the booth, knock out the lyric, and then come back to the control room to listen to it."

== Critical reception ==
The track has been consistently ranked among Jay-Z's best songs by various publications and critics. In 2010, Rolling Stone included "Where I'm From" in their list of Jay-Z's 50 Greatest Songs, describing it as "one of his most vivid and powerful tracks." The publication noted how the song "paints a picture of life in the projects that's both unflinching and deeply personal." In 2019, Billboard included the track in their list of "Jay-Z's Top 25 Deep Cuts," with critic Brian Josephs describing it as "one of the most vivid depictions of black life under duress ever recorded." Josephs noted that the song creates "a physical and claustrophobic experience" where "the shell casings, police storming out of vans, and pooling blood rushes toward you as Hov delivers the scenes."

== Live performances ==
"Where I'm From" has been a staple in Jay-Z's live performances since its release. According to concert statistics from setlist.fm, "Where I'm From" is Jay-Z's 21st most performed song in concert, with 53 documented live performances.

=== Made in America Festival 2012 ===
15 years after its release, "Where I'm From" was performed at the inaugural Made in America Festival in Philadelphia on September 1–2, 2012. Jay-Z, who founded and headlined the festival, included the track in his setlist.

=== 4:44 Tour (2017) ===
The song gained renewed prominence during Jay-Z's 4:44 Tour in 2017, which occurred just after Kanye West's "Saint Pablo" (2016) had sampled "Where I'm From." This tour prominently featured "Where I'm From" in the setlist.

== Cultural impact and legacy ==
"Where I'm From" has been widely sampled by other artists.

The track has been sampled or interpolated in over 20 songs by various artists, including:

- Kanye West's "Saint Pablo" (2016)
- Big Sean's "Control" featuring Kendrick Lamar and Jay Electronica (2013)
- J. Cole's "The Last Stretch" (2010)
- 50 Cent's "I'm a Hustler" (2000)

In Jay-Z's 2010 memoir Decoded, he provides detailed explanations of many of the song's lyrics, offering readers insight into the specific experiences and locations that inspired various lines. The song's depiction of the Marcy Projects remains relevant decades later, as the housing complex continues to face many of the same challenges described in the track. According to contemporary reports, gun violence and domestic abuse remain prominent issues in the neighborhood, with tenants often living in fear.

== Personnel ==
Credits are adapted from the liner notes of In My Lifetime, Vol. 1.

- Jay-Z – vocals, songwriting
- Deric "D-Dot" Angelettie – production, songwriting
- Ron "Amen-Ra" Lawrence – production, songwriting
- Norman Whitfield – songwriting (sampled material)

== Samples ==
"Where I'm From" contains a sample from the following song:

- "Let Your Hair Down" by Yvonne Fair (1975)
