= Victory (Puff Daddy song) =

1998 single by Puff Daddy featuring the Notorious B.I.G. and Busta Rhymes

Single by Puff Daddy featuring the Notorious B.I.G. and Busta Rhymes

from the album No Way Out
- B-side: "Bad Boy's Been Around the World (remix)"
- Released: March 17th, 1998
- Recorded: March 8th, 1997
- Genre: East Coast hip-hop; mafioso rap
- Length: 4:55
- Label: Bad Boy; Arista
- Songwriters: Jason Phillips; Christopher Wallace; Trevor Smith
- Producers: Sean "Puffy" Combs; Stevie J

Puff Daddy singles chronology
"Nothin' Move But the Money" (1998)	"Victory" (1998)	"Come with Me" (1998)

The Notorious B.I.G. singles chronology
"Sky's the Limit" / "Going Back to Cali" (1997)	"Victory" (1998)	"Dead Wrong" (1999)

Busta Rhymes singles chronology
"Curious" (1998)	"Victory" (1998)	"Turn It Up (Remix) / Fire It Up" (1998)

"Victory" is a song by American rapper Puff Daddy. The song features vocals from rappers such as the Notorious B.I.G. and Busta Rhymes. It features heavy use of mafioso-style lyrics, as was popular at the time. The song also heavily sampled the Bill Conti song "Going the Distance", which featured on the soundtrack to the movie Rocky making it a darker start to a rap album that featured many (at the time) club-standard singles. It also featured the last verses recorded by The Notorious B.I.G. before his 1997 death, as these verses were recorded a day before his shooting. Released as the fifth and final single from No Way Out in March 1998, it peaked at number 19 on the Billboard Hot 100 chart, and was certified gold by the RIAA later that year.

== Music video ==
Released on March 31, 1998, the music video for the song was directed by Marcus Nispel (although he was supposed to remain anonymous at the time of the premiere) and is an homage to The Running Man. The almost eight-minute-long video featured cameos from Dennis Hopper as a New World Order dictator ("President Victor Castiglione") and Danny DeVito as a live action reporter. English socialites Tamara Beckwith and Tara Palmer-Tomkinson were also in the video. Hopper and DeVito reportedly appeared in the video pro bono as a favor to Combs.

Sean Combs' character (known as "Contestant #5" or codename "PD") runs through the dark streets of the year 3002 AD, chased by armed gestapo-esque forces of Chase TV. At one point, Contestant #5 is cornered on a rooftop, where he decides to leap off instead of submitting to the armed troops.

Footage from Biggie's "One More Chance" video was used in "ghost" images, representing flashbacks for Combs' character. Busta Rhymes, dressed in black feathers, raps atop a statue representing Victoria, the goddess of victory. The Victoria statue overlooks the chase scenes. Biggie appears in the video only through archive footage due to his death a year earlier.

The production costs ran upwards of $2,700,000. It is listed as one of the most expensive music videos ever made.

== Remixes and freestyles ==
- In 2002, 50 Cent and Lloyd Banks freestyled over the instrumental for their mixtape, No Mercy, No Fear, which Diddy used a year later as the official remix, "Victory 2004", for Bad Boy's 10th Anniversary... The Hits album. This remix also has a new verse from P. Diddy.
- In 2002, Mike Jones freestyled over the instrumental for Swishahouse's Before Da Kappa 2K2 mixtape.
- In 2003, while not remixed, the song was used as the main theme in EA Sports Fight Night 2004.
- In 2009, there was an unofficial remix leaked that featured 50 Cent, Lloyd Banks, Diddy, Busta Rhymes, The Notorious B.I.G., and also features Jay-Z rapping over Diddy's first lines.
- In 2010, another unofficial remix titled "Legends" leaked which featured Diddy, 50 Cent, 2Pac and an unknown artist. The original "Victory" beat was replaced with a motivational-emotional Piano and String instrumental.
- In 2010, British rapper Lowkey used the instrumental for his diss track The Warning which was aimed at Chip. The freestyle was a result of an altercation on Twitter between the pair.
- In 2019, Shaquille O'Neal made a diss track against Damian Lillard called Second Round Knockout. Victory was used as a sample song.
- In 2025, Kanye West and Ty Dolla $ign covered this song at the beginning of their song "Wheels Fall Off" (formerly titled "WFO-01") featuring Diddy's son, King Combs.

== Track listing ==
Victory (Remixes)

1. Victory (Album Version) (4:58)
2. Victory (Nine Inch Nails Remix) (5:33)

- Producer, Featuring - Trent Reznor
- Remix - Nine Inch Nails

3. Victory (Drama Mix) (4:58)

- Vocals - Ron Grant, Terri Hawkins

4. Bad Boy's "Been Around The World" (Remix) (5:30)

- Co-remix - Jay Garfield Additional Production By: Jesse Wilson
- Featuring - Mase
- Producer - Deric "D-Dot" Angelettie, Ron "Amen-Ra" Lawrence
- Remix - Nashiem Myrick
- Vocals - Carl Thomas

== Charts ==
=== Weekly charts ===
Chart (1998)	Peak position
US Billboard Hot 100	19
US Hot R&B/Hip-Hop Songs (Billboard)	13
US Hot Rap Songs (Billboard)	2

=== Year-end charts ===
Chart (1998)	Position
US Billboard Hot 100	68
US Hot R&B/Hip-Hop Songs (Billboard)	49

== Certifications ==
Region	Certification	Certified units/sales
United States (RIAA)	Gold	700,000
