= Life After Death =

Studio album by The Notorious B.I.G.
- Released: March 25, 1997
- Recorded: 1995–1997
- Studios: Daddy's House Recording Studios (New York City); Caribbean Sound Basin (Trinidad, West Indies)
- Genres: East Coast hip-hop; gangsta rap; mafioso rap; hardcore hip-hop
- Length: 120:39; 59:42 (censored version)
- Labels: Bad Boy; Arista
- Producers: Sean "Puffy" Combs (exec.); Mark Pitts (also exec.); The Notorious B.I.G.; The Hitmen; Buckwild; Clark Kent; DJ Premier; Easy Mo Bee; Havoc; Daron Jones; KayGee; RZA

The Notorious B.I.G. chronology
Ready to Die (1994)	Life After Death (1997)	Born Again (1999)

Singles from Life After Death
- 1. "Hypnotize" Released: March 4, 1997; 2. "Mo Money Mo Problems" Released: July 5, 1997; 3. "Sky's the Limit" / "Going Back to Cali" Released: November 18, 1997

Life After Death is the second and final studio album by American rapper the Notorious B.I.G., released on March 25, 1997, by Bad Boy Records and distributed by Arista Records. A double album, it was released sixteen days after his murder. It features collaborations with guest artists such as 112, Jay-Z, Lil' Kim, Mase, R. Kelly, The Lox, Angela Winbush, Darryl McDaniels of Run-DMC, Bone Thugs-n-Harmony, Too Short, and Puff Daddy. Life After Death exhibits the Notorious B.I.G. further delving into the mafioso rap subgenre. The album is a sequel to his first album, Ready to Die, and picks up where the last song, "Suicidal Thoughts", ends.

Life After Death sold 690,000 copies in its first week, peaking at No. 1 on the Billboard 200. It received widespread critical acclaim upon release and was nominated for Best Rap Album, Best Rap Solo Performance for its first single "Hypnotize", and Best Rap Performance by a Duo or Group for its second single "Mo Money Mo Problems" at the 40th Annual Grammy Awards. The album is widely considered to be one of the greatest hip hop albums of all time. In 2020, it was ranked at No. 179 on Rolling Stone magazine's list of the 500 Greatest Albums of All Time.

== Background ==
Two and a half years before the album's release, the Notorious B.I.G., who had married Faith Evans, became East Coast's icon in the East Coast–West Coast hip hop rivalry and featured on albums by Michael Jackson and R. Kelly amongst others. The album had numerous planned release dates, but Biggie was involved in a car accident in September 1996 that delayed the finalizing of the album. It was pushed back to 1997.

As he explained on BET's Rap City, Biggie aimed to reach a wider audience with Life After Death, collaborating with a wider variety of artists than on his debut. In addition to Bad Boy labelmates Mase, the LOX and 112, and label owner Puff Daddy, guests include Jay-Z, Angela Winbush, Too Short, Lil Kim, and Bone Thugs-n-Harmony. A record with Bay Area rapper E-40 was not included on the final track listing.

"Most artists, you can tell they're working by the movement of their pen, but Big didn't have a pen and paper. So if a person walked in, they'd think there wasn't any work being done. There'd be conversations going on, the music would be blaring, there'd be smoke in the air, drinks all over the place, girls running around. You would think that a party was going on, but meanwhile Big was sitting in his little corner, just nodding." – Deric 'D-Dot' Angelettie

Production was handled by DJ Premier, Easy Mo Bee, Havoc, Buckwild, RZA, Clark Kent and members of Bad Boy's in-house production team, the Hitmen. Q-Tip submitted a beat, which Biggie enjoyed; however, the album had already been completed and turned into Bad Boy. The beat was later used for A Tribe Called Quest's song "The Love", from their 1998 album The Love Movement.

In 1995, during production on Life After Death, Notorious B.I.G. contacted in-house Bad Boy producer Rashad Smith to create two tracks built around the samples of Al B. Sure's "Nite and Day" and Grace Jones' 1983 song "My Jamaican Guy". Smith completed the productions and B.I.G. approved of the tracks; however, the album's budget had not yet been approved by Arista Records, and Smith did not receive payment as expected. Around this time, Chris Lighty, a Def Jam executive overseeing LL Cool J's sixth studio album, Mr. Smith, called Smith to his office to hear some of his beats. During the session, the tracks intended for B.I.G. were played, and Lighty immediately requested them for LL Cool J, offering double the original price. Smith agreed, and the beats became "Loungin" and "Doin' It" for Mr. Smith. This decision caused a falling out between B.I.G. and Smith, leaving him off of Life After Death.

Biggie traveled to the West Coast in February 1997 to promote the album, and shoot the video for the lead single, "Hypnotize." Two weeks before its release, on March 9, he was shot four times in a drive-by shooting and later pronounced dead at Cedars-Sinai Medical Center in Los Angeles.

== Critical reception ==
1997 professional reviews
Review scores
Source	Rating
Entertainment Weekly	C+
The Guardian	4/5 stars
Los Angeles Times	4/4 stars
NME	8/10
Rolling Stone	3.5/5 stars
The Source	5/5 stars
USA Today	3.5/4 stars

Life After Death received widespread acclaim from critics upon release. Jon Pareles of The New York Times described the album as "flaunting affluence with a leisurely swagger, midtempo grooves and calmly arrogant raps". Anthony DeCurtis of Rolling Stone magazine called it a "conscious continuation of Ready to Die", and stated "Life After Death captures crime's undeniable glamour but doesn't stint on the fear, desperation and irretrievable loss that the streets inevitably exact". Cheo Hodari Coker from the Los Angeles Times wrote that "Life After Death reflects both the dark and the heartfelt sides of the rapper's Gemini personality. It's not only a complex testament to who he was in his private life, but also a demonstration of his amazing rhyming ability. In key moments, B.I.G. does a marvelous job of surfing between accessible music fare tailored for the radio, and more challenging material that will be savored by hard-core rap fans who have long admired B.I.G.'s microphone skills. Rarely has a rapper attempted to please so many different audiences and done it so brilliantly". In a five-mic review for The Source, Michael A. Gonzales felt that it would "undoubtedly become a classic to any true hip-hop fan". Although David Browne of Entertainment Weekly was unfavorable of the album's long length, and some of its violent and materialistic content, he commended Notorious B.I.G.'s "bicoastal respect" by working with other hip-hop styles and artists from other regions of the United States.

=== Retrospect ===
Retrospective professional reviews
Review scores
Source	Rating
AllMusic	4.5/5 stars
Christgau's Consumer Guide	A
Encyclopedia of Popular Music	4/5 stars
HipHopDX	4/5 stars
Pitchfork	9.5/10
The Rolling Stone Album Guide	5/5 stars
XXL	5/5

Since its release, Life After Death has received retrospective acclaim from critics. Rob Sheffield, writing in The Rolling Stone Album Guide (2004), called it "a filler-free two-disc rush of musical bravado" and commented that the Notorious B.I.G.'s voice and lyrics were "deeper" than before. AllMusic's Jason Birchmeier wrote, "It may have taken the Notorious B.I.G. a few years to follow up his milestone debut, Ready to Die, with another album, but when he did return with Life After Death, he did so in a huge way. The ambitious album, intended as somewhat of a sequel to Ready to Die, picked up where its predecessor left off." Birchmeier further said, "Over the course of only two albums, he achieved every success imaginable, perhaps none greater than this unabashedly over-reaching success." Evan McGarvey of Stylus magazine wrote in his review, "Life After Death is a grand exercise in personal mythology, narrative sweep, and truly diverse, universal pop excellence. As a double album it is the very definition of cinematic; it essentially perfected the concept and standard in hip-hop ... Sequenced as an unpacking of sorts, the album's progression from song to song is an essay itself." In 2013, VIBE named Life After Death the greatest Hip-Hop/R&B album since 1993.

=== Accolades ===
- (*) signifies unordered lists

Publication	Country	Accolade	Year	Rank	Ref.
About.com	United States	100 Greatest Hip Hop Albums	2008	40	
About.com	United States	Best Rap Albums of 1997	2008	1	
Addicted to Noise	United States	Albums of the Year	1997	7	
Blender	United States	The 100 Greatest American Albums of All Time	2002	25	
Ego Trip	United States	Hip Hop's 25 Greatest Albums by Year 1980–1998	1999	1	
The Face	United Kingdom	Albums of the Year	1997	20	
Fnac	France	The 1000 Best Albums of All Time	2008	858	
Hip Hop Connection	United Kingdom	The 100 Greatest Rap Albums 1995–2005	2006	14	
The New Nation	United Kingdom	Top 100 Albums by Black Artists	2005	60	
OOR Moordlijst	Netherlands	Albums of the Year	1997	87	
Pure Pop	Mexico	Albums of the Year	1997	18	
Q	United Kingdom	Albums of the Year	1997	*	
Rolling Stone	United States	500 Greatest Albums of All Time	2003	483	
Rolling Stone	United States	500 Greatest Albums of All Time	2012	476	
Rolling Stone	United States	500 Greatest Albums of All Time	2020	179	
Rolling Stone	United States	100 Best Albums of the '90s	2010	66	
Rolling Stone	United States	The Essential Recordings of the '90s	1999	*	
The Source	United States	The 100 Best Rap Albums of All Time	1998	*	
Spex	Germany	Albums of the Year	1997	19	
Spin	United States	Albums of the Year	1997	7	
(various writers)	United States	50 Years of Great Recordings	2006	*	
Vibe	United States	51 Essential Albums	2004	*	
Vibe	United States	150 Albums That Define the Vibe Era (1992–2007)	2007	*	
Village Voice	United States	Pazz & Jop	1997	13	

== Commercial performance ==
Life After Death was released to a significant amount of critical praise and commercial success. The album sold 690,000 copies in its first week. In 2000, the album was certified Diamond by the Recording Industry Association of America (RIAA), denoting shipment of 10 million copies (the threshold for double albums) and it has been credited as one of the best-selling rap albums of all time. It also made the largest jump to number one on the Billboard 200 chart in history, jumping from number 176 to number one in one week. Also, it spent four weeks at number one on the Billboard Top R&B/Hip-Hop Albums chart and ended up as the top album on the Billboard Year-End chart for the Top R&B/Hip-Hop Albums chart in 1997.

It spent its four consecutive weeks at number one on the Billboard 200 from the weeks of April 12 to May 3, 1997, later being displaced from the top entry by singer Mary J. Blige's third studio album, Share My World, which released on April 22.

== Legacy and influence ==
Although released in the wake of B.I.G.'s fatal shooting, Life After Death signaled a stylistic change in gangsta rap as it crossed to the commercial mainstream. After Life After Death, Puff Daddy's Bad Boy Records continued to bring pop and gangsta rap closer together: the references to violence and drug dealing remained, as did the "gangsta" rhetoric, but the previously dark production changed to a cleaner, sample-heavy, more upbeat sound that was fashioned for the pop charts, as seen in the single "Mo Money Mo Problems". The Notorious B.I.G. is often credited with initiating this transition, as he was among the first mainstream rappers to produce albums with a calculated attempt to include both gritty and realistic gangsta narratives as well as radio-friendly productions.

"It sounded for the first time like an East Coast artist had been able to make the perfect record. It was a pop record, a radio record, a street record, a club record. It embodied every type of song that a hip-hop artist could make – would wish to make, would try to make – in one project. His death magnified the meaning, but ultimately the finished product was super-substantial." – Busta Rhymes

The majority of the album was produced by Steven "Stevie J" Jordan, Deric "D-Dot" Angelettie, Carlos "July Six" Broady, Ron Lawrence, and Nashiem Myrick. However, notable hip-hop producers such as Easy Mo Bee, DJ Premier, Havoc from Mobb Deep, and RZA from Wu-Tang Clan contributed beats.

Various artists were specifically influenced by songs on Life After Death. Evidence's "Down in New York City" is essentially "Going Back to Cali" from the perspective of a West Coast hip hop artist. Jay-Z borrows four bars from "The World Is Filled..." in his song "I Just Wanna Love U (Give It 2 Me)", as well as the chorus from his song "Squeeze first" from "Hypnotize", a line in "The Ruler's Back" from "Kick in the Door" and "You're Nobody ('Til Somebody Kills You)" on "D.O.A. (Death of Auto-Tune)". Ice Cube borrows the chorus from "Kick in the Door" for his song "Child Support". As with B.I.G.'s "I Love the Dough" Monica's 2010 song "Everything to Me" samples "I Love You More" by René & Angela. The official remix includes a verse from B.I.G. that originally appeared on "I Love the Dough". SWV sampled "Ten Crack Commandments" on the opening track "Someone" featuring B.I.G.'s former protege and friend Puff Daddy. The French rapper Rohff named his album "La Vie Avant La Mort" (Life Before Death) (2001) as a tribute to B.I.G, Joey Badass interpolated the lines 'Kick in the Door' on "Super Predator" from All-Amerikkkan Badass (2017).

== Track listing ==
Credits adapted from Life After Death liner notes.

Disc one
No.	Title	Writer(s)	Producer(s)	Length
1.	"Life After Death Intro"	Christopher Wallace; Sean Combs; Steven Jordan	Sean "Puffy" Combs; Stevie J.; The Notorious B.I.G.^{[a]}	1:39
2.	"Somebody's Gotta Die"	Wallace; Combs; Nashiem Myrick; Carlos Broady; Anthony Hester	Myrick; Carlos "July Six" Broady; Combs	4:26
3.	"Hypnotize"	Wallace; Combs; Deric Angelettie; Ron Lawrence; Andy Armer; Randy Alpert; Ricky Walters; Douglas Davis	Deric "D-Dot" Angelettie; Ron Lawrence; Combs	3:50
4.	"Kick in the Door"	Wallace; Jalacy Hawkins; Christopher Martin	DJ Premier	4:47
5.	"#!*@ You Tonight" (featuring R. Kelly)	Wallace; Combs; Daron Jones; Robert Kelly	Jones; Combs	5:45
6.	"Last Day" (featuring the Lox)	Wallace; Combs; Jason Phillips; David Styles; Kejuan Muchita	Havoc; Combs^{[a]}; Stevie J.^{[a]}	4:19
7.	"I Love the Dough" (featuring Jay-Z and Angela Winbush)	Wallace; Osten Harvey; Angela Winbush; René Moore; Shawn Carter	Easy Mo Bee	5:11
8.	"What's Beef?"	Wallace; Myrick; Broady; Combs; Burt Bacharach; Hal David	Broady; Myrick; Paragon^{[a]}	5:15
9.	"B.I.G. Interlude"	Wallace; Angelettie	B.I.G.; Angelettie	0:48
10.	"Mo Money Mo Problems" (featuring Mase, Puff Daddy, and Kelly Price)	Wallace; Jordan; Combs; Mason Betha; Bernard Edwards; Nile Rodgers	Combs; Stevie J	4:17
11.	"Niggas Bleed"	Wallace; Myrick; Combs; Jordan; Broady	Myrick; Broady; Combs; Stevie J.	4:51
12.	"I Got a Story to Tell"	Wallace; Combs; Carl Thompson; Anthony Best	Buckwild; Chucky Thompson^{[a]}; Combs^{[a]}	4:42
Total length:				49:50

Reissue bonus track
No.	Title	Length
13.	"Interview / Biggie Speaks" (unlisted track)	11:28
Total length:		61:18

Disc two
No.	Title	Writer(s)	Producer(s)	Length
1.	"Notorious Thugs" (featuring Bone Thugs-n-Harmony)	Wallace; Combs; Jordan; Steven Howse; Anthony Henderson; Bryon McCane	Stevie J.; Combs	6:07
2.	"Miss U" (featuring 112)	Wallace; Keir Gist; Lionel Richie; Darren Lighty	KayGee	4:58
3.	"Another" (featuring Lil' Kim)	Wallace; Combs; Jordan; Kimberly Jones; Barbara Mason; Norman Ingram; Stanley Gelber	Combs; Stevie J.	4:15
4.	"Going Back to Cali"	Wallace; Harvey; Roger Troutman	Easy Mo Bee	5:07
5.	"Ten Crack Commandments"	Wallace; Martin; Khary Turner	DJ Premier	3:24
6.	"Playa Hater"	Wallace; Combs; Jordan; Wilbert Hart	Combs; Stevie J.	3:57
7.	"Nasty Boy"	Wallace; Combs; Jordan	Combs; Stevie J.	5:34
8.	"Sky's the Limit" (featuring 112)	Wallace; Combs; Rodolfo Franklin; Robert Caldwell; Hubert Eaves; James Williams	Clark Kent	5:29
9.	"The World Is Filled..." (featuring Too Short, Puff Daddy, and Carl Thomas)	Wallace; Angelettie; Combs; Betha; Kitt Walker; Todd Shaw; Asha Goldschmidt	Angelettie; Combs	4:54
10.	"My Downfall" (featuring D.M.C.)	Wallace; Myrick; Broady; Combs; Darryl McDaniels	Broady; Myrick; Combs	5:26
11.	"Long Kiss Goodnight"	Wallace; Robert Diggs	RZA	5:18
12.	"You're Nobody (Til Somebody Kills You)"	Wallace; Combs; Jordan; Billy Preston; Ephrem Lopez; George Johnson; Jean Louhisdon	Combs; Stevie J.; DJ Enuff^{[a]}; Jiv Poss^{[a]}	4:52
Total length:				59:21

Clean edition
No.	Title	Length
1.	"Hypnotize"	3:57
2.	"Notorious Thugs"	6:14
3.	"I Love the Dough" (featuring Jay-Z and Angela Winbush)	5:40
4.	"B.I.G. Interlude"	0:48
5.	"Miss U"	4:05
6.	"Mo Money Mo Problems" (featuring Mase and Puff Daddy)	4:17
7.	"Playa Hater"	3:59
8.	"Another" (featuring Lil' Kim)	4:22
9.	"Ten Commandments"	3:24
10.	"Nasty Boy"	3:51
11.	"Sky's the Limit" (featuring 112)	4:37
12.	"Going Back to Cali"	3:55
13.	"You're Nobody (Til Somebody Kills You)"	4:52
14.	"Lovin' You Tonight" (featuring R. Kelly)	5:42
Total length:		59:42

Disc one notes

- ^{^[a]} – co-producer
- "Life After Death Intro" contains sample of "Suicidal Thoughts" by the Notorious B.I.G., and "This Masquerade" by George Benson.
- "Somebody's Gotta Die" contains a sample of "In the Rain" by the Dramatics.
- "Hypnotize" contains a sample of "Rise" by Herb Alpert, and an interpolation of "La Di Da Di" by Slick Rick and Doug E. Fresh.
- "Kick in the Door" contains a sample of "I Put a Spell on You" by Screamin' Jay Hawkins, "Unbelievable" by the Notorious B.I.G., interpolations of "Get Money" by Junior M.A.F.I.A., "Wash Yo Ass" by Martin Lawrence, and "Robby, the Cook, and 60 Gallons of Booze" by Louis and Bebe Barron.
- "I Love the Dough" contains a sample and an interpolation of "I Love You More" by René & Angela, and "Da Ya Think I'm Sexy?" by Rod Stewart.
- "What's Beef?" contains a sample of "I'm Glad You're Mine" by Al Green and "Close to You" by Richard Evans.
- "B.I.G. Interlude" contains a sample of "P.S.K. What Does It Mean?" by Schooly D.
- "Mo Money Mo Problems" contains a sample of "I'm Coming Out" by Diana Ross.
- "Niggas Bleed" contains a sample of "Hey, Who Really Cares" by the Whispers.
- "I Got a Story to Tell" contains a sample of "I'm Glad You're Mine" by Al Green.

Disc two notes

- "Notorious Thugs" contains a sample of "More Than Love" by Ohio Players.
- "Miss U" contains an interpolation of "Missing You" by Diana Ross.
- "Another" contains a sample and interpolation of "Another Man" by Barbara Mason.
- "Going Back to Cali" contains a sample of "More Bounce to the Ounce" by Zapp.
- "Ten Crack Commandments" contains samples of "Vallarta" by Les McCann, and "Shut 'Em Down" by Public Enemy.
- "Playa Hater" contains a sample and interpolation (and is a parody) of "Hey Love" by the Delfonics.
- "Nasty Boy" contains a sample of "Cavern" by Liquid Liquid.
- "Sky's the Limit" contains a sample of "My Flame" by Bobby Caldwell.
- "The World Is Filled..." contains a sample of "Space Talk" by Asha Puthli, and "The What" by the Notorious B.I.G.
- "My Downfall" contains a sample of "For the Good Times" by Al Green and an interpolation of "You're All I Need to Get By" by Marvin Gaye and Tammi Terrell.
- "Long Kiss Goodnight" contains a sample of "The Letter" by Al Green.

== Personnel ==
=== Performers ===
- Notorious B.I.G. – writer, rap performer, additional production
- Sean "Puffy" Combs – featured rap performer
- Lil' Kim – featured rap performer
- Jay-Z – featured rap performer
- Too Short – featured rap performer
- Mase – featured rap performer
- Bizzy Bone – featured rap performer
- Krayzie Bone – featured rap performer
- Layzie Bone – featured rap performer
- Jadakiss – featured rap performer
- Styles P – featured rap performer
- Sheek Louch – featured rap performer
- 112 – featured vocals
- R. Kelly – featured vocals
- DMC – featured vocals
- Angela Winbush – featured vocals
- Kelly Price – vocals
- Pamela Long – additional vocals
- Carl Thomas – additional vocals
- Faith Evans – background vocals
- Karen Anderson – background vocals
- Keanna Henson – background vocals
- Deborah Neeley Rolle – background vocals
- Ron Grant – background vocals
- Michael Ciro – guitar
- Butch Ingram – writer/publisher

=== Production ===
- Sean "Puffy" Combs – producer, mixing
- Carlos "6 July" Broady – producer, hammond organ
- Deric "D-Dot" Angelettie – producer
- Stevie J – producer
- Nashiem Myrick – producer
- Ron Lawrence – producer
- Easy Mo Bee – producer
- DJ Premier – producer
- Clark Kent – producer
- RZA – producer
- Havoc – producer
- Buckwild – producer
- Kay Gee – editor, producer
- Chucky Thompson – producer
- DJ Enuff – producer
- Daron Jones – producer
- Paragon – producer
- Jiv Pos – producer
- Mike Pitts – assistant producer, editor
- Michael Patterson – engineer, mixing
- Charles "Prince Charles" Alexander – engineer, mixing
- Lane Craven – engineer, mixing
- Manny Marroquin – engineer
- Camilo Argumedes – engineer
- Stephen Dent – engineer
- Ben Garrison – engineer
- Rasheed Goodlowe – engineer
- Steve Jones – engineer
- Rich July – engineer
- John Meredith – engineer
- Lynn Montrose – engineer
- Axel Niehaus – engineer
- Diana Pedraza – engineer
- Doug Wilson – engineer
- Tony Maserati – mixing
- Paul Logus – mixing
- Eddie Sancho – mixing
- Richard Travali – mixing
- Herb Powers – mastering

== Charts ==
=== Weekly charts ===
Chart (1997)	Peak position
Australian Albums (ARIA)	59
Belgian Albums (Ultratop Flanders)	30
Canadian Albums (Billboard)	3
Dutch Albums (Album Top 100)	16
German Albums (Offizielle Top 100)	63
New Zealand Albums (RMNZ)	28
Swedish Albums (Sverigetopplistan)	30
UK Albums (Official Charts)	23
UK R&B Albums (Official Charts)	2
US Billboard 200	1
US Top R&B/Hip-Hop Albums (Billboard)	1

Chart (2022)	Peak position
Hungarian Albums (MAHASZ)	19

Chart (2026)	Peak position
Greek Albums (IFPI)	72

=== Year-end charts ===
Chart (1997)	Position
Canadian Albums Chart (Nielsen Soundscan)	49
US Billboard 200	8
US Top R&B/Hip-Hop Albums (Billboard)	1

Chart (1998)	Position
US Billboard 200	112
US Top R&B/Hip-Hop Albums (Billboard)	79

=== Decade-end charts ===
Chart (1990–1999)	Position
US Billboard 200	96

== Certifications ==
Region	Certification	Certified units/sales
Canada (Music Canada)	2× Platinum	200,000^{^}
Denmark (IFPI Danmark)	Gold	10,000^{‡}
United Kingdom (BPI)	Platinum	300,000^{*}
United States (RIAA)	11× Platinum	5,360,000
^{*} Sales figures based on certification alone.^{^} Shipments figures based on certification alone.^{‡} Sales+streaming figures based on certification alone.

== See also ==
- List of best-selling albums in the United States
- List of number-one albums of 1997 (U.S.)
- List of number-one R&B albums of 1997 (U.S.)
- Billboard Year-End
