= List of Billboard 200 number-one albums of 1997 =

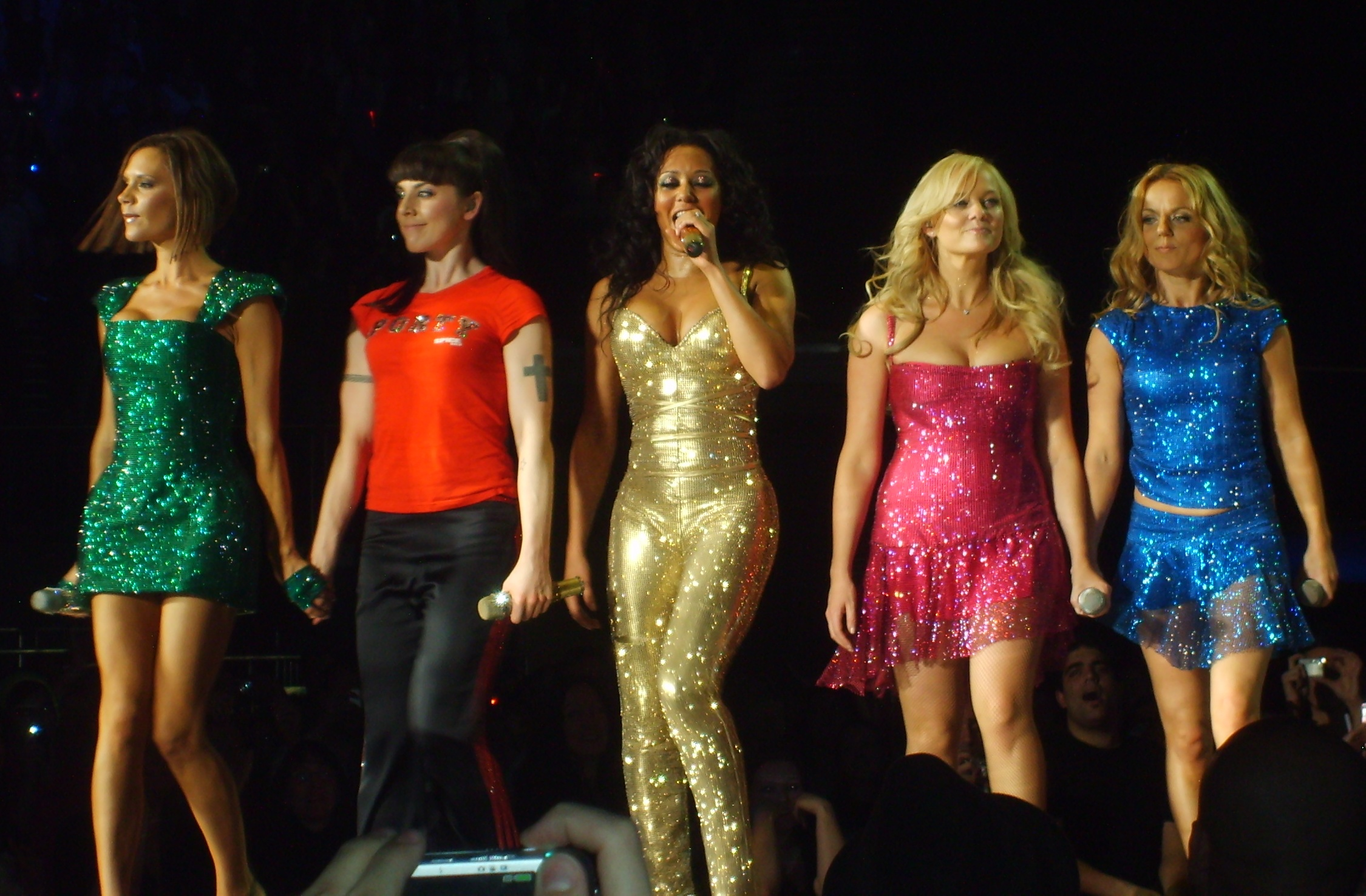
Spice by the Spice Girls was the best-selling album of 1997.

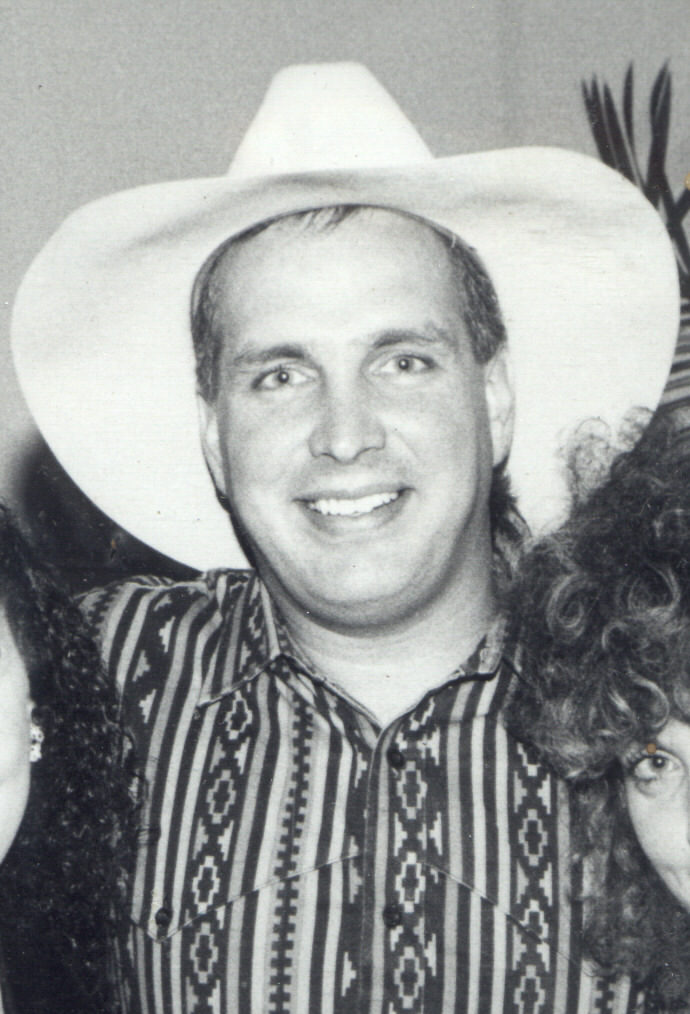
Sevens by Garth Brooks had the biggest sales week of 1997, selling almost 900,000 copies in a single week.

These are the Billboard magazine number-one albums of 1997, per the Billboard 200.

== Chart history ==
Key
†	Indicates best performing album of 1997

Issue date	Album	Artist(s)	Label	Sales	Ref.
January 4	Tragic Kingdom	No Doubt	Trauma	484,500	
January 11	Tragic Kingdom	No Doubt	Trauma	506,000	
January 18	Tragic Kingdom	No Doubt	Trauma	251,000	
January 25	Tragic Kingdom	No Doubt	Trauma	155,500	
February 1	Tragic Kingdom	No Doubt	Trauma	143,000	
February 8	Tragic Kingdom	No Doubt	Trauma	144,000	
February 15	Gridlock'd	Soundtrack	Death Row	150,000	
February 22	Tragic Kingdom	No Doubt	Trauma	119,000	
March 1	Unchained Melody: The Early Years	LeAnn Rimes	Curb	166,000	
March 8	Secret Samadhi	Live	Radioactive	227,000	
March 15	Howard Stern Private Parts – The Album	Soundtrack	Warner Bros.	177,590	
March 22	Pop	U2	Island	349,000	
March 29	The Untouchable	Scarface	Rap-A-Lot	168,000	
April 5	Nine Lives	Aerosmith	Columbia	139,000	
April 12	Life After Death	The Notorious B.I.G.	Bad Boy	689,535	
April 19	Life After Death	The Notorious B.I.G.	Bad Boy	307,000	
April 26	Life After Death	The Notorious B.I.G.	Bad Boy	197,000	
May 3	Life After Death	The Notorious B.I.G.	Bad Boy	165,000	
May 10	Share My World	Mary J. Blige	MCA	240,000	
May 17	Carrying Your Love with Me	George Strait	MCA	178,000	
May 24	Spice †	Spice Girls	Virgin	138,000	
May 31	Spice †	Spice Girls	Virgin	134,000	
June 7	Spice †	Spice Girls	Virgin	136,000	
June 14	Spice †	Spice Girls	Virgin	137,000	
June 21	Wu-Tang Forever	Wu-Tang Clan	Loud	612,069	
June 28	Butterfly Kisses (Shades of Grace)	Bob Carlisle	Jive	233,000	
July 5	Butterfly Kisses (Shades of Grace)	Bob Carlisle	Jive	123,000	
July 12	Spice †	Spice Girls	Virgin	123,000	
July 19	The Fat of the Land	The Prodigy	Maverick	201,000	
July 26	Men in Black: The Album	Soundtrack	Columbia	178,000	
August 2	Men in Black: The Album	Soundtrack	Columbia	168,000	
August 9	No Way Out	Puff Daddy and the Family	Bad Boy	560,862	
August 16	The Art of War	Bone Thugs-n-Harmony	Ruthless	394,000	
August 23	No Way Out	Puff Daddy and the Family	Bad Boy	228,000	
August 30	No Way Out	Puff Daddy and the Family	Bad Boy	186,000	
September 6	The Dance	Fleetwood Mac	Reprise	199,000	
September 13	No Way Out	Puff Daddy and the Family	Bad Boy	153,000	
September 20	Ghetto D	Master P	No Limit	260,000	
September 27	You Light Up My Life: Inspirational Songs	LeAnn Rimes	Curb	186,000	
October 4	Butterfly	Mariah Carey	Columbia	235,000	
October 11	Evolution	Boyz II Men	Motown	211,000	
October 18	You Light Up My Life: Inspirational Songs	LeAnn Rimes	Curb	175,000	
October 25	The Velvet Rope	Janet Jackson	Virgin	202,000	
November 1	You Light Up My Life: Inspirational Songs	LeAnn Rimes	Curb	131,000	
November 8	The Firm – The Album	The Firm	Aftermath	147,000	
November 15	Harlem World	Mase	Bad Boy	273,000	
November 22	Harlem World	Mase	Bad Boy	175,000	
November 29	Higher Ground	Barbra Streisand	Columbia	207,000	
December 6	ReLoad	Metallica	Elektra	435,000	
December 13	Sevens	Garth Brooks	Capitol	896,932	
December 20	Sevens	Garth Brooks	Capitol	609,000	
December 27	Sevens	Garth Brooks	Capitol	529,000	

== See also ==
- 1997 in music
- List of number-one albums (United States)
