= Easy Mo Bee =

American record producer (born 1965)

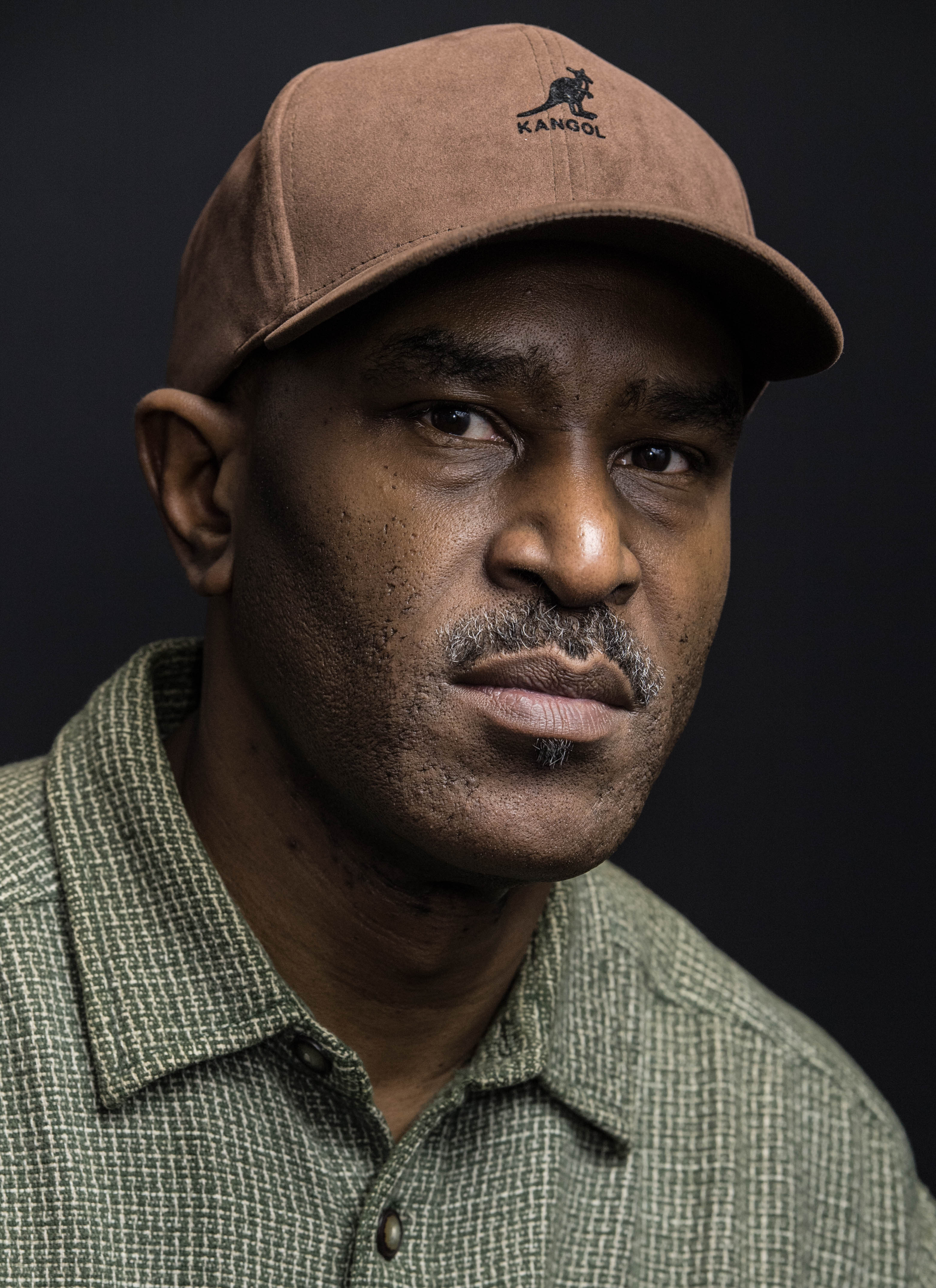
- Mo Bee in 2017

Background information
- Born: Osten S. Harvey Jr. December 8, 1965 (age 60); Brooklyn, New York City, U.S.
- Genres: Hip hop; jazz rap
- Occupations: Record producer; DJ
- Years active: 1987–present
- Labels: Bad Boy; A&M; Priority

Osten S. Harvey Jr. (born December 8, 1965), better known by his stage name Easy Mo Bee, is an American hip hop and R&B record producer and DJ, known for his production work for artists such as Big Daddy Kane and Miles Davis, as well as his affiliation with Bad Boy Records in its early years, and his production involvement in The Notorious B.I.G.'s debut album, Ready to Die. He also produced two songs on 2Pac's album, Me Against the World.

== Biography ==
=== Early career ===
Easy Mo Bee was born in Bedford–Stuyvesant, Brooklyn, New York City, and raised in the neighborhood's Lafayette Gardens projects. He began producing after hearing music by Ced Gee of Ultramagnetic MCs and Marley Marl, producer of early hip-hop hits for the Juice Crew and LL Cool J. His first production placement came on Big Daddy Kane's breakthrough album, It's a Big Daddy Thing, after which he was approached to work with another Cold Chillin' Records artist, The Genius — an early alias for Wu-Tang Clan co-founder GZA. Mo Bee produced the majority of the rapper's debut album, Words From the Genius, as well as produced "Sexcapades", a track that featured on the B-side of fellow future Wu-Tang co-founder RZA's first single, "Ooh I Love You Rakeem", which the rapper/producer released under the alias Prince Rakeem.

Around that same time, Mo Bee had a group with neighborhood friends A.B. Money and J.R. called Rappin' Is Fundamental. The trio released only one album on A&M Records in 1991: The Doo-Hop Legacy. Jazz pioneer Miles Davis approached the young producer to help fuse jazz and hip-hop. These sessions would become his last studio album, 1992's Doo-Bop. The project was released posthumously after Davis died during the recording process (leaving the project unfinished) and garnered generally mixed reviews.

=== 1990s ===
Mo Bee first linked up with Sean Combs' Bad Boy Entertainment in 1993, when he produced the first single for Combs' up-and-coming artist, the Notorious B.I.G., "Party and Bullshit". Easy also went on to produce much of the label's two flagship releases: Project: Funk da World by Craig Mack, and Ready to Die by B.I.G. Additionally, Mo Bee produced the "Flava in Ya Ear (Remix)," a driving single for both projects, featuring Craig Mack, the Notorious B.I.G., Busta Rhymes, Rampage and LL Cool J.

In 1994 and 1995, Mo Bee was also associated with 2Pac, having produced songs for both, including one called "Runnin' From tha Police," featuring both Pac and B.I.G. as well as rapper/producer Stretch and 2Pac's crew Dramacydal. In addition to featuring 2Pac and B.I.G. on the same record, the song is notable for inventive production techniques he described in an interview with HipHopDX. "There’s a bassline in the original version. Go back and listen to that record. I played the bassline live all the way through that record from the SP-1200 through multi-pitch. It was like a bass guitar strumming, and if I messed up, it was like 'Yo bring it back, and plug me in.'"

Mo Bee went on to produce two songs for Pac's 1995 album Me Against the World, although the two recorded several other songs that did not make the cut. During this time period, he also crafted moderate radio hits for the Lost Boyz ("Jeeps, Lex Coups, Bimaz & Benz"); Das EFX ("Microphone Master"); and Busta Rhymes ("Everything Remains Raw").

=== Later career ===
In 1997, Mo Bee produced for Biggie's double-disc album, Life After Death. The producer crafted two songs, "I Love the Dough" and "Going Back to Cali"; these songs would mark the last time Easy would produce for Bad Boy.

In 2000, he put out an album called Now or Never: Oddysey 2000, featuring East Coast staples Busta Rhymes, Raekwon, Prodigy, Smif-N-Wessun, Kool G Rap, and Sauce Money, along with Goodie Mob and Kurupt. Over the next decade he would craft songs for Big Daddy Kane, Ras Kass, the Wu-Tang Clan, Mos Def, Black Rob, Sean Price, Wiz Khalifa and others, eventually winning a Grammy for his work with Alicia Keys on her album, The Diary of Alicia Keys (2003).

== Personal life ==
Easy Mo Bee's younger brother is the producer The LG Experience, who produced the Ill Al Skratch album, Creep Wit' Me.

== Discography ==
Studio albums

- Now or Never: Odyssey 2000 (2000)
- Two for One (with Emskee) (2015)
- This Is My Life (with Big D) (2019)

with Rappin' Is Fundamental

- The Doo-Hop Legacy (1991)

Instrumental albums

- ...And You Don't Stop! (2015)
