= Sky's the Limit (The Notorious B.I.G. song) =

"Skys the Limit"

Single by The Notorious B.I.G. featuring 112

from the album Life After Death
- A-side: "Going Back to Cali"
- B-side: "Kick in the Door"
- Released: November 18, 1997
- Recorded: 1996
- Studio: Daddy's House Recording Studios (New York City)
- Genre: East Coast hip-hop; R&B
- Length: 5:29 (explicit album version); 4:37 (clean album version); 4:12 (radio edit)
- Label: Bad Boy; Arista
- Songwriters: Christopher Wallace; Clark Kent; Bobby Caldwell; Hubert Eaves III; James Williams
- Producer: Clark Kent

The Notorious B.I.G. singles chronology
"Been Around the World" (1997)	"Sky's The Limit" / "Going Back to Cali" (1997)	"Victory" (1998)

112 single singles chronology
"All Cried Out" (1997)	"Sky's the Limit" (1997)	"Love Me" (1998)

Music video
- "Sky's the Limit" on YouTube

Audio
- "Sky's the Limit" on YouTube

"Sky's the Limit" is the third and final single from The Notorious B.I.G.'s second album Life After Death. It features vocals from the R&B group 112 and production from Clark Kent. It contains a sample from the songs "My Flame" by Bobby Caldwell and "Keep On" by D. Train. In the US, it was released as a triple A-side along with "Going Back to Cali" and "Kick In the Door". The track was certified Gold by the RIAA. Spike Jonze directed the song's music video.

== Music video ==
The music video was released in December 1997. It shows children dressed up as and imitating The Notorious B.I.G., Puff Daddy, Busta Rhymes, Faith Evans, the rest of the Bad Boy crew, and other celebrities.

== Track listing ==
=== A-side ===
1. "Sky's the Limit" (radio edit) – (4:12)
2. "Kick in the Door" (radio edit) – (3:43)
3. "Going Back to Cali" (radio edit) – (3:57)
4. "Sky's the Limit" (instrumental) – (4:35)

=== B-side ===
1. "Kick in the Door" (club mix) – (3:43)
2. "Going Back to Cali" (club mix) – (3:55)
3. "Kick in the Door" (instrumental) – (3:43)
4. "Going Back to Cali" (instrumental) – (4:13)

== Charts ==
=== Weekly charts ===
Chart (1997-1998)	Peak position
Canada (RPM)	11
Germany (GfK)	93
Netherlands (Dutch Top 40 Tipparade)	19
Netherlands (Single Top 100)	75
New Zealand (Recorded Music NZ)	24
Scottish Singles Sales (Official Charts)	74
UK Singles (Official Charts)	35
UK Dance (Official Charts)	18
UK Hip Hop/R&B (Official Charts)	8
US Billboard Hot 100 "Going Back to Cali / Sky's the Limit"	26
US Hot R&B/Hip-Hop Songs (Billboard) "Going Back to Cali / Sky's the Limit"	31
US Hot Rap Songs (Billboard) "Going Back to Cali / Sky's the Limit"	3

=== Year-end charts ===
Chart (1997)	Position
UK Urban (Music Week)	33

== Certifications ==
Region	Certification	Certified units/sales
New Zealand (RMNZ)	Gold	15,000^{‡}
United States (RIAA)	Gold	500,000^{^}
^{^} Shipments figures based on certification alone.^{‡} Sales+streaming figures based on certification alone.
