= So Damn Happy (Aretha Franklin album) =

2003 studio album by Aretha Franklin

Studio album by Aretha Franklin
- Released: September 16, 2003
- Studios: Soup Can Studios (Detroit, MI); The Mystery Lab (West Orange, NJ); The Aretha Studio (Detroit, MI); Marvin's Room Studios (Los Angeles, CA); The Hit Factory (New York, NY); Record One (Sherman Oaks, CA); Ocean Way Recording (Los Angeles, CA); East Bay Music Studios (Tarrytown, NY)
- Genres: R&B; soul
- Length: 44:35
- Label: Arista
- Producers: Burt Bacharach; Gordon Chambers; Barry J. Eastmond; Aretha Franklin; Jimmy Jam and Terry Lewis; Ron "Amen-Ra" Lawrence; Troy Taylor; Norman West

Aretha Franklin chronology
A Rose Is Still a Rose (1998)	So Damn Happy (2003)	Jewels in the Crown: All-Star Duets with the Queen (2007)

So Damn Happy is the thirty-fifth studio album by American singer Aretha Franklin. It was released by Arista Records on September 16, 2003 in the United States. Her first studio album in five years, 'So Damn Happy features production from Burt Bacharach, Gordon Chambers, Barry J. Eastmond, Jimmy Jam and Terry Lewis, Troy Taylor, and Franklin herself. Grammy Award-winning track "Wonderful," co-written and produced by Ron "Amen-Ra" Lawrence, served as the album's lead single.

The album received mixed to positive reviews, with critics praising Franklin's enduring vocal strength and the album's classic soul sound, while some criticized the songwriting and lack of musical innovation. It peaked at number 33 on the US Billboard 200 and number 11 on the Top R&B/Hip-Hop Albums chart, while reaching the top 30 of the Italian Albums Chart. Shortly after its release, Franklin left Arista after being on their roster for 23 years and announced plans to start her own record label, Aretha Records.

== Background ==
In 1998, Franklin released her thirty-fourth studio album A Rose Is Still a Rose. A breakaway from the adult contemporary sound of her previous releases, it saw her collaborating with many famed hip hop producers and rappers such as Lauryn Hill, Sean "Puffy" Combs, and Jermaine Dupri, and took her work further into the hip hop and modern-day R&B genre. The album went gold in the US and was praised by most critics, who called it a return to form for Franklin. Following the departure of Arista Records head and longtime collaborator Clive Davis in 2000, L.A. Reid became instrumental in compiling Franklin's next project with the label. He chose songs to honor Franklin's roots, making no attempt to realize a pop record, instead aiming for a more personal, soulful vibe that would sound like "the old days." Franklin wrote and produced three songs on So Damn Happy, accompanied herself on the piano and was more generally hands-on than she had been on her other recent albums, which she cited as "the missing element." Elaborating on the overall sound of the album, she added: "Some of it is hip-hop, some of it is traditional, and it just works."

== Critical reception ==
Professional ratings
Review scores
Source	Rating
AllMusic	4/5 stars
Blender	4/5 stars
Robert Christgau	B+
MSN Music	4/5 stars
Rolling Stone	2/5 stars
Encyclopedia of Popular Music	4/5 stars

So Damn Happy received generally mixed to positive reviews from music critics. AllMusic editor Jon Bush called the album "a refreshing (though admittedly sterilized) update of her '70s records [...] composed of earthy, acoustic-driven soul, similar to contemporary records by India.Arie or Jill Scott." He felt that "the songs on So Damn Happy are all the proof her fans need to understand that her talent remains undiminished nearly 50 years after her debut as a secular act." People magazine noted that Franklin "may be worshiped for her oldies, but the Queen of Soul’s new material also deserves respect." The magazine found that the "entire album, refreshingly free of any guest rappers or trendy production, has a warm, classic R&B feel. Even Franklin’s two jazz-kissed collaborations with hip-hop soul diva Mary J. Blige sound as if they could have been recorded in the '70s."

In his review for MSN Music, Jack Smith wrote that "Aretha's voice is a beautiful instrument that she never stops strengthening and developing and in So Damn Happy her legion of fans have a slick and superior album of depth, vision and soul that's truly one to savour." Billboard found that "Franklin revisits the contemporary production well that she drew from for" previous album A Rose Is Still a Rose, noting that "unlike that album – which had its stellar moments – Happy is a more consistent package [...] striking a believable balance between new-school vibe and down-home soul." Rolling Stone journalist Barry Walters compared the album unfavorably to A Rose Is Still a Rose and wrote that "The queen of soul is still the Queen. But that doesn’t mean the material on Aretha Franklin’s latest album is deserving of her crown." He found that the songs came up "short in the melody, hook and rhythm departments," providing "adult-contemporary slickness that sometimes makes the sixty-one-year-old legend’s voice seem shrill."

== Chart performance ==
In the United States, So Damn Happy debuted and peaked at number 33 on the US Billboard 200 and number 11 on the US Top R&B/Hip-Hop Albums, with first week sales of 28,000 copies. Franklin scored her best career sales frame in the album's third week on the charts, when it shifted 27,000 copies in the week ending October 5, 2003, though this mark was later surpassed by her 2014 album Aretha Franklin Sings the Great Diva Classics. As of 2012, So Damn Happy sold 304,000 copies in the US, according to Nielsen SoundScan. Elsewhere, the album failed to chart on most music markets, though it reached number 28 on the Italian Albums Chart, ranking among her highest-charting albums there.

== Track listing ==
So Damn Happy track listing
No.	Title	Writer(s)	Producer(s)	Length
1.	"The Only Thing Missin'"	Gordon Chambers; Troy Taylor; Rick Williams; Mylia "Sunny" Davis	Taylor	3:07
2.	"Wonderful"	Aleese Simmons; Ron Lawrence; Katrina Willis; Philip "Silky" White	Amen-Ra	4:04
3.	"Holdin' On"	Earl Klugh; Mary J. Blige; Bruce Miller; Taylor	Taylor	4:37
4.	"No Matter What" (featuring Mary J. Blige)	Blige; Miller; Taylor	Taylor	4:33
5.	"Everybody's Somebody's Fool"	Terry Lewis; James Harris III; James Wright	Jimmy Jam and Terry Lewis; Big Jim	4:35
6.	"So Damn Happy"	Aretha Franklin	Franklin	4:29
7.	"You Are My Joy"	Franklin	Franklin	2:34
8.	"Falling Out of Love"	Burt Bacharach; Jerry Leiber; Jed Leiber	Bacharach	4:31
9.	"Ain't No Way"	Chambers; Barry J. Eastmond	Chambers; Eastmond	4:37
10.	"Good News"	Norman West	West	4:55
11.	"You Are My Joy (Reprise)"	Franklin	Franklin	2:33
Total length:				44:35

Samples

- "Holdin' On" contains excerpts from "The Sponge," written by Earl Klugh.

== Personnel ==
Musicians

- Aretha Franklin – vocals, backing vocals (2), acoustic piano (6, 7, 11)
- Troy Taylor – programming (1, 3, 4), keyboards (1), bass (1), drums (1), vocal arrangements (1), all instruments (3, 4)
- Ron "Amen-Ra" Lawrence – all keyboards (2), all instruments (2), drum programming (2)
- James "Big Jim" Wright – keyboards (5)
- Bobby Ross Avila – keyboards (5), guitars (5)
- Vernon D. Fails – Rhodes electric piano (6, 7, 11)
- Darryl Houston – organ (6, 7, 11)
- Adi Yeshaya – keyboards (6), additional keyboards (7, 11)
- Greg Phillinganes – keyboards (8)
- David Foster – synthesizer strings (8)
- Rob Shrock – synthesizer sound design (8)
- William Bush – keyboards (9), drum programming (9), arrangements (9)
- Barry J. Eastmond – keyboards (9), arrangements (9)
- Norman West – acoustic piano (10), keyboards (10), synthesizers (10), bass (10)
- Rick Williams – guitars (1)
- Perry Hughes – guitars (6, 7, 11)
- Michael Thompson – guitars (8)
- Ralphe Armstrong – bass (6, 7, 11)
- Neil Stubenhaus – bass (8)
- Iz Avila – drum programming (5)
- Nate Neblett – drums (6, 7, 11)
- Ricky Lawson – drums (8)
- Regine Lambert – handclaps (1)
- Kenya Lucas – handclaps (1)
- Delanté "Butta" Murphy – handclaps (1)
- Paulinho da Costa – percussion (8)
- The "Eastmond Crew" – handclaps (9)
- Tommy Morgan – harmonica solo (8)
- Burt Bacharach – rhythm and string arrangements (8)
- Gordon Chambers – backing vocals (1, 9), vocals arrangements (1), BGV arrangements (9)
- Myiia "Sunny" Davis – backing vocals (1), vocals arrangements (1)
- Sara Divine – backing vocals (2)
- Mary J. Blige – backing vocals (3, 4), vocal arrangements (3, 4)
- Brenda Corbett – backing vocals (5–7, 10, 11)
- Sandra Dance – backing vocals (5–7, 10, 11)
- Shelly Ponder – backing vocals (5–7, 10, 11)
- Mildred Scott – backing vocals (6, 7, 10, 11)
- Cindy Mizelle – backing vocals (9)

Orchestra (Tracks 6, 7 & 11)

- Adi Yeshaya – arrangements and conductor, composer
- Michael Baker – composer (6)
- Jesse Levy – orchestra contractor

Horn section (6)

- George Flynn, Birch Johnson and Keith O'Quinn – trombone
- Randy Brecker, Anthony Kadleck and Lew Soloff – trumpet
- Sharon Moe and Roger Wendt – French horn

String section

- Leo Grinhauz – cello (6)
- Jesse Levy – cello
- Kermit Moore – cello (6)
- Eugene Moye – cello (6)
- Gloria Agostini – harp (6)
- Alfred Brown – viola (6)
- Kenneth Burward-Hoy – viola (6)
- Margaret Hjaltested – viola (6)
- Olivia Koppell – viola
- Robert Chausow – violin (6)
- Israel Chorberg – violin (6)
- Cenovia Cummins – violin (6)
- Winterton Garvey – violin
- Joyce Hammann – violin (6)
- Susan Heerema – violin (6)
- Karen Karlsrud – violin (6)
- Regis Iandiorio – violin
- Byung Kook Kwak – violin (6)
- Tony Posk – violin
- Pamela Posk – violin (6)
- Sheila Reinhold – violin (6)
- Andrew Stein – violin (6)
- Gerald Tarack – violin
- Alexander Vselensky – violin (6)
- Belinda Whitney – violin (6)

== Production ==
- L.A. Reid – executive producer
- Joey Arbagey – A&R direction
- JoAnn Tominaga – production coordinator (8)
- Sue Main – music assistant (8)
- Steve Juliani – music copyist (8)
- Barbara Wesotski – A&R administrator
- Joe-Mama Nitzberg – creative director
- Richard Thomas Jennings – art direction, design
- Kwaku Alston – photography

Technical credits

- Tom Coyne – mastering at Sterling Sound (New York, NY)
- Rowie Nomeri – recording (1, 3, 4)
- Jean-Marie Horvat – mixing (1, 3, 4)
- Ron "Amen-Ra" Lawrence – recording (2)
- Steve Pageot – recording (2)
- Carl Robinson – vocal recording (2), recording (6, 7, 11), mix assistant (10)
- Prince Charles Alexander – mixing (2, 9)
- Jon Nettlesby – recording (5), vocal recording (5)
- Neal Pogue – mixing (5)
- Aretha Franklin – mixing (6, 7, 11)
- Allen Sides – recording (8), mixing (8)
- David Chase – Pro Tools engineer (8)
- Eric Ferguson – Pro Tools engineer (8)
- Louis Alfred III – recording (9)
- Barry J. Eastmond – recording (9)
- Michael J. Powell – recording (10), mixing (10)
- Norman West – recording (10), mixing (10)
- Pablo Arraya – mix assistant (1)
- Troy Taylor – additional vocal editing (2)
- Jeff Robinette – mix assistant (5)
- Ron Shelby – assistant engineer (6, 7, 10, 11)
- Tom Wilber – mix assistant (6, 7, 10, 11)
- Jeff Burns – mix assistant (8)
- Tom Sweeney – mix assistant (8)
- Keith Slattery – mix assistant (9)
- Dan "Dan-O" Oniszczak – mix assistant (10)

== Charts ==
=== Weekly charts ===
Weekly chart performance for So Damn Happy
Chart (2003)	Peak position
French Albums (SNEP)	106
Italian Albums (FIMI)	28
US Billboard 200	33
US Top R&B/Hip-Hop Albums (Billboard)	11

=== Year-end charts ===
Year-end chart performance for So Damn Happy
Chart (2003)	Position
US Top R&B/Hip-Hop Albums (Billboard)	98
