= It's All About the Benjamins =

1997 single by Puff Daddy featuring the Notorious B.I.G., Lil' Kim, and the Lox

Single by Puff Daddy featuring The Notorious B.I.G., Lil' Kim, and the Lox.

from the album No Way Out
- Released: August 12, 1997
- Genre: East Coast hip-hop; gangsta rap
- Length: 4:38
- Label: Bad Boy; Arista
- Songwriters: Sean Jacobs; Jason Phillips; David Styles; Christopher Wallace; Kimberly Jones; Deric "D-Dot" Angelettie
- Producer: Deric "D-Dot" Angelettie for the Hitmen

Puff Daddy singles chronology
"Mo Money Mo Problems" (1997)	"It's All About the Benjamins" (1997)	"Been Around the World" (1997)

The Notorious B.I.G. singles chronology
"Mo Money Mo Problems" (1997)	"It's All About the Benjamins" (1997)	"Been Around the World" (1997)

Lil' Kim singles chronology
"Call Me" (1997)	"It's All About the Benjamins" (1997)	"Money, Power & Respect" (1998)

The Lox singles chronology
"You'll See" (1996)	"It's All About the Benjamins" (1997)	"If You Think I'm Jiggy" (1998)

Music video
- "It's All About the Benjamins" on YouTube

"It's All About the Benjamins" is a song by American rapper Puff Daddy featuring the Notorious B.I.G. (in a posthumous appearance), Lil' Kim, and the Lox. It was released in 1997 as the third single from Puff Daddy's debut studio album, No Way Out. The term "Benjamins" is slang for money, referencing Benjamin Franklin, whose portrait appears on the US$100 bill. The song includes uncredited vocal arrangement contributions from Missy "Misdemeanor" Elliott and is notable for its signature guitar hook, played by Marc Solomon.

== Background ==
The song debuted in 1996 on DJ Clue's Holiday Holdup mixtape. The mixtape version of the song only featured Puff Daddy and the rap act the Lox (excluding Styles P who still appears in the video). The song was later added to Puff Daddy's debut album, No Way Out, in a remix, "It's All About the Benjamins (Remix)", which added two new verses by Lil' Kim and the Notorious B.I.G.. Missy Elliott also provided the song with a chorus which the original version lacked. This version of the song also omitted the word "Hebrews" out of Jadakiss' verse; however, the word was left in on the first pressing. Subsequent pressings removed the word. Additionally, when it was released on the Bad Boy's Greatest Hits Vol. I album, it retained the word. Due to the rarity of the obscure mixtape version, the remix featured on No Way Out is often considered the song's definitive version to avoid confusion.

The song samples two pieces of music. The first sample heard up to the end of Lil' Kim's verse is taken from the song "I Did It for Love" performed by the Love Unlimited written by Linda Laurie and Terry Etlinger. The verse performed by the Notorious B.I.G. contains a sample from the Jackson 5 song "It's Great to Be Here." This latter sample is exclusive to the No Way Out remix. After the final verse, the song reverts to the first sample and ends shortly after.

In 2008, "It's All About the Benjamins" was ranked number 32 on VH1's 100 Greatest Songs of Hip-Hop.

Puff Daddy also released a rap rock version of the song, "It's All About the Benjamins (Rock Remix)". This collaboration, also known as "Shot-Caller Rock Remix" and "Rock Remix I", features Tommy Stinson, Fuzzbubble, Rob Zombie, and Dave Grohl on drums. This remix added guitar riffs and live drums, as well as a more "in your face" approach to the song's chorus. This version had its own music video, directed by Spike Jonze, which won the Viewer's Choice award and was nominated for Best Video of the Year at the 1998 MTV Video Music Awards. The latter award was won by Madonna's "Ray of Light".

In 1999, Puff Daddy performed this remix with a live band at the Giants Stadium for the NetAid benefit concert. The performance featured Slash on guitar as well as Lil' Cease and Lil' Kim on vocals.

There is also a slightly different alternative to this remix called, "It's All About the Benjamins (Rock Remix II)." This lesser known version adds Size 14 to the song's already long collaboration line-up.

Both rock remixes of the song were released as edited versions; the explicit versions were only released on promo CDs.

== Music videos ==
Three music videos were released for the song and two of its remixes. The first music video was directed by Paul Hunter. It featured Puff Daddy, the LOX, Lil' Kim, and Biggie (who appears on a television screen, through archive footage of the Hypnotize music video) and took place in a dimly-lit concert venue and in a forest where the rappers are either running (except Biggie) or rapping.

The second music video (for the remix) is similar to the first one, except Biggie's verse and appearances are removed, replaced by a tap dancing battle between Puff Daddy and Savion Glover, with the latter winning.

The third music video (for the "Rock Remix I") is entirely different. Puff Daddy arrives at a high school prom to see a lackluster band (led by Puff Daddy in costume) performing "Everybody Hurts" by R.E.M. for a bored audience. He goes to the stage and sings a rock version of his song to the pleasure of the audience. He is joined by Lil' Kim and the LOX. Biggie doesn't appear in the video. During his verse, the rappers and the audience are seen running in the high school.

== Covers, samples, and in popular culture ==
In 1999, "Weird Al" Yankovic performed a parody of the rock remix of "It's All About the Benjamins". Yankovic's version, "It's All About the Pentiums", features himself boasting about the superiority of his computer hardware.

Puff Daddy, under the name Diddy, sampled the song in the remix to "Shot Caller" by French Montana.

The remix of Mariah Carey's "Miss You", originally recorded for Carey's Charmbracelet, samples the song and also features Jadakiss.

Bob Dylan played the song on the "Money: Part 1" episode of his Theme Time Radio Hour show in 2008.

The song has also been covered by the Ballas Hough Band who performed the song with rapper Lil' Kim in 2009.

In 2019, U.S. Representative Ilhan Omar quoted the song title in a tweet about American politicians' support for Israel, which was subsequently criticized as antisemitic.

== Commercial performance ==
"It's All About the Benjamins" was sold as a maxi-single with the Mase and Notorious B.I.G. collaboration "Been Around the World". "It's All About the Benjamins" reached its peak of number 2 on the Billboard Hot 100 on January 3, 1998, behind the million-selling single, "Candle in the Wind 1997" by Elton John, and its peak of number 1 on the Hot Rap chart on December 3, 1997.

== Live performances ==
Puff Daddy, the Lox, and Lil' Kim performed the song live at the 1998 Soul Train Music Awards on February 27, 1998.

== Formats and track listings ==
Been Around the World (Single)

1. Been Around the World (Radio Edit)
2. It's All About the Benjamins (Shot-Caller Rock Remix)

Been Around the World (Maxi-single)

1. Been Around the World (Radio Edit)
2. It's All About the Benjamins (Rock Remix I)
3. It's All About the Benjamins (Rock Remix II)
4. It's All About the Benjamins (Album Version)

Single (U.K. and Canada only)

1. It's All About the Benjamins (Rock Remix I)
2. It's All About the Benjamins (Album Version)
3. It's All About the Benjamins (Rock Remix II)
4. It's All About the Benjamins (DJ Ming (DJ) & FS Drum N' Base Mix)

== Charts ==
=== Weekly charts ===
Chart (1997–1998)	Peak position
Belgium (Ultratip Bubbling Under Flanders)	8
Estonia (Eesti Top 20)	18
Europe (Eurochart Hot 100)	61
Netherlands (Dutch Top 40)	25
Netherlands (Single Top 100)	25
Sweden (Sverigetopplistan)	51
Scottish Singles Sales (Official Charts)	36
UK Singles (Official Charts)	18
UK Hip Hop/R&B (Official Charts)	7
