= Going Back to Cali (The Notorious B.I.G. song) =

Single by the Notorious B.I.G.

from the album Life After Death
- A-side: "Sky's the Limit"
- B-side: "Kick in the Door"
- Released: November 18, 1997
- Recorded: 1995
- Studio: Daddy's House Recording Studios (New York City)
- Genre: G-funk
- Length: 5:07
- Label: Bad Boy; Arista
- Songwriters: Christopher Wallace; Osten Harvey Jr.; Roger Troutman
- Producer: Easy Mo Bee

The Notorious B.I.G. singles chronology
"Been Around the World" (1997)	"Sky's the Limit" / "Going Back to Cali" (1997)	"Victory" (1998)

"Going Back to Cali" is a song recorded by American rapper the Notorious B.I.G. from the album Life After Death. It was produced by Easy Mo Bee and contains a sample of Zapp's "More Bounce to the Ounce". It's a play on LL Cool J's 1988 hit with the same song name.

== Charts ==
=== Weekly charts ===
Chart (1997–1998)	Peak position
US Billboard Hot 100	26
US Hot R&B/Hip-Hop Songs (Billboard)	31
US Hot Rap Songs (Billboard)	3
US R&B/Hip-Hop Airplay (Billboard)	51

== Certifications ==
Region	Certification	Certified units/sales
New Zealand (RMNZ)	Gold	15,000^{‡}
^{‡} Sales+streaming figures based on certification alone.
