= Mo Money Mo Problems =

1997 single by the Notorious B.I.G. featuring Puff Daddy and Mase

Single by the Notorious B.I.G. featuring Puff Daddy and Mase

from the album Life After Death
- B-side: "Lovin' You Tonight"
- Released: July 15, 1997
- Genre: East Coast hip-hop
- Length: 4:17
- Label: Bad Boy Entertainment; Arista
- Songwriters: Christopher Wallace; Sean Combs; Mason Betha; Steven Jordan; Kelly Price; Nile Rodgers; Bernard Edwards
- Producers: Sean "Puffy" Combs; Stevie J

The Notorious B.I.G. singles chronology
"Hypnotize" (1997)	"Mo Money Mo Problems" (1997)	"It's All About the Benjamins" (1997)

Puff Daddy singles chronology
"Someone" (1997)	"Mo Money Mo Problems" (1997)	"It's All About the Benjamins" (1997)

Mase singles chronology
"Just the Way You Like It" (1997)	"Mo Money Mo Problems" (1997)	"You Should Be Mine (Don't Waste Your Time)" (1997)

Audio sample
- file; help

Music video
- "Mo Money Mo Problems" on YouTube

"Mo Money Mo Problems" is a song by American rapper the Notorious B.I.G., released as the second single from his second studio album, Life After Death (1997) on July 15, 1997, by Bad Boy Entertainment and Arista Records. It features guest performances from fellow American rappers Mase and Puff Daddy; all three rappers co-wrote the song with Stevie J, who also co-produced it with Puff Daddy. "Mo Money Mo Problems" contains a sample and an interpolation of "I'm Coming Out" by Diana Ross, hence Bernard Edwards and Nile Rodgers are credited as songwriters; the sampled portions are heard in the production, while the hook is interpolative and performed by Kelly Price in an uncredited appearance.

Released posthumously, "Mo Money Mo Problems" topped the Billboard Hot 100 for two weeks in 1997, replacing "I'll Be Missing You" at the top of the chart, Puff Daddy's own tribute to the rapper. The song is the Notorious B.I.G.'s second posthumous number-one single, following "Hypnotize", making him the only artist in Hot 100 history to have two number-one singles posthumously. It was the sixth song to hit number one posthumously for a credited artist. It received a nomination for the Grammy Award for Best Rap Performance by a Duo or Group in 1998.

== Critical reception ==
Ralph Tee from Music Week's RM rated "Mo Money Mo Problems" five out of five, picking it as Hip Hop Tune of the Week. He wrote, "Biggie's profile could not be greater right now, particularly in the States. (...) It's the one true light moment on an extremely dark album and brilliantly utilises the Diana Ross sample from 'I'm Coming Out', cleverly weaved into some serious big beats, scratching and guest appearances by Puff Daddy and Mase. Biggie delivers his rap in the natural self assured way he always did so well, the chorus being as infectious as they get on the song from the album which always screamed of a hit from day one."

== Commercial performance ==
"Mo Money Mo Problems" was able to top the Billboard Hot 100 for two weeks, giving Biggie his second number one hit in the US. The song hit number one after he had died. It was preceded by "I'll Be Missing You" by Puff Daddy featuring 112 and Faith Evans (meaning that Puff Daddy spent 13 weeks in a row at the top of the Hot 100) and was succeeded by "Honey" by Mariah Carey, which was also co-produced by Puff Daddy. "Mo Money Mo Problems" also reached number six on the UK Singles Chart.

== Music video ==
The accompanying music video for "Mo Money Mo Problems", directed by Hype Williams, featured Mase and Combs in futuristic locations designed by Ron Norsworthy, including a tunnel lined with fluorescent lamps and a stark white chamber with pressurized air blowing out of the floor, allowing the two to float in midair. This video is also famous for the red shiny jackets that are worn by Combs and Mase. The "air chamber" also had a video screen showing, at first, images of Kelly Price lip-synching to the sample of Diana Ross' voice and singing the song's chorus. During the final verse, which the Notorious B.I.G. performed, Mase and Puffy looked on as the video screen showed archival footage of B.I.G. performing, it ran at a speed so that the footage seemed to sync with B.I.G.'s vocals; since the rapper had died just prior to the release of Life After Death, and well before the filming of the video, this was the only way to have him appear in the video. The video features appearances from Sheek Louch of the LOX, Riddick Bowe, Stevie J, and Nashiem Myrick.

The video also has a short story, which is about how Combs was competing in a golf tournament and gained help from the spirit of the Notorious B.I.G, who helps him win the tournament. This was a reaction to the newly popular success of Tiger Woods. The music video was released in July 1997.

MuchMoreMusic ranked "Mo Money Mo Problems" number 31 on Listed's "40 Most Memorable Videos Pt. 1 & 2" for its flashy wardrobe, and use of syncing old footage with the lyrics. VH1 ranked the song number 58 as one of the "100 Greatest Songs of the Past 25 Years".

== Track listings ==
All versions of "Mo Money Mo Problems" feature Puff Daddy and Mase. All versions of "Lovin' You Tonight" feature R. Kelly.

- US CD and cassette single
1. "Mo Money Mo Problems" (radio mix) – 4:12
2. "Mo Money Mo Problems" (instrumental) – 4:12
- US and Canadian maxi-CD single
1. "Mo Money Mo Problems" (radio mix) – 4:12
2. "Lovin' You Tonight" (radio mix) – 5:07
3. "Mo Money Mo Problems" (instrumental) – 4:10
4. "Mo Money Mo Problems" (Razor-N-Go club mix, short version) – 4:09
5. "Mo Money Mo Problems" (Razor-N-Go club mix, long version) – 10:33
- US 12-inch single

A1. "Mo Money Mo Problems" (radio mix) – 4:12
A2. "Mo Money Mo Problems" (album version) – 4:18
A3. "#!*@ You Tonight" (radio mix) – 5:46
B1. "Mo Money Mo Problems" (Razor-N-Go club mix) – 10:33
B2. "Mo Money Mo Problems" (Razor-N-Go no rap mix) – 9:11

- UK and Australian CD single
1. "Mo Money Mo Problems" (radio mix) – 4:12
2. "Mo Money Mo Problems" (Razor-N-Go EEC main mix, edit) – 4:09
3. "Mo Money Mo Problems" (instrumental) – 4:12
4. "Mo Money Mo Problems" (Razor-N-Go EEC main mix) – 10:38
5. "Mo Money Mo Problems" (R-N-G 14th Street Duhb) – 4:40
- UK 12-inch single

A1. "Mo Money Mo Problems" (album version) – 4:18
A2. "Mo Money Mo Problems" (instrumental) – 4:12
B1. "Mo Money Mo Problems" (Razor-N-Go EEC main mix) – 10:38
B2. "Mo Money Mo Problems" (R-N-G 14th Street Duhb) – 4:40

- UK cassette single and European CD single
1. "Mo Money Mo Problems" (radio mix) – 4:12
2. "Mo Money Mo Problems" (Razor-N-Go EEC main mix, edit) – 4:09

== Charts ==
=== Weekly charts ===
1997 weekly chart performance for "Mo Money Mo Problems"
Chart (1997)	Peak position
Australia (ARIA)	10
Austria (Ö3 Austria Top 40)	31
Belgium (Ultratop 50 Flanders)	13
Belgium (Ultratop 50 Wallonia)	10
Canada Top Singles (RPM)	27
Canada Dance/Urban (RPM)	1
Estonia (Eesti Top 20)	16
Europe (Eurochart Hot 100)	10
Finland (Suomen virallinen lista)	16
France (SNEP)	36
Germany (GfK)	11
Iceland (Íslenski Listinn Topp 40)	12
Ireland (IRMA)	7
Netherlands (Dutch Top 40)	2
Netherlands (Single Top 100)	1
New Zealand (Recorded Music NZ)	2
Norway (VG-lista)	10
Scottish Singles Sales (Official Charts)	18
Sweden (Sverigetopplistan)	5
Switzerland (Schweizer Hitparade)	8
UK Singles (Official Charts)	6
UK Dance (Official Charts)	2
UK Hip Hop/R&B (Official Charts)	2
US Billboard Hot 100	1
US Dance Singles Sales (Billboard)	1
US Hot R&B/Hip-Hop Songs (Billboard)	2
US Hot Rap Songs (Billboard)	1
US Pop Airplay (Billboard)	22
US Rhythmic Airplay (Billboard)	2

2022 weekly chart performance for "Mo Money Mo Problems"
Chart (2022)	Peak position
Canada Digital Song Sales (Billboard)	14

=== Year-end charts ===
Year-end chart performance for "Mo Money Mo Problems"
Chart (1997)	Position
Australia (ARIA)	51
Belgium (Ultratop 50 Flanders)	80
Belgium (Ultratop 50 Wallonia)	77
Canada Dance/Urban (RPM)	13
Europe (Eurochart Hot 100)	58
Germany (Media Control)	64
Netherlands (Dutch Top 40)	33
Netherlands (Single Top 100)	16
New Zealand (RIANZ)	3
Sweden (Topplistan)	39
UK Singles (OCC)	57
UK Urban (Music Week)	4
US Billboard Hot 100	20
US Hot R&B Singles (Billboard)	20
US Hot Rap Singles (Billboard)	5
US Maxi-Singles Sales (Billboard)	5
US Rhythmic Top 40 (Billboard)	8
US Top 40/Mainstream (Billboard)	91

=== Decade-end charts ===
Decade-end chart performance for "Mo Money Mo Problems"
Chart (1990–1999)	Position
US Billboard Hot 100	85

== Certifications ==
Certifications for "Mo Money Mo Problems"
Region	Certification	Certified units/sales
Australia (ARIA)	Gold	35,000^{^}
New Zealand (RMNZ)	4× Platinum	120,000^{‡}
United Kingdom (BPI)	Platinum	600,000^{‡}
United States (RIAA)	Platinum	1,300,000
^{^} Shipments figures based on certification alone.^{‡} Sales+streaming figures based on certification alone.

== Release history ==
Release history and formats for "Mo Money Mo Problems"
Region	Date	Format(s)	Label(s)	Ref.
United States	July 15, 1997	12-inch vinyl; CD; cassette	Bad Boy Entertainment; Arista	
United States	July 22, 1997	Contemporary hit radio	Bad Boy Entertainment; Arista	
United Kingdom	July 28, 1997	12-inch vinyl; CD; cassette	Arista; Puff Daddy	

== No Money Enterprise version ==
"Mo Money Mo Problems"

Promotional single by No Money Enterprise
- Released: December 3, 2021
- Recorded: November 26, 2021
- Studio: Triple J (Sydney, Australia)
- Length: 3:49
- Label: ABC Music
- Songwriters: Christopher Wallace; Steven Jordan; Mason Betha; Bernard Edwards; Nile Rodgers
- Producer: Greg Wales

Music video
- "Mo Money Mo Problems (Triple J Like a Version)" on YouTube

Samoan Australian hip hop group No Money Enterprise covered the song for Australian youth broadcaster Triple J's Like a Version segment on November 26, 2021. The cover was digitally released the following week, on December 3, 2021.

According to NME Australia's Jackson Langford, they "remained sonically faithful to Biggie's original version", with member Tommy OT rapping Mase's verse, whilet Randy OT $avag.e and OT Stallyon added their own original verses to the song. The performance also included a live drummer and a female backing vocalist. Australian popular culture website Junkee's David James Young ranked the cover at number 32 out of 38 in his list of the best Like a Version covers of 2021, stating "[the] Biggie classic doesn't quite meld with the Enterprise's style."
