= Lafayette Gardens =

Public housing development in Brooklyn, New York

Lafayette Gardens Lafayette Houses
- NYCHA Property
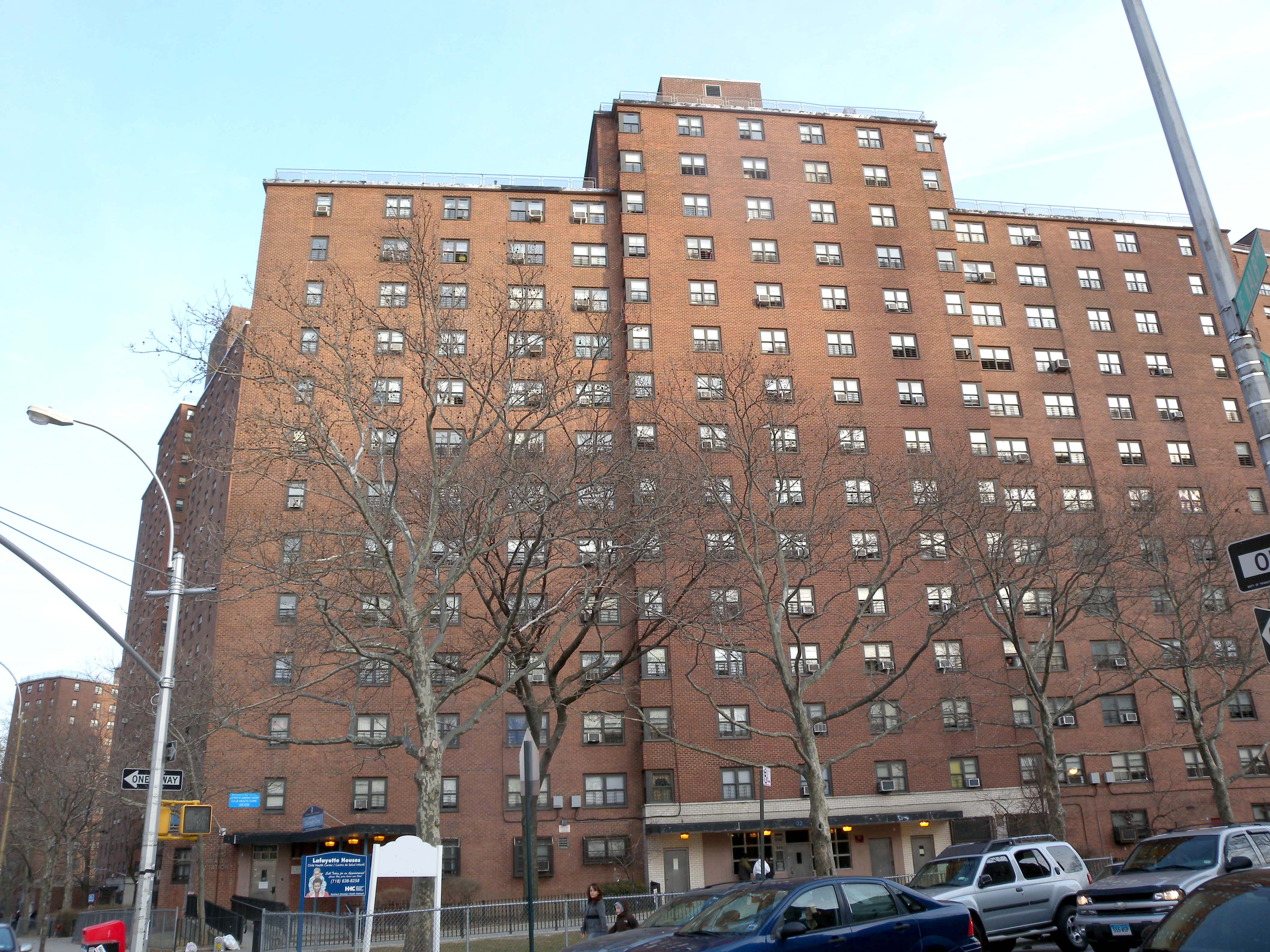
- Interactive map of Lafayette Gardens
- Country: United States
- State: New York
- City: New York City
- Borough: Brooklyn

Area
  - Total: 7.83 acres (3.17 ha)

Population
  - Total: 2,076
- Zip Codes: 11205 and 11238

The Lafayette Gardens (also known as Lafayette Houses) are a NYCHA Housing Complex that has 7 Buildings. Buildings I and III have 15 stories, Buildings II, IV, and VII have 20 stories, and Buildings V and VI have 13 stories. It is located between and DeKalb and Lafayette Avenues and also between Union Place and Franklin Avenue in the Clinton Hill Neighborhood in Brooklyn. This complex and the playground was named after Marquis de Lafayette, remembered for his role in the American Revolutionary War.

== History ==
These buildings were completed in July 1962.

=== 21st Century ===
In the early 2020s, NYC Parks planned to reconstruct playgrounds including this complex's, the design of it first started being made in June 2021 and finished in March 2023 then started with procurement at the same month and was completed in September 2025. The reconstruction started at October 2025 and the projection completion would be October 2026. The funding was $3.5M.

== See also ==
- New York City Housing Authority
