= Hypnotize (The Notorious B.I.G. song) =

1997 single by the Notorious B.I.G.

Single by The Notorious B.I.G.

from the album Life After Death
- Released: March 4, 1997
- Recorded: 1996
- Genre: Hip-hop; East Coast hip-hop
- Length: 3:49 (album version); 3:59 (CD single)
- Label: Bad Boy; Arista
- Songwriters: Christopher Wallace; Sean Combs; Deric Angelettie; Ron Lawrence; Andy Armer; Randy Alpert
- Producers: Deric "D-Dot" Angelettie; Ron "Amen-Ra" Lawrence; Sean "Puffy" Combs (co.)

The Notorious B.I.G. singles chronology
"You Can't Stop the Reign" (1996)	"Hypnotize" (1997)	"Mo Money Mo Problems" (1997)

Music video
- "Hypnotize" on YouTube

"Hypnotize" is a song by American rapper the Notorious B.I.G. featuring uncredited vocals by Pamela Long, (Note: Long is only credited with providing "background vocals" in the Life After Death album and "Hypnotize" CD single liner notes. She is not given a "featuring" credit like other artists on the album.) released as the first single from his album Life After Death by Bad Boy and Arista Records on March 4, 1997. Released five days before he was murdered, it was the fifth song by a credited artist to peak the Billboard Hot 100 posthumously, and the first since "(Just Like) Starting Over" by John Lennon in 1980. Rolling Stone ranked the song as number 30 on their list of the "100 Greatest Hip-Hop Songs of All Time".

== Background ==
Sean Combs produced "Hypnotize" and sampled Herb Alpert's 1979 hit "Rise" which was written by Andy Armer and Herb's nephew, Randy "Badazz" Alpert. Randy recalled, "I asked Puffy, in 1996 when he first called me concerning using "Rise" for "Hypnotize," why he chose the "Rise" groove. He told me that in the summer of 1979 when he was I think 10 years old the song was a huge hit everywhere in New York and "Rise" along with Chic's 'Good Times' were 'the songs' that all the kids were dancing and roller skating to that summer. He had always remembered that summer and that song. When he first played the loop for Biggie, (he said that) Biggie smiled and hugged him."

Randy continued, "Over the years I was approached by Ice Cube, Eazy-E, Vanilla Ice, and maybe another 4–5 artists to use the song and I never said 'yes' until I heard a rough version of Biggie's recording produced by Combs, D-Dot, and Ron Lawrence. I was sent a cassette from Combs and when I cranked it up I not only immediately loved it but my gut thought that this could be a number one record once again. The original "Rise" record climbed the chart all summer and became number one around the end of October; Biggie's version was released and charted its first week at number two and went to number one the second week."

"That was us saying our franchise player, our Michael Jordan, is here, and you other guys gotta top this. We're both from the same hood, and my goal was to give him that king-of-Brooklyn status with that track… That record was more of a statement of where he came from and how high the bar was going to be raised for the rest of the rappers." – Deric 'D-Dot' Angelettie

The melody and phrasing of the chorus is interpolated from a lyrical section of Slick Rick's song "La Di Da Di", and it is also from these lyrics that the title "Hypnotize" is derived. Often misattributed to Lil' Kim, Pamela Long from the group Total sang this part.

In 2013, asked about the lyrics, "Escargot, my car go...", Lil' Cease of Junior M.A.F.I.A. stated, "That's the shit that made B.I.G. dope. B.I.G. used to talk about all the cars but, nigga didn't even know how to drive. He wouldn't dare get in the driver seat."

== Reception ==
The song was a hit on U.S. radio before being issued as a single. On its release, "Hypnotize" entered the Billboard Hot 100 at number two, right behind labelmate and co-writer and co-producer Sean "Puff Daddy" Combs ("Can't Nobody Hold Me Down"). When "Hypnotize" reached number one two weeks later, it made the Notorious B.I.G. the fifth artist in Hot 100 history to have a posthumous chart-topper. It also gave back-to-back number-one hits to Combs' Bad Boy Records label. Nominated for Best Rap Solo Performance at the 1998 Grammy Awards, it lost to "Men in Black" by Will Smith. The single reached number 10 in the UK, B.I.G.'s first top 10 hit in that country. Kris Ex of Pitchfork wrote "Big was a master of flow, sounding unforced and unlabored over a bevy of pristine, hi-fidelity maximalist beats that seemed to always bow to his intent."

50 Cent told NME that the song was the one he would want played at his funeral: "I'd just want everyone to have as much of a party as possible."

Billboard and The Guardian both ranked the song number two on their lists of the greatest Notorious B.I.G. songs, and Rolling Stone ranked the song number seven on their list of the 50 greatest Notorious B.I.G. songs.

== Music video ==
The music video, directed by Paul Hunter and filmed in California, was released in March 1997. It begins with the caption: Florida Keys 5:47 pm, with B.I.G. and Combs mingling with women on a Tempest yacht. Helicopters disrupt their bash and attempt to capture them. It cuts to B.I.G. and Combs in an underground parking lot, where they spot a black Hummer and men dressed in black riding motorcycles. They attempt to get away by driving their vehicle in reverse in the streets. The video cuts to a pool party that's set underwater, where mermaid models can be seen singing through the windows, and ends with B.I.G. and Combs escaping the helicopters. Intercut throughout the video are scenes of B.I.G. and Combs behind a sepia background with female dancers and B.I.G. dancing behind a black background while pieces of the chorus are captioned below.

"For a big guy, he could really dance, but because his leg was still messed up [from a car accident that shattered his thighbone] he had to stay in one spot. But he was smiling, because he was happy to be stepped up. It was like, 'I'm free to really kill this.'" – Deric 'D-Dot' Angelettie

== Track listing ==
1. "Hypnotize" (radio mix) – 4:06
2. "Hypnotize" (instrumental) – 3:59
3. "Hypnotize" (album version) – 5:32

== Charts ==
=== Weekly charts ===
Chart (1997)	Peak position
Australia (ARIA)	63
Austria (Ö3 Austria Top 40)	27
Canada (Nielsen SoundScan)	3
Canada Dance/Urban (RPM)	15
Europe (Eurochart Hot 100)	67
Germany (GfK)	15
Iceland (Íslenski Listinn Topp 40)	8
Netherlands (Dutch Top 40)	23
Netherlands (Single Top 100)	16
New Zealand (Recorded Music NZ)	15
Scottish Singles Sales (Official Charts)	41
Sweden (Sverigetopplistan)	29
UK Singles (Official Charts)	10
UK Dance (Official Charts)	3
UK Hip Hop/R&B (Official Charts)	4
US Billboard Hot 100	1
US Hot R&B/Hip-Hop Songs (Billboard)	1
US Hot Rap Songs (Billboard)	1
US Rhythmic Airplay (Billboard)	3

Chart (2022)	Peak position
Canada Digital Song Sales (Billboard)	7

=== Year-end charts ===
Chart (1997)	Position
Canada Dance/Urban (RPM)	11
Iceland (Íslenski Listinn Topp 40)	41
Germany (Media Control)	87
Netherlands (Single Top 100)	74
UK Urban (Music Week)	9
US Billboard Hot 100	25
US Hot R&B Singles (Billboard)	24
US Hot Rap Singles (Billboard)	5
US Rhythmic Top 40 (Billboard)	21

=== Decade-end charts ===
Chart (1990–1999)	Position
US Billboard Hot 100	88

== Certifications ==
Region	Certification	Certified units/sales
Denmark (IFPI Danmark)	Gold	45,000^{‡}
Germany (BVMI)	Platinum	600,000^{‡}
Italy (FIMI)	Platinum	100,000^{‡}
New Zealand (RMNZ)	7× Platinum	210,000^{‡}
Spain (Promusicae)	Gold	30,000^{‡}
United Kingdom (BPI)	3× Platinum	1,800,000^{‡}
United States (RIAA)	Platinum	1,200,000
^{‡} Sales+streaming figures based on certification alone.

== Release history ==
Region	Date	Format(s)	Label(s)	Ref.
United States	March 4, 1997	Rhythmic contemporary radio	Arista; Bad Boy Entertainment	
United States	April 4, 1997	12-inch vinyl; CD; cassette	Arista; Bad Boy Entertainment	
United Kingdom	April 21, 1997	CD; cassette	Arista; Puff Daddy	

== See also ==
- List of Billboard Hot 100 number-one singles of 1997
- List of number-one R&B singles of 1997 (U.S.)
