= Ron "Amen-Ra" Lawrence =

American songwriter

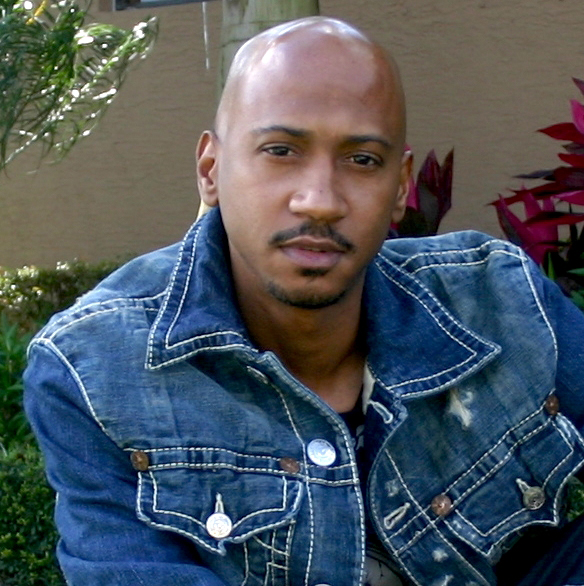

Background information
- Born: Val Anthony Ronald Lawrence; November 14, 1965 (age 60); Dominica
- Origin: New York City, U.S.
- Genres: East Coast hip-hop, R&B
- Occupation: Record producer
- Label: Bad Boy Records
- Member of: The Hitmen
- Website: thisisron.com

Val Anthony Ronald Lawrence (born November 14, 1965), also known by his stage name Amen-Ra, is an American record producer, best known for his production credits for Sean Combs' Bad Boy Records.

== Early life ==
Lawrence was born on the island of Dominica. In 1970, his family immigrated to the United States, settling in East Elmhurst, Queens, in New York City. After high school, he attended Howard University.

In college he met Deric "D-Dot" Angelettie, and formed the rap duo Two Kings in a Cipher, which released the album From Pyramids to Projects. Later, the duo joined the Bad Boy Entertainment production team called "The Hitmen", with fellow Howard University alumnus Sean "Diddy" Combs.

== Music career ==
The Hitmen produced numerous rap and R&B hits of prominent radio play. He is best known for the singles "Hypnotize" by The Notorious B.I.G., "Been Around The World" by Sean "Diddy" Combs, "Where I'm From" by Jay-Z, "Money, Power, Respect" by The Lox, the Grammy-nominated "Love Like This" as well as "All Night Long" by Faith Evans, "Phenomenon" by LL Cool J, "You Should Be Mine" by Brian McKnight, "Can't Let Her Go" by Boyz II Men, "Cold Rock a Party" remix by MC Lyte, and "The Theme (It's Party Time)" by Tracey Lee. He produced the song "Wonderful" for Aretha Franklin for her album So Damn Happy. On June 23, 1998, Lawrence received a Governors Award from the National Academy of Recording Arts & Sciences on. In 1999, Ron produced "In For Life" by Terror Squad from their self-titled debut album and featured verses from Big Pun, Triple Seis, Prospect, and Cuban Link.

Lawrence created the hip-hop source score of Spike Lee's film Bamboozled, and appearing in it as a musical engineer. He produced the theme song " A Woman Like Me", by Beyoncé, for the Pink Panther soundtrack. Lawrence himself later studied film at the New York Film Academy and created the short film Founding Fathers, a documentary on hip hop's birth and evolution.

In 2014, Lawrence started a film production company Spotlyte Media. In 2015, he produced and edited the short film Above the Sun. In 2016, he wrote, directed and produced the short film, Angel of Light and the documentary Commutation for Guy Fisher. In 2017, he produced, directed and edited the documentary Rap Dimension, and Rolling Stone published Jay-Z's 50 greatest songs with Lawrence's production coming at number one.

In 2018, he produced and edited the webisode series "Diary of a Music Producer". In 2019, Lawrence published his autobiography titled Where I'm From, a book about his life story growing up in East Elmhurst, his experience at Howard University and creating hits for various musicians. He also appeared in the Netflix series, Hip-Hop Evolution, season 3 episode 2 which is titled Life After Death, covers a segment on Sean "Diddy" Combs and The Hitmen.

== Studio album ==
With Two Kings in a Cipher

- From Pyramids to Projects (Bahia/RCA, 1991)

== Production credits ==
Year	Artist	Song	Album
1994	A.D.O.R.	Life Flow	The Concrete
1994	Ed O.G.	Going Out My Mind (No More Love Mix)	Non-album single
1995	Suga	What's Up Star	The Show (soundtrack)
1996	MC Lyte	Cold Rock a Party (Remix)	Bad As I Wanna Be
1997	Brian McKnight	You Should Be Mine (Don't Waste Your Time)	
1997	Notorious B.I.G.	Hypnotize	Life After Death
1997	Tracey Lee	The Theme (Keep Your Hands High); Big Will; Clue (Who Shot J.R.?)	Many Faces
1997	Puff Daddy	Big Ole Butt	In the Beginning... There Was Rap
1997	Boyz II Men	Can't Let Her Go	Evolution
1997	Puff Daddy (+ Family)	Been Around the World; Don't Stop What; I Love You Baby (feat. Black Rob)	No Way Out
1997	LSG	You Got Me	LSG
1997	LL Cool J	Phenomenon; Hot Hot Hot	Phenomenon
1997	Mase	Do You Wanna Get Money?; Will They Die 4 U?; Wanna Hurt Ma$e?	Harlem World
1997	Jay-Z	I Know What Girls Like; Where I'm From	In My Lifetime, Vol. 1
1998	The Lox	Money, Power, Respect; So Right	Money, Power, Respect
1998	MC Lyte	Woo Woo (Freak Out)	Woo (soundtrack)
1998	MC Lyte	Oogie Boogie	Seven & 7
1998	All City	The Hot Joint	Metropolitan
1998	Tyrese	You Get Yours	Tyrese
1998	Faith Evans	Love Like This; All Night Long; Life Will Pass You By	Keep the Faith
1998	Lord Tariq & Peter Gunz	My Time to Go	Make It Reign
1998	R. Kelly	Spendin' Money	R.
1998	System of a Down, Boys	Will They Die 4 U?	Chef Aid: Soundtrack
1999	The Madd Rapper	They Just Don't Know	Tell 'Em Why U Madd
1999	Terror Squad	In for Life	Terror Squad: the Album
1999	Rakim	Uplift; Real Shit	The Master
1999	Mase	Stay Out of My Way	Double Up
2000	Mau Maus	Blak Iz Blak	Bamboozled (soundtrack)
2000	Carl Thomas	Cold Cold World	Carl Thomas
2001	Mary J. Blige	Love	No More Drama
2001	G Dep	Everyday	Child of the Ghetto
2001	Jimmy Cozier	No More Playing Games	Jimmy Cozier
2001	Luther Vandross	How Do I Tell Her	Luther Vandross
2002	LL Cool J	Throw Ya L's Up; 10 Million Stars	10
2002	Blu Cantrell & Lady May	Round Up	Bittersweet
2003	Aretha Franklin	Wonderful	So Damn Happy
