= Deric Angelettie =

American record producer and rapper

- Also known as: D-Dot; Mad Rapper; D.O.P.; Papa Dot
- Born: Deric Michael Angelettie; July 31, 1968 (age 58); Brooklyn, New York City, U.S.A
- Genres: East Coast hip-hop; R&B
- Occupations: Record producer; rapper; songwriter; television producer; film producer
- Years active: 1989–present
- Labels: Bad Boy; Crazy Cat Catalogue; Columbia; The Mystery System
- Member of: The Hitmen
- Website: madrapper.com

Deric Michael Angelettie (born July 31, 1968), also known by his stage names D-Dot, Papa Dot, and the Madd Rapper, is an American record producer. He served as executive producer and A&R for the album No Way Out (1997) by Puff Daddy & the Family, which won a Grammy Award. He has since done so for three other albums nominated for the award, and won the BMI Urban Award in 2001.

While attending Howard University in the late 1980s, Angelettie and Ron "Amen-Ra" Lawrence formed the hip hop duo Two Kings in A Cipher, who signed with RCA Records to release their debut album, From Pyramids to Projects (1991). He joined Bad Boy Records' production team The Hitmen by 1995, after which he was credited on releases for artists including the Notorious B.I.G., Jay-Z, and Mary J. Blige, among others. He served as the team's de facto "Captain" by the time he produced the label's 1997 singles "Hypnotize" by Notorious B.I.G. and "It's All About The Benjamins" by Diddy.

As a recording artist, he created an alter ego, The Madd Rapper, to guest perform on B.I.G.'s second album, Life After Death (1997). Angelettie signed with Columbia Records to release his debut studio album as the character, Tell Em Why U Madd (1999), which contained guest appearances from then-unknown rappers 50 Cent (on the song "How to Rob") and Kanye West—the latter of whom Angelettie managed.

Outside of music, Angelettie is the founder of Crazy Cat Catalogue and Crazy Cat Cinemas. He has appeared on and produced the titlular song for MTV's reality show Making The Band 1 & 2. He co-hosted the television series Hip-Hop Hold 'Em on UPN, and served as a consultant for the 2009 film Notorious, due to his personal connection with the film's subject. He was an associate producer for the 2018 film Steps-The Movie, which was executive produced by Shaquille O'Neal.

== Career ==
=== Early career ===
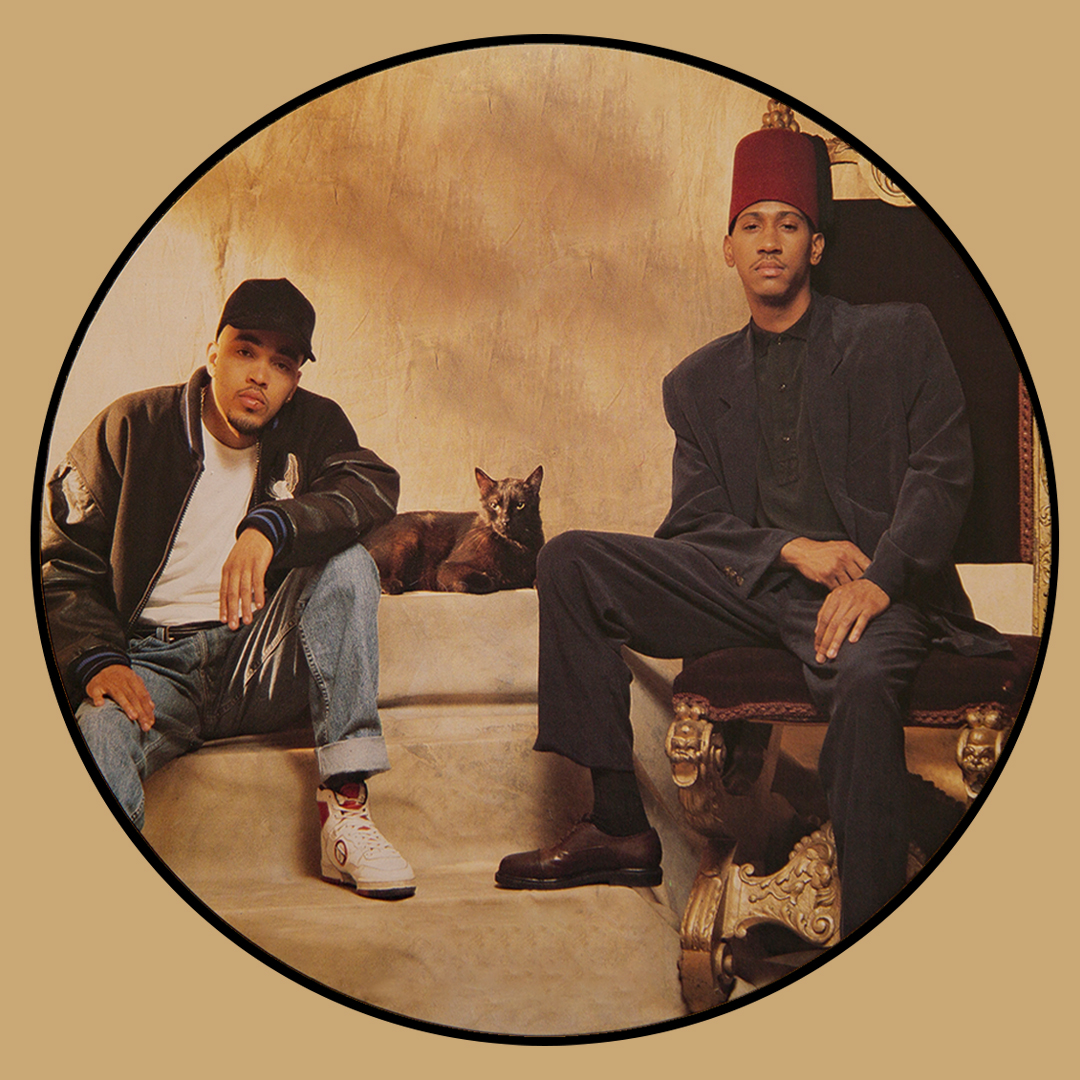
Promotional image for Two Kings in a Cipher, pictured c. 1991

During his time at Howard University from 1986 to 1989, Angelettie and colleague Ron "Amen-Ra" Lawrence formed the conscious hip hop duo, Two Kings in a Cipher, in 1988. Two years later, they signed with RCA Records and Bahia, and released their debut single, "Movin 'On 'Em" shortly after. Their debut studio album, From Pyramids to Projects (1991) was met with positive critical reception despite failing to chart, and the duo was dropped from RCA in 1993.

Angelettie began his work with Bad Boy Records in 1993 as an intern, and within five years, was named the unofficial captain of the label's in-house production team, the Hitmen. He has also served as VP of A&R during his time with the label. He was the sole credited producer of label boss Sean Combs' 1997 single "It's All About the Benjamins", and co-produced the Notorious B.I.G's "Hypnotize"—the rapper's final single released before his death—along with Lawrence earlier that year. Outside of the label, he amassed credits for other artists including Lil' Kim, Nas, Jay-Z, Outkast, and Busta Rhymes. During this time, Angelettie met and subsequently managed then-unknown rapper Kanye West during his time with Roc-A-Fella Records in 1999.

=== Later career ===
Angelettie's "The Madd Rapper" persona debuted with a skit on the Notorious B.I.G.'s Life After Death in 1997. His debut studio album, Tell 'Em Why U Madd, was released by Angelettie's label, Crazy Cat Catalogue in a joint venture with Columbia Records in 1999; it contained guest appearances from Eminem, Raekwon, Diddy, Ma$e, Busta Rhymes, and then-unknown rappers 50 Cent and West.

On November 19, 1998, Angelettie was charged with participating in the assault of Blaze Magazine editor Jesse Washington. Washington claimed that the assault occurred due to him publishing a photograph, taken with Angelettie's consent, which revealed the Madd Rapper's identity. The editor and Angelettie settled the case out of court.

In 2000, due to legal issues with Mothers Against Drunk Driving (MADD), the stage name was changed to simply Mad Rapper.

Angelettie later appeared on MTVʼs reality show Making the Band 1 & 2, co-hosted Hip-Hop Hold 'Em on UPN, and served as a consultant for the 2009 film Notorious by Fox Broadcasting Company and Searchlight Pictures. He founded Connect the Dots in 2006, a management and strategy company with clients such as record producer Stevie J. Angelettie has since co-written the film House of Bodies in 2014, served as a producer for the film Steps the following year, and executive produced Complex's documentary, Rules To This Sh!t in 2021.

== Personal life ==
Angelettie's background includes being born and raised an only child in Brooklyn, New York, to an African-American father Eric Angelettie and a Puerto Rican mother, Dr. Noemi Angelettie-Wallace. He graduated from Samuel J Tilden High School in 1986 and then later attended Howard University in Washington, D.C., but dropped out in 1989 to pursue his music career. He is married to author Lisa Angelettie and is a father to four daughters.

== Discography ==
=== Studio albums (as an artist) ===
Two Kings in a Cipher

- From Pyramids to Projects (1991), Bahia Entertainment/RCA

Madd Rapper

- Tell 'Em Why U Madd (1999), Crazy Cat/Columbia

Mad Rapper

- Appreciate the Hate - Vol #2 (2013)
- Appreciate the Hate - Vol #3 (2019)
- Fire Sign - the EP (2020)

Mad Rapper Appearances
Year	Song	Artist	Album
1997	Kick in the Door (skit)	The Notorious B.I.G.	Life After Death
1997	Mad Producer (Interlude)	Puff Daddy	No Way Out
1997	Mad Rapper (Interlude)	Mase	Harlem World
1998	Mad Rapper (Interlude)	The Lox	Money, Power, Respect
1998	Get Your Shit Right	Jermaine Dupri, DMX	Life in 1472
1998	Mad Rapper (Intro/Interlude/Outro)	Mad Rapper	Bad Boy Greatest Hits
1999	How to Rob	50 Cent	In Too Deep OST
1999	Mad Rapper (Interlude)	Cha Cha	Dear Diary
1999	Mad Rapper (Interlude)	Puff Daddy	Forever
1999	Mad Rapper (Interlude)	Mase	Double UP
2000	Mad Rapper (Interlude)	Black Rob	Life Story
2009	Murder	DJ JS-1	Ground Original 2
2011	Hip Hop	Fred the Godson	City of God
2019	What You Mad At	Dave East	Survival

Production Credits
Year	Song	Artist	Album
1995	What's Up Star?	Suga	The Show OST
1996	I Want You Baby	Horace Brown	Horace Brown
1996	Lay Down (Bad Boy Remix)	Nalini	~
1996	ATLiens (Remix)	OutKast	~
1997	The Theme; Big Will; Clue (Who Shot JR?)	Tracey Lee	Many Facez
1997	Hypnotize; The World Is Filled	The Notorious B.I.G.	Life After Death
1997	Been Around the World; Do You Know?; All About the Benjamins	Puff Daddy	No Way Out
1997	Everything You Want (Remix)	Ray J	~
1997	Hot, Hot, Hot	LL Cool J	Phenomenon
1997	Give It Up	SWV	Release Some Tension
1997	Where I'm From	Jay-Z	In My Lifetime, Vol. 1
	Lately I	Faith Evans	Faith
	Rock the Body	Queen Pen & Tracey Lee	Hav Plenty OST
	All 4 the Love; Everybody Wanna Rat	The Lox	Money, Power, Respect
	Sitting Home	Total	Kim, Keisha, Pam
	Get Your Shit Right; All That's Got to Go	Jermaine Dupri	Life in 1472
	Off the Hook (Remix)	Jody Watley	Flower
	Hot Shit Makin Ya Bounce	Busta Rhymes	Extinction Level Event
1999	Shorty You Keep Playin With My Mind	Imajin	Imajin
1999	My Life	Foxy Brown	Chyna Doll
1999	Cali Chronic	Harlem World	The Movement
1999	Sunglasses	Cha Cha	Dear Diary
1999	Just You & I; Is It You (Deja Vu Remix)	Made Men	Classic: Limited Edition
1999	Joanne	Trina and Tamara	Trina and Tamara
1999	Fuck Me, No Fuck You	Mase	Double Up
1999	Chain Swang; Rebuilding	Goodie Mobb	World Party
1999	Let Me Get Down; If I Should Die Before	Notorious B.I.G.	Born Again
2000	You Don't Know Me	Black Rob	Life Story
2000	Hands in the Air	Da Brat	Unrestricted
2000	Don't Mess With Me	Lil Kim	Notorious K.I.M.

== Awards ==
=== MTV Video Music Awards ===
Year	Nominee/work	Credits	Award	Result
1998	"It's All About the Benjamins" (Rock Remix)	Co-production	Video of the Year	Nominated
1998	"It's All About the Benjamins" (Rock Remix)	Co-production	Viewer's Choice	Won
1998	"Come with Me" (from Godzilla)	Co-production	Best Video from a Film	Nominated

=== Grammy Awards ===
Year	Nominee/work	Credits	Award	Result
1998	No Way Out	Executive production	Best Rap Album	Won
1998	Life After Death	A&R	Best Rap Album	Nominated

=== NARAS Awards ===
Year	Nominee/work	Credits	Award	Result
1998	Deric Angelettie	Producer of The Year	Grammy Naras Governor's New Horizon Award	Won

=== Rolling Stone's 500 Greatest Albums of All Time ===
Rank	Artist	Album	Credits	Year
483	The Notorious B.I.G.	Life After Death	A&R	1997

== Filmography ==
- Behind the Music (2001) - Angelettie
- Driven (Lil' Kim) (2003) - Angelettie
- Making the Band (1 & 2) (2004) - Angelettie, music producer
- Hip-Hop Hold 'Em (2006) - host
- E! True Hollywood Story (2006) - Angelettie
- Life After Death: The Movie (2007) - Angelettie
- Notorious (2009) - music consultant
- Rules to This Shit (2019) - executive producer
- Steps - The Movie (2021) - associate producer
- Neutralize (2021) - producer
