= T Money (rapper) =

American rapper and television host

T-Money (born Tyrone James Kelsie) is a rapper, actor, and former MTV Video Jockey. He was a member in the group Original Concept. He was present in the evolution of hip hop as one of the first artists to produce bass music using the 808 drum machine. This can be found in their songs Knowledge Me and Pump That Bass. The elements of bass music and vinyl spinning remain a component in mainstream hip hop music.

== Early life and education ==
T-Money was born and raised in Westbury, New York. He attended Westbury High School, where he was on the football team. In high school, he formed a DJ group, known as Original Concept with longtime friend, Doctor Dré.

He was also one of the DJ’s for the college radio station, WBAU 90.3 FM, which included a host of other hip hop artists from that time, including Flavor Flav, Chuck D, Busta Rhymes, and his group member Doctor Dré. In 1996, T-Money graduated from the New York Institute of Technology with a Bachelor’s degree in communications.

== Original Concept ==
In 1985, T-Money, along with the other members of Original Concept, released the promo Knowledge Me, which aired on WBAU radio. T-Money wrote the lyrics, performed vocals, and co-produced the piece with Doctor Dré and Eric McIntosh. After hearing the song, Rick Rubin signed the group to Def Jam Recordings. Original Concept was one of the first of many artists to sign with Def Jam Recordings. Their song Can You Feel It? went number #1 on Miami Radio in 1985. In 1988, their album Straight from the Basement of Kooley High was released by the label. Their song "Pump That Bass", is a frequently sampled song in the hip hop genre.

== Television and screen career ==
=== Yo! MTV Raps ===
T-Money was a co-host and sidekick for Yo! MTV Raps with Doctor Dré and Ed Lover. Yo! MTV Raps was a music variety show which included comedic sketches, music videos, live performances and appearances on the set. T-Money portrayed several other popular characters, including: Uncle Bobo Lovetree, The Nubianator, Clarence Coldwater Capsule, and Michael Jackson at Forty.

The show ran from 1988 until 1995, with the last episode including a massive rap battle, cited as a significant moment in hip hop history.

=== Acting ===
After Yo! MTV Raps, T-Money had a brief acting career, using his stage name as his credits. He starred in Juice (1992) and Who's the Man? (1993).

=== MTV VJ ===
From 1992 to 1993, T-Money vee-jayed on the MTV game show Lip Service, with host Jay Mohr. During T-Money’s time on the show Lip Service won the CableACE Award in the game show category.

== Other ventures ==
In 2020, T-Money reunited with Ed Lover and Doctor Dré for Yo! Just Say Vote.

Currently, T-Money is an advisor with the Hip-Hop Education Center.
