= Back Up Off Me! =

Studio album by Ed Lover & Doctor Dré
- Released: November 8, 1994
- Recorded: 1994
- Genre: Hip hop
- Length: 40:18
- Label: Relativity
- Producer: Charles Stettler (exec.); Ed Lover (also exec.); Franklyn Grant; Doctor Dré; Davy D; Erick Sermon; Jolly Stomper Productions; Marley Marl; The 45 King; T-Money; Ty Fyffe (co.); Craig King (co.)

Singles from Back Up Off Me!
- 1. "Back Up Off Me!" Released: 1994; 2. "For the Love of You" Released: 1995

Professional ratings
Review scores
| Source | Rating |
|---|---|
| AllMusic | 2/5 stars |

Back Up Off Me! is the only studio album by Ed Lover and Doctor Dré, who were the hosts of Yo! MTV Raps.

The album was released on November 8, 1994 via Relativity Records. Production was handled by Franklyn Grant, Davy D, Erick Sermon, Jolly Stomper Productions, Marley Marl, The 45 King, T-Money, Ty Fyffe, Ed Lover & Doctor Dré. Guest appearances include Erick Sermon & Keith Murray of Def Squad, Lords of the Underground, Naima Bowman, Notorious B.I.G. of Junior M.A.F.I.A., Todd-1, and T-Money of Original Concept.

Back Up Off Me! was a mild success, peaking at #91 on the Top R&B/Hip-Hop Albums and #27 on the Top Heatseekers charts in the United States. The album spawned two charting singles: "Back Up Off Me!" and "For the Love of You". Its title track peaked at #85 on the Billboard Hot 100 and at #23 on the Hot Rap Singles, and its second single, "For the Love of You", peaked at #47 on the Hot Rap Singles chart.

== Track listing ==
| No. | Title | Writer(s) | Producer(s) | Length |
|---|---|---|---|---|
| 1. | "Back Up off Me!" (featuring T-Money) | James Roberts; Tyrone J. Kelsie | Doctor Dré; Ed Lover; T-Money; Davy D | 4:21 |
| 2. | "It's Goin' Down" (featuring Erick Sermon and Keith Murray) | James Roberts; Erick Sermon; Keith Murray; George Clinton; Bootsy Collins; Bernie Worrell | Erick Sermon | 4:21 |
| 3. | "Tootin' on the Hooters" | James Roberts; Franklyn Grant; Tyrone Fyffe; Gregory Webster | Franklyn Grant; Ty Fyffe (co.) | 4:24 |
| 4. | "East Coast Sound" (featuring Lords of the Underground) | James Roberts; Marlon Williams; Craig King | Marley Marl; Craig King (co.) | 4:22 |
| 5. | "For the Love of You" | James Roberts; Ernie Isley; O'Kelly Isley Jr.; Ronald Isley; Rudolph Isley; Chris Jasper | Jolly Stomper Productions; Franklyn Grant (co.) | 4:37 |
| 6. | "Who's the Man?" (featuring Notorious B.I.G. and Todd 1) | James Roberts; Christopher Wallace; Todd Brown; Adrian Angevin; Mark James | Franklyn Grant; The 45 King | 4:37 |
| 7. | "It's Like That Y'all" | James Roberts; Franklyn Grant; Tyrone Fyffe | Franklyn Grant; Ty Fyffe (co.) | 3:57 |
| 8. | "Knowledge Me Again" | James Roberts; André Brown; Tyrone J. Kelsie | Doctor Dré; Franklyn Grant (co.) | 5:16 |
| 9. | "Intimate" (featuring Naima Bowman) | James Roberts; Franklyn Grant; Woody Cunningham | Franklyn Grant | 4:50 |
| 10. | "Recognize" | James Roberts; Franklyn Grant | Ed Lover; Franklyn Grant | 4:10 |
| Total length: | | | | 40:18 |

== Chart history ==
| Chart (1994) | Peak position |
|---|---|
| US Top R&B/Hip-Hop Albums (Billboard) | 91 |
| US Heatseekers Albums (Billboard) | 27 |
