= T-money (disambiguation) =

T-money, T Money or T-Money may refer to:

- Tmoney, series of rechargeable smart devices for transportation in South Korea
- T-Money (rapper), past member of hip-hop group Original Concept
- T-Money, fictional character on Noah's Arc (TV series)
- T-Money, fictional character in The Search for Santa Paws and its sequel
- T-Money, nickname of Terry Crews on Battle Dome
- T-Money, nickname of Thor on The Life and Times of Juniper Lee
- T-Money, nickname of Tarrell Wright on Storage Hunters

== See also ==
- T. Money, nickname of American bass player Edward Tony Green
- JT Money, American rapper
