= Ajamu Kambon =

American music producer (born 1991)

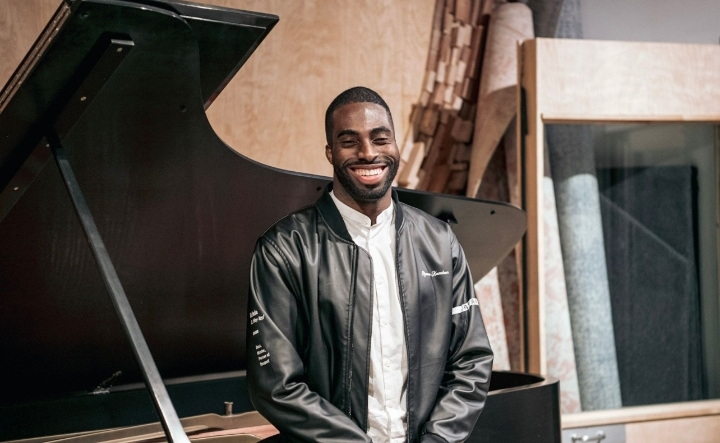
- Born: December 7, 1991 (age 34); New York City, U.S.
- Education: University of Virginia
- Occupations: Record executive, Investor, author, entrepreneur
- Years active: 2012–present
- Known for: CEO and co-founder of Deep Root Records

Ajamu Kambon (born 1991 in New York, U.S.) is an American entrepreneur, music executive and author. He is the co-founder and CEO of Deep Root Records.

== Early life and education ==
Ajamu was born on December 7, 1991, in New York City, United States. He was raised by a single mother. In his early childhood he studied dance under Pattie Harris at The Atlantic City Dance Theatre.

Before the start of his studies at Princeton High School, he received a scholarship to attend the Wyoming Seminary, where he learned how to play different percussion instruments. At Princeton High School, he qualified for the 400-meter hurdles and took his team to the Meet of Champions and Penn Relays. In 2008, Kambon was accepted into The W.E.B DuBois Scholars Institute's Business Academy at Princeton University where he studied marketing and business ethics.

Ajamu studied Business Management, Finance and Marketing from University of Virginia. In 2014 he got his B.S. degree in Commerce with a minor in Religious studies, focusing on Buddhism.

== Career ==
In 2015, Kambon along with Francis Mercier founded "Deep Root Records", which is a record label having headquarters in New York, U.S. Currently, Deep Root Records consists of 4 imprints: Deep Root Records, Deep Root Tribe, Deep Root Underground, and WYN Records and houses three departments including artist management, sync & licensing, and event production and management.

Since launch, Deep Root Records has signed more than 35 artists, fifty music producers and organized around 200 music events. It produces more than a hundred shows a year globally, producing events in New York City, London, Paris, Egypt, and India. Deep Root Records is 100% black owned with no outside investment, or funding.

In 2022 Kambon became a partner in the We Belong Here Festival, which included performances from Bakermat, Don Diablo, Lost Frequencies, Nora En Pure, Purple Disco Machine, Yotto, and Deep Root Tribe stage at Virginia Key Beach.

On February 16, 2021, Kambon was named on to Forbes's Next 1000 list and on July 21, 2023, he was inducted as a member of The Recording Academy.

He is an author of the book, "Do You: Success, Wealth, and Relationships-You, Yourself, and Your Dreams", which was published in 2013.

== Philanthropy and leadership ==
In 2020 with the COVID-19 pandemic at an all-time high, Ajamu launched the #UnitedByMusic live stream series & fundraiser, in partnership with Paris's Radio FG and the Recording Academy's non-profit MusiCares With over 2 Million people reached, #UnitedByMusic continues to serve as one of Kambon's main initiatives of support for the artist and nightlife community. Artists involved in the project over the years: Roger Sanchez, Kenny Dope, Barbara Tucker, Moon Boots, LP Giobbi, DJ Chus, Tube & Berger, OFFAIAH, Layla Benitez, Leftwing, Kody, and CID.

As a partner on The We Belong Here Festival, a portion of proceeds from every ticket purchased directly contributes to the "We Belong Here Scholarship Fund", which grants musical education scholarships to Scratch Academy, within underprivileged areas, nearby each We Belong Here festival and/or experience.

In 2013 Ajamu self-published his book "Do You", which made it in the Top 200 Books within Amazon's "Business & Money" Short Reads in 2016. The book discusses several ways in which one can build residual income and wealth, as well as how to navigate the world as an entrepreneur and small business owner.
