= Break My Heart (Dua Lipa song) =

2020 single by Dua Lipa

Single by Dua Lipa

from the album Future Nostalgia
- Released: 25 March 2020
- Recorded: 2019
- Studio: Gold Tooth (Beverly Hills); Oddities (London)
- Genre: Dance-pop; disco-funk
- Length: 3:41
- Label: Warner
- Songwriters: Dua Lipa; Melissa Webb; Andrew Wotman; Ali Tamposi; Stefan Johnson; Jordan K. Johnson; Andrew Farriss; Michael Hutchence
- Producers: Andrew Watt; The Monsters & Strangerz

Dua Lipa singles chronology
"Sugar (remix)" (2020)	"Break My Heart" (2020)	"Hallucinate" (2020)

Music video
- "Break My Heart" on YouTube

"Break My Heart" is a song by English singer Dua Lipa from her second studio album, Future Nostalgia (2020). The song was written by Lipa, Ali Tamposi, Stefan Johnson, Jordan K. Johnson, and Andrew Watt, while the production was handled by Watt alongside the Monsters & Strangerz. Due to a similarity to the guitar riff in INXS's 1987 song "Need You Tonight", band members Andrew Farriss and Michael Hutchence are also credited as writers, and the similarity is credited as an interpolation. The song was released for digital download and streaming through Warner Records as the third single from Future Nostalgia on 25 March 2020, just two days before the album's release. It is a retro-futuristic dance-pop and disco-funk song with elements of house and 1980s music that is set to a Europop beat. A vulnerable song, it sees Lipa questioning whether a new love will leave her broken-hearted.

Several music critics commended the production elements of "Break My Heart" as well as its "Need You Tonight" interpolation; some thought it sounded too similar to its influences. The song placed on numerous best of 2020 year-end lists, including ones published by Billboard, The New York Times and NPR, while also receiving numerous awards as well as nominations including Song of the Summer at the 2020 MTV Video Music Awards and Song of the Year at the 46th People's Choice Awards. Commercially, the song reached the top ten of charts in twenty-one countries, including a number one peak in Israel. This also included the UK Singles Chart, where the song peaked at number six. It also peaked at number 13 on the US Billboard Hot 100. The song is certified platinum or higher in ten countries, including a double diamond certification in Brazil, a diamond certification in France, a double platinum certification in Australia and a platinum certification in the UK.

The music video for "Break My Heart" premiered on 26 March 2020. It was directed by Henry Scholfield and filmed in Bulgaria. The video features 1990s-influenced slide clips that see Lipa in numerous situations going from vulnerable to empowered after she falls for someone who's pulling away from her. Some of these situations include running through a traffic-jammed block, dancing in a club and dancing on the end of a broken plane. Several critics praised the high quality of the video and its use of colour. It won Best Pop Video at the 2020 UK Music Video Awards. Lipa performed the song on numerous occasions, including on The Tonight Show Starring Jimmy Fallon, Big Brother Brasil 20 and Graduate Together. Several remixes including ones by Jax Jones, Joris Voorn and Moon Boots were also released.

== Writing and production ==
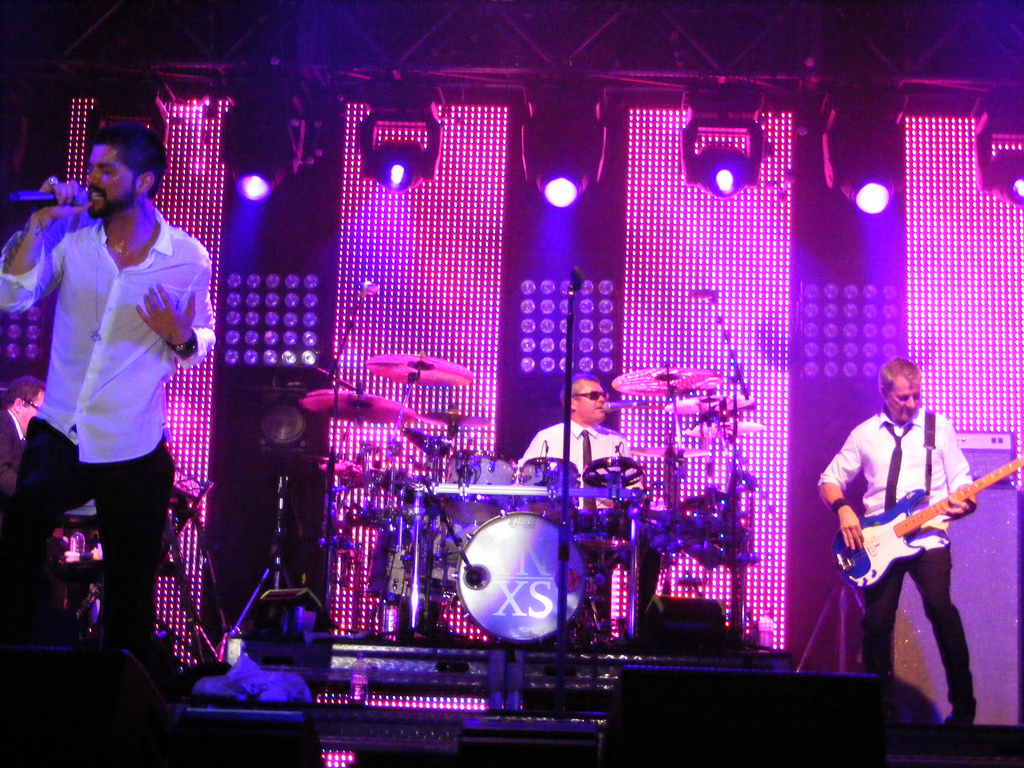
INXS were credited on "Break My Heart" after the song's writers noticed a similarity between it and the band's "Need You Tonight".

"Break My Heart" was written by Dua Lipa, Ali Tamposi, Andrew Watt, Stefan Johnson and Jordan K. Johnson and was produced by the Monsters & Strangerz alongside Watt. The Monsters & Strangerz had wanted to work with Lipa for a while and had their management contact Lipa's A&R, Joe Kentish, and manager Ben Mawson. Their management knew the latter from a previous Ellie Goulding collaboration. A studio session was arranged between The Monsters & Strangerz, Tamposi, and Lipa, which was successful; however, the Monsters & Strangerz thought that they would have a better session with Watt. A session was arranged with him at his studio. Lipa was nervous going into the session due to the fact that she had not worked with Watt. Lipa found it hard to be open and vulnerable with people she did not know. However, Lipa later realised it is easy to do so. She additionally found it helpful that the co-writers knew her boyfriend, which allowed Lipa to be more open. Lipa intended to create a song that was cohesive and had a theme running through it.

The session started with all the writers staring at a "disco" sign in Watt's studio. Whenever he worked with a new artist, Watt always recorded a simple guitar riff on his phone as place to start with them. He broke the ice with Lipa by playing her the sample. She expressed her admiration for it, but thought it was not for her. To give him an idea of her musical style, Lipa played Watt about half of her Future Nostalgia album which he described as "perfect". The collaborators were unsure where to begin with the song, ultimately deciding to start with the melody. They started with the guitar before Lipa began putting her thoughts into song form. Watt played a bass lick, inspired by what he equated to be "funky music". Lipa loved the sound and told him to record it; they later decided to synchronize the hook with the bass line. All writers had many ideas for the melody and helped write it. Lipa recalled needing the melody to make sense of writing the lyrics. She was inspired by the initial stages of falling in love but thinking in the back of one's mind, "this is too good to be true". Lipa recalled being out of her comfort zone while writing the song, but learning a lesson to write in that state as she writes the best songs then.

"Break My Heart" was written, tracked and produced in one night. Watt recalled that the collaborators were "on fire" and "nailed it" while also mentioning that Lipa "such a confident place" and she "brought it on another level". While listening back to the song, Lipa and her collaborators noticed a similarity between the song and "Need You Tonight" (1987) by Australian rock band INXS. The collaborators did not want to get sued, so band members Andrew Farriss and Michael Hutchence were credited as writers and INXS were given a publishing credit. Lipa admired this situation as it "brought nostalgia even more to the forefront" of the album. Farriss later expressed his appreciation for Lipa for asking for permission to use the interpolation while saying it is "kind of bizarre" to hear Lipa interpret it in that way. "Break My Heart" was recorded and tracked at Gold Tooth Music in Beverly Hills, California and Oddities Studio in London; the vocals were also recorded at the latter location. Mark "Spike" Stent mixed the song at the Mixsuite in Los Angeles with Dave Kutch mastering it at the Mastering Palace in New York. Chad Smith of the Red Hot Chili Peppers was brought in at the suggestion of Watt during the end of the recording session for the purpose of overdubbing live drums. Smith recalled that the song was nearly complete by the time that he arrived at the recording studio and included a programmed drum machine part. "This was just literally putting drums over a pretty finished track. There was some drum machine on it already, but they just wanted that kind of disco-funk thing."

== Music and lyrics ==
"Break My Heart"
A dance-pop and disco-funk song set to a Europop beat, "Break My Heart" sees Lipa questioning whether her new lover will leave her broken hearted over disco violins and a techno-adjacent bassline.

Musically, "Break My Heart" is a dance-pop and disco-funk song with house and 1980s elements. It has a length of 3:41 and is constructed in verse–chorus form. The song is composed in 4/4 time and the key of E minor, with a tempo of 113 beats per minute. The verses and choruses have a chord progression of Em–G–F♯dim–Em–C–Bm–D, while the bridges follow a Cmaj7–D6–Bm7–Em7–D6 sequence and the middle eight follows a C–D–G/B–Bm–Em–Bm/D–C–D–Em7–B7–B chord progression. The song interpolates the rhythm guitar melody from "Need You Tonight" by INXS. "Break My Heart" has a retro-futuristic sound, with the production consisting of a bouncing-ball bass, handclaps, a funk guitar line, disco violins, and a Europop beat.

"Break My Heart" opens with a bassline and synths, both of which were categorized as bouncy, and a hi-hat cymbal. In the pre-chorus, the song features a funky bassline and sweeping strings, while the music drops out in the middle and abruptly crashes back shortly after for the chorus. As the song eases into its chorus, the instruments are stripped back with a swaggering guitar riff underscoring each lyric, while a techno-adjacent bassline is also included, alongside a staccato bass rhythm. The second verse includes a drum kit and the second pre-chorus is driven by a string section. Lipa's vocals span a range of E_{3} to B_{4}, and she makes use of spoken word deliveries. Described by Lipa as a "celebration of vulnerability", "Break My Heart" sees her question whether a new love will leave her broken hearted. She tells a cautionary love tale and mentions the "shoulda, woulda, coulda's" of relationship choices. The lyrics of the chorus were compared to the COVID-19 pandemic's social distancing measures.

It's a perfect explanation of 'dance crying.' It's about finally being in a happy place and knowing this new person is amazing. But then thinking: 'Nothing else compares to this, and what if this ends and it breaks my heart?' [...] It's [sweet] and vulnerable, [because] you also see how much you care.

— Lipa speaking to Apple Music about the meaning of "Break My Heart".

== Release and promotion ==
It was first revealed that "Break My Heart" had been recorded for Future Nostalgia in January 2020, after the song leaked along with fellow album track "Physical". Later that month, the song was confirmed to be on the album's tracklist in the ninth position. Lipa confirmed that the song would serve as the third single from the album in March 2020, during an interview with Australian TV show Sunrise. She began teasing the release shortly thereafter. On 20 March 2020, Lipa announced that the song would be released a week later; however, Future Nostalgia leaked shortly thereafter, leading to the release of "Break My Heart" being pushed up. The song was released through Warner Records on 25 March 2020 for digital download and streaming, with it appearing on the album which was released two days later. "Break My Heart" was accompanied by a lyric video and Spotify vertical video, released on 9 and 25 April 2020, respectively. The song impacted contemporary hit radio formats in the United States on 31 March as well as adult contemporary radio on 27 April, serving as the album's second single in the US. It was released for radio airplay in Italy on 15 May 2020. In 2021, a sound pack for "Break My Heart" was included in GarageBand where users could create remixes for the song.

=== Animated video ===
Lipa collecting a jeweled heart in the animated music video

"Break My Heart" was accompanied by an animated video, which is a fullscreen version of the vertical video. It was directed by Marco Pavone and premiered via YouTube on 8 May 2020. The video is set as taking place in the Andromeda Galaxy on the fictional planet of BMH1. The visual opens with an animated Lipa flying into BMH1, a colourless and desolate planet. She wears a pink space suit, reminiscent of animated TV series Totally Spies!. Lipa is in search of a jeweled heart, which she finds in a cave. However, when she begins to leave, a giant robot appears and begins to attack her. Lipa eventually fights off the robot and flies away. Throughout the animated video, clips of Lipa falling from the sky into a city, wearing a pink outfit, are also shown.

=== Live performances ===
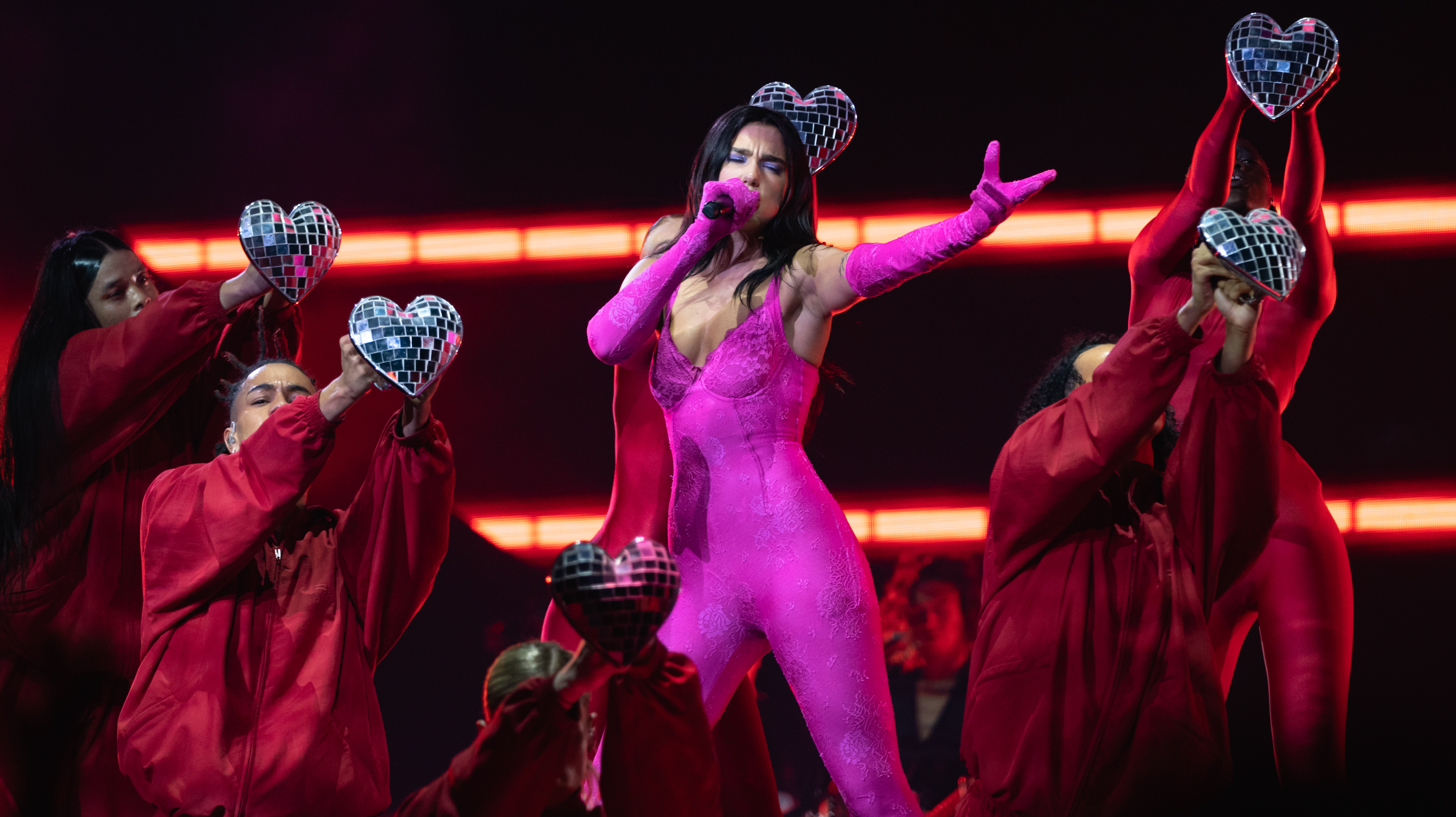
Lipa performing "Break My Heart" on the Future Nostalgia Tour in 2022

Lipa has promoted "Break My Heart" with multiple live performances. She first performed the song with a virtual performance for Amazon Music UK on 30 March 2020. Lipa also gave a virtual performance of the song for The Tonight Show Starring Jimmy Fallon on 8 April of that year. The performance featured Lipa sitting in front of a blank wall before the background started changing to city time-lapses and eventually to the Tonight Show set. On 22 April 2020, she virtually performed the song on Big Brother Brasil 20. Lipa performed the song for Graduate Together: America Honors the High School Class of 2020 on 16 May. Lipa performed an acoustic version of the song for the FIFA 21 world premiere on 1 October 2020. It was included on the setlist of Lipa's 2022 Future Nostalgia Tour.

=== Remixes ===
Several remixes of the song have also been released. The first remix was by Jax Jones, known as the Midnight Snack Remix, and released on 22 May 2020. It reimagines the track as a euphoric house song with funk-driven melodies and stomping basslines. On 29 May 2020, a remix of "Break My Heart" by Joris Voorn was released. It was accompanied by a music video, which was uploaded to Voorn's YouTube channel the same day. The video sees Voorn performing the remix on a rooftop. Remixes by Solardo and Moon Boots had respective releases on 12 June 2020. The "shimmery" and "funky" Moon Boots remix adds percussion, piano stabs and party sounds to the song, giving it "bounce". Lipa was scheduled to release a remix of the song featuring fans playing the instruments; however it went unreleased.

A remix by Moodymann and a mashup with the Dimitri from Paris dubwize remix of Jamiroquai's "Cosmic Girl", titled "Break My Heart / Cosmic Girl" (Dimitri from Paris Edit) appear on Lipa and the Blessed Madonna's DJ Mix-crafted remix album Club Future Nostalgia, released 28 August 2020, while the original Moodymann remix was released on 11 September 2020. The funkier mashup was created by the Blessed Madonna after Lipa mentioned that Jamiroquai was one of her reference points. Moodymann adjusts his sound to fit Lipa's on his remix, a modern dance and Detroit house track. The track makes us of a bass lick, cowbells, weird ambiance as well as clinking bottles and menacing laugh sound effects and looped vocals. The remix was placed as the tenth best dance song of 2020 by Billboard.

== Critical reception ==
Neil Z. Yeung of AllMusic praised the song's mix of inspirations, and Brittany Spanos from Rolling Stone labelled the INXS influence "bewitching". In a separate Rolling Stone review, Althea Legaspi called "Break My Heart" a "dance-driven song" whose "sentiment is soothed by a beat that aims for the dance floor". Idolator's Mike Nied wrote that the song adds "depth" to Lipa's discography, while calling it a "stone-cold bop". He continued, describing its beats as "deceptively bright", while viewing the song as "retro-inspired". Courteney Larocca and Callie Ahlgrim, writing for Business Insider Australia, praised the song's "polished" and "minimalistic" production. God Is in the TV's Jonathan Wright praised the song's bassline, calling it "spectacular", while Thomas Stichbury of Attitude stated that the bassline is "broody". Crack Magazine's Michael Cragg categorised Lipa's vocals on the song as "swollen".

Rob Harvilla of The Ringer highlighted "Break My Heart" as Future Nostalgia's lustiest track, and Bianca Gracie, for Billboard called it a "downright sexy jam". For Under the Radar, Conrad Duncan complimented it for playing to Lipa's strengths as a "fantastically sleek dance record for those who suspect they may be better off single rather than forcing love with people too immature to give or receive it". In the Gay Times, Daniel Megarry called the song "effortlessly cool" and stated it "culminates in one of the catchiest sure-to-be-hits of the year". Gigwise editor Jordan Emery complimented the sample saying it sounds "even more fun now than it ever did". Bailey Slater of Wonderland praised Lipa for tackling the subject of "romance and all its tribulations" in a "more hedonistic way than before", giving listeners the "well-needed hope and self-assurance that love isn't all doom and gloom after all".

Chris Willman of Variety compared the song's funk guitar line to the music of Chic, while musicOMH's Nick Smith compared the line to "Lovefool" (1996) by The Cardigans. The PopMatters staff gave mixed reviews, averaging "Break My Heart" at 5.67/10. Ian Rushbury gave a 5/10, calling it a "forgettable piece of airbrushed pop", while Jordan Blum rated the song 4/10, comparing it to "Just Give Me a Reason" (2013) by Pink, as well as calling it "unoriginal", "disposable", and "blatant plagiarism". Steve Horowitz provided the most positive review at PopMatters, giving the song an 8/10, praising its meaning and production. Jim Farber of Vogue opined that "Break My Heart" is a contender for song of the summer, viewing it as "exciting, catchy and totally danceable". In Time, Raisa Bruner wrote that the song is "bouncy and sparkling with a get-up-and-dance spirit".

== Accolades ==
"Break My Heart" placed on year-end, best of 2020 lists by numerous publications. Genius ranked it as the fourth best song of the year. Billboard hailed the song as 2020's tenth best song. That publication also placed the "Need You Tonight" interpolation as one of the best interpolations of the 21st century with writer Andrew Unterberger saying it "adds to both the anxiety and allure" of the song's hook. NPR placed it as 2020's 39th best song while writer Otis Hart ranked it at number two on his year-end list. In The New York Times, writer Jon Caramanica ranked it as the 29th best song of the year on his year-end list. "Break My Heart" also received numerous awards and nominations. It was nominated for Most Performed Australian Work and Most Performed Pop Work at the APRA Music Awards of 2021, Favorite International Hit at the 2020 Nickelodeon Meus Prêmios Nick, Global Hit at the 2020 MTV Millennial Awards Brazil, Song of Summer at the 2020 MTV Video Music Awards, and Song of the Year at the 46th People's Choice Awards. The song won an ASCAP Pop Music Award for Winning Songwriters at the 2021 ceremony as well as a 202 Hito Pop Music Award for Western Songs of the Year. It was awarded an iHeartRadio Titanium Award for receiving one billions spins on the station in the United States.

== Commercial performance ==
In the United Kingdom, "Break My Heart" debuted at number 76 on the UK Singles Downloads Chart dated 27 March 2020. The following week, it entered the UK Singles Chart at its peak position of number six, becoming Lipa's fifteenth entry on the chart and her ninth single to appear in the top ten. The song spent a total of 20 consecutive weeks on the chart, dropping out in August 2020. In January 2021, the song was certified platinum by the British Phonographic Industry (BPI) for selling 600,000 track-equivalent units in the United Kingdom. On the Irish Singles Chart, the song debuted at number three, its peak position, behind Lipa's previous single "Physical" (2020) and "Roses" (2019) by Saint Jhn. The song debuted at number 83 on the Scottish Singles Chart dated 27 March 2020, after only one day of tracking. It later peaked at number 14 on the chart four weeks later.

In Germany, "Break My Heart" reached number 26 while it peaked at number 56 in France. The song was awarded a diamond certification for selling 333,333 track-equivalent units in France, from the Syndicat National de l'Édition Phonographique (SNEP). In Australia, the song debuted at its peak position of number seven on the ARIA Singles Chart, becoming Lipa's sixth top ten entry on the chart. It spent two non-consecutive weeks in the position and spent 27 weeks on the chart. The song was awarded a double platinum certification from the Australian Recording Industry Association (ARIA) for selling 140,000 track-equivalent units. On the New Zealand singles chart, the song spent 20 weeks with a debut and peak of number 12. The Recorded Music NZ awarded the song a triple platinum certification for selling 90,000 track-equivalent units in New Zealand.

In the United States, "Break My Heart" debuted at number 21 on the Billboard Hot 100 chart dated 11 April 2020, Lipa's highest debut on the chart. In its 20th week on the chart, the song peaked at number 13, and left the chart 12 weeks later. The Recording Industry Association of America (RIAA) awarded the song a platinum certification for sales of 1,000,000 track-equivalent units in the US. On the Canadian Hot 100, "Break My Heart" debuted at number 47 in April 2020 and later peaked at number 13 in July of the year. For track-equivalent unit sales of 400,000 in Canada, the song was awarded a five times platinum certification from Music Canada. In Brazil, the song reached number 43 and was awarded a double diamond certification from Pro-Música Brasil for track-equivalent sales of 320,000 units. It also charted at number 23 on Brazil's April 2020 monthly streaming chart.

== Music video ==
=== Background and production ===
The accompanying music video for "Break My Heart" premiered via YouTube on the day after the song's release. It was directed by Henry Scholfield, who also directed Lipa's videos for "Lost in Your Light", "New Rules" (both 2017), and "IDGAF" (2018). The visual was shot in Bulgaria in January 2020 over the course of three days. It features slide clips that were inspired by the 1990s as well as a colour palette from the early works of Pedro Almodóvar and iridescent landscapes from Japanese hotels. During filming for the video, Lipa had a case of the flu. For creation of it, VFX, wire work, and a tilting set were used. The sets for the music video were built across three stages and designed by Mark Connell.

I wanted to create something that felt like that tumble dryer of emotions when falling for someone who's pulling away from you. Dua's performance was brilliant (as always!) taking us on her journey from vulnerable to empowered, via her playful cheeky-charming self.

— Director Henry Scholfield discussing the inspiration behind the video.

=== Synopsis ===
Lipa blowing a bubble with gum in the music video, while sitting on a car in a traffic-jammed city block

The music video begins with Lipa jumping on cars and walking through a traffic-jammed city block, while wearing a red jacket and black pants. The passengers in the cars are couples going through different parts of a relationship, with some kissing and some arguing. As she walks, one of the cars turns into a toy car being played with by a child outside of a man's vibrant, futuristic apartment. Lipa is then seen wearing a purple cardigan, black tights, white shoes and a skirt of the same colour. She walks into the man's apartment, struggling to maintain her balance in the apartment. This is a metaphor for Lipa being uncertain about whether her feelings are being reciprocated. After the scene, the apartment turns into a model boat on display in a neon-lit club, that tips to signify their relationship has taken a turn for the worse. In the club, Lipa observes various couples going through issues. She starts to dance on a disco floor in the middle of the restaurant before a wall explodes and she is sucked out.

Lipa lands on an airplane seat, followed by her getting up on the plane and walking to the back before it breaks in two. Lipa wears a pink wool jacket, and skirt with black lining, over a black shirt. She then begins to dance on the end of the plane before a life raft explodes on her, leading to Lipa waking up in a bed with a confused partner. She is seen wearing a pink Bambi wool sweater with white pants. Lipa runs scared into the bathroom, picking up her shoes, and beds with other men begin cycling through in the background. She then falls into the bathtub, which turns into a frothy pink martini that one of Lipa's backup dancers is holding while she dances on a bar couch. Lipa wears a Mirror Palais cropped red shirt and red and white checked tweed mini skirt. The music video concludes by looking at all the previous scenes and undoing some of the transitions, before Lipa blows a bubble gum sitting on a car from the first scene.

=== Reception ===
Shannon Miller of The A.V. Club called the visual a "colorful music video punctuated with mind-bending effects and LED-lit sets". Rushbury labelled it a "multi-million-dollar remake" of the video for "Common People" (1995) by Pulp, writing that the clip has "snazzy visuals and couture outfits". In Soundigest, Kenly Campos wrote that the video is "extremely well-made" with its "colorful outfits and bubbly choreography". Callie Ahlgrim of Insider described the video as "Lipa serving a variety of retro looks, dancing her cares away, and cycling through suitors in a surreal dreamscape." NME's Tom Skinner branded the visual "eye-popping" and "location-hopping". Writing for Idolator, Mike Wass called the sets "candy-colored", the choreography "laissez-faire", and wrote "Dua treats us to look after look, sullen glances".

The "Break My Heart" music video was ranked as the 22nd best music video of 2020 by Billboard while Insider ranked it at number 32 on their year-end list for music videos. The video was a winning video at the 2020 MTV Video Play Awards, won International Female Video at the 2020 MTV Video Music Awards Japan and was nominated for Best International Video at the 2020 MVPA Awards. At the UK Music Video Awards, the video won for Best Pop Video, and was nominated for Best Colour Grading in a Video in association with CHEAT, and Best Visual Effects in a Video at the 2020 UK Music Video Awards.

== Track listings ==
- Digital download and streaming
1. "Break My Heart" – 3:41
- Digital download and streaming – Jax Jones Midnight Snack remix
1. "Break My Heart" (Jax Jones Midnight Snack remix) – 3:43
- Digital download and streaming – Jax Jones Midnight Snack remix – Austrian, German and Swiss version
1. "Break My Heart" (Jax Jones Midnight Snack remix) – 3:43
2. "Break My Heart" – 3:41
- Digital download and streaming – Joris Voorn remix
1. "Break My Heart" (Joris Voorn remix) – 6:32
- Digital download and streaming – Joris Voorn remix – Austrian, German and Swiss version / Spotify single
1. "Break My Heart" (Joris Voorn remix) – 6:32
2. "Break My Heart" – 3:41
- Digital download and streaming – Solardo remix
1. "Break My Heart" (Solardo remix) – 7:16
- Digital download and streaming – Moon Boots remix
1. "Break My Heart" (Moon Boots remix) – 2:59
- Streaming – Moon Boots remix – Spotify single
1. "Break My Heart" (Moon Boots remix) – 2:59
2. "Break My Heart" – 3:41
- Digital download and streaming – Moon Boots extended remix
1. "Break My Heart" (Moon Boots extended remix) – 4:46
- Digital download and streaming – Moodymann remix
1. "Break My Heart" (Moodymann remix) – 5:52

== Personnel ==
- Dua Lipa – vocals
- Andrew Watt – production, backing vocals, guitar, keyboards, tambourine, programming, instrumentation
- The Monsters & Strangerz – production, keyboards, programming, instrumentation
- Gian Stone – vocal production
- Chad Smith – drums
- Paul Lamalfa – engineering
- Matt Wolach – assistant mix engineering
- Michael Freeman – assistant mix engineering
- Mark "Spike" Stent – mixing
- Dave Kutch – mastering

== Charts ==
=== Weekly charts ===
Weekly chart performance
Chart (2020–2021)	Peak position
Argentina Hot 100 (Billboard)	25
Australia (ARIA)	7
Austria (Ö3 Austria Top 40)	20
Belgium (Ultratop 50 Flanders)	14
Belgium (Ultratop 50 Wallonia)	8
Bolivia (Monitor Latino)	7
Brazil (Top 100 Brasil)	43
Canada Hot 100 (Billboard)	13
Canada AC (Billboard)	13
Canada CHR/Top 40 (Billboard)	3
Canada Hot AC (Billboard)	3
CIS Airplay (TopHit)	1
Colombia (National-Report)	55
Costa Rica (Monitor Latino)	17
Croatia International Airplay (Top lista)	2
Czech Republic Airplay (ČNS IFPI)	2
Czech Republic Singles Digital (ČNS IFPI)	7
Denmark (Tracklisten)	22
Ecuador (Monitor Latino)	11
Estonia (Eesti Tipp-40)	6
Euro Digital Song Sales (Billboard)	10
Finland (Suomen virallinen lista)	15
France (SNEP)	56
Germany (GfK)	26
Global 200 (Billboard) (Note: The Billboard Global 200 chart was launched in September 2020. Therefore, "Break My Heart" did not have a full run on the chart.)	47
Greece (IFPI)	7
Hungary (Dance Top 40)	9
Hungary (Rádiós Top 40)	2
Hungary (Single Top 40)	12
Hungary (Stream Top 40)	6
Iceland (Tónlistinn)	8
Ireland (IRMA)	3
Israel (Media Forest)	1
Italy (FIMI)	21
Japan Hot Overseas (Billboard)	13
Lithuania (AGATA)	2
Lebanon (Lebanese Top 20)	6
Malaysia (RIM)	18
Mexico (Billboard Mexican Airplay)	4
Netherlands (Dutch Top 40)	2
Netherlands (Single Top 100)	12
New Zealand (Recorded Music NZ)	12
Norway (VG-lista)	20
Panama (PRODUCE)	28
Paraguay (Monitor Latino)	8
Poland Airplay (ZPAV)	2
Portugal (AFP)	19
Portugal Airplay (AFP)	15
Puerto Rico (Monitor Latino)	5
Romania (Airplay 100)	42
Russia Airplay (TopHit)	1
Scottish Singles Sales (Official Charts)	14
Singapore (RIAS)	9
Slovakia Airplay (ČNS IFPI)	18
Slovakia Singles Digital (ČNS IFPI)	7
Slovenia (SloTop50)	5
South Korea (Gaon)	165
Spain (Promusicae)	22
Sweden (Sverigetopplistan)	21
Switzerland (Schweizer Hitparade)	18
Ukraine Airplay (TopHit)	166
UK Singles (Official Charts)	6
US Billboard Hot 100	13
US Adult Contemporary (Billboard)	4
US Adult Pop Airplay (Billboard)	2
US Dance Airplay (Billboard)	2
US Pop Airplay (Billboard)	1
US Rhythmic Airplay (Billboard)	40
US Rolling Stone Top 100	11
Venezuela (Record Report)	58

Weekly chart performance
Chart (2022)	Peak position
CIS Airplay (TopHit)	163
Russia Airplay (TopHit)	149

Weekly chart performance
Chart (2023)	Peak position
Estonia Airplay (TopHit)	187
Kazakhstan Airplay (TopHit)	100
Lithuania Airplay (TopHit)	157

Weekly chart performance
Chart (2024)	Peak position
Moldova Airplay (TopHit)	67

=== Monthly charts ===
Monthly chart performance
Chart (2020)	Peak position
Brazil Streaming (Pro-Música Brasil)	23
CIS Airplay (TopHit)	3
Czech Republic (Rádio Top 100)	7
Czech Republic (Singles Digitál Top 100)	18
Russia Airplay (TopHit)	3
Slovakia (Rádio Top 100)	21
Slovakia (Singles Digitál Top 100)	9

=== Year-end charts ===
Year-end chart performance
Chart (2020)	Position
Argentina Airplay (Monitor Latino)	29
Australia (ARIA)	31
Belgium (Ultratop Flanders)	29
Belgium (Ultratop Wallonia)	27
Brazil Airplay (Crowley)	97
Croatia International Airplay (Top lista)	17
CIS Airplay (TopHit)	25
Canada (Canadian Hot 100)	35
Denmark (Tracklisten)	91
France (SNEP)	122
Hungary (Dance Top 40)	38
Hungary (Rádiós Top 40)	19
Hungary (Single Top 40)	50
Hungary (Stream Top 40)	26
Iceland (Tónlistinn)	29
Ireland (IRMA)	32
Italy (FIMI)	92
Netherlands (Dutch Top 40)	15
Netherlands (Single Top 100)	50
Poland (ZPAV)	35
Russia Airplay (TopHit)	21
Sweden (Sverigetopplistan)	98
Switzerland (Schweizer Hitparade)	70
UK Singles (OCC)	43
US Billboard Hot 100	33
US Adult Contemporary (Billboard)	30
US Adult Top 40 (Billboard)	9
US Dance/Mix Show Airplay (Billboard)	6
US Mainstream Top 40 (Billboard)	5

Year-end chart performance
Chart (2021)	Position
CIS Airplay (TopHit)	136
Global 200 (Billboard)	181
Hungary (Dance Top 40)	53
Hungary (Rádiós Top 40)	74
Russia Airplay (TopHit)	133
US Adult Contemporary (Billboard)	9

Year-end chart performance
Chart (2022)	Position
Hungary (Dance Top 40)	71

== Certifications ==
Certifications and sales
Region	Certification	Certified units/sales
Australia (ARIA)	2× Platinum	140,000^{‡}
Austria (IFPI Austria)	Platinum	30,000^{‡}
Belgium (BRMA)	Platinum	40,000^{‡}
Brazil (Pro-Música Brasil)	3× Diamond	480,000^{‡}
Canada (Music Canada)	5× Platinum	400,000^{‡}
Denmark (IFPI Danmark)	Platinum	90,000^{‡}
France (SNEP)	Diamond	333,333^{‡}
Germany (BVMI)	Gold	200,000^{‡}
Italy (FIMI)	Platinum	70,000^{‡}
New Zealand (RMNZ)	3× Platinum	90,000^{‡}
Norway (IFPI Norway)	2× Platinum	120,000^{‡}
Poland (ZPAV)	4× Platinum	200,000^{‡}
Portugal (AFP)	2× Platinum	20,000^{‡}
Spain (Promusicae)	2× Platinum	120,000^{‡}
United Kingdom (BPI)	2× Platinum	1,200,000^{‡}
United States (RIAA)	4× Platinum	4,000,000^{‡}
^{‡} Sales+streaming figures based on certification alone.

== Release history ==
Release dates and formats
Region	Date	Format(s)	Version	Label(s)	Ref.
Various	25 March 2020	Digital download; streaming	Original	Warner	
United States	31 March 2020	Contemporary hit radio	Original	Warner	
United States	27 April 2020	Adult contemporary radio	Original	Warner	
Italy	15 May 2020	Radio airplay	Original	Warner	
Various	22 May 2020	Digital download; streaming	Jax Jones Midnight Snack remix	Warner	
Various	29 May 2020	Digital download; streaming	Joris Voorn remix	Warner	
Various	12 June 2020	Digital download; streaming	Solardo remix	Warner	
Various	12 June 2020	Digital download; streaming	Moon Boots remixes	Warner	
Various	11 September 2020	Digital download; streaming	Moodymann remix	Warner	

== See also ==
- List of top 10 singles in 2020 (Australia)
- List of Billboard Mainstream Top 40 number-one songs of 2020
- List of UK top-ten singles in 2020
- List of most-streamed songs on Spotify
