= Lip Service (game show) =

1993–1994 American game show

Lip Service is a game show that aired on MTV from February 22, 1992, to January 3, 1993, and again from May 10, 1993, to December 17, 1994. It was hosted originally by Jay Mohr, who was followed in the position by John Ales. Both hosts were joined by a rap-style disc jockey, either Spinderella (from Salt 'N Pepa), Monie Love, or Yo! MTV Raps regular T-Money.

In each episode, two three-member teams, representing different U.S. colleges and universities, competed in a three-round lip-sync contest. Three judges evaluated the teams' efforts, each focusing on a separate aspect: accuracy, body mechanics (later changed to "sass"), and overall performance.

== Gameplay ==
=== Deadly Medley ===
Excerpts from three songs were played on a team's turn, with a different member performing each one. The teams were not informed of the songs or their order ahead of time. Judges scored the teams on a scale of 1-10, with a potential maximum score of 30, and the higher-scoring team won a prize.

=== Flip-Sync ===
Each team was assigned a song and given its lyrics shortly before the start of this round. The video for the song was played, with the vocal track muted, and the three members took turns singing. The Deadly Medley scoring rules were used, and the team with the higher score from this round won a prize.

=== Scratch Factor ===
Each team put on a lip-sync performance to a song chosen for them to rehearse and choreograph ahead of time. As the song played, the DJ would try to sabotage their performance in various ways (scratching the record, changing the playback speed, running the record backwards, etc.) and the team had to react to these changes. Judges assigned scores on a scale of 1-20 (later 10-20) for a maximum of 60 points.

The team with the higher total score after this round won the day's grand prize, usually a trip, and advanced in a season-long tournament whose winner would be featured in an MTV music video.

== See also ==
- Great Pretenders
- Lip Sync Battle
- Puttin' on the Hits
