= List of presidents of programming of MTV =

MTV originally aired music videos as guided by television personalities known as "video jockeys" (VJs), but in the years since its inception, the network significantly toned down its focus on music in favor of original reality programming targeting teenagers and young adults.

== List of presidents of programming ==
- Robert Pittman - Pittman was the CEO of MTV Networks and the cofounder and programmer who led the team that created MTV. At MTV, he oversaw the creation and growth of MTV and the transition of Nickelodeon from a failing network geared to preschoolers to the highest rated channel aimed at older kids as well as overseeing the launches of VH-1 and Nick at Nite, and led the initial public offering for MTV Networks and its expansion into international markets. Under Pittman's leadership, MTV became the first profitable cable network; then-Time Warner Co-Chairman and Co-Chief Executive Officer Steve Ross also noted that MTV became the most profitable basic cable network during Pittman's tenure there. For his development of the MTV brand, Advertising Age selected Pittman in 2010 as one of the ten most influential marketers who transformed American Culture.
- Les Garland - After Atlantic Records, Garland moved back to the east coast becoming the programming head of MTV: Music Television, the world's first 24-hour music channel. While at MTV, Garland set celebrity profiles for ad guru Dale Pon's anthemic "I Want My MTV" marketing campaign. Along with founder, Robert Pittman, serving as MTV Network's Senior Executive Vice President, Garland was executive producer of the first six MTV Video Music Awards and oversaw all elements of programming. He was on the lead team that globalized the MTV brand with distribution into Europe, Asia and Australia. During his time at MTV he was asked to be the DJ voice embedded in the classic hit "We Built This City" by Starship. This impromptu stunt immortalized his voice as the things DJ dreams are made of, while Garland calls it his first number one song.
- Sam Kaiser
- Doug Herzog - As a senior manager at MTV, he was responsible for MTV News, Camp MTV, The Real World, Road Rules, Beavis and Butt-Head, The MTV Movie Awards, and The MTV Video Music Awards.
- Andy Schuon
- Brian Graden - In November 1997, Graden was promoted to executive vice president of programming at MTV following the abrupt resignation of Andy Schuon. Graden is the former President of Programming at MTV, VH1, CMT, and the LGBT channel, Logo, the launch of which he assisted in. He departed MTV Networks in late 2009.
- Lois Curren
- Tony DiSanto - From June 2009 through January 2010, DiSanto served as the President of Programming at MTV, supervising the development and production of all series, specials, and feature films for television. During his tenure as President, the network's ratings rose 30 percent with reality hits such as Teen Mom, 16 and Pregnant and Jersey Shore, three of the highest rated shows in cable television in 2010. DiSanto also ushered in a return to scripted programming at the channel with The Hard Times of RJ Berger, Teen Wolf and Skins, the latter two of which launched in 2011. Disanto is credited as an executive producer for the former MTV and now, VH1 series Scream. DiSanto began his career as an intern at MTV. He graduated to directing commercial spots, music videos, and electronic press kits for bands. By 2003, as Head of Production, DiSanto was supervising special events as well as creating and executive producing shows. DiSanto's early efforts include creating Say What? Karaoke and Global Groove, and co-creating Total Request Live with Carson Daly.
- David Janollari
- Susanne Daniels
- Michael Klein
- Nina L. Diaz - Diaz worked for MTV for 10 years, developing and launching My Super Sweet 16, MTV Cribs, and came up with idea for The Osbournes show on the set of Cribs. She left MTV to work as an independent producer for various networks, and helped develop hits such as Mob Wives on VH1 and Real Housewives of New Jersey on Bravo. Diaz was hired by VH1 in 2014, where she served as Senior Vice President of East Coast Development. Diaz was hired as executive vice president of unscripted Programming and Development for MTV and VH1 in June 2016, then was promoted to head of unscripted programming in November 2016, and served in that position until April 2018. Her focus was shifting the networks towards creating more unscripted television shows, which increased viewership greatly. She has overseen the programming schedule, and helped develop or grow Love and Hip Hop, Stevie J & Joseline, Martha and Snoop’s Potluck Dinner Party, Black Ink Crew, Hip Hop Squares and a reboot of America’s Next Top Model. She helped develop extensions to popular previously canceled shows such as Teen Mom: Young and Pregnant, TRL, The Challenge: Champs vs. Pros and Jersey Shore Family Vacation. She helped create the U.S. version of Ex on the Beach, which had the biggest premier of any unscripted show since 2014. In 2017, she oversaw the creation of Floribama Shore and Siesta Key, which were the second and fourth new shows for the year, respectively. In April 2018, she was promoted to the President of Programming and Development for VH1, MTV, and Logo Group.

== See also ==
- List of programs broadcast by MTV
