= Adario Strange =

American film director, writer and artist

Adario Strange is a New York–based writer, film director, and artist. He is best known for his documentary film The NYU Suicides detailing a year of strange deaths at the famed university. In recent years he was Editor-in-Chief of the weekly newspaper New York Press, and a technology writer for Wired, the SyFy channel, and PC Magazine.

Strange was born and raised in the East Village in New York City, NY, United States. Many in the entertainment industry also know him for his work as one of the original writers and second Editor-in-Chief of The Source hip hop magazine. He also became a well-known New York radio personality at New York's Hot 97 WQHT FM, WBAU FM, and WLIB AM, as well as a record producer for Tupac Shakur.

Strange also worked behind-the-scenes with Public Enemy's Bomb Squad production team with Hank Shocklee and Bill Stephney's Sound of Urban Listeners music label (aka S.O.U.L. Records) through MCA Records. In 1995, Strange published two issues of The Nü School, a Fort Greene, Brooklyn based magazine dedicated to poetry and jazz music. In 2001, Strange appeared in The New York Times as a leader of the digital music MP3 movement heading up FreeListen.com. Later in 2001, Strange released the book The Art of Secrets: Pirates, Robots, & Beats, a compilation of his early The Source technology columns.

Strange has appeared as a guest discussing youth culture and technology on ABC's World News Tonight, CBS News, and PBS, and in the pages of The New York Times, The New York Daily News, Crain's New York Business and Billboard Magazine.

== Filmography ==
- Hikikomori, Tokyo Plastic (2004)
- The NYU Suicides (2005)
- Bjork Vs. THX-1138 (Music Video) (2006)

== Discography ==
=== Digital Underground ===
- "Hip Hop Online" (1997) producer

=== Tupac Shakur ===
- "Who Do You Luv?" (1994) producer

=== The Original Heads ===
- "For The Record" (SWM Recordings 1992) featuring Bobbito Garcia and Sincere Thompson
- "Counterfeit" (SWM Recordings 1992)
- "Nuff Said" (SWM Recordings 1992) featuring Da Ghetto Communicator

== See also ==
- New York Press
- The Source
- Web 2.0
- Wired Magazine
