= WHPC =

- Garden City, New York; United States
- Broadcast area: Nassau County, New York
- Frequency: 90.3 MHz (HD Radio)
- Branding: 90.3 WHPC

Programming
- Format: Variety

Ownership
- Owner: Nassau Community College

History
- First air date: October 27, 1972
- Call sign meaning: "Helping People Communicate"

Technical information
- Licensing authority: FCC
- Facility ID: 47429
- Class: A
- ERP: 500 watts (analog); 50 watts (digital)
- HAAT: 65 meters (213 ft)
- Transmitter coordinates: 40°43′47″N 73°35′33″W

Links
- Public license information: Public file; LMS
- Webcast: Listen live
- Website: www.nccradio.org

WHPC (90.3 FM) is a college radio station licensed by the Federal Communications Commission (FCC) to Garden City, New York. The station is owned and operated by Nassau Community College, and began broadcasting on October 27, 1972.

== Awards ==
WHPC was nominated for "Best College Radio Station" at the 2019 and 2022 National Association of Broadcasters Marconi Awards, the only community college station to receive the honor that year.

WHPC won three awards at the 2018 Intercollegiate Broadcasting System awards: Best On-Air Schedule, Best Sports Report, and Best Training Manual.

WHPC won five awards at the 2019 Intercollegiate Broadcasting System awards: Best Community College radio station in the nation, Best Morning Show (for "The Nassau Morning Madhouse"), Best Artist/Celebrity Interview (Herb Alpert, interview by Michael Anthony), Best On-Air Schedule, and Best Public Affairs Show (Your Family's Health).

WHPC won seven awards at the 2021 Intercollegiate Broadcasting System awards: Best Community College radio station in the NATION, the Abraham & Borst Best Overall College Radio Station, Best Morning Show (for "The Nassau Morning Madhouse"), Best Station ID, Best Underwriting Announcement, Best Use of Social Media, and Best College Radio Station Advisor (Shawn Novatt.)

WHPC won numerous 2022, 2023, 2024 and 2025 Intercollegiate Broadcasting System awards, and is nominated for 14 more in 2026.

WHPC has also won the "Best Radio Station" award from the Fourleaf Best of Long Island awards for five years in a row, from 2022-2026.

== See also ==
- College radio
- List of college radio stations in the United States
- WBAU — defunct student radio station owned by Adelphi University that shared WHPC's frequency from 1972 to 1995.
