= Serge Bramly =

French-language writer and essayist

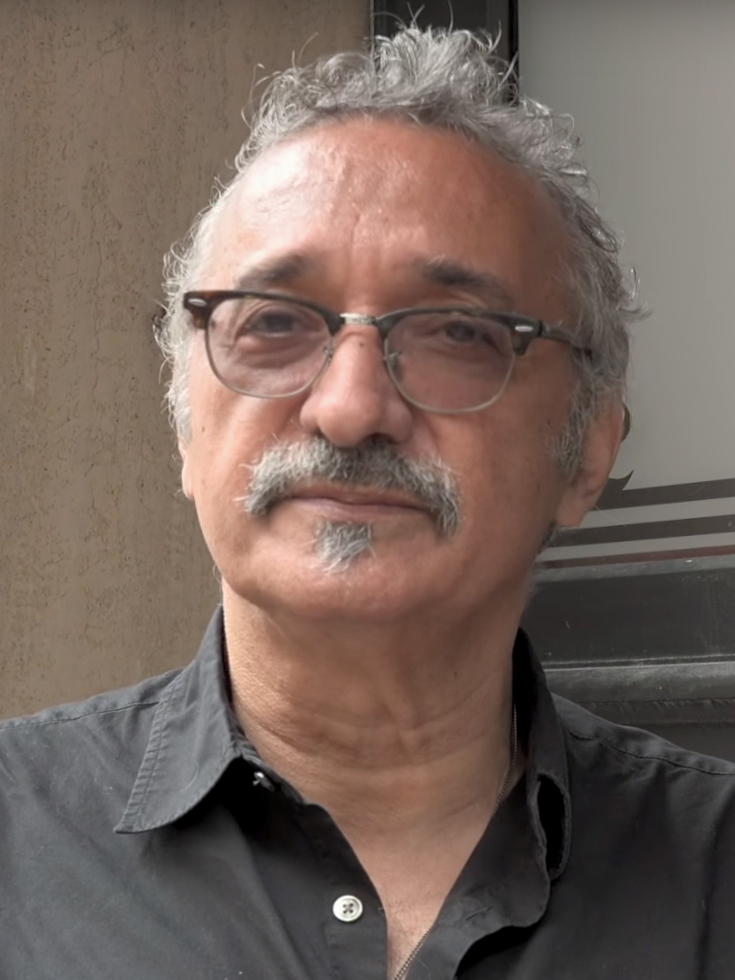
- Born: Serge Bramly; 31 January 1949 (age 77); Tunis, French Tunisia
- Occupations: Writer; poet; essayist; photographer

Serge Bramly (born 31 January 1949) is a French writer, essayist and art critic.

== Biography ==
He was born into a Jewish family in Tunis, Tunisia. When he was ten years old, his family emigrated to France. He went to school at the Lycée Janson de Sailly in Paris. His sister is Sophie Bramly, the Paris-based photographer and filmmaker. He was married to French photographer Bettina Rheims, with whom he has collaborated frequently, and had a son, Virgile. His novel La terreur dans le boudoir was adapted by Benoît Jacquot for the 2000 French film Sade. He is also noted for his books on Leonardo da Vinci and the Mona Lisa—Leonardo: Discovering the Life of Leonardo da Vinci, 1991 Leonardo: The Artist and the Man (1995), and Mona Lisa: The Enigma (2005). In 2008 he won the prix Interallié for his novel Le Premier Principe - Le Second Principe.

== Bibliography ==
- Terre Wakan, Robert Laffont, essay 1974
- Macumba, forces noires du Brésil, essay. Seghers, 1975, Editions Albin Michel, 1981
- Rudolf Steiner: prophète de l'homme nouveau, Retz, 1976, ISBN 978-2-7256-0064-2
- L'Itinéraire du fou, Flammarion, 1978
- Un Piège à Lumière, Flammarion, 1979, ISBN 978-2-08-064213-4
- Man Ray, essay. Pierre Belfond, 1980
- Le livre des dates, essay, Ramsay, 1981
- La Danse du loup, Belfond, 1982,
- Léonard de Vinci, éditions Lattès, 1988, LCCN 89-145399, OCLC 20854932
- Le Grand cheval de Léonard : le projet monumental de Léonard de Vinci, Adam Biro, 1990, ISBN 978-2-87660-096-6
- Terre sacrée, Editions Albin Michel, 1992
- Madame Satan, Grasset, 1992, ISBN 978-2-246-37471-8
- Walter Carone Photographe, Lattès, 1992, ISBN 978-2-7096-1165-7
- La Terreur dans le boudoir, Grasset, 1994, ISBN 978-2-246-48931-3 screen adaptation by Benoît Jacquot in 2001
- Le Réseau Melchior, Lattès, 1996, ISBN 978-2-7096-1728-4
- Anonym, Kehayoff, Munich, 1996, ISBN 978-3929078305 (in German, Forward translated by Marietta Piekenbrock)
- INRI, texte de Bramly, photographs by Bettina Rheims, éditions Monacelli Press, 2000, ISBN 978-1-58093-043-7
- Ragots, Plon, 2001, ISBN 978-2-259-18627-8
- Shanghai, Laffont, 2003, text by Bramly, photographs by Bettina Rheims, ISBN 978-2-221-09996-4
- Le Premier Principe - Le Second Principe, éditions Lattès, 2008, Prix Interallié, ISBN 978-2-7096-2769-6
