= Sade (film) =

- Film poster
- Directed by: Benoît Jacquot
- Written by: Serge Bramly (novel); Jacques Fieschi
- Produced by: Patrick Godeau
- Starring: Daniel Auteuil; Marianne Denicourt; Jeanne Balibar; Grégoire Colin; Isild Le Besco; Jean-Pierre Cassel
- Cinematography: Benoît Delhomme
- Edited by: Luc Barnier
- Distributed by: Océan Films
- Release date: 23 August 2000
- Running time: 100 minutes
- Country: France
- Language: French
- Budget: $8.5 million
- Box office: $3.4 million

Sade is a 2000 French film directed by Benoît Jacquot, adapted by Jacques Fieschi and Bernard Minoret from the novel La terreur dans le boudoir by Serge Bramly.

== Plot ==
Paris in 1794: After prolonged detention, the Marquis de Sade (Daniel Auteuil), who claims during the hearing to be neither noble nor the author of the novel Justine, is incarcerated with other nobles in a prison which was formerly a monastery in Picpus.

== Cast ==
- Daniel Auteuil – Marquis de Sade
- Marianne Denicourt – Marie-Constance Quesnet / Sensible
- Jeanne Balibar – Madame Santero
- Grégoire Colin – Fournier
- Isild Le Besco – Emilie de Lancris
- Jean-Pierre Cassel – Le vicomte de Lancris
- Dominique Reymond – Madame de Lancris
- Sylvie Testud – Renée de Sade
- Philippe Duquesne – Coignard
- François Levantal – Latour

== Production ==
Filming took place at the Abbaye Saint-Martin de Sées in Sées (Orne).

In her book Dire vrai, Isild Le Besco accused Benoît Jacquot of raping her when she was only 16 years old, on the set of this film.

== See also ==
- Quills (film) was an English-language film covering similar subject matter, released the same year.
