= Camp Scatico =

Camp in Hudson Valley, New York State

Camp Scatico is a brother-sister sleep-away camp for boys and girls located in the upper Hudson Valley of New York State, in the hamlet of Elizaville, which is in the town of Gallatin in Columbia County. It was established in 1921.

== History ==
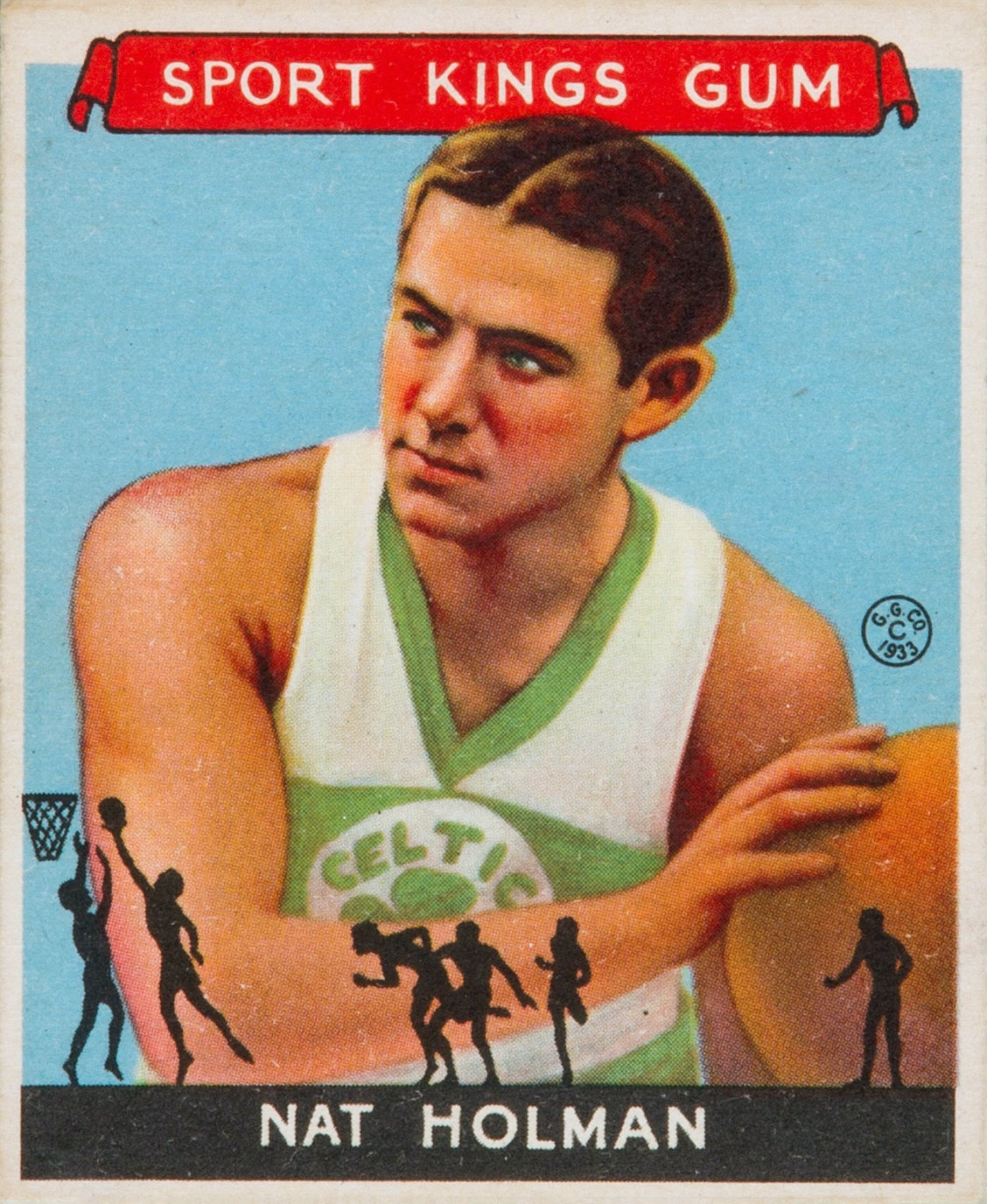
Nat Holman depicted in a bubble-gum card from the 1920s

Camp Scatico has been in operation since 1921. It was founded by Nat Holman of the Original Celtics. Holman sold the camp to his niece Ruth (1921–2011) and her husband Irwin “Flick” Fleischner (1922–2004) in 1964, and the camp is currently owned and operated by their son David Fleischner, his wife Diana Wallerstein, and their daughters Audrey and Nicki Fleischner. It is the site where Camp MTV was taped, which aired Sunday, July 30, 1989. The name "Scatico" was influenced by the Schaghticoke people.

== Notables ==
A substantial number of the camp's attendees have achieved enormous success. Notables who attended the camp include four-time Olympic fencer Daniel Bukantz, singer Lesley Gore, Hollywood financier Mordecai Wiczyk, businessman Marvin Davis, actor Cornel Wilde, Senator Paul S. Sarbanes, Online Influencer Julia Mervis, author Erica Jong, Judge Wilfred Feinberg, comedians Julie Klausner and Modi Rosenfeld, movie director and screenwriter Zak Penn, sportscaster Jimmy Roberts, record executives James Diener and Len Fichtelberg, writer-producer-director Scott Goldstein, and songwriter Carole Bayer Sager,
