= Camp MTV =

1989 television special

Camp MTV is a 6-hour special (including commercials and music videos) produced by MTV that aired on that channel Sunday, July 30, 1989. MTV's then-current personalities invaded Camp Scatico, a brother-sister sleep-away camp in Columbia County of New York state. During the special, the film UHF, which was about to be released by Orion Pictures, was promoted. It was the brainchild of executive Doug Herzog, who was the vice president of programming at the time. Scatico was chosen because Herzog attended the camp during the 1970s.

== Segments ==
The special's segments, not including repeated interstitials, were as follows:

=== Hour 1 ===
- Randee of the Redwoods announces that camp has begun by raising the Camp MTV flag and then by performing air guitar while Jimi Hendrix’s rendition of “The Star-Spangled Banner” is heard.
- Adam Curry welcomes viewers to Camp MTV in the radio shack and gives a rundown of things to come. Afterward, he introduces the song “Hey, Ladies” by the Beastie Boys.
- Camp director “Weird Al” Yankovic opens Camp MTV with the assembled campers and staff in the dining hall, and Stanley Spadowski wants to go hiking. No one else wants to go, so Al offers to take everyone out for banana-slug burritos.
- Colin Quinn, John Ten Eyck, Mario Joyner, and Chris Connelly discuss tattoos in their bunk. Ken Ober arrives, personal assistant in tow (played by a camper whose name was misspelled in the article that appeared in The Times Union—see reference #1), and shakes things up.
- Ken settles in and is welcomed by Al and Stanley.
- Kevin Seal lectures about fire safety and introduces Ranger Bob (also Ten Eyck) to some counselors. The lecture's boring, so it's drowned out by loud music and a crawl at the bottom of the screen.
- Victoria Jackson discusses bugs with a hockey-masked maniac.

=== Hour 2 ===
- Adam and Ken, all but set to win the 3-legged marathon, are interviewed by Kevin at the end of the race and are upset by a pair of campers. Kevin promises to interview the winners, but it never happens.
- Colin discusses activities that are against the rules. They lead to punishment in the Hard-Time Box—which turns out to be quite luxurious.
- Ken, Mario, and Colin discuss their love of camp and the hardships they suffer at home.
- In the radio shack, Adam talks about a mosquito problem and introduces the song “18 & Life” by Skid Row.
- Ed Lover, Doctor Dré, Randee, Ken, Mario, Colin, and Chris discuss the women of MTV while stuck in a rowboat.
- Victoria and Angela discuss boys at the girls’ waterfront.

=== Hour 3 ===
- Two Jasons—Mario and Randee—realize that they're in each other's movies because of a scheduling mistake.
- Victoria rhymes with Ed and Dré.
- Ranger Bob discusses snake bites and faints from one that he suffers.
- In the radio shack, Adam discusses rats, the counselors’ bunks, and a toilet-paper shortage. Then, he introduces the song “What You Don’t Know” by Exposé.
- In the arts-and-crafts shack, Randee makes a paperweight while Ed, Dré, and some campers watch.
- Chris discusses film theory and Sergei Eisenstein with campers—and then introduces a clip from UHF.

=== Hour 4 ===
- A visit to Chez Mario's Kitchen, which prepares inedible food.
- Ranger Bob has fun with a bear on the potty and its droppings.
- Al and Stanley go fishing.
- Martians land in Grover's Corners, à la Orson Welles, and possess Adam in the radio shack. He becomes Lorgin, who introduces the song “So Alive” by Love and Rockets.
- Ed, Dré, Mario, and Ken play basketball with some young campers and win by cheating, announcing that Downtown Julie Brown has come to camp.
- Angela answers questions about boys for Alicia Coppola (billed as Allicia Coppola) and some Club MTV dancers.

=== Hour 5 ===
- Doctor Al defends the radical surgical techniques that he learned at the Sore-Bonie after removing a camper's eye with a bug in it.
- Head counselor Mario confronts Al about the radical surgical techniques he learned at the Sore-Bonnie, complete with a different pronunciation of the place from the previous segment.
- Colin, Ken, and Mario make deals to acquire contraband items, such as soft toilet paper.
- Smelly sneakers and a funeral for a group of campers who tried to escape make for another round of announcements from Adam in the radio shack, who then introduces the song “Express Yourself” by Madonna Ciccone.
- Play rehearsal with Kevin, who hopes that the campers can provide him with a show-business connection after their parents see their performance. A 10-year-old Julie Klausner is one of the rehearsing campers.
- Stanley has fun with an oversized boogie board.
- Chris interviews Kevin about the camp play, and Kevin's ego has grown so big at this point that he renames himself Kevin Eisenstein.

=== Hour 6—campfire and talent show ===
- Victoria sings “The Boyfriend Song.”
- Ed and Dré start to perform Public Enemy’s “Don't Believe the Hype,” complete with call-and-response, but finish with the much more benign theme from Gilligan’s Island.
- Ken and Colin discuss roasting marshmallows with disastrous and harmful results.
- Randee tries to get everyone to sing a corny song, but when Dré begins to beat box and Al joins in with his accordion, everyone joins in the merriment.
- Alicia sings some campfire songs a little too nonchalantly, so Steve Treccase, accompanying her on a Roland keyboard, breaks into a song about dead bodies that ruins the vibe completely.
- Everyone sings Three Dog Night’s “Joy to the World,” accompanied by human beat box and keyboards. Al says good bye.

== Credits ==
- Director: David DeGiovanni
- Producer: David DeGiovanni
- Executive Producers: Joel Gallen, Doug Herzog (uncredited)
- Writers: Bat Mondavi, Peter Gaffney, David DeGiovanni, Peter Elwell, Keith Kaczorek
- Associate Producers: Norman Champion, Lisa Erlich Rapkin
- Production Manager: Susette Hsuing
- Production Coordinators: Beth Greenbaum, Marilyn J. Papa, Jackie Olensky (uncredited)
- Editor: Andy Kadison
- Technical Manager: George Epley
- Technical Coordinator: Harvey Gold
- Lighting Director: Bill Berner
- Camera: Paul Koestner, Richard Smith
- Video Engineer: Roger Miller
- Chyron: JT Tavares
- Gaffer: John Berry
- Electricians: Andy Hiliger, Gerard Macavoy
- Talent Assistants: Gerri Bulion, Stephanie Kahn
- Props: Jaime Bishop, Dan Fischer
- Make-up: Maria Matteos
- Director of On-Air Services: Rachel Gruhin
- Manager of Operations: Hank Kiechlin
- Director of Talent: Drue Wilson
- Production Associate: Stacey Wolf
- Production Assistants: Wyatt Baker, Jacqueline Barba, Mike Daole, Mike Flanagan, Jack Madrid, Dan Michaels, Bill Miller, Amy Rachlin, Jonathen Swain, Holly Tooker, Eric Whepley, Tony Wilesko, Doug Wilson
- Production Support: Lydia Cannito, Barbara Milberg
- Interns: Raquel Alvardo, William Costell, Jillian Harris, Scott Mitchell
- Concept: Vinnie Longobardo
- Special Thanks: John Hickey, Gwenn Howard, the Fleischner family, Camp Scatico
