= WBAU =

Garden City, New York; United States
- Frequency: 90.3 MHz

Programming
- Format: Defunct

Ownership
- Owner: Adelphi University

History
- First air date: July 1972; 53 years ago
- Last air date: August 1995; 30 years ago

Technical information
- Licensing authority: FCC
- Facility ID: 461
- Class: A
- ERP: 1,100 watts
- HAAT: 48 meters (157 ft)

Links
- Public license information: Public file; LMS

WBAU (90.3 FM) was the call sign of the student-operated radio station located at Adelphi University in Garden City, New York, 18 miles (29 km) east of Midtown Manhattan.

== History ==
WBAU was located at 90.3 on the FM dial, which it shared with WHPC, owned by Nassau Community College. Under the original agreement, WHPC owned the frequency from 9:00 am until 5:00 pm, and WBAU owned it from 5:00 pm until 1:00 am. From 1:00 am until 9:00 am, the two stations switched ownership of the frequency on an "odd–even day" basis, although neither station generally operated between 1:00 and 9:00 am until 1982, when the agreement was amended to allow WBAU to operate daily between 6:30 and 9:00 am. WBAU did take advantage of its time during its annual "Radiothon" fundraiser.

WBAU was originally called WALI, and broadcast entirely through carrier current at 640 on the AM dial. When, in 1971, the school decided to expand broadcast to the FM band, a protest by nearby WHLI (based on the call letters sounding so similar) led to the change to WBAU. Under these new call letters, the station began FM broadcasting in July 1972.

== Notable alumni and former radio staff ==
- Andre "Doctor Dré" Brown, (former Yo! MTV Raps host), T-Money (also a former Yo! MTV Raps host), Rapper G., Easy G Rockwell, and Wildman Steve of Original Concept
- William "Flavor Flav" Drayton Jr. of Public Enemy
- Gary Dell'Abate
- Carlton "Chuck D" Ridenhour, Hank "Shocklee" Boxley, and Keith "Shocklee" Boxley of Public Enemy
- Adario Strange
- Al Trautwig
- Jonathan M. Wolfert, founder & president of JAM Creative Productions

== See also ==
- WHPC — radio station at 90.3 FM that used to share time with WBAU
