= Marietta Piekenbrock =

German art curator (born 1964)

Marietta Piekenbrock (born 1964 in Westfalen) is a German art curator, dramaturge, author and a cultural manager. Her projects combine theatre, dance, performances and music with cultural history, architecture and everyday life. As an artistic manager of the Cultural Capital of Europe RUHR.2010 and Istanbul.2010, and for the Ruhrtriennale 2012-14, she invited international artists and curators to collaborate with the local cultural participants and players on developing new artistic projects in areas of radical social change. Her programmes of events and initiatives made a strong case for sustainable cultural practice. Her 2012 series of events "No Education" promoted a new discourse on the relationship between art, children and education.

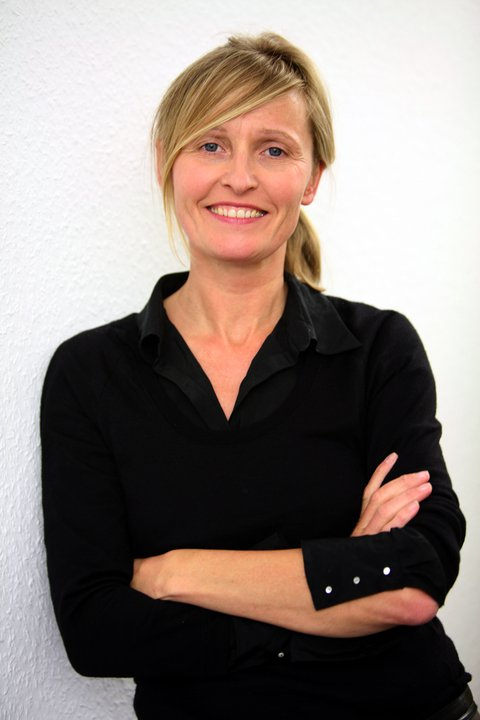
Marietta Piekenbrock

== Life ==
Piekenbrock studied Theatre, Philosophy and Art history in Aix-en-Provence, Munich and Paris with Julia Kristeva where she first worked as an author, curator and translator. In subsequent years she collaborated closely working theatres, museums, galleries, archives and publishers generating exhibitions, installations and artist's book. From 2000 she was active as an independent journalist for various newspapers and periodicals, from 2003–2003 as drama critic for the daily 'Frankfurter Allgemeine Zeitung'. 2004–2007 she worked for the RuhrTriennale as a dramaturg under general director Jürgen Flimm. 2007 she joined the administration of the European Capital of Culture RUHR.2010 as a head of music, theatre, dance and performance programming. The composer and intendant Heiner Goebbels invited her to become leading dramaturg for the Ruhrtriennale 2012-2014. Marietta Piekenbrock lives in Essen, and is mother to three children.

== European Capital of Culture Ruhr.2010/ European Capital of Culture Istanbul.2010 ==
She worked intensively with many important artists such as Hans Werner Henze, who wrote his last opera, Gisela! For the RUHR.2010 (an opera for and about youth, premiered at the RuhrTriennale)., the Pottfiction festival, the Odyssee Europa project which involved six theaters of the Ruhrgebiet area performing modern versions of Homer's Odyssey in two days. and artist groups like Rimini Protokoll and raumlaborberlin.

== Ruhrtriennale ==
Patti Smith, Michel Houellebecq, Harun Farocki, Tarek Atoui, Jérôme Bel, Boris Charmatz, Tino Sehgal, Laurent Chétouane, Nature Theater of Oklahoma, Mammalian Diving Reflex, Rimini Protokoll, Köbberling & Kaltwasser, Mischa Kuball and Dan Perjovschi are some of the international artists and artist groups Piekenbrock invited to the Ruhr area, in whose artistic work Piekenbrock sees "The deeply poignant reflection of change, that society and individuals experience in modern times".

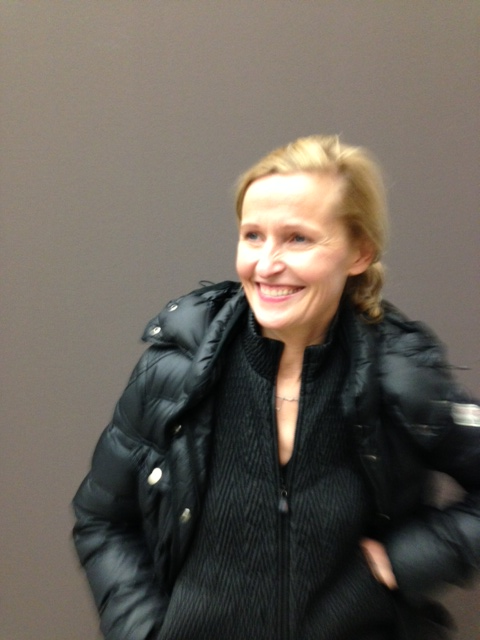
Marietta Piekenbrock

== Jury Memberships ==
Piekenbrock is a member of various specialist juries, including

- the Literature Prize of the City Munich
- Favoriten 2008/2010, Festival of free Theater German Federal State of North Rhine-Westphalia (NRW)
- George Tabori Prize 2010, awarded by the German Arts Fund, Berlin
- Mauricio Kagel Music Prize 2011, 2013 of the NRW Arts Fund, Düsseldorf 2011/ 2013)∆unststiftung NRW
- as of 2010 committee member of the German Performing Arts Fund, Berlin

== Projects ==
- Therese Giehse 1898–1998, Exhibition, Munich 1998, Deutsches Theatermuseum
- Christine Dössel, Marietta Piekenbrock: Theaterlexikon. ed. by C. Bernd Sucher, Deutscher Taschenbuch Verlag, Munich 1999
- Theaterjahr 1999, ed. by Deutsches Theatermuseum München und Berliner Festspiele GmbH, Prestel Verlag, Munich 1999.
- I am the last of the Mohicans, Joachim Kaiser - (1928−2017) Exhibition and Program, Munich, 2003, Literaturhaus München
- james nachtwey kriegsfotograf, Photography 1990–2003, exhibition and book notes, Literaturhaus München, Bibliothèque nationale Paris, 2003
- Poetic handwriting, A Exhibition and catalogue, Munich, 2004, Monacensia München, Blumenbar Verlag
- Ruhrtriennale 2004–07, Dramaturgical work, Texts and project development
- dokument : monument : raum exhibition and book, Salzburg, off mozart festival, Universität Salzburg, 2006
- European culture capital, RUHR.2010, Programme director, Musik, Theater, Dance, Performance 2007–11
- Ruhrtriennale 2012–14, Leading Dramaturg, Gelsenkirchen, Kulturruhr Gelsenkirchen
- Lecturer, department of cultural Studies, Witten/Herdecke University

== Publications (selection) ==
- C’est l’usine ou devenir léger, A propos du théâtre de Bernard Marie Koltès. In: Alternatives théâtrales no 35–36, Bruxelles 1990
- Anonym, Fotgrafien, Serge Bramly, Kehayoff, München, 1996, Aus der Französichen von Marietta Piekenbrock, ISBN 978-3929078305
- Europäisch kooperieren: garajistanbul. In: Dramaturgie. Zeitschrift der Dramaturgischen Gesellschaft 02/09, no2, 2009.
- Man wird danach anders denken. Conversation with Steven Sloane and Marietta Piekenbrock. Von Guido Hiß und Sebastian Kirsch. In: Schauplatz Ruhr 2009: Jahrbuch zum Theater im Ruhrgebiet, Bochum and Berlin 2009.
- Odyssee Europa. Sechs Schauspiele und eine Irrfahrt durch die Zwischenwelt. Vorwort. In: Theater, Theater. Aktuelle Stücke 20/10 Odyssee Europa. ed. by RUHR.2010, Uwe B. Carstensen und Stefanie von Lieven. Frankfurt a.M. 2010
- Die Geige sackt zu Boden. „3Abschied“ – Anne Teresa De Keersmaeker tanzt Jérôme Bel und das Sterben." In: Frankfurter Rundschau, 24. February 2010
- Zwei junge Fische schwimmen vor sich hin. In: 2. Biennale Tanzausbildung/tanzplan deutschland. Modelle der Rekonstruktion. Hrsg. von Folkwang Hochschule Essen, tanzplan Deutschland, Federal Ministry of Education and Research, and RUHR.2010. Essen 2010.
- Neue Räume, neue Wege. Über pottfiction. Theater, Kunst und Camps für Jugendliche der Metropole Ruhr. Ein Gespräch. In: pottfiction. Die Dokumentation. Essen 2010
- „Ich“ sagen müssen wollen. Über Michael Laub. In: Formen künstlerischer Zusammenarbeit. Sophiensaele 2007–2010. ed by Heike Albrecht und Matthias Dell. Berlin 2010. repr. in: Michael Laub: Burgporträts. programme booklet, Burgtheaters Vienna, March 2011.
- Permanent temporär. Für eine nachhaltige Kulturpraxis. In: RUHR.2010 – Wandel durch Kultur. Das Versprechen wurde eingelöst. In: politik & kultur. Zeitung des deutschen Kulturrats, no. 1, January - February 2011
- Stadt der Künste: Permanent Temporär. In: RUHR.2010. Die unmögliche Kulturhauptstadt. Chronik einer Metropole im Werden. ed. by von RUHR.2010, Essen 2011
- Ikonen des Selbstseins. Über Jitka Hanzlová Fünfzehn Portraits/ Fifteen Portraits. In: Das Henze-Projekt. Neue Musik für eine Metropole. Dokumentation. ed. by der RUHR.2010. Essen 2011
- No education! Marietta Piekenbrock im Gespräch mit Melanie Suchy, tanz: Zeitschrift für Ballett, Tanz und Performance, October 2011.
- Georges Pompidou oder Warum es nicht immer wichtig ist, zu wissen wo das Nature Theater of Oklahoma liegt, in No Education, programme booklet, Ruhrtriennale, 2012.
- Vers Mathilde: Im Gespräch mit Mathilde Monnier, in Soapéra/Twin Paradox, programme booklet, Ruhrtriennale, 2012.
- Die Ausserordentlichen: Über Jérôme Bel, "Disabled Theater", programme booklet, Ruhrtriennale, 2012.
- Der Ort ist Handlung: Im Gespräch mit dem Medienkünstler Mischa Kuball, programme booklet, Ruhrtriennale, 2013.
- Made in Belgium: Jan Lauwers, "deconstruction 07", in Das SPIELART Festival, Berlin: Spielmotor, Munich, and Theater der Zeit, 2013.
