= Bettina Rheims =

French photographer (born 1952)

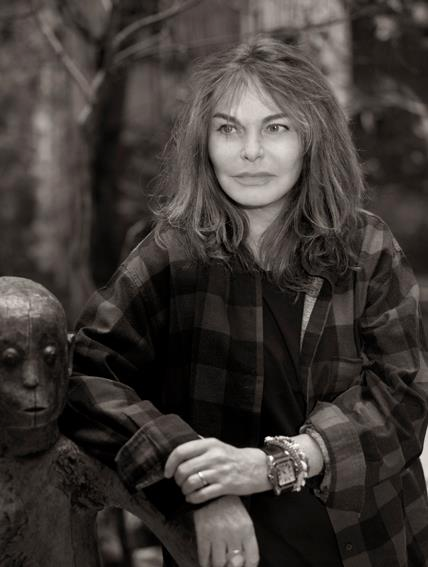
Rheims in 2004

Bettina Caroline Germaine Rheims (French pronunciation: [bɛtina kaʁɔlin ʒɛʁmɛn ʁɛ̃s]; born 18 December 1952) is a French photographer.

== Career ==
=== Early stages ===
Bettina Rheims was born in Neuilly-sur-Seine. Her photographic career began in 1978, when she took a series of photos of a group of strip-tease artists and acrobats, which would lead to her first exhibitions. This work would unveil Bettina Rheims' favourite subject, the female model, to which she would frequently return during her career. The 1980s provided Bettina Rheims with the opportunity to take several portraits of both famous and unknown women, resulting in the publication of Female Trouble (1989).

In 1982, the Animal series enabled Rheims' to train her lens on another form of nudity: that of stuffed animals with fixed stares, "which seemed to want to express something beyond death". "I had to capture their gaze" declared the photographer.

With Modern Lovers (1989-1990) [note] the photographer questioned gender, androgyny and transsexuality. Two other publications on the same subject followed: Les Espionnes (1992) and Kim (1994).

=== The 1990s ===
At the beginning of the 1990s, Bettina Rheims worked on one of her major series, entitled Chambre Close (1990-1992). This was her first in colour and marked the start of her collaboration with the novelist Serge Bramly, in a work which saw her photographs coupled with the writer's fiction. In its form, Chambre Close is a parody of the first pornographic photos — rooms with faded walls, old fashioned wallpaper — yet, in its substance, it endeavours to stage amateur models in poses playing on the eroticism and the confusion between those who are looking and those who are showing themselves.

"By using colour and extreme quality printings, the flesh appears living and gives a disconcerting realism to the work. Bettina Rheims thus transcends the body to reach primitive femininity in her psychoanalytical "id" - her more or less pent-up impulses, sexual impulses in particular. At the same time as these impulses show through the surface, the awareness of the model, through her skin, the artist captures them on film."

In 1995, Rheims was invited by Jacques Chirac at the end of his presidential campaign to work behind the scenes on a series of photographs following the final stages of the election. After the election, the Presidency of the French Republic commissioned Bettina Rheims to take the official portrait of Jacques Chirac. She told the newspaper Libération that she had wanted to give the President "the relaxed look of the great heroes in westerns".

She was featured in Maya Gallus's 1997 documentary film Erotica: A Journey Into Female Sexuality.

The decade drew to a close with the 1999 publication of the book I.N.R.I. and its eponymous exhibition. Once again uniting the gaze of Rheims with the prose of Serge Bramly, I.N.R.I. builds a philosophical dialogue on the history of the crucifixion through photographs of scenes of the life of Christ, from the Annunciation to the Ascension. Bettina Rheims proposed "illustrations in step with our times, after the appearance of photography, cinema and advertising imagery, as if Jesus were returning today." [note]. In France, the publication of this work was highly controversial.

=== The 2000s ===
In 2002, Rheims created a series on Shanghai during two long stays in the city. "The first impressions of a traveller arriving in Shanghai are those of people with deep-rooted ancestral rituals and traditions who threw themselves into the frenetic race of the present-day world. Blending into this 'other way of thought' and without any prejudices, Bettina Rheims offers us a novel view of this paradox, which is the coexistence of China with its millenary traditions, its avant-garde facet, its official aspects and its underground features."

In 2005, at the Galerie De Noirmont, Rheims exhibited Héroïnes, a work that was primarily a homage to sculpture. On this occasion, the photographer collaborated with the designer Jean Colonna [note interne W] to dress the women in original clothing. "Old haute couture dresses were thus re-assembled on each of these contemporary icons. These women, with their unconventional beauty, then played with a stone, which for a moment became their pedestal."

At the end of the 2000s, Bettina Rheims worked with Serge Bramly again and exhibited Rose, c'est Paris in 2010 at the National Library of France. The photographic tale was again built on a thread of fiction that Bettina Rheims and Serge Bramly created from autobiographical elements. In this work, Paris plays "the role of the muse more than the subject, and [appears], through the characters woven into a story, in an almost allegorical form. A young woman we know by her initial, B., is looking for Rose, her twin sister who she claims has disappeared. Presented as a 'great mysterious series', a genre held dear by surrealists, Rose, c'est Paris is divided into thirteen episodes in which we discover among other things an unusual or obscure Paris, which is voluntarily timeless."

=== The 2010s ===
Exhibited in 2012 in Düsseldorf, the Gender Studies series pursues the questioning of gender representation. The device linking image and sound (by Frédéric Sanchez) presents 27 sound portraits of young men and women who responded to a request the photographer posted on Facebook. The photos are accompanied by interview clips and have featured in several exhibitions and a book.

=== Commissioned work ===
Rheims has also worked on advertising campaigns for fashion and big brands, such as Chanel and Lancôme, as well as taking portraits of famous women for international magazines. Rheims says that she has been inspired by Diane Arbus and Helmut Newton as well as by the work of early painters.

== Publications ==
- Modern Lovers, Éditions Paris Audiovisuel, 1990.
- Female Trouble, Schirmer / Mosel Verlag, 1991.
- Chambre Close (text by Serge Bramly), Gina Kehayoff Verlag, Munich, 1992.
- Les Espionnes (text by Bernard Lamarche-Vadel), Kehayoff Verlag, Munich, 1992.
- Kim, Kehayoff Verlag, Munich, 1994.
- Animal, Kehayoff Verlag, Munich, 1994.
- I.N.R.I. Jésus, 2000 ans après ... (text by Serge Bramly), Éditions Albin Michel, Paris, November 1998.
- X'mas, Éditions Léo Scheer, Paris, October 2000.
- A Room in the Museum of Modern Art in Frankfurt, Kehayoff Verlag, Munich, 2000.
- Morceaux Choisis, Steidl Verlag, Göttingen, 2002.
- Shanghai (text by Serge Bramly), Éditions Robert Laffont, Paris, October 2003.
- Rétrospective, Schirmer/Mosel Verlag, Munich, 2004.
- More Trouble, Schirmer / Mosel Verlag, Munich, 2004.
- Oxymoriques. Les Photographies de Bettina Rheims, Michel Onfray, Éditions Jannink, Paris, 2005.
- Héroïnes, Galerie Jérôme de Noirmont, Paris, 2006.
- The Book Of Olga (text by Catherine Millet), Taschen, Cologne, 2008.
- Rose, c'est Paris (text by Serge Bramly), Taschen, 2010.
- Mylène Farmer, TIMELESS 2013 concert programme, Paris, 2013.

== Family ==
Bettina Rheims is the daughter of Maurice Rheims, an art auctioneer and historian, novelist, member of the Académie française and administrator of Pablo Picasso's estate, and the sister of writer and producer Nathalie Rheims. She was Serge Bramly's partner and is today married to the lawyer Jean-Michel Darrois. She is also related to the Rothschild family, through her great-grandfather (the branch called the "von Worms").

== Awards and decorations ==
- 1994: Grand Prix de la Photographie, Paris
- 14 July 2013: Commander of the French Legion of Honour (Officer, 2006)
- 2018: Grand officier de l'ordre du Mérite.
