= Sophie Bramly =

French TV producer and director

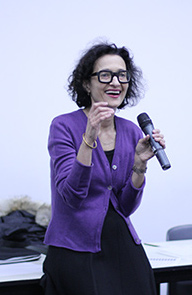
- Bramly in 2015
- Born: 1959 (age 66–67); Tunisia
- Occupations: Photographer; TV producer; writer
- Relatives: Serge Bramly (brother); Elsa Cayat (cousin)
- Awards: Chevalier des Arts et des Lettres; 2017

Sophie Bramly (born 1959) is a French photographer, television producer/director, digital pioneer, and author. She’s best known for the hip-hop photos she shot in New York in the early Eighties, the creation of hip-hop television show Yo! MTV Raps she produced and hosted for MTV Europe in the late 80s and early 90s, and the website and online community dedicated to female pleasure she established in Paris in 2008. This career has been described as “protean” in Le Figaro. In 2017 France's Ministry of Culture named Bramly a Chevalier de l'Ordre des Arts et des Lettres.

== Early life ==
Sophie Bramly was born to Jewish parents in Tunisia in June 1959, and moved with her family to Paris at the age of two. She is the sister of the writer Serge Bramly and the first cousin of Elsa Cayat, a columnist who was assassinated during the Charlie Hebdo shooting. In high-school, Bramly toyed with the idea of becoming a lawyer, but ultimately studied graphic arts at Penninghen, the Paris art school. Upon graduation, Bramly began freelancing as a photographer and, shortly after, her work began to appear in publications including Paris Match, Elle (magazine), Le Jardin des Modes, and Metal Hurlant. She was 21 years old when some of her images were exhibited in a show called Autoportraits Photographiques 1898-1981 at the Centre Pompidou, alongside photos by Man Ray, Duane Michals, Cindy Sherman, René Magritte, Edward Steichen, Cecil Beaton, William Wegman, Robert Mapplethorpe, and others.

== Career ==
=== Hip-Hop Photography in New York ===
Bramly was 22 when she was introduced to hip-hop on a visit to New York in 1981. “I was flabbergasted when I first saw the New York City Breakers at a party downtown,” she’s said. “Then a friend introduced me to some rappers, and after that I felt like Joan of Arc on a mission. I dropped everything else I was doing and I followed them everywhere they went for four years.”

Unlike some of her contemporaries, who focused on one or another of hip-hop’s sub-genres, Bramly documented pioneers from all four of hip-hop’s elements: emcees (including Grandmaster Melle Mel, Kurtis Blow, Lisa Lee, the Fat Boys, Run-DMC, and the Beastie Boys), deejays (including Kool Herc, Afrika Bambaataa, Afrika Islam, Jazzy Jay, Grandmaster Flash, and Kool DJ Red Alert), graffiti artists (including DONDI, Futura, Zephyr, Lady Pink, and Fab 5 Freddy), and breakdancers (including members of Magnificent Force, Dynamic Breakers, and the Rock Steady Crew). She also captured behind-the-scenes players, including the record producers Bill Laswell, and Rick Rubin; the Fun Gallery’s Patti Astor; and notable establishment figures who collaborated with the hip-hoppers, including Herbie Hancock and Harry Belafonte.

It took nearly 30 years for Bramly’s New York photos to begin gaining renown. In 2011, the Red Bull Music Academy published a limited-edition book of her photos entitled “1981+,” which generated three separate solo shows of her work at galleries in France. In 2015, Paris’ Galerie 213 published a limited-edition book of her photos entitled “Walk This Way,” which resulted in four solo shows of her work. In 2018, in the wake of a group show entitled “Gold,” the Mucem Museum in Marseille acquired twelve of Bramly’s photos. That same year three of her photos, along with the contact sheets from which they were chosen, were published in Vikki Tobak’s book, “Contact High.” In January 2022, England's Soul Jazz Books published "Yo! The Early Days of Hip Hop 1982-84," a comprehensive collection of Bramly's early work. "The book features many stunning, intimate images of a star-studded roll call of legendary hip hop figures, all of whom were only just getting known or in their ascendency," according to a review on artbook.com.

=== Hip-Hop Television in Paris ===
Back in France in 1984, Bramly began working on the first ever television show devoted to hip-hop. Called “H.i.p.H.o.p” and hosted by Sidney Duteil, a Frenchman of Guadeloupian heritage, it aired weekly on the TF1 network. As the show’s artistic director, Bramly created its logo. She also worked as a photographer, co-author and artistic advisor alongside Duteil on “Hip Hop Story,” an early French-language book devoted to the culture, published by Hachette Jeunesse in 1984.

=== Hip-Hop Television in London ===
Bramly moved to London in 1987, to start work at MTV Europe. She went on to produce and host "Yo!" — the first English-language hip-hop TV show to be broadcast in Europe. A showcase not only for American rap (and, occasionally, for the soul and funk that preceded it), but for the rap then being made in England, Holland, Spain, and France, “Yo!” ran weekly from October 1987 through to the December 1990, with some 145 episodes. Inspired by Bramly's show, MTV US began producing Yo! MTV Raps less than a year later, hosted by Fab 5 Freddy.

=== French music industry, films and books about female sexuality ===
In 1991 Bramly returned to France and began working for PolyGram, helping to usher the music label into the digital age. After Polygram was merged with the Universal Music Group in 1999, Bramly founded and was named director of the firm’s New Media Department, which she ran until 2007.

After leaving Universal, Bramly established SoFilles, a production company focused on “la culture du plaisir feminin” (women’s sexuality), and a website called SecondSexe. “The day I realized that half of the Internet was porn but none of it – or almost none of it – was for women, made me really angry,” she said in 2014. “How come, 50 or 60 years after women’s liberation, women look like all they still care about was love and making babies, but not having sex?”. In 2008, Bramly produced X Femmes, a series for French television of ten short erotic films directed by female directors including Zoe Cassavetes, Mélanie Laurent, Arielle Dombasle, Lola Doillon, Laetitia Masson, Helena Noguerra and Caroline Loeb. The films were praised on doctissimo.fr as “capable of awakening a woman’s desire without falling into low-end pornography.” Bramly has continued to produce and direct documentaries for French television, all focusing on her three favorite subjects: hip-hop, female empowerment, and pro-sex feminism.

Bramly has also authored or edited three books, including Un matin, j’etais feministe (2019) which was described in ‘’Le Figaro’’ as “passionate, personal, and scholarly.”
