= Moon Boots =

American DJ and music producer (born 1984)

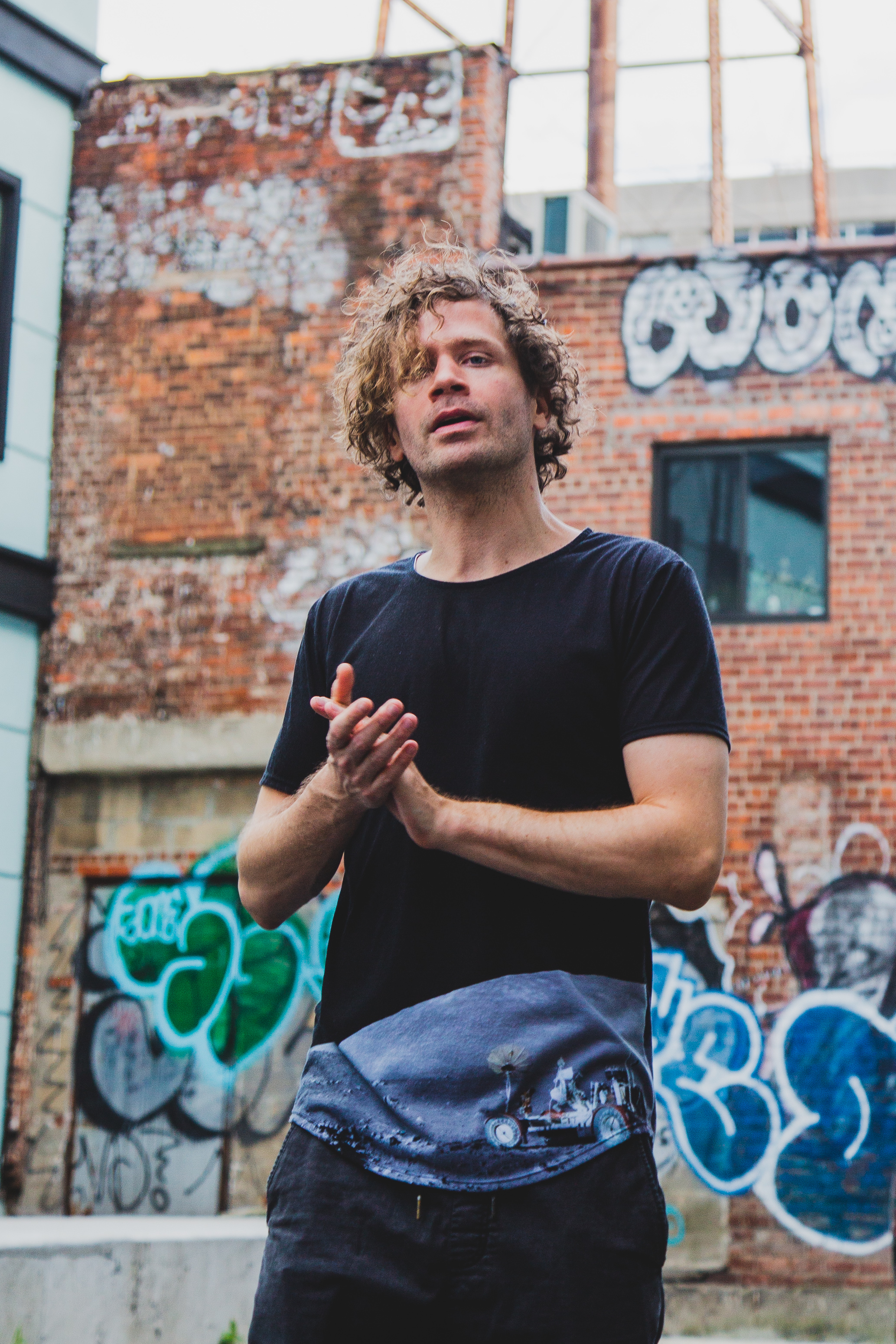
- Dougherty in 2019

Background information
- Born: Peter Dougherty; June 27, 1984 (age 42); Brooklyn, New York, US
- Genres: House
- Occupations: Music producer, DJ
- Website: www.moonbootsmusic.com

Peter Dougherty (born June 27, 1984), who goes by the stage name Moon Boots, is an American DJ and music producer from Brooklyn, New York.

== Early life and education ==
Dougherty was born in Prospect Heights, Brooklyn and grew up in the suburbs of Connecticut. He started to play the piano as a child. In high school he experimented with keyboards and synthesizers. A jazz piano teacher lent him a Yamaha DXZ when he was a freshman; he said it "blew his mind."

He attended Princeton University where he planned to study electrical engineering. He changed his major after he realized that his interest in engineering was limited. He investigated several majors, including art history, economics and religion, before he decided to major in music. At Princeton, much of the music program was academic; it focused on classical composition, musicology, and music history although it also included jazz and world music.

== Career ==
After finishing his education, he moved to Chicago to pursue a music career. To get his music heard, Dougherty would distribute demos to local DJs and would also spread his music online to share and evolve his sound. During his time in Chicago, Dougherty would join fellow musicians Saam Hagshenas and Jonathan Marks and become the keyboardist of the indie band Hey Champ. The band was noticed by American rapper and producer Lupe Fiasco, who signed the band to his 1st & 15th record label in 2008. Later, Dougherty left the band and returned to DJing again. In 2011, Dougherty met Perseus (Leon Oziel), the founder of the record label / DJ collective French Express. He joined the label and made his first release, "Off My Mind / Gopherit" for French Express later that year. After he moved back to Brooklyn, Dougherty was introduced to London-based label Anjunadeep where he was later signed.

His debut album, First Landing, was released on August 4, 2017, on Anjunadeep. The album received favourable reviews and was extensively played on KCRW in Los Angeles where Dougherty also performed tracks from the album live on KCRW's Morning Becomes Eclectic hosted by Jason Bentley Additionally, the album charted at #1 on NACC Electronic Album in August and September 2017. “First Landing” was also chosen as Tower Records Japan's “Record Of The Month”.

In 2018, following the release of First Landing, Dougherty began performing with a live band. The live band consists of Peter Dougherty (keyboard, synthesizer, backing vocals/vocoder), Ross Clark (guitar, bass, synth bass), Dusty Kaufman (drums), Black Gatsby, Nic Hanson, Elie Fletcher and KONA (all vocals). In this new live configuration, Moon Boots sold-out shows at El Rey Theatre (Los Angeles), The Independent (San Francisco), Music Hall Of Williamsburg (Brooklyn) and made further appearances at Red Rocks Amphitheater (Morrison, CO) and Mamby On The Beach (Chicago).

The same year, DJ Mag elected Dougherty as their “Breakthrough Producer” in their BONA2018 (Best Of North America) awards. He also became a Mixmag x AKG: HEADSPACE featured artist, where he was featured in a mini web documentary and interviewed in an episode of Mixmag's On Rotation, where he disclosed topics such as his musical influences and being a live musician. He continued to DJ and has performed at a multitude of festivals across North America including Movement, EDC Las Vegas, Coachella, Ultra Music Festival, Electric Zoo, Paradiso, CRSSD and Spring Awakening.

In 2019, Moon Boots released a 2-song EP which included tracks "Keramas" and "Harpanet." This was followed by 2nd album singles "Tied up" ft. Steven Klavier, "Juanita" ft. Kaleena Zanders and "Clear" ft. Nic Hanson. All singles were well-received and got playtime on SiriusXM, KCRW, BBC Radio 1, and Triple J, and received support from DJ's such as The Black Madonna, Diplo, Claptone, MistaJam, Above & Beyond, and Danny Howard. "Tied Up" and "Clear" also had music videos released, directed by Nicholas Keays and Jordan Rosenheck respectively.

On September 6, 2019, the album, Bimini Road, was released. It was ranked by KCRW as eighth on its Best Albums of 2019. The album saw some familiar collaborators return, including Nic Hanson, KONA and Black Gatsby. It also featured new collaborators Niia, Little Boots, Kaleena Zanders, Steven Klavier, and Gary Saxby of the Harlem Gospel Choir.

The release of Bimini Road was followed by a headlining tour across North America and London. The tour featured a seven-piece band, consisting of vocalists KONA, Nic Hanson, Eleanor Fletcher, Black Gatsby, Dougherty on keys, synths, and backing vocals, and Ross Clark and Dustin Kaufman (of indie dance band St. Lucia) on guitar/bass, and drums. The live show is a CPU-light, almost entirely analog set-up using a variety of synths, instruments and pads to trigger samples. It also includes new versions of songs specifically made for the live experience that differ from the original studio recordings. To coincide with the end of the tour, Dougherty released album track "Whisper In The Wind" ft. Black Gatsby as a single, along with a remix from Grammy-winning artist, Alex Metric, and a music video directed by Nate Camponi.

In 2020, remixes of Moon Boots' track "Tied Up" were released, including mixes from Kenny Dope and Mat Zo. Remixes of "Clear," by Wookie and Garrett David were released March 24. On May 13, remixes of "Juanita" by Mark Broom and Bawrut were released. On June 19, Moon Boots releases the EP Pure Moons Vol.1, and launched his label imprint Pure Moons. On July 29, Moon Boots released Bimini Road Remixed, featuring remixes of all of the songs from his sophomore album from the likes of DJ Holographic, Oceans1985 (Tyler from Classixx), Dark Arts Club, DJ Clea, Crackazat, Soela, Tinlicker, and more.

On March 17, 2023, the third album Ride Away, was released. The album saw some familiar collaborators return, including Nic Hanson, Black Gatsby, and Steven Klavier. It also featured new collaborators Cherry Glazerr, Dope Earth Alien, Praa, and Ora the Molecule.

== Discography ==
=== Studio albums ===
- First Landing (2017) - Anjunadeep
- First Landing Remixed (2018) - Anjunadeep
- Bimini Road (2019) - Anjunadeep
- Bimini Road Remixed (2020) - Anjunadeep
- Ride Away (2023) - Anjunadeep

=== Singles and EPs ===
- Pure Moons Vol. 1 (2020) - Pure Moons
- W.T.F. (2020) - Anjunadeep
- Juanita (The Remixes) ft. Kaleena Zanders (2020) - Anjunadeep
- Clear (The Remixes) ft. Nic Hanson (2020) - Anjunadeep
- Tied Up (The Remixes) ft. Steven Klavier (2020) - Anjunadeep
- Whisper In The Wind ft. Black Gatsby (2019) - Anjunadeep
- Clear ft. Nic Hanson (2019) - Anjunadeep
- Juanita ft. Kaleena Zanders (2019) - Anjunadeep
- Tied Up ft. Steven Klavier (2019) - Anjunadeep
- Keramas / Harpanet - Anjunadeep (2019) - Anjunadeep
- Keep The Faith ft. Nic Hanson (Lifelike Remix) - 2018 - Anjunadeep
- Utopia ft. Janelle Kroll (Nick Monaco Remix) - 2018 - Anjunadeep
- First Landing (Live Sessions) - 2018 - Anjunadeep
- Power ft. Black Gatsby - 2018 - Anjunadeep
- I Want Your Attention ft. Fiora - 2017 - Anjunadeep
- KeepThe Faith ft. Nic Hanson - 2017 - Anjunadeep
- The Life Aquatic (The Remixes) - 2017 - Anjunadeep
- The Life Aquatic - 2017 - Anjunadeep
- Tear My Heart ft. Lulu James (The Remixes) - 2017 - Anjunadeep
- Tear My Heart ft. Lulu James - 2017 - Anjunadeep
- Red Sky (The Remixes) - 2016 - Anjunadeep
- Red Sky - 2016 - Anjunadeep
- Utopia ft. Janelle Kroll - Moon Boots Music - 2015
- Magic - Moon Boots Music - 2015
- There's No Love - Moon Boots Music - 2015
- Don't Ask Why ft. Kyiki - Cr2 Records - 2014
- Whatever You Need - French Express - 2014
- C.Y.S. - French Express - 2014
- Lovestrong - French Express - 2013
- No One - French Express - 2013
- Aretha - Nurvous - 2013
- Sugar - French Express - 2012
- Off My Mind / Gopher It - French Express - 2011

=== Remixes ===
- Dua Lipa - Break My Heart (Moon Boots Remix) - 2020 - Warner Music
- Local Natives - Tap Dancer (Moon Boots Remix) - 2020 - Loma Vista Recordings
- Tamia - Leave It Smokin' (Moon Boots Remix) - 2018 - Entertainment One
- Rhye - Taste (Moon Boots Remix) - 2018 - Loma Vista Recordings
- Sofi Tukker - Johny (Moon Boots Remix) - 2017 - Ultra Records
- Justin Jay ft. Josh Taylor & Benny Bridges - Climbing Trees (Moon Boots Remix) - 2017 - Repopulate Mars
- Elohim - Xanax (Moon Boots Remix) - 2016 - Elohim Music
- Lane 8 ft. Lulu James - Loving You (Moon Boots Remix) - 2016 - Anjunadeep
- Robyn & la Bagatelle Magique - Love Is Free (Moon Boots Remix) - 2015 - Konichiwa Records
- George Maple - Talk Talk (Moon Boots Remix) - 2015 - Future Classic
- CHVRCHES - The Mother We Share (Moon Boots Remix) - 2014 - Glassnote
- Nile Rodgers - Do What You Wanna Do (Moon Boots Remix) - 2014 - Cr2 Records
- Florrie - Little White Lies (Moon Boots Remix) - 2014 - Sony Music UK
- Bondax - Gold (Moon Boots Remix) - 2013 - Ultra Records
- Alison Valentine - Peanut Butter (Moon Boots Remix) - 2013 - Free Download
- Little Boots - Headphones (Moon Boots Remix) - 2012 - Free Download
- Zimmer - Horizontal Disco (Moon Boots Remix) - 2012 - Discotexas Germany
- Monsoon Season ft. Miss Bee - Green On Blue (Moon Boots Remix) - 2012 - Deep & Disco
