= Anjunadeep in Ibiza 2010 =

Anjunadeep In Ibiza 2010

Compilation album by Above & Beyond
- Released: 24 August 2010
- Genre: Progressive trance, progressive house, electro
- Label: Anjunadeep

Anjunadeep In Ibiza 2010 is a digital album compiled by British trance group Above & Beyond, released on 24 August 2010 on Anjunadeep, a label imprint owned by Above & Beyond.

== Track listing ==
Disc one
| No. | Title | Artist | Length |
|---|---|---|---|
| 1. | "Moth (Martin Roth Remix)" | Jaytech & James Grant | 8:23 |
| 2. | "The Promised Loop (Edit)" | 16 Bit Lolitas | 9:24 |
| 3. | "Part-Time Hero (Original Mix)" | Solarity | 8:40 |
| 4. | "Shoreline (Original Mix)" | Answer 42 | 7:04 |
| 5. | "Abandoned (Original Mix)" | Proff | 7:14 |
| 6. | "In Our Dreams (Original Mix)" | Dave Horne | 8:15 |
| 7. | "Fremou (Original Mix)" | Roddy Reynaert | 7:10 |
| 8. | "Alien & Butterfly (Solid Sky Remix)" | Sergey Tkachev | 6:19 |
| 9. | "Aircraft (Original Mix)" | Dinka | 7:49 |
| 10. | "Tucano (Original Mix)" | Answer 42 | 7:15 |
| 11. | "Hola (PROFF Remix)" | Monakhov & Que | 7:34 |
| 12. | "Albina (Original Mix)" | Proff | 7:51 |
| 13. | "Anjunadeep In Ibiza 2010 (Continuous DJ Mix)" | Jaytech | 1:15:04 |
