= Peter Dougherty =

American executive

Peter Dougherty (1955–2015) was the creator of the show Yo! MTV Raps, and played a formative role in shaping the early activity on MTV.

He was a 1977 graduate of Ithaca College.

He directed the music video for The Pogues song "The Fairy Tale of New York".
