= Ed Lover =

American entertainer (born 1963)

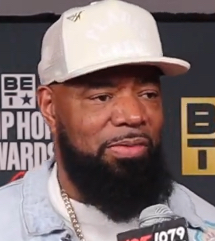
- Ed Lover in 2022

Background information
- Born: February 12, 1963 (age 63); Brooklyn, New York City, U.S.
- Origin: Queens, New York City, U.S.
- Genres: Hip hop
- Occupations: Disc jockey; radio personality; actor; rapper
- Years active: 1988–present
- Label: Relativity

Ed Lover (born James Roberts; February 12, 1963) is an American disc jockey, radio personality, actor, musician, and one of the first MTV VJ hosts of Yo! MTV Raps with Doctor Dré and Fab 5 Freddy.

Lover has been host of many influential radio and television music shows throughout his career beginning with Yo! MTV Raps, including the morning show at classic hip-hop "104.3 Jams" WBMX in Chicago until 2022, The Ed Lover Experience on classic hip-hop stations across the US including WBMX Chicago, "Q100.5" KXQQ Las Vegas, "102 Jams" KRBQ San Francisco and "Hot 103.7" KHTP Seattle, and C'Mon Son! The Podcast.

Lover is widely recognized as the first person to announce the death of Tupac Shakur at a Nas concert in 1996.

== "C'mon SON!" and Other Media ==
Lover is also well known for his catchphrase, "C'mon Son!", which he popularized as a humorous way to call out absurd or questionable behavior in pop culture. The phrase gained widespread recognition and became a staple of his Youtube-based commentary, leading to a recurring segment on his shows where he would rant about various topics, lifting a cardboard sign with the words "C'mon SON!" written on it while delivering the catchphrase.

On C'Mon Son! The Podcast Lover continues his signature style of commentary on hip-hop, entertainment, and current events.

Lover has also made several cameo appearances in television and film, including a recurring guest role on episodes of the USA Network series Psych, which adopted his catchphrase as one of the series' running jokes.

== Filmography ==
=== Film ===
Year	Title	Role	Notes
1992	Juice	Contest Judge	
1992	Move the Crowd	Himself	TV movie
1993	A Cool Like That Christmas	Himself (voice)	TV movie
1993	Who's the Man?	Himself	
1994	Gunmen	Himself	
1998	Ride	Six	
1999	Double Platinum	Party Ardie	TV movie
2002	Undisputed	Marvin Bonds	
2003	The Hustle	Red	Video
2004	The Bahama Hustle	Red	Video
2011	You're Nobody 'til Somebody Kills You	Himself	
2018	Come Sunday	Elector	
2022	Staring at Strangers	Himself	
2022	Respect the Jux	Himself	

=== Television ===
Year	Title	Role	Notes
1988-95	Yo! MTV Raps	Himself/Host	Main Host
1989	Camp MTV	Himself	Episode: "Hour 2"
1992	The Royal Family	Himself	Episode: "The Fame Game"
1992	Where in the World Is Carmen Sandiego?	Himself	Episode: "The Brazen Bean Bamboozlement"
1992	The Cosby Show	Taxi Driver	Episode: "Bring Me the Lip Gloss of Deirdre Arpelle"
1994	Ghostwriter	Himself	Episode: "Don't Stop the Music: Part 1-4"
1995	Source Hip-Hop Music Awards	Himself/Co-Host	Main Co-Host
1995	New York Undercover	Himself	Episode: "You Get No Respect"
1996	The Daily Show	Himself/Correspondent	Recurring Correspondent: Season 1
1998	One World Music Beat	Himself/Host	Main Host
1998-99	The Hughleys	Cousin Jimmy	Guest Cast: Season 1-2
1999	Moesha	Himself	Episode: "Isn't She Lovely?"
1999-01	Battle Dome	Himself/Announcer	Main Announcer
2000	The Jamie Foxx Show	Lucien	Episode: "Serve No Wine Before I Get Mine"
2001-02	According to Jim	Ed	Recurring Cast: Season 1
2003	Comedy Central Roast	Himself	Episode: "Comedy Central Roast of Denis Leary"
2003	Rock Me Baby	Himself	Episode: "A Pain in the Aspen"
2004	5 Deadly Videos	Himself/Host	Main Host
2005	I Want To Be a Hilton	Himself	Episode: "Episode #1.7"
2006	VH1 Goes Inside	Himself	Episode: "Yo! MTV Raps"
2006	Hip Hop Hold Em	Himself/Host	Main Host
2009	Life After	Himself	Episode: "Bell Biv DeVoe"
2010	Rude Tube	Himself	Episode: "Viral Ads"
2011-14	Psych	Himself/Bailiff Comonsat	Guest Cast: Season 6 & 8
2012	Big Morning Buzz Live	Himself/Panelist	Episode: "Episode #5.4"
2015	The '90s: We Invented This	Himself/Host	Main Host
2015	Gotham Comedy Live	Himself/Host	Episode: "Ed Lover"
2015-17	Fresh Off the Boat	Himself	Guest Cast: Season 2-3
2016	The Eighties	Himself	Episode: "Video Killed the Radio Star"
2016	Unsung	Himself	Episode: "Kwame"
2017	Dish Nation	Himself/Guest Co-Host	Episode: "Episode #5.131" & "#5.217"
2017	The Nineties	Himself	Episode: "Isn't it Ironic?"
2017	In the Cut	Roderick	Episode: "Matter of Principle"
2018	The 2000s	Himself	Episode: "The I Decade" & "I Want My MP3"
2019	South Side	Himself	Episode: "Chi-Town"
2022	Unsung	Himself	Episode: "Monie Love" & "P.M. Dawn"
2024	Kings from Queens: The Run DMC Story	Himself	Main Guest

=== Documentary ===
Year	Title
1989	Overcoming Self-Destruction
1990	Rapmania: The Roots of Rap
1991	Human Education Against Lies
2001	Street Life
2002	Slip N' Slide: All Star Weekend
2003	Death of a Dynasty
2004	War on Wax: Rivalries in Hip-Hop
2005	New Jack City: A Hip Hop Classic
2010	In Search of Ted Demme
2016	Spring Broke
2016	We're Still Here (Now).... A Documentary about nobody.

== Discography ==
Album information
Back Up Off Me!
- Released: November 8, 1994
- Chart positions: No. 91 Top R&B/Hip-Hop, No. 27 Top Heatseekers
- Last RIAA certification:
- Singles: "Back Up Off Me!", "For the Love of You"
