= Doctor Dré =

American radio personality and former MTV VJ

- Born: André Green; December 5, 1963 (age 62); Westbury, New York, U.S.
- Genres: Hip hop
- Occupations: Rapper; radio personality; actor; musician
- Years active: 1986–present
- Label: Relativity

André Brown (born December 5, 1963), better known as Doctor Dré, is an American rapper, radio personality and former MTV VJ.

== Early life ==
André Brown was born and raised in Westbury, New York, on Long Island.

== Career ==
In the early 1980s, Doctor Dré was a DJ at WBAU, the radio station of Adelphi University in Garden City, New York. With three other DJs at the station, he formed the "Concept Crew", which began to create its own music. In 1986, they renamed themselves Original Concept, a hip-hop group that ultimately released their sole album, 1988's Straight from the Basement of Kooley High!, on Def Jam Recordings.

In a 2018 interview, Doctor Dré described his early college work:

I was in a black-music history class with Chuck D., [future Def Jam president] Bill Stephney, and [journalist] Harry Allen at Adelphi University. Bill was hosting The Mr. Bill Show on [Adelphi student station] 90.3 FM WBAU, and they brought me up there. And that's where I met Flavor Flav, who at the time was 'MC DJ Flavor'. I started a show called The Operating Room, where I interviewed people like Run-DMC, and we used to make songs which we played as promos for the show. Jam Master Jay encouraged me to take what we were doing to Russell Simmons. I went to see Rick Rubin, down at NYU, and I played him this promo called "Knowledge Me", where we talked about all the shows [on WBAU].

From 1989 to 1995, Doctor Dré and Ed Lover were the co-hosts of MTV's hip hop music program Yo! MTV Raps.

Dré teamed up with Lover in the early 1990s to co-host a morning radio show during the re-launch of radio station Hot 97 (WQHT) in New York City.

The duo starred in the 1993 film Who's the Man?, directed by Yo! MTV Raps co-creator and co-director Ted Demme.

Dré and Ed Lover also recorded an album in 1994 titled Back up off Me! that was released on Relativity Records.

Dré also served as a DJ for the Beastie Boys.

Dré had his own urban clothing line called Bigga Stuff in the early 1990s, but it was never widely distributed.

Dré and Ed Lover participated in the 2003 Comedy Central Roast of their Who's the Man? co-star, comedian Denis Leary.

=== Guest appearances on TV ===
He guest-starred on The Fresh Prince of Bel-Air in the episode "Ill Will" as a figment of Will Smith's nightmare of bad doctors. He also appeared on an episode of The People's Court with Judge Marilyn Milian as a witness for a talent director suing former colleagues of his. They won US$1,500, the full amount requested for the gig deposit.

He appeared as a guest on MSNBC's The Beat with Ari Melber on June 1, 2018, along with Yo! MTV Raps co-host Ed Lover. During their segment they promoted the re-boot of the show.

== Personal life ==
Doctor Dré has type 2 diabetes. He lost his vision in October 2019 and his leg in 2020 due to complications from the disease. He is married to Brigide Brown. He has two children, son Arahmus and daughter Angelique.

== Discography ==
Album information
Back Up Off Me!
- Released: November 8, 1994
- Chart positions: #91 Top R&B/Hip-Hop, #27 Top Heatseekers
- Last RIAA certification: N/A
- Singles: "Back Up Off Me!" "For the Love of You"
