= Yo! MTV Raps =

American television music video program

- Also known as: Yo!
- Genre: Hip-hop music; Hip-hop culture
- Created by: Sophie Bramly (Europe); Ted Demme (American); Peter Dougherty (American)
- Directed by: Ted Demme; Moses Edinborough
- Presented by: Original series (Europe): Sophie Bramly; Original series (American): Fab 5 Freddy; Ed Lover; Doctor Dré; Revival series: T Money; Conceited; DJ Diamond Kuts
- Theme music composer: Nigel Cox-Hagen; Beau Tardy
- Country of origin: United States
- Original language: English
- No. of episodes: 1,838

Production
- Producers: Jac Benson II; Todd 1; Ted Demme; Theron "Tee Smif" Smith (Classic Cuts 2011)
- Cinematography: Jeff Muhlstock
- Editors: Rob Ortiz; Glenn Lazzaro; Rosanna Herrick
- Running time: 60 minutes (including commercials)
- Production companies: Revival series: HollandWest Productions; Clockwork Post; MTV Entertainment Studios

Original release
- Network: MTV Europe
- Release: October 1987 – December 1990
- Network: MTV
- Release: August 6, 1988 – August 17, 1995
- Network: Paramount+
- Release: May 24 – July 12, 2022

Related
- Rap City; Sucker Free

Yo! MTV Raps is a hip-hop music video program, which first aired on MTV Europe from October 1987 to December 1990 and on MTV from August 1988 to August 1995. The American version of the program (created by Ted Demme and Peter Dougherty) was the first hip hop music show on the network and was based on the original Europe show. Yo! MTV Raps produced a mix of rap videos, interviews with rap stars, live in-studio performances (on Fridays), and comedy.

== Hosts ==
The Europe version was hosted by its original creator Sophie Bramly. The American version was originally hosted by Fab 5 Freddy. Later, the show's main host was Doctor Dré and Demme's high school friend, Ed Lover who both hosted together on weekdays. Soon they were joined by Doctor Dre's Original Concept group member T Money, whilst Fab Five Freddy proceeded to host on weekends.

On the weekday version dubbed, Yo! MTV Raps Today (which debuted on March 13, 1989), Ed Lover created his own dance called the Ed Lover Dance (which was typically featured on Wednesdays) that became somewhat popular in the 1990s. The Ed Lover Dance was performed to the track "The 900 Number" by The 45 King.

== History ==
In October 1987, French journalist and producer Sophie Bramly developed and hosted the program Yo! for the then-nascent MTV Europe, with Afrika Bambaataa as the first guest. Later N.W.A, Public Enemy, LL Cool J, Ice-T, De La Soul, Eric B. & Rakim, EPMD or Ultramagnetic MCs were invited. On 6 August 1988, the American pilot episode was shown, hosted by Run DMC, with DJ Jazzy Jeff & the Fresh Prince as the program's first guests and Eric B. & Rakim's video for the title track of the album Follow the Leader as the first video shown on the program. The pilot was one of the highest rated programs to ever air on MTV at that point, with only the Video Music Awards and Live Aid receiving greater ratings.

Shinehead's "Chain Gang" was the first video to be shown during a regular-season episode. Meanwhile, Ice-T's "High Rollers" was the first video to be played during the weekday show. The classic Yo! MTV Raps logo was created by early graffiti writer, Dr. Revolt. The animated show open was produced by Nigel Cox-Hagen and animated by Beau Tardy.

=== Yo! MTV Raps and the spread of hip-hop ===
The advent of Yo! MTV Raps in the late 1980s was crucial to spreading hip-hop around the world. Through MTV Europe, MTV Asia, and through MTV Latino, African-American and Latino styles and sounds reached millions of people around the world, contributing to a growing global appreciation of hip-hop culture. This cultural influence was celebrated during the 20th anniversary of Yo! MTV Raps.

=== Rivalry ===
Although Video Music Box is often considered the first contender, in 1989, former rival BET created competition by premiering Rap City . The show was the longest-running hip-hop program because of its 19-year run (ending in 2009). While Yo! MTV Raps', which is now discontinued, generally focused on the rap scene from the East Coast and largely popular West Coast artists, Rap City also included videos from up-and-coming underground rappers from different regions of the US.

=== "Down with MTV" ===
One of the most popular artists to be featured on Yo! MTV Raps was Naughty by Nature. When MTV started its Down with MTV advertising campaign in 1992, Naughty by Nature's smash hit "O.P.P." was used as the basis.

=== Censorship and declining popularity ===
The ratings fell after pulling Public Enemy's video "By the Time I Get to Arizona" in 1991, claiming it was too violent. Also, Yo! MTV Raps almost declined to air the video for Cypress Hill's "How I Could Just Kill a Man." Only after Sheri Howell, Vice President of Music and Artist Development at MTV, intervened that MTV changed their minds.

By around 1992–93, MTV aired Yo! MTV Raps only once a week, for two hours, on Fridays after midnight.

=== The end of Yo! ===
Yo! MTV Raps had its series finale on August 17, 1995. Numerous high-profile names in the world of hip-hop closed the show out with a freestyle rap session, including Rakim, KRS-One, Redman, Method Man, Special Ed, Erick Sermon, Chubb Rock, Craig Mack, MC Serch of 3rd Bass, and Large Professor. Salt-N-Pepa holds the distinction of appearing on the first (technically, the first episode to feature Fab 5 Freddy) and last episodes of Yo! MTV Raps.

From 1996 to 1999, MTV repackaged it as simply Yo!, which was far more stripped-down and had a weekly slate of special guest hosts. For instance, Angie Martinez and Fatman Scoop served as its hosts. By 1998, Yo! had no guest hosts and became a one-hour program airing late Friday nights at 1 a.m. or 1:30 a.m. (Eastern Standard Time).

In 2000, MTV's outlet for hip-hop videos became Direct Effect, known since 2006 as Sucker Free. It aired three times a week at around 7:00 PM (Eastern Standard Time). It is one of the few music video outlets for MTV besides its late-night/early-morning music video rotation hours, as MTV continues to focus on non-music video programming, especially reality television shows.

=== Revivals ===
Yo! MTV Raps made a comeback of sorts, after an eight-year hiatus during the Jackassworld.com: 24 Hour Takeover in February 2008. It had Steve-O (alongside Sam Maccarone) promoting his new rap album, doing freestyles, and showing his new music video. The old set was carefully recreated, with Johnny Knoxville joking that Mike Judge created a brand new Beavis and Butt-Head episode with them critiquing Steve-O's rap video.

==== 20th anniversary ====
In April 2008, Yo! MTV Raps celebrated its 20th anniversary by making a comeback on MTV. MTV's show Sucker Free transformed into Yo! MTV Raps and featured classic hip-hop music videos as well as current hip-hop videos. Fab 5 Freddy, Doctor Dré and Ed Lover contributed to the tribute of the show. At the end of April 2008, MTV aired Yo! countdown shows and featured the top moments from the show during its airing on MTV.

==== 30th anniversary ====
Yo! MTV Raps was revived for a new generation in 2018, celebrating the 30th anniversary at Brooklyn's Barclays Center on June 1, 2018.

The live show featured Big Daddy Kane and the Juice Crew, Eric B & Rakim, Doug E. Fresh, KRS-One and Boogie Down Productions, EPMD, Flavor Flav, and many more. It also featured past hosts and DJs who helped shepherd the series, like Fab 5 Freddy, Ed Lover, Doctor Dré, T Money, Skribble, Red Alert, and Chuck Chillout. Tribute videos from artists like Eminem, Method Man, and Redman also commemorated the occasion.

==== Yo! MTV Raps International ====
In Spring 2019, Viacom International Media Networks relaunched the series with local versions in the UK, Germany, South-East Asia, and pan-African versions on MTV Base and MTV Africa. The Format and editorial of the series were headed by British TV producer Darcy Thomas. This also followed with a bi-weekly spin-off show Yo! MTV Rates hosted by Snoochie Shy and Poet, which aired in the UK and was also produced by Darcy Thomas for two seasons (16 episodes).

==== MTV Classic ====
Following the launch of MTV Classic on August 1, 2016, music video blocks have consistently aired on the network under the name Yo! Hip Hop Mix. When broadcast, however, this is merely an automated playlist of rap/hip-hop videos from the 1980s to the early 2000s.

==== Pluto TV ====
A Yo! MTV Raps channel was added to Pluto TV following Viacom's purchase of the service.

==== Paramount+ ====
On February 24, 2021, it was announced that Yo! MTV Raps would be revived on ViacomCBS' streaming platform Paramount+, formerly CBS All Access. On February 17, 2022, it was announced that Conceited and DJ Diamond Kuts would host the revival. On May 2, 2022, it was announced that the revival would premiere on May 24, 2022.

== References in popular culture ==
- In the ABC sitcom-drama Doogie Howser, M.D. from around the same time, Doogie is frequently seen wearing a Yo! MTV Raps white T-shirt, among other colors.
- A Magic: The Gathering podcast is named "Yo! MTG Taps", a reference to the "tapping" mechanic used in the game.
- There was a set of Yo! MTV Raps trading cards which featured the various hosts of the show and many of the artists whose videos were featured on the show.
- In the Ice Cube song "It Was a Good Day", the show is referenced in the lyrics "Went to Short Dog's house, they was watchin' Yo! MTV Raps".
- In the Juelz Santana song “Good Times”, the show is referenced in the lyrics "'Memba them ol' "Yo! MTV Raps" man, I hope they bring Yo! MTV back".

== See also ==
- Rap City
- Who's the Man?
