= Original Concept =

American hip hop group

Background information
- Origin: Long Island, New York, U.S.
- Genres: Hip hop
- Years active: 1986–1988
- Labels: Def Jam
- Past members: Doctor Dré; T-Money; Rapper G Easy G

Original Concept was an American 1980s hip-hop group from Long Island, New York, best known for their single "Can You Feel It".

== History ==
In the early 1980s, a group of young men at WBAU FM formed a group called the "Concept Crew". Their show "The Operating Room" was broadcast on Monday nights from Adelphi University on the same station which featured the Spectrum City DJs (Chuck D and Flavor Flav) who later went on to form Public Enemy. The members were Doctor Dré, T-Money, Rapper G, Easy G. By 1986, the group began calling themselves Original Concept and had released their first record, "Knowledge Me" in February of that year. The B-side of "Knowledge Me" went on to become their first single, "Can You Feel It". The single has since gone on to become one of the most sampled source records in hip-hop music.

In 1988, the group was signed to Def Jam Records and late in that year they released their first and only album, Straight From the Basement of Kooley High! on Def Jam. The album featured a cameo by Beastie Boys member, Mike D. on the track "She's Got a Moustache". The album featured samples from The Jackson 5, The Fat Boys, Run DMC, and P-Funk.

== Discography ==
Album information
Straight from the Basement of Kooley High!
- Released: 1988

Songwriting credits included Andre Brown / Gerald Gray / Tyrone Kelsie.
