= Jaheim discography =

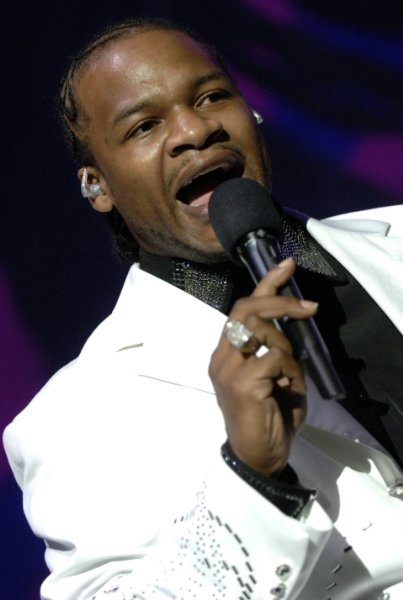
- Studio albums: 7
- Compilation albums: 1
- Singles: 18

This article contains the discography of American R&B singer Jaheim. This includes studio albums, compilation albums, and singles.

== Albums ==
=== Studio albums ===
Title	Album details	Peak positions			Certifications
Title	Album details	US	US R&B	UK	Certifications
Ghetto Love	Released: March 13, 2001; Label: Warner Bros.; Formats: CD, LP, digital download	9	2	50	RIAA: Platinum; BPI: Silver
Still Ghetto	Released: November 5, 2002; Label: Warner Bros.; Formats: CD, LP, digital download	8	3	80	RIAA: Platinum
Ghetto Classics	Released: February 13, 2006; Label: Warner Bros.; Formats: CD, digital download	1	1	—	RIAA: Gold
The Makings of a Man	Released: December 18, 2007; Label: Atlantic; Formats: CD, digital download	11	3	—	RIAA: Gold
Another Round	Released: February 9, 2010; Label: Atlantic; Formats: CD, digital download	3	2	—	
Appreciation Day	Released: September 3, 2013; Label: Atlantic; Formats: CD, digital download	6	3	—	
Struggle Love	Released: March 18, 2016; Label: BMG; Formats: CD, digital download	24	2	—	
"—" denotes a recording that did not chart or was not released in that territory.

=== Compilation albums ===
Title	Album details	Peak positions	
Title	Album details	US	US R&B
Classic Jaheim, Vol. 1	Released: November 25, 2008; Label: Warner Bros.; Formats: CD, digital download	168	18

== Singles ==
Year	Single	Chart positions			Certifications	Album
Year	Single	US	US R&B	UK	Certifications	Album
2000	"Could It Be"	26	2	33		Ghetto Love
2001	"Just in Case"	52	15	34	BPI: Silver	Ghetto Love
2002	"Anything" (featuring Next)	28	6	—		Ghetto Love
2002	"Anything for You" (featuring Duganz)	—	—	—		Bad Company (soundtrack)
2002	"Fabulous" (featuring Tha' Rayne)	28	7	41		Still Ghetto
2003	"Put That Woman First"	20	5	—		Still Ghetto
2003	"Backtight"	—	51	—		Still Ghetto
2003	"Diamond in da Ruff"	—	64	—		Still Ghetto
2005	"Everytime I Think About Her" (featuring Jadakiss)	—	38	119		Ghetto Classics
2006	"The Chosen One"	—	58	—		Ghetto Classics
2007	"Struggle No More (The Main Event)" (with Anthony Hamilton and Musiq Soulchild)	—	32	—		Daddy's Little Girls soundtrack
2007	"Never"	76	12	—		The Makings of a Man
2008	"Have You Ever"	—	65	—		The Makings of a Man
2008	"I've Changed" (featuring Keyshia Cole)	—	35	—		The Makings of a Man
2009	"Ain't Leavin Without You"	93	12	—		Another Round
2010	"Finding My Way Back"	95	12	—		Another Round
2013	"Age Ain't a Factor"	—	53	—		Appreciation Day
2013	"Baby x3"	—	—	—		Appreciation Day
2015	"Back in My Arms"	—	—	—		Struggle Love
2016	"Struggle Love"	—	—	—		Struggle Love
"—" denotes a recording that did not chart or was not released in that territory.

=== As a featured artist ===
Year	Single	Chart positions			Album
Year	Single	US	US R&B	UK	Album
2004	"My Place" (Nelly featuring Jaheim)	4	4	1	Suit
2011	"Stay Together" (Ledisi featuring Jaheim)	—	23	—	Pieces of Me
2017	"5000 Miles" (Johnny Gill featuring Jaheim)	—	21	—	Game Changer
"—" denotes a recording that did not chart or was not released in that territory.
