= Mary Brown (songwriter) =

American singer-songwriter

Mary Yvette Brown
- Born: New Jersey, United States
- Genres: R&B; soul; hip-hop
- Occupations: Singer-songwriter; session vocalist; background vocalist
- Labels: Reprise / Atlantic Records (1989–1992); Pattonium Management; Ms. Mary’s Music / BMI (present)
- Formerly of: Abstrac

Mary Brown is an American singer-songwriter best known for co-writing Destiny's Child "No, No, No", as well as Jaheim's "Fabulous". Brown was originally a member of girl-group trio Abstrac, signed to Reprise Records in 1989, which evolved into new jack swing duo M&M signed to Atlantic Records in 1990 as a result of shifting group membership. Both iterations of the group were able to release albums: An eponymous trio album in 1989 for Reprise, and a 1992 M&M album Get To Know Ya Betta on Atlantic. Brown moved into songwriting and background vocals when the group dissolved in 1992.

== Songwriting and production credits ==
Credits are courtesy of Discogs, Tidal, Apple Music, and AllMusic.

Title	Year	Artist	Album	Label
"This Is Not A Goodbye"	1995	Subway	Good Times	Biv Ten / Motown
"This Time"	1997	Taral Hicks	This Time	Motown
"Lose My Cool" (Featuring Redman)	1997	SWV	Release Some Tension	RCA Records
"No, No, No (P.1)"	1998	Destiny's Child	Destiny's Child	Columbia Records
"No, No, No (P.2)" (Featuring Wyclef Jean)	1998	Destiny's Child	Destiny's Child	Columbia Records
"Never Had A Love Like Mine" (Unreleased)	1998	Destiny's Child	Destiny's Child	Columbia Records
"Monifah's Anthem"/"Bad Girl" (Featuring Queen Pen)	1998	Monifah	Mo'hogany	Uptown / Universal Records
"Suga Suga"	1998	Monifah	Mo'hogany	Uptown / Universal Records
"Monifah's Anthem"/"Bad Girl II" (Featuring Queen Pen)	1998	Monifah	Mo'hogany	Uptown / Universal Records
"If You Only Knew"	1998	Tatyana Ali	Kiss the Sky	MJJ Music / Epic Records / Sony Music
"Dance Wit Me" (Featuring Doug E. Fresh)	1998	Miss Jones	The Other Woman	Motown
"What Ya Gonna Do" (Featuring Inaya Day)	1998	Queen Latifah	Order in the Court	Flavor Unit / Motown
"So They Say"	1999	Diana Ross	Every Day Is a New Day	Motown
"911" (Featuring Mary J. Blige)	2000	Wyclef Jean	The Ecleftic: 2 Sides II a Book	Columbia Records
"Dear Diary"	2000	3LW	3LW	Epic Records
"Fabulous" (Featuring Tha' Rayne)	2002	Jaheim	Still Ghetto	Divine Mill / Warner Bros. Records
"Put That Woman First"	2002	Jaheim	Still Ghetto	Divine Mill / Warner Bros. Records
"Past 12"	2002	Kelly Rowland	Simply Deep	Columbia Records
"Stronger"	2003	Gloria Gaynor	I Wish You Love	Logic Records
"You Keep Running"	2003	Gloria Gaynor	I Wish You Love	Logic Records
"Mm Mm Mm"	2004	Patti LaBelle	Timeless Journey	Def Soul Classics / Def Jam Recordings
"For My Girls"	2004	Tiffany Villarreal	Tiffany Villarreal	Universal Records
"Nine Months"	2004	Tiffany Villarreal	Tiffany Villarreal	Universal Records
"Mr. Fix It"	2004	The Temptations	Legacy	Motown
"R U Awake (LP)"	2005	Kieran Roberts	Breathe	Black Rain Records
"Bump"	2005	Kieran Roberts	Breathe	Black Rain Records
"R U Awake (Remix)" (Featuring Jadakiss)	2005	Kieran Roberts	Breathe	Black Rain Records
"More" (Featuring Anthony Hamilton)	2005	Syleena Johnson	Chapter 3: The Flesh	Jive Records
"Shoo Be Doo"	2007	Macy Gray	Big	Will.i.am Music Group / Geffen Records
"Bad Girl" (Featuring Missy Elliott)	2008	Danity Kane	Welcome to the Dollhouse	Bad Boy / Atlantic Records
"Secret Place" (Interlude)"	2008	Danity Kane	Welcome to the Dollhouse	Bad Boy / Atlantic Records
"Ecstasy" (Featuring Rick Ross)	2008	Danity Kane	Welcome to the Dollhouse	Bad Boy / Atlantic Records
"Not a Love Song"	2008	Donnie Klang	Just a Rolling Stone	Bad Boy / Atlantic Records
"Got Me Going"	2008	Day26	Day26	Bad Boy / Atlantic Records
"One More Drink"	2010	Heidi Montag	Superficial	Warner Music Group
"Remix This Heart"	2015	Kenny Lattimore	Anatomy of a Love Song	Sincere Soul / eOne
"Still (Family)" (With Ty Dolla Sign)	2021	YBN Nahmir	Visionland	Atlantic Records
"Talk of the Town"	2022	Jack Harlow	Come Home the Kids Miss You	Generation Now / Atlantic Records

== Background vocals ==
Title	Year	Artist	Album	Label
"D-O-G Me Out"	1990	Guy	The Future	Uptown Records
"Long Gone"	1990	Guy	The Future	Uptown Records
"One More Night"	1992	Bobby Brown	Bobby	MCA Records
"The Other Woman"	1992	Jacci McGhee	Jacci McGhee	MCA Records
"Das da Way We Like 'Em"	1992	TLC	Ooooooohhh... On the TLC Tip	LaFace Records
"Crossroads"	1993	LL Cool J	14 Shots to the Dome	Def Jam / Columbia Records
"Smile Again"	1994	Usher	Usher	LaFace / Arista Records
"Papa Luv It"	1995	LL Cool J	Mr. Smith	Def Jam / PolyGram
"Get It Together	1996	702	No Doubt	Motown
"Seven Days" (Featuring George Benson)	1997	Mary J. Blige	Share My World	MCA / Universal Music Group
"Before We Start"	1998	McGruff	Destined to Be	Uptown Records
"Damn (Should've Treated U Right)" (Featuring Ja Rule)	1999	So Plush	Blue Streak (soundtrack)	Epic Records
"Another Lover" (Jerry Duplessis Mix)"	2001	Dane Bowers	Facing the Crowd	Northwestside / Arista Records
"Whatever Happens"	2001	Michael Jackson	Invincible	MJJ Music / Epic Records
"Thug Like Me"	2002	Wyclef Jean	Masquerade	Columbia Records
"She Is"	2004	Carl Thomas	Let's Talk About It	Bad Boy Records
"Catch My Breath"	2008	Donnie Klang	Just a Rolling Stone	Bad Boy / Atlantic Records

== Guest appearances ==
List of guest appearances, with other performing artists, showing year released and album name
Title	Year	Other performer(s)	Album
"Down With You"	1998	Montell Jordan	I Got the Hook-Up (soundtrack)
"On The Phone"	2010	Aasim	Off The Shelf

== Awards and nominations ==
Year	Awarding Body	Award	Result	Ref
1999	BMI Urban Awards	Award-winning Songs ("No, No, No")	Won	
1999	BMI Pop Awards	Award-winning Songs ("No, No, No")	Won	
2001	BMI Urban Awards	Award-winning Songs ("911")	Won	
2004	BMI Urban Awards	Award-winning Songs ("Fabulous")	Won	
