= Tell Me (Diddy song) =

Single by P. Diddy featuring Christina Aguilera

from the album Press Play
- Released: November 7, 2006
- Studio: Baseline Recording Studios (New York, NY); Daddy's House Recording Studios (New York, NY); Chalice Studios (Los Angeles, CA); Record Plant (Los Angeles, CA)
- Genre: Hip hop
- Length: 4:10
- Label: Bad Boy; Atlantic
- Songwriters: Elizabeth Bingham; Sean Combs; Stephen "Static Major" Garrett; Shannon Jones; Jack Knight; Shannon Lawrence; Ryan "Royce" Montgomery; Leroy Watson
- Producer: Just Blaze

P. Diddy singles chronology
"Come to Me" (2006)	"Tell Me" (2006)	"We Fly High (Remix)" (2006)

Christina Aguilera singles chronology
"Hurt" (2006)	"Tell Me" (2006)	"Candyman" (2007)

Music video
- "Tell Me" on YouTube

"Tell Me" is a song by American rapper P. Diddy from his fourth studio album, Press Play (2006), featuring guest vocals from American singer Christina Aguilera. The song was written by Combs himself, Stephen "Static Major" Garrett, Ryan "Royce" Montgomery, Elizabeth Bingham, Shannon Jones, Jack Knight, Shannon Lawrence and Leroy Watson, with production held by Just Blaze. The song was originally meant to be on Danity Kane's debut album. It is the second single from the above-mentioned album. According to All Access, the single hit radio stations on November 7, 2006.

Most contemporary critics responded positively towards "Tell Me", and particular praise was directed at Aguilera's vocal delivery, while the song itself was complimented for its "catchy hook". The single charted within the top ten on the record charts of Germany, Switzerland, Finland, South Africa, Ireland and the United Kingdom. Its music video was nominated for the MTV Australia Video Music Award.

== Background and composition ==
According to Diddy, the song "Tell Me" is about "that male–female interaction in the club", and about "that cat and mouse chase that happens when you don't know somebody but your eye catches them". The rapper explained the theme of the song and the song's background on the episode of MTV's Making the Video season thirteen:

"I wanted to do a hip-hop/soul song with Christina. I wanted to do a song [with her], cause she's known for her great range, her incredible vocals. I wanted to do something that's a little bit more "street", a little bit more ghetto, with her beautiful vocals on top of it."

The song was co-written by R&B singer–songwriters Static Major and Yummy Bingham. Diddy's rap was written with Royce da 5'9", who "wrote at least 40 verses" until Diddy was satisfied with the final lyrics, which incorporated various parts from these verses. "Tell Me" is written in the key of A♭ minor with a tempo of 99 beats per minute.

== Critical reception ==
"Tell Me" received generally positive reviews from music critics. Andy Kellman of AllMusic highlighted this song on the Press Play album, and considered Aguilera's appearance as "noteworthy", a sentiment also shared by The Guardian's Alexis Petridis, and Chris Evans of Blogcritics, who stated that "Christina's catchy hook truly makes the song". Reviewing the album for Entertainment Weekly, Will Hermes praised two songs — "Tell Me" and "Making It Hard" — noting that featured artists Christina Aguilera and Mary J. Blige "are on fire". Christian Hoard from Rolling Stone described "Tell Me" as a "dark, manically smitten love song". Los Angeles Times editors Natalie Nichols and Serena Kim wrote that Diddy gives Aguilera a "task on the club-thumping."

Mike Joseph of PopMatters wrote that: "Pop princess Christina Aguilera serves as little more than hook girl on her guest spot." Ben Hogwood from musicOMH opined that "the edgy song, 'Tell Me', takes Christina Aguilera back to sultry vocalizing". Sal Cinquemani, writing for Slant Magazine, believed that Aguilera's vocals on the song are "uncharacteristically restrained" [for her standards]. IndieLondon editor Jack Foley noted that the song "positively drips with vibrancy", and praised it for Aguilera's "gutsy vocals" and its "slick body-rocking beats".

=== Rankings ===
Accolades for "Tell Me"
Critic/Publication	List	Rank	Ref.
Billboard	Christina Aguilera's Top 20 Billboard Hits	16	
The Official Charts Company	Christina Aguilera's Official Top 20 Biggest Selling Singles	13	

== Commercial performance ==
The song reached the top 10 in the United Kingdom, reaching number eight, and entered the top 20 in 15 countries. The song debuted on the Top 75 singles chart in the UK at number 20, based on download sales alone, during the week ending December 10. In the United States, "Tell Me" charted at number 47 on the Billboard Hot 100, becoming Diddy's lowest-charting single since "Diddy" peaked at number 66 in 2001.

== Music video ==
The video for "Tell Me" was shot during the last week of September 2006 in Los Angeles and was directed by Erik White. The video was premiered on Total Request Live October 30, 2006. The video entered the TRL charts two days later at number ten. It also premiered on BET's 106 & Park on November 1, 2006. In the UK the video was premiered on the November 17, 2006, being the same day Aguilera kicked off her world tour.

"It's about when two superpowers get together. We're two superpowers in the music industry, it's not a typical thing for us to get together — that's really the concept of the video. It's supposed to make you dance, it's supposed to make you feel good, it's supposed to be something really good for you all to look at."

— Diddy on the music video's concept.

The video begins with Diddy in a virtually empty white room except for the stereo equipment, with the track "Diddy Rock" (featuring Timbaland) — another song from Press Play — playing in the background. After his attractive female assistant asks Diddy if he wants her to "press play", the speakers and TV turn on and the track begins. While Diddy raps, he is blown away by the power of the speakers, and Aguilera is seen on the television. By the time Aguilera's catchy hook comes in, the white room has shattered and Diddy and Aguilera are seen on either side of a fan in some sort of dark wind tunnel. In the video the music gets so intense, that the stereo equipment and the room gets blown away.

Aguilera is seen in a classy, yet modern look for the video, in contrast to the 1920s and '30s glamorous look she has used to promote her own album. This setting then shatters in the middle of the second verse to feature clips of the two performers, as well as backup dancers, performing in front of flashing neon lights. As the song ends, the camera zooms out to show that the lights form the promotional Press Play symbol associated with the album.

According to Diddy, "the concept of the video is about energy, when two forces, two strong energies get together; how things start to just go crazy". In the episode of MTV's Making the Video Aguilera herself noted that it's a "pretty straightforward, simple kind of concept but it will come off looking very modernized and high-fashion".

== Live performances ==
"Tell Me" was never promoted in the Fall of 2006 after Diddy released his fourth studio album Press Play. The song was performed for the first time in May 2023, by Aguilera herself, during Usher's Lovers & Friends music festival in Las Vegas.

During the year 2023 alone, Aguilera performed the song four more times: at Smukfest in Denmark, at the Regnum Carya in Turkey, during a concert in Rishon LeZion, Israel, as well as at the EuroPride concert in Malta, in front of an audience of 38,000 people.

== Awards and nominations ==
Year	Ceremony	Category	Result	Ref.
2007	BDSCertified Spin Awards	50,000 Spins	Won	
2007	International Dance Music Awards	Best Hip-Hop/Dance Track	Nominated	
2007	MTV Australia Video Music Awards	Best Hook-Up	Nominated	

== Track listing ==
CD single

1. "Tell Me" (Explicit Album Version) (featuring Christina Aguilera) – 4:06
2. "Tell Me" (Instrumental) (featuring Christina Aguilera) – 4:26
3. "Tell Me" (A Cappella) (featuring Christina Aguilera) – 4:36
4. "Come to Me" (Explicit Version) (featuring Nicole Scherzinger, Yung Joc, Young Dro & T.I.) – 3:51

== Charts ==
=== Weekly charts ===
Chart (2006–2007)	Peak position
Australia (ARIA)	13
Australian Urban (ARIA)	5
Austria (Ö3 Austria Top 40)	19
Belgium (Ultratop 50 Flanders)	17
Belgium (Ultratop 50 Wallonia)	24
Denmark (Tracklisten)	24
Europe (Eurochart Hot 100)	13
Finland (Suomen virallinen lista)	2
Germany (GfK)	5
Germany (Deutsche Black Charts)	3
Ireland (IRMA)	8
Lithuania (EHR)	6
Netherlands (Dutch Top 40)	13
Netherlands (Single Top 100)	26
Romania (Romanian Top 100)	18
Romanian Internet Chart (Top 100)	6
Scotland (OCC)	13
South African Airplay (RISA)	1
Switzerland (Schweizer Hitparade)	7
UK Singles (OCC)	8
UK Hip Hop/R&B (OCC)	1
US Billboard Hot 100	47
US Dance Club Songs (Billboard)	34
US Hot Rap Songs (Billboard)	14
US Hot R&B/Hip-Hop Songs (Billboard)	38
US Pop Airplay (Billboard)	25
US Rhythmic Airplay (Billboard)	25

=== Year-end charts ===
Chart (2006)	Position
UK Singles (OCC)	169

Chart (2007)	Position
Australia (ARIA)	99
Australian Urban (ARIA)	34
Europe (Eurochart Hot 100)	68
Germany (Official German Charts)	58
Switzerland (Schweizer Hitparade)	69
UK Singles (OCC)	113

== Certifications ==
Region	Certification	Certified units/sales
United Kingdom (BPI)	Silver	200,000^{‡}
^{‡} Sales+streaming figures based on certification alone.
