= Dinky Bingham =

American musician

Dinky Bingham (born Osborne Gould Bingham, Jr., 1963 in Jamaica, Queens, New York) is an American singer, musician, songwriter, producer, and engineer.

== Biography ==
Raised in Jamaica, Queens, and now based in Philadelphia, Pennsylvania, Bingham is the son of a preacher. He started in the music industry as a pianist and vocalist in 1982 for the then-new Phonogram studios, where he recorded several tracks on the White Soul album project with underground jazz artists. In 1985, he joined the Christian group New Witness.

A few years later, Bingham was called to replace lead vocalist Mark Stevens into the Queens-based funk trio The Jamaïca Boys, which also included Marcus Miller and Lenny White. After hit singles such as "Move It", "Shake It Up", or "Pick Up The Phone", the group disbanded and Bingham became a full-time producer.

Bingham is the CEO of Dinky B. Music, a production/publishing company based in Philadelphia. He has produced gold and platinum hits for artists such as Changing Faces, New Edition, Kylie Minogue and Jaheim, in addition to creating several remixes for artists such as Chaka Khan, Zhané, Paula Abdul, and Bobby Brown. Bingham also served as musical director for the R&B group Guy, and has been the mentor to several current successful hip-hop/R&B producers such as Supa Dave West, Rockwilder and Jimi Kendrix.

Bingham married his wife Sonja (Walton) in 1997. He has three sons and two daughters, including singer-songwriter Elizabeth "Yummy" Bingham.

== Discography ==
- 1989 – Pieces of a Dream – Bout Dat Time – (Producer, keyboards, Back Vocals)
- 1990 – Jamaica Boys – J Boys – (Lead Vocals, Keyboards)
- 1991 – Nicki Richards – Naked – (Keyboards)
- 1992 – Miki Howard – Femme Fatale – (Piano)
- 1992 – Big Bub – Comin' At Cha – (Producer)
- 1992 – Milira – Back Again !!! – (Piano)
- 1993 – Trendz of Culture – Trendz – (Producer, Keyboards)
- 1994 – Debelah Morgan – Debelah – (Piano)
- 1994 – Changing Faces – (Producer)
- 1994 – 2 Technocal: The 2nd Wave – (vocals)
- 1994 – Eric Gable – Process Of Elimination (Back Vocals)
- 1995 – Adina Howard – Do You Wanna Ride – (Producer)
- 1995 – Subway – Good Times – (Producer)
- 1996 – France Gall – France – (Vocal Arrangements, Vocals)
- 1996 – Nu Colours – (Producer)
- 1996 – Lord Finesse – The Awakening – (Keyboards)
- 1996 – New Edition – Home Again – (Producer)
- 1997 – Rahsaan Patterson – (Producer, Vocals)
- 1997 – Bobby Brown – Forever (+ bonus tracks) – (Remix)
- 1997 – Farley & Heller – Journeys By DJ – (Producer)
- 1997 – Yvette Michele – My Dream – (Producer)
- 1998 – Lionel Richie – Time – (Producer)
- 1998 – Soundtrack – Streets Is Watching – (Producer)
- 1998 – Fat Joe – Don Cartagena – (Keyboards)
- 1998 – Joel Kipnis – What's The Word – (Keyboards, Vocals)
- 1999 – Brixx – Everything Happens... – (Keyboards)
- 1999 – Calvin Richardson – Country Boy – (Producer, Back vocals)
- 1999 – Dr. Dre – 2001 – (Keyboards)
- 2000 – Marcus Miller – Best Of – (Vocals)
- 2001 – Kylie Minogue – Light Years – (Producer)
- 2001 – Alana Davis – Fortune Cookies – (Keyboards)
- 2001 – Damage – Since You've Been Gone – (Producer)
- 2002 – Joi Gilliam – Star Kitty's Revenge – (Keyboards)
- 2002 – Warrior – Perfect Weapon – (Producer)
- 2002 – Lil' Rowdy – Harlem's Heart – (Arranger, Mixing)
- 2002 – Jaheim – Still Ghetto – (Producer)
- 2002 – Next – The Next Episode – (Producer)
- 2003 – Mýa – Moodring (Keyboards)
- 2003 – Najee – Embrace (Producer)
- 2003 – Tha' Rayne – Reign Supreme (Producer)
- 2004 – Pete Belasco – Deeper (Organ)
- 2004 – The Temptations – Legacy (Producer)
- 2004 – Patti LaBelle – Timeless Journey (Producer, Engineer)
- 2005 – Ray Charles – Genius & Friends (Engineer)
- 2005 – Kindred the Family Soul – In This Life Together (Producer, Engineer)
- 2006 – Yummy Bingham – The First Seed (Producer)
- 2006 – Black Sheep – 8wm (Producer)
- 2010 – 9th Life – Cost of Living (Producer)
