= Press Play (album) =

Studio album by P. Diddy
- Released: October 17, 2006
- Genres: Hip-hop; club; R&B
- Length: 78:58
- Labels: Bad Boy; Atlantic
- Producers: Sean "P. Diddy" Combs; The Hitmen; Kanye West; Danja; Rob Lewis; Just Blaze; Timbaland; will.i.am; The Neptunes; Rich Harrison; Havoc; Jai

P. Diddy chronology
We Invented the Remix (2002)	Press Play (2006)	Last Train to Paris (2010)

Singles from Press Play
- 1. "Come to Me" Released: September 12, 2006; 2. "Tell Me" Released: November 7, 2006; 3. "Last Night" Released: February 27, 2007; 4. "Through the Pain (She Told Me)" Released: July 2007

Press Play is the fourth studio album by American rapper Sean Combs, under the names P. Diddy and Diddy. It was released on Monday October 16 and Tuesday October 17, 2006 respectively, by Bad Boy Records in a joint venture with Warner Music Group's Atlantic Records, serving as his only album with the label. Press Play was intended to be released under Combs' stage name of simply "Diddy", but a lawsuit from DJ Richard "Diddy" Dearlove effectively prevented him from doing so; however, it was released under Combs' "Diddy" name in regions in which it was not registered.

Musically, Press Play predominantly features guest contributions from R&B and hip-hop performers including Nicole Scherzinger, Christina Aguilera, Keyshia Cole, Brandy, Jamie Foxx, Ciara, Nas, Timbaland, Mary J. Blige, CeeLo Green, Keri Hilson, Big Boi, Mario Winans, Avant and Fergie, among others. Primarily dance-pop and hip-hop-oriented in sound, it is a loose conceptual album with lyrical themes discussing the ups and downs of a relationship.

The album was preceded by the single "Come to Me", which peaked within the top ten of the Billboard Hot 100. After the album's release, it spawned the singles "Tell Me", "Last Night" and "Through the Pain (She Told Me)". It became available to the preview on MTV's The Leak on October 10, 2006, one week before the album was sold in stores. Press Play received generally mixed to positive reviews from music critics.

== Critical reception ==
Professional ratings
Aggregate scores
Source	Rating
Metacritic	62/100
Review scores
Source	Rating
About.com	3/5 stars
AllMusic	4/5 stars
Entertainment Weekly	B
The Guardian	3/5 stars
Los Angeles Times	2/4 stars
MusicOMH	4/5 stars
PopMatters	6/10
Rolling Stone	2.5/5 stars
Slant Magazine	3/5 stars
USA Today	2.5/4 stars

According to the review aggregator Metacritic, Press Play received "generally favorable reviews" based on a weighted average score of 62 out of 100 from 19 critic scores. AllMusic rated the album four stars out of five, with Andy Kellman praising the choice of featured artists: "...the roster of collaborators and guests is both extensive and impressive..." Will Hermes of Entertainment Weekly, in grading the album with a B, had mild praise for Diddy's rapping style: "While Combs isn't a great rapper, he's more nimble and lyrically substantive than usual." However, Hermes also commented that the drug references and profanities in the lyrics "don't square with Diddy's current CEO persona." However, several reviewers had mixed views, praising the musical styles while questioning Diddy's rapping abilities. Christian Hoard of Rolling Stone wrote: "Diddy's rhymes are more adept than they used to be, but his flat voice and retro boasts drag things down." For The Guardian, Alexis Petridis commented: "The musical brilliance that surrounds him only serves to highlight Combs's shortcomings as a rapper." Petridis also criticized Diddy for "halting delivery" and "self-aggrandisement."

Los Angeles Times critic Natalie Nichols commented that Diddy was "innovative and versatile" for favoring instrumentation over sampling and integrating different styles like funk and drum and bass. However, Nichols rated the album two stars out of four, as she considered some of the tracks "overly long and overblown". For About.com, Ivan Rott praised the album overall as a "nice, eclectic musical journey" but was ambivalent about the songwriting, calling some tracks "mature, albeit schmaltzy" and others "arrogant". Similarly, Mike Joseph had a 6-of-10 review for PopMatters, calling the album "quite easy to listen to" but panning some tracks as "forgettable". Slant Magazine rated the album three out of five stars, with Sal Cinquemani acknowledging it "might be the best-produced album" of 2006 but criticizing the songwriting: "Diddy still doesn’t have an original bone in his body or a fresh idea in his head..." For Billboard, Jeff Vrabel criticized the lyrical themes as "eye-rollingly egomaniacal even by Diddy standards" but praised the album as "a solid and often appealing party jam". Elysa Gardner of USA Today found there to be "a few cringe-inducing interludes". Other critics had harsher criticisms. Kelefa Sanneh of The New York Times regarded Press Play as "a garish, puzzling album" and "[not] the sort of CD people pick up when they want to explain what’s great about hip-hop." Chet Betz of Cokemachineglow rated the album 35 percent, calling Diddy a "voice that bumbles through every song".

== Commercial performance ==
Press Play debuted at number one on the US Billboard 200, with first-week sales of 170,000 copies. It was Combs second album to open atop the chart after No Way Out (1997). On November 21, 2006, it was certified Gold by the Recording Industry Association of America (RIAA) for Shipments figures in excess of 500,000 copies. By September 2007, Press Play had sold 703,000 units, according to Nielsen SoundScan.

== Track listing ==
Press Play track listing
No.	Title	Writer(s)	Producer(s)	Length
1.	"Testimonial (Intro)"	Sean Combs; Leroy Watson; Roland Orzabal; Curt Smith	P. Diddy; J-Dub	2:24
2.	"We Gon' Make It" (featuring Jack Knight)	Combs; Jack Knight; Watson; Jayceon Taylor; Johnny Pate; Kevin Hansford	K-Def; P. Diddy^{[a]}	3:33
3.	"I Am (Interlude)"	Combs; Watson; Deleno Matthews; Levar Coppin; Brenda Davis; Berry Gordy; Patrice Holloway; Frank Wilson	Grind Music; P. Diddy	1:46
4.	"The Future"	Combs; Kejuan Muchita; Troy Jamerson	Havoc	3:11
5.	"Hold Up" (featuring Angela Hunte)	Combs; Glenn C. Johnson; Muchita; Jamerson; Angela Hunte; Jerry Peters	SC; Havoc^{[a]}	3:29
6.	"Come to Me" (featuring Nicole Scherzinger)	Combs; Mike Winans; Jacoby White; Shay Winans; Nicole Scherzinger; Shannon "Slam" Lawrence; Roger Greene Jr.; Richard Frierson; Yakubu Izuagbe	Jai; Younglord; P. Diddy	4:36
7.	"Tell Me" (featuring Christina Aguilera)	Combs; Knight; Watson; Shannon Jones; Lawrence; Ryan Montgomery; Stephen Garrett; Elizabeth Wyce; Justin Smith	Just Blaze	4:06
8.	"Wanna Move" (featuring Ciara, Big Boi, and Scar)	Combs; Nathaniel Hills; Antwan Patton; Terrence Smith; Clifford Harris, Jr.; White; Ciara Princess Harris; Kristal Oliver	Danja; Big Boi^{[b]}	5:18
9.	"Diddy Rock" (featuring Shawnna, Twista, and Timbaland)	Combs; Hill; Timothy Mosley; Carl Mitchell; Pierre Jones; Lloyd Mathis	Danja	5:12
10.	"Claim My Place (Interlude)" (featuring Avant and The Movement Orchestra)	Combs; Mike Winans; Lawrence; Rob Lewis	Rob Lewis	3:25
11.	"Everything I Love" (featuring Nas and Cee-Lo Green)	Combs; Watson; Nasir Jones; Kanye West; Thomas DeCarlo Callaway	Kanye West; P. Diddy^{[a]}	4:23
12.	"Special Feeling" (featuring Mika Lett)	Combs; Will Adams	will.i.am; P. Diddy; Mario Winans^{[b]}	4:25
13.	"Crazy Thang (Interlude)" (featuring S. Rosete)	Combs; Lewis	Rob Lewis	1:15
14.	"After Love" (featuring Keri Hilson)	Combs; Mosley; Hill; Keri Lynn Hilson; White; James Washington	Timbaland; Danja	4:47
15.	"Through the Pain (She Told Me)" (featuring Mario Winans)	Mario Winans; Combs; White	Mario Winans; P. Diddy^{[a]}	5:28
16.	"Thought You Said" (featuring Brandy)	Mario Winans; Combs; Watson; Michael "Lo Down" Jones; Sean Garrett; S. Jones	Mario Winans; P. Diddy^{[a]}	5:49
17.	"Last Night" (featuring Keyshia Cole)	Combs; Knight; Mario Winans; Lawrence	Mario Winans; P. Diddy^{[a]}	6:26
18.	"Making It Hard" (featuring Mary J. Blige)	Combs; Watson; Rich Harrison; Sean Garrett; P. Jones; Wyce; Regional Garland	Rich Harrison	4:54
19.	"Partners for Life" (featuring Jamie Foxx)	Combs; Robert Ross; Watson; Pharrell Williams	The Neptunes	4:31

Best Buy bonus track
No.	Title	Writer(s)	Producer(s)	Length
20.	"All Night Long" (featuring Fergie)	Combs; Adams; Stacy Ferguson	will.i.am	6:25
21.	"Get Off"	Combs; Deleno Matthews; Levar Coppin; Miles Davis	Sean C & LV	4:28

Limited edition

- The limited-edition version of the album includes a story of photos on how P. Diddy met a woman in a club. The album is located in a pocket on the last page; as well as these exclusive versions that were released from Target and Best Buy, Target having a bonus DVD and Best Buy including a bonus track, called "Get Off".

Notes

- ^{^[a]} signifies a co-producer
- ^{^[b]} signifies an additional producer

Sample credits

- "Testimonial (Intro)" samples from "Head Over Heels" by Tears for Fears.
- "We Gon' Make It" samples from "Shaft in Africa" by Johnny Pate.
- "I Am (Interlude)" samples excerpts from "You've Made Me So Very Happy" by Lou Rawls.
- "Hold Up" samples excerpts from "White Shutters" by Jerry Peters.
- "Special Feeling" samples from "Baby I'm a Star" by Prince.
- "Making It Hard" samples excerpts from "I Need Love" by Hunts Determination.
- "Last Night" samples from "Erotic City" by Prince.
- "Get Off" samples excerpts from the composition "Spanish Key" as written and performed by Miles Davis.

== Personnel ==
Production

- Sean "P. Diddy" Combs
- The Hitmen
- Danja
- Rob Lewis
- Just Blaze
- Timbaland
- Kanye West
- will.i.am
- The Neptunes
- Rich Harrison
- Havoc
- Jai

Writing credits:

- The Game and Aasim - "We Gon' Make It"
- Pharoahe Monch - "The Future", "Hold Up"
- Jody Breeze (from Boyz n da Hood) - "Wanna Move", "Through the Pain (She Told Me)", "After Love"
- T.I. - "Wanna Move"
- Mista Raja - "Come to Me"
- Royce Da 5'9" - "Tell Me"
- Ness (formerly of Da Band) & Matthew Winans - "Diddy Rock"
- Yummy Bingham and Aasim - "Tell Me"
- Yummy Bingham and Cardan - "Tell Me"
- Static Major - "Tell Me"
- Black Rob and Aasim - "Partners for Life"
- Mike Brown - "Last Night", "Diddy Rock"
- Nas and Aasim - "Everything I Love"

== Charts ==
=== Weekly charts ===
Weekly chart performance for Press Play
Chart (2006–07)	Peak position
Australian Albums (ARIA)	41
Austrian Albums (Ö3 Austria)	41
Belgian Albums (Ultratop Flanders)	39
Belgian Albums (Ultratop Wallonia)	22
Danish Albums (Hitlisten)	24
Dutch Albums (Album Top 100)	58
French Albums (SNEP)	31
German Albums (Offizielle Top 100)	32
Irish Albums (IRMA)	13
Italian Albums (FIMI)	84
Swedish Albums (Sverigetopplistan)	46
Swiss Albums (Schweizer Hitparade)	9
UK Albums (Official Charts)	11
UK R&B Albums (Official Charts)	1
US Billboard 200	1
US Top R&B/Hip-Hop Albums (Billboard)	1
US Top Rap Albums (Billboard)	1

=== Year-end charts ===
2006 year-end chart performance for Press Play
Chart (2006)	Position
Australian Urban Albums (ARIA)	48
US Top R&B/Hip-Hop Albums (Billboard)	69

2007 year-end chart performance for Press Play
Chart (2007)	Position
Australian Urban Albums (ARIA)	40
French Albums (SNEP)	105
UK Albums (OCC)	179
US Billboard 200	146
US Top R&B/Hip-Hop Albums (Billboard)	52

== Certifications ==
Certifications for Press Play
Region	Certification	Certified units/sales
Ireland (IRMA)	Gold	7,500^{^}
United Kingdom (BPI)	Gold	100,000^{^}
United States (RIAA)	Gold	500,000^{^}
^{^} Shipments figures based on certification alone.
