= Classic Jaheim, Vol. 1 =

Compilation album by Jaheim
- Released: November 25, 2008
- Genre: R&B
- Length: 36 minutes
- Label: Warner Bros.

Professional ratings
Review scores
Source	Rating
Allmusic	link

Classic Jaheim Vol. 1 is the first compilation album of Jaheim released on November 25, 2008 by Warner Bros. Records.

== Track listing ==
1. "Anything" (Featuring Next)
2. "Put That Woman First"
3. "Just in Case"
4. "Fabulous" (Featuring Tha' Rayne)
5. "Everytime I Think About Her (Featuring Jadakiss)
6. "The Chosen One"
7. "Could It Be"
8. "Diamond in da Ruff"
9. "Looking for Love"

== Charts ==
=== Weekly charts ===
Chart (2008)	Peak position
US Billboard 200	168
US Top R&B/Hip-Hop Albums (Billboard)	18

=== Year-end charts ===
Chart (2009)	Position
US Top R&B/Hip-Hop Albums (Billboard)	100
