= Yummy Bingham =

American singer (born 1986)

- Born: Elizabeth T. Wyce Bingham; January 7, 1986 (age 40)
- Origin: Queens, New York City, U.S.
- Genres: R&B; hip hop; hip hop soul
- Occupations: Singer; songwriter
- Years active: 2000–present
- Labels: Arista; Cash Money; Motown
- Formerly of: Tha' Rayne

Elizabeth T. Wyce "Yummy" Bingham (born January 7, 1986) is an American singer.

== Biography ==
Bingham was born on January 7, 1986, to R&B producer Dinky Bingham and Patricia Wyce. She was put into her grandparents care in South Jamaica, Queens. She is the god-daughter of Chaka Khan and Aaron Hall.

== Career ==
In 2000, at age 14, Bingham was recruited by producer KayGee to form the group Tha' Rayne, signed to Arista. The group recorded an album, appeared on a bunch of labelmates tracks including Jaheim's Fabulous that hit #1 on the US Billboard Adult R&B chart for three weeks from February 1, 2003, to February 22, 2003. The group released the single "Didn't You Know", peaking at #76 in September 2003 on the US Billboard R&B chart. Their debut album, "Reign Supreme" never came out and the group disbanded in 2005.

While being a member of Tha' Rayne, Bingham was also getting a name for herself as the appointed vocalist of veteran hip-hop group De La Soul, being featured on various of their songs and singles, and accompanying them on tour between 2000 and 2004. From 2003, Bingham started to collaborate to various artists, getting writing and/or vocals credits on songs from Talib Kweli, Patti LaBelle, Lupe Fiasco, Black Sheep, P. Diddy, Christina Aguilera Mary J. Blige, Sunshine Anderson, Busta Rhymes, Nas, Keyshia Cole, Amerie, Mýa or Monica.

At age 18, Bingham became the youngest female CEO of a major-affiliated label and the youngest female record executive. She formed the label "Muzic Park" with Grammy award-winning beatmaker Rockwilder and was the label's first artist through a record deal with Motown in the United States and Island Records in the United Kingdom,. She released the singles "Come Get It", "Is It Good To You" and "One More Chance" and released her debut album The First Seed in the UK in October 2006.

She continued writing and recording for other artists and gave birth to her daughter Aviela in September 2007. She took some time out of the record industry to do Gospel/Inspirational music but eventually returned to secular R&B in 2010 with a new song called "Circles" that was featured in the movie "King of Paper Chasin". She also announced acting projects.

In 2013, she teamed up with alternative R&B producer Nyce Hitz to record new material. From October 29 to December 31, 2013, Bingham offered a music series entitled "Taste Tuesdays" consisting of the release through the online music magazine Singersroom, of 10 unreleased songs, most of them being exclusive songs not appearing on her 10-tracks mixtape "No Artificial Flavorz" that she released subsequently, on January 7, 2014, promoted by singles "Cuffin" and "Can We Stay" (featuring Kardinal Offishall). The same year Bingham was featured on Cam'ron's single "So Bad" with Nicki Minaj.

In April 2015, Bingham released the single "Hard to Love".

== Discography ==
=== Albums ===
Year	Album	Chart positions	
Year	Album	US	UK
2006	The First Seed: 1st studio album; Released: October 9, 2006 (UK); Formats: CD, digital download	—	—
2014	No Artificial Flavorz: EP; Released: January 7, 2014 (US); Formats: Digital download	—	—

=== Singles as a solo performer ===
Year	Title	Peak chart positions^{[a]}				Album
Year	Title	US	US R&B	UK	UK R&B	Album
2015	"Hard To Love": Digital Download (US) : April 20, 2015	-	-	-	-	Non-album single
2014	"Can We Stay" (featuring Kardinal Offishall): Digital Download (US) : January 7, 2014	-	-	-	-	No Artificial Flavorz
2013	"Cuffin": Digital Download (US) : June 2013	-	-	-	-	No Artificial Flavorz
2006	"One More Chance": Radio Impact (US) : April 24, 2006; Digital Download (US) : May 2, 2006; 12" Single (US) : May 23, 2006	-	-	-	-	The First Seed
2006	"Is It Good To You": 12" Single (US) : December 20, 2005; Digital Download (US) : January 3, 2006; Radio Impact (US) : March 7, 2006	-	-	-	-	The First Seed
2005 US, 2006 UK	"Come Get It" (featuring Jadakiss): Digital Download (US): May 10, 2005; Radio Impact (US): August 2, 2005; Digital Download (UK) : June 12, 2006; 12" Single (UK) : October 2, 2006; CD Single (UK) : October 2, 2006	-	-	82	38	The First Seed

=== Singles as featured performer ===
Year	Title	Chart positions				Album
Year	Title	US Hot 100	US R&B	UK	UK R&B	Album
2017	"Heads Up Eyes Open" (Talib Kweli featuring Rick Ross and Yummy Bingham): Digital Download (US): September 29, 2017	—	—	—	—	Radio Silence
2016	"I'm Done" (B. Slade featuring Yummy Bingham)	—	—	—	—	TBA
2014	"So Bad" (Cam'ron featuring Nicki Minaj and Yummy): Digital Download (US) : July 15, 2014	—	85	—	—	1st of the Month Vol. 2
2014	"Melody" (Gene Noble featuring Yummy Bingham): Digital Download (US) : July 2, 2014	—	—	—	—	Gun Hill soundtrack
2011	"All My Love" (Tiron & Ayomari featuring Yummy Bingham): Digital Download (US): September 23, 2011	—	—	—	—	Sucker For Pumps
2003	"Much More" (De La Soul featuring DJ Premier and Yummy): 12" Single (UK) : August 4, 2003	—	—	85	—	The Grind Date
2001 US, 2002 UK	"Baby Phat" (De La Soul featuring Devin The Dude and Yummy): Radio Impact (US) : November 2001; 12" Single (US) : November 6, 2001; CD Single (UK) : February 18, 2002	—	—	81	55	AOI: Bionix

=== Soundtrack appearances ===
Year	Song	Artists	Movie
2010	"Melody"	Gene Noble feat. Yummy Bingham	Gun Hill
2010	"Circles"	Yummy Bingham	King of Paper Chasin
2010	"Major Grind"	Cheese feat. Yummy Bingham	King of Paper Chasin
2005	"I'm Caught Up"	Yummy Bingham	Beauty Shop
2001	"Turn It Out"	De La Soul feat. Yummy Bingham	Osmosis Jones

=== Other appearances ===
Year	Song	Artists	Credits
2025	"Will Be"	De La Soul	Featured artist
2018	"Greaner Grass/Cleaner Water"	Tiron & Ayomari	Co-writer, Featured artist
2018	"Black Business"	Princess Good Good	Co-writer, Vocalist
2017	"All of Us"	Talib Kweli, Jay Electronica	Co-writer, Featured artist
2017	"Heads Up Eyes Open"	Talib Kweli, Rick Ross	Co-writer, Featured artist
2017	"It's Me and You"	Mall G	Co-writer, Featured artist
2016	"Sincerly Yours"	Swerv-O	Featured artist
2016	"Make Me Feel"	RK	Featured artist
2015	"Watch How You Move"	Busta Rhymes, Raekwon	Featured artist
2015	"Deeper Love"	Jayo Cote	Co-writer, Featured artist
2015	"Unnecessary Pain"	Joe Budden, Felicia Temple	Featured artist
2015	"Happy Tears"	John Brackett	Featured artist
2014	"Chosen"	Scoe	Featured artist
2014	"Too Much"	Zendaya	Co-writer
2014	"In a Perfect World"	Ginette Claudette	Co-writer, Background vocalist
2013	"Live To Love You (Remix)"	J Hoard	Featured artist
2013	"Get Right"	EvitaN, Casual	Featured artist
2012	"Reach High"	Kardinal Offishall, Nottz	Featured artist
2012	"Wonder Love"	Wonder Girls	Co-writer
2012	"You Are My Reason"	Miho Fukuhara, AI	Co-writer
2012	"Just Anybody"	Big Brother Biz	Featured vocalist
2012	"Get Out"	Nilo G	Featured vocalist
2012	"Deja"	Nilo G	Featured vocalist
2012	"So Bad"	Cam'ron, Nicki Minaj	Featured vocalist
2011	"All My Love"	Tiron & Ayomari	Featured vocalist
2011	"M.F.G."	Tiron & Ayomari	Background vocalist
2011	"F*** You"	Slim da Mobster	Featured vocalist
2011	"The One"	Gene Noble	Featured vocalist
2011	"Melody"	Gene Noble	Featured vocalist
2011	"Scream"	Jaila Simms	Featured vocalist
2011	"I'm Done"	B.Slade	Featured vocalist
2011	"Don't Wanna Be"	A-Plus	Featured vocalist
2011	"Thought You Had Me"	Monica	Co-writer, Background vocalist
2011	"When I Look At You"	Q.U.E.	Featured vocalist
2011	"More Than I Can Say"	Nas, Keyshia Cole	Co-writer
2011	"Always Love Thy Family"	Busta Rhymes	Featured vocalist
2010	"Go Harder"	Yes Lord	Featured vocalist
2010	"Foot On The Pedal"	T.F. Mafia & MontBangers	Featured vocalist
2010	"The Parking Lot"	Tonex	Background vocalist
2010	"Everything Alright Everything OK"	Chipz Da General	Featured vocalist
2009	"Loving Out The Box"	Judacamp	Featured vocalist
2009	"DreamMaker"	Paula Campbell	Co-writer
2008	"Numba 1 (Tide Is High) Remix"	Kardinal Offishall	Featured vocalist
2008	"Ego Trippin"	Mýa	Co-writer
2008	"High Off You"	Billy Guy	Featured vocalist
2007	"Feels Good"	The Game	Featured vocalist
2007	"I've Changed"	Jaheim, Keyshia Cole,	Background vocalist
2007	"Gangsta Paradise"	Ja Rule	Featured vocalist
2007	"We Got The Street"	Flipmode Squad	Featured vocalist
2007	"Trust"	Sunshine Anderson	Co-writer, Background vocalist
2006	"The Bomb"	Ray Cash	Featured vocalist
2006	"Tell Me"	P. Diddy, Christina Aguilera	Co-writer, Background vocalist
2006	"Making It Hard"	P. Diddy, Mary J. Blige	Co-writer
2006	"Be About Yours"	Keshia Chanté	Co-writer, Background vocalist
2006	"Breathe"	Shayla G	Featured vocalist
2006	"Wonder"	Black Sheep	Featured vocalist
2006	"Hold Me Down"	Merlino	Featured vocalist
2005	"Out On Bail" (Supa Dave West Mix)	Tupac Shakur	Featured vocalist
2005	"Pardon Me"	Salt	Featured vocalist
2005	"Man Up"	Amerie	Co-writer
2005	"Magic"	Crystal Kay	Co-writer, Background vocals
2004	"Appreciate"	Spazzout	Featured vocalist
2004	"Much More"	Lupe Fiasco	Featured vocalist
2004	"Welcome Back Chilly"	Lupe Fiasco	Featured vocalist
2004	"Much More"	De La Soul	Featured vocalist
2004	"No"	De La Soul, Butta Verses	Featured vocalist
2004	"Black Girl Pain"	Talib Kweli	Background vocalist
2004	"Back It Up"	Shawn Kane	Featured vocalist
2004	"My Baby"	Philly's Most Wanted, Ryan Toby	Background vocalist
2004	"Dolo"	Tarralyn Ramsey	Co-writer, Background vocalist
2004	"Unpredictable"	Patti LaBelle	Background vocalist
2004	"Mama Can You Hear Me"	Billy Guy	Background vocalist
2003	"Ghetto Love Song"	Jaron, Tha' Rayne	Featured vocalist
2003	"Doin My Thang"	Jae Millz, Juelz Santana	Featured vocalist
2002	"Juicy"	Next, Tha' Rayne	Featured vocalist
2002	"Fabulous"	Jaheim, Tha' Rayne	Featured vocalist
2002	"Something Wikid"	Midwikid	Background vocalist
2002	"She's a Queen"	Queen Latifah, Tha' Rayne	Featured vocalist
2002	"Ain't A Thang Wrong"	Boyz II Men, Rob Jackson	Background vocalist
2001	"Baby Phat"	De La Soul, Devin The Dude	Featured vocalist
2001	"Special"	De La Soul	Featured vocalist
2001	"Finers Keepers"	Jaheim, Lil' Mo	Background vocalist
2001	"Remarkable"	Jaheim, Terry Dexter	Background vocalist
