= Come to Me (Diddy song) =

2006 single by Sean Combs

Single by P. Diddy featuring Nicole Scherzinger

from the album Press Play
- Released: September 12, 2006
- Studio: Compound (Signal Hill, California); Daddys House (New York City); Chalice B, (Los Angeles, California)
- Genre: Hip-hop
- Length: 4:34 (album version); 4:01 (radio version)
- Label: Bad Boy; Atlantic
- Songwriters: Sean Combs; Mike Winans; Jacoby White; Shay Winans; Nicole Scherzinger; Shannon "Slam" Lawrence; Roger Greene Jr.; Richard Frierson; Yakubu Izuagbe
- Producers: Jai; Younglord; P. Diddy

P. Diddy singles chronology
| "Nasty Girl" (2005) | "Come to Me" (2006) | "Tell Me" (2006) |

Nicole Scherzinger singles chronology
| "You Are My Miracle" (2006) | "Come to Me" (2006) | "Whatever U Like" (2007) |

"Come to Me" is a song by the American rapper and producer P. Diddy from his fourth album, Press Play (2006), featuring guest vocals from Pussycat Dolls lead singer Nicole Scherzinger. The song was written by Combs, Mike Winans, Scherzinger, Jacoby White, Shay Winans, Shannon "Slam" Lawrence, Roger Greene Jr., Richard Frierson and Yakubu Izuagbe with production held by Jai and Younglord.

== History ==
The reggae remix of "Come to Me" was leaked onto radio airwaves by a Syracuse, New York radio station in late September 2006. The remix features Elephant Man. Another remix of this song features the Notorious B.I.G. An official remix has been released featuring Nicole Scherzinger, Yung Joc, T.I. & Young Dro.

Diddy performed "Come To Me" with Cassie on MTV Europe Music Awards 2006, as well as on the NBC pregame show for the opening game of the 2006 NFL season between the Miami Dolphins and the Pittsburgh Steelers at Heinz Field in Pittsburgh, Pennsylvania. He has also performed the song several times with Danity Kane. Plus, he performed it three times with Scherzinger.

== Critical reception ==
The song received mixed reviews from critics. Kate Maidens of Gigwise wasn't impressed of the song calling it a "mediocre, second hand track." Although she did compliment Scherzinger for adding "some cutting edge vocals." Miriam Zendle of Digital Spy awarded the song 3 out 5 stars noted that "although this track is not one of the best we've heard from him, it's still clear that [Diddy has] put effort in with production."

== Chart performance ==
"Come to Me" debuted on the U.S. Billboard Hot 100 at number 93 and peaked at number 9 on its eighth week on the chart. In its second week, "Come to Me" gained high single sales and digital downloads but moderate airplay pushing its position at number 25. Having high single sales across the U.S., "Come to Me" peaked at number 9 on the U.S. Billboard Hot 100 Singles Sales. "Come to Me" has also gained high digital downloads, making it a peak at number 15 on the U.S. Billboard Hot Digital Songs.

== Music video ==
The video for the song premiered on BET's Access Granted on August 8, 2006. It has also peaked at number 13 on the Hot R&B/Hip-Hop Songs chart. The song did chart on BET's 106 & Park, where it reached number 4, and reached number 1 on MTV's Sucker Free. In an interview with MTV News, Diddy said that he tried to seduce Scherzinger. "She's definitely, to me, one of the next female superstars. I thought that she would play a great seductress and somebody that I could chase, too—the cat-and-mouse thing. And [I also thought] that we could dance and have some fun." Diddy also was inspired by British artists such as Mick Jagger as he wanted to emulate that rock-star attitude. "It definitely has a hip-hop, rock-star appeal. I admire all of the rock stars—especially a lot of the British rock stars—for their attitude. Looking at [Jagger] back in the day, and just how the clothes and the attitude were a part of it."

The video begins in a city where a black van pulls up in an unknown alley. Then, the clock shows the time of 4:30 and Diddy is seen with his girlfriend in bed and it turns to face the woman staring at the bed. Then, she heard her cellphone ring and an unknown figure (revealed to be Scherzinger) starts telling her about Diddy showing up. As the music begins, Diddy wakes up and a woman passes the phone to him. Meanwhile, Scherzinger is waiting inside a club where Diddy shows up and does the choreography while making eye contact with her. During the bridge, Diddy and Scherzinger both went upstairs to a dance on battle. After following Diddy in the flash of light, Scherzinger ends up in a maze with Diddy. Then, they see each other and the maze falls apart and the breakdown starts as Diddy and Scherzinger dance in a lighted room. At the end of the video, Scherzinger walks away and also Diddy stops her and both of them stare at each other with Diddy saying, "press play." The video ends with Diddy and Scherzinger staring at each other when a symbol of the press play shows in the middle.

== Track listing ==
CD single

1. "Come to Me" (radio version) (featuring Nicole Scherzinger) - 4:01
2. "Come to Me" (clean) (featuring Nicole Scherzinger) - 4:34
3. "Come to Me" (dirty) (featuring Nicole Scherzinger) - 4:34
4. "Come to Me" (instrumental version) - 4:33
5. "Come to Me" (call out hook) - 0:14

== Credits and personnel ==
Credits are adapted from the liner notes of Press Play.

Recording

- Recorded at Compound Studio (Signal Hill, California); Daddys House Recording Studios, (New York City); Chalice Studio B, (Los Angeles, California)
- Mixed at Sony Studios (New York City)

Personnel

- Victor Abijaoudi – recording
- JD Andrew – recording
- Devon "Play" Barber – recording
- Cornell "Nell" Brown – assistant recording
- Sean "Diddy" Combs – songwriter, producer, lead vocals
- Iyanna Dean – background vocals
- Richard "Younglord" Frierson – songwriter, producer
- Roger Greene Jr. – songwriter
- Yakubu Izuagbe – songwriter
- Shannon "Slam" Lawrence – songwriter
- Rob Lewis – vocal producer
- Nicole Scherzinger – songwriter, lead vocals
- Pat Viala – mixer
- Jacoby White – songwriter
- Mario Winans – additional music
- Mike Winans – songwriter, vocal producer
- Shay Winans – songwriter, background vocals
- D. Woods – intro vocals

== Charts ==
=== Weekly charts ===
| Chart (2006–2007) | Peak position |
|---|---|
| Australia (ARIA) | 11 |
| Australian Urban (ARIA) | 3 |
| Austria (Ö3 Austria Top 40) | 8 |
| Belgium (Ultratop 50 Flanders) | 25 |
| Belgium (Ultratop 50 Wallonia) | 9 |
| Canada CHR/Top 40 (Billboard) | 29 |
| Denmark (Tracklisten) | 3 |
| Europe (Eurochart Hot 100) | 3 |
| Finland (Suomen virallinen lista) | 7 |
| France (SNEP) | 15 |
| Germany (GfK) | 6 |
| Hungary (Editors' Choice Top 40) | 16 |
| Ireland (IRMA) | 3 |
| Italy (FIMI) | 17 |
| Lithuania (EHR) | 2 |
| Netherlands (Dutch Top 40 Tipparade) | 8 |
| Netherlands (Single Top 100) | 45 |
| New Zealand (Recorded Music NZ) | 25 |
| Romania (Romanian Top 100) | 23 |
| Scottish Singles Sales (Official Charts) | 5 |
| Slovakia Airplay (ČNS IFPI) | 29 |
| Sweden (Sverigetopplistan) | 44 |
| Switzerland (Schweizer Hitparade) | 3 |
| UK Singles (Official Charts) | 4 |
| UK Hip Hop/R&B (Official Charts) | 1 |
| US Billboard Hot 100 | 9 |
| US Hot R&B/Hip-Hop Songs (Billboard) | 13 |
| US Hot Rap Songs (Billboard) | 3 |
| US Pop Airplay (Billboard) | 21 |
| US Rhythmic Airplay (Billboard) | 9 |

=== Year-end charts ===
| Chart (2006) | Position |
|---|---|
| Australia (ARIA) | 92 |
| Australian Urban (ARIA) | 35 |
| Belgium (Ultratop 50 Wallonia) | 70 |
| Europe (Eurochart Hot 100) | 43 |
| Germany (Media Control GfK) | 71 |
| Switzerland (Schweizer Hitparade) | 57 |
| UK Singles (OCC) | 76 |
| UK Urban (Music Week) | 9 |
| US Hot R&B/Hip-Hop Songs (Billboard) | 75 |

== Certifications ==
| Region | Certification | Certified units/sales |
|---|---|---|
| Germany (BVMI) | Gold | 150,000^{^} |
| United Kingdom (BPI) | Silver | 200,000^{‡} |
^{^} Shipments figures based on certification alone.^{‡} Sales+streaming figures based on certification alone.

== Release history ==
| Region | Date | Format(s) | Label(s) | Ref. |
|---|---|---|---|---|
| United States | September 12, 2006 | Digital download | Bad Boy Entertainment; Atlantic | |
| United Kingdom | October 2, 2006 | CD | Bad Boy Entertainment; Atlantic | |
| Australia | October 9, 2006 | CD | Bad Boy Entertainment | |
