= Bad Girl (Danity Kane song) =

Single by Danity Kane featuring Missy Elliott

from the album Welcome to the Dollhouse
- B-side: "Damaged"
- Released: July 1, 2008
- Studio: Circle House Recording Studios (Miami, Florida)
- Length: 4:03 (album version)
- Label: Bad Boy; Atlantic
- Songwriters: Mary Brown; James Washington; Devin "DLP" Parker; Nathanial Hill; Missy Elliott
- Producer: Danja

Danity Kane singles chronology
"Damaged" (2008)	"Bad Girl" (2008)	"Lemonade" (2014)

Missy Elliott singles chronology
"Need U Bad" (2008)	"Bad Girl" (2008)	"Whatcha Think About That" (2008)

Music video
- "Bad Girl" on YouTube

"Bad Girl" is a song recorded by American girl group Danity Kane. It was written by Mary Brown, Jim Beanz, Devin "DLP" Parker, Danja and Missy Elliott. Produced by Danja and featuring guest vocals by Elliott, the song was released by Bad Boy Records on July 1, 2008 as the second and final single from the band's second studio album, Welcome to the Dollhouse (2008). It peaked at number 85 on the US Billboard Pop 100, marking the last release from the group before their early 2009 breakup.

== Background ==
The recording process of "Bad Girl" was featured on the second season of the MTV reality television show, Making the Band 4. They received the track only after revealing their dissatisfaction with the direction of their album to Diddy (their executive producer).

After recording three songs, including the downtempo songs "Is Anybody Listening" and "Poetry", the group feared that the songs revealed a trend that indicated Diddy's and the record label's concept for their new album. These opinions were first voiced during a studio session with Jim Beanz, Aundrea Fimbres stating they wanted a "pop-international [album]". Next, Aubrey O'Day represented the band's opinions in a conversation with their A&R, Conrad Dimanche. "Conrad, please just understand when I say this ... [last album] was more about learning and growing. And now, we found ourselves. So this album, to us, has to feel like we found ourselves, and we don't feel that yet." He tried to explain to her that the team's goal was "to have an incredible album", the same as Danity Kane's, but O'Day rebutted. She continued, stating the songs so far recorded consisted of "these 'I Want You Back', 'I Miss You', 'I Need You' [songs]," but clarified herself, adding, "I'm not saying there can't be those moments where we're vulnerable." She concluded, "We are strong women ... and we need to be able to sing that."

Dissatisfaction continued to be expressed as the girls received prospective tracks, with Dawn Richard commenting, "They just don't match us!" The group's unhappy comments reached a new level during a visit with their then label-mates, Day26, in the studio. While listening to their tracks "Are We in This Together" and "I'm the Reason", O'Day made the startling comment, "It's catchy. You know? It's like ... It's got energy. All of our tracks, I wanna slit my fucking throat ... I am so happy that people love you enough to give you good tracks."

After the numerous complaints, Diddy arranged a meeting with the band at Circle House Recording Studios. Getting over her initial nerves, O'Day relayed the same message to Diddy as she had to Dimanche. D. Woods helped convey this message, adding that they wanted to "understand [his] vision" and that they "had a different idea" and thought "[he] did too", going in a more uptempo direction. Diddy defended his stances on the issue, stating, "If I feel something, then I at least want to hear your texture on it. That's the play that I'm calling. Go run the play!" O'Day countered, continuing that the process of making the album was "personal" and that he would best understand this, him being a recording artist in his own right. She followed that the group understood that they would not love everything that they ever did and it would be a "compromise", but none of them have finished a track, wanting to perform it forever as part of their career.

Surprisingly, Diddy apologized for the lack of communication and started taking Danity Kane's opinion into account while creating the album. Days later, they received the uptempo track that would become "Bad Girl".

== Chart performance ==
"Bad Girl" failed to reprise the commercial success of previous single "Damaged." It reached number 85 on the US Billboard Pop 100 chart, but failed to enter the Billboard Hot 100, instead reaching number ten on the Bubbling Under Hot 100 chart.

== Music video ==
The music video for "Bad Girl" was shot late June to early July 2008 in Los Angeles, California and premiered on the MTV programming block FNMTV Premieres on July 25. It was directed by Erik White and choreographed by Gil Duldulao. The video also includes cameos by featured rapper Missy Elliott, Day26 member Qwanell Mosley, and Talan Torriero of the hit MTV reality series Laguna Beach: The Real Orange County. It also reached the top position of the Billboard Hot Videoclip Tracks chart in 2008.

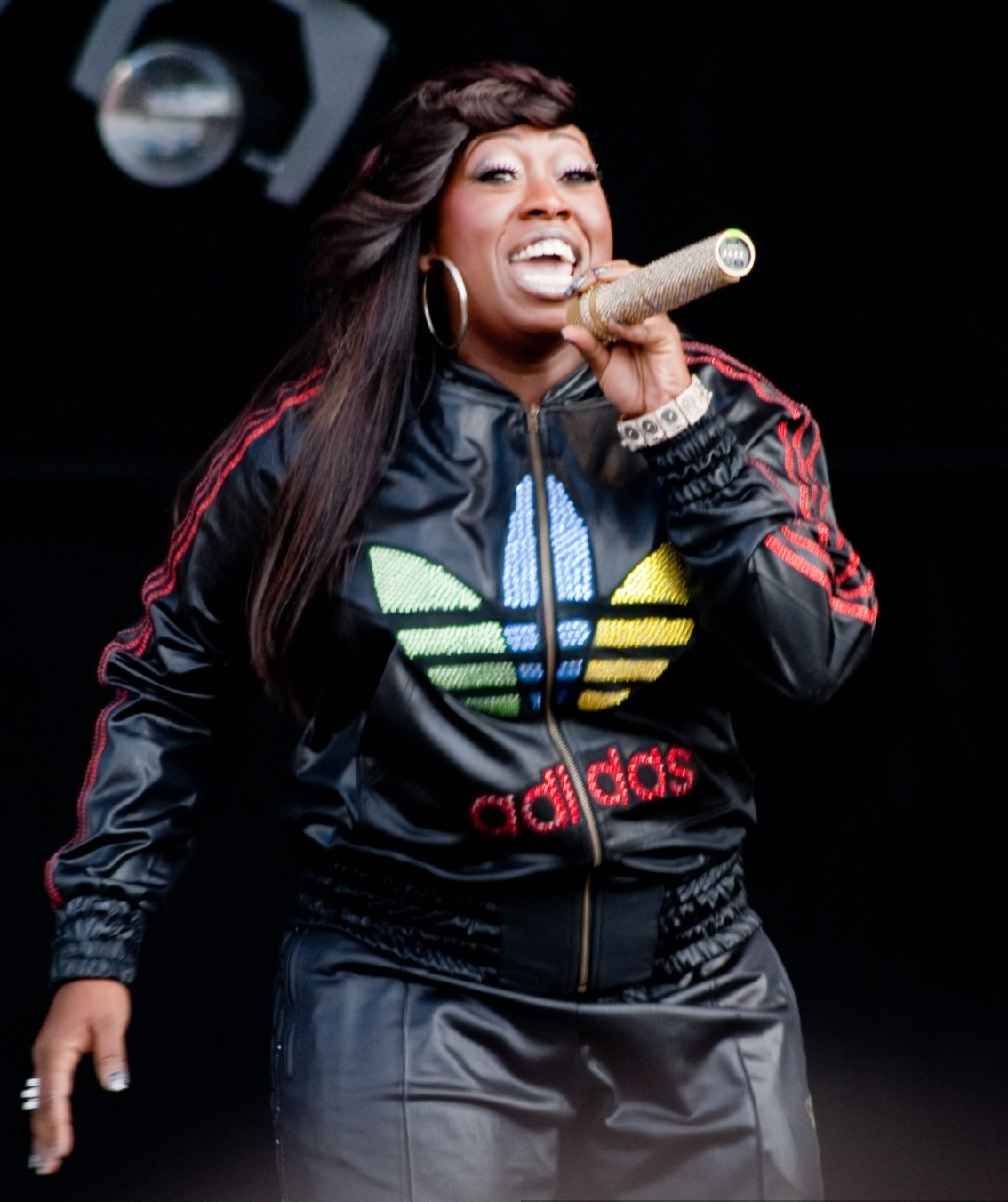
Missy Elliott appears in the video for "Bad Girl."

The concept of the video is a graphic novel and stays true to the famous lyric in the song, "When the red light comes on, I transform," as each group member transforms into an alter ego of theirs after a flash of red light. In the first verse and the first chorus, Aubrey O'Day portrays a con trying to claim her innocence during interrogation with a detective (played by Torriero). After a flash of red light, "The Sweet Aubrey" transforms. Now wearing a tight leather catsuit, she throws him on the table, straddles him, and handcuffs him to her chair. She leans in for a kiss before making her escape. D. Woods portrays a peep show performer enchanting her suitor. After a flash of red light, Woods now in all leather, grabs him and drags him into the peep show window. The impact knocks him out, leaving her to take all of his money.

During the second verse through the rap break, Dawn Richard portrays a damsel in distress strapped to an upright gurney in "Dr. Q's Secret Laboratory". Dr. Q (played by Mosley) examines, licks, and bites her while taking observations of her in a lustful manner. Time is about to run out for "The Lovely Dawn" when a flash of red light appears. Suddenly, she changes wardrobe, breaks free, grabs the doctor and slams him on the gurney, returning his lusty looks. Aundrea Fimbres portrays a hostage imprisoned in a dark basement, who is chained up and planning her escape. Her muscular captor looks over her with a metal pipe in his hands, contemplating his next move. After a flash of red light, "The Ravishing Aundrea" breaks free of the chains and knocks out her kidnapper. Meanwhile, Missy Elliott is seen beside a machine rapping the 2nd verse the same place where Dawn and Aundrea escapes.

In the bridge section of the song till the last chorus, Shannon Bex portrays a biker babe being chased through "Gotham City" on her motorbike by a male biker. He blows a kiss to her, showing his intentions. After a flash of red light, Bex transforms and kicks him in his face, knocking him off his motorbike. Intermixed between these shots are all of the alter egos of Danity Kane, engaging in hard-hitting choreography, sometimes joined by "The Mighty Missy Elliott". The video ends with the "DK" logo transforming into a starry sky.

== Track listing ==
The following listings were taken from the single's sellsheet, the Billboard track listing and its listing at Amazon.com.

CD single
No.	Title	Length
1.	"Bad Girl" (featuring Missy Elliott) (radio version)	3:25
2.	"Bad Girl" (featuring Missy Elliott) (album version)	4:03
3.	"Bad Girl" (no rap version)	3:22
4.	"Bad Girl" (instrumental)	4:03

12" single
No.	Title	Length
1.	"Bad Girl" (featuring Missy Elliott) (album version)	3:25
2.	"Bad Girl" (instrumental)	4:03
3.	"Bad Girl" (a capella)	3:22
4.	"Damaged" (album version)	4:06
5.	"Damaged" (instrumental)	4:06
6.	"Damaged" (a capella)	3:33

== Credits ==
According to the Welcome to the Dollhouse liner notes.

A-side "Bad Girl"

- Recorded at Circle House Recording Studios in Miami, Florida. Additional recording took place at Daddy's House Recording Studios in New York City, New York and Goldmind Studios in New Jersey.
- Production – Danja
- Songwriters – Mary Brown, James Washington, Devin "DLP" Parker, Nathanial Hill, Missy Elliott
- Audio mixing – Marcella Araica of The Hit Factory Criteria Studios in Miami, Florida
- Engineered – KOIL, Andy Geel, Paul J. Falcone
- Vocal production and arrangement – Mary Brown
- Background vocals – Mary Brown
- Mastering – Brian Gardner

B-side – "Damaged"

- Recorded at Circle House Recording Studios in Miami, Florida. Additional recording took place at Daddy's House Recording Studios in New York City, New York.
- Production – The Stereotypes; Sean Combs and Mario Winans (additional)
- Songwriters – Jonathan Yip, Jeremy Reeves, Micayle McKinney, Ray Romulos, Shannon "Slam" Lawrence, Rose Marie Tan, James Smith, Justin Walker, Sean Combs, Mario Winans
- Audio mixing – Ken Lewis of Daddy's House Recording Studios in New York City, New York
- Audio mixing assistant – Steve "Rockstar" Dickey
- Engineered – KOIL, Kevin "Kev-O" Wilson, Steve "Rockstar" Dickey
- Mastering – Brian Gardner

== Charts ==
Weekly chart performance for "Bad Girl"
Chart (2008)	Peak position
US Bubbling Under Hot 100 (Billboard)	10
US Pop 100 (Billboard)	85

== Release history ==
Release dates and formats for "Bad Girl"
Region	Date	Format(s)	Label(s)	Ref(s).
United States	July 1, 2008	Digital download	Bad Boy; Atlantic	
United States	July 15, 2008	12" maxi single	Bad Boy; Atlantic	
Germany	July 14, 2008	12" maxi single	Bad Boy; Atlantic	
