= Still Ghetto =

Studio album by Jaheim
- Released: November 5, 2002
- Recorded: 2001–2002
- Genre: R&B
- Label: Divine Mill; Warner Bros.

Jaheim chronology
Ghetto Love (2001)	Still Ghetto (2002)	Ghetto Classics (2006)

Singles from Still Ghetto
- 1. "Fabulous" Released: October 15, 2002; 2. "Put That Woman First" Released: February 9, 2003; 3. "Backtight" Released: April 20, 2003; 4. "Diamond in da Ruff" Released: September 15, 2003

Still Ghetto is the second studio album by American R&B singer Jaheim. It was released by Divine Mill Records and Warner Bros. Records on November 5, 2002, in the United States. Released to favorable reviews, it debuted at number eight on the US Billboard 200 and number three on the Billboard Top R&B/Hip-Hop Albums, with first-week sales of 111,000 copies, eventually reaching platinum for selling a million domestic copies.

The album spawned the hit single "Fabulous" featuring Tha' Rayne as well as the single "Put That Woman First" which entered the top 20 of the US Billboard Hot 100, reaching number 20. The track, "Everywhere I Am" is dedicated to the memory of the singer's parents, who died before he rose to fame.

"Every Which Way" featuring Duganz was removed from the clean version of the album.

== Critical reception ==
Professional ratings
Review scores
Source	Rating
AllMusic	4/5 stars
Blender	3/5 stars
Entertainment Weekly	B−
Uncut	4/5 stars
USA Today	3.5/4 stars
Vibe	4/5 stars

AllMusic editor John Bush found that "Jaheim's considerable vocal talents only increased during the recording of his second album, and a stronger set of songs made Still Ghetto a definite improvement over the debut [...] For "Everywhere I Am," Jaheim recorded a postcard to his mother, who died before he gained fame; it's another testament to his power as an artist that Still Ghetto never descends into maudlin sentiments. Just like his soul forefathers, everything about Jaheim is honest and heartfelt." Daryl Easlea from BBC Music called Still Ghetto "an absolute pearl, a perfect encapsulation of the state of R&B/hip hop in the early 00s." USA Today critic Steve Jones wrote that Still Ghetto combined Jaheim's "rugged vocal style" reminiscent of old-school soul with "edgy street sensibilities" drawn from hip-hop, delivering a "frank approach" to love whether he was trying to hold a relationship together or start a new one, with highlights like "Beauty and Thug" featuring Mary J. Blige. He concluded that while the game may remain the same, "Jaheim keeps getting better at it."

== Chart performance ==
In the United States, Still Ghetto debuted at number eight on the US Billboard 200 and number three on the Top R&B/Hip-Hop Albums, with first-week sales of 111,000 copies. It was certified platinum by the Recording Industry Association of America (RIAA) for selling a million domestic copies.

== Track listing ==
=== Explicit version track listing ===
No.	Title	Writer(s)	Producer(s)	Length
1.	"Introduction" (featuring Duganz)	Daquan Youngblood; Darren Lighty; Edward Ferrell; Jaheim Hoagland; Keir Gist	D. Lighty; Eddie F; KayGee	1:48
2.	"Diamond in da Ruff"	Albert Hamilton; Balewa Muhammad; Clifton Lighty; Ernest Wilson; Gist; Vernon Brown	KayGee; No I.D.; Xtreme	3:21
3.	"Fabulous" (featuring Tha' Rayne)	Muhammad; Eddie Berkeley; Gene McFadden; John Whitehead; Gist; Mary Brown; Victor Carstarphen	Berkeley; KayGee	3:47
4.	"Let's Talk About It"	Muhammad; Bessie Banks; Charles Amorelli; C. Lighty; Frank Green; Herman Kelly; Hoagland; Nat Robinson	Giz; Calogero	4:02
5.	"Put That Woman First"	Muhammad; Booker T. Jones; C. Lighty; Dinky Bingham; Hoagland; Gist; Brown; William Bell	Bingham; KayGee	4:05
6.	"Beauty and the Thug" (featuring Mary J. Blige)	Artell Vanderveer; Malik Pendleton	Pendleton	4:57
7.	"Me And My Bitch"	Eric Williams; Wesley Hogges	Williams; Hogges	3:19
8.	"Backtight"	Williams; McFadden; Hoagland; John Drakesford; Whitehead; Kenneth Gamble; Larry Singletary; Carstarphen; Hogges	Williams; Hogges	3:45
9.	"Special Day"	Pendleton	Pendleton	4:42
10.	"Long as I Live"	Muhammad; C. Lighty; D. Lighty; Delvis Damon; Ferrell; Hoagland	Eddie F.; D. Lighty	4:45
11.	"Interlude"	Ferrell; D. Lighty	Eddie F.; D. Lighty	0:48
12.	"Everywhere I Am"	D. Lighty; Ferrell; Sylvester Jordan Jr.	Eddie F.; D. Lighty	5:17
13.	"Tight Jeans"	Muhammad; C. Lighty; D. Lighty; Ferrell; Jordan	Eddie F.; D. Lighty	4:35
14.	"Whut You Want"	C. Lighty; Hoagland; Kiyamma Griffin	Drummer & DJ	1:42
15.	"Every Which Way" (featuring Duganz)	Youngblood; Williams; Hoagland; Drakesford; Hogges	Williams; Hogges	3:47
16.	"Still Ghetto" (featuring Taquane)	C. Lighty; Hoagland; Marilyn McLeod; Pam Sawyer; T. Oliveira; Hoagland	T.O.	4:09

=== Clean version track listing ===
No.	Title	Writer(s)	Producer(s)	Length
1.	"Introduction" (featuring Duganz)	Daquan Youngblood; Darren Lighty; Eddie F; Edward Ferrell; Jaheim Hoagland; Keir Gist	D. Lighty; Eddie F; KayGee	1:48
2.	"Diamond in da Ruff"	Albert Hamilton; Balewa Muhammad; Clifton Lighty; No I.D.; Ernest Wilson; Gist; Vernon Brown	KayGee; No I.D.; Xtreme	3:21
3.	"Fabulous" (featuring Tha' Rayne)	Muhammad; Eddie Berkeley; Gene McFadden; John Whitehead; Gist; Mary Brown; Victor Carstarphen	Berkeley; KayGee	3:47
4.	"Let's Talk About It"	Muhammad; Bessie Banks; Charles Amorelli; C. Lighty; Frank Green; Herman Kelly; Hoagland; Nat Robinson	Giz; Calogero	4:02
5.	"Put That Woman First"	Muhammad; Booker T. Jones; C. Lighty; Dinky Bingham; Hoagland; Gist; Brown; William Bell	Bingham; KayGee	4:05
6.	"Beauty and the Thug" (featuring Mary J. Blige)	Artell Vanderveer; Malik Pendleton	Pendleton	4:57
7.	"Me And My Bitch"	Eric Williams; Wesley Hogges	Williams; Hogges	3:19
8.	"Backtight"	Williams; McFadden; Hoagland; John Drakesford; Whitehead; Kenneth Gamble; Larry Singletary; Carstarphen; Hogges	Williams; Hogges	3:45
9.	"Special Day"	Pendleton	Pendleton	4:42
10.	"Long as I Live"	Muhammad; C. Lighty; D. Lighty; Delvis Damon; Ferrell; Hoagland	Eddie F.; D. Lighty	4:45
11.	"Interlude"	Ferrell; D. Lighty	Eddie F.; D. Lighty	0:48
12.	"Everywhere I Am"	D. Lighty; Ferrell; Sylvester Jordan Jr.	Eddie F.; D. Lighty	5:17
13.	"Tight Jeans"	Muhammad; C. Lighty; D. Lighty; Ferrell; Jordan	Eddie F.; D. Lighty	4:35
14.	"Whut You Want"	C. Lighty; Hoagland; Kiyamma Griffin	Drummer & DJ	1:42
15.	"Still Ghetto" (featuring Taquane)	C. Lighty; Hoagland; Marilyn McLeod; Pam Sawyer; T. Oliveira; Hoagland	T.O.	4:09

Sample credits

- "Fabulous" contains replayed elements from "Wake Up Everybody" as performed by Harold Melvin & the Blue Notes.
- "Let's Talk About It" contains elements from "Try to Leave Me If You Can But I Bet You Can't Do It" as performed by Bessie Banks.
- "Put That Woman First" contains replayed elements from "I Forgot to Be Your Lover" as performed by William Bell.
- "Backtight" contains elements from "Somebody Told Me" as performed by Teddy Pendergrass.
- "Still Ghetto" contains elements from "I'd Find You Anywhere" as performed by Creative Source.

== Charts ==
=== Weekly charts ===
Chart (2002)	Peak position
US Billboard 200	8
US Top R&B/Hip-Hop Albums (Billboard)	3

=== Year-end charts ===
Chart (2003)	Position
US Billboard 200	73
US Top R&B/Hip-Hop Albums (Billboard)	9

== Certifications ==
Region	Certification	Certified units/sales
United States (RIAA)	Platinum	1,000,000^{^}
^{^} Shipments figures based on certification alone.
