= Finally Made Me Happy =

Single by Macy Gray featuring Natalie Cole

from the album Big
- Released: February 20, 2007 (US); April 16, 2007 (UK)
- Recorded: 2006
- Genre: Soul, jazz
- Length: 3:09 (radio edit); 4:02 (album version)
- Label: Geffen
- Songwriters: Macy Gray, Teedra Moses, Cassandra O'Neil, Justin Meldal-Johnsen, Victor Indrizzo
- Producers: Macy Gray, will.i.am, Ron Fair

Macy Gray singles chronology
"Love Is Gonna Get You" (2004)	"Finally Made Me Happy" (2007)	"Shoo Be Doo" (2007)

"Finally Made Me Happy" is the lead single from Macy Gray's fourth studio album, Big (2007). It features additional vocals from Natalie Cole. It was made available on iTunes for the week of March 18–24, 2007 and sold over 7,000 downloads. Gray performed the song on the Late Show with David Letterman on March 27, 2007 and on The View on March 28, 2007.

The single was released on April 15, 2007 in the United Kingdom. Soon after, the video became the number-one most played video on television channel The Box and was added to the Capital FM and BBC Radio 2 radio playlists (it was playlisted on the C-list of the latter). "Finally Made Me Happy" failed to make the charts, but nevertheless reached the top twenty of the UK club chart, peaking at number eighteen.

== Music video ==
The music video, directed by Meiert Avis, primarily features Gray performing the song with her band, which features will.i.am on the piano. Towards the end of the song, Cole enters the video ad-libbing and singing joyfully with Gray.

The video is similar to that for Prince's 1984 "When Doves Cry". Gray recreates the scenes with the bathtub and singing with the band. Cole comes down the spiral staircases in the same way Prince did in the "When Doves Cry" video.

== Track listing ==
CD single

1. "Finally Made Me Happy" (featuring Natalie Cole)
2. "Me with You"
