= Jamaica Boys =

US musical group

- Origin: Queens
- Genres: R&B, New jack swing
- Years active: 1986 - 1991
- Labels: Warner Bros. Records
- Past members: Marcus Miller; Spaceman Patterson; Lenny White; Bernard Wright; Dinky Bingham; Mark Stevens; Eric "CoDee" Cody

The Jamaica Boys was an American, Queens-based, funk trio, that existed in the late 1980s. Group member Mark Stevens was the brother of Chaka Khan, and also toured with her as a backup singer.

One of their members, Marcus Miller, was Luther Vandross's writing partner on several of the latter's hits. Lenny White is the legendary drummer in Chick Corea's Return To Forever band and recordings.

== Members ==
- Mark Stevens — lead vocals
- Dinky Bingham (who replaced Mark Stevens) – lead vocals, keyboards
- Marcus Miller — bass, backing vocals, guitars, keyboards
- Lenny White — drums, backing vocals, percussion
- Bernard Wright — keyboards, backing vocals
- Spaceman Patterson — guitars
- Eric "CoDee" Cody

== Singles ==
- Shake It Up! (1990)
- Pick Up The Phone! (1990)
- (It's That) Lovin' Feeling (1987)
- Spend Some Time With Me (1988)

== Discography ==
- Jamaica Boys, Warner Bros. Records, 1987
- J Boys, Warner Bros. Records, 1990
