= Shoo Be Doo =

Single by Macy Gray

from the album Big
- Released: March 2007 (US)
- Recorded: 2006
- Genre: Soul, jazz
- Length: 4:04
- Label: Geffen
- Songwriter(s): Macy Gray, Jared Lee Gosselin, Philip White, Justin Meldal-Johnsen, Printz Board, Mary Brown, Jessica Silson
- Producer(s): Jared Lee Gosselin, Philip White, Ron Fair

Macy Gray singles chronology
"Finally Made Me Happy" (2007)	"Shoo Be Doo" (2007)	"What I Gotta Do" (2007)

Audio
- "Shoo Be Doo" on YouTube

"Shoo Be Doo" is the second single from Macy Gray's fourth studio album, Big (2007). The song became the number-one most added track at urban AC radio in late March 2007. It peaked at number fifty-five on the US Billboard Hot R&B/Hip-Hop Songs and number eleven on the Hot Adult R&B Airplay chart.

== Charts ==
Chart (2007)	Peak position
US Billboard Hot R&B/Hip-Hop Songs	55
