= Big (album) =

Studio album by Macy Gray
- Released: March 21, 2007
- Recorded: 2006
- Genre: R&B; soul; neo soul
- Length: 43:47
- Label: will.i.am; Geffen
- Producer: Damon Elliott; Ron Fair (also exec.); Jared Gosselin; Macy Gray (also exec.); Noiztrip; Justin Timberlake; Phillip White; will.i.am (also exec.)

Macy Gray chronology
Live in Las Vegas (2005)	Big (2007)	The Sellout (2010)

Singles from Big
- 1. "Finally Made Me Happy" Released: February 20, 2007; 2. "Shoo Be Doo" Released: March 2007; 3. "What I Gotta Do" Released: June 26, 2007

Big is the fourth studio album by American singer-songwriter Macy Gray. It was released on March 21, 2007, by Geffen Records. It is Gray's first studio album in four years. The album debuted at number 39 on the US Billboard 200, selling 23,000 copies in its first week.

Three singles were released from the album: "Finally Made Me Happy" (a collaboration with Natalie Cole), "Shoo Be Doo", and "What I Gotta Do". The latter was included on the Shrek the Third soundtrack. Music from this album was also featured in the I Love New York season one reunion. The album's cover art was widely illustrated on iPhone ads and featured on the first boxes of the iPod Touch.

== Critical reception ==
Professional ratings
Aggregate scores
Source	Rating
Metacritic	62/100
Review scores
Source	Rating
AllMusic	3.5/5 stars
Blender	3/5 stars
Digital Spy	2/5 stars
Entertainment Weekly	B−
The Guardian	3/5 stars
Los Angeles Times	3/4 stars
PopMatters	5/10
Rolling Stone	2.5/5 stars
Slant Magazine	3/5 stars
Yahoo! Music	8/10 stars

Big received generally favourable reviews from music critics. At Metacritic, which assigns a normalized rating out of 100 to reviews from mainstream critics, the album received an average score of 62, based on 17 reviews.

Shane Harrison of the Atlanta Journal Constitution, with an A− called the album, "One of the year's most inspired pairings between producer and artist." Dan Gennoe of Yahoo! Music called Gray's Big "the worthy follow-up to her On How Life Is debut," praising the contributions from the guest artists and the restraint of her signature musical persona. He added that the lack of radio hits on the record may prevent Gray's career from rebounding, but said that "Whatever the commercial outcome though, no one can say that this is anything other than a supreme return to form." John Bush of AllMusic noted how the quiet storm production from will.i.am made Big "the slickest album of Gray's career," but said that it brings into better focus the vocal quirks of her personality throughout the track listing, concluding that "It'll be interesting to see if past Macy Gray fans are willing to follow her into adult contemporary territory, while those who might like the new direction will be able to alter their perceptions of her." Jon Dolan, writing for Blender, said that Gray's "confessional blues-rasp" is better utilized on more mature tracks like the Fergie collaboration "Glad You're Here", saying that "It's 'licious, but in a classy way."

Rob Brunner of Entertainment Weekly highlighted "Shoo Be Doo", "What I Gotta Do" and "Okay" as great showcases for Gray's "fascinating cracks and warbles" but said that, "Much of Big is either boring or forced, as when Gray launches into "You Spin Me Round (Like a Record)" for no discernible reason." Slant Magazine's Sal Cinquemani felt that Gray's vocals were lacking compared to the featured artists surrounding the album, saying that "she struggles to reach and sustain notes that should be comfortably within her range." Mike Joseph of PopMatters gave feint praise by calling it "a perfectly serviceable adult-soul album", saying that the upbeat tracks capture Macy's old personality better than the ballads. He added that, "While Big shows flashes of the irrepressible spirit that made Macy's first two albums fun to listen to, there are many more instances of uninspired, boring music designed to capture a middle-of-the-road audience."

== Track listing ==
No.	Title	Writer(s)	Producer(s)	Length
1.	"Finally Made Me Happy" (featuring Natalie Cole)	Natalie Hinds; Teedra Moses; Cassandra O'Neil; Justin Meldal-Johnsen; Victor Indrizzo	Macy Gray; will.i.am; Ron Fair	4:02
2.	"Shoo Be Doo"	Hinds; Jared Gosselin; Phillip White; Meldal-Johnsen; Printz Board; Mary Brown; Jessyca Wilson	Gosselin; White; Fair	4:04
3.	"What I Gotta Do"	Hinds; Caleb Speir; Jeremy Ruzumna; Josh Lopez; Jason Villaroman	Gosselin; White; Fair	3:08
4.	"Okay"	Hinds; Will Adams; Justin Timberlake; Speir	will.i.am; Timberlake	4:09
5.	"Glad You're Here" (featuring Fergie)	Hinds; Joe Solo; O'Neil; Meldal-Johnsen; Trevor Lawrence	will.i.am; Fair	2:54
6.	"Ghetto Love"	Hinds; Adams; Moses; Mike Shapiro; James Brown; Betty Jean Newsome	will.i.am	3:08
7.	"One for Me"	Hinds; Meldal-Johnsen; Steve Smith; Mike Farrell; Johnny Mercer	will.i.am; Fair	4:09
8.	"Strange Behavior"	Hinds; Farrell; Speir; Shapiro	Gray; will.i.am	3:35
9.	"Slowly"	Hinds; Gosselin; White; Meldal-Johnsen; George Pajon Jr.	Fair	3:54
10.	"Get Out" (featuring Justin Timberlake)	Hinds; Timberlake; Speir; Shapiro; Allen Toussaint	Timberlake; will.i.am	4:01
11.	"Treat Me Like Your Money" (featuring will.i.am)	Hinds; Meldal-Johnsen; Jean Baptiste; Anthony Tidd; Michael Matthews; Melvin J. Lewis; Adams; Pete Burns; Steve Coy; Mike Percy; Tim Lever; Joseph Simmons; Larry Smith; Darryl McDaniels	will.i.am; Noiztrip	3:27
12.	"Everybody"	Hinds; Board; Pajon; Tim "Izo" Orindgreff	will.i.am	3:16

International bonus tracks
No.	Title	Writer(s)	Producer(s)	Length
13.	"AEIOU"	Gray; Moses; O'Neil; Meldal-Johnsen	Damon Elliott	3:15
14.	"Breakdown" (featuring Romika) (UK and Japan only)	Gray; Gosselin; White; Speir; Josh Lopez	Gosselin; White	3:36
15.	"Me with You" (Japan only)	Gray; Meldal-Johnsen; Farrell; Kiilu Beckwith		4:01

iTunes Store bonus track
No.	Title	Length
13.	"So Much"	3:23

Sample credits

- "Ghetto Love" contains a sample of "It's a Man's Man's Man's World" by James Brown.
- "One for Me" contains a sample of "Dream" by Frank Sinatra.
- "Get Out" contains an interpolation of "Get Out of My Life, Woman" written by Allen Toussaint.
- "Treat Me Like Your Money" contains a sample of "You Spin Me Round (Like a Record)" by Dead or Alive and "It's Like That" by Run–D.M.C.

== Personnel ==
Credits adapted from the liner notes of Big.

- Macy Gray – vocals (all tracks); production (tracks 1, 8); backing vocals (tracks 4, 10); executive production
- Jay Anderson – backing vocals (track 6)
- Davis Barnett – viola (track 4)
- Dawn Beckman – backing vocals (tracks 2, 6, 7, 11, 12)
- Giuliano Bekor – photography
- Printz Board – trumpet (tracks 1, 8); keyboards (tracks 2, 5, 11, 12); Rhodes (track 12)
- Jeff Chestek – string recording (track 4)
- Natalie Cole – additional vocals (track 1)
- "Angry" Mike Eleopoulos – recording engineering (tracks 1–3, 5, 9)
- Scott Elgin – engineering assistance (track 3)
- Ron Fair – production, string arrangements, string conducting (tracks 1–3, 5, 7, 9); Pro Tools, recording engineering (tracks 1–3, 5, 7, 9, 12); piano solo (track 2); additional piano, Wurlitzer (track 3); organ (tracks 3, 5); piano (track 5); harmonica (track 9); executive production
- Mike Farrell – keyboards (tracks 7, 8)
- Fergie – additional vocals (track 5)
- Ghislaine Fleischmann – violin (track 4)
- Paloma Ford – backing vocals (tracks 6, 8, 9)
- Nick Fournier – engineering assistance (tracks 1, 5, 11, 12)
- Brian "Big Bass" Gardner – mastering
- Larry Gold – string arrangements (track 4)
- Jared Gosselin – production (tracks 2, 3); programming (track 3)
- Gravillis Inc. – art direction, design
- Jeremy Gregory – backing vocals, vocal arrangement (track 3)
- Bernie Grundman – mastering
- Keith Harris – percussion (track 2); drums (tracks 2, 4, 7, 12); Rhodes (track 5); keyboards (tracks 7, 11); piano (track 12)
- Tal Herzberg – recording engineering (tracks 1–3, 5, 9, 12); Pro Tools (tracks 1–3, 5, 6, 8–10, 12)
- Victor Indrizzo – drums (tracks 1, 3, 5, 11)
- Tim Izo – saxophone (tracks 1, 12); flute (track 5); clarinet (track 7)
- Eric Jackson – guitar (track 2)
- Jaycen Joshua – mixing engineeringassistance (track 2)
- Gloria Justen – violin (track 4)
- Ryan Kennedy – mixing engineering assistance (tracks 8, 10)
- Padraic Kerin – recording engineering (track 4)
- Sarah Killion – mixing engineering assistance (track 6)
- Emma Kummrow – violin (track 4)
- Mike Lett – backing vocals (track 3)
- Josh Lopez – guitar (track 3)
- Jennie Lorenzo – cello (track 4)
- Tony Maserati – mixing (tracks 8, 10)
- Glen McIntyre – backing vocals (track 6)
- Justin Meldal-Johnsen – bass (tracks 1, 2, 7, 9, 11)
- Peter Mokran – mixing (tracks 3, 5, 7, 9)
- Dean Nelson – mixing engineering assistance (track 1)
- Peter Nocella – viola (track 4)
- Noiztrip – production (track 11)
- Cassandra O'Neil – organ, piano (track 1); keyboards (track 3)
- George Pajon Jr. – guitar (tracks 5–7, 9, 11)
- Dave "Hard Drive" Pensado – mixing (track 2)
- Jack Joseph Puig – mixing (track 1)
- Montez Roberts – engineering assistance (track 4)
- Dan Rockett – guitar (track 10)
- Jeremy Ruzumna – keyboards (track 3)
- Rafael Serrano – mixing engineering assistance (tracks 4, 11, 12)
- Mike Shapiro – percussion (tracks 2, 9); drums (tracks 6, 8, 10)
- Caleb Speir – bass (tracks 3–5, 8, 10)
- Justin Timberlake – drums (track 4); backing vocals, keyboards, production (tracks 4, 10); guitar (track 10)
- Igor Szwec – violin (track 4)
- Doug Tyo – engineering assistance (tracks 2, 6, 8–10, 12)
- Jason Villaroman – recording engineering (tracks 1–3, 5, 6, 9, 10–12); programming (tracks 8, 10)
- Dave Way – mixing (tracks 4, 6, 11, 12)
- Eric Weaver – mixing engineeringassistance (tracks 3, 5, 7, 9)
- Khalfani White – backing vocals (track 12)
- Phillip White – percussion (track 2); backing vocals, production (tracks 2, 3)
- will.i.am – production (tracks 1, 4–8, 10–12); recording engineering (tracks 4, 6); programming (tracks 5, 6, 11, 12); keyboards (track 6); executive production
- Ethan Willoughby – recording engineering (track 4)
- Frank Wolf – recording engineering (tracks 1–3, 5, 9, 12)

== Charts ==
Chart (2007)	Peak position
Australian Urban Albums (ARIA)	15
Belgian Albums (Ultratop Flanders)	63
Canadian Albums (Nielsen SoundScan)	57
Czech Albums (ČNS IFPI)	38
Dutch Albums (Album Top 100)	56
European Albums (Billboard)	99
Finnish Albums (Suomen virallinen lista)	28
French Albums (SNEP)	149
Italian Albums (FIMI)	33
Japanese Albums (Oricon)	54
Scottish Albums (OCC)	87
Swiss Albums (Schweizer Hitparade)	38
Taiwanese Albums (Five Music)	11
UK Albums (OCC)	62
UK R&B Albums (OCC)	11
US Billboard 200	39
US Top R&B/Hip-Hop Albums (Billboard)	14

== Release history ==
Region	Date	Label	Ref.
Japan	March 21, 2007	Universal	
Netherlands	March 22, 2007	Universal	
Italy	March 23, 2007	Universal	
Australia	March 24, 2007	Universal	
France	March 26, 2007	Universal	
Germany	March 27, 2007	Universal	
United States	March 27, 2007	will.i.am; Geffen	
United Kingdom	April 2, 2007	Polydor	
