= Never (Jaheim song) =

Single by Jaheim

from the album The Makings of a Man
- Released: November 26, 2007
- Length: 4:16
- Label: Divine Mill; Atlantic
- Songwriters: Emmanuell Chisolm; Daniel Farris; Davion Farris; Jaheim Hoagland
- Producer: Daniel Farris

Jaheim singles chronology
"Struggle No More (The Main Event)" (2007)	"Never" (2007)	"Have You Ever" (2008)

"Never" is a single by American singer Jaheim. It was written by Jaheim along with Emmanuell Chisolm, Daniel Farris, and Davion Farris for his fourth studio album The Making of a Man, while production was helmed by Daniel Farris of WoodWorks Records. It peaked at number one US Adult R&B Songs chart.

== Charts ==
=== Weekly charts ===
Chart (2007–08)	Peak position
US Billboard Hot 100	76
US Adult R&B Songs (Billboard)	1
US Hot R&B/Hip-Hop Songs (Billboard)	12

=== Year-end charts ===
Chart (2008)	Position
US Hot R&B/Hip-Hop Songs (Billboard)	11
