= Hurt (Christina Aguilera song) =

Single by Christina Aguilera

from the album Back to Basics
- Released: September 12, 2006
- Recorded: 2006
- Studio: Kung Fu Gardens (North Hollywood, California); Conway Recording Studios (Hollywood, California)
- Genre: Pop
- Length: 4:03 (album version)
- Label: RCA
- Songwriters: Christina Aguilera; Linda Perry; Mark Ronson
- Producer: Linda Perry

Christina Aguilera singles chronology
"Ain't No Other Man" (2006)	"Hurt" (2006)	"Tell Me" (2006)

Music video
- "Hurt" on YouTube

"Hurt" is a song by American singer Christina Aguilera from her fifth studio album, Back to Basics (2006). It was serviced to US contemporary hit radio stations on September 12, 2006, as the album's second single, and was released for purchase in November. Written by Aguilera, Linda Perry, and Mark Ronson, and produced by Perry, the song is a pop ballad with lyrics describing how the protagonist deals with the loss of a loved one and was inspired by the death of Perry's father.

"Hurt" received mixed-to-positive reviews from music critics, who praised Aguilera's vocals but were ambivalent towards the production. The song peaked at number 19 on the Billboard Hot 100 and was certified platinum by the Recording Industry Association of America (RIAA). According to Nielsen SoundScan, the single has sold over 1.1 million copies in the United States. It was a top-ten hit in Europe and Oceania, entering the top ten of record charts in countries including Austria, Belgium, France, Germany, Ireland, and Sweden.

A music video for the song was directed by Floria Sigismondi who had previously worked with Aguilera on the video for "Fighter". The video was also co-directed by Aguilera. It depicts Aguilera as a 1940s circus star who suffers from her father's death. It won two MVPA Awards for Best Video and Best Direction of a Female Artist in 2007, and was nominated for a Juno Award for Video of the Year. Aguilera has performed the song live on a number of occasions, including at the 2006 MTV Video Music Awards and on Saturday Night Live. The track was included on the setlist of Aguilera's Back to Basics Tour in 2006 and 2007.

== Background and release ==
Aguilera's fifth studio album, Back to Basics, which consists of two discs, was released in August 2006. The second disc, described by Aguilera herself as "a '20s, '30s vibe," was solely produced by her longtime collaborater–producer Linda Perry. During the recording session, Aguilera wanted to record a song about the pain of losing a loved one and asked Perry for help. Perry developed the idea while thinking about her father, who had died less than a year earlier. She revealed, "And she [Aguilera] came to me, and had these two chords that her and this guy wrote, and she was like 'I really like these chords, can you turn this into a song? I want the song to be about losing someone'. And inside of me, I'm going 'You little fucking bitch, you totally know I lost my dad, and now you're gonna milk my emotions.'"

"Hurt" was released as the second single from Back to Basics following the album's lead single "Ain't No Other Man", which was released in June 2006. The song was serviced to US contemporary hit radio stations on September 12, 2006. It was subsequently released physically in Australia, Germany, and the United Kingdom in November. An extended play consisting of remixes of the song was made available digitally onto iTunes Stores on November 21, 2006. In France, the single was released physically on January 8, 2007. "Hurt" was not initially planned to be released as the follow-up to "Ain't No Other Man"; instead, "Candyman" was taken into consideration by Aguilera. Nevertheless, RCA Records decided to release "Hurt" as the album's second single afterwards because the label thought that it would be a commercial success similar to Aguilera's previous ballad "Beautiful" (2002).

== Composition ==
"Hurt" (2006)
A 22-second sample of "Hurt"

"Hurt" is a pop ballad that lasts for four minutes and three seconds. According to the music sheet published at Musicnotes.com by Alfred Publishing, "Hurt" is set in the key of E minor and has a moderate tempo of 72 beats per minute. Aguilera's vocals on the song range from the low note of G♯_{3} to the high note of E_{5}. Its instrumentation comes from bass, cello, contrabass, drums, guitar, piano, viola and violin. It starts with a piano opening backed by strings and, as noted by Bill Lamb of About.com, "as the words work their way to a climax accented by percussion then gently fade away again leaving the listener in stunned silence from the beauty of the moment." Lyrically, "Hurt" is an evocation of pain and guilt that accompanies the loss of a loved one. Joan Anderman from The Boston Globe commented that "Hurt" resembles her previous song "Beautiful" (2002), while Lindsay Levan of News & Record considered it an "intensely personal tune." Chuck Taylor of Billboard deemed the song's lyrics as "moving past a relationship in ruins."

== Critical reception ==
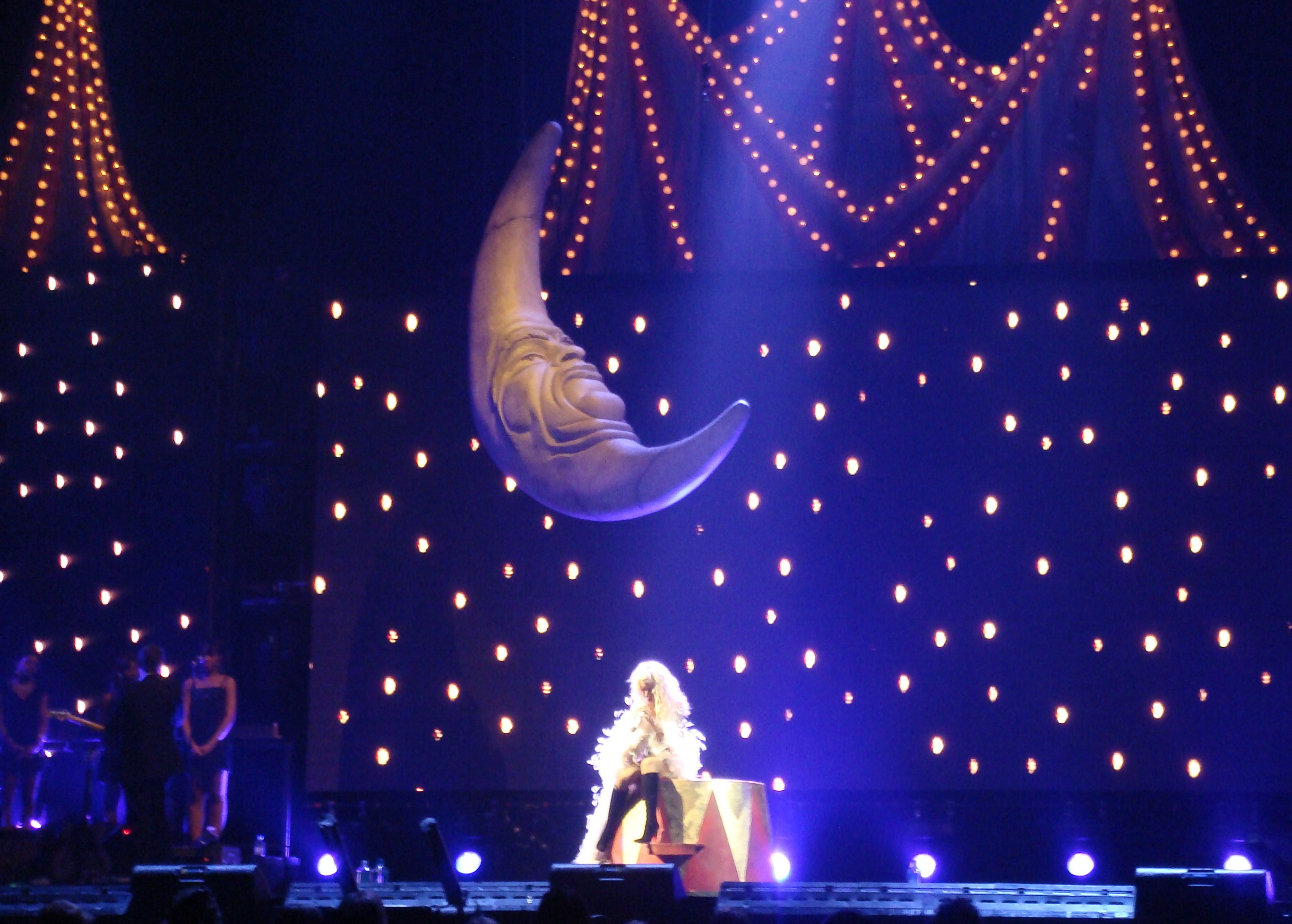
Aguilera performing "Hurt" against a circus-inspired theme on her Back to Basics Tour in 2006

Chuck Taylor from Billboard praised the song's production and Aguilera's vocals, noting that the song gives, "testament to Aguilera's stupefying gifts as an emotive, mature powerhouse singer." He also called the song "timeless pop". Jody Rosen of Entertainment Weekly said that the song's "self-help bromides Aguilera delivers with melodrama that would make Barbra Streisand shudder." Writing for Newsday, Glenn Gamboa opined that Back to Basics would not be complete without "big" ballads like "Hurt", which was described as a "wrenching" song. Describing the song as "the centerpiece" of Back to Basics's second disc, About.com reviewer Bill Lamb gave the song a five out of five stars rating, commenting that the song "does not always fit easily into the typical pop radio, but it is a song that is very likely to generate significant listener requests.".

Naomi West writing for The Daily Telegraph named "Hurt" a "supersized" ballad, while Dan Gennoe from Yahoo! Music called it "over the top" (OTT). In a review for musicOMH, John Murphy named the song a "touching ode", but was not impressed with the "sugary-sweet" string arrangement that "overwhelms" the song. Judy Faber from CBS News shared that the second disc of the album did not bring back the 1920s and 1930s sound, particularly with the "overwrought weeper" "Hurt". Rolling Stone magazine's Jenny Eliscu called "Hurt" an "incongruous schmaltzfest," while Thomas Inskeep from Stylus Magazine named "Hurt" an "overblown" ballad. Jason Scott, however, wrote in his review for PopDust: "It's a stunning, raw and evocative performance, and remains Aguilera's most honest." The track was deemed by AXS as Aguilera's best song, and as the fifth best song of 2006 by LiveAbout, which also called it an "instant classic".

== Chart performance ==
In the United States, "Hurt" debuted at number 100 on the Billboard Hot 100 on the chart issue dated October 14, 2006. During the week of December 16, the single reached its peak at number 19 after spending ten weeks on the chart. The single peaked at number one the Hot Dance Club Songs, number six on the Adult Contemporary, and number ten on the Mainstream Top 40. It was certified platinum by the Recording Industry Association of America (RIAA) for shipments of over 1,000,000 units in the country. As of August 2014, "Hurt" has sold over 1,187,000 million digital copies in the US. In Canada, "Hurt" peaked at number 28 on the Canadian Singles Chart and was certified gold by the Music Canada for exceeding shipments of 40,000 copies there.

In the United Kingdom, "Hurt" peaked at number 11 on the UK Singles Chart for two consecutive weeks and spent 15 weeks on the chart. In Scotland, it reached number eight on the Singles Chart in late November 2006. The song debuted at number four on the Ö3 Austria Top 40 chart, ultimately peaking at number two and spent a total of 27 weeks on the chart. "Hurt" peaked at number three in France, number two in Germany, and number one in Switzerland. It reached number one on the Portuguese Airplay Chart in March 2007, as reported by Nielsen Music Control. It was certified gold by the Syndicat National de l'Édition Phonographique (SNEP), gold in Germany, and in Switzerland.

== Music video ==
=== Background ===
The music video for "Hurt" was shot over five days in September 2006. It was co-directed by Aguilera alongside Floria Sigismondi, who had previously directed the music video for "Fighter" (2003). The video's concept was described as circus-inspired. During the first day of filming, the big top tent where the video was shot was "blown away" because of strong wind, which resulted in a delay in shooting and a change of location. The video premiered on October 17, 2006, on MTV's Total Request Live. In an interview with The Gazette, Aguilera revealed,

I definitely had a story for it – a specific story – that's why I felt that it was important for her and I to co-direct this particular video and song and she completely got it. She got my vision for it. She [Sigismondi] got where I was trying to go and what she brings to the table is so incredible and she's so creative and outstanding. And I always have a great time working with her. There was no ego involved, you know, me - that was the first video that I'd ever stepped up to the plate to literally co-direct. I'd always been very opinionated and very you know, I always voice my ideas and whatnot in my videos, but this was the first one I actually took credit for in co-directing. And she was just so great and generous in teaching me some of the ropes and learning about the different camera angles and you know, all the facets and details that go into making a video. So, she was really great and we had such fun with that. [...] And she's amazing. I can't you know, she came to the set dressed in different outfits that related to the circus everyday, so she's such an imaginative, creative spirit that I just have such fun working with energy like that.

=== Synopsis and reception ===
Aguilera portraying a 1940s circus star in the music video for the song

The video begins in black and white with the ending instrumental of "Enter the Circus"/"Welcome", over which a carnival barker (voiced by Linda Perry) introduces an audience to a circus. The transition to color begins when Aguilera appears in an old-fashioned dressing room, receiving flowers and then an important telegram saying, "We regret to inform you of the death of your father on the day of 02/09/1947." A flashback then shows a young Aguilera, played by Laci Kay, with her father, played by Timothy V. Murphy, raptured by the sight of the tightrope walker, played by Elizabeth Glassco. With her father's encouragement, Aguilera begins to train herself to do the same.

When the video switches to the real Aguilera, she is seen descending from the top of a circus tent on a rope, onto the back of an elephant, in pointe shoes and a structured jeweled outfit, with her father watching in the audience. She later attempts to greet him but is pulled away by fans and photographers. After being informed of the death of her father from the telegram and realizing that she was too wrapped up in her stardom to deal with what matters, she races through the circus in a belated attempt to find her father. Overwhelmed, Aguilera collapses on the ground and sees a silhouette of a man standing in front of the circus tent. Hoping the shadow figure to be her father, Aguilera holds out her hand with the elephant necklace on it to him. She breaks down crying when she realizes the silhouette has disappeared and that her father is gone. The video ends with a shot of Aguilera sitting on a circus box, singing and crying, before fading out to Aguilera's grief-stricken form on the ground outside the circus tent. The camera then zooms out and Aguilera is seen on the ground.

Michael Slezak from Entertainment Weekly commented that "the video actually makes me like the song more than I did when I heard it on its own." The video won two prizes at the 2007 MVPA Awards for Best Video and Best Direction of a Female Artist. It was also nominated for Video of the Year at the Juno Awards of 2007. The video received a Vevo Certified Award on YouTube for over 100 million views. The official music video on YouTube has now been viewed over 285 million times as of March 2025 and is cropped to the 14:9 aspect ratio.

== Live performances ==
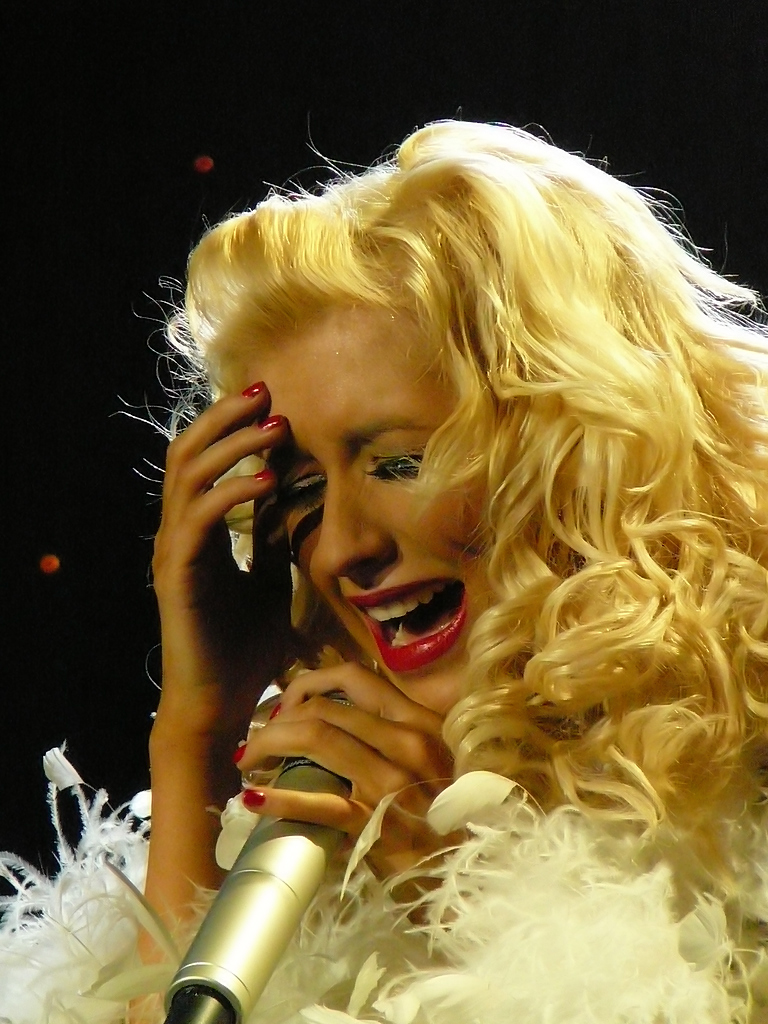
Aguilera performing "Hurt" on her Back to Basics Tour in 2006

Aguilera first performed the song at the MTV Video Music Awards on August 31, 2006; James Montgomery from MTV News named it one of the "high-gloss" moments of the event. Aguilera also promoted the song during the holiday season later that year, performing on the TV special Christmas at Rockefeller Center, aired by NBC on November 29, 2006. She sang the song on Saturday Night Live in November 2006. The promotion of the song also included performances on the European TV shows: Wetten, dass..? (in Germany, in December 2006), and Var mısın? Yok musun? (in Turkey, in October 2008).

"Hurt" was included on the setlist of Aguilera's Back to Basics Tour in 2006 and 2007. For the performance of the song, she dressed in a plume outfit designed by Roberto Cavalli and sang while a giant crescent moon descended from the ceiling. The performance recorded during Aguilera's show in Adelaide, Australia in 2007 was included on the Back to Basics: Live and Down Under DVD release.

In August 2023, Aguilera sang "Hurt" for the first time since 2008, during a concert in Rishon LeZion, Israel. She was accompanied by Eden Ben Zaken.

== Track listings and formats ==
European CD single

1. "Hurt" – 4:03
2. "Ain't No Other Man" (Shapeshifters Mixshow Mix) – 5:24

UK CD single 2

1. "Hurt" (Album Version) – 4:03
2. "Hurt" (Jake Ridley Mix) – 5:47
3. "Ain't No Other Man" (Shapeshifters Mixshow Mix) – 5:24
4. "Ain't No Other Man" (Video) – 3:47

Digital remix EP

1. "Hurt" (Deeper-Mindset Tight Mix) – 7:04
2. "Hurt" (Jack Shaft Main Mix) – 7:02
3. "Hurt" (Chris Cox Club Anthem) – 9:56
4. "Hurt" (JP & BSOD Electro Mix) – 6:01
5. "Hurt" (Jonathan Peters Classic Mix) – 9:30
6. "Hurt" (Jake Ridley Chillout Mix) – 5:47

Digital download

1. "Hurt" – 4:03
2. "Hurt" (Jake Ridley Chillout Mix) – 5:47
3. "Ain't No Other Man" (Shape: UK Mixshow) – 5:24

US CD maxi single (The Remixes)

1. "Hurt" (Deeper-Mindset Radio Mix) – 4:08
2. "Hurt" (Jack Shaft Main Mix) – 7:02
3. "Hurt" (Chris Cox Club Anthem) – 9:56
4. "Hurt" (JP & BSOD Electro Mix) – 6:01
5. "Hurt" (Deeper-Mindset Full On Club) – 9:30
6. "Hurt" (Jonathan Peters Classic Mix) – 9:30
7. "Hurt" (Jake Ridley Chillout Mix) – 5:47

Australian CD maxi-single

1. "Hurt" – 4:03
2. "Hurt" (Jake Ridley remix) – 5:47
3. "Ain't No Other Man" (Shapeshifters Mixshow Mix) – 5:24
4. "Hurt" (Video) – 4:53

Japanese CD single

1. "Hurt" – 4:03
2. "Hurt" (Jake Ridley remix) – 5:47
3. "Ain't No Other Man" (Shapeshifters Mixshow Mix) – 5:24
4. "Ain't No Other Man" (Junior Vasquez Club Mix) (Japanese bonus track) – 6:44

== Credits and personnel ==
- Christina Aguilera – songwriter
- Linda Perry – songwriter, producer, piano, audio engineer
- Eric Schermerhorn – guitar
- Paul III – bass guitar
- Nathan Wetherington – drums
- Kristofer Kaufman – audio assistant
- Peter Moktan – mixing
- Seth Waldmann – mixing assistant
- Sam Holland – mixing assistant

Credits and personnel are adapted from Back to Basics album liner notes.

== Charts ==
=== Weekly charts ===
Weekly chart performance
Chart (2006–2007)	Peak position
Australia (ARIA)	9
Austria (Ö3 Austria Top 40)	2
Belgium (Ultratop 50 Flanders)	3
Belgium (Ultratop 50 Wallonia)	5
Canada (Canadian Hot 100)	28
Canada AC (Billboard)	1
Canada Hot AC (Billboard)	8
Colombia (ASINCOL)	4
Czech Republic Airplay (ČNS IFPI)	17
Denmark (Tracklisten)	14
Europe (Eurochart Hot 100)	1
Europe (Nielsen Music Control)	3
Finland (Suomen virallinen lista)	15
Finland Download (Suomen virallinen lista)	2
France (SNEP)	3
Germany (GfK)	2
Global Dance Tracks (Billboard)	10
Greece (IFPI)	16
Hungary (Rádiós Top 40)	5
Ireland (IRMA)	6
Italy (FIMI)	12
Lithuania (EHR)	3
Netherlands (Dutch Top 40)	2
Netherlands (Single Top 100)	2
Norway (VG-lista)	11
Portugal (Nielsen Music Control)	1
Romania (Romanian Top 100)	6
Russia Airplay (TopHit)	42
Scottish Singles Sales (Official Charts)	8
Slovakia Airplay (ČNS IFPI)	2
Sweden (Sverigetopplistan)	2
Switzerland (Schweizer Hitparade)	1
UK Singles (Official Charts)	11
UK Physical Singles (OCC)	7
US Billboard Hot 100	19
US Adult Contemporary (Billboard)	6
US Adult Pop Airplay (Billboard)	15
US Dance Club Songs (Billboard)	1
US Dance Singles Sales (Billboard)	2
US Pop Airplay (Billboard)	10

Chart (2009)	Peak position
UK Singles (Official Charts)	25

=== Year-end charts ===
Annual chart rankings
Chart (2006)	Position
Australia (ARIA)	68
Austria (Ö3 Austria Top 40)	50
Germany (Media Control GfK)	78
Netherlands (Dutch Top 40)	40
Netherlands (Single Top 100)	49
Sweden (Hitlistan)	17
Switzerland (Schweizer Hitparade)	24
UK Singles (OCC)	150

Chart (2007)	Position
Austria (Ö3 Austria Top 40)	20
Belgium (Ultratop 50 Flanders)	26
Belgium (Ultratop 50 Wallonia)	16
Europe (Eurochart Hot 100)	15
France (SNEP)	17
French Airplay (SNEP)	100
Germany (Media Control GfK)	30
Hungary (Rádiós Top 40)	45
Netherlands (Dutch Top 40)	62
Netherlands (Single Top 100)	35
Russia Airplay (TopHit)	73
Singapore Airplay (Mediacorp)	27
Sweden (Sverigetopplistan)	71
Switzerland (Schweizer Hitparade)	22
US Adult Contemporary (Billboard)	14
US Dance Club Play (Billboard)	37

== Certifications ==
Region	Certification	Certified units/sales
Australia (ARIA)	Gold	35,000^{^}
Austria (IFPI Austria)	Gold	15,000^{*}
Belgium (BRMA)	Gold	25,000^{*}
Canada (Music Canada)	Gold	20,000^{*}
Denmark (IFPI Danmark)	Gold	4,000^{^}
France (SNEP)	Gold	200,000^{*}
Germany (BVMI)	Gold	150,000^{^}
New Zealand (RMNZ)	Gold	15,000^{‡}
Switzerland (IFPI Switzerland)	Gold	15,000^{^}
United Kingdom (BPI)	Gold	400,000^{‡}
United States (RIAA)	Platinum	1,000,000^{‡}
^{*} Sales figures based on certification alone.^{^} Shipments figures based on certification alone.^{‡} Sales+streaming figures based on certification alone.

== Release history ==
Region	Date	Format(s)	Label(s)	Ref.
United States	September 12, 2006	Contemporary hit radio	RCA	
United Kingdom	October 30, 2006	Digital download	RCA	
Germany	November 3, 2006	Maxi	Sony BMG	
Australia	November 4, 2006	CD	Sony BMG	
United Kingdom	November 13, 2006	CD	RCA	
Various	November 21, 2006	Digital download (EP)	RCA	
Taiwan	December 1, 2006	Maxi	Sony BMG	
Japan	December 20, 2006	Maxi	Sony BMG	
France	January 8, 2007	CD	Jive	

== See also ==
- List of number-one dance singles of 2007 (U.S.)
- "Tell Me" (Diddy song)
