= Abstrac =

American rhythm and blues group

- Also known as: M & M
- Origin: New York City, United States
- Genres: New jack swing, R&B
- Occupations: singer, songwriter, session vocalist
- Years active: 1989–1992
- Labels: Reprise, Atlantic
- Past members: Topaz Del Bettis; Mary Brown; Marsha McClurkin

Abstrac (sometimes stylized as Abstrac') was a female R&B/dance trio. Their Reprise single "Right and Hype" was listed on the Billboard Hot 100 for six weeks in 1989–1990, reaching position 89. This song also appeared on the Hot Black Singles chart, achieving a position of 23 and appearing for 17 weeks.

Members Mary Brown and Marsha McClurkin subsequently formed a new jack swing duo named M & M after the departure of Topaz Del Bettis. Marsha McClurkin is a relative of gospel singer Donnie McClurkin.

== Albums ==
As Abstrac:

- Abstrac (Reprise, 1989)

As M & M:

- Get To Know Ya Betta (Atlantic, 1992)
