= Struggle Love =

Studio album by Jaheim
- Released: March 18, 2016
- Labels: Julie's Dream; BMG

Jaheim chronology
Appreciation Day (2013)	Struggle Love (2016)

Singles from Struggle Love
- 1. "Back In My Arms" Released: June 2015; 2. "Struggle Love" Released: April 2016; 3. "Be That Dude" Released: March 23, 2017

Struggle Love is the seventh studio album by American recording artist Jaheim. It was released by Julie's Dream and BMG Records on March 18, 2016.

== Critical reception ==
Professional ratings
Review scores
Source	Rating
AllMusic	4/5 stars

Andy Kellman of AllMusic gave the album four stars out of five, saying "The album also continues Jaheim's tradition of referencing classic R&B ballads. This time, it's the Deele's "Two Occasions," embellished with a generous rhythmic bump to complement a yearning (well, thirsting) vocal. As much as the pure sound of his voice remains roughly 65-percent Vandross, 35-percent Pendergrass, the singer's flow is still his own, as his ability to deliver an explicit line without the slightest smirk."

== Commercial performance ==
The album debuted at number 24 on the US Billboard 200 chart.

== Track listing ==
No.	Title	Writer(s)	Producer(s)	Length
1.	"My Shoes"	Nicolas Lambert; Wesley Hogges; Stan Wallace	Jaheim	4:45
2.	"Craziest Place"	Jaheim Hoagland; Balewa Muhammad; John "SK" McGee; Perry Mapp; Troy Taylor; Charles Amos; Ricky Rutland	Amos; Rutland	3:38
3.	"Nights Like This"	Askia Fountain; Avery Segers; Muhammad; Clifton Lighty; Isaac Hayes III; Hoagland; James Smith; Julius Rivera; Orlando Williamson; Ronald Ferebee Jr.; Shanell Irving; Shaunice Lasha Jones; Vincent Thomas	Yonni; Amos; Rutland	3:37
4.	"Struggle Love"	Alex Cowan; Alice Russell; Muhammad; David Guppy; Hoagland; Mike Simmonds; Mapp	Amos; Rutland	3:48
5.	"Songs to Have Sex to"	Muhammad; Dominick Lamb; Hoagland; Mapp	Vidal Davis	4:19
6.	"If Someone Asks"	Muhammad; Hoagland; Mapp; Tenille Johnson	Amos; Rutland	3:54
7.	"Something Tells Me"	Muhammad; Lamb; Hoagland; Mapp	Nottz	3:22
8.	"If I Were You"	Muhammad; Hoagland; Mapp	Amos; Xavier Fairley Jr	3:54
9.	"Be That Dude"	Muhammad; Hoagland; Kenneth Edmonds; Mapp; Sidney Johnson; Stanley Bristol	Sheldon Ellerby; Toby Davis	2:56
10.	"Back in My Arms"	Muhammad; Candice Nelson; Hoagland; Mapp; Cedric Solomon	Solomon	5:40
11.	"Keep"	Muhammad; Hoagland; Mapp; Amos; Rutland	Amos; Rutland	4:34
12.	"Always Come Back"	Hoagland; Bastiany; Eritza Laues; Mapp; Muhammad	Balewa; Bastiany; Jaheim	3:41
13.	"Side Piece"	Muhammad; Cannon Mapp; Laues; Hoagland; Mapp	Amos; Rutland	3:42
14.	"Aholic"	Muhammad; Hoagland; Sylvester Jordan; Ellerby; T. Davis	Ellerby; T. Davis	3:56

Target bonus tracks
No.	Title	Length
15.	"One by One"	3:14
16.	"Speak Up"	3:46

== Charts ==
=== Weekly charts ===
Chart (2016)	Peak position
US Billboard 200	24
US Independent Albums (Billboard)	1
US Top R&B/Hip-Hop Albums (Billboard)	2

=== Year-end charts ===
Chart (2016)	Position
US Top R&B/Hip-Hop Albums (Billboard)	63
