= Ghetto Classics =

Studio album by Jaheim
- Released: February 13, 2006
- Genre: R&B
- Length: 42:52
- Label: Divine Mill; Warner Bros.
- Producer: Terence Abney; Balewa; Bernard Belle; Bink!; Boola; The Co-Stars; Eddie F; Wesley Hogges; KayGee; Darren Lighty; Scott Storch; T.O.; Eric Williams

Jaheim chronology
Still Ghetto (2002)	Ghetto Classics (2006)	The Makings of a Man (2007)

Singles from Ghetto Classics
- 1. "Everytime I Think About Her" Released: 2005; 2. "The Chosen One" Released: 2006; 3. "I Ain't Never" Released: 2006

Ghetto Classics is the third studio album by American R&B singer Jaheim. It was released by Warner Bros. Records on February 13, 2006 in the United States, and the following day in the United Kingdom on February 14. As with his previous albums, production and songwriting duties were handled by former Naughty by Nature DJ KayGee as well as Terence "Tramp Baby" Abney, Darren Lighty, Eddie F, Bink, Scott Storch, Balewa Muhammad, Wesley Hogges, Eric Williams, and The Co-Stars.

It debuted at number one on both the US Billboard 200 and the Top R&B/Hip-Hop Albums, selling 153,000 copies in its first week of release. Ghetto Classics spawned the moderate hit "Everytime I Think about Her", featuring Jadakiss. Although the album stayed on the album charts for only thirteen weeks, it was certified Gold by the Recording Industry Association of America (RIAA) on March 21, 2006.

== Critical reception ==
Professional ratings
Aggregate scores
Source	Rating
Metacritic	67/100
Review scores
Source	Rating
About.com	4.5/5 stars
AllMusic	4/5 stars
Entertainment Weekly	C−
The Guardian	3/5 stars
People	3.5/4 stars
PopMatters	5/10
Rolling Stone	3.5/5 stars
Stylus Magazine	B−
USA Today	3/4 stars
Vibe	4/5 stars

At Metacritic, which assigns a rated mean out of 100 from mainstream critics, the album received a score of 67, which indicates "generally favorable reviews," based on 13 reviews. Allmusic editor John Bush found that "Ghetto Classics may boast nothing as ambitious as 2002's [single] "Fabulous", and it may amp up the rapper collaborations in search of hits (Jadakiss and Styles P have appearances), but overall very little distracts from the qualities that have made him the most durable talent in commercial yet traditional R&B music [...] The final three songs ditch the samples for straight R&B, and while the absence is missed, it represents an intriguing direction for Jaheim in the future. Classic R&B may seem like just a memory to some, but with artists like Heather Headley and Jaheim in action, it doesn't have to be about the past."

== Track listing ==
No.	Title	Writer(s)	Producer(s)	Length
1.	"The Chosen One"	Bernard Belle; Keir Gist; Cliff Lighty; Balewa Muhammad; Frank "Sekay" Oliphant	Belle; Boola; KayGee	3:50
2.	"Everytime I Think About Her" (featuring Jadakiss)	Roosevelt Harrell; Jason Phillips	Bink	4:26
3.	"Daddy Thing"	Gist; Muhammad; Oliphant	Balewa; KayGee; T.O.	3:50
4.	"Forgetful"	Scott Storch	Storch	3:42
5.	"Like a DJ"	Terence Abney; Gist; Eritza Laues; Darren Lighty; Muhammad; Oliphant	Eddie F; D. Lighty; KayGee; Abney	3:48
6.	"Fiend" (featuring Styles P)	Abney; Thom Bell; Gist; William "Poogie" Hart; Muhammad	KayGee; Abney	4:55
7.	"I Ain't Never"	Jaheim Hoagland; Muhammad	Balewa; The Co-Stars	4:01
8.	"125th"	Hoagland; Melvin Lewis; Larry Roberts; Sylvia Robinson; Eric Williams	Williams; Wesley Hogges	4:16
9.	"Masterpiece"	Lewis; Williams	Williams; Hogges	4:02
10.	"Conversation"	Hoagland	Williams; Hogges	3:01
11.	"Come Over"	Hogges; Harry Jordan; Williams	Williams; Hogges	3:01

Sample credits

- "The Chosen One" contains a sample of the recording "I Choose You" as performed by Willie Hutch.
- "Daddy Thing" contains interpolations from "To Be True" as written by K. Gamble and L. Huff.
- "Like a DJ" contains interpolations from "Time Warp" as written by Eddie Grant.
- "Fiend" contains samples from "I'm Sorry" as performed by The Delfonics.
- "I Ain't Never" contains excerpts "Stay with Me" as performed by Marilyn McCoo and Billy Davis Jr.
- "125th" contains interpolations from "Not On the Outside" as written by Larry Roberts and Sylvia Robinson.

== Charts ==
=== Weekly charts ===
Chart (2006)	Peak position
US Billboard 200	1
US Top R&B/Hip-Hop Albums (Billboard)	1

=== Year-end charts ===
Chart (2006)	Position
US Billboard 200	166
US Top R&B/Hip-Hop Albums (Billboard)	22

== Certifications ==
Region	Certification	Certified units/sales
United States (RIAA)	Gold	500,000^{^}
^{^} Shipments figures based on certification alone.
