= Everytime I Think About Her =

Single by Jaheim featuring Jadakiss

from the album Ghetto Classics
- Released: 2006
- Length: 4:15
- Label: Divine Mill; Warner Bros.
- Songwriter(s): Roosevelt Harrell; Jason Phillips
- Producer(s): Bink

Jaheim singles chronology
"Diamond in da Ruff" (2003)	"Everytime I Think About Her" (2006)	"The Chosen One" (2006)

"Everytime I Think About Her" is a song by American R&B singer Jaheim, and features additional vocals from rapper Jadakiss. Produced by Bink, it was recorded for his third studio album Ghetto Classics (2006). The song contains a sample from "The Sly, Slick, and Wicked" by the Lost Generation and "I Choose You" by Willie Hutch.

== Charts ==
Chart (2005)	Peak position
US Adult R&B Songs (Billboard)	38
US Hot R&B/Hip-Hop Songs (Billboard)	17
