= The Makings of a Man =

Studio album by Jaheim
- Released: December 18, 2007
- Genre: R&B
- Length: 46:32
- Label: Divine Mill; Atlantic
- Producer: Babyface; Carvin & Ivan; Brian "BK" Coleman; Daniel Farris; Fatso; KayGee; R. Kelly

Jaheim chronology
Ghetto Classics (2006)	The Makings of a Man (2007)	Another Round (2010)

Singles from The Makings of a Man
- 1. "Never" Released: November 26, 2007; 2. "Have You Ever" Released: February 1, 2008; 3. "I've Changed" Released: February 6, 2008; 4. "Lonely" Released: December 21, 2008

Professional ratings
Review scores
Source	Rating
About.com	3.5/5 stars
Allmusic	4/5 stars
USA Today	3/4 stars

The Makings of a Man is the fourth studio album by Jaheim. It was released by Divine Mill Records and Atlantic Records on December 18, 2007 in the United States. The album debuted at number 11 on the US Billboard 200 with first week sales of 176,000 copies. The Makings of a Man has been certified Gold by the Recording Industry Association of America (RIAA). It has now sold over 500,000 copies since its release.

== Track listing ==
No.	Title	Producer(s)	Length
1.	"Voice of R&B"	Jaheim	2:55
2.	"Hush"	R. Kelly	3:44
3.	"Have You Ever"	KayGee	3:49
4.	"Lonely"	KayGee	4:44
5.	"Life of a Thug"	KayGee	4:29
6.	"Just Don't Have A Clue"	Babyface	4:55
7.	"She Ain't You"	Fatso	3:23
8.	"Never"	Daniel Farris	4:16
9.	"I've Changed" (featuring Keyshia Cole)	Brian "BK" Coleman; KayGee	4:02
10.	"What You Think of That"	Carvin & Ivan	3:26
11.	"Make a Wish"	Jaheim	3:51
12.	"Back Together Again"	Jaheim	4:03

Circuit City bonus tracks
No.	Title	Length
13.	"Roster"	3:12
14.	"Keep It 100"	4:14

== Charts ==
=== Weekly charts ===
Chart (2007)	Peak position
US Billboard 200	11
US Top R&B/Hip-Hop Albums (Billboard)	3

=== Year-end charts ===
Chart (2008)	Position
US Billboard 200	83
US Top R&B/Hip-Hop Albums (Billboard)	11

== Certifications ==
Region	Certification	Certified units/sales
United States (RIAA)	Gold	500,000^{^}
^{^} Shipments figures based on certification alone.
