= Appreciation Day =

Studio album by Jaheim
- Released: September 3, 2013
- Genre: R&B
- Length: 51:58
- Label: Atlantic

Jaheim chronology
Another Round (2010)	Appreciation Day (2013)	Struggle Love (2016)

Singles from Appreciation Day
- 1. "Age Ain't a Factor" Released: August 2013; 2. "Baby x3" Released: September 2013

Appreciation Day is the sixth studio album by American recording artist Jaheim. The album was released on September 3, 2013.

== Critical response ==
Professional ratings
Review scores
Source	Rating
AllMusic	3.5/5 stars

Appreciation Day was met with a generally positive reviews from music critics. Andy Kellman of AllMusic gave the album three and a half stars out of five, saying "When Jaheim announced his first album in three years, which followed five straight Top Five R&B albums, he said, "I decided to call the project Appreciation Day because that’s exactly what this album is…my show of appreciation to them."

== Commercial performance ==
The album debuted at number 6 on the US Billboard 200 chart, with first-week sales of 58,000 copies in the United States. The album has sold 175,000 copies in the US as of February 2016.

== Track listing ==
No.	Title	Writer(s)	Producer(s)	Length
1.	"Age Ain't a Factor"	Jaheim Hoagland; Courtney Dwight; Sheldon Ellerby; Ernest Isley; Marvin Isley; O'Kelly Isley; Ronald Isley; Rudolph Isley; Christopher Jasper; Eritza Laues; Cannon Mapp; Balewa Muhammad	Blaqsmurph; Coz; Jaheim	3:15
2.	"He Don't Exist"	Hoagland; Tobby Davis; Sheldon Ellerby; Raymel Menefee; Laues; Mapp; Muhammad	Davis; Coz; Jaheim	3:57
3.	"Morning"	Hoagland; Billy Beck; Ellerby; Laues; Muhammad; Larry Troutman	Coz; Jaheim	3:47
4.	"What She Really Means"	Hoagland; Dwight; Ellerby; Laues; Mapp; Muhammad	Blaqsmurph; Coz; Jaheim	3:48
5.	"Pussy Appreciation Day"	Hoagland; Anthony Bell; Jazquan Mack; Muhammad	Bell; Jaheim	4:03
6.	"Baby X3"	Hoagland; Davis; Ellerby; Muhammad; Hadlya Nelson	Davis; Coz; Jaheim	4:14
7.	"Shower Scene"	Hoagland; Ellerby; Muhammad; Charles Pettaway	Pettaway; Coz; Jaheim	3:27
8.	"Sexting"	Hoagland; Marcella Brailsford; Kier Gist; Rob Lewis; Muhammad; Marcella Precise; Terence Abney	Jaheim; KayGee; Lady and a Tramp; Lewis	3:11
9.	"I Found You"	Hoagland; Pacal Bayley	DJ Pain One; Jaheim	3:19
10.	"Florida"	Hoagland; Darren Lighty; Muhammad	Lighty	4:48
11.	"Sticks N Stones"	Hoagland; Ray Angry; Brailsford; Gist; Nastacia "Nazz" Kendall; Muhammad; Precise; Abney	Jaheim; KayGee; Lady and a Tramp; Angry	3:24
12.	"First Time"	Hoagland; Bastiany; Laues; Mapp; Muhammad	Balewa; Bastiany; Jaheim	3:32
13.	"Blame Me"	Hoagland; Durell Bishop; Ervin Drake; Robert Littlejohn Jr.; Muhammad	Jaheim; Jay Fenix	3:43
14.	"Chase Forever"	Hoagland; Bastiany; Laues; Mapp; Muhammad	Balewa; Bastiany; Jaheim	3:31

Sample credits

- "Age Ain't a Factor" contains interpolations from the composition "Groove with Me" as performed by The Isley Brothers.
- "Morning" contains elements of "As We Lay" as performed by Shirley Murdock.
- "Blame Me" contains elements of "It Was a Very Good Year" as performed by Frank Sinatra.

== Charts ==
=== Weekly charts ===
Chart (2013)	Peak position
US Billboard 200	6
US Top R&B/Hip-Hop Albums (Billboard)	3

=== Year-end charts ===
Chart (2013)	Position
US Top R&B/Hip-Hop Albums (Billboard)	50
Chart (2014)	Position
US Top R&B/Hip-Hop Albums (Billboard)	90
