= Fabulous (Jaheim song) =

Single by Jaheim featuring Tha' Rayne

from the album Still Ghetto
- Released: October 15, 2002
- Recorded: May 2001
- Genre: R&B
- Length: 3:47
- Label: Divine Mill; Warner Bros.
- Songwriters: Balewa Muhammad; Eddie Berkeley; Gene McFadden; John Whitehead; Keir Gist; Mary Brown; Victor Carstarphen
- Producers: Berkeley; KayGee

Jaheim singles chronology
"Anything" (2002)	"Fabulous" (2002)	"Put That Woman First" (2003)

"Fabulous" is a song by American singer Jaheim, featuring guest vocals by Tha' Rayne. It served as the first single from his second studio album Still Ghetto (2002). It was produced by KayGee and Eddie Berkeley, containing a sample from "Wake Up Everybody" by Harold Melvin and the Blue Notes. "Fabulous" peaked at number seven on the US Billboard Hot R&B/Hip-Hop Singles & Tracks chart, also reaching number 28 on the Billboard Hot 100, as well as number one on the Adult R&B Songs for three weeks from February 1, 2003 to February 22, 2003. An accompanying music video for it was shot in August 2002 in New Jersey, and includes appearances by Mary J. Blige and Tha' Rayne.

== Remix ==
The official remix of the song, "Fabulous (The Diplomat Remix)", was released to radio in December 2002, featuring Dipset rappers Cam'Ron and Juelz Santana and R&B group Tha' Rayne. A CD single with the remix was released in the UK on February 24, 2003, and peaked at number 41 on the Singles Charts. Juelz Santana was uncredited on his part of the remix.

== Track listing ==
12" Single (February 24, 2003) – UK release

1. "Fabulous" (clean)
2. "Fabulous" (instrumental)
3. "Fabulous" (remix feat. Cam'ron, Juelz Santana, & Tha' Rayne (clean))
4. "Fabulous" (remix feat. Cam'ron, Juelz Santana, & Tha' Rayne (dirty))

CD Single (February 24, 2003) – UK release

1. "Fabulous" (clean)
2. "Fabulous" (instrumental)
3. "Fabulous" (remix feat. Cam'ron, Juelz Santana, & Tha' Rayne (clean))
4. "Fabulous" (remix feat. Cam'ron, Juelz Santana, & Tha' Rayne (dirty))

== Charts ==
Chart (2002–03)	Peak position
Scottish Singles Sales (Official Charts)	87
UK Singles (Official Charts)	41
UK Hip Hop/R&B (Official Charts)	8
US Adult R&B Songs (Billboard)	1
US Billboard Hot 100	28
US Hot R&B/Hip-Hop Songs (Billboard)	7
