= Tha' Rayne =

American R&B singing girl group

- Origin: United States
- Genres: R&B
- Years active: 2000–2005
- Label: Divine Mill/Arista
- Past members: Shaquana Elam (2000–2005); Yummy Bingham (2000–2004); Hadiya Nelson(2004–2005); Tina Jenkins (2000–2001); Michelle Colon (2002–2005); Qiana Drew (2003–2004)

Tha' Rayne was an American R&B singing girl group that was formed in 2000 and disbanded in mid–2005. Tha' Rayne was a trio consisted of two singing members and a DJ/rapper. The original members of the group were Yummy Bingham and Shaquana Elam (now known as Quana BelleVoix), who shared lead vocals on all of the group's recordings.

== Biography ==
The group was founded in 2000 by producer KayGee from Naughty by Nature, who recruited Elizabeth "Yummy" Bingham, Shaquana "Quana" Elam and Tina "Tina-J" Jenkins. Each was looking for a solo deal and then discovered it would be for a girl group.

The first and only recording where the three original members appear together is Jaheim and Lil' Mo's "Finders Keepers" (2001), performing vocal backup. After Tina-J left the group, Tha' Rayne remained a duet and signed in April 2001, with Arista Records's CEO Antonio "L.A." Reid. They released Rock wit Me in April 2002, followed in July by "No L.O.V.E." (re-recorded by Jhené Aiko in 2003). While preparing their debut album, originally expected for an October 2002 release, Tha' Rayne collaborated with artists such as Boyz II Men, Jaheim, Queen Latifah, and Next.

In August 2002, Kay Gee had the vision to create an R&B version of Salt-N-Pepa welcoming to the group Michelle "DJ Myche Luv" Colon, a young female DJ. The trio was featured on Jaheim's hit single "Fabulous".

In January 2003, the group went through a change of the lineup with the departure of DJ MycheLuv, who was replaced on January 27, 2003 by Qiana "DJ Qi" Drew. Soon after, Tha' Rayne released "Didn't You Know" (featuring Joe Budden and Lupe Fiasco), their first single to chart, reaching number 76 on the Billboard Hot R&B/Hip-Hop Songs chart. It was produced by Rich Harrison but did not get the buzz expected by the label, so their debut album Reign Supreme was delayed.

When Arista merged into Sony BMG in early 2004 many artists were dropped, including Tha' Rayne. The group decided to split, with each member going solo, but KayGee convinced Quana and DJ MycheLuv to reform the group with a new member named Hadiya Nelson a.k.a. Deeyah. This new version of the group recorded a demo but disbanded a year later in August 2005.

The ultimate line-up of Tha'Rayne reunited in 2026, recording and releasing music under the name The Goods.

== Discography ==
=== Singles ===
Year	Single	Chart positions		
Year	Single	US	US R&B	UK
2003	"Didn't You Know": 12" Promo Single (US) : April 30, 2003; 12" Single (US) : July 15, 2003; Digital Download (US) : June 2, 2003; Radio Impact (US) : August 4, 2003; 12" Promo W/remix (US) : August 10, 2003; 12" Promo W/remix (UK) : September, 2003; Digital Download W/remix (US) : Oct. 13, 2003; 12" Single W/remix (US) : Oct. 13, 2003; CD Single W/remix (US) : Oct. 14, 2003	—	76	—
2002	"Kiss Me" feat. Lupe Fiasco: 12" Promo Single (US) : December 9, 2002	—	—	—
2002	"Fabulous" Jaheim featuring Tha' Rayne Album: Jaheim's Still Ghetto: Digital Download (US) : September 2002; Radio Impact (US) : October 2002; 12" Single (UK) : February 24, 2003; CD Single (UK) : February 24, 2003	28	7	41
2002	"No L.O.V.E.": 12" Single (US) : July 9, 2002	—	—	—
2002	"Rock wit Me": 12" Single (US) : April 23, 2002	—	—	—
