= Jaheim =

American R&B singer (born 1978)

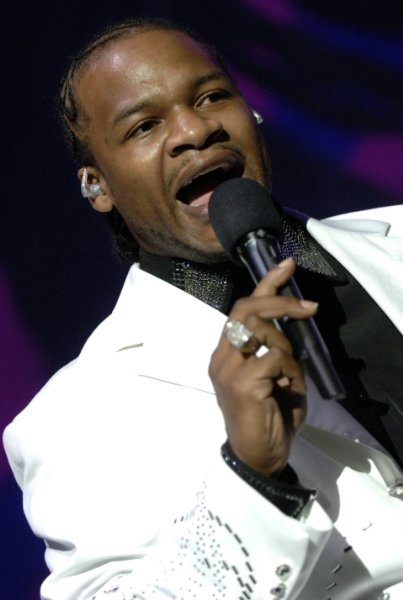

Background information
- Also known as: Jaheim, Jah (Jah)
- Born: Jaheim H. Hoagland; May 26, 1978 (age 48); New Brunswick, New Jersey, U.S.
- Genres: R&B, hip hop
- Occupations: Singer-songwriter, producer
- Years active: 1996–present
- Labels: Warner Bros. Records, Atlantic Records, BMG, Julie's Dream Music Group
- Website: jaheimmusic.com

Jaheim H. Hoagland (born May 26, 1978), known mononymously as Jaheim, is an American R&B singer. He was signed by Naughty by Nature's Kaygee to Divine Mill Records in 2000 and released his debut album Ghetto Love in 2001. His second effort, Still Ghetto (2002), contains the hit singles "Put That Woman First" (2003) and "Fabulous". (2003)

Jaheim's third album, Ghetto Classics, was released on February 13, 2006, debuting at number one on the U.S. Billboard 200, and selling over 153,000 copies in its first week.

== Music career ==
Four years after he recorded a tape that led to a deal with Divine Mill Records (a division of Warner Bros. Records). Hoagland received good reactions from two singles "Could It Be" and "Lil' Nigga Ain't Mine" on BET video shows. Appearing with Hoagland on his first album was RL (from Next), Blackstreet and Darren and Cliff Lighty.

His second album, Still Ghetto, was released on November 5, 2002. Another Top Ten hit, it placed two singles in the Top 40, "Fabulous" and "Anything" (released November 13, 2001). Ghetto Classics followed in early 2006 and became his first number one album. In 2007, Jaheim signed to Atlantic Records and released his fourth album The Makings of a Man in December 2007.

In late 2009, the single "Ain't Leavin Without You" preceded his 2010 album Another Round. In 2013, Jaheim returned to the music industry with a new single titled "Age Ain't a Factor" and a new album. His sixth album, Appreciation Day, was released on September 3, 2013. In 2014, Jaheim restarted his own label called "Julie's Dream Music Group", which had first been started in 1997, then restarted in 2002.

Following the relaunch of his label in February 2015, Jaheim signed a new record deal with BMG Records after parting ways with Atlantic Records in conjunction with his Julie's Dream label. In June 2015, Jaheim released a new single called "Back in My Arms" and revealed that his seventh album, titled Struggle Love, is to be released. Struggle Love was released on March 18, 2016. To date, Jaheim has sold 5 million records worldwide and received three Grammy nominations.

== Personal life ==
Jaheim is a resident of Hillsborough Township, New Jersey. Jaheim is the grandson of the late 1960s soul singer Hoagy Lands.

In September 2021, he was arrested on animal cruelty charges after police discovered 15 dogs living in deplorable conditions at his New Jersey home. One of the dogs had to be euthanized. In May 2025, he was arrested on six counts of animal cruelty.

== Discography ==
Studio albums

- Ghetto Love (2001)
- Still Ghetto (2002)
- Ghetto Classics (2006)
- The Makings of a Man (2007)
- Another Round (2010)
- Appreciation Day (2013)
- Struggle Love (2016)

Compilation albums

- Classic Jaheim, Vol. 1 (2008)

== Awards and nominations ==
American Music Awards

Year	Nominee / work	Award	Result
2003	—N/a	Favorite Soul/R&B Male Artist	Nominated

Grammy Awards

Year	Nominee / work	Award	Result
2011	Another Round	Best R&B Album	Nominated
2011	"Finding My Way Back"	Best Male R&B Vocal Performance	Nominated
2011	"Finding My Way Back"	Best R&B Song	Nominated

Soul Train Music Awards

Year	Nominee / work	Award	Result
2002	"Just in Case"	Best R&B/Soul Single, Male	Nominated
2002	Ghetto Love	Best R&B/Soul Album, Male	Nominated
2003	Still Ghetto	Best R&B/Soul Album, Male	Nominated
2004	"Put That Woman First"	Best R&B/Soul Single, Male	Nominated
2010	—N/a	Best Male R&B/Soul Artist	Nominated
