= Where'z Da' Party At? =

Single by Miilkbone

from the album Da' Miilkrate
- Released: July 13, 1995
- Studio: Marion Studios (Fairview, New Jersey)
- Genre: East coast hip hop
- Length: 3:11
- Label: Capitol Records
- Songwriters: Thomas Wlodarczyk; Kier Gist; George Brown
- Producers: Gary Gersh (exec.); James "Pookie" Gist (exec.); Tracy Waples (exec.); KayGee

Miilkbone singles chronology
"Keep It Real" (1995)	"Where'z Da' Party At?" (1995)	"Da Truth" (1999)

"Where'z Da' Party At?" is a song by American hip hop recording artist Miilkbone, released as the second single from his debut studio album Da' Miilkrate in 1995. The song samples rapper The Notorious B.I.G.'s "Party and Bullshit". "Where'z Da' Party At ?" debuted at No. 21 on the Billboard Hot Rap Songs chart and peaked at No. 17 in an eight-week run on the chart. It also reached No. 65 on the Billboard R&B singles chart, remaining on that chart for three weeks.

== Music video ==
The music video features appearances from rappers Nas, Sticky Fingaz, and affiliate Naughty By Nature. It received moderate airplay on BET reaching No. 10. It reached The Box Music Video Channel's Box Top List for the week of October 28, 1995.

== Formats and track listings ==
These are the formats and track listings of major single releases of "Where'z Da' Party At ?".

- CD single
1. "No Gimmicks"
2. "Where'z Da' Party At?" (Mufi's Mix)
3. "Where'z Da' Party At?" (Block Party Mix)
4. "Where'z Da' Party At?" (Tray Wop's Mix)
5. "Where'z Da' Party At?" (Tray Wop's Mix)
6. "Where'z Da' Party At?" (There'z A Party Over Here Mix)
7. "Where'z Da' Party At?" (Instrumental)
8. "Where'z Da' Party At?" (Remix Instrumental)
9. "Keep It Real" (Remix) (featuring AZ and Redman)
- 12" single
1. "Where'z Da' Party At?"
2. "Where'z Da' Party At?" (Mufi's Mix)
3. "Where'z Da' Party At?" (Block Party Mix)
4. "Where'z Da' Party At?" (Tray Wop's Mix)
5. "Where'z Da' Party At?" (Open Mic Mix)
6. "Where'z Da' Party At?" (Instrumental)
7. "Where'z Da' Party At?" (Remix Instrumental)
8. "Where'z Da' Party At?" (There'z A Party Over Here Mix)
9. "Where'z Da' Party At?" (Remix TV)
10. "Where'z Da' Party At?" (Miilk Remix)

== Charts ==
Chart (1995)	Peak position
US Bubbling Under Hot 100 (Billboard)	23
US Hot R&B/Hip-Hop Songs (Billboard)	86
US Hot Rap Songs (Billboard)	26
