= KayGee =

American DJ, rapper and producer

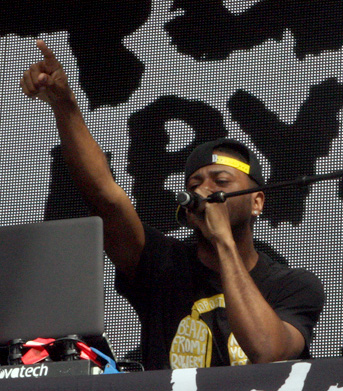
- KayGee in 2012

Background information
- Also known as: DJ Kay Gee
- Born: Keir Lamont Gist; September 15, 1969 (age 56)
- Origin: East Orange, New Jersey, U.S.
- Genres: East Coast hip-hop; R&B
- Occupations: Record producer; disc jockey; rapper
- Instruments: Voice; Mixing console
- Years active: 1986–present
- Labels: Illtown; Divine Mill
- Member of: Naughty by Nature
- Website: KayGee on Twitter

Keir Lamont Gist (born September 15, 1969), better known by his stage name KayGee, is an American DJ, rapper and record producer from East Orange, New Jersey, best known as a member of hip hop trio Naughty by Nature. He has won a Grammy Award for Best Rap Album at the 38th Annual Grammy Awards for Poverty's Paradise (1995). KayGee parted ways with Naughty by Nature in 2000, but rejoined the group in 2006.

In the mid-'90s, Gist created his own R&B-oriented record label, Illtown, which was evolved and developed into Divine Mill, where he discovered and signed acts such as Zhané, Next, Jaheim, Tha' Rayne and Koffee Brown.

== Discography ==
=== Studio albums ===
- Independent Leaders (1989)
- Naughty by Nature (1991)
- 19 Naughty III (1993)
- Poverty's Paradise (1995)
- Nineteen Naughty Nine: Nature's Fury (1999)
- Anthem Inc. (2011)

=== Selected production discography ===
Year	Artist	Album	Track(s)
1991	Queen Latifah	Nature of a Sista'	Latifah's Had It Up to Here; One Mo' Time
1991	D-Nice	To tha Rescue	Time to Flow/ Time to Flow (Remix) [feat. Naughty By Nature]
1991	Naughty By Nature	Juice (soundtrack)	Uptown Anthem
1992	Eazy-E	5150: Home 4 tha Sick	Only If You Want It
1993	Naughty By Nature	Poetic Justice (soundtrack)	Poor Man's Poetry
1993	Da Youngsta's	The Aftermath	Handle This
1993	Da Youngsta's	The Aftermath	Crewz Pop (feat. Naughty By Nature)
1993	Run-DMC	Down with the King	Hit 'Em Hard
1993	Rottin Razkals	Roll wit the Flava	Enough Is Enough
1993	Naughty By Nature	Roll wit the Flava	Bring It On
1993	Zhané	Roll wit the Flava	Hey Mr. DJ
1993	Queen Latifah	Black Reign	No Work; Weekend Love; U.N.I.T.Y.
1994	Zhané	Pronounced Jah-Nay	Album except 9, 12
1994	Kronic	Da 4 Foot Attack EP	Carry On
1995	Rottin Razkals	Rottin ta da Core	Album
1995	Michael Jackson	Scream 12"	Scream (Naughty Edit)
1995	Miilkbone	Da' Miilkrate	Set It Off; Where's da Party At?
1995	Shabba Ranks	A Mi Shabba	Ice Cream Love
1996	Eazy-E	Str8 off tha Streetz of Muthaphukkin Compton	Nutz on Ya Chin; Hit the Hookah
1996	Aaliyah	One in a Million	A Girl Like You (feat. Treach)
1996	Aaliyah	Sunset Park (soundtrack)	Are You Ready?
1996	Monica	The Nutty Professor (soundtrack)	Ain't Nobody (feat. Treach)
1996	The Almighty RSO	Doomsday: Forever RSO	Keep Alive
1997	The Notorious B.I.G.	Life After Death	Miss U (feat. 112)
1997	Naughty By Nature	Nothing to Lose (soundtrack)	Nothin' to Lose (Naughty Live)
1997	Zhane	Saturday Night	Request Line; So Badd; Crush; Last Chance; Good Times
1997	Next	Rated Next	Most of album
1998	Naughty By Nature, MaG	Butter (soundtrack)	Work
1998	Deborah Cox	One Wish	It's Over Now; September (Remix)
1998	Next & Big Pun	Slam (soundtrack)	Sex, Money & Thugs
1998	Queen Latifah	Order in the Court	Black on Black Love; Life
1998	Pat Benatar & Queen Latifah	Small Soldiers (soundtrack)	"Love Is a Battlefield (Remix)"
1999	Krayzie Bone	Thug Mentality 1999	When I Die
1999	Calvin Richardson, Monifah	Country Boy	Close My Eyes
1999	Will Smith	Willennium	Da Butta
1999	Road Dawgz	Don't Be Saprize	Road Dawgs
2000	Jaheim	Bait (soundtrack)	Remarkable
2000	Funkmaster Flex, Faith Evan	The Mix Tape Vol. 4	Goodlife
2001	Bone Thugs-n-Harmony	Down to Earth (soundtrack)	Thug Music Plays On
2001	Luther Vandross	Luther Vandross	Bring Your Heart to Mine
2002	Elias Farah	Red Star Sounds Vol. 2	Impossible
2003	Luther Vandross, Busta Rhymes	Dance with My Father	Lovely Day Pt. II
2005	Syleena Johnson	Chapter 3: The Flesh	More; Apartment for Rent; Only a Woman
2021	AZ, Jaheim	Doe or Die 2	The Wheel

List of albums, contains songs produced by KayGee
Year	Artist	Album
1993	Run-DMC	Down with the King
1993	Queen Latifah	Black Reign
1994	Zhané	Pronounced Jah-Nay
1995	Rottin Razkals	Rottin ta da Core
1995	Miilkbone	Da' Miilkrate
1996	The Almighty RSO	Doomsday: Forever RSO
1996	Aaliyah	One in a Million
1997	The Notorious B.I.G.	Life After Death
1997	Zhané	Saturday Night
1997	Next	Rated Next
1998	Queen Latifah	Order in the Court
1998	Deborah Cox	One Wish
1999	Krayzie Bone	Thug Mentality 1999
1999	Will Smith	Willennium
1999	Road Dawgs	Don't Be Saprize
2000	Next	Welcome II Nextasy
2000	Funkmaster Flex	60 Minutes of Funk, Volume IV: The Mixtape
2001	Jaheim	Ghetto Love
2001	Koffee Brown	Mars/Venus
2001	Coo Coo Cal	Disturbed
2001	Allure	Sunny Days
2001	Luther Vandross	Luther Vandross
2002	Jaheim	Still Ghetto
2002	Next	The Next Episode
2002	Shade Sheist	Informal Introduction
2002	RL	RL: Ements
2003	Mary J. Blige	Love & Life
2005	Syleena Johnson	Chapter 3: The Flesh
2005	Charlie Wilson	Charlie, Last Name Wilson
2006	Stacie Orrico	Beautiful Awakening
2006	CL Smooth	American Me
2006	Brooke Hogan	Undiscovered
2007	Rick Ross	Rise to Power
2007	Jaheim	The Makings of a Man
2009	Marié Digby	Breathing Underwater
2011	Ledisi	Pieces of Me
2013	Jaheim	Appreciation Day
2017	Bell Biv DeVoe	Three Stripes
2019	Angie Stone	Full Circle

List of singles, produced by KayGee
Year	Title	Artist
1993	"U.N.I.T.Y."	Queen Latifah
1997	"Too Close"	Next
1995	"Where'z Da' Party At ?"	Miilkbone
2000	"Wifey"	Next
2000	"Whatever"	Ideal
2000	"Where I Wanna Be"	Shade Sheist, Nate Dogg, Kurupt
2002	"Fabulous"	Jaheim, Tha' Rayne
2004	"Where Were You?"	Urban Mystic
2005	"Everytime I Think about Her"	Jaheim
2006	"I'm Not Missing You"	Stacie Orrico
2009	"Ain't Leavin Without You"	Jaheim

== Awards and nominations ==
Year	Nominee / work	Award	Result	Ref.
1995	Poverty's Paradise	Grammy Award for Best Rap Album	Won	
1995	"Feel Me Flow"	Grammy Award for Best Rap Performance by a Duo or Group	Nominated	
1993	"Hip Hop Hooray"	Grammy Award for Best Rap Performance by a Duo or Group	Nominated	
1991	"O.P.P."	Grammy Award for Best Rap Performance by a Duo or Group	Nominated	
