= Damizza Presents Where I Wanna Be =

Damizza Presents... Where I Wanna Be

Compilation album by various artists
- Released: October 31, 2000
- Genres: Hip hop; R&B
- Length: 38:45
- Label: London
- Producers: Damizza (also exec.); Eddie Berkeley; Jermaine Dupri; KayGee; Warren G

Singles from Damizza Presents... Where I Wanna Be
- 1. "Where I Wanna Be" Released: December 12, 2000

Professional ratings
Review scores
Source	Rating
AllMusic	2.5/5 stars

Damizza Presents... Where I Wanna Be is a compilation album presented by American record producer Damizza. It was released on October 31, 2000 through London Records. Production was handled by Eddie Berkeley, Jermaine Dupri, KayGee, Warren G, and Damizza himself, who also served as executive producer together with co-executive producers Rick Cummings, Shade Sheist and Sujit Kundu. It features contributions from Shade Sheist, Damon Sharpe, Krayzie Bone, TQ, Big Caz, Ja Rule, Kurupt, Layzie Bone, Nate Dogg, Tatum Tots and Damizza. The album peaked at number 143 on the Billboard 200 and number 28 on the Top R&B/Hip-Hop Albums in the United States.

== Track listing ==
No.	Title	Producer(s)	Length
1.	"Uncle Carmine's BDS (Interlude)" (performed by Damizza)	Damizza	0:23
2.	"Where I Wanna Be" (performed by Shade Sheist, Nate Dogg and Kurupt)	Eddie Berkeley; KayGee; Damizza (co.)	4:16
3.	"Bling Diamante (Interlude)" (performed by Damizza)	Damizza	0:12
4.	"Is It Me?" (performed by Damon Sharpe and Krayzie Bone)	Damizza	3:16
5.	"If You Were Mine" (performed by Shade Sheist and Tatum Tots)	Damizza	4:26
6.	"Have a Nice Day" (performed by Caz, Shade Sheist and Damizza)	Damizza	2:09
7.	"Life Ain't a Game" (performed by Ja Rule)	Damizza	3:37
8.	"Let Me Do My Thang" (performed by Damon Sharpe)	Damizza	3:45
9.	"Used To" (performed by TQ)	Damizza	5:02
10.	"Lord What Have I Done?" (performed by Krayzie Bone, Layzie Bone and Shade Sheist)	Damizza	4:22
11.	"Get Ur Head out Your Ass Playboy" (performed by Shade Sheist)	Jermaine Dupri	3:36
12.	"Bounce" (performed by Shade Sheist and TQ)	Warren G	3:41
Total length:			38:45

== Charts ==
Chart (2000)	Peak position
US Billboard 200	143
US Top R&B/Hip-Hop Albums (Billboard)	28
