= Mars/Venus =

Studio album by Koffee Brown
- Released: March 6, 2001
- Recorded: 1999–2000
- Studio: Battery Studios (New York); Da Mill Studios (New Jersey); Head Up Recording (New Jersey)
- Genre: R&B
- Length: 52:59
- Label: Arista
- Producer: Aarian Pope; AllStar; Barry Salter; Chris Liggio; Darren Lighty; Eddie Berkeley; Falonte Moore; KayGee; muMs; Rob Fusari; The Bankers

Singles from Mars/Venus
- 1. "After Party" Released: November 7, 2000; 2. "Weekend Thing" Released: June 19, 2001

Professional ratings
Review scores
| Source | Rating |
|---|---|
| AllMusic | 3/5 stars |
| NME | 4/5 stars |

Mars/Venus is the only studio album by American contemporary R&B duo Koffee Brown. It was released on March 6, 2001, through Arista Records. Recording sessions took place at Battery Studios in New York and at Da Mill Studios and Head Up Recording in New Jersey. Production was handled by DJ Kay Gee, Falonte Moore, Eddie Berkeley, Chris Liggio, Darren Lighty, Rob Fusari, Aarian Pope, AllStar, Barry Salter, muMs and The Bankers. It features guest appearances from Duganz Shanlont, Brandon "B-12" Daniel, Lady Luck, Balewa Muhammad, Lil' Mo, Mr. Deyo, Next and Que.

The album was a moderate success, reaching number 32 on the US Billboard 200, though it found greater success on the Billboard's Top R&B/Hip-Hop Albums, where it peaked at No. 7. The album's lead single "After Party" also found success on the U.S. charts, peaking at 44 on the Billboard Hot 100. Despite success with both the single and album, Koffee Brown disbanded shortly after the album's release.

== Track listing ==
| No. | Title | Writer(s) | Producer(s) | Length |
|---|---|---|---|---|
| 1. | "Intro" | Keir Gist; Falonte Moore; Rob Fusari; Mums; Aarian Pope; Perry Botkin, Jr.; Barry DeVorzon | KayGee; Falonte Moore; Rob Fusari | 0:25 |
| 2. | "Weekend Thing" (featuring B-12) | Gist; Darren Lighty; Robert Lavelle Huggar; Brandon Daniel; Andy Armer; Randy Alpert | KayGee; Darren Lighty | 3:23 |
| 3. | "After Party" | Allen Gordon; Teron Beal; Willieque Gilchrist; Nathan Butler; Eritza Laues; Joel Campbell | Allstar; Teron Beal (voc.) | 3:34 |
| 4. | "Didn't Mean to Turn You On" (featuring Du-Ganz) | Gist; L. Summerville; D. Sanders; Beal; D. Youngblood; Vernell Sales | KayGee; The Bankers | 4:13 |
| 5. | "Chick on da Side" (featuring Balewa Muhammad) | Gist; Moore; Balewa Muhammad; David Aaron; Clifton Lighty | KayGee; Falonte Moore | 3:56 |
| 6. | "Fingerpointing" | Moore; Fusari; Muhammad; C. Lighty | Falonte Moore; Rob Fusari | 4:24 |
| 7. | "Blackout" (featuring Lady Luck) | Gist; Eddie Berkeley; Muhammad; C. Lighty; Shanell Jones | KayGee; Eddie Berkeley | 4:02 |
| 8. | "All I Need (Bonnie and Clyde)" (featuring Du-Ganz and Balewa Muhammad) | Gist; Berkeley; Muhammad; C. Lighty; Youngblood; Stanley Clarke | KayGee; Eddie Berkeley | 3:36 |
| 9. | "All Those Fancy Things" (featuring Lil' Mo) | Barry Salter; Jules Bartholomew; Cynthia Loving | Barry Salter; Jules Bartholomew (co.) | 3:34 |
| 10. | "Quickie" (featuring Balewa Muhammad and Cliff Lighty) | Gist; Chris Liggio; Muhammad; Sales; C. Lighty; Frank Romano | KayGee; Chris "C.L." Liggio | 3:54 |
| 11. | "The View (Interlude)" | Gist | KayGee | 1:46 |
| 12. | "I Got Love (Scars)" (featuring Mr. Deyo) | Liggio; Andre Nathaniel Deyo | Chris "C.L." Liggio | 3:07 |
| 13. | "Hater's Disease" | Gist; Moore; Ernest Dixon | KayGee; Falonte Moore | 4:13 |
| 14. | "Qualified" | Gist; Berkeley; Muhammad; C. Lighty; Juanita Carter | KayGee; Eddie Berkeley | 3:52 |
| 15. | "Mars/Venus (Interlude)" | Gist; Mums; Pope | KayGee; muMs; Aarian Pope | 1:12 |
| 16. | "Do U See" | Gist; D. Lighty; Huggar | KayGee; Darren Lighty | 3:48 |
| Total length: | | | | 52:59 |

== Personnel ==
- Vernell "Vee" Sales – vocals
- Falonte "Fonz" Moore – vocals, producer (tracks: 1, 5, 6, 13)
- Brandon "B-12" Daniel – vocals (track 2)
- Next – additional backing vocals (track 3)
- Que – additional backing vocals (track 3)
- Duganz Shanlont – vocals (tracks: 4, 8)
- Balewa Muhammad – backing vocals (tracks: 5, 8, 10)
- Shanell "Lady Luck" Jones – vocals (track 7)
- Cynthia "Lil' Mo" Loving – backing vocals (track 9)
- Cliff Lighty – backing vocals (track 10)
- Andre Deyo – backing vocals (track 12)
- Frank Romano – guitar (track 10)
- Eddie Kuri – additional guitar (track 12)
- Keir "DJ KayGee" Gist – producer (tracks: 1, 2, 4, 5, 7, 8, 10, 11, 13–16)
- Rob Fusari – producer (tracks: 1, 6)
- Darren Lighty – producer (tracks: 2, 16)
- Allen "Allstar" Gordon – producer (track 3)
- The Bankers – producers (track 4)
- Eddie Berkeley – producer (tracks: 7, 8, 14)
- Barry Salter – producer (track 9)
- Chris Liggio – producer (tracks: 10, 12)
- muMs – producer (track 15)
- Aarian Pope – producer (track 15)
- Teron Beal – vocal producer (track 3)
- Jules Bartholomew – co-producer (track 9)
- Andy Blakelock – engineering, mixing
- Adam Kudzin – engineering, mixing
- Angelo Quaglia – engineering
- Eric Schlotzer – engineering
- Shane Stoneback – engineering
- Dave Kutch – mastering
- Christopher Stern – art direction

== Charts ==
| Chart (2001) | Peak position |
|---|---|
| UK R&B Albums (OCC) | 33 |
| US Billboard 200 | 32 |
| US Top R&B/Hip-Hop Albums (Billboard) | 7 |
