= Get Gone =

Single by Ideal

from the album Ideal
- Released: July 13, 1999
- Genre: Contemporary R&B
- Label: Virgin
- Songwriters: Johntá Austin; Bryan Michael Paul Cox; Kevin Darrell Hicks
- Producers: Bryan-Michael Cox; Kevin Hicks

Ideal singles chronology
"Inner City Blues (Make Me Wanna Holler)" (1996)	"Get Gone" (1999)	"Creep Inn" (1999)

Music video
- "Get Gone" on YouTube

"Get Gone" is a song by American R&B quartet Ideal, released on July 13, 1999 through Virgin Records as the lead single from the group's eponymous debut studio album Ideal. It was written by Johntá Austin, Bryan-Michael Cox and Kevin Hicks, and produced by the latter two. The single reached number 13 on the Billboard Hot 100, number 35 on the Radio Songs, and number two on both the Hot R&B/Hip-Hop Songs and the R&B/Hip-Hop Airplay charts in the United States. It also made it to number 76 on the UK Singles Chart and number 11 on the UK Hip Hop and R&B Singles Chart. It was certified Gold by the Recording Industry Association of America on November 12, 1999 for selling 500,000 copies in the United States. Music video was directed by Tim Story.

== Track listing ==
US CD single
No.	Title	Length
1.	"Get Gone" (Radio Version)	4:38
2.	"Get Gone" (Extended Version)	4:54
3.	"Get Gone" (Instrumental)	4:36

UK CD single
No.	Title	Producer(s)	Length
1.	"Get Gone" (UK Radio Edit)	Bryan-Michael Cox; Kevin Hicks	4:12
2.	"Get Gone (Bounce Remix)" (remixed by Jazze Pha)	Bryan-Michael Cox; Kevin Hicks	4:54
3.	"Get Gone" (Ghetto Remix Version)	Teddy Bishop	4:51

== Charts ==
Chart (1999–2000)	Peak position
UK Singles (Official Charts)	76
UK Hip Hop/R&B (Official Charts)	11
US Billboard Hot 100	13
US Hot R&B/Hip-Hop Songs (Billboard)	2
US R&B/Hip-Hop Airplay (Billboard)	2

== Certifications ==
Region	Certification	Certified units/sales
United States (RIAA)	Gold	500,000^{^}
^{^} Shipments figures based on certification alone.
