= U Got Miilk? =

U Got Miilk ?

Studio album by Miilkbone
- Released: April 17, 2001
- Recorded: 2000–2001; The Cellar, XCaliber Music Studio: (New Jersey), The Hit Factory: (New York City)
- Genre: Hip hop
- Length: 54:53
- Label: Xcaliber, Lightyear Entertainment
- Producer: A.D., Big Joe, Chop Diesel, D.O., Gilbert Keys (co-exec.), John B., Nick Wiz, Steve Bortugno (co-exec.), Willie Banks (co-exec.), Laurence "Woo" Allen

Miilkbone chronology
Da' Miilkrate (1995)	U Got Miilk ? (2001)	The Voice of Reason (2015)

Singles from U Got Miilk ?
- 1. "Yes Yes Y'all" Released: March 13, 2001; 2. "Dear Slim" Released: March 13, 2001; 3. "Yesterday" Released: April 17, 2001; 4. "A Few Good Men" Released: May 1, 2001

Professional ratings
Review scores
Source	Rating
AllMusic	1.5/5 stars
Billboard	Unfavorable
RapReviews	4.5/10
The Source	2.5/5 stars
XXL	S (1/5)

U Got Miilk ? is the second studio album by American rapper Miilkbone, released on April 17, 2001, by XCaliber Entertainment and Lightyear Entertainment. The album generated three noncharting singles in "Yes Yes Y'all", "Dear Slim", and "A Few Good Men". "Dear Slim" attacked rapper Eminem, who had dissed Miilkbone on his 1998 track "Just Don't Give a Fuck".

Miilkbone dropped out of the public eye after the album's release, until resuming his career in 2013.

== Track listing ==
No.	Title	Producer(s)	Length
1.	"Skit"		0:35
2.	"Intro"		1:45
3.	"Sex, Money, Drugs, Cars"	Nick Wiz	3:17
4.	"Yes Yes Y'all"	Big Joe	3:37
5.	"Why U Hate"	Gilbert Keys	3:38
6.	"Take This Ride" (Danielle Jordan)	John B.	3:49
7.	"Enemy Of State"	A.D.	2:38
8.	"A Few Good Men]" (Tame One, Chop Diesel, K Banger)	Chop Diesel	3:30
9.	"War Fair" (Culture)	D.O	4:03
10.	"Lesson 1:1" (Triple Beam)	Gilbert Keys	3:39
11.	"Dear Slim" (D.O.)		4:14
12.	"Yesterday" (Carmen)	John B.	4:44
13.	"Things You Do" (Sherrae Spencer)	Woo	3:33
14.	"HA HA HA"	Woo	3:33
15.	"I Think So" (Flame Spitta)	Woo	3:45
16.	"Goodbye" (James Bennett (Guitar))	Woo	4:35
17.	"Outro"	Woo	1:21
