= Dr. Dolittle 2 =

2001 film by Steve Carr

- Theatrical release poster
- Directed by: Steve Carr
- Written by: Larry Levin
- Based on: Doctor Dolittle by Hugh Lofting
- Produced by: John Davis
- Starring: Eddie Murphy; Kristen Wilson; Jeffrey Jones; Kevin Pollak
- Narrated by: Norm Macdonald
- Cinematography: Daryn Okada
- Edited by: Craig Herring
- Music by: David Newman
- Production company: Davis Entertainment
- Distributed by: 20th Century Fox
- Release date: June 22, 2001
- Running time: 87 minutes
- Country: United States
- Language: English
- Budget: $70 million
- Box office: $176.1 million

Dr. Dolittle 2 is a 2001 American fantasy comedy film and a sequel to the 1998 film Dr. Dolittle. It was written by Larry Levin, one of the co-writers of Dr. Dolittle, and directed by Steve Carr. The film stars Eddie Murphy in the title role of Dr. John Dolittle, Kristen Wilson, Jeffrey Jones, and Kevin Pollak (in a dual role).

It tells the story of Dr. Dolittle as he tries to help the animals protect their forest from unscrupulous human developers. He decides to populate the forest with a species of animal that the law protects, and enlists the help of Ava (voiced by Lisa Kudrow), a lone Pacific western bear living in the condemned forest. To provide her with a mate, Dolittle turns to Archie (voiced by Steve Zahn), a wise-cracking circus-performing bear.

Dr. Dolittle 2 was released by 20th Century Fox on June 22, 2001. The film received mixed reviews from critics and grossed $176.1 million against a $70 million budget. This is the last Dr. Dolittle film to feature Eddie Murphy in the lead role, before Kyla Pratt assumed the lead role in future films, starting with Dr. Dolittle 3 in 2006. It is also the last Dr. Dolittle film to feature Raven-Symoné as Charisse Dolittle.

== Plot ==
Three years after the events of the first film, veterinarian Dr. John Dolittle's ability to talk to animals has made him famous, and he travels the world performing his skills. Returning home from France, he gives his younger daughter Maya a chameleon named Pepito, and grounds his eldest daughter Charisse for doing poorly in school, confiscating her phone for a week. Charisse's boyfriend Eric joins the family for the former's 16th birthday party, where an opossum and a raccoon named Joey tell John that their boss, the Godbeaver (Godfather of the rodent mafia), wants to see him. John meets the Godbeaver and agrees to save a forest from being cut down by mating an endangered female Pacific western bear with a male.

At a circus, John persuades Archie, the sole surviving Pacific western male, to accompany him to the forest and become a real bear. John takes his family on a month-long vacation to the forest, where he makes a deal with the sole surviving Pacific western female bear named Ava, who is involved with a male Kodiak bear named Sonny. She agrees not to make any decisions for a month after John promises to turn Archie into a bear she will love.

Struggling to train Archie, who is used to the pampered lifestyle, John hires the local forest creatures to chaperone Charisse and Eric, and neglects his wife Lisa. After assuring Archie that he will find a way to win Ava's heart, John attempts to win Lisa back by dancing in their cabin, with every animal in the forest watching, but Lucky the dog accidentally ruins it.

Archie attempts to get Ava's attention by imitating John singing, but falls from a tree branch. Humiliated, he refuses to leave his new-found cave, but becomes frustrated with John's insults and knocks him into a muddy hole, finally listening to his "inner bear". Later, Archie spends the day with Ava, whose relationship with Sonny is declining. Lucky tries to woo a female wolf, successfully urinating around her territory, but is interrupted by one of her packmates before she agrees to go out with him. Meanwhile, Sonny forces Ava to leave Archie.

Logging magnate Joseph Potter and his lawyer Jack Riley attempt to make a deal with John to spare some parts of the forest, until Archie tells John he has prepared his "big finish" to win Ava and goes after a beehive at the edge of a tall hill, ignoring John's warnings and the attacking bees who also attack a nearby Riley. He manages to get the hive, finally winning Ava's heart and the respect of the other forest animals. Ava then dumps Sonny, finally having had enough of his rudeness to Archie.

In a game of hide and seek with Ava, Archie is tranquilized by Riley. John learns that Archie had somewhat destroyed the back of a restaurant. After getting information from a weasel, John visits Archie in jail, telling him that he may be too dangerous to go free and will be sold to a Mexican circus, ending John's chance of saving the forest. His determination is quickly reignited, however, when John realizes that Charisse has developed her father's gift of talking to animals. He rallies the animals of the forest not to give up without a fight and free Archie. Charisse, Eric, and Maya rebel against the loggers with the aid of wolves, while word of Archie's predicament spreads, leading animals around the world to go on strike.

At Potter Wood Industries, Mr. Potter and Riley are attacked by the animals. While Riley takes the brunt from the birds, wolves, and bees, Mr. Potter is cornered by Ava and Joey, forcing him to finally start negotiating with John and the animals. As the negotiations go on, the strike continues to grow with several animal pros like race horses and Shamu getting in on the act. Finally, a deal is made and the Dolittles and animals accept, freeing Archie and saving the entire forest outside San Francisco.

John and Charisse become closer, talking with and helping animals together, while Archie and Ava mate and have two cubs who try to take after their father.

== Cast ==
- Eddie Murphy as Dr. John Dolittle, a doctor who can talk to animals.
- Kristen Wilson as Lisa Dolittle, the wife of John.
- Jeffrey Jones as Joseph "Joe" Potter, a logging magnate and head of Potter Wood Industries.
- Kevin Pollak as Jack Riley, Potter's lawyer.
- Raven-Symoné as Charisse Dolittle, the elder daughter of John who later learns to talk to animals.
- Kyla Pratt as Maya Dolittle, the younger daughter of John.
- Lil Zane as Eric "Biggie Mac", Charisse's boyfriend and pizza delivery man.
- James Avery as Eldon, Eric's father.
- Elayn J. Taylor as Eldon's wife
- Andy Richter as Eugene Wilson
- Mark Griffin as Logger
  - Mark Griffin also voices the Nature Show Narrator
- Ken Hudson Campbell as Animal Control Officer
- Victor Raider-Wexler as Judge B. Duff, a judge who oversees the cases involving Dolittle and Potter.
- Steve Irwin as The Crocodile Hunter, John once went with him on one of his nature documentaries.
- Anne Stedman as Woman
- Googy Gress as Bear Announcer
- Trevor Denman as Horse Race Announcer
- Lawrence Pressman as Governor of California (uncredited)

=== Voice cast ===
Actor	Role	Animal
Steve Zahn	Archie	Pacific western bear (fictional); Grizzly bear (portrayer)
Norm Macdonald	Lucky Dolittle	Mongrel
Lisa Kudrow	Ava	Pacific western bear (fictional); Grizzly bear (portrayer)
Mike Epps (as Michael J. Epps)	Sonny	Kodiak bear
Jacob Vargas	Pepito	Chameleon
Richard C. Sarafian	God Beaver	God Beaver
Michael Rapaport	Joey	Raccoon
Phil Proctor	Drunk Monkey	Monkey
Isaac Hayes	Possum	Opossum
Andy Dick	Mr. "Lennie" Weasel	Weasel (film); Ferret (portrayer)
John Witherspoon	Old Zoo Bear	Old Zoo Bear
Cedric the Entertainer	Young Zoo Bear	Young Zoo Bear
Jamie Kennedy, David Cross & Bob Odenkirk	Sheep Dog, Hound Dog & Pug	Sheep Dog, Hound Dog & Pug
Maria Arcé & Melique Berger	Fish	Fish
David DeLuise & Hal Sparks	School of Fish	School of Fish
Reni Santoni	Rat #1	
John Leguizamo	Rat #2	
Kevin Pollak	Alligator	Alligator
Georgia Engel	Giraffe	Giraffe
Joey Lauren Adams	Squirrel	Squirrel
Mandy Moore	Girl Bear Cub	Pacific western bear (fictional); Grizzly bear (portrayer)
Frankie Muniz	Boy Bear Cub	Pacific western bear (fictional); Grizzly bear (portrayer)
Michael McKean & David L. Lander	Birds	Birds
Tom Kenny	Male Tortoise	Male Tortoise
Renée Taylor	Female Tortoise	Female Tortoise
Jamie Kennedy	Bandit	Mongrel
Keone Young & Clyde Kusatsu	Bee #1 & Bee #2	
Tara Mercurio	Deer	Deer
John DiMaggio	Seeing-Eye Dog	Seeing-Eye Dog
John DiMaggio	Wassup Fish	Wassup Fish
John DiMaggio	Mouse	Mouse
Jamie Kennedy, David Cross, Ken Hudson Campbell & Bob Odenkirk	Animal Groupies	Hawk, Owl, Porcupine & Skunk
Ken Hudson Campbell, Jamie Kennedy & Bob Odenkirk	Forest Animals	Rabbit, Crow & Hawk
Arnold Schwarzenegger	White wolf	White wolf

=== Animal cast ===
- Tank the Bear as Archie
- Little Bart the Bear as Boy Bear Cub
- Honey-Bump Bear as Girl Bear Cub
- Crystal the Monkey as Drunk Monkey

== Music ==
=== Soundtrack ===
Dr. Dolittle 2

Soundtrack album by Various artists
- Released: June 5, 2001
- Recorded: 2001
- Genres: Hip-hop, R&B
- Labels: J Records; Fox Music

Singles from Dr. Dolittle 2
- 1. "Do U Wanna Roll (Dolittle Theme)" Released: 2001; 2. "Cluck Cluck" Released: 2001; 3. "Absolutely Not" Released: 2001; 4. "We Fit Together" Released: October 22, 2001; 5. "Life Is Good" Released: January 15, 2002

A soundtrack containing hip-hop and R&B music was released on June 5, 2001, by J Records and Fox Music. It peaked at 76 on the Billboard 200, 26 on the Top R&B/Hip-Hop Albums, and 10 on the Top Soundtracks chart. Five singles were spawned from the album, "Do U Wanna Roll (Dolittle Theme)" by R.L., Snoop Dogg and Lil' Kim, "Cluck Cluck" by The Product G&B with Wyclef Jean, "Absolutely Not" by Deborah Cox, "We Fit Together" by O-Town and "Life Is Good" by LFO with M.O.P. AllMusic rated this soundtrack four stars out of five.

Information taken from Dr. Dolittle 2: Original Soundtrack liner notes:

No.	Title	Writer(s)	Producer(s)	Length
1.	"Cluck Cluck" (The Product G&B with Wyclef Jean)	Wyclef Jean, Jerry "Wonder" Duplessis, David McRae, Marvin L. Moore-Hough	Wyclef Jean and Jerry "Wonder" Duplessis	3:59
2.	"Do U Wanna Roll (Dolittle Theme)" (R.L., Snoop Dogg and Lil' Kim)	Kevin Gilliam, R.L. Huggar, Calvin Broadus, Kimberly Jones, Roger Troutman, Larry Troutman	Battlecat for B.C. Pow-Da, Inc./Future Sound Entertainment	4:33
3.	"Tameeka" (Fabolous with Mario)	Steve Estiverne, Jarret Washington, Carlos McKinney	Steve Estiverne	3:42
4.	"Absolutely Not" (Deborah Cox)	Eric Johnson, D. Christopher Jennings, Deborah Cox, Ahmad Russel, Tiffany Palmer, Eric Jones, James Glasco	Eric "Donovan East" Johnson and D. Christopher "Dip Q" Jennings for Eristopher Entertainment/Furnace Music	3:35
5.	"We Fit Together" (O-Town)	Remee, Mich Hansen, Joe Belmaati	Cutfather and Joe	3:58
6.	"Two Steps" (Jimmy Cozier)	Carsten Shack, Kenneth Karlin, Nate Butler, Harold Lilly, Jimmy Cozier	Soulshock and Karlin for Soulpower Productions	4:17
7.	"What It Is (Part II)" (Flipmode Squad featuring Busta Rhymes with Kelis)	Trevor Smith, Pharrell Williams, Chad Hugo, Rashia Fisher, Roger McNair, William Lewis, Leroy Jones, Rahkeim Meyers, Ricky Walters	The Neptunes	4:20
8.	"Rear View Mirror" (Alicia Keys)	Alicia Keys, LeSean Daniels, Kerry Brothers Jr., Fred Jerkins III, Rodney Jerkins, Paul L. Green	Alicia Keys and K. Brothers for MBK Entertainment/KrucialKey Productions	4:05
9.	"If I Was the One" (Luther Vandross)	Diane Warren	The Underdogs - Damon Thomas and Harvey Mason, Jr.	4:21
10.	"Makin' Me Feel" (Angie Stone)	Raphael Saadiq, Angie Stone, Kelvon Wooten, Glenn Standridge, Robert C. Ozuna	Raphael Saadiq	4:07
11.	"Life Is Good" (LFO with M.O.P.)	Rich Cronin, Sheppard, Kenny Gioia	Sheppard and Kenny Gioia for Sheppard Music, Inc.	4:05
12.	"Lookin' for Love" (Next with Lil' Zane)	R.L. Huggar, Walter Millsap III, Zane Copeland, Jr.	Walter "Little Walt" Millsap III for Conjunction Productions Inc., and R.L. for Uh Oh Productions, Inc.	3:35
13.	"If I Knew" (Glenn Medeiros)	Gen Rubin, Giuliano Franco	Gen Rubin and Giuliano Franco	4:27

Sample credits

- "Do U Wanna Roll (Dolittle Theme)" contains an interpolation of "Doo Wa Ditty (Blow That Thing)" (Roger Troutman, Larry Troutman), performed by Zapp
- "What It Is (Part II)" contains replayed elements from "Children's Story" (Ricky Walters), performed by Slick Rick

Notes

The song "Life Is Good" did not appear in the film.

== Reception ==
=== Box office ===
On its opening weekend, the film grossed $25,037,039 from 3,049 theaters in the United States and Canada, ranking #2 at the box office, behind The Fast and the Furious. Like the first film, it was the best debut for a Fox film that week. In the United Kingdom, it debuted in third place behind Jurassic Park III and Swordfish with $2.2 million during its opening weekend. By the end of its run, Dr. Dolittle 2 had grossed $112,952,899 domestically and $63,151,445 internationally, totaling $176,104,344 worldwide.

=== Critical response ===
Like the 1998 version, Dr Dolittle 2 received mixed reviews from critics. On Rotten Tomatoes, the film has an approval rating of 41% based on reviews from 107 critics, with an average rating of 5.00/10. The site's critics consensus reads: "Although there are laughs to be had in Dr. Dolittle 2, its preoccupation with toilet humor and Murphy's restrained performance makes this a missed opportunity". On Metacritic, the film has a weighted average score of 49 out of 100 based on reviews from 28 critics, indicating "mixed or average" reviews. Audiences surveyed by CinemaScore gave the film a grade "B+" on scale of A to F.

Joe Leydon of Variety said "the film has all the symptoms of a sure-fire smash hit", noting that it was more family-friendly than its predecessor, and that "Eddie Murphy [is] once again in fine form". Eleanor Ringel Cater of Atlanta Journal-Constitution gave it a B+, stating that "it's not as clever as Shrek or as action-packed as Atlantis, but for my money, Dr. Dolittle 2 wins the prize for most charming kid flick of the summer". Roger Ebert of the Chicago Sun-Times gave it 3 out of 4, calling it "cute, crude and good-hearted movie". Rita Kempley of The Washington Post praised Eddie Murphy saying that after having been upstaged by the animals in the first film "brings bite as well as bark to the funnier sequel". Desson Thomson also of The Washington Post did not find the film funny, called it forgettable and thought it should have gone straight to video.

== Home media ==
Dr. Dolittle 2 was released on VHS and DVD on October 23, 2001, by 20th Century Fox Home Entertainment, and generated $7.32 million in its first week in stores.
