= Where I Wanna Be (Shade Sheist song) =

Single by Shade Sheist featuring Nate Dogg and Kurupt

from the album Informal Introduction
- Released: October 7, 2000
- Recorded: June 2000
- Studio: Larrabee West Recording Studios (West Hollywood, CA)
- Genre: West Coast hip hop; G-funk
- Length: 4:25
- Label: MCA
- Songwriter(s): Tramayne Thompson; Nathaniel Hale; Ricardo Brown; Edward Berkeley; Keir Lamont Gist; Robert Kimball; David Paich; Derek Bush; Robert Lavelle Huggar
- Producer(s): Eddie Berkeley; Kay Gee; Damizza (co.)

Shade Sheist singles chronology
"Leaving You Again" (1998)	"Where I Wanna Be" (2000)	"Money Owners" (2002)

Nate Dogg singles chronology
"The Next Episode" (2000)	"Where I Wanna Be" (2000)	"Oh No" (2000)

Kurupt singles chronology
"Girls All Pause" (2000)	"Where I Wanna Be" (2000)	"Behind the Walls" (2001)

Music video
- "Where I Wanna Be" on YouTube

Professional ratings
Review scores
Source	Rating
AllMusic	2.5/5 stars

"Where I Wanna Be" is a song by American hip hop recording artist Shade Sheist featuring Nate Dogg and Kurupt. It was released on October 7, 2000, via MCA Records as the first single from Shade Sheist's debut studio album Informal Introduction. Recording sessions took place at Larrabee West Recording Studios in West Hollywood. Production was handled by Eddie Berkeley and KayGee with Damizza serving as co-producer and presenter.

The single found chart success domestically and internationally, peaking at number 95 on the Billboard Hot 100 in the United States and number 14 on the UK Singles Chart.

== Conception and release ==
Written by Tramayne Thompson (Shade Sheist), Nathaniel Hale (Nate Dogg), Ricardo Brown (Kurupt), Edward Berkeley, Keir Lamont Gist (Kay Gee of Naughty by Nature), Derek Bush and Robert L. Huggar, "Where I Wanna Be" was first featured on the Damizza Presents Where I Wanna Be compilation album, which Shade Sheist and Damizza executive produced. After writing and recording tracks for other artists, television, film and video game soundtracks, Shade Sheist released his debut studio album Informal Introduction in 2002 through MCA Records. "Where I Wanna Be" was released on December 12, 2000, in the United States and in 2001 in the UK as the lead single from the album.

The song contains a sample of Toto's "Waiting for Your Love", written by Robert Kimball and David Paich.

== Critical reception ==
In a mixed review, AllMusic's Dean Carlson gave the song two-and-a-half starts out of five, stating: "Shade Sheist's 'Where I Wanna Be' hoped to resurrect the forgotten art of summer hip-hop. It failed, of course, but in a gallant sort of way... It was from there, with Nate Dogg and Kurupt chasing each other's slow rhymes at the wayside, that 'Where I Wanna Be' eventually became a sort of heat-induced muscle relaxant this side of De La Soul's "A Roller Skating Jam Named "Saturdays"" or Black Eyed Peas' "Magic", if only substituting their pleasantries for suspiciously placed arrogance. It was an unworkable contradiction when it came down to it, but 'Where I Wanna Be' became the number one rap single for four months in America and went on to crack the British Top 20 the following summer".

== Chart performance ==
In the United States, the single made it to number 95 on the Billboard Hot 100, number 49 on the Hot R&B/Hip-Hop Songs, and number 2 on the Hot Rap Songs. It also peaked at number 14 on the UK Singles Chart and number 2 on the UK R&B Singles Chart. It remains Shade Sheist's most commercially successful hit to date.

== Music video ==
The music video, filmed in Los Angeles, California, features cameos by Damizza, TQ, Irv Gotti, Ja Rule, and The D.O.C..

== Formats and track listings ==
CD single

1. "Where I Wanna Be" (Clean Radio Version) - 3:47
2. "Where I Wanna Be" (Original LP Version) - 4:25
3. "Where I Wanna Be" (Dub-a-holics R&B Switch Mix - Clean) - 5:01
4. "Where I Wanna Be" (Video - UK Edit) - 3:47

12" vinyl

Side A

1. "Where I Wanna Be" (Extended Original Version) - 4:51
2. "Where I Wanna Be" (Clean Radio Version) - 3:47

Side B

1. "Where I Wanna Be" (Dub-a-holics R&B Switch Mix - Explicit Version) - 5:01

== Release history ==
Region	Date	Format	Label
(United States)	December 12, 2000	12" vinyl	London
(United Kingdom)	August 21, 2001	12" vinyl, cassette, CD	London

== Charts ==
Chart performance for "Where I Wanna Be"
Chart (2000–2001)	Peak position
UK Singles (OCC)	14
UK Hip Hop/R&B (OCC)	2
US Billboard Hot 100	95
US Hot R&B/Hip-Hop Songs (Billboard)	49
US R&B/Hip-Hop Airplay (Billboard)	41
US Hot Rap Songs (Billboard)	2
US Rhythmic (Billboard)	23
