= Rated Next =

Studio album by Next
- Released: September 30, 1997
- Genre: R&B
- Length: 72:28
- Labels: Divine Mill; Arista
- Producers: Lance Alexander & Prof. T.; Eddie Berkeley; Deedee Gist; Sheldon Goode; Wesley Hodges; KayGee; Darren Lighty; Mufi; Frank Reynolds; Mr. Walt

Next chronology
Rated Next (1997)	Welcome II Nextasy (2000)

Singles from Rated Next
- 1. "Butta Love" Released: August 19, 1997; 2. "Too Close" Released: January 24, 1998; 3. "I Still Love You" Released: July 21, 1998

Rated Next is the debut studio album by American musical group Next. After forming, the trio recorded several songs with record producers Prof. T. and Lance Alexander before catching recording artist and producer Keir "KayGee" Gist of American hip hop trio Naughty by Nature's attention. He signed Next to his record label Divine Mill, with most of Next's debut album being recorded in Gee's in-home recording studio and the remaining was recorded at Ken Johnston's Perfect Pair studio located in East Orange, New Jersey. Rated Next was eventually released on September 30, 1997 in the United States, under Divine Mill and Arista Records.

Upon its release, Rated Next received generally favorable reviews from music critics, though it received negative criticism for the sexual innuendo within the lyrics. The album peaked at number 37 on the Billboard 200 and was certified two times platinum by the Recording Industry Association of America (RIAA). The album spawned three singles: "Butta Love", "Too Close" and "I Still Love You". "Too Close" topped the Billboard Hot 100 and was certified platinum by the RIAA. "Butta Love" and "I Still Love You" peaked within the top 20 on the Billboard Hot 100 and were both certified gold by the RIAA. "Butta Love" was produced by Lance Alexander of the group Lo-Key.

== Conception and recording ==
Next was formed in 1992 by brothers Terrence "T-Low" and Raphael "Tweety" Brown, in addition to Robert "R. L." Huggar. The trio was trained and managed by T-Low's godmother, Ann Nesby, during the group's formation. While performing in Minneapolis, Minnesota, Next collaborated with record producers Prof. T. and Lance Alexander. They began recording music in the Flyte Tyme recording studio. A demo that the trio recorded caught the attention of recording artist and producer Kay Gee of Naughty by Nature. He called Next three days later and signed the group to his Divine Mill record label. Managed by the Flavor Unit, Rated Next was recorded in Gee's in-home recording studio. The trio recorded several songs during this time, including "Phone Sex" and "Sexitude". During a "growth period", Next recorded "Butta Love", in which group member Tweety described as "the difference in the freedom we were feeling".

== Marketing promotion ==
Next released the album's lead single, "Butta Love", in August 1997. According to Arista Records senior vice president of black music Lionel Ridenour, the success of the single "kept growing to the point where we had worked it from July through December". In order to give the group exposure, Arista promoted Next by having them speak in several radio stations and perform on television programs. The album's second single, "Too Close", topped the Billboard Hot 100 and was certified platinum by the RIAA, going on to sell 2.1 million copies. "Butta Love" and "I Still Love You" peaked in the top 20 of the Hot 100 and were certified gold by the RIAA. The two singles sold 900,000 and 700,000 copies, respectively.

=== Singles ===
"Butta Love" was the lead single and was released August 19, 1997. The song charted on the US Billboard Hot 100 at 16 and on the US R&B/Hip-Hop at 4. The second single was "Too Close"; it was released on January 27, 1998. The song charted at 1 on the US Billboard Hot 100 and on the US R&B/Hip-Hop. The final single was "I Still Love You"; it was released July 21, 1998. The song charted on the US Billboard Hot 100 at 14 and on the US R&B/Hip-Hop at 4

== Reception ==
Professional ratings
Review scores
Source	Rating
AllMusic	3/5 stars
Robert Christgau	(2-star Honorable Mention)

Rated Next received generally favorable reviews from music critics. Leo Stanley of Allmusic described the album as "an impressive collection of contemporary hip-hop-influenced urban soul". He felt that the group "may get a little too 'risqué' for some tastes", but stated that the lead singer R. L., was "so smooth and charismatic that he can seduce unwilling listeners". Melanie Mcfarland of The Seattle Times noted that the group "swings between party anthems and tender ballads with a sexy flow" on the album. The album received negative criticism due to the sexual innuendo in the lyrics of the songs. Tweety noted that one review wrote: "Even if Next never made it as singers, they could still make it as exotic dancers." Robert Christgau called the album a collection of "cute pop songs about... their erections and her clitoris".

== Track listing ==
Rated Next track listing
No.	Title	Writer(s)	Producer(s)	Length
1.	"Intro"		KayGee	1:00
2.	"Too Close"	Keir Gist; Darren Lighty; Robert L. Huggar; Robert Ford, Jr.; Denzil Miller; J. B. Moore; Kurtis Walker; Larry Smith	KayGee; Darren Lighty	4:19
3.	"Butta Love"	Lance Alexander; Tony Tolbert; Huggar; Arkeida Clowers; Lighty	KayGee; D. Lighty; Lance Alexander; Prof T.	4:56
4.	"My Place (Interlude)"		KayGee	2:18
5.	"Cozy"	Huggar; Tolbert; Alexander	Alexander; Prof T.	4:10
6.	"Penetration" (with Naughty by Nature)	Gist; Anthony Criss; D. Lighty; Clifton Lighty; Delvis Damon; Kevin Morse; Bobby Robinson	KayGee; D. Lighty	4:32
7.	"You Are My High (Interlude)"	Andrea Smith; Ronnie Wilson; Charlie Wilson	KayGee; Eddie Berkeley; D. Lighty	2:05
8.	"I Still Love You"	Huggar; Raphael Brown; Tolbert; Clowers; D. Lighty; Darnell Bristol; Kenneth Edmonds; Sid Johnson	KayGee; D. Lighty	4:13
9.	"Stop, Drop & Roll"	Clowers; Melvin L. Dinkins; Chuck Davis	KayGee; Mufi; Sheldon "SO" Goode	5:03
10.	"Represent Me"	C. Lighty; Frank Reynolds; Joe Sample; Melvin Lewis; Eric Williams	KayGee; Cliff Lighty; Frank Reynolds; Wesley Hodges	4:31
11.	"Next Experience" (featuring Adina Howard and Castro)	Huggar; Gist; D. Lighty; Wilton Felder	KayGee; D. Lighty	4:57
12.	"Problems" (featuring Koffee Brown)	Walter Dewgarde; Jesse Wiley; William Way; Walker; David Reeves; Darryll Barksdale; C. Lighty	Mr. Walt; KayGee	3:48
13.	"Do You Think About Me"	Huggar; Tolbert; Alexander	Alexander; Prof T.	5:41
14.	"Admit the Rat (Interlude)"		KayGee	1:56
15.	"Sexitude"	Alexander; Tolbert; Kevin Pierce	Alexander; Prof T.	4:31
16.	"Taste So Good"	Alexander; Tolbert	Alexander; Prof T.	5:13
17.	"Phone Sex"	Alexander; Tolbert	Alexander; Prof T.	5:19
18.	"Rock On"	Huggar; Gist; D. Lighty; Dinkins	KayGee; D. Lighty; Mufi	3:56

Sample credits

- "Too Close" contains replayed elements from "X-Mas Rappin'", written by Robert Ford, Jr., Denzil Miller, J. B. Moore, Kurtis Walker, and Larry Smith.
- "Cozy" contains re-sung elements from "Smooth Sailing Tonight", written by Angela Winbush.
- "Penetration" contains:
  - replayed elements from "I Want to Be in the Land of Milk & Honey", written by James Brown, Vicki Anderson, and David Matthews.
  - re-sung elements from "Funky Boy Party", written by Bobby Robinson.
- "I Still Love You" contains re-sung elements from "Two Occasions", written by Darnell Bristol, Kenneth Edmonds, and Sid Johnson.
- "Stop, Drop & Roll" contains replayed elements from "San Francisco Lights", written by Chuck Davis.
- "Represent Me" contains elements from "A Ballad for Joe (Louis)"; written by Joe Sample, Melvin Lewis, Eric Williams; performed by The Crusaders.
- "Next Experience" contains elements from "Covert Action", written by Wilton Felder, performed by The Crusaders.
- "Problems" contains re-sung elements from:
  - "Problems of the World Today", written by Jesse Wiley, William Way, Kurtis Walker, David Reeves, and Darryll Barksdale.
  - "Secret Lovers", written by Wayne Lewis and David Lewis.
- "Sexitude" contains replayed elements from "How Deep Is Your Love", written by Keith Sweat and Teddy Riley.
- "Rock On" contains replayed elements from "My Kinda Girl", written by Gerald Levert and Edwin Nicholas.

== Personnel ==
As credits listed on AllMusic.

- Lance Alexander – engineer (5, 15, 17), mixing (13, 16, 17)
- Michael Benabib – photography
- Marcus Blassingame – stylist
- Koffee Brown – additional vocals (2), background vocals (11)
- Mike Campbell – guitar (5)
- Ian Dalsemer – assistant engineer (13)
- Clive Davis – executive producer
- Chris Gehringer – mastering
- Deedee Gist – associate producer
- Sheldon "SO" Goode – engineer (9)
- Anthony Harrison, Jr. – art direction
- Carlton "Black Bones" Hitchcock – engineer (5)
- Ken Johnston – engineer (3, 5, 6, 8, 10, 13, 16)
- Kay Gee – engineer (2, 12, 18), mixing (2, 3, 5, 6, 8-11, 13, 15-18), executive producer
- Lamar Kronick – vocoder (12)
- Darren Lighty – engineer (2, 18)
- Mike T. – mixing (5)
- Next – background vocals (3, 15, 16)
- Kevin Pierce – guitar (15, 17)
- Angela Piva – engineer (9, 11, 15), mixing (2, 3, 6, 8-11, 13, 15-18)
- Prof. T. – engineer (3, 5, 13, 16, 17), background vocals (3, 15, 16)
- Andy Salas – assistant mix engineer (17)
- Vernell Sales – background vocals (3)
- Duganz Shalont – rap vocals (18)
- Steve Sola – assistant mix engineer (6)
- Kieran Walsh – mixing (12)
- Charm Warren – associate producer

== Charts ==
=== Weekly charts ===
Weekly chart performance for Rated Next
Chart (1997–1999)	Peak position
Australian Albums (ARIA)	57
Canadian Albums (Billboard)	20
US Billboard 200	37
US Top R&B/Hip-Hop Albums (Billboard)	13

=== Year-end charts ===
1997 year-end chart performance for Rated Next
Chart (1997)	Position
US Hot R&B/Hip-Hop Songs (Billboard)	41

1998 year-end chart performance for Rated Next
Chart (1998)	Position
US Billboard 200	79
US Top R&B/Hip-Hop Albums (Billboard)	35

== Certifications ==
Certifications for Rated Next
Region	Certification	Certified units/sales
Canada (Music Canada)	Gold	50,000^{^}
United States (RIAA)	2× Platinum	2,000,000^{^}
^{^} Shipments figures based on certification alone.
