= Falonte Moore =

American singer, songwriter, producer

- Also known as: Fonz
- Born: Howardville, Missouri, United States
- Genres: R&B; pop; soul; hip-hop
- Occupations: Singer; songwriter; producer
- Label: Arista Records

Falonte Moore, also known as "Fonz", is an American singer, songwriter, and producer, best known for writing and producing Destiny's Child's "Bootylicious". Moore began his career as one part of R&B/Neo-Soul duo Koffee Brown, releasing 2001 project Mars/Venus signed to Arista Records. The group disbanded after the release of their album, and Moore moved into songwriting and production for other artists, frequently working alongside producer Rob Fusari.

== Songwriting and production credits ==
Credits are courtesy of Discogs, Genius, Apple Music, and AllMusic.

Title	Year	Artist	Album
"I'll Do It"	1996	Tha Dogg Pound & Kausion	Supercop (soundtrack)
"I'm Comin'" (Featuring Tra-Knox)	1999	Will Smith	Willennium
"When I Die" (Featuring Fat Joe, Big Pun & Cuban Link)	1999	Krayzie Bone	Thug Mentality 1999
"Welcome II Nextasy (Intro)"	2000	Next	Welcome II Nextasy
"Splash"	2000	Next	Welcome II Nextasy
"2 Can Play That Game"	2000	Sygnature	Bring It On (Soundtrack)
"I Can Tell"	2000	Monifah	Home
"Anything" (Featuring Next)	2000	Jaheim	Ghetto Love
"For Moms"	2000	Jaheim	Ghetto Love
"Angel"	2001	Kelly Rowland	Down to Earth (soundtrack)
"Bootylicious"	2001	Destiny's Child	Survivor
"Apple Pie à la Mode"	2001	Destiny's Child	Survivor
"Happy Face"	2001	Destiny's Child	Survivor
"Winter Paradise"	2001	Destiny's Child	8 Days of Christmas
"A "DC" Christmas Medley"	2001	Destiny's Child	8 Days of Christmas
"Joke's on You"	2001	Willa Ford	Willa Was Here
"Off The Meter"	2001	The Transitions	Back In Da Days
"Bootylicious (Rockwilder Remix)" (Featuring Missy Elliott)	2002	Destiny's Child	This Is the Remix
"This Goes Out"	2002	3LW	A Girl Can Mack
"Past 12"	2002	Kelly Rowland	Simply Deep
"I'm Serious"	2002	Billy Crawford	Ride
"How Did She Know"	2002	Her Sanity	Xclusive
"Coulda Woulda Shoulda" (Featuring Case)	2002	Montell Jordan	Montell Jordan
"Repair Man"	2004	The O'Jays	Imagination
"One Good Woman"	2004	The O'Jays	Imagination
"It's Alright"	2004	Kimberley Locke	One Love
"Brave Honest Beautiful" (Featuring Meghan Trainor)	2015	Fifth Harmony	Reflection

== Awards and nominations ==
Year	Awarding Body	Award	Result	Ref
2003	ASCAP Rhythm & Soul Awards	Award-Winning R&B/Hip-Hop Songs (Anything)	Won	
