= Do U Wanna Roll (Dolittle Theme) =

Single by R.L., Snoop Dogg and Lil' Kim

from the album Dr. Dolittle 2 soundtrack and RL: Ements
- Released: 2001
- Genre: Hip hop; R&B; pop rap
- Length: 4:33
- Label: J Records
- Songwriters: Calvin Broadus; Kimberly Jones; R. L. Huggar
- Producer: Battlecat

R.L. singles chronology
"Good Love" (2001)	"Do U Wanna Roll (Dolittle Theme)" (2001)	"Got Me a Model" (2002)

Snoop Dogg singles chronology
"Just a Baby Boy" (2001)	"Do U Wanna Roll (Dolittle Theme)" (2001)	"Wrong Idea" (2001)

Lil' Kim singles chronology
"Wait a Minute" (2001)	"Do U Wanna Roll (Dolittle Theme)" (2001)	"Lady Marmalade" (2001)

"Do U Wanna Roll (Dolittle Theme)" is a song by American recording artists R.L., Snoop Dogg and Lil' Kim. It was released in 2001 as the single for the soundtrack to the 2001 film Dr. Dolittle 2 with the record label J Records. The song also makes an appearance on RL debut studio album RL: Ements. The song contains interpolations from the song "Doo Wa Ditty (Blow That Thing)" (1982) by funk band Zapp from their second studio album Zapp II.

== Track listing ==
- CD single
1. Do U Wanna Roll (Dolittle Theme) (Radio Edit Without Intro) (R.L., Snoop Dogg and Lil' Kim) — 4:02
2. Do U Wanna Roll (Dolittle Theme) (Radio Edit With Intro) (R.L., Snoop Dogg and Lil' Kim) — 4:02
3. Do U Wanna Roll (Dolittle Theme) (Instrumental) — 4:43
4. Do U Wanna Roll (Dolittle Theme) (Call Out Hook) (R.L., Snoop Dogg and Lil' Kim) — 0:10

== Chart performance ==
=== Weekly charts ===
Chart (2001)	Peak position
US Billboard Hot 100	84
US Hot R&B/Hip-Hop Songs (Billboard)	52
US Rap Songs (Billboard)	11
US Rhythmic (Billboard)	19
