= Kid Rad =

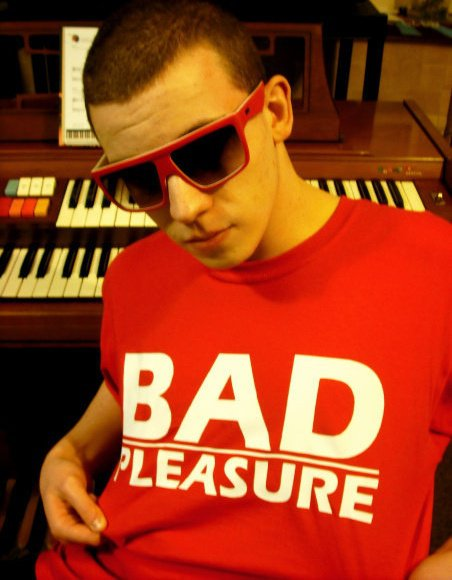
- A portrait of Kid Rad

Background information
- Born: 2 December 1990 (age 35)
- Origin: Birmingham, England
- Genres: Hip hop House Music; Electronica; Drum n Bass
- Instruments: vocals, synthesizer, drums
- Years active: 2004–present
- Labels: I Know What I Like Recordings; Occupy Your Mind Records (2005-2010)

Kid Rad (born 2 December 1990) is a British music artist, record producer and entrepreneur. He is most noted for his work with British singer/ songwriter Just Jack, as well as American rappers Masta Ace and Shade Sheist. He was the first British rap artist to perform live on BBC Radio 2.

== Musical career ==
Kid Rad first started experimenting with music in his early teens, and before long, he started producing and recording songs on a small set up in his bedroom. By pure chance, these tracks were heard by a local record producer and label owner Peter 'Lunatrix' Jordan, who signed him to his label, Occupy Your Mind Records, on a development deal.

His first big break came in 2005 when he appeared live on HHB Radio, rapping alongside N Dubz. He impressed both the listeners on the show and also the group's management at the time, and former Mungo Jerry bassist, the late Byron Contostavlos.

Over the next two years, Kid Rad continued to develop his talent and began to incorporate other styles of music into his work. He released various singles with varying success, the biggest of which, "Signs", became popular within the UK grime scene and was featured on the internationally released compilation album UK State Of Mind.

== Debut album ==
In 2007, Kid Rad started work on his debut album, Disturbing The Sequence. The title was given to the project by the record's executive producer Peter 'Lunatrix' Jordan.

In December 2008, Kid Rad revealed on his Myspace that the album would be a blend of hip hop, electronica, house and drum and bass, and that he had recently recorded collaborations with Just Jack, Masta Ace and Shade Sheist for the project. The album was released on 3 May 2010.

== BBC 'Love Where You Live' campaign ==
As part of the BBC's 'Love Where You Live' campaign, Kid Rad performed three tracks from his debut album and was interviewed live on BBC Radio 2 on 21 May 2009. In an exclusive interview with Janice Long, Kid Rad spoke about where he grew up, his first steps in music, and why his origins are still important to him. Two of the tracks performed ("I Begin To See" and "It's You") were exclusive to this appearance and had never been heard before, with the final track being "Across These Walls". This made him the first British rap artist to perform live on the station in its 44-year history.
