= Welcome II Nextasy =

2000 studio album by Next

Studio album by Next
- Released: June 20, 2000
- Length: 63:40
- Label: Arista
- Producers: Darrell Alamby; Allstar; Tommy Barbarella; Eddie Berkeley; Kenny Flav; Rob Fusari; Carleton Hitchcock; J. Issac; KayGee; Falonte Moore; Andrew Ramsey; Shannon Sanders; T-Low

Next chronology
Rated Next (1997)	Welcome II Nextasy (2000)	The Next Episode (2002)

Singles from Welcome II Nextasy
- 1. "Wifey" Released: May 16, 2000

Welcome II Nextasy the second studio album by American R&B trio Next. It was released by Arista Records on June 20, 2000, in the United States where it reached gold status.

== Critical reception ==
Professional ratings
Review scores
Source	Rating
AllMusic	2.5/5 stars
USA Today	3/4 stars

AllMusic editor John Bush found that while "there's no breakout hit the quality of "Too Close," Next's sophomore album Welcome II Nextasy is smoother and features a better overall production than their debut. The trio's version of hip-hop-soul is just as explicit as before; from "Cybersex" to "Let's Make a Movie" to "Banned from TV," Next proves themselves the Barry White of the '90s." Billboard remarked that "working again with Naughty By Nature's KayGee and others, Next goes for more originality vs. samples and tackles subjects both provocative and real [...] Those who like their R&B/hip-hop naughty – but still nice – won't be disappointed." Steve Jones from USA Today praised the trio's "ability to contrast moods and ideas" and noting that tracks like "Wifey", "Cybersex", and "The Jerk" showcase their "voices to back up their sexy swagger," with harmonies shining on the sensuous "When We Kiss".

== Track listing ==
Welcome II Nextasy track listing
No.	Title	Writer(s)	Producer(s)	Length
1.	"Welcome II Nextasy (Intro)"	Rob Fusari; Falonte Moore	Fusari; Moore	1:08
2.	"What U Want" (featuring Beanie Sigel)	Allen Gordon, Jr.; Michael Omartian; Michael Price; Aleese Simmons; Latrelle Simmons; Dan Walsh	Allstar	4:19
3.	"Wifey"	Cynthia Loving; Eddie Berkeley; Keir Gist; Robert Lavelle Huggar	Berkeley; KayGee	4:03
4.	"Cybersex"	Gist; Darren Lighty; Huggar	Kaygee	4:56
5.	"Beauty Queen"	Carleton Hitchcock; Tommy Barbarella; Berkeley; Gist; Huggar	Berkeley; KayGee; Hitchcock; Barbarella	3:53
6.	"When We Kiss"	Antonio Mobley; Darrell Alamby; Jonathen Rasboro; Kenny Dickerson; Lincoln Browder	Allamby; Kenny Flav	5:07
7.	"Jerk" (featuring 50 Cent)	Curtis Jackson; Berkeley; Huggar; Gist; Ultramagnetic MCs	Berkeley; KayGee	3:45
8.	"Call on Me"	Andrew Ramsey; Shannon Sanders; Huggar	Ramsey; Sanders	4:38
9.	"Shorty"	Berkeley; Gist; Huggar	Berkeley; KayGee	4:19
10.	"Minnesnowta (Interlude)"	T. Brown; J. Issac	T-Low; Isaac	0:38
11.	"Let's Make a Movie"	Berkeley; Gist; Huggar; Lighty	KayGee; Berkeley^{[a]}; T-Low^{[a]}	4:49
12.	"My Everything"	Berkeley; Gist; Huggar	Berkeley; KayGee	4:00
13.	"Splash"	Moore; Gist; Huggar; Lighty	KayGee	5:05
14.	"Banned from TV"	Berkeley; Gist; Huggar	Berkeley; KayGee	4:00
15.	"Oh No No" (featuring Red Rat and Renee Neufville; also contains hidden track "Freak in Me")	Gist; Lighty; Neufville	KayGee	9:00
Total length:				63:40

- "Oh No No" contains a 4:55 hidden track "Freak in Me", written by Al West, Chad Elliott, Jovonn Alexander, and Robert L. Huggar.

Sample credits

- "What U Want" features samples from "Holdin' Out (For Your Love)" as originally performed by Rhythm Heritage.
- "Jerk" contains an interpolation of "Ego Trippin" as written by Ultramagnetic MCs.

== Charts ==
=== Weekly charts ===
Weekly chart performance for Welcome II Nextasy
Chart (2000)	Peak position
Australian Albums (ARIA)	74
UK Albums (Official Charts)	85
UK R&B Albums (Official Charts)	12
US Billboard 200	12
US Top R&B/Hip-Hop Albums (Billboard)	4

=== Year-end charts ===
Year-end chart performance for Welcome II Nextasy
Chart (2000)	Position
US Billboard 200	136
US Top R&B/Hip-Hop Albums (Billboard)	56

== Certifications ==
Certifications for Welcome II Nextasy
Region	Certification	Certified units/sales
United Kingdom (BPI)	Silver	60,000^{*}
United States (RIAA)	Gold	500,000^{^}
^{*} Sales figures based on certification alone.^{^} Shipments figures based on certification alone.
