= Wifey (song) =

2000 single by Next

Single by Next

from the album Welcome II Nextasy
- B-side: "Jerk"
- Released: May 8, 2000
- Length: 4:03
- Label: Arista
- Songwriters: Cynthia Loving; Eddie Berkeley; Keir Gist; Robert L. Huggar
- Producers: Eddie Berkeley; KayGee

Next singles chronology
"I Still Love You" (1998)	"Wifey" (2000)	"Beauty Queen" (2000)

"Wifey" is a song by American R&B trio Next. The song was written by Eddie Berkeley, Keir Gist, band member Robert "RL" Huggar, and singer Lil' Mo for the group's second studio album, Welcome II Nextasy (2000). The song was released as the album's lead single on May 8, 2000. "Wifey" peaked at number one on the US Billboard Hot R&B/Hip-Hop Singles & Tracks chart while reaching number seven on the Billboard Hot 100. It also entered the top 20 in New Zealand and the United Kingdom. In 2001, the song won an AWARD Rhythm & Soul Award for in the Award-Winning R&B/Hip-Hop Songs category.

== Music video ==
Directed by Jeff Richter, the video shows imagery of the band members treating their significant women with care as the video cuts to a stage where the guys along with three female dancers appear and perform on the stage. It then shows each member of the group attracting a woman ranging from velvet ropes outside a club, the bedroom and in the bathroom when the woman soaks in the bathtub. RJ’s “Wifey” is actress Natashia Williams.

== Track listings ==
US and European CD single

1. "Wifey" (radio mix) – 4:05
2. "Wifey" (instrumental) – 4:05

US maxi-CD single

1. "Wifey" (radio mix) – 4:05
2. "Wifey" (instrumental) – 4:05
3. "Jerk" (club mix featuring 50 Cent) – 3:47
4. "Jerk" (TV track featuring 50 Cent) – 3:47
5. "Wifey" (a cappella) – 3:40

US 12-inch single

A1. "Wifey" (album mix) – 4:05
A2. "Wifey" (instrumental) – 4:05
A3. "Wifey" (a cappella) – 3:45
B1. "Jerk" (club mix featuring 50 Cent) – 3:46
B2. "Jerk" (radio mix featuring 50 Cent) – 3:46
B3. "Jerk" (TV track featuring 50 Cent) – 3:46

UK CD single

1. "Wifey" – 4:03
2. "Wifey (DYNK vocal mix featuring Easy) – 5:22
3. "Wifey (DYNK 4 dub) – 5:22

UK 12-inch single

A1. "Wifey" – 4:02
A2. "Wifey (DYNK vocal mix) – 5:30
B1. "Wifey (DYNK vocal mix featuring Easy) – 5:22
B2. "Wifey (DYNK 4 dub) – 5:09

German CD single

1. "Wifey" (radio mix) – 4:10
2. "Jerk" (featuring 50 Cent) – 3:46
3. "Wifey" (instrumental) – 4:07
4. "Too Close" – 4:19

== Personnel ==
Personnel are adapted from the liner notes of Welcome II Nextasy.

- Eddie Berkeley – writing, production
- Raphael "Tweety" Brown – vocals
- Terry "T-Low" Brown – vocals
- Robert "R.L." Huggar – writing, vocals
- KayGee – mixing, production, writing
- Adam Kudzin – mixing
- Lil' Mo – writing, additional vocals
- Shane Stoneback – engineering assistance

== Charts ==
=== Weekly charts ===
Chart (2000)	Peak position
Australia (ARIA)	64
Belgium (Ultratip Bubbling Under Wallonia)	18
Canada Top Singles (RPM)	25
Canada Dance/Urban (RPM)	4
Europe (European Hot 100 Singles)	56
Germany (GfK)	80
Netherlands (Dutch Top 40 Tipparade)	1
Netherlands (Single Top 100)	57
New Zealand (Recorded Music NZ)	19
Scottish Singles Sales (Official Charts)	91
Sweden (Sverigetopplistan)	60
UK Singles (Official Charts)	19
UK Dance (Official Charts)	7
UK Hip Hop/R&B (Official Charts)	2
US Billboard Hot 100	7
US Hot R&B/Hip-Hop Songs (Billboard)	1
US Pop Airplay (Billboard)	40
US Rhythmic Airplay (Billboard)	5

=== Year-end charts ===
Chart (2000)	Position
UK Urban (Music Week)	3
US Billboard Hot 100	53
US Hot R&B/Hip-Hop Singles & Tracks (Billboard)	14
US Rhythmic Top 40 (Billboard)	19

== Certifications ==
Region	Certification	Certified units/sales
United Kingdom (BPI)	Silver	200,000^{‡}
^{‡} Sales+streaming figures based on certification alone.

== Release history ==
Region	Date	Format(s)	Label(s)	Ref.
United States	May 8, 2000	Urban radio	Arista	
United States	May 9, 2000	Rhythmic contemporary radio	Arista	
United States	June 20, 2000	Contemporary hit radio	Arista	
United Kingdom	September 4, 2000	12-inch vinyl; CD; cassette	Arista	
