= RL: Ements =

Studio album by RL
- Released: April 23, 2002
- Genre: R&B
- Length: 56:55
- Label: J
- Producer: DJ Battlecat; Bryan Michael Cox; Jermaine Dupri; Walter Millsap III; Rick Rock; RL; Soulshock & Karlin; Chucky Thompson; Tim & Bob; The Underdogs

RL chronology
RL: Ements (2002)	Important (2007)

Singles from RL: Ements
- 1. "Got Me a Model" Released: 2001; 2. "Good Man" Released: 2002

RL: Ements is the only studio album by American singer RL, formerly front man of the band Next. It was released by J Records on April 23, 2002, in the United States. RL: Ements debuted and peaked at number six on the US Billboard Top R&B/Hip-Hop Albums. The album failed to produce any charting singles on the US Billboard Hot 100.

== Critical reception ==
Professional ratings
Review scores
Source	Rating
Allmusic	3/5 stars

Allmusic editor Jason Birchmeier found that "RL is no Usher. But that isn't to say his debut album, RL: Ements, proves disappointing. In fact, it's a respectable debut that's unfortunately hurt by a lack of known collaborators [...] Like similar male vocalists such as Nate Dogg and Carl Thomas, RL struggles on his own. He's certainly no singer/songwriter, and his charisma unfortunately isn't as abundant as his poster-boy looks and sultry musings. And unless those looks and musings cause you to swoon, you're left feeling a little bored during the album's long middle stretch, which is devoid of guests [...] RL doesn't really have anything extraordinary to offer."

== Track listing ==
No.	Title	Producer(s)	Length
1.	"Elements"	RL; Walter Millsap III	2:36
2.	"Got Me a Model" (featuring Erick Sermon)	Jermaine Dupri; Bryan Michael Cox^{[a]}	4:11
3.	"Whatcha Wanna Do"	RL; Millsap	3:55
4.	"Ghetto" (featuring Shaheed "The Poster Boy")	Rick Rock	4:57
5.	"Good Man"	The Underdogs	3:57
6.	"I'll Give You Anything"	Tim & Bob	4:32
7.	"Tempted"/"Temptation Island"	RL; Millsap	4:54
8.	"K.N.O.W."	RL; Millsap	4:17
9.	"Damn!"	Soulshock & Karlin	4:08
10.	"Luv Led Me 2 U"	Tim & Bob	4:26
11.	"As Long as U Know"	Millsap	2:52
12.	"What I'm Looking 4"	Chucky Thompson	4:53

Bonus track
No.	Title	Producer(s)	Length
13.	"Do U Wanna Roll" (featuring Snoop Dogg & Lil' Kim)	DJ Battlecat	4:36

Hidden track
No.	Title	Producer(s)	Length
14.	"Thank You"	Millsap	2:41

Notes

- ^{^a} denotes co-producer

== Charts ==
Chart (2002)	Peak position
US Billboard 200	53
US Top R&B/Hip-Hop Albums (Billboard)	6
