= Andre Deyo =

American singer-songwriter

Andre' "mrDEYO" Deyo

Background information
- Also known as: mrDEYO
- Born: Andre' Nathaniel Deyo; April 19, 1978 (age 48)
- Origin: Paterson, New Jersey, United States
- Genres: R&B, pop, dance, hip hop
- Occupations: Executive, Singer, songwriter, author
- Years active: 2001–present
- Labels: Dopeski Ent, TS.A, Sony, SongU.com
- Website: thedopesite.com

Andre' Nathaniel Deyo (born April 19, 1978), better known by his stage name mrDEYO, is an American R&B singer and songwriter best known for writing "Jenny From The Block" for Jennifer Lopez and subsequently writing the book "Jenny & Becky From The Block" after the release of "Becky From The Block" by Becky G. He has been signed to a publishing deal with Sony/ATV Music Publishing since 2002.

== Author ==
=== 2013 ===
"Jenny & Becky From The Block" is an autobiographical story about Deyo's most successful release, "Jenny From The Block" originally written by Deyo and recorded by Natasha Ramos, then by Jennifer Lopez, and covered by Becky G. Deyo describes his experiences and details the ways in which he created "Jenny From The Block" following his interaction and involvement with its new version by Becky G which featured Jennifer Lopez in the video. The book was released independently through Deyo's social media outlets and on his website.

== Music career ==
=== 2001 ===
Deyo released his first song with Arista recording artist Koffee Brown titled "I Got Love" (Scars) from their Mars/Venus album and was featured on the hook and rap (produced by Chris Liggio).

=== 2002-2003 ===
During his placement in autumn of 2002, Deyo wrote "Jenny from the Block" for Jennifer Lopez, which reached number three on the Billboard Hot 100 chart. The song inspired the new nickname "J. Lo" and reached number one in Argentina and Canada, and entered the top ten on multiple charts. It was produced by Troy Oliver (of New Haven, CT) and featured Jadakiss and Styles (of The Lox). The This Is Me... Then album also produced another DEYO written single, a co-write with Cory Rooney "I'm Glad". It was #4 on the Hot Dance Charts (4 weeks) and won a Billboard Award for Best Selling Latin Song of the Year. The video was nominated for four MTV Video Music Awards in 2003: Best Female Video, Best Dance Video, Best Choreography, and Best Art Direction.

Deyo's pen and vocal skills went into Ginuwine's fourth album entitled The Senior with the songs "Chedda Brings" a co-write with longtime collaborator Antonio McClendon and "Big Plans" which featured Method Man. Deyo's vocal backgrounds can be heard on each of these records and is credited on the album. DEYO also lent his hand and vocal production to Monica's only #1 album After the Storm, which was the long-awaited release of All Eyez on Me. The song "Go To Bed Mad" was a duet featuring label mate Tyrese (selected by Apple's Larry Jackson and RCA CEO Peter Edge).

=== 2004 ===
Deyo had another single with O'Ryan (Omarion's look alike little brother) called "Take It Slow" . The song was a co-write with Tommy Niblack (who vocal produced with Deyo on "Go To Bed Mad"), Makeba Riddick (Woods) (of Beyoncé fame), and Adonis Shropshire (Bad Boy hit writer). A month later he landed a placement with Frankee, famous for her answer back song to Eamon's "Fuck It (I Don't Want You Back)" called F.U.R.B. (Fuck You Right Back). Linking together with producer Chris Liggio again he penned "I Told U So" for her release The Good, the Bad, the Ugly.

=== 2005–2006 ===
Deyo began his label, TS.A Records. He also worked with Jared Cotter (JL Cotter) on his project "The Album B4 The Album" contributing four songs: "Mo' Thangs", "Make U Cry" feat. Stimuli (co-written with Cotter and Greg Bruno), "Just Tell Him", and "Business & Pleasure". The project was released on April 21, 2005, in an effort to gain an unknown Cotter more exposure from record labels he sought to be signed by. Deyo would commonly tap Jared to demo his songs @ Sony/ATV Music Studios in New York City and continued to work with him to reach his goal of becoming an artist. In 2007 Jared found success as a top 12 contestant on American Idol (Season 6), then to hosting Fuse Network's "The Sauce", and "The Challenge" on MSG. In 2009 Cotter co-wrote the Billboard Hot 100 #1 hit / ASCAP Award winner "Down" by Cash Money artist Jay Sean as well as the majority of the album. Cotter currently manages the artist Bazzi.

=== 2007–2008 ===
He took a turn as the artist on his CD single "She Hot" on his independent TS.A Records via iTunes, which included snippets to his upcoming album Human Beings Club which has yet to be released although it was expected in the summer of 2007.

In December 2007 he began work with Dan Talevski (of YouTube popularity), penning his industry insiders favorite "Quick & Slow" produced by The HeavyWeights and he also lent a hand in putting a bridge on Dan's YouTube Classic "Rocket & Go" which the HeavyWeights reproduced for the clubs. He has unreleased material on Natasha Ramos, whose long-awaited debut comes from Pharrell Williams' Star Trak Entertainment label.

December 2007: Deyo began working with the girl group "Queenz" of Queens, New York through longtime friend and collaborator Kenny Ortiz (known best for his role in signing and developing the famous New York, NY group SWV). Deyo's involvement included recording, vocal producing, writing, demoing, and providing ideas on their sound, look, and marketing. Their first song recorded with Deyo, entitled "Set Me Free", was written by DEYO and Jason Gilmore. It was produced by The HeavyWeights.

August 14, 2008: Theneptunes. com (the Neptunes's #1 fansite) reports Natasha Ramos as working on her new solo album. No release date given but the confirmed track listing has "Strawberries" and "Music Box" on it, written and vocal produced by Deyo. Both tracks were produced by Troy Oliver.

Sep 8, 2008: mrDEYO reveals through his social media (Myspace) page that he is working on his first full album "Digital Love" slated for an October 14 release to coincide with the grand opening of his TS.A Studios and Consulting Company in Wolcott, CT. Possible album features are rumored to be singers Natasha Ramos, Antonio McLendon, and Dan Talevski and rappers Jus Mula, and HeadRush of Connecticut. His Billboard advertisement in 2007 was for an album titled "Human Beings Club" which was never released. Production is from longtime collaborator Troy Oliver ("Jenny From The Block" and "Differences" fame), Dante Ross VP of Steve Rifkind Company (legendary A&R who signed Queen Latifah and Busta Rhymes), mrDEYO and up and comers from overseas, WeProduceThem and C-Tease (Dan Talevski's Hunger Pains Remix). No word yet on a single.

October 31, 2008: mrDEYO releases "Digital Love" for FREE via the web and his social media page (Myspace) page The album containing 13 songs plus a bonus cut, along with a PDF of the lyric book, and the artwork is included with each download. All vocals on the album are by mrDEYO, and most songs include use of the "Auto-Tune" effect T-Pain is widely known for making popular in today's music, which mrDEYO has been known to use since 2001.

November 1, 2008: The song "After Midnight" (listed as artist Andre Deyo) is the first song on a downloadable compilation featured on website RNB4U.in, which describes itself as "the finest in R&B". It was listed and featured on many other R&B sites and compilations, which are known for getting, promoting, and providing the best exclusives in urban music.

=== 2009 ===
Jennifer Lopez's Greatest Hits album will feature the two singles "I'm Glad" and "Jenny From The Block" mrDEYO wrote for her, and it has been reported that it may be released in February 2009. At one points reports were saying (with no official confirmation) that Lopez is releasing new material on the album "STILL FROM THE BLOCK" (which celebrates her 10 years of hits in the industry) including first single "Still From The Block" produced by Swizz Beats which will hit radio January 9, 2009. The video will premier at the end of January. Lopez has yet to release her greatest hits and has since left Epic Records who was set to drop the album. She is now signed with Def Jam and there has been no further talks on the greatest hits project.

Since 2009 Deyo has been with SongU.com, coaching and giving his professional opinion on SongU members songs as well as sharing songwriter experiences with them.

=== 2010 ===
Deyo was listed as one of Waterbury, Connecticut's Notable Waterburians in the 2010 and 2011 Waterbury Guide. Via his Facebook and Twitter he has notified his friends and fans he's still in development stages with the girl group Queenz, recording at Quad Studios and Diddy's Daddy's House Recording Studio. Artist Dan Talevski makes his debut in May.

November 3, 2010 "For Colored Girls" is released independently on Melodye Perry. Originally written for the film of the same name by Tyler Perry, it was co-written with Perry, Jason Gilmore. It was also co-written and produced by Tommy Niblack.

=== 2011 ===
November 21, 2011 One year after releasing "For Colored Girls" as an independent release Melodye Perry releases her EP "Melodye" on Island Def/Jam. "This One's For Colored Girls" appears as track #4.

=== 2012 ===
January 21, 2012 Jared Cotter released "Mo' Thangs" as a single on iTunes as an independent release (Cafe De Soul).

Jennifer Lopez released her "greatest hits" project titled "Dance Again... The Hits" on July 24, 2012, which featured "Jenny From The Block". The album was a moderate commercial success, peaking within the top ten in fourteen national charts and the top twenty in ten national charts.

Aisha released her first album "I, Shout!!!" on Sony Music/Japan on October 3, 2012. Deyo co-wrote the song "Sing For You" with Aisha on the track produced by Chris Liggio.

December 21, 2012 Antonio McLendon releases long-awaited music on his "The Truth" mix tape hosted by DJ Chubby Chubb. Deyo co-wrote "Scream". The track was produced by Latin Billboard Nominee LamonSounz. The two collaborated during the summer months and have unreleased material that is tentatively set to be released in 2013.

=== 2013 ===
March 6, 2013 - vh1's Love and Hip Hop New York cast member, rapper Lore'l, releases "Benjamin", a mrDEYO co-write with Lyn Miller, Erika Kayne, Garfield Bjorn, and Guillermo Edghill Jr. to a track produced by Big Nate and Case Boogie. He also displays his vocal production and mixing skills (assistant) on the song.

April 8, 2013 - 16-year-old rapper and Cover Girl Becky G (Kemosabe Records/RCA) releases "Becky From The Block" audio and music video. The video features "Jenny From The Block" singer Jennifer Lopez giving her approval of her heavily sampled hit from 2002 by the young upstart. A cameo was also made by Lopez's beau Casper Smart. As of March 2024, the YouTube video has amassed some 93+ million views thus far. The song was to be featured on Becky's untitled first full album release which was come Spring 2014 but yet has yet to materialize.

July 29, 2013 - Unsigned songstress Erika Kayne releases "Go Stupid" song and viral video written by Deyo produced by Case Boogie. Deyo wrote 60+ songs in a matter of 2 months for Erika's debut EP "Citizen Kayne" which was set to be released through her production company Vyrus Entertainment headed by industry veteran Charles Farrar (who discovered Trey Songz). Deyo's name was incorrectly added last as a writer on the song's credits, when he in fact wrote the entire song.

October 7, 2013 - Erika Kayne Releases "Courage" song and video written by Deyo and produced by Case Boogie. Again, Deyo's name was incorrectly credited on this cut as well, as he wrote the song alone.

=== 2014 ===
April 18, 2014 - Erika Kayne Releases "Have Him" written by Deyo as part of her "Nostalgia" mixtape containing mostly cover songs. Produced by Case Boogie and released by Vyrus Entertainment. Deyo was not involved on the vocal production of this record outside of recording his own demo while writing it, which Kayne and her team used as a guide to record it.

According to his Twitter page, Deyo is currently working on highly anticipated releases heavily with engineer/producer Garfield "June" Bjorn (@ibethatjune) on new projects to be released in 2014.

=== 2015 ===
June 17, 2015 - Deyo and long time collaborator Garfield "June" Bjorn create Dopeski Ent., an independent record label in Waterbury, CT. The company specializes in Music, Film, and Technology. Plans for the new studio is conceived and started by Bjorn.

=== 2016 ===
September 2016 - The studio is completed enough for the recording process to begin for the artists and select public clients.

=== 2017 ===
Deyo and Bjorn reveal they will release new material from their artists: Zae France, Rizzie Redd, Lyn Miller, and MizzyLott in summer 2017. Recordings took place at "The Stu", Waterbury, CT.

=== TS.A Studios (Wolcott, CT) ===
From November 24, 2008, to May 4, 2010, TS.A Studios and Consulting was open for business in Wolcott, CT. It was owned and operated by Andre Deyo. Its focus was centered on nurturing Connecticut's talent at affordable rates, and providing industry hits and recordings.

2011 - While Bjorn is looking to relocate his studio, Deyo recommends TS.A Studios previous location. Together the two work at Young Leader Studios with talent to create songs for placement.

=== The Stu (Waterbury, CT) ===
September 2016 - After a year and half of building from the ground up, Dopeski Ent. completes a studio for its existing and potential roster of talent to record close to home, without having to travel to places like New York and New Jersey to be able to create professional hit records. Studio Manager and Engineer: Garfield "June" Bjorn. 203.768.1884 or 203.805.1856
