= Ghetto Love (Jaheim album) =

Studio album by Jaheim
- Released: March 13, 2001
- Length: 66:15
- Label: Divine Mill; Warner Bros.

Jaheim chronology
Ghetto Love (2001)	Still Ghetto (2002)

Singles from Ghetto Love
- 1. "Could It Be" Released: November 21, 2000; 2. "Just in Case" Released: June 19, 2001; 3. "Anything" Released: February 26, 2002

Ghetto Love is the debut studio album by American R&B singer Jaheim. It was released by Divine Mill Records and Warner Bros. on March 13, 2001 in the United States. The album debuted at number 9 on the US Billboard 200 with first-week sales of 80,000 copies and ended up being certified platinum by the Recording Industry Association of America (RIAA), selling a million copies in the United States. Ghetto Love features the hit singles "Could It Be", and "Just in Case".

== Promotion ==
The album was supported by the release of three singles between 2000 and 2002. The lead single, "Could It Be," achieved strong commercial success, peaking at number 26 on the US Billboard Hot 100, number 2 on the US Hot R&B/Hip-Hop Songs chart, and number 33 in the United Kingdom. The second single, "Just in Case," reached number 52 on the Billboard Hot 100, number 15 on the US R&B chart, and number 34 in the UK Singles Chart. The final single, "Anything," featuring Next, peaked at number 28 on the Billboard Hot 100 and number 6 on the US R&B chart.

== Critical reception ==
Professional ratings
Review scores
Source	Rating
AllMusic	3/5 stars
Muzik	5/5 stars
NME	3.5/5 stars
Q	3/5 stars
Robert Christgau	(dud)
Rolling Stone	2.5/5 stars
Uncut	4/5 stars

NME editor Lucy O'Brien described Ghetto Love as a blend of "ineffable sweetness of classic soul" and hip-hop sensibility, noting its "grainy, cinematic feel" and mournful emotional depth rooted in street narratives. She highlighted its standout balance between "soaring melody and atmospheric beats," while acknowledging a tendency toward overextended ballads. Barry Walters, writing for Rolling Stone, characterised the album as part of the early-2000s "beefcake soul" wave, updating Barry White– and Teddy Pendergrass–style loverman R&B for a hip-hop generation. He argued that while Ghetto Love leans heavily on skits, minimal harmonic structures and glossy production, its occasional melodic breakthroughs hint at a more inventive artist beneath the familiar genre templates. PopMatters hailed the album as a standout debut amid heavy anticipation and bootleg buzz, arguing it delivers one of the strongest male R&B vocal performances in years. He praised Jaheim's rich, Pendergrass-like delivery and the blend of hip-hop production with classic soul sensibilities, describing the result as a "satisfying mix of the rough and the smooth" that revives traditional vocal-driven R&B.

== Commercial performance ==
On the US Billboard 200, Ghetto Love opened and peaked at number 9, selling 80,000 units in its first week. It performed even more strongly on the US Top R&B/Hip-Hop Albums chart, reaching number 2. In year-end performance for 2001, the album placed at number 100 on the US Billboard 200 and number 21 on the US Top R&B/Hip-Hop Albums chart. In terms of sales certifications, the album was awarded Platinum status by the Recording Industry Association of America (RIAA), representing over 1,000,000 units shipped in the United States. In the United Kingdom, the album peaked at number 50 on the UK Albums Chart and number 5 on the UK R&B Albums Chart. In 2013, it was certified Silver by the British Phonographic Industry (BPI).

== Track listing ==
Ghetto Love track listing
No.	Title	Writer(s)	Producer(s)	Length
1.	"Intro"			1:06
2.	"Du & Jah"	Keir Gist; Daquan Youngblood; Jaheim Hoagland	KayGee	0:45
3.	"Looking for Love"	Gist; Hoagland; Willie Hutch; Darren Lighty; Eric Williams; Melvin Lewis	KayGee; D. Lighty	3:53
4.	"Interlude: Answering Machine"			0:22
5.	"Let It Go" (featuring Castro)	Hoagland; Williams; Wesley Hogges; Carlton Upton; Kyron Sumpter; Mike Post; Pete Carpenter	Williams; Hogges	2:46
6.	"Could It Be"	Williams; Hogges; C. Lighty; Kent Lawrence; Balewa Muhammed; Tony Hester	Williams; Hogges; Lawrence^{[a]}	3:46
7.	"Ghetto Love"	Hoagland; Williams; Hogges; John Drakeford	Williams; Hogges; Drakeford	4:23
8.	"Happiness"	Hoagland; Williams; Hogges; Hans Leip; Norbert Schultze	Williams; Hogges	3:21
9.	"Interlude: Jah's Seed"			1:10
10.	"Lil' Nigga Ain't Mine" (featuring Castro, Duganz & Precise)	Eugene Hanes, Jr.; Kevin Veney; Loren Hill; Sumpter; Williams; Hoagland; Youngblood; Marcella Brailsford; Hogges	Hanes; Veney; Hill	3:51
11.	"Finders Keepers" (featuring Lil Mo)	Barry Salter; Cynthia Loving	Salter	3:18
12.	"Just in Case"	Gist; Eddie Berkeley; R.L. Huggar	KayGee; Berkeley	3:30
13.	"Heaven in My Eyes"	Gist; Berkeley; Muhammed; Arkeida Clowers; C. Lighty; Hoagland	KayGee; Berkeley	3:51
14.	"Anything" (featuring Next)	Gist; Falonte Moore; Huggar	KayGee; Moore	4:47
15.	"Waitin' on You" (featuring Miss Jones)	Williams; Hogges; Chris Joe; Larence	Williams; Hogges	4:23
16.	"Remarkable" (featuring Terry Dexter)	Gist; Berkeley; Huggar	KayGee; Berkeley	4:50
17.	"Ready, Willing & Able"	Gist; D. Lighty; C. Lighty; Frank Wilson; Daniel Pearson	KayGee; D. Lighty	4:57
18.	"Love Is Still Here"	Gist; D. Lighty; Hoagland	KayGee; D. Lighty	1:31
19.	"Forever"	Gist; D. Lighty; Delvis Damon; Clowers	KayGee	4:05
20.	"For Moms"	Moore; D. Lighty; Hoagland	Moore	1:53
21.	"Could It Be" (Anything You Want Remix)	Williams; Hogges; Osten Harvey, Jr.; Craig Mack	Williams; Hogges; Drakeford^{[a]}	3:11
Total length:				66:15

Notes

- ^{^[a]} denotes co-producer(s)

Sample credits

- "Looking for Love" contains elements from "Brothers Gonna Work It Out" as performed by Willie Hutch.
- "Let It Go" contains elements from "White Shadow Theme" as written by Mike Post and Pete Carpenter.
- "Could It Be" contains elements from "Nothing Can Stop Me (From Loving You)" as written by Tony Hester.
- "Ready, Willing & Able" contains elements from "You Turned My Whole World Around" as performed by Barry White.
- "Could It Be (Anything You Want Remix)" contains elements from "Flava in Ya Ear" as performed by Craig Mack.

== Charts ==
=== Weekly charts ===
Weekly chart performance for Ghetto Love
Chart (2001)	Peak position
US Billboard 200	9
US Top R&B/Hip-Hop Albums (Billboard)	2
UK Albums (OCC)	50
UK R&B Albums (OCC)	5

=== Year-end charts ===
2001 year-end chart performance for Ghetto Love
Chart (2001)	Position
Canadian R&B Albums (Nielsen SoundScan)	120
US Billboard 200	100
US Top R&B/Hip-Hop Albums (Billboard)	21

2002 year-end chart performance for Ghetto Love
Chart (2002)	Position
US Billboard 200	138
US Top R&B/Hip-Hop Albums (Billboard)	14

== Certifications ==
Certifications for Ghetto Love
Region	Certification	Certified units/sales
United States (RIAA)	Platinum	1,000,000^{^}
United Kingdom (BPI)	Silver	60,000^{^}
^{^} Shipments figures based on certification alone.
