= Informal Introduction =

Studio album by Shade Sheist
- Released: September 10, 2002
- Recorded: 2000–02
- Studios: Larrabee Sound Studios; Soundcastle; Skip Saylor Recording; Westlake Recording Studios (Los Angeles, CA)
- Genres: West Coast hip hop; gangsta rap
- Length: 1:01:39
- Labels: Baby Ree; MCA
- Producers: Damizza (also exec.); DJ Quik; Eddie Berkeley; Howie Hersh; KayGee; Timbaland

Shade Sheist chronology
Informal Introduction (2002)	Before The Waitin' Before The Hatin' (2005)

Singles from Informal Introduction
- 1. "Where I Wanna Be" Released: October 7, 2000; 2. "Money Owners" Released: May 14, 2002; 3. "John Doe" Released: 2002; 4. "Wake Up" Released: 2002

Professional ratings
Review scores
Source	Rating
AllMusic	2.5/5 stars
HipHopDX	2.5/5

Informal Introduction is the debut studio album by American rapper Shade Sheist. It was released on September 10, 2002, through Baby Ree Productions and MCA Records. Recording sessions took place at Larrabee Studios, at Soundcastle, at Skip Saylor Recording, and at Westlake Recording Studios in Los Angeles. Production was handled by Damizza, Eddie Berkeley, KayGee, DJ Quik, Howie Hersh and Timbaland. It features guest appearances from Nate Dogg, AMG, DJ Clue, Fabolous, Hi-C, Knoc-turn'al, Kurupt, Vita and Warren G among others.

Due to little promotion, the album was not a commercial success, only reaching number 69 on the Billboard Top R&B/Hip-Hop Albums. It did, however, feature his biggest hit to date "Where I Wanna Be", which peaked at 95 on the Billboard Hot 100 and 12 on the Billboard Hot Rap Songs. The album spawned three additional singles, "Money Owners", "John Doe" and "Wake Up" all of which became minor hits on the R&B charts.

== Track listing ==
No.	Title	Writer(s)	Producer(s)	Length
1.	"Holla Boyz Intro" (featuring DJ Echo and DJ Vice)			1:08
2.	"Somebody Steals the Show"	T. Thompson; D. Young; H. Hersh	Damizza	4:25
3.	"Act Like You Know Me" (featuring Fabolous and Knoc-turn'al)	T. Thompson; J. Jackson; R. Harbor; H. Hersh	Howie Hersh; Damizza (co.)	5:04
4.	"John Doe" (featuring DJ Quik, AMG, Hi-C and Swift)	D. Blake; C. Wilkerson; J. Lewis; K. Martin	DJ Quik	3:25
5.	"X2" (featuring DJ Clue)	T. Thompson; D. Young; H. Hersh; W. Withers	Damizza	4:27
6.	"Walk a Mile" (featuring Barbara Wilson, Nate Dogg, N.U.N.E. and Vita)	T. Thompson; N. Hale; C. McCauley; L. Raynor; D. Young; H. Hersh	Damizza	3:45
7.	"Stop... and Think About It" (featuring Big Caz)	T. Thompson; D. Young; H. Hersh; B. Eland	Damizza; Shade Sheist (co.)	4:50
8.	"Money Owners" (featuring Timbaland)	T. Thompson; T. Mosley	Timbaland	4:26
9.	"Wake Up" (featuring Nate Dogg and Warren G)	T. Thompson; N. Hale; W. Griffin III; E. Berkeley; K. Gist; J. Mtume; R. James	Eddie Berkeley; Kay Gee	4:33
10.	"BMF"	T. Thompson; D. Young; H. Hersh	Damizza	4:17
11.	"Thug Luv" (featuring Barbara Wilson)	T. Thompson; D. Young; H. Hersh	Damizza	3:42
12.	"Cali Diseaz (Musik)" (featuring Nate Dogg)	T. Thompson; N. Hale; D. Young; H. Hersh	Damizza	4:12
13.	"Here I Come" (featuring Damizza)	T. Thompson; D. Young; H. Hersh	Damizza	3:24
14.	"Where I Wanna Be" (featuring Kurupt and Nate Dogg)	T. Thompson; R. Brown; N. Hale; E. Berkeley; K. Gist; R. Kimball; D. Paich	Eddie Berkeley; Kay Gee; Damizza (co.)	4:20
15.	"The Urban Gospel" (featuring King Arthur and N.U.N.E.)	T. Thompson; D. Young; H. Hersh	Damizza; Shade Sheist (co.)	4:18
16.	"Holla Boyz Outro" (featuring DJ Echo, DJ Vice and Damizza)			1:24
Total length:				1:01:39

== Personnel ==
- Tramayne Thompson – main artist, co-producer (tracks: 7, 15), co-executive producer, mixing (track 10)

Guest artists/vocalists

- Henry "DJ Echo" Olortegui – featured artist (tracks: 1, 16)
- Eric "DJ Vice" Aguirre – featured artist (tracks: 1, 16)
- Damion Young – featured artist (tracks: 13, 16), backing vocals (track 2)
- Latonya Holmes – backing vocals (track 2)
- John Jackson – featured artist (track 3)
- Royal Harbor – featured artist (track 3)
- David Blake – featured artist (track 4)
- Crawford Wilkerson – featured artist (track 4)
- Jason Lewis – featured artist (track 4)
- Kenyan "Swift" Martin – featured artist (track 4)
- Ernesto "DJ Clue" Shaw – featured artist (track 5)
- Barbara Wilson – featured artist (tracks: 6, 11), backing vocals (tracks: 6, 7, 11, 13)
- Nathaniel Dwayne Hale – featured artist (tracks: 6, 9, 12, 14)
- Chris "Nune" McCauley – featured artist (tracks: 6, 15)
- LaVita Raynor – featured artist (track 6)
- Caz – featured artist (track 7)
- Timothy Mosley – featured artist (track 8)
- Warren Griffin III – featured artist (track 9)
- Ricardo "Kurupt" Brown – featured artist (track 14)
- King Arthur – featured artist (track 15)

Instrumentalists

- Damion "Damizza" Young – drums (tracks: 2, 5, 6, 10–13, 15), programming (tracks: 2, 5, 6, 10, 11, 15), percussion (tracks: 2, 6, 13, 15), keyboards (track 5)
- Howard B. Hersh – bass & keyboards (tracks: 2, 5, 6, 10–13)
- DeVante Swing – keyboards (track 4)
- Emmanuel "DJ EMan" Coquia – scratches (track 5)
- Anthony Mazza – guitar (tracks: 7, 10)
- Florian Ammon – Pro Tools (tracks: 6, 7, 12, 13)
- D.B. Murda – programming (track 12)
- B.W.N. – programming (track 12)

Technicals

- Damizza – producer (tracks: 2, 5–7, 10–13, 15), co-producer (tracks: 3, 14), executive producer, recording (tracks: 6, 7, 11, 13)
- Howie Hersh – producer (track 3)
- David "DJ Quik" Blake – producer & mixing (track 4)
- Timothy "Timbaland" Mosley – producer & mixing (track 8)
- Edward Berkeley – producer (tracks: 9, 14)
- Kier Gist – producer (tracks: 9, 14)
- Michael Schlesinger – mixing (tracks: 2, 5–7, 10–15), recording (tracks: 2, 5, 6, 10–15)
- Jimmy Douglass – mixing (track 8)
- Steve Penny – engineering (track 8)
- Jeremy – recording (tracks: 6, 8)
- Ray – recording (track 7)
- Jason Schweitzer – recording (track 13)
- Evren Göknar – mastering
- Brian – additional editing (track 5)
- Aaron – additional engineering (track 8)

Additional

- Jesse Alvarez – art direction, design & illustration
- JP Robinson – art direction, design & illustration
- Manuel J. Donayre – art direction, design & illustration
- David Irvin – photography
- Anthony Mandler – photography
- Naim Ali – A&R
- Alicia N. Graham – A&R
- Sujit Kundu – management, co-executive producer

== Charts ==
Chart (2002)	Peak position
US Top R&B/Hip-Hop Albums (Billboard)	69
US Heatseekers Albums (Billboard)	20

=== Singles ===
List of singles, with selected chart positions
Title	Year	Peak chart positions			
Title	Year	US	US R&B	US Airplay	UK
"Where I Wanna Be" (featuring Nate Dogg & Kurupt)	2000	37	60	50	14
"Wake Up" (featuring Warren G & Nate Dogg)	2002	36	53	52	—
"John Doe" (featuring DJ Quik, Hi-C, AMG & Swift)	2002	—	66	64	—
"Money Owners" (featuring Timbaland)	2002	—	81	—	—
"—" denotes releases that did not chart or were not released in that country.
