= The Next Episode (album) =

Studio album by Next
- Released: December 17, 2002
- Length: 64:31
- Label: J
- Producer: Dinky Bingham; Steve Bundy; Eddie F; KayGee; Chris Liggio; Darren Lighty; Walter Millsap III; Salter; Scott Storch; Tramp

Next chronology
Welcome II Nextasy (2000)	The Next Episode (2002)

The Next Episode is the third studio album by American R&B trio Next. It was released on J Records on December 17, 2002 in the United States.

== Critical reception ==
Professional ratings
Review scores
Source	Rating
AllMusic	2/5 stars

AllMusic rated the album two stars out of five. Billboard found that The Next Episode "walks that fine line between sensuality and pure sexuality with a swagger all its own."

== Track listing ==
The Next Episode track listing
No.	Title	Writer(s)	Producer(s)	Length
1.	"Intro"	Keir Gist; Robert L. Huggar; Terence Abney	KayGee; Tramp	1:33
2.	"Your Love Is" (featuring Jaheim)	Gist; Huggar	Eddie F; Darren Lighty; KayGee	4:01
3.	"Imagine That"	Lighty; Edward Ferrell; Kevin McCord; Gist; Huggar	Eddie F; Lighty; KayGee	4:23
4.	"Do Your Thing"	Osborne Bingham; Gist; Huggar	Dinky Bingham; KayGee	4:16
5.	"I'm Tryin' to What"	Huggar; Scott Storch	Storch	4:23
6.	"Just Like That"	Chris Liggio; Gist; Huggar; Steve Bundy	Liggio; KayGee; Bundy	3:08
7.	"Feels Good"	Barry Salter; Michael Postil; Huggar	Salter; KayGee	3:22
8.	"Lights Out"	Huggar; Walter Millsap III	Millsap	4:44
9.	"Hold Me Down"	Harold Hudson; Abney; Thomas McClary	Tramp	3:46
10.	"That's My Word"	Byron Byrd; Lighty; Ferrell; Gist; Brown; Huggar	Eddie F; Lighty; KayGee	3:57
11.	"Girl, Lady, Woman"	Huggar; Millsap	Millsap	3:58
12.	"It's Okay"	Salter; Huggar	Salter	4:33
13.	"Brand New"	Lighty; Ferrell; Gist; Phil Pugh; Huggar; Sherman Marshall; Sylvester Jordan, Jr.	Eddie F; Lighty; KayGee	4:35
14.	"All Because of You"	Eric Walls; Gilbert Smith; John Millsap; Huggar; Ron Lee; W. Millsap	Millsap	4:41
15.	"Freaky Man"	Bingham; Gist; Lance Alexander; Brown; Huggar; Tony Tolbert	Bingham; KayGee	5:44
16.	"My Love" (Hidden track)	Balewa Muhammad; David Burrill; Roderick Howard; Jordan	Eddie F; Lighty; KayGee	3:27
Total length:				64:31

Sample credits

- "Imagine That" contains samples from the composition "If You Play Yours Cards Right", written by Kevin McCord by Alicia Meyers.
- "Feels Good" contains replayed elements from the composition "(Theme From) Hill Street Blues", written by Michael Postil.
- "Hold Me Down" contains excerpts from the composition "Saturday Night", written by Thomas McClary and Harold Hudson and performed by The Commodores.
- "That's My Word" contains samples from the composition "Time Is Passing", written by Byron Byrd and performed by Sun.
- "Brand New" contains samples from the composition "I Found Love (When I Found You)", written by Sherman Marshall and Phil Pugh and performed by The Spinners.

== Charts ==
Chart performance for The Next Episode
Chart (2002–03)	Peak position
US Billboard 200	120
US Top R&B/Hip-Hop Albums (Billboard)	27
