= Ideal (album) =

Studio album by Ideal
- Released: August 24, 1999
- Genre: R&B
- Length: 57:27
- Label: Virgin
- Producer: Jazze Pha; Donnie Scantz; Laney Stewart; Teddy Bishop; Bryan-Michael Cox; Jon-John & Joey Elias; Joe; Bishop "Stick" Burrell; J-Dub

Singles from Ideal
- 1. "Get Gone" Released: July 13, 1999; 2. "Creep Inn" Released: November 1999; 3. "Whatever" Released: September 11, 2000

Professional ratings
Review scores
Source	Rating
AllMusic	3/5 stars

Ideal is the only studio album by R&B group Ideal, released on August 24, 1999, by Virgin Records US.

The album sold 615,000 units in the U.S., according to Nielsen SoundScan, and was certified Gold by the RIAA. It features the hit single "Get Gone", which reached #13 on the Billboard Hot 100 chart, and the moderately successful third single "Whatever". AllMusic's Heather Phares called Ideal's initial effort a "heartfelt first album" that showcased the "group's smooth, sensuous vocal styling and romantic songwriting."

== Track listing ==
Standard

- Credits adapted from standard liner notes.
1. "Intro" (M. Cotton, C. Cotton, L. Perry, P. Alexander) (1:30)
2. "I Don't Mind" (P. Stewart, C. Thomas, T. Nkhereanye, M. Scandrick, M. Keith, D. Jones, Q. Parker) (4:05)
3. "Things You Can't Do" (J. Austin, T. Bishop, K. Hicks, C. Wallace, C. Smith, O. Harvey, Jr.) (3:49)
4. "Creep Inn" (J. Austin, B. Casey, B. Casey, B. Cox, M. Jackson) (4:28)
5. "Get Down With Me" (J. Robinson, E. Jackson, M. Cotton, J. Elias) (4:16)
6. "Get Gone" (J. Austin, K. Hicks, B. Cox) (4:35)
7. "Ideally Yours" (M. Cotton, C. Cotton, J. Green, L. Perry) (1:37)
8. "All About You" (M. Cotton, J. Green, L. Perry, D. Scantlebury, M. Cooper, A. Crosley, L. McCall) (4:06)
9. "Break Your Plans" (J. Robinson, J. Elias, J. Love) (4:15)
10. "There's No Way" (J. Austin, T. Bishop, K. Hicks) (3:15)
11. "Jealous Skies" (J. Thomas, J. Skinner, J. Thompson) (4:39)
12. "Never Let You Go" (M. Cotton) (4:35)
13. "Tell Me Why" (J. Walker, M. Cotton, C. Cotton, J. Green, L. Perry) (5:15)
14. "No More" (J. Green, L. Perry) (1:11)
15. "Pigeon" (Skit) (0:32)
16. "Sexy Dancer" (P. Alexander, S. Watson, J. Smith) (3:48)
17. "Outro" (M. Cotton, C. Cotton, J. Green, L. Perry, P. Alexander) (1:11)

Re-release

- Credits adapted from re-issue liner notes.
1. "Intro" (M. Cotton, C. Cotton, L. Perry, P. Alexander)
2. "I Don't Mind" (P. Stewart, C. Thomas, T. Nkhereanye, M. Scandrick, M. Keith, D. Jones, Q. Parker)
3. "Things You Can't Do"(J. Austin, T. Bishop, K. Hicks, C. Wallace, C. Smith, O. Harvey, Jr.)
4. "Whatever [Radio Version]" (K. Gist, R.L. Huggar, E. Berkeley)
5. "Creep Inn" (J. Austin, B. Casey, B. Casey, B. Cox, M. Jackson)
6. "Get Down With Me" (J. Robinson, E. Jackson, M. Cotton, J. Elias)
7. "Get Gone" (J. Austin, K. Hicks, B. Cox)
8. "Ideally Yours" (M. Cotton, C. Cotton, J. Green, L. Perry)
9. "All About You" (M. Cotton, J. Green, L. Perry, D. Scantlebury, M. Cooper, A. Crosley, L. McCall)
10. "Break Your Plans" (J. Robinson, J. Elias, J. Love)
11. "There's No Way" (J. Austin, T. Bishop, K. Hicks)
12. "Jealous Skies" (J. Thomas, J. Skinner, J. Thompson)
13. "Never Let You Go" (M. Cotton)
14. "Tell Me Why" (J. Walker, M. Cotton, C. Cotton, J. Green, L. Perry)
15. "No More" (J. Green, L. Perry)
16. "Pigeon" (Skit)
17. "Sexy Dancer" (P. Alexander, S. Watson, J. Smith)
18. "Get Gone [Remix Radio Version]" (J. Austin, K. Hicks, B. Cox)
19. "Outro" (M. Cotton, C. Cotton, J. Green, L. Perry, P. Alexander)

== Personnel ==
Credits adapted from liner notes.

- Keyboards and drum programming: Jazze Pha, Bryan-Michael Cox, Joe, Bishop "Stick" Burrell, PZ, Jon-John, J-Dub, Donnie Scantz, Teddy Bishop
- Guitar: Kevin Hicks
- Additional background vocals: Johnta Austin, Ericka "Babydoll" Jerry, Jazze Pha
- Recording engineer: Steve Durkee, Soloman Jackson, Kevin Hicks, Sinclair Ridley, Manny Marroquin, Adam Kudzin, Dave Aaron, Kevin "KD" Davis
- Mixing: Jazze Pha, Rick Camp, Manny Marroquin, Bishop "Stick" Burrell, Kevin "KD" Davis, Adam Kudzin
- Mastering: Eddy Schreyer
- Executive producer: Eric L. Brooks, Carmonique Roberts
- Photography: Reisig & Taylor, William Hanes
- Design: Jason Clark

== Samples ==
Credits adapted from liner notes.

- "Things You Can't Do" contains a sample of "The What", as performed by the Notorious B.I.G. featuring Method Man
- "Creep Inn" contains a sample of "This Place Hotel", as performed by the Jacksons
- "All About You" contains a sample of "Promise You Love", as performed by Con Funk Shun
- "Sexy Dancer" contains a sample of "New Beginning", as performed by Dexter Wansel
- "Whatever" contains a sample of "Get Down Saturday Night", as performed by Oliver Cheatham.

== Charts ==
=== Weekly charts ===
Chart (1999–2000)	Peak position
US Billboard 200	83
US Top R&B/Hip-Hop Albums (Billboard)	19

=== Year-end charts ===
Chart (2000)	Position
US Top R&B/Hip-Hop Albums (Billboard)	59
