= Keep It Real (Miilkbone song) =

Single by Miilkbone

from the album Da' Miilkrate
- B-side: "How Ya Like It?"
- Released: May 28, 1995
- Recorded: 1994
- Genre: East Coast hip hop • boom bap
- Length: 3:42
- Label: Capitol Records, Set It Off
- Producer: Mufi

Miilkbone singles chronology
"Keep It Real" (1995)	"Where'z Da' Party At ?" (1995)

"Keep It Real" is a song by American hip hop recording artist Miilkbone, released as the first single from his debut studio album Da' Miilkrate in 1995. The song reached number 81 on the Billboard U.S. R&B charts and received praise from The Source magazine. It is widely hailed as a classic song and is recognized for its unique piano sample which has been most famously used by rappers Big L and Jay Z on their legendary freestyle on the Stretch & Bobbito Show in 1995. Rapper Logic also used the beat for his song Young Sinatra III on his 2012 mixtape Young Sinatra: Undeniable.

== Formats and track listings ==
These are the formats and track listings of major single releases of "Keep It Real".

- CD Maxi single
1. "Keep It Real (Foul Mouth LP)
2. "Keep It Real (Instrumental)
3. "Keep It Real (Dirty Raw Shit)
4. "How Ya Like It? (Sour Milk LP)
5. "How Ya Like It? (Instrumental)
- 12" single
1. "Keep It Real (Foul Mouth LP)
2. "Keep It Real (Instrumental)
3. "Keep It Real (Dirty Raw Shit)
4. "Keep It Real (Censored LP)
5. "How Ya Like It ? (Sour Milk LP)
6. "How Ya Like It ? (Instrumental)
