= Whatever (Ideal song) =

Single by Ideal featuring Lil' Mo

from the album Ideal
- Released: September 11, 2000
- Recorded: 1999; The Battery Studios (New York City, NY)
- Genre: R&B
- Length: 3:48
- Label: Virgin Records
- Songwriters: K. Gist, E. Berkeley, K. Brown, R.L. Huggar, K. McCord, O. Cheatham
- Producers: Eddie Berkeley, Kier "KayGee" Gist, Kobie

Ideal singles chronology
"Creep Inn" (1999)	"Whatever" (2000)	"Makin' Time" (2004)

Lil' Mo singles chronology
"Ta Da" (2000)	"Whatever" (2000)	"I'll Trade (A Million Bucks)" (2000)

"Whatever" is the third and final single by R&B quintet Ideal from their self-titled debut album, Ideal (1999). The song features guest vocals by Lil' Mo and additional vocals and writing credits by Robert "R.L." Huggar (credited as R.L.-oquent) from the R&B trio Next. It also features production by Eddie Berkeley, Kobie and Kier "KayGee" Gist of Naughty by Nature. The song samples Oliver Cheatham's "Get Down Saturday Night".

In 2001, the song won an ASCAP Rhythm and Soul Music Award for "Award-Winning R&B/Hip-Hop Songs". To date, "Whatever" is the group's second and last-known successful single.

== Background ==
A demo for the song was originally recorded by KayGee and R.L. in the former's New Jersey basement studio. When the duo heard that Ideal needed an uptempo song, the demo was given to them and later went on to be re-recorded at The Battery Studios in New York City. Maverick Cotton, lead singer of Ideal, confirmed that the need for an uptempo song was due to the fact that "summertime [was] coming up," and the group "just wanted to make a summertime jam [that people] could ride through the summer with." However, because the group's self-titled debut had already been completed and released months prior to the single's finalization, Ideal confirmed that "Whatever" would see a release on the "future pressings of the [album]."

== Music video ==
On April 13 and 14 of 2000, the music video for the single was shot in Miami, Florida and directed by Darren Grant. It also featured cameo appearances by KayGee and R.L., however it excluded guest vocalist Lil' Mo due to undisclosed reasons. In late April 2000, the video premiered on BET.

== Track listings and formats ==
US 12" vinyl

1. "Whatever" (Club Mix) — 4:07
2. "Whatever" (Instrumental) — 3:40
3. "Whatever" (Richie Jones Revival Club Mix) — 8:11

UK CD single

1. "Whatever" (Radio Version) — 3:48
2. "Whatever" (Richie Jones Revival Radio Edit) — 3:40
3. "Whatever" (Club Mix) — 4:07
4. "Whatever" (Richie Jones Revival Club Mix) — 8:11

"House Mixes" (12")

1. "Whatever" (Jason Nevins Club Mix) — 7:21
2. "Whatever" (Dub A Lious Mix) — 7:50
3. "Whatever" (Club 2000) — 8:34
4. "Whatever" (Nevins Club Radio Edit) — 3:40
5. "Whatever" (Nevco Urban Remix) — 3:44
6. "Whatever" (Richie Jones Revival Club Mix) — 8:11
7. "Whatever" (Richie Jones Revival Radio Edit) — 3:40
8. "Whatever" (Richie Jones Revival Instrumental) — 8:18
9. "Whatever" (RJ Instru-Dub) — 6:38

== Charts ==
=== Weekly charts ===
Chart (2000)	Peak position
US Billboard Hot 100	47
US Hot R&B/Hip-Hop Songs (Billboard)	11
US Rhythmic Airplay (Billboard)	16

UK: #31

=== Year-end charts ===
Chart (2000)	Position
UK Urban (Music Week)	11
US Hot R&B/Hip-Hop Songs (Billboard)	42
