= Koffee Brown =

American contemporary R&B group

- Koffee Brown, 2001. Vee and Fonz.

Background information
- Origin: Minneapolis, Minnesota, U.S.
- Genres: R&B, neo soul
- Years active: 1997–2001, 2024–present
- Label: Arista
- Members: Ryan Lane; Vee
- Past members: Fonz

Koffee Brown is an American R&B and neo-soul duo consisting of male singer Ryan Lane and female singer Vernell "Vee" Sales. Originally consisted of Falonte "Fonz" Moore alongside Vee, they were discovered by music producer Kay Gee and RL of Next, and were signed to Arista Records. They are best known for their songs "After Party", and "Weekend Thing".

The duo reunited in 2024, with Ryan Lane replacing Fonz as the male singer in the duo. They released a cover of the Keith Sweat song "Make It Last Forever", alongside two new singles "About It", featuring Vin-Rock and "Simple Things"; set to be on their upcoming EP.

== Mars/Venus ==
Their first and only album, Mars/Venus, was released on March 6, 2001, and featured the single "After Party," which peaked at Number 44 on the Billboard Hot 100. The album itself peaked at Number 32 on the Billboard 200. It performed considerably better on Billboard's R&B Chart, however, peaking at Number 7.

== Discography ==
Year	Title	Chart positions	
Year	Title	U.S.	U.S. R&B
2001	Mars/Venus: Released: March 6, 2001; Label: Arista	32	7
