= Da' Miilkrate =

Studio album by Miilkbone
- Released: June 20, 1995
- Recorded: 1994–95
- Studios: Marion Studios (Fairview, New Jersey)
- Genre: Hip hop
- Length: 53:48
- Label: Capitol
- Producers: Gary Gersh (exec.); James "Pookie" Gist (exec.); Tracy Waples (exec.); Mufi; Nick Wiz; Butch Whip; KayGee; Steven White

Miilkbone chronology
Da' Miilkrate (1995)	U Got Miilk ? (2001)

Singles from Da' Miilkrate
- 1. "Keep It Real" Released: May 28, 1995; 2. "Where'z Da' Party At ?" Released: July 4, 1995

Professional ratings
Review scores
Source	Rating
AllMusic	2.5/5 stars
The Source	3/5 stars

Da' Miilkrate is the debut studio album by American rapper Miilkbone. It was released on June 20, 1995 through Capitol Records. Recording sessions took place at Marion Studios in Fairview, New Jersey. Production was handled by Mufi, Nick Wiz, KayGee, Butch Whip, Twig and Steve White. It features guest appearances from Kandi Kain, Middy and Trip. The album reached number 81 on the Top R&B/Hip-Hop Albums chart in the United States.

The album spawned two charting singles: "Keep It Real" and "Where'z Da' Party At ?", both of which were minor hits on the Hot Rap Songs chart. "Keep It Real" also reached No. 4 on the Bubbling Under Hot 100 singles chart.

== Track listing ==
No.	Title	Producer(s)	Length
1.	"No Gimmicks"		2:08
2.	"Ghettobiz"	Nick Wiz	3:58
3.	"Keep It Real"	Mufi	3:43
4.	"Mindgamez"	Nick Wiz	4:05
5.	"Traffic Jam"		1:00
6.	"Move Wit' Da' Groove"	Mufi; Twig	3:49
7.	"How Ya Like It?"	Nick Wiz	3:10
8.	"Freestyle" (featuring Kandi Kain & Middy)		0:50
9.	"Set It Off" (featuring Kandi Kain, Middy & Trip)	KayGee	3:21
10.	"Where'z Da' Party At ?"	KayGee	3:11
11.	"Murder Verbs"	Mufi	4:18
12.	"Fast Cash"		0:34
13.	"Kids on the Ave"	Mufi	3:30
14.	"Check Me Out"	Mufi; Butch Whip	3:32
15.	"Bamma Fam"		1:10
16.	"Ketchrek"	Mufi; Butch Whip	3:37
17.	"It Ain't the Same"	Steve White	4:24
18.	"2 All Y'All"	Mufi	3:51
19.	"Keep It Real" (Remix)	Nick Wiz	3:15
Total length:			53:48

== Charts ==
Chart (1995)	Peak position
US Top R&B/Hip-Hop Albums (Billboard)	81
