= RL (singer) =

American R&B singer

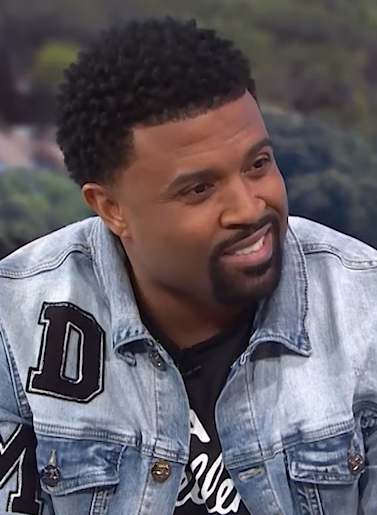
- RL in 2019

Background information
- Born: Robert Lavelle Huggar; Minnesota, U.S.
- Genres: R&B
- Occupations: Singer, songwriter
- Years active: 1997–present
- Labels: Arista (1997–2000) J (2001–2002); Interscope (2005–2006) Music World/Universal (2006–2007)
- Website: www.justrl.com

Robert Lavelle Huggar, better known by his initials RL, is an American singer and songwriter who gained fame as the lead singer of the R&B group Next.

== Early life ==
Robert Lavelle Huggar was born in Minneapolis, Minnesota, U.S.A.

== Next ==
Fronted by Huggar and brothers Terry Brown and Raphael Brown, Next was introduced to producer and DJ artist KayGee from Naughty by Nature. Subsequently, they signed with KayGee's newly formed Divine Mill record label, which, at the time, was distributed through Arista Records.

== Solo work ==
RL first distinguished himself outside of Next with his duet with Deborah Cox on the song "We Can't Be Friends" as well as other feature projects. RL followed up that effort with "The Best Man I Can Be", the super-group track from The Best Man movie soundtrack which also featured Ginuwine, Tyrese and Case. By the time RL's soulful "Good Love" (from The Brothers movie soundtrack) and his hook to 2Pac's Until the end of Time were released, he had created an artistic persona distinct and separate from Next. RL: Ements is RL's debut solo project and was released on J Records. It spawned the singles "Got Me a Model" (featuring Erick Sermon) and "Good Man".

== Personal life ==
Huggar has a son with his first wife.

In October 2017, he married Lena Danielle Chenier. Their eldest daughter was born in January 2018. In May 2025, their second daughter was born. In March 2025 he welcomed a granddaughter.

== Discography ==
=== Albums ===
Year	Title	Chart positions	
Year	Title	US	U.S. R&B
2002	RL: Ements: Released: April 23, 2002	53	6

=== Singles ===
Year	Song	Peak chart positions		Album
Year	Song	US	US R&B	Album
1999	"The Best Man I Can Be" (with Ginuwine, Tyrese and Case)	67	15	The Best Man: Music from the Motion Picture
1999	"We Can't Be Friends" (Deborah Cox featuring RL)	8	1	One Wish
2001	"Good Love"	-	58	The Brothers (soundtrack)
2002	"Got Me a Model" (featuring Erick Sermon)	-	76	RL: Ements
2002	"Good Man"	-	48	RL: Ements

=== As songwriter ===
Year	Song	Artist	Peak chart positions		Album
Year	Song	Artist	US	US R&B	Album
1999	"Party Tonight"	3rd Storee	—	66	3rd Storee
2000	"Whatever" (featuring Lil' Mo)	Ideal	47	11	Ideal
2000	"Where I Wanna Be" (featuring Nate Dogg & Kurupt)	Shade Sheist	95	49	Informal Introduction
2001	"Just in Case"	Jaheim	52	15	Ghetto Love
2002	"Anything"	Jaheim	28	6	Ghetto Love
"—" denotes a recording that did not chart.

=== Other notable songwriting credits ===
Year	Song	Artist	Album
2001	"Weekend Thing"	Koffee Brown	Mars/Venus
2001	"Bring Your Heart to Mine"	Luther Vandross	Luther Vandross
2001	"U R the One"	Usher	8701
2005	"Storm (Forecass)"	Jamie Foxx	Unpredictable
2008	"I Can Change Your Life"	Lloyd	Lessons in Love
2008	"The Floor"	Keith Sweat	Just Me
2008	"Sexiest Girl"	Keith Sweat	Just Me
2008	"Teach Me"	Keith Sweat	Just Me
2009	"Show Off"	Ginuwine	A Man's Thoughts
2009	"Open the Door"	Ginuwine	A Man's Thoughts
2009	"Orchestra"	Ginuwine	A Man's Thoughts
2009	"Touch Me"	Ginuwine	A Man's Thoughts
2009	"Even When I'm Mad"	Ginuwine	A Man's Thoughts
2012	"60 Seconds"	"Q" Parker	The Manual
2013	"Ready for Love"	Mindless Behavior	All Around the World
