= Ideal (group) =

American R&B quartet

- Origin: Houston, Texas, U.S.
- Genres: R&B
- Years active: 1995–2004
- Labels: Virgin (1998–2001); Neutral Ground/Universal (2004)
- Past members: Maverick "Mav" Cotton; Cedrick "Swab" Cotton (deceased); Wayne "PZ" Perry; Jay "J-Dante" Green

Ideal was an American R&B quartet from Houston, Texas. The group debuted in 1999 and was composed of brothers Maverick "Mav" and Cedrick "Swab" Cotton, their cousin Wayne "PZ" Perry, and high school friend Jay "J-Dante" Green, all graduates of Lamar High School in Houston. The group is best known for the songs "Creep Inn", "Get Gone", and "Whatever".

== Career ==
Ideal's eponymous debut album was released by Virgin Records on August 24, 1999. The album sold 615,000 units in the U.S., according to Nielsen SoundScan, and was certified Gold by the RIAA. Allmusic's Heather Phares called Ideal's initial effort a "heartfelt first album" which showcased the "group's smooth, sensuous vocal styling and romantic songwriting".

In 2004, the group signed with Neutral Ground/Universal Records and began work on their sophomore album, tentatively titled From Now On. Guest producers for the project were to include Bryan-Michael Cox, Rockwilder, Nisan Stewart, Mike City, and Battle Cat. The lead single was slated to be the Cee-Lo Green–featured "Makin' Time", however neither the single nor the album were released.

Cedrick "Swab" Cotton (born on May 31, 1974, in Houston, Texas) was fatally stabbed at a convenience store in Houston on February 9, 2021. He was 46.

== Discography and chart performance ==
=== Albums ===
Year	Statistics
1999	Ideal: Released: August 24, 1999; Label: Virgin; Peak Chart Positions: #83 (Billboard 200) #19 (Top R&B/Hip-Hop Albums)

=== Singles ===
Year	Single	Chart positions		Album
Year	Single	US	US R&B	Album
1996	"Inner City Blues (Make Me Wanna Holler)" (featuring Lil' Bud & Tizone)	—	94	Original Gangstas
1999	"Get Gone"	13	1	Ideal
1999	"Creep Inn"	—	60	Ideal
2000	"Whatever" (featuring Lil' Mo)	47	11	Ideal
