= Damizza =

American radio executive and record producer

Damion "Damizza" Young
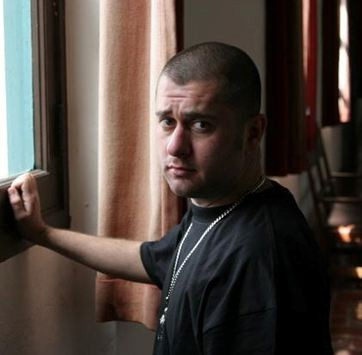
- Born: Damion Young; October 10, 1974 (age 51); Santa Barbara, California, U.S.
- Other names: Damizza
- Years active: 1986–present
- Notable work: Where I Wanna Be

Damion Young (born October 10, 1974), also known as Damizza, is an American radio executive, record producer, artist and author.

== Biography ==
Young began his career as a studio assistant at the age of 12, where Young went on to popularize numerous artists while working at Santa Barbara’s KHTY station, including Fiona Apple, Garbage and Hootie & the Blowfish, and later served as the head of Los Angeles’ Power 106 and New York’s Hot 97.

Young would later go on to produce Crybaby (Mariah Carey song) featuring Snoop Dogg. Young, has also worked with Dr. Dre, Ice Cube, and Korn.

Young would later go on to produce for artists Bone Thugs-n-Harmony, Lil Wayne and Ludacris, and claims a hand in the reunion of Dr. Dre and Snoop Dogg and the resulting 2001 (a.k.a. Chronic 2001).

Young was named the 4th most powerful person in hip-hop by The Source magazine 2 years after being named program director Power 106, after he helped Jay-Z find an international audience, helped Janet Jackson rekindle her career, helped Dr. Dre with advice on 'how to break the white kid from Detroit' and introduced the world to Eminem.

He completed working with J. Marshall Craig on a book on his life, Guilty By Association, which is scheduled for release sometime late-2011 after two years of delays over legal issues and made some public appearances at various California universities and colleges discussing the book and his life as a radio prodigy-turned hip-hop producer and performer. When Damizza was asked to give a brief insight to his book he said "A kid from a small town with a dream.. That never took no for an answer, made his dreams come true and did it his way. (With a Lil help from his grannie)".

In 2023 Damion "Damizza" Young was included in Marquis Who's Who.

== Awards/chart positions ==
- Damizza Presents... Where I Wanna Be: The Compilation no. 28 R&B/Hip-Hop no. 143 Billboard 200
