= Miilkbone =

American rapper (born 1974)

Background information
- Born: Thomas Wlodarczyk; March 4, 1974 (age 52); Perth Amboy, New Jersey, U.S.
- Genres: Hip-hop
- Occupations: Rapper; songwriter
- Years active: 1991–2003, 2015–present
- Labels: Capitol; Lightyear; Xcaliber; Set It Off Records

Thomas Wlodarczyk (born March 4, 1974), better known by his stage name Miilkbone, is an American rapper and songwriter.

== Career ==
Miilkbone began his career by recording cassettes with Biz Markie, eventually becoming an affiliate of Naughty by Nature. He signed a record deal with Capitol Records in 1993 and released his debut album, Da' Miilkrate on June 21, 1995. The album featured two singles, "Keep It Real", and "Where'z Da' Party At ?", which were minor hits on the rap charts.

After a four-year hiatus caused by the shutting down of Capitol's urban department, Miilkbone resurfaced in 1999, appearing on Death Row Records' Chronic 2000 compilation. His track, "Presenting Miilkbone" was an answer record to Eminem's "Just Don't Give a Fuck", in which the latter attacked several other white rappers and said he would "crush a Miilkbone". Two years later, Miilkbone released his second album U Got Miilk ? through Lightyear Entertainment. He then dropped out of the public eye to spend more time with his wife and son.

In March 2014, Miilkbone announced that he had begun working on his third studio album Voice of Reason. On February 28, 2015, Miilkbone released his first mixtape titled "Da Miilktape" through Struggle Enterprise as a teaser for the upcoming album. Voice of Reason was released on October 20, 2015, through Black Island Music and The Orchard/Sony, and features guest appearances by Chino XL, Black Rob, Uncle Murda, and Treach.

== Discography ==
=== Studio albums ===
Year	Album	Peak chart positions
Year	Album	U.S. R&B
1995	Da' Miilkrate: Released: June 21, 1995; Label: Capitol	81
2001	U Got Miilk ?: Released: April 17, 2001; Label: Xcaliber	–
2015	Voice of Reason: Release: October 20, 2015; Label: Black Island Music Powered by MCFL/Mizz CarrerA'Z Fast Life Entertainment	–

=== Singles ===
Year	Single	Chart positions		Album
Year	Single	U.S. R&B	U.S. Rap	Album
1995	"Keep It Real"	—	32	Da' Miilkrate
1995	"Where'z Da' Party At ?"	86	26	Da' Miilkrate
1999	"Da' Truth"	—	—	Son of Jurel Sampler
1999	"Presenting Miilkbone"	—	—	Suge Knight Represents: Chronic 2000
2001	"Yes Yes Y'all"	—	—	U Got Miilk ?
2001	"Dear Slim"	—	—	U Got Miilk ?
2001	"A Few Good Men"	—	—	U Got Miilk ?
2001	"Yesterday"	—	—	U Got Miilk ?
