= Naughty by Nature discography =

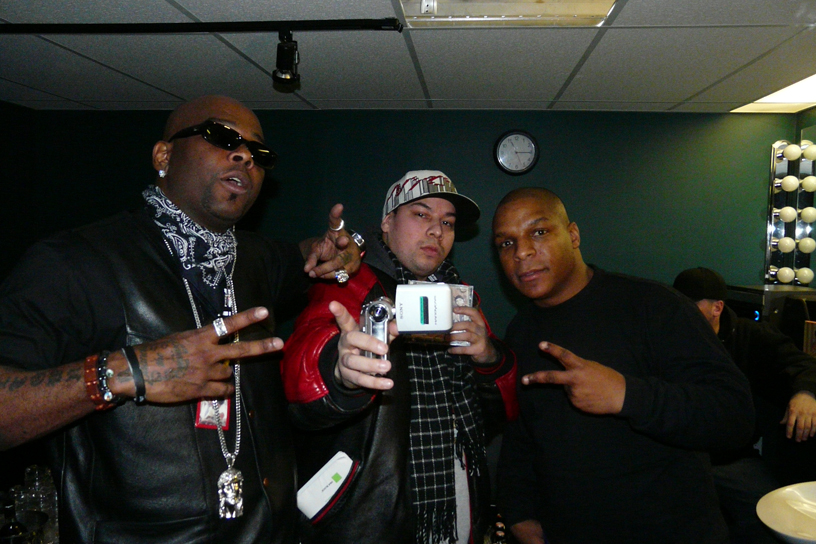
- Naughty by Nature members Treach (left) and Vin Rock (right) in Toronto, 2009
- Studio albums: 7
- Compilation albums: 2
- Singles: 18

American hip hop group Naughty by Nature have released seven studio albums, two compilation albums and eighteen singles.

== Albums ==
=== Studio albums ===
List of studio albums, with selected chart positions and certifications
Title	Album details	Peak chart positions								Certifications
Title	Album details	US	US R&B	AUS	GER	NLD	NZ	SWI	UK	Certifications
Independent Leaders (as The New Style)	Released: December 5, 1989; Label: MCA; Formats: CD, LP, cassette, digital download	—	—	—	—	—	—	—	—	
Naughty by Nature	Released: September 3, 1991 (US); Label: Tommy Boy; Formats: CD, LP, cassette, digital download	16	10	—	—	—	—	—	—	RIAA: Platinum; MC: Gold
19 Naughty III	Released: April 13, 1993 (US); Label: Tommy Boy; Formats: CD, LP, cassette, digital download	3	1	74	41	64	42	40	40	RIAA: Platinum; MC: Gold
Poverty's Paradise	Released: May 2, 1995 (US); Label: Tommy Boy; Formats: CD, LP, cassette, digital download	3	1	37	39	—	26	44	20	RIAA: Gold
Nineteen Naughty Nine: Nature's Fury	Released: April 27, 1999 (US); Label: Arista; Formats: CD, LP, cassette, digital download	22	9	43	94	—	—	—	173	RIAA: Gold
IIcons	Released: May 7, 2002 (US); Label: TVT; Formats: CD, LP, digital download	15	5	77	—	—	17	—	—	
Anthem Inc.	Released: December 13, 2011 (US); Label: E1; Formats: CD, digital download	—	—	—	—	—	—	—	—	
"—" denotes a recording that did not chart or was not released in that territory.

=== Compilation albums ===
List of compilation albums, with selected chart positions
Title	Album details	Peak chart positions	
Title	Album details	US R&B	NZ
Nature's Finest: Naughty by Nature's Greatest Hits	Released: March 9, 1999 (US); Label: Tommy Boy; Formats: CD, LP, cassette, digital download	92	15
Greatest Hits: Naughty's Nicest	Released: June 10, 2003 (US); Label: Rhino; Formats: CD, LP, digital download	—	—
"—" denotes a recording that did not chart or was not released in that territory.

=== Mixtapes ===
List of mixtapes
Title	Album details
Naughty by Nature: Tha Mixtape	Released: September 21, 2010 (US); Label: Illtown; Format: Digital download

== Singles ==
List of singles, with selected chart positions and certifications, showing year released and album name
Title	Year	Peak chart positions										Certifications	Album
Title	Year	US	US R&B	US Rap	US Dance	AUS	GER	NLD	NZ	SWI	UK	Certifications	Album
"Scuffin' Those Knees" (as The New Style)	1989	—	—	—	—	—	—	—	—	—	—		Independent Leaders
"O.P.P."	1991	6	5	1	7	31	25	20	11	6	35	RIAA: 2× Platinum	Naughty by Nature
"Everything's Gonna Be Alright"	1992	53	12	9	—	76	—	—	13	—	76		Naughty by Nature
"Uptown Anthem"	1992	—	58	27	—	—	—	—	—	—	—		Naughty by Nature / Juice (soundtrack)
"Hip Hop Hooray"	1993	8	1	3	9	33	19	21	6	—	20	RIAA: Platinum; RMNZ: Gold	19 Naughty III
"It's On"	1993	74	43	—	—	51	—	—	34	—	48		19 Naughty III
"Written on Ya Kitten"	1993	93	53	—	—	—	—	—	30	—	—		19 Naughty III
"Craziest"	1995	51	27	5	—	54	—	—	6	—	—		Poverty's Paradise
"Feel Me Flow"	1995	17	17	3	—	89	—	—	11	—	23	RIAA: Gold	Poverty's Paradise
"Clap Yo Hands"	1995	105 (Note: "Clap Yo Hands" did not enter the Billboard Hot 100, but peaked at number five on the Bubbling Under Hot 100 Singles chart.)	70	33	—	98	—	—	17	—	—		Poverty's Paradise
"Mourn You Til I Join You"	1997	51	24	2	—	61	—	—	11	—	—		Ride (soundtrack)
"Dirt All by My Lonely"	1999	—	— (Note: "Dirt All by My Lonely" did not enter the Hot R&B/Hip-Hop Songs chart, but peaked at number nine on the Bubbling Under R&B/Hip-Hop Singles chart.)	—	—	—	—	—	—	—	—		Nineteen Naughty Nine: Nature's Fury
"Live or Die" (featuring Master P, Mystikal, Silkk the Shocker and Phiness)	1999	—	86	—	—	—	—	—	—	—	—		Nineteen Naughty Nine: Nature's Fury
"Jamboree" (featuring Zhané)	1999	10	4	1	—	74	—	—	22	—	51	RIAA: Gold	Nineteen Naughty Nine: Nature's Fury
"Holiday"	1999	—	— (Note: "Holiday" did not enter the Hot R&B/Hip-Hop Songs chart, but peaked at number one on the Bubbling Under R&B/Hip-Hop Singles chart.)	—	—	8	—	—	—	—	—	ARIA: Platinum	Nineteen Naughty Nine: Nature's Fury
"Feels Good (Don't Worry Bout a Thing)" (featuring 3LW)	2002	53	25	14	—	34	—	—	19	—	44		IIcons
"Flags" (featuring Jaheim and Balewa Muhammad)	2010	—	—	—	—	—	—	—	—	—	—		Anthem Inc.
"Perfect Party" (featuring Joe)	2011	—	—	—	—	—	—	—	—	—	—		Anthem Inc.
"—" denotes a recording that did not chart or was not released in that territory.

== Music videos ==
- 1991: "O.P.P"
- 1992: "Everything's Gonna Be Alright"
- 1992: "Uptown Anthem"
- 1993: "Hip Hop Hooray"
- 1993: "It's On"
- 1993: "Written on Ya Kitten"
- 1995: "Craziest"
- 1995: "Feel Me Flow"
- 1995: "Clap Yo Hands"
- 1995: "Chain Remains"
- 1995: "Hang Out and Hustle" (featuring G-Luv of Road Dawgs and I Face Finsta of Cruddy Click)
- 1995: "Klickow Klickow" (featuring Rottin Razkals, Cruddy Click and Road Dawgs)
- 1997: "Mourn You Til I Join You"
- 1998: "Work" (featuring Mag and Castro)
- 1999: "Dirt All By My Lonely"
- 1999: "Live or Die" (featuring Master P, Silkk the Shocker, Mystikal and Phiness)
- 1999: "Jamboree" (featuring Zhané)
- 1999: "Holiday" (featuring Phiness)
- 1999: "Naughty by Nature" (Megamix)
- 2002: "Feels Good (Don't Worry 'Bout a Thing)" (featuring 3LW)
- 2010: "I Gotta Lotta"
- 2010: "Heavy in My Chevy"
- 2011: "Flags" (featuring Balewa Muhammad)
- 2011: "Perfect Party" (featuring Joe)
- 2016: "God Is Us"

== Treach guest appearances ==
Year	Song	Artist(s)	Album
1991	"Time to Flow"	D-Nice	To tha Rescue
1993	"5 Deadly Venomz"	2Pac, Apache, and Live Squad	Strictly 4 My N.I.G.G.A.Z...
1993	"Poor Man's Poetry"	—N/a	Poetic Justice (soundtrack)
1993	"Crewz Pop"	Da Youngstas	The Aftermath
1993	"Rough..."	Queen Latifah, KRS-One, Heavy D & The Boyz	Black Reign
1993	Roll wit the Flava	Queen Latifah, Freddie Foxxx & Chip Fu	Roll wit the Flava
1993	Bring It On	—N/a	Roll wit the Flava
1994	"Loyal to the Game"	2Pac, Riddler	Above the Rim (soundtrack)
1995	"No Peace"	South Central Cartel, Spice 1, Boss, Ice-T, Powerlord JEL	Murder Squad Nationwide
1995	"Batter Up"	Rottin Razkals, Bad News, Headache, Road Dawgs, Steel Handler	Rottin ta da Core
1995	"Life of a Bastard"	Rottin Razkals	Rottin ta da Core
1995	"Scream" (Naughty Remix)	Michael Jackson & Janet Jackson	12"
1995	"Sowhatusayin"	Jayo Felony, MC Eiht, Sh'killa, South Central Cartel, Spice 1, L.V.	The Show (soundtrack)
1995	"Vibin' (The New Flava)"	Boyz II Men, Busta Rhymes, Craig Mack and Method Man	The Remix Collection
1996	"A Girl Like You"	Aaliyah	One in a Million
1996	"Ain't Nobody"	Monica	The Nutty Professor (soundtrack)
1996	"Throw Your Hands Up"	L.V.	I Am L.V.
1997	"Nothin to Lose (Naughty Live)	—N/a	Nothing to Lose (soundtrack)
1997	"Penetration"	Next	Rated Next / Money Talks (soundtrack)
1998	"Freaky Tonight"	Elements of Life	—N/a
1998	"Work"	Mag	Butter (soundtrack)
1998	"Butta Love (You Got the Love Remix)"	Next, Castro	Too Close EP
1998	"Brooklyn/Jersey Get Wild"	M.O.P.	First Family 4 Life
1998	"Dirty South, Dirty Jerz"	Mystikal	Ghetto Fabulous
1999	"Make My Day"	RBX	No Mercy, No Remorse
1999	"Party Tonight"	3rd Storee, RL	3rd Storee
1999	"Thugz All Over da World"	Krayzie Bone	Thug Mentality 1999
2000	"Gangsta Rap"	Crooked I, Kurupt & Scarface	Too Gangsta for Radio
2000	"U Know What's Up" (Millennium Rapdown Remix)	Donell Jones, Xzibit, Pharoahe Monch, Fat Joe, Cuban Link, 50 Cent	12"
2000	"Island Boy"	Red Rat, Italee	I'm a Big Kid Now
2000	"Nutty by Nature"	Boo-Yaa T.R.I.B.E.	Mafia Lifestyle
2001	"Educated Fools"	Damian Marley, Bunny Wailer & Bounty Killer	Halfway Tree
2001	"Niggaz Know"	Guru	Baldhead Slick & da Click
2001	"Thug Love"	Da Beatminerz	Brace 4 Impak
2001	"Real Niggaz"	Redman, Scarface, Mally G & Icarus	Malpractice
2002	"Break Me Off"	Luniz, IMX	Silver & Black
2002	"Put Em Up"	3LW	A Girl Can Mack
2002	"Christmas Party"	3LW	Naughty or Nice
2005	"Real Life"	Bone Brothers	Bone Brothers
2008	"Some of Us Got 2 Rob"	Sticky Fingaz, Mr. D	United Statez Getto
2010	"Out to Lunch"	Celph Titled & Buckwild	Nineteen Ninety Now
2010	"Goin' to War"	El Da Sensei & The Returners	Nu World
2011	"Thank You"	Volta Masters, DOUBLE, DoitAll	Suite
2011	"Encore"	Rappin' 4-Tay, Montel Jordan, Mac Mall	Still Standing Vol. 1
2011	"Step Back"	Harlem 6	Global Attack Mixtape, Vol. 1
2011	"Negrociations"	DoitAll	American DU
2011	"Certified"	Peter Jackson	No Talking
2012	"Home of tha Rydahz"	Young Noble	Outlaw Rydahz Vol. 1
2020	"Naughty By Nature"	Burna Boy	Twice as Tall
2022	"Entourage"	Truth, Ras Kass, Large Professor, Tragedy Khadafi, Joe Fatal	Entourage
2024	"Lite It Up"	Redman, Shaquille O'Neal, Rah Digga, Queen Latifah	Muddy Waters 2

=== Featured music videos ===
- 1991 D-Nice - "Time to Flow"
- 1993 Da Youngstas - "Crews Pop"
- 1993 Flavor Unit - "Roll wit the Flava"
- 1995 Boyz II Men, Busta Rhymes, Craig Mack and Method Man – "Vibin' (The New Flava)"
- 1995 South Central Cartel, Spice 1, Boss, Ice-T, Powerlord JEL – "No Peace"
- 1996 L.V.– "Throw Your Hands Up"
- 1996 Monica– "Ain't Nobody"
- 1999 3rd Storee, RL – "Party Tonight"
- 2011 Peter Jackson – "Certified"

=== Cameo appearances ===
- 1991 Michael Jackson – "Jam"
- 1993 RUN-DMC – "Down with the King"
- 1994 Salt-n-Pepa – "Whatta Man"
- 1994 The Notorious B.I.G. - "Big Poppa"
- 1995 2Pac – "Temptations"
- 1998 Gang Starr – "Royalty"
