= Nature's Finest =

Nature's Finest: Naughty by Nature's Greatest Hits

Greatest hits album by Naughty by Nature
- Released: March 9, 1999
- Recorded: 1991–1999
- Genre: Hip hop
- Label: Tommy Boy
- Producer: Naughty by Nature

Naughty by Nature chronology
Nature's Finest: Naughty by Nature's Greatest Hits (1999)	Naughty's Nicest (2003)

Professional ratings
Review scores
Source	Rating
Allmusic	4.5/5 stars
Q	3/5 stars
The Rolling Stone Album Guide	4/5 stars
Vibe	(favorable)

Nature's Finest: Naughty by Nature's Greatest Hits is a greatest hits album from Naughty by Nature, released on March 9, 1999, by Tommy Boy Records. The compilation contains songs from the group's second, third and fourth albums that they released while with Tommy Boy, as well as four songs from the soundtracks to Juice, Poetic Justice, Nothing to Lose and Ride. It peaked at #92 on Billboard's Top R&B/Hip-Hop Albums chart.

== Track listing ==
1. "Hip Hop Hooray"
2. "O.P.P."
3. "Uptown Anthem"
4. "Penetration" (Feat. Next)
5. "Everything's Gonna Be Alright"
6. "It's On"
7. "Craziest (Crazy C Remix)"
8. "Written on Ya Kitten (QD III Remix)"
9. "Feel Me Flow"
10. "Clap Yo Hands (Remix)"
11. "Nothing to Lose (Naughty Live)"
12. "Guard Your Grill"
13. "1, 2, 3"
14. "Poor Man's Poetry"
15. "Wickedest Man Alive"
16. "Naughty by Nature (The Megamix)"
17. "Mourn You Til I Join You"
- Track 3 is taken from the soundtrack to the 1992 film Juice.
- Track 11 is taken from the soundtrack to the 1997 film Nothing To Lose.
- Track 14 is taken from the soundtrack to the 1993 film Poetic Justice.
- Track 17 is taken from the soundtrack to the 1998 film Ride.

== Album chart positions ==
Chart (1999)	Peak position
Billboard Top R&B/Hip Hop Albums	92
