= Road Dawgs =

American hip hop duo

- Origin: Los Angeles, California, U.S.
- Genres: Hip-Hop
- Years active: 1993–2002
- Label: Hoo-Bangin' / Virgin
- Members: G-Luv; Tru Gee Swamp Rat

The Road Dawgs were an American hip hop duo composed of G-Luv and Swamp Rat. They started their career as associates of Naughty by Nature in 1993. They then signed a deal with Mack 10's Hoo-Bangin' Records in the late 90s and issued their only album in 1999 entitled Don't Be Saprize.

The duo first appeared on Naughty by Nature's "Klickow-Klickow" with the Rottin Razkals in 1993. The song appeared as a B-Side on the "Written on Ya Kitten" single but it was left off the 19 Naughty III album. "Klickow-Klickow" instead appeared on Naughty's next album, Poverty's Paradise in 1995. The Road Dawgs also appeared on "Hang Out and Hustle" and "Connections" on that album and on the Rottin Razkals debut album, Rottin ta da Core, that same year.

After appearing on several soundtracks including from 1996 to 1999, the Road Dawgs then released their debut album on March 23, 1999. Though the album featured guest appearances from big names such as Ice Cube and Mack 10, it was a commercial flop and only made it to No. 91 on the Billboard Top R&B/Hip-Hop Albums. After Don't Be Saprize, they appeared on the Thicker than Water soundtrack later in the year, but were not heard of again until they reunited with Naughty by Nature and the Rottin Razkals on "N.J. to L.A." from Naughty's 2002 album IIcons. The song remains Road Dawgs final appearance to date.

== Trivia ==
G-Luv was a member of the Queen Street Blood Gang.

== Discography ==
=== Album ===
| Year | Title | Chart positions |
| Year | Title | U.S. R&B |
|---|---|---|
| 1999 | Don't Be Saprize: Released: March 23, 1999; Label: Hoo-Bangin' / Virgin | 91 |

=== Guest appearances ===
- "Klickow-Klickow", "Hang Out and Hustle" and "Connections" (from the 1995 Naughty by Nature album Poverty's Paradise)
- "Batter Up", "Frustration" and "Lik a Shot" (from the 1995 Rottin Razkals album Rottin ta da Core)
- "Danger" (from the 1996 soundtrack The Substitute)
- "You Don't Want None" (from the 1998 soundtrack Caught Up)
- "Bang or Ball" (from the 1998 soundtrack I Got the Hook Up)
- "Gang Bang" (from the 1999 soundtrack Thicker than Water)
- "N.J. to L.A." (from the 2002 Naughty by Nature album IIcons)
