= Dirt All by My Lonely =

"Dirt All By My Lonely"

Single by Naughty by Nature

from the album Nineteen Naughty Nine: Nature's Fury
- B-side: "Dirt All By My Lonely"
- Released: March 23, 1999
- Recorded: 1998
- Genre: Hip hop
- Length: 3:14
- Label: Arista
- Songwriter(s): Anthony Criss, Vincent Brown, Kier Gist, Les McCann
- Producer(s): Naughty by Nature

Naughty by Nature singles chronology
"Mourn You Til I Join You" (1997)	"Dirt All By My Lonely" (1999)	"Live or Die" (1999)

"Dirt All By My Lonely" is the first single released from Naughty by Nature's fifth album, Nineteen Naughty Nine: Nature's Fury. It was the least successful single released from the album, only making it to 9 on the Bubbling Under R&B/Hip-Hop Singles (or 109 on the Hot R&B/Hip-Hop Singles & Tracks).

== Single track listing ==
=== A-Side ===
1. "Dirt All By My Lonely" (Radio Mix)- 3:14
2. "Dirt All By My Lonely" (TV track)- 3:14

=== B-Side ===
1. "Dirt All By My Lonely" (Club Mix)- 3:14
2. "Dirt All By My Lonely" (Acappella))- 2:54
