= Anthem Inc. (album) =

Studio album by Naughty by Nature
- Released: December 13, 2011
- Recorded: 2010–2011
- Studio: Pulse Music (New York, NY)
- Genre: Hip-hop
- Length: 1:06:30
- Label: Illtown; eOne
- Producer: Adam Miele; A-Rex; Brian "BK" Coleman; DJ Kay Gee; Esteban Crandle; Rob Lewis; Tramp Baby; Young Boyz

Naughty by Nature chronology
IIcons (2002)	Anthem Inc. (2011)

Singles from Anthem Inc.
- 1. "Flags" Released: September 23, 2010; 2. "Perfect Party" Released: September 20, 2011

Professional ratings
Review scores
Source	Rating
AllMusic	3/5 stars
HipHopDX	3.5/5

Anthem Inc. is the seventh studio album by American hip-hop trio Naughty by Nature. It was released in December 2011 via Illtown Records and eOne. Produced by the returning member DJ KayGee, Tramp Baby, Brian "BK" Coleman, Rob Lewis, Youngboyz, Adam Miele, A-Rex and Esteban "Cito" Crandle, the album marks Naughty by Nature's reunion and the group's twentieth anniversary. It features guest appearances from Black, DoItAll, Balewa Muhammad, B. Wells, Dueja, Fam, Joe, Kate Nauta, Queen Latifah, Sonny Black, Syleena Johnson and Tah G Ali.

Prior to Anthem Inc., in 2010 the trio released an extended play and a single for the song "Flags". Scheduled to be released in Summer 2010, the release date was postponed to it was postponed to November 15, 2011, due to label politics. The album's tracklist and cover art were revealed in October 2011.

== Track listing ==
No.	Title	Writer(s)	Producer(s)	Length
1.	"Anthem Inc. (Intro)"			0:37
2.	"Naughty Nation"	Anthony Criss; Keir Gist; Terence Abney; Marcella Brailsford	KayGee; Tramp Baby	3:34
3.	"Throw It Up" (featuring Tah G Ali)	Criss; Gist; Rob Lewis; Dontae Winslow; Abney	KayGee; Rob Lewis	3:57
4.	"I Gotta Lotta" (featuring Sonny Black)	Criss; Gist; Abney; Brailsford	KayGee; Tramp Baby	3:39
5.	"Perfect Party" (featuring Joe)	Criss; Gist; Abney; Lewis	KayGee; Tramp Baby; Rob Lewis	4:09
6.	"Flags" (featuring Balewa Muhammad)	Criss; Gist; Balewa Muhammad; Abney; Brailsford	KayGee; Tramp Baby	3:31
7.	"Name Game (Remember)" (featuring Kate Nauta)	Criss; Gist; Abney; Adam Miele; Brailsford	KayGee; Tramp Baby; Adam Miele	3:38
8.	"God Is Us" (featuring Queen Latifah)	Criss; Gist; Abney; Brian Keith Coleman; Raymond Angry; Brailsford; Christopher Mapp; Eritza Laues	KayGee; Tramp Baby; Brian "BK" Coleman	3:47
9.	"Gunz & Butta" (featuring DoItAll, Black, Dueja and B. Wells)	Criss; Gist; Dupré Kelly; Malik Hall; Samuel Mobley; Samuel Wells; Andrew Williams; Esteban Crandle; Coleman; Abney	KayGee; Young Boyz	4:12
10.	"I Know What It's Like"	Criss; Gist; Hyuk Shin; Sean Hamilton; Brailsford; Abney	KayGee; A-Rex	4:52
11.	"Ride"	Criss; Gist; Coleman; Williams; Abney	KayGee; Brian "BK" Coleman; Young Boyz	4:05
12.	"Impeach the Planet" (featuring DoItAll, Black and Fam)	Criss; Gist; Kelly; Hall; Abdullah Barr; Abney; Coleman; Crandle	KayGee; Tramp Baby; Brian "BK" Coleman; Cito	3:57
13.	"Doozit" (featuring Syleena Johnson)	Criss; Gist; Syleena Johnson; Abney; Lewis; Mapp; Laues; Brailsford	KayGee; Tramp Baby; Rob Lewis	3:37
14.	"Uptown Anthem" (20th Anniversary Version)	Criss; Vincent Brown; Gist		3:02
15.	"Hip Hop Hooray" (20th Anniversary Version)	Criss; Brown; Gist; Ronald Isley; Rudolph Isley; Ernest Isley; Marvin Isley; Kelly Isley; Christopher Jasper		4:11
16.	"O.P.P." (20th Anniversary Version)	Criss; Brown; Gist; Berry Gordy; Dennis Lussier; Alphonso Mizell; Frederick Perren		4:10
17.	"Feel Me Flow" (20th Anniversary Version)	Criss; Brown; Gist; Arthur Neville; Cyril Neville; George Porter; Joseph Modeliste; Leo Nocentelli		3:21
18.	"Everything's Gonna Be Alright" (20th Anniversary Version)	Criss; Brown; Gist; Vincent Ford		4:11
Total length:				1:06:30

Japanese edition bonus track
No.	Title	Writer(s)	Length
19.	"Jamboree" (20th Anniversary Version)	Criss; Brown; Gist; Benny Golson	3:20

iTunes bonus track
No.	Title	Length
19.	"Perfect Party" (Instrumental)	4:08
20.	"Name Game" (Instrumental)	3:36
21.	"God Is Us" (Instrumental)	3:47

== Personnel ==
- Anthony "Treach" Criss – vocals, executive producer
- Vinnie "Vin Rock" Brown – vocals, executive producer
- Kier "DJ KayGee" Gist – scratches (tracks: 16, 18), producer, recording (tracks: 2, 9, 11, 12), executive producer
- Tah G Ali – vocals (track 3)
- Christopher "Cannon" Mapp – additional vocals (tracks: 3, 10)
- Sonny Black – vocals (track 4)
- Joseph "Joe" Thomas – vocals (track 5)
- Balewa Muhammad – vocals (track 6)
- Kate Nauta – vocals (track 7)
- Dana "Queen Latifah" Owens – vocals (track 8)
- Dupré "DoItAll" Kelly – vocals (tracks: 9, 12)
- Black – vocals (track 9)
- Dueja – vocals (track 9)
- B. Wells – vocals (track 9)
- FAM – vocals (track 12)
- Syleena Johnson – vocals (track 13)
- Ike Graham – intro vocals (track 15)
- Marcella "Precise" Brailsford – additional vocals (track 16)
- Jason Dendy – additional vocals (track 16)
- Kortland Jackson – additional vocals (track 16)
- Adam Miele – backing vocals & additional guitar (track 18), live guitar (tracks: 7, 8), keyboards (tracks: 7, 10, 18), producer (track 7), recording (tracks: 4, 6–8, 13), mixing (track 4)
- Antonia Saint Dunbar – backing vocals (track 18)
- Eritza E. Laues – backing vocals (track 18)
- Renée Neufville – vocals (track 19)
- Rob Lewis – keyboards (tracks: 2, 3, 5, 8, 13, 14, 16–19), producer (tracks: 3, 5, 13)
- Dontae Winslow – live flute & live horns (track 3)
- Esteban "Cito" Crandle – keyboards (tracks: 4, 9, 12), producer (track 12)
- Terence "Trampbaby" Abney – keyboards (track 4), scratches (track 13), producer (tracks: 2, 4–8, 12, 13), recording (tracks: 2, 3, 5, 7, 9, 11, 12, 18), associate producer
- Chris Davies – live drums (track 6), additional guitar (track 15), recording (tracks: 5, 18), mixing (tracks: 2, 3, 5, 7–19)
- Raymond Angry – keyboards (tracks: 6, 8, 15–19)
- Louis Cato – live guitar & live bass (tracks: 6, 14–19)
- Jay Lifton – live saxophone (track 6)
- Andrew Williams – keyboards (tracks: 9, 11)
- Hyuk Shin – keyboards & producer (track 10)
- Sean Hamilton – keyboards & producer (track 10)
- Brian "BK" Coleman – scratches (track 12), producer (tracks: 8, 11, 12)
- Gerald Johnson – live horns (tracks: 13, 19)
- Kevin Batchelor – live horns (tracks: 13, 19)
- Joel Kipnis – live guitar (track 16)
- Young Boyz – producers (tracks: 9, 11)
- Nat "DJ Gizmo" Robinson – mixing (track 6)
- Rebekah Foster – executive producer
- Paul Grosso – creative director, design
- @Wondertwinz – logo design
- Maynard Snyder – photography
- Bob Perry – A&R
- Marleny Dominguez – A&R
