= Don't Be Saprize =

Studio album by Road Dawgs
- Released: March 23, 1999
- Recorded: 1998–99
- Genre: Hip hop
- Length: 49:23
- Label: Noo Trybe
- Producer: Mack 10 (exec.); Binky Mack; Clint "Payback" Sands; Darren Lighty; Greg Royal; KayGee; Rick "Dutch" Cousin; Road Dawgs

Don't Be Saprize is the debut studio album by American hip hop duo Road Dawgs. It was released on March 23, 1999 through Noo Trybe Records. Production was handled by Mr. Payback, Greg Royal, Binky Mack, Darren Lighty, KayGee, Rick "Dutch" Cousin, and Road Dawgs themselves, with Mack 10 serving as executive producer. It features guest appearances from Mack 10, Ice Cube, Squeak Ru, Boo Kapone, Boobie, MC Eiht, Ms. Toi, Q.S.-Bandit, Vernell Sales and Young Pretty.

== Background ==
The Road Dawgs first started out in 1993 and, along with the Rottin Razkals, were closely associated with Naughty by Nature. The duo appeared on several songs by Naughty by Nature and Rottin Razkals in 1993 and 1995 but were unable to get a record deal. In 1998 the duo began working with Mack 10 and signed a deal with Virgin Records, who placed the Road Dawgs in its sublabel Noo Trybe. The duo then began work on their debut album, Don't Be Saprize.

The album's lone single was "Bouncin'", it also had a promotional music video released for it. Mack 10 performed the chorus for the song and also appeared in the video.

== Reception ==
Professional ratings
Review scores
Source	Rating
AllMusic	1.5/5 stars
The Source	3/5 stars

Don't be Saprize was neither a critical nor commercial success. It peaked at No. 91 on the Billboard's Top R&B/Hip-Hop Albums chart.

AllMusic's Jon Azpiri thought that "[t]he group seems incapable of creating a consistent album. Lyrically, many of the tracks on the album, like "Gangbang Shit" and "Murderfest 99, wallow in ignorance. Aside from the single "Bouncin," there is little to recommend on this album." Hannibal Tabu's review for The Source was more favorable. He called Don't Be Saprize "an enjoyable gangster rap album" that "shows some solid musicianship plus industry cred". He commended the group's vocal performance, highlighting unique delivery of each member.

== Track listing ==
No.	Title	Producer(s)	Length
1.	"The Block (Intro)"		0:27
2.	"Bouncin'" (featuring Mack 10)	Road Dawgs	4:42
3.	"Bonifide" (featuring Ms. Toi)	Clint "Payback" Sands; Road Dawgs (co.)	3:24
4.	"Gang Bang Shit" (featuring Squeak Ru and Mack 10)	Greg Royal	4:51
5.	"Break Yourself" (featuring Vernell Sales)	Darren Lighty; KayGee	4:04
6.	"Qrown Me" (featuring Squeak Ru)	Clint "Payback" Sands	4:36
7.	"Murderfest 99" (featuring Mack 10, Ice Cube, MC Eiht, Boo Kapone and Boobie)	Rick "Dutch" Cousin	4:42
8.	"Match Made"	Clint "Payback" Sands; Road Dawgs (co.)	4:05
9.	"Do a Lick (Guns) (Interlude)"		0:35
10.	"My Life" (featuring Sharon)	Binky Mack	4:35
11.	"You Ain't Know" (featuring Ice Cube, Mack 10, Q.S.-Bandit and Young Pretty)	Clint "Payback" Sands	3:34
12.	"Klientel"	Greg Royal	5:17
13.	"Interlude: Sick the Dawgs" (featuring Mack 10)		0:16
14.	"Don't Be Saprize"	Road Dawgs	4:15
Total length:			49:23

== Personnel ==
- Jonte "G-Luv" Ray – vocals, percussion (track 11), producer (tracks: 2, 14), co-producer (tracks: 3, 8), mixing (tracks: 2–8, 10–12, 14), engineering (tracks: 6–8, 10–12, 14)
- Omar "B.R The Swamp Rat" Williams – vocals, percussion (track 11), producer (tracks: 2, 14), co-producer (tracks: 3, 8), mixing (tracks: 2–8, 10–12, 14), engineering (tracks: 6–8, 10–12, 14)
- Dedrick "Mack 10" Rolison – vocals (tracks: 2, 4, 7, 11, 13), executive producer
- Toikeon "Ms. Toi" Parham – vocals (track 3)
- Marcus "Squeak Ru" Moore – vocals (tracks: 4, 6)
- Vernell Sales – vocals (track 5)
- O'Shea "Ice Cube" Jackson – vocals (tracks: 7, 11)
- Aaron "MC Eiht" Tyler – vocals (track 7)
- Boo Kapone – vocals (track 7)
- Boobie – vocals (track 7)
- Sharon – vocals (track 10)
- Q.S.-Bandit – vocals (track 11)
- Young Pretty – vocals (track 11)
- Dave! – guitar (track 12)
- Clinton "Mr. Payback" Sands – producer (tracks: 3, 6, 8, 11)
- Gregory H. Royal – producer (tracks: 4, 12), mixing & engineering (tracks: 2–8, 10–12, 14)
- Kier "DJ Kay Gee" Gist – producer & mixing (track 5)
- Darren Lighty – producer (track 5)
- Rick "Dutch" Cousin – producer (track 7)
- Ryan "Binky Mack" Garner – producer (track 10)
- Adam Kudzin – mixing (track 5)
- Ken Johnston – engineering (track 5)
- Eddy Schreyer – mastering
- Jason Clark – artwork

== Charts ==
Chart (1999)	Peak position
US Top R&B/Hip-Hop Albums (Billboard)	91
