= Oh Yeah (Rottin Razkals song) =

Single by Rottin Razkals

from the album Rottin ta da Core
- B-side: "A-Yo"
- Released: January 17, 1995
- Recorded: 1994
- Genre: Hip hop
- Length: 3:23
- Label: Mad Sounds/Motown
- Songwriters: Rottin Razkals, Anthony Criss, Vincent Brown, Keir Lamont Gist
- Producer: Naughty by Nature

Rottin Razkals singles chronology
"Oh Yeah" (1995)	"Hey Alright" (1995)

"Oh Yeah" is the first single released from Rottin Razkals debut album, Rottin ta da Core. It was released on February 17, 1995, and was written and produced by the Razkals' mentors, Naughty by Nature. This single was the most successful of the two singles released from the album, finding its best success on the Hot Rap Singles chart, peaking at No. 14. The song samples "Say Yeah" by the Commodores.

== Track listing ==
=== A-side ===
1. "Oh Yeah" (LP Version)- 3:28
2. "Oh Yeah" (Radio Version)- 3:28
3. "Oh Yeah" (Instrumental)- 3:27
4. "Oh Yeah" (Acapella)- 2:55

=== B-side ===
1. "A-Yo" (LP Version)- 3:21
2. "A-Yo" (Radio Version)- 2:56
3. "A-Yo" (A-Yomental)- 3:20
