= Written on Ya Kitten =

Single by Naughty by Nature

from the album 19 Naughty III
- B-side: "Klickow-Klickow"
- Released: September 28, 1993
- Recorded: 1992
- Genre: Hip hop
- Length: 4:21
- Label: Tommy Boy
- Songwriters: Anthony Criss; Vincent Brown, Kier Gist; Donald Byrd
- Producers: Naughty by Nature; QD III

Naughty by Nature singles chronology
"It's On" (1993)	"Written on Ya Kitten" (1993)	"Groove Thang" (1994)

Music video
- "Written on Ya Kitten" on YouTube

"Written on Ya Kitten" is the third and final single released from American hip hop trio Naughty by Nature's third album, 19 Naughty III (1993). The single was released in September 1993, by Tommy Boy Entertainment, and is produced by Naughty by Nature and QD III. It was the least successful of the three singles released from the album, only making it to 93 and 88 on the US Billboard Hot 100 and Cash Box Top 100. It also peaked at number 53 on the Billboard Hot R&B/Hip-Hop Singles & Tracks. The song was later featured on Nature's Finest: Naughty by Nature's Greatest Hits and Greatest Hits: Naughty's Nicest.

== Critical reception ==
Larry Flick from Billboard magazine wrote that the single "oozes with all the double-entendres that the title suggests." He added, "Luckily, this trio is smart enough to keep things from going beyond cute'n'cheeky wordplay. Sure, it would be nice to see NBN spend its considerable lyrical and melodic talent on more meaty fare, but harmless track does have the charm (not to mention a killer hook) to become a guilty pleasure." Ralph Tee from Music Week's RM Dance Update noted, "Far less frantic than usual, Naughty by Nature return with this suggestive kitty ditty".

== Single track listing ==
A-Side

1. "Written on Ya Kitten" (QDIII Radio Edit)- 3:52
2. "Written on Ya Kitten" (Q-Funk Radio Edit)- 4:18
3. "Written on Ya Kitten" (Instrumental)- 4:18

B-Side

1. "Written on Ya Kitten" (Shandi's Smooth Radio Edit)- 3:26
2. "Klickow-Klickow"- 5:41 (Featuring Rottin Razkals, Road Dawgs & the Cruddy Click)
3. "Klickow-Klickow" (Instrumental)- 5:41

== Charts ==
Chart (1993)	Peak position
New Zealand (Recorded Music NZ)	30
US Billboard Hot 100	93
US Hot R&B/Hip-Hop Singles & Tracks (Billboard)	53
US Maxi-Singles Sales (Billboard)	5
US Cash Box Top 100	88
