= 24-Carat Black =

American soul and funk band

- Origin: Cincinnati, Ohio, United States
- Genres: R&B, funk
- Years active: Early 1970s
- Labels: Stax
- Past members: Larry Austin; Tyrone Steels; Jerome Derrickson; Ricky Foster; James Talbert; William Talbert; Princess Hearn; Kathleen Dent; Valerie Malone; Bruce Thompson; Niambi Steele; Robert Dunson; Hedda Sudduth; Tommy Edwards; Gregory Ingram; Shakir Suleiman; Ernest Lattimore; Rayford Smith; John Walls

24-Carat Black (sometimes styled as The 24-Carat Black) was an American soul and funk band who recorded in the early 1970s. Although they only released one album at the time, the late 1973 concept album Ghetto: Misfortune's Wealth produced and arranged by Dale Warren, their music has been sampled numerous times. A second album compiled of unreleased recordings, Gone: The Promises of Yesterday, was released in 2009.

== History ==
Dale Warren was the nephew of Berry Gordy's second wife, Raynoma, often known as "Miss Ray". He became a conservatory-trained violinist, and in 1961 was recruited by his aunt to work as a strings arranger for Motown Records. After working for smaller labels including Shrine, he was recruited by Stax Records where he arranged and orchestrated Isaac Hayes' albums Hot Buttered Soul, The Isaac Hayes Movement and ...To Be Continued. In 1972, Warren was featured as a composer and conductor at the Wattstax concert.

Around this time, Warren met and took under his wing a young soul group from Cincinnati, Ohio, The Ditalians. He persuaded them to change their name to 24-Carat Black, and wrote and produced their only original recording, the late 1973 concept album Ghetto: Misfortune's Wealth. The band's line-up was Larry Austin (bass); Tyrone Steels (percussion); Jerome Derrickson (saxophone); Ricky Foster (trumpet); James Talbert (electric piano); William Talbert (organ); and Princess Hearn, Kathleen Dent, and Valerie Malone (vocals). The album spotlighted the hardships of life in the inner city, and is divided into eight "synopses" each of which focuses on a different aspect of poverty. It received little attention at the time, but one later reviewer has commented:

"Recorded under Warren's micro-direction with a bunch of teenagers at a time when prog rock bands were the only ones conceiving such a magnum opus, the album struggled to find its place in the market. It was too challenging for an audience looking to escape to the good times of Philadelphia or drink from the joyous wellspring of Motown. Today it stands the test of time as a deep and musically astounding meditation on the black experience in the Seventies."

Warren recorded other tracks with 24-Carat Black in 1974, which were unreleased for many years. By the time of those recordings, group members included vocalists Robert Dunson, Niambi Steele (Still), and Hedda Sudduth, keyboardists Bruce Thompson and Tommy Edwards, saxophonists Henry Williams and Shakir Suleiman, guitarist Rayford Smith, and bassist John Walls, as well as Princess Hearn, Jerome Derrickson, Tyrone Steels, Ricky Foster and Miss Patrice. Singer Princess Hearn married Warren, who stayed with Stax until the company collapsed. Warren died in 1994.

== Legacy ==
Band members William Talbert, Tyrone Steels, Ernest Lattimore and Gregory Ingram later formed another band, Shotgun, who recorded six albums between 1977 and 1982. They also had eight hit records on the Billboard R&B chart, the most successful being "Don't You Wanna Make Love" which reached #35 on the R&B chart in 1979.

Starting in the early 1990s, Ghetto: Misfortune's Wealth became used as a source of breakbeats, by Eric B (on "In The Ghetto" in 1990), Dr. Dre (on "Nas Is Coming"), Jay-Z (on "Can I Live Pt 2"), Digable Planets (on "Cool Like Dat"), Naughty by Nature (for "Poverty's Paradise") and others. More recently, 24-Carat Black songs have been sampled by Pusha-T in "Infrared", Kendrick Lamar in "The Heart Pt. 4" and "FEAR.", Metro Boomin in "No More", and others.

Ghetto: Misfortune’s Wealth was reissued on CD in 1995. Recordings which Warren had made with 24-Carat Black in 1973–1974, largely comprising orchestrated versions of love songs he had reportedly written in the mid-1960s, were stored by keyboardist and engineer Bruce Thompson, and were released on CD in 2009 under the title Gone: The Promises of Yesterday.

== Discography ==
- Ghetto: Misfortune's Wealth (Stax, 1973)
- Gone – The Promises of Yesterday (Numero, 2009 – recorded 1974)
- III (Numero Group, 2020)
