= Jamboree (song) =

Single by Naughty by Nature featuring Zhané

from the album Nineteen Naughty Nine: Nature's Fury
- B-side: "On the Run"
- Released: June 15, 1999
- Genre: Hip hop
- Length: 3:33
- Label: Arista
- Songwriters: Anthony Criss, Vincent Brown, Kier Gist, Benny Golson
- Producer: Naughty by Nature

Naughty by Nature singles chronology
"Live or Die" (1999)	"Jamboree" (1999)	"Holiday" (1999)

Zhané singles chronology
"4 More" (1997)	"Jamboree" (1999)

Music video
- "Jamboree" on YouTube

"Jamboree" is a song by American hip hop group Naughty by Nature for their fifth studio album Nineteen Naughty Nine: Nature's Fury (1999), featuring a chorus with R&B group Zhané. The song was a relative commercial success, peaking at number 10 on the Billboard Hot 100 and number-one on the Hot Rap Singles, becoming their first song since "O.P.P." to reach number-one on the Rap charts. It also spent 5 weeks at number-one on the Canadian RPM Dance Chart. The song was certified gold on August 3, 1999, becoming the group's fourth and final single to reach at least gold status.

In 2020, Katy Perry sampled "Jamboree" on her song " Smile".

== Single track listing ==
=== A-Side ===
1. "Jamboree" (Club Mix)- 3:31
2. "Jamboree" (TV track)- 3:32
3. "Jamboree" (Acappella)- 3:10

=== B-Side ===
1. "Jamboree" (Radio Mix)- 3:32
2. "On the Run" (Album Version)- 3:19
3. "On the Run" (Instrumental)- 3:21

== Charts and certifications ==
=== Weekly charts ===
Chart (1999–2000)	Peak position
Australia (ARIA)	74
Canada Dance (RPM)	1
New Zealand (Recorded Music NZ)	22
UK Singles (Official Charts)	51
US Billboard Hot 100	10
US Hot R&B/Hip-Hop Songs (Billboard)	4
US Hot Rap Songs (Billboard)	1
US Rhythmic Airplay (Billboard)	12

=== Year-end charts ===
Chart (1999)	Position
US Billboard Hot 100	90
US Hot R&B/Hip-Hop Songs (Billboard)	43

=== Certifications ===
Region	Certification	Certified units/sales
United States (RIAA)	Gold	600,000
