= Holiday (Naughty by Nature song) =

1999 song by Naughty by Nature

Single by Naughty by Nature featuring Phiness

from the album Nineteen Naughty Nine: Nature's Fury
- B-side: "On the Run"; "Live or Die"
- Released: October 5, 1999
- Length: 4:08
- Label: Arista
- Songwriters: Kier Gist; Vincent Brown; Anthony Criss; Davide Romani; Tanyayette Willoughby
- Producer: Naughty by Nature

Naughty by Nature singles chronology
"Jamboree" (1999)	"Holiday" (1999)	"Feels Good (Don't Worry Bout a Thing)" (2002)

Music video
- "Holiday" on YouTube

"Holiday" is the fourth and final single released from American hip hop trio Naughty by Nature's fifth album, Nineteen Naughty Nine: Nature's Fury. The song is built around a slowed-down sample of Change's 1980 single "A Lover's Holiday", written by Davide Romani and Tanyayette Willoughby. "Holiday" was released in October 1999 and was the final release that Naughty by Nature released during their short-lived tenure at Arista Records.

"Holiday" narrowly missed the US Billboard Hot R&B/Hip-Hop Singles & Tracks chart, instead making it to number one on the Bubbling Under R&B/Hip-Hop Singles listing. Worldwide, the single reached number six on Canada's RPM Dance chart, number eight in Australia, and number 50 in France.

== Track listings ==
Australian and European CD single

1. "Holiday" (radio mix) – 4:10
2. "Holiday" (Hot 40 remix) – 3:59
3. "Holiday" (radio mix instrumental) – 4:10
4. "On the Run" (radio mix) – 3:21
5. "On the Run" (radio mix instrumental) – 3:21

French CD and 12-inch single

1. "Holiday" – 4:08
2. "Live or Die" (radio mix) – 3:41

== Charts ==
=== Weekly charts ===
Chart (1999–2000)	Peak position
Australia (ARIA)	8
Canada Dance/Urban (RPM)	6
France (SNEP)	50
US Bubbling Under R&B/Hip-Hop Songs (Billboard)	1

=== Year-end charts ===
Chart (2000)	Position
Australia (ARIA)	37

== Certifications ==
Region	Certification	Certified units/sales
Australia (ARIA)	Platinum	70,000^{^}
^{^} Shipments figures based on certification alone.
