= Hey Alright =

Single by Rottin Razkals

from the album Rottin ta da Core
- B-side: "Lik a Shot"
- Released: June 13, 1995
- Recorded: 1994
- Genre: Hip hop
- Length: 4:18
- Label: Mad Sounds/Motown
- Songwriter(s): Rottin Razkals, Naughty by Nature
- Producer(s): Naughty by Nature

Rottin Razkals singles chronology
"Oh Yeah" (1995)	"Hey Alright" (1995)

"Hey Alright" is the second and final single released from the Rottin Razkals' debut album, Rottin ta da Core. It was released on June 13, 1995, and was produced and written by Naughty by Nature. The single reached number 23 on the Billboard Hot Rap Singles chart. The song sampled "Caravan of Love" by Isley Jasper Isley.

== Track listing ==
=== A-side ===
1. "Hey Alright" (Radio Edit)- 3:44
2. "Hey Alright" (LP Version)- 3:48
3. "Hey Alright" (Instrumental)- 3:45
4. "Hey Alright" (Acapella)- 3:15

=== B-side ===
1. "Lik a Shot" (Radio Edit)- 3:55
2. "Lik a Shot" (LP Version)- 4:11
3. "Lik a Shot" (Instrumental)- 3:52
4. "Lik a Shot" (Acapella)- 3:51
