= Dale Warren =

American musician

- Born: Dale Ossman Warren; September 27, 1943; Detroit, Michigan, US
- Died: February 3, 1994 (aged 50) Gwinnett County, Georgia, US
- Genres: R&B, soul, classical
- Occupations: Arranger, songwriter, record producer
- Instrument: Violin
- Years active: 1961–1990s
- Labels: Motown; Shrine; Stax

Dale Ossman Warren (September 27, 1943 – February 3, 1994) was an American musician, who was best known for his work as an arranger for Motown Records in the early 1960s, and later for the Stax label where he worked with Isaac Hayes among many others. He was also primarily responsible for writing, arranging and producing the influential 1973 funk concept album Ghetto: Misfortune's Wealth by 24-Carat Black.

== Life and career ==
He was born in Detroit, Michigan, United States, and was the nephew of Berry Gordy's second wife, Raynoma, often known as "Miss Ray". He was an accomplished conservatory-trained violinist, and in 1961 was recruited by his aunt to work as a strings arranger for Motown Records. There, he worked with The Supremes, among others, and also worked in the early 1960s as a freelance arranger with other Detroit record labels. He arranged Bettye LaVette's "Let Me Down Easy", released on the Calla label in 1965, and wrote and arranged tracks by Ronnie and Robyn on the Sidra label. Also in 1965, he began working in Washington, D.C. as an arranger for Shrine Records, a company established by Raynoma Gordy and her then husband, songwriter Eddie Singleton.

After the Shrine label folded in the late 1960s, Warren worked as an arranger at Stax Records, composing scores for such musicians as Billy Eckstine, Eddie Floyd, Isaac Hayes, The Bar-Kays, Albert King and The Staple Singers. He orchestrated Isaac Hayes' version of "Walk On By" on his classic 1969 album Hot Buttered Soul, and was also responsible for the arrangements on Hayes' follow-up albums, The Isaac Hayes Movement and ...To Be Continued the following year. In 1972, Warren was featured as a composer and conductor at the Wattstax concert, leading the "Wattstax '72 Orchestra" and writing the extended instrumental piece that opened the event, "Salvation Symphony".

Around this time, Warren met and took under his wing a young soul group from Cincinnati, Ohio, The Ditalians. He persuaded them to change their name to 24-Carat Black, and wrote and produced their only original recording, the late 1973 concept album Ghetto: Misfortune's Wealth. The album spotlighted the hardships of life in the inner city, and is divided into eight "synopses" each of which focuses on a different aspect of poverty. Although Warren recorded many other tracks with 24-Carat Black, they went unreleased until 2009. The group's lead singer Princess Hearn married Warren. While preparing for his only film score in 1974,The Klansman, a movie starring Richard Burton, Lee Marvin and O. J. Simpson, Stax Records shuttered and collapsed. 24-Carat Black was stranded waiting for promotion money from Stax. Dale kept the group afloat with his own finances, returning to the group after doing the movie score.

Reportedly, Warren suffered from various personal problems, including alcoholism, that made him unreliable. He later worked as a classical musician and instrumentalist in Los Angeles, before moving to Atlanta, Georgia. In the early 1990s, he worked with a band called Rain On Monday, whose recordings went unreleased. He suffered from financial as well as health problems. He died in 1994, in Gwinnett County, Georgia.

== Legacy ==
Starting in the early 1990s, Warren's recordings – particularly Ghetto: Misfortune's Wealth – became used as a source of breakbeats, by Eric B (on "In The Ghetto" in 1990), Dr. Dre (on "Nas Is Coming"), Jay-Z (on "Can I Live Pt 2"), Digable Planets (on "Cool Like Dat"), Naughty by Nature (for "Poverty's Paradise"), and others.

Ghetto: Misfortune’s Wealth was reissued on CD in 1995. Recordings which Warren had made with 24-Carat Black in 1973–1974, largely comprising orchestrated versions of love songs he had reportedly written in the mid-1960s, were stored by keyboardist, engineer, and protégé to Dale Warren, Bruce Thompson and were released on Vinyl and CD in 2009 under the title Gone: The Promises of Yesterday.
