= Everything's Gonna Be Alright (Naughty by Nature song) =

1991 single by Naughty by Nature

Single by Naughty by Nature

from the album Naughty by Nature
- B-side: "O.P.P." (Live)
- Released: November 26, 1991
- Studio: Unique (New York)
- Genre: Hip-hop
- Length: 3:16
- Label: Tommy Boy
- Songwriters: Vincent Brown; Anthony Criss; Vincent Ford
- Producer: Naughty by Nature

Naughty by Nature singles chronology
| "O.P.P." (1991) | "Everything's Gonna Be Alright" (1991) | "Uptown Anthem" (1992) |

Music video
- "Everything's Gonna Be Alright" on YouTube

"Everything's Gonna Be Alright" is the second single released in November 1991 from American hip hop group Naughty by Nature's self-titled second album (1991). The song is titled "Ghetto Bastard" on uncensored versions of the eponymous album.

While not as successful as their previous single, "O.P.P.", "Everything's Gonna Be Alright" managed to make it to No. 53 on the Billboard Hot 100 and No. 9 on the Hot Rap Singles. The song would later appear on both of the group's compilation albums, 1999's Nature's Finest: Naughty by Nature's Greatest Hits and 2003's Greatest Hits: Naughty's Nicest. It was rerecorded for the 2011 release, Anthem Inc.

The song's chorus is derived from Bob Marley's "No Woman, No Cry".

== Critical reception ==
Larry Flick from Billboard magazine wrote, "Follow-up to platinum single 'O.P.P.' is not as light and fluffy, though it will establish rap act as lyricists to be reckoned with. Story lines about surviving fatherless homes seem to be all the rage at the moment. Here, topic is handled with an intelligent and optimistic hand." New Musical Express said, "Here they hook up to the jamdown sound of Bob Marley and the Wailers' classic of yore and impregnate it with their own special blend of ghetto wisdom. A subtle and welcome switch from the usual Uzi-toting brag that many rappers prefer to spout and a clear indication that rap has still got a lot to say." A reviewer from Music & Media noted that here, the "talented rap crew" had replaced the reggae beat of the Marley song with a modern dance groove, complimenting it as "easy programmable."

== Retrospective response ==
Jesse Ducker from Albumism said in his 2021 retrospective review of the Naughty by Nature album, that "Everything's Gonna Be Alright" is "the stronger and more incisive recording [than its predecessor]." He described it as "unremittingly bleak", adding, "I can think of few songs that are better at presenting a first-person account of despair and poverty." Jean Rosenbluth from Los Angeles Times wrote that in the "bittersweet" song, the group delivered "an astonishingly powerful song (melody and all)" that is second in life-in-the-ghetto resonance only to Geto Boys' "Mind Playing Tricks on Me".

== Music video ==
A music video was produced to promote the single, featuring the band rapping as they walk on sidewalks throughout the inner city of their hometown of East Orange, New Jersey and in the nearby Christopher Columbus Homes Housing Project in Newark. While hanging out they chase away a drug dealer and scare him with a machete. The video was later published on Tommy Boy Records' official YouTube channel in June 2018. It has amassed more than 6.5 million views as of February 2026.

== Single track listing ==
=== A-Side ===
1. "Everything's Gonna Be Alright" (LP Version)- 4:51
2. "Everything's Gonna Be Alright" (Radio Mix)- 4:14

=== B-Side ===
1. "O.P.P." (Live)- 6:15
2. "Everything's Gonna Be Alright" (Everything's OK)- 4:50
3. "Everything's Gonna Be Alright" (Everything's OK Instrumental)- 4:14

== Charts ==
| Chart (1992) | Peak position |
|---|---|
| Australia (ARIA) | 76 |
| Canada Singles (The Record) | 10 |
| Europe (European Dance Radio) | 11 |
| New Zealand (Recorded Music NZ) | 13 |
| UK Singles (OCC) | 76 |
| UK Dance (Music Week) | 29 |
| UK Club Chart (Music Week) | 33 |
| US Billboard Hot 100 | 53 |
| US Hot R&B Singles (Billboard) | 12 |
| US Hot Rap Singles (Billboard) | 9 |
| US Hot Dance Music/Maxi-Singles Sales (Billboard) | 8 |
