= Rottin ta da Core =

Studio album by Rottin Razkals
- Released: March 14, 1995
- Recorded: 1994
- Studio: Marion Recording Studios (New Jersey); Platinum Island Studios (New York)
- Genre: Hip-hop
- Length: 43:16
- Label: Mad Sounds; Illtown
- Producer: Double I; Mufi; Naughty by Nature

Singles from Rottin ta da Core
- 1. "Oh Yeah" Released: January 17, 1995; 2. "Hey Alright" Released: June 13, 1995

Professional ratings
Review scores
Source	Rating
AllMusic	1.5/5 stars
RapReviews	5.5/10

Rottin ta da Core is the only studio album by American hip-hop group Rottin Razkals. It was released on March 14, 1995 through Illtown/Mad Sounds Recordings. Recording sessions took place at Marion Recording Studios in New Jersey and at Platinum Island Studios in New York. Production was handled by Naughty by Nature, Double I, and Mufi. It features guest appearances from Treach, Road Dawgs, Bad News, Black, Cruddy Click, Dueja, Headache, Steel Handler and Supreme C.

The album managed to make it to number 190 on the Billboard 200, number 28 on the Top R&B/Hip-Hop Albums and number 14 on the Top Heatseekers. It was supported by two charting singles: "Hey Alright", which peaked at number 74 on the Hot R&B/Hip-Hop Songs and number 23 on the Hot Rap Songs, and "Oh Yeah", which peaked at number 63 on the Hot R&B/Hip-Hop Songs and number 14 on the Hot Rap Songs charts in the United States.

== Track listing ==
No.	Title	Lyrics	Music	Producer(s)	Length
1.	"Intro"	Abdullah Barr; Jeffrey Ray; Charles Kelley	Naughty by Nature		1:36
2.	"Batter Up"	Barr; Kelley; Ray; Anthony Criss; Keir Gist; Vincent Brown; Omar Williams	Naughty by Nature		5:03
3.	"Oh Yeah"	Barr; Ray; Kelley	Naughty by Nature; Ronald LaPread; Lionel Richie		3:23
4.	"Frustration"	Barr; Ray; Kelley; E. Gist; M. Moore; Williams; Naughty by Nature	Naughty by Nature	Naughty by Nature; Double I	4:00
5.	"A-Yo"	Barr; Ray; Kelley	Naughty by Nature; Jack McDuff; John D. Loudermilk		3:31
6.	"Hey Alright"	Barr; Ray; Kelley; Naughty by Nature	Naughty by Nature		4:18
7.	"Lik' a Shot"	Barr; Ray; Kelley; Carl Harte; E. Gist; Headache; Dueja; M. Moore; O. Williams; Naughty by Nature	Naughty by Nature		4:07
8.	"One Time for Ya Mind"	Barr; Ray; Kelley; Criss; K. Gist; Brown	Naughty by Nature	Naughty by Nature; Mufi	4:00
9.	"Get Up, Stand Up"	Barr; Ray; Kelley; Criss; K. Gist; Brown	Naughty by Nature		3:08
10.	"Life of Bastard" (featuring Treach)	Barr; Kelley; Ray; Naughty by Nature	Naughty by Nature		2:51
11.	"Homiez Niggas"	Barr; Ray; Kelley; Naughty by Nature	Naughty by Nature		3:46
12.	"Come on Y'all"	Criss; Ray; Kelley	Naughty by Nature; George Clinton; William Collins; Bernie Worrell	Double I	3:33
Total length:					43:16

Sample credits

- Track 3 contains a sample from "Say Yeah" written by Ronald LaPread and Lionel Richie and performed by the Commodores.
- Track 5 contains a sample from "Tobacco Road" written by John D. Loudermilk and performed by Brother Jack McDuff.
- Track 6 contains a sample from "Caravan of Love" written by Ernie Isley, Marvin Isley and Chris Jasper and performed by Isley-Jasper-Isley.
- Track 10 contains a replayed sample from "Could I Be Falling in Love" written by Alex Zanties.
- Track 12 contains a sample from "How Do You View You" written by George Clinton, William Collins and Bernie Worrell and performed by the Funkadelics.

== Personnel ==
- Abdullah Barr – vocals
- Charles Kelley – vocals
- Jeffrey Ray – vocals
- Anthony "Treach" Criss – additional vocals (track 2), vocals (track 10)
- Headache – additional vocals (tracks: 2, 7)
- Bad News – additional vocals (track 2)
- Jonte "G-Luv" Ray – additional vocals (tracks: 2, 4, 7)
- Omar "B.R The Swamp Rat" Williams – additional vocals (tracks: 2, 4, 7)
- Steel Handler – additional vocals (track 2)
- Cruddy Click – additional vocals (tracks: 4, 7)
- Black – additional vocals (track 7)
- Dueja – additional vocals (track 7)
- Supreme C – additional vocals (track 7)
- David Bellochio – keyboards (tracks: 2-4, 6, 7, 10-12), recording
- Jack Daley – bass (tracks: 2-4, 7, 10)
- Angela Piva – recording, mixing
- Bob Power – mixing
- Kier "KayGee" Gist – mixing, executive producer
- Ken "Duro" Ifill – recording assistant
- Mike Pisano – recording assistant
- Steve Sisco – recording assistant
- Eddy Schreyer – mastering
- Sonny Mediana – art direction
- Kwesi Osborne – design
- James Minchin – photography
- Lisa Smith Craig – production coordinator

== Charts ==
Chart (1995)	Peak position
US Billboard 200	190
US Top R&B/Hip-Hop Albums (Billboard)	28
