= It's On =

Single by Naughty by Nature

from the album 19 Naughty III
- B-side: "It's On" (Beatnuts Remix)
- Released: June 8, 1993
- Recorded: 1992
- Genre: Hip hop; jazz rap
- Length: 5:03
- Label: Tommy Boy
- Songwriters: Anthony Criss; Vincent Brown; Kier Gist; Donald Byrd
- Producer: Naughty by Nature

Naughty by Nature singles chronology
"Hip Hop Hooray" (1993)	"It's On" (1993)	"Written on Ya Kitten" (1993)

Music video
- "It's On" on YouTube

"It's On" is a song by American hip hop trio Naughty by Nature, released on June 8, 1993, by Tommy Boy Records, as the second single from the trio's third album, 19 Naughty III (1993). The song was produced and written by the three members of the group, and found decent success on the US Billboard charts, making it to number 74 on the Billboard Hot 100 and number 48 on the Billboard Hot R&B/Hip-Hop Songs chart. It samples jazz artist Donald Byrd's "French Spice", for which he received writing credits. The official remix was produced by the production duo The Beatnuts and featured on the B-side of the single.

== Critical reception ==
Upon the single release, Larry Flick from Billboard magazine described it as "another wildly infectious, fist-waving anthem that combines rapid-fire rhymes and live, butt-shaking beats." He added, "Chanted chorus could open deserved doors at top 40 formats, though track is hard enough to keep that all-important street cred in check." Andrew Smith from Melody Maker wrote, "Naughty by Nature specialize in cultivating a groove, and there are a few funky ones on show here, though I could do without the gun on the cover." Andy Beevers from Music Week felt "this hard-hitting rap track will appeal to established fans but appears to lack the crossover appeal of 'OPP' or 'Hip Hip Hooray'." Dele Fadele from NME opined that it "lacks bite, seeming inconsequential in the face of the floor-filling, arms-waving 'Hip Hop Hooray'." Touré from Rolling Stone named it a "strong" single. In a retrospective review, Jesse Ducker from Albumism stated that the song "is a musical change of pace, as Treach and Vinnie rhyme over a horn-heavy loop from Donald Byrd's 'French Spice'."

== Single track listing ==
- A-Side
1. "It's On" (Kay Gee Remix) - 3:06
2. "It's On" (Instrumental) - 3:06
- B-Side
1. "It's On" (Beatnuts Remix) - 3:31
2. "Hip Hop Hooray" (Pete Rock Remix) - 4:32
3. "It's On" (A Capella) - 3:11

== Charts ==
Chart (1993)	Peak position
Australia (ARIA)	51
Canada (The Record)	15
New Zealand (Recorded Music NZ)	34
UK Singles (Official Charts)	48
UK Dance (Music Week)	12
US Billboard Hot 100	74
US Hot R&B/Hip-Hop Songs (Billboard)	48
US Maxi-Singles Sales (Billboard)	5
US Cash Box Top 100	58
