= Craziest =

Single by Naughty by Nature

from the album Poverty's Paradise
- B-side: "Holdin' Fort"
- Released: April 4, 1995
- Recorded: 1994
- Genre: Hip hop
- Length: 4:12
- Label: Tommy Boy
- Songwriter(s): Ronald Isley, Ernie Isley, Rudolph Isley, Chris Jasper, O'Kelly Isley Jr., Marvin Isley, Vincent Brown, Anthony Criss, Keir Gist,
- Producer(s): Naughty by Nature

Naughty by Nature singles chronology
"Clap Yo Hands" (1995)	"Craziest" (1995)	"Feel Me Flow" (1995)

Music video
- "Craziest" on YouTube

"Craziest" is the second single released from Naughty by Nature's fourth album, Poverty's Paradise. The song was a mild success on the Billboard Hot 100 and Hot R&B/Hip-Hop Singles & Tracks, peaking at 51 and 27 on the charts respectively, but it became Naughty by Nature's fourth top 10 single on the Hot Rap Singles, peaking at 5 on that chart. The video was directed by Hype Williams.

== Single track listing ==
=== A-Side ===
1. "Craziest" (Original)- 4:10
2. "Craziest" (Syrup And Water Vocal Mix) remix by Crazy C- 4:17
3. "Craziest" (Instrumental)- 3:49

=== B-Side ===
1. "Holdin' Fort" (Original Mix)- 3:35
2. "Holdin' Fort" (LG & LoRider Remix)- 4:13
3. "Craziest" (A Capella)- 3:03

== Charts ==
=== Weekly charts ===
Chart (1995)	Peak position
Australia (ARIA)	54
Canada Singles (The Record)	15
New Zealand (Recorded Music NZ)	6
US Billboard Hot 100	51
US Dance Singles Sales (Billboard)	1
US Hot R&B/Hip-Hop Songs (Billboard)	27
US Hot Rap Songs (Billboard)	5

=== Year-end charts ===
Chart (1995)	Position
New Zealand (Recorded Music NZ)	47
