= Clap Yo Hands =

Single by Naughty by Nature

from the album Poverty's Paradise
- B-side: "The Chain Remains"
- Released: February 17, 1995
- Recorded: 1994
- Genre: Hip hop, pop
- Length: 4:39
- Label: Tommy Boy
- Songwriter(s): Vincent Brown, Al Cooper, Anthony Criss, Keir Gist, Harry S. Pepper, John E. Watt
- Producer(s): Naughty by Nature

Naughty by Nature singles chronology
"Groove Thang" (1994)	"Clap Yo Hands" (1995)	"Craziest" (1995)

Music video
- "Clap Yo Hands" on YouTube

"Clap Yo Hands" is the first single released from Naughty by Nature's fourth album, Poverty's Paradise. It was released in 1995 and was written and produced by the group. "Clap Yo Hands" was not as successful as the album's next two singles, but it did make it to 5 on the Bubbling Under Hot 100 Singles (105 on the US Charts) and 33 on the Hot Rap Singles.

== Music video ==
The music video to "Clap Yo Hands" was released in March 1995. KRS-One and Fat Joe made cameo appearances.

== Track listing ==
=== A-side ===
1. "Clap Yo Hands" (Video Edit) – 4:11
2. "Clap Yo Hands" (Kay Gee Funky Mix) – 4:10
3. "Clap Yo Hands" (A Cappella) – 3:42

=== B-side ===
1. "The Chain Remains" (Clean Album Version) – 4:33
2. "The Chain Remains" (Album Version) – 4:36
3. "Clap Yo Hands" (Instrumental) – 4:10
4. "Clap Yo Hands" (Kay Gee Funky Mix Instrumental) – 4:11

== Charts ==
Chart (1995)	Peak position
Australia (ARIA)	98
New Zealand (Recorded Music NZ)	17
US Bubbling Under Hot 100 Singles (Billboard)	5
US Hot Dance Music/Maxi-Singles Sales (Billboard)	31
US Hot R&B/Hip-Hop Songs (Billboard)	70
US Hot Rap Songs (Billboard)	33
