= Naughty by Nature: Tha Mixtape =

Tha Mixtape

Mixtape by Naughty by Nature feat. Garden State Greats
- Released: 21 September 2010
- Recorded: 2010
- Genre: East Coast hip hop
- Length: 27:12
- Label: Illtown Records

Tha Mixtape is the first mixtape by Naughty by Nature featuring Garden State Greats. The mixtape featured the single "Gotta Lotta" and is meant as a preview to their upcoming studio album Anthem Inc..

== Track listing ==
1. "Church" – 0:53
2. "Respect" – 4:13
3. "Hood Shit" – 3:41
4. "Gotta Lotta" – 3:33
5. "Kill Tha Beat" – 3:52
6. "Heavy In My Chevy" – 4:33
7. "After My Chedda" – 2:50
8. "Tha Corner" – 2:30
9. "So Many Things" – 4:25
