= Poverty's Paradise =

Studio album by Naughty by Nature
- Released: May 30, 1995
- Recorded: 1994–95
- Studios: Battery Studios (New York City); Marion Recording Studios (Studio City, Los Angeles); Soundtrack Studios (New York City)
- Genre: East Coast hip hop
- Length: 62:41
- Labels: Tommy Boy; Warner Bros.
- Producers: Naughty by Nature; Minnesota; Brice; Kid Nyce

Naughty by Nature chronology
19 Naughty III (1993)	Poverty's Paradise (1995)	Nineteen Naughty Nine: Nature's Fury (1999)

Singles from Poverty's Paradise
- 1. "Clap Yo Hands" Released: February 17, 1995; 2. "Craziest" Released: April 4, 1995; 3. "Feel Me Flow" Released: July 23, 1995

Poverty's Paradise is the fourth album from Naughty by Nature, released on May 30, 1995, as their final album under Tommy Boy Records. It peaked at number three on the Billboard 200 and number one on the Top R&B/Hip-Hop Albums chart. A single released from the album, "Feel Me Flow", achieved major success, peaking at number 17 on the Billboard Hot 100, two other singles "Craziest" and "Clap Yo Hands", achieved minor success, the former peaking at number 51 on the Hot 100.

At the 38th Annual Grammy Awards, Poverty's Paradise won the award for Best Rap Album, which was a new category that year.

== Critical reception ==
Professional ratings
Initial reviews (in 1995)
Review scores
Source	Rating
Chicago Tribune	3/4 stars
Robert Christgau	A−
Entertainment Weekly	A
NME	7/10
Q	3/5 stars
Rolling Stone	3/5 stars
Select	3/5 medals
Smash Hits	4/5 stars
The Source	4/5 stars
Vibe	(positive)

Professional ratings
Retrospective reviews (after 1995)
Review scores
Source	Rating
AllMusic	3.5/5 stars
Sputnikmusic	3.5/5

James Bernard of Entertainment Weekly praised both Treach and Vinnie for their commanding presence throughout the track listing and felt the record was prime for summer replays, saying "Dominated by rollicking bass lines, chant-along choruses, and the catchy, tight rhyme schemes that are Naughty's trademark, Poverty is tailor-made for low driving on the beach." AllMusic's Stephen Thomas Erlewine said that "[F]or their third album, Naughty By Nature do little to truly change their style. Some of the beats are little slower and funkier, some of the rhymes are more dexterous, some of the rhythms are a little more complex -- yet nothing distinguishes Poverty's Paradise from the group's two previous, and superior, records." Martin Johnson of the Chicago Tribune said about the album: "Yes, there are many radio-friendly anthemic numbers that could make a nifty summer soundtrack, but the real strength of this record is its consistency; there are no weak spots. Most tracks roll by with New Jersey-styled funk and rollicking rhymes from Treach and Kay Gee, whose lyrics depict the 'hood without romanticizing it." Cheo H. Coker, writing for Rolling Stone, gave note of the record following the same formula as the group's previous efforts: "a few party-starting tracks ("Clap Yo Hands," "Craziest"), some social commentary ("Chain Remains," "Holding Fort") and a barrage of lyrical fury ("Klickcow, Klicow," "Respect Due")", but said that it retains their "sheer funkability" thanks to the "production stylistics" of Kay Gee's work, Vinnie's "improved rhyme skills," and Treach remaining consistent in his vocal conviction, saying "there's emotional substance behind the flashy verbal pyrotechnics."

== Track listing ==
No.	Title	Writer(s)	Producer(s)	Length
1.	"Intro" (Skit)			0:38
2.	"Poverty's Paradise"	Keir Gist; Anthony Criss; Vincent Brown	Naughty by Nature	1:01
3.	"Clap Yo Hands"	Gist; Criss; Brown	Naughty by Nature	4:39
4.	"City of Ci-Lo"	Gist; Criss; Brown	Minnesota	3:13
5.	"Hang Out and Hustle" (featuring G-Luv of Road Dawgs and I Face Finsta of Cruddy Click)	Gist; Criss; Brown	Naughty by Nature	3:15
6.	"It's Workin'" (featuring Rottin Razkals)	Gist; Criss; Brown	Naughty by Nature	4:06
7.	"Holdin' Fort"	Gist; Criss; Brown	Naughty by Nature; Al Mal	3:34
8.	"Chain Remains"	Gist; Criss; Brown	Brice	4:33
9.	"Feel Me Flow"	Gist; Criss; Brown; Arthur Neville; Joseph Modeliste; Leo Nocentelli; George Porter Jr.	Naughty by Nature	3:33
10.	"Craziest"	Gist; Criss; Brown	Naughty by Nature	4:12
11.	"Radio" (Skit)			0:09
12.	"Sunshine"	Gist; Criss; Brown	Naughty by Nature	3:13
13.	"Webber (Skit)" (featuring Chris Webber)			0:49
14.	"Respect Due"	Gist; Criss; Brown	Naughty by Nature	3:03
15.	"World Go Round"	Gist; Criss; Brown; Tony Williams	Minnesota	3:06
16.	"Klickow-Klickow" (featuring Rottin Razkals, Cruddy Click and Road Dawgs)	Brown; Gist; Criss	Naughty by Nature	5:00
17.	"Double I" (Skit)			0:13
18.	"Slang Bang"	Gist; Criss; Brown	Kid Nyce	3:42
19.	"Shout Out" (featuring Gordon Chambers)	Gist; Criss; Brown; Gordon Chambers; Leroy Bonner; Gregory Webster; Andrew Noland; Marshall Jones; Ralph Middlebrooks; Marvin Pierce; Norman Napier	Naughty by Nature	7:02
20.	"Outro"			0:27
21.	"Connections" (featuring Kandi Kain, Road Dawgs and Cruddy Click (from the New Jersey Drive, Vol. 2 soundtrack)	Gist; Criss; Brown	Naughty by Nature	3:10

Sample credits

- "Poverty's Paradise" contains a sample from "Poverty's Paradise", written by Dale Warren and performed by 24-Carat Black.
- "Clap Yo Hands" contains a sample from:
  - "Eric B. Is President", written and performed by Eric B. & Rakim.
  - "I Thank You", written by David Porter and Isaac Hayes, and performed by Sam & Dave.
- "City of Ci-Lo" contains a sample from "The Bones Fly from Spoons Hand", performed by The Last Poets.
- "Hang Out and Hustle" contains a sample from:
  - "Just Hanging Out"; written by Kevin McKenzie, Shawn McKenzie, and William Mitchell; and performed by Main Source.
  - "Hang Out and Hustle", written by James Brown and Charles Sherrell, and performed by The J.B.'s.
- "Feel Me Flow" contains a sample from "Find Yourself", performed by The Meters.
- "Craziest" contains a sample from "That's All That Matters Baby", written and performed by Charles Wright.
- "Sunshine" contains a sample from "Everybody Loves the Sunshine", written and performed by Roy Ayers.
- "Respect Due" contains a sample from:
  - "King of Rock"; written by Larry Smith, Joseph Simmons, and Darryl McDaniels; and performed by Run-DMC.
  - "Off and On"; written by Marvin Gaye, James Nyx Jr., Freddie Perren, Fonce Mizell, Berry Gordy, Edward Fordham, Marcus Jones, Antonio Perry, and Deke Richards; and performed by Trends of Culture.
- "World Go Round" contains a sample from:
  - "People Make the World Go Round", written by Thom Bell and Linda Creed, and performed by Michael Jackson.
  - What You Do to Me", written and performed by Tony Williams.
- "Shout Out" contains a sample from "Our Love Has Died", performed by Ohio Players.
- "Outro" contains a sample from the motion picture Animal House.
- "Connections" contains a sample from "The What"; written by Osten Harvey, Christopher Wallace, Sean Combs, and Method Man; and performed by The Notorious B.I.G.

== Samples ==
- "Intro Skit"
  - "Soul Sister Brown Sugar" by Sam & Dave
- "Poverty's Paradise"
  - "Poverty's Paradise" by 24 Carat Black
- "Clap Yo Hands"
  - "I Thank You" by Sam & Dave
  - "Eric B. is President" by Eric B. & Rakim
  - "Devotion (Live)" by Earth, Wind & Fire
- "City of Ci-Lo"
  - "Bones Fly from Spoon's Hand" by Lightnin' Rod
  - "Stranded on Death Row" by Dr. Dre
- "Hang Out and Hustle"
  - "Hang out and Hustle" by Sweet Charles
- "Feel Me Flow"
  - "Find Yourself" by The Meters
- "Craziest"
  - "That's All That Matters Baby" by Charles Wright & the Watts 103rd Street Rhythm Band
- "Sunshine"
  - "Everybody Loves the Sunshine" by Roy Ayers
- "World Go Round"
  - "People Make the World Go Round" by Michael Jackson
  - "What You Do to Me" by Tony Williams
- "Klickow-Klickow"
  - "Funky Worm" by Ohio Players
- "Slang Bang"
  - "Inside My Love" by Minnie Riperton
- "Shout Out"
  - "Our Love Has Died" by Ohio Players
- "Connections"
  - "Hard Times" by Baby Huey & "The What" by The Notorious B.I.G. feat. Method Man

== Album chart positions ==
=== Weekly charts ===
Chart (1995)	Peak position
Australian Albums (ARIA)	37
German Albums (Offizielle Top 100)	39
New Zealand Albums (RMNZ)	26
Swiss Albums (Schweizer Hitparade)	44
UK Albums (Official Charts)	20
UK R&B Albums (Official Charts)	2
US Billboard 200	3
US Top R&B/Hip-Hop Albums (Billboard)	1

=== Year-end charts ===
Chart (1995)	Position
US Billboard 200	121
US Top R&B/Hip-Hop Albums (Billboard)	47

== Singles chart positions ==
Year	Song	Chart positions		
Year	Song	Billboard Hot 100	Hot R&B/Hip-Hop Singles & Tracks	Hot Rap Singles
1995	"Craziest"	51	27	5
1995	"Feel Me Flow"	17	17	3
1995	"Clap Yo Hands"	105	70	33

== Certifications ==
Region	Certification	Certified units/sales
United States (RIAA)	Gold	500,000^{^}
^{^} Shipments figures based on certification alone.

== See also ==
- List of number-one R&B albums of 1995 (U.S.)
