= Feel Me Flow =

Single by Naughty by Nature

from the album Poverty's Paradise
- B-side: "Hang Out and Hustle"
- Released: May 23, 1995
- Genre: Hip hop
- Length: 3:34
- Label: Tommy Boy
- Songwriters: Anthony Criss; Vincent Brown; Kier Gist; Ziggy Modeliste; Art Neville; Cyril Neville; Leo Nocentelli; George Porter Jr.
- Producer: Naughty by Nature

Naughty by Nature singles chronology
"Craziest" (1995)	"Feel Me Flow" (1995)	"Mourn You Til I Join You" (1997)

Music video
- "Feel Me Flow" on YouTube

"Feel Me Flow" is a song by American hip hop group Naughty by Nature, released in May 1995 by Tommy Boy Records as a single from their fourth album, Poverty's Paradise (1995). The song was the most successful single from the album, peaking at number three on the US Billboard Hot Rap Singles chart in mid-June and at number 17 on the Billboard Hot 100 in mid-July. The sole rapper on the song is Treach. The accompanying music video shows him near a pool and the ocean in the midst of a heat wave, and also shows clips of the winter and people snowboarding. The winter scene was recorded at Stratton Mountain Resort in Vermont. The song was later featured in the 2002 film 8 Mile.

== Critical reception ==
Pan-European magazine Music & Media wrote, "Well done naughties! You don't have to check the sample credits. As so much pure swing, the track automatically points to New Orleans soul and its house band the Meters ('Find Yourself')." Ted Kessler from NME commented, "Treach and co return with a song as hardy and sure-footed as 'Hip Hop Hooray', another call-and-response hip-hop anthem that should ensure Naughty by Nature are not handed the key to that most overcrowded of pop's resting places: the home of the one-hit hip-hop wonder. They're not saying much here, other than they're still here and still fab, but they do it with an elegant East Coast swagger that's intended on the memory as soon as the first chorus has faded out. A hit, Cap'n!"

Another NME editor, Iestyn George, complimented the song as "a fresh call and response excursion from the Paul Heaton-endorsed East Coast rap crew, featuring the Radio Edit's neat jazzy keyboard loop and a funky bass-line for that smooth summer hit quotient, plus a brace of monstrous subterranean versions for blasting out loud whilst cruising around the 'hood in yo' mutha's Vauxhall Nova."

== Track listing ==
- CD single
1. "Feel Me Flow" (Original Mix)
2. "Hang Out and Hustle" (Original Mix)
3. "Feel Me Flow" (E-A-Ski Remix)
4. "Feel Me Flow" (Original Instrumental)
5. "Hang Out and Hustle" (Original Instrumental)

== Charts ==
=== Usage in Media ===
In 2025, the song was used in a Starbucks commercial for the drink called the Iced Lavender Matcha, where a barista is shown dancing around to the tune.

=== Weekly charts ===
Chart (1995)	Peak position
Australia (ARIA)	89
New Zealand (Recorded Music NZ)	11
UK Singles (OCC)	23
UK Club Chart (Music Week)	60
US Billboard Hot 100	17
US Hot R&B/Hip-Hop Songs (Billboard)	17
US Hot Rap Songs (Billboard)	3
US Rhythmic Airplay (Billboard)	12

=== Year-end charts ===
Chart (1995)	Position
US Billboard Hot 100	73
US Hot R&B/Hip-Hop Songs (Billboard)	68

== Certifications ==
Region	Certification	Certified units/sales
United States (RIAA)	Gold	500,000^{^}
^{^} Shipments figures based on certification alone.
