= IIcons =

Studio album by Naughty by Nature
- Released: May 7, 2002
- Recorded: 2001–02
- Genre: East Coast hip hop
- Length: 1:03:48
- Label: TVT
- Producers: Da Beatminerz; DJ Twinz; Lil' Jon; Jay "Griff"; Keith "Wok" Watts; Naughty by Nature

Naughty by Nature chronology
Nineteen Naughty Nine: Nature's Fury (1999)	IIcons (2002)	Anthem Inc. (2011)

Singles from IIcons
- 1. "Feels Good (Don't Worry Bout a Thing)" Released: April 30, 2002

Professional ratings
Review scores
Source	Rating
AllMusic	4/5 stars
Blender	2/5 stars
HipHopDX	3.5/5 stars
Robert Christgau	(choice cut)
Rolling Stone	3/5 stars
Sputnikmusic	2.5/5
Vibe	2.5/5 stars

IIcons is the sixth studio album by American hip hop group Naughty by Nature. It was released on May 7, 2002, on TVT Records. Production was handled by Naughty by Nature, Da Beatminerz, DJ Twinz and Lil' Jon. It features guest appearances from Rottin Razkals, 3LW, Carl Thomas, Chyna Whyte, Freddie Foxxx, Icarus, Lil' Jon, Method Man, Pink, Queen Latifah, Redman and Road Dawgs. The album was a success, peaking at No. 15 on the Billboard 200 and No. 5 on the Top R&B/Hip-Hop Albums, and spawned the single, "Feels Good (Don't Worry Bout a Thing)" which made it to No. 53 on the Billboard Hot 100.

IIcons is the only Naughty by Nature album where the group performed as a duo, as DJ Kay Gee left the group in 2000.

== Track listing ==
No.	Title	Writer(s)	Producer(s)	Length
1.	"Iicons"	Anthony Criss; Vinnie Brown; Reginald Brown	Genna; Naughty by Nature	3:56
2.	"Rock & Roll" (featuring Method Man & Redman)	Criss; Keith Watts; Bernard Griffin; Reggie Noble; Clifford Smith	Griff & Wok; Naughty by Nature	3:34
3.	"What You Wanna Do" (featuring Pink)	Criss; Brown; Junod Ettienne	Junod Ettienne; Naughty by Nature	4:45
4.	"Swing Swang"	Criss; Brown; Joel Campbell; Allen Gordon Jr.	Allstar	4:06
5.	"Rah Rah" (featuring Rottin Razkals)	Criss; Brown; Watts; Griffin; Abdullah Barr; Jeffery Ray	Griff & Wok; Naughty by Nature	4:18
6.	"Feels Good (Don't Worry Bout a Thing)" (featuring 3LW)	Criss; Brown; Gordon Jr.; Teron Beal; Nastacia C. Kendall; Dwayne Wiggins; Raphael Saadiq; Timothy Riley Clemon Jr.; Carl Wheeler	Allstar; Joel Campbell (add.); Teron Beal (voc.)	4:13
7.	"Let Me Find Out"	Criss; Brown; Raheem Gibson; Barry Smith	Rah-Nyse & Storm; Naughty by Nature	3:48
8.	"Naughty by Nature" (featuring Carl Thomas)	Criss; Carl Thomas; Walter Dewgarde; Klaus Günter Neumann; Willi Stanke	Da Beatminerz; Naughty by Nature	6:22
9.	"N.J. to L.A." (featuring Road Dawgs & Rottin Razkals)	Criss; Barr; Ray; Jose Matos; Omar Williams; Jonte Ray; Marcus Moore	King Shameek; Naughty by Nature	4:21
10.	"Red Light" (featuring Queen Latifah)	Criss; Brown; Gordon Jr.; Dana Owens	Allstar	4:42
11.	"Ashes to Ashes" (featuring Icarus & Bumpy Knuckles)	Criss; Richard Grant; Raymond Grant; Neil Phillips; Bumpy Knuckles	DJ Twinz; Naughty by Nature	5:34
12.	"What U Don't Know"	Criss; Brown; Marc Curry; Donald Woolfolk	Dream Team; Naughty by Nature	4:00
13.	"Wild Muthafuckas" (featuring Lil Jon & Chyna Whyte)	Criss; Brown; John Smith; Stephanie Martin	Lil Jon	5:39
14.	"Family Tree"	Criss; Brown; Dewgarde	Da Beatminerz; Naughty by Nature	5:30
Total length:				1:03:48

Sample credits

- "Feels Good (Don't Worry Bout a Thing)" contains replayed elements from "Feels Good", written by Dwayne Wiggins, Carl Wheeler, Raphael Saadiq, and Timothy Riley Clemon Jr.
- "Naughty by Nature" contains elements from "Wunderland bei Nacht", written by Klaus Günter Neumann and Willi Stanke.

== Charts ==
=== Weekly charts ===
Chart (2002)	Peak position
Australian Albums (ARIA)	77
Australian Urban Albums (ARIA)	10
Canadian Albums (Nielsen SoundScan)	71
Canadian R&B Albums (Nielsen SoundScan)	10
New Zealand Albums (RMNZ)	17
US Billboard 200	15
US Top R&B/Hip-Hop Albums (Billboard)	5

=== Year-end charts ===
Chart (2002)	Position
Canadian R&B Albums (Nielsen SoundScan)	164
Canadian Rap Albums (Nielsen SoundScan)	84
US Top R&B/Hip-Hop Albums (Billboard)	94
