= Naughty's Nicest =

Greatest hits album by Naughty by Nature
- Released: June 10, 2003
- Recorded: 1991–2003
- Genre: Hip hop
- Label: Tommy Boy/Rhino
- Producer: Naughty by Nature

Naughty by Nature chronology
Nature's Finest (1999)	Naughty's Nicest (2003)

Professional ratings
Review scores
Source	Rating
Allmusic	link

Naughty's Nicest is a compilation album released by Tommy Boy Records and Rhino Entertainment, containing the greatest hits of hip hop group Naughty by Nature.

== Track listing ==
1. "O.P.P." – 4:30
2. "Uptown Anthem" – 3:05
3. "Everything's Gonna Be Alright" – 4:51
4. "Guard Your Grill" – 5:03
5. "Wickedest Man Alive" – 4:20
6. "Everyday All Day" – 5:41
7. "1, 2, 3" – 4:44
8. "Yoke the Joker" – 5:13
9. "Hip Hop Hooray" – 4:23
10. "Written on Ya Kitten" – 4:22
11. "It's On" [Kay Gee Remix] – 3:05
12. "Poor Man's Poetry" – 2:59
13. "Feel Me Flow" – 3:33
14. "Craziest" – 4:08
15. "Mourn You Til I Join You" – 5:18
16. "Dirt All by My Lonely" – 3:15
