= Hip Hop Hooray =

1993 single by Naughty by Nature

Single by Naughty by Nature

from the album 19 Naughty III
- B-side: "The Hood Comes First"
- Released: January 19, 1993
- Genre: Hip-hop
- Length: 4:26
- Label: Tommy Boy
- Songwriters: Ronald Isley; Ernie Isley; Rudolph Isley; Chris Jasper; O'Kelly Isley Jr.; Marvin Isley; Vincent Brown; Anthony Criss; Keir Gist
- Producer: DJ Kay Gee

Naughty by Nature singles chronology
"Uptown Anthem" (1992)	"Hip Hop Hooray" (1993)	"It's On" (1993)

Music video
- "Hip Hop Hooray" (edited) on YouTube "Hip Hop Hooray" (original) on YouTube

"Hip Hop Hooray" is a song by the American hip hop group, Naughty by Nature, released on January 19, 1993, by Tommy Boy Records as the first single from their third album, 19 Naughty III (1993). The song spent one week at number 1 on the US Billboard Hot R&B/Hip-Hop Songs chart, and reached number 8 on the Billboard Hot 100. It contains samples from "Funky President" by James Brown, "Don't Change Your Love" by Five Stairsteps, "Make Me Say it Again, Girl" by Isley Brothers, "You Can't Turn Me Away" by Sylvia Striplin and "Sledgehammer" by Peter Gabriel. Pete Rock made a remix that samples Cannonball Adderley's "74 Miles Away". It was certified Platinum by the RIAA and has sold over 1,100,000 copies in the United States. The music video for "Hip Hop Hooray" was directed by Spike Lee and filmed in Brooklyn, New York City.

The song contains lyrics boasting the group's love of hip-hop and their fascination with good-looking women. The Seattle Mariners would play the song after Ken Griffey Jr. was officially announced coming to bat at the Kingdome, especially in 1995, the year of the Mariners' first Major League Baseball playoff appearance. It played at Yankee Stadium after a Yankees player hits a home run from 2017 until the middle of the 2019 season. It was brought back for the 2020 season and used until the 2022 season. In 2024, Billboard ranked "Hip Hop Hooray" number three in their "The 100 Greatest Jock Jams of All Time".

== Background and composition ==
Naughty by Nature member Vin Rock stated: "I knew the 'hey ho' chorus would connect to the East Coast partygoers because it was a popular saying at parties, roller rinks, etc. Once we incorporated it into the beat KayGee provided, I definitely felt confident it would be well received." He also said: "'Hip Hop Hooray' sums up what hip-hop culture is: a celebration of the inner city's ability to endure and create one of the largest music and art cultures in the world. It's the epitome of crowd participation and togetherness. Once people hear it, they immediately throw their hands in the air, wave and sing in unison. It's a song that will live forever."

Naughty by Nature member KayGee stated: "We like to call it our unofficial hip-hop anthem."

== Critical reception ==
In a 2018 retrospective review, Jesse Ducker from Albumism said the song is "just about as ubiquitous" as "O.P.P.". He added, "Most people remember the "Hey! Ho! Hey! Ho!" hook, but Treach and Vinnie Rock do a solid job trading four bar stanzas through the song's three verses. And Treach using "Tippy-tippy, pause, tippy-tippy pause" to describe him sneaking up on wack emcees is, if nothing else, creative." Upon the single release, Larry Flick from Billboard magazine described it as "invigorating", noting that "once again, an anthemic chorus is the anchor for clever rhymes and a contagious melody. Rap purists will dig raw groove/lyrical undercurrent, though glossy production will glide right into the hearts of radio programmers."

Reviewing 19 Naughty III, James Bernard from Entertainment Weekly stated, "Yes, there's an 'O.P.P.' on this one. 'Hip Hop Hooray' is as catchy as the charttopper this New Jersey rap trio rode to superstardom, only the new flavor is not quite as frisky." Jean Rosenbluth from the Los Angeles Times remarked that "the beats are mostly snappy and the rhymes catchy". The European magazine Music & Media commented, "One of the golden rules for a hit is a good hook. When these rappers repetitively shout "Hey Hoo", like cheerleaders, everyone will join in automatically. "Hot hit hurray!" if you ask us." James Hamilton from Music Week's RM Dance Update described it as a "moderately jaunty rap swayer". Touré from Rolling Stone named it a "strong single", and an "anthem". Rupert Howe from Select called it "over-catchy". Johnny Lee from Smash Hits felt it "sounds a bit" like Jazzy Jeff's "Summertime", giving it a score of three out of five.

== Music video ==
The accompanying music video for "Hip Hop Hooray" was directed by Spike Lee, who also appears in it. Queen Latifah, Eazy-E, Monie Love, Da Youngsta's, Kris Kross, Tupac Shakur and Run–D.M.C. also make appearances in the video. A second version of the video was later published on Tommy Boy Records' official YouTube channel on January 6, 2018, that has removed Eazy-E's appearance from the video, replacing it with footage from previous scenes. It is also missing the copyright message that was displayed at the end of the original version. It is unclear when this edited video was produced or what the reason was for Eazy-E's removal. The video had generated more than 33 million views as of January 2023. The original unedited video is available on Naughty by Nature's YouTube channel.

Talking about Eazy-E's cameo in the video, Vin Rock stated: "The cameo appearances were awesome, especially Eazy-E from NWA. He was resetting his career after parting ways with Dr. Dre. So Eazy spent a lot of time on the East Coast as well. KayGee and Treach wrote and produced a few songs for Eazy."

Naughty by Nature member KayGee stated: "Treach's initial idea for the video was to look like Fat Albert in the junkyard."

Vin Rock stated: "Director Spike Lee was super professional, had multiple setups ready for us, and he even pulled KayGee out of bed to get started because he didn't want to be late for his Knicks game!" Vin Rock also commented: "It was great to shoot in Brooklyn. Historically, if you weren't from the five boroughs you weren't respected as rappers, but Brooklyn definitely showed us Jersey boys tons of love."

== Legacy ==
In June 1994, "Hip Hop Hooray" won one of ASCAP's R&B Music Awards. In February 2024, Billboard magazine ranked the song number 3 in their list of "The 100 Greatest Jock Jams of All Time".

== Media usage ==
"Hip Hop Hooray" is featured as a playable track in the video game Rayman Raving Rabbids. In September 2017, the song was featured as one of the soundtracks of 2K's video game series, NBA 2K18.

Rita Wilson, actor, singer, and wife of another A-List entertainer, Tom Hanks, while in Australia, recovering from a bout with COVID-19, submitted a social media clip of herself performing the song. She later collaborated with members of Naughty By Nature to produce a remix of the song that posted on YouTube, to support a campaign, "MusiCares COVID-19 Relief Fund".

The song is played in the Simpsons episode "The Burns and The Bees", in which the basketball team's gorilla mascot costume is shot after making a basket.

The song is featured in Martin Scorsese's The Wolf of Wall Street (2013) during a yacht party celebrating Brad Bodnick after he finishes serving a jail sentence.

== Track listing ==
1. "Hip Hop Hooray" (LP Version)
2. "Hip Hop Hooray" (Extended Mix)
3. "The Hood Comes First" (LP Version)
4. "Hip Hop Hooray" (Instrumental)
5. "The Hood Comes First" (Instrumental)

== Charts ==
=== Weekly charts ===
Chart (1992–1993)	Peak position
Australia (ARIA)	33
Canada Retail Singles (The Record)	1
Canada Top Singles (RPM)	59
Canada Dance/Urban (RPM)	1
Europe (Eurochart Hot 100)	66
Europe (European Dance Radio)	1
Germany (GfK)	19
Ireland (IRMA)	23
Israel (Israeli Singles Chart)	18
Netherlands (Dutch Top 40)	24
Netherlands (Single Top 100)	21
New Zealand (Recorded Music NZ)	6
UK Singles (Official Charts)	22
UK Airplay (ERA)	58
UK Dance (Music Week)	5
UK Club Chart (Music Week)	26
US Billboard Hot 100	8
US Dance Club Songs (Billboard)	9
US Dance Singles Sales (Billboard)	1
US Hot R&B/Hip-Hop Songs (Billboard)	1
US Hot Rap Songs (Billboard)	3
US Cash Box Top 100	7

=== Year-end charts ===
Chart (1993)	Position
Canada Dance/Urban (RPM)	20
Europe (European Dance Radio)	6
Germany (Media Control)	88
New Zealand (RIANZ)	16
US Billboard Hot 100	45
US Hot R&B Singles (Billboard)	23
US Maxi-Singles Sales (Billboard)	20

Decade-end chart performance for "Hip Hop Hooray"
Chart (1990–1999)	Position
Canada (Nielsen SoundScan)	39

== Certifications ==
Region	Certification	Certified units/sales
New Zealand (RMNZ)	Gold	5,000^{*}
United States (RIAA)	Platinum	1,000,000^{^}
^{*} Sales figures based on certification alone.^{^} Shipments figures based on certification alone.

== See also ==
- List of number-one R&B singles of 1993 (U.S.)
