= Independent Leaders =

Studio album by the New Style
- Released: 1989
- Studios: Power Play (Long Island City, NY); Marion (Fairview, NJ); Quad (Manhattan, NY)
- Genre: East Coast hip hop
- Length: 38:10
- Label: Bon Ami/MCA
- Producers: The New Style; Swing; Unique

The New Style chronology
Independent Leaders (1989)	Naughty By Nature (1991)

Singles from Independent Leaders
- 1. "Scuffin' Those Knees" Released: 1989

Professional ratings
Review scores
Source	Rating
AllMusic	3/5 stars
RapReviews	7/10

Independent Leaders is the debut studio album by American hip hop trio the New Style. It was released in 1989, prior to Queen Latifah changing the group's name to Naughty by Nature. The album was produced mainly by the group.

== Track listing ==
All tracks are written by the New Style.

No.	Title	Producer(s)	Length
1.	"Scuffin' Those Knees"	The New Style	3:16
2.	"Start Smokin'"	The New Style	4:50
3.	"Picture Perfect"	Swing; the New Style	3:11
4.	"Can't Win for Losing"	The New Style	3:15
5.	"Droppin' the Bomb"	The New Style	3:18
6.	"To the Extreme"	The New Style	2:38
7.	"Independent Leader"	The New Style	4:26
8.	"New Vs. Style"	The New Style	3:37
9.	"Smooth Mood"	Unique; the New Style	3:59
10.	"Bring the Rock"	The New Style	3:32
Total length:			38:10

== Personnel ==
- Kier Lamont Gist – performer, producer
- Anthony Shawn Criss – performer, producer
- Vincent E. Brown – performer, producer
- Denarius Hemphill – producer (track 9)
- Swing – producer (track 3)
- Ivan Rodriguez – mixing, engineering
- David Darlington – mixing
- Dwayne Sumal – engineering
- Steve Hall – mastering
- Hemu Aggarwal – art direction
- Gene Crawford – photography
