= Naughty by Nature (album) =

Studio album by Naughty by Nature
- Released: September 3, 1991
- Recorded: 1990 – 1991
- Studios: Unique Recording Studios, New York City
- Genre: East Coast hip-hop
- Length: 60:15
- Label: Tommy Boy
- Producers: Naughty by Nature; Luis Vega

Naughty by Nature chronology
Independent Leaders (1989)	Naughty by Nature (1991)	19 Naughty III (1993)

Singles from Naughty by Nature
- 1. "O.P.P." Released: August 24, 1991; 2. "Everything's Gonna Be Alright" Released: November 26, 1991; 3. "Uptown Anthem" Released: January 22, 1992

Naughty by Nature is the second album from Naughty by Nature, released on September 3, 1991, by Tommy Boy Records. It was a critical and commercial success, having been certified Platinum on February 6, 1992, thanks in large part to the hit single, "O.P.P.," which reached number 6 on the Billboard Hot 100 in 1991.

Additional singles released from the album were "Everything's Gonna Be All Right" and "Uptown Anthem," both of which were minor hits on the Billboard charts.

== Reception ==
Professional ratings
Review scores
Source	Rating
AllMusic	4.5/5 stars
Robert Christgau	(choice cut)
Entertainment Weekly	A
Los Angeles Times	3/4 stars
NME	6/10
The Rolling Stone Album Guide	3/5 stars

Stanton Swihart of AllMusic claims that "O.P.P." was the most "contagious crossover radio smash in the autumn of 1991." In addition, Swihart considers Naughty by Nature to be "both a pop and a rap classic," as well as a "must-have album for fans of East Coast rap."

== Track listing ==
1. "Yoke the Joker" – 5:13
2. "Wickedest Man Alive (feat. Queen Latifah)" – 4:21
3. "O.P.P." – 4:31
4. "Everything's Gonna Be Alright" – 4:51
5. "Let the Ho's Go" – 4:16
6. "Every Day All Day" – 5:41
7. "Guard Your Grill" – 5:02
8. "Pin the Tail on the Donkey" – 3:47
9. "1, 2, 3 (feat. Lakim Shabazz and Apache)" – 4:44
10. "Strike a Nerve" – 6:22
11. "Rhyme'll Shine On (feat. Aphrodity)" – 3:56
12. "Thankx for Sleepwalking" – 5:26
13. "Uptown Anthem" – 3:04
- "Everything's Gonna Be Alright" is known as "Ghetto Bastard" on certain explicit releases.
- "Uptown Anthem" first appeared on the Juice soundtrack and did not appear on early releases of the album.
- "Pin the Tail on the Donkey" appears on the soundtrack for Tony Hawk's Pro Skater 2.

== Samples ==
"Yoke the Joker"

- "Synthetic Substitution" by Melvin Bliss

"Wickedest Man Alive"

- "Big Beat" by Billy Squier

"O.P.P."

- "ABC" by Jackson 5
- "Oh Honey" by Delegation
- "Synthetic Substitution" by Melvin Bliss

"Everything's Gonna Be Alright"

- "Hihache" by Lafayette Afro Rock Band
- "I'll Take You There" by Staple Singers
- "No Woman, No Cry" by Bob Marley

"Let the Ho's Go"

- "Bass (How Low Can You Go)" by Simon Harris
- "Pocahontas" by Maynard Ferguson
- "Take Me to the Mardi Gras" by Bob James

"Every Day All Day"

- "Pride and Vanity" by Ohio Players

"Guard Your Grill"

- "Funky Drummer" by James Brown

"Pin the Tail on the Donkey"

- "I Don't Know What This World Is Coming To" by Wattstax
- "Welcome to the Terrordome" by Public Enemy

"1, 2, 3"

- "Candy Man" by Quincy Jones
- "The Last Song" by Above the Law
- "It's Funky Enough" by The D.O.C.

"Rhyme'll Shine On"

- "Devotion (Live)" by Earth, Wind & Fire
- "You'll Like It Too" by Funkadelic
- "For the Love of You" by Isley Brothers

"Thankx for Sleepwalking"

- "You Know My Name (Look Up the Number)" by The Beatles

== Charts ==
=== Weekly charts ===
Chart (1991)	Peak position
US Billboard 200	16
US Top R&B/Hip-Hop Albums (Billboard)	10

=== Year-end charts ===
Chart (1991)	Position
US Top R&B/Hip-Hop Albums (Billboard)	94

Chart (1992)	Position
US Billboard 200	47
US Top R&B/Hip-Hop Albums (Billboard)	62

=== Singles ===
Year	Song	Chart positions				
Year	Song	Billboard Hot 100	Hot R&B/Hip-Hop Singles & Tracks	Hot Rap Singles	Hot Dance Music/Maxi-Singles Sales	Hot Dance Music/Club Play
1991	"O.P.P."	6	5	1	1	7
1992	"Everything's Gonna Be Alright"	53	12	9	8	-
1992	"Uptown Anthem"	-	58	27	16	-

== Certifications ==
Region	Certification	Certified units/sales
Canada (Music Canada)	Gold	50,000^{^}
United States (RIAA)	Platinum	1,000,000^{^}
^{^} Shipments figures based on certification alone.
