= Nineteen Naughty Nine: Nature's Fury =

Studio album by Naughty by Nature
- Released: April 27, 1999
- Genre: Hip-hop
- Length: 59:42
- Label: Arista
- Producers: Naughty by Nature; Donald Robinson; Falonte Moore

Naughty by Nature chronology
| Poverty's Paradise (1995) | Nineteen Naughty Nine: Nature's Fury (1999) | IIcons (2002) |

Singles from Nineteen Naughty Nine: Nature's Fury
- 1. "Dirt All by My Lonely" Released: March 23, 1999; 2. "Live or Die" Released: May 11, 1999; 3. "Jamboree" Released: June 15, 1999; 4. "Holiday" Released: October 20, 1999

Professional ratings
Review scores
| Source | Rating |
|---|---|
| Allmusic | 3/5 stars |
| Chicago Tribune | (favorable) |
| Entertainment Weekly | A− |
| Melody Maker | 2.5/5 stars |
| NME | (7/10) |
| Q | 3/5 stars |
| Robert Christgau | (neither) |
| Rolling Stone | 3.5/5 stars |
| Spin | (7/10) |

Nineteen Naughty Nine: Nature's Fury is the fifth studio album by Naughty by Nature, which was released on April 27, 1999, as their first and only album for Arista Records. The album was a success, peaking at 22 on the Billboard 200 and produced a big comeback hit for the group with "Jamboree", which reached #10 on the Billboard Hot 100.

Three additional singles, "Dirt All By My Lonely", "Live or Die" and "Holiday", all had minor success on the charts.

Due to drama with Treach involving the group's finances, DJ Kay Gee would leave the group a year and a half following the album's release until 2000.

== Track listing ==
| No. | Title | Writer(s) | Producer(s) | Length |
|---|---|---|---|---|
| 1. | "Intro" | Keir Gist; Vincent Brown; Anthony Criss | Naughty by Nature | 0:35 |
| 2. | "Ring the Alarm" | Gist; Brown; Criss | Naughty by Nature | 3:57 |
| 3. | "Dirt All By My Lonely" | Gist; Brown; Criss; Les McCann | Naughty by Nature | 3:14 |
| 4. | "Holiday" (featuring Phiness) | Gist; Brown; Criss; Davide Romani; Tanyayette Willoughby | Naughty by Nature | 4:08 |
| 5. | "Live or Die" (featuring Master P, Silkk the Shocker, Mystikal and Phiness) | Gist; Brown; Criss; Silkk the Shocker; Mystikal; Walter Becker; Donald Fagen | Naughty by Nature; Mufi | 3:41 |
| 6. | "On the Run" | Gist; Brown; Criss; Hank Shocklee; Carlton Ridenhour | Naughty by Nature | 3:21 |
| 7. | "Radio" (featuring Rustic Overtones) | Gist; Brown; Criss | Naughty by Nature | 4:37 |
| 8. | "Jamboree" (featuring Zhané) | Gist; Brown; Criss; Benny Golson | Naughty by Nature | 3:34 |
| 9. | "Would've Done the Same for Me" (featuring Koffee Brown) | Gist; Brown; Criss; Randy DeBarge; El DeBarge; Etterlene Jordan | Naughty by Nature | 4:18 |
| 10. | "Thugs & Hustlers" (featuring Mag and Krayzie Bone) | Gist; Brown; Criss; Anthony Henderson | Donald Robinson; Falonte Moore | 3:28 |
| 11. | "Work" (featuring Mag and Castro) | Gist; Falonte Moore; Criss; Donald Robinson; Kyron Sumpter; Norman Whitfield | KayGee; Falonte Moore | 3:20 |
| 12. | "We Could Do It" (featuring Big Punisher) | Gist; Brown; Criss; Christopher Rios; John Watson | Naughty by Nature | 4:48 |
| 13. | "The Blues" (featuring Next) | Gist; Brown; Criss; Robert Lavelle Huggar | Naughty by Nature | 3:49 |
| 14. | "Wicked Bounce" | Gist; Brown; Criss; Lorraine Whittlesey | Naughty by Nature | 3:54 |
| 15. | "Live Then Lay" (featuring Phiness) | Gist; Brown; Criss; George Johnson; Louis Johnson | Naughty by Nature | 4:01 |
| 16. | "The Shivers" (featuring Chain Gang Platune) | Gist; Brown; Criss | Platune Sounds | 4:57 |

Notes

- "Intro" contains vocals from Castro.
- "We Could Do It" contains additional vocals from Tony Sunshine and Cliff Lighty.

Sample credits

- "Dirt All By My Lonely" contains samples from "Uptown Anthem"; written by Keir Gist, Vincent Brown, and Anthony Criss; and performed by Naughty by Nature.
- "Dirt All By My Lonely" contains replayed elements from "The Morning Song", written by Les McCann.
- "Holiday" contains replayed elements from "A Lover's Holiday", written by Davide Romani and Tanyayette Willoughby.
- "Live or Die" contains replayed elements from "Third World Man", written by Walter Becker and Donald Fagen.
- "On the Run" contains samples of "Miuzi Weighs a Ton", written by Hank Shocklee and Carlton Ridenhour, and performed by Public Enemy.
- "Jamboree" contains samples of "I'm Always Dancin' to the Music", written and performed by Benny Golson.
- "Would've Done the Same for Me" contains replayed elements from "I Like It", written by Randy DeBarge, El DeBarge, and Etterlene Jordan.
- "Work" contains replayed elements from "Car Wash", written by Norman Whitfield.
- "We Could Do It" contains replayed elements from "I Wanna Thank You", written by John Watson.
- "Wicked Bounce" contains replayed elements from "How Can You Live Without Me", written by Lorraine Whittlesey.
- "Live Then Lay" contains replayed elements from "Free Yourself, Be Yourself", written by George Johnson and Louis Johnson.

== Chart performance ==
=== Weekly charts ===
| Chart (1999) | Peak position |
|---|---|
| Australian Albums (ARIA) | 43 |
| German Albums (Offizielle Top 100) | 94 |
| US Billboard 200 | 22 |
| US Top R&B/Hip-Hop Albums (Billboard) | 9 |

=== Year-end charts ===
| Chart (1999) | Position |
|---|---|
| US Top R&B/Hip-Hop Albums (Billboard) | 93 |

=== Singles ===
| Year | Song | Chart positions | | |
| Year | Song | Billboard Hot 100 | Hot R&B/Hip-Hop Songs | Hot Rap Songs |
|---|---|---|---|---|
| 1999 | "Live Or Die" | - | 86 | - |
| 1999 | "Jamboree" | 10 | 4 | 1 |

== Certifications ==
| Region | Certification | Certified units/sales |
|---|---|---|
| United States (RIAA) | Gold | 500,000^{^} |
^{^} Shipments figures based on certification alone.
