= Mourn You Til I Join You =

Single by Naughty by Nature

from the album Ride (soundtrack)
- B-side: "Nothing to Lose"
- Released: October 28, 1997
- Recorded: 1997
- Genre: Hip hop
- Length: 5:17
- Label: Tommy Boy
- Songwriter(s): Anthony Criss
- Producer(s): Naughty by Nature

Naughty by Nature singles chronology
"Feel Me Flow" (1995)	"Mourn You Til I Join You" (1997)	"Dirt All by My Lonely" (1999)

"Mourn You Til I Join You" is a single by Naughty by Nature from the Ride soundtrack. It was released on October 28, 1997 and was their last release for Tommy Boy Records. The song was dedicated to the group's friend, Tupac Shakur and was about lead rapper, Treach's relationship with Tupac. The song was a minor success, peaking at 51 on the Billboard Hot 100 and 2 on the Hot Rap Singles. The song was originally set to appear on 1997's Nothing to Lose soundtrack, but Tommy Boy instead chose to include it on 1998's Ride soundtrack.

== Track listing ==
=== A-side ===
1. "Mourn You Til I Join You" (Album Version) – 5:18
2. "Mourn You Til I Join You" (Instrumental) – 5:04

=== B-side ===
1. "Nothing to Lose (Naughty Live)" (Album Version) – 4:10
2. "Nothing to Lose (Naughty Live)" (Instrumental) – 4:10

== Charts ==
Chart performance for "Mourn You Til I Join You"
Chart (1997)	Peak position
Australia (ARIA)	61
New Zealand (Recorded Music NZ)	11
US Billboard Hot 100	51
US Hot R&B/Hip-Hop Songs (Billboard)	24
US Hot Rap Songs (Billboard)	2
