= Uptown Anthem =

Single by Naughty by Nature

from the album Juice and Naughty by Nature
- Released: May 12, 1992
- Studio: Unique (New York)
- Genre: Hip-hop
- Length: 3:03
- Label: Tommy Boy; Soul
- Songwriters: Vincent Brown; Anthony Criss; Keir Gist
- Producer: DJ Kay Gee

Naughty by Nature singles chronology
"Everything's Gonna Be Alright" (1991)	"Uptown Anthem" (1992)	"Hip Hop Hooray" (1993)

Music video
- "Uptown Anthem" on YouTube

"Uptown Anthem" is a 1992 song by hip-hop group Naughty by Nature. It was made for the soundtrack for the movie Juice. Naughty by Nature rapper Treach had a cameo acting role in the movie. Rapper 2Pac, who stars in the film, is featured in the video.

The song peaked at No. 27 on the Hot Rap Singles chart and No. 58 on the Hot R&B Singles chart. It was also included as the final track and the last single from the group's 1991 eponymous second album.

Jermaine Dupri sampled "Uptown Anthem" for the Jagged Edge track "Shady Girl" from the album Hard.

Rapper Tupac Shakur sampled the song for his "Intro/Bomb First (My Second Reply)".

The song appeared in the 2016 video game Watch Dogs 2.
