= 19 Naughty III =

Studio album by Naughty by Nature
- Released: February 23, 1993
- Studios: Unique Recording Studios, New York City
- Genre: East Coast hip-hop
- Length: 57:41
- Labels: Tommy Boy; Warner Bros.
- Producers: Naughty by Nature; S.I.D. Reynolds

Naughty by Nature chronology
Naughty by Nature (1991)	19 Naughty III (1993)	Poverty's Paradise (1995)

Singles from 19 Naughty III
- 1. "Hip Hop Hooray" Released: December 10, 1992 (US); May 18, 1993 (UK); 2. "It's On" Released: June 8, 1993; 3. "Written on Ya Kitten" Released: September 28, 1993

19 Naughty III is the third album from Naughty by Nature, released on February 23, 1993, through Tommy Boy Records. Recording sessions took place at Unique Recording Studios, Soundtrack Studios and Electric Lady Studios in New York City. Three singles were released from the album, the group's second top 10 hit, "Hip Hop Hooray," as well as the minor hits "It's On" and "Written on Ya Kitten." Production was handled entirely by group member Kay Gee himself, with additional production from S.I.D. Reynolds. It includes guest appearances from Heavy D, Queen Latifah, Freddie Foxxx and Rottin Razkals.

== Reception ==
Professional ratings
Review scores
Source	Rating
AllMusic	4/5 stars
Robert Christgau	(choice cut)
Entertainment Weekly	A−
Q	3/5 stars
Rolling Stone	4/5 stars
The Rolling Stone Album Guide	3/5 stars
Select	3/5 medals
The Source	3.5/5 stars

The album did well commercially and critically, with 4-star ratings from AllMusic and Rolling Stone and Platinum certification from the RIAA. AllMusic stated in its review that the album ranked "as Naughty by Nature's second straight triumph."

== Track listing ==
1. "19 Naughty III" – 4:42
2. "Hip Hop Hooray" – 4:26
3. "Ready for Dem" (feat. Heavy D) – 4:06
4. "Take It to Ya Face" – 3:18
5. "Daddy Was a Street Corner" – 4:21
6. "The Hood Comes First" – 3:36
7. "The Only Ones" – 3:18
8. "It's On" – 5:03
9. "Cruddy Clique" – 2:43
10. "Knock Em Out da Box (feat. Rottin Razkals)" – 2:09
11. "Hot Potato" (feat. Freddie Foxxx) – 5:00
12. "Sleepin' on Jersey (feat. Queen Latifah)" – 2:51
13. "Written on Ya Kitten" – 4:21
14. "Sleepwalkin' II / Shout Outs" – 7:43

== Charts ==
=== Weekly charts ===
Chart (1993)	Peak position
Australian Albums (ARIA)	74
Dutch Albums (Album Top 100)	64
German Albums (Offizielle Top 100)	41
New Zealand Albums (RMNZ)	42
Swiss Albums (Schweizer Hitparade)	40
UK Albums (Official Charts)	40
US Billboard 200	3
US Top R&B/Hip-Hop Albums (Billboard)	1

=== Year-end charts ===
Chart (1993)	Position
US Billboard 200	67
US Top R&B/Hip-Hop Albums (Billboard)	17

=== Singles ===
Year	Song	Chart positions		
Year	Song	Billboard Hot 100	Hot R&B/Hip-Hop Singles & Tracks	Hot Rap Singles
1993	"Hip Hop Hooray"	8	1	3
1993	"It's On"	74	43	-
1993	"Written on Ya Kitten"	93	53	-

== Certifications ==
Region	Certification	Certified units/sales
Canada (Music Canada)	Gold	50,000^{^}
United States (RIAA)	Platinum	1,000,000^{^}
^{^} Shipments figures based on certification alone.

== See also ==
- List of Billboard number-one R&B albums of 1993
