= O.P.P. (song) =

Single by Naughty by Nature

from the album Naughty by Nature
- B-side: "The Wickedest Man Alive"
- Released: August 24, 1991
- Recorded: 1991
- Studio: Unique Recording Studios , New York City
- Genre: Hip-hop
- Length: 4:31 (album version); 6:41 (Ultimix remix)
- Label: Tommy Boy
- Songwriters: Vincent Brown; Anthony Criss; Keir Gist; The Corporation; Herb Rooney
- Producer: Naughty by Nature

Naughty by Nature singles chronology
| "Scuffin' Those Knees" (1989) | "O.P.P." (1991) | "Everything's Gonna Be Alright" (1991) |

Music video
- "O.P.P." on YouTube

"O.P.P." is a song by the American hip-hop group Naughty by Nature, released in August 1991 by Tommy Boy as the lead single from the group's second album Naughty by Nature (1991). It was one of the first rap songs to become a pop hit when it reached No. 6 on the US Billboard Hot 100 and No. 35 on the UK Singles Chart. Rodd Houston and Marcus Raboy directed the music video for the song. Its declaration, "Down wit' O.P.P." was a popular catchphrase in the US in the early 1990s.

The song was a hugely successful single; Spin magazine named it one of the greatest singles of the 1990s. It also made some media outlets' lists of one of the best rap songs of all time: including The Source, VH1 (No. 22), and Rolling Stone (No. 80). The song was also ranked No. 20 in VH1's "40 Greatest Hip Hop Songs of the '90s" in 2012 and No. 96 in Billboard magazine's "500 Best Pop Songs of All Time" in 2023.

== Content ==
The song samples Melvin Bliss' "Synthetic Substitution" and the Jackson 5's "ABC". Its lyrics concern sexual infidelity, with "O.P.P." standing for "other people's pussy" and "other people's penis". Treach told in an interview with New York Times, "'O.P.P.' is about crazy messing with other people's girls. Everybody knows about that, girls messing, guys messing, you know the bit. It goes on, so everybody could relate, the fellas and the girls, and it's got a hook for the party and everybody can crazy groove to it."

== Critical reception ==
Upon the single release, Larry Flick from Billboard magazine remarked that "here, the act drops samples of the Jackson Five's "ABC" onto "a rousing hip-hop beat-base. Anthemic rhymes are icing on the cake. Have a taste." James Bernard from Entertainment Weekly described it as "a sly, body-rocking tune with a melodic pop hook and plenty of cute double entendres". Dennis Hunt from Los Angeles Times named it a "lively, lewd hit single", "which is cleverly constructed on the framework of the Jackson 5’s bubble-gum soul classic". David Bennun from Melody Maker called it "a genitally-fixated rap on the joys of infidelity". A reviewer from Music & Media felt "It's further proof of the new direction in rap heading more towards a normal pop song. The combination of the piano hook and the female backup makes this funky rhyme memorable."

Peter Watrous from New York Times wrote, "There are a couple of signs that 'O.P.P.', an old-fashioned cheating song by Naughty by Nature [...] is shaping up as one of the summer's hits on local streets. The first indication is the sound of 'O.P.P' coming from the back of Jeeps; the second is that bootleg T-shirts advertising the band—Trech (Trech Criss), Vin Rock (Vinnie Brown) and Kay Gee (Keir Gist) -- are being sold all over lower Manhattan." Johnny Lee from Smash Hits declared the song as "everso jumpy". Scott Poulson-Bryant from Spin said, "I'm definitely down with 'O.P.P.'—you will be too."

== Retrospective response ==
German rock and pop culture magazine Spex included "O.P.P." in their "The Best Singles of the Century" list in 1999. In a 2021 retrospective review, Jesse Ducker from Albumism said about the song, "It's one of the most light-hearted songs about infidelity this side of Clarence Carter's 'Back Door Santa', as Treach gleefully lists the virtues of engaging in sexual congress with someone else's girl." Stanton Swihart of AllMusic felt it's "a song that somehow managed the trick of being both audaciously catchy and subversively coy at the same time." He added, "Its irrepressible appeal was so widespread, in fact, that it played just as well to the hardcore heads in the hood as it did to the hip-hop dabblers in the suburbs." Jean Rosenbluth from Los Angeles Times stated, "The fabulously wicked chant 'O.P.P.' masterfully captured hip-hop's silly side even better than that genre's prime exponent, Digital Underground." In October 2023, Billboard magazine ranked it number 96 in their "500 Best Pop Songs of All Time", saying, "Three decades later, all it takes is the opening piano plinks to remind even the most conservative ‘90s kid that deep down, damn skippy, they’re still a card-carrying member." Same year, Time Out ranked "O.P.P." number 60 in their "The 100 Best Party Songs Ever Made".

== Music video ==
A music video was produced to promote the single, directed by Rodd Houston and Marcus Raboy. It begins with a man removing his wedding ring and dropping it. The group raps at a club behind a fence and people dance behind them. The video was later made available on Naughty by Nature's official YouTube channel in 2010, and had generated more than 29 million views as of September 2025.

== Track listing ==
1. "O.P.P." (vocal)
2. "Wickedest Man Alive" (vocal)
3. "O.P.P." (Sunny Days remix)
4. "Wickedest Man Alive" (instrumental)
5. "O.P.P." (instrumental)

== Official versions ==
- "O.P.P." (album version)
- "O.P.P." (vocal)
- "O.P.P." (instrumental)
- "O.P.P." (Sunny Days remix)

== Charts ==
=== Weekly charts ===
Weekly chart performance for "O.P.P."
| Chart (1991–1992) | Peak position |
|---|---|
| Australia (ARIA) | 31 |
| Canada Top Singles (RPM) | 56 |
| Canada Dance/Urban (RPM) | 4 |
| Germany (GfK) | 25 |
| Israel (Israeli Singles Chart) | 31 |
| Netherlands (Dutch Top 40) | 27 |
| Netherlands (Single Top 100) | 20 |
| New Zealand (Recorded Music NZ) | 11 |
| Switzerland (Schweizer Hitparade) | 6 |
| UK Singles (OCC) | 35 |
| UK Dance (Music Week) | 12 |
| UK Club Chart (Record Mirror) | 36 |
| US Billboard Hot 100 | 6 |
| US Dance Club Songs (Billboard) | 7 |
| US Dance Singles Sales (Billboard) | 1 |
| US Hot R&B/Hip-Hop Songs (Billboard) | 5 |
| US Hot Rap Songs (Billboard) | 1 |

=== Year-end charts ===
Year-end chart performance for "O.P.P."
| Chart (1991) | Position |
|---|---|
| US Billboard Hot 100 | 94 |

| Chart (1992) | Position |
|---|---|
| New Zealand (Recorded Music NZ) | 26 |

== Certifications ==
Certifications for "O.P.P."
| Region | Certification | Certified units/sales |
|---|---|---|
| New Zealand (RMNZ) | Platinum | 30,000^{‡} |
| United Kingdom (BPI) | Silver | 200,000^{‡} |
| United States (RIAA) | 2× Platinum | 2,000,000^{^} |
^{^} Shipments figures based on certification alone.^{‡} Sales+streaming figures based on certification alone.

== In popular culture ==
The song has been used as a soundtrack to various films as well as television series, including the TV sitcoms The Fresh Prince of Bel-Air and The Office, and the films La Haine, Jarhead, and Up in the Air. In the film Sister Act 2: Back In The Habit, the song was parodied as 'Down With G.O.D'. In the video game Minecraft, the phrase "Down with O.P.P.!" was used as a splash text which appeared on the game's menu screen. The splash was added on February 7, 2010 in Java Edition version Indev 20100207-1 but was later removed in version 1.16 Release Candidate 1 on June 18, 2020. The song was also featured in Dexter: Original Sin.
