= Rottin Razkals =

Hip hop group from New Jersey

- Origin: East Orange, New Jersey, USA
- Genres: Hip hop
- Years active: 1993–2002
- Labels: Mad Sounds/Motown
- Members: Chap; Fam; Diesel

The Rottin Razkals were an American hip hop group signed to Motown Records' sub-label, Mad Sounds Recordings. Composed of three members, Chap, Fam, and Diesel (Treach's younger brother), the group was closely associated with Naughty by Nature, first appearing on their 1993 album, 19 Naughty III on the song "Knock Em Out Da Box". Eventually landing a deal with Motown, the Rottin Razkals' debut album, Rottin ta da Core, was released on March 14, 1995. Though the album did not make it very high on the charts, only peaking at #190 on the Billboard 200, two singles from the album found some success on the Hot Rap Singles chart, "Hey Alright" and "Oh Yeah" made it to #23 and #14 on the chart respectively. The group has yet to release a second album, but they did appear on Naughty by Nature's albums, Poverty's Paradise and IIcons.

== Discography ==
=== Studio albums ===
Year	Title	Chart positions	
Year	Title	U.S.	U.S. R&B
1995	Rottin ta da Core: Released: March 14, 1995; Label: Mad Sounds	190	28
