= Treach =

American rapper (born 1970)

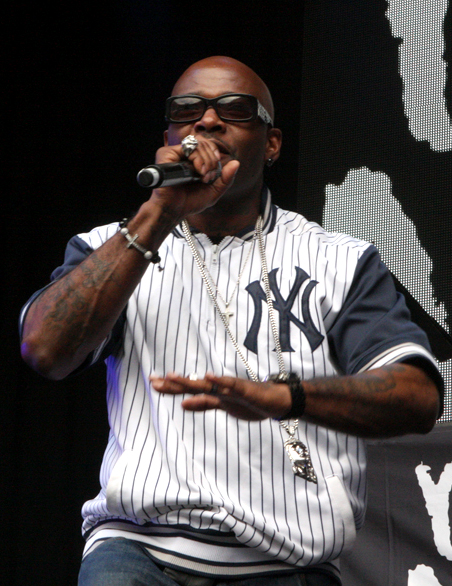
- Treach in 2012
- Born: Anthony Shawn Criss; December 2, 1970 (age 55); East Orange, New Jersey, U.S.
- Occupations: Rapper; actor
- Spouse(s): Pepa (m. 1999; div. 2001) Cicely Evans (m. 2019)
- Children: 3
- Musical career
- Genre: Hip-hop
- Instrument: Vocals
- Years active: 1986–present
- Labels: TVT; MCA; Tommy Boy; Warner Bros.; Arista; BMG
- Member of: Naughty by Nature
- Website: naughtybynature.com

Anthony Shawn Criss (born December 2, 1970), better known by his stage name Treach, is an American rapper and actor. He is best known as the lead rapper of the hip hop group Naughty by Nature.

== Early life, family and education ==
Criss was born on December 2, 1970, in East Orange, New Jersey. Criss attended East Orange Campus High School

== Career ==
Treach formed the hip hop group Naughty by Nature (originally named New Style) with high school friends Vin Rock and DJ Kay Gee in 1986.

After rising to fame for his music, Treach began acting in guest roles on television series and movies. Some of the TV series include CSI: Crime Scene Investigation, Person of Interest, Blue Bloods. Some of his movies include Juice (1992), The Meteor Man (1993), Jason's Lyric (1994), and a starring role in Love and a Bullet (2002).

In Love and a Bullet, Treach became one of the first rappers to show full-frontal nudity in a film. He also starred in the pornographic film Treach's Naturally Naughty Porno Movie.

== Personal life ==
Treach is the older brother of Diesel, who is also a rapper and who is a member of the Rottin Razkals, a group closely affiliated with Naughty by Nature.

Treach had a close friendship with rapper Tupac Shakur. They collaborated on Shakur's song "5 Deadly Venomz" and Treach appeared in his music videos for "So Many Tears" and "Temptations. After 2Pac died in 1996, Treach released the song "Mourn You Til I Join You" about their friendship.

=== Marriages ===
Treach was married to Sandra Denton, better known as Pepa of the hip hop group Salt-n-Pepa, from July 1999 until 2001. The couple had one daughter in 1998. Denton documented the marriage in her 2008 memoir Let's Talk About Pepa, which included allegations of abuse. In April 2017, Treach responded on Instagram, saying they were all false.

According to VH1, Treach has been with his common-law wife Cicely Evans since 2004. They have two children together. The couple starred on season 5 of Couples Therapy on VH1 in 2014. Treach and Evans married on September 8, 2019, in New Jersey.

=== Legal issues ===
Treach was arrested in Union City, New Jersey, on April 10, 2014. He allegedly passed traffic police in his Cadillac Escalade at 55 miles per hour in a 25-mile per hour zone and attempted to elude law enforcement officers after being given a signal to stop, leading them on a high-speed chase for nine blocks before stopping. He then left his vehicle and ran towards the police car; the officers drew their weapons and ordered him to return to his vehicle. Treach later complied with the officers' orders and was cited for reckless driving, speeding and driving with a suspended license. Officers also found there was a warrant for his arrest out of Essex County, New Jersey, for failing to appear at a hearing related to child support, and warrants out of Union City and Secaucus, New Jersey, for failing to appear at hearings related to motor vehicle violations. He made his first court appearance on the charge in Jersey City, New Jersey, on April 11 and spent the night in Hudson County jail in Kearny before being released after posting $15,000 bail.

== Discography ==
Studio albums

- Independent Leaders (1989)
- Naughty by Nature (1991)
- 19 Naughty III (1993)
- Poverty's Paradise (1995)
- Nineteen Naughty Nine: Nature's Fury (1999)
- IIcons (2002)
- Anthem Inc. (2011)

== Filmography ==
=== Film ===
Year	Title	Role	Notes
1992	Juice	Radames' Homie	
1993	The Meteor Man	Blood	
1994	Jason's Lyric	Alonzo	
1997	First Time Felon	Tyrone	TV movie
2000	Boricua's Bond	-	
2000	The Contract	Bishop	Short
2000	Rhapsody	Friend	TV movie
2001	3 A.M.	Bass	
2002	Face	Michael	
2002	Empire	Chedda	
2002	Book of Love	Jay Black	
2002	Baseball Wives	Carl	TV movie
2002	Love and a Bullet	Malik Bishop	
2002	Conviction	Tank	TV movie
2003	El Chupacabra	Dr. Goodspeed	
2003	F.A.T.	Ralf	
2005	Today You Die	Ice Kool	
2005	The Game Is Dead	Muta	Video
2005	Feast	Vet	
2006	Park	Tow Truck Driver	
2006	Connors War	Connors	Video
2006	13 Graves	Inglewood Jake	TV movie
2007	Playas Ball	Ricardo Perez	
2008	The Verdict	Reverend Toussaint	TV movie
2008	Ca$h Rules	Trouble	Video
2009	A Day in the Life	Armor	
2009	The Art of War III: Retribution	Agent Neil Shaw	Video
2009	Before I Self Destruct	Cedrick	Video
2012	Zoo	-	
2012	One Blood	Malcome Smith	
2013	Atlantic Rim	Lieutenant Jim Rushing	Video
2013	The Lost Book of Rap	Pac	Short
2017	Six 2 Six	Curtis Taylor	
2020	Equal Standard	Trigger	
2020	For NYC	-	Short
2022	Vanished: Searching for My Sister	Coogi	TV movie
2022	Lord of the Streets	Jason Dyson	

=== Television ===
Year	Title	Role	Notes
1995	House of Style	Himself	Episode: "Fall Edition"
1995	New York Undercover	Sheik	Episode: "You Get No Respect"
1999	Oz	Malcolm 'Snake' Coyle	Recurring Cast: Season 3
2001–02	Soul Food	Philky	Episode: "I'm Afraid of Americans" & "A Taste of Justice"
2002	Third Watch	Vernon	Episode: "Crime and Punishment: Part 1 & 2"
2003	Fastlane	Cyrus	Episode: "Defense"
2005	Law & Order: Trial by Jury	Bruno Johnson	Episode: "41 Shots"
2006	VH1 Goes Inside	Himself	Episode: "Yo! MTV Raps"
2006	The Sopranos	Marvin	Episode: "The Fleshy Part of the Thigh"
2009	Law & Order: Criminal Intent	Reginald X. Oldman	Episode: "Salome in Manhattan"
2013	Person of Interest	Reginald 'Reverb' Marshall	Episode: "Reasonable Doubt"
2014	CSI: Crime Scene Investigation	Lincoln Mayfield	Episode: "Let's Make A Deal"
2014	Couples Therapy	Himself	Cast Member: Season 5
2015	Come Back Kings	Himself	Main Cast
2015	The Player	Reaper	Episode: "Downtown Odds"
2016	Love & Hip Hop	Himself	Episode: "Endings + Beginnings"
2016	The Night Of	Willy John	Episode: "The Season of the Witch" & "Samson and Delilah"
2017	Blue Bloods	Tyrell Green	Episode: "Pick Your Poison"
2017	Hip Hop Squares	Himself/Contestant	Episode: "Downtown Odds"
2019	Growing Up Hip Hop	Himself	Episode: "A Proposal in the Heir"
2020–22	The Family Business	Brother X	Recurring Cast: Season 2 & 4, Guest: Season 3
2022	This Fool	Randy	Episode: "Sandy Says"
