= Naughty by Nature =

American hip hop trio

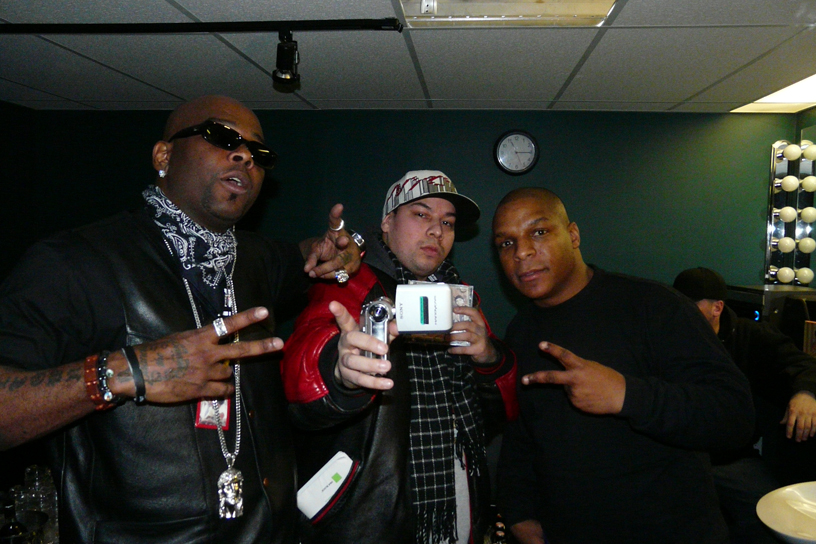
- Naughty by Nature members Treach (left) and Vin Rock (right) in 2009

Background information
- Also known as: The New Style
- Origin: East Orange, New Jersey, U.S.
- Genre: East Coast hip-hop
- Years active: 1986–2002; 2006–present
- Labels: MCA; TVT; Tommy Boy; Warner Bros.; Arista; BMG
- Spinoffs: Illtown Sluggaz
- Members: Treach; Vin Rock; DJ Kay Gee
- Website: naughtybynature.com

Naughty by Nature is an American hip hop group formed in East Orange, New Jersey, in 1986, consisting of Treach (born Anthony S. Criss, December 2, 1970), Vin Rock (born Vincent E. Brown, September 17, 1970), and DJ Kay Gee (born Keir Lamont Gist, September 15, 1969).

== History ==
=== 1980s ===
Treach formed Naughty by Nature with Vin Rock and DJ Kay Gee in 1986 as The New Style in East Orange, New Jersey, where they attended the same high school, East Orange Campus High School. They started to do talent shows, competing and performing in local clubs. The group first appeared on the music scene in 1989, releasing an album called Independent Leaders, and the album generated the minor hit "Scuffin' Those Knees". After the release of their first album, the group was mentored by fellow New Jersey native Queen Latifah, and subsequently changed their name. Queen Latifah introduced them to the label Tommy Boy Records and her management company.

=== 1990s ===
Naughty by Nature's first hit was "O.P.P.", which sampled the Jackson 5's hit "ABC" and was released in 1991 on their self-titled album, Naughty by Nature. The track peaked at No. 6 on the Billboard Hot 100, was named one of the top 100 rap singles of all time in 1998 by The Source magazine, and was ranked the 20th best single of the 1990s by Spin magazine. The album generated another hit with a reworking of Bob Marley's "No Woman No Cry" called "Everything's Gonna Be All Right" (the track was also called "Ghetto Bastard" on some explicit releases). That song detailed the experiences of Treach growing up in poverty, and now rising up to live a better life. Powered by the success of that song and "O.P.P.", their self-titled album went platinum.

Fellow New Jersey native Tony D accused Naughty by Nature of stealing a sample from his album Music Makes You Move and using it on "O.P.P." The matter was settled out of court. Naughty by Nature scored a hit with the track "Uptown Anthem" from the soundtrack to the 1992 film Juice, in which Treach had a cameo appearance. Treach began to pursue an acting career after befriending Tupac Shakur on the set of Juice, and Naughty by Nature appeared in the 1993 film The Meteor Man as a street gang. After Shakur's murder in 1996, Treach recorded a tribute song titled "Mourn You Til I Join You".

Later, the group had multiple hits from its third and fourth albums, 19 Naughty III and Poverty's Paradise, respectively. Both albums reached the No. 1 spot on the R&B/Hip-Hop Chart. "Hip Hop Hooray" was a success from the album 19 Naughty III. Its video was directed by Spike Lee and featured cameos by Queen Latifah, Eazy-E, Run-D.M.C., and Da Youngstas. Poverty's Paradise won the Grammy Award in 1996 for Best Rap Album, becoming the first album to win this award. It also spawned a hit song in "Feel Me Flow" which peaked at No. 17 on the Billboard Hot 100.

They produced a remix of the Michael Jackson and Janet Jackson song "Scream" in 1995.

In the mid-1990s, Naughty by Nature started their own music imprint, Illtown Records, and in 1995 released an album from their protégés the Rottin Razkals.

In 1999, the group released its fifth album, titled Nineteen Naughty Nine: Nature's Fury. The album was fairly successful, being certified Gold by the RIAA, and spawned the hit "Jamboree" that peaked at No. 10 on the Billboard Hot 100.

=== 2000–2012 ===
After the release of Nineteen Naughty Nine: Nature's Fury, a dispute regarding finances developed between Kay Gee and Treach. Treach blamed Kay Gee for squandering the group's finances. Due to these disagreements DJ Kay Gee decided to leave Naughty by Nature in late 2000. He started to develop his own record label Divine Mill. In 2001, WWE reached out to the group to record an entrance theme for Shane McMahon. The resulting song, "Here Comes The Money," has used by McMahon in WWE appearances ever since. The remainder of the group, Treach and Vin Rock, released an album in 2002 called IIcons. Due to Kay Gee's absence, the group used a variety of different producers including Da Beatminerz. The album, however, received a lukewarm reception from the public. In 2002, the group disbanded. In May 2006, Kay Gee reunited with Treach and rejoined Naughty by Nature at a concert at B.B. King's nightclub. In April 2010 they released the single "Get to Know Me Better", featuring rapper Pitbull, while the B-side of the single was called "I Gotta Lotta". Later in 2010 they released the group's first mixtape, Naughty by Nature: Tha Mixtape. In 2011 the three worked on their long-delayed seventh group album, Anthem Inc., and it came out December 13, 2011. It featured brand new material as well as re-recordings of the group's past hits.

On June 11, 2011, Naughty by Nature became the first hip-hop group to perform at Fenway Park. They performed "Hip Hop Hooray" as part of the mega boyband NKOTBSB's concert.

In March 2012, following the release of a documentary on fellow New Jersey–based hip hop group Sugar Hill Gang, Naughty by Nature performed in Asbury Park, NJ, at the Garden State film festival.

=== 2013–present: breakup and reconciliation ===
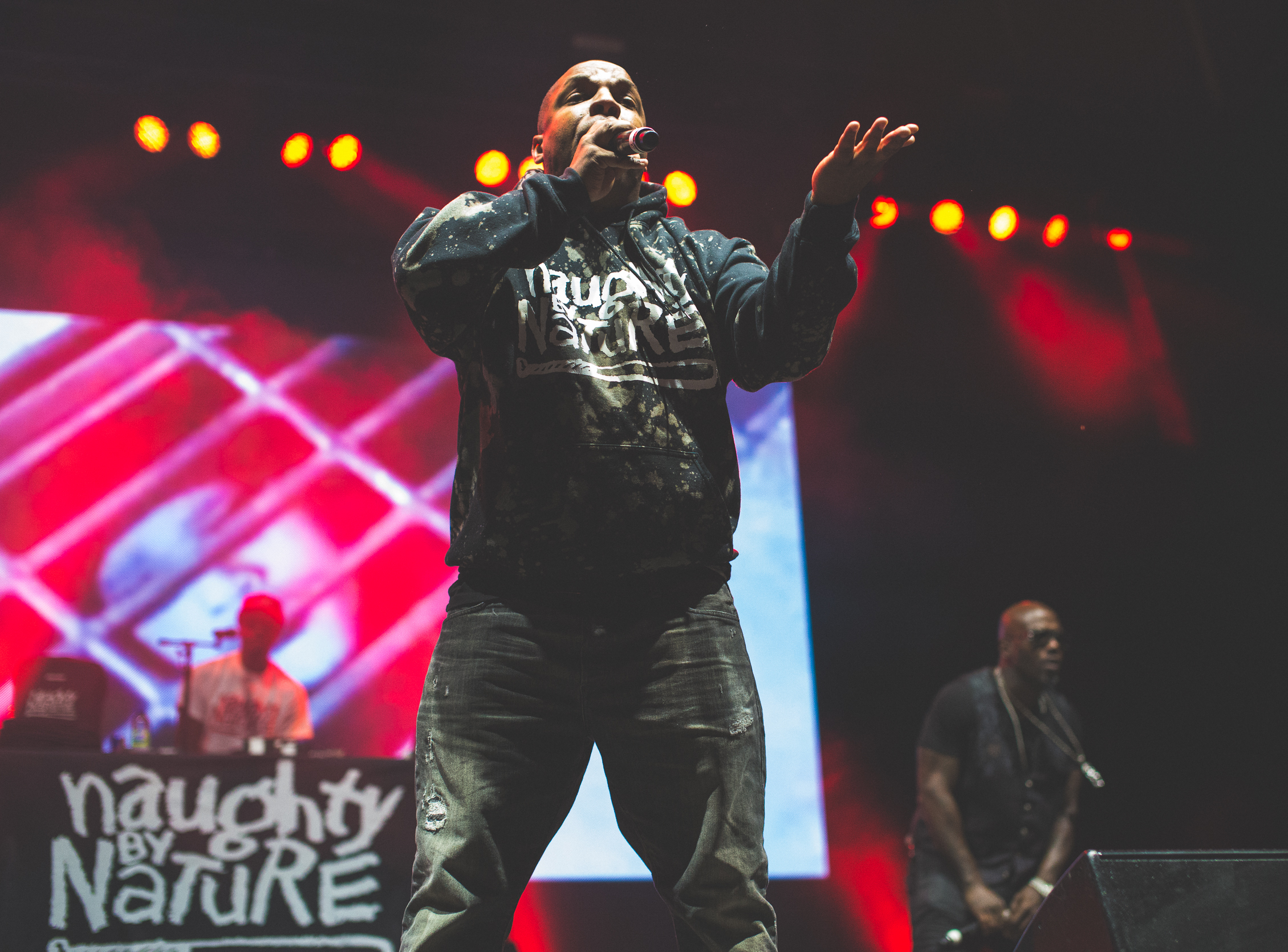
Naughty by Nature performing in 2016; Vin Rock in foreground

In May 2013, frontman Treach shocked fans when he revealed that Vin Rock had been "fired" from the group after failing to put in the same amount of energy as DJ Kay Gee and he did. At the time, Treach said he and Vinnie had not been on speaking terms for around two years.

In April 2015, Treach said he and Vinnie had resolved their issues, but now their relationship was strictly "business". "You got teammates, sometimes, that's on the same team, they may not feel each other. At the end of the day, you going out to win. That's what we doing", Treach said. Although the two were cordial, he said another Naughty by Nature album was unlikely.

In January 2016, in celebration of their 25th anniversary, Naughty by Nature posted the video for their song "God Is Us" from Anthem Inc. to their YouTube channel.

On May 2, 2019, the Mixtape Tour commenced in Cincinnati, Ohio. Performers included Naughty by Nature, Salt-N-Pepa, Debbie Gibson, and Tiffany, with New Kids on the Block being billed as the headline performers.

== Discography ==
Studio albums

- Independent Leaders (1989)
- Naughty by Nature (1991)
- 19 Naughty III (1993)
- Poverty's Paradise (1995)
- Nineteen Naughty Nine: Nature's Fury (1999)
- IIcons (2002)
- Anthem Inc. (2011)

== Awards and nominations ==
Grammy Awards

Year	Nominee / work	Award	Result	Ref.
1995	Poverty's Paradise	Grammy Award for Best Rap Album	Won	
1995	"Feel Me Flow"	Grammy Award for Best Rap Performance by a Duo or Group	Nominated	
1993	"Hip Hop Hooray"	Grammy Award for Best Rap Performance by a Duo or Group	Nominated	
1991	"O.P.P."	Grammy Award for Best Rap Performance by a Duo or Group	Nominated	

American Music Awards

Year	Artist	Award	Result
1992	Naughty by Nature	Favorite New Artist - Rap / Hip-Hop	Won
1994	Naughty by Nature	Favorite Rap/Hip-Hop Artist	Nominated
1996	Naughty by Nature	Favorite Rap/Hip-Hop Artist	Nominated

=== MTV Video Music Awards ===
Year	Nominated work	Award	Result
1993	"Hip Hop Hooray"	Best Rap Video	Nominated
