= Queen Latifah discography =

List of songs and albums from the American recording artist

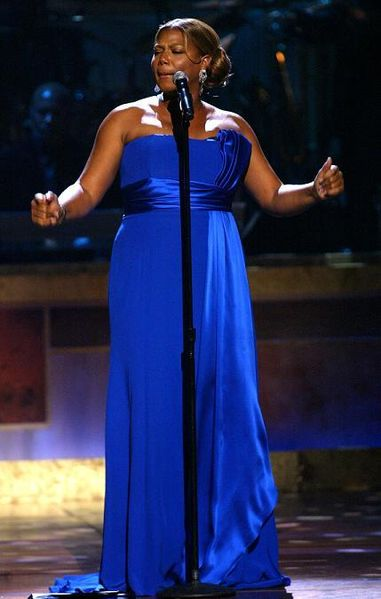
- Studio albums: 7
- Compilation albums: 3
- Singles: 23
- Music videos: 45

Queen Latifah is an American rapper, jazz/blues singer, and actress. Born Dana Owens, she has released seven studio albums, six of which were hip hop-influenced albums and two that were all-singing jazz-influenced albums. She has released a total of twenty-three singles as well. She has been given the title the "Queen of Jazz Rap".

Latifah released two albums, All Hail the Queen and Nature of a Sista', before breaking through with her 1993 album Black Reign. Black Reign received a gold certification in the United States, reaching number 60 on the Billboard 200 albums chart, and number 15 on the US R&B chart. The album has sold 491,000 copies in the United States. After a five-year hiatus, she released Order in the Court on June 16, 1998. The album was a disappointment, selling only 100,000 copies in the United States. After, Latifah released a greatest hits compilation entitled She's the Queen: A Collection of Hits.

Latifah once again found success in 2004 with her fifth studio album, The Dana Owens Album. The album was a success, charting at number 16 on the Billboard 200 albums chart. In 2007, Latifah released her sixth studio album, Trav'lin' Light through Flavor Unit/Verve Records. In 2009, Latifah released her seventh album, Persona through Flavor Unit/Universal Records.

== Albums ==
=== Studio albums ===
List of studio albums, with selected chart positions, sales figures and certifications
| Title | Album details | Peak chart positions | | | | | Sales | Certifications |
| Title | Album details | US | US R&B /HH | US Jazz | CAN | CAN R&B | Sales | Certifications |
|---|---|---|---|---|---|---|---|---|
| All Hail the Queen | Released: November 7, 1989; Label: Tommy Boy; Formats: CD, LP, cassette, digital download | 124 | 6 | — | — | — | | |
| Nature of a Sista' | Released: September 3, 1991; Label: Tommy Boy; Formats: CD, LP, cassette, digital download | 117 | 32 | — | — | — | US: 273,000 | |
| Black Reign | Released: November 16, 1993; Label: Flavor Unit, Motown; Formats: CD, LP, cassette, digital download | 60 | 15 | — | — | — | US: 491,000 | RIAA: Gold |
| Order in the Court | Released: June 16, 1998; Label: Flavor Unit, Motown; Formats: CD, digital download | 95 | 16 | — | — | — | US: 100,000 | |
| The Dana Owens Album | Released: September 28, 2004; Label: Flavor Unit, A&M, Universal, Vector; Formats: CD, LP, Cassette, digital download | 16 | 11 | — | 159 | 35 | US: 730,000 | RIAA: Gold |
| Trav'lin' Light | Released: September 25, 2007; Label: Flavor Unit, Verve; Formats: CD, LP, Cassette, digital download | 11 | 6 | 1 | — | — | US: 263,000 | |
| Persona | Released: August 25, 2009; Label: Flavor Unit/Universal; Formats: CD, digital download | 25 | 3 | — | — | — | US: 18,000 | |
"—" denotes a recording that did not chart or was not released in that territory.

=== Compilation albums ===
List of compilation albums
| Title | Album details | Sales |
|---|---|---|
| She's a Queen: A Collection of Hits | Released: December 10, 2002; Label: Flavor Unit, Motown; Formats: CD, digital download | US: 10,000 |
| 20th Century Masters – The Millennium Collection: The Best of Queen Latifah | Released: March 22, 2005; Label: Hip-O, Motown, Chronicles, UMe; Formats: CD, digital download | |
| Hip-Hop Hits | Released: May 24, 2005; Label: Flashback; Formats: CD | |

=== Group albums ===
List of group albums
| Title | Album details |
|---|---|
| The 45 King Presents The Flavor Unit (compilation – as part of Flavor Unit) | Released: July 1, 1991; Label: Tuff City; Formats: CD, LP, cassette |
| Roll wit tha Flava (compilation – as part of Flavor Unit) | Released: May 4, 1993; Label: Epic/Flavor Unit; Formats: CD, LP, cassette |
| Flavor Unit 10th Anniversary, Vol. 1 (compilation – as part of Flavor Unit) | Released: March 7, 2000; Label: Flavor Unit; Formats: CD |
| 100% Hater Proof (as part of The Unit) | Released: October 8, 2002; Label: EMI/Flavor Unit; Formats: CD |

=== Collaborative albums ===
List of collaborative albums
| Title | Album details |
|---|---|
| Queen Latifah and the Original Flavor Unit (compilation – with the Original Flavor Unit) | Released: June 18, 1996; Label: Ol' Skool Flava; Formats: CD (re-issue), LP |

== Singles ==
=== As lead artist ===
List of singles and selected chart positions, showing year released and album name
| Title | Year | Peak chart positions | | | | | | | | | | Album |
| Title | Year | US | US Dance | US R&B | US Rap | US AC | EUR | NZ | UK | UK Dance | UK R&B | Album |
|---|---|---|---|---|---|---|---|---|---|---|---|---|
| "Wrath of My Madness/Princess of the Posse" | 1988 | — | — | — | — | — | — | — | — | — | — | All Hail the Queen |
| "Dance for Me/Inside Out" | 1989 | — | — | — | 14 | — | — | — | — | — | — | All Hail the Queen |
| "Ladies First" (featuring Monie Love) | 1989 | — | 38 | 64 | 5 | — | — | — | — | — | — | All Hail the Queen |
| "Come Into My House/Ladies First" | 1990 | — | 7 | 81 | 21 | — | — | — | — | — | — | All Hail the Queen |
| "Mama Gave Birth to the Soul Children" (featuring De La Soul) | 1990 | — | 28 | — | — | — | 37 | — | 14 | — | — | All Hail the Queen |
| "Fly Girl/Nature of a Sista'" | 1991 | — | — (Note: "Fly Girl" did not enter the Dance Club Songs, but peaked at number 28 on the Dance/Electronic Singles Sales.) | 16 | 19 | — | — | 37 | 67 | — | — | Nature of a Sista |
| "Latifah's Had It Up 2 Here/That's the Way We Flow" | 1991 | — | — (Note: "Latifah's Had It Up 2 Here" did not enter the Dance Club Songs, but peaked at number 21 on the Dance/Electronic Singles Sales.) | 13 | 8 | — | — | — | — | — | — | Nature of a Sista |
| "How Do I Love Thee" | 1992 | — | 19 | 32 | — | — | — | — | — | — | | Nature of a Sista |
| "U.N.I.T.Y." | 1993 | 23 | — (Note: "U.N.I.T.Y." did not enter the Dance Club Songs, but peaked at number 1 on the Dance/Electronic Singles Sales.) | 7 | 2 | — | — | 15 | 74 | — | — | Black Reign |
| "Just Another Day..." | 1994 | 54 | — (Note: "Just Another Day..." did not enter the Dance Club Songs, but peaked at number 9 on the Dance/Electronic Singles Sales.) | 37 | 11 | — | — | — | — | — | — | Black Reign |
| "Black Hand Side" | 1994 | — | — (Note: "Black Hand Side/Weekend Love" did not enter the Dance Club Songs, but peaked at number 18 on the Dance/Electronic Singles Sales.) | 29 | 20 | — | — | — | — | — | — | Black Reign |
| "Weekend Love" | 1994 | 70 | — | 29 | — | — | — | 38 | — | — | — | Black Reign |
| "I Can't Understand" | 1994 | — | — | — | — | — | — | 38 | — | — | — | Black Reign |
| "Mr. Big Stuff" (with Shades and Free) | 1997 | — | — | — | — | — | — | — | 31 | — | — | The Associate Soundtrack |
| "It's Alright" (featuring Lil' Mo) | 1997 | 77 | — (Note: "It's Alright" did not enter the Dance Club Songs, but peaked at number 26 on the Dance/Electronic Singles Sales.) | 31 | — | — | — | — | 86 | 25 | 27 | Nothing to Lose Soundtrack / Order in the Court |
| "Bananas (Who You Gonna Call?)" (featuring Apache) | 1998 | — | — | — | 2 | — | — | — | — | — | — | Order in the Court' |
| "Paper" (featuring Pras) | 1998 | 50 | — | 23 | — | — | — | — | — | — | — | Order in the Court' |
| "Everywhere You Go" (featuring Sara Jane) (Note: "Everywhere You Go" was released as a split single with "**** What They Say" by Snoop Dogg.) | 2001 | — | — | — | — | — | — | — | — | — | — | What's the Worst That Could Happen? Soundtrack |
| "Poetry Man" | 2007 | — | — | — (Note: "Poetry Man" did not enter the Hot R&B/Hip-Hop Songs, but peaked at number 36 on the Adult R&B Airplay.) | — | 23 | — | — | — | — | — | Trav'lin' Light |
| "I'm Gonna Live Till I Die" | 2007 | — | — | — | — | — | — | — | — | — | — | Trav'lin' Light |
| "Champion" | 2008 | — | — | — | — | — | — | — | — | — | — | AT&T Team USA Soundtrack and Persona (Deluxe edition) |
| "Cue the Rain" | 2009 | — | — | — | — | — | — | — | — | — | — | Persona |
| "Walk the Dinosaur" (from Ice Age: Dawn of the Dinosaurs) | 2009 | — | — | — | — | — | — | — | — | — | — | Non-album singles |
| "The Star-Spangled Banner" | 2015 | — | — | — | — | — | — | — | — | — | — | Non-album singles |
"—" denotes a recording that did not chart or was not released in that territory.

=== As featured artist ===
List of singles as featured artist with selected chart positions, showing year released and album name
| Title | Year | Peak chart positions | | | | | | | | | | Album |
| Title | Year | US | US Dance | US R&B | US Rap | AUS | GER | IRE | NLD | NZ | UK | Album |
|---|---|---|---|---|---|---|---|---|---|---|---|---|
| "Buddy (Native Tongues Remix)" (De La Soul featuring Q-Tip, Queen Latifah, Monie Love and Jungle Brothers) | 1989 | — | 27 | 18 | 2 | — | — | — | — | — | 7 | 3 Feet High and Rising |
| "Woman for the Job" (Sly and Robbie featuring Queen Latifah) | 1989 | — | — | — | — | — | — | — | — | — | — | Silent Assassin |
| "Ndodemnyama (Free South Africa)" (as part of Hip-Hop Against Apartheid) | 1990 | — | — | — | — | — | — | — | — | — | — | Non-album single |
| "Fame '90" (David Bowie featuring Queen Latifah) | 1990 | — | 6 | — | 12 | 85 | 36 | 11 | 16 | 32 | 28 | Non-album single |
| "Find a Way" (Coldcut featuring Queen Latifah) | 1990 | — | — | — | — | — | — | — | 85 | — | 52 | Some Like It Cold |
| "Doin' Our Own Dang" (Jungle Brothers featuring A Tribe Called Quest, Queen Latifah, Monie Love & De La Soul) | 1990 | — | — | — | — | — | — | — | 40 | — | 33 | Done by the Forces of Nature |
| "Miss My Love" (Gwen Guthrie featuring Queen Latifah) | 1990 | — | 27 | — | — | — | — | — | — | — | — | Hot Times |
| "Heal Yourself" (as part of H.E.A.L. Human Education Against Lies) | 1991 | — | — | — | — | — | — | — | — | — | — | Civilization Vs. Technology |
| "For the Love of Money/Living for the City" (Troop and LeVert featuring Queen Latifah) | 1991 | — | — | 12 | — | — | — | — | — | — | — | New Jack City Soundtrack |
| "What'cha Gonna Do?" (Shabba Ranks featuring Queen Latifah) | 1992 | — | — (Note: "What'cha Gonna Do?" did not enter the Dance Club Songs, but peaked at number 9 on the Dance/Electronic Singles Sales.) | 62 | 14 | — | — | — | — | — | 21 | X-tra Naked |
| "Roll wit tha Flava" (as part of Flavor Unit MC's) | 1993 | 86 | — | 51 | 3 | — | — | — | — | — | — | Roll wit tha Flava |
| "So Tough" (Freddie Foxxx featuring Queen Latifah) | 1994 | — | — | — | 32 | — | — | — | — | — | — | Non-album singles |
| "I Can Do Too" (Cole featuring Queen Latifah) | 2000 | — | — | — | — | — | — | — | — | — | — | Non-album singles |
| "Light of a Clear Blue Morning" (Dolly Parton featuring Lainey Wilson, Queen Latifah, Miley Cyrus, and Reba McEntire) | 2026 | — | — | — | — | — | — | — | — | — (Note: "Light of a Clear Blue Morning" did not enter the NZ Top 40 Singles Chart, but peaked at number 39 on the NZ Hot Singles Sales Chart.) | — | Non-album singles |
"—" denotes a recording that did not chart or was not released in that territory.

== Other collaborations/Appearances ==
- Big Bub – "Need Your Love" with Heavy D (1997)
- Brandy – "I Wanna Be Down" (Remix) with MC Lyte and Yo-Yo (1994)
- Chaka Khan – "Pop My Clutch" (1998)
- Coldcut – "Smoke Dis One" (1990)
- Daddy-O (rapper) - "Game Recognize Game" (1995)
- Erykah Badu – "Love of My Life Worldwide" with Bahamadia and Angie Stone (2003)
- Faith Evans - Ain't Nobody (Who Could Love Me) [Puffy & Chucky Remix]" (1995)
- Living Colour – "Under Cover of Darkness" (1990)
- Luther Vandross – "Hit It Again" (2003)
- MC Lyte - "King King" (2024)
- Meredith Brooks – "Lay Down (Candles in the Rain)" (1999)
- Monifah – "Fallin in Love" (1998)
- Naughty by Nature – "Wickedest Man Alive" (1991); "Sleepin on Jersey" (1993); "Red Light" (2002); "Anthem Inc" (2011)
- Organized Noize – "Set It Off" with Andrea Martin (1996)
- Pat Benatar – "Love Is a Battlefield" (Remix) (1998)
- Queen Latifah - "Bring the Flava, La" (1993)
- Quincy Jones – "Cool Joe, Mean Joe (Killer Joe)" with Tone Loc and Nancy Wilson (1995)
- Rapsody – "Hatshepsut" (2019)
- Rod Stewart - "As Time Goes By" (2003)
- Salt N Pepa – "Friends" with Mad Lion (1997)
- Take 6 – "Harmony" (1994)
- The 45 King – "Flavor Unit Assassination Squad" with Lakim Shabazz, Apache, Double J & Lord Alibaski (1990)
- Various – "Freedom (Theme from Panther)" with TLC, Aaliyah, Zhane, SWV, MC Lyte, Mary J. Blige, En Vogue, Salt N Pepa, Billy Lawrence, N'Dea Davenport, and more (1995)
- Various – "What's Going On" (The Neptunes This One's for You Mix) with Mobb Deep, LL Cool J, Fabolous, Da Brat, N.O.R.E., Royce Da 5'9", Angie Martinez and Sonja Blade (2001)
- Zhane – "Request Line" (Remix) (1997)

In 2009, Latifah, along with the Jubilation Choir, recorded the title track on the album Oh Happy Day, covering the song the Edwin Hawkins Singers made popular in 1969.

In 2011, Latifah was featured on the track "Who Can I Turn To (When Nobody Needs Me)" on Tony Bennett's Duets II. The song won a Grammy for arrangement.

== Soundtrack album contributions ==
- New Jack City (soundtrack) (1991)
- White Men Can't Jump (1992)
- New Jersey Drive, Vol. 1 (1995)
- Sunset Park (1996)
- The Associate (1996)
- Living Out Loud (1998)
- Small Soldiers (1998)
- Chicago (2002)
- Hairspray (2007)
- Joyful Noise (2012)
- Bessie (2015)
