= She's a Queen: A Collection of Hits =

Greatest hits album by Queen Latifah
- Released: September 17, 2002 (U.S.)
- Recorded: 1987–2001
- Genre: Hip-hop
- Label: Motown/Universal records

Queen Latifah chronology
Order in the Court (1998)	She's a Queen: A Collection of Hits (2002)	The Dana Owens Album (2004)

Professional ratings
Review scores
Source	Rating
Allmusic	4.5/5 stars

She's a Queen: A Collection of Hits is the first greatest hits collection album by the American hip-hop artist, Queen Latifah. The album was released on September 17, 2002, in the United States. Although the album was released on Motown Records, a few of Latifah's songs from Tommy Boy Records were included on it. The album also includes two newly recorded songs from Latifah, including "Go Head" and "She's a Queen".

== Track listing ==
No.	Title	Original album	Length
1.	"Ladies First" (featuring Monie Love)	All Hail the Queen	3:54
2.	"She's a Queen" (featuring Tha' Rayne)	–	4:44
3.	"Winki's Theme"	Black Reign	5:31
4.	"Latifah's Had It Up 2 Here"	Nature of a Sista'	4:26
5.	"U.N.I.T.Y."	Black Reign	4:11
6.	"Black Hand Side"	Black Reign	3:22
7.	"Go Head"	–	4:41
8.	"Just Another Day..."	Black Reign	4:28
9.	"Set It Off" (Organized Noize featuring Queen Latifah)	Set It Off soundtrack	5:01
10.	"Paper"	Order in the Court	4:03
11.	"It's Alright"	Order in the Court	3:47
12.	"Come into My House"	All Hail the Queen	4:13

== Censorship ==
Every song included on the album that contains profanity is edited. Instead of having the profane word removed completely from the song, the word is played backwards on the track.
