= Love Conquers All (album) =

1982 studio album by Michael Wycoff

Studio album by Michael Wycoff
- Released: 1982
- Recorded: 1982
- Studios: Redwing Studios, Tarzana, California; Golden Sound Studios, Hollywood; Hollywood Sound Recorders, Hollywood
- Genres: Soul; Funk
- Length: 38:11
- Label: RCA
- Producer: Webster Lewis

Michael Wycoff chronology
Come to My World (1981)	Love Conquers All (1982)	On the Line (1983)

Love Conquers All is the second album by Los Angeles, California soul singer Michael Wycoff, released in 1982.

The album peaked at No. 54 on Billboard's Top Soul Albums. "Still Got the Magic" and "Looking Up to You" are minor hits on the Hot Black Singles chart. "Looking Up to You" is sampled on Zhané's 1994 hit song "Hey Mr. D.J.".

Professional ratings
Review scores
Source	Rating
Allmusic	3.5/5 stars

== Track listing ==
No.	Title	Writer(s)	Length
1.	"Still Got The Magic (Sweet Delight)"	Denzil Miller, Monica Pege, Arnold Ramsey	5:49
2.	"Looking Up To You"	Zane Grey, Leon Ware	5:27
3.	"Love Is So Easy"	Webster Lewis	5:15
4.	"Can We Be Friends" (Duet with Evelyn "Champagne" King)	Billy Osborne	3:38
5.	"Diamond Real"	David Paul Bryant, Janice M. Johnson, Al McKay	3:47
6.	"Love Conquers All"	James Gadson, Denzil Miller, Monica Pege	5:04
7.	"Take This Chance Again"	Webster Lewis	4:36
8.	"It's Over"	Tony Green	4:35
Total length:			38:11

== Personnel ==
- Michael Wycoff – lead and backing vocals, keyboards
- Webster Lewis – keyboards
- Al McKay, David T. Walker, Charles Bynum – guitar
- Nathan Watts, Eddie N. Watkins Jr. – bass
- James Gadson – drums
- Fred Wesley, George Bohanon – trombone
- Ray Brown, John Roberts, Nolan Smith – trumpet
- Ronald Brown, Jeff Clayton, Ernie Fields – woodwind
- Bob Watts – French horn
- Janice Gower – concertmaster
- New Paradise – backing vocals
- H.B. Barnum, Webster Lewis – string arrangements
- Ernie Fields, James Gadson, Webster Lewis – horn arrangements
- James Gadson, Michael Wycoff, Monica Pege, Webster Lewis – vocal arrangements

Technical

- Bob Hughes, Kirk Butler, Steve Macmillan - engineer
- Scott Hensel - photography

== Charts ==
Album

Chart (1982)	Peak position
Billboard Top Soul Albums	54

Singles

Year	Single	Chart	Position
1982	"Still Got the Magic"	US Billboard Hot Black Singles	64
1982	"Still Got the Magic"	US Billboard Dance Club Songs	37
1982	"Looking Up to You"	US Billboard Hot Black Singles	47
