= On the Line (Michael Wycoff album) =

1983 studio album by Michael Wycoff

Studio album by Michael Wycoff
- Released: 1983
- Recorded: 1983
- Studio: Hollywood Sound, Hollywood, California
- Genre: Soul; Funk
- Length: 38:11
- Label: RCA
- Producer: Webster Lewis

Michael Wycoff chronology
Love Conquers All (1982)	On the Line (1983)

Professional ratings
Review scores
Source	Rating
Allmusic	3/5 stars

On the Line is the third and final album by American soul singer Michael Wycoff.

== Track listing ==
No.	Title	Writer(s)	Length
1.	"On the Line"	Gary Taylor	5:50
2.	"There's No Easy Way"	Lol Mason, Richard Jon Smith	4:11
3.	"You've Got It Coming"	Harold Johnson	3:50
4.	"So Close"	Arthur Hamilton, Webster Lewis	6:06
5.	"Tell Me Love"	Webster Lewis, Robert Wright	7:48
6.	"I'll Do Anything for You"	Leo Nocentelli	4:08
7.	"Do It to Me Baby"	Gary Taylor	3:40
8.	"You Are Everything"	Linda Creed, Thom Bell	3:53
Total length:			38:11

== Personnel ==
- Michael Wycoff – lead and backing vocals, keyboards, piano, synthesizer
- Webster Lewis – keyboards, piano, synthesizer, backing vocals, arrangements
- Leo Nocentelli, Miles Joseph – guitar
- Denzil Miller – synthesizer
- James Gadson – drums, backing vocals, assistant producer
- David Shields, Nathan Watts – bass
- Eddie "Bongo" Brown – percussion
- Dorothy Ashby – harp
- Anthony Wells (track: A1), Brenda White King (track: B1), Cheryl James, Delores Sanders, Fonzi Thornton (track: B1), Kathy Thompson, Lynn Rochelle, Michelle Cobbs (tracks: B1), Phillip Ballou (tracks: B1), Robert Wright – backing vocals
- H.B. Barnum (tracks: A1, A4), Webster Lewis – string arrangements

Technical

- James Gadson - assistant producer
- Robert Wright - co-producer on "On the Line" and "Tell Me Love"
- Nick Sangiamo - photography

== Charts ==
=== Singles ===
Year	Single	Chart positions
Year	Single	US R&B
1983	"Tell Me Love"	23
1983	"There's No Easy Way"	83
