= Pronounced Jah-Nay =

Studio album by Zhané
- Released: February 15, 1994
- Recorded: 1993
- Studio: Enterprise (Burbank, California); Encore Studios (Burbank, California); Marion Recording Studio (Fairview, New Jersey); Unique Recording Studios (New York City, New York; Soundtrack Studios (New York City, New York)
- Genre: R&B
- Length: 56:34
- Label: Motown
- Producer: Naughty by Nature; Zhané

Zhané chronology
Pronounced Jah-Nay (1994)	Saturday Night (1997)

Singles from Pronounced Jah-Nay
- 1. "Hey Mr. D.J." Released: August 12, 1993; 2. "Groove Thang" Released: January 1994; 3. "Sending My Love" Released: May 23, 1994; 4. "Vibe" Released: August 30, 1994; 5. "You're Sorry Now" Released: September 27, 1994

Pronounced Jah-Nay is the debut studio album by American R&B group Zhané. It was released on February 15, 1994, via Motown. The recording sessions took place at The Enterprise Studios and at Encore Studios in Burbank, at Marion Recording Studio in Fairview, New Jersey, and at Unique Recording Studios and at Soundtrack Studios in New York City. The album was produced by Naughty by Nature and Zhané. It peaked at number thirty-seven on the US Billboard 200 and number eight on the Top R&B Albums chart. It was certified platinum by the Recording Industry Association of America on October 4, 1996.

The album produced five singles: "Hey Mr. D.J.", "Groove Thang", "Sending My Love", "Vibe" and "You're Sorry Now". Its lead single, "Hey Mr. D.J.", became the group's most successful song, reaching number six on the Billboard Hot 100 and receiving gold certification by the RIAA.

== Critical reception ==
Professional ratings
Review scores
Source	Rating
AllMusic	4/5 stars
The Baltimore Sun	(favorable)
Billboard	(favorable)
The Encyclopedia of Popular Music	3/5 stars
Entertainment Weekly	A−
Gavin Report	(favorable)
Music Week	3/5 stars
People	(favorable)
Spin	(favorable)

The album received positive reviews from music critics. American magazine Billboard wrote, "Silky production work provides a tailored backdrop for artists' harmonic vocals, resulting in relaxing ballads and memorable mid-tempo pleasures. Credit Naughty by Nature's Kay Gee with not overproducing project and allowing the twosome's emotions to ring true." Pan-European magazine Music & Media commented, "The concept this female duo–Renee Neufville and Jean Norris–practises is relatively new. Blending sweet soul music with hip hop rhythm tracks, the outcome is not unlike 'Sons Of Soul' Tony! Toni! Tone!. Compared to their own streetwise rap records, producers Naughty by Nature were very smooth operators in the studio for this one. Apart from the two singles 'Hey Mr. D.J.' and 'Groove Thang' the beat is rather slow. Pronounce "Ge-nius," we say sans gene." Alan Jones from Music Week gave the album three out of five, saying, "Zhane are best known for their two dance hits [...] so it comes as something of a surprise that nearly all of the rest of this album is superior soul of the late night listening variety."

== Track listing ==
No.	Title	Writer(s)	Producer(s)	Length
1.	"Hey Mr. D.J."	Renée Neufville; Keir Gist; Leon Ware; Zane Grey	Naughty by Nature	4:11
2.	"Intro (Interlude)"	Gist	Naughty by Nature	0:35
3.	"Vibe"	Neufville; Naughty by Nature; Rod Temperton	Naughty by Nature	3:30
4.	"Sending My Love"	Neufville; Naughty by Nature	Naughty by Nature; David Bellochio (add.)	3:41
5.	"Sweet Taste of Love"	Neufville	Naughty by Nature; David Bellochio (add.)	3:50
6.	"Changes"	Neufville	Naughty by Nature; Renée Neufville; Craig King (co.)	4:44
7.	"You're Sorry Now"	Neufville; Naughty by Nature	Naughty by Nature; David Bellochio (co.)	4:41
8.	"Love Me Today"	Neufville	Renée Neufville; Naughty by Nature	5:25
9.	"Off My Mind"	Neufville	Renée Neufville	4:24
10.	"La, La, La"	Neufville; Jean Norris	Jean Norris; Naughty by Nature	5:29
11.	"Groove Thang"	Neufville; Naughty by Nature; Patrice Rushen; Charles Mims, Jr.; Sheree Brown; Freddie D. Washington	Naughty by Nature	3:55
12.	"For a Reason"	Norris	Zhané	6:56
13.	"Hey Mr. D.J. (Remix)"	Neufville; Gist; Ware; Grey	Naughty by Nature	5:13
Total length:				56:34

Sample credits

- Track 1 contains a sample from "Lookin' Up to You" performed by Michael Wycoff
- Track 3 contains a sample from "Love X Love" performed by George Benson

== Personnel ==
- Renée Neufville – vocals, lyrics (tracks: 1, 3–11, 13), piano (track 8), strings (track 12), producer (tracks: 6, 8, 9, 12), executive producer
- Jean Norris – vocals, lyrics & producer (tracks: 10, 12), keyboards (track 10), piano (track 12), executive producer
- Keir "Kay Gee" Gist – vocals (track 2), drum programming (tracks: 6–8, 10, 13), executive producer
- Wendell & Face – vocals (track 2)
- Les – additional vocals (track 3)
- Voe Harris – keyboards (track 3)
- Naheem "Pop Holiday" Bowens – keyboards (track 3)
- David Bellochio – keyboards (tracks: 4, 5, 7, 8), piano (track 9), additional producer (tracks: 4, 5), co-producer (track 7), recording (tracks: 1–8, 10–13)
- Alan Goldsher – bass (track 9)
- Steve Williams – drums (track 9)
- Frank Gravis – bass (track 10)
- Paul Levant – guitar (track 10)
- Kevin Batchelor – trumpet (track 10)
- Naughty by Nature – producers (tracks: 1–8, 10, 11, 13)
- Craig King – co-producer (track 6)
- Angela Piva – recording (tracks: 1–8, 10–14), mixing (tracks: 1–7, 9–14)
- John Van Nest – mixing (track 8)
- Frank Fagnano – recording (track 9)
- Quincy Jones III – remixing (track 13)
- Ed Miller – recording assistant
- Fred Kelly – recording assistant
- John Buttigieg – recording assistant
- Mufi – recording assistant
- Rob Polhemus – recording assistant
- Scott Blockland – recording assistant
- Scott Canto – recording assistant
- Steve McKeever – executive producer, liner notes
- Jonathan Clark – art direction
- Shauna Woods – design
- James Minchin III – photography

== Charts ==
=== Weekly charts ===
Chart (1994)	Peak position
Australian Albums (ARIA)	50
UK Albums (OCC)	89
US Billboard 200	37
US Top R&B Albums (Billboard)	8

=== Year-end charts ===
Chart (1994)	Position
US Top R&B/Hip-Hop Albums (Billboard)	31

=== Singles ===
Year	Single	Peak chart positions					
Year	Single	U.S. Billboard Hot 100	U.S. Dance Music/Club Play Singles	U.S. Hot Dance Music/Maxi-Singles Sales	U.S. Hot R&B/Hip-Hop Singles & Tracks	U.S. Rhythmic Top 40	U.S. Top 40 Mainstream
1993	"Hey Mr. D.J."	6	2	1	3	2	16
1994	"Groove Thang"	17	13	1	2	4	33
1994	"Sending My Love"	40	—	16	5	26	—
1994	"Vibe"	119	—	14	33	—	—
1995	"You're Sorry Now"	—	—	—	38	—	—
"—" denotes releases that did not chart.

== Certifications ==
Region	Certification	Certified units/sales
United States (RIAA)	Platinum	1,000,000^{^}
^{^} Shipments figures based on certification alone.
