= Bananas (Who You Gonna Call?) =

Single by Queen Latifah

from the album Order in the Court
- Released: April 14, 1998
- Recorded: 1997
- Genre: Rap
- Label: Motown
- Songwriter(s): Queen Latifah, Crapps, Peaks, Siskind
- Producer(s): Queen Latifah, Lancelot H. Owens

Queen Latifah singles chronology
| "It's Alright" (1997) | "Bananas (Who You Gonna Call?)" (1998) | "Paper" (1998) |

"Bananas (Who You Gonna Call?)" is the first single from Queen Latifah's fourth studio album, Order in the Court (1998). The track features New Jersey rapper Apache, a member of Latifah's Flavor Unit, as well as DJ Butta Fingers. The song samples the Fugees "Fu-Gee-La". and was recorded at Soundtrack Studios and Chung King Studios in New York City.

== Music videos ==
Two music videos were claimed to have been produced for this song.

== Reception ==
In his 1998 review in Billboard magazine, critic Larry Flick said that Queen Latifah "comes out swingin', firing off rhymes with a dexterity befitting her experience". In 2023, Vincent Anthony wrote in The 97 magazine that Queen Latifah "breathes fire on 'Bananas' alongside the late Flava Unit M.C. Apache.
