= Apache Ain't Shit =

Studio album by Apache
- Released: February 9, 1993
- Studios: Unique (New York, NY)
- Genre: Hip hop
- Length: 45:36
- Labels: Tommy Boy; Warner Bros.
- Producers: Apache; Diamond D; Double J; Large Professor; Q-Tip; S.I.D. Reynolds; the 45 King

Singles from Apache Ain't Shit
- 1. "Gangsta Bitch" Released: February 26, 1993

Apache Ain't Shit is the only studio album by American rapper Apache. It was released in 1993 via Tommy Boy/Warner Bros. Records. The recording sessions took place at Unique Recording Studios in New York. The album was produced by Apache, S.I.D. Reynolds, Double J, Diamond D, Large Professor, Q-Tip, the 45 King, with Benny Medina, Queen Latifah, and Sha-Kim serving as executive producers. It features guest appearances from Nikki D, Cee, Collie Weed, Cut Monitor Milo, Double J, Latee, the Jigaboos, the My Dick Posse, Treach, and Vin Rock.

The album peaked at number 69 on the Billboard 200 and number 15 on the Top R&B/Hip-Hop Albums. One charting single was released from the album, the Q-Tip-produced hit "Gangsta Bitch", which made it to No. 67 on the Billboard Hot 100, No. 49 on the Hot R&B/Hip-Hop Singles & Tracks and No. 11 on the Hot Rap Singles. Another single titled "Do fa Self" was also released, but it did not chart.

== Critical reception ==
Professional ratings
Review scores
Source	Rating
AllMusic	2.5/5 stars
Entertainment Weekly	B+
RapReviews	7/10
The Source	4/5 stars
The Village Voice	(dud)

Pulse! noted that "Gangsta Bitch" combined "the exuberance and humor of Heavy D with the rough-edged ghetto vibe of Naughty by Nature."

While noting that the lyrics may have been humor not intended to be taken seriously, AllMusic still criticized the album's racist anti-white themes, such as those in the song "Kill D'White People".

== Track listing ==
No.	Title	Writer(s)	Producer(s)	Length
1.	"The Beginning"	Anthony Peaks	S.I.D. Reynolds; Apache	1:20
2.	"Tonto" (featuring Nikki D)	Peaks	Double J	4:16
3.	"Do fa Self"	Peaks	The 45 King	3:19
4.	"Gangsta Bitch"	Peaks; Jonathan Davis	Q-Tip	4:45
5.	"A Fight"	Peaks	S.I.D. Reynolds	3:31
6.	"Kill D'White People"	Peaks	Double J	0:17
7.	"Hey Girl" (featuring Cut Monitor Milo and Collie Weed)	Peaks; Sheldon Scott; Garfield Mitchell; Joseph Modeliste; Arthur Neville; George Porter Jr.; Leo Nocentelli	Large Professor	3:38
8.	"Apache Ain't Shit"	Peaks	S.I.D. Reynolds	3:40
9.	"Blunted Snap Session" (featuring the Jigaboos and the My Dick Posse)	Peaks	S.I.D. Reynolds	2:43
10.	"Who Freaked Who" (featuring Nikki D)	Peaks	Diamond D	3:42
11.	"Get Ya Weight Up"	Peaks	Diamond D	3:55
12.	"Woodchuck" (featuring Latee, Cee, Double J, Vin Rock and Treach)	Peaks	Apache	4:23
13.	"Make Money"	Peaks	Double J	3:01
14.	"Wayz of a Murderahh"	Peaks; Darryl French; Curtis Mayfield	S.I.D. Reynolds	3:16
Total length:				45:36

Sample credits

- Track 4 contains a sample of "Love and Happiness", performed by Monty Alexander
- Track 7 contains a sample of "Britches", performed by the Meters
- Track 10 contains a sample of "Who's Gonna Take the Weight", performed by Kool & the Gang
- Track 14 contains a sample of "Stone Junkies", performed by Curtis Mayfield

== Charts ==
Chart (1993)	Peak position
US Billboard 200	69
US Top R&B/Hip-Hop Albums (Billboard)	15
