= Vibe (Zhané song) =

1994 single by Zhané

Single by Zhané

from the album Pronounced Jah-Nay
- Released: August 8, 1994
- Length: 3:30
- Label: Motown
- Songwriters: Naughty by Nature; Renee Neufville; Rod Temperton
- Producer: Naughty by Nature

Zhané singles chronology
"Sending My Love" (1994)	"Vibe" (1994)	"Shame" (1996)

"Vibe" is a song by American R&B group Zhané, released on August 8, 1994 by Motown as the fourth single recorded for their debut album, Pronounced Jah-Nay (1994). It was co-written by group member Renee Neufville with its producer Naughty by Nature and samples George Benson's 1980 single "Love X Love".

== Critical reception ==
J.D. Considine from The Baltimore Sun named the song a "sturdy, bass-thumping number". Pan-European magazine Music & Media wrote, "Hey Mr. DJ get into the vibe of the most attractive new jill swing duo, pronounced "Jah-Nay". Extra swing is added by a sample from George Benson's jazz guitar lick on 'Love X Love'." PD Jon Kristiansen by Danish radio station VLRNejle said, "It's music in today's vibe. If DJs are aware of it, it could become a major hit."

== Music video ==
The accompanying music video for "Vibe" was directed by Qick On The Draw's Cameron Casey and filmed in San Francisco. George Young and Nicole Hirsch produced it.

== Track listings ==
- 12-inch, vinyl
1. "Vibe" (LP version) – 3:30
2. "Vibe" (instrumental) – 3:27
3. "Vibe" (a capella) – 3:33
4. "Vibe" (LP version) – 3:31
5. "Vibe" (instrumental) – 3:27
6. "Vibe" (a capella) – 3:33
- CD, maxi-single
1. "Vibe" (original album version) – 3:30
2. "Vibe" (Maurice's Clubvibe mix) – 6:35
3. "Vibe" (UBQ's Vibeunder mix) – 6:40
4. "Vibe" (Georgie's Feelthevibe mix) – 5:42
- "Vibe" remixes (12-inch, vinyl)
1. "Vibe" (Groove Theory mix) – 3:51
2. "Vibe" (Reel Swinga mix) – 3:34
3. "Vibe" (Maurice's club edit) – 3:52
4. "Vibe" (LP version) – 3:30
5. "Vibe" (Reel Swinga instrumental) – 3:30
- "Vibe" remixes (CD, maxi-single)
1. "Vibe" (Sweets Illmatic mix w/o rap) – 4:12
2. "Vibe" (Sweets Illmatic mix w/ rap) – 4:12
3. "Vibe" (Sweets Illmatic instrumental) – 4:11
4. "Vibe" (LP version) – 3:30

== Personnel ==
- Executive production – Kay Gee, Steve McKeever, Zhané
- Music – Naughty by Nature, Renée Neufville, Rod Temperton
- Production – Naughty by Nature
- Writing – Renée Neufville

== Charts ==
Chart (1994)	Peak position
Australia (ARIA)	142
UK Singles (OCC)	67
UK Dance (OCC)	11
UK Dance (Music Week)	11
UK Club Chart (Music Week)	29
US Dance Singles Sales (Billboard)	14
US Hot R&B/Hip-Hop Songs (Billboard)	33
