= Order in the Court =

Studio album by Queen Latifah
- Released: June 16, 1998
- Recorded: 1997–1998
- Genre: Hip-hop
- Length: 55:17
- Labels: Flavor Unit; Motown
- Producers: Marcus "DL" Siskind; Big Jaz; Clark Kent; Chad "Dr. Ceuss" Elliott; Kay Gee; Pras; Jerry Wonda; Queen Latifah; Divine Styler; Martin "Kendu" Issacs; Darryl "Big Baby" McClary; Mike "Suga" Allen; Diamond D

Queen Latifah chronology
Black Reign (1993)	Order in the Court (1998)	She's a Queen: A Collection of Hits (2002)

Singles from Order in the Court
- 1. "It's Alright" Released: June 28, 1997; 2. "Bananas (Who You Gonna Call?)" Released: April 14, 1998; 3. "Paper" Released: May 5, 1998

Professional ratings
Review scores
Source	Rating
AllMusic	3/5 stars
Entertainment Weekly	A−
Rolling Stone	3/5 stars
The Source	3.5/5 stars
The Village Voice	B+

Order in the Court is the fourth studio album by the American hip-hop artist and actress Queen Latifah. The album was released on June 16, 1998, by Motown Records and would be Latifah's last album with Motown. It is partly dedicated to the Notorious B.I.G. and Tupac Shakur. It is her first album to have the Parental Advisory warning on it.

Before the album's release, Latifah and Foxy Brown had been arguing over who was the real Queen. On the album's second track, "Court Is In Session" Latifah portrayed herself as a judge presiding over the current state of hip-hop music by taunting her rivals, including Foxy. However, with the closing track, "Life", Latifah comes to realize that feuding with other female rappers was futile, given the untimely and recent deaths of Biggie and Tupac. Both "Black On Black Love" and "Life" celebrate the black community, black love, and black businesses.

More so than Latifah's other hip-hop albums, this one focuses on her legacy and attempts to cement herself as a defining hip-hop artist, regardless of gender.

== Track listing ==
1. "Bananas (Who You Gonna Call?)" (featuring Apache) – 4:00
2. "Court Is In Session" – 3:52
3. "No/Yes" (skit) – 0:45
4. "No/Yes" – 4:50
5. "Turn You On" – 4:21
6. "Black on Black Love" (featuring Antonique Smith and Next) – 5:05
7. "Parlay" (featuring Le Fem Markita) – 4:52
8. "Paper" – 4:00
9. "What Ya Gonna Do" (featuring Inaya Jafan) – 4:33
10. "It's Alright" (featuring Faith Evans, Lil' Mo) – 3:45
11. "Phone Call (Skit)" – 0:34
12. "Brownsville" (featuring Le Fem Markita, Scarlet and Nikki D) – 4:40
13. "I Don't Know" (featuring Sisqó) – 4:29
14. "Life" – 5:42

=== European edition ===
15. "Let Her Live" (featuring Next)

=== Japanese edition ===
15. "Let Her Live" (featuring Next)
16. "Keep Your Head to the Sky"

== Album notes ==
- Singer Inaya Day is featured on the album, credited as Inaya Jafan
- Latifah performed the track "Life" at the Lilith Fair in 1998. The live song also appears on the CD and cassette release Lilith Fair Volume 2
- "Turn You On" samples and interpolates "I Didn't Mean to Turn You On" by Cherelle
- "Let Her Live" samples and interpolates "That Girl" by Stevie Wonder
- "Keep Your Head to the Sky" samples and interpolates "Saturday Love" by Cherrelle and Alexander O'Neal
- "Life" Samples "You're Not the Man" by Sade
- "Paper" interpolates "I Heard It Through the Grapevine" by Marvin Gaye
- "Black on Black Love" samples "Make Me Say It Again, Girl" by the Isley Brothers
- "Court Is in Session" samples "What Am I Missing" by Rufus & Chaka Khan
- "Bananas (Who You Gonna Call)" samples vocals from "Fu-Gee-La" by the Fugees
- "It's Alright" samples "I Want to Thank You" by Alicia Myers
