= Chill Rob G =

American rapper (born 1964)

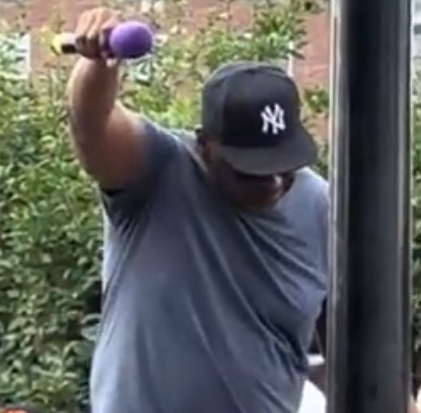
- Chill Rob G performing in 2023

Background information
- Born: Robert Frazier; May 15, 1964 (age 62)
- Origin: Jersey City, New Jersey, US
- Genres: Hip hop
- Occupation: Rapper
- Instrument: Vocals
- Member of: Flavor Unit

Robert Frazier (born May 15, 1964), known professionally as Chill Rob G, is an American rapper from Jersey City, New Jersey.

== Career ==
Chill Rob G's first hip hop collaboration was being part of the original version of the Flavor Unit collective, which included Lakim Shabazz, The 45 King, and Queen Latifah, among others. He signed with Stu Fine's Wild Pitch Records in 1987, and released one album, Ride the Rhythm, on the label. Ride the Rhythm's tracks alternated between a somewhat hardcore sound and an easygoing, conversational tone. It was chosen by The Source as one of the 100 Greatest Rap Albums.

In 1989, his Song "Let the words flow" was copied illegally and without permission by the German pop-dance group Snap! on their hit record "The Power". The song was a remix created by German producers Michael Münzing and Luca Anzilotti (under the pseudonyms Benito Benites and John "Virgo" Garrett III.) After the song gained in popularity in Europe, and Arista/BMG records came calling (via Ariola/BMG, the group's label in its home country), Münzing and Anzilotti recruited Durron Butler (aka Turbo B) to record a new version of the song, rather than continue lip-syncing the original Chill Rob G lyrics. It was this version that was ultimately used and promoted as Snap!'s official version.

Chill Rob G virtually disappeared from the hip hop scene for the next decade. He stated in an interview that it was primarily stress within his personal life (and hints at frustration with his label, Wild Pitch) that caused his recession into obscurity at the peak of his career.

He recorded a second album, Black Gold, on independent label Echo International. A deal with the record company was not reached and the album remained unreleased for years before appearing on iTunes on May 6, 2008.

In 1996, his track "Bad Dreams" was covered by the British trip hop artist Tricky on his album Pre-Millennium Tension.

In 2002, he appeared on DSP's album In the Red. He also recorded a song with R.A. the Rugged Man Treach of Naughty by Nature, and Chuck D of Public Enemy. He has been active intermittently in the years since, working with producers such as Skamadix, C Doc and the 45 King. He is at work on several projects.

== Discography ==
Albums

- Ride the Rhythm (1989) Wild Pitch Records
- Black Gold (2000/2008) Echo-Fuego Music Group
- Empires Crumble (2022) The SpitSLAM Record Label Group
- Survival of the Better (2026) The SpitSLAM Record Label Group

Singles

- "Dope Rhymes" (1988) Wild Pitch/EMI Records
- "Court Is Now in Session" (1988) Wild Pitch/EMI Records
- "The Power" (1989) Bellaphon Records
- "Let Me Show You" / "Make It" (1990) Wild Pitch/EMI Records
- "Let Me Know Something" (1996) Echo International Records
- "Look Out Below" / "Higher" (1997) Truly Hype Recordings
- "Whatever" (1999) Echo International
- "Chilled Not Frozen" (2015) Nobody Buys Records
