= Nathan Watts =

American musician

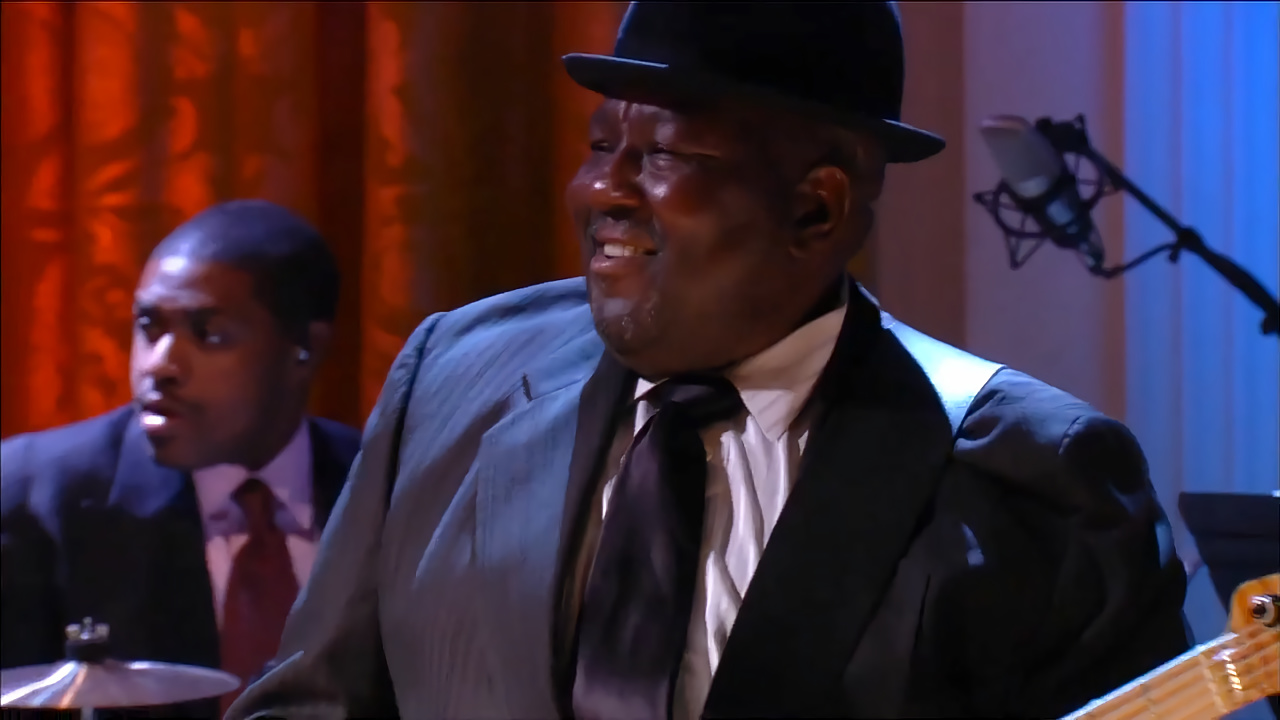
- Nathan Watts performing at the White House (2009).

Background information
- Born: Nathan Lamar Watts; March 25, 1954 (age 72); Detroit, Michigan, US
- Genres: Funk, soul, R&B, rock and roll
- Occupations: Musician, musical director
- Instruments: Bass, keyboards

Nathan Lamar Watts (born March 25, 1954, in Detroit, Michigan.) is an American session bassist, best known for his work with Stevie Wonder from the 1970s to the present. He has served as Stevie Wonder's musical director since 1994.

== Biography ==
Born in Detroit, Nathan Watts started playing the trumpet while he was still in elementary school, inspired by Lee Morgan. Watts was part of a trio that featured other future prominent session musicians Ray Parker Jr. on clarinet and drummer Ollie Brown and frequented Motown's Hitsville Studios to attend rehearsals and recordings of The Funk Brothers, the base-band of the label. When Parker abandoned the clarinet in favor of the guitar, he convinced Watts to switch to bass, which was the first thing that he did after graduating from high school in 1972. With his first instrument, a National Bass, Watts learned "Cold Sweat" by James Brown, and soon began to study the lines of other great bassists such as James Jamerson, Chuck Rainey, and Bob Babbitt. When Ray Parker Jr. joined Marvin Gaye's band, Watts joined a local group called the Final Decision, with the intention of studying accounting, if his career as a musician failed.

In August 1974, Watts received a call to work with Stevie Wonder, in replacement of Reggie McBride, who had joined Rare Earth. At the time, Watts had only been playing bass for two years. After being selected as the official bassist of the band, Watts took part in the Japanese tour of 1975, and then began recording the album Songs in the Key of Life. Watts says throughout his career with Wonder that he recorded bass tracks on many demos that Wonder replaced with his own keyboard bass for the final versions. This method was employed for “Knocks Me Off My Feet″ and ″Isn't She Lovely″. From that moment on, Nathan Watts's career has continued to develop, both alongside Stevie Wonder and with many other artists.

== Style and valuation ==
Nathan Watts grew up listening to the Funk Brothers as well as other musicians such as Jimi Hendrix, Deep Purple, Rare Earth, Mahogany Rush, and Steppenwolf. In terms of his three main influences as a bassist, Watts lists James Jamerson, Chuck Rainey and Joseph "Lucky" Scott, bassist of Curtis Mayfield.

Technically, his style is characterized by the use of three fingers of the right hand, the strong attack that prints the notes, as well as the frequent use of techniques of palm mute, hammer on, trills and slides. Watts has developed an important career along with Stevie Wonder, with whom he has recorded some songs that would become classics for lovers: "I Wish", "As", "I Ain't Gonna Stand for It" and "Do I Do" are among Watts' top favorite bass lines. More than 36 years in the service of Stevie Wonder – along with being the musical director of the band since 1994 – he earned in 2010 the International Bassist Award from the Winter NAMM Show, an award that recognizes the achievements of the musician throughout his career.

== Gear ==
Nathan Watts has used his 1974 Fender Precision Bass and his 1979 Music Man StingRay as main instruments throughout his career. He has also used a Fender Jazz Bass and Yamaha, Aria, and B.C. Rich (four and five string) bass and Roland G-88. On the road he currently utilizes Bossa basses (custom made red, black, and green 5 strings and 4 string blue) for a modern tone. In the studio he uses Alleva-Coppolo basses (a LG-5 Classic Crewes of five strings with and without frets). He also uses Elixir Nanowebs, and Hartke Hydrive amplifiers and LH1000 heads. Before he became an endorser for Hartke, he had previously used a National amplifier and SWR amplifiers.

== Discography ==
=== With Stevie Wonder ===
- 1976 – Songs in the Key of Life
- 1979 – Journey Through The Secret Life Of Plants
- 1980 – Hotter Than July
- 1982 – Original Musiquarium I
- 1984 – The Woman in Red
- 1987 – Characters
- 1991 – Jungle Fever
- 1995 – Conversation Peace
- 1995 – Natural Wonder
- 2005 – A Time To Love

=== Other artists ===
- 1977 – Funk in a Mason Jar – Harvey Mason
- 1977 – Sergio Mendes & the New Brasil '77 – Sergio Mendes
- 1977 – Song Bird – Denice Williams
- 1977 – The Two of Us – Marilyn McCoo & Billy Davis Jr.
- 1977 – Choosing You – Lenny Williams
- 1978 – Bish – Stephen Bishop
- 1978 – Destiny – The Jacksons
- 1978 – Live and Direct – The Mighty Clouds of Joy
- 1978 – Love-A-Thon – Vernon Burch
- 1978 – Spark of Love – Lenny Williams
- 1978 – Brasil '88 – Sergio Mendes
- 1979 – Bittersweet – Lamont Dozier
- 1979 – Changing Times – The Mighty Clouds of Joy
- 1979 – Delight – Ronnie Foster
- 1979 – Happy People – Paulinho Da Costa
- 1979 – Magic Lady – Sergio Mendes
- 1979 – On the Other Side – The McCrary's
- 1979 – Splendor – Splendor
- 1979 – Nightingale – Gilberto Gil
- 1979 – Motown Superstar Series, Vol. 1 – Diana Ross
- 1980 – Let's Get Serious – Jermaine Jackson
- 1980 – 10½ – The Dramatics
- 1980 – Eight for the Eighties – Webster Lewis
- 1980 – From the Gitgo – Donnie Elbert
- 1980 – Jose Feliciano – José Feliciano
- 1980 – La Toya Jackson – La Toya Jackson
- 1980 – The Longest Road – Seals & Crofts
- 1980 – Motown Superstar Series, Vol. 13 – Gladys Knight
- 1980 – Special Things – The Pointer Sisters
- 1980 – Triumph – The Jacksons
- 1981 – Black & White - The Pointer Sisters
- 1981 – Give Me Your Love – Sylvia Striplin
- 1981 – Motown Superstar Series, Vol. 11 – Martha & the Vandellas
- 1981 – The Way I Am – Billy Preston
- 1982 – Diana's Duets – Diana Ross
- 1982 – Lionel Richie – Lionel Richie
- 1982 – Love Conquers All – Michael Wycoff
- 1982 – Reunion – The Temptations
- 1982 – So Excited! – The Pointer Sisters
- 1982 – Silk Electric – Diana Ross
- 1983 – Baby Sister – June Pointer
- 1983 – Best of Reggae Sunsplash, Vol. 2 – VVAA
- 1983 – Bet Cha Say That to All the Girls – Sister Sledge
- 1983 – Bossa Nova Hotel – Michael Sembello
- 1983 – Break Out (Pointer Sisters album) – The Pointer Sisters
- 1983 – Robbery – Teena Marie
- 1983 – Standing on the One – Jon Gibson
- 1983 – Pipes of Peace – Paul McCartney
- 1984 – Mwana – Grady Harrell
- 1989 – Come Play with Me – Grady Harrell
- 1989 – True Spirit – Ronnie Laws
- 1989 – Working Girl – Original Soundtrack
- 1990 – Brasil 88: The Sound, The Music – VVAA
- 1991 – Force Behind the Power – Diana Ross
- 1991 – Live in the Stuffenbau – Bobby Byrd
- 1992 – All for Love – Timmy T
- 1992 – Do I Ever Cross Your Mind? – George Howard
- 1992 – Too Much, Too Little, Too Late – Johnny Mathis
- 1993 – Contemporary Sounds of Nicholas, Vol. 1 – Nicholas
- 1993 – The Storyteller – Vinx
- 1994 – D2: The Mighty Ducks – Original Soundtrack
- 1994 – On & On: The Hits of Stephen Bishop – Stephen Bishop
- 1994 – A Tribute to Curtis Mayfield [Warner Bros.] – VVAA
- 1994 – Corrina, Corrina – Original Soundtrack
- 1994 – Emperors of Soul – The Temptations
- 1995 – Faith – Lords of the Underground
