= Saturday Night (Zhané album) =

Studio album by Zhané
- Released: April 22, 1997
- Recorded: 1996–1997
- Genre: R&B
- Length: 70:18
- Label: Motown
- Producer: Celestine (exec.); Edward "DJ Eddie F" Ferrell (exec.); Andre Harrell (exec.); KayGee (exec.); Charm Warren (exec.); Zhané (exec.); Renee Neufville; Rex Rideout

Zhané chronology
Pronounced Jah-Nay (1994)	Saturday Night (1997)

Singles from Saturday Night
- 1. "Request Line" Released: February 25, 1997; 2. "Crush" Released: May 20, 1997; 3. "For The Longest Time" Released: August 19, 1997

Professional ratings
Review scores
Source	Rating
AllMusic	3/5 stars
Encyclopedia of Popular Music	4/5 stars
Muzik	7/10

Saturday Night is the second and final studio album from American R&B group Zhané, released April 22, 1997, on Motown Records. The duo broke up in 1999.

The album peaked at number forty-one on the Billboard 200 chart.

== Release and reception ==
Leo Stanley of AllMusic called the album "infectious" and "more textured and funkier than [Zhané's] debut album."

== Track listing ==
No.	Title	Music	Length
1.	"Request Line"	Ashford, Gist, Lighty, Bolden, Neufville, Simpson	3:56
2.	"Saturday Night" (featuring The LOX)	Bowens, Harrison, Jacobs, Neufville, Philips, Styles	4:49
3.	"So Badd"	Brown, Gist, Lighty, Neufville, Redman, Simon	4:43
4.	"Crush"	Gist, Lighty, Neufville, Coleman	3:00
5.	"This Song Is for You"	Neufville, Swinga	4:25
6.	"Just Like That"	Ferrell, Neufville, Sparks	4:59
7.	"Last Dance"	Gist, Laws, Lighty, Neufville	4:42
8.	"Good Times"	Edwards, Rodgers	4:12
9.	"For the Longest Time"	Joel	4:16
10.	"Rendez-Vous"	Booker, Norris	4:59
11.	"My Word Is Bond"	Neufville	2:41
12.	"Kindness for Granted"	Neufville	4:55
13.	"Temporary Thing"	Norris	4:31
14.	"Confusion"	Neufville, Norris	4:12
15.	"Color"	Norris	4:59
16.	"Piece It Together" (featuring Will Downing and Najee)	Neufville	4:59
Total length:			70:18

Japanese, European, and Australian edition (bonus track)
No.	Title	Length
17.	"Let's Play"	3:01
Total length:		73:19

== Chart history ==
=== Album ===
Chart (1997)	Peak position
U.S. Billboard 200	41
U.S. R&B Albums	8

=== Singles ===
Year	Single	Peak chart positions			
Year	Single	U.S. Billboard Hot 100	U.S. Hot Dance Music/Maxi-Singles Sales	U.S. Hot R&B/Hip-Hop Singles & Tracks	U.S. Rhythmic Top 40
1997	"Request Line"	39	4	9	19
1997	"Crush"	—	—	24	—

"—" denotes releases that did not chart.

== Personnel ==
Information taken from Allmusic.

- art direction – Carol Friedman
- bass – Kirk Lyons
- composing – Naheem "Pop Holiday" Bowens, Michael Harrison, Jean Norris, Gus Redman, Jeffrey Simon
- design – David Harley
- drums – Naheem "Pop Holiday" Bowens, Steve Williams
- engineering – Ben Arrindell, Mike Iverson
- executive production – Celestine, Edward "DJ Eddie F" Ferrell, Andre Harrell, Kay Gee, Charm Warren, Zhané
- guitar – Norman Brown, Mike Campbell
- guitar (bass) – Tony Bridges, Freddie Cash
- keyboards – Scott Booker, Naheem "Pop Holiday" Bowens
- mastering – Chris Gehringer
- mixing – Daniel Abrahams
- multi-instruments – Scott Booker, Malik Pendleton, J.R. Swinga
- percussion – Peter Basil, Bashiri Johnson
- photography – Heidi Niemata
- piano – Renee Neufville, Jean Norris, Kenny Seymour
- production – Renee Neufville, Rex Rideout
- project coordinator – Tony Vanias
- rapping – The LOX
- synthesizer – Scott Booker, Jean Norris
- trumpet – Kevin Batcheler, Kenyatta Beasley, Mark Leadfoot
- vocal arranging – Malik Pendleton
- vocals (background) – Will Downing, Malik Pendleton, Zhané
