= Ride the Rhythm =

Studio album by Chill Rob G
- Released: May 23, 1989
- Recorded: 1987−1989
- Studio: Airwave (New York)
- Genre: Jazz rap
- Length: 48:53
- Label: Wild Pitch
- Producers: DJ Mark the 45 King; Nephie Centeno; Pasemaster Mase; Prince Paul

Chill Rob G chronology
Ride the Rhythm (1989)	Blackgold (2000)

Singles from Ride the Rhythm
- 1. "Dope Rhymes" Released: 1988; 2. "Court Is Now in Session" Released: 1989; 3. "Let Me Show You" Released: February 14, 1990; 4. "The Power" Released: July 2, 1990

Professional ratings
Review scores
Source	Rating
AllMusic	3/5 stars
RapReviews	7.5/10

Ride the Rhythm is the debut studio album by American rapper Chill Rob G. It was released on May 23, 1989, via Wild Pitch Records. The recording sessions took place at Air Wave Sound in New York. The album was produced by the 45 King, Nephie Centeno, Pasemaster Mase, and Prince Paul. It peaked at number 60 on the Top R&B/Hip-Hop Albums in the United States.

It contains four singles: "Dope Rhymes", "Court Is Now in Session", "Let Me Show You" and "The Power". In 1998, the album was selected as one of The Source's "100 Best Rap Albums". His song "The Power" appeared in The Fisher King (1991), A Low Down Dirty Shame (1994), First Kid (1996) and Romy and Michele: In the Beginning (2005).

== Track listing ==
No.	Title	Writer(s)	Producer(s)	Length
1.	"Future Shock"	Robert Frazier; Mark James	The 45 King	4:18
2.	"Bad Dreams"	Frazier; James	The 45 King	3:24
3.	"Court Is Now in Session"	Frazier; James	The 45 King	4:22
4.	"Motivation"	Frazier; James	The 45 King	3:55
5.	"Dope Rhymes"	Frazier; James	The 45 King	3:24
6.	"The Power"	Frazier; James; Michael Munzing; Luca Anzilotti	Nephie Centeno; the 45 King	6:07
7.	"Ride the Rhythm"	Frazier; James	The 45 King	3:56
8.	"Make It"	Frazier; James	The 45 King	4:10
9.	"Let the Words Flow"	Frazier; James	The 45 King	4:17
10.	"Let Me Show You"	Frazier; James	The 45 King	4:14
11.	"Wild Pitch" (KDAY Remix)	Frazier; James	The 45 King	2:56
12.	"Let Me Show You" (Remix)	Frazier; James	Pasemaster Mase; Prince Paul; the 45 King	4:32
Total length:				48:53

== Samples ==
Court Is Now in Session

- "The Jam" by Graham Central Station
- "Soul Power '74" by Maceo & the Macks

Motivation

- "You're Getting a Little Too Smart" by Detroit Emeralds

Dope Rhymes

- "Cut the Cake" by Average White Band

Ride the Rhythm

- "Hard Times" by Baby Huey
- "Baby Let Me Kiss You" by King Floyd

Make It

- "Music Is the Key (House Key)" by J.M. Silk

Let the Words Flow

- "Voices Inside My Head" by the Police
- "Funky Drummer" by James Brown

Let Me Show You

- "N.T." by Kool & the Gang
- "The Boss" by James Brown

Wild Pitch (KDAY Remix)

- "Books and Basketball (Montage)" by Billy Preston & Syreeta
- "Gimmie What You Got" by Le Pamplemousse

Let Me Show You (Remix)

- Dance, Dance, Dance by Claudja Barry & Ronnie Jones
- "N.T." by Kool & the Gang
- "One Man Band (Plays All Alone)" by Monk Higgins & the Specialties

== Personnel ==
- Robert "Chill Rob G" Frazier – lyrics, vocals
- Kim Davis – additional vocals (track 6)
- Les July – bass guitar
- Jack Bashkow – flute, saxophone
- Crazy O – scratches
- Mark "The 45 King" James – producer, mixing
- Nephie Centeno – producer & mixing (track 6)
- Vincent Mason – producer & remixing (track 12)
- Paul "Prince Paul" Huston – producer & remixing (track 12)
- John Dimmick – engineering
- Terry Clarke – design
- Peter Bodtke – photography

== Charts ==
Chart (1990)	Peak position
US Top R&B/Hip-Hop Albums (Billboard)	60
