= It's Alright (Queen Latifah song) =

Single by Queen Latifah

from the album Order in the Court and Nothing to Lose (soundtrack)
- Released: June 28, 1997
- Recorded: 1997
- Length: 3:31
- Label: Tommy Boy Music
- Songwriter(s): Darryl McClary, Faith Evans, Mike Allen, Kevin McCord, Kenny Whitehead
- Producer(s): Darryl "Big Baby" McClary, "Suga" Mike Allen

Queen Latifah singles chronology
"I Can't Understand" (1994)	"It's Alright" (1997)	"Bananas (Who You Gonna Call?)" (1998)

"It's Alright" is a single by the American hip-hop artist and actress Queen Latifah, from her 1998 album, Order in the Court and the soundtrack to the 1997 film, Nothing to Lose. Similar to Latifah's 1994 song "Weekend Love" and subsequently, her 1998 song, "Paper", this was one of Latifah's singles to feature only her singing, with no rap vocals. The song is anchored by a sample of Alicia Myers' 1981 proto-disco hit "I Want To Thank You." The song originally appeared on the soundtrack to the film Nothing to Lose. The song was included on Latifah's 1998 album Order in the Court with slight changes.

The original version of "It's Alright" on the Nothing to Lose soundtrack features background vocals from Faith Evans, who co-wrote the song. However, the version of Latifah's album, Order in the Court, contains background vocals from the hip-hop artist Lil' Mo.

== Track listing ==
US Vinyl Release
A1. "It's Alright" (Album Version) (3:31)
A2. "It's Alright" (Instrumental) (3:43)
B1. "It's Alright" (Remix) (4:23)
B2. "It's Alright" (A Capella) (3:21)
