= Sending My Love =

Single by Zhané

from the album Pronounced Jah-Nay
- Released: May 23, 1994
- Recorded: 1993
- Genre: R&B
- Length: 3:41
- Label: Motown
- Songwriters: R. Neufville; J. Norris; KayGee; Treach; V. Brown; E. Sermon; P. Smith
- Producer: Naughty by Nature

Zhané singles chronology
"Groove Thang" (1994)	"Sending My Love" (1994)	"Vibe" (1994)

"Sending My Love" is a song by American R&B group Zhané recorded for their debut album, Pronounced Jah-Nay (1994). The song was released as the album's third single on May 23, 1994 by Motown. It was written by group members Renee Neufville and Jean Norris with KayGee, Treach, V. Brown, Erick Sermon and PMD. The song peaked at numbers 40 and 53 on the US Billboard Hot 100 and Cash Box Top 100, and was almost to be featured on the soundtrack to the 1994 film Four Weddings and a Funeral. The accompanying music video was directed by American film director, producer and actor Antoine Fuqua. In November 2020, American duo Chloe x Halle covered the song as an exclusive Spotify release.

== Release and reception ==
Jose F. Promis at AllMusic called "Sending My Love" a "glorious, elegant, and sleek" song. Larry Flick from Billboard magazine wrote, "This infectious third single, produced by Naughty By Nature, proves that the duo is likely to be around a while. Here the twosome offers more of its fine-tuned, trademark blend of subtle groove textures, smooth vocals, and sweet harmonies. It's a winning formula pronounced, simply, "hit"." Bill Speed and John Martinucci from the Gavin Report commented, "Yes! Yes! Yes! This is THE jam. [...] With 'Sending My Love', Zhane delivers another radio-friendly groove thang."

Ralph Tee from Music Week's RM Dance Update named it "a light chirpy tune with floating vocals and keyboards together with a chunky two-step bassline." He added, "Not as instant as the last couple of singles, and without a familiar breakbeat to help it along, this is unlikely to be the track that sets them up for the big time but it's still this week's most firing import. Best stick one away as this is exactly the sort of tune that comes back around just when you can't get it anymore."

== Track listings ==
- CD single and 12", vinyl
1. "Sending My Love" (Sticky Stamp Mix) - 3:57
2. "Sending My Love" (OG Bass Edit) - 3:43
3. "Sending My Love" (S.I.D.'s Mix) - 4:23
4. "Sending My Love" (Al's Mix) - 6:05
5. "Sending My Love" (LP Version) - 3:42
- 12", vinyl (promo)
1. "Sending My Love" (Sticky Stamp Mix) - 3:57
2. "Sending My Love" (OG Bass Edit) - 3:43
3. "Sending My Love" (S.I.D.'s Mix) - 4:23
4. "Sending My Love" (Al's Edit) - 4:15
5. "Sending My Love" (Acapella) - 3:01
6. "Sending My Love" (LP Version) - 3:42
7. "Sending My Love" (Al's Mix) - 6:05
8. "Sending My Love" (Lovestrumental) - 3:56
9. "Sending My Love" (Sunra Hip Hop Edit) - 4:00

== Personnel ==
Information taken from Discogs.

- additional production – Cedeño, Larry Robinson, Soulfinga
- production – Naughty by Nature
- remixing – Cedeño, Al "Baby Jesus" Eaton, Larry Robinson, S.I.D., Soulfinga
- writing – Naughty by Nature, Renee A. Neufville

== Charts ==
=== Weekly charts ===
Chart (1994)	Peak position
Australia (ARIA)	126
US Billboard Hot 100	40
US Hot R&B/Hip-Hop Songs (Billboard)	5
US Maxi-Singles Sales (Billboard)	16
US Rhythmic (Billboard)	26
US Cash Box Top 100	53

=== Year-end charts ===
Chart (1994)	Position
US Hot R&B/Hip-Hop Songs (Billboard)	18
