= Gangsta Bitch =

1993 single by Apache

Single by Apache

from the album Apache Ain't Shit
- B-side: "Apache Ain't Shit"
- Released: February 26, 1993
- Recorded: 1992
- Genre: East Coast hip hop, gangsta rap
- Length: 4:45
- Label: Tommy Boy
- Songwriters: Anthony Peaks, Jonathan Davis
- Producer: A Tribe Called Quest

Apache singles chronology
"Gangsta Bitch" (1993)	"Do Fa Self" (1993)

"Gangsta Bitch" is the debut single released from American rapper Apache's debut album, Apache Ain't Shit (1993). Produced by Q-Tip of A Tribe Called Quest, "Gangsta Bitch" became Apache's only charting single, making it to No. 67 on the Billboard Hot 100. It contains a sample of "Love and Happiness" by Monty Alexander, originally made famous by Al Green.

"Gangsta Bitch" later appeared in the 2008 video game, Saints Row 2.

== Single track listing ==
1. "Gangsta Bitch" (Original Version)- 4:47
2. "Gangsta Bitch" (Clean Version)- 4:44
3. "Apache Ain't Shit" (LP Version)- 3:33
4. "Gangsta Bitch" (Clean Version Edit)- 4:21
5. "Gangsta Bitch" (Instrumental)- 4:47

== Charts ==
Chart (1993)	Peak position
US Billboard Hot 100	67
US Hot R&B/Hip-Hop Songs (Billboard)	49
US Hot Rap Singles (Billboard)	11
US Hot Dance Music/Maxi-Singles Sales (Billboard)	4
US Cash Box Top 100	65
