= Groove Thang =

1994 single by Zhané

Single by Zhané

from the album Pronounced Jah-Nay
- Released: January 1994
- Genre: Dance
- Length: 3:55
- Label: Motown
- Composers: Naughty by Nature; Patrice Rushen; Charles Mims Jr.; Sheree Brown; Freddie D. Washington
- Lyricist: Renée A. Neufville
- Producer: Naughty by Nature

Zhané singles chronology
| "Hey Mr. D.J." (1993) | "Groove Thang" (1994) | "Sending My Love" (1994) |

Music video
- "Groove Thang" (live) on YouTube

Naughty by Nature singles chronology
| "Written on Ya Kitten" (1993) | "Groove Thang" (1994) | "Clap Yo Hands" (1995) |

"Groove Thang" is a song by American R&B group Zhané from their debut album, Pronounced Jah-Nay (1994). Released in January 1994, by Motown, it was produced by and features a rap verse from Naughty by Nature. Written by group member Renée A. Neufville, the song is based on a sample of "Haven't You Heard" as performed by Patrice Rushen. It peaked at number 17 on the US Billboard Hot 100. A music video was produced to promote the single, directed by Markus Blunder.

== Critical reception ==
Jose F. Promis at AllMusic considered "Groove Thang" to be "smooth and infectious" but noted its similarity to the group's previous single, stating that it "sounds like 'Hey Mr. D.J.' part two." J.D. Considine from The Baltimore Sun described it as "near-irresistible" and a "sturdy, bass-thumping number". Larry Flick from Billboard magazine noted that it "is propelled by precious lead vocals and a chorus that sneaks up on you when you least expect it. Plush instrumentation is another plus in the act's bid to keep the momentum at radio and retail in high gear. Overall, odds are in its favor." Ralph Tee from Music Week's RM Dance Update named it "a fresh new tune destined to do huge things", "with chirpy vocals and a bouncy mid-tempo dance groove". James Hamilton described it as a "slowed down Patrice Rushen 'Haven't You Heard' based sweet slinky strong jogger" in his weekly RM dance music column.

== Track listings ==
- 12-inch vinyl
1. "Groove Thang" (LP version) – 3:54
2. "Groove Thang" (Kay Gee's remix) – 4:25
3. "Groove Thang" (remix instrumental) – 4:29
4. "Groove Thang" (acapella) – 3:38
5. "Groove Thang" (Maurice's club mix) – 7:40
6. "Groove Thang" (Maurice's Groove dub) – 7:06
- Maxi-CD single
1. "Groove Thang" (LP version) – 3:54
2. "Groove Thang" (Kay Gee's remix) – 4:25
3. "Groove Thang" (Maurice's club mix) – 7:40
4. "Groove Thang" (Maurice's Groove dub) – 7:06
5. "Groove Thang" (remix instrumental) – 4:29

== Charts ==
=== Weekly charts ===
| Chart (1994) | Peak position |
|---|---|
| Australia (ARIA) | 17 |
| Canada Retail Singles (The Record) | 2 |
| Canada Dance/Urban (RPM) | 3 |
| Europe (Eurochart Hot 100) | 84 |
| Europe (European Dance Radio) | 6 |
| France (SNEP) | 42 |
| Germany (GfK) | 99 |
| Netherlands (Dutch Top 40 Tipparade) | 17 |
| Netherlands (Single Top 100 Tipparade) | 4 |
| New Zealand (Recorded Music NZ) | 7 |
| UK Singles (Official Charts) | 34 |
| UK Dance (Music Week) | 5 |
| UK Club Chart (Music Week) | 3 |
| US Billboard Hot 100 | 17 |
| US Dance Club Play (Billboard) | 13 |
| US Hot R&B Singles (Billboard) | 2 |
| US Maxi-Singles Sales (Billboard) | 1 |
| US Top 40/Mainstream (Billboard) | 33 |
| US Top 40/Rhythm-Crossover (Billboard) | 4 |
| US Cash Box Top 100 | 17 |

=== Year-end charts ===
| Chart (1994) | Position |
|---|---|
| Brazil (Crowley) | 81 |
| Canada Dance/Urban (RPM) | 41 |
| UK Club Chart (Music Week) | 72 |
| US Billboard Hot 100 | 74 |
| US Hot R&B Singles (Billboard) | 20 |
| US Maxi-Singles Sales (Billboard) | 25 |

== Release history ==
| Region | Date | Format(s) | Label(s) | Ref. |
|---|---|---|---|---|
| United States | January 1994 | 12-inch vinyl; CD; cassette | Motown | |
| Japan | February 25, 1994 | Mini-CD | Motown | |
| United Kingdom | March 7, 1994 | 7-inch vinyl; 12-inch vinyl; CD; cassette | Motown | |
| Australia | April 4, 1994 | CD; cassette | Motown; Polydor | |
