= Go Head =

"Go Head" is the only single from Queen Latifah's greatest hits album, She's a Queen: A Collection of Hits. The song was released in September 2002, and was co-produced by Big Tank and Timbaland.

== Production ==
The song was written by Queen Latifah and Big Tank, and was recorded at Battery Studios in New York City. Timbaland, a co-producer, sampled an uncredited Chaoui song. Timbaland has previously used uncredited samples from North African and Middle Eastern music. Timbaland also used an uncredited sample of Aaliyah’s single Don't Know What to Tell Ya, which he produced in 2001.

== Music video ==
The music video for "Go Head" features Queen Latifah and a few of her friends riding on motorcycles. The hip-hop artist Lil' Kim and the R&B singer Sharissa, a Motown label mate of Queen Latifah's, also appear in the video. "Go Head" was nominated for a Grammy for Best Female Solo Rap Performance in 2004 but lost to Missy Elliott's "Work It".
