= Roll wit tha Flava =

Compilation album by various artists
- Released: 1993
- Genre: Hip-hop
- Label: Epic

Roll wit tha Flava is a compilation album produced by Flavor Unit and released by Epic Records in 1993.

== Background, production, and release ==
In late 1992, Queen Latifah created Flavor Unit Records. The label, located in Jersey City, New Jersey, served as a production company before pivoting to releasing music. In March 1993, Flavor Unit entered an exclusive distribution contract with Epic Records, with the album Roll wit tha Flava being included in it, with a slated release of April that year.

The first single from the album, which was the title track, was released on February 9. It was supported by a music video, featuring contributions by the Flavor Unit MCs. The single was moderately successful, peaking at No. 8 in the Dance Singles Sales chart and No. 86 in the Billboard Hot 100. The album itself was released on May 3, 1993.

== Critical reception ==
Heather Phares of AllMusic noted how the album "collects a diverse array of rap singles from Nikki D., Flavor Units MCs, Latee, and Cee/Leshaun". She praised "L.A. Bring Tha Flava", "Sounds of Fattness", "On the Bone Again", "Bring It On," and "Enough Is Enough, calling them "among the highlights of the album". Michael A. Gonzales, writing for Billboard, stated that it was "working well as an introduction to the Flavor Unit posse", praising the multiple artists concept and the album's "gritty funk and street attitude."

Bob Davis, writing for the Fort Worth Star-Telegram, likened the album to a salad bar, stating that although "there's plenty on this compilation [sic] to turn your stomach", "the digging pays off in large portions". Kevin Jackson of the Jamaica Observer called it an "all-star compilation", stating that "Hey Mr. D.J." "became a party anthem".

== Charts ==
Chart (1993)	Peak position
US Top R&B Albums (Billboard)	29

== Track listing ==
No.	Title	Writer(s)	Length
1.	"L.A. Bring Tha Flava" (performed by Queen Latifah)	Dana Owens	3:15
2.	"Roll wit tha Flava" (performed by The Flavor Unit MC's)	Heavy D & the Boyz, Anthony Criss, Freddie Foxxx, D. Jones, Dana Owens	4:08
3.	"Uuh" (performed by D-Nice)	Derrick Jones	3:17
4.	"Sounds of Fattness"	C. Abney, C. Morales	3:43
5.	"Badd Boyz" (performed by The Almighty RSO)	M. Ennis, T. Johnson, R. Scott	5:49
6.	"Gimme Head" (performed by Cee and Leshaun)	Cee, Leshaun	4:06
7.	"On the Bone Again"	D. Gibson, D. Jones	4:59
8.	"Rough Enough" (performed by Freddie Foxxx)	Freddie Foxxx	4:20
9.	"Let Yourself Go" (performed by Latee)	T. Johnson	4:00
10.	"Freak Out" (performed by Nikki D)		3:11
11.	"Enough Is Enough" (performed by Rottin Razkals)	A. Bahr, Naughty by Nature, J. Ray	3:02
12.	"Keep It Real" (performed by Apache)	Apache	3:37
13.	"Since You Asked" (performed by Groove Garden)	Groove Garden	4:00
14.	"Bring It On" (performed by Naughty by Nature)	Vernon Brown, Anthony Criss, Kaygee Gist	3:46
15.	"Roll wit tha Flava (remix)" (performed by The Flavor Unit MC's)	Heavy D & the Boyz, Anthony Criss, Freddie Foxxx, C. Morales, Dana Owens, Roachford	4:41
16.	"Hey Mister DJ" (performed by Zhane)	A. Bahr, Vernon Brown, Anthony Criss, Kaygee Gist, Z. Grey, Jhane	4:25
