= The 45 King =

American hip-hop producer and DJ (1961–2023)

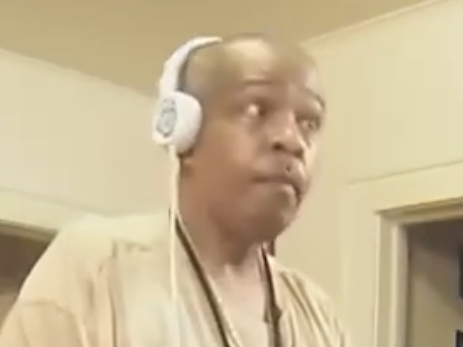
- James in 2015

Background information
- Born: Mark Howard James; October 16, 1961
- Origin: The Bronx, New York, U.S.
- Died: October 19, 2023 (aged 62) East Orange, New Jersey, U.S.
- Genres: Hip-hop
- Occupations: Record producer; disc jockey
- Years active: 1982–2023
- Labels: 45 King Records; Tuff City
- Formerly of: Flavor Unit

Mark Howard James (October 16, 1961 – October 19, 2023), professionally known as The 45 King and also known as DJ Mark the 45 King, was an American hip-hop producer and DJ from The Bronx, New York. He began DJing in the mid-1980s. His pseudonym, the 45 King, came from his ability to make beats using obscure 45 RPM records.

== Life and career ==
In November 1989, the re-release of "The King is Here" / "The 900 Number" peaked at #60 in the UK Singles Chart, his only appearance in a UK chart.

In the early 1990s, drug addiction caused him to lose a production deal that he signed with Warner Bros. Records.

In July 1990, Manchester-born DJ Chad Jackson sampled "The 900 Number" on his single "Hear the Drummer (Get Wicked)", which reached #3 in the UK Singles Chart.

In 1996, Washington, D.C.–based go-go artist DJ Kool had a hit with the song "Let Me Clear My Throat". It was call-and-response vocals over a chopped half of the "900 Number" beat. DJ Kool did not just sample the track: he also acknowledged James as the song's originator.

In 1998, James produced "Hard Knock Life (Ghetto Anthem)" for Jay-Z. The song was a hit and featured a looped chorus from the original cast album of the Broadway musical Annie. In an interview, Jay-Z spoke on James' importance to hip-hop and called him a true pioneer of the business.

Following the success of "Hard Knock Life," James heard the Dido song "Thank You" in the 1998 film Sliding Doors. He looped the sample and added a bassline, then sent the result to Interscope Records. The recording was later used for the Eminem song "Stan", as the rapper interpreted Dido's lyrics as being about an obsessed fan.

James died on October 19, 2023, at the age of 62.

== Selected production credits ==
- Chill Rob G – F.U. (Rockin Wit The Best) (featuring Double J, God Lakim, The 45 King) – SpitSLAM Record Label Group, 2022
- Ghostface Killah – Blood in the Streets (featuring AZ) – Tommy Boy, 2014
- Fatlip – The Bass Line |\| I Got the Shit |\| M.I.A. – Delicious Vinyl, 2005
- Diamond D – U Don't Owe Me – Dymond Mine Records, 2005
- King Gordy – Nobody Hates Nothin' - Web Entertainment, 2003
- Biz Markie – Turn Back the Hands of Time – Tommy Boy, 2003
- Princess Superstar - Bad Babysitter (Remix) - Rapster Records, 2002
- Celph Titled – Right Now – Bronx Science Recordings, 2001
- Craig Mack – The Wooden Horse – NY.LA Music, 2001
- Dyme – Ladies Are U Wit Me – Interscope Records, 2001
- Paula Perry – Y'all Chickens Make Me Laugh – Fully-Blown Recordings, 2000
- Chill Rob G – Let Me Know (45 Remix) – Echo International, 2000
- Big Scoob – Can Du – White Label, 2000
- Eminem – Stan – Aftermath/Interscope/Universal, 2000
- Rakim – How I Get Down – Universal Records, 1999
- Common – Car Horn – Groove Attack, 1999
- Peanut Butter Wolf – Run the Line (Remix) – Stones Throw, 1998
- Jay-Z – "Hard Knock Life (Ghetto Anthem) – Roc-A-Fella/Def Jam/Universal, 1998
- Fanclub Erdberg – Anton Polster Du Bist Leiwand – Mego, 1997
- Bush Babees – The Love Song (King Remix) – Kenar, 1997
- Queen Latifah – Name Callin' – Tommy Boy/Warner Bros., 1996
- Maniac Mob – Get Up – Arista, 1995
- C&C Music Factory – Do You Wanna Get Funky? (Remix) – Columbia/SME, 1994
- Ed Lover & Doctor Dré – Who's the Man – Relativity, 1994
- PMD – Thought I Lost My Spot – RCA/BMG, 1994
- Class A Felony – Hyped Up |\| Hostage |\| Gotta Go, Gotta Go – Polygram, 1993
- Diamond D – Best Kept Secret (Remix) |\| Check 1, 2 – Chemistry/Mercury/PolyGram, 1992
- Apache – Do Fa Self – Tommy Boy/Warner Bros., 1992
- Jaz-O – Sign of the Crimes – EMI America, 1991
- Def Jef – Soul Provider |\| Don't Sleep (Open Your Eyes) – Delicious Vinyl, 1991
- MC Lyte – Big Bad Sister |\| Kamikaze |\| Like a Virgin |\| Absolutely Positively...Practical Jokes – First Priority Music/Atlantic, 1991
- Lisa Stansfield – "All Around the World" (Remix) – Arista/BMG, 1990
- Madonna – "Keep it Together" (Remix) – Sire/Warner Bros., 1990
- David Bowie – "Fame" (90 Remix) [feat. Queen Latifah] – EMI USA, 1990
- Maestro Fresh Wes – Drop the Needle (Remix) – LMR/RCA Records, 1990
- Lakim Shabazz – Lost Tribe of Shabazz – Tuff City, 1990
- Eric B. & Rakim – "Let the Rhythm Hit 'Em" (Remix) – MCA, 1990
- Digital Underground – Packet Man (Remix) – Tommy Boy/Warner Bros., 1990
- Shelly Thunder - Working Girl (Remix) - Mango, 1990
- Queen Latifah – Come Into My House (Mark 45 King Mix) – Tommy Boy/Warner Bros., 1990
- Markey Fresh – The Mack of Rap – Jive/RCA, 1989
- X-Clan – Heed the Word of the Brother – 4th & B'Way/Island/PolyGram, 1989
- Eric B. & Rakim – "Microphone Fiend" (Remix) – MCA, 1989
- Salt-N-Pepa – My Mic Sounds Nice (Remix) – Next Plateau/London/PolyGram, 1989
- Lord Alibaski – Lyrics in Motion |\| Top Gun – Tuff City, 1989
- King Sun – Fat Tape |\| It's a Heat Up – Zakia/Profile, 1989
- Chill Rob G – Ride the Rhythm– Wild Pitch/EMI, 1989
- Queen Latifah – All Hail the Queen – Tommy Boy/Warner Bros., 1989
- Too Nice – Cold Facts (Remix) – Arista/BMG, 1989
- Double J – Bless the Funk – 4th & B'Way/Island/PolyGram, 1989
- Big Daddy Kane – Set It Off – Cold Chillin', 1988
- Chill Rob G – Chillin' – Wild Pitch/EMI, 1988
- Lakim Shabazz – Pure Righteousness – Tuff City, 1988
- Gang Starr – Movin' On |\| Gusto |\| Knowledge – Wild Pitch/EMI, 1988
- Latee – No Tricks |\| Wake Up – Wild Pitch/EMI, 1988
- Gang Starr – Believe Dat! |\| Bust a Move Boy |\| To Be a Champion – Wild Pitch/EMI, 1987
- Latee – This Cut's Got Flavor |\| Puttin' on the Hits – Wild Pitch/EMI, 1987

== Discography ==
- Westbound Beats – Westbound Records, 2023
- Back To The Beat Vol. 2 – Redefinition Records, 2015
- Back To The Beat – Redefinition Records, 2014
- Scion A/V Remix Project – Scion Audio/Visual, 2008
- The Cat Jams – Tuff City, 2005
- Beats of the Month – Bronx Science, 2000/2001 (November, December, January, February, March, April, May volumes of "Lost Breakbeat" style beats)
- Beats for the New Millennium, Vol 1 & 2 – 45 King Records, 2000
- Put the Funk Out There – Rock-A-Fella, 1999
- Universal Beat Generation, Vol 1-3 – Ultimate Dilemma, 1998 (European label "The Lost Breakbeats" re-release)
- Breakapalooza Vol 1 & 2 – Tuff City, 1997
- Champain – Tuff City, 1997
- Beats Don't Fail Me Now (12" Single) – CLR Records, 1997
- Breakamania, Vol 1-3 – Real Tuff Breaks, 1997
- Grooves for a Quiet Storm – Tuff City, 1996
- Killer Beets, Vol 1-3 – Music Station, 1996
- Real Tuff Jazz – Tuff City, 1995
- Zig-a-Ziggin ZZ – Tuff City, 1995
- Straight Outta Da Crate, Vol 1-5 – Tuff City, 1993
- The Lost Breakbeats – 45 King Records, 1993–1996
- 45 Kingdom – Tuff City, 1990
- Rhythmical Madness (with DJ Louie Louie) – Tuff City, 1990
- On A Mission (from "One Voice: Pride") – Ruffhouse, 1990
- The 45 King Presents: The Flavor Unit – Tuff City, 1990
- Master of the Game – Tuff City, 1989
- The King is Here (with Markey Fresh) (12" Single) – Tuff City, 1989
- Red, Black, and Green (with Lakim Shabazz) (12" Single) – Tuff City, 1989
- When a Wise Man Speaks/Catching a 'Tude/Rocking With Tony H (12" Single) – Tuff City, 1989
- The 900 Number EP – Tuff City, 1987
- Funky Beats '84 – 45 King, 1984
- Just Beats – 45 King, 1987
