= Silent Assassin =

Studio album by Sly and Robbie
- Released: 1989
- Genres: Reggae, hip-hop
- Label: Island
- Producer: KRS-One

Sly and Robbie chronology
| The Summit (1988) | Silent Assassin (1989) | Two Rhythms Clash (1989) |

Silent Assassin is a studio album by the Jamaican musicians Sly and Robbie, released in 1989 via Island Records.

== Production ==
The album was produced by KRS-One, at the suggestion of Island; it was KRS's desire to make a "commercial" rap album. Queen Latifah and Young M.C., among others, make guest appearances on Silent Assassin.

== Critical reception ==
Professional ratings
Review scores
| Source | Rating |
|---|---|
| AllMusic | 3/5 stars |
| Audio | B |
| Chicago Tribune | 3/4 stars |
| Robert Christgau | B+ |
| The Encyclopedia of Popular Music | 3/5 stars |
| Houston Chronicle | 3/4 stars |
| Ottawa Citizen | 3/5 stars |
| The Rolling Stone Album Guide | 3.5/5 stars |
| Spin Alternative Record Guide | 8/10 |
| St. Petersburg Times | 4/5 stars |

The Washington Post wrote that "the rhythm grooves on Silent Assassin are deeper, sexier and more melodic than those on almost any other rap record." The Globe and Mail deemed the album "a tough, articulate, rhythmically powerful blend of modern reggae and rap and hip hop." The St. Petersburg Times considered "Dance Hall" "arguably the best rap track of 1989." The State called the album "a powerful melding of reggae, funk and hip hop, and thanks to contributions from rap stars ... it's credible as well as accessible."

Trouser Press called it "an ambitious undertaking," writing that "Latifah rules the mic on 'Woman for the Job'." The Spin Alternative Record Guide thought that it "was scrupulously intelligent and involving, yet it was an '80s-style consolidation instead of a true fusion or '90s-style deconstruction."

== Track listing ==
| No. | Title | Length |
|---|---|---|
| 1. | "Rebel" | 3:46 |
| 2. | "Adventures of a Bullet" | 3:50 |
| 3. | "Woman for the Job" | 4:07 |
| 4. | "Man on a Mission" | 3:30 |
| 5. | "Steppin'" | 3:08 |
| 6. | "Under Arrest" | 5:00 |
| 7. | "No One Can Top This Boy" | 3:35 |
| 8. | "Dance Hall" | 6:49 |
| 9. | "Party Together" | 5:22 |
| 10. | "Living a Lie" | 4:39 |
| 11. | "Come Again" | 2:40 |
| 12. | "Letters to the President" | 4:27 |
| 13. | "Ride the Riddim" | 4:28 |
| 14. | "It's Me" | 3:25 |

== Personnel ==
- Sly Dunbar – drums
- Robbie Shakespeare – bass
- KRS-One – production, vocals
- Queen Latifah – vocals
- Young M.C. – vocals
- Shah of Brooklyn – vocals
- Bernard Wright – keyboards
- William "Spaceman" Patterson – guitar
