= Just Another Day... =

1993 single by Queen Latifah

Single by Queen Latifah

from the album Black Reign
- Released: 1993
- Genre: East Coast hip-hop; R&B
- Label: Motown
- Songwriters: Queen Latifah; Anthony Peaks
- Producer: S.I.D. Reynolds

Queen Latifah singles chronology
"U.N.I.T.Y." (1993)	"Just Another Day..." (1993)	"Black Hand Side" (1994)

"Just Another Day..." is a single released from Queen Latifah's 1993 third studio album Black Reign. The song was written by Queen Latifah and Apache. The CD single version features New Jack Swing remixes by Teddy Riley and Lil' Chris Smith of Blackstreet.

"Just Another Day..." peaked at no. 54 on the Billboard Hot 100 during the week of April 2, 1994, and remained on the chart for 11 weeks.

The song recounts a seemingly average day in Latifah's neighborhood, which she refers to as the "hood". While Latifah's neighborhood may be dangerous, with stray bullets and the presence of police, Latifah is proud of where she is from and asserts that her neighborhood will be ok regardless of the what happens. The first line of the first verse ("well it's a beautiful day in the neighborhood, a beautiful day in the neighborhood") is a play on the children's television show song, "Won't You Be My Neighbor?" from Mister Rogers' Neighborhood.

== Sampling ==
The song contains uncredited samples of Herb Alpert's "Making Love in the Rain" and Slick Rick's "Hey Young World". Logic's 2011 mixtape Young Sinatra interpolates Latifah's song in "Just Another Day (In My Mind)". The song was also featured in the 1994 HBO documentary Gang War: Bangin' In Little Rock about street gangs in Little Rock, Arkansas.

Fat Joe's non-album single "Another Day" draws inspiration from "Just Another Day...".

== Music video ==
The music video was directed by Mark Gerard and filmed in Black and White in Latifah's hometown of East Orange, New Jersey and the Hayes Homes Housing Projects in Newark, New Jersey. Rapper Apache has a cameo in the video.

There was an alternate version of the video created specifically for MTV and other Paramount Global owned networks. This same version was uploaded to her official Vevo YouTube channel. On this edit, the gun shots are censored from the chorus, logos on t-shirts from extras in the video are blurred, and she isn't seen lip-syncing the end of verse 3, where she mouths an explicit lyric.

== Formats and track listings ==
Promo CD single # 1

1. Radio Edit # LP version
2. New Jack Remix Edit (Remixed by Teddy Riley, "Lil" Chris Smith)
3. New Jack Remix Edit (Clean version) (Remixed by Teddy Riley, "Lil" Chris Smith)
4. New Jack Remix (Remixed by Teddy Riley, "Lil" Chris Smith)
5. New Jack Acapella # Instrumental

Promo CD single 2

1. Pop Radio Edit
2. LP version
3. New Jack Pop Radio Edit (Remixed by Teddy Riley)
4. New Jack Acapella
5. Instrumental

Promo CD single # 3/Promo 12" vinyl single # 1

1. It Feels Good, Yeah Remix edit (Clean version) (Remixed by Maseo) [Side A on promo vinyl]
2. It Feels Good, Yeah Remix (Remixed by Maseo) [Side A on promo vinyl]
3. New Jack Remix (Remixed by Teddy Riley) [Side B on promo vinyl]
4. LP Version [Side B on promo vinyl]
5. New Jack Acapella [Side B on promo vinyl]

Promo 12" vinyl single # 2

Side A

1. Radio Edit
2. LP Edit
3. New Jack Remix Edit (Remixed by Teddy Riley, "Lil" Chris Smith)
4. New Jack Remix (Remixed by Teddy Riley, "Lil" Chris Smith)

Side B

1. New Jack Extended Remix (Remixed by Teddy Riley)
2. Instrumental
3. New Jack Percapella (Remixed by Teddy Riley)
4. New Jack Acapella

US 12" vinyl single

Side A

1. "Just Another Day..." LP Version
2. "Just Another Day..." New Jack Remix (Remixed by Teddy Riley & "Lil" Chris Smith)
3. "Just Another Day..." New Jack Percapella (Remixed by Teddy Riley, "Lil" Chris Smith)

Side B

1. "Just Another Day..." New Jack Extended Remix (Remixed by Teddy Riley, "Lil" Chris Smith)
2. "Just Another Day..." Instrumental
3. "Just Another Day..." New Jack Acapella

US CD/Cassette maxi single

1. "Just Another Day..." LP Version
2. "Just Another Day..." New Jack Remix (Remixed by Teddy Riley, "Lil" Chris Smith)
3. "Just Another Day..." New Jack Percapella (Remixed by Teddy Riley, "Lil" Chris Smith)
4. "Just Another Day..." New Jack Extended Remix (Remixed by Teddy Riley, "Lil" Chris Smith)
5. "U.N.I.T.Y." Big Titty Mix

== Charts ==
Chart (1994)	Peak position
US Billboard Hot 100	54
US Dance Singles Sales (Billboard)	9
