= Michael Wycoff =

American singer (1956–2019)

- Born: Michael Wycoff; February 8, 1953; Torrance, California
- Origin: Los Angeles, California
- Died: March 13, 2019 (aged 66) Los Angeles
- Genres: Soul; Funk; R&B
- Occupation: Singer
- Years active: 1976–2019
- Label: RCA Records

Michael Wycoff (February 8, 1953 – March 13, 2019) was an American R&B singer. He scored several hits on the US R&B chart during the 1980s.

== Biography ==
Wycoff attended Wilmington Junior High School and Phineas Banning High School in Wilmington, Los Angeles, California. Wycoff played keyboards and sang in the school's talent shows.

Wycoff sang backup on Stevie Wonder's album Songs in the Key of Life. He signed a solo contract with RCA and released three albums between 1981 and 1983, scoring a few hit singles on the U.S. R&B charts. His second album, Love Conquers All, included the song, "Looking Up to You," that was sampled by the 1990s R&B group Zhané on their hit song, "Hey Mr. D.J." in 1993. Although both of his first two albums were acclaimed by music critics, sales remained low.

Wycoff suffered from addiction to drugs and alcohol. His addiction ultimately caused him the loss of his career, his home and his family, and Wycoff ended up homeless. At the bottom, he found his way back through his faith, beating his habit and ultimately becoming Minister of Music at several Los Angeles area churches. He died on March 13, 2019, at age 66 due to pancreatic cancer.

His oldest son is a DJ, who, in May 2013, released his own album titled A Boy and His Toys under the name DJ Michael Wycoff.

== Discography ==
=== Albums ===
Year	Album	Label	US R&B
1980	Come to My World	RCA Records	—
1982	Love Conquers All	RCA Records	54
1983	On the Line	RCA Records	54

=== Singles ===
Year	Single	Peak chart positions		
Year	Single	US Dance	US R&B	UK
1980	"Feel My Love"	—	43	—
1980	"One Alone"	—	52	—
1982	"Looking Up to You"	—	47	—
1982	"Still Got the Magic (Sweet Delight)"	37	64	—
1982	"Diamond Real"	—	—	—
1983	"Tell Me Love"	22	23	60
1983	"There's No Easy Way"	—	83	—
1983	"You Are Everything"	—	—	—
"—" denotes releases that did not chart or were not released in that territory.
