= Hey Mr. D.J. (Zhané song) =

1993 single by Zhané

Single by Zhané

from the album Pronounced Jah-Nay
- Released: August 4, 1993
- Genre: R&B; soul; dance
- Length: 4:11
- Label: Flavor Unit; Epic
- Songwriters: Keir Gist; Vincent Brown; Anthony Criss; Renee Neufville; Jean Norris; Abdullah Bahr
- Producer: 118th Street Productions

Zhané singles chronology
"Hey Mr. D.J." (1993)	"Groove Thang" (1994)

Music video
- "Hey Mr. D.J." on YouTube

"Hey Mr. D.J." is a song by American R&B group Zhané, recorded for their debut album, Pronounced Jah-Nay (1994). Co-written by group members Renée Neufville and Jean Norris, it was released as their debut single in August 1993 by Flavor Unit and Epic, and also features a rap from Rottin Razkals member Fam. The song was produced by Naughty by Nature and samples "Looking Up to You" by Michael Wycoff. Originally, the track was recorded and released on the 1993 compilation album Roll wit tha Flava.

"Hey Mr. D.J." received critical acclaim, peaking at number six on the US Billboard Hot 100 and receiving a gold certification from the Recording Industry Association of America (RIAA) for selling 500,000 copies domestically. In Australia, it peaked at number nine, and it reached the top 30 hit in Austria, Germany, New Zealand, and the United Kingdom. The accompanying music video, directed by Peter Allen, features the duo performing at a party. In 2020, Slant Magazine included the song in their list of "The 100 Best Dance Songs of All Time".

== Critical reception ==
Upon the release, J.D. Considine from The Baltimore Sun remarked that the DJ referred to in the song "isn't a radio man but a club jockey", stating that it "perfectly captures the loping bass and infectious groove that characterizes the best club hits." Larry Flick from Billboard felt the female act "earns points for not succumbing to the temptation of being just another bunch of new fill swingers. Instead, they choose to conjure memories of the Emotions by laying pretty vocal into the context of shimmying R&B bassline and subtle disco strings. The song itself is a bit thin, but engaging nonetheless—thanks mostly to a charismatic new act with the potential to lure more than a few DJs to the fold." James Bernard from Entertainment Weekly remarked that "Hey Mr. D.J." "caught fire with its prancing bass line and anthemic chorus." Rod Edwards from the Gavin Report found that their sound "falls between hip hop and R&B". Pan-European magazine Music & Media named it a "jazzy soul laden jam, flexing rhythm and blues muscle. Its warmth harks back to the '70s."

Andy Beevers from Music Week gave "Hey Mr. D.J." a score of four out of five, complimenting it as an "excellent catchy soul track". He also remarked that it's "already selling like hotcakes on import". John Kilgo from The Network Forty felt that "sultry and smooth, Zhane' brings a fresh tasting low groove that's nicely reminiscent of a relaxing, flavorful '70s summer tune." He noted that "their voices blend together like a shake from an ice cream parlor", and "proudly sing their tribute [to] record-spinners the world over. They do so without missing a beat on this exciting debut." People Magazine stated that "with a funky, old-school groove and light-as-air harmonizing", the song "jumps to the joys of getting down and having fun." Jonathan Bernstein from Spin commented, "I remember this," I said, awash in a rosy glow of nostalgia triggered by Zhané's undulating 'Hey Mr. D.J.' "1982, a year rich in classic soul singles." Then the rap kicked in, signifying that this was no chestnut, rather an irresistible instant standard."

== Chart performance ==
"I wrote that song in my bedroom while sitting on the floor. I remember presenting it to Kay Gee. I told him I had this song called 'Hey Mr. D.J.' I told him it reminded me of when I had block parties on my block back in Brooklyn. When I sang it to him, he laughed at me. [laughs] He thought it was a joke. But we recorded it, and everyone seemed to love it. So imagine that 'Hey Mr. D.J.' was a hit, there's this group that no one has ever seen before, there's no video for the song, the album isn't done, and we hadn't sign to a record label for a full length album yet. There was a bidding war for us."

— Renee Neufville talking to WaxPoetics about how the song was made.

"Hey Mr. D.J." was a moderate success on the charts on several continents, peaking at number two on both the RPM Dance/Urban chart in Canada and the Billboard Dance Club Songs chart in the United States. In Europe, it made it to the top 30 in Austria, Germany, and the United Kingdom, where it peaked at numbers 27, 29, and 26, respectively. On the German Singles Chart, the song spent a total of 13 weeks. In the UK, it reached its peak in its first week at the UK Singles Chart, on September 5, 1993.

On the Eurochart Hot 100, "Hey Mr. D.J." peaked at number 62 in the final week of December 1993, after debuting on the chart at number 95 on September 18 when it charted in the UK. On the European Dance Radio Chart, it peaked at number 11 in October 1993. In North America, the song was a huge hit, peaking at number six on the US Billboard Hot 100 and number five on the Cash Box Top 100. In Oceania, "Hey Mr. D.J." reached numbers nine and 20 in Australia and New Zealand, respectively. The single earned a gold record in the US, after a sale of 500,000 units.

== Music video ==
A music video was produced to promote "Hey Mr. D.J.". It was directed by Peter Allen, and features Zhané performing the song at a club party with a D.J. playing the music for a dancing crowd. In between, the group is also seen performing the song in a park. The opening and ending of the video shows group members Renée Neufville and Jean Norris arriving or leaving the party. Rottin Razkals member Fam is also featured. DJ Enuff and Benzino makes cameo appearances.

== Impact and legacy ==
Retrospectively, AllMusic editor Jose F. Promis complimented the song as a "sleek slice of earthy, sophisticated soul that stands as one of the best R&B hits of the '90s." In June 1994, "Hey Mr. D.J." won one of ASCAP's R&B Music Awards. Same year, it was nominated in the category for Favorite Song at the Kids' Choice Award, but lost to "Whoomp! (There It Is)" by Tag Team. In 2006, the song was voted number nine on website Slant Magazine's list of the "100 Greatest Dance Songs". Five years later, in 2011, it was voted number 86 in their list of "The 100 Best Singles of the 1990s". They wrote, "Straight-up, no-bullshit dance music. The duo pronounced "Jah-Nay" let the slack groove thang take you away to a place where the DJ will keep playing that song all night." In 2012, Complex featured it in their list of "The Best 90s R&B Songs". A Complex editor, Brendan Frederick, called it "a simple ode to dancing the night away to your favorite song", and a "summertime party anthem".

In 2017, American entertainment company BuzzFeed ranked it number 45 in their list of "The 101 Greatest Dance Songs Of the '90s", writing, "Great harmonies, chill vibe, rap bridge; all the things you needed to make a perfect early-'90s R&B dance song." In a 2019 retrospective review, Daryl McIntosh from Albumism wrote that Kay Gee's beat on the track "provided a sound reminiscent of late '70s disco band Chic, that, together with the perfectly complementary vocals, created a euphoria of modern funk". In 2020, Slant Magazine ranked it number 22 in their list of "The 100 Best Dance Songs of All Time". An editor said, "Still, no one nailed the formula quite like Zhané did with this velvet midnight blue floor-filler."

=== Accolades ===
Year	Publisher	Country	Accolade	Rank
1994	Kids' Choice Award	United States	"Favorite Song"	nomination
1994	ASCAP	United States	"ASCAP's R&B Music Awards"	*
1995	BMI	United States	"BMI Pop Awards"	*
2005	Süddeutsche Zeitung	Germany	"1020 Songs 1955-2005"	*
2006	Slant Magazine	United States	"100 Greatest Dance Songs"	9
2011	Slant Magazine	United States	"The 100 Best Singles of the 1990s"	86
2012	Complex	United States	"The Best 90s R&B Songs"	44
2017	BuzzFeed	United States	"The 101 Greatest Dance Songs Of the '90s"	45
2019	Billboard	United States	"Billboard's Top Songs of the '90s"	489
2020	Slant Magazine	United States	"The 100 Best Dance Songs of All Time"	22

(*) indicates the list is unordered.

== Track listings ==
- 12-inch vinyl
1. "Hey Mr. D.J." (Maurice's club mix) – 6:37
2. "Hey Mr. D.J." (Maurice's cub mix with rap) – 6:37
3. "Hey Mr. D.J." (original mix) – 4:20
4. "Hey Mr. D.J." (Mo's Hey D.J. Work This dub) – 6:25
5. "Hey Mr. D.J." (UBQ's Underground dub) – 6:45
6. "Hey Mr. D.J." (Moapella) – 2:38
- CD maxi-single
1. "Hey Mr. D.J." (original mix) – 4:20
2. "Hey Mr. D.J." (7-inch remix) – 3:54
3. "Hey Mr. D.J." (7-inch remix with rap) – 3:52
4. "Hey Mr. D.J." (Maurice's club mix) – 6:39
5. "Hey Mr. D.J." (Maurice's club mix with rap) – 6:39
6. "Hey Mr. D.J." (Mo's Hey D.J. Work This dub) – 6:25

== Charts ==
=== Weekly charts ===
Chart (1993–1994)	Peak position
Australia (ARIA)	9
Austria (Ö3 Austria Top 40)	27
Canada Dance/Urban (RPM)	2
Europe (Eurochart Hot 100)	62
Europe (European Dance Radio)	11
France (SNEP)	32
Germany (GfK)	29
Netherlands (Dutch Tip 40 Tipparade)	18
Netherlands (Single Top 100 Tipparade)	5
New Zealand (Recorded Music NZ)	20
Switzerland (Schweizer Hitparade)	42
UK Singles (Official Charts)	26
UK Dance (Music Week)	2
UK Club Chart (Music Week)	4
US Billboard Hot 100	6
US Dance Club Play (Billboard)	2
US Hot R&B Singles (Billboard)	3
US Maxi-Singles Sales (Billboard)	1
US Top 40/Mainstream (Billboard)	16
US Top 40/Rhythm-Crossover (Billboard)	2
US Cash Box Top 100	5

=== Year-end charts ===
Chart (1993)	Position
Canada Dance/Urban (RPM)	12
UK Club Chart (Music Week)	83
US Billboard Hot 100	64
US Dance Club Play (Billboard)	25
US Hot R&B Singles (Billboard)	19
US Maxi-Singles Sales (Billboard)	1

Chart (1994)	Position
Australia (ARIA)	48
US Cash Box Top 100	48

== Certifications ==
Region	Certification	Certified units/sales
Australia (ARIA)	Gold	35,000^{^}
New Zealand (RMNZ)	Gold	15,000^{‡}
United States (RIAA)	Gold	500,000
^{^} Shipments figures based on certification alone.^{‡} Sales+streaming figures based on certification alone.

== Release history ==
Region	Date	Format(s)	Label(s)	Ref.
United States	August 4, 1993	12-inch vinyl; cassette	Flavor Unit; Epic	
United Kingdom	August 30, 1993	12-inch vinyl; CD; cassette	Flavor Unit; Epic	
Australia	November 8, 1993	CD; cassette	Flavor Unit; Epic	
