= Nothing to Lose (soundtrack) =

Nothing to Lose: Music from and Inspired by the Motion Picture

Soundtrack album by Various artists
- Released: July 1, 1997
- Recorded: 1996–1997
- Genres: Hip hop; R&B
- Length: 70:33
- Labels: Tommy Boy; Warner Bros. Records
- Producer: Various artists

Singles from Nothing to Lose: Music from and Inspired by the Motion Picture
- 1. "Go Stetsa I" Released: August 12, 1987; 2. "C U When U Get There" Released: June 17, 1997; 3. "Not Tonight" Released: June 24, 1997; 4. "It's Alright" Released: June 28, 1997; 5. "Put the Monkey In It" Released: September 1998

Professional ratings
Review scores
| Source | Rating |
|---|---|
| AllMusic | 3/5 stars |

Nothing to Lose: Music from and Inspired by the Motion Picture is the soundtrack to the 1997 comedy film, Nothing to Lose. It was released on July 1, 1997 through Tommy Boy Records. The soundtrack was very successful, peaking at #12 on the Billboard 200 and #5 on the Top R&B/Hip-Hop Albums and was certified gold on September 3, 1997. Two singles also found success, Lil' Kim's "Not Tonight" went to #6 on the Billboard Hot 100 and was certified platinum, while Coolio's "C U When U Get There" went to #12 on the Billboard Hot 100 and was certified gold.

== Track listing ==
| No. | Title | Producer(s) | Length |
|---|---|---|---|
| 1. | "Nothin' to Lose" (Naughty Live) (Naughty by Nature) | Naughty by Nature | 3:39 |
| 2. | "Not Tonight" (Ladies Night Remix) (Lil' Kim featuring Left Eye, Da Brat, Missy Elliott and Angie Martinez) | Rashad Smith | 4:24 |
| 3. | "C U When U Get There" (Coolio featuring 40 Thevz) | Romeo | 4:38 |
| 4. | "Put the Monkey In It" (Dat Nigga Daz & Soopafly) | Dat Nigga Daz; Soopafly | 4:05 |
| 5. | "Thug Paradise" (Capone-n-Noreaga featuring Tragedy Khadafi) | D-Moet | 3:30 |
| 6. | "Way 2 Saucy" (Mac & A.K. featuring Mac Mall) | Mac & A.K. | 4:23 |
| 7. | "Get Down With Me" (Amari featuring Buckshot) | William Stewart | 4:01 |
| 8. | "Poppin' That Fly" (DJ Clark Kent Remix) (Oran "Juice" Jones featuring Stu Large and Camp Lo) | Clark Kent | 4:12 |
| 9. | "Route 69" (Quad City DJ's) | Quad City DJ's | 4:18 |
| 10. | "Hit 'Em Up" (Master P featuring TRU and Mercedes) | Craig B | 3:42 |
| 11. | "Everlasting" (OutKast) | OutKast | 3:42 |
| 12. | "In a Magazine" (911 featuring Queen Pen) | Teddy Riley | 4:29 |
| 13. | "Not Tonight" (8Ball & MJG) | Smoked Out Productions | 3:41 |
| 14. | "It's Alright" (Queen Latifah) | Big Baby | 4:45 |
| 15. | "What's Going On" (Black Caesar) | B.O.G.; Rashad Coes | 4:07 |
| 16. | "Go Stetsa I" (Stetsasonic) | Stetsasonic | 4:35 |
| 17. | "Crazy Maze" (Des'ree) | Peter Lord; V. Jeffrey Smith | 3:55 |
| Total length: | | | 1:10:33 |

== Charts ==
=== Weekly charts ===
| Chart (1997) | Peak position |
|---|---|
| US Billboard 200 | 12 |
| US Top R&B/Hip-Hop Albums (Billboard) | 5 |

=== Year-end charts ===
| Chart (1997) | Position |
|---|---|
| US Billboard 200 | 179 |
| US Top R&B/Hip-Hop Albums (Billboard) | 87 |

== Certifications ==
| Region | Certification | Certified units/sales |
|---|---|---|
| United States (RIAA) | Gold | 500,000^{^} |
^{^} Shipments figures based on certification alone.
