= Zhané =

R&B duo from Philadelphia

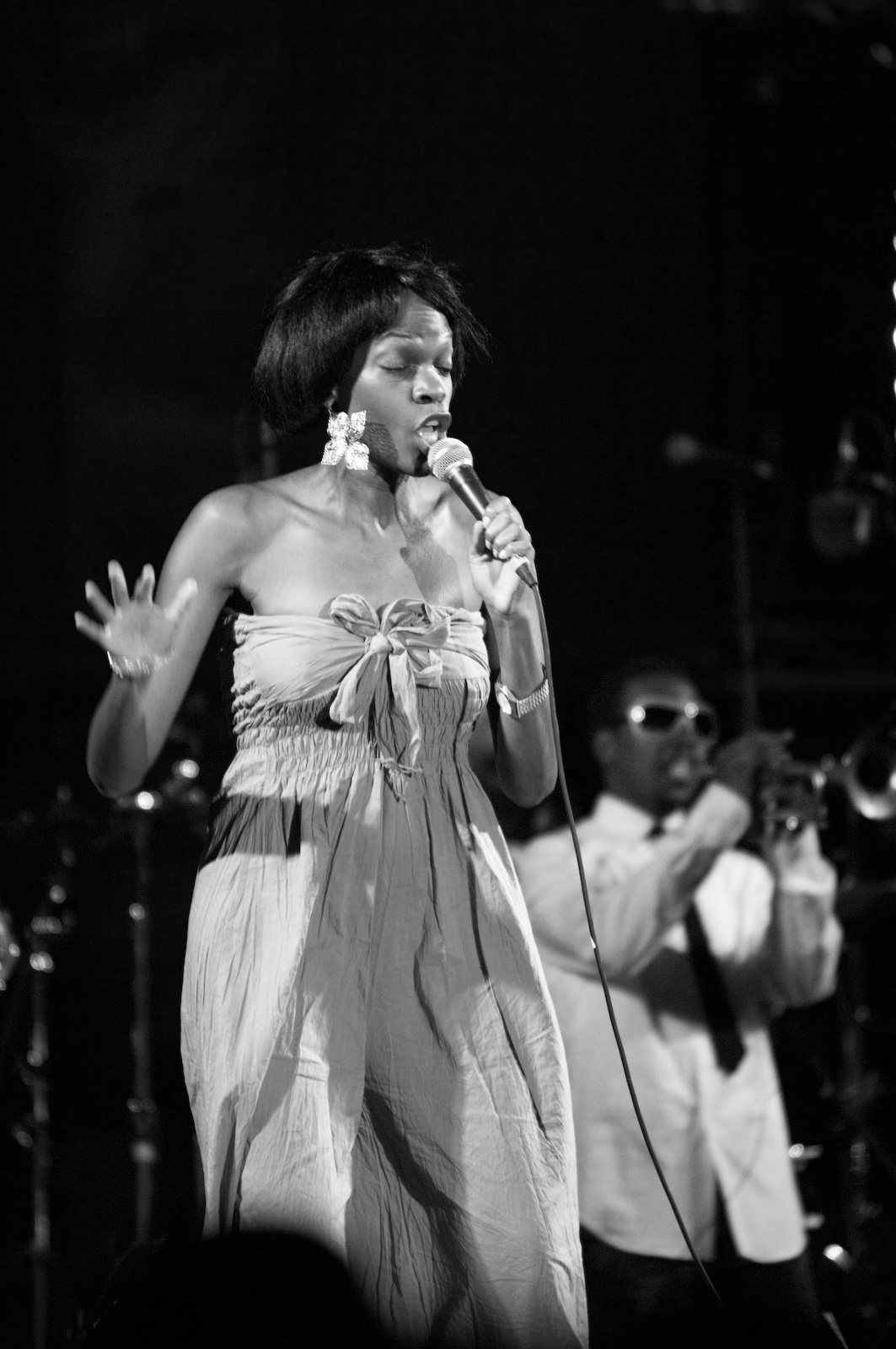
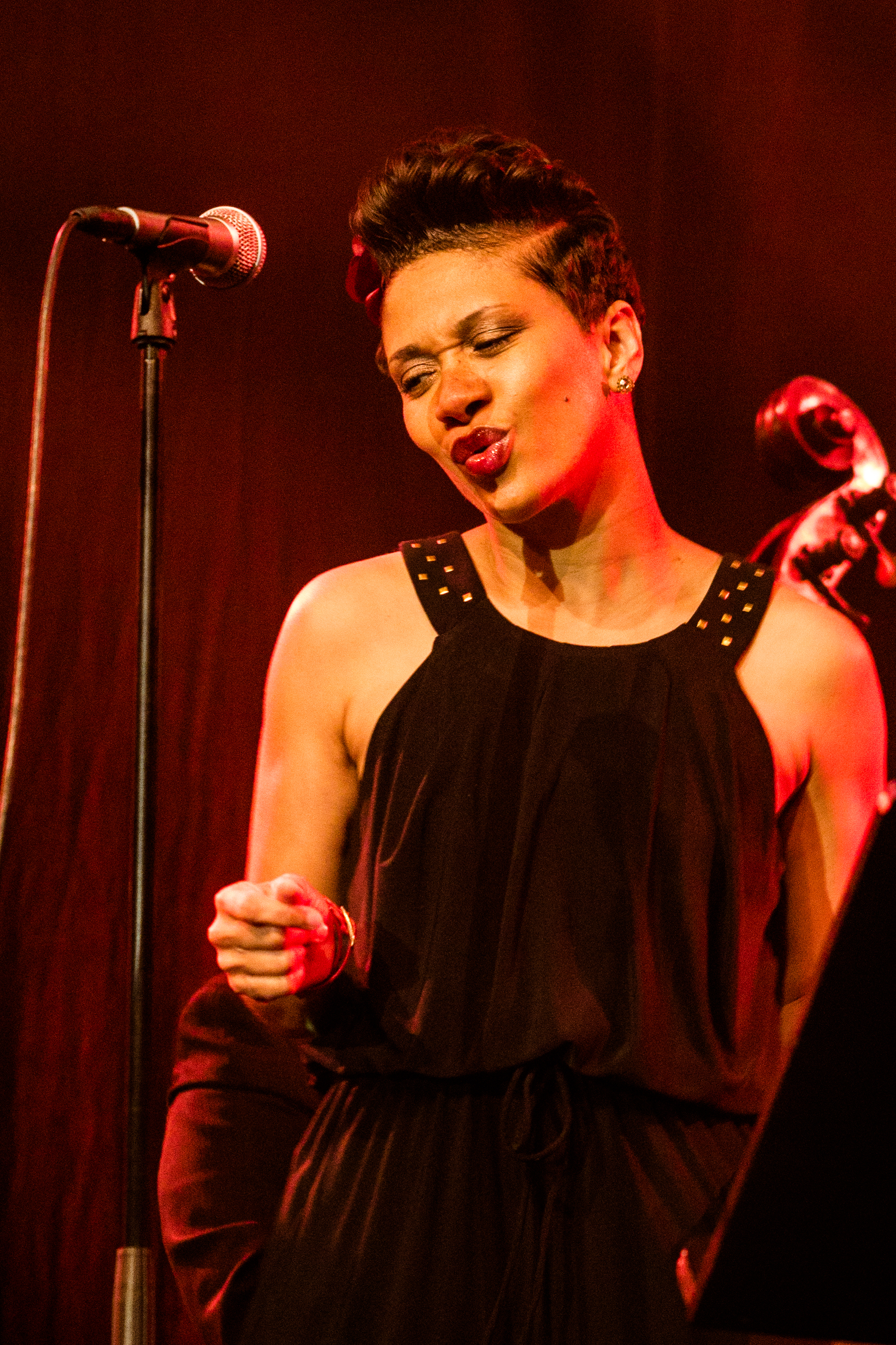
- Neufville (left) & Norris (right)

Background information
- Origin: Philadelphia, Pennsylvania, U.S.
- Genres: R&B
- Years active: 1990–1999
- Labels: Flavor Unit; Epic; Motown
- Past members: Renée Neufville; Jean Norris-Baylor

Zhané (/ʒɑːˈneɪ/ zhah-NAY) was an American R&B duo of Renée Neufville and Jean Norris-Baylor, best known for their 1993 hit "Hey Mr. D.J.", which reached No. 6 on the U.S. Billboard Hot 100. Other popular hits include "Groove Thang" (U.S. No. 17) and minor hit "Sending My Love", both released in 1994. The group was part of Queen Latifah's Flavor Unit collective.

== Biography ==
=== Beginnings ===
According to Jean Norris, "We added a 'Z' for a little flavor and we came up with Zhané." Prior to their breakthrough, Norris and Neufville made their recording debut as background vocalists on "Ring My Bell" - the second single from the 1991 DJ Jazzy Jeff & the Fresh Prince album, Homebase.

=== Breakthrough & Pronounced Jah-Nay ===
Given a high-profile spot on the all-star compilation Roll wit tha Flava as their first recording opportunity, Zhané came away with one of the hip-hop party anthems of all time, "Hey, Mr. D.J." After meeting Naughty by Nature member Kay Gee, Zhané (then credited as Jhané) impressed the producer enough to go right into the studio to record for Roll wit tha Flava. When "Hey, Mr. D.J." was released as a separate single as well, it hit number six on the pop charts and earned the group a contract with Motown in 1994. Their debut album, Pronounced Jah-Nay, produced two further Top 40 hits ("Groove Thang," "Sending My Love") and went gold by the end of the year; it achieved platinum status two years later. Zhané kept busy during 1995–1996 with spots on tracks by Busta Rhymes and De La Soul as well as new songs of their own on the NFL Jams and NBA 50th Anniversary compilations and the soundtracks to Higher Learning and A Low Down Dirty Shame — the latter, "Shame," became their fourth Top 40 hit. After the success of their debut album Pronounced Jah-Nay, the duo appeared with TLC, SWV, Jade, En Vogue and others on the single "Freedom (Theme from Panther)" from the soundtrack to the 1995 Mario Van Peebles film Panther.

=== Saturday Night ===
Norris and Neufville released the follow-up album Saturday Night in 1997, co-produced by Kay Gee, Eddie F., and themselves. The release featured the hit single "Request Line." A remix with different lyrics and raps by Queen Latifah followed. It peaked just outside the Top 40.

=== Group dissolution and solo projects ===
Since the group's dissolution, Jean Norris married musician Marcus Baylor, perhaps best known as the drummer in jazz fusion ensemble, the Yellowjackets from 2000 to 2010. Jean Baylor released the solo album Testimony: My Life in 2007 and a contemporary Christmas album entitled Light Up the World in November 2011. She later formed an R&B/jazz duo with her husband named The Baylor Project and they released their debut album The Baylor Project (The Journey) in February 2017. In November 2017, the duo received two 60th Grammy Awards-nominations under Best Jazz Vocal Album and Best Traditional R&B Performance.

Neufville hosted an early live internet series called 88 Soul where guests included well-known R&B/Neo-Soul artists such as Jill Scott, Carl Thomas, Kelis, and Joe. She later contributed to albums and videos by the likes of India.Arie, Will Downing, Heather Headley, Leela James and Aaliyah amongst others. She became involved in Roy Hargrove's RH Factor project and figured prominently on the 2006 release Distractions playing keyboards and contributing lead vocals.

== Discography ==
=== Studio albums ===
Year	Album details	Peak chart positions						Certifications (sales thresholds)
Year	Album details	US	US R&B	AUS	CAN	FRA	UK	Certifications (sales thresholds)
1994	Pronounced Jah-Nay: Released: February 15, 1994; Label: Motown; Formats: CD, cassette	37	8	50	44	—	89	RIAA: Platinum
1997	Saturday Night: Released: April 22, 1997; Label: Motown; Formats: CD, cassette	41	8	—	90	26	52	
"—" denotes a recording that did not chart or was not released in that territory.

=== Singles ===
Year	Title	Peak chart positions											Certifications	Album
Year	Title	US Hot 100	US R&B	US Dance	AUS	AUT	CAN	FRA	GER	NZ	SWI	UK	Certifications	Album
1993	"Hey Mr. D.J."	6	3	2	9	27	2	32	29	20	42	26	RIAA: Gold; ARIA: Gold; RMNZ: Gold	Roll wit tha Flava / Pronounced Jah-Nay
1994	"Groove Thang"	17	2	13	17	—	3	42	99	7	—	34		Pronounced Jah-Nay
1994	"Sending My Love"	40	5	—	126	—	—	—	—	—	—	—		Pronounced Jah-Nay
1994	"Vibe"	119	33	—	142	—	—	—	—	—	—	67		Pronounced Jah-Nay
1994	"Shame"	28	12	46	133	—	79	—	—	50	—	66		A Low Down Dirty Shame (soundtrack)
1994	"You're Sorry Now"	—	38	—	—	—	—	—	—	—	—	—		Pronounced Jah-Nay
1997	"Request Line"	39	9	—	—	—	—	—	—	12	—	22		Saturday Night
1997	"Saturday Night" ^{[A]}	—	69	—	—	—	—	—	—	—	—	—		Saturday Night
1997	"Crush"	106	24	—	—	—	—	—	—	—	—	44		Saturday Night
"—" denotes a recording that did not chart or was not released in that territory.

Note

^{A} Did not chart on the Hot R&B/Hip-Hop Songs chart (Billboard rules at the time prevented album cuts from charting). Chart peak listed represents the Hot R&B/Hip-Hop Airplay chart.

==== Featured singles ====
Year	Title	Artist	Peak chart positions					Album
Year	Title	Artist	US	US R&B	AUS	NZ	UK	Album
1995	"By Your Side"	Various Artists						Higher Learning (soundtrack)
1995	"Freedom (Theme from Panther)"	Various Artists	45	18	—	—	—	Panther (soundtrack)
1996	"It's a Party"	Busta Rhymes	52	27	—	34	23	The Coming
1996	"When the Cheering Stops"	AZ, Ray Buchanan, Scott Galbraith						NFL Jams
1997	"4 More"	De La Soul	—	—	—	—	52	Stakes Is High
1998	"Things Won't Change"	Alias LJ						Alias LJ
1999	"Jamboree"	Naughty by Nature	10	4	74	22	51	Nineteen Naughty Nine: Nature's Fury
"—" denotes a recording that did not chart or was not released in that territory.
