= U.N.I.T.Y. =

Single by Queen Latifah

from the album Black Reign
- Released: November 9, 1993
- Recorded: 1993
- Genre: Hip-hop
- Length: 4:14 (censored version); 4:11 (lp version)
- Label: Motown
- Songwriters: Dana Owens; Kier Gist
- Producer: KayGee

Queen Latifah singles chronology
"Buddy" (1989)	"U.N.I.T.Y." (1993)	"Just Another Day..." (1994)

Audio sample
- file; help

Music video
- "U.N.I.T.Y." on YouTube

"U.N.I.T.Y." is a song by American hip-hop artist Queen Latifah from her third studio album, Black Reign (1993). The single was released by Motown on November 9, 1993, in the United States, and on January 6, 1994, in the United Kingdom. "U.N.I.T.Y." focused on confronting disrespect of women in society, addressing issues of street harassment, domestic violence, and slurs against women in hip-hop culture. The chorus of the song interpolates "Unity" by Desmond Dekker.

Because of its message, many radio and television stations would play the song without censoring the words "bitch" and "hoes", which appear often in the lyrics, particularly the chorus and the line, "who you callin' a bitch?!" that ends each verse of the song. The song samples "Message from the Inner City" by the Crusaders, a Houston-based jazz group. The song was also featured on Living Single, Latifah's series which began the same year.

There is a second version of the song, titled "U.N.I.T.Y. (Queen Ruff Neck Boot)", which also had notable airplay. This version has a similar beat to the album version, replacing much of the jazz sample with a hip-hop beat, and can be found as a "clean" version on 20th Century Masters: The Millennium Collection: The Best of Queen Latifah and Hip Hop: Gold.

"U.N.I.T.Y." won the 1995 Grammy Award for Best Rap Solo Performance. The song remains Latifah's biggest hit single in the United States to date, and her only song to reach the Top 30 of the Billboard Hot 100. In 2022, Pitchfork magazine placed the song on the 95th place in the list of the 250 best songs of the 90s.

== Critical reception ==
Andy Beevers from UK magazine Music Week gave the song three out of five, writing, "New Jersey's foremost female rapper delivers another fierce anti-sexist volley over a haunting funk rhythm. The track is doing well in the US, but it will need to pick up more radio play here."

== Chart performance ==
The single gained commercial success, peaking at No. 23 on the US Billboard Hot 100, but was most successful on the Billboard Hot Rap Singles chart, peaking at No. 2. It also peaked at No. 7 on the Billboard Hot R&B/Hip-Hop Songs chart.

== Music video ==
The accompanying music video for "U.N.I.T.Y." was directed by Mark Gerard who also directed Latifah's video for "Just Another Day...". In the video, Latifah rides a motorcycle, in dedication to her brother Lance, who was killed in a motorcycle accident in 1992. The key she catches in the beginning and wears throughout the video is the ignition key to Lance's motorcycle. The video also features a cameo by fellow East Orange, New Jersey rap group Naughty by Nature. It was filmed largely in front of the now demolished Hayes Homes Housing Projects in Newark.

== Charts ==
=== Weekly charts ===
Chart (1993–1994)	Peak position
Netherlands (Dutch Single Tip)	15
UK Singles (Official Charts)	74
UK Dance (Music Week)	18
US Billboard Hot 100	23
US Dance Singles Sales (Billboard)	1
US Hot R&B/Hip-Hop Songs (Billboard)	7
US R&B/Hip-Hop Airplay (Billboard)	11
US Hot Rap Songs (Billboard)	2
US Radio Songs (Billboard)	24
US Rhythmic Airplay (Billboard)	13
US Cash Box Top 100	24

=== Year-end charts ===
Chart (1994)	Position
US Billboard Hot 100	82
US Hot R&B/Hip-Hop Songs (Billboard)	50

== Remix ==
A remix version, known as the "Big Titty Remix", can be found on her "Just Another Day..." single.

== In other media ==
An excerpt from the music video was featured during the closing credits of a Season 1 episode of Latifah's sitcom, Living Single, titled "U.N.I.T.Y. (a.k.a. Five Card Stud)" after the song. The episode itself dealt with the issue of disrespect towards women that the song reflects upon, in which supporting main character Kyle Barker (T. C. Carson)—a friend of Latifah's character, Khadijah James—struggles with whether to stand up to a co-worker (guest star Bobby Hosea) who made disparaging comments about Kyle and Khadijah's friend, Regine Hunter (Kim Fields), following said colleague's date with the latter.

The song is played towards the end of the 1996 film Girls Town and plays during the film's credits.
