= Black Hand Side =

Single by Queen Latifah

from the album Black Reign
- Released: 1994
- Genre: Hip-hop; R&B
- Label: Motown
- Songwriters: Queen Latifah; Sidney Reynolds
- Producer: S.I.D.

Queen Latifah singles chronology
| "Just Another Day..." (1994) | "Black Hand Side" (1994) | "Rough..." (1994) |

"Black Hand Side" is a song by the American hip-hop artist, Queen Latifah, released as a single in 1994, from her third album, Black Reign (1993). The song was written by Latifah and Sidney "S.I.D." Reynolds, and samples "Hello It's Me" by The Isley Brothers. The music video was directed by the critically acclaimed F. Gary Gray, who also directed the music videos for Ice Cube's "It Was a Good Day" and TLC's "Waterfalls".

== Formats and track listings ==
- American CD/Cassette Maxi Single/12 Inch Vinyl Single
1. Black Hand Side - Al's Remix (Remixed by Al "Baby Jesus" Eaton)
2. Black Hand Side - Jay's Lab Groove (Remixed by Jay Wright)
3. Black Hand Side - A cappella
4. Weekend Love (LP Version) (Featuring Tony Rebel)
5. Weekend Love (Instrumental)

== Lyric change ==
In the LP version of the song, Latifah says "Black Reign 1993, I'd like to welcome you to this album." The album was released in 1993. When "Black Hand Side" was released as a single in 1994, the lyric was changed to "Black Reign 1994, I'd like to welcome you to this album" for the video and single.

== Chart ==
| Chart (1994) | Peak position |
|---|---|
| US Hot Rap Songs (Billboard) | 20 |
| US Maxi-Singles Sales (Billboard) | 18 |
