= Black Reign (album) =

Studio album by Queen Latifah
- Released: November 16, 1993
- Recorded: November 1992 – September 1993
- Studio: Skyline; Giant; Unique, New York City
- Genre: East Coast hip-hop; vocal jazz
- Length: 55:53
- Label: Motown
- Producer: Sidney "S.I.D." Reynolds; Tony Dofat; KayGee; Queen Latifah

Queen Latifah chronology
Nature of a Sista' (1991)	Black Reign (1993)	Order in the Court (1998)

Singles from Black Reign
- 1. "U.N.I.T.Y." Released: November 9, 1993; 2. "Just Another Day..." Released: December 23, 1993; 3. "Black Hand Side / Weekend Love" Released: 1994; 4. "Rough... / I Can't Understand" Released: September 27, 1994

Black Reign is the third studio album by American rapper Queen Latifah, released in 1993. Black Reign was her most successful album up to that point, peaking at number 60 on the Billboard 200. The album also peaked at number fifteen on the Top R&B/Hip-Hop Albums. The album sold in excess of 500,000 copies, achieving gold status.

== Critical reception ==
Professional ratings
Review scores
Source	Rating
AllMusic	4/5 stars
Robert Christgau	(3-star Honorable Mention)
The Encyclopedia of Popular Music	3/5 stars
NME	7/10
The New Rolling Stone Album Guide	3/5 stars
Select	2/5 medals
The Source	3.5/5 stars
Spin Alternative Record Guide	7/10

Trouser Press wrote that Latifah "rhymes over bottom-booming jeep beats and sings to sweet soul, dancehall and, in the case of 'Winki’s Theme,' a song for her late brother, a live jazz quartet." The New York Times wrote: "As one of hip-hop's true vocal virtuosos, Queen Latifah tosses off articulate, quick-changing syncopations when she raps, slipping in and out of a Jamaican accent and singing melodic choruses in a sweet, strong voice."

== Influence ==
The album was a major influence for young adult novelist Jason Reynolds, who was inspired to start writing poetry when he discovered Black Reign at nine years old.

== Track listing ==
Black Reign
No.	Title	Producer	Length
1.	"Black Hand Side"	S.I.D.	3:22
2.	"Listen 2 Me"	Tony Dofat	4:43
3.	"I Can't Understand"	Tony Dofat	3:50
4.	"Rough... (featuring Treach, Heavy D and KRS-One)"	Tony Dofat	5:04
5.	"4 the D.J.'s (Interlude)"	S.I.D.	1:38
6.	"Bring the Flavor"	Tony Dofat	3:25
7.	"Coochie Bang..."	S.I.D.	3:46
8.	"Superstar"	S.I.D.	3:56
9.	"No Work"	Kay Gee	2:51
10.	"Just a Flow (Interlude)"	S.I.D.	1:30
11.	"Just Another Day..."	S.I.D.	4:29
12.	"U.N.I.T.Y."	Kay Gee & Mufi	4:11
13.	"Weekend Love (featuring Tony Rebel)"	Kay Gee	4:09
14.	"Mood Is Right"	S.I.D.	3:30
15.	"Winki's Theme"	Queen Latifah	5:29
Total length:			55:53

== Music videos ==
- "U.N.I.T.Y."
- "Just Another Day"
- "Black Hand Side"
- "I Can't Understand"
- "Weekend Love"

== Certifications ==
Region	Certification	Certified units/sales
United States (RIAA)	Gold	503,000
