= Paper (Queen Latifah song) =

Single by Queen Latifah

from the album Order in the Court
- Released: May 5, 1998
- Recorded: 1997
- Studio: Chung King Studios, New York City
- Genre: R&B, hip-hop
- Length: 4:00
- Label: Motown Records
- Songwriter(s): Paco Michel, D. Owens, Norman Whitfield, Barrett Strong
- Producer(s): Pras Michel, Jerry Duplessis

Queen Latifah singles chronology
"Bananas (Who You Gonna Call?)" (1998)	"Paper" (1998)

Music video
- "Paper" on YouTube

"Paper" is the second song of a double-A sided single from the American hip-hop artist Queen Latifah's 1998 album, Order in the Court. "Paper" is one of the first Queen Latifah songs that does not include any rapping. Essentially, "Paper" is a cover of Norman Whitfield and Barrett Strong's "I Heard It Through the Grapevine" with significantly altered lyrics. The song features Pras and background vocals by Jazz-a-Belle.

== Production ==
"Paper" was produced by Pras of the Fugees and Jerry Duplessis. The song was recorded at Chung King Studios in New York City.
