= Lakim Shabazz =

American rapper

- Also known as: M.C. La Kim
- Born: Larry Welsh; 12 December 1968 (age 57); Newark, New Jersey, US
- Origin: Newark, New Jersey, US
- Genres: East Coast hip hop; conscious hip hop
- Occupation: Rapper
- Years active: 1988–present
- Label: Tuff City Records

Larry Welsh, also known as Lakim Shabazz, is a former hip-hop emcee artist who was one of the founding members of the original version of the Flavor Unit crew. His stage name refers to the so-called Lost Tribe of Shabazz, which is based on the teachings of Wallace Fard Muhammad.

== Career ==
As an artist signed with Tuff City, Lakim first gained recognition when he provided vocals for the 45 King's "The 900 Number". Further collaboration with the 45 King was to follow with the EP titled The Red, the Black, the Green. Then later, in 1988, his debut album Pure Righteousness was released as an introduction-style album with a "the 45 King presents" moniker on the cover sleeve. This album was relatively well received, and has become an iconic release of the period in hip hop where the Nation of Gods and Earths style of the late 1980s/early 1990s is concerned. Shabazz released two albums, recorded for Aaron Fuchs's Tuff City Records, featuring production by The 45 King, and his militant lyrics were predominantly about his love of the Nation of Islam.

In 2015, Shabazz was featured on the Shady Corps' track "Lost Souls".

== Influences ==
In an interview with AllHipHop, Lakim said, "I came up listening to Cold Crush, Treacherous Three, Jazzy Five. A lot of my influences were, like, Grandmaster Flash, Kool Moe Dee; then later on in life, you had Rakim, Kane".

== Discography ==
=== Singles ===
- "Pure Righteousness" (1988)
- "Black is Back" (1988)

=== Albums ===
- Pure Righteousness (1988)
- The Lost Tribe of Shabazz (1990) (No. 78 on the Top R&B/Hip-Hop Albums)
