= Flavor Unit =

American emcee and DJ crew

The Flavor Unit is a crew of emcees and DJs from New York City and Northern New Jersey. It is now known as the Unit. The original version of the crew centered on producer the 45 King. It was Mark's connections to radio personalities DJ Red Alert and DJ Chuck Chillout that initially got the crew noticed, but the original members also all had formidable rhyme skills and wrote streetwise lyrics. Eventually, Queen Latifah took over the name and it became her umbrella organization. Flavor Unit Management is run by Latifah, one of the original members of the Flavor Unit, and Shakim Compere. Past management clients were Monica, Outkast, Faith Evans, Total, SWV, Almighty RSO (a group featuring Ray Dog, better known today as Benzino), Groove Theory, Monifah, Gina Thompson, LL Cool J, Zhané, Donell Jones, and Naughty By Nature.

== Members ==
Names marked with an asterisk denote artists who were managed by Flavor Unit but were not part of the original crew.

- Apache (deceased)
- Black Sheep*
- Channel Live*
- Chill Rob G
- The 45 King (deceased)
- Freddie Foxxx*
- Lakim Shabazz
- Latee
- DJ Cee Justice
- Lord Alibaski
- Naughty by Nature*
- Nikki D*
- Queen Latifah
- Rowdy Rahz*
- Storm P*
- Zhané*

== Discography ==
- 1990: The 45 King presents The Flavor Unit (Tuff City)
- 1993: Roll wit tha Flava (Epic/SME)
- 2000: Flavor Unit 10th Anniversary (Flavor Unit Records)
- 2000: The Takeover (Warner Bros.)
- 2002: The Unit: 100% Hater Proof (Flavor Unit Records)
