= Carl Thomas discography =

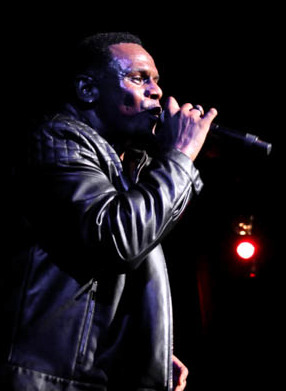
- Thomas in 2014.
- Studio albums: 4
- EPs: 1
- Singles: 11

American singer Carl Thomas entered the music business after being discovered by rapper Puff Daddy, who signed him to Bad Boy Records, a then-imprint of Arista Records in 1997. Thomas became best known for his second single, the song "I Wish," which peaked at number 20 on the US Billboard Hot 100 in 2000 and preceded his debut studio album, Emotional (2000). The album peaked at number nine on the US Billboard 200 and was certified Platinum by the Recording Industry Association of America (RIAA) on December 11, 2000. "Emotional," the album's third and final single, became Thomas's second top ten hit on the US Hot R&B/Hip-Hop Songs chart.

Thomas's second album Let's Talk About It was released in March 2004. It debuted and peaked at number four on the Billboard 200 and was later certified Gold by the RIAA. The album produced three singles, including "She Is" featuring rapper LL Cool J and "Make It Alright," the latter of which peaked at number 33 on the Hot R&B/Hip-Hop Songs chart. Following his departure from Bad Boy, Thomas released his So Much Better in May 2007 through a one-off deal with Jheryl Busby's Umbrella Recordings and producer Mike City's Unsung Entertainment. Chiefly produced by City, the album became his third consecutive album to peak at number two on the US Top R&B/Hip-Hop Albums chart, though it also marked his first project to miss the top ten of the Billboard 200.

Conquer, the singer's fourth studio album, was issued by Verve Forecast Records in December 2011. It reached number 21 on the Top R&B/Hip-Hop Albums, but failed to chart significantly elsewhere. "Don't Kiss Me," the album's first and final single, peaked at number 52 on the Hot R&B/Hip-Hop Songs chart. In January 2025, Thomas' first extended play, was released by Music of the Sea.

== Albums ==
List of studio albums, with selected details
Title	Album details	Peak positions		Certifications
Title	Album details	US	US R&B	Certifications
Emotional	Released: April 18, 2000; Label: Bad Boy; Formats: CD, digital download	9	2	RIAA: Platinum
Let's Talk About It	Released: March 23, 2004; Label: Bad Boy; Formats: CD, digital download	4	2	RIAA: Gold
So Much Better	Released: May 30, 2007; Label: Umbrella, Unsung; Formats: CD, digital download	25	2	
Conquer	Released: December 6, 2011; Label: Verve Forecast; Formats: CD, digital download	165	21	

== EPs ==
List of extended plays, with selected details
Title	Extended play details
Explosive	Released: January 31, 2025; Label: Music of the Sea; Formats: Digital download

== Singles ==
=== As lead artist ===
List of singles, with selected chart positions
Title	Year	Peak chart positions		Album
Title	Year	US	US R&B	Album
"Summer Rain"	2000	80	18	Emotional
"I Wish"	2000	20	1	Emotional
"Emotional"	2000	47	8	Emotional
"She Is" (featuring LL Cool J)	2004	—	56	Let's Talk About It
"Make It Alright"	2004	—	33	Let's Talk About It
"My First Love"	2004	—	—	Let's Talk About It
"2 Pieces"	2007	—	63	So Much Better
"Late Night Rendezvous"	2007	—	— (Note: "Late Night Rendezvous" did not enter the US Hot R&B/Hip-Hop Songs, but peaked at number 36 on the US Adult R&B Songs.)	So Much Better
"Don't Kiss Me"	2011	—	54	Conquer
"Christmas in Paris (Yuletide Nights)" (with Marcus Aurelius)	2014	—	—	Non-album singles
"One with Heaven"	2019	—	—	Non-album singles

=== As featured artist ===
List of singles, with selected chart positions
Title	Year	Peak chart positions		Album
Title	Year	US	US R&B	Album
"Can't Believe" (with Faith Evans)	2001	56	14	The Saga Continues.../Faithfully
"Never Be the Same Again" (with Ghostface Killah and Raekwon)	2001	—	65	Bulletproof Wallets
"One Name" (with Sheek Louch)	2005	—	71	After Taxes
"Let Ya' Hair Down" (with Whiski Asadi)	2017	—	—	Non-album singles
"YU" (with One Love, Mr. Goldfinger and Trevor Lawrence, Jr.)	2017	—	—	Non-album singles
"Rewind the Time" (with The Real Chris Lowe)	2019	—	—	Non-album singles
"My Level" (with Finessse111)	2020	—	—	Non-album singles
"Karma (Remix)" (with Donell Jones, Dave Hollister, RL and Jacquees)	2021	—	14 (Note: "Karma (Remix)" did not enter the US Hot R&B/Hip-Hop Songs, but peaked at number 14 on the US Adult R&B Songs.)	Non-album singles
"YU" (with Radio Galaxy)	2021	—	—	Non-album singles

== Album appearances ==
List of album appearances by Carl Thomas
Title	Year	Other artist(s)	Album
"Quarrels"	1997	Amil	All Money Is Legal
"Single Life"	1997	Mic Geronimo, Jay-Z	Vendetta
"The World Is Filled..."	1997	The Notorious B.I.G.	Life After Death
"If I Should Die Tonight (Interlude)"	1997	Puff Daddy	No Way Out
"Press Rewind"	1998	Total	Kima, Keisha, and Pam
"Let's Start Rap Over"	1998	The Lox	Money, Power & Respect
"I Love My Life"	1998	N.O.R.E.	N.O.R.E.
"Buddah in the Air"	1999	The Beatnuts	A Musical Massacre
"Mega's on His Own"	1999	Cormega	Deep Blue Sea
"You Made Me"	1999	Harlem World, Nas	The Movement
"Chicken Heads"	1999	Lil' Cease	The Wonderful World of Cease A Leo
"Ghetto"	1999	Madd Rapper, Raekwon	Tell 'Em Why U Madd
"I Hear Voices"	1999	Puff Daddy	Forever
"The Game"	1999	Tash	Rap Life
"Jasmine"	2000	Black Rob	Life Story
"Change Is Gonna Come (Intro)"	2000	Capone-N-Noreaga	The Reunion
"Lies & Rumors"	2000	Channel Live	Armaghetto
"Right Now"	2000	Lil' Kim	The Notorious K.I.M.
"This Is Us"	2000	LL Cool J	G.O.A.T.
"Everyday"	2000	Memphis Bleek	The Understanding
"So Cool"	2000	Rah Digga	Dirty Harriet
"Summer Rain"	2000	—	Shaft
"Holla Back"	2001	8Ball	Almost Famous
"Karma (Comes Back Around)"	2001	Adam F, Guru	Kaos: The Anti-Acoustic Warfare
"It's All Over"	2001	G. Dep	Child of the Ghetto
"Nasty Girl"	2001	Jadakiss	Kiss tha Game Goodbye
"Life is Like a Park"	2001	Lisa "Left Eye" Lopes	Supernova
"Player Not the Game"	2001	Lil' Mo	Based on a True Story
"The Struggle Will Be Lost"	2002	Busta Rhymes	It Ain't Safe No More...
"Naughty by Nature"	2002	Naughty by Nature	IIcons
"Heaven"	2002	Michelle Williams	Heart to Yours
"Woke Up in the Morning (Remix)"	2002	The Notorious B.I.G.	We Invented the Remix
"How Did I"	2002	—	Undisputed
"Good Enough"	2003	Brian McKnight, Joe, Tank, Tyrese	U-Turn
"I'll Be There"	2003	Loon	Loon
"Hard Times"	2003	Ludacris, 8Ball & MJG	Chicken-n-Beer
"It's Like That"	2004	De La Soul	The Grind Date
"Dumpin'"	2006	2Pac, Hussein Fatal, Papoose	Pac's Life
"I Get By"	2008	David Banner	The Greatest Story Ever Told
"Guilty"	2016	Aaron Camper, Q. Parker	Blow
"Pretty Girls"	2016	Mistah F.A.B., Raekwon, G-Eazy	Son of a Pimp Part 2
