= Home (Monifah album) =

Studio album by Monifah
- Released: October 17, 2000
- Genre: R&B
- Length: 49:20
- Label: Universal
- Producer: David Anthony; Full Force; Rob Fusari; Ty Fyffe; Tyrice Jones; Falonte Moore; Teddy Riley (also exec.); Screwface

Monifah chronology
Mo'hogany (1998)	Home (2000)

Home is the third studio album released by American singer Monifah. It was released by Universal Records on October 17, 2000, in the United States, with Teddy Riley serving as both an executive producer and chief producer on the album. Despite input from Riley, Home was both a critical and commercial failure, becoming her lowest-selling and lowest-charting album, only making it to number 151 on the US Billboard 200 and 39 on the Top R&B/Hip-Hop Albums. The album's only charting single was "I Can Tell"; it was minor hit on the R&B charts.

== Critical reception ==
Professional ratings
Review scores
Source	Rating
AllMusic	2.5/5 stars
Robert Christgau	(neither)
Entertainment Weekly	B+

AllMusic editor Jon Azpiri wrote that "those who know Monifah from her thumping 1998 dance hit "Touch It" will be pleasantly surprised by her lush vocals on Home. However, those who are familiar with Monifah's impressive debut album, Moods...Moments, will be disappointed by Home's poor production and meandering lyrics. Most of the highlights on Home come during its quieter moments [...] Monifah is a considerable talent that is lost among the mediocrity that surrounds her. For Monifah, quality production and strong material are a long way from Home." Craig Seymour from Entertainment Weekly found that "Monifah traffics in moving, mid-tempo tales of yearning, heartbreak, and redemption through self-love on her third album Home.

== Track listing ==
No.	Title	Writer(s)	Producer(s)	Length
1.	"Rescue Me" (Skit)		Teddy Riley	0:24
2.	"Rescue Me"	Kamall Machicote; Lisa Bass; Monifah Carter; Riley	Riley; Ty Fyffe	4:53
3.	"Peaches & Cream"	Carter; Riley; Tyrice Jones	Riley; Jones	3:12
4.	"I Can Tell"	Balewa Muhammad; Falonte Moore; Rob Fusari	Fusari; Moore; Riley^{[a]}	3:10
5.	"Too Late"	Albert Charles; Antoinique Parker; Carter; Nate Smith; Riley; Terry Thompson	Riley; Screwface	4:01
6.	"(How) Ya Gonna Love Me"	Charles; Carter; Riley	Riley; Screwface	3:23
7.	"The Bigger Picture" (Skit)		Screwface	0:48
8.	"Hard to Say Goodbye"	Riley; Jones	Riley; Jones	3:55
9.	"Free Again"	Kowan "Q" Paul; Carter; Riley; Jones	Paul; Riley; Jones	4:25
10.	"Hurry Up" (Skit)	Cheryl Lee; Lisa "Cole" Bass; Dana Owens	Screwface	0:51
11.	"Fairytales"	Charles Cockett; Full Force	Full Force; Riley^{[a]}	3:01
12.	"Brown Eyes"	Chandra Simmons; David Anthony; Riley	Anthony; Riley	4:24
13.	"Feva" (featuring Full Force)	Mashonda Tifrere; Full Force	Full Force; Riley	3:43
14.	"Nana" (featuring Chico DeBarge)	JaRon Henson; Carter; Riley	Riley	4:29
15.	"Home" (Skit)		Screwface	0:39
16.	"Home"	Carter; Shomari; Riley	Riley	3:54
Total length:				49:20

Notes

- ^{^[a]} signifies co-producer

Target edition (bonus track)
No.	Title	Length
1.	"Rescue Me" (Skit)	0:24
2.	"Rescue Me"	4:53
3.	"Peaches & Cream"	3:12
4.	"I Can Tell"	3:10
5.	"Too Late"	4:01
6.	"(How) Ya Gonna Love Me"	3:23
7.	"The Bigger Picture" (Skit)	0:48
8.	"Hard to Say Goodbye"	3:55
9.	"Free Again"	4:25
10.	"Hurry Up" (Skit)	0:51
11.	"Fairytales"	3:01
12.	"Brown Eyes"	4:24
13.	"Feva" (featuring Full Force)	3:43
14.	"Nana" (featuring Chico DeBarge)	4:29
15.	"I Can Tell" (Remix) (featuring Murphy Lee)	3:55
16.	"Home" (Skit)	0:39
17.	"Home"	3:54
Total length:		53:15

== Charts ==
Chart (2000)	Peak position
Canadian R&B Albums (Nielsen SoundScan)	51
US Billboard 200	151
US Top R&B/Hip-Hop Albums (Billboard)	39
