= So Much Better (album) =

Studio album by Carl Thomas
- Released: May 30, 2007
- Length: 68:22
- Labels: Umbrella; Unsung
- Producers: Mike City; Bryan-Michael Cox; Jimmy Jam & Terry Lewis; A. Jermaine Mobley; Hakim Young

Carl Thomas chronology
Let's Talk About It (2004)	So Much Better (2007)	Conquer (2011)

So Much Better is the third studio album by American singer Carl Thomas. It was released by Umbrella Recordings and Unsung Entertainment on June 5, 2007 in the United States. The album marked Thomas's debut release with the label following his departure from Bad Boy after the release of his second album Let's Talk About It (2004). The singer reteamed with frequent collaborator Mike City to work on the majority of So Much Better. Distribution of the album was helmed by Universal Music through Bungalo Records.

The album earned largely positive reviews from music critics. It debuted at number 25 on the US Billboard 200, selling about 28,000 copies in its first week. It also opened and peaked at number two on the US Top R&B/Hip-Hop Albums chart, becoming his third consecutive album to do so. The album was preceded by lead single "2 Pieces," which peaked at number 63 on the US Hot R&B/Hip-Hop Songs and entered the top 20 on the Adult R&B Songs chart. So Much Better's second album was "Late Night Rendezvous."

== Background ==
In March 2004, Thomas' second album, Let's Talk About It, was released by Bad Boy Records. While the album's two singles, "She Is" and title track "Let's Talk About It," were significantly less successful than previous singles, it became his highest-charting album yet, reaching the top five of the US Billboard 200. It was also certified Gold by the Recording Industry Association of America (RIAA). In October 2004, Thomas's brother Duranthony Evans was killed in a drive-by shooting. This devastated Thomas, causing him to take a sabbatical from his music and the promotion of Let's Talk About It.

In 2006, it was reported that Thomas had left Bad Boy Records and would release his next album as part of a one-off deal with Jheryl Busby's Umbrella Recordings and producer Mike City's Unsung Entertainment. While City took over as the album's main producer, Thomas also consulted Jimmy Jam and Terry Lewis, Bryan Michael Cox, and up and coming producing team, Pitch Black, to work with him on the album. Guest vocalists included Brandy, Dave Hollister, and Lalah Hathaway. The cover for So Much Better was photographed by former rapper D-Nice, while the A&R overseeing the project were Hakim Green and Vincent "Tuffy" Morgan, members of the mid-1990s hip hop group Channel Live.

== Critical reception ==
Professional ratings
Review scores
Source	Rating
About.com	3.5/5 stars

Mark Edward Nero from About.com called So Much Better a "flawed gem; the quality of songs varies somewhat – but overall, if you're a fan of traditional R&B, it's worth adding to your collection." AllMusic wrote about the album: "Passionate, sensual, and romantic, yet never lapsing into a retro-themed rehash of the past, So Much Better, Thomas' third album, strikes just the right combination of slick, hip-hop-spiced grooves and vintage R&B soul [...] Sharp production and arrangements add to the overall luster of the disc, making So Much Better a contemporary R&B offering that fans of the genre can sink their teeth into." Billboard found that So Much Better "offers the same sincerity and raw intensity that made us swoon in the first place."

== Commercial performance ==
Released on June 5, 2007 in the United States, So Much Better debuted at number 25 on the US Billboard 200 and number two on the Top R&B/Hip-Hop Albums chart, selling about 28,000 copies in its first week. Thomas' third consecutive album to peak at number two on the latter chart, it marked his first project to miss the top ten of the Billboard 200.

== Track listing ==
So Much Better track listing
No.	Title	Writer(s)	Producer(s)	Length
1.	"If I Could" (Intro)	Thomas; Michael Flowers; D.J. Rogers	Mike City	1:51
2.	"Another You"	Flowers	City	3:28
3.	"2 Pieces"	Flowers	City	3:48
4.	"Thought You Should Know" (featuring Lalah Hathaway)	Thomas; A. Jermaine Mobley; Hakim Young; Gordon Chambers; Troy Taylor; Claude Kelly	Mobley; Young	4:16
5.	"Somethin' Bout You" (featuring Brandy)	Flowers	City	3:55
6.	"If That Ain't Love"	Flowers	City	3:55
7.	"Late Night Rendezvous"	Flowers	City	3:50
8.	"Get You Back" (Interlude)	Thomas; Flowers	City	0:33
9.	"So Much Better"	Flowers	City	4:23
10.	"Oh No (You Can't Be Serious)"	Thomas; Taylor; Mobley; Young	Mobley; Young	4:48
11.	"Can't Get Over" (featuring Dave Hollister)	Flowers	City	4:05
12.	"How Can We"	Flowers	City	4:10
13.	"If You Ever"	Thomas; Bryan Michael Cox	Cox	4:42
14.	"Say I Do"	Thomas; Taylor; Mobley; Young	Mobley; Young	4:37
15.	"I Miss You" (Interlude)	Flowers	City	1:40
16.	"Home"	Thomas; James Harris III; Terry Lewis; James Wright	Jimmy Jam & Terry Lewis; Big Jim^{[A]}	5:03
17.	"Outro" (Remix) (featuring E-40)	Flowers	City	4:20
18.	"Oh No (You Can't Be Serious)" (Remix) (featuring Baby Cham)	Thomas; Taylor; Mobley; Young; Dave Kelly; Damian Beckett	City	4:48
Total length:				68:22

Circuit City bonus tracks
No.	Title	Writer(s)	Producer(s)	Length
19.	"No Trouble"	Flowers	City	4:05
20.	"All My Life"	Flowers	City	5:06

Notes

- ^{^[A]} denotes co-producer

== Personnel ==
Credits adapted from the liner notes of So Much Better.

- Isaiah "IZ" Avila – drums
- Jheryl Busby – executive producer
- Rab Butler – art director, design
- Gordon Chambers – background vocalist
- Mike City – drum programming, executive producer, keyboards, main producer
- Donald "Pup Dawg" – guitar
- Francis "Franchise" Graham – engineer
- Hakim Green – A&R director
- Gene Grimaldi – mastering engineer
- Claude Kelly – background vocalist
- Jimmy Jam – drum programming, keyboards
- Jeff Jones – engineer
- Derrick "D-Nice" Jones – photography
- Parrish Lewis – photography
- Matt Marrin – engineer
- A. Jermaine Mobley – drum programming, keyboards
- Vincent "Tuffy" Morgan – engineer
- Natural – guitar
- Di Reed – background vocalist
- Carl Thomas – executive producer, main vocalist
- Titanic Tracks – engineer
- Troy Taylor – engineer
- Erik Walls – guitar
- Sam Waters – engineer
- James "Big Jim" Wright – drum programming, keyboards

== Charts ==
Weekly chart performance for So Much Better
Chart (2007)	Peak position
US Billboard 200	25
US Top R&B/Hip-Hop Albums (Billboard)	2

== Release history ==
So Much Better release history
Region	Date	Formats	Label	Ref.
Japan	May 30, 2007	CD; digital download	Umbrella; Unsung	
United States	June 5, 2007	CD; digital download	Umbrella; Unsung	
