= Mo'hogany =

Studio album by Monifah
- Released: August 25, 1998
- Recorded: 1997–1998
- Genre: R&B
- Length: 52:27
- Labels: Uptown; Universal
- Producers: Heavy D; Tony Dofat; Chad Elliott; Rob Fusari; Vincent Herbert; N.O. Joe; Jack Knight; Queen Latifah; Alvin West; Mario Winans

Monifah chronology
Moods...Moments (1996)	Mo'hogany (1998)	Home (2000)

Singles from Mo'hogany
- 1. "Touch It" Released: July 21, 1998; 2. "Suga Suga" Released: 1998; 3. "Bad Girl" Released: June 1999

Mo'hogany is the second album by American R&B singer Monifah. It was released on August 25, 1998 through Uptown Records and featured production from Heavy D, Mario Winans and N.O. Joe. Chart-wise, Mo'hogany was more successful than her previous album, making it to 16 on the US Billboard 200 and 2 on the Top R&B/Hip-Hop Albums chart. The album sales increased as its lead single "Touch It" became a top 10 hit, peaking at 9 on the Billboard Hot 100 and becoming the biggest hit of Monifah's career."Monifah's Anthem"/"Bad Girl" (featuring Queen Pen) was a major hit that played on many urban contemporary stations across the US such as WAMO in Pittsburgh, WHUR in Washington D.C, & WDAS in Philadelphia with heavy repeat play during the fall of 1998. Mo'hogany was later certified gold by the RIAA.

== Critical reception ==
Professional ratings
Review scores
Source	Rating
AllMusic	3/5 stars
Robert Christgau	(choice cut)
Entertainment Weekly	C+
Philadelphia Daily News	C
Rolling Stone	3/5 stars
The Sun-Herald	5/10
USA Today	3/4 stars
The Windsor Star	2/5 stars

AllMusic editor Jose F. Promis wrote that Mo'hogany "does incorporate a wide spectrum of sounds and styles, including rock & roll on the awkwardly titled "Monifah's Anthem/Bad Girl" and "Why," plenty of R&B ballads (of which most are lumped together in the middle of the album, weighing it down considerably) [...] Despite some dull moments and less-than-inspired lyrics, Mo'hogany winds up being a decent and relatively enjoyable album."

== Track listing ==
No.	Title	Writer(s)	Producer(s)	Length
1.	"Monifah's Anthem"/"Bad Girl" (featuring Queen Pen)	Vincent Herbert; Rob Fusari; Mary Brown; Monifah Carter; Queen Pen; Donna Summer; Bruce Sudano; Joe Esposito; Edward Hokenson; Kenny Gamble; Leon Huff; Anthony Jackson	Fusari	3:45
2.	"Suga Suga"	Herbert; Fusari; Brown; Carter	Herbert; Fusari	4:38
3.	"Touch It"	Jack Knight; ScrewFace	Knight; ScrewFace^{[a]}	4:45
4.	"Would You"	Heavy D; Tony Dofat	Heavy D; Dofat	4:02
5.	"Have You Ever Been Loved"	Carter; Mario Winans; Shari Watson; Mario Wright; Charles Carpenter; Earl Hines	Winans	3:33
6.	"Fallin' in Love"	Dana Owens; Carter; Herbert	Queen Latifah; Kendo^{[b]}	4:44
7.	"Better Half of Me"	Carter; Winans	Winans	5:25
8.	"What's the Deal"	Knight; ScrewFace; Carter	Knight; ScrewFace^{[a]}	5:19
9.	"Why"	Winans; Watson; Wright; Curtis Mayfield; Edward Fletcher; Sylvia Robinson; Melvin Glover; Clifton Chase	Winans	3:41
10.	"What'cha Gonna Do?"	Chad Elliott; Alvin West; Charmelle Cofield	Elliott; West	3:55
11.	"Monifah's Anthem"/"Bad Girl II" (featuring Queen Pen)	Herbert; Fusari; Brown; Carter; Queen Pen	N.O. Joe; Jo Jo^{[a]}	2:57
12.	"I'm Loving You"	Heavy D; Dofat	Heavy D; Dofat	5:41
Total length:				52:27

Japan bonus track
No.	Title	Length
13.	"No One"	4:15
Total length:		56:42

Notes

- ^{^[a]} signifies co-producer
- ^{^[b]} signifies additional producer

Sample credits

- "Bad Girl" contains replayed elements from "Bad Girls" (1979) as performed by Donna Summer.
- "Touch It" contains a sample of "White Horse" (1983) as performed by Laid Back.
- "Have You Ever Been Loved" contains elements from "Ann, Wonderful One" (1978) as performed by Stanley Turrentine.
- "Why" contains elements from "Freddie's Dead" (1972) as performed by Curtis Mayfield.
- "Bad Girl II" contains replayed elements from "Call Me" (1981) as performed by Skyy.

== Charts ==
=== Weekly charts ===
Chart (1998)	Peak position
US Billboard 200	96
US Top R&B/Hip-Hop Albums (Billboard)	2

=== Year-end charts ===
Chart (1998)	Position
Canadian R&B Albums (SoundScan)	70

== Certifications ==
Region	Certification	Certified units/sales
United States (RIAA)	Gold	500,000^{^}
^{^} Shipments figures based on certification alone.
