= White Horse (Laid Back song) =

- Artwork for 1983 reissue

Single by Laid Back

from the album Keep Smiling
- B-side: "So Wie So (US)"
- Released: 1983
- Recorded: 1982
- Genre: Electro; synth-pop; post-disco
- Length: 3:51
- Label: Sire (US, 7-29346); Medley (Denmark, MDS 272)
- Songwriters: Tim Stahl; John Guldberg
- Producers: Laid Back & The Dwarfs

Laid Back singles chronology
"Sunshine Reggae" (1983)	"White Horse" (1983)	"Party at the White House" (1987)

Music video
- "White Horse" by Laid Back on YouTube

"White Horse" is a song written and performed by Tim Stahl and John Guldberg of the Danish duo Laid Back. It was released as the B-side of their single "Sunshine Reggae" which became a major hit in several European countries. In the US, the A-side was mainly ignored and it was the B-side that became most successful. It was released as a single and went on to spend three weeks at number one on the Dance Charts. The single also made the top five on the R&B singles chart and peaked at number 26 on the Billboard Hot 100. Although being played in European clubs, it failed to chart there when re-released as an A-side.

== Lyrics ==
The song's lyrics, which refer to riding "the white horse" and "the white pony", have been interpreted as references to heroin and/or cocaine use. Rolling Stone described "White Horse" as "[p]erhaps the most unconvincing anti-drug song of all time". An article in the Miami New Times listed it as one of the "top 10 cocaine songs" and stated, "It's often debated whether the white horse in this song refers to cocaine or heroin. Either way, Laid Back's 1983 single starts out persuading you not to ride the white horse but rather to ride the white pony, also a slang term for coke." The book Totally Awesome 80s described "White Horse" as "a song with very few words that still managed to be about the joys of cocaine". An article in the Tampa Bay Times stated, "While the title seems harmless, those in the know figured out the song was about drugs."

Co-writer Tim Stahl referred to an alternative interpretation of the song when interviewed for the book Flashbacks to Happiness: Eighties Music Revisited (published by iUniverse), saying, "Another cute anecdote about the song was when we got a letter from a little girl in Jutland in 1983, thanking us for making a song for her white pony!"

== Charts ==
=== Weekly charts ===
Chart (1984)	Peak position
Belgium (Ultratop 50 Flanders)	18
Canada Top Singles (RPM)	27
Netherlands (Dutch Top 40)	17
Netherlands (Single Top 100)	15
New Zealand (Recorded Music NZ)	49
US Billboard Hot 100	26
US Dance Club Songs (Billboard)	1
US Hot R&B/Hip-Hop Songs (Billboard)	5
US Cash Box	22

=== Year-end charts ===
Chart (1984)	Position
US Hot R&B/Hip-Hop Songs (Billboard)	43

== Samples and cover versions ==
- It has been cited as an influence on Prince's song "Erotic City".
- R&B artist Monifah sampled it on the lead single "Touch It" from her second album, Mo'hogany released in 1998. It peaked at No. 9 on the Billboard Hot 100.

== See also ==
- List of number-one dance singles of 1984 (U.S.)
