= Flinstone (producer) =

American songwriter, record producer

- Also known as: Flinstone
- Born: Francisco Carroll Santa Cruz
- Occupations: Singer; songwriter; record producer
- Website: heatroxent.com

Francisco Carroll Santa Cruz, also known as Flinstone, is an American singer, songwriter, record producer, and music executive.

== Career ==
Raised in Tucson, Arizona, Santa Cruz began his professional career as a recording artist signed to MCA Records, while concurrently holding an artist development deal with acclaimed producer Harvey Mason Jr. During this period, Mason recognized Santa Cruz's emerging aptitude for music programming and production, subsequently mentoring and grooming him for a career behind the scenes in the music industry. Through this mentorship and collaboration, Santa Cruz secured several notable production placements with several well-known artists, including Dane Bowers, Brandy, RL of Next, Kevon Edmonds, and Olivia.

He later also secured additional production agreements with producer Warryn Campbell as well as with production duo Soulshock & Karlin, earning further placements with Destiny's Child members Kelly Rowland and Michelle Williams, Kelly Price, Fantasia, Backstreet Boys, and Jojo. and co-founded Heatrox Entertainment, a full-service production company specializing in music production for recording artists, television, and film. Through this venture, he has contributed to projects for Disney–ABC Television Group, NBC, and the FOX network as well as feature films including Save the Last Dance 2 (2006) and The Next Three Days (2010).

== Personal life ==
Santa Cruz is married to singer-songwriter Lisa Simmons, with whom he has collaborated on several records. The couple lost their Altadena, California home in the Eaton Fire in January 2025.

== Discography ==
=== Singles ===
- "Hallelujah" (2019)
- "Play It Again" (2019)
- "Sorry Sorry" (2020)
- "Stay With Me" (2020)
- "Sin To (Without You)" (2020)
- "Can't Wait" (with Lisa Simmons) (2020)
- "Falling" (2020)
- "I'm Go Far" (with Lisa Simmons) (2020)
- "Still In" (with Lisa Simmons) (2021)
- "Ahh Change" (2022)
- "Different" (2022)

== Written and produced songs ==
Name of song, featured performers, originating album, year released and specified role.
Year	Title	Artist	Album	Songwriter	Producer	Ref(s).
2001	"You Got the Damn Thing"	Olivia	Olivia	check	check	
2002	"Hold On"	Mary Mary	Incredible	check	check	
2002	"So Glad"	Michelle Williams	Heart to Yours	check	check	
2003	"Whatcha Gon' Do"	Kelly Price	Priceless	check	check	
2006	"Said I Wouldn't (No More)"	Fantasia	Fantasia	check	check	
2007	"With You Baby"	Sunshine Anderson	Sunshine at Midnight	check	check	
2007	"Tell Me"	Kelly Rowland	Ms. Kelly	check	check	
2007	"To Please You"	Howard Hewett	If Only	check	check	
