= Keep Smiling =

Keep Smiling may refer to:

- Keep Smiling (1925 film), a 1925 American film directed by Albert Austin, starring Monty Banks
- Keep Smiling (1938 film), a 1938 British film directed by Monty Banks, starring Gracie Fields
- Keep Smiling (1938 American film), a 1938 American film directed by Herbert I. Leeds, starring Jane Withers
- Keep Smiling (2012 film), a 2011 Georgian film
- Keep Smiling (album) (1983), by the Danish group Laid Back
- "Keep Smiling" (song), a 2015 song by Bars and Melody
