= Let's Talk About It =

Studio album by Carl Thomas
- Released: March 23, 2004
- Length: 65:54
- Label: Bad Boy; Universal
- Producer: Paris Bowens; Mike City; Sean Combs; D-Dot; Damien DeSandies; Dre & Vidal; Stevie J; Just Blaze; Ryan Leslie; Eric Roberson; Carl Thomas; Milton Thornton; Tye Tribbett; Thaddaeus Tribbett; Vato; Kanye West; Mario Winans

Carl Thomas chronology
Emotional (2000)	Let's Talk About It (2004)	So Much Better (2007)

Singles from Let's Talk About It
- 1. "She Is" Released: 2004; 2. "Make It Alright" Released: 2004; 3. "My First Love" Released: 2004

Let's Talk About It is the second album by American R&B singer Carl Thomas. It was released by Bad Boy Records and Universal Records on March 23, 2004 in America. While Thomas reunited with many of his previous collaborators from Emotional, including Sean Combs, Mario Winans, Mike City, and Deric Angelettie, he also enlisted new talent such as Just Blaze, Dre & Vidal, and Bad Boy producer Stevie J. At the same time, he sought to take on a broader role in both writing and producing the album himself.

The album earned mixed to positive reviews from music critics and debuted and peaked at number four on the US Billboard 200. While it was later certified gold by the Recording Industry Association of America (RIAA), none of the album's singles achieved the level of success seen with Emotional. Promotion of Let's Talk About It was cut short due to Thomas' brother being gunned down several months after the album's release. It would mark the singer's final release with the Bad Boy label.

== Background ==
In 2000, Bad Boy and Universal Records released Thomas' debut album Emotional. The album peaked at number two on both the US Billboard 200 and the Top R&B/Hip-Hop Albums chart, selling 1.3 million copies domestically, according to Nielsen SoundScan. motional also spawned three hit singles on the Hot R&B/Hip-Hop Songs chart, including the number one hit "I Wish" as well the top ten hit "Emotional" and the top 20 entry "Summer Rain." For his next project with Bad Boy, Thomas, Thomas reteamed with Bad Boy chief Sean "P. Diddy" Combs, Mario Winans, Mike City and Deric "D-Dot" Angelettie to produce tracks new material. On his decision to work with muc of the same rooster of collaborators, the singer commented: "We have chemistry and I didn't feel like anything was broken, so I didn't need to fix it."

== Critical reception ==
Professional ratings
Review scores
Source	Rating
AllMusic	3/5 stars
Blender	3/5 stars
USA Today	3/4 stars
Vibe	3.5/5 stars

Natasha Washington from The Oklahoman found that "taking a break after the success of his previous album, Emotional, proved to be good for Thomas: although he still addresses matters of the heart, he feels more contented in "Let's Talk About It [...] Not much has changed with Thomas, and he remains frank and genuine about love matters. Let's Talk About It will definitely satisfy his loyal fans." Gail Mitchell, wrinting for Billboard felt that it was a "mellower, more content Thomas taking a second time at bat" on Let's Talk About It. She further wrote: "With a nod to Marvin Gaye, Thomas gives his expressive tenor more of a workout this go-round [...] Save for one misstep — the obligatory guest rapper cameo (LL Cool J on "She Is") — Let's Talk About It is consistent and satisfying."

Allmusic editor David Jeffries rated the album three out of five stars. He found that Let's Talk About It "is a very different record from 2000's [debut] Emotional. It's more upbeat, slicker, and riskier. There are really two albums going on here: a moderate one that overcomes some workmanlike production with naughty and clever lyrics, and a meandering one that's warm, personal, and visionary [...] With 16 tracks and only a couple fluff ones, it's easy to whittle this album down to a tight, totally Thomas listen." Aliya S. King, writing for Vibe, gave the album a three and a half ouf of five stars rating. She wrote: "Using grown-up love as a backdrop, Thomas firmly establishes himself with Let’s Talk About It. He successfully honors his upbringing, paying honest tribute to the musicians who have put the Windy City on the musical map." Blender's Chairman Mao wrote: "Unadorned and unpretentious, Carl Thomas is a far cry from the grandstanding and sashaying such artists as R. Kelly and Usher brought to contemporary R&B. What he forsakes in glamour and marketability, he compensates for with affecting everyman anguish."

== Commercial performance ==
Originally slated for release on November 18, 2003, the album was delayed by several months due to Bad Boy's transition to a new distribution deal with Universal. After a second scrapped release date on February 10, 2024, Let's Talk About It was eventually released on March 23, 2004 in the United States. It debuted at number four on the US Billboard 200 and number two on the Top R&B/Hip-Hop Albums chart, selling nearly 139,000 copies in its first week. The album bested the first-week sales of his debut, Emotional, which had entered at number nine with 115,000 copies in 2001. Let's Talk About It was certified both Gold by the Recording Industry Association of America (RIAA) on April 27, 2004.

== Track listing ==
Let's Talk About It track listing
No.	Title	Writer(s)	Producer(s)	Length
1.	"She Is" (featuring LL Cool J)	Adonis Shropshire; Eddie Serrano; Mario Winans; Bernard Jackson; David Conley; David Townsend	Winans; Sean Combs	4:17
2.	"Anything"	Thomas; Elijah "Vato" Harris	Thomas; Harris	3:52
3.	"My First Love"	James Smith; Shannon Jones; Shannon Lawrence; Jack Knight; Jimmy Spicer; Russell Simmons	Just Blaze	4:04
4.	"Let's Talk About It (Interlude)"	Carl Thomas; Deric Angelettie; Victor Castarphen; Gene McFadden; John Whitehead	D-Dot	3:38
5.	"Know It's Alright (Interlude)"	Thomas; Harris; Malik Yusef	Thomas; Harris	2:19
6.	"Make It Alright"	Michael Flowers	Mike City	4:49
7.	"The Baby Maker"	Thomas; Damien DeSandies	Thomas; DeSandies	5:03
8.	"Dreamer"	Thomas; Milton Thornton	Thomas; Thornton	4:16
9.	"A Promise"	Knight; Steven Jordan	Stevie J	4:23
10.	"But Me"	Thomas; Knight; Winans; Michael "Lo" Jones; Shropshire; John Stoddart	Winans; Combs	3:26
11.	"All You've Given"	Andre Harris; Vidal Davis	Dre & Vidal	3:26
12.	"All My Love (Interlude)"	Thomas; City	City	1:56
13.	"Let Me Know"	Thomas; Harris; Jordan; Harve Pierre; Steve Dent; Shropshire; Bono; The Edge	Pierre; Stevie J	5:36
14.	"Rebound"	Eric Roberson; Tye Tribette	Roberson; Paris Bowens; Thaddaeus Tribette; Tribette	6:47
15.	"That's What You Are (Interlude)"	Thomas; David Liang; Ryan Leslie	Liang; Leslie	2:19
16.	"Work It Out"	Thomas; Jordan; Jason Boyd	Stevie J	4:22
17.	"The Way That You Do (featuring Kanye West)^{[a]}"	Thomas; Kanye West; Laura Nyro	West	3:49
Total length:				65:54

Notes

- ^{^[a]} Bonus track

Sample credits

- "Let's Talk About It (Interlude)" contains a sample of "Standing Right Here" by Melba Moore.
- "My First Love" contains an interpolation of "Money (Dollar Bill Y'all)" by Jimmy Spicer.
- "She Is" contains a sample of "Happy" by Surface.
- "But Me" contains a sample of "Over And Over Again" by Bob James.
- "Let Me Know" contains an interpolation of "Love Is Blindness" by U2.
- "The Way That You Do" contains a sample of "Woman's Blues" by Laura Nyro.

== Charts ==
=== Weekly charts ===
Weekly chart performance for Let's Talk About It
Chart (2004)	Peak position
US Billboard 200	4
US Top R&B/Hip-Hop Albums (Billboard)	2

=== Year-end charts ===
Year-end chart performance for Let's Talk About It
Chart (2004)	Position
US Billboard 200	197
US Top R&B/Hip-Hop Albums (Billboard)	39

== Certifications ==
Certifications for Let's Talk About It
Region	Certification	Certified units/sales
United States (RIAA)	Gold	500,000^{^}
^{^} Shipments figures based on certification alone.
