= The Sun Shines Again =

Studio album by Sunshine Anderson
- Released: November 2, 2010
- Length: 38:02
- Label: Verve Forecast
- Producer: Mike City; Rex Rideout; Kelvin Wooten

Sunshine Anderson chronology
Sunshine at Midnight (2007)	The Sun Shines Again (2010)

The Sun Shines Again is the third studio album by American singer Sunshine Anderson. It was released by Verve Forecast Records on November 2, 2010 in the United States.

== Critical reception ==
Professional ratings
Review scores
Source	Rating
AllMusic	3.5/5 stars

AllMusic editor Andy Kellman wrote that Anderson's third album "further demonstrate that the singer has clearly moved past her troubles. While the album is not likely to make Anderson more popular than ever, it’s a triumph – a fan-pleasing one, at that."

== Track listing ==
No.	Title	Writer(s)	Producer(s)	Length
1.	"Say Something"	Jeré Spears; Michael Flores	Mike City	3:45
2.	"Hard Love"	Flores	City	3:32
3.	"2nd Fiddle"	Flores	City	3:39
4.	"Lie to Kick It"	Tierra Brown; City	City	4:17
5.	"Life Back"	Flowers	City	4:30
6.	"Karma's a Mutha"	Flores	City	3:44
7.	"A Warning for the Heart"	Kelvin Wooten; Kendra Foster	Wooten	4:30
8.	"Call My Own"	Flores	City	3:38
9.	"Nervous"	City; Rex Rideout; Anderson; Taura Stinson	Rideout	4:14
10.	"U Doin' It"	Mike Dove; City; Anderson; Stinson	City	3:52

== Charts ==
Chart (2010)	Peak position
US Top R&B/Hip-Hop Albums (Billboard)	50
