= My Dream (album) =

Studio album by Yvette Michele
- Released: August 26, 1997
- Recorded: 1995–1997
- Studios: D&D Studios (New York, NY); Stardust Recording Studio (Montclair, NJ); Po' House Studios (New York, NY); Funktional Productions; The Hit Factory (New York, NY)
- Genre: R&B
- Length: 55:10
- Labels: Franchise; Loud; RCA; BMG
- Producers: Chris Liggio; Dinky Bingham; Full Force; Funkmaster Flex; Ira Schickman; Rheji Burrell; Steve Ivory; Vincent Herbert

Singles from My Dream
- 1. "Everyday & Everynight" Released: 1995; 2. "I'm Not Feeling You" Released: 1997; 3. "DJ Keep Playin' (Get Your Music On)" Released: 1997; 4. "Crazy" Released: 1997; 5. "All I Really Want" Released: 1998

Professional ratings
Review scores
Source	Rating
AllMusic	4.5/5 stars
NME	7/10

My Dream is the only studio album by American R&B singer-songwriter Yvette Michele. It was released on August 26, 1997, through Loud Records. Recording sessions took place at D&D Studios, Po' House Studios and The Hit Factory in New York, at Stardust Recording Studio in Montclair, and at Funktional Productions. Production was handled by Full Force, Funkmaster Flex, Steve Ivory, Chris Liggio, Dinky Bingham, Ira Schickman, Rheji Burrell and Vincent Herbert. In the United States, the album did not reach the Billboard 200, however, it made it to number 46 on the Top R&B/Hip-Hop Albums and number 20 on the Heatseekers Albums. It also reached number 40 in France.

The album was supported with "Everyday & Everynight", "I'm Not Feeling You", "DJ Keep Playin' (Get Your Music On)", "Crazy" and "All I Really Want".

== Track listing ==
Credits adapted from liner notes.

No.	Title	Writer(s)	Producer(s)	Length
1.	"The Way I Feel"	Michele Bryant; Steve Ivory	Steve Ivory	4:23
2.	"Summer Love"	Bryant; Felicia Adams; Bob James	Funkmaster Flex	3:59
3.	"All I Really Want"	Reginald Burrell; Vincent Herbert	Rheji Burrell; Vincent Herbert	5:51
4.	"Crazy"	Bryant; Adams; Kenneth Gamble; Leon Huff	Funkmaster Flex	3:13
5.	"Everyday & Everynight"	Bryant; Aston Taylor	Funkmaster Flex	3:52
6.	"Let's Stay Together"	Bryant; Mashonda Tifrere; Shayisha Brown; Full Force; Ricky Walters	Full Force	3:36
7.	"Only Wanna Be With You"	Bryant; Ivory; Wright	Steve Ivory	5:08
8.	"Something in the Way (You Make Me Feel)"	Angela Winbush	Chris Liggio	3:55
9.	"My Dreams"	Osborne Gould Bingham, Jr.; Ira Schickman; Raymond Calhoun; Charlie Wilson; Morris Kaplan; Rudy Taylor; Feldman	Dinky Bingham; Ira Schickman	3:29
10.	"The First Time"	Bryant; Full Force; Taylor; Tifrere; Michelob	Full Force; Funkmaster Flex	4:18
11.	"So We Can Get Down (Yea Yea)"	Bryant; Tifrere; Full Force; Darryl Ellis; Paul Richmond; Ruben Locke Jr.	Full Force	4:37
12.	"I'm Not Feeling You"	Bryant; Michelob; Sylvester James, Jr.; Harvey Fuqua	Funkmaster Flex; Michelob (co.)	3:25
13.	"DJ Keep Playin' (Get Your Music On)"	Brian George; Curtis Bedeau; Gerard Charles; Hugh Clarke; Lucien George; Paul George; Eddie Thomas	Full Force	4:46
Total length:				55:10

Bonus track
No.	Title	Writer(s)	Producer(s)	Length
14.	"I'm Not Feeling You" (Reggae Mix)	Bryant; James, Jr.; Fuqua	DJ Riz (add.); DJ Sizzahandz (add.)	3:39

== Charts ==
Chart performance for My Dream
Chart (1997)	Peak position
French Albums (SNEP)	40
US Top R&B/Hip-Hop Albums (Billboard)	46
US Heatseekers Albums (Billboard)	20
