= Your Woman (album) =

Studio album by Sunshine Anderson
- Released: April 17, 2001
- Studio: Various: Skip Saylor Studios; Westlake Audio; Silent Sounds (Los Angeles, California); Ocean Studios (Burbank, California); Track Record (North Hollywood, California); Quad Studios (New York City, New York)
- Genre: R&B
- Length: 59:18
- Label: Soulife; Atlantic
- Producer: Mike City; Mark Sparks

Sunshine Anderson chronology
Your Woman (2001)	Sunshine at Midnight (2007)

Singles from Your Woman
- 1. "Heard It All Before" Released: February 27, 2001; 2. "Lunch or Dinner" Released: September 18, 2001

Your Woman is the debut album by American singer Sunshine Anderson. It was released by Soulife Recordings and Atlantic Records on April 17, 2001 in the United States. Chiefly written and produced by Mike City, the album peaked at number five on the US Billboard 200 and was certified Gold by the Recording Industry Association of America (RIAA). Your Woman features the single "Heard It All Before" and the follow-up single, "Lunch or Dinner".

== Promotion ==
Released as the album's lead single on February 27, 2001, "Heard It All Before" reached the top ten on both the UK Singles Chart and the US Billboard Hot R&B/Hip-Hop Singles & Tracks chart while peaking at the number 18 on the Billboard Hot 100. From July to August 2001, she embarked on a 27-date US tour alongside R. Kelly and Syleena Johnson. A second and final single from Your Woman, "Lunch or Dinner," was released in September 2001 but failed to reach the top 50 on any chart. In further promotion, Atlantic Records had Anderson visit high schools in twelve cities, including her hometown of Charlotte, N.C., and also teamed with the House of Courvoisier for a 10-city showcase tour.

== Critical reception ==
Professional ratings
Review scores
Source	Rating
AllMusic	3/5 stars
Blender	3/5 stars
Entertainment Weekly	B
Los Angeles Times	1/4 stars
MTV Asia	3/5 stars
NME	4.5/5 stars

Blender critic Keith Harris wrote that, "despite able pop-tinged jazz-soul production from Mike City, the album never surpasses its jaunty first single. By mid-album, the arrangements peter out into a redundant bounce of piano and drum over which Anderson launches into Mariah-like vocal runs. Yet graceful melodies like 'Lunch or Dinner' suggest a burgeoning singer who might well blossom into her own diva someday soon." Mark Anthony Neal of PopMatters described Your Woman as a solid release, noting that while the album as a whole does not fully match the excitement of its lead single, tracks such as "He Said, She Said" and Anderson’s lyrical contributions, together with production by Mike City, show her potential. AllMusic editor Jon Azpiri observed that, "while too many pop and R&B divas rely on Mariah Carey-like vocal histrionics, Sunshine Anderson wins over fans with her understated maturity. Your Woman features some solid production by Mike City and Mark Spark, and rather than trying to overpower the music with her voice, Anderson has enough confidence to just go along for the ride."

Sheng Yuen of MTV Asia described the album as a promising effort demonstrating Anderson’s vocal talent and songwriting ability, highlighting its cohesion and noting tracks such as "Heard It All Before" and "Being Away" for their effectiveness. Tom Sinclair of Entertainment Weekly wrote, "Anderson's not an envelope pusher à la Badu, but she’s got a knack for crafting freshly minted soul scorchers that old and new schoolers alike can get behind, making this debut album a relative ray of… well, you know." NME editor Jacqueline Springer praised Your Woman for its vibrant production, layered vocals, and clever handling of relationship themes, highlighting tracks like "Heard It All Before" and "Lunch or Dinner," describing it as a standout, forward-looking contribution to 2001’s R&B and soul music. Billboard called the album a "warm, well-crafted set" and added: "Infused with rich tones and honest lyrics, the vocally gifted Anderson follows in the soul-sister tradition of such artists as Mary J. Blige and Faith Evans, with tales of love found and lost forming the album's backbone. Veteran producers Mike City and Mark Sparks deftly maintain a cohesive sound throughout."

== Commercial performance ==
Your Woman debuted and peaked at number five on the US Billboard 200 with first week sales of about 75,000 copies. It also reached number two on Billboard's Top R&B/Hip-Hop Albums chart and number 39 on the UK Albums Chart. By July 2006, Your Woman had sold 487,000 copies in the United States, according to Nielsen SoundScan.

== Track listing ==
Your Woman track listing
No.	Title	Writer(s)	Producer(s)	Length
1.	"A Little Sunshine (Intro)"	Michael Flowers	Mike City	0:36
2.	"Better Off"	Flowers	City	4:04
3.	"He Said, She Said"	Flowers	City	3:35
4.	"Heard It All Before"	Flowers; Sunshine Anderson; Rayshawn Sherrer; Chris Dawley	City	4:54
5.	"Vulnerability (Skit)"	Mark Sparks; Jimane Nelson	Sparks; Nelson	1:02
6.	"Letting Down My Guard"	Flowers	City	3:49
7.	"Where Have You Been"	Flowers	City	4:12
8.	"Saved the Day"	Flowers	City	3:29
9.	"Lunch or Dinner"	Flowers	City	4:06
10.	"Last Night" (featuring Anthony Hamilton & Dolo Pachino)	Flowers; Anderson; Hamilton; Ricky Elliott	City	4:12
11.	"Your Woman (Interlude)"	Flowers	City	1:16
12.	"Your Woman"	Flowers	City	3:29
13.	"Airport (Skit)"	Sparks	Sparks	2:10
14.	"Being Away"	Flowers; Loris Holland	City	4:12
15.	"Crazy Love"	Sparks; Flowers; Anderson; Erick Walls; Erick T. Coomes	Sparks; Walls^{[A]}; Coomes^{[A]}	4:38
16.	"You Do You"	Sparks; Flowers; Anderson; Johnny Mercier; Michael Lindsey	Sparks; Mercier^{[A]}; Lindsey^{[A]}	4:00
17.	"Spoken Word (Skit)"	Sparks; Flowers; Anderson; Walls; Coomes	Sparks; Walls^{[A]}; Coomes^{[A]}	1:56
18.	"A Little Sunshine"	Flowers	City	3:38
Total length:				59:18

Notes

- ^{^[A]} denotes co-producer

== Personnel ==
- Kwaku Alston – photography
- Sunshine Anderson – vocals
- Richard Bates – art direction
- Mike City – backing vocals, executive producer, instruments
- Douglas Coleman – recording engineer
- Erick T. Coomes – bass
- Mikey Dan – backing vocals
- Chris Dawley – executive producer
- Timothy Deberry – backing vocals
- Larry Furgerrson – mastering
- Brian Gardner – mastering
- Lalah Hathaway – backing vocals
- Shayne Ivy – design
- Michael Linsdey – bass
- Manny Marroquin – mixing
- Johnny Mercier – keyboards
- Mark Mitchell – recording engineer
- Jimanie Nelson – keyboards
- Mike Potivch – recording engineer
- Jesse "Biz" Stewart – recording engineer
- James "Storm" Singletary – drum programming
- Mark Sparks – executive producer, drum programming
- Erick Walls – guitar

== Charts ==
=== Weekly charts ===
Weekly chart performance for Your Woman
Chart (2001)	Peak position
UK Albums (OCC)	39
UK R&B Albums (OCC)	6
US Billboard 200	5
US Top R&B/Hip-Hop Albums (Billboard)	2

=== Year-end charts ===
Year-end chart performance for Your Woman
Chart (2001)	Position
US Top R&B/Hip-Hop Albums (Billboard)	73

== Certifications ==
Certifications and sales for Your Woman
Region	Certification	Certified units/sales
United States (RIAA)	Gold	500,000^{^}
^{^} Shipments figures based on certification alone.
