= Sunshine at Midnight =

Studio album by Sunshine Anderson
- Released: January 23, 2007
- Length: 46:07
- Label: Music World
- Producers: Big Bert; Junius Bervine; Mike City; Flintstone; Alonzo Jackson; D. Lamb; Mattmatix; Walter Millsap III; Candice Nelson; Nottz; Raphael Saadiq; Clay Sears

Sunshine Anderson chronology
Your Woman (2001)	Sunshine at Midnight (2007)	The Sun Shines Again (2010)

Singles from Sunshine at Midnight
- 1. "Something I Wanna Give You" Released: December 5, 2006; 2. "Force of Nature" Released: May 15, 2007; 3. "Wear the Crown" Released: 2007

Sunshine at Midnight is the second studio album by American singer Sunshine Anderson. It was released in the United States by Music World Entertainment on January 23, 2007.

== Critical reception ==
Professional ratings
Review scores
Source	Rating
About.com	3.5/5 stars
AllMusic	2.5/5 stars
Entertainment Weekly	B
PopMatters	3/10
Spin	3/5 stars
USA Today	2.5/4 stars

Sunshine at Midnight earned largely mixed reviews from music critics. Margeaux Watson, writing Entertainment Weekly, gave the album a B rating and noted: "Anderson lacks Beyoncé's polish, but her raspy voice has a street-smart edge that evokes early Mary J. Blige. The first half of Sunshine at Midnight is packed with rump-shakin’ fits of fury, while slow jams dominate the latter. Anderson’s talent is fully grown, but her infatuation with thugs — and their underwear — is a juvenile distraction." Billboard found that "earnest tunes permeate" the album and added: "Whether blaming a longtime partner for consuming her time or reveling in true love, Anderson sounds determined to send a message. While her shrill soprano pipes won't bowl you over, her candor surely will." David Peisner from Spin called the album a "snarling comeback."

AllMusic wrote that Anderson's "second album, imaginatively produced with a wide range of hip, grainy-sounding beats, deals with the tough realities of relationships, in songs as varied as the grittily realistic "Problems," "Switch It Up," superficially about romance gone stale but more concerned with turning a life around, and the galumphing "Trust," whose mutant beat buffers a tale of deceit. Anderson never leaves any doubt who's in control, though she can still turn on the erotic softness in silk-sheet jams like "Force of Nature"." Steve Jones of USA Today gave Sunshine at Midnight a two-and-a-half-star rating, praising her return with a mix of empowerment and vulnerability. He highlighted her confident delivery on songs about heartbreak while noting tracks such as "Force of Nature" and "Wear the Crown" showed a more optimistic side. In a negative review, Mike Joseph from PopMatters concluded: "While R&B divas like Jill Scott and Alice Smith add witty lyrics and musicianship to their soulful vocals, Anderson seems content to be the patron saint for the girlfriend of every lie-detector-test-taking cheating man on The Maury Povich Show. With an album this lackluster, it’s safe to say that this Sunshine Anderson will be quickly slipping into darkness."

== Commercial performance ==
Sunshine at Midnight debuted and peaked at number 86 on the US Billboard 200. It also reached number 16 on the Top R&B/Hip-Hop Albums chart.

== Track listing ==
Sunshine at Midnight track listing
No.	Title	Writer(s)	Producer(s)	Length
1.	"Something I Wanna Give You"	Walter Millsap III; Candice Nelson; Eugene Record	Milsap; Nelson	3:45
2.	"Trust"	Yummy Bingham; Junius Bervine	Bervine; Clay Sears	3:34
3.	"My Whole Life"	Sunshine Anderson; Taura Jackson; Dominick Lamb; Stephen Garrett; Curtis Mayfield	Nottz	3:25
4.	"Switch It Up"	Michael Flowers	Mike City	4:17
5.	"Good Love"	Flowers	City	4:12
6.	"Being with You"	Flowers	City	3:46
7.	"Problems"	Flowers	City	4:30
8.	"Wear the Crown"	Anderson; Raphael Saadiq; Taura Jackson; Alonzo Jackson	Saadiq	3:36
9.	"Force of Nature"	Anderson; T. Jackson	A. Jackson	3:50
10.	"Unbelievable"	Anderson; Robert Smith; Tamara Savage	Big Bert	3:58
11.	"With You Baby"	Francisco C. Santa Cruz; Trecina Campbell	Flintstone	3:47
12.	"Sunshine at Midnight"	Anderson; LaTrenee Winchester Lake; Matthew Lake	Mattmatix	3:24
Total length:				46:07

Sample credits

- "Something I Wanna Give You" contains a sample of "I Want to Pay You Back (For Loving Me)", as performed by The Chi-Lites
- "My Whole Life" contains a sample of "Back Against the Wall", as performed by Curtis Mayfield

== Personnel ==
- Joan Allen – photography
- Sunshine Anderson – executive producer
- Yummy Bingham – backing vocals
- Big Bert – programming
- Junius Bervine – programming
- Gerry Brown – recording engineer
- Mike City – programming
- Mikey Dan – backing vocals
- Dr. Dre – mixing
- Blake English – recording engineer
- Flintstone – programming
- Brian Gardner – mastering
- Daniel Garraga – photography
- Chris Gehringer – mastering
- Franny "Franchise" Graham – mixing, recording engineer
- Jeri Heiden – art direction, design
- Alonzo Jackson – programming, recording engineer
- Taura Jackson – backing vocals
- Mathew Knowles – executive producer
- Dave Lopez – mixing
- Stephen Marsh – mastering
- Mattmatix – recording engineer
- Walter Milsap III – bass, programming, recording engineer
- Conesha Monet – backing vocals
- Glen Nakasako – art direction, design
- Candice Nelson – recording engineer
- Nottz – programming, recording engineer
- Frederico Perez – executive producer
- Isaac Phillips – guitar
- Danny Romero – mixing
- Raphael Saadiq – bass, guitar, programming
- Clay Sears – guitar
- Daryl Sloan – recording engineer
- Tatsuya Soto – recording engineer
- John Tanksley – recording engineer
- Brindin "Nytro" Taylor – additional keyboards

== Charts ==
Weekly chart performance for Sunshine at Midnight
Chart (2007)	Peak position
US Billboard 200	86
US Top R&B/Hip-Hop Albums (Billboard)	16
