= Sunshine Reggae =

Single by Laid Back

from the album Keep Smiling
- Released: July 1983
- Recorded: 1982
- Genre: Reggae
- Length: 4:16 / 4:08 (different single editions); 6:35 (12" single)
- Songwriters: Tim Stahl; John Guldberg

Music video
- "Sunshine Reggae" on YouTube

"Sunshine Reggae" is a song written and recorded by Danish electronic music duo Laid Back. It was originally released as a single in July 1983 and released on their second album Keep Smiling (1983). As an international summer hit of 1983, it is the band's most successful song.

== Reception and versions ==
"Sunshine Reggae" reached number one in Germany and Austria in September 1983. It peaked at number three in Italy, four in the Netherlands and Flanders (Belgium), and number nine in Switzerland. It was surprisingly popular in South America. Its popularity was further increased by a film named after the song, Sunshine Reggae in Ibiza, which premiered in November 1983.

The song appeared in various single versions released by Metronome Records, Polydor Records, Sire Records, CBS and Atlas Records. The song was also released in different versions as a 12" maxi single with a length of about 6:30 minutes.

In the music video, band members are bored office workers who fantasize about a South Sea beach, where they perform the song, have fun, and play music with the locals. The video was recorded in Sri Lanka.

In the US, the single's B-side song, "White Horse", became more successful. It was released as a single and went on to spend three weeks at number one on the Dance Charts.

== Charts ==
Chart (1983–84)	Peak position
Argentina (CAPIF)	1
Austria (Ö3 Austria Top 40)	1
Belgium (Ultratop 50 Flanders)	4
Canada (RPM)	46
Ireland (Irish Singles Chart)	15
Italy (Musica e dischi)	3
Netherlands (Single Top 100)	4
Switzerland (Schweizer Hitparade)	9
Uruguay (CUD)	1
West Germany (GfK)	1

== Certifications ==
Region	Certification	Certified units/sales
Canada (Music Canada)	Gold	50,000^{^}
Germany (BVMI)	Gold	500,000^{^}
^{^} Shipments figures based on certification alone.

== Cover versions ==
A version by the Nips (this was the name of an Italian studio production group, and not to be confused with the Nips from the UK) peaked at number three in Switzerland in 1983. In 2000, the version by Laid Back vs. Funkstar De Luxe peaked at number 68 in Germany. It ranked number 66 on the 2000 year-end for Music & Media's Border Breakers chart, a European airplay chart factoring in radio play outside of each artist's country of label signing.
