= Jheryl Busby =

American music industry executive

- Born: Jheryl Busby; May 5, 1949; Los Angeles, California, US
- Died: November 4, 2008 (aged 59) Malibu, California, US
- Occupations: Record producer, record executive
- Years active: 1970–2008

Jheryl Busby (May 5, 1949 – November 4, 2008) was an American recording company executive who was the former president and chief executive officer of Motown Records.

== Biography ==
Busby grew up in South Central Los Angeles, where he went to John C. Fremont High School. He attended Long Beach State College, dropping out after two years.

Busby began his business career at Mattel Toys, starting as an inventory clerk and ultimately being promoted to new-toy coordinator.

His first exposure to the recording industry was at Stax Records, where he was named head of West Coast promotion and marketing, After leaving Stax, he did promotional work for A&M Records and Casablanca Records.

At MCA Records, where he was hired in 1984, Busby was vice-president of the black music division building the unit largely from scratch, promoting established acts such as Patti LaBelle and helping to discover and market acts including family band The Jets, Jody Watley, Bobby Brown and New Edition. By the mid-'80s, the division's sales reached $50 million and was top-ranked for years in black album sales. By 1988, Busby was president of the black music division at MCA, and his business unit led the industry in black album sales.

When Boston Ventures and Music Corporation of America bought Motown Records from Berry Gordy in June 1988 for $61 million, Gordy stipulated that 20% of the firm be retained by African-American investors; Busby purchased an unspecified stake in the firm. Busby moved to Motown Records in 1988 as the company's President & CEO in 1988. Annual sales for Motown had dropped to $20 million (from a peak of $100 million, at Motown's height), with 60–70% of sales coming from sales of its old hits. Busby fostered the growth of younger talent, including Another Bad Creation, Boyz II Men, Johnny Gill and Queen Latifah. In early 1989, he was able to sign Diana Ross back to Motown after she left for RCA Records in 1981. Busby retained artists such as Lionel Richie, Smokey Robinson and Stevie Wonder, and helped create hits from them and for Ross. When Polygram Records bought Motown for $301 million in 1993, Busby was retained as president. By 1990, the label had five songs reach number one on the R&B charts.

Busby was appointed head of the black music division at DreamWorks Records in 1998. He left DreamWorks in 2001. He was named president of Def Soul Classics in 2004. Umbrella Recordings, which he created with producer Mike City, released the Carl Thomas album So Much Better in 2007 and Patti LaBelle's The Gospel According to Patti LaBelle, her first gospel album.

Busby was a major shareholder along with Janet Jackson and Magic Johnson in the nation's first African-American-owned national bank, Founders National Bank, and served on the bank's board of directors.

Busby died at the age of 59 on November 4, 2008. He was found dead in the hot tub of his home in Malibu, the cause was later confirmed to be accidental drowning, it is believed preexisting medical conditions including "atheroscelerotic cardiovascular disease" and "diabetes mellitus may have contributed to the drowning.
