= Conquer (Carl Thomas album) =

Studio album by Carl Thomas
- Released: December 6, 2011
- Length: 48:23
- Label: Verve Forecast
- Producer: BlacElvis; Mike City; Earl & E; Andre Harris; Heavy D; J.R. Hutson; Rico Love; Mario Winans

Carl Thomas chronology
So Much Better (2007)	Conquer (2011)

Conquer is the fourth album by American R&B singer Carl Thomas. It was released by Verve Forecast on December 6, 2011.

== Critical reception ==
Professional ratings
Review scores
Source	Rating
Allmusic	3.5/5 stars

In his review for Allmusic, David Jeffries rated the album three and a half out of five stars. He called the album "in true Thomas fashion, a mixed bag." Comparing it to his previous efforts, Jeffries found that Conquer was more aware of Thomas's "strengths than any release since his debut [...] Material-starved fans craving his rich, warm, and velvety delivery should ignore all these minor complaints and plunder at will."

== Track listing ==
Conquer – Standard edition
No.	Title	Writer(s)	Producer(s)	Length
1.	"The Night Is Yours"	Dwight Watson; Howard Coney, Jr.; Lee Hutson, Jr.; Robert L. Allen	J.R. Hutson	3:15
2.	"Long Distance Love Affair"	Earl Hood; Eric Goudy II; Pierre Medor; Rico Love	Earl & E; Love	3:49
3.	"Conquer"	Carl Thomas; Andre Harris; James Fauntleroy; Casey Phillips	Harris; Phillips^{[B]}	3:54
4.	"Round 2"	Thomas; Harris; Phillips; Derwin Howell; Ryan Toby; Trevion Stokes II	Harris	4:11
5.	"It's Not the Same"	Michael Flowers	Mike City	3:40
6.	"Don't Kiss Me"	Hood; Goudy; Love	Earl & E; Love	5:33
7.	"It Is What It Is"	Dwight Myers; Mike Winans; Rex Rideout	Heavy D	3:50
8.	"It Ain't Fair"	Mario Winans; Michael "Lo" Jones; Ryuichi Sakamoto	Winans	3:42
9.	"Sweet Love"	Flowers	City	4:33
10.	"Running"	DJ Rogers; Elvis Williams	BlacElvis; Rogers^{[A]}	3:44
11.	"Don't Kiss Me (Remix)" (featuring Snoop Dogg)	Hood; Goudy; Love; Calvin Broadus	Earl & E; Love	4:32

iTunes bonus track
No.	Title	Writer(s)	Producer(s)	Length
12.	"I Do"	Thomas; Marcos Palacios; Ernest Tuo Clark; Eric Jackson	Da Internz	3:19

Notes and sample credits

- ^{^[A]} denotes co-producer
- ^{^[B]} denotes additional producer
- "It Ain't Fair" contains a sample from "Seven Samurai: Ending Theme" as performed by Ryuichi Sakamoto.

== Charts ==
Chart (2011)	Peak position
US Billboard 200	165
US Top R&B/Hip-Hop Albums (Billboard)	21

== Release history ==
Region	Date	Formats	Label	Ref.
Various	December 6, 2011	CD; digital download	Verve Forecast	
