= Emotional (Carl Thomas album) =

Studio album by Carl Thomas
- Released: April 18, 2000
- Length: 60:00
- Labels: Bad Boy; Arista
- Producers: Mike City; Gordon Chambers; Sean Combs; D-Dot; Anthony Dent; Damien DeSandies; J-Dub; K-Gee; Brian Keirulf; Heavy D.; Ron Lawrence; Harve Pierre; Joshua M. Schwartz; Garrette "Blake" Smith; Rashad Smith; Carl Thomas; Chucky Thompson; Mario Winans

Carl Thomas chronology
Emotional (2000)	Let's Talk About It (2004)

Singles from Emotional
- 1. "Summer Rain" Released: January 11, 2000; 2. "I Wish" Released: February 15, 2000; 3. "Emotional" Released: September 15, 2000

Emotional is the debut album by American R&B singer Carl Thomas. It was released by Bad Boy Records and Arista Records on April 18, 2000, in the United States. Thomas worked with Bad Boy's in-house producers Sean "Puff Daddy" Combs, Harve Pierre, Mario Winans, Chucky Thompson, Deric Angelettie, and Ron "Amen-Ra" Lawrence. Additional musicians include Mike City, K-Gee, Gordon Chambers, Anthony Dent, Damien DeSandies, and Heavy D, among others.

The album earned largely positive reviews from music critics. It debuted and peaked at number nine on the US Billboard 200 and number two on the Top R&B/Hip-Hop Albums chart, moving more than 115,000 units in its first week. It eventually reached Platinum status in the United States and sold 1.3 million copies domestically. Emotional produced three singles, including the Hot R&B/Hip-Hop Songs number-one hit "I Wish," and won Thomas the NAACP Image Award for Outstanding New Artist.

== Promotion ==
"Summer Rain" was released as the album's lead single. The song became a sleeper hit and did not chart on the US Billboard Hot 100 until follow-up "I Wish" charted. "Summer Rain" ended up peaking at number 80 on the week of October 14, 2000. "I Wish" was released as the Emotional's second single and became the album's highest-charting single, peaking at number 20 on the US Billboard Hot 100 in the week of May 13, 2000. It also became a number-one hit on the US Hot R&B/Hip-Hop Songs chart. Third and final single "Emotional" peaked at number 47 on the US Billboard Hot 100 in the week of December 30, 2000. "Woke Up in the Morning" was released as a promotional single in 2000. Its remix features the Notorious B.I.G.

== Critical reception ==
Professional ratings
Review scores
Source	Rating
AllMusic	2/5 stars
Rolling Stone	3.5/5 stars
USA Today	3.5/4 stars

Michael Paoletta from Billboard found that on Emotional the singer "shifts into romantic over-drive on his debut album – and that's a good thing [...] Thomas deservedly takes a giant step to the forefront on this 17-track debut," crafting "his own brand of new-millenium soul while paying homage to the original groove of the '70s and '80s." Rolling Stone rated the album three and a half stars out of five and called the album "an unabashedly romantic work, spun on the twin poles of longing and loss [...] laying bare a notable ambition within the ballad genre [...] Thomas proves himself a more than viable heir to the tradition of race-music crooners." It was included in Rolling Stone's Top 50 Albums of 2000 listing.

Michael A. Gonzalez, writer for Vibe called Emotional an "exquisite, lush soundtrack that the lovelorn of the world can call their own [...] Thomas endears us with his vulnerability, standing emotionally naked and unpretentious at a time when R&B has lost nearly all of its romance and subtlety." Gonzalez's colleague Imir Leveque, also from Vibe, found that with Emotional "Thomas walks the fine line of being a Brian McKnight clone, but thanks to the sleek production and the genuine empathy his voice exhumes, he establishes himself as a formidable talent." AllMusic editor Heather Phares felt that "though the set features competent singing, songwriting, and production, outside of the singles, it's not a particularly distinctive collection. Thomas' voice is impressive, but he needs better and more varied material to truly shine."

== Commercial performance ==
Emotional debuted and peaked at number nine on the US Billboard 200 and number two on the Top R&B/Hip-Hop Albums chart, moving more than 115,000 units in its first week. The album reached Gold status on May 18, 2000 and was eventually certified Platinum by the Recording Industry Association of America (RIAA) on December 11, 2000. By December 2003, Emotional had sold more than 1.3 million copies in the United States, according to Nielsen Soundscan.

== Track listing ==
Emotional track listing
No.	Title	Writer(s)	Producer(s)	Length
1.	"Intro"	Mario Winans	Winans	0:49
2.	"Emotional"	Carl Thomas; Kenneth Hickson; Winans; Sting	Winans	4:31
3.	"I Wish"	Michael Flowers; Thomas	Mike City; Thomas^{[A]}	3:48
4.	"Anything (Interlude)"	Winans	Winans	1:37
5.	"My Valentine"	Gordon Chambers; Karl Gordon	Chambers; K-Gee	4:11
6.	"Giving You All My Love"	Thomas; Isaac Hayes; Kelly Price; Winans	Winans	3:32
7.	"Cadillac Rap (Interlude)"	Michael Henderson	Thomas	0:54
8.	"Woke Up In the Morning"	Thomas; Harve Pierre; Sean Combs; Winans; Christopher Wallace; Nashiem Myrick; Carlos Broady; Darryl McDaniels	Pierre; Puff Daddy; Winans^{[A]}	4:12
9.	"Come to Me"	Thomas; Anthony Dent; Jeffery Walker; Al Green; Al Jackson Jr.; Wille Mitchell	Dent; J-Dub; Pierre^{[A]}	4:24
10.	"Cold, Cold World"	Thomas; Ron "Amen-Ra" Lawrence; Mark Batson	Lawrence; Batson^{[A]}	4:20
11.	"Trouble Won't Last (Interlude)"	Chucky Thompson; Malik Yusef	Thompson	2:04
12.	"You Ain't Right"	Flowers; Thomas	City; Thomas^{[A]}	3:16
13.	"Lady Lay Your Body"	Thomas; Damien DeSandies	DeSandies; Pierre; Thomas^{[A]}	5:09
14.	"Supastar"	Brian Keirulf; Thomas; Joshua M. Schwartz; Rashad Smith	Keirulf; Schwartz; Smith	3:51
15.	"Summer Rain"	DJ Rogers; Dwight Myers; Stevie Wonder	Heavy D	3:53
16.	"Hey Now"	Thomas; Myers	Heavy D	5:22
17.	"Special Lady"	Thomas; Deric Angelettie; Garrette "Blake" Smith	D-Dot; Smith	4:33
Total length:				60:00

Notes

- ^{^[A]} denotes co-producer

Sample credits

- "Emotional" contains samples and interpolations of "Shape of My Heart" by Sting.
- "Giving You All My Love" contains a sample of "Wherever You Are" by Isaac Hayes.
- "Cadillac Rap (Interlude)" contains a sample of "Be My Girl" by the Dramatics.
- "Woke Up in the Morning" contains a sample from "My Downfall" by the Notorious B.I.G.
- "Come to Me" contains a sample from "Let's Stay Together" By Roberta Flack.
- "Summer Rain" contains an interpolation of "Summer Soft" by Stevie Wonder.

== Personnel ==
Credits adapted from the album's liner notes.

- Charles "Prince Charles" Alexander – engineer, mixing
- Ben H. Allen – engineer
- Mark Batson – engineer
- Rick Brown – associate executive producer
- Tom Cassel – recorder
- Gordon Chambers – producer
- Roger Che – recorder
- Mike City – producer
- Sean "Puffy" Combs – executive producer
- Dave Dar – assistant engineer
- Stephen Dent – engineer
- John Eaton – engineer
- Datu Faison – associate executive producer
- Rasheed Goodlowe – assistant engineer
- Terri Haskins – wardrobe design
- Heavy D – producer
- Ron Lawrence – producer
- Ken Huffnagle – assistant engineer
- Herb Powers – mastering
- Jeff Lane – engineer
- Paul Logus – mixing
- Kim Lumpkin – project manager
- Dominick Mancuso – assistant engineer
- Tony Maserati – mixing
- Lynn Montrose – assistant engineer
- Nigel Parry – photography
- Rob Paustain – mixing
- Joe "Smilin' Joe" Perrera – engineer
- Harve Pierre – A&R, associate executive producer, producer
- Kelly Price – background vocalist
- Nivea - background vocalist
- Marlon Robinson – background vocalist
- Ed Raso – engineer
- Garrett Blake Melodeus Smith – producer
- Carl Thomas – producer
- Chucky Thompson – producer
- J. Willbanks – assistant engineer
- Mario Winans – producer, vocals
- Malik Yusef – words

== Charts ==
=== Weekly charts ===
Weekly chart performance for Emotional
Chart (2000)	Peak position
US Billboard 200	9
US Top R&B/Hip-Hop Albums (Billboard)	2

=== Year-end charts ===
2000 year-end chart performance for Emotional
Chart (2000)	Position
US Billboard 200	97
US Top R&B/Hip-Hop Albums (Billboard)	21

2001 year-end chart performance for Emotional
Chart (2001)	Position
US Top R&B/Hip-Hop Albums (Billboard)	77

== Certifications ==
Certifications for Emotional
Region	Certification	Certified units/sales
United States (RIAA)	Platinum	1,300,000
