= Moods...Moments =

Studio album by Monifah
- Released: March 26, 1996
- Recorded: 1995
- Genre: R&B
- Length: 62:21
- Label: Uptown
- Producer: Alfred Antoine; Kip Collins; Bill Esses; Andre Evans; Heavy D; Poke & Tone; Spaceman Patterson; Red Hot Lover Tone

Monifah chronology
Moods...Moments (1996)	Mo'hogany (1998)

Singles from Moods...Moments
- 1. "I Miss You (Come Back Home)" Released: December 1995; 2. "You" Released: May 14, 1996; 3. "You Don't Have to Love Me" Released: January 14, 1997; 4. "I Still Love You" Released: 1996

Moods...Moments is the debut studio album by American singer Monifah. It was released by Uptown Records on March 26, 1996, in the United States. The album was mostly produced by Heavy D, with additional production by Poke & Tone, Kip Collins, Vincent Herbert, Rheji Burrell, and Spaceman Patterson. It earned positive reviews and reached number 42 on the US Billboard 200 and number 6 on the Top R&B/Hip-Hop Albums.

Three charting singles were released from the album, including "I Miss You (Come Back Home)", "You", and "You Don't Have to Love Me". Lead single "I Miss You (Come Back Home)" was certified Gold, as was the second single "You" which peaked at number 32 on the Billboard Hot 100. The track "Nobody's Body" was featured on the soundtrack to the comedy film To Wong Foo, Thanks For Everything! Julie Newmar (1995).

== Critical reception ==
Professional ratings
Review scores
Source	Rating
AllMusic	4/5 stars
Billboard	(favorable)
Cash Box	(favorable)
Robert Christgau	(dud)
Entertainment Weekly	B
Hartford Courant	(favorable)
Los Angeles Times	2.5/4 stars
People	(favorable)
Rolling Stone	3.5/5 stars
USA Today	3/4 stars

In his review for AllMusic, editor Leo Stanley found that "Monifah's rich voice is the first thing you notice on her debut album, Moods...Moments, and it's the thing that keeps the album afloat through its occasional dull spots [...] For the most part, producer Heavy D provides her with enough first-rate songs to make sure that we not only notice the gift, but that we don't forget it once the album is through, either. [His] songs are varied and soulful, giving her a proper showcase for her prodigous talents. Moods...Moments does have a handful of weak songs and could have benefitted from some trimming, but that doesn't prevent the album from being a simply stellar debut."

== Track listing ==
No.	Title	Writer(s)	Producer(s)	Length
1.	"Intro"	Alfred Antoine; Andre Evans	Antoine; Evans	0:40
2.	"You"	Craig King; Heavy D; Marlon Williams; Rheji Burrell; Vincent Herbert; Marcel Hall	Heavy D	4:23
3.	"It's Alright"	Heavy D	Heavy D	6:08
4.	"You Don't Have to Love Me"	Heavy D; Terri Robinson	Heavy D; Kip Collins^{[a]}	4:34
5.	"Nobody's Body"	Heavy D	Heavy D; Jean-Claude "Poke" Olivier	5:28
6.	"Don't Waste My Time"	Heavy D; Robinson; Johnny Watson	Heavy D; Red Hot Lover Tone	3:49
7.	"Lay with You"	Heavy D	Heavy D; William "Spaceman" Patterson^{[b]}	5:22
8.	"Interlude"	Antoine; Evans	Antoine; Evans	0:49
9.	"I Miss You (Come Back Home)"	Heavy D; Robinson	Heavy D; Collins^{[a]}	3:53
10.	"All I Want"	Antoine; Evans	Antoine; Evans	3:39
11.	"You've Got My Heart"	Burrell; Herbert	Burrell; Herbert	4:42
12.	"Everything You Do"	Olivier; Samuel Barnes; Robinson; Isaac Hayes	Olivier	4:04
13.	"You Should Have Told Me"	Antoine; Evans	Antoine; Evans	4:17
14.	"Jesus Is Love" (featuring Boys Choir of Harlem)	Lionel Richie	Heavy D; Bill Esses; Dave Cintron^{[a]}	6:40
15.	"I Miss You (Come Back Home) (Remix)" (featuring AZ)	Heavy D; Faith Evans; Anthony Cruz; BB Dickerson; Charles Miller; Harold Brown; Howard Scott; Lee Levitin; Papa Dee Allen	Heavy D	3:53
Total length:				62:21

Notes

- ^{^[a]} signifies co-producer

Sample credits

- "You" Contains elements from "Make the Music with Your Mouth, Biz" as performed by Biz Markie.
- "Don't Waste My Time" contains elements from "Superman Lover" as performed by Johnny "Guitar" Watson.
- "Everything You Do" contains elements from "Someone Who Will Take the Place of You" as performed by Isaac Hayes.
- "I Miss You (Come Back Home) (Remix)" contains elements from "Slippin' into Darkness" as by performed by War.

== Charts ==
=== Weekly charts ===
Chart (1996)	Peak position
US Billboard 200	42
US Top R&B/Hip-Hop Albums (Billboard)	6

=== Year-end charts ===
Chart (1996)	Position
US Top R&B/Hip-Hop Albums (Billboard)	62
