= Yvette Michele =

American R&B singer

- Born: Michele Yvette Bryant; December 17, 1968 (age 57); New York City, U.S.
- Genres: R&B; hip hop soul
- Occupations: Singer; songwriter
- Years active: 1996–present
- Labels: Loud; RCA; Franchise

Michele Yvette Bryant (born December 17, 1968), known professionally as Yvette Michele, is an American R&B singer.

== Career ==
Michele released her debut album, My Dream, on August 26, 1997 on the RCA record label. From 1996-1998 she released three Top 20 singles on the US Billboard Hot Dance Music/Maxi-Singles Sales chart, "Everyday & Everynight" (#3), "I'm Not Feeling You" (#5) and "DJ Keep Playin' (Get Your Music On)" (#19).

On March 5, 1997 "I'm Not Feeling You" was awarded the Billboard 'Greatest Gainer Sales' award for the biggest sales gain of the week. Also, she participated in the song "Far From Yours" of the rapper O.C.

== Discography ==
=== Albums ===
- My Dream (1997)

=== Singles ===
| Year | Single | Peak positions | | | |
| Year | Single | US Hot 100 | US R&B/ Hip-Hop | US Dance Singles Sales | UK Singles |
|---|---|---|---|---|---|
| 1996 | "Everyday & Everynight" | 60 | 23 | 3 | — |
| 1997 | "I'm Not Feeling You" | 44 | 12 | 6 | 36 |
| 1997 | "DJ Keep Playin' (Get Your Music On)" | 84 | 36 | 19 | — |
| 1997 | "Far From Yours" O.C. featuring Yvette Michele | 81 | 43 | 23 | — |
| 1997 | "Crazy" | — | — | — | — |
"—" denotes a release that did not chart.
