= Bad Girl (Monifah song) =

1999 single by Monifah

- US promotional artwork

Single by Monifah

from the album Mo'hogany
- Released: June 1999
- Length: 3:45
- Label: Uptown; Universal
- Songwriter(s): Vincent Herbert; Rob Fusari; Mary Brown; Monifah Carter; Queen Pen; Donna Summer; Bruce Sudano; Joe Esposito; Edward Hokenson; Kenny Gamble; Leon Huff; Anthony Jackson
- Producer(s): Rob Fusari

Monifah singles chronology
"Suga Suga" (1998)	"Bad Girl" (1999)	"I Can Tell" (2000)

"Bad Girl (Monifah's Anthem)" is a song by American R&B singer Monifah's, released as a single from her second studio album, Mo'hogany in June 1999 as a double-A sided single with "Suga Suga" in Australia and New Zealand.

== Track listings ==
US promo CD single

1. "Bad Girl (Monifah's Anthem)" (clean version) (featuring Queen Pen) - 3:44
2. "Bad Girl (Monifah's Anthem)" (clean / no rap version) - 2:50
3. "Bad Girl (Monifah's Anthem)" (instrumental) - 3:44

Australian CD single

1. "Suga Suga" (LP version) - 4:41
2. "Suga Suga" (radio edit) - 3:59
3. "Bad Girl (Monifah's Anthem)" (LP version)- 3:44
4. "Bad Girl (Monifah's Anthem)" (Clean version) (featuring Queen Pen) - 3:44
5. "Touch It" (Hooker Mix clean edit) - 4:01

== Charts ==
Weekly chart performance for "Bad Girl"/"Suga Suga"
Chart (1999)	Peak position
Australia (ARIA)	17
New Zealand (Recorded Music NZ)	44
