= Heard It All Before (Sunshine Anderson song) =

2001 single by Sunshine Anderson

Single by Sunshine Anderson

from the album Your Woman
- B-side: "Lunch or Dinner"
- Released: February 27, 2001
- Genre: R&B
- Length: 4:54
- Label: Atlantic; Soulife
- Songwriters: Michael Flowers; Sunshine Anderson; Rayshawn Sherrer; Chris Dawley
- Producer: Mike City

Sunshine Anderson singles chronology
| "Heard It All Before" (2001) | "Lunch or Dinner" (2001) |

"Heard It All Before" is a song by American recording artist Sunshine Anderson, released as the lead single from her debut studio album, Your Woman (2001), on February 27, 2001. It was written by Anderson, Rayshawn Sherrer, Chris Dawley, and Mike City and produced by the latter. Serving as Anderson's debut single, it reached the top 10 on both the UK Singles Chart and the US Billboard Hot R&B/Hip-Hop Singles & Tracks chart while peaking at the number 18 on the Billboard Hot 100.

== Soulife remix ==
In 2006, a remix version of "Heard It All Before" featuring fellow R&B singer Brandy was leaked onto the internet. The duet was recorded during a session when producer Mike City was working with both singers in 2001 but remained unused. In March 2016, City released a high quality version of the duet to his SoundCloud account.

== Track listings ==
US 7-inch single
| No. | Title | Length |
|---|---|---|
| 1. | "Heard It All Before" | 4:55 |
| 2. | "Lunch or Dinner" | 4:55 |

US 12-inch single
| No. | Title | Length |
|---|---|---|
| 1. | "Heard It All Before" (album version) | 4:55 |
| 2. | "Heard It All Before" (instrumental) | 4:55 |
| 3. | "Heard It All Before" (radio version without intro) | 3:58 |
| 4. | "Heard It All Before" (accapella) | 4:42 |

US 12-inch single (remixes)
| No. | Title | Length |
|---|---|---|
| 1. | "Heard It All Before" (E-Smoove House Filter mix) | 7:33 |
| 2. | "Heard It All Before" (E-Smoove Filter dub) | 7:19 |
| 3. | "Heard It All Before" (Ben Watt Lazy Dog mix) | 8:12 |
| 4. | "Heard It All Before" (Ben Watt Lazy Dog Bonus Beats) | 1:23 |

UK CD single
| No. | Title | Length |
|---|---|---|
| 1. | "Heard It All Before" (radio edit) | 3:57 |
| 2. | "Heard It All Before" (album version) | 4:54 |
| 3. | "Heard It All Before" (instrumental) | 4:55 |
| 4. | "Heard It All Before" (acapella) | 4:44 |
| 5. | "Heard It All Before" (enhanced video) |

UK 12-inch single and Australian CD single
| No. | Title | Length |
|---|---|---|
| 1. | "Heard It All Before" (radio edit) | 3:57 |
| 2. | "Heard It All Before" (album version) | 4:54 |
| 3. | "Heard It All Before" (instrumental) | 4:55 |
| 4. | "Heard It All Before" (acapella) | 4:44 |

UK cassette single and European CD single
| No. | Title | Length |
|---|---|---|
| 1. | "Heard It All Before" (radio edit) | 3:57 |
| 2. | "Heard It All Before" (album version) | 4:54 |

== Personnel ==
Personnel are adapted from the liner notes of Your Woman.

- Engineering – Jesse "Biz" Stewart, Ryan Wirthlin
- Mastering – Brian Gardner
- Mixing – Larry Furgerrson, Manny Marroquin
- Mixing assistance – Andy Gunn, Ian Blanch
- Production – Mike City

== Charts ==
=== Weekly charts ===
| Chart (2001) | Peak position |
|---|---|
| Europe (Eurochart Hot 100) | 47 |
| Netherlands (Single Top 100) | 98 |
| Scottish Singles Sales (Official Charts) | 22 |
| UK Singles (Official Charts) | 9 |
| UK Dance (Official Charts) | 8 |
| UK Hip Hop/R&B (Official Charts) | 4 |
| US Billboard Hot 100 | 18 |
| US Dance Club Songs (Billboard) | 11 |
| US Dance Singles Sales (Billboard) | 25 |
| US Hot R&B/Hip-Hop Songs (Billboard) | 3 |
| US Rhythmic Airplay (Billboard) | 23 |

=== Year-end charts ===
| Chart (2001) | Position |
|---|---|
| UK Singles (OCC) | 150 |
| UK Urban (Music Week) | 1 |
| US Billboard Hot 100 | 64 |
| US Hot R&B/Hip-Hop Singles & Tracks (Billboard) | 10 |
| US Rhythmic Top 40 (Billboard) | 87 |

== Certifications ==
| Region | Certification | Certified units/sales |
|---|---|---|
| New Zealand (RMNZ) | Gold | 15,000^{‡} |
| United Kingdom (BPI) | Silver | 200,000^{‡} |
^{‡} Sales+streaming figures based on certification alone.

== Release history ==
| Region | Date | Format(s) | Label(s) | Ref. |
|---|---|---|---|---|
| United States | February 27, 2001 | 12-inch vinyl | Atlantic; Soulife | |
| United States | March 6, 2001 | Rhythmic contemporary; urban radio | Atlantic; Soulife | |
| United States | May 1, 2001 | Contemporary hit radio | Atlantic; Soulife | |
| Australia | May 21, 2001 | CD | Atlantic; Soulife | |
| United Kingdom | May 21, 2001 | CD | Atlantic; Soulife | |
