= Far from Yours =

"Far From Yours"

Single by O.C. featuring Yvette Michele

from the album Jewelz
- Released: July 1997
- Recorded: 1997
- Studio: Unique Recording Studios (New York, NY)
- Genre: Hip hop
- Length: 4:04
- Label: PayDay; FFRR
- Songwriter(s): Omar Credle; Michelle Bryant; Anthony Best; George Johnson; Louis Johnson; Eric Barrier; William Griffin
- Producer(s): Buckwild

O.C. singles chronology
"My World" (1997)	"Far From Yours" (1997)	"Can't Go Wrong" (1997)

Yvette Michele singles chronology
"DJ Keep Playin' (Get Your Music On)" (1997)	"Far From Yours" (1997)	"Crazy" (1997)

Music video
- "Far From Yours" on YouTube

"Far From Yours" is a song by American rapper O.C. featuring American R&B singer Yvette Michele. It was released in July 1997 via Payday/FFRR Records as the second single from O.C.'s second solo studio album Jewelz. Recording sessions took place at Unique Recording Studios in New York. Production was handled by Buckwild, who utilizes samples from "Tomorrow" by The Brothers Johnson and "For the Listeners" by Eric B. & Rakim.

The single peaked at number 81 on the Billboard Hot 100, number 43 on the Hot R&B/Hip-Hop Songs, number 23 on the Dance Singles Sales and number 12 on the Hot Rap Songs in the United States. Billboard magazine remarked: "easy-paced jeep groove with an on-point rap that leaves the listener salivating for much more".

== Track listing ==
No.	Title	Writer(s)	Producer(s)	Length
1.	"Far From Yours" (Clean)	Omar Credle; Michelle Bryant; Anthony Best; George Johnson; Louis Johnson; Eric Barrier; William Griffin	Buckwild	4:04
2.	"Far From Yours" (Instrumental)		Buckwild	4:18
3.	"Far From Yours" (Not So Clean)		Buckwild	4:18
4.	"My World" (Clean)	Credle; Christopher E. Martin	DJ Premier	4:16
5.	"My World" (Street)		DJ Premier	4:16
6.	"My World" (Instrumental)		DJ Premier	4:16

== Personnel ==
- Omar "O.C." Credle – vocals
- Yvette Michele – vocals
- Anthony "Buckwild" Best – producer, mixing
- Ken "Duro" Ifill – engineering
- Tony Dawsey – mastering
- Mr. Dave Sumpter – executive producer, A&R
- Patrick Moxey – executive producer
- Gregory Burke – art direction
- Brian "B+" Cross – photography

== Charts ==
Chart (1997)	Peak position
US Billboard Hot 100	81
US Hot R&B/Hip-Hop Songs (Billboard)	43
US Hot Rap Songs (Billboard)	12
US Hot Dance Music/Maxi-Singles Sales (Billboard)	23
