= Armaghetto =

Studio album by Channel Live
- Released: July 18, 2000
- Recorded: 1999–2000
- Studio: Studio 57 (New York); The Weight Room (New York)
- Genre: Hip hop
- Length: 54:45
- Label: Flavor Unit
- Producer: Queen Latifah (exec.); Shakim Compere (exec.); Buddah; Channel Live; Chuckie Madness; Mike City; Poison Ivy; Shamello

Channel Live chronology
Station Identification (1995)	Armaghetto (2000)	Secret Science Rap (2006)

Singles from Armaghetto
- 1. "Wild Out 2K" Released: May 9, 2000

Professional ratings
Review scores
Source	Rating
AllMusic	2.5/5 stars
RapReviews	5/10

Armaghetto is the second studio album by American hip hop duo Channel Live. It was released on July 18, 2000, through Flavor Unit Records. Recording sessions took place at Studio 57 and at the Weight Room in New York. Production was handled by Mike City, Poison Ivy, Buddah, Shamello, Chuckie Madness, and Channel Live themselves. It features guest appearances from Akbar, Benny Boom, Carl Thomas, Black Opz, Black Rob, Malik Yusef, Method Man, Ms. Toi, Rowdy Rahz and Spanish Fly. The album itself failed to make it to the US Billboard charts, but the single "Wild Out 2K" did make it to No. 48 on the Hot Rap Singles chart.

== Track listing ==
No.	Title	Writer(s)	Producer(s)	Length
1.	"Respect This"	Hokiem Green; Vincent Morgan; Michael Flowers	Mike City	3:48
2.	"Wild Out 2k"	Green; Morgan; Flowers	Mike City	4:15
3.	"The Nerve"	Green; Morgan; Flowers	Poison Ivy	4:17
4.	"Turn It Up" (featuring Black Opz)	Green; Morgan; Black Opz	Poison Ivy	4:00
5.	"Lies & Rumors" (featuring Carl Thomas)	Green; Morgan; Carlton Thomas; Flowers	Mike City	2:57
6.	"Temptation" (featuring Black Rob)	Green; Morgan; Robert Ross; Flowers	Mike City	4:42
7.	"F.A.T. (Fucking a Thug)"	Green; Morgan	Chuckie Madness	3:50
8.	"Put It on a Nigga" (featuring Ms. Toi)	Green; Morgan; Toikeon Parham	Budda; Shamello	3:20
9.	"Wild Horse" (featuring Carl Thomas)	Green; Morgan	Budda; Shamello	3:14
10.	"Say What" (featuring Benny Boom, Akbar and Spanish Fly)	Green; Morgan; Clarence Douglas; Akbar Youngblood; F. Elliot	Mike City	3:07
11.	"Ghetto B.I." (featuring Method Man, Rowdy Rahz and Malik Yusef)	Green; Morgan; Clifford Smith; Rashon Brinson; Malik Yusef	Channel Live	4:20
12.	"Armaghetto" (featuring Akbar)	Green; Morgan; Youngblood	Mike City	4:22
13.	"F.C.C. Alert (Fuck Crooked Cops)" (featuring Benny Boom)	Green; Morgan; Douglas	Mike City	4:48
14.	"The God U Know"	Green; Morgan	Channel Live	3:45
Total length:				54:45

== Personnel ==
- Hakim Green – main artist, producer (tracks: 11, 14)
- Vincent "Tuffy" Morgan – main artist, producer (tracks: 11, 14)
- Black Opz – featured artist (track 4)
- Carl Thomas – featured artist (tracks: 5, 9)
- Robert "Black Rob" Ross – featured artist (track 6)
- Toikeon "Ms. Toi" Parham – featured artist (track 8)
- Akbar Youngblood – featured artist (tracks: 10, 12)
- Clarence "Benny Boom" Douglas – featured artist (tracks: 10, 13)
- F. "Spanish Fly" Elliot – featured artist (track 10)
- Clifford "Method Man" Smith – featured artist (track 11)
- Rashon "Rowdy Rahz" Brinson – featured artist (track 11)
- Malik Yusef – featured artist (track 11)
- Michael "Mike City" Flowers – producer (tracks: 1, 2, 5, 6, 10, 12, 13)
- Poison Ivy – producer (tracks: 3, 4)
- Charles "Chuckie Madness" Shaw – producer (track 7)
- Roger "Buddah" Munroe – producer (tracks: 8, 9)
- Darrol "Shamello" Durant – producer (tracks: 8, 9)
- Dana "Queen Latifah" Owens – additional vocals (track 6), executive producer
- Sha-Kim Compere – executive producer
- Hernan Santiago – recording (tracks: 1–7, 9–14), mixing (tracks: 1, 3, 4, 6, 7, 9–14)
- Patrick Dillett – mixing (track 2)
- Steve Sisco – engineering assistant (track 2)
- David Kennedy – mixing (track 8)
- Darryl "Latee" French – co-executive producer
- Dedra Tate – co-executive producer
