= DJ Keep Playin' (Get Your Music On) =

Single by Yvette Michele

from the album My Dream
- Released: 1997
- Recorded: 1997
- Genre: R&B
- Label: Loud
- Songwriter(s): Curt Bedeau, Gerry Charles, Hugh L Clarke, Brian George, Lucien George, Paul George, Eddie Thomas
- Producer(s): Full Force

Yvette Michele singles chronology
"I'm Not Feeling You" (1997)	"DJ Keep Playin' (Get Your Music On)" (1997)	"Far From Yours" (1997)

Music video
- "DJ Keep Playin' (Get Your Music On)" on YouTube

"DJ Keep Playin' (Get Your Music On)" is the title of a top twenty dance single by Yvette Michele. Produced by Full Force the single spent twenty weeks on the US Billboard R&B singles chart.

The official music video for the song was directed by Brian Luvar; and it made the top twenty of the BET most-played music video chart.

== Chart positions ==
Chart (1998)	Peak position
U.S. Billboard Hot 100	84
U.S. Billboard Hot R&B Singles	36
U.S. Billboard Hot Dance Singles Sales	19
