= Station Identification (album) =

Studio album by Channel Live
- Released: March 21, 1995
- Recorded: 1993–94
- Studio: The Crib (New York, NY); Palm Tree Studios
- Genre: Hip hop
- Length: 46:00
- Label: Capitol
- Producer: KRS-One (also exec.); Rheji Burrell; Salaam Remi

Channel Live chronology
Station Identification (1995)	Armaghetto (2000)

Singles from Station Identification
- 1. "Mad Izm" Released: December 6, 1994; 2. "Reprogram" Released: 1995; 3. "Sex For The Sport" Released: August 1, 1995

Professional ratings
Review scores
Source	Rating
AllMusic	3/5 stars
The Source	3/5 stars

Station Identification is the first studio album by American hip hop duo Channel Live. It was released on March 21, 1995, via Capitol Records. The recording sessions took place at The Crib in New York City and at Palm Tree Studios. It was produced by KRS-One, Salaam Remi, and Rheji Burrell. The album debuted at number 58 on the Billboard 200 and number 9 on the Top R&B/Hip-Hop Albums.

The album is best known for its lead single, "Mad Izm", which was a collaboration with KRS-One. The song became Channel Live's highest chart appearance, peaking at number 54 on the Billboard Hot 100 and number three on the Hot Rap Singles. The track was remixed by D.I.T.C.'s Buckwild for his 2007 compilation album Rare Studio Masters' as track one on disc one. "Reprogram" reached number 31 on the Maxi-Singles chart.

== Track listing ==
No.	Title	Writer(s)	Producer(s)	Length
1.	"Station Identification"	Hokiem Green; Vincent Morgan; Rheji Burrell	Rheji Burrell	4:39
2.	"Channel 1"		KRS-One	0:34
3.	"Lock It Up"	Green; Morgan; Salaam Remi	Salaam Remi	3:31
4.	"Channel 2"		KRS-One	0:24
5.	"What! (Cause and Effect)"	Green; Morgan; Lawrence Parker	KRS-One	2:57
6.	"Mad Izm" (featuring KRS-One)	Green; Morgan; Parker	KRS-One	4:16
7.	"Reprogram"	Green; Morgan; Parker	KRS-One	3:51
8.	"Channel 3"		KRS-One	0:52
9.	"Sex For the Sport"	Green; Morgan; Burrell	Rheji Burrell	5:02
10.	"Channel 4"		KRS-One	0:37
11.	"Down Goes the Devil"	Green; Morgan; Parker	KRS-One	3:32
12.	"Build & Destroy"	Green; Morgan; Parker	KRS-One	2:21
13.	"Alpha & Omega"	Green; Morgan; Remi	Salaam Remi	4:47
14.	"Homicide Ride"	Green; Morgan; Remi	Salaam Remi	4:38
15.	"Who U Represent"	Green; Morgan; Parker	KRS-One	3:59
Total length:				46:00

== Charts ==
Chart (1995)	Peak position
US Billboard 200	58
US Top R&B Albums (Billboard)	9
