= Touch It (Monifah song) =

1998 single by Monifah

Single by Monifah

from the album Mo'hogany
- Released: July 21, 1998
- Length: 4:45
- Label: Uptown; Universal
- Songwriters: Screwface; Jack Knight; John Guldberg; Tim Stahl
- Producer: Jack Knight

Monifah singles chronology
"I Still Love You" (1997)	"Touch It" (1998)	"Bad Girl" (1999)

Music video
- "Touch It" on YouTube

"Touch It" is the lead single from American R&B singer Monifah's second album, Mo'hogany. The song was produced and written by Jack Knight and Screwface. It uses a sample of Laid Back's 1983 hit "White Horse", so songwriters Tim Stahl and John Guldberg are given writing credits.

Released as a single on July 21, 1998, the song became a worldwide hit, charting within the top 20 in Australia, Belgium, and Canada. In the United States, it peaked at number nine on both the Billboard Hot 100 and Billboard Hot R&B Singles charts, giving Monifah her highest-peaking single in the US. The song's music video features Monifah performing the song in front of the United States Armed Forces.

== Track listings ==
US CD and cassette single, Australian CD single

1. "Touch It" (radio edit)
2. "Touch It" (album version)
3. "Suga Suga" (snippet)
4. "Fallin' in Love" (snippet)
5. "Better Half of Me" (snippet)

US 12-inch single

1. "Touch It" (LP version) — 4:46
2. "Touch It" (clean LP version) — 4:47
3. "Touch It" (instrumental) — 4:35

UK CD and 12-inch single

1. "Touch It" (clean radio edit)
2. "Touch It" (Clark Kent remix)
3. "Touch It" (Ignorants remix)
4. "Touch It" (Maurice Joshua main edit)

UK cassette single and European CD single

1. "Touch It" (clean radio edit)
2. "Touch It" (Clark Kent remix)

== Charts ==
=== Weekly charts ===
Chart (1998–1999)	Peak position
Australia (ARIA)	5
Belgium (Ultratop 50 Flanders)	7
Belgium (Ultratop 50 Wallonia)	15
Canada (Nielsen SoundScan)	14
Canada Top Singles (RPM)	15
Canada Dance/Urban (RPM)	3
Europe (Eurochart Hot 100)	66
Netherlands (Dutch Top 40)	27
Netherlands (Single Top 100)	24
New Zealand (Recorded Music NZ)	27
Scottish Singles Sales (Official Charts)	98
UK Singles (Official Charts)	29
UK Dance (Official Charts)	14
UK Hip Hop/R&B (Official Charts)	6
US Billboard Hot 100	9
US Hot R&B Singles (Billboard)	9
US Rhythmic Top 40 (Billboard)	1
US Top 40 Tracks (Billboard)	13

=== Year-end charts ===
Chart (1998)	Position
Canada (Nielsen SoundScan)	100
UK Urban (Music Week)	38
US Billboard Hot 100	77
US Hot R&B Singles (Billboard)	63
US Rhythmic Top 40 (Billboard)	23

Chart (1999)	Position
Australia (ARIA)	30
Belgium (Ultratop 50 Flanders)	54
Belgium (Ultratop 50 Wallonia)	65
Netherlands (Dutch Top 40)	145
US Mainstream Top 40 (Billboard)	54
US Rhythmic Top 40 (Billboard)	45

== Certifications ==
Region	Certification	Certified units/sales
Australia (ARIA)	Platinum	70,000^{^}
Belgium (BRMA)	Gold	25,000^{*}
^{*} Sales figures based on certification alone.^{^} Shipments figures based on certification alone.

== Release history ==
Region	Date	Format(s)	Label(s)	Ref.
United States	July 21, 1998	Rhythmic contemporary radio	Uptown; Universal	
United States	July 21, 1998	12-inch vinyl; CD; cassette	Uptown; Universal	
United States	July 28, 1998	Urban radio	Uptown; Universal	
United States	August 11, 1998	Contemporary hit radio	Uptown; Universal	
United Kingdom	January 18, 1999	12-inch vinyl; CD; cassette	Universal	

== Cover versions and samples ==
- 2001: Mytown sampled the lyrics referencing Jack Knight and Dakoda House in "Party All Night" from their self-titled album
- 2003: Dannii Minogue sampled the song and the 1983 original "White Horse" by Laid Back on the track "Push" from the album Neon Nights
- 2014: Nena Buddemeier (ft. DJ Tomekk)
