= Everyday & Everynight =

Single by Yvette Michele

from the album My Dream
- Released: 1995
- Recorded: 1995
- Genre: R&B
- Label: Loud Records
- Songwriter(s): Michele Yvette, Aston Taylor

Yvette Michele singles chronology
"Everyday & Everynight" (1995)	"I'm Not Feeling You" (1997)

Music video
- "Everyday & Everynight" on YouTube

"Everyday & Everynight" is the title of a top five dance single by Yvette Michele. According to Billboard, the single is considered "a club classic".

== Charts ==
Chart (1996)	Peak position
U.S. Billboard Billboard Hot 100	60
U.S. Billboard Hot R&B Singles	23
U.S. Billboard Dance Single Sales	3
