= Jack Knight (songwriter) =

American songwriter and producer (born 1973)

- Born: July 8, 1973 (age 51)
- Origin: East New York, Brooklyn, United States
- Genres: Pop, hip hop, R&B, urban
- Occupation(s): Singer-songwriter, record producer, entrepreneur
- Years active: 1995–present
- Labels: Def Jam Recordings, Bad Boy Records, Universal Music Group

Jack Knight (a.k.a. KNZY pronounced KEN-ZEE), is an American songwriter and producer. He is known for his contributions to the hip-hop and R&B genres.

== Early career ==
Originally from Brooklyn, New York, Knight moved with his grandparents to Chesapeake, Virginia, at the age of 17. As a teenager, he performed in a local rap group, and then signed as a solo artist to Def Jam Recordings in 1995. His voice was first heard on Monifah's Touch It, but he has been a songwriter since 1996.

== Publications and academies ==
In 2006, Knight published his book, The Art of Writing A Hit Song: The Urban Experience. Additionally, he founded the Jack Knight Songwriters Academy, a platform dedicated to educating young aspiring songwriters.

== Recent ventures ==
Knight produced music with his record label Made In East New York. The label recently joined with EMPIRE. One of the most notable achievements is the co-production of "TOUCH IT" by Ghanaian artist Star KiDi. The song, released under Made In East New York, went viral on TikTok, and received remixes by Tyga and Tulsi Kumar from T-Series.

== Selected songwriting discography ==
=== 1997 ===
- Virgin by Chico DeBarge

=== 1998 ===
- Touch It
- Shorty (You Keep Playin' with My Mind) by Imajin

=== 1999 ===
- Sittin' Home by Total (girl group)

=== 2001 ===
- Can't Believe (feat. Carl Thomas) by Faith Evans
- Dance With Me by Jennifer Lopez
- Walking On Sunshine by Jennifer Lopez
- I Need A Girl Part 1 (feat. Usher & Loon) by Sean Combs

=== 2005 ===
- Kronik (feat. Snoop Dogg) by Lil' Kim
- Hustler's Story (feat. Akon, Scarface (rapper), Big Gee) by The Notorious B.I.G.

=== 2006 ===
- Tell Me (feat. Christina Aguilera)

=== 2007 ===
- Let It Go

=== 2012 ===
- Live Like A Warrior by Matisyahu

=== 2015 ===
- Last Night (feat. Keyshia Cole) by Sean Combs
- Old Thing Back (feat. The Notorious B.I.G. and Ja Rule) by Matoma

=== 2019 ===
- U Say (feat. 6lack) by The Bonfyre
