= Something I Wanna Give You =

Single by Sunshine Anderson

from the album Sunshine At Midnight
- Released: December 5, 2006
- Recorded: 2006
- Genre: R&B
- Length: 3:46 (album version)
- Label: Shining Star, Music World Entertainment
- Songwriter(s): Sunshine Anderson

Sunshine Anderson singles chronology
"'Lunch or Dinner'" (2001)	"Something I Wanna Give You" (2006)	"'Force of Nature'" (2007)

Something I Wanna Give You is a song by Sunshine Anderson. The song was used as the lead single of her second album, Sunshine at Midnight.

== Background ==
The song was written by Sunshine Anderson and released on December 5, 2006. This song was the first single from Sunshine Anderson in five years as well as her first single on Music World Entertainment and her own record label Shining Star. Leading a 12-track disc, the midtempo single charted at #80 on Hot R&B charts. The song uses horns and drums as the main instruments of the song.

== Music video ==
The music video starts with a man in Anderson's house, who later begins to sit on her couch. He later puts in a videotape containing a message by Sunshine Anderson. On the tape, is the music video by Sunshine Anderson telling her man that he had made, he couldn't due what takes to her, and giving him the message through no hesitation. The video was shot August 2006 in Los Angeles and was directed by Gil Green.

== Lyrical Content ==
The song mainly takes about Sunshine Anderson telling a man to leave due to fact of temper issues, changing the way Anderson was treated, and not satisfying Anderson. Anderson also stated that it was no walk park being his girl. The song was also used by Sunshine Anderson as an anthem for women. The chorus of the song leads to Sunshine Anderson singing,

There's something that I wanna give you,
And I'm giving to you through no hestitation,
I'm giving freedom boy to go,
There's something that I wanna give you

== Track listing ==
- CD single
1. Main - 3:45
2. Instrumental 4:20
3. Acapella - 4:18
