= I'm Not Feeling You =

Single by Yvette Michele

from the album My Dream
- Released: March 1997
- Recorded: 1996
- Genre: R&B, Hip Hop Soul
- Label: Loud Records
- Songwriters: Michele Yvette, Aston Taylor, Harvey Fuqua, Sylvester James

Yvette Michele singles chronology
"Everyday & Everynight" (1995)	"I'm Not Feeling You" (1997)	"DJ Keep Playin' (Get Your Music On)" (1997)

Music video
- "I'm Not Feeling You" on YouTube

"I'm Not Feeling You" is the title of a top ten dance single by Yvette Michele. It is based on a sample from the Sylvester song "Was It Something That I Said" from 1978 as well as Public Enemy's “Public Enemy No. 1.” The track is also based on Oran "Juice" Jones single "The Rain". Billboard magazine called the single "a fierce debut hit".

== Charts ==
=== Weekly charts ===
Chart (1997)	Peak position
US Billboard Hot 100	45
US Dance Club Songs (Billboard)	12
US Hot R&B/Hip-Hop Songs (Billboard)	12

=== Year-end charts ===
Chart (1997)	Position
UK Urban (Music Week)	5
US Hot R&B/Hip-Hop Songs (Billboard)	66
