= Keep Smiling (album) =

Studio album by Laid Back
- Released: 1983
- Recorded: 1982
- Genres: Pop, synth-pop, new wave
- Length: 39:26
- Labels: EMI Music Denmark; Sire/Warner Bros. (US)

Laid Back chronology
Laid Back (1981)	Keep Smiling (1983)	Play It Straight (1985)

Keep Smiling is the second studio album released by the Danish pop group Laid Back.

== Track listing ==
1. "Elevator Boy" - 4:55
2. "Slowmotion Girl" - 5:51
3. "White Horse" - 4:42
4. "So Wie So" - 4:31
5. "High Society Girl" - 3:36
6. "Don't Be Mean" - 3:21
7. "Sunshine Reggae" - 4:16
8. "Fly Away (Walking in the Sunshine)" - 8:28

== Vinyl LP track listing ==
Side one

1. "White Horse" — 4:42
2. "Elevator Boy" — 4:55
3. "Slowmotion Girl" — 5:51
4. "So Wie So" — 4:32

Side two

1. "Sunshine Reggae" — 4:15
2. "High Society Girl" — 3:41
3. "Don't Be Mean" — 3:22
4. "Fly Away/Walking in the Sunshine" — 8:35

== Credits ==
- Produced by Laid Back and the 7 Dwarfs. Words & Music by Tim Stahl & John Guldberg. Sing A Song Publishing.
- All voices, sounds and instruments by Tim Stahl and John Guldberg, except Frank Marstokk: drums on "Elevator Boy", "So Wie So", "High Society Girl", "Sunshine Reggae". Jeppe Repurth: drums on " High Society Girl". Jorgen Thomsen: backing vocals on "Slowmotion Girl", Don't Be Mean". Peter Hansen: bass on "Sunshine Reggae". Romano Moszkowicz: good vibes. Additional instruments supplied by Drumstick, Fangel Music, Musikplaneten, Super Sound.
- All songs recorded & mixed at Laid Back Studio, Copenhagen, Denmark; Engineer: Gis Ingvardtsen, except "Elevator Boy" remixed at Puk Studio, Randers, Denmark; Engineer: John "Puk" Quist.
- Cover by Varab-Stegelmann Studio, Photos: Fancois Granjan & Dick Neil, Artwork: Ingo Milton, Palm by Clive Homes.
- Management: Wennick Bros.
- Thanks to the crew at Easy Sound & Werner Studio; and the Medley Team.
