= Laid Back =

Danish band

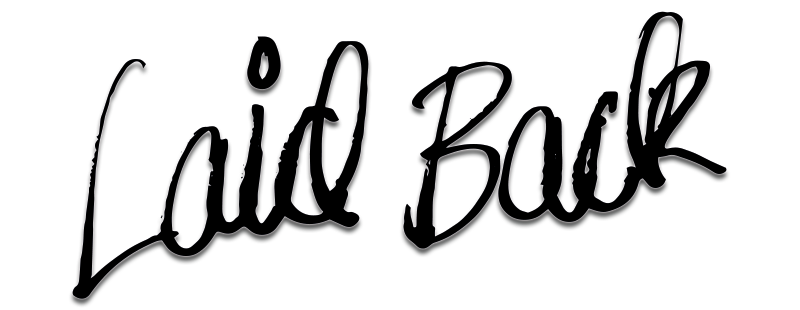
- Logo

Background information
- Origin: Copenhagen, Denmark
- Genres: Electro, synth-pop, post-disco, new wave
- Years active: 1979–present
- Labels: Ultraphone, Medley, Sire, Ariola, Sundance, FLEX, Brother
- Members: John Guldberg; Tim Stahl
- Website: www.laidback.dk

Laid Back is a Danish electronic music duo group from Copenhagen, formed in 1979. The duo consists of John Guldberg (vocals, guitar, bass) and Tim Stahl (vocals, keyboards, drums, bass). They are best known for the hits "Sunshine Reggae", "White Horse", from 1983, and "Bakerman", from 1989.

== Background and origins ==
John Guldberg and Tim Stahl met in the mid-1970s, and they played together in a group called the Starbox Band. After a poorly received show supporting the Kinks, the band split up, but the duo continued working together. Guldberg set up a small studio in downtown Copenhagen where the two musicians began exploring the possibilities that were being opened up by new technologies, such as multitrack tape recorders, synthesizers and drum machines.

== Recordings ==
=== 1981–89 ===
"White Horse" by Laid Back
First released in 1983 as a B-side of the single "Sunshine Reggae", this song is one of the group's most memorable tracks and their breakthrough hit in America.

Their debut album, simply titled Laid Back, was released in 1981, and the single "Maybe I'm Crazy" became a number-one hit in Denmark.

The single "Sunshine Reggae", released the next year, became another chart-topper in their home country; it was later included on the band's second album, Keep Smiling, in 1983, and went on to become a number-one single in Italy, West Germany, and nineteen other countries around the world. In the US, however, it was the single's B-side that became the band's only big hit. "White Horse" is a funk-influenced dance track with a memorable bassline and ambiguous, drug- and/or sex-themed lyrics ("white horse" being a slang for heroin) that became popular in US clubs. After the song was re-released as an A-side on both 7-inch and 12-inch vinyl, it went on to spend three weeks at number one on Billboard's National Disco Action charts; it was also a crossover success, reaching the top five on the Hot Black Singles chart while peaking at number 26 on the Billboard Hot 100 in early 1984. Its relatively poor performance on the Hot 100 is most likely due to the track's controversial lyrics (including the word "bitch"), which prevented it from receiving radio airplay in much of the country. In 1989, the American rap act 2 Live Crew sampled "White Horse" heavily for their single "Get the Fuck Out of My House"; it was later sampled for Monifah's 1998 hit "Touch It".

Laid Back's next two albums, Play It Straight (1985) and See You in the Lobby (1987), and singles such as "Abu Dhabi" and "Tricky Kind of Thing", were released to little fanfare and limited chart success.

The duo made a return to the European charts in 1989 with the single "Bakerman" (featuring Danish singer Hanne Boel), which peaked at number nine on the West German chart, and number 44 in the United Kingdom in early 1990. It was accompanied by an unusual video, directed by Lars von Trier, which featured the band skydiving while "playing" their instruments. Guldberg and Stahl have both named this their favourite Laid Back track, and said the words were written by Guldberg during the recording session for the song. The lyrics are in English except for the phrase "Sagabona kunjani wena", which Guldberg has described as a Swahili phrase meaning "Hello, how are you?"

Hoping to capitalize on the success of "Bakerman", their label re-released "White Horse" (as "White Horse '89") with new remixes, although this was a commercial disappointment.

=== Later work ===
Over the course of the following decades, Laid Back released several albums and singles. The duo also composed the soundtrack of the 2001 feature film Flyvende Farmor, for which they were awarded a Robert, the Danish equivalent of an Oscar. That same year, an exhibition of the band's artwork, including pieces that appeared on their records and promotional posters, took place in Copenhagen. In 2003 they featured on the track "Tango" by Danish band Hæst, produced by Umpff. A remix of "Bakerman" by British DJ Shaun Baker reached number one in Greenland in 2006.

In 2010, "Cocaine Cool" was the first single to be released on Laid Back's own label, Brother Music. It was followed by the mini album Cosyland and the instrumental album Cosmic Vibes in 2012. In 2013, Laid Back released the double album "Uptimistic Music".

In 2019, Laid Back received the prestigious Danish award "Pioneer of the Year" (Årets Steppeulv) for their many years of contribution to the international music scene. 2019 was a special year for Laid Back marking 40 years of making music in the same studio in Copenhagen, the studio where it all began. Laid Back celebrated their anniversary by releasing their 12th studio album "Healing Feeling".

In 2023, Laid Back released the 21-track studio album, Road to Fame. For the second time in the band's history, they released a song in their native language: it was called "Mig" ("Me"). Their first song in Danish was "Flyvende Farmor" ("The flying granny") from 2001.

They continue to make sporadic live performances as well. In 2023, Laid Back made a guest performance at Roskilde Festival with Free Nationals.

== Legacy ==
In 2008, the band MGMT performed a cover of the Laid Back song "Roger" on the Morning Becomes Eclectic music program on KCRW radio, and also played the song at concerts.

== Discography ==
=== Albums ===
- Laid Back (1981)
- Keep Smiling (1983)
- Play It Straight (1985)
- See You in the Lobby (1987)
- Hole in the Sky (1990)
- Why Is Everybody in Such a Hurry (1993)
- Laidest Greatest (1995)
- Unfinished Symphonies (1999)
- Happy Dreamer (1999)
- Good Vibes – The Very Best of Laid Back (2008)
- Cosmic Vibes (2011)
- Cosyland (2012)
- Uptimistic Music (2013)
- Healing Feeling (2019)
- Road To Fame (2023)
- Forevergreen (2024)
- Born to Fly (2026)

=== Singles ===
Year	Title	Peak chart positions													Album
Year	Title	DEN	AUS	NED	BEL (FLA)	GER	AUT	SWI	SWE	UK	NZ	US	US R&B	US Dance	Album
1980	"Maybe I'm Crazy"	2	—	—	—	—	—	—	—	—	—	—	—	—	Laid Back
1981	"China Girl"	—	—	—	—	—	—	—	—	—	—	—	—	—	Laid Back
1981	"Bolivia"	3	—	—	—	—	—	—	—	—	—	—	—	—	Laid Back
1981	"Night Train Boogie"	—	—	—	—	—	—	—	—	—	—	—	—	—	Laid Back
1983	"Sunshine Reggae"	1	56	4	4	1	1	9	—	—	—	—	—	—	...Keep Smiling
1983	"High Society Girl"	2	—	—	—	9	—	—	—	—	—	—	—	—	...Keep Smiling
1984	"White Horse"	—	—	15	18	—	—	—	—	90	49	26	5	1	...Keep Smiling
1984	"Elevatorboy"	4	—	—	—	—	—	—	—	—	—	—	—	—	...Keep Smiling
1985	"One Life"	—	—	—	—	—	—	—	—	—	—	—	—	10	Play It Straight
1986	"I'm Hooked"	—	—	—	—	—	—	—	—	—	—	—	—	—	Play It Straight
1987	"It's a Shame"	—	—	—	—	—	—	—	—	—	—	—	—	—	See You in the Lobby
1987	"Party At The White House"	—	—	—	—	—	—	—	—	—	—	—	—	—	See You in the Lobby
1987	"So This Is X●Mas"	10	—	—	—	—	—	—	—	—	—	—	—	—	Singles only
1989	"White Horse '89"	—	—	—	—	—	—	—	—	81	—	—	—	—	Singles only
1989	"Bakerman"	—	—	20	27	9	1	10	13	44	—	—	—	—	Hole in the Sky
1990	"Bet It on You"	—	—	—	—	—	—	—	—	—	—	—	—	—	Hole in the Sky
1990	"Highway of Love"	—	—	—	—	59	—	—	—	—	—	—	—	—	Hole in the Sky
1993	"I Can't Live Without Love"	—	—	—	—	—	—	—	—	—	—	—	—	—	Why Is Everybody in Such a Hurry!
1993	"Groovie Train"	—	—	—	—	—	—	—	—	—	—	—	—	—	Why Is Everybody in Such a Hurry!
1995	"We Don't Do It"	—	—	—	—	—	—	—	—	—	—	—	—	—	Laidest Greatest
1999	"Key to Life"	—	—	—	—	—	—	—	—	—	—	—	—	—	Unfinished Symphonies
2000	"Feels Like Heaven"	—	—	—	—	—	—	—	—	—	—	—	—	—	Unfinished Symphonies
2000	"Sunshine Reggae 2000"	7	—	35	—	68	—	64	—	—	—	—	—	—	Single only
2003	"Beautiful Day"	—	—	—	—	—	—	—	—	—	—	—	—	—	Happy Dreamer
2006	"Bakerman" (as Shaun Baker feat. Laid Back)	—	—	—	—	39	44	90	—	—	—	—	—	—	Singles only
2010	"Cocaine Cool"	—	—	—	—	—	—	—	—	—	—	—	—	—	Singles only
"—" denotes releases that did not chart or were not released.

== See also ==
- List of artists who reached number one on the U.S. Dance Club Songs chart
