= Rheji Burrell =

American musician

Rheji Burrell is an American dance musician and music producer. With his twin brother Ronald (or Rhano), Burrell was responsible for creating experimental, deep house music in the late 1980s and early 1990s. Much of Burrell's house music output was on the Nu Groove record label, which the brothers founded, often under various aliases, such as 'New York House'n Authority', 'Tech Trax Inc' and 'Utopia Project'.

The brothers had a background in gospel music, and joined the group Inner Spirit as 13-year-olds. They won first place for four consecutive years in the New Jersey Teen Arts Festival, and developed their technical and playing skills on a four-track recorder. The duo earned their first recording deal with Virgin Records in the late 80s. In the early 90s, the Burrells co-founded the Nu Groove record label, responsible for inspiring and launching the careers of several major DJs, re-mixers, and dance music artists.

In the mid 1990s, the Burrell Brothers became successful producers of Hip-Hop, Rap, R&B and Pop music. Today the twins continue recording, and have branched out into film making and "Indie" record releases by working with undiscovered talent.

Rheji Burrell is a voting member of the Recording Academy (Grammy Awards) as well as a RIAA certified Multi-Platinum Songwriter and Producer.

== Productions ==
=== Discography ===
- Burrell, Burrell (10/Virgin Records 1988)
- Tech Trax Inc, Tech Trax Inc
- NY House'n Authority, Apartments EP
- Utopia Project, Files EP
- Jazz Documents, Secret Code
- Metro, Angel Of Mercy
- Roqui, I've Just Begun To Love You
- Rheji Burrell, Space And Time
- Rheji Burrell, S.R.O

=== Producer/writer ===
- JoJo, Blackground (2005) Platinum
- Total, Total (1996) Platinum
- Monifah, Moods & Moments (1996) Platinum
- Channel Live, Station Identification (1995)
- Phase Two, "Reachin'" (Rheji Burrell Mix)
- Omniscence, "Amazin'" (1996)
