= Sunshine Anderson =

American singer (born 1974)

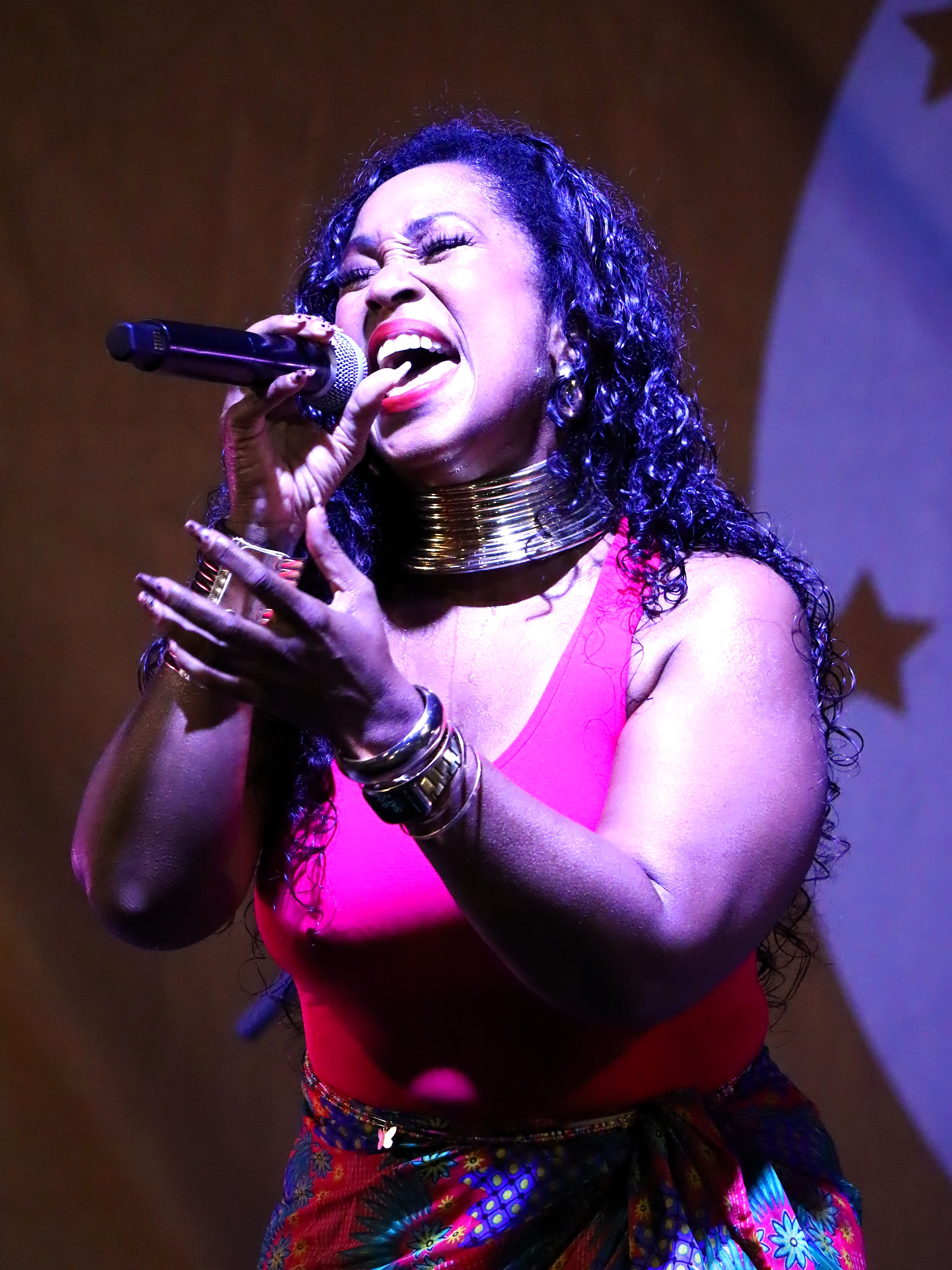
- Sunshine Anderson performing in 2025

Background information
- Born: Sunshine Jocelyn Sian Anderson; June 7, 1974 (age 51); Winston-Salem, North Carolina, U.S.
- Genres: R&B; soul; neo soul
- Occupations: Singer; songwriter
- Years active: 1999–present
- Labels: Soulife; Atlantic; Shining Star; Music World; Verve Forecast
- Website: iamsunshineanderson.com

Sunshine Jocelyn Sian Anderson (born June 7, 1974) is an American R&B and soul singer from Winston-Salem, North Carolina. She is best known for her 2001 single "Heard It All Before", which peaked within the top 20 of the Billboard Hot 100.

== Biography ==
=== Beginnings ===
Anderson was born in Winston-Salem, North Carolina, and later moved to Charlotte. Wallace Sellars, a friend of a producer/Soulife A&R Vice President, Mike City, heard Anderson singing on her way to the cafeteria of North Carolina Central University (where she earned a BS in criminal justice) and introduced the two. From there, Anderson was managed by Macy Gray during the recording of her first album.

=== 1999–2002: Your Woman ===
In 1999, Anderson signed with Atlantic Records. Anderson released her debut album, Your Woman in April 2001. The album debuted at No. 8 on Billboard's Hot 200 and No. 2 on Top R&B charts. The lead single, "Heard It All Before," (released February 27, 2001) peaked at No. 18 on the Billboard Hot 100 and at No. 3 on the R&B charts. The follow-up single "Lunch or Dinner," peaked at No. 54 on R&B charts. The album was certified gold later that year.

=== 2004–2007: Sunshine at Midnight ===
In August 2004, Anderson signed to Mathew Knowles' new record label Music World Entertainment. In 2006, her first single for her new label, "Something I Wanna Give You" was released and peaked at No. 80 on Billboard R&B charts. A video of the song was shot in Los Angeles by director Gil Green.

On January 23, 2007, Anderson released her second album, Sunshine at Midnight. The album debuted and peaked at No. 86 on the Billboard 200 and No. 16 on the R&B charts. In addition to the release of the album, Anderson toured with singer Brian McKnight. Later that year, the follow-up singles "Force of Nature" (#75 R&B) and "Wear The Crown" were released.

=== 2010–present: The Sun Shines Again ===
In September 2010, Anderson announced on her Twitter that her new single "Lie to Kick It" was released to radio. Her third studio album, The Sun Shines Again was released November 2, 2010, on Verve Forecast Records.

== Discography ==
=== Studio albums ===
Title	Album details	Peak positions			Certifications
Title	Album details	US	US R&B	UK	Certifications
Your Woman	Released: April 17, 2001; Label: Soulife, Atlantic; Formats: CD, digital download	5	2	39	RIAA: Gold
Sunshine at Midnight	Released: January 23, 2007; Label: Music World; Formats: CD, digital download	86	16	—	
The Sun Shines Again	Released: November 2, 2010; Label: Verve Music; Formats: CD, digital download	—	50	—	

=== Singles ===
Year	Title	Peak positions				Album
Year	Title	US	US R&B	US Dance	UK	Album
2001	"Heard It All Before"	18	3	11	9	Your Woman
2001	"Lunch or Dinner"	—	54	—	57	Your Woman
2006	"Something I Wanna Give You"	—	80	—	—	Sunshine at Midnight
2007	"Force of Nature"	—	75	—	—	Sunshine at Midnight
2007	"Wear the Crown"	—	—	—	—	Sunshine at Midnight
2010	"Lie to Kick It"	—	84	—	—	The Sun Shines Again
2011	"Say Something"	—	—	—	—	The Sun Shines Again
