= I Wish (Carl Thomas song) =

2000 song by Carl Thomas

Single by Carl Thomas

from the album Emotional
- Released: February 15, 2000
- Length: 3:48
- Label: Bad Boy; Arista
- Songwriters: Carl Thomas; Michael Flowers
- Producer: Mike City

Carl Thomas singles chronology
"Summer Rain" (2000)	"I Wish" (2000)	"Emotional" (2000)

Music video
- "I Wish" on YouTube

"I Wish" is a song by American R&B singer Carl Thomas, released by Arista and Bad Boy Records on February 15, 2000 as the second single from his debut album Emotional. It was co-written by Thomas and Mike City, while production was handled by the latter. The song peaked at number 20 on the US Billboard Hot 100 and spent six weeks atop the US Hot R&B/Hip-Hop Songs chart.

== Background ==
"I Wish" was written by Thomas along with the song's producer, Mike City. Thomas also served as a co-producer on the track. Lyrically, "I Wish" describes a narrator who finds himself in a "situationship." According to producer Mike City, the song was written based on a personal story of his. Several connections led City's demo of the song to be discovered by Sean "P. Diddy" Combs. After City rearranged the song for Carl Thomas, he claims to have been kicked out of Combs' recording studio.

== Music video ==
A music video for "I Wish" was directed by Marcus Raboy and filmed in New York City.

== Remixes ==
The official remix of "I Wish" features guest appearances from Bad Boy Records label boss P. Diddy and LL Cool J, while another remix that features Prodigy and Shyne. A "megamix" compiled by DJ Clue features all three performers.

== Credits and personnel ==
Credits lifted from the liner notes of Emotional.

- Prince Charles Alexander – engineering, mixing
- Ben Allen – recording, engineer
- Mike City – producer, writer
- Sean Combs – executive producer
- Dave Dar – assistant engineer
- Paul Logus – engineering, mixing
- Lou Michaels – assistant engineer
- Harve "Joe Hooker" Pierre – associate executive producer
- Carl Thomas – co-producer, vocalist, writer

== Charts ==
=== Weekly charts ===
Weekly chart performance for "I Wish"
Chart (2000)	Peak position
US Billboard Hot 100	20
US Hot R&B/Hip-Hop Songs (Billboard)	1

=== Year-end charts ===
Year-end chart performance for "I Wish"
Chart (2000)	Position
US Billboard Hot 100	64
US Hot R&B/Hip-Hop Songs (Billboard)	8
