= Channel Live =

American hip hop group

- Origin: East Orange, New Jersey, U.S.
- Genres: Hip Hop
- Years active: 1994–present
- Labels: Capitol; EMI; Flavor Unit
- Members: Tuffy; Hakim (born February 3, 1969)

Channel Live is an American hip hop duo composed of Vincent "Tuffy" Morgan and Hakim Green, which recorded for Capitol Records and Flavor Unit Records.

Discovered by KRS-One, the duo released its debut album, Station Identification, in 1995. It spawned the group's most successful single, "Mad Izm", which peaked at 54 on the Billboard Hot 100.

== Discography ==
=== Albums ===
Year	Title	Chart positions	
Year	Title	U.S.	U.S. R&B
1995	Station Identification: Released: March 21, 1995; Label: Capitol/EMI Records	58	9
2000	Armaghetto: Released: July 18, 2000; Label: Flavor Unit	–	–
2006	Secret Science Rap: Released: October 31, 2006; Label: Draft	–	–
