= Monifah =

American R&B singer

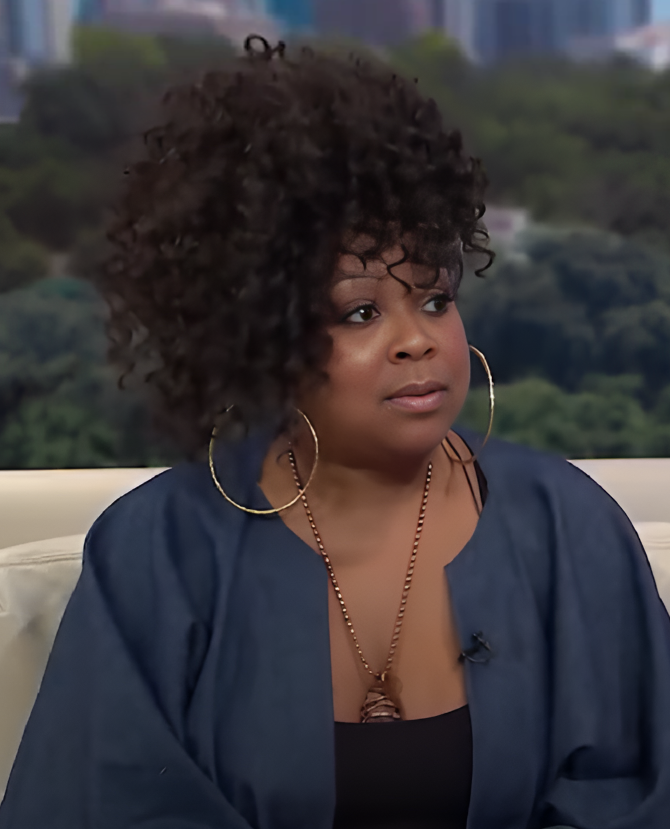
- Monifah in 2019

Background information
- Born: Monifa Carter; January 28, 1972 (age 54); New York City, U.S.
- Genres: R&B; hip hop
- Occupations: Singer; songwriter; television personality
- Years active: 1995–present
- Labels: Uptown; Universal
- Website: Official Facebook

Monifa Carter (born January 28, 1972), also known as Monifah, is an American R&B singer. She is best known for her association with the late rapper Heavy D and her music from the mid-1990s, including "I Miss You (Come Back Home)", "You" and "Touch It", which was released in 1998. She starred on TV One's reality show R&B Divas: Atlanta. She is also known for her single "You Don't Have to Love Me".

== Early life ==
Monifah was born and raised in New York City.

== Career ==
In 1996, her gold certified debut album, Moods...Moments was released. In 1997, she contributed the Heavy D.-produced "I Still Love You" to the soundtrack of the film, Sprung. Monifah's second album was Mo'hogany. Released in the last quarter of 1998, it featured "Touch It". The track peaked at No. 29 in the UK Singles Chart. Monifah's third album Home, released in 2000 contained "I Can Tell", "Brown Eyes" and "Fairytales". In 2003, she played a supporting role in Michael Baisden's Men Cry in the Dark stage play. In August 2012, Monifah and R&B singers Syleena Johnson, Faith Evans, Keke Wyatt, LaTocha Scott, Angie Stone, and Nicci Gilbert appeared in a reality show for TV One called R&B Divas. It was later retitled R&B Divas: Atlanta and Monifah has appeared on the subsequent second and third seasons, with LaTavia Roberson and Kameelah Williams joining the cast in season 3 on April 23, 2014. In 2012, she appeared on Faith Evans' compilation album R&B Divas on the single "Lovin' Me" in addition to her solo track "She's Me". The album was later nominated for a Grammy. She released a new single "The Other Side" which premiered in June 2014. In 2015, Monifah signed with and released a single "One Moment" with Famous Records / Famous Music Group based out of Sunrise, Florida who distributes via Universal.

== Personal life ==
On R&B Divas: Atlanta, Monifah publicly revealed she is in a same-sex relationship. In the third-season finale of R&B Divas: Atlanta, she married her longtime partner Terez on April 4, 2014. Monifah has a daughter born in 1991.

== Discography ==
=== Albums ===
Title	Album details	Peak chart positions		Certifications
Title	Album details	US	US R&B	Certifications
Moods...Moments	Released: March 26, 1996; Label: Uptown; Format: CD, cassette, digital download	42	4	
Mo'hogany	Released: August 25, 1998; Label: Uptown; Format: CD, cassette, digital download	96	2	RIAA: Gold
Home	Released: October 17, 2000; Label: Universal; Format: CD, cassette, digital download	151	39	

=== Singles ===
Single	Year	Peak chart positions							Certifications	Album
Single	Year	US	US R&B	AUS	BEL (Fl)	NLD	NZ	UK	Certifications	Album
"I Miss You (Come Back Home)"	1996	56	16	—	—	—	—	—		Moods...Moments
"You"	1996	32	11	—	—	—	—	—	RIAA: Gold	Moods...Moments
"You Don't Have to Love Me"	1996	82	36	—	—	—	38	—		Moods...Moments
"I Still Love You"	1997	—	55	—	—	—	—	—		Sprung
"Touch It"	1998	9	9	5	7	27	27	29	ARIA: Platinum; BEA: Gold	Mo'hogany
"Suga Suga"	1998	—	71	17	—	—	44	—		Mo'hogany
"Bad Girl"	1999	—	—	17	—	—	44	—		Mo'hogany
"I Can Tell"	2000	—	94	90	—	—	—	—		Home
"The Other Side"	2014	—	—	—	—	—	—	—		—N/a
"One Moment"	2015	—	—	—	—	—	—	—		—N/a
