= Carl Thomas (singer) =

American R&B singer (born 1970)

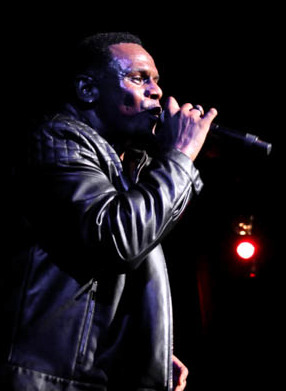
- Thomas performing in 2014

Background information
- Born: Carlton Neron Thomas; June 15, 1972 (age 54); Aurora, Illinois, U.S.
- Genres: R&B; soul
- Occupation: Singer
- Years active: 1997–present
- Labels: Bad Boy (1997–2005); Bungalo (2006–10); Verve Forecast (2011–14)

Carlton Neron Thomas (born June 15, 1972) is an American R&B singer from Aurora, Illinois. He was discovered by American rapper Puff Daddy, who signed Thomas to Bad Boy Records, a then-imprint of Arista Records in 1997. He became best known for his 2000 single "I Wish", which peaked at number 20 on the Billboard Hot 100 and preceded his debut studio album, Emotional (2000).

The album and its follow-up, Let's Talk About It (2004), both peaked within the top ten of the Billboard 200, although the latter failed to spawn any charting singles on the Billboard Hot 100 and served as his final release with Bad Boy. He then signed with Bungalo and Universal Records to release his third album, So Much Better (2007), which moderately entered the Billboard 200, while his fourth, Conquer (2011)—released by Verve Forecast—narrowly did so.

== Early life ==
Thomas was born in Aurora, Illinois and attended East Aurora High School.

== Career ==
Thomas began his career singing around Chicago and became a member of a group called The Fourmula. He later branched out, however, and traveled to New York City, where he sang at clubs during open-mic nights. One such performance caught the eye of Sean "Puffy" Combs, who signed Thomas to Bad Boy Entertainment in 1997. In February 2000, Thomas released his hit single "I Wish" (produced by Mike City). With the song topping the R&B charts for six consecutive weeks and creating strong interest, his debut album, Emotional, was released on April 18, 2000. On the strength of this single, and other singles such as "Summer Rain" which peaked at No. 18 and appeared on the soundtrack to the 2000 film version of Shaft, and the title track "Emotional" which reached No. 8 on the R&B charts, the album was certified platinum with over 1 million in sales. Later, rapper Jay-Z interpolated Thomas's "I Wish" on "I Just Wanna Love U (Give It 2 Me)" from his 2000 album The Dynasty: Roc La Familia. Thomas also sung on the track "Everyday" from The Understanding by rapper Memphis Bleek, and collaborated with rappers Cuban Link and Big Pun for the song "Cheat On Her" from Cuban's unreleased debut LP 24K, which was later leaked onto the internet.

Thomas's second album, Let's Talk About It, was released on March 23, 2004. The album's two singles, "She Is" and "Let's Talk About It", charted poorly. Lack of promotion (caused by the death of Thomas's brother Duranthony Evans, who was killed in a drive-by on Halloween night on Aurora's east side) was a contributing factor. This devastated Thomas, causing him to take a sabbatical from his music and the promotion of the album. The album was highly anticipated due to the length of time that had passed since Emotional, but was not well received by fans. In 2005, Thomas was featured on R&B singer Amerie's second album Touch, on the ninth track, titled "Can We Go". On the 2006 2Pac album Pac's Life, he was featured alongside Hussein Fatal and Papoose on the track "Dumpin'".

On December 7, 2006, Thomas earned a Grammy Award nomination, along with Chaka Khan, Yolanda Adams, and the late Gerald Levert, for "Everyday (Family Reunion)", a song from the soundtrack of Tyler Perry's Madea's Family Reunion. The song received a nomination for Best R&B Performance by a Duo Or Group With Vocals. Thomas's third album, So Much Better, was released on May 30, 2007, and reached number 25 on the US Billboard 200 chart.

Thomas's last recording contract was with Verve Music Group. His last album titled Conquer was released on December 6, 2011. The first single, "Don't Kiss Me", which featured Snoop Dogg, was written and produced by Rico Love.

== Personal life ==
In October 2004, following the release of Thomas's album Let's Talk About It, his brother Duranthony Evans, who worked as a corrections officer at the Illinois Youth Center in St. Charles, was killed in a drive-by shooting. The singer cancelled his tour to deal with his brother's death and his record label established the Duranthony Evans Foundation in his brother's memory. In 2019, Thomas underwent a surgical procedure to remove a noncancerous tumor in his salivary glands.

== Discography ==
=== Studio albums ===
- Emotional (2000)
- Let's Talk About It (2004)
- So Much Better (2007)
- Conquer (2011)

== Awards ==
Year	Award	Category	Nominee(s)	Result	Ref.
2001	NAACP Image Awards	Outstanding New Artist	Carl Thomas	Won	
2001	Soul Train Music Awards	Best R&B/Soul Album – Male	Emotional	Nominated	
2001	Soul Train Music Awards	Best R&B/Soul Single – Male	"I Wish"	Nominated	
2001	Soul Train Music Awards	Best R&B/Soul or Rap New Artist	Carl Thomas	Nominated	
2002	Grammy Awards	Best R&B Performance by a Duo or Group with Vocals	"Can't Believe"	Nominated	
2007	Grammy Awards	Best R&B Performance by a Duo or Group with Vocals	"Everyday (Family Reunion)"	Nominated	
