= Mike City =

American singer-songwriter

- Also known as: Mikey Dan (as background vocalist)
- Born: Michael Flowers; December 2, 1970 (age 55); Philadelphia, Pennsylvania, U.S.
- Origin: Charlotte, North Carolina, U.S.
- Genres: House; deep house; R&B; hip hop
- Occupations: Singer; songwriter; record producer
- Instruments: Keyboards; synthesizers; drum machine; wurlitzer; drums; bass
- Years active: 1995–present
- Labels: Ichiban; Intersound; Soulife; BBE

Michael Flowers, known professionally as Mike City (born December 2, 1970), is an American singer, songwriter and record producer. He is best known for producing the singles "I Wish" for Carl Thomas, "Heard It All Before" for Sunshine Anderson, "Full Moon" for Brandy and "One Woman Man" for Dave Hollister. He is also known for producing "She's All I Got" performed by Jimmy Cozier.

== Career ==
He became a mentor of Anderson's after a friend discovered her singing a song by Lalah Hathaway in the cafeteria line at North Carolina Central University.

He earned the moniker "Mike City" because he was an avid listener of the house music group Ten City. Initially a songwriter, City became a singer by trade and later a producer after needing an outlet to use the songs he wrote. He started out playing drums and bass, but switched to keyboards after graduating from high school in 1987.

Flowers is also the founder and CEO of Unsung Entertainment, Inc. He is also a member of Iota Phi Theta fraternity, a predominantly African-American national fraternity. He was initiated at Alpha Epsilon Chapter at North Carolina Central University in Spring 1988.

He is noted for production on Brandy's albums Full Moon (2002), Afrodisiac (2004), Sweet Nothings (intended for release in 2007) and Two Eleven (2012).

In 2015, he began a new music project called Lewis City alongside British house and garage producer Danny J Lewis. In 2017, he released his house music inspired second album The Feel Good Agenda, Vol. 1. In recent years, he has made a transition into working in the Southern soul subgenre, writing and producing for his protege A.G. Thomas.

== Discography ==
=== Studio albums ===
- City Limits (Platinum Entertainment/Intersound, 1998)
- The Feel Good Agenda, Vol. 1 (Unsung Entertainment/BBE, 2017)

=== Production credits ===
- Channel Live – Armaghetto (2000)
- Carl Thomas – Emotional (2000)
- Dave Hollister – Chicago '85... The Movie (2000)

02. "Keep On Lovin'"
04. "One Woman Man"

- Usher – 8701 (2001)
- Yolanda Adams – Believe (2001)
- Babyface – Face 2 Face (2001)

01. "Outside In/Inside Out"

- Bilal Oliver – 1st Born Second (2001)
- Brandy – Osmosis Jones (soundtrack) (2001)

04. Open

- Gerald Levert – Gerald's World (2001)
- Jimmy Cozier – Jimmy Cozier (2001)
- Nate Dogg – Music & Me (2001)
- Ras Kass – Van Gogh (2001)
- Rell – If That's My Baby (single) (2001)
- Ruff Ryders – Ryde or Die Vol. 3: In the "R" We Trust (2001)
- Sunshine Anderson – Your Woman (2001)
- Brandy – Full Moon (2002)

02. Full Moon

- Mary Mary – Incredible (2002)
- Nappy Roots – Watermelon, Chicken & Gritz (2002)
- Ras Kass – Goldyn Chyld (2002)
- Dave Hollister – Things in the Game Done Changed (2002)
- Kelly Price – Priceless (2003)

03. You Make Me Feel
13. I Live Here Now

- LSG – LSG2 (2003)

06. Playing with Fire

- Blu Cantrell – Bittersweet (2003)

12. No Place Like Home

- Calvin Richardson – 2:35 P.M. (2003)

12. Cross My Heart

- Nappy Roots – Wooden Leather (2003)
- 702 – Star (2003)
- Carl Thomas – Let's Talk About It (2004)

06. Make It Alright

- Rahsaan Patterson – After Hours

12. Forever Yours (2004)

- JoJo – JoJo (2004)

04. The Happy Song

- Jon B. – Stronger Everyday (2004)

05. Hands On U

- Gerald Levert – Do I Speak for the World (2004)

14. Where Do We Go

- Lalah Hathaway- Outrun the Sky (2004)

01. How Many Times
03. Your Favorite Song
05. Better And Better

- Brandy – Afrodisiac (Special Edition) (2004)

16. Like It Was Yesterday

- Anthony Hamilton – Soulife (2005)

09. Last Night

- Yolanda Adams – Day by Day (2005)

11. I'm Grateful

- Dwele – Some Kinda... (2005)

09. I Think I Love U

- Jamie Foxx – Unpredictable (2005)

07. Extravaganza
09. Get This Money

- Shanice – Every Woman Dreams (2006)

08. That's Why I Love You

- Urban Mystic – Ghetto Revelations II (2006)

10. When U Hurt

- Rihanna – A Girl Like Me (2006)

05. Dem Haters

- Donell Jones – Journey of a Gemini (2006)

05. Spend the Night
09. Lust or Love

- Chris Brown – "You" (2006)
- Defari – Street Music (2006)
- 3LW – Point of No Return (2006)

00. Strictly Business
00. Keep It Sexy
00. Fall Back

- Dave Hollister – The Book of David: Vol. 1 – The Transition (2006)
- Sunshine Anderson – Sunshine at Midnight (2006)
- Carl Thomas – So Much Better (2007)
- Keith Murray – Rap-Murr-Phobia (2007)

04. Don't Fuck wit 'Em

- Brandy – Sweet Nothings (2007)

00. Deepest Thoughts
00. It Never Happened (duet with Mike City)
00. The Joneses
00. Throw It All Away

- Heavy D. – Vibes (2008)

06. Hugs and Kisses

- KeAnthony – A Hustlaz Story (2008)

12. It's Okay

- Musiq Soulchild – "Say It Ain't So" (2008)
- Urban Mystic – GRIII: Old Skool 2 Nu Skool (2009)

12. It Wasn't Me

- Mack 10 – Soft White (2009)

07. "Street Shit" (featuring Glasses Malone)

- Dwele – W.ants W.orld W.omen (2010)
- Donell Jones – Lyrics (2010)

10. The Finer Things in Life

- Faith Evans – Something About Faith (2010)
- Sunshine Anderson – The Sun Shines Again (2010)
- El DeBarge – Second Chance (2010)

01. Lay With You (featuring Faith Evans)
03. Close to You
07. Serenading

- Avant – The Letter (2010)

06. Nightlife

- Ledisi – Pieces of Me (2011)

07. Shut Up

- Lalah Hathaway – Where It All Begins (2011)

06. Always Love You
13. My Heart (iTunes bonus track)

- Anthony Hamilton – Back to Love (2011)

02. Writing on the Wall

- Carl Thomas- Conquer (2011)

05. It's Not The Same
09. Sweet Love

- Mark Morrison – I Am What I Am (2011)

TBR. B'Day ft. Trina
TBR. B'Day (Remix) ft.Warren G

- Dwele – Greater Than One (2012)

05. "What Profit"
11. "Special"

- Mashonda – Love, Mashonda (2012)

04. Touch Me

- Faith Evans featuring Nicci Gilbert & Helene "Mom" Gilbert – R&B Divas (2012)

07. Sometimes

- Brandy – Two Eleven (Deluxe Edition) (2012)

15. Music

- Angie Stone – Rich Girl (2012)

03. Backup Plan
11. Right in Front of Me

- Maysa – Blue Velvet Soul (2013)

13. This Much

- Leela James – Fall for You (2014)

03. Give It

- Faith Evans – Incomparable (2014)

02. Extraordinary
14. Paradise

- Ameriie – Drive (2016)

04. Trouble with Love

- Chico Benymon - "Good Time" (single) (2017)
- Chico Benymon - Don't Talk, Just Listen (2019)

05. My Love Is Real

- A.G. Thomas - "One Man's Trash" (single) (2022)
