= Sean Combs production discography =

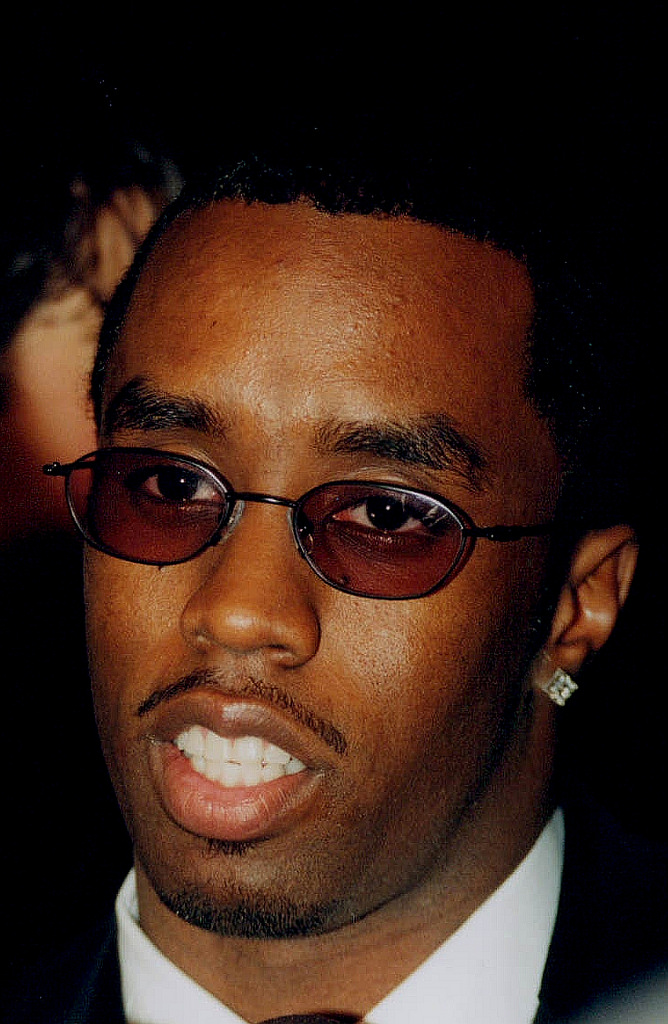
Combs at the 2000 Rock and Roll Hall of Fame

The following list is a discography of production and co-production by American rapper and producer Sean Combs, known professionally as Diddy (formerly Puff Daddy and P. Diddy). (Note: Combs adopted the stage name "Puff Daddy" in 1996 for his first release and would later change his name to "P. Diddy" in 2001 and to "Diddy" in 2005. This article uses "Combs" for consistency.) includes a list of songs produced, co-produced and remixed by year, artist, album and title. Alongside this, Combs was a lead member of Bad Boy Records' in-house production team, the Hitmen.

Following his arrest on charges of sex trafficking and racketeering in September 2024, music industry insiders predicted that it would cast a negative light on Combs's musical legacy. According to an article in Time.com, however, a total ban of his music would be unlikely due to his pervasive influence on other artists such as the Notorious B.I.G.

== 1990 ==
=== Father MC – Father's Day ===
- Executive Producer with Andre Harrell

== 1991 ==
=== Jodeci – Forever My Lady ===
- "Come and Talk to Me (Remix)"

== 1992 ==
=== Mary J. Blige – What's the 411? ===
- 01. "Leave a Message"
- 02. "Reminisce"
- 05. "Intro Talk" (feat. Busta Rhymes)
- 11. "Changes I've Been Going Through"
- 12. "What's the 411?" (feat. Grand Puba)

== 1993 ==
=== Mary J. Blige – What's the 411? Remix ===
- 02. "You Don't Have to Worry" (feat. Craig Mack)
- 04. "Real Love" (feat. Ron G)
- 05. "What's the 411?" (feat. The Notorious B.I.G., K-Ci)
- 06. "Reminisce"
- 09. "Love No Limit" (feat. Kid Capri)
- 10. "You Remind Me"

== 1994 ==
=== The Notorious B.I.G. – Ready to Die ===
- 01. "Intro"
- 07. "One More Chance"
- 08. "#!*@ Me (Interlude)"
- 10. "Juicy"
- 12. "Me & My Bitch"
- 13. "Big Poppa"
- 14. "Respect"
- 18. "Who Shot Ya?"

=== TLC – CrazySexyCool ===
- 06. "CrazySexyCool (Interlude)"
- 11. "If I Was Your Girlfriend" [written by Prince]
- 12. "Sexy (Interlude)"
- 14. "Can I Get a Witness (Interlude)" (feat. Busta Rhymes)

=== Mary J. Blige – My Life ===
- 01. "Intro"
- 02. "Mary Jane (All Night Long)"
- 03. "You Bring Me Joy"
- 04. "Marvin (Interlude)"
- 05. "I'm the Only Woman"
- 07. "My Life"
- 10. "I'm Goin' Down"
- 11. "My Life (Interlude)"
- 12. "Be with You"
- 13. "Mary's Joint"
- 14. "Don't Go"
- 15. "I Love You"
- 17. "Be Happy"

== 1995 ==
=== The Show: The Soundtrack ===
- 10. Mary J. Blige, Faith Evans – "Everyday It Rains"
- 25. The Notorious B.I.G. – "Me and My Bitch (Live From Philly)"

=== New Jersey Drive, Vol. 1 ===
- 06. Total - "Can't You See?"

=== Pebbles - Straight from My Heart ===
- 05. "You"

=== Faith Evans – Faith ===
- 02. "No Other Love"
- 03. "Fallin' in Love"
- 04. "Ain't Nobody"
- 06. "Love Don't Live Here Anymore" (feat. Mary J. Blige)
- 07. "Come Over"
- 08. "Soon As I Get Home"
- 09. "All This Love"
- 11. "You Used to Love Me"
- 12. "Give It to Me"
- 13. "You Don't Understand"
- 15. "Reasons"

=== Shabba Ranks - A Mi Shabba ===
- 06. "Rough Life"

== 1996 ==
=== Horace Brown - Horace Brown ===
- 02. "How Can We Stop" (feat. Faith Evans)
- 04. "I Want You Baby"

=== High School High (soundtrack) ===
- 05. Faith Evans - "I Just Can't" (co-produced with Stevie J.)

=== Total – Total ===
- 02. "Do You Know"
- 04. "Whose Is It? (Interlude)"
- 07. "Definition of a Bad Girl (Interlude)"
- 08. "Can't You See" (feat. The Notorious B.I.G.)
- 09. "Someone Like You"
- 11. "Love Is All We Need"
- 12. "Don't Ever Change"
- 13. "Spend Some Time"
- 14. "When Boy Meets Girl"
- 15. "No One Else (Puff Daddy Remix)" (feat. Lil' Kim, Foxy Brown, Da Brat)

=== New Edition – Home Again ===
- 03. "You Don't Have to Worry"
- 07. "Try Again"

=== Lil' Kim - Hard Core ===
- 03. "No Time" (feat. Puff Daddy)

== 1997 ==
=== Boyz II Men – Evolution ===
- 07. "Can't Let Her Go" (co-produced with Stevie J.)
- 09. "Come On"
- 12. "To the Limit"

=== The Notorious B.I.G. – Life After Death ===
CD1

- 01. "Life After Death (Intro)"
- 02. "Somebody's Gotta Die"
- 03. "Hypnotize"
- 05. "Fuck You Tonight" (feat. R. Kelly)
- 10. "Mo Money Mo Problems" (feat. Puff Daddy & Ma$e)

CD2

- 01. "Notorious Thugs" (feat. Bone Thugs-n-Harmony)
- 03. "Another" (feat. Lil' Kim)
- 06. "Playa Hater"
- 07. "Nasty Boy"
- 09. "The World Is Filled..." (feat. Puff Daddy & Too Short)
- 10. "My Downfall" (feat. DMC)
- 12. "You're Nobody (Til Somebody Kills You)"

=== KRS-One – I Got Next ===
- 19. "Step into a World (Rapture's Delight) (Remix)" (feat. Puff Daddy, Keva)

=== Tevin Campbell - Back to the World ===
- 03. "You Don't Have to Worry"
- 08. "I'll Be There"
- 09. "We Can Work It Out"

=== Puff Daddy and the Family – No Way Out ===
- 02. "Victory" (feat. The Notorious B.I.G., Busta Rhymes)
- 03. "Been Around the World" (feat. The Notorious B.I.G., Mase)
- 04. "What You Gonna Do?"
- 05. "Don't Stop What You're Doing" (feat. Lil' Kim)
- 06. "If I Should Die Tonight (Interlude)" (feat. Carl Thomas)
- 07. "Do You Know?" (feat. Kelly Price)
- 09. "I Love You Baby" (feat. Black Rob)
- 10. "It's All About the Benjamins" (feat. The Notorious B.I.G., The LOX, Lil' Kim)
- 11. "Pain" (feat. Carl Thomas)
- 12. "Is This the End?" (feat. Carl Thomas, Ginuwine, Twista)
- 13. "I Got the Power" (feat. The LOX)
- 14. "Friend" (feat. Foxy Brown, Simone Hines)
- 15. "Señorita"
- 16. "I'll Be Missing You" (feat. Faith Evans, 112)
- 17. "Can't Nobody Hold Me Down" (feat. Mase)

=== SWV - Release Some Tension ===
- 01. "Someone" (feat. Puff Daddy)

=== Money Talks (soundtrack) ===
- 03. Puff Daddy, Black Rob & Kelly Price - "No Way Out"
- 11. Ma$e & Kelly Price - "Feel So Good"

=== Mariah Carey – Butterfly ===
- 01. "Honey"
- 06. "Breakdown" (feat. Bone Thugs-n-Harmony)

=== Busta Rhymes – When Disaster Strikes ===
- 17. "The Body Rock" (feat. Rampage, Puff Daddy, Mase)

=== Brian McKnight – Anytime ===
- 03. "You Should Be Mine (Don't Waste Your Time)" (feat. Mase & Kelly Price)

=== Soul for Real - For Life ===
- 04. "Love You So"
- 09. "Where Do We Go?"

=== Soul Food (soundtrack) ===
- 05. Puff Daddy & Lil Kim - "Don't Stop What You're Doing"

=== LL Cool J – Phenomenon ===
- 01. "Phenomenon"
- 06. "Hot Hot Hot"

=== Mase – Harlem World ===
- 01. "The Life in New York (Intro)"
- 05. "Will They Die 4 U?" (feat. Puff Daddy, Lil' Kim)
- 12. "Feel So Good" (feat. Kelly Price)
- 13. "What You Want" (feat. Total)
- 19. "Wanna Hurt Mase?"
- 20. "Jealous Guy" (feat. 112)

=== Jay-Z – In My Lifetime, Vol. 1 ===
- 03. "I Know What Girls Like" (feat. Lil' Kim, Puff Daddy)

=== Mic Geronimo - Vendetta ===
- 01. "Nothin' Move but the Money" (feat. Puff Daddy & Kelly Price)

=== LSG - Levert.Sweat.Gill ===
- 03. "You Got Me" (feat. The Lox)

=== In tha Beginning...There Was Rap ===
- 04. Puff Daddy - "Big Ole Butt"

== 1998 ==
=== The LOX – Money, Power & Respect ===
- 02. "Livin' the Life"
- 06. "Get This $" (feat. Puff Daddy)
- 11. "The Heist, Pt. 1"
- 12. "Not to Be Fucked With"
- 15. "Can't Stop, Won't Stop" (feat. Puff Daddy)
- 17. "So Right" (feat. Kelly Price)

=== Aretha Franklin – A Rose Is Still a Rose ===
- 02. "Never Leave You Again"

=== R. Kelly – R. ===
CD1

- 02. "Spendin' Money" (feat. Kelly Price)

=== Godzilla: The Album ===
- 02. Puff Daddy – "Come with Me" (feat. Jimmy Page)

=== Belly (soundtrack) ===
- 05. Jerome Childers - "Never Dreamed You'd Leave in Summer"

=== Motown 40 Forever ===
- 19. Jackson 5 – "I Want You Back '98" (feat. Black Rob & Puff Daddy)

=== Total – Kima, Keisha, and Pam ===
- 03. "Rock Track"
- 06. "Press Rewind" (feat. Carl Thomas)
- 09. "What About Us (Bad Boy Remix)" (feat. Black Rob)
- 12. "Rain"

== 1999 ==
=== Jennifer Lopez – On the 6 ===
- 04. "Feelin' So Good" (feat. Big Pun, Fat Joe)

=== Puff Daddy – Forever ===
- 01. "Forever (Intro)"
- 03. "I'll Do This for You" (feat. Kelly Price)
- 04. "Do You Like It... Do You Want It..." (feat. Jay-Z)
- 05. "Satisfy You" (feat. R. Kelly)
- 06. "Is This the End (Part Two)" (feat. Twista, Cheri Dennis)
- 07. "I Hear Voices" (feat. Carl Thomas)
- 08. "Fake Thugs Dedication" (feat. Redman)
- 09. "Diddy Speaks! (Interlude)"
- 10. "Angels with Dirty Faces" (feat. Bizzy Bone)
- 11. "Gangsta Shit" (feat. Lil' Kim, Mark Curry)
- 13. "Pain" (feat. G. Dep)
- 16. "Journey Through the Life" (feat. Lil' Kim, Joe Hooker, Beanie Sigel, Nas)
- 17. "Best Friend" (feat. Mario Winans, Hezekiah Walker)
- 19. "P.E. 2000" (feat. Hurricane G)

=== The Notorious B.I.G. – Born Again ===
- 02. "Notorious B.I.G." (feat. Lil' Kim, Puff Daddy)
- 03. "Dead Wrong" (feat. Eminem)
- 07. "Niggas"
- 09. "Would You Die for Me?" (feat. Lil' Kim, Puff Daddy)
- 13. "Tonight" (feat. Mobb Deep, Joe Hooker)
- 17. "I Really Want to Show You" (feat. K-Ci & JoJo, Nas)

== 2000 ==
=== Heavy D – Heavy Hitz ===
- 9. "You Can't See What I Can See" (co-produced with Dr. Cuess)

=== Black Rob – Life Story ===
- 07. "You Don't Know Me" (feat. Lil Kim & G Dep)
- 08. "Espacio"
- 15. "Thug Story"

=== Sauce Money - Middle Finger U ===
- 06. "Do You See?" (feat. Puff Daddy)

=== Ice Cube – War & Peace Vol. 2 (The Peace Disc) ===
- 11. "Gotta Be Insanity"

=== Carl Thomas – Emotional ===
- 08. "Woke Up in the Morning"

=== Shyne – Shyne ===
- 13. "That's Gangsta"

== 2001 ==
=== Dream – It Was All a Dream ===
- 03. "In My Dreams"
- 09. "What We Gonna Do About Us"
- 11. "Mr. Telephone Man"
- 12. "Angel Inside"
- 17. "He Loves U Not (Remix)"

=== Jennifer Lopez – J.Lo ===
- 04. "Walking on Sunshine"
- 07. "Come Over"
- 09. "That's Not Me"
- 10. "Dance with Me"

=== Benzino - The Benzino Project ===
- 01. "Who Is Benzino?" (feat. Puff Daddy)

=== P. Diddy and the Bad Boy Family – The Saga Continues... ===
- 01. "The Saga Continues" (feat. G. Dep, Loon, Black Rob)
- 06. "Shiny Suit Man (Interlude)"
- 09. "Airport (Interlude)"
- 12. "Where's Sean?" (feat. Loon, Mark Curry, Black Rob, Kain, Big Azz Ko, Bristal)
- 16. "Smoke (Interlude)"
- 17. "Lonely" (feat. Mark Curry, Kain, Kokane)
- 19. "Nothing's Gonna Stop Me Now (Interlude)" (feat. Faith Evans, Mario Winans)
- 23. "Can't Believe" (feat. Faith Evans, Carl Thomas)

=== Training Day: The Soundtrack ===
- 10. P. Diddy, Mark Curry, Black Rob, David Bowie – "American Dream"

=== G. Dep – Child of the Ghetto ===
- 07. "Smash on the First Night" (feat. May)
- 14. "Doe Fiend"

=== Limp Bizkit – New Old Songs ===
- 04. "My Way (The P. Diddy Remix)"

== 2002 ==
=== Jennifer Lopez – J to tha L-O!: The Remixes ===
- 07. "Feelin' So Good (Bad Boy Remix)" (feat. P. Diddy, G. Dep)

=== P. Diddy and the Bad Boy Family – We Invented the Remix ===
- 01. "Intro"
- 03. "I Need a Girl (Part Two)" (feat. Ginuwine, Mario Winans, Loon)
- 05. "I Need a Girl (Part One)" (feat. Usher, Loon)
- 06. "The Remix Phenomenon (Interlude)"
- 09. "No More Drama (Remix)" (feat. Mary J. Blige)
- 12. "That's Crazy (Remix)" (feat. Black Rob, Missy Elliott, Snoop Dogg, G. Dep)
- 13. "Woke Up in the Morning (Remix)" (feat. Carl Thomas, The Notorious B.I.G.)
- 14. "You Gets No Love (Remix)" (feat. G. Dep, Faith Evans)

=== 3LW – A Girl Can Mack ===
- 01. "I Do (Wanna Get Close to You)" (feat. Loon)

== 2003 ==
=== Mr. Cheeks - Back Again! ===
- 10. "Pimpalicious"

=== Mario Winans – Hurt No More ===
- 04. "You Knew" (feat. Slim)

=== Bad Boys II OST ===
- 02. P. Diddy, Lenny Kravitz, Pharrell, Loon – "Show Me Your Soul"
- 06. Beyoncé – "Keep Giving Your Love to Me"
- 09. Snoop Dogg, Loon – "Gangsta Shit"
- 12. Justin Timberlake – "Love Don't Love Me"
- 14. Mary J. Blige – "Didn't Mean"

=== Mary J. Blige – Love & Life ===
- 01. "Love & Life Intro" (feat. Jay-Z, P. Diddy)
- 02. "Don't Go"
- 03. "When We"
- 05. "Finally Made It (Interlude)"
- 06. "Ooh!"
- 07. "Let Me Be the 1"
- 08. "Love @ 1st Sight" (feat. Method Man)
- 09. "Willing & Waiting"
- 10. "Free (Interlude)"
- 11. "Friends"
- 12. "Press On"
- 13. "Feel Like Makin' Love"
- 14. "It's a Wrap"
- 15. "Message in Our Music (Interlude)"
- 16. "All My Love"
- 17. "Special Part of Me"
- 18. "Ultimate Relationship (A.M.)"

=== The Fighting Temptations (soundtrack) ===
- 18. Beyonce - "Summertime"

=== Britney Spears – In the Zone ===
- 14. "The Answer"

== 2004 ==
=== Method Man – Tical 0: The Prequel ===
- 03. "Say What" (feat. Missy Elliott)

== 2006 ==
=== Ice Cube – Laugh Now, Cry Later ===
- 08. "Laugh Now, Cry Later"

=== Diddy – Press Play ===
- 01. "Testimonial (Intro)"
- 03. "I Am (Interlude)" (feat. Aasim)
- 06. "Come to Me" (feat. Nicole Scherzinger)
- 12. "Special Feeling" (feat. Mika Lett)

== 2007 ==
=== 8Ball & MJG – Ridin High ===
- 12. "Alcohol Pussy Weed"

=== Jay-Z – American Gangster ===
- 02. "Pray"
- 03. "American Dreamin'"
- 05. "No Hook"
- 06. "Roc Boys (And the Winner Is)..."
- 07. "Sweet"
- 09. "Party Life"

== 2008 ==
=== Cheri Dennis – In and Out of Love ===
- 17. "Freak" (Japan bonus track)

=== Day26 – Day26 ===
- 02. "Got Me Going"
- 06. "Co Star"

=== Donnie Klang – Just a Rolling Stone ===
- 02. "Take You There" (feat. Diddy)

== 2011 ==
=== Diddy – Dirty Money – Last Train to Paris ===
- 10. "Angels" (feat. The Notorious B.I.G., Rick Ross) (produced with Mario Winans)

== 2013 ==
=== Pitbull – Meltdown ===
- 05. "All the Things" (feat. Inna) (produced with Calvin Harris and Burns)

== 2014 ==
=== Rick Ross – Mastermind ===
- 05. "Nobody" (feat. French Montana) (produced with DJ Enuff and Jiv Pos)
- 10. "Supreme" (produced with Scott Storch)

== 2015 ==
=== Kanye West ===
- 00. "All Day"

=== Puff Daddy – MMM (Money Making Mitch) ===
- 01. "Facts"
- 02. "Harlem" (feat. Gizzle)
- 03. "Help Me" (feat. Sevyn Streeter)
- 04. "Everyday (Amor)" (feat. Jadakiss, Styles P, Pusha T, Tish Hyman)
- 05. "Auction" (feat. Lil' Kim, King Los, Styles P)
- 11. "Old Man Wildin'" (feat. Jadakiss, Styles P)

=== Pusha T – King Push – Darkest Before Dawn: The Prelude ===
- 01. "Intro"
- 04. "Crutches, Crosses, Caskets"
- 07. "Keep Dealing" (feat. Beanie Sigel)

Also executive producer

== 2017 ==
=== Faith Evans & The Notorious B.I.G. – The King & I ===
- 17. "Got Me Fuccd Up"

== 2020 ==
=== Burna Boy — Twice as Tall ===
- 02. "Alarm Clock" (produced with P2J)
- 03. "Way Too Big" (produced with Timbaland, Mike Dean, and LeriQ)
- 07. "Naughty By Nature" (produced with Mario Winans and Telz)

Also executive producer

=== C. J. Wallace ===
- "Big Poppa (House Mix)" (produced with Jonathan Hay)

== 2021 ==
=== French Montana — They Got Amnesia ===
- 01. "ICU" (produced with French Montana)

Also executive producer

== Bad Boy 90s Remixes ==
Title	Year	Artist
One Night Stand (Remix)	1992	Father MC
Come and Talk to Me (Remix)	1992	Jodeci
I'm Still Waiting (Daddy Jeep Remix)	1992	Jodeci
I'm Still Waiting (Daddy Hip Hop Remix)	1992	Jodeci
Real Love (Hip Hop Mix)	1992	Mary J. Blige, Notorious B.I.G
Dolly My Baby (Remix)	1993	Supercat, Notorious B.I.G., 3rd Eye, Puff Daddy
Reminisce (Remix)	1993	Mary J. Blige, C.L. Smooth
What's the 411? (Remix)	1993	Mary J. Blige, K-Ci, Notorious B.I.G.
Love No Limit (Bad Boy Remix)	1993	Mary J. Blige
You Remind Me (Daddy Hip Hop Mix)	1993	Mary J. Blige, Greg Nice
Every Day of the Week (Puffy & Chucky's Special Remix)	1994	Jade
How Many Ways (Toni Braxtons Remix)	1994	Toni Braxton, Puff Daddy, Notorious B.I.G.
Think of You (Bad Boy Remix)	1994	Usher, Faith Evans
Happiness (Bad Boy Remix)	1994	Billy Lawrence
Flava in Ya Ear (Remix)	1994	Craig Mack, LL Cool J, Rampage, Busta Rhymes, Notorious B.I.G.
Be Happy (Bad Boy Butta Mix)	1994	Mary J Blige, Keith Murray
Mary's Joint (Puffy Remix)	1994	Mary J. Blige
All Men Are Dogs (Puffy's Bad Boy Mix)	1995	Red Bandit, Keisha Black
Can't You See (Bad Boy Mix)	1995	Total, Keith Murray
I've Got a Little Something for You (Remix)	1995	MN8
This Is How We Do It (Puff Daddy Radio Remix)	1995	Montell Jordan
No Airplay (Bad Boy Remix)	1995	LL Cool J
Every Little Thing I Do (Remix)	1995	Soul for Real
You Used to Love Me (Bad Boy Remix)	1995	Faith Evans
Fantasy (Bad Boy Fantasy Mix)	1995	Mariah Carey, ODB
I'll Be There for You/ You're All I Need to Get By (Puff Daddy's Mix)	1995	Method Man, Mary J. Blige
Ain't Nobody (Who Could Love Me) (Puff and Chucky Remix)	1995	Faith Evans, Queen Latifah
One More Chance/Stay With Me (Remix)	1995	Notorious B.I.G.
If You Want It (Bad Boy Remix)	1995	Soul for Real
No One Else (Puff Daddy Remix)	1995	Total, Da Brat, Foxy Brown, Lil' Kim
Lay Down (Bad Boy Remix)	1996	Nalini
You're the One (Bad Boy Mix)	1996	SWV, Busta Rhymes
Only You (Remix)	1996	112, Ma$e, Notorious B.I.G.
I Will Survive (Bad Boy Remix)	1996	Chantay Savage
ATLiens (Bad Boy Remix)	1996	Outkast
This Is for the Lover in You (Face to Face Mix)	1996	Babyface, Ghostface Killah
Cold Rock A Party (Bad Boy Mix)	1996	MC Lyte, Missy Elliott
Come See Me (Remix)	1996	112, Black Rob
You Don't Have to Worry (Puff Remix)	1996	New Edition, Missy Elliott
The Things You Do (Bad Boy Remix)	1996	Gina Thompson, Missy Elliott
Just a Touch (Bad Boy Remix)	1997	Keith Sweat, Ma$e
Roxanne 97 (Puff Daddy Remix)	1997	Sting & The Police
Honey (Bad Boy Mix)	1997	Mariah Carey, Ma$e, The Lox
Rapture (Bad Boy Remix)	1997	KRS-One, Puff Daddy
Been Around the World (Remix)	1998	Puff Daddy, Ma$e, Carl Thomas
Trippin' (Remix)	1998	Total, DMX
Sittin Home (Remix)	1999	Total, Shyne
