= G. Dep discography =

- Studio albums: 3
- Singles: 2
- Music videos: 3
- Collaborative albums: 1

This is the discography of American rapper G. Dep.

== Albums ==
=== Studio albums ===
List of studio albums, with selected chart positions
Title	Album details	Peak chart positions	
Title	Album details	US	US R&B
Child of the Ghetto	Released: November 20, 2001 (US); Label: Bad Boy, Arista; Formats: CD, LP, cassette, digital download	106	23
Ghetto Legend	Released: September 7, 2010 (US); Label: Famous Records, Corp; Formats: CD, digital download	—	—
Influential	Released: March 22, 2024; Label: BlackMarketGroup Recordings; Formats: digital download	—	—
"—" denotes a recording that did not chart.

=== Collaborative albums ===
List of collaborative albums, with selected information
Title	Album details
Bad Boy (with Loon)	Released: February 13, 2007 (US); Label: Siccness; Formats: CD, digital download
Stay Ready (with Shzzy 8ando)	Released: July 4, 2025; Label: BlackMarket Group Recordings, Apexhustler Media, Fightbxck; Formats: CD, digital download, streaming

== Singles ==
List of singles, with selected chart positions, showing year released and album name
Title	Year	Peak chart positions			Album
Title	Year	US	US R&B	US Rap	Album
"Let's Get It" (with P. Diddy and Black Rob)	2001	80	18	5	Child of the Ghetto and The Saga Continues...
"Special Delivery"	2001	—	59	3	Child of the Ghetto
"—" denotes a recording that did not chart.

== Other charted songs ==
List of songs, with selected chart positions, showing year released and album name
Title	Year	Peak chart positions	Album
Title	Year	US R&B	Album
"And We"^{[A]} (P. Diddy featuring Black Rob, Big Azz Ko, Kain Cioffie, G. Dep, Foxy Brown, Craig Mack and The Mighty Ha)	2001	102	Barbershop soundtrack
"The Godfather"^{[B]} (P. Diddy featuring Black Rob and G. Dep)	2005	113	Non-album song

== Guest appearances ==
List of non-single guest appearances, with other performing artists, showing year released and album name
Title	Year	Other artist(s)	Album
"The Mall"	1998	Gang Starr, Guru, Shiggy Sha	Moment of Truth
"More Dangerous"	1999	Lil' Cease, Busta Rhymes, Mr. Bristal	The Wonderful World of Cease A Leo
"Pain"	1999	Puff Daddy	Forever
"Reverse"	1999	Puff Daddy, Shyne, Cee Lo Green, Redman, Busta Rhymes, Sauce Money	Forever
"Let Me Get Down"	1999	The Notorious B.I.G., Craig Mack, Missy Elliott	Born Again
"Down the Line Joint"	2000	Black Rob, Mark Curry, Mase, Puff Daddy	Life Story
"B.R."	2000	Black Rob	Life Story
"It's Over Now" (Remix)	2001	112, Shyne	"It's Over Now" single
"The Saga Continues"	2001	P. Diddy, Loon, Black Rob	The Saga Continues...
"That's Crazy"	2001	P. Diddy, Black Rob	The Saga Continues...
"Blast Off"	2001	P. Diddy, Mark Curry, Loon	The Saga Continues...
"Child of the Ghetto"	2001	P. Diddy	The Saga Continues...
"If You Want This Money"	2001	P. Diddy, The Hoodfellaz	The Saga Continues...
"Feelin' So Good" (Bad Boy Remix)	2002	Jennifer Lopez, P. Diddy	J to tha L–O! The Remixes
"Special Delivery" (Remix)	2002	Keith Murray, Craig Mack, Ghostface Killah	We Invented the Remix
"That's Crazy" (Remix)	2002	P. Diddy, Black Rob, Missy Elliott, Snoop Dogg	We Invented the Remix
"You Gets No Love" (Remix)	2002	Faith Evans	We Invented the Remix
"And We"	2002	P. Diddy, Black Rob, Big Azz Ko, Kain Cioffie, Foxy Brown, Craig Mack, The Mighty Ha	Barbershop soundtrack
"Everybody Wanna Shine"	2003	DJ Kayslay, Black Rob, Craig Mack	The Streetsweeper, Vol. 1
"Like Me"	2007	Ginuwine, Loon	I Apologize
"Shrimp and Lobster"	2007	Styles P	Independence
"Special"	2007	Styles P	Independence
"U Ain't Shit"	2010	DMX, Loon	Mixtape

== Music videos ==
List of music videos, with directors, showing year released
Title	Year	Director(s)
"Let's Get It" (with P. Diddy and Black Rob)	2001	Little X
"Special Delivery"	2001	Nick Quested
"Special Delivery" (Remix) (featuring Ghostface Killah, Keith Murray and Craig Mack)	2002	Benny Boom

== Notes ==
- A "And We" did not enter the Hot R&B/Hip-Hop Songs chart, but peaked at number 2 on the Bubbling Under R&B/Hip-Hop Singles chart, which acts as an extension to the Hot R&B/Hip-Hop Songs chart.
- B "The Godfather" did not enter the Hot R&B/Hip-Hop Songs chart, but peaked at number 13 on the Bubbling Under R&B/Hip-Hop Singles chart, which acts as an extension to the Hot R&B/Hip-Hop Songs chart.
