= Bad Boy 20th Anniversary Box Set Edition =

Box set by Various Artists
- Released: August 12, 2016
- Genre: Hip-hop; R&B
- Length: 5:30:53
- Label: Bad Boy; Rhino
- Producer: Sean Combs (exec.); Harve Pierre (co-exec.)

Bad Boy Records chronology
Bad Boy's R&B Hits (2004)	Bad Boy 20th Anniversary; Box Set Edition (2016)

Bad Boy 20th Anniversary Box Set Edition is a box set compilation of songs by the American record label Bad Boy Records released on August 12, 2016, and distributed by Rhino in both digital and physical formats. The collection, curated by Bad Boy's president Harve Pierre, honors the legacy of rapper Sean Combs and his record label celebrating over two decades in hip-hop and R&B.

The box set features 80 tracks across five CDs and includes remastered hits from Puff Daddy (under his various aliases), The Notorious B.I.G., Craig Mack, Faith Evans, Total, Carl Thomas, Mase, 112, The Lox, Cassie, Janelle Monáe, Danity Kane, Machine Gun Kelly, French Montana as well as other Bad Boy artists. It also comes with a 64-page historiography and foreword, written by rap journalist Michael A. Gonzales.

Combs, the Founder and Chairman of Bad Boy Entertainment, talked about the project saying: "We wanted to thank our fans, celebrate the music, the people, and the Bad Boy lifestyle that have defined the past two decades," continuing, "We've always made music that makes the people dance; this collection does all that and more, and it is a celebration of all things Bad Boy." Despite founding the label in 1993, Bad Boy began celebrating their 20th anniversary in 2015 with a 20-minute mega-medley performance at the BET Awards. It stretched into 2016, starting with the label's May reunion sold-out shows at the Barclays Center in Brooklyn, and originating the Bad Boy Family Reunion Tour, starting in North America in the last week of August 2016.

== Track listing ==
Disc one
No.	Title	Performer	Length
1.	"Faith (Interlude)"	Faith Evans	0:41
2.	"Victory" (featuring The Notorious B.I.G. and Busta Rhymes)	Puff Daddy & The Family	4:56
3.	"Warning"	The Notorious B.I.G.	3:39
4.	"Feel So Good"	Mase	3:25
5.	"Angels" (featuring The Notorious B.I.G. and Rick Ross)	Diddy – Dirty Money	5:11
6.	"Come to Me" (featuring Nicole Scherzinger)	Diddy	4:32
7.	"Me & U"	Cassie	3:12
8.	"Pop That" (featuring Rick Ross, Drake and Lil Wayne)	French Montana	5:03
9.	"Notorious Thugs" (featuring Bone Thugs-n-Harmony)	The Notorious B.I.G.	6:07
10.	"Satisfy You" (featuring R. Kelly)	Puff Daddy	4:47
11.	"Can't You See" (featuring The Notorious B.I.G.)	Total	6:01
12.	"You Used to Love Me"	Faith Evans	4:28
13.	"What You Want" (featuring Total)	Mase	4:02
14.	"Dance with Me (Radio Mix)" (featuring Beanie Sigel)	112	4:15
15.	"Flava in Ya Ear" (featuring The Notorious B.I.G., LL Cool J, Busta Rhymes and Rampage)	Craig Mack	3:38
16.	"Juicy"	The Notorious B.I.G.	5:03
Total length:			1:09:00

Disc two
No.	Title	Performer	Length
1.	"Love Like This"	Faith Evans	4:32
2.	"Hypnotize" (featuring Pamela Long)	The Notorious B.I.G.	3:50
3.	"Last Night" (featuring Keyshia Cole)	Diddy	6:26
4.	"I Need A Girl, Pt. 2" (featuring Ginuwine, Loon, Mario Winans and Tammy Ruggieri)	Diddy	4:44
5.	"Peaches & Cream"	112	3:10
6.	"One More Chance / Stay With Me (Remix)"	The Notorious B.I.G.	4:29
7.	"Kissin' You"	Total	4:42
8.	"All My Love (Interlude)"	Carl Thomas	1:56
9.	"Emotional"	Carl Thomas	4:31
10.	"I Don't Wanna Know" (featuring Enya and Diddy)	Mario Winans	4:17
11.	"Who Shot Ya?"	The Notorious B.I.G.	5:19
12.	"Money, Power & Respect" (featuring DMX and Lil' Kim)	The Lox	4:35
13.	"Bad Boyz" (featuring Barrington Levy)	Shyne	4:34
14.	"Shot Caller (Remix)" (featuring Diddy, Rick Ross and Charlie Rock)	French Montana	3:33
15.	"I Love The Dough" (featuring Jay-Z and Angela Winbush)	The Notorious B.I.G.	5:11
16.	"Whoa!"	Black Rob	4:07
Total length:			1:09:56

Disc three
No.	Title	Performer	Length
1.	"Born Again (Intro)"	The Notorious B.I.G.	1:28
2.	"Dead Wrong" (featuring Eminem)	The Notorious B.I.G.	4:57
3.	"Special Delivery (Remix)" (featuring Ghostface Killah, Keith Murray and Craig Mack)	G. Dep	4:34
4.	"Mo Money Mo Problems" (featuring Mase and Puff Daddy)	The Notorious B.I.G.	4:16
5.	"Bad Boy's Been Around The World (Remix)" (featuring Mase and Carl Thomas)	Puff Daddy & The Family	5:17
6.	"Sitting Home"	Total	4:15
7.	"Can't Nobody Hold Me Down" (featuring Mase)	Puff Daddy & The Family	3:50
8.	"Big Poppa"	The Notorious B.I.G.	4:10
9.	"Can't Believe" (feat. Carl Thomas and Shyne)	Faith Evans	4:58
10.	"Bonnie & Shyne" (featuring Barrington Levy)	Shyne	4:17
11.	"Spit Your Game (Remix)" (featuring Twista, Bone Thugs-n-Harmony and 8Ball & MJG)	The Notorious B.I.G.	4:09
12.	"You Don't Want Drama"	8Ball & MJG	4:34
13.	"I Love You Baby" (featuring Black Rob)	Puff Daddy	4:03
14.	"Bad Boy for Life" (featuring Black Rob and Mark Curry)	Diddy	4:13
15.	"Shake Ya Tailfeather" (featuring P. Diddy and Murphy Lee)	Nelly	4:53
16.	"Bad Boy This Bad Boy That"	Da Band	3:16
Total length:			1:07:10

Disc four
No.	Title	Performer	Length
1.	"Let's Get It" (featuring P. Diddy and Black Rob)	G. Dep	4:18
2.	"It's Goin' Down" (featuring Nitti)	Yung Joc	4:03
3.	"Dem Boyz"	Boyz n da Hood	4:17
4.	"Relax and Take Notes" (featuring The Notorious B.I.G. and Project Pat)	8Ball & MJG	4:51
5.	"Hood Nigga"	Gorilla Zoe	3:21
6.	"The Real (Interlude)"	G. Dep	0:53
7.	"Wild Boy" (featuring Waka Flocka Flame)	MGK	3:53
8.	"Get Down"	Craig Mack	3:45
9.	"Only You (Bad Boy Remix)" (feat. The Notorious B.I.G. and Mase)	112	4:45
10.	"Can I Live" (featuring The Lox)	Black Rob	4:59
11.	"24 Hrs. to Live" (featuring The Lox, Black Rob and DMX)	Mase	4:15
12.	"Five-O" (featuring Wyclef and P. Diddy)	Elephant Man	3:56
13.	"That's What You Are (Interlude)"	Carl Thomas	2:19
14.	"Yesterday" (featuring Chris Brown)	Diddy – Dirty Money	4:31
15.	"Down For Me" (featuring Mario Winans)	Loon	4:19
16.	"Last Time"	New Edition	2:46
Total length:			1:01:11

Disc five
No.	Title	Performer	Length
1.	"Room 112 (Intro)"	112	1:00
2.	"When Boy Meets Girl"	Total	4:18
3.	"Fly Together" (featuring Ryan Leslie and Rick Ross)	Red Cafe	4:57
4.	"I Love You" (featuring Jim Jones and Yung Joc)	Cheri Dennis	4:35
5.	"Damaged"	Danity Kane	4:09
6.	"King of Hearts"	Cassie	3:37
7.	"Hot 2Nite"	New Edition	3:23
8.	"Anywhere"	112	4:18
9.	"I Wish"	Carl Thomas	3:48
10.	"Primetime" (featuring Miguel)	Janelle Monáe	4:40
11.	"Since You've Been Gone"	Day26	4:10
12.	"You Are My Joy (Interlude)"	Faith Evans	1:08
13.	"Ms. Wallace (Outro)"	The Notorious B.I.G.	3:18
14.	"We'll Always Love Big Poppa"	The Lox	5:00
15.	"I'll Be Missing You" (featuring Faith Evans and 112)	Puff Daddy & The Family	5:43
16.	"Best Friend" (featuring Mario Winans)	Puff Daddy	5:32
Total length:			1:03:36

== Release history ==
Region	Date	Format	Label(s)	Ref.
Worldwide	August 12, 2016	Box set; digital download	Bad Boy; Rhino	
