= Let's Get It (song) =

Single by P. Diddy, G. Dep and Black Rob

from the album The Saga Continues... and Child of the Ghetto
- Released: April 3, 2001
- Genre: East Coast hip hop
- Length: 4:17
- Label: Bad Boy Entertainment
- Songwriters: Trevell Coleman; Robert Ross; Jeremy Graham; Al Green; Mabon Hodges; Curtis Jackson
- Producers: Yogi "Sugar Bear" Graham; Mario "Yellow Man" Winans (add.)

P. Diddy singles chronology
"Best Friend" (2000)	"Let's Get It" (2001)	"Bad Boy for Life" (2001)

G. Dep singles chronology
"Don't Really Wanna Stop / You Ain't Nobody Baby" (1997)	"Let's Get It" (2001)	"Special Delivery" (2001)

Black Rob singles chronology
"Whoa!" (2000)	"Let's Get It" (2001)	"Bad Boy for Life" (2001)

Music video
- "Let's Get It" on YouTube

"Let's Get It" is a song performed by American rappers P. Diddy, G. Dep and Black Rob. It was released on April 3, 2001, through Bad Boy Entertainment as the first single from P. Diddy & The Bad Boy Family's The Saga Continues... and G. Dep's Child of the Ghetto. Produced by Yogi "Sugar Bear" Graham with additional production by Mario "Yellow Man" Winans, the song contains samples from Al Green's "Love and Happiness". On the August 12, 2022 edition of The Breakfast Club, 50 Cent revealed that he ghostwritten the chorus and P. Diddy’s verses on the song.

The single reached number 80 on the Billboard Hot 100, number 74 on the Radio Songs, number 18 on both Hot R&B/Hip-Hop Songs and R&B/Hip-Hop Airplay. It was also number 26 on the Mainstream R&B/Hip-Hop Airplay, number 5 on the Hot Rap Songs, number 10 on the Rap Airplay, and number 21 on the Hot R&B/Hip-Hop Singles Sales in the United States.

The remix of the song featured Mark Curry, Kain and Loon was released as a hidden track in G. Dep's Child of the Ghetto. Music video was directed by Director X.

== Track listing ==
No.	Title	Length
1.	"Let's Get It" (Club Mix)	4:04
2.	"Let's Get It" (Instrumental)	5:19
3.	"Let's Get It" (Radio Mix)	4:34
4.	"Let's Get It" (Acapella)	4:20
Total length:		18:17

== Personnel ==
- Trevell "G. Dep" Coleman — vocals, songwriter
- Sean "P. Diddy" Combs — vocals, executive producer
- Robert "Black Rob" Ross — vocals, songwriter
- Jeremy "Yogi Bear" Graham — producer, songwriter
- Mario "Yellow Man" Winans — additional producer
- Albert "Al Green" Greene — songwriter
- Mabon "Teenie" Hodges — songwriter
- Harve "Joe Hooker" Pierre — executive producer, A&R

== Charts ==
Chart (2001)	Peak position
US Billboard Hot 100	80
US Hot R&B/Hip-Hop Songs (Billboard)	18
US R&B/Hip-Hop Airplay (Billboard)	18
US Hot Rap Songs (Billboard)	5
