= Special Delivery (song) =

2001 single by G. Dep

Single by G. Dep

from the album Child of the Ghetto
- Released: November 20, 2001
- Recorded: 2001
- Studio: Daddy's House Recording Studios (New York City)
- Genre: Hip-hop
- Length: 6:29
- Label: Bad Boy
- Songwriters: Trevell Coleman; Lamont Porter
- Producer: EZ Elpee

G. Dep singles chronology
"Let's Get It" (2001)	"Special Delivery" (2001)

Music video
- "Special Delivery" on YouTube

"Special Delivery" is a song by American rapper G. Dep. It was released on November 20, 2001 through Bad Boy Entertainment as the second and final single from the rapper's debut studio album Child of the Ghetto. Written by G. Dep and EZ Elpee, it was produced by the latter.

The song did not reach the US Billboard Hot 100, however, it peaked at number 59 on the Hot R&B/Hip-Hop Songs, number 62 on the R&B/Hip-Hop Airplay, number 3 on the Hot Rap Songs and number 7 on the Hot R&B/Hip-Hop Singles Sales charts in the United States.

The accompanying music video for the song was directed by Nick Quested and Harve Pierre, starring G. Dep, P. Diddy and Black Rob as part of a FedEx-like company called "Bad Boy Express", delivering packages to people via delivery truck.

== Remix ==
The official remix version features Ghostface Killah, Keith Murray, Craig Mack and Sean "Diddy" Combs. It was released as the third single off of P. Diddy & The Bad Boy Family 2002 remix album We Invented the Remix. The accompanying music video for "Special Delivery (Remix)" was directed by Benny Boom, with DJ Kid Capri and Loon making cameo appearances. The remix was later also included in the 2016 compilation album Bad Boy 20th Anniversary Box Set Edition.

== Track listing ==
No.	Title	Producer(s)	Length
1.	"Special Delivery" (P. Diddy Extended Club Mix)	Ez Elpee	6:41
2.	"Special Delivery" (P. Diddy Extended Radio Mix)	Ez Elpee	6:41
3.	"Bad Boy for Life" (Club Mix)	Megahertz	4:37
4.	"Bad Boy for Life" (Radio Mix)	Megahertz	4:37
5.	"Bad Boy for Life" (Instrumental)	Megahertz	4:37

== Charts ==
Chart (2001)	Peak position
US Hot R&B/Hip-Hop Songs (Billboard)	59
US R&B/Hip-Hop Airplay (Billboard)	62
US Hot Rap Songs (Billboard)	3
US Hot R&B/Hip-Hop Singles Sales (Billboard)	7
