= Child of the Ghetto =

Studio album by G. Dep
- Released: November 20, 2001
- Recorded: 2001
- Genre: Hip hop
- Length: 71:42
- Label: Bad Boy; Arista
- Producer: Chucky Thompson; Coptic; Delray; DJ Fafu; DJ Storm; EZ Elpee; Joe Hooker; Kenny Black; Knobody; Mario Winans; Mike "Punch" Harper; P. Diddy; Ron "Amen-Ra" Lawrence; Sean C; Spunk Bigga; Yogi "Sugar Bear" Graham

G. Dep chronology
Child of the Ghetto (2001)	Bad Boy (2007)

Singles from Child of the Ghetto
- 1. "Let's Get It" Released: April 3, 2001; 2. "Special Delivery" Released: 2001

Professional ratings
Review scores
Source	Rating
AllMusic	2.5/5 stars
HipHopDX	3.5/5
RapReviews	8/10
The Source	3.5/5 stars
Vibe	4.5/5 marks

Child of the Ghetto is the debut studio album by American rapper G. Dep. It was released on November 20, 2001, through Bad Boy Entertainment/Arista Records.

Production was handled by Yogi Bear, Mario Winans, Sean C, Chucky Thompson, Coptic, Delray, DJ Fafu, DJ Storm, EZ Elpee, Kenny Black, Knobody, Mike "Punch" Harper, Ron "Amen-Ra" Lawrence, Spunk Bigga, P. Diddy and Joe Hooker, with the latter two also serving as executive producers. It features guest appearances from Black Rob, Joe Hooker, P. Diddy, Carl Thomas, Kool G Rap, Lady May, Loon, Mark Curry, Rakim and Shyne.

The album peaked at number 106 on the Billboard 200, number 23 on the Top R&B/Hip-Hop Albums and topped the Heatseekers Albums chart in the United States. It spawned two singles: "Let's Get It" and "Special Delivery". Its lead single, "Let's Get It", peaked at #80 on the Billboard Hot 100, #74 on Radio Songs, #18 on the Hot R&B/Hip-Hop Songs, and #5 on the Hot Rap Songs. "Special Delivery" made it to #59 on the Hot R&B/Hip-Hop Songs, #3 on the Hot Rap Songs, and was later included in 2002 We Invented the Remix version featuring Ghostface Killah, Keith Murray and Craig Mack.

The sales of the album caused G. Dep to subsequently be dropped from Bad Boy Entertainment.

== Track listing ==
No.	Title	Producer(s)	Length
1.	"Intro"	Joe Hooker; DJ Fafu	1:03
2.	"Everyday"	Ron "Amen-Ra" Lawrence and Jay "Griff" Griffin, Keith "Wok" Watts	3:42
3.	"Child of the Ghetto"	Coptic	3:43
4.	"Special Delivery"	EZ Elpee	6:29
5.	"Whatever (Interlude)"		1:16
6.	"Keep It Gangsta" (featuring Shyne)	Sean Cane; Knobody	3:22
7.	"Smash on the First Night" (featuring May and Puff Daddy)	Mario Winans; Puff Daddy; Delray; Kenny Black	4:15
8.	"The Ride"	Chucky Thompson	4:04
9.	"News Report (Interlude)"	Joe Hooker	1:30
10.	"Danger Zone"	Yogi "Sugar Bear" Graham	4:07
11.	"I Am" (featuring Kool G Rap and Rakim)	Yogi "Sugar Bear" Graham	3:58
12.	"Blast Off" (featuring Mark Curry and Loon)	Mike "Punch" Harper	3:38
13.	"The Real (Interlude)"	Yogi "Sugar Bear" Graham	0:53
14.	"Doe Fiend"	Mario Winans; Puff Daddy	3:32
15.	"I Want the World to See" (featuring Joe Hooker)	DJ Storm	3:54
16.	"Let's Get It" (featuring Puff Daddy and Black Rob)	Yogi "Sugar Bear" Graham	4:18
17.	"It's All Over" (featuring Carl Thomas)	Sean Cane	4:27
18.	"One Way" (featuring Black Rob)	Spunk Bigga	3:06
19.	"Straight to the Top (Interlude)"	Joe Hooker	0:38
20.	"Nothing Gonna Stop Me / Let's Get It (Remix)" (featuring Joe Hooker)	Yogi "Sugar Bear" Graham	9:47
Total length:			71:42

Sample credits

- Track 2 contains samples of "If I Die" by Rare Earth
- Track 14 contains samples of "Microphone Fiend" by Eric B. & Rakim and "School Boy Crush" by Average White Band
- Track 15 contains samples of "Touching You" by Stanley Turrentine
- Track 16 contains samples of "Love and Happiness" by Al Green
- Track 17 contains samples of "Ship Ahoy" by The O'Jays
- Track 18 contains samples of "One Way or Another" by Blondie
- Track 20 contains samples of "Nothing Can Stop Me" by Billy Davis Jr. & Marilyn McCoo

Notes

- Tracks 3, 12 and 16 originally appeared on P. Diddy & The Bad Boy Family's 2001 The Saga Continues....
- Track 20 includes hidden bonus track "Let's Get It (Remix)" featuring Black Rob, Mark Curry, Kain, Loon and P. Diddy (5:14), which immediately follows "Nothing Gonna Stop Me" (4:34).

Leftover tracks

- "For The Kids" which samples Ice Cube's "A Gangsta Fairytale" was left off the release of this album.

== Personnel ==
- Trevell Gerald "G. Dep" Coleman — vocals
- Sean "Puffy" Combs — vocals (tracks: 4, 7, 16), producer (tracks: 7, 14), executive producer
- Monifa Heyword — vocals (track 4)
- Jamal Michael "Shyne" Barrow — vocals (track 6)
- Rhonda "Lady May" Robinson — vocals (track 7)
- Nathaniel Thomas "Kool G Rap" Wilson — vocals (track 11)
- William Michael "Rakim" Griffin Jr. — vocals (track 11)
- Mark Curry — vocals (track 12)
- Chauncey Lamont "Loon" Hawkins — vocals (track 12)
- Harve "Joe Hooker" Pierre — vocals (tracks: 15, 20), producer (tracks: 1, 9, 19), executive producer
- Robert "Black Rob" Ross — vocals (tracks: 16, 18)
- Carlton Neron Thomas — vocals (track 17)
- Marc "DJ Fafu" Pfafflin — producer (track 1)
- Ron "Amen-Ra" Lawrence — producer (track 2)
- Eric "Coptic" Matlock — producer (track 3)
- Lamont "Ez Elpee" Porter — producer (track 4)
- Deleno "Sean C" Matthews — producer (tracks: 6, 17)
- Jerome "Knobody" Foster — producer (track 6)
- Mario "Yellowman" Winans — producer (tracks: 7, 14)
- Delray — producer (track 7)
- Jay "Griff" — producer (track 2)
- Kenny Black — producer (track 7)
- Carl Edward "Chucky" Thompson Jr. — producer (track 8)
- Jeremy A. "Yogi Bear" Graham — producer (tracks: 10, 11, 13, 16, 20)
- Michael Harper — producer (track 12)
- D.J. Storm — producer (track 15)
- Anthony "Spunk Bigga" Blagmon — producer (track 18)
- Chris Athens — mastering
- Christopher Stern — art direction
- Daniel Hastings — photography

== Charts ==
Weekly chart performance for Child of the Ghetto
Chart (2001)	Peak position
US Billboard 200	106
US Top R&B/Hip-Hop Albums (Billboard)	23
US Heatseekers Albums (Billboard)	1
