= We Invented the Remix =

2002 remix album by Sean Combs

Remix album by P. Diddy & the Bad Boy Family
- Released: May 14, 2002
- Genres: East Coast hip-hop; R&B
- Length: 56:20
- Labels: Arista; Bad Boy
- Producers: P. Diddy; Mario Winans; Deric "D-Dot" Angelettie; EZ Elpee; Megahertz; Irv Gotti; 7 Aurelius; Ayinde; Buckwild; Daron Jones; Harve "Joe Hooker" Pierre

P. Diddy chronology
The Saga Continues... (2001)	We Invented the Remix (2002)	Press Play (2006)

Bad Boy Records chronology
Bad Boy Greatest Hits: Volume 1 (1998)	We Invented the Remix (2002)	Bad Boys II: The Soundtrack (2003)

Singles from We Invented the Remix
- 1. "I Need a Girl (Part One)" Released: February 25, 2002; 2. "I Need a Girl (Part Two)" Released: May 21, 2002; 3. "Special Delivery (Remix)" Released: 2002

We Invented the Remix is a remix compilation album by American rapper P. Diddy. It was released on May 14, 2002, via Arista Records and P. Diddy's Bad Boy Records. The album is credited to "P. Diddy & the Bad Boy Family"; the latter act refers to guest appearances from his signees at Bad Boy.

The album reached number one of the U.S. Billboard 200 albums chart for a week and was later certified Platinum for shipments of over one million copies. The album sold 256,000 copies in its first week. The album also reached number 17 on the UK Albums Chart. The album featured the hit singles "I Need a Girl (Part 1)", which reached number two in the U.S., and "I Need a Girl (Part 2)", which reached number four, a rare occurrence of both parts of the same song both becoming big hits. This was the last album Bad Boy would release under Arista.

== Critical reception ==
Professional ratings
Review scores
Source	Rating
AllMusic	4/5 stars
Entertainment Weekly	B+
HipHopDX	3.5/5 stars
New York Post	3.5/4 stars
RapReviews	6.0/10
Slant Magazine	2.5/5 stars

Jason Birchmeier of AllMusic praised the album for crafting a collection of top-notch producers and guest artists to create sure-fire hits that are better than those from The Saga Continues..., concluding that "As a result, We Invented the Remix confirms Combs' return to the top of the urban music world after a few years of struggle." Wise Q of HipHopDX also praised the tracks for the producers and guest artists that come up with their own interpretation but questioned if Diddy can keep his remix formula going without losing any creative steam. Steve 'Flash' Juon of RapReviews said that despite great remixes of "Special Delivery" and "I Need a Girl", he criticized P. Diddy's involvement on the album for making terrible choices to songs that were both unoriginal and pointless, concluding that "If anything it proves that some songs DON'T need a remix, and even those that do should be given better treatment than the selection was here. If you can't find the album on sale or at a comparable price it's just not a good investment. The only thing P. Diddy "Invented" here was a mediocre album."

== Track listing ==
#	Title	Length	Lead Artist	Featured Artists	Producer(s)
01	"Intro"	00:51	P. Diddy		Sean "P. Diddy" Combs for the Hitmen
02	"Special Delivery" (Remix)	04:34	G. Dep	Ghostface Killah, Keith Murray and Craig Mack	EZ Elpee
03	"I Need a Girl (Part Two)"	04:46	P. Diddy	Ginuwine, Loon, Mario Winans and Tammy Ruggieri	Sean "P. Diddy" Combs and Mario Winans for the Hitmen
04	"Bad Boy for Life" (Remix)	04:37	P. Diddy	Busta Rhymes and M.O.P.	Megahertz
05	"I Need a Girl (Part One)"	04:26	P. Diddy	Usher and Loon	Sean "P. Diddy" Combs and Mario Winans for the Hitmen
06	"The Remix Phenomenon" (Interlude)	01:14	P. Diddy		Sean "P. Diddy" Combs for the Hitmen
07	"Unfoolish" (Remix)	03:13	Ashanti	The Notorious B.I.G.	Irv Gotti and 7 Aurelius
08	"Dance with Me" (Remix)	04:57	112	Beanie Sigel	Daron Jones
08	"Peaches & Cream" (Remix)	04:57	112	Ludacris	Daron Jones
09	"No More Drama" (Remix)	04:04	Mary J. Blige	P. Diddy	Sean "P. Diddy" Combs and Mario Winans for the Hitmen
10	"So Complete" (Remix)	04:37	P. Diddy	Cheri Dennis	Sean "P. Diddy" Combs and Mario Winans for the Hitmen, Buckwild
11	"Notorious B.I.G." (Remix)	03:41	The Notorious B.I.G.	Lil' Kim and P. Diddy	Deric "D-Dot" Angelettie for the Hitmen
12	"That's Crazy" (Remix)	04:39	P. Diddy	Black Rob, Missy Elliott, Snoop Dogg and G. Dep	Sean "P. Diddy" Combs and Mario Winans for the Hitmen
13	"Woke Up in the Morning" (Remix)	06:04	Carl Thomas	The Notorious B.I.G.	Sean "P. Diddy" Combs, Mario Winans, and Harve "Joe Hooker" Pierre for the Hitmen
14	"You Gets No Love" (Remix)	04:37	Faith Evans	G. Dep	Sean "P. Diddy" Combs and Mario Winans for the Hitmen

== Charts ==
=== Weekly charts ===
Weekly chart performance for We Invented the Remix
Chart (2002)	Peak position
Canadian Albums (Billboard)	8
Canadian R&B Albums (Nielsen SoundScan)	1
US Billboard 200	1
US Top R&B/Hip-Hop Albums (Billboard)	2

=== Year-end charts ===
Year-end chart performance for We Invented the Remix
Chart (2002)	Position
Canadian Albums (Nielsen SoundScan)	80
Canadian R&B Albums (Nielsen SoundScan)	15
Canadian Rap Albums (Nielsen SoundScan)	6
US Billboard 200	48
US Top R&B/Hip-Hop Albums (Billboard)	10

== Certifications ==
Certifications for We Invented the Remix
Region	Certification	Certified units/sales
United Kingdom (BPI)	Gold	100,000^{^}
United States (RIAA)	Platinum	1,000,000^{^}
^{^} Shipments figures based on certification alone.
