= Mark Curry (rapper) =

American rapper

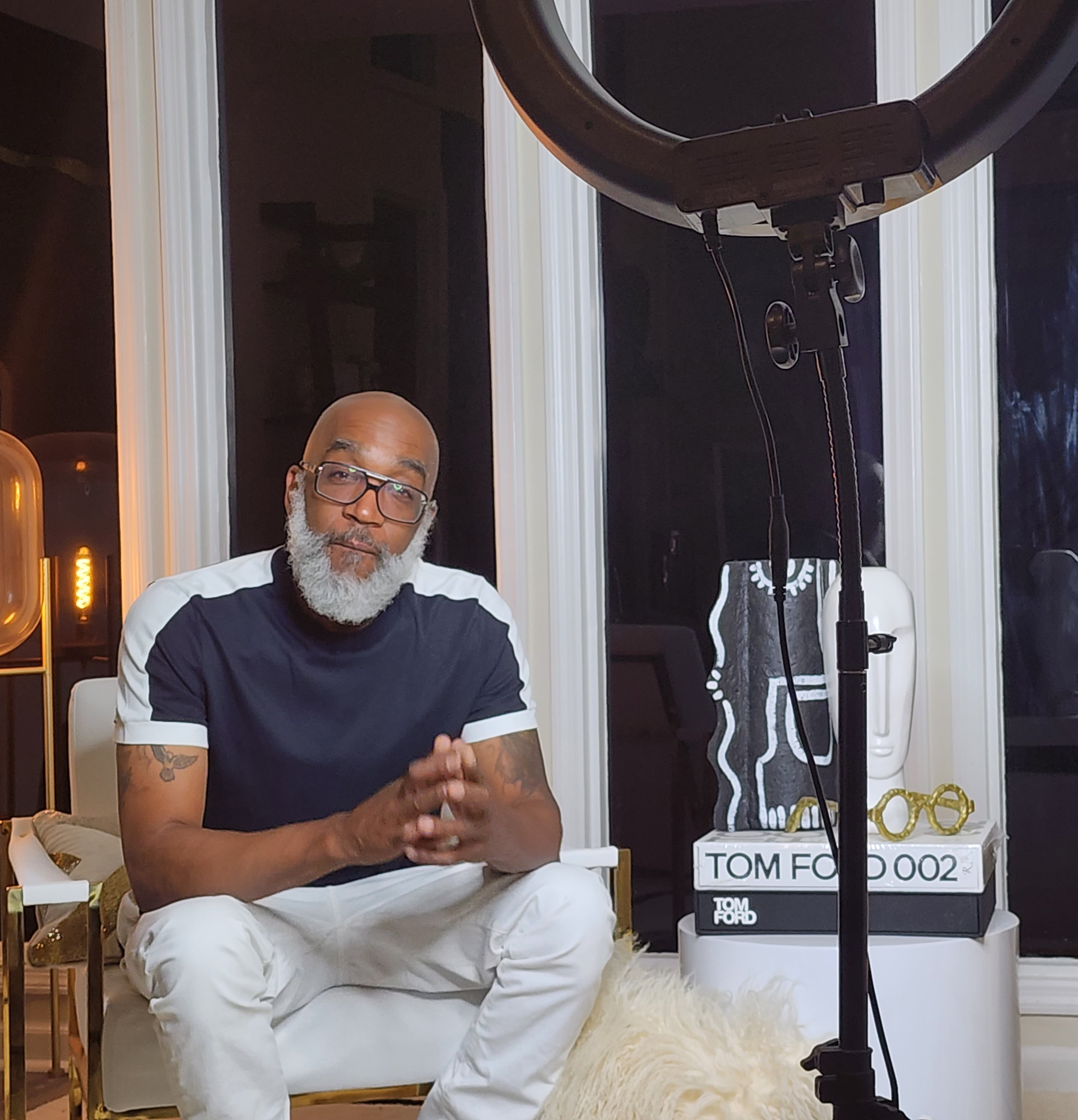
- Curry in 2023

Background information
- Born: Mark Keith Curry; July 15, 1971 (age 54); New Jersey, U.S.
- Genres: East Coast hip-hop
- Occupations: Rapper; songwriter
- Label: Bad Boy

Mark Keith Curry (born July 15, 1971) is an American rapper. He is best known for his 2001 single "Bad Boy for Life" (with Sean Combs and Black Rob), which peaked at number 33 on the Billboard Hot 100 and number 13 on the UK singles chart. In 2009, he published a book, Dancing with the Devil, which contained scurrilous allegations regarding Combs and his Bad Boy Records label.

== Life and career ==
Mark Keith Curry was born on July 15, 1971 in New York, and moved to Teaneck when he was three. His parents separated in 1983; his father relocated to Atlanta in 1986, with Mark following later that year. He initially worked at The Rim Shop, a car accessories boutique in Atlanta, and at Platinum House, described by Curry in 2009 as "a black version of Studio 54 without the kinkiness, and with dancers paid to shed their clothing". At the latter, he met Sean Combs, whose label Bad Boy Records ran "Bad Boy Fridays" parties there to promote Platinum House, and who he would meet again after being introduced via label signee D-Mack. Curry signed to Bad Boy Records in 1997, featured on several tracks from Combs' 2001 album The Saga Continues... including "Bad Boy for Life", and left the label in 2005.

In 2009, Curry released a book, Dancing with the Devil, which he had begun writing in the belief that Combs "would try to deal with me fairly if he knew I was going to air his dirty laundry" and contained a number of scurrilous allegations about Combs and Bad Boy Records, including that Combs had copied Curry's mannerisms and guide vocals verbatim for his 1998 single "Come with Me", that Combs had neglected to invite Curry to the sessions for The Saga Continues... and that the album only featured him because he showed up anyway, that Combs regularly shoehorned himself on to his artists' tracks so that he could charge high "special guest appearances" and that artists only found out once they received their royalty checks, that he regularly muscled his way into unearned songwriting and production credits, that he would insist on his sports cars being featured in artists' music videos so that he could deduct high rental fees from their budgets and that he would then claim tax credits for his cars' business use, that he would flaunt his wealth around the people he was exploiting, that his actions had left Curry so poor while with Bad Boy that he had to sell his backstage passes for shows where he was one of Combs' henchmen and that he had considered selling cannabis towards the end of his Bad Boy career to provide for his family, and that he had lost his house to foreclosure the previous year and was homeless, driving a 1992 Honda Accord he had bought at auction, and unable to afford health insurance for himself, his wife, or his son. He opened a juice bar in Miami in 2014 and took a job in the solar power industry in 2018.

== Discography ==
=== Singles ===
- "Bad Boy for Life" (2001, UK #13, US #33)

=== Other appearances ===
- "Gangsta Shit" (Sean Combs' Forever, 1999)
- "Dangerous MC's" (The Notorious B.I.G.'s Born Again, 1999)
- "Down the Line Shit" and "Muscle Game" (Black Rob's Life Story, 2000)
- "Blast Off", "Where's Sean", "Lonely", "I Don't Like That (Interlude)", "The Last Song", and "Bad Boy for Life" (Sean Combs' The Saga Continues..., 2001)
- "American Dream" (Training Day soundtrack, 2001)
- "Blast Off" and "Let's Get It (Remix)" (G. Dep's Child of the Ghetto, 2001)
