= Diddy (song) =

2001 single by P. Diddy featuring the Neptunes

Single by P. Diddy featuring the Neptunes

from the album The Saga Continues...
- Released: 2001
- Genre: Hip hop
- Length: 4:04
- Label: Bad Boy; Arista
- Songwriters: L. Parker; Chauncey Hawkins; Chad Hugo; Pharrell Williams; Sean Combs
- Producer: The Neptunes

P. Diddy singles chronology
"Bad Boy for Life" (2001)	"Diddy" (2001)	"Trade It All, Pt. 2" (2002)

"Diddy" is a song by American rapper P. Diddy, featuring a guest appearance from American musician Pharrell Williams, who performs the hook. The song was released in 2001 by Bad Boy Records and Arista Records as the third single from Diddy's third studio album, The Saga Continues.... The song was produced by the Neptunes, and written by its performers along with rapper Loon.

The hook borrows elements from the 1988 song "Jimmy" by Boogie Down Productions, from which it was inspired.

== Charts ==
Chart (2001)	Peak position
Australia (ARIA)	31
Australian Urban (ARIA)	11
Belgium (Ultratop Wallonia)	14
Germany (GfK)	59
Scottish Singles Sales (Official Charts)	33
Switzerland (Schweizer Hitparade)	84
UK Singles (Official Charts)	19
UK Hip Hop/R&B (Official Charts)	6
US Billboard Hot 100	66
US Hot R&B/Hip-Hop Songs (Billboard)	21
US Rhythmic Airplay (Billboard)	29

=== Year-end charts ===
Chart (2001)	Position
UK Urban (Music Week)	21
