= Let's Get It =

Let's Get It may refer to:

- Let's Get It: Thug Motivation 101, an album by Young Jeezy released in 2005
- Let's Get It (Cash Out album), an album by Cash Out released in 2014
- "Let's Get It", a song by Smoot featuring Jadakiss and Swizz Beatz, No.98 on the R&B charts in 2003
- "Let's Get It", a 2001 song by G. Dep. feat. P. Diddy and Black Rob; see G. Dep discography

== See also ==
- "Let's Get It Started", song by The Black Eyed Peas
- "Let's Get It On", song by Marvin Gaye
