= Forever (Puff Daddy album) =

1999 studio album by Puff Daddy

Studio album by Puff Daddy
- Released: August 24, 1999
- Recorded: 1998–1999
- Studio: The Hit Factory (New York City)
- Genres: Hip-hop; pop rap
- Length: 73:04
- Labels: Bad Boy; Arista
- Producers: Sean Combs (also exec.); Amen-Ra; Anthony Dent; Carlos Broady; D-Dot; Joe Hooker; J-Dub; Nashiem Myrick; Prestige; Yellow Man; Zach White

Puff Daddy chronology
No Way Out (1997)	Forever (1999)	The Saga Continues... (2001)

Singles from Forever
- 1. "P.E. 2000" Released: July 17, 1999; 2. "Satisfy You" Released: 1999; 3. "Best Friend" Released: February 2000

Forever is the second studio album of American rapper Sean Combs, under the name Puff Daddy. Released on August 24, 1999, by Bad Boy Records and Arista Records, the album debuted at number two on the Billboard 200, received platinum certification by the Recording Industry Association of America (RIAA), and sold 205,343 units in its first week. Despite this, Forever was met with mixed to negative reviews and failed to match the success of his previous album, No Way Out (1997).

Forever was Combs' only album to be released solely under the name of "Puff Daddy"; his debut album, No Way Out was billed under "Puff Daddy & the Bad Boy Family". As with previous Bad Boy releases, much of the criticism was directed towards the over-commercialization of the hip hop genre and its incorporation of dance-pop, lower production quality and lackluster lyrics compared to its predecessor, many of which caused controversy at the time.

== Background and production ==
Forever was released two years following the release of his first album, No Way Out, which debuted atop the US Billboard 200 and won a Grammy Award. After its release, he collaborated with Jimmy Page of Led Zeppelin to release the 1998 single "Come with Me," for the 1998 film Godzilla. The song reached number two on the UK Singles Chart and number four on the US Billboard Hot 100. During that summer, the recording for Forever began, and continued into the following year.

== Critical reception ==
Professional ratings
Review scores
Source	Rating
AllMusic	3/5 stars
Christgau's Consumer Guide	C+
Entertainment Weekly	B−
Los Angeles Times	2/4 stars
NME	6/10
Rolling Stone	2.5/5 stars
SonicNet	3/5 stars
The Source	3/5 stars
Spin	6/10
USA Today	3/4 stars

Forever received mixed reviews from critics. Keith Farley of AllMusic called the album "a solid production, not quite as exciting as it should be" but praised Puff Daddy for an improved rapping style from his previous album. For SonicNet, Kembrew McLeod commented that the sampling "choices are a bit more subtle" than No Way Out. However, Tom Sinclair of Entertainment Weekly described the album as "brimming with megalomania, paranoia, and a comically solipsistic worldview" and Puff Daddy's rapping as a "curiously dead monotone".

In 2006, Q magazine included Forever in their list of the 50 worst albums of all time.

== Commercial performance ==
Forever debuted at number 2 on the Billboard 200, selling 205,343 copies behind Christina Aguilera's self-titled album with first week sales of 252,800 copies. The album opened at the top spot of the Top R&B/Hip-Hop Albums chart. In the United Kingdom, the album peaked at number nine on the UK Albums Chart.

- For Black Panties: The album debuted at number one on the UK R&B Chart. In Canada, the album opened at number four on the Canadian Albums Chart, becoming Combs' highest-charting album in the country. As of September 24, 1999, Forever has been certified platinum by the Recording Industry Association of America (RIAA), for selling 1,000,000 copies.

== Track listing ==
Credits adapted from the album's liner notes.

No.	Title	Writer(s)	Producer(s)	Length
1.	"Intro"	Sean Combs; Mario Winans; Steve Coe; Martin Smith	Sean "Puffy" Combs; Mario "Yellow Man" Winans	1:51
2.	"What You Want"	Combs; Ronald Greene; Zach White	Zach White	4:30
3.	"I'll Do This for You" (featuring Kelly Price)	Combs; Chauncey Hawkins; Kelly Price; Ron Lawrence; Winans; Carl Driggs; Ish Ledesma; Mason Betha	Ron "Amen-Ra" Lawrence; Sean "Puffy" Combs; Mario "Yellow Man" Winans	5:00
4.	"Do You Like It... Do You Want It..." (featuring Jay-Z)	Combs; Shawn Carter; Dave Vanderpool; James Todd Smith	Dave "Prestige" Vanderpool; Sean "Puffy" Combs	3:54
5.	"Satisfy You" (featuring R. Kelly)	Combs; Jeffrey Walker; Greene; Price; Robert Kelly; Denzil Foster; Jay King; Thomas McElroy	Sean "Puffy" Combs; Jeffrey "J-Dub" Walker	4:48
6.	"Is This the End? (Part Two)" (featuring Twista)	Combs; Carl Mitchell; Jack Knight; Anthony Dent	Dent; Sean "Puffy" Combs	4:40
7.	"I Hear Voices" (featuring Carl Thomas)	Combs; Mark Curry; Nashiem Myrick; Carlos Broady; Ryo Kawasaki	Nashiem Myrick; Carlos Broady; Sean "Puffy" Combs	5:14
8.	"Fake Thugs Dedication" (featuring Redman)	Combs; Carter; Reggie Noble; Freddie Byrd; Lana Moorer	Sean "Puffy" Combs	3:13
9.	"Diddy Speaks (Interlude)"	Combs	Sean "Puffy" Combs	1:11
10.	"Angels With Dirty Faces" (featuring Bizzy Bone)	Combs; Lawrence; Bryon McCane; Zane Copeland; Maurice White; Verdine White; Eddie del Barrio	Ron "Amen-Ra" Lawrence; Sean "Puffy" Combs	4:10
11.	"Gangsta Shit" (featuring Lil' Kim and Mark Curry)	Combs; Curry; Kimberly Jones; Winans	Mario "Yellow Man" Winans; Sean "Puffy" Combs	4:42
12.	"P.S. 112 (Interlude)"	A.J. Johnson; Harve Pierre	Harve "Joe Hooker" Pierre	0:59
13.	"Pain" (featuring G. Dep)	Combs; Trevell Coleman; Myrick; Broady; Les McCann	Nashiem Myrick; Carlos Broady; Sean "Puffy" Combs	3:56
14.	"Reverse" (featuring Shyne, G. Dep, Cee-Lo, Busta Rhymes, Sauce Money, and Redman)	Combs; Jamal Barrow; Coleman; Reggie Noble; Thomas Barton; Trevor Smith; Myrick; Broady; Nickolas Ashford; Valerie Simpson	Nashiem Myrick; Carlos Broady	5:07
15.	"Real Niggas" (featuring the Notorious B.I.G. and Lil' Kim)	Combs; Christopher Wallace; Kimberly Jones; Deric Angelettie	Deric "D-Dot" Angelettie	4:01
16.	"Journey Through the Life" (featuring Nas, Beanie Sigel, Lil' Kim, and Joe Hooker)	Combs; Nasir Jones; Dwight Grant; Myrick; Broady; Pierre	Nashiem Myrick; Carlos Broady; Sean "Puffy" Combs	4:55
17.	"Best Friend" (featuring Mario Winans)	Combs; Winans; Christopher Cross	Sean "Puffy" Combs; Mario "Yellow Man" Winans	5:32
18.	"Mad Rapper (Interlude)"	Angelettie	Deric "D-Dot" Angelettie	1:14
19.	"P.E. 2000" (featuring Hurricane G)	Combs; Curry; Greene; Hank Shocklee; Carlton Ridenhour	Sean "Puffy" Combs	4:52
Total length:				73:04

Sample credits

- "Journey Through the Life" contains a sample of "For the Good Times", written by Kris Kristofferson, as performed by Al Green.
- "I'll Do This for You" contains a sample of "Get Off", written by Carl Driggs and Ish Ledesma, as performed by Foxy.
- "Do You Want It... Do You Like It..." contains an interpolation of "Wanna Get Paid", as performed by LL Cool J and the Lost Boyz.
- "I Hear Voices" contains a sample of "Bamboo Child" by Ryo Kawasaki.
- "Fake Thugs Dedication" samples "Paper Thin", written by Lana Michelle Moorer and Freddie Byrd, as performed by MC Lyte, and "Shining Star", written by Maurice White, Larry Dunn, and Philip Bailey, as performed by Earth, Wind & Fire.
- "Angels With Dirty Faces" samples "Fantasy", written by Maurice White, Verdine White, and Eddie del Barrio, as performed by Earth, Wind & Fire.
- "Satisfy You" samples "I Got 5 on It", written by Jerold Dwight Ellis III and Garrick Husbands, as performed by Luniz, "Why You Treat Me So Bad", written by Denzil Foster, Jay King, and Thomas McElroy, as performed by Club Nouveau, and "Sexual Healing", written by Marvin Gaye and Odell Brown, as performed by Gaye.
- "P.E. 2000" contains a sample of "Public Enemy No.1", written by Carlton Douglas Ridenhour and Hank Shocklee, as performed by Public Enemy and "Blow Your Head" written by Fred Wesley and James Brown as performed by Wesley and the J.B.'s.
- "Best Friend" contains a sample of "Sailing", written and performed by Christopher Cross.
- "Pain (Forever)" contains a sample of "Benjamin", written and performed by Les McCann and "Children's Story"
- "Reverse" contains a sample of "Romeo" by the Dynamic Superiors.
- "Real Niggas" contains a sample of "Real Niggaz", written by Christopher Wallace, as performed by the Notorious B.I.G.

== Charts ==
=== Weekly charts ===
Chart (1999–2000)	Peak position
Australian Albums (ARIA)	17
Austrian Albums (Ö3 Austria)	19
Belgian Albums (Ultratop Flanders)	31
Canadian Albums (Billboard)	4
Canadian R&B Albums (Nielsen SoundScan)	3
Dutch Albums (Album Top 100)	26
Estonian Albums (Eesti Top 10)	3
Finnish Albums (Suomen virallinen lista)	37
French Albums (SNEP)	14
German Albums (Offizielle Top 100)	4
Scottish Albums (Official Charts)	26
Swedish Albums (Sverigetopplistan)	40
Swiss Albums (Schweizer Hitparade)	7
UK Albums (Official Charts)	9
UK R&B Albums (Official Charts)	1
US Billboard 200	2
US Top R&B/Hip-Hop Albums (Billboard)	1

=== Year-end charts ===
Chart (1999)	Position
German Albums (Offizielle Top 100)	64
US Billboard 200	92
US Top R&B/Hip Hop Albums (Billboard)	51

== Certifications and sales ==
Region	Certification	Certified units/sales
Germany	—	200,000
Japan (RIAJ)	Gold	100,000^{^}
United Kingdom (BPI)	Gold	100,000^{^}
United States (RIAA)	Platinum	1,000,000^{^}
^{^} Shipments figures based on certification alone.

== Singles ==
Single Information
"P.E. 2000"
- Released: 1999
- Hot Rap Songs: #6
- Hot R&B/Hip-Hop Singles & Tracks: #34
"Satisfy You"
- Released: 1999
- Billboard Hot 100: #2
- Hot Rap Songs: #1
- Hot R&B/Hip-Hop Singles & Tracks: #1
"Best Friend"
- Released: 2000
- Billboard Hot 100: #59
- Hot R&B/Hip Hip Singles & Tracks: #67

== See also ==
- List of number-one R&B albums of 1999 (U.S.)
