= Come with Me (Puff Daddy song) =

1998 single by Puff Daddy and Jimmy Page

Single by Puff Daddy featuring Jimmy Page

from the album Godzilla: The Album
- Released: May 18, 1998
- Genre: Rap rock
- Length: 6:11 (album version); 4:31 (radio edit)
- Label: Bad Boy; Epic
- Songwriters: Jimmy Page; Robert Plant; John Bonham; Sean Combs; Mark Curry
- Producer: Sean "Puffy" Combs

Puff Daddy singles chronology
"Victory" (1998)	"Come with Me" (1998)	"Lookin' at Me" (1998)

Music video
- "Come with Me" on YouTube

"Come with Me" is a song by American rapper Puff Daddy, featuring English guitarist Jimmy Page of Led Zeppelin, from the soundtrack to the 1998 film Godzilla. The song samples the 1975 Led Zeppelin song "Kashmir". Page and Rage Against the Machine guitarist Tom Morello also supplied live guitar parts, with Morello additionally playing bass on the song. The song also features heavy orchestral elements.

Released as the soundtrack's third single on June 9, 1998, "Come with Me" reached number one in Iceland, number two in the UK, number three in New Zealand, and number four in the US. It was a top-five hit in several European countries. Its music video was directed by Howard Greenhalgh.

== Background ==
The lyrics of "Come with Me" were written by Bad Boy artist Mark Curry for Puff Daddy to perform. In his book Dancing With the Devil: How Puff Burned the Bad Boys of Hiphop, Curry claims that Puff Daddy followed his reference vocal so closely that he copied Curry's facial expressions and hand movements during the recording.

== Charts ==
=== Weekly charts ===
Chart (1998)	Peak position
Australia (ARIA)	10
Austria (Ö3 Austria Top 40)	3
Belgium (Ultratop 50 Flanders)	10
Belgium (Ultratop 50 Wallonia)	5
Canada (Nielsen SoundScan)	7
Estonia (Eesti Top 20)	10
Europe (Eurochart Hot 100)	3
Finland (Suomen virallinen lista)	3
France (SNEP)	8
Germany (GfK)	3
Greece (IFPI)	3
Hungary (Mahasz)	2
Iceland (Íslenski Listinn Topp 40)	1
Ireland (IRMA)	2
Netherlands (Dutch Top 40)	9
Netherlands (Single Top 100)	8
New Zealand (Recorded Music NZ)	3
Norway (VG-lista)	8
Scottish Singles Sales (Official Charts)	2
Sweden (Sverigetopplistan)	12
Switzerland (Schweizer Hitparade)	2
UK Singles (Official Charts)	2
UK Hip Hop/R&B (Official Charts)	1
US Billboard Hot 100	4
US Hot R&B/Hip-Hop Songs (Billboard)	19
US Hot Rap Songs (Billboard)	1

=== Year-end charts ===
Chart (1998)	Position
Australia (ARIA)	62
Austria (Ö3 Austria Top 40)	17
Belgium (Ultratop 50 Flanders)	47
Belgium (Ultratop 50 Wallonia)	16
Europe (Eurochart Hot 100)	17
France (SNEP)	47
Germany (Media Control)	15
Iceland (Íslenski Listinn Topp 40)	4
Netherlands (Dutch Top 40)	37
Netherlands (Single Top 100)	46
New Zealand (RIANZ)	41
Sweden (Hitlistan)	39
Switzerland (Schweizer Hitparade)	11
UK Singles (OCC)	89
US Billboard Hot 100	47
US Hot Rap Singles (Billboard)	28

=== Decade-end charts ===
Chart (1990–1999)	Rank
Austria (Ö3 Austria Top 40)	76

== Certifications ==
Region	Certification	Certified units/sales
Australia (ARIA)	Gold	35,000^{^}
Austria (IFPI Austria)	Gold	25,000^{*}
Belgium (BRMA)	Platinum	50,000^{*}
France (SNEP)	Gold	250,000^{*}
Germany (BVMI)	Platinum	500,000^{^}
New Zealand (RMNZ)	Gold	5,000^{*}
Sweden (GLF)	Gold	15,000^{^}
Switzerland (IFPI Switzerland)	Gold	25,000^{^}
United Kingdom (BPI)	Silver	200,000^{^}
United States (RIAA)	Platinum	1,000,000
^{*} Sales figures based on certification alone.^{^} Shipments figures based on certification alone.

== Release history ==
Region	Date	Format(s)	Label(s)	Ref(s).
United States	May 18, 1998	Modern rock radio	Epic	
United States	May 19, 1998	Contemporary hit; rhythmic contemporary; urban radio	Epic	
United States	June 9, 1998	CD; cassette	Epic	
United Kingdom	July 27, 1998	CD; cassette	Epic	

== In popular culture ==
- Combs and Page performed the song on Saturday Night Live's 23rd season finale, hosted by David Duchovny which aired on May 9, 1998.
- In France, the song is played when football club Olympique de Marseille scores a goal.
- The song played for New York Yankees shortstop Derek Jeter when he would come up to the plate.
- The song is used as an intro to the final stage in the Italian game show, Avanti un altro!.
- The song has frequently been played during the popular and historical Swedish ski-race Vasaloppet.
