= Bad Boy for Life =

2001 single by P. Diddy, Black Rob and Mark Curry

Single by P. Diddy, Black Rob and Mark Curry

from the album The Saga Continues...
- Released: July 10, 2001
- Length: 4:13
- Label: Bad Boy; Arista
- Songwriters: Dorsey Wesley; Mark Curry; Robert Ross; Jamel Fisher; Drayton Goss
- Producer: Megahertz

P. Diddy singles chronology
"Let's Get It" (2001)	"Bad Boy for Life" (2001)	"Diddy" (2001)

Black Rob singles chronology
"Whoa!" (2000)	"Bad Boy for Life" (2001)	"Let's Get it" (2001)

"Bad Boy for Life" is a song by American rappers P. Diddy, Black Rob and Mark Curry, featured on P. Diddy's third studio album The Saga Continues.... Produced by Megahertz (Dorsey Wesley), it was released as the second single from the album in July 2001 and reached number 33 on the US Billboard Hot 100 chart.

== Background ==
"Bad Boy for Life" was produced in 1998 but was not released until 2001. In reviews of the album, "Bad Boy for Life" has been identified as a declaration of strength by Diddy's label Bad Boy Records. Jason Birchmeier of music website Allmusic explains that the song summarises the claim "that [the] Bad Boy empire is in fact still an empire", while Entertainment Weekly reviewer David Browne similarly points out the lyric "It's official/I survived what I been through" as a declaration of strength. Soren Baker of the Los Angeles Times identifies "Bad Boy for Life", in addition to previous single "Let's Get It", as particularly important to the success of the album.

== Music video ==
The music video for "Bad Boy for Life" was directed by Chris Robinson, filmed in June 2001 and released in early July, and features a number of cameo appearances including guitarist Dave Navarro, drummer Travis Barker, actors Ben Stiller and Richard Dunn, rappers Xzibit, Ice Cube, Snoop Dogg and Fonzworth Bentley, boxer Mike Tyson, television host Pat O'Brien, basketball players Shaquille O'Neal and Baron Davis and rap rock band Crazy Town. The video was nominated for Best Rap Video at both the 2002 MVPA Awards and the 2002 MTV Video Music Awards.

== Track listing ==
12" vinyl (78612-79400-1)
No.	Title	Writer(s)	Length
1.	"Bad Boy for Life" (club mix)	Wesley, Curry, Ross, Fisher, Goss	4:09
2.	"Bad Boy for Life" (instrumental)	Wesley, Curry, Ross, Fisher, Goss	4:09
3.	"Bad Boy for Life" (radio mix)	Wesley, Curry, Ross, Fisher, Goss	4:09
4.	"Bad Boy for Life" (acapella)	Wesley, Curry, Ross, Fisher, Goss	4:09
Total length:			16:36

European CD single (Arista 74321 88431 2)
No.	Title	Writer(s)	Length
1.	"Bad Boy for Life"	Wesley, Curry, Ross, Fisher, Goss	4:13
2.	"Let's Get It"	Trevell Coleman, Jeremy Graham, Ross, Al Green, Mabon Hodge	4:16
Total length:			8:29

European maxi single (Arista 74321 88430 2)
No.	Title	Writer(s)	Length
1.	"Bad Boy for Life" (club mix)	Wesley, Curry, Ross, Fisher, Goss	4:13
2.	"Bad Boy for Life" (instrumental)	Wesley, Curry, Ross, Fisher, Goss	4:13
3.	"Let's Get It" (club mix)	Coleman, Graham, Ross, Green, Hodge	4:16
4.	"Let's Get It" (remix)	Coleman, Graham, Ross, Green, Hodge	4:01
5.	"Can't Believe" (club mix)	Sean Combs, Mario Winans, Mechalie Jamison, Michael Jones, Jack Knight, Andre Young, Chris Taylor, Nasir Jones, Jermain Baxter, Anthony Cruz	3:49
6.	"Hoodfellaz" (club mix)	Graham, Ronald Smith, Chris Moss, Kamau Herbert, Goss	4:03
Total length:			24:35

United Kingdom 12" vinyl (Arista 74321 88998 1)
No.	Title	Writer(s)	Length
1.	"Bad Boy for Life"	Wesley, Curry, Ross, Fisher, Goss	4:09
2.	"Bad Boy for Life" (instrumental)	Wesley, Curry, Ross, Fisher, Goss	4:09
3.	"Let's Get It" (remix)	Coleman, Graham, Ross, Green, Hodge	5:19
4.	"Let's Get It" (instrumental)	Coleman, Graham, Ross, Green, Hodge	4:30
Total length:			18:07

United Kingdom maxi single (Arista 74321 88998 2)
No.	Title	Writer(s)	Length
1.	"Bad Boy for Life"	Wesley, Curry, Ross, Fisher, Goss	4:09
2.	"Bad Boy for Life" (instrumental)	Wesley, Curry, Ross, Fisher, Goss	4:09
3.	"Let's Get It" (remix)	Coleman, Graham, Ross, Green, Hodge	5:19
4.	"Bad Boy for Life" (music video)	Wesley, Curry, Ross, Fisher, Goss	5:56
Total length:			19:33

== Credits and samples ==
"Bad Boy for Life"

- Performed by P. Diddy, Black Rob and Mark Curry
- Produced by Megahertz Music Group
- Vocal production by Harve "Joe Hooker" Pierre

"Let's Get It"

- Performed by Three The... featuring G. Dep, P. Diddy and Black Rob
- Produced by Yogi
- Additional production by Mario "Yellow Man" Winans
- Vocal production by Harve "Joe Hooker" Pierre
- Contains excerpts of "Love & Happiness" by Al Green

"Let's Get It" (remix)

- Performed by Three The... featuring Kain, Mark Curry, Loon, G. Dep, P. Diddy and Black Rob

"Can't Believe"

- Performed by Faith Evans featuring Carl Thomas
- Produced by Sean "P. Diddy" Combs and Mario "Yellow Man" Winans
- Contains excerpts from "Phone Tap" by The Firm

"Hoodfellaz"

- Performed by The Hoodfellaz
- Produced by Yogi

== Charts ==
=== Weekly charts ===
Chart (2001)	Peak position
Australia (ARIA)	20
Austria (Ö3 Austria Top 40)	41
Belgium (Ultratop 50 Flanders)	14
Belgium (Ultratop 50 Wallonia)	7
Europe (Eurochart Hot 100)	19
Germany (GfK)	6
Netherlands (Dutch Top 40)	23
Netherlands (Single Top 100)	17
Scotland Singles (OCC)	15
Sweden (Sverigetopplistan)	32
Switzerland (Schweizer Hitparade)	20
UK Singles (OCC)	13
UK Hip Hop/R&B (OCC)	3
US Billboard Hot 100	33
US Hot R&B/Hip-Hop Songs (Billboard)	13
US Hot Rap Songs (Billboard)	5
US Rhythmic Airplay (Billboard)	15

=== Year-end charts ===
Chart (2001)	Position
Australia (ARIA)	96
Belgium (Ultratop 50 Wallonia)	71
Germany (Media Control)	76
UK Singles (OCC)	187
US Hot R&B/Hip-Hop Singles & Tracks (Billboard)	74
US Rhythmic Top 40 (Billboard)	76

== Certifications ==
Certifications for "Bad Boy for Life"
Region	Certification	Certified units/sales
New Zealand (RMNZ)	Gold	15,000^{‡}
^{‡} Sales+streaming figures based on certification alone.

== Release history ==
Region	Date	Format(s)	Label(s)	Ref.
United States	June 26, 2001	Urban radio	Bad Boy; Arista	
United States	July 10, 2001	12-inch vinyl	Bad Boy; Arista	
United Kingdom	September 24, 2001	12-inch vinyl; CD; cassette	Bad Boy; Arista	
Australia	October 1, 2001	CD	Bad Boy; Arista	

== In other media ==
Jesy Nelson's 2021 debut single "Boyz", featuring Nicki Minaj, prominently samples the baseline and the final lyrics of the song.
