= The Saga Continues... =

2001 studio album by Sean Combs

Studio album by P. Diddy & the Bad Boy Family
- Released: July 10, 2001
- Recorded: 2000–2001
- Genres: Hip hop; R&B
- Length: 77:16
- Labels: Bad Boy; Arista
- Producers: Sean "P. Diddy" Combs (exec.); Megahertz; Mario Winans; the Neptunes; Buckwild; Bink!; the Hitmen

P. Diddy & the Bad Boy Family chronology
Forever (1999)	The Saga Continues... (2001)	We Invented the Remix (2002)

Singles from The Saga Continues...
- 1. "Let's Get It" Released: April 3, 2001; 2. "Bad Boy for Life" Released: November 27, 2001; 3. "Diddy" Released: 2001

The Saga Continues... is the third studio album by American rapper P. Diddy, released on July 10, 2001 by Arista and Bad Boy Records. Similarly to his debut album No Way Out (1997), it is credited to "P. Diddy and the Bad Boy Family"; the latter act refers to his signees at Bad Boy Records. It was the first studio album released by Combs under the P. Diddy name, and his final release under Bad Boy Records' joint venture with Arista Records. His We Invented the Remix album was the last overall project with Arista.

The album garnered mixed to negative reviews from music critics. The Saga Continues... debuted at number two on the Billboard 200 and topped the Top R&B/Hip-Hop Albums chart, spawning three singles: "Let's Get It", "Bad Boy for Life" and "Diddy".

== Critical reception ==
Professional ratings
Review scores
Source	Rating
AllMusic	3/5 stars
Christgau's Consumer Guide	(choice cut)
Entertainment Weekly	C
The Guardian	2/5 stars
HipHopDX	4/5 stars
Los Angeles Times	3/4 stars
NME	3/5 stars
RapReviews	6.5/10
Rolling Stone	2.5/5 stars
The Source	4/5 stars

Soren Baker of the Los Angeles Times called the album "a quality hip-hop collection with plenty of swagger, grit, sure-shot singles and a decidedly upbeat outlook." A staff writer for HipHopDX praised the record for having a diverse roster of new artists and label alumni on "solid cuts" ("Can't Believe", "Let's Get It", "Bad Boy For Life") and "hidden gems" ("So Complete", "Blast Off"), but criticized P. Diddy's "lyrical flow and tempo" for being poorly showcased ("Lonely", "If You Want This Money").

They highlighted G. Dep's "Child of the Ghetto" and 8Ball & MJG's "Roll with Me" as "regrettable displays" concluding that, "With the platform of platinum and pop success, The Saga Continues will be a surefire collection that has the following of P.Diddy's string of commercial hits. Forecasting his true signature talent, by seizing his roster with diverse talent that accompanies his background arrangements."

Steve 'Flash' Juon of RapReviews gave praise to "Bad Boy For Life" and "Where's Sean?" for being "surprisingly dope cuts", P. Diddy's contributions on "Roll with Me" and "I Need a Girl", and G. Dep's "Child of the Ghetto". He criticized "Diddy" for having "one of the weakest ever Neptunes beats", the overabundance of interludes throughout the album and questioned the sampling choices on "Can't Believe" and the title track.

AllMusic's Jason Birchmeier praised the record for giving Black Rob and G. Dep the spotlight to "showcase their talent commendably" along with the other roster members and the in-house approach to the production for giving a "cohesive feel", but criticized P. Diddy's "rhetorical swagger" throughout the track listing for "teetering on the fine line between self-assurance and unintentional farce."

Robert Christgau cited "That's Crazy" as a "choice cut", indicating a good song on "an album that isn't worth your time or money." The Guardian's Alexis Petridis criticized P. Diddy for still being "a terrible rapper, cursed with a stilted and flat delivery" that's overshadowed by his obscure label members' "shouty contributions" and for lacking the "self-pitying repugnance" from Forever, concluding that: "Puzzling over the album's confused morality and logic is more rewarding than actually listening to its familiar litany of misogyny and violence. It's all been done before and by more talented rappers than Combs and pals."

== Track listing ==
#	Title	Length	Featured artists	Producer(s)	Samples
1	"The Saga Continues (Intro)"	3:52	G. Dep; Loon; Black Rob	Yago; P. Diddy; Mario Winans for The Hitmen	"Sirius" by The Alan Parsons Project
2	"Bad Boy for Life"	4:13	Black Rob; Mark Curry	Megahertz	
3	"Toe Game (Interlude)"	1:06	Black Rob		
4	"That's Crazy"	4:07	G. Dep; Black Rob	Aydine; Mario Winans; P. Diddy for The Hitmen	"I Can Read Between the Lines" by Johnny Taylor
5	"Let's Get It"	4:16	G. Dep; Black Rob	Yogi; Mario Winans	"Love and Happiness" by Al Green
6	"Shiny Suit Man (Interlude)"	1:06			
7	"Diddy"	3:55	The Neptunes	The Neptunes	"Jimmy" by Boogie Down Productions; "Paid in Full" by Eric B & Rakim
8	"Blast Off"	3:41	G. Dep; Mark Curry; Loon	Mike "Punch" Harper	
9	"Airport (Interlude)"	0:28			
10	"Roll with Me"	4:53	8Ball & MJG; Faith Evans	Spike; Jamal	"One Thousand Finger Man" by J. Cain and C. Camero
11	"On Top"	3:58	Loon; Marsha Morrison	Mario Winans; P. Diddy; Steven "Loss Spirits" Dorsain	
12	"Where's Sean?"	5:06	Big Azz Ko; Black Rob; Kain; Loon; Mark Curry; Bristal	Mario Winans; P. Diddy; "The Natural"	"Fantasy" by The James Last Band
13	"Child of the Ghetto"	3:43	G. Dep	Coptic; D. Trotman	
14	"Incomplete (Interlude)"	0:58	Cheri Dennis		
15	"So Complete"	3:37	Cheri Dennis	Buckwild; P. Diddy; Mario Winans for The Hitmen	"Like Running Water" by C. Reid
16	"Smoke (Interlude)"	0:16			
17	"Lonely"	3:59	Mark Curry; Kain; Kokane	Mario Winans; P. Diddy for The Hitmen	
18	"I Need a Girl (To Bella)"	4:12	Loon; Lo; Jack and Mario Winans	Coptic	"Coco" by Joe Thomas
19	"Nothing's Gonna Stop Me Now (Interlude)"	2:24	Faith Evans; Mario Winans		"Memories Are That Way" by Bill Withers
20	"If You Want This Money"	3:59	G. Dep; The HoodFellaz	Yogi	"P.S.K. What Does It Mean?" by Schoolly D
21	"I Don't Like That (Interlude)"	1:04	Bristal; Mark Curry		
22	"Back for Good Now"	4:26	Cheri Dennis; Black Rob; Loon	The Natural	"The Children of Sanchez" by Chuck Mangione; "Jam on the Groove" by Ralph MacDonald; "Top Billin" by Audio Two; "I Got It Made" by Special Ed
23	"Can't Believe"	3:49	Faith Evans; Carl Thomas	Mario Winans; P. Diddy for The Hitmen	"Phone Tap" by The Firm
24	"The Last Song"	3:50	Mark Curry; Big Azz Ko; Loon	Bink	
25	"Thank You (Outro)"	0:34			

== Singles ==
- "Diddy"
- "Bad Boy for Life"
- "Let's Get It"
- "I Need a Girl (To Bella)"
  - Released in the form of two remixes: Pt. 1 (featuring Usher and Loon) and Pt. 2 (featuring Mario Winans, Ginuwine and Loon). Both appeared on We Invented The Remix Vol. 1 and had a respective music video. The original version appears on certain "I Need a Girl (Pt. 1)" singles.

== Personnel ==
Credits adapted from the liner notes of The Saga Continues....

- Harve Pierre – associate executive producer
- Chris Athens – mastering (Sterling Sound)
- Roger Che, Jimmy Lee Patterson, Marc Pfafflin – Pro Tools
- Angela Lockhart – creative direction
- Victoria Jordan – design
- Justin Jay – photography

== Charts ==
=== Weekly charts ===
Chart (2001)	Peak position
Austrian Albums (Ö3 Austria)	42
Belgian Albums (Ultratop Flanders)	43
Belgian Albums (Ultratop Wallonia)	30
Dutch Albums (Album Top 100)	85
French Albums (SNEP)	52
German Albums (Offizielle Top 100)	14
Swiss Albums (Schweizer Hitparade)	43
UK Albums (Official Charts)	89
US Billboard 200	2
US Top R&B/Hip-Hop Albums (Billboard)	1

=== Year-end charts ===
Chart (2001)	Position
US Billboard 200	103
US Top R&B/Hip-Hop Albums (Billboard)	45

== Certifications ==
Region	Certification	Certified units/sales
Canada (Music Canada)	Gold	50,000^{^}
United Kingdom (BPI)	Silver	60,000^{*}
^{*} Sales figures based on certification alone.^{^} Shipments figures based on certification alone.
