= Cheri Dennis =

American R&B singer from Cleveland, Ohio

- Born: August 12, 1979 (age 47); Cleveland, Ohio, United States
- Genre: R&B
- Occupation: Singer-songwriter
- Years active: 1999–present
- Label: Bad Boy/Atlantic

Cheri Dennis (born August 12, 1979), is an American R&B singer from Cleveland, Ohio.

== Early life ==
Cheri Dennis was born and raised in Cleveland, Ohio and was initially a member of a girl group named Spoyled. When the group broke up, Dennis left Shaker Heights and moved to New York where she began her recording career.

== Career ==
Dennis first appeared on the Mase tracks "No Matter What", "All I Ever Wanted" and "If You Want to Party" from his album Double Up (1999), after running into Diddy during a party in New York City. After appearing briefly on Puff Daddy's Forever album ("Is This the End? (Pt. 2)") also in 1999, in 2001 she reappeared signed to Bad Boy Entertainment with her first solo track "So Complete" from the P. Diddy and The Bad Boy Family album "The Saga Continues...". Afterwards she was heard on several mixtapes, before finally releasing her first single, the Ryan Leslie produced track "I Love You", in fall 2005. The music video was filmed in March 2006 before premiering on BET's 106 & Park on May 1. "I Love You" peaked at No. 38 on Billboard's Hot R&B/Hip-Hop Singles & Tracks. Dennis' second single "Portrait of Love" peaked at No. 55 before her debut album In and Out of Love finally released in February 2008, debuting at No. 74 on the Billboard 200. Her song "Ooh La La" was originally used as an opener for Making The Band 3, which suggested that the final band recorded the song. The girls often referred to the song in competitions.

She now goes by Cheri Coke and has collaborated with MeLo-X on "The Garden of Eden", it is a part of the tracklist that will appear on Dennis's second album "X/COKE".

== Discography ==
Studio albums

- In and Out of Love (2007)
- X/COKE (2020)

=== Guest appearances ===
Year	Artist	Album	Title (s)	Notes
1999	Mase	Double Up	"If You Want To Party", "All I Ever Wanted", "No Matter What"	
1999	Puff Daddy	Forever	"Is This The End (Pt. 2)"	
2001	Faith Evans	Faithfully	"Faithful (Interlude)"	Co-writer
2001	P. Diddy & The Bad Boy Family	The Saga Continues...	"Incomplete (Interlude)", "So Complete", "Back For Good Now"	
2001	Olivia	Olivia	"Look Around"	Co-writer
2005	The Notorious B.I.G.	Duets: The Final Chapter	"Living The Life", "Spit Your Game"	
2005	Black Rob	The Black Rob Report	"B.R."	
2006	Danity Kane	Danity Kane	"Back Up"	Co-Writer, Originally recorded by Cheri Dennis
2006	Yung Joc	New Joc City	"Flip Flop	
2006	Diddy	Press Play	Outro to "Diddy Rock"	
2010	Machine Gun Kelly	Lace Up!	"See My Tears"	
