= Harve Pierre =

American record executive

- Also known as: Joe Hooker
- Origin: Brooklyn, New York City, U.S.
- Genres: R&B; hip hop
- Occupation: Record executive
- Years active: 1991–present
- Label: Bad Boy

Harve Pierre, also known by the stage name Joe Hooker, is an American record executive. He is best known for his work with Puff Daddy's Bad Boy Records.

Pierre was born in New York City to Haitian parents. He was the first staffer of Bad Boy Records upon its launch in 1993, and promptly left Uptown Records to join the label following Puff Daddy's departure. Serving as its A&R director, he oversaw many of the label's projects until his brief departure in 1995 in favor of an executive position at RCA Records. He returned to Bad Boy two years later, and was named the label's president by 2008 until leaving the post in 2017.

In 2023, following the controversies regarding the label's founder, Pierre was sued for sexual assault in November of that year.

== Guest appearances ==
YEAR	ALBUM	ARTIST	CREDIT
1999	Life Story	Black Rob	"You Don't Know Me"
1999	Life Story	Black Rob	"I Dare You"
1999	Life Story	Black Rob	"B.R." with G-Dep
1999	Born Again	The Notorious B.I.G.	"Tonight" with Mobb Deep
1999	Born Again	The Notorious B.I.G.	"Born Again"
1999	The Wonderful World of Cease-a-Leo	Lil' Cease	"Future Sport" with Redman
1999	The Wonderful World of Cease-a-Leo	Lil' Cease	"Play Around" with Lil' Kim
1999	Double Up	Mase	"Blood Is Thicker"
1999	Forever	Puff Daddy	"Journey Through the Life" with Nas, Lil' Kim and Beanie Sigel
2001	Child of the Ghetto	G-Dep	"I Want the World to See"
2001	Child of the Ghetto	G-Dep	"Nothing's Gonna Stop Me"
2003	Loon	Loon	"Can't Talk to Her" with P.Diddy
2003	He's Keith Murray	Keith Murray	"The Carnage"

== Production ==
YEAR	ALBUM	ARTIST	CREDIT
1999	Greatest Hits	Sisters With Voices	Composer
2007	Hood Figga	Gorilla Zoe	Executive Producer
2007	Just Watch Me	Jordan McCoy	Executive Producer
1994	Project: Funk da World	Craig Mack	A&R
1994	Project: Funk da World	Craig Mack	A&R
1994	Ready to Die	The Notorious B.I.G	A&R
1994	Ready to Die: The Remaster	The Notorious B.I.G	Associate Executive Producer
1994	Ready to Die: The Remaster [2006]	The Notorious B.I.G	Executive Producer, Associate executive producer
1994	Ready to Die: The Remaster [2006] [Clean]	The Notorious B.I.G	Associate executive producer
1995	Faith	Faith Evans	A&R
1995	I will Survive (Doin' it My Way)	Chantay Savage	Producer
1995	Natural	Mic Geronimo	Remixing
1996	Total	Total	A&R
1996	New Beginning	SWV	A&R
1997	Someone [CD]	SWV	Associate executive producer
1997	Release Some Tension	SWV	Associate executive producer, Vocal Arrangement, Arranger, A&R
1998	Come with Me [import]	Diddy	A&R
1998	Bad Boy's Greatest Hits	Various Artists	Associate Executive Producer, A&R
1998	Bad Boy's Greatest Hits [Clean]	Various Artists	A&R, Associate Executive Producer, Producer
1998	Slam	Original Soundtrack	Composer
1998	Room 112	112	A&R, Associate executive producer
1998	Keep the Faith	Faith Evans	A&R
1998	Kima, Keisha, & Pam	Total	Producer, A&R, Associate Executive producer, Vocal Producer
1998	Kima, Keisha, & Pam [Clean]	Total	Producer, A&R, Associate Executive producer, Vocal Producer
1999	Double Up	Mase	A&R, Associate Executive Producer, Composer
1999	Wonderful World of Cease A Leo	Lil' Cease	Composer
1999	Forever	Diddy	Associate Executive producer, A&R, Composer
1999	Forever [Clean]	Diddy	Associate Executive producer, A&R, Composer
1999	Life Story	Black Rob	A&R, Vocal Producer, Executive producer, Vocals, Producer
1999	Life Story	Black Rob	Programming, Vocals, Vocal Producer, Executive producer, Programming, A&R, Composer, Producer
1999	Born Again	The Notorious B.I.G	Associate executive producer, A&R, Producer, Composer
1999	Born Again	The Notorious B.I.G [Clean]	Associate executive producer, A&R, Producer, Composer
2000	Black and White [Clean]	Original Soundtrack	Arranger
2000	Emotional	Carl Thomas	A&R, Producer, Vocal Producer, Associate executive producer, Composer
2000	Bad Boy's R&B Hits [CD& DVD]	Various Artists	Associate executive producer, executive producer
2000	Shyne	Shyne	A&R, Associate executive producer
2000	#1 Stunna [Mixin' Up S**t]	Mr. Quikk	Composer
2001	Part III	112	Associate executive producer, A&R
2001	The Saga Continues	Diddy	A&R, Associate Executive Producer, Vocal Producer
2001	Thank You [Unreleased]	Diddy	A&R, Associate Executive producer
2001	Best of SWV	SWV	Composer
2001	Faithfully	Faith Evans	Vocal Producer, Associate producer
2001	Heavy Hits Mixed by DJ Enuff	DJ Enuff	Vocals, Vocal Producer
2001	Child of the Ghetto	G. Dep	Producer, Composer, Mixing, A&R, executive producer, Vocal producer
2002	We Invented the Remix	Diddy	Composer, A&R, Associate executive producer
2002	We Invented the Remix [Clean]	Diddy	Composer, A&R, Associate executive producer
2003	Yeah Yeah U Know It/Fatty Girl/ Special Delivery [US CD 5]	Keith Murray	Composer
2003	Too hot for TV	Da Band	Multi Instruments, Vocal producer, executive producer, producer, strings, A&R
2003	Too hot for TV [Clean]	Da Band	Multi Instruments, Vocal producer, executive producer, producer, strings, A&R
2004	Lets Talk About It	Carl Thomas	Associate executive producer, Vocal Producer, Composer, A&R
2004	Bad Boy's 10th Anniversary: The Hits	Various Artists	Composer
2004	Hurt No More	Mario Winans	Associate executive producer, A&R,
2004	Hurt No More [Clean]	Mario Winans	Associate executive producer, A&R,
2004	Living Legends	8ball & MJG	Associate executive producer
2004	Living Legends [Chopped and Screwed]	8-Ball & MJG	Associate executive producer
2004	Living Legends [Clean]	8-Ball & MJG	Associate executive producer
2004	Best of Junior M.A.F.I.A	Junior M.A.F.I.A	Composer
2004	Welcome Back	MASE	Executive producer
2004	One Love	New Edition	associate executive producer
2005	Boyz n da Hood	Boyz n da Hood	Executive producer
2005	Boyz n da Hood [clean]	Boyz n da Hood	Executive producer
2005	B5	B5	Executive producer
2005	Black Rob Report	Black Rob Report	Vocals, Producer, Vocal Producer, executive producer, executive producer
2005	Duets: The Final Chapter	Notorious B.I.G	Producer, A&R, executive producer
2006	Ride for You	Danity Kane	Executive producer
2006	New Joc City	Young Joc	Executive producer
2006	New Joc City [Clean]	Young Joc	Executive producer
2006	Cassie	Cassie	Executive producer
2006	Danity Kane	Danity Kane	Executive producers
2006	Christian Daniel	Christian Daniel	Executive producer
2006	Long Way 2 Go	Cassie	Executive producer
2006	Now, Vol. 65 [UK 45 Tracks]	Various Artists	Producer
2006	1st time/ I'm Him	Yung Joc	executive producer
2007	Hydrolics featuring Bow Wow	B5	Executive producer
2007	Portrait of Love	Cheri Dennis	Executive producer
2007	Ridin' High	8-Ball & MJG	Executive producer
2007	Ridin' High [Clean]	8ball & MJG	Executive producer
2007	Clap On	8-Ball & MJG	Executive producer
2007	Five-O	Elephant man	Executive producer
2007	Coffee Shop	Yung Joc	Executive producer
2007	Bottle Poppin'	Yung Joc	Executive Producer
2008	Take You There	Donnie Klang	Executive producer
2008	In and Out of Love	Cherri Dennis	Audio production, Composer
2008	In and Out of Love [Bonus Track]	Cherri Dennis	Audio production, Composer
2008	Welcome to the Dollhouse	Danity Kane	Composer
2008	Lets Get Physical	Elephant man	Executive producer
2009	Don't Feed da Animals	Gorilla Zoe	Audio Production
2009	Forever in a Day	Day 26	composer
2010	Last Train to Paris	Diddy	Executive producer

== Writing ==
- 1997: SWV - "Someone" | Release Some Tension
- 1998: Total - "If You Want Me" | Kima, Keisha, and Pam
- 1999: Black Rob - "Whoa!", "Life Story, " | Life Story
- 2001: P. Diddy & The Bad Boy Family - "That's Crazy" | The Saga Continues...
- 2003: Loon - "How You Want That", "Things You Do", "Down For Me" | Loon

== Vocal production ==
YEAR	ALBUM	ARTIST	CREDIT
1997	SWV	SWV	"When You Cry"
1997	SWV	SWV	"Release Some Tension"
1998	Kima, Keisha and Pam	Total	"Press Rewind"
1998	Kima, Keisha and Pam	Total	"Sitting Home"
1998	Kima, Keisha and Pam	Total	"Rain"
2000	Carl Thomas	Carl Thomas	"Woke Up In The Morning"
2000	Carl Thomas	Carl Thomas	"Emotional"
2001	Faithfully	Faith Evans	"Intro I'm Back"
2001	Child Of The Ghetto	G-Dep	"Child Of The Ghetto"
2001	Sean Combs P.Diddy & The Bad Boy Family	P.Diddy	"The Saga Continues…"
2003	Bad Boy 2	Loon	"Relax Your Mind"
2003	Bad Boy 2	Loon	"Bad Boy 2"
