= Bad Boy Records =

American record label

Bad Boy Entertainment
- Parent company: BMG Music (1993–2002); Universal Music Group (2003–2005)
- Founded: 1993 (33 years ago)
- Founder: Sean "Puffy" Combs
- Status: Active
- Distributors: Epic (2015–2022); Interscope (2009–2015); Atlantic (2005–2009); Rhino (2005 – present; back catalog only); Universal (2003–2005); Arista (1993–2002)
- Genre: East Coast hip-hop; R&B
- Country of origin: United States
- Location: New York City, U.S.

Bad Boy Entertainment, doing business as Bad Boy Records, is an American record label founded by rapper and record producer Sean Combs. The first signee, Craig Mack, gained significant commercial success after the release of his 1994 single "Flava In Ya Ear". The label then signed other hip-hop and R&B acts, including the Notorious B.I.G., Faith Evans, Mase, 112, Total, the Lox, Shyne, and Carl Thomas. At its peak in 1997, Bad Boy was worth an estimated $100 million. During the 2000s, Bad Boy Records signed several notable artists, including French Montana, Machine Gun Kelly, Janelle Monáe, and Cassie Ventura.

In 2022, Combs founded a successor label, Love Records, to self-release his fifth studio album, The Love Album: Off the Grid, in September of that year.

== History ==
=== Beginnings ===
Sean Combs founded Bad Boy Entertainment in 1993 after rising from an unpaid internship to an artists and repertoire (A&R) executive at Uptown Records, where he was fired in 1993 by Andre Harrell. Combs took the role of chief executive officer, while former Orion Pictures marketing manager Kirk Burrowes was named general manager and given a 25 percent stake in the label. During this period, Burrowes managed the company’s internal business affairs and operational structure.

Combs brought the Notorious B.I.G., who became the label's flagship artist, to the company. With leverage from his success at Uptown, Combs negotiated a $10-15 million deal with BMG Music's Arista Records, under the then leadership of Clive Davis. The label's first release was "Flava in Ya Ear" by Craig Mack in July 1994. It was followed by "Juicy", the lead single from the Notorious B.I.G.'s debut album Ready to Die, which was released on September 13, 1994, and a week later by Mack's debut album, Project: Funk da World, on September 20. Mack's album went Gold and Ready to Die multi-platinum. Dominating the charts in 1995, the Notorious B.I.G. became one of the genre's biggest names and Bad Boy's premier star. Also in 1995, the label had platinum releases by Total and Faith Evans. It had a bevy of in-house writer/producers, including Easy Mo Bee, Chucky Thompson, and D-Dot—each of whom is credited on a bulk of Bad Boy's releases during this time.

=== Feud with Death Row Records and murder of the Notorious B.I.G. ===
The rapid success of Bad Boy and the Notorious B.I.G. raised some tension, especially with the Los Angeles-based Death Row Records. For three years leading up to 1995, West Coast hip-hop, dominated by labels such as Death Row, had been preeminent in mainstream rap. Death Row CEO Suge Knight held Combs responsible for the shooting death of his friend Jake Robles, allegedly at the hands of Combs's bodyguard Anthony "Wolf" Jones. The tension heightened when Death Row signed Tupac Shakur, who alleged that Bad Boy, notably the Notorious B.I.G. and Combs, had been complicit in his November 1994 shooting at Quad Recording Studios in Times Square, New York.

After the June 1996 release of 2Pac's "Hit 'Em Up", smearing Bad Boy, tensions escalated. Shakur was shot in Las Vegas, Nevada, on September 7 and died on September 13. Bad Boy issued a statement of condolences. On March 9, 1997, while Bad Boy was preparing the release of the Notorious B.I.G.'s double album Life After Death, he was killed in Los Angeles, California. Their deaths left many to speculate that the coastal hostility had been responsible for their deaths. The police investigations were criticized by public and judicial sources. Both cases remain officially unsolved.

=== Life after the Notorious B.I.G. and rebuilding the label ===
Posthumously, Biggie's Life After Death reached number one on the Billboard 200 chart. Its first two singles, "Hypnotize" and "Mo Money, Mo Problems" also topped the singles charts. The album is one of the highest-selling rap albums ever in the U.S., selling over 10 million copies.

In 1996, Combs began recording his solo debut album. The first single, "Can't Nobody Hold Me Down", peaked at number one on the hip-hop, R&B, and pop charts the following spring, in early 1997. In response to the Notorious B.I.G.'s death, the label rush-released Combs's tribute song, "I'll Be Missing You", which features Biggie's widow, Faith Evans, and Bad Boy's R&B group 112. The single topped the charts for 11 weeks and became the second single from Combs's album, No Way Out, which was released in July 1997. The album debuted at number one on the Billboard 200 chart with over 560,000 copies sold in its first week, and seven million altogether. It features appearances by Mase, the Lox, and Carl Thomas, and introduced Bad Boy signee Black Rob.

Mase, Combs's newest protégé, was thrust into the void the Notorious B.I.G. left. His debut album, Harlem World (1997), went quadruple platinum. Due to the successes of Life After Death, No Way Out, and Harlem World, by the end of 1997 Bad Boy as a label and brand name had hit a commercial peak. It began to promote its latest signing, the hip-hop group the Lox, which had prominently featured on various Bad Boy releases that year.

Bad Boy found success with the Lox. In January 1998, it released the group's debut album, Money, Power & Respect, to commercial success. It debuted within the top three on the Billboard 200 chart and was certified platinum. The album was executive produced by Combs and Deric "D-Dot" Angelettie, and features guest appearances by Combs and Carl Thomas. That year, Combs expanded Bad Boy's roster to genres other than hip-hop and R&B, signing Fuzzbubble as its first rock act. The group appeared on the rock remix of Puff Daddy's "It's All About the Benjamins" but parted ways with the label before releasing a full-length album.

In the following years, Bad Boy declined commercially. In 1999, Mase became religious and abruptly retired from the business, leaving a serious dent in the company, especially since his second album had just been released. Bad Boy found some success with Shyne, a young rapper from Brooklyn, who received generally mixed reviews for his deep voice and slow flow—which many considered too reminiscent, and perhaps a ripoff, of the Notorious B.I.G. Combs's later albums failed to generate the same acclaim his debut had.

In an attempt to further market himself, he underwent several name changes, from "Puff Daddy" to "Puffy" to "P. Diddy" to "Diddy" to "Diddy- Dirty Money". But with the split of the group, he returned to "Diddy".

In June 1999, it was reported that Clive Davis and Arista had given Combs a $50 million advance on future earnings in 1998, but Bad Boy only generated around $30 million in 1999.

In the early 2000s, Bad Boy noticeably floundered. Many of its more popular acts left, while those that stayed saw their album sales dwindle. Despite continually releasing new material and various attempts to build artists of the status of the Notorious B.I.G., few proved as successful as the company hoped. Bad Boy had success in 2000 with Black Rob, a New York City rapper who began associating with Bad Boy in 1996. His album Life Story was released through Bad Boy on March 27, 2000, debuted in the top three on the Billboard 200, and was certified platinum.

On June 20, 2002, it was confirmed that Combs and Bad Boy had parted ways with Arista. Combs walked away with ownership of Bad Boy's catalogue and recording roster. Around this time, Combs began overseeing the MTV's Making The Band 2, a reality music show about the development of a group act. Making the Band 2's three seasons focused on Combs's new group, Bad Boy's Da Band.

In January 2003, Combs and Bad Boy entered talks with The Warner Music Group's Elektra Records about Elektra possibly housing Bad Boy for a reported $10 million, but the deal fell through. On February 6, 2003, it was confirmed that Bad Boy had signed a distribution deal with Universal Records, under the leadership of Monte Lipman. Under its terms, Combs retained 100% of the company and Universal would handle distribution and provide marketing and promotional support. In September 2003, Bad Boy's Da Band released its debut studio album, Too Hot for TV. The group's exposure on MTV helped the album secure a gold certification by the RIAA.

Southern rap duo 8Ball & MJG released an album called Living Legends to some success in 2004, prompting the creation of Bad Boy South, which eventually housed acts such as Yung Joc. The label also signed the rapper Aasim, whose Bad Boy debut album has never been released.

By January 2005, Bad Boy began clashing with Universal Records. It is alleged that the tension between the labels stemmed from Combs's belief that Universal had not done enough to market Bad Boy's music, while Universal refused to offer more money until Bad Boy produced more hit records. Though Bad Boy's contract with Universal was set to expire in 2006, Combs began talking to other record labels, in particular The Warner Music Group and Sony Music's Columbia Records, for distribution.

=== Resurgence ===
In 2005, the company formed a joint venture with Warner Music Group (WMG). This saw WMG become the worldwide distributor of the company’s back catalog of classic hits, and take 50% equity in Bad Boy Entertainment. Combs, however, retained joint control over the label and could buy back his equity stake at a later date.

Bad Boy would also see its fortunes improve in 2005, with the success of releases from new signees: Cassie and Yung Joc (both of whom would score top-five singles/debut albums). Also in 2006, Bad Boy hit pay dirt with Making the Band 3's Danity Kane, whose debut album topped the charts at number one (the label's first chart-topping album since the Bad Boys II soundtrack three years prior), and spun off a top-five singles. Its second album, Welcome to the Dollhouse, also debuted at number one, and contained the group's second top-ten single, "Damaged". Diddy also signed Day26 and Donnie Klang to the label.

By 2009, Combs dissolved Danity Kane, terminating Aubrey O'Day's, D. Woods's, Shannon Bex's and Aundrea Fimbres's contracts. Dawn Richard remained a Bad Boy solo artist and songwriter. In March 2009, it was reported that Richard and Combs were assembling a new girl group but later formed Diddy – Dirty Money, composed of Combs, Richard, and the singer-songwriter Kalenna Harper. In April 2009, Bad Boy signed Red Cafe.

In September 2009, it was announced that Combs would leave WMG, inking a new deal with Universal's Interscope Records. Under the terms of the deal, Combs rebooted the Bad Boy name and trademark, to be operated by Interscope, while the previous Bad Boy catalog and roster remained under Warner's control.

=== 2010–present ===
In 2010, Combs offered Mase a one-year release from Bad Boy to settle their differences after the 2009 incident with Mase wanting to be released from Bad Boy. With this, Mase decided to retire from rap for good, although he was to be reassigned to Bad Boy after his year break was done.

In 2011, under his new deal with Interscope-Geffen-A&M, Combs stated he was looking for new talent to add to his new Bad Boy roster. Jay Electronica, who had close ties with Combs, was originally planned to be signed to the label, but had signed with Jay-Z's Roc Nation imprint instead. Machine Gun Kelly announced that he signed to Bad Boy/Interscope on August 3, 2011. French Montana and Los also were announced as signees to the label in 2012.

On April 25, 2012, Mase featured alongside Combs on Wale's "Slight Work" remix, marking the first appearance of the Harlem rapper on record since 2010. Rumors began to start that Mase, as well as singer Omarion, were both signing to Rick Ross's Maybach Music Group. It was later revealed that Bad Boy artist French Montana was the reason Mase was making his third comeback. According to Montana, Mase was to serve an A&R role on Montana's major-label debut studio album, Excuse My French, as well as appearing on the remix of Montana's "Everything's a Go". Upon the album's release, Mase was not credited on the project. "I'm not sure what kind of decisions he's going to make," Montana said, "[but] I would love to see him in my camp." Mase briefly resigned to Bad Boy Records during this period, but left the label once again without any releases.

In April 2013, Cassie released her first full-length project seven years after her debut album, a mixtape titled RockaByeBaby, to positive reception. Rapper Los announced his departure from Bad Boy Records on March 19, 2014.

On October 5, 2015, Combs announced that Bad Boy would be distributed by Epic Records. This will mark the second time that Epic president L.A. Reid oversaw distribution for Bad Boy, having previously overseen distribution for the label fifteen years earlier after being appointed president of Arista in 2000. Despite founding the label in 1993, Bad Boy began celebrating its twentieth anniversary in 2015 with a twenty-minute mega-medley performance at the BET Awards. It stretched into 2016, starting with the label's May reunion sold-out shows at the Barclays Center in Brooklyn, and originating the Bad Boy Family Reunion Tour, starting in North America in the last week of August 2016.

== Roster ==
=== Current ===
Act	Year signed	Releases under Bad Boy
Sean Combs	Founder (1993)	5
King Combs	2016	2

=== Former ===
- Craig Mack (deceased) (1993–1996)
- The Notorious B.I.G. (deceased) (1993–1997)
- Faith Evans (1994–2004)
- Total (1994–2000)
- 112 (1995–2005)
- Mase (1996–2010)
- Tanya Trotter (1996–2000)
- Mario Winans (2001–2008)
- The Lox (1996–1999)
- Styles (1996–1999)
- Jadakiss (1996–1999)
- Black Rob (deceased) (1996–2010)
- Carl Thomas (1997–2005)
- Shyne (1998–2001)
- Mark Curry (2000–2002)
- Dream (2000–2004)
- G. Dep (1999–2005)
- Loon (2001–2006)
- Da Band (2002–2004)
- Fuzzbubble
- 8Ball & MJG (2002–2008)
- Foxy Brown (2002–2004)
- Boyz n da Hood (2004–2008)
- Cheri Dennis (2000–2009)
- Kalenna Harper
- New Edition (2003–2006)
- Red Café (2011–2014)
- B5 (2004–2008)
- Yung Joc (2004–2009)
- Dirty Money (2009–2012)
- Gorilla Zoe
- Danity Kane
- King Los (2012–2014)
- Day26
- Elephant Man (2006–2009)
- Donnie Klang (2006–2008)
- Cassie (2006–2021)
- Pitbull (2006–2007)
- Christian Daniel
- Machine Gun Kelly (2011–2024)
- Janelle Monáe (2008–2025)
- French Montana (2012–2022)
- Quincy (2016)

== The Hitmen ==
The Hitmen
- Genre: Hip-hop
- Years active: 1993–present
- Label: Bad Boy
- Members: Ryan Leslie; Sean "Diddy" Combs; Kanye West; Mario "Yellowman" Winans; Deric "D-Dot" Angelettie; Ron "Amen-Ra" Lawrence; Rashad Smith; Richard "Younglord" Frierson; Daven "Prestige" Vanderpool; Carlos "Six July" Broady; Delano "Sean C" Matthews; Levar "LV" Coppin; Harve "Joe Hooker" Pierre; Tony Dofat; Craig "Klepto" Tucker; Stevie J; Yogi; Jeffrey "J-Dub" Walker; Nashiem Myrick
- Past members: Andraeo "Fanatic" Heard; Anthony Dent; Jack Knight; Easy Mo Bee; Kelly Price; Rob Holladay; Chucky Thompson (deceased); Andre Ashford; Jesse West; Craig Klepto Tucker; EZ Elpee; Kory Harper; Eric "Coptic" Matlock; Funk’e Ray; Prince Charles Alexander

The Hitmen is the production team for Bad Boy Records. The collective consisted of several notable producers and musicians that either worked solo or alongside Combs in composing tracks for the artists on Bad Boy as well as outside the label.

On August 20, 2015, it was announced that Kanye West was part of the Hitmen's roster.

== Discography ==
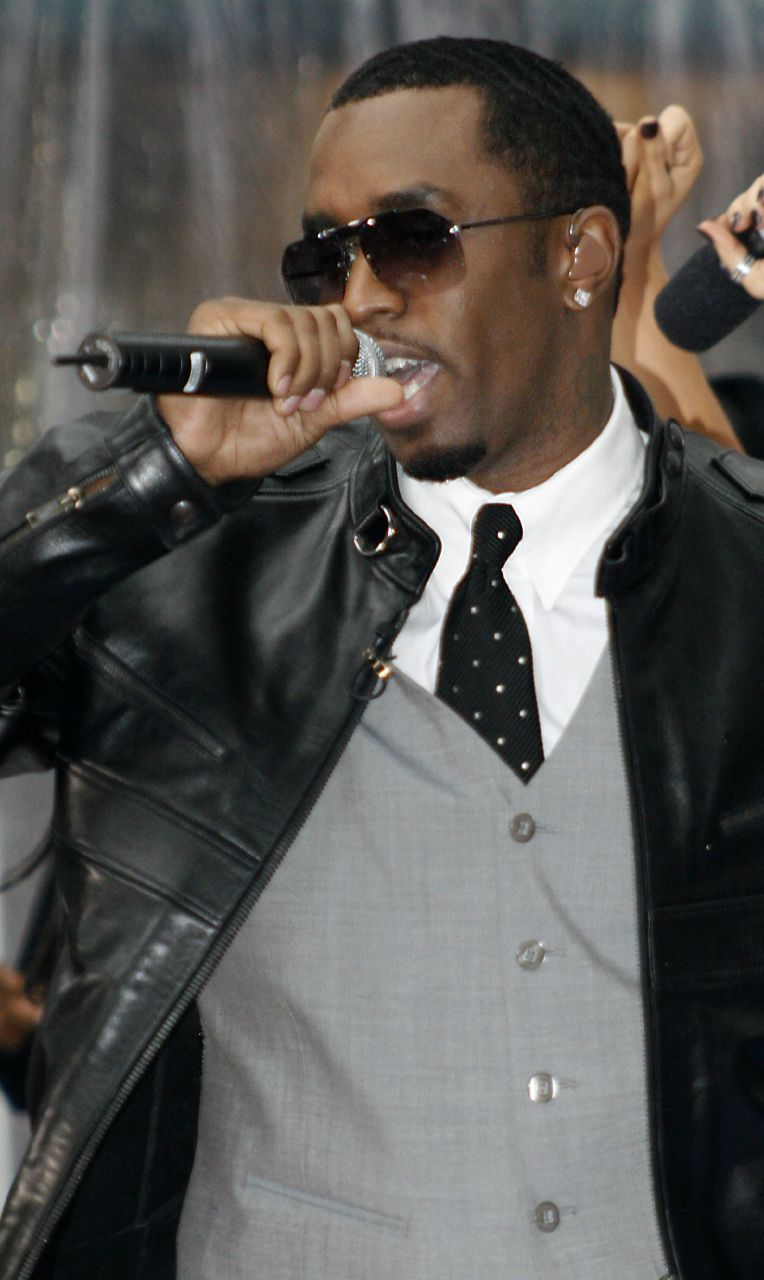
Sean Combs was signed to the label in 1994 and has released 5 albums from it

=== Albums ===
Year	Information
1994	The Notorious B.I.G. - Ready to Die: Released: September 13, 1994; RIAA certification: 6× Platinum; Chart positions: No.15 Billboard
1994	Craig Mack - Project: Funk da World: Released: September 20, 1994; RIAA certification: Gold; Chart positions: No.21 Billboard
1995	Faith Evans - Faith: Released: August 29, 1995; RIAA certification: Platinum; Chart positions: No.22 Billboard
1996	Total - Total: Released: January 30, 1996; RIAA certification: Platinum; Chart positions: No.23 Billboard
1996	112 - 112: Released: August 27, 1996; RIAA certification: 2× Platinum; Chart positions: No.37 Billboard
1997	The Notorious B.I.G. - Life After Death: Released: March 25, 1997; RIAA certification: Diamond (11× Platinum); Chart positions: No.1 Billboard
1997	Puff Daddy & the Family - No Way Out: Released: July 22, 1997; RIAA certification: 7× Platinum; Chart positions: No.1 Billboard
1997	Mase - Harlem World: Released: October 28, 1997; RIAA certification: 4× Platinum; Chart positions: No.1 Billboard
1998	The LOX - Money, Power & Respect: Released: January 28, 1998; RIAA certification: Platinum; Chart positions: No.3 Billboard
1998	Faith Evans - Keep the Faith: Released: October 27, 1998; RIAA certification: Platinum; Chart positions: No.6 Billboard
1998	Total - Kima, Keisha, and Pam: Released: November 3, 1998; RIAA certification: Gold; Chart positions: No.39 Billboard
1998	112 - Room 112: Released: November 10, 1998; RIAA certification: 2× Platinum; Chart positions: No.20 Billboard
1999	Mase - Double Up: Released: June 15, 1999; RIAA certification: Gold; Chart positions: No.11 Billboard
1999	Puff Daddy - Forever: Released: August 24, 1999; RIAA certification: Platinum; Chart positions: No.2 Billboard
1999	The Notorious B.I.G. - Born Again: Released: December 7, 1999; RIAA certification: 2× Platinum; Chart positions: No.1 Billboard
2000	Black Rob - Life Story: Released: March 7, 2000; RIAA certification: Platinum; Chart positions: No.3 Billboard
2000	Carl Thomas - Emotional: Released: April 18, 2000; RIAA certification: Platinum; Chart positions: No.9 Billboard
2000	Shyne - Shyne: Released: September 26, 2000; RIAA certification: Platinum; Chart positions: No.5 Billboard
2001	Dream - It Was All a Dream: Released: January 23, 2001; RIAA certification: Platinum; Chart positions: No.6 Billboard
2001	112 - Part III: Released: March 20, 2001; RIAA certification: Platinum; Chart positions: No.2 Billboard
2001	P. Diddy & The Bad Boy Family - The Saga Continues...: Released: July 10, 2001; Chart positions: No.2 Billboard
2001	Faith Evans - Faithfully: Released: November 6, 2001; RIAA certification: Platinum; Chart positions: No.14 Billboard
2001	G. Dep - Child of the Ghetto: Released: November 20, 2001; Chart positions: No.106 Billboard
2002	P. Diddy & the Bad Boy Family - We Invented the Remix: Released: May 14, 2002; RIAA certification: Platinum; Chart positions: No.1 Billboard
2003	Bad Boys II: The Soundtrack: Released: July 15, 2003; RIAA certification: 2× Platinum; Chart positions: No.1 Billboard
2003	Da Band - Too Hot for TV: Released: September 30, 2003; RIAA certification: Gold; Chart positions: No.2 Billboard
2003	Loon - Loon: Released: October 21, 2003; Chart positions: No.6 Billboard
2003	112 - Hot & Wet: Released: November 18, 2003; Chart positions: No.22 Billboard
2004	Carl Thomas - Let's Talk About It: Released: March 23, 2004; RIAA certification: Gold; Chart positions: No.4 Billboard
2004	Mario Winans - Hurt No More: Released: April 20, 2004; RIAA certification: Gold; Chart positions: No.2 Billboard
2004	8Ball & MJG - Living Legends: Released: May 11, 2004; RIAA certification: Gold; Chart positions: No.3 Billboard
2004	Mase - Welcome Back: Released: August 24, 2004; RIAA certification: Gold; Chart positions: No.4 Billboard
2004	New Edition - One Love: Released: November 9, 2004; RIAA certification: Gold; Chart positions: No.12 Billboard
2005	Boyz n da Hood - Boyz n da Hood: Released: June 21, 2005; Chart positions: No.5 Billboard
2005	B5 - B5: Released: July 19, 2005; Chart positions: No.19 Billboard
2005	Black Rob - The Black Rob Report: Released: July 19, 2005; Chart positions: No.40 Billboard
2005	The Notorious B.I.G. - Duets: The Final Chapter: Released: December 20, 2005; RIAA certification: Platinum; Chart positions: No.3 Billboard
2006	Yung Joc - New Joc City: Released: June 6, 2006; RIAA certification: Platinum; Chart positions: No.3 Billboard
2006	Cassie - Cassie: Released: August 8, 2006; RIAA certification: Platinum; Chart positions: No.4 Billboard
2006	Danity Kane - Danity Kane: Released: August 22, 2006; RIAA certification:2× Platinum; Chart positions: No.1 Billboard
2006	Diddy - Press Play: Released: October 17, 2006; RIAA certification: Gold; Chart positions: No.1 Billboard
2007	The Notorious B.I.G. - Greatest Hits: Released: March 6, 2007; RIAA certification: Platinum; Chart positions: No.1 Billboard
2007	8Ball & MJG - Ridin High: Released: March 13, 2007; Chart positions: No.8 Billboard
2007	Yung Joc - Hustlenomics: Released: August 28, 2007; Chart positions: No.3 Billboard
2007	B5 - Don't Talk, Just Listen: Released: September 11, 2007; Chart positions: No.27 Billboard
2007	Gorilla Zoe - Welcome to the Zoo: Released: September 25, 2007; Chart positions: No.18 Billboard
2007	Boyz n da Hood - Back Up n da Chevy: Released: October 2, 2007; Chart positions: No.51 Billboard
2008	Cheri Dennis - In and Out of Love: Released: February 26, 2008; Chart positions: No.74 Billboard
2008	Danity Kane - Welcome to the Dollhouse: Released: March 18, 2008; RIAA certification: Platinum; Chart positions: No.1 Billboard
2008	Day26 - Day26: Released: March 25, 2008; Chart positions: No.1 Billboard
2008	Elephant Man - Let's Get Physical: Released: April 8, 2008
2008	Donnie Klang - Just a Rolling Stone: Released: September 2, 2008; Chart positions: No.19 Billboard
2009	Notorious: The Soundtrack: Released: January 13, 2009; Chart positions: No.4 Billboard
2009	Gorilla Zoe - Don't Feed da Animals: Released: March 17, 2009; Chart positions: No.8 Billboard
2009	Day26 - Forever in a Day: Released: April 14, 2009; Chart positions: No.2 Billboard
2010	Diddy – Dirty Money - Last Train to Paris: Released: December 14, 2010; Chart positions: No.7 Billboard
2011	Gorilla Zoe - King Kong: Released: June 14, 2011; Chart positions: No.56 Billboard
2012	Machine Gun Kelly - Lace Up: Released: October 9, 2012; RIAA certification: Gold; Chart positions: No.4 Billboard
2013	French Montana - Excuse My French: Released: May 21, 2013; RIAA certification: Gold; Chart positions: No.4 Billboard
2013	Janelle Monáe - The Electric Lady: Released: September 10, 2013; Chart positions: No.5 Billboard
2015	Machine Gun Kelly - General Admission: Released: October 16, 2015; RIAA certification: Gold; Chart positions: No.4 Billboard
2015	Puff Daddy - MMM: Released: December 18, 2015; Chart positions: No.45 Billboard R&B
2017	Machine Gun Kelly - bloom: Released: May 12, 2017; RIAA certification: Gold; Chart positions: No.8 Billboard
2017	French Montana - Jungle Rules: Released: July 14, 2017; RIAA Certification: Gold; Chart positions: No.3 Billboard
2018	Janelle Monáe - Dirty Computer: Released: April 27, 2018; Chart positions: No.6 Billboard
2019	French Montana - Montana: Released: December 6, 2019; RIAA certification: Gold; Chart positions: No.25 Billboard
2020	Machine Gun Kelly - Tickets to My Downfall: Released: September 25, 2020; RIAA certification: Platinum; Chart positions: No.1 Billboard
2021	French Montana - They Got Amnesia: Released: November 19, 2021; Chart positions: No.59 Billboard
2022	Machine Gun Kelly - Mainstream Sellout: Released: March 25, 2022; Chart positions: No.1 Billboard
2023	Janelle Monáe - The Age of Pleasure: Released: June 9, 2023; Chart positions: No.17 Billboard

=== Label compilations ===
Year	Information
1998	Bad Boy Greatest Hits: Volume 1: Released: October 13, 1998; Singles: "Too Too Old For Me" by Jerome; RIAA certification: Gold
2002	P. Diddy & Bad Boy Records Present... We Invented the Remix: Released: May 14, 2002; Singles: "I Need a Girl (Part One)", "I Need a Girl (Part Two)", "Special Delivery (Remix)"; RIAA certification: 2× Platinum
2004	Bad Boy's 10th Anniversary... The Hits: Released: March 9, 2004; Singles: "Victory 2004"; RIAA certification: Gold
2004	Bad Boy's R&B Hits: Released: November 23, 2004
2016	Bad Boy 20th Anniversary Box Set Edition: Released: August 12, 2016
