= G. Dep =

American rapper

- Also known as: Ghetto Deputy
- Born: Trevell Gerald Coleman; November 19, 1974 (age 52)
- Origin: Manhattan, New York City, U.S.
- Genre: Hip hop
- Occupation: Rapper
- Years active: 1995–2011; 2024–present
- Labels: Bad Boy; Famous

Trevell Gerald Coleman (born November 19, 1974), better known by his stage name G. Dep (which stands for "Ghetto Dependent"), is an American rapper from Harlem, New York City. He joined Bad Boy Records in 1998 and released his debut album Child of the Ghetto in 2001. He released his second album Ghetto Legend on September 7, 2010, with Famous Records.

== Early life ==
Trevell Coleman was born on November 19, 1974. He was raised by his grandmother in the James Weldon Johnson Housing Projects.

== Music career ==
His rap career started with the label Tape Kingz, releasing two 12" singles in 1996 and 1997. After meeting with Sean Combs in 1998, G. Dep was signed to a $350,000, five-album deal with Bad Boy Records. In the next year, he appeared on two songs on Black Rob's 1999 debut album Life Story. G. Dep released his debut solo album Child of the Ghetto in 2001. Child of the Ghetto peaked at No. 106 on Billboard 200 and No. 23 on Top R&B/Hip-Hop Albums. Single "Special Delivery" from the album peaked at No. 59 on Hot R&B/Hip-Hop Songs and No. 3 on Hot Rap Singles.

G. Dep was subsequently dropped from Bad Boy Records. G. Dep and Loon released independent album Bad Boy in 2007. He released his second album Ghetto Legend on September 7, 2010 with Famous Records.

== Personal life ==
Coleman stated in an interview that he has been convicted of robbery and served time in Rikers Island. Coleman's criminal record includes arrests for drug offenses, burglary and grand larceny more than 25 times since 2003.

After the release of Child of the Ghetto, Coleman had a long-time struggle with PCP addiction. In 2008, Coleman told XXL about his substance abuse problems and rehabilitation. At the time of his latest arrest Coleman was in Narcotics Anonymous' twelve-step program.

Coleman married Laticia Evans Coleman in May 2017, and wed at Elmira Correctional Facility. Evans is a recording artist who performs under the stage names Hustle Bunny. The two met in 2015 over the phone during Coleman's incarceration and instantly bonded, both were previously married. Laticia comes to the marriage with five children.

== Murder case ==
On December 15, 2010, Coleman walked into the 25th Precinct to confess to a cold case crime, the murder of a Queens man in 1993. Coleman had attempted to confess twice before, but was previously considered to be under the influence of drugs and incoherent.

On October 19, 1993, John Henkel was shot in the chest by a .40-caliber handgun outside of James Weldon Johnson Houses on Park Avenue and East 114th Street. Coleman stated that he ambushed and shot Henkel during an attempted robbery and fled the scene, throwing his weapon into the East River. Coleman's information matched with the case and he was charged with murder. Coleman stated in an interview that he confessed because the case weighed on him and he was "just trying to get things right between himself and God." Coleman claimed that he did not know that his victim had died.

Coleman pleaded not guilty to second-degree murder at his appearance in the New York Supreme Court on January 13, 2011. He was convicted of the second-degree murder charge on April 17, 2012, and was sentenced to 15-years to life in prison on May 8, 2012. He was housed at Fishkill Correctional Facility in Beacon, New York. In December 2023, Coleman's sentence was commuted by Governor Kathy Hochul, making him eligible for parole. In April 2024, he was released.

== Discography ==
- Child of the Ghetto (2001)
- Bad Boy with Loon (2007)
- Ghetto Legend (2010)
- Influential (2024)
- Stay Ready with Shzzy 8ando (2025)
- Off The Count (2026)
