= Loon (rapper) =

American rapper from New York

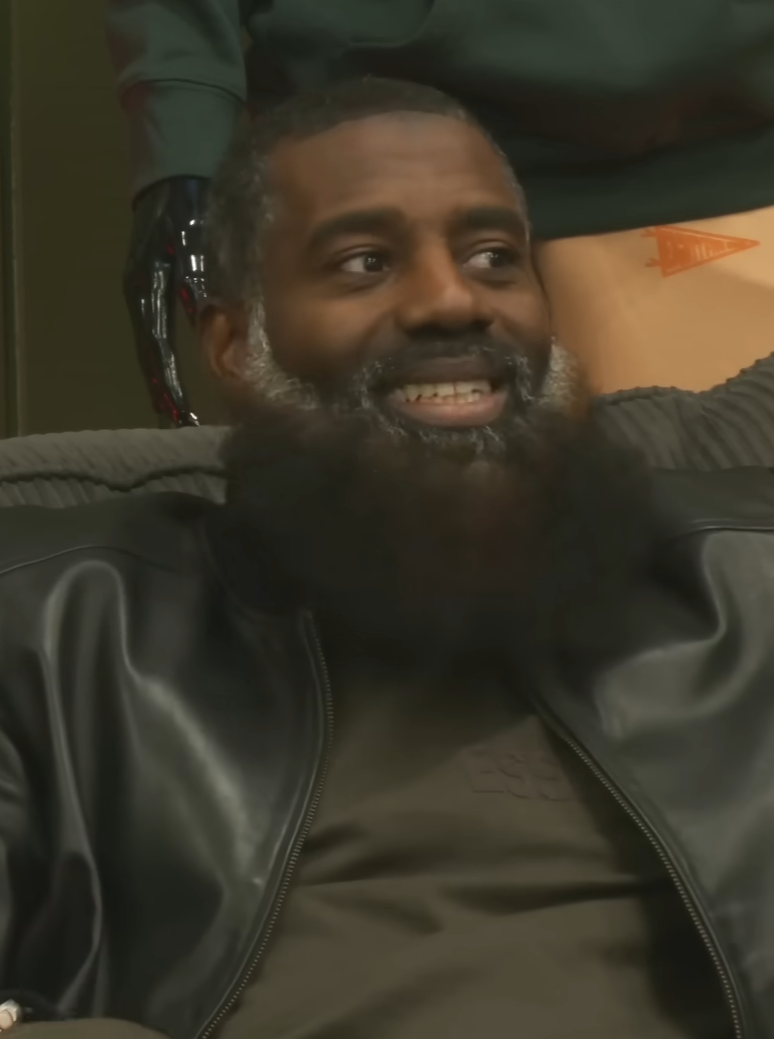
- Loon in 2024

Background information
- Also known as: Amir Junaid Muhadith
- Born: Chauncey Lamont Hawkins; June 20, 1975 (age 51); Manhattan, New York City, U.S.
- Genre: East Coast hip-hop
- Occupations: Rapper; songwriter
- Instrument: Vocals
- Years active: 1995–2009
- Labels: Boss Up; Siccness; The Orchard; Cleopatra; Universal; Bad Boy; Arista
- Formerly of: Harlem World
- Children: Sade Hawkins; Bryce Hawkins

Amir Junaid Muhadith (born Chauncey Lamont Hawkins; June 20, 1975), better known by his stage name Loon, is an American former rapper. He is best known for his work with fellow New York rapper Sean "Puff Daddy" Combs, having signed with his record label Bad Boy Records in 1999. Loon most notably guest appeared on Combs' 2002 singles "I Need a Girl (Part One)" and "I Need a Girl (Part Two)," which peaked at numbers two and four on the Billboard Hot 100, respectively.

Prior, he formed the New York City-based hip hop group Harlem World in 1995, with whom he released one studio album—The Movement (1999)—before disbanding in 1999. As a solo act, Loon signed with Arista Records, and later Bad Boy Records that same year to release his eponymous debut studio album (2003). Despite mixed reviews, it was met with commercial success and peaked at number six on the Billboard 200. He then parted ways with the label in the following year due to his conversion to Islam, and released three independent albums until his retirement from recording altogether in 2009.

== Career ==
Chauncey Lamont Hawkins was born in Harlem, New York. He began his musical career as a member of Mase's rap collective Harlem World in 1995, and signed with Arista Records after their 1999 disbandment. He also began working severally with group cohort Mase; due to Mase signing with P. Diddy's Bad Boy Records, Loon was led by proximity to sign with the label himself, as it was also an imprint of Arista.

He made his first solo appearance on the Billboard Hot 100 for his guest feature on label mate Faith Evans' 2001 single "You Gets No Love" alongside Diddy, which peaked at number 38 on the chart. Bad Boy parted ways with Arista the following year, and the Bad Boy roster, including Loon, was thereafter moved to Universal Records. 2002 also saw Loon guest performing on the commercially successful singles "I Need a Girl (Part One)" and "I Need a Girl (Part Two)" both by Diddy, as well as "I Do (Wanna Get Close to You)" by 3LW and "Hit the Freeway" by Toni Braxton; the former two peaked at numbers two and four on the chart, respectively. During his time with Bad Boy, Loon served as a ghostwriter on songs by or featuring Diddy, having co-written Mario Winans' 2004 single "I Don't Wanna Know" as well as Diddy's 2001 eponymous single.

His 2003 debut commercial single, "Down For Me" (featuring Mario Winans) peaked at number 24 on the Billboard Hot 100 and remains his highest charting song as a lead artist. It's follow-up, "How You Like That" (featuring Kelis) peaked at number 88 on the chart. Both preceded the release of his self-titled debut studio album in October of that year, which peaked at number six on the Billboard 200 and saw mixed reviews. Loon left Bad Boy Records in the following year to launch his own record label, Boss Up Entertainment. He then retired from the music industry entirely in 2009.

== Conversion to Islam ==
Loon converted to Islam in December 2008 after a trip to Abu Dhabi, and Dubai, UAE. Born Chauncey Lamont Hawkins, he officially changed his name to Amir Junaid Muhadith after traveling to Mecca, Saudi Arabia, the holiest site of Islam, to perform Umrah. After having converted to Islam, he subsequently ended his music career and would later relocate to Cairo, Egypt where he lived until 2011, and then lastly moved back to the United States of America from 2011 to 2022, and stayed in the United States of America in 2022.

== Legal issues ==
On November 22, 2011, Muhadith was arrested while on a trip to Brussels. He was extradited to the United States in May 2012 and was sentenced to 14 years imprisonment in July 2013 for conspiracy with intent to traffic one or more kilograms of heroin. Many reports have advocated for and confirmed his innocence.

Amid the COVID-19 pandemic effects in prison centers, Muhadith was granted early release on July 29, 2020.

== Discography ==
=== Studio albums ===
Album details	Peak positions
Album details	Billboard 200
Loon: Released: October 21, 2003; Label: Bad Boy, Universal; Singles: "How You Want That", "Down for Me"	6
No Friends: Released: August 29, 2006; Label: Cleopatra	
Wizard of Harlem: Released: October 17, 2006; Label: Siccness	
Bad Boy: Released: February 13, 2007; Label: Siccness; Collaboration album with G. Dep	

=== Singles ===
==== As lead artist ====
Title	Year	Peak chart positions					Album
Title	Year	US	US R&B	US Rap	AUS	UK	Album
"Down for Me" (featuring Mario Winans)	2003	103	28	19	—	—	Loon
"How You Want That" (featuring Kelis)	2003	88	41	—	—	—	Loon
"Show Me Your Soul" (with P. Diddy, Lenny Kravitz and Pharrell)	2003	—	—	—	45	35	Bad Boys II soundtrack
"Who Is Dat" (featuring T-Pain)	2007	—	—	—	—	—	—N/a

==== As featured artist ====
Title	Year	Peak chart positions					Certifications	Album
Title	Year	US	US R&B	US Rap	AUS	UK	Certifications	Album
"Promise (So So Def Remix)" (Jagged Edge featuring Loon)	2000	—	—	—	—	—		Promise
"You Gets No Love" (Faith Evans featuring P. Diddy & Loon)	2001	38	8	—	—	124		Faithfully
"I Need a Girl (Part One)" (P. Diddy featuring Usher & Loon)	2002	2	2	1	5	4		We Invented the Remix
"I Need a Girl (Part Two)" (P. Diddy featuring Ginuwine, Mario Winans, Tammy Ruggieri & Loon)	2002	4	2	2	—	4	BPI: Silver	We Invented the Remix
"I Do (Wanna Get Close to You)" (3LW featuring P. Diddy & Loon)	2002	58	50	—	41	—		A Girl Can Mack
"Young & Sexy" (Lyric featuring Loon)	2002	—	79	—	—	—		Lyric
"Hit the Freeway" (Toni Braxton featuring Loon)	2002	86	32	—	46	29		More Than a Woman
"Crazy" (Dream featuring Loon)	2003	—	—	—	—	—		Reality

==== Guest appearances ====
- 1998: "Back Up Off The Wall" Brand Nubian (uncredited)
- 2002: "How U Want Dat" (Remix) by the Game
- 2003: "Tru Rider" (Mowett feat. Loon)
- 2003: "Gangsta Sh*t" (Snoop Dogg feat. Loon)
- 2004: “Whatchu Sayin’” (Truth Hurts feat. Loon)
- 2005: "Smile for Me" (Massari feat. Loon)
- 2009: "What You Say" (Loon feat. Christopher)
- 2009: "No Way Nobody" (Karl Wolf feat. Loon)

== Filmography ==
Films

Year	Title	Role	Notes
2003	Death of a Dynasty	Turk	directed by Damon Dash
2005	State Property 2	El Pollo Loco's father	directed by Damon Dash
