= Rob "Reef" Tewlow =

Rob Tewlow
- Also known as: Reef
- Born: Robert F. Tewlow
- Origin: New York, New York, U.S.
- Genres: Hip hop
- Occupations: Record producer; audio engineer; A&R; music executive
- Years active: 1994–present
- Label: Atlantic

Rob Tewlow, professionally known by his moniker Reef, is an American musician, record producer and audio engineer from New York City. He is a former music journalist at The Source and a former A&R music executive for Atlantic Records' hip-hop department. He also worked at the SiriusXM's station's hip-hop channel Shade 45 as an executive.

Tewlow was brought by editor Matteo "Matty C" Capuluongo to work as a music reviewer and photographer for hip-hop magazine The Source, where he contributed from 1991 to 1992 before leaving to work as an A&R at Atlantic Records. In 1992, he signed hip hop duo Artifacts, composed of Tame One and El Da Sensei, to Big Beat Records.

As a record producer, Tewlow helmed his hip hop production on Bad Meets Evil's "Nuttin' to Do" and "Scary Movies", 50 Cent's "What Up Gangsta" and Doja Cat's "Tonight", also producing for the likes of Hussein Fatal, The High & Mighty, Fat Joe, Trick Daddy, B Rich, Royce da 5′9″, Cage, Dilated Peoples and Yo Gotti. On July 12, 2011, Jon Connor released his digital album, which was produced entirely produced by Tewlow.

At the 64th Annual Grammy Awards held on 2022, he was nominated for a Grammy Award for Album of the Year for his production duties on Doja Cat's Planet Her (Deluxe).

== Production discography ==
1990s

- 1994: Down South — "Sitting Here" from Lost In Brooklyn (co-prod.; prod. by Shawn J Period)
- 1996: Sadat X & Grand Puba — "The Next Spot" from High School High: The Soundtrack (add. prod.; prod. by Dante Ross, Grand Puba & Sadat X)
- 1997: Artifacts — "Art of Scratch (Intro)" from That's Them
- 1997: Mobb Deep — "The After Hours G.O.D. Pt. III" (add. prod. w/ DJ Mighty Mi; prod. by Mobb Deep)
- 1997: Ill-Advised — "Gimme tha Mic" from Can U Smell It
- 1998: Hussein Fatal — "I Know the Rules" and "Getto Star" from In the Line of Fire
- 1998: Bad Meets Evil — "Nuttin' to Do" and "Scary Movies"
- 1998: Mad Skillz — "The Conceited Bastard"
- 1998: Mr. Eon, Baby Blak & Pauly Yamz — "All in Together" from Eastern Conference All Stars (prod. w/ DJ Mighty Mi)
- 1999: The High & Mighty — "The Half" and "Weed" from Home Field Advantage

2000s

- 2000: Triple Seis — "Some Shit" and "Roll Till We Bankrupt"
- 2001: Fat Joe — "Fight Club" from Jealous Ones Still Envy (J.O.S.E.)
- 2002: Trick Daddy — "Rain It Pours" from Thug Holiday
- 2002: B Rich — "Playin' Games" from 80 Dimes (add. prod. by Mike Caren)
- 2002: The High & Mighty — "Nowhere to Hide At" from Air Force 1
- 2002: Royce da 5′9″ — "Take His Life", "Nickel Nine Is..." and "Soldier's Story" from Rock City
- 2003: Triple Seis — "Coast 2 Coast" and "Godfather" from Only Time'll Tell
- 2003: 50 Cent — "What Up Gangsta" from Get Rich or Die Tryin'
- 2003: Tame One — "Dreamz" from When Rappers Attack
- 2003: Cage — "Leak Bros." from Weatherproof
- 2003: Jamelia — "Superstar (Rob 'Reef' Tewlow Remix)"
- 2003: The High & Mighty & R.A. the Rugged Man — "Betcha Life" from The Highlite Zone (co-prod.; prod. by DJ Mighty Mi)
- 2003: The High & Mighty, Cage & Tame One — "Live From the Bullpen" from The Highlite Zone
- 2004: Royce da 5′9″ — "What I Know" from Death Is Certain
- 2004: Dilated Peoples — "Tryin' to Breathe" from Neighborhood Watch
- 2004: Royce da 5′9″ & Kid Vishis — "Brothers Keeper" from The M.I.C. Official Mixtape
- 2004: The UN — "It's Over" from Eastern Conference All Stars IV

2010s

- 2011: Jon Connor — Salvation
- 2016: Yo Gotti — "I Remember" from White Friday (CM9)

2020s

- 2021: Doja Cat — "Tonight" from Planet Her (Deluxe)

== Other credits ==
Big Beat/Atlantic Records

- 1992: O.F.T.B. — Straight Up Watts (A&R coordinator)
- 1992: Double X Posse — Put Ya Boots On (A&R coordinator)
- 1994: Artifacts — Between a Rock and a Hard Place (executive producer, A&R direction)
  - Artifacts — "Wrong Side of da Tracks" (executive producer, A&R direction, editing)
  - Artifacts — "C'mon wit da Git Down" (executive producer, A&R)
  - Artifacts — "Dynamic Soul" (executive producer, A&R)
- 1994: Down South – Lost In Brooklyn (A&R direction)
  - Down South – "Southern Comfort" (mixing)
  - Down South – "Tractors, Rakes, and Hoes" (mixing)
  - Down South – "Sitting Here" (mixing)
- 1994: DFC – "Digga Bigga Ditch (Evil Radio Mix)" (mixing)
- 1995: Junior M.A.F.I.A. – Conspiracy (A&R coordinator)
- 1995: Double X Posse — Ruff, Rugged & Raw (executive producer, A&R direction)
  - Double X Posse — "He Asked For It"/"Make Some Noise" (executive producer)
  - Double X Posse — "Stop That Playin'"/"Wreckin' It"/"The Ill Real" (executive producer)
- 1996: Mad Skillz — From Where??? (executive producer, A&R direction)
  - Mad Skillz — "The Nod Factor" (executive producer)
  - Mad Skillz — "Move Ya Body" (executive producer)
- 1996: Real Live — The Turnaround: The Long Awaited Drama (A&R)
  - Real Live — "Real Live Shit" (A&R)
  - Real Live — "Real Live Shit (Remix)" (executive producer, A&R)
  - Real Live — "The Turnaround" (A&R)
- 1996: Music From And Inspired By The Motion Picture High School High (associate producer)
  - Sadat X & Grand Puba — "The Next Spot" (mixing)
- 1997: Artifacts — That's Them (executive producer, A&R)
  - Artifacts — "Art of Facts" (A&R)
  - Artifacts — "The Ultimate" (executive producer, A&R)

Loud/RCA Records

- 1997: Mobb Deep — "The After Hours G.O.D. Pt. III" (re-mixing)

Game Recordings

- 1998: Bad Meets Evil — "Nuttin' to Do"/"Scary Movies" (mixing)

Terror Squad/Big Beat/Atlantic Records

- 1998: Fat Joe — Don Cartagena (co-executive producer, A&R)
  - Fat Joe — "Bet Ya Man Can't (Triz)" (co-executive producer)
  - Fat Joe — "Misery Needs Company" (keyboards, additional programming)

Eastern Conference Records

- 1998: Mad Skillz — "The Conceited Bastard" (executive producer)

Atlantic Records

- 1998: Nicole Renée — "The Boy Next Door" from Nicole Renée (drum programming)

Game Recordings

- 1999: Royce da 5′9″ — "Take His Life" (mixing)

Rawkus Records

- 1998: KRS-One, Zack de La Rocha & The Last Emperor — "CIA (Division-I Remix)" (arranger)
- 1999: The High & Mighty — "Dick Starbuck "Porno Detective"" from Home Field Advantage (additional drum programming)
- 1999: The High & Mighty — "The Half" and "Weed" from Home Field Advantage (mixing)
- 1999: The High & Mighty — "Hands On Experience Pt. II" from Home Field Advantage (drum programming)

Terror Squad/Big Beat/Atlantic Records

- 1999: Terror Squad — The Album (co-executive producer, A&R)
  - Terror Squad — "Whatcha Gon Do" (co-executive producer)
  - Terror Squad — "All Around the World" (mixing)

Game Recordings

- 2000: Royce da 5′9″ — "Soldier's Story" (mixing)

Terror Squad/Atlantic Records

- 2000: Cuban Link — "Flowers for the Dead" (executive producer)

Atlantic/Warner Sunset Records

- 2000: Music From The Motion Picture Any Given Sunday (A&R)

Terror Squad/Atlantic Records

- 2001: Fat Joe — Jealous Ones Still Envy (J.O.S.E.) (co-executive producer, A&R)
  - Fat Joe — "We Thuggin'" (co-executive producer, A&R)
  - Fat Joe — "What's Luv?" (co-executive producer)
- 2002: Fat Joe — Loyalty (co-executive producer, A&R)
  - Fat Joe — "Fight Club" (executive producer)

Eastern Conference Records

- 2003: Cage — "Leak Bros" from Weatherproof (mixing, arrangement)

Parlophone

- 2003: Jamelia — "Superstar (Rob 'Reef' Tewlow Remix)" (mixing, arrangement)

VP Records

- 2003: Wayne Wonder, Mobb Deep, Fat Joe & Surprise — "Enemies (Remix)" (production coordinator)

Koch Records

- 2004: Royce da 5′9″ — "What I Know" from Death Is Certain (mixing)

Fourfivesix Entertainment/W.O.R.L.D Records

- 2004: The UN — UN Or U Out (A&R)

Terror Squad/Atlantic Records

- 2005: Fat Joe — All or Nothing (A&R)
  - Fat Joe — "Get It Poppin'" (A&R)

== Awards and nominations ==
| Year | Nominee / work | Award | Result | Ref. |
|---|---|---|---|---|
| 2022 | Planet Her (Deluxe) | Grammy Award for Album of the Year | Nominated | |
