= Real Steel (soundtrack) =

2011 soundtrack albums

The music to the 2011 science fiction sports film Real Steel directed by Shawn Levy, featured a compilation of songs by popular artists as heard in the film and an album that contains the original score written and composed by Danny Elfman. The first album, Real Steel – Music from the Motion Picture, was released on October 4, 2011 by Interscope Records. It consists of 13 tracks featuring artists including Foo Fighters, Tom Morello, Eminem, Royce da 5'9" (Bad Meets Evil), The Crystal Method, Yelawolf, 50 Cent and Limp Bizkit. Elfman's score that featured over 17 tracks, was released into a separate album as Real Steel – Original Score on November 8, 2011 by Varèse Sarabande.

== Real Steel – Music from the Motion Picture ==
Real Steel – Music from the Motion Picture

Soundtrack album by Various artists
- Released: October 4, 2011
- Genre: Electronic; hip hop; alternative pop; alternative rock; folk rock; nu metal; heavy metal; breakbeat; post-grunge; indie rock
- Length: 48:53
- Label: Interscope
- Producer: Anthony Seyler; Jennifer Hawks; Shawn Levy; Gretchen Anderson

=== Background ===
During the film's post-production process, Levy had called few of the artists to the editing room such as The Crystal Method, Timberland and Beastie Boys and showcased few scenes which they approved and this let to Levy developing a soundtrack for the film. He mentioned that Levy was a fan of Crystal Method, and while one of the songs the writer had written was "a magnificent song for this kind of lonely man montage two-third of the film", he contacted him in person, but refuted the offer so that he could use in one of his album or Levy's future films. Later, he called the duo and screened the fight sequences in the edit, and few of the scenes, including the "rousing" emotional sequences. The duo had written two different songs; "Bring the Noise" served as the introduction to Noisy Boy and a piece for the climatic fight of Zeus and Atom, that worked well. But after mixing the score, he felt that the sounds of the duo is "exactly the same pitch as the robot sound effects" which left them unheard. Later Crystal Method, collaborated with the score composer Elfman who wrote an overlay of the track that worked "exceptionally well".

Levy recalled a year ago, on collaborating with Timbaland for a hip-hop song, though some of his friends disagreed. One of his friends had shared a clip of the film to his studio which led him to meet the rapper. He showcased the full film with Timbaland and his kids, after which he agreed to do the end credits song as his kid liked and danced to the tune. Levy felt that "he was so enthused on seeing the film" which led him to write the song.

On the music supervision budget, Levy said "you always sign off on a music budget for a movie and it's X, and you're kind of like 'Eh, that's not gonna be enough,' but it's this game that you kind of have to play [...] you always know that if the movie works, and if you have a good test screening and good preview, and the studio sees a certain song that you can't afford in the movie, 7 out of 10 times they will pay for that song, and they'll go into what's called breakage to give you that song. So yeah the budget grew a little bit and we had a lot of flexibility with the artists."

=== Track listing ===
No.	Title	Music	Length
1.	"Fast Lane"	Bad Meets Evil	4:12
2.	"Here's A Little Something For Ya"	Beastie Boys	3:09
3.	"Miss The Misery"	Foo Fighters	4:32
4.	"The Enforcer"	50 Cent	3:25
5.	"Make Some Noise (Put 'em Up)"	The Crystal Method	3:27
6.	"'Till I Collapse"	Eminem	4:59
7.	"One Man Army"	The Prodigy	4:15
8.	"Give It A Go"	Timbaland, Veronica	4:20
9.	"The Midas Touch"	Tom Morello	3:28
10.	"Why Try"	Limp Bizkit	2:53
11.	"Torture"	Rival Sons	3:37
12.	"All My Days"	Alexi Murdoch	4:56
13.	"Kenton"	Danny Elfman	1:40
14.	"Nine Thou"	Styles of Beyond	3:48
Total length:			52:41

=== Charts ===
Chart (2011	Peak position
US Soundtrack Albums (Billboard)	15

== Real Steel – Original Score ==
Real Steel – Original Score

Film score by Danny Elfman
- Released: November 8, 2011
- Studio: Barbra Streisand Scoring Stage, Sony Pictures Studios; Studio Della Morte
- Genre: Film score
- Length: 42:19
- Label: Varèse Sarabande
- Producer: Danny Elfman

Danny Elfman chronology
Restless (2011)	Real Steel (2011)	Dark Shadows (2012)

Danny Elfman was chosen to compose the film's score as Levy felt that he would be one of the few composers who could do a score similar to that of the Rocky franchise, alternating guitar-based ambient music and songs with a full orchestra. The score album containing 19 tracks were released by Varèse Sarabande on November 8, 2011.

=== Reception ===
Filmtracks.com wrote "Real Steel is a score with uniquely packaged character, smart thematic loyalty, and one hell of a narrative conclusion, and any other composer attempting to match its quality in a possible sequel will face a potentially impossible challenge." James Southall of Movie Wave commented "Elfman is a professional, so everything here is technically proficient, some of the tunes are fun, but it doesn't go beyond what any reasonably-competent film composer might have written – there's no personality here, only occasional hints that it was actually the work of a composer whose very strong musical personality is actually one of the strongest reasons he's been so successful and remains so popular. It's enjoyable fluff, for sure, but fluff nonetheless."

Daniel Schweiger of Assignment X wrote "While Real Steel starts off with raw, strumming simplicity, Elfman gradually brings in his more recognizable strings lines, heavenly choirs (with a particularly angelic voice provided by Poe) and fighting mad orchestra, with thumping, metal grunge leading to the big moment in the robot ring." James Christopher Monger of AllMusic said "Danny Elfman's surprisingly upbeat and uplifting score trades in many of the composer's signature moves (ghostly choirs and quirky, symphonic bombast) for a more lyrical approach. Rooted in bluesy, country-folk guitar and John Williams-esque slabs of pastoral Americana, Elfman still gets in the occasional explosion, but there's a comfy, rootsy vibe that permeates the score and echoes fellow composer Greg Edmonson's work on Joss Whedon's beloved outlaw sci-fi television series Firefly."

Thomas Glorieux of Maintitles.net wrote "Danny Elfman has scared some people with his occasional quirky scores, but Real Steel is not that at all. On the contrary, it's straightforward and it barely contains his usual voice (only the use of choir hints us of his presence). Plus the biggest strength is the undeniably amazing effect it has in the movie, literally uplifting every emotional scene and each heroic fight. Making it a must to see and hear inside the context for those who are still somewhat undecided."

=== Track listing ===
All music is composed by Danny Elfman.

No.	Title	Length
1.	"Charlie Trains Atom"	1:59
2.	"On The Move"	2:39
3.	"Into The Zoo"	1:02
4.	"Why We're Here (feat. vocal by Poe)"	0:55
5.	"Meet Atom"	3:17
6.	"It's Your Choice"	1:28
7.	"Safe With Me"	2:57
8.	"Atom Versus Twin Cities"	3:12
9.	"...For A Kiss"	0:56
10.	"Get in the Truck"	1:12
11.	"Bonding"	2:01
12.	"Twin Cities' Intro"	1:20
13.	"Parkway Motel (feat. vocal by Poe)"	1:47
14.	"This Is A Brawl"	1:48
15.	"You Deserve Better"	4:02
16.	"Into The Ring"	1:12
17.	"Taking A Beating"	1:33
18.	"Final Round"	6:53
19.	"People's Champion"	2:06
Total length:		42:19

=== Credits ===
Credits adapted from CD liner notes.

- Score producer – Danny Elfman
- Soundtrack producer – Bill Abbott, Danny Elfman
- Musical assistance – Melisa McGregor, Melissa Karaban
- Recording – Adam Olmstead, Dennis Sands
- Additional recording – Greg Maloney
- Mixing – Dennis Sands
- Mastering – Patricia Sullivan
- Editing – Bill Abbott
- Copyist – Reprise Music Services, Rob Skinnell
- Scoring crew – Adam Michalak, Dave Marquette, Greg Loskorn, Mark Eshelman
- Auricle operator – Richard Grant
- MIDI controller – Marc Mann
- Executive producer – Robert Townson
- DreamWorks music executive – Jennifer Hawks

Instruments

- Bass – Bruce Morgenthaler, Chris Kollgaard, Drew Dembowski, Ed Meares, Oscar Hidalgo, Sue Ranney
- Bass guitar – Chris Chaney
- Bassoon – Ken Munday, Rose Corrigan
- Cello – Andrew Shulman, Tony Cooke, Armen Ksajikian, Cecilia Tsan, Dennis Karmazyn, Erika Duke, Giovanna Clayton, Paul Cohen, Steve Erdody, Steve Richards, Tim Landauer, Trevor Handy
- Clarinet – Gary Bovyer, Ralph Williams
- Drums – Josh Freese
- Flute – Heather Clark, Louise Ditullio
- French horn – Dan Kelley, Dylan Hart, Jennie Kim, Joe Meyer, Mark Adams, Nathan Campbell, Phil Yao, Steve Becknell
- Guitar – Aaron Kaplan, George Doering
- Harp – Katie Kirkpatrick
- Oboe – Leslie Reed, Phil Ayling
- Piano – Thomas J Lindgren
- Percussion – Bob Zimmitti, Emil Richards, Mike Fisher
- Timpani – Peter Limonick
- Trombone – Alan Kaplan, Alex Iles, Bill Reichenbach, Charlie Loper, Phil Teele, Steve Holtman
- Trumpet – Jon Lewis, Malcolm Mc Nab, Rick Baptist, Warren Luening
- Tuba – Doug Tornquist
- Viola – Andrew Duckles, Brian Dembow, Darren Mc Cann, David Walther, Keith Greene, Marlow Fisher, Matt Funes, Rob Brophy, Roland Kato, Shawn Mann, Thomas Diener, Vickie Miskolczy
- Violin – Alan Grunfeld, Alyssa Park, Ana Landauer, Carol Pool, Darius Campo, Eve Butler, Helen Nightingale, Jackie Brand, Jennie Levin, Josefina Vergara, Julie Gigante, Julie Rogers, Katia Popov, Lily Ho Chen, Marc Sazer, Natalie Leggett, Neel Hammond, Phil Levy, Roberto Cani, Roger Wilkie, Sarah Thornblade, Shalini Vijayan, Sid Page, Tereza Stanislav
- Violin [Principal 2nd] – Richard Altenbach

Choir

- Choir – Page LA Studio Voices
- Vocals – Alice Kirwan Murray, Amick Byram, Amy Engelhardt, Antonio Sol, Baraka May, Beth Andersen, Bobbi Page, Christa Gates, Christine Guter, Clydene Jackson, David Joyce, Debbie Hall Gleason, Diane Freiman Reynolds, Dick Wells, Donna Medine, Elin Carlson, Elissa Johnston, Gerald White, Greg Jasperse, Guy Maeda, Jennifer Barnes, Joanna Bushnell, Karen Harper, Karen Whipple Schnurr, Leanna Brand, Luana Jackman, Mary Hylan, Nancy Gassner-Clayton, Norman Large, Rudy Cardenas, Sally Stevens, Scottie Haskell, Susie Stevens, Teri Koide Culbreath, Victoria Levy, Walt Harrah
- Vocal contractor – Bobbi Page

Orchestra

- Performer – The Hollywood Studio Symphony
- Orchestration – Dave Sloanaker, Edgardo Simone
- Supervising orchestrator – Steve Bartek
- Conductor – Pete Anthony
- Orchestra contractor – Gina Zimmitti
- Concertmaster – Bruce Dukov
