= Supa Dups =

Jamaican record producer

- Born: Dwayne Chin-Quee; Kingston, Jamaica
- Genres: Reggae; dancehall; hip-hop; R&B
- Occupations: Sound system DJ; record producer; selector; remixer
- Years active: 1999–present
- Member of: Black Chiney
- Website: BlackChiney.com

Dwayne Chin-Quee, better known as Supa Dups, is a Jamaican record producer, remixer and selector based in Miami, Florida. He is a member of the Black Chiney sound system. He is of Chinese-Afro-Jamaican descent.

== Production discography ==
=== Albums ===
2004

- Nina Sky – Nina Sky – 04. "Turnin' Me On"
- Beenie Man – Back to Basics – 10. "Eloh", 12. "Pussy Language"
- Capleton – Reign of Fire – 12. "Who Yuh Callin' Nigga"

2005

- Sean Paul – The Trinity – 15. "Straight Up"
- David Banner – Certified – 18. "Shake That Booty" (Krumpa Remix) [iTunes bonus track] (featuring Elephant Man)
- Rihanna – Music of the Sun – 04. "You Don't Love Me (No, No, No)" (featuring Vybz Kartel)
- Pitbull – Money Is Still a Major Issue – 06. "Turnin Me On (Remix)" (with Nina Sky, featuring Pitbull & Shawnna)

2006

- Beenie Man – Undisputed – 13. "Set You Free"
- Tami Chynn – Out of Many...One – 04. "Hot!!!"

2007

- Collie Buddz – Collie Buddz – 02. "Blind To You", 04. "Tomorrow's Another Day", 10. "Sensimillia" (featuring Roache)
- Notch – Raised by the People – 06. "Layaway Love", 08. "Traemelo", 11. "Ella Se Fue", 13. "No Problema", 15. "Mano y Mano", 16. "Verme" (Caribbean Remix) (featuring Baby Ranks), 17. "Chévere" (Remix) (featuring Voltio), 19. "Bun Out Bad Mind"
- Wayne Wonder – Foreva – 15. "L.O.V.E"

2008

- Estelle – Shine – 06. "Come Over"
- Kardinal Offishall – Not 4 Sale – 07. "Numba 1 (Tide Is High)" (featuring Rihanna), 09. "Nina"
- John Legend – Evolver – 07. "No Other Love" (featuring Estelle), 14. "Can't Be My Lover" (featuring Buju Banton)
- Shontelle – Shontelligence – 06. "Life Is Not an Easy Road"

2009

- Sean Paul – Imperial Blaze – 18. "Straight From My Heart" (co-production)
- Mary J. Blige – Stronger with Each Tear – 07. "Each Tear"

2010

- Eminem – Recovery – 05. "W.T.P."
- Bruno Mars – Doo-Wops & Hooligans – 03. "Our First Time", 08. "Liquor Store Blues" (featuring Damian Marley)

2011

- Bad Meets Evil – Hell: The Sequel – 02. "Fast Lane"
- Elephant Man – Dance & Sweep! Adventures of the Energy God – 07. "Clear" (featuring Kardinal Offishall)
- Cris Cab – Foreword (EP) – 02. "Better Off Running", 06. "How Was I Supposed to Know"
- Pushim – Milestone – 02. "Mr. Teaser" (Japan)
- DA & the Supa Dups – Black Chiney Orchestra – "Who Do You Know", "Too Cool" (featuring Vybz Kartel)
- Drake – Take Care – 07. "Buried Alive Interlude" (featuring Kendrick Lamar)

2012

- Stacy Barthe – In the Inbetween (EP) – 01. "Find Your Way", 03. "No Strings Attached", 09. "Keep It Like It Is"
- Cris Cab – Echo Boom (EP) – "In My Dreams"
- Tyga – Careless World: Rise of the Last King – 22. "Still Got It" (featuring Drake)
- Melanie Fiona – The MF Life – deluxe edition: 17. "Like I Love You"
- Cover Drive – Bajan Style – 09. "Can't Live in a World" (UK)
- Chris Rene – I'm Right Here – 03. "Back from the Dead"
- Cody Simpson – Paradise – 05. "Tears On Your Pillow"
- Christina Aguilera – Lotus – 10. "Around the World"
- Bruno Mars – Unorthodox Jukebox – 08. "Show Me"

2013

- Snoop Lion – Reincarnated – 08. "Smoke the Weed" (featuring Collie Buddz)
- Jay Sean – Neon – 14. "Sucka for You"
- Juicy J – Stay Trippy – 18. "Having Sex" (featuring Trina and 2 Chainz)
- Tiara Thomas – Dear Sallie Mae – "Tell Me Something"

2014

- Tessanne Chin – Count on My Love – "Everything Reminds Me of You"
- The Dirty Heads – Sound of Change – 08. "Radio", 09. "Medusa" (featuring Ward 21)
- SOJA – Amid the Noise and Haste – entire album produced by Supa Dups; includes 02. "Your Song" (featuring Damian Marley), 03. "I Believe" (featuring Michael Franti & Nahko), 04. "Easier" (featuring Anuhea and J-Boog), 05. "Shadow" (featuring Trevor Young of SOJA)
- Chris Webby – Chemically Imbalanced – 07. "Brim Low", 15. "Stand Up"

2015

- Kid Ink – Full Speed (deluxe edition) – "Show Must Go On" (featuring MGK and Math Allen)
- Sublime with Rome – Sirens – 02. "Where Did You Go", 05. "Been Losing Sleep"
- Collie Buddz – Blue Dreamz – 06. "Repeat", 07. "Prescription"
- R.City – What Dreams Are Made Of – 12. "Crazy Love" (featuring Tarrus Riley)

2016

- Rebelution – Falling Into Place – 01. "Know It All", 02. "Inhale Exhale" (featuring Protoje), 03. "Upper Hand", 04. "Lay My Claim", 06. "Santa Barbara", 07. "Those Days", 08. "Free Up Your Mind", 10. "High on Life"
- Michael Franti – Soulrocker – entire album co-produced with Stephen "Di Genius" McGregor & Michael Franti
- Drake – Views – 11. "Controlla", 16. "Too Good" (featuring Rihanna)
- Kid Ink – "Nasty" (featuring Jeremih & Spice) (additional production)
- PartyNextDoor – PartyNextDoor 3 – 04. "Not Nice"
- Black M – Éternel insatisfait – "Comme moi" (featuring Shakira)
- Usher – The Hamilton Mixtape – 04. "Wait for It"

2017

- Collie Buddz – Good Life – 01. "Control", 02. "Lovely Day", 03. "Part Of My Life", 04. "Save Me From The Rain" (featuring Kat Dahlia), 05. "Good Life", 06. "I Got You", 10. "Glass House"
- Nicky Jam – Fénix – 08. "No Te Puedo Olvidar", 19. "I Can't Forget You"
- Shakira – El Dorado – 02. "Nada", 05. "Amarillo", 08. "Comme Moi" (with Black M), 12. "What We Said" (Comme Moi English version) (featuring MAGIC!)
- Drake – "Signs"

2018

- Amara La Negra – "Insecure"
- Nicki Minaj – Queen – "Bed" (featuring Ariana Grande)
- Estelle – Lovers Rock – 02. "Meet Up" (featuring Maleek Berry), 03. "Really Want" (featuring Konshens & Nick X Navi), 13. "Love Like Ours" (featuring Tarrus Riley), 14. "Good for Us"
- Kranium – "Sidung"
- Becky G – "Zooted" (featuring French Montana & Farruko)

2019

- Becky G – "LBD"
- Mozart La Para – "Barbaro"
- Becky G – "Greenlight Go"
- Anitta & Becky G – Kisses – "Banana"
- Bad Gyal – "Hookah"
- Becky G – "Secrets"
- Sean Paul – "When It Comes to You"
- Six60 – Six60 – "Raining"
- Zhavia Ward – 17 (EP) – 04. "All I Am" (featuring Skip Marley)
- Popcaan – Vanquish (mixtape) – 02. "Love You"
- Kali Uchis & Khea – "Malvada" – Neon16 Tape: The Kids That Grew Up on Reggaeton

2020

- Jadakiss – Ignatius – "I Know" (featuring John Legend)
- Becky G – "They Ain't Ready"
- Popcaan – Fixtape – 11. "All I Need" (featuring Drake)
- Protoje – In Search of Lost Time – 03. "Still I Wonder", 04. "Weed & Ting", 05. "A Vibe" (featuring Wiz Khalifa)
- Kali Uchis – Sin Miedo (del Amor y Otros Demonios) – 09. "de nadie"
- Emanuel – Alt Therapy Session 2: Transformation (EP) – 04. "Black Woman" (remix)

2021

- Spice – 10 – 11. "Frenz"
- Angel 22 – "Free Hugs"
- Toian – "Driving Me Crazy"
- Kyle – "Optimistic" (featuring Dougie F)
- Bad Gyal – Warm Up (EP) – 02. "44" (featuring Rema)
- Bad Gyal – Sound System: The Final Releases – 01. "Nueva York (tot*)"

2022

- Shenseea – Alpha – 08. "Lying If I Call It Love" (featuring Sean Paul)
- Lauren Jauregui – Big Femme Energy Volume 1 – 02. "While I'm Alive"
- Stonebwoy – "Therapy"
- Becky G – Esquemas – 03. "Tajin" (featuring Guaynaa), 06. "Dolores", 08. "Borracha", 09. "Kill Bill", 10. "Que Le Muerda", 11. "Guapa"
- Sean Paul – Scorcha – 02. "Wine Up", 11. "Good Day", 16. "No Fear" (featuring Damian Marley and Nicky Jam)
- Dixie – A Letter to Me – 10. "On Your Toes"
- Papa San – Life Lessons – 02. "Love About You", 04. "I See You", 05. "None Like You", 06. "Take It All Jesus", 07. "Risky"
- Dvsn – Working on My Karma – 01. "Last Time" (featuring Yung Bleu) (mix credit)

2023

- Elena Rose – "El Hombre"
- Popcaan – Great Is He (deluxe edition) – 22. "Celebrate" (featuring Black Sherif)
- Stonebwoy – 5th Dimension – 03. "More Of You", 05. "Therapy"
- TXT – The Name Chapter: Freefall – 05. "Deep Down"
- NSG – AREA BOYZ – 17. "RIDE" (featuring Nines) (NSG Entertainment)

2024

- EST Gee – El Toro 2 – "Nobody Else" (featuring Static Major) (CMG/Interscope Records)
- Marley Bleu Berry – unintentional – "unintentional" (featuring Pink Sweat$) (Republic Records)
- Shenseea – Never Gets Late Here – "NEVA NEVA" (Interscope Records)
- Alesha Dixon – "Ransom" (Precious Stone Records)
- Leigh-Anne – No Hard Feelings – "Nature" (Warner Music UK)
- Amanda Reifer – Island Files – "No Man", "Dry Cry", "Someone Loves You Honey", "Colonize" (Soca remix) (Atlantic Records)
- Shenseea – "Dating SZN" (Romeich Entertainment)
- Tiwa Savage – "Forgiveness" (Empire)
- Sad Boi – Dry Cry – "Nana" (LVRN)

2025

- Collie Buddz and Stick Figure – "Good Life (2017)"
- Alesha Dixon – "Chargie" (featuring Tom Moutchi)
- Skip Marley – "In Our Sight" (Tuff Gong International/Def Jam)
- RAAHiiM and BEAM – "WiiCKEDEST" (MNRK Music Group)
- Armanii – "U A GWAN" (UnitedMasters)

=== Singles ===
2004–2009

- "Turnin' Me On" – Nina Sky
- "Father Elephant" – Elephant Man
- "Kill The Dance" – Akon featuring Kardinal Offishall (B-side of Akon's "Lonely")
- "Clothes Off" – Nina Sky
- "Blind To You" – Collie Buddz
- "Tomorrow's Another Day" – Collie Buddz
- "Layaway Love" (remix) – Notch featuring Fatman Scoop
- "Mary Jane (High Grade!)" – Collie Buddz (promo single)
- "Nande" – Minmi featuring Rudebwoy Face (Japan only)
- "Numba 1 (Tide Is High)" – Kardinal Offishall featuring Keri Hilson
- "Come Over" – Estelle featuring Sean Paul
- "Somebody Come Get Me" – Melanie Fiona (Sad Songs EP, UK only)
- "Island Boy" – Melanie Fiona (Sad Songs EP, UK only)
- "No Other Love" – John Legend featuring Estelle
- "Each Tear" – Mary J. Blige
- "Clear!" – Kardinal Offishall (2009)
- "Clear!" (remix) – Kardinal Offishall featuring Elephant Man

2010–2019

- "Favorite DJ II" – Clinton Sparks featuring Sean Paul, Ricky Blaze & Supa Dups
- "Fast Lane" – Bad Meets Evil
- "Like I Love You" – Melanie Fiona
- "Still Got It" – Tyga featuring Drake
- "Tell Me Something" – Tiara Thomas
- "Everything Reminds Me of You" – Tessanne Chin
- "I Believe" – SOJA featuring Michael Franti & Nahko
- "Your Song" – SOJA featuring Damian Marley
- "Once A Day" – Michael Franti featuring Sonna Rele
- "Controlla" – Drake
- "Too Good" – Drake featuring Rihanna
- "Not Nice" – PartyNextDoor
- "Comme moi" – Black M featuring Shakira
- "Signs" – Drake
- "Insecure" – Amara La Negra
- "Bed" – Nicki Minaj featuring Ariana Grande
- "Love Like Ours" – Estelle featuring Tarrus Riley
- "Zooted" – Becky G featuring French Montana & Farruko

=== Remixes ===
- "Amber" (Supa Dups remix) – 311 featuring Ward 21
- "Yo (Excuse Me Miss)" (reggae remix) – Chris Brown
- "Unfaithful" (reggae remix) – Rihanna featuring Shontelle
- "Umbrella" (dancehall remix) – Rihanna featuring Vybz Kartel (Japan)
- "It Don't Make Any Difference To Me" (reggae remix) – Kevin Michael featuring Collie Buddz
- "No Substitute Love" (reggae remix) – Estelle featuring Half Pint
- "No Other Love" / "Can't Be My Lover" – Cool Breeze Mixes – John Legend (2009), remix single, digital download
  - 1. "No Other Love" – John Legend featuring Estelle
  - 2. "No Other Love" (Di Genius remix)
  - 3. "No Other Love" (Curtis Lynch remix)
  - 4. "No Other Love" (Jus Bus remix)
  - 5. "Can't Be My Lover" – John Legend featuring Buju Banton
  - 6. "Can't Be My Lover" (Curtis Lynch remix)
- "Oh Yeah" (dancehall remix) – Jaicko featuring Vybz Kartel
- "Oh Yeah" (reggae remix) – Jaicko featuring Snoop Dogg
- "Raggamuffin" (remix) – Selah Sue featuring J. Cole (2012)
- "Watch Out for This (Bumaye)" (Supa Dups x Black Chiney remix) – Major Lazer featuring Busy Signal (2013)

=== Riddims ===
- Kopa Riddim (2004)
- Higher Octane Riddim (2006)
- Drumline/Timeline Riddim (2007)
- Doctor Bird Riddim (2008)

=== Compilations ===
- Reggae Gold 2003 – "No Letting Go" (remix) – Wayne Wonder/LL Cool J – remixed by Supa Dups and Joel Chin
- Reggae Gold 2005 – "Turnin' Me On" (Black Chiney reggae remix) – Nina Sky/Cham – produced by Supa Dups and Cipha Sounds
- Ragga Ragga Ragga 2005 – "Turnin' Me On" (Black Chiney reggae remix) – Nina Sky/Cham – produced by Supa Dups and Cipha Sounds
- FabricLive.24 – Diplo – "Turnin' Me On" – Nina Sky – produced by Supa Dups and Cipha Sounds
- Miami Shine – Blast Star Di Blazing Fire (2007) – "Nande" – Minmi featuring Rudebwoy Face (Japan) – produced by Supa Dups
- True Reflections...A New Beginning (2007) – Jah Cure – 09. "Jamaica", 13. "The Sound" – produced by Danja Zone/Supa Dups
- Miami Shine – Uprising (2008) – Blast Star
- Reggae Gold 2008 – "Blind To You" – Collie Buddz – produced by Supa Dups
- Reggae Gold 2008 – "Somebody Come Get Me" – Melanie Fiona (as Syren) – produced by Supa Dups, Mitchum "Khan" Chin and Willy Chin
- WWE The Music, Vol. 8 (2008) – "S.O.S." (performed by Collie Buddz; theme for Kofi Kingston) – produced by Supa Dups
- Reggae Gold 2009 – "Come Over" – Estelle featuring Sean Paul – produced by Supa Dups

=== Music videos and visualizers ===
2007

- "Blind to You" – Collie Buddz

2008

- "Come Over" – Estelle featuring Sean Paul; directed by Lil X
- "Nina" – Kardinal Offishall
- "Numba 1 (Tide Is High)" – Kardinal Offishall featuring Keri Hilson

2009

- "Clear!" – Kardinal Offishall
