= Hell: The Sequel =

EP by Bad Meets Evil
- Released: June 14, 2011
- Recorded: 2010–2011
- Genre: Hip-hop
- Length: 37:18
- Labels: Shady; Interscope
- Producers: Eminem; Mr. Porter; Paul Rosenberg; Bangladesh; Battle Roy; DJ Khalil; Havoc; Jason "JG" Gilbert; Magnedo7; Sid Roams; The Smeezingtons; Sonti "branNu" Brown; Supa Dups; Tony "56" Jackson

Eminem chronology
Recovery (2010)	Hell: The Sequel (2011)	The Marshall Mathers LP 2 (2013)

Royce da 5'9" chronology
Street Hop (2009)	Hell: The Sequel (2011)	Success Is Certain (2011)

Singles from Hell: The Sequel
- 1. "Fast Lane" Released: May 3, 2011; 2. "Lighters" Released: June 5, 2011

Hell: The Sequel is the only extended play by the American rap duo Bad Meets Evil. It was released on June 13, 2011, in some countries, by Shady Records and Interscope Records and it was released on June 14, 2011, in the United States. The EP incorporates various styles such as hardcore hip hop and horrorcore. In May 2011, the album's title and artwork was revealed. The EP features the executive producers Eminem and Mr. Porter, with production handled by Bangladesh, Sid Roams, Havoc, DJ Khalil, The Smeezingtons and Supa Dups, among others.

Hell: The Sequel contains songs such as "Welcome 2 Hell", "Above the Law" and "Loud Noises" featuring Slaughterhouse; these tracks include violent lyrical content, while trying to maintain a humorous tone. "Fast Lane", "A Kiss" and "The Reunion" feature sexual themes. "I'm on Everything" featuring Mike Epps, is a humorous song about drugs, while "Lighters" featuring Bruno Mars, and "Take from Me" focus on more serious themes such as success and music piracy and its impact on musicians.

Following the reunion of Bad Meets Evil, recording began in late 2010, when two tracks, "Living Proof" and "Echo" having leaked onto the Internet. The lead single, "Fast Lane" (which was released on May 3, 2011) was considered a highlight from the EP, while the second single, "Lighters" (featuring Bruno Mars), was met with mixed reviews. The EP debuted at number one on the Billboard 200, with first week sales of 171,000 copies. Hell: The Sequel was met with positive reviews, with critics praising the chemistry between Eminem and Royce da 5'9", as well as their technical rapping abilities.

== Background ==
I'm excited to see this project come to fruition considering the long lapse in time between when we worked before and now. We had a blast doing it and we just hope everyone enjoys it while we're working on the 'Monster' that will be the Slaughterhouse album.

— Royce da 5'9",

The duo also collaborated on their 1998 12-inch single "Nuttin' to Do" along with several other collaborations released the same year. However, as D12 rose to fame in the early 2000s, Eminem and Royce had a falling out resulting in both sides going their separate ways. The feud turned into a public rivalry between Royce and D12 and lead to Royce releasing three diss tracks aimed at the group. After disses were exchanged from both sides, Royce and fallen D12 member Proof reconciled their differences before Proof's death in 2006. Two years later, Royce was featured on D12's mixtape Return of the Dozen Vol. 1 in 2008 and also joined the group on tour in Europe and Canada. Rumors of Royce and Slaughterhouse signing to Shady Records began in late 2009 when Royce, Joell Ortiz, Crooked I, and Joe Budden appeared alongside Eminem in Drake's "Forever" video. After months of speculation and anticipation, Eminem announced in January 2011 that he had officially signed Slaughterhouse to Shady Records as the full report was made in the March cover-story for XXL Magazine.

The EP was recorded over the course of 6 months, according to an interview with Eminem on his radio channel, Shade 45. Two songs titled "Echo" and "Living Proof" were leaked onto the Internet in November 2010, causing speculation among fans about an upcoming Bad Meets Evil project: on April 25, 2011, the EP was confirmed, and on May 2, Eminem announced the EP's title Hell: The Sequel. The two songs will, however, be included as bonus tracks on the deluxe version of the album. The title is a direct reference to a previous Eminem and Royce collaboration, "Bad Meets Evil" on The Slim Shady LP as they end the song by saying "He’s Evil, and I’m Bad like Steve Seagal, against peaceful, see you in hell for the sequel."

Royce da 5'9" originally reached out to Eminem for the song "Writer's Block", for which Eminem provided the hook, and the two started working on a project together. The album features production from Mr. Porter, Havoc, Bangladesh, The Smeezingtons, Supa Dups and Sid Roams. Bruno Mars, Slaughterhouse and Mike Epps appear as guest artists.

== Singles ==
"Fast Lane" was released on May 3, 2011, as the lead single from the EP through digital distribution. It was also featured on the soundtrack to 2K Sports NBA 2K12 video game. On May 5, Vevo released an audio-only version of the track on YouTube a month and 3 days before the video's premiere. The music video, directed by James Larese, premiered June 8, 2011, on Bad Meets Evil's website and Vevo. Along with "Lighters", the song made its live performance debut at the 2011 Bonnaroo Music & Arts Festival. It was considered by many as the highlight of the festival.

"Lighters" impacted Top 40/Mainstream radio on July 5, 2011. The song features American recording artist Bruno Mars. Lighters has peaked at number four on Billboard Hot 100 list. Along with "Fast Lane", the song was performed at the Bonnaroo Music & Arts Festival. The music video was directed by Rich Lee, who previously shot Eminem's video "Not Afraid". The video premiered on Vevo on August 22, 2011.

== Critical reception ==
Professional ratings
Aggregate scores
Source	Rating
Metacritic	72/100
Review scores
Source	Rating
AllMusic	3.5/5 stars
Consequence of Sound	3/5 stars
Entertainment Weekly	B+
AllHipHop	9/10
HipHopDX	4/5 stars
IGN	8/10
PopMatters	6/10
RapReviews	7.5/10
Rolling Stone	3/5 stars
XXL	4/5 stars

Hell: The Sequel received generally positive reviews from most music critics. At Metacritic, which assigns a normalized rating out of 100 to reviews from mainstream critics, the album received an average score of 72, based on 14 reviews, which indicates "generally favorable reviews". HipHopDX gave the album a 4 out of 5, Alex Thornton quoted that "Eminem and Royce Da 5'9" are perfectly capable of standing on their own, but it's clear that even after all these years, they inspire something special in each other. They may have gone through Hell separately but it's Hip-Hop Heaven when they're together." RapReviews gave the album a 7.5 out of 10, and the author Jesal Padania praised the album for its clever lyrics stating that "this is a few tracks of two old friends having fun, egging each other on lyrically and, for the most part, it works well." Wannop also favors the chemistry between Royce and Eminem.

The EP got a B+ from Kyle Anderson of Entertainment Weekly, who focused primarily on Eminem's performance in the tracks, calling it a reminder to the world "that Eminem remains one of the best rappers alive." Even though, to Anderson, the EP is not much of an improvement from Recovery, he favors the intensity of the rapping by the pair. Anderson also noted that Royce da 5'9" is a "lyrical beast" in the album. XXL Magazine editor Carl Chery gave a positive review for Hell: The Sequel. The lyrics were praised, getting a 4 out of 5. Chery favors the change of styles throughout the EP; "I'm on Everything" is referred to as "a comical track that name checks every drug and liquor brand imaginable" while "Lighters", featuring Bruno Mars, is "another break from the typical vicious lyrical assault." AllMusic gave 3.5 stars out of 5, favoring Royce's growth and improvement as a rapper. Billboard also gave a positive review, saying that "Fast Lane" and "Lighters" were the highlights of the EP. nem for his next single Chad Grischow from IGN Entertainment gave the EP an 8 out of 10, saying, "The high-powered pair sporadically delivers on the promise of their collaboration over the nine-track EP, but for most of the effort the two take turns owning songs while the other comes off clunky." The track and lead single "Fast Lane" was favored, stating that the duo "deliver explosive, live-wire flows that make it hard to ignore how great they sound together". Grischow also favored Slaughterhouse's appearance in the album. Bruno Mars' guest appearance was criticized, however, calling it "the strangest of the set".

Music website Consequence of Sound gave a mixed review. Writer Winston Robbins claims to be disappointed to see the return of Eminem's use of crude humor, as it was negatively received in the past. He states that the EP is a "step back for both rappers." He especially dislikes the production in the EP, calling it "predictable" and occasionally "silly".

== Commercial performance ==
Hell: The Sequel debuted at number one on the US Billboard 200 chart with sales of 171,000. In its second week, the EP sold 63,000 copies, bringing its total to 234,000 copies. On August 18, 2011, the EP was certified gold by the Recording Industry Association of America for shipping over 500,000 copies. As of June 2021, the EP has sold 1 million album-equivalent units in the US, making it eligible for Platinum certification by the RIAA.

The EP also debuted at number one on the Canadian Albums Chart, selling 21,000 copies in its first week. This makes Eminem the first artist in five years to have two number one albums in a 12-month period: Hell: The Sequel and Recovery.

== Track listing ==
Standard edition
No.	Title	Writer(s)	Producer(s)	Length
1.	"Welcome 2 Hell"	Marshall Mathers; Ryan Montgomery; Kejuan Muchita; Michael Crawford	Havoc; Magnedo7^{[b]}	2:57
2.	"Fast Lane"	Mathers; Montgomery; Sly Jordan; Dwayne Chin-Quee; Jason Gilbert; Luis Resto	Supa Dups; Eminem^{[b]}; JG^{[b]}	4:09
3.	"The Reunion"	Mathers; Montgomery; Joey Chavez; Tavish Graham; Resto; Andre Young; Mark Batson; Dawaun Parker; Trevor Lawrence; Mike Elizondo; Sean Cruse	Sid Roams; Eminem^{[b]}	4:50
4.	"Above the Law"	Mathers; Montgomery; Claret Jackson; Denaun Porter; Tony Jackson; J. Williams; P. Zora	Mr. Porter	3:29
5.	"I'm on Everything" (featuring Mike Epps)	Mathers; Montgomery; Porter; T. Jackson	Mr. Porter	4:31
6.	"A Kiss"	Mathers; Montgomery; Shondrae Crawford; Sonti Brown	Bangladesh; BranNu^{[a]}	4:34
7.	"Lighters" (featuring Bruno Mars)	Mathers; Montgomery; Peter Hernandez; Philip Lawrence; Ari Levine; Roy Battle	Eminem; The Smeezingtons; Battle Roy	5:03
8.	"Take from Me"	Mathers; Montgomery; C. Jackson; Porter; T. Jackson	Mr. Porter; 56^{[b]}	3:25
9.	"Loud Noises" (featuring Slaughterhouse)	Mathers; Montgomery; Joseph Budden; Joell Ortiz; Dominic Wickliffe; Porter; T. Jackson; Resto	Mr. Porter; Eminem^{[a]}	4:20
Total length:				37:18

Deluxe edition
No.	Title	Writer(s)	Producer(s)	Length
10.	"Living Proof"	Mathers; Montgomery; Porter; T. Jackson; James Brown	Mr. Porter	3:55
11.	"Echo"	Mathers; Montgomery; Liz Rodrigues; Khalil Rahman; Erik Alcock; Danny Tannenbaum; Columbus Smith	DJ Khalil	4:55
Total length:				46:08

Notes

- ^{^[a]} indicates an additional producer
- ^{^[b]} indicates a co-producer
- "Fast Lane" features additional vocals by Sly Jordan.
- "Above the Law" and "Take from Me" feature additional vocals by Claret Jai.
- "Echo" features additional vocals by Liz Rodrigues.

Sample credits

- "The Reunion" contains a sample of "Bagpipes from Baghdad", written by Marshall Mathers, Andre Young, Mark Batson, Dawaun Parker, Trevor Lawrence, Mike Elizondo, and Sean Cruse, and performed by Eminem.
- "I'm on Everything" contains a sample from Mike Epps' stand-up comedy special Under Rated & Never Faded.
- "Loud Noises" contains a sample of Steve Carell from the 2004 film Anchorman: The Legend of Ron Burgundy.
- "Living Proof" contains a sample of "Funky Drummer (Parts 1 & 2)", written and performed by James Brown.

== Personnel ==
Credits adapted from the liner notes of the deluxe edition.

Bad Meets Evil

- Eminem – vocals and rap vocals (all tracks), production (tracks 2, 3, 7 and 9), mixing (all tracks), executive production
- Royce da 5'9" – vocals and rap vocals (all tracks)

Musicians

- Luis Resto – keyboards (tracks 1, 2, 3, 4, 6, 7 and 9)
- Tony "56" Jackson – keyboards (tracks 4, 5, 8, 9 and 10), co-production (track 8)
- Claret Jai – chorus vocals (tracks 4 and 8)
- Sly Jordan – chorus vocals (track 2)
- Justin Jozwiak – saxophone (track 9)
- Sam Beaubien – trumpet (track 9)
- Matt Martinez – trombone (track 9)
- Liz Rodrigues – chorus vocals (track 11)
- Rahki – programming (track 11)

Featured artists

- Mike Epps – chorus vocals (track 5)
- Bruno Mars – chorus vocals (track 7)
- Slaughterhouse – rap vocals (track 9)

Production

- Mr. Porter – production and mixing (tracks 4, 5, 8, 9 and 10), executive production
- Havoc – production (track 1)
- Magnedo7 – co-production (track 1)
- Supa Dups – production, drum programming and backing vocals (track 2)
- Jason Gilbert – co-production, keyboards and backing vocals (track 2)
- Sid Roams – production (track 3)
- Mr. Bangladesh – production (track 6)
- BranNu – co-production (track 6)
- Battle Roy – production (track 7)
- The Smeezingtons – production (track 7)
- DJ Khalil – production and drum programming (track 11)
- Mike Strange – recording and mixing (all tracks)
- Alex Merzin – recording (tracks 4, 5, 8 and 9)
- Asar – recording (tracks 5, 7, 9 and 10)
- Mac Attkisson – recording (track 6)
- Ari Levine – recording (track 7)
- Joe Strange – engineering assistance (all tracks)
- Brian Gardner – mastering
- Paul Rosenberg – executive production

== Charts ==
=== Weekly charts ===
Chart (2011)	Peak position
Australian Albums (ARIA)	3
Austrian Albums (Ö3 Austria)	23
Belgian Albums (Ultratop Flanders)	26
Belgian Albums (Ultratop Wallonia)	47
Canadian Albums (Billboard)	1
Danish Albums (Hitlisten)	7
Dutch Albums (Album Top 100)	25
French Albums (SNEP)	54
German Albums (Offizielle Top 100)	20
Ireland (IRMA)	15
Italian Albums (FIMI)	72
New Zealand Albums (RMNZ)	14
Norwegian Albums (VG-lista)	12
Scottish Albums (Official Charts)	7
Swiss Albums (Schweizer Hitparade)	5
Taiwan (Taiwanese Albums Chart)	14
UK Albums (Official Charts)	7
UK R&B Albums (Official Charts)	1
US Billboard 200	1
US Indie Store Album Sales (Billboard)	1
US Top R&B/Hip-Hop Albums (Billboard)	1

=== Year-end charts ===
Chart (2011)	Position
Australian Albums (ARIA)	34
Canadian Albums (Billboard)	17
Swiss Albums (Schweizer Hitparade)	89
UK Albums (OCC)	124
US Billboard 200	41
US Top R&B/Hip-Hop Albums (Billboard)	11
US Top Rap Albums (Billboard)	7

Chart (2012)	Position
US Top R&B/Hip-Hop Albums (Billboard)	40

== Certifications ==
Region	Certification	Certified units/sales
Australia (ARIA)	Platinum	70,000^{‡}
Denmark (IFPI Danmark)	Gold	10,000^{‡}
United Kingdom (BPI)	Gold	100,000^{*}
United States (RIAA)	Gold	500,000^{^}
^{*} Sales figures based on certification alone.^{^} Shipments figures based on certification alone.^{‡} Sales+streaming figures based on certification alone.

== Release history ==
Region	Date	Format	Label
Germany	June 13, 2011	CD; digital download	Universal Music
United Kingdom	June 13, 2011	CD; digital download	Shady Records; Interscope Records
United States	June 14, 2011	CD; digital download	Shady Records; Interscope Records
Australia	June 17, 2011	CD; digital download	Universal Music
Netherlands	June 17, 2011	CD; digital download	Universal Music
Japan	June 22, 2011	CD; digital download	Universal Music
Brazil	July 12, 2011	CD; digital download	Universal Music
Poland	July 24, 2011	CD; digital download	Universal Music
