= Tonight (Doja Cat song) =

2021 song by Doja Cat featuring Eve

Song by Doja Cat featuring Eve

from the album Planet Her (Deluxe Edition)
- Released: June 27, 2021
- Genre: Hip hop; R&B
- Length: 2:48
- Label: Kemosabe; RCA
- Songwriters: Amala Dlamini; Taneisha Jackson; Eve Jihan Cooper; Rob Tewlow
- Producers: Dr. Luke; Reef

"Tonight" is a song by American rapper and singer Doja Cat, featuring fellow American rapper Eve. It was released as the seventeenth track on the deluxe edition of Doja Cat's third studio album Planet Her (2021), which was released through Kemosabe and RCA Records.

The song was written by Cat and Eve themselves, alongside Taneisha Jackson and the song's co-producer, Rob "Reef" Tewlow, who produced the track alongside Dr. Luke. Upon its release, the song was received positively by music critics, who praised the track for Cat's first verse and Eve's guest appearance.

== Background and composition ==
Two days after Planet Her was released, a deluxe edition was issued with five additional tracks, including "Tonight". Doja Cat had previously hinted towards the release of "Tonight" in a YouTube interview, where she announced that a collaboration with American rapper Eve would be featuring on Planet Her. Musically, the song features a spare beat, a nylon-string plucked guitar progression, and ringing bells. "Tonight" was produced by Dr. Luke and Rob "Reef" Tewlow. The song was deemed by BrooklynVegan as having "maximalist 2000s R&B-style production".

== Critical reception ==
A Billboard article by Gil Kaufman was generally positive towards "Tonight", calling the song a "slinky duet". Kaufman wrote that "Doja comes on strong in the first verse", while "all bets are off" during Eve's verse. Jason Lipshutz, also of Billboard, wrote that the song "sounds beamed in from the best rhythmic pop playlist from 2002". Regina Cho of Revolt praised Eve's guest feature, opining that she "swoops in with her signature style effortlessly". Staff writers for BrooklynVegan were similarly approving of Eve's "bulletproof verse". XXL writers declared that the "finger-plucking acoustic guitar riff" on "Tonight" called back to rap stylings of the 2000s, and asserted that Eve sounded "just as cocksure as she did during her run with the Ruff Ryders label in the 1990s" on the song.

== Credits and personnel ==
Credits adapted from Tidal.

- Doja Cat – vocals, songwriting, production
- Eve – vocals, songwriting
- Taneisha Jackson – songwriting
- Rob "Reef" Tewlow – songwriting, production
- Kalani Thompson – assistant production, engineering
- Danielle Alvarez – assistant production
- Tyler Sheppard – engineering
- Mike Bozzi – mastering
- Clint Gibbs – mixing
- Seth Ringo – assistant engineering
