= Ruff, Rugged & Raw =

Ruff Rugged & Raw

Studio album by Double X
- Released: May 30, 1995
- Recorded: 1994–95
- Studio: Soundtrack Studios (New York, NY); Unique Recording Studios (New York, NY)
- Genre: Hip-hop
- Label: Big Beat; Atlantic
- Producer: Double X Posse; Lord Finesse

Double X chronology
Put Ya Boots On (1992)	Ruff Rugged & Raw (1995)

Singles from Ruff Rugged & Raw
- 1. "Money Talks" Released: 1995

Professional ratings
Review scores
Source	Rating
The Source	3.5/5 stars

Ruff Rugged & Raw is the second and final studio album by American hip-hop duo Double X Posse. It was released on May 30, 1995 through Big Beat/Atlantic Records. Recording sessions took place in New York City at Soundtrack Studios and Unique Recording Studios. Production was handled by the group themselves, except for one song produced by Lord Finesse. It features contributions from Arnold Parker, Charlene Gilliam, Keek, Lo Cash, Money, Sha Born, Tone The Butcher, Trife, and Warm Prince Shabazz.

A single and its accompanying Hype Williams-directed music video for the track "Money Talks" was released to promote the album.

== Track listing ==
All tracks are written by Raynard Howell Jr. and Brian Coleman, except track 3 is written with Robert Hall and track 11 is written with Roy Ayers.

No.	Title	Length
1.	"Ruff, Rugged & Raw"	4:04
2.	"Wreckin' It"	4:47
3.	"Money Talks"	3:35
4.	"Stop That Playin'"	5:03
5.	"He Asked for It"	3:40
6.	"Wicked & Wild"	4:24
7.	"Make Some Noise"	4:25
8.	"Ghetto Life"	3:56
9.	"Knock It Off Will Ya'"	4:01
10.	"F.F.F.F."	4:13
11.	"Sunshine"	4:37
12.	"8 Bars of Terror"	5:49

Sample credits

- Track 5 contains material performed by Brand Nubian.
- Track 11 contains elements from "Everybody Loves The Sunshine" written by Roy Ayers and performed by RAMP.

== Personnel ==
- Double X – producers & arrangers (tracks: 1, 2, 4–12), co-producers (track 3), mixing (tracks: 1, 2, 4, 5, 7, 9, 10, 12), executive producers
  - Raynard "SugarRay" Howell, Jr. – songwriter
  - Brian "BK" Coleman – songwriter
- Tone The Butcher – featured artist (track 6)
- Arnold Parker – featured artist (track 8)
- Charlene Gilliam – featured artist (track 11)
- Warm Prince Shabazz – featured artist (track 12)
- Sha Born – featured artist (track 12)
- Trife – featured artist (track 12)
- Money – featured artist (track 12)
- Keek – featured artist (track 12)
- Lo Cash – featured artist (track 12)
- Robert "Lord Finesse" Hall, Jr. – producer & arranger (track 3)
- Ken Lewis – recording (tracks: 1, 2, 5–8, 10, 11), mixing (tracks: 1, 5, 10)
- Troy Hightower – recording (track 3), mixing (tracks: 3, 7)
- Tony Smalios – recording (tracks: 4, 9), mixing (track 2)
- George Karras – recording & mixing (track 12)
- Chris Conway – mixing (tracks: 4, 9)
- Angela Piva – mixing (tracks: 6, 8, 11, 12)
- Rick Essig – mastering
- Rob "Reef" Tewlow – executive producer, A&R
- Tim Carter – photography
