= Jason Gilbert =

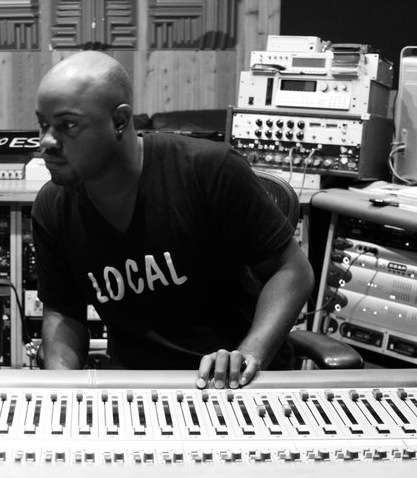
- Hopscotch Recording Studios, George Town, Grand Cayman

Background information
- Born: Jason Gilbert
- Origin: Cayman Islands
- Genres: Pop; reggae; hip hop; R&B
- Occupations: Record producer; songwriter; mixing engineer; DJ
- Label: Happy Parrot Records

Jason Gilbert, known by his nickname JG, is a Caymanian record producer, songwriter, mixing engineer and DJ. JG has produced for artists including Eminem, Bad Meets Evil, Akon, Christina Aguilera and Taio Cruz.

In 2011, Gilbert won a Grammy Award for his production work on Eminem's Recovery album.

Later in 2011, JG produced the first single off of Bad Meets Evil debut album. The single charted at #32 on the Billboard Hot 100.

JG is the founder of Happy Parrot Records and has a Master of Science in Finance degree and Law degree from Florida International University (FIU). JG is the founder and member of DJ Group (Skorch Bun It).

== Production discography ==
=== 2010 ===
- 2010: Eminem - Recovery - 5. "W.T.P"

=== 2011 ===
- 2011: Bad Meets Evil - Hell: The Sequel - 2. "Fast Lane"
- 2011: Melanie Fiona - The MF Life - 17. "Like I Love You"
- 2011: Taio Cruz - TY.O - 9."You're Beautiful"

=== 2012 ===
- 2012: Machel Montano - Double M - 4."Whine" 6."Represent"
- 2012: Christina Aguilera - Lotus - 10. "Around The World"

=== 2013 ===
- 2013: Colette Carr - Skitszo - 4. "Racking Up"

=== 2014 ===
- 2014: Sebastian Mikael - Speechless - 10. "A Beautiful Life"
- 2014: Chris Webby - Chemically Imbalanced - 15. "Stand Up"
- 2014: Remy Ma - I'm Around - 8. "Go In Go Off"

=== 2015 ===
- 2015: Genevieve - Show Your Colors - 5. "Authority"

=== 2016 ===
- 2016: KLP (musician) - "Ember"

=== 2018 ===
- 2018: Kes (band), Skorch Bun It & Sekon Sta - "Cabin Fever"
- 2018: 3LetterzNuk & Marco Foster - "I Wonder"

=== 2019 ===
- 2019: Kes (band), Skorch Bun It & Lira (singer) - "Soca For Love"
- 2019: Kiana Ledé Feat. French Montana - "Ex" (Remix)
- 2019: Cool Blaze, Skorch Bun It & Sekon Sta - "Who Pay?!"

=== 2020 ===
- 2020: Jadakiss Feat. John Legend - Ignatius - "I Know"
- 2020: JoJo - Good to Know - "Bad Habits "
- 2020: Positive Soul & Jason Gilbert - Resilient

=== 2021 ===
- 2021: Machel Montano - The Wedding Album - "Teacher" & "2U"
- 2021: Skorch Bun It - Old Ting Riddim - All Songs
- 2021: Skorch Bun It, CoolBlaze & Timeka Marshall Feat College Boy Jesse - "Anything"
- 2021: Skorch Bun It, CoolBlaze - Jogo Riddim EP
- 2021: Skorch Bun It, CoolBlaze - Verde Riddim EP
- 2021: Skorch Bun It, SugaRhe - On My Way
- 2021: Skorch Bun It, Jay III - Ride

=== 2024 ===
- 2024: Dinah Jane - "Ocean Song"

=== 2026 ===
- 2026: Akon Feat. Stephen Marley - Beautiful Day - "Just A Man"

=== Singles ===
- 2011: Bad Meets Evil - Hell: The Sequel - 2. "Fast Lane"
- 2016: KLP (musician) - "Ember"
- 2019: Kes (band), Skorch Bun It & Sekon Sta - "Cabin Fever"
- 2019: Kes (band), Skorch Bun It & Lira (singer) - "Soca For Love"
- 2019: Kiana Ledé Feat. French Montana - "Ex" (Remix)
- 2021: Skorch Bun It, CoolBlaze & Timeka Marshall Feat College Boy Jesse - "Anything"
- 2021: Skorch Bun It, Nialah Blackman - "Coffee"
- 2021: Machel Montano - The Wedding Album - "2U" (Co-Writer)
- 2026: Akon Feat. Stephen Marley - Beautiful Day - "Just A Man"
