= Signs (Drake song) =

Single by Drake
- Released: June 23, 2017
- Recorded: 2017
- Genre: Dancehall
- Length: 3:54
- Label: Cash Money; Young Money
- Songwriters: Aubrey Graham; Noah Shebib; Dwayne Chin-Quee; Jeffery Williams; Ashante Reid
- Producers: 40; Supa Dups (add.)

Drake singles chronology
"Glow" (2017)	"Signs" (2017)	"No Complaints" (2017)

"Signs" is a song by Canadian rapper Drake. It was released as a single on June 23, 2017. It was launched in tandem with Louis Vuitton's SS18 collection for Paris Fashion Week.

== Track listing ==
Digital download
No.	Title	Length
1.	"Signs"	3:57

Personnel

Adapted from TIDAL.

- 40 – production, songwriting, recording
- Supa Dups – additional production, songwriting
- Drake – songwriting, vocals
- Young Thug – songwriting
- Ashante Reid – songwriting
- Noel Campbell – mixing

== Charts ==
=== Weekly charts ===
Chart (2017)	Peak position
Australia (ARIA)	32
Australia Urban (ARIA)	5
Austria (Ö3 Austria Top 40)	50
Belgium (Ultratip Bubbling Under Flanders)	13
Belgium (Ultratip Bubbling Under Wallonia)	11
Canada Hot 100 (Billboard)	12
Canada CHR/Top 40 (Billboard)	3
Canada Hot AC (Billboard)	26
Czech Republic Singles Digital (ČNS IFPI)	41
Denmark (Tracklisten)	19
France (SNEP)	59
Germany (GfK)	50
Hungary (Stream Top 40)	36
Ireland (IRMA)	27
Italy (FIMI)	90
Netherlands (Single Top 100)	54
New Zealand (Recorded Music NZ)	36
Portugal (AFP)	27
Scottish Singles Sales (Official Charts)	30
Slovakia Singles Digital (ČNS IFPI)	44
Spain (Promusicae)	68
Sweden (Sverigetopplistan)	26
Switzerland (Schweizer Hitparade)	26
UK Singles (Official Charts)	14
UK Hip Hop/R&B (Official Charts)	3
US Billboard Hot 100	36
US Hot R&B/Hip-Hop Songs (Billboard)	14

=== Year-end charts ===
Chart (2017)	Position
Canada (Canadian Hot 100)	52

== Certifications ==
Region	Certification	Certified units/sales
Australia (ARIA)	Platinum	70,000^{‡}
Canada (Music Canada)	2× Platinum	160,000^{‡}
Denmark (IFPI Danmark)	Gold	45,000^{‡}
France (SNEP)	Gold	66,666^{‡}
Portugal (AFP)	Gold	5,000^{‡}
Sweden (GLF)	Gold	20,000^{‡}
United Kingdom (BPI)	Platinum	600,000^{‡}
United States (RIAA)	Platinum	1,000,000^{‡}
^{‡} Sales+streaming figures based on certification alone.

== Release history ==
Region	Date	Format	Label	Ref.
Worldwide	June 23, 2017	Digital download; streaming	Cash Money; Young Money	
