= Fast Lane (Bad Meets Evil song) =

Single by Bad Meets Evil

from the album Hell: The Sequel and Real Steel – Music from the Motion Picture
- Released: May 3, 2011
- Recorded: 2010–2011
- Studio: Effigy Studios (Ferndale, Michigan)
- Genre: Hip hop
- Length: 4:12
- Label: Shady; Interscope
- Songwriters: Marshall Mathers; Ryan Montgomery; Luis Resto; Sly Jordan; Dwayne Chin-Quee; Jason Gilbert
- Producers: Supa Dups; Eminem (co.); JG (co.)

Bad Meets Evil singles chronology
"Nuttin' to Do" (1999)	"Fast Lane" (2011)	"Lighters" (2011)

Audio sample
- file; help

Music video
- "Fast Lane" on YouTube

"Fast Lane" is the lead single by hip hop duo Bad Meets Evil, a group composed of Royce da 5'9" and Eminem, from their first EP Hell: The Sequel. The single was produced by Eminem, Supa Dups, and Jason "JG" Gilbert, and released on May 3, 2011 by Shady Records. It features uncredited vocals by Sly Jordan on the chorus. A music video was created by director James Larese of music video direction group Syndrome. The music video features animated visuals and kinetic typography, with cameo appearances by Mr. Porter and Slaughterhouse. Fans and critics considered it a return to Eminem's Slim Shady alter ego. Texas rapper Chamillionaire released a remix.

The song was well received compared to the rest of the EP and was considered a highlight of Hell: The Sequel. Critics favored the song for its change from Eminem's theme in Recovery. Rolling Stone called it "1999-style". Bad Meets Evil performed this song at the 2011 Bonnaroo Music & Arts Festival and the Lollapalooza music festival.

== Background ==
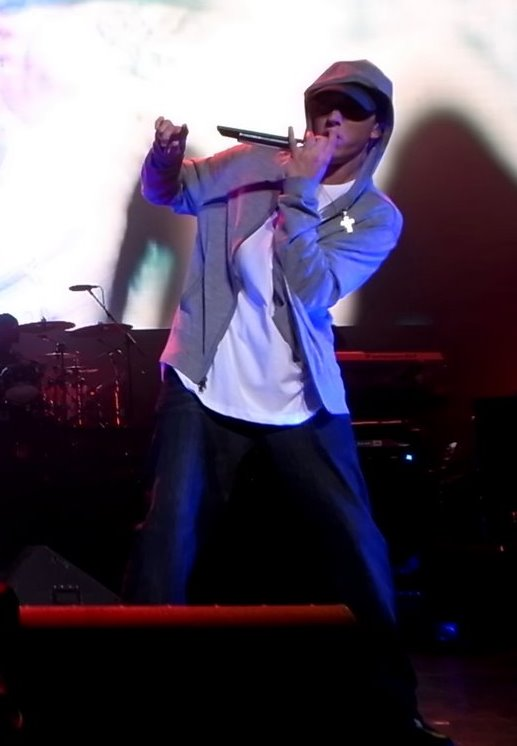
Eminem played a great role in the success of the song which included hiring a producer and a hook singer.

Bad Meets Evil first formed in 1998. The group's first single under the name was "Nuttin' to Do" / "Scary Movies". However, the group went their own separate ways in late 2002. Royce da 5'9" and Eminem have since collaborated on other songs, but not under the name "Bad Meets Evil". In late 2010, Eminem and Royce da 5'9" began collaborating as Bad Meets Evil after 11 years of inactivity within the group. "Fast Lane" was released as the lead single for their then-upcoming extended play, titled Hell: The Sequel. The song was released May 3, 2011 by Shady Records.

"Fast Lane" was recorded by Mike Strange at Effigy Studios, in Ferndale, Michigan. Recorded a few months before its release, the song was written by Eminem, and Sly "Pyper" Jordan (from "Seduction" and "Kush"), who also sings the chorus to the song. According to an interview with MTV, Eminem requested that Sly perform the chorus, after hearing Dr. Dre's "Kush". Supa Dups and Jason "JG" Gilbert produced the song and Eminem and Mike Strange mixed the song. JG and Supa Dups also sample their own vocals. According to Supa Dups, he was asked to make a beat with JG, without knowing it was for Bad Meets Evil. He said that "[They] didn't even have Eminem in mind [when they made the beat]." According to this interview with Mixtape Daily, Supa Dups had little knowledge about the project, but simply submitted the beat to Eminem:

I didn't even know the project was coming out. I didn't know what the beat was for; I just knew Eminem asked me for the files and I sent it to them. ... When I saw Eminem in L.A. for Grammy weekend, Eminem said, 'Yeah, he ripped the track.' Later on that day, I met Royce, and Royce was like, 'Yeah, download that track man. We ripped that track. That's the first single.' I was like, 'What?' But until then, I still wasn't sure.

Months after recording the song, on April 28, 2011, when it leaked onto the Internet, Supa Dups was impressed by the finished version, "I was like, 'Damn, this record is crazy.'" He was impressed by the song, lyrically, and was proud to have participated in the project. "Fast Lane" is a midwestern hip hop song. It has two main parts to the song. The first half of the four-minute song begins with a verse performed by Royce da 5'9", followed by Eminem's verse. After the chorus, the second half has two verses by each rapper, followed by the chorus for the final time.

== Critical reception ==
"Fast Lane" was received favorably by critics. Upon the release on the EP, Hell: The Sequel, Billboard editor Jason Lipshutz published a track-by-track review. According to Lipshutz, "Fast Lane" is "G-funk on steroids, with sing-song refrain breaking up crushing mic-trading bout between Royce da 5'9" and Eminem." He also referred to "Fast Lane" as one of the highlight songs of the album. Rolling Stone gave a positive review. According to Jon Dolan of Rolling Stone, "Eminem kicks 'Fast Lane' 1999-style, reconnecting with the hungry young lunatic who sounded like he only had a stanza to blow us away or it was back to the auto plant." Dolan also commented on the infamous lyric "I hope that I don't sound too heinous when I say this, Nicki Minaj, but I wanna stick my penis in your anus," saying that Eminem has been much more heinous before. According to Kyle Anderson of Entertainment Weekly, Royce da 5'9" performs extremely well on the "hard-hitting" song, even calling him a "lyrical beast". Although music website Consequence of Sound gave a rather mixed review on the EP as a whole, editor Winston Robbins favored "Fast Lane" and said that it is "hands down one of the best hip-hop tracks of 2011" and that the rapping is "second to none".

== Music video ==
Kinetic typography is used in the video to illustrate lyrics, as seen here with Eminem.

The music video was directed by James Larese of collective group Syndrome, a group that also directed videos for two other Eminem songs: "3 a.m." and "Crack a Bottle". A 40-second video teaser was released on May 27, 2011, on Eminem's YouTube channel, which shows the part of the video during the first time the chorus plays, confirming Sly Jordan's appearance in the video and the use of cartoon animation. In an interview with Bootleg Kev, Royce da 5'9" revealed that a lot of the ideas for the animated visuals featured in the music video were Eminem's ideas. The video was first expected to release on May 31, 2011. However, the date was delayed. The video premiered on June 8, 2011, at noon EST on VEVO and Bad Meets Evil's official website.

The music video features animated visuals of the lyrics and kinetic typography of some lyrics, with the duo rapping in a warehouse-like setting. Royce da 5'9" and Eminem both interact with the animations and occasionally hold and use them as actual objects. When transitioning between rappers, Eminem and Royce push each other out when it is their turn. Notable scenes include a cartoon blonde girl who gets 'drowned' by Eminem, inside a fish-bowl and then decapitated. Another scene includes Bad Meets Evil riding a green animated car, crashing into several obstacles, during the chorus. Sly Jordan appears in the video, singing the chorus. The music video features cameo appearances from American rapper and producer Mr. Porter of D12, who lip syncs part of the chorus, and members of hip hop supergroup Slaughterhouse near the end of the video. Near the end of the video, Royce and Eminem try to stand in front of each other for attention. The video ends with them being pushed out of the way by the Bad Meets Evil logo. The video became notable for its humorous content. There's an "Director's Cut" version to the music video in where instead of holding words when talking about Nicki Minaj Eminem can be seen as holding a sausage and a hot dog bun.

== Live performances ==
Eminem and Royce da 5'9" made their debut live performance as Bad Meets Evil for "Fast Lane" and "Lighters" at the 2011 Bonnaroo Music & Arts Festival. According to James Montgomery of MTV, "what stood out the most about Em[inem]'s performance was the sheer tenacity with which he attacked it." Other than Royce, he was also accompanied by his hypeman Mr. Porter of D12 and performed wearing a black Bad Meets Evil T-shirt, under a black hoodie. The duo's performance was complemented by the "Fast Lane" music video playing in the background. "Fast Lane" was performed with Porter on the second day of Lollapalooza 2011, which took place in Chicago. The song was referred to by Gil Kaufman of MTV as a "low-rider anthem". Prior to the performance, Eminem changed into the Bad Meets Evil T-shirt.

== Remixes and appearances in other media ==
Texas rapper Chamillionaire recorded a remix of the song which was released on May 8, 2011. The song was not officially released to iTunes, however. The remix features two added verses by Chamillionaire between Eminem's and Royce Da 5'9"'s verses; one before the first time the chorus plays, and another verse after the chorus. He also replaces Sly Jordan with a modified chorus with different lyrics. The remix is five and a half minutes long.

The track was featured on both the soundtracks of the 2011 film Real Steel, and on 2K Sports' NBA 2K12. The track was also used for HBO's Entourage season 8 trailer and the Extended First Look trailer for Fast & Furious 6. The song was featured in the Final Fantasy XV trailer "Ride Together'

== Credits and personnel ==
- Eminem – co-producer, songwriter and audio mixer
- Royce da 5'9" – songwriter
- Supa Dups – songwriter, producer, drum programming, vocal arrangement and additional backing vocals
- Jason "JG" Gilbert – songwriter, co-producer, keyboards, additional backing vocals
- Mike Strange – recording and audio mixer
- Sly "Pyper" Jordan – songwriter and additional chorus vocals
- Luis Resto – songwriter and additional keyboards

Credits adapted from Hell: The Sequel album digital booklet.

== Charts ==
Chart (2011)	Peak position
Canada (Canadian Hot 100)	50
New Zealand (RIANZ)	35
UK Singles (The Official Charts Company)	66
US Billboard Hot 100	32

== Certifications ==
Region	Certification	Certified units/sales
Brazil (Pro-Música Brasil)	Gold	30,000^{‡}
United Kingdom (BPI)	Silver	200,000^{‡}
United States (RIAA)	Gold	500,000^{*}
^{*} Sales figures based on certification alone.^{‡} Sales+streaming figures based on certification alone.
