= Lighters (song) =

2011 single by Bad Meets Evil featuring Bruno Mars

Single by Bad Meets Evil featuring Bruno Mars

from the album Hell: The Sequel
- Released: June 14, 2011
- Studio: Various: Effigy Studios (Ferndale, Michigan); Isolation Studios (Detroit, Michigan); Levcon Studios (Los Angeles, California)
- Genre: Alternative hip-hop; pop rap
- Length: 5:04 (album version)
- Label: Shady; Interscope
- Songwriters: Marshall Mathers; Ryan Montgomery; Peter Hernandez; Philip Lawrence; Ari Levine; Roy Battle
- Producers: Eminem; The Smeezingtons; Battle Roy

Bad Meets Evil singles chronology
"Fast Lane" (2011)	"Lighters" (2011)

Bruno Mars singles chronology
"Talking to the Moon" (2011)	"Lighters" (2011)	"Marry You" (2011)

Music video
- "Lighters" on YouTube

"Lighters" is a song by American hip hop duo Bad Meets Evil, a group composed of Royce da 5'9 and Eminem, featuring American singer-songwriter Bruno Mars. It was written by Bad Meets Evil, along with Mars, Philip Lawrence, Ari Levine, the latter three as the Smeezingtons, and Roy Battle. The production was handled by all aforementioned names, except Royce. It was released on June 14, 2011, by Shady and Interscope Records, being later serviced to mainstream radio in the United States by the two latter labels along with Aftermath Entertainment as the second single from their first EP, Hell: The Sequel (2011). After writing and recording their own verses for the song, Eminem and Royce da 5'9" met Mars in Los Angeles, and the singer's vocals were added after minor adjustments were done by him and Eminem to the original cut.

"Lighters" is an alternative hip hop song with elements of soul and synthpop music. Music critics noted it for being musically different among other tracks on Hell: The Sequel, with some praising and others criticizing the change in style. Mars' performance on the chorus was praised, while the duo was met with criticism for their lyrics, which regard one's downfalls, comebacks and conveying a message of genuine support and celebration by the accomplishment of dreams. The song reached the top ten of several countries, including number two in New Zealand, number four in Canada and the United States, and number ten in Switzerland and the United Kingdom. It has been certified two times platinum by the Recording Industry Association of America (RIAA) and three times platinum by the Australian Recording Industry Association (ARIA).

The accompanying music video was filmed in Los Angeles, California, in July 2011 and it was directed by Rich Lee. It features both Royce and Eminem, the former in a prison cell, finding a way to escape by discovering a way through a door compartment, and the latter in a living room discovering a trap door and a connected basement under the floor, respectively. Throughout the entire visual, Mars is singing while playing an upright piano. "Lighters" was performed at several music festivals, including the 2011 Bonnaroo Music & Arts Festival and Lollapalooza. "Lighters" was nominated for International Video of the Year – Group at the 2012 MuchMusic Video Awards and was one of the winners of Most Performed Song at the 2012 ASCAP Pop Music Awards. In 2022, the song was included on Eminem's second greatest hits album Curtain Call 2.

== Background and release ==
When speaking to Canadian music magazine Exclaim!, American rapper Royce da 5'9" confessed that "Lighters" was originally intended to be featured on his fifth solo studio album, Success Is Certain (2011). It was solely produced by Battle Roy. After Royce presented the track to American rapper Eminem, he was inspired to write his verse which prompted Royce to write his the day afterwards. Bad Meets Evil then flew to Los Angeles, where Bruno Mars heard the song. Along with Eminem, the latter made minor changes to the musical arrangement. Subsequently, Mars's vocals were added on the original cut. The singer joked saying that he got on the song after beating Eminem on a rap battle.

"Lighters" was written by Eminem and Royce as Bad Meets Evil, Mars, Philip Lawrence and Levine, the latter three a production and songwriting team, the Smeezingtons, and by Battle Roy, all of whom, except Royce, also produced the track. It was recorded at Effigy Studios in Ferndale, Michigan, by Mike Strange, and at Isolation Studios and Levcon Studios, both located in Los Angeles, California, by Asar and Levine, respectively. Roy and Joe Strange engineered the single. Luis Resto provided additional keyboards for the record. Mike Strange and Eminem mixed the single. It was mastered by Brian Gardner at Bernie Grundman Mastering. On May 25, 2011, when the album track listing of Hell: The Sequel was announced, "Lighters" was publicly revealed to feature Mars. The track leaked on June 2, 2011.

"Lighters" was first released by Shady and Interscope Records to digital download on June 14, 2011. It was added to contemporary hit radios stations lists in the United States as the second single on July 5, 2011, by Shady and Interscope Records, along with Aftermath Entertainment. Ten days later, the single was issued for radio airplay in Italy by Warner Music Group. Later, on September 19 of the same year, it was sent to contemporary hit radio in the United Kingdom. In 2022, the song was included on Eminem's second greatest hits album Curtain Call 2.

== Composition and lyrical interpretation ==
"Lighters"
A 28-second song sample, in which Mars finishes the soul-influenced hook and Eminem begins his verses about coming back from addiction and being one of the best rappers.

"Lighters" is mainly an alternative hip hop track. It has also been described as a blend of hip-hop and pop, further incorporating parts of a synth ballad. The record differs from the hardcore hip hop style used in other songs by Bad Meets Evil in the EP, as it takes influences from synthpop ballad and soul music, mainly on the track's chorus. The song opens with piano chords while Mars sings with his "warm" and "pleasing" pop and soul chorus. The singer finishes his verse saying, "All I want to see is a sky full of lighters". Afterwards, the bass drops along with synth chords and Eminem starts to rap with his "crescendos build up to fist-pumping levels", being followed by Royce.

The song has a length of over five minutes on the album version, making it the longest song on Hell: The Sequel. Its main structure is backed by strings and piano, which throughout the track are combined with bass drum and synths The A.V. Club's Genevieve Koski found similarities between it and B.o.B's "Nothin' on You". Jason Newman of MTV said that the track is unlike the duo's "late-'90s string of dark, misanthropic singles". The song was composed in common time and in the key of C major with a tempo of 92 beats per minute. Bad Meets Evil's and Mars's vocals range spans from the low note of C4 to the high note of C5.

Lyrically, the recording shows one's downfalls and comebacks while spreading a message to the "haters". It also conveys a message of genuine supporting and celebration through the accomplishment of dreams and by overcoming obstacles. During his verses, Eminem refers to becoming a legend in the rap community and his recovery from addiction as he did on his seventh studio album, Recovery (2010). Royce raps about cars, Eminem's greatness and how he struggled to reach the top. Mars verses show "genuine humanity". The song's usage of profanity has attracted negative attention from critics. Royce da 5'9" responded to the criticism of "Lighters" and according to him, he and Eminem wanted to be versatile with the EP by making a couple of personal records. He further explained in another interview, "People who don't like listening to straight-up, raw, rappitty-rap lyrics. One joint to show versatility."

== Critical reception and accolades ==
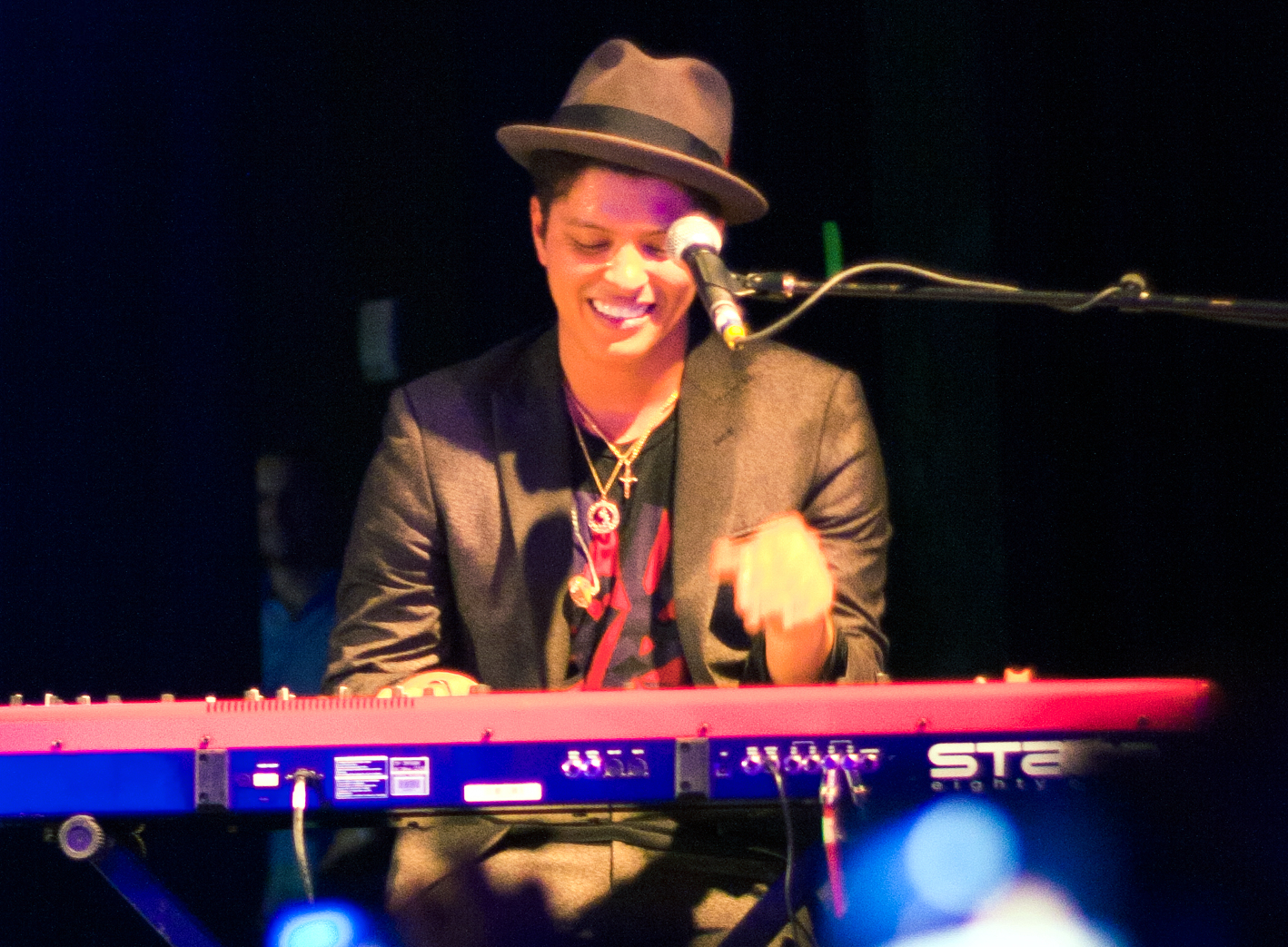
Mars's (pictured) appearance and vocal delivery on the song's chorus was complimented by music critics.

"Lighters" received mixed reviews by most music critics. Most of them commented on the different style of the song when compared to other songs on Hell: The Sequel, which was met with both positive and negative reception.

Both Idolator's reviewer Becky Bain and Rob Markman from MTV News spoke about the new song after it leaked on June 2, 2011. Bain found the track to be "saccharine sweet", as well as, "warm-and-fuzzy". She carried on saying that it was an "inspirational" and "anthemic" track and concluded that Mars knows how to "rockin’ a hook". Markman had a positive opinion regarding "Lighters". He wasn't surprised to hear Eminem's performance, "It's hard to imagine a time when Eminem wasn't regarded as one of rap's elite". Not only did he comment on Royce da 5'9"'s verse, "The gritty Detroit MC recalls his own battles to the top, referencing doubters at every turn", but also noticed that the track was "inspirational", addictive and made to be sent to the radio.

Magazine XXL commented on the single, saying it is "inspirational" and set to be on heavy rotation during the summer time and "another break from the typical vicious lyrical assault." About.com's Bill Lamb gave a generally positive review, awarding the song four out of five stars, naming it "an engaging, soulful pop hip hop blend", by having humorous lyrics and "Mars' soulful, memorable rap", but went on to mention that the track "sounds a bit schmaltzy at times." The recording's chorus was praised by Nathan Rabin of The A.V. Club. Rabin also added that it wouldn't give a "welcome relief from the claustrophobic darkness of the rest of the album."

In a mixed review, Billboard editor Jason Lipshutz published a track-by-track review of each song on the album. He thought that the single did not fit in with the rest of Hell: The Sequel, but alone, is a good song, "[The] track doesn't fit with EP, but Em's effortless confidence carries the celebratory anthem." Chad Grischow of IGN gave a shared a similar opinion, calling the song odd and uncommon. Grischow did not favor the influences of "gooey synthpop" and soul fusion genres. However, the critic appreciated the "inspirational verses" from Eminem and Royce and summarized, "In the end, this brief look at the duo's skills does not fully deliver what you expect, but still leaves you wanting to hear more." While exploring the Billboard charts on their segment at The A.V. Club, writers Genevieve Koski and Steven Hyden, commented on "Lighters". Koski said that the single shared some similarities with "Nothin' on You", which also featured Mars. Despite noticing the contrast between the rap verses and the hook, she focused her attention on the various elements of the recording which "are each uplifting in their own way" and awarded it a B−.

On the other hand, Hyden gave the song a harsh critic calling it the, "absolute worst in pop music right now". He criticized Eminem for spitting in his verses, Mars for singing a "melodramatic chorus" and the type of music the rapper, Eminem, was embracing dubbing it, "maudlin power balladry". He gave the record an F. In a negative review, David Jeffries of Allmusic said that "the glossy 'Lighters' feels more like a Bruno Mars track than Detroit diesel." Consequence of Sound's reviewer Winston Robbins gave a rather negative review on "Lighters". Robbins believes that Mars's vocal delivery in the chorus does not fit into a rap song and would have done better on a solo record or with another artist. David Amidon from music website PopMatters said that "Lighters" was the only disappointing recording of the 11 tracks on the EP deluxe edition and "it's easy to press the skip button if you’d like to."

At the 2012 ASCAP Pop Music Awards it was one of the winners of Most Performed Songs.

== Commercial performance ==
"Lighters" debuted on the Billboard Digital Songs chart at number eight, before the single's release, while it entered the Billboard Hot 100 at number 16. Two weeks after, it moved up to number 33 on the Billboard Hot 100, after dropping to number 44 on the previous week. The recording further moved up to number 17 on the Billboard Hot 100 on the subsequent week and to number 10 the week after, giving Mars his sixth top ten hit and Bad Meets Evil's first. On the issue dated August 10, 2011, "Lighters" entered the bottom of the top five on the Billboard Hot 100 and held the Airplay Gainer honor. The song eventually reached its Billboard Hot 100 peak at number four. "Lighters" spent 20 weeks on the Hot Rap Songs chart, peaking at number six. On the Pop Songs chart, the track peaked at number two, and was on the chart for 20 weeks, with it further topping the Rhythmic Songs. As of September 2012, "Lighters" has sold 2,208,000 copies in the United States, which led it to be certified two times platinum by the Recording Industry Association of America (RIAA). On the issue date of September 10, 2011, the single reached a peak at number four on the Canadian Hot 100.

In Denmark, the single entered at number 25, in the beginning of July 2011, and later peaked at number 18. It spent 13 weeks on the country's chart. "Lighters" didn't enter France's single chart until August 13, 2011, when it debuted at number 85. It lasted seventeen weeks, and reached a peak position of number 11 on September 24, 2011. In Ireland, the song rose from its 25th position to a number 11 peak. In the United Kingdom, the song debuted at number 37 on June 25, 2011. It rose to number 30 the week after, but left the chart, six weeks later. However, it re-entered the chart on August 28, 2011. On October 8, 2011, the song peaked at number 10. On August 6, 2011, the track peaked at number 13 in its fourth week on the Dutch Top 40. On Norway's VG-lista, "Lighters" reached its peak of number nine in its third week, leaving the chart four weeks later. In Scotland, "Lighters" peaked at number nine and spent fifteen weeks on that country's respective chart.

"Lighters" entered the Australian Singles Chart at number 30 and rose to number 19 the following week; it peaked at number 17 at the end of July 2011. The song was certified three times platinum by the Australian Recording Industry Association (ARIA). In New Zealand, the single debuted and peaked at number two, making this the track's highest debut and peak position. September 26, 2011, marked the song's 14th and final chart appearance, at number 36. The song was certified platinum by the Recorded Music NZ (RMNZ). It sold 445,708 copies in South Korea by the end of 2011.

== Music video ==
=== Background and concept ===
Filming sessions for an accompanying music video for "Lighters" began on July 20, 2011, in Los Angeles, California. It was conducted by American music video and commercial director Rich Lee, who previously shot the "Not Afraid" visual with Eminem. Mars told MTV that the video would "leave fans inspired" and that it is "a very beautiful [video]. I haven't even seen it yet, but I think it's going to be beautiful." Not revealing any specific details about the video clip, he jokingly added, "I'm doing handstands, and I'm juggling naked." The video was uploaded to VEVO on August 22, 2011.

=== Development and synopsis ===
Royce da 5'9" rapping in an underground utility tunnel illuminated by red highway flares.

The video begins with Mars singing while playing an upright piano. Eminem, who is laying on a couch in an untidy living room while wearing a white T-shirt and red baggy pants, subsequently picks up a notepad with lyrics and begins to rap his verse. He discovers a trap door on the floor and climbs down a ladder, and then finds himself in a utility tunnel with pipes, while red highway flares illuminate the setting. He lights a flare to navigates through a series of tunnels. While Mars sings the chorus once again in the same setting as shown in the beginning, Eminem continues to search through the tunnels.

Royce begins rapping in a prison cell, until he finds a poster and peels it off the wall to find a door compartment, a reference to 1994 drama film The Shawshank Redemption. He crawls through it and finds himself in the tunnel. Royce lights a flare to help navigate through the system. As Mars sings the bridge, the two rappers find their way out of the tunnels, through a manhole which leads them to a field where Mars sings. As the sun starts to set, couples, along with Bad Meets Evil, gather to see a large group of rising sky lanterns aglow. Beats by Dr. Dre headphones are advertised in the video and one couple gathers in front of a Chrysler 300. As the video reaches its conclusion, the setting gets dark and Mars sings the last lines.

=== Reception ===
James Montgomery from MTV News wrote, "It's a stirring image, for sure, and yes, you can probably read plenty into it." Consequence of Sound's Chris Coplan explained that "all three men emerge to exactly what they’d been singing for: a sky full of decorative lamps."

Becky Bain from Idolator said, "Bruno jams out on his 88 keys while the 'King Of Hip-Hop' and his Bad Meets Evil cohort Royce da 5′9″ go underground, emerging to the sight of thousands of lanterns lighting up the sky." Kyle Anderson of Entertainment Weekly gave a mixed review, criticizing the lack of sufficient lighting in the video. However, he praised the final scene of glowing lanterns, naming it "the most compellingly beautiful thing to appear in an Eminem video."

The music video was nominated for the category International Video of the Year – Group at the 2012 MuchMusic Video Awards.

== Live performances ==
Eminem and Royce da 5'9" made their debut live performance as Bad Meets Evil for "Fast Lane" and "Lighters" at the 2011 Bonnaroo Music & Arts Festival. They were accompanied by Eminem's hypeman from D12, Mr. Porter, with Mars not attending the concert. The live show was complemented with animated lighters displayed on the background screen, while the duo wore Bad Meets Evil T-shirts and black hoodies. Eminem also sported camouflage shorts. In the beginning of the show, Eminem asked the audience to hold their lighters, if they had brought one, which most of them did. The performance was widely praised, with James Montgomery from MTV confessing, "It's the same renewed vigor Eminem has displayed on his most-recent efforts."

News reporter Adam Graham from The Detroit News favored the concert, commenting on its effect on the audience, "Royce joined his partner-in-rhyme on stage for two songs, 'Fast Lane' and 'Lighters,' the latter of which lit up the humongous field in front of the [stage] in a sea of Bic lighters." The Hollywood Reporter wrote, "Bonnaroo's crowd may be a hippie enclave, but you wouldn't have known it Saturday night." Mars joined Bad Meets Evil to perform "Lighters" on the second day of Lollapalooza 2011, which took place in Chicago, with them being once again accompanied by Mr. Porter.

Piet Levy from USA Today named the show "the evening's highlight". During it, many fans held up Bic lighters, and lit their cell phones and cameras. Leah Greenblatt from Entertainment Weekly called the show "a set heavy on hard-spat hits". Gil Kaufman from MTV News thought the chorus was "a feathery pop sheen to the harder-edge". Mars also brought a silver guitar that he occasionally played.

"Lighters" was included on Eminem's set list at V2011 (V Festival), which took place in Staffordshire and Chelmsford on August 20 and 21, 2011, respectively. In 2013, Bad Meets Evil performed the song on Pukkelpop. Occasionally, Mars also sung the track solo on his first tour, The Doo-Wops & Hooligans Tour (2010–12).

== Personnel ==
Credits adapted from the liner notes of Hell: The Sequel.

- Eminem – lead vocals, songwriting, production, mixing
- Royce da 5'9" – lead vocals, songwriting
- Bruno Mars – lead vocals, songwriting
- Philip Lawrence – songwriting
- Ari Levine – songwriting, recording
- The Smeezingtons – production
- Roy Battle – songwriting, production, engineering
- Luis Resto – additional keyboards
- Asar – recording
- Joe Strange – engineering assistant
- Mike Strange – recording, mixing
- Brian Gardner – mastering

== Charts ==
=== Weekly charts ===
List of chart positions
Chart (2011)	Peak position
Australia (ARIA)	17
Austria (Ö3 Austria Top 40)	41
Belgium (Ultratop 50 Flanders)	23
Belgium (Ultratop 50 Wallonia)	32
Canada Hot 100 (Billboard)	4
Canada CHR/Top 40 (Billboard)	2
Canada Hot AC (Billboard)	28
Denmark (Tracklisten)	18
France (SNEP)	11
Germany (GfK)	26
Ireland (IRMA)	11
Lebanon (Lebanese Top 20)	2
Netherlands (Dutch Top 40)	13
Netherlands (Single Top 100)	17
New Zealand (Recorded Music NZ)	2
Norway (VG-lista)	8
Scottish Singles Sales (Official Charts)	9
South Korea International Chart (Gaon)	2
Sweden (Sverigetopplistan)	18
Switzerland (Schweizer Hitparade)	10
UK Singles (Official Charts)	10
UK Hip Hop/R&B (Official Charts)	3
US Billboard Hot 100	4
US Hot Latin Songs (Billboard)	22
US Hot R&B/Hip-Hop Songs (Billboard)	75
US Hot Rap Songs (Billboard)	6
US Pop Airplay (Billboard)	2
US Rhythmic Airplay (Billboard)	1

=== Year-end charts ===
List of chart positions
Chart (2011)	Position
Australia (ARIA)	68
Brazil (Crowley)	30
Canada (Canadian Hot 100)	40
Netherlands (Dutch Top 40)	69
Netherlands (Single Top 100)	85
Sweden (Sverigetopplistan)	97
Switzerland (Swiss Hitparade)	65
UK Singles (Official Charts Company)	88
US Billboard Hot 100	34
US Mainstream Top 40 (Billboard)	22
US Rhythmic (Billboard)	11

List of chart positions
Chart (2012)	Position
Brazil (Crowley Broadcast Analysis)	44

== Certifications ==
List of certifications
Region	Certification	Certified units/sales
Australia (ARIA)	3× Platinum	210,000^{‡}
Brazil (Pro-Música Brasil)	Gold	30,000^{‡}
Denmark (IFPI Danmark)	Gold	45,000^{‡}
New Zealand (RMNZ)	Platinum	15,000^{*}
Sweden (GLF)	Platinum	40,000^{‡}
United Kingdom (BPI)	Gold	400,000^{‡}
United States (RIAA)	2× Platinum	2,208,000
^{*} Sales figures based on certification alone.^{‡} Sales+streaming figures based on certification alone.

== Release history ==
List of release history, showing region(s), date(s), format(s) and label(s)
Region	Date	Format	Label	Ref.
Various	June 14, 2011	Digital download	Shady; Interscope	
United States	July 5, 2011	Contemporary hit radio	Shady; Interscope; Aftermath Entertainment	
Italy	July 15, 2011	Radio airplay	Warner Music Group	
United Kingdom	September 19, 2011	Contemporary hit radio	Shady; Interscope	

== See also ==
- List of Billboard Hot 100 top 10 singles in 2011
- List of Billboard Rhythmic number-one songs of the 2010s
