= Ignatius (album) =

Studio album by Jadakiss
- Released: March 6, 2020
- Genre: Hip hop
- Length: 46:00
- Labels: SoRaspy; D-Block; Def Jam
- Producers: Ayo n Keyz; BlameRonnie; Bryan-Michael Cox; Buckwild; Buda and Grandz; E Major; Hitmaka; Jason Gilbert; Jimmy Dukes; Justen Robinson; Khardier Da God; Loshendrix; Money-Matt; Noc; Pitchshifters; Poobs; POSTA; S. Dot; Shroom; Smiley's People; Supa Dups

Jadakiss chronology
| Friday on Elm Street (2017) | Ignatius (2020) |

Professional ratings
Aggregate scores
| Source | Rating |
|---|---|
| Metacritic | 82/100 |
Review scores
| Source | Rating |
| Albumism | 4.5/5 stars |
| AllMusic | 4/5 stars |
| CLASH | 8/10 |
| Earmilk | 5/5 stars |
| HipHopDX | 3.7/5 |
| RapReviews | 8/10 |

Ignatius is the fifth studio album by American rapper Jadakiss. It was released through SoRaspy, D-Block Records, and Def Jam Recordings on March 6, 2020, making it Jadakiss's first solo release since 2015's Top 5 Dead or Alive. The album features guest appearances from 2 Chainz, Chayse, DeJ Loaf, Emanny, John Legend, Millyz, Nino Man, Pusha T, Rick Ross and Ty Dolla Sign. It was preceded by the release of the singles "Me" in 2019, "Kisses to the Sky" in January 2020, and "Hunting Season" in February 2020. It was A&R'd by Steven "Steve-O" Carless and executive produced by Ignatius "IcepicJay" Jackson. The album received positive reviews from critics, getting general rating of 82 on Metacritic, becoming his best rated album.

== Background ==
The album is named for the Ruff Ryders Entertainment A&R and record producer Ignatius "IcepickJay" Jackson, who died in 2017 from cancer. He is featured on the center of the album's cover art.

== Release ==
Initially planned for a February 28, 2020 release date, the album was released on March 6, 2020. Jadakiss delayed the album's release out of respect due to the death of Pop Smoke, a 20-year-old American rapper who was murdered on February 19 by masked gunmen during a home invasion in the Hollywood Hills.

== Track listing ==
| No. | Title | Writer(s) | Producer(s) | Length |
|---|---|---|---|---|
| 1. | "Pearly Gates" | Jason Phillips; Shaun Thomas; Daniel Garcia; Francis Ubiera; Jimmy Dukes; Matthew Morales; Eric Marrell Smith; Jim Tyree Salter III | S. Dot; Buda and Grandz; Jimmy Dukes; Money-Matt; Smiley's People | 3:16 |
| 2. | "Huntin Season" (featuring Pusha T) | Phillips; Terrence Thornton; Thomas; Garcia; Ubiera; Marvin Sills; Tim Schoegje | S. Dot; Buda and Grandz; Khardier Da God; Shroom | 4:38 |
| 3. | "Keep It 100" | Phillips; Thomas; Garcia; Ubiera; Christopher Diaz; Jesus Fernandez; Leo Graham; Raphael Oliveira | S. Dot; Buda and Grandz; Poobs; Noc | 4:11 |
| 4. | "Catch & Release" | Phillips; Justin Stein; Thomas; Garcia; Ubiera; Carlos Muñoz | S. Dot; Buda and Grandz; Poobs; Loshendrix | 4:35 |
| 5. | "Me" | Phillips; Bryan-Michael Cox; Robert Bryson | Bryan-Michael Cox | 3:45 |
| 6. | "Anna Mae Skit" | | | 0:28 |
| 7. | "NYB (Need Your Best)" (featuring Ty Dolla Sign) | Phillips; Tyrone Griffin, Jr.; Austin Owens; Christian Ward; James Foye; Kenneth Edmonds; Stanley Bristol | Ayo n Keyz; Hitmaka | 3:19 |
| 8. | "Angel's Getting Pedicured" (featuring 2 Chainz) | Phillips; Tauheed Epps; Thomas; Garcia; Ubiera; Diaz; Fernandez; Anthony Graham | S. Dot; Buda and Grandz; Poobs; POSTA | 4:11 |
| 9. | "Kisses to the Sky" (featuring Rick Ross and Emanny) | Phillips; William Roberts; Emanny Salgado; Thomas; Garcia; Ubiera; Brian Bennett; Ronnie Young Jr. | S. Dot; Buda and Grandz; BlameRonnie; E Major | 5:08 |
| 10. | "My Condolences Skit" | Phillips; Thomas | S. Dot | 0:42 |
| 11. | "Gov't Cheese" (featuring DeJ Loaf, Nino Man and Millyz) | Phillips; Deja Trimble; Smiley Abney; Myles Lockwood; Anthony Best; Justen Robinson | Buckwild; Justen Robinson | 5:18 |
| 12. | "I Know" (featuring John Legend) | Phillips; John Stephens; Dwayne Chin-Quee; Jason Gilbert | Supa Dups; JG | 4:03 |
| 13. | "Closure" (featuring Chayse) | Phillips; Lauren Seymour; Garcia; Ubiera; Fernandez; Mads Moeller; Thor Noergaard | S. Dot; Buda and Grandz; Poobs; Pitchshifters | 2:56 |

Notes

- "Catch & Release" includes uncredited vocals from Justin Jesso.
- "Me" contains a sample from "Give Me Your Love" by Peabo Bryson.

== Charts ==
Chart performance for Ignatius
| Chart (2020) | Peak position |
|---|---|
| US Billboard 200 | 31 |
| US Top R&B/Hip-Hop Albums (Billboard) | 19 |
