= Scary Movie =

2000 film by Keenen Ivory Wayans

- Theatrical release poster
- Directed by: Keenen Ivory Wayans
- Written by: Shawn Wayans; Marlon Wayans; Buddy Johnson; Phil Beauman; Jason Friedberg Aaron Seltzer
- Produced by: Eric L. Gold; Lee R. Mayes; Bo Zenga
- Starring: Jon Abrahams; Carmen Electra; Shannon Elizabeth; Anna Faris; Kurt Fuller; Regina Hall; Lochlyn Munro; Cheri Oteri; Dave Sheridan; Marlon Wayans; Shawn Wayans
- Cinematography: Francis Kenny
- Edited by: Mark Helfrich
- Music by: David Kitay
- Production companies: Wayans Bros. Entertainment; Gold/Miller Productions; Brad Grey Pictures
- Distributed by: Dimension Films
- Release date: July 7, 2000 (United States)
- Running time: 88 minutes
- Country: United States
- Language: English
- Budget: $19 million
- Box office: $278 million

Scary Movie is a 2000 American parody film directed by Keenen Ivory Wayans and written by Marlon and Shawn Wayans (who both also star), alongside Buddy Johnson, Phil Beauman, Jason Friedberg and Aaron Seltzer. The film stars Jon Abrahams, Carmen Electra, Shannon Elizabeth, Anna Faris, Kurt Fuller, Regina Hall, Lochlyn Munro, Cheri Oteri, and Dave Sheridan. The film, a parody of the slasher film genre, most notably the I Know What You Did Last Summer and Scream franchises, follows a group of teenagers who accidentally hit a man with their car, dump his body in a lake, and swear to secrecy. A year later, someone wearing a Ghostface mask and robe begins hunting them one by one.

Dimension Films released Scary Movie in 2,913 theaters in the United States on July 7, 2000. The film grossed $278 million worldwide on a $19 million budget and is the highest-grossing in the series. It was the ninth-highest-grossing film of the year in the United States, grossing $157 million domestically and $121 million internationally. The film grossed $42.3 million in its opening weekend setting the record for biggest R-rated opening weekend at the time. The film is the first installment in the Scary Movie film series. The film received mixed reviews from critics, and later spawned five sequels, starting with Scary Movie 2 in 2001.

== Plot ==
On Halloween night, Drew Decker receives a threatening phone call while home alone. Chased outside by somebody dressed as Ghostface, she is stripped to her bra and panties before being stabbed in the breast, removing one of her silicone implants. Her father, who is distracted by receiving fellatio from her mother, accidentally hits her with his vehicle, and she looks at her murderer just before she is fatally stabbed.

Cindy Campbell meets up with her boyfriend Bobby Prinze and her friends, Brenda Meeks, Ray Wilkins, Greg Phillippe, Buffy Gilmore, and Brenda's stoner brother Shorty. Cindy is being pressured by Bobby to have sex as a couple for the first time. News teams, including hack reporter Gail Hailstorm, converge on the school because of Drew's murder. Gail seduces Buffy's intellectually disabled brother, Special Officer Doofy, to elicit information from him.

While in class, Cindy notices the killer watching her from outside before receiving an ominous note and realizes Drew was murdered exactly one year after she and her friends accidentally killed a man. After football practice, Greg finds a photo of his small penis on his locker saying "I KNOW" on it. Believing Ray took it, he nearly fights him.

Cindy tells her friends about the note, attempting to convince them to tell the police, but Greg beats her instead, fearing imprisonment for the murder of the previous year. At Buffy's beauty pageant that evening, the killer murders Greg in plain view, while the audience mistakes her pleas for help as part of her dramatic reading. Buffy eventually wins the pageant and forgets Greg.

The killer attacks Cindy while home alone but retreats when she contacts the police. Bobby arrives and is arrested after a cellphone, knife, and gloves fall out of his pocket. As Cindy spends the night at Buffy and Doofy's, she receives a call from the killer.

The following day, Bobby is released from jail. Buffy is beheaded by the killer with a cleaver. That night, Gail and her cameraman Kenny go to a makeout spot to get a murder on camera. After they film the killer murdering teenager Heather, he chases them into the woods and murders Kenny. Gail later gives a snot-filled apology to Kenny's family, a parody of a scene from The Blair Witch Project.

Later that night, Ray and Brenda go to the movies to see Shakespeare in Love, where he is stabbed through his ear in a bathroom stall through a glory hole. The killer chases Brenda, but angry movie patrons, weary of her talking during the film and her obnoxious behavior, stab her to death to silence her as revenge for spoiling several films.

Meanwhile, Cindy has a house party, hoping for safety in numbers. One of her friends, Tina, is killed while getting beer from the garage. During the party, Cindy finally decides to go upstairs with Bobby and have sex. The killer gets stoned with Shorty and his friends in the basement, but accidentally kills all but Shorty. The killer later stabs Bobby and disappears. Cindy gets a gun from a drawer and Bobby follows. Shorty comes up from the basement warning about the killer, but Bobby shoots him. Ray arrives on the scene, still alive and revealing himself as Bobby's partner.

Bobby and Ray confront Cindy in the kitchen, announcing they will only kill her and her father, and that they are merely copying the real killer. Bobby shares that he resented Cindy for not consummating their relationship, making him sexually explore with Ray. He admits to being gay, while Ray denies it. The plan backfires when Ray stabs Bobby repeatedly out of anger because his favorite show, The Wayans Bros., has been canceled after five seasons without getting a final episode. The killer abruptly arrives and stabs Ray, so Cindy kicks him out a window, employing moves from The Matrix. However, the killer vanishes before the police arrive, to Cindy's dismay.

At the police station, Cindy and the sheriff discover the killer was Doofy and not David Keegan, the man whom Cindy and her friends accidentally killed a year earlier. He was faking his disability and has escaped with Gail Hailstorm after removing his disguise. Finding his discarded backpack with his Ghostface mask and knife in the street, Cindy begins screaming but is run over by a car as the sheriff walks away.

== Cast ==
- Anna Faris as Cindy Campbell
- Marlon Wayans as Shorty Meeks
- Jon Abrahams as Bobby Prinze
- Dave Sheridan as Doofy Gilmore / The Killer (voice)
- Regina Hall as Brenda Meeks
- Shawn Wayans as Ray Wilkins
- Shannon Elizabeth as Buffy Gilmore
- Lochlyn Munro as Greg Phillippe
- Cheri Oteri as Gail Hailstorm
- Kurt Fuller as Sheriff Burke
- Carmen Electra as Drew Decker
- Rick Ducommun as Neil Campbell
- Jayne Trcka as Miss Mann
- Kelly Coffield Park as Teacher
- David L. Lander as Principal 'Squiggy' Squiggman
- Andrea Nemeth as Heather
- Marissa Jaret Winokur as Tina
- Keenen Ivory Wayans as Slave
- Tanja Reichert as Miss Congeniality
- Ted Cole as Older Man In Theater
- James Van Der Beek as Dawson Leery (uncredited)
- China Shavers as Shorty’s Date (uncredited)

== Production ==
Shawn Wayans conceived a movie that would parody 1990s teen-slasher movies, and he along with Marlon Wayans, and writing partners Buddy Johnson and Phil Beauman wrote a script with the reported working title of Last Summer I Screamed Because Halloween Fell on Friday the 13th. At the same time, screenwriters Jason Friedberg and Aaron Seltzer (who created the 1996 James Bond spoof Spy Hard) were working on an idea for a movie called Scream If I Know What You Did Last Halloween. Dimension Films, a subsidiary of Miramax Films, bought both, and gave the Friedberg/Seltzer script to the Wayans brothers. The Writers Guild of America gave writing credits to both groups, infuriating the Wayans, who argued that none of Friedberg and Seltzer’s work was used in the finished product.

Anna Faris had graduated from the University of Washington and planned to live and work in London, but decided instead to go to Los Angeles for a year. There she auditioned for the film and booked her first acting job. Keenen had rejected many other actresses, and was willing to take the chance on Faris despite her lack of experience because of her instinctual performance. He said: "She had this natural innocence and was funny." Jenny McCarthy and Melissa Joan Hart auditioned for the part of Drew Decker, before Carmen Electra was cast. Aaliyah was offered the role of Brenda but declined out of respect for fellow R&B singer Brandy, feeling that the Scary Movie character parodied Brandy's role in I Still Know What You Did Last Summer (1998).

Principal photography took place from August 16, 1999 to October 18, 1999, primarily in British Columbia, Canada.

=== Parodies ===
Much of the humor of Scary Movie relies upon specific references to other contemporary films. Roger Ebert remarked in his review that "to get your money's worth, you need to be familiar with the various teenage horror franchises." The two films on which the script is most heavily based are Scream (1996) and I Know What You Did Last Summer (1997) (both written by Kevin Williamson), using the general narrative arcs of both films, and featuring comedic recreations of key scenes. The backstory in which the teenagers are responsible for accidentally killing a man following a beauty pageant recalls the same plot point in I Know What You Did Last Summer. Major references to Scream include the identity of Ghostface and the murder of Drew Decker in the opening scene, a reference to the opening scene of Scream in which the same thing occurs to the character of Casey Becker, played by Drew Barrymore. Additionally, the characters of Scream and I Know What You Did Last Summer are mirrored in the film, and the title "Scary Movie" was originally the working title for the project that would eventually become Scream. At one point the title of this film was going to be "Scream If You Still Know What I Did Last Halloween". Although the Ghostface mask and costume was a replica, the original costume from the Scream series was used in the scene where Cindy notices the killer outside of the school.

Many scenes and jokes parody or reference other films outside the horror film genre. The fight between Cindy and the killer heavily mimics The Matrix, particularly its use of bullet time. The final scene, in which Doofy stops feigning his disability and drives away with Gail, is a takeoff of the final scene of The Usual Suspects. When asked about her favorite horror movie, Drew answers "Kazaam" due to Shaquille O'Neal's acting. Cindy becomes aggressive and roars "Say my name!" during sex with Bobby, similar to the sex scene between Michelle and Jim in American Pie. The movie theater scene shows a screening of Shakespeare in Love and a trailer for a fictitious sequel to Amistad titled Amistad II with elements of Titanic also appears in the movie theater scene. When Gail and her cameraman are attacked by the killer, she partakes in a parody of the famous scene in The Blair Witch Project where Hailstorm records an apology to her friends' parents.

The film also makes other pop culture references beyond the scope of film, such as the parodied version of Sarah Michelle Gellar's character Helen Shivers in I Know What You Did Last Summer being named Buffy, which is a reference to her character in Buffy the Vampire Slayer. Others include a brief references to Dawson's Creek, Candid Camera, Big Momma's House, Candyman, Friday the 13th and a parody of the Whassup? ad campaign by Budweiser.

The tagline for the movie's poster was "No Mercy. No Shame. No Sequel." When Scary Movie 2 was released a year later, the tagline for the sequel was "We Lied."

Films parodied

- Scream (1996): Main parody
  - Scream 2 (1997): Brenda's death parodies Maureen Evans' in the opening theater scene, and Cindy's chase scene references CiCi Cooper throwing a bicycle down the stairs, as well as the killer falling over a chair from Sidney Prescott's chase scene.
  - Scream 3 (2000): Post video of Shorty giving advice what to do in a sequel.
- I Know What You Did Last Summer (1997): Main parody
- The Sixth Sense (1999): Character of Shorty says "I see dead people".
- The Blair Witch Project (1999): Gail Hailstorm references famous "I'm so scared" scene.
- Halloween (1978): The scene in which Cindy spots the killer outside her classroom window is a direct parody to the scene from Halloween, in which Laurie Strode first spots Michael Myers outside her classroom window.
- Friday the 13th (1980): Killer says "ch ch ch ah ah ah", a famous sound effect in the Friday the 13th franchise.
- The Shining (1980): Killer says "Redrum".
- The Matrix (1999): Climax references several fight scenes.
- The Usual Suspects (1995): Ending parodies the twist ending.
- Psycho (1960): Bobby references the Norman Bates line when he says "we all go a little crazy sometimes", imitating Billy Loomis in Scream.
- Candyman (1992): Ray tells Cindy that she "branded [Bobby] the Candyman" after Bobby was released from jail.

== Music ==
Scary Movie: Music That Inspired the Soundtrack?

Soundtrack album to Scary Movie by various artists
- Released: July 4, 2000
- Recorded: 1999–2000
- Genres: Hip-hop, alternative rock
- Length: 55:07
- Label: TVT Soundtrax
- Producers: Adam Schlesinger; Chris Collingwood; Flavor Flav; Justin Trugman; Mike Denneen; Rob "Reef" Tewlow

Professional ratings
Review scores
Source	Rating
AllMusic	3/5 stars

The compilation album entitled Scary Movie: Music That Inspired the Soundtrack? was released on July 4, 2000, through TVT Soundtrax and consists of a blend of hip-hop and rock music. In 2004, the soundtrack peaked at number 26 on the Official Soundtrack Albums Chart in the UK.

Track listing

No.	Title	Writer(s)	Producer(s)	Length
1.	"Too Cool for School" (performed by Fountains of Wayne)	Chris Collingwood; Adam Schlesinger	Chris Collingwood; Adam Schlesinger; Mike Denneen	2:27
2.	"The Inevitable Return of the Great White Dope" (performed by Bloodhound Gang)	Jimmy Franks		3:53
3.	"Stay" (performed by Radford)	Jonathan R. Mead		3:56
4.	"The Only Way to Be" (performed by Save Ferris)	Brian Mashburn; Monique Powell		3:20
5.	"My Bad" (performed by Oleander)	Thomas Flowers; Doug Eldridge; Ric Ivanisevich; Fred Nelson Jr.		3:22
6.	"Punk Song #2" (performed by Silverchair)	Daniel Johns		2:46
7.	"Everybody Wants You" (performed by The Unband)	Billy Squier		4:11
8.	"Superfly" (performed by Bender)	Kent Boyce; Tim Cook; Matt Scerpella		2:55
9.	"I Wanna Be Sedated" (performed by Ramones)	Jeffrey Ross Hyman; John Cummings; Douglas Colvin		2:31
10.	"Scary Movies (Sequel)" (performed by Royce da 5'9")	Ryan Montgomery; Marshall Mathers; Rob Tewlow	Rob "Reef" Tewlow	3:46
11.	"All About U" (performed by 2Pac featuring Top Dogg, Nate Dogg and Dru Down)	Tupac Shakur; Bruce Washington; Yafeu Fula; Johnny Jackson; Nathaniel D. Hale; Calvin Broadus		4:34
12.	"I Want Cha" (performed by Black Eyed Peas)	Will Adams; Jaime Gomez; Allan Pineda; George Pajon		4:37
13.	"What What" (performed by Public Enemy)	William J. Drayton	Flavor Flav	5:03
14.	"Feel Me" (performed by Rah Digga, Rampage and Rock)	Rashia Fisher; Roger McNair; Jahmal Bush; Justin Trugman; Mike Wilder	Justin Trugman	3:49
15.	"I'm the Killer (Killer Rap)" (performed by Lifelong featuring Incident)	Sherwin Charles; Ivan Norwood; James Carter; Clark Campbell; Jeff Gullo; Mark Helfrich; David Sheridan; Marlon Wayans; Shawn Wayans		3:57
Total length:				55:07

== Release ==
=== Home media ===
Scary Movie was released on DVD and VHS on December 12, 2000, by Disney's Buena Vista Home Entertainment (under the Dimension Home Video banner). In 2007, it was released on Blu-ray.

In late 2005, the Weinstein brothers left Disney-owned Miramax to form The Weinstein Company, and took the Dimension Films label with them. Disney/Miramax retained ownership of the films previously released under the Dimension banner, with this including all of Dimension's releases between their 1992 foundation and September 2005. Disney then sold off Dimension's former parent label Miramax to private equity firm Filmyard Holdings in 2010, and Qatari company beIN purchased Miramax from them in 2016. In 2020, ViacomCBS (now known as Paramount Skydance) bought a 49% stake in Miramax from beIN. This deal gave Paramount the rights to Miramax's library and Dimension's pre-October 2005 library, and the rights to release future projects based on Dimension/Miramax properties such as Scary Movie. Paramount later made Scary Movie available on their streaming service Paramount+, and reissued the film on Blu-ray in 2020.

== Reception ==
=== Box office ===
Scary Movie opened theatrically in the United States and Canada on July 7, 2000, on 2,912 screens, and debuted at number one at the US box office, grossing $42,346,669 during its opening weekend. It went on to break Air Force One's record for having the biggest opening weekend for any R-rated film. Additionally, Scary Movie generated the second-highest opening weekend of 2000, behind Mission: Impossible 2. The film ultimately grossed $157 million in the United States and Canada, surpassing Good Will Hunting as Miramax's highest-grossing film in that market. It grossed $121 million in other markets, for a worldwide gross of $278 million.

=== Critical response ===
Metacritic review
breakdown (unweighted)

Positive
16 (50%)
Mixed
8 (25%)
Negative
8 (25%)

Scary Movie received mixed reviews from critics. On review aggregator Rotten Tomatoes, the film holds an approval rating of 52% based on 122 reviews, with an average score of 5.50/10. The website's critical consensus reads, "Critics say Scary Movie overloads on crudity and grossness to get its laughs." On Metacritic, the film received a score of 48 based on 32 reviews, indicating "mixed or average" reviews. Audiences polled by CinemaScore gave the film an average grade of B− on an A+ to F scale.

Joe Leydon of Variety said that the film was "unbounded by taste, inhibition or political correctness" and that "the outer limits of R-rated respectability are stretched, if not shredded". Leydon concluded the film is "practically guaranteed to make you laugh until you're ashamed of yourself". Roger Ebert gave the film three stars out of four, saying it "delivers the goods", calling the film a "raucous, satirical attack on slasher movies". However, Ebert was critical of the film for not being as innovative as other films, saying it lacked "the shocking impact of Airplane!, which had the advantage of breaking new ground".

Bob Longino of The Atlanta Journal-Constitution felt that the film's crude humor detracted from the film, saying that Scary Movie "dives so deep into tasteless humor that it's a wonder it landed an R rating instead of an NC-17". Other reviewers, such as A.O. Scott of The New York Times, argued that the jokes were "annoying less for their vulgarity than for their tiredness". Scott remarked "Couch-bound pot smokers, prison sex, mannish female gym teachers, those Whassssup Budweiser commercials—hasn't it all been done to death?"

Peter Howell of The Toronto Star wrote that the film "doesn't just push the gross-out envelope, it folds, spindles, mutilates and mails it to your mama". He adds, however, that "Scary Movie has a nasty side to it that negates much of the humour. Many jokes are just plain sexist, racist, homophobic, violent... and not funny. A scene where a woman is knocked to the ground by an angry man who then proceeds to brutally kick her is sickening to watch. The film's frequent use of profanity also seems gratuitous, even by these standards, but that may be beside the point. By the time you realize the four-letter word count is running high, the plot itself has become repetitious and forced."

== Sequel ==
A sequel, titled Scary Movie 2, was released in 2001.

== See also ==
- List of films featuring fictional films
- List of films set around Halloween
- Student Bodies (1981) — A parody of horror movies
- Shriek If You Know What I Did Last Friday the 13th (2000) — A parody of horror movies inspired by Scary Movie
- Stan Helsing (2009) — A parody of horror movies
- Fear and Loathing in Las Vegas (1998) — A film which experienced similar issues with WGA crediting dispute.
