= Foreva =

Foreva – Comércio de Calçado, S.A.
- Industry: Shoes
- Founded: 1984
- Headquarters: Portugal
- Website: www.foreva.pt

Foreva – Comércio de Calçado, S.A. is a Portuguese company that manufactures shoes. It is one of the most important and well-known shoe companies of Portugal, and its stores are mostly located in shopping malls all over the country, including the Azores and Madeira.

It is part of the Portuguese group Kyaia, since 2005. Its suppliers and factories are mainly in Northern Portugal, in particular Guimarães.

== History ==
Foreva was founded in 1984. Its first store opened in Lisbon. The company expanded from then on, manufacturing more and opening new shops over the years.

However, it began to have various financial problems around the beginning of the 2000s (decade). In 2005, with 47 shops, the company was acquired by the Kyaia group. It corresponded to an investment of over 7 million euros.

According to Fortunato Frederico, a businessman in charge of the Kyaia group, he bought a true "Titanic sinking boat" and "went through a lot to put it floating back again".

Nevertheless, already in 2010, the company began to improve its financial situation and make profit.

== Production ==
Foreva's main centre of production has been, from the start, in the city of Guimarães (North of Portugal). In 2010, a new Kyaia group factory opened in Paredes de Coura, also in the same region of the country.

The Kyaia group employs over 500 factory workers.

== See also ==
- List of companies of Portugal
