= Put Ya Boots On =

Studio album by Double X Posse
- Released: August 11, 1992
- Recorded: 1991–1992
- Genre: Hip hop
- Length: 59:58
- Label: Big Beat
- Producer: Double X Posse; T-Ray

Double X Posse chronology
Put Ya Boots On (1992)	Ruff, Rugged & Raw (1995)

Singles from Put Ya Boots On
- 1. "Head Cracker" Released: June 18, 1992; 2. "Not Gonna Be Able to Do It" Released: October 1, 1992

Professional ratings
Review scores
Source	Rating
Entertainment Weekly	C+
The Source	3.5/5 stars

Put Ya Boots On is the debut studio album by American hip hop group Double X Posse. It was released on August 11, 1992, via Big Beat Records.

== Track listing ==
Credits are adapted from AllMusic.

No.	Title	Writer(s)	Producer(s)	Length
1.	"Put Ya Boots On" (featuring Sha Born and Warm Prince Shabazz)	Raynard Howell, Jr.; Brian Coleman; Sha Born; Warm Prince Shabazz; Todd Ray; Wilson Turbinton	T-Ray	4:07
2.	"The Headcracker"	Howell, Jr.; Coleman; James Brown	MC Sugar Ray; BK The Original Bootsmoker	4:59
3.	"The Pure Thing"	Howell, Jr.; Coleman	MC Sugar Ray; BK The Original Bootsmoker	4:05
4.	"Somethin' Funky Ta Step To"	Howell, Jr.; Ray	T-Ray	3:39
5.	"Get Ya Props Up"	Howell, Jr.; Coleman	MC Sugar Ray; BK The Original Bootsmoker	4:04
6.	"Executive Class"	Howell, Jr.; Michael Hepburn	MC Sugar Ray; Adonis White; Peter Barnes	4:12
7.	"Girls Be Frontin'"	Howell, Jr.; Coleman; Ray; Jimmy Lindsay; Patrick Patterson; Steve Scipio	T-Ray	4:12
8.	"Not Gonna Be Able to Do It"	Howell, Jr.; Ray	T-Ray	4:00
9.	"Addicted to the Game"	Howell, Jr.; Coleman	MC Sugar Ray; BK The Original Bootsmoker	3:35
10.	"Ruffneck" (featuring Super C)	Howell, Jr.; Coleman; Super C; Allen Toussaint	MC Sugar Ray; BK The Original Bootsmoker	4:29
11.	"Executive Class II"	Howell, Jr.; Patrick Harvey	The LG Experience	3:49
12.	"We Got It Goin' On"	Howell, Jr.; Coleman; Art Neville; George Porter Jr.; Joseph Modeliste; Leo Nocentelli	MC Sugar Ray; BK The Original Bootsmoker	3:47
13.	"School of Hard Knocks" (featuring Warm Prince Shabazz)	Howell, Jr.; Coleman; Warm Prince Shabazz; Alan Gorrie; Hamish Stuart; Malcolm Duncan; Owen McIntyre; Roger Ball; Steve Ferrone	MC Sugar Ray; BK The Original Bootsmoker	4:21
14.	"Get Mines or Get Naked"	Howell, Jr.; Coleman	MC Sugar Ray; BK The Original Bootsmoker	2:53
15.	"We Got It Goin' On (Remix)"	Howell, Jr.; Coleman; Neville; Porter Jr.; Modeliste; Nocentelli	MC Sugar Ray; BK The Original Bootsmoker	3:46
Total length:				59:58
