= Nuttin' to Do =

Single by Bad Meets Evil
- B-side: "Scary Movies"; "I'm the King"
- Released: October 1, 1998
- Recorded: 1998
- Genre: Midwest hip hop; hardcore hip hop
- Length: 34:42
- Label: Game Recordings
- Songwriter(s): Marshall Mathers; Ryan Montgomery; Rob Tewlow
- Producer(s): Reef

Bad Meets Evil singles chronology
"Nuttin' to Do" (1998)	"Fast Lane" (2011)

"Nuttin' to Do" / "Scary Movies" is the first single by hip hop duo Bad Meets Evil, composed of Detroit rappers Eminem and Royce da 5'9", released on October 1, 1998 by Game Recordings. Four years later, Bad Meets Evil would break up and Eminem would go on to work with D12 and Royce Da 5'9" would work on solo projects. Royce took "Nuttin' to Do" for his album Build and Destroy, and he also featured the sequel to "Scary Movies" as a solo song on it called "Scary Movies (The Sequel)". "Scary Movies" was also featured on the soundtrack to the 2000 film Scary Movie. Porn actresses Crystal Knight and Midori are featured on the cover.

== Track listing ==
This track listing is confirmed by iTunes. It features a bonus track by Royce entitled "I'm the King".

12" vinyl

Side A
No.	Title	Writer(s)	Producer(s)	Length
1.	"Nuttin' to Do" (radio version) (performed by Bad Meets Evil)	Marshall Mathers; Ryan Montgomery; Robert Tewlow	Reef	4:14
2.	"Nuttin' to Do" (street version) (performed by Bad Meets Evil)	Mathers; Montgomery; Tewlow	Reef	4:14
3.	"Nuttin' to Do" (instrumental)	Mathers; Montgomery; Tewlow	Reef	4:14

Side B
No.	Title	Writer(s)	Producer(s)	Length
1.	"Scary Movies" (radio version) (performed by Bad Meets Evil)	Marshall Mathers; Ryan Montgomery; Robert Tewlow	Reef	3:45
2.	"Scary Movies" (street version) (performed by Bad Meets Evil)	Mathers; Montgomery; Tewlow	Reef	3:45
3.	"Scary Movies" (instrumental)	Mathers; Montgomery; Tewlow	Reef	3:45

CD

No.	Title	Writer(s)	Producer(s)	Length
1.	"Nuttin' to Do" (street version) (performed by Bad Meets Evil)	Marshall Mathers; Ryan Montgomery; Robert Tewlow	Reef	4:17
2.	"Scary Movies" (street version) (performed by Bad Meets Evil)	Mathers; Montgomery; Tewlow	Reef	3:47
3.	"I'm the King" (street version) (performed by Royce da 5'9")	Montgomery; Alan Maman	The Alchemist	3:43
4.	"Nuttin' to Do" (radio version) (performed by Bad Meets Evil)	Mathers; Montgomery; Tewlow	Reef	4:17
5.	"Scary Movies" (radio version) (performed by Bad Meets Evil)	Mathers; Montgomery; Tewlow	Reef	3:50
6.	"I'm the King" (radio version) (performed by Royce da 5'9")	Montgomery; Maman	The Alchemist	3:25
7.	"Nuttin' to Do" (instrumental)	Mathers; Montgomery; Tewlow	Reef	4:17
8.	"Scary Movies" (instrumental)	Mathers; Montgomery; Tewlow	Reef	3:47
9.	"I'm the King" (instrumental)	Montgomery; Maman	The Alchemist	3:32

== Charts ==
Chart (2000/01)	Peak position
UK Singles Chart	182^{1} 63^{2}
U.S. Billboard Rap Songs	32^{1}

^{1} "Nuttin' to Do"
^{2} "Scary Movies"
