= Bad Meets Evil =

American hip hop duo

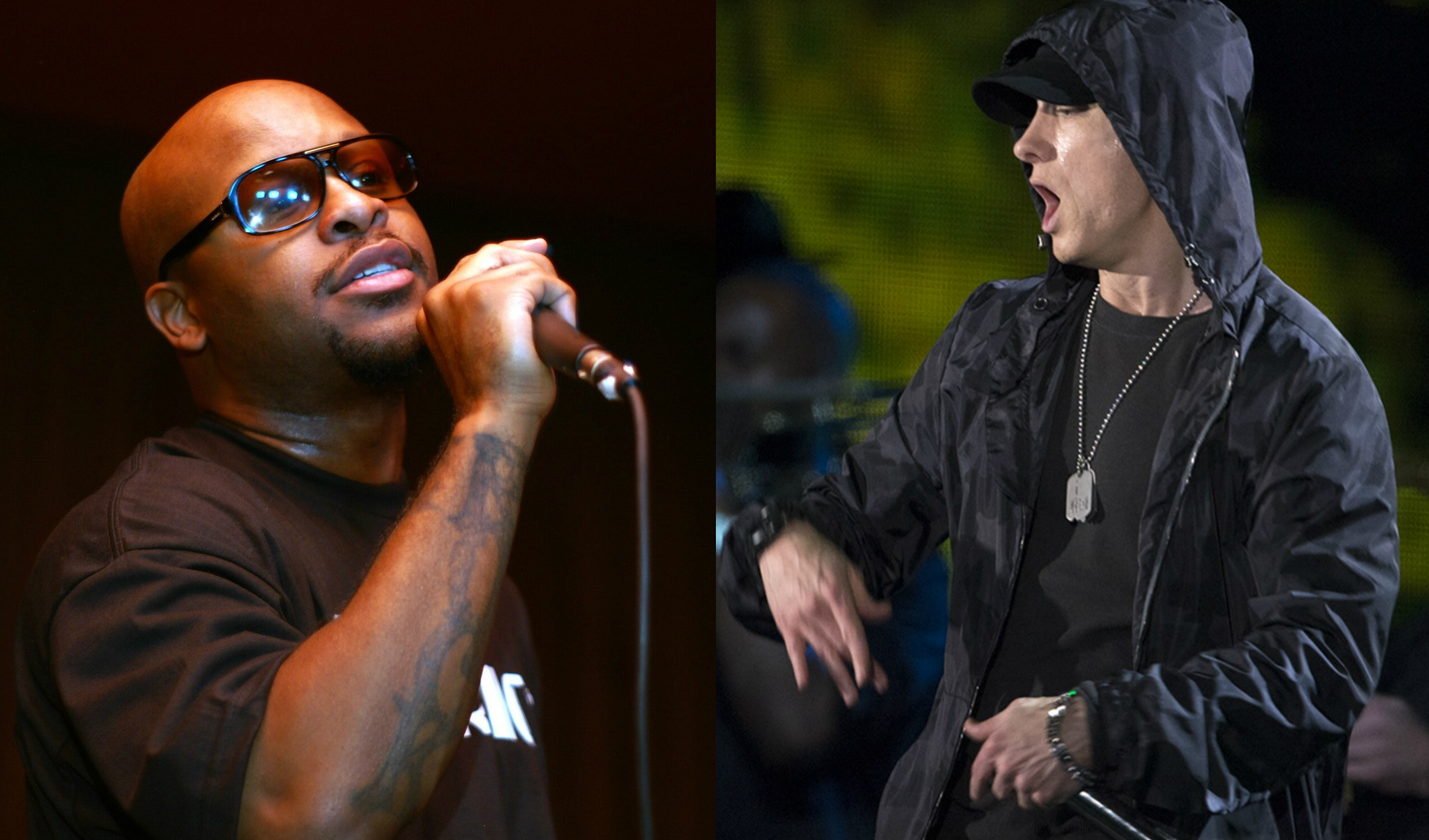
- Royce da 5′9″ and Eminem

Background information
- Origin: Detroit, Michigan, U.S.
- Genre: Hip hop
- Years active: 1997–2002, 2010–present
- Labels: Shady; Interscope; Game
- Members: Bad (Royce da 5'9); Evil (Eminem)

Bad Meets Evil is an American hip hop super duo composed of Detroit-based rappers Royce da 5′9″ ("bad") and Eminem ("evil"). Formed in 1997, the duo's name comes from the namesake song from Eminem's The Slim Shady LP (1999), which featured Royce da 5'9". They debuted the same year with the release of the double single, "Nuttin' to Do" and "Scary Movies", the latter of which was part of the soundtrack to the 2000 horror comedy parody film Scary Movie. A decade later, the duo reunited to release an extended play (EP) to critical and commercial success.

The duo broke up after a feud between Royce and the members of Eminem's group D12. The feud ended when Proof, a D12 member and a mutually close affiliate of both rappers, was killed in April 2006. After Royce's supergroup Slaughterhouse signed to Eminem's Shady Records, a reunion of Bad Meets Evil followed with the EP Hell: The Sequel (2011), which reached number one on the U.S. Billboard 200 and was certified platinum by the Recording Industry Association of America (RIAA). The EP's lead single, "Fast Lane" peaked at number thirty-two on the Billboard Hot 100, while its second single, "Lighters" (featuring Bruno Mars), peaked at number four on the same chart.

The duo returned for the 15-year anniversary album for Shady Records, Shady XV (2014), for "Vegas", and again in 2015 to record two tracks for the boxing film Southpaw, titled "All I Think About" and "Raw". The duo reunited for the song "Not Alike" on Eminem's album Kamikaze (2018). Eminem was also featured on Royce's song "Caterpillar" on his album Book of Ryan (2018). Royce was featured on three tracks on Eminem's album Music To Be Murdered By (2020): "You Gon' Learn", "Yah Yah" and "I Will". On the song "Godzilla" from the same album, Eminem confirms that the duo are still active by rapping ("pack heat, but it's black ink Evil half of the Bad Meets Evil, that means take a back seat").

== Music career ==
Official Bad Meets Evil logo

=== Formation and subsequent break-up ===
Eminem met Royce da 5'9" in 1997 when Royce was opening for singer Usher at the Palladium. Eminem and Royce da 5'9", became quick friends before Eminem's rise to fame, and collaborated on the track which led to the duo's foundation, "Bad Meets Evil", for Eminem's 1999 major label debut The Slim Shady LP. The duo's first work, a 1998 double-single, which was originally recorded in 1997, consisting of "Nuttin' to Do" and "Scary Movies", achieved respectable chart success, peaking at 36 on the Hot Rap Songs chart, while the latter peaked at 63 on the UK Singles Chart. A year later, the song "Scary Movies" was featured on the soundtrack of the horror comedy parody film Scary Movie.

"Renegade" was originally a song featuring Eminem recorded for Royce's debut studio album Rock City (2002), but Royce's verses were later replaced with Jay-Z's for his 2001 album The Blueprint. Jay-Z contacted Eminem for a collaboration and beat while the song was being made. Limited in time for production, Eminem sent Jay-Z the beat for "Renegade" with approval from Royce. However, Eminem was still featured on Royce's Rock City album, on the title track.

Dr. Dre heard one of Royce's mix tapes through Eminem, deciding to sign him to Aftermath Entertainment. Eminem secured him a ghostwriting position on Dre's second studio album, 2001. After his manager Kino stated: "I've seen Em sit Dre down like a pupil and coach him on rhymes" on a phone interview, Dr. Dre requested that Royce cut ties with his manager. Royce refused to fire his manager, thus his relationship with Dre ended.

After Royce turned down Eminem's offer to join his Anger Management Tour as a hype man, Proof, member of Eminem's band D12 and his best friend, also a good friend of Royce's, took the place. Later, Royce wanted to continue working with Eminem, who was busy working with D12, which led Royce to believe that D12 was "souring" his relationship with Eminem. A feud with a series of diss tracks followed, resulting in the duo's break up.

=== Reunion ===
In 2011, Royce's rap group Slaughterhouse signed to Eminem's founded label Shady Records. This led to a reunion of Bad Meets Evil with the debut extended play Hell: The Sequel, released on June 14, 2011, after 11 years of inactivity in the group. A chart success, it peaked at number one on the Billboard 200 and was certified gold by the Recording Industry Association of America (RIAA) and the Australian Recording Industry Association (ARIA).

"Fast Lane" was released on May 3, 2011, as the lead single. It was recorded by Mike Strange at Effigy Studios (Ferndale, Michigan). Recorded a few months before its release, the song was written by Eminem, Royce da 5'9" and Sly "Pyper" Jordan, who also sings the chorus to the song with additional vocals from Denaun Porter. Eminem requested that Sly perform the chorus, after hearing Dr. Dre's hit single "Kush". Supa Dups and Jason "JG" Gilbert produced the song; Eminem and Mike Strange mixed the song. JG and Supa Dups also sample their own vocals. According to Supa Dups, he was asked to make a beat with JG, without knowing it was for Bad Meets Evil. He said that "[They] didn't even have Eminem in mind [when they made the beat]." According to this interview with Mixtape Daily, Supa Dups had little knowledge about the project, but simply submitted the beat to Eminem. Months after recording the song, on April 28, 2011, when it leaked onto the Internet, Supa Dups was impressed by the finished version, lyrically, and was proud to have participated in the project. The song peaked at number 32 on the Hot 100 chart.

The second single, "Lighters", was originally intended to be featured on Royce's fifth studio album, Success Is Certain, but the single itself ended up on Hell: The Sequel. It was produced solely by Rochester, New York producer Battle Roy. After Royce had presented the track to Eminem, he was inspired to write and record the first verse, prompting Royce to write his the day afterwards. Bad Meets Evil then flew to Los Angeles, where singer-songwriter Bruno Mars heard the song. Eminem and Mars then made minor changes to the musical arrangement. The song was recorded at Effigy Studios by Strange, Isolation Studios by Asar and Levcon Studios (Los Angeles, California) by Ari Levine of The Smeezingtons, a music production and songwriting group consisting of Philip Lawrence and Mars. Eminem, The Smeezingtons and Battle Roy produced the song, with the latter and Joe Strange on engineering, while Luis Resto provided additional keyboards for the track. On May 25, 2011, when the track listing of Hell: The Sequel was announced, "Lighters" was revealed to the public to feature Mars. "Lighters" impacted contemporary hit radio on July 5, 2011, as the second single from the EP. "Lighters" performed better on the charts than "Fast Lane", peaking at number four on the Hot 100 chart.

Bad Meets Evil released a new song, entitled "Vegas", for the compilation album Shady XV, which was released on November 24, 2014, through Shady Records.

In 2015, two new Bad Meets Evil songs were released. The two songs, "All I Think About" and "Raw" appear on the Southpaw Soundtrack, produced by Shady Records.

In 2018, Bad Meets Evil released "Caterpillar", which featured Eminem off Royce's Book of Ryan album and "Not Alike" which featured Royce off Eminem's Kamikaze album.

== Discography ==
=== Extended plays ===
List of extended plays, with selected chart positions and certifications
Title	EP details	Peak chart positions										Certifications
Title	EP details	U.S.	U.S. R&B/HH	U.S. Rap	AUS	CAN	GER	IRE	NZ	SWI	UK	Certifications
Hell: The Sequel	Released: June 14, 2011; Label: Shady, Interscope; Formats: CD, LP, digital download	1	1	1	3	1	20	15	14	5	7	RIAA: Gold; ARIA: Platinum; BPI: Gold

=== Singles ===
List of singles, with selected chart positions and certifications, showing year released and album name
Title	Year	Peak chart positions										Certifications	Album
Title	Year	U.S.	U.S. R&B/HH	U.S. Rap	AUS	CAN	GER	IRE	NZ	SWI	UK	Certifications	Album
"Nuttin' to Do"	1998	—	—	32	—	—	—	—	—	—	182		Non-album singles
"Scary Movies"	1998	—	—	—	—	—	—	—	—	—	63		Non-album singles
"Fast Lane"	2011	32	—	—	57	50	—	—	35	—	66	RIAA: Gold; BPI: Silver	Hell: The Sequel
"Lighters" (featuring Bruno Mars)	2011	4	34	6	17	4	26	11	2	10	10	RIAA: 2× Platinum; ARIA: 3× Platinum; RMNZ: Gold; BPI: Gold	Hell: The Sequel
"—" denotes a recording that did not chart or was not released in that territory.

=== Music videos ===
List of music videos, with directors, showing year released
Title	Year	Director(s)
"Fast Lane"	2011	James Larese
"Lighters" (featuring Bruno Mars)	2011	Rich Lee

== See also ==
- Royce da 5'9" discography
- Eminem albums discography
- Eminem singles discography
