= Double X Posse =

American hip hop group

Double X Posse, also known as Double XX Posse, was an American 1990s hip hop group from Jersey City, New Jersey. Their debut album Put Ya Boots On (1992), spawned two successful singles. The first and most successful, titled "Not Gonna be Able to Do It," reached No. 1 on the Billboard Hot Rap Singles in 1992 and also reached No. 68 on the Hot R&B/Hip-Hop Singles & Tracks chart in 1993. The second single from the group, "Head Cracker," reached No. 15 on the Hot Rap Singles chart. The group released a second album, Ruff, Rugged & Raw, in 1995. Both albums were released on Atlantic Records, their first on Big Beat Records, a subsidiary of Atlantic.

"Not Gonna Be Able to Do It" appeared in the sitcom The Fresh Prince of Bel-Air in the season 3 episode titled "You Bet Your Life."

For the 1995 album, Ruff, Rugged & Raw, they released a single and video called "Money Talks" which was produced by Lord Finesse.

== Discography ==
- Put Ya Boots On - 1992
- Ruff, Rugged & Raw - 1995
