= Black Rob discography =

- Studio albums: 4
- Singles: 5
- Mixtapes: 1

American rapper Black Rob released four studio albums, one mixtape, and five singles (including two as a featured artist).

== Albums ==
=== Studio albums ===
List of studio albums, with selected chart positions
Title	Album details	Peak chart positions		Certifications
Title	Album details	US	US R&B/HH	Certifications
Life Story	Released: March 7, 2000; Label: Arista, Bad Boy; Formats: CD, LP, digital download	3	1	RIAA: Platinum
The Black Rob Report	Released: October 18, 2005; Label: Bad Boy, Atlantic; Formats: CD, LP digital download	40	10	
Game Tested, Streets Approved	Released: July 26, 2011; Label: Duck Down; Formats: CD, digital download	—	44	
Life Story 2	Released: November 3, 2023; Label: Crazy Cat Catalogue; Formats: CD, LP, digital download	—	—	
"—" denotes a recording that did not chart or was not released in that territory.

=== Mixtapes ===
Title	Mixtape details
Genuine Article	Released: April 17, 2015; Label: Slimstyle; Format: Digital download, streaming

== Singles ==
=== As lead artist ===
List of singles as lead artist, with selected chart positions, showing year released and album name
Title	Year	Peak chart positions				Album
Title	Year	US	US R&B/HH	US Rap	UK	Album
"Whoa!"	2000	43	9	8	44	Life Story
"Espacio" (featuring Lil' Kim)	2000	—	—	—	—	Life Story
"Ready"	2005	—	49	—	—	The Black Rob Report
"—" denotes a recording that did not chart or was not released in that territory.

=== As featured artist ===
List of singles as featured artist, with selected chart positions, showing year released and album name
Title	Year	Peak chart positions				Album
Title	Year	US	US R&B	US Rap	UK	Album
"Bad Boy for Life" (P. Diddy featuring Black Rob and Mark Curry)	2001	33	13	5	13	The Saga Continues...
"Let's Get It" (P. Diddy featuring Black Rob and G. Dep)	2001	80	18	5	—	The Saga Continues...
"—" denotes a recording that did not chart or was not released in that territory.
