= Good Game =

Good Game may refer to:

- GG (meaning "good game"), a slang term frequently used in multiplayer gaming at the end of a match
- Good Game (TV program), an Australian video game review television series
  - Good Game: Spawn Point, the spin-off series to the television series Good Game
- Good Game (2017 TV series), a YouTube Red comedy web series
- Goodgame Studios, a German online games company founded in 2009
- Good Game: The Transition, a 2006 American hip hop album by Saafir
- Good Game University, the former name of the North American eSports organization Team Coast
