= Carlos Broady =

- Also known as: 6 July; Six July
- Born: Carlos Daronde Broady; July 6, 1972 (age 53); South Memphis, Tennessee, US
- Genres: Hip-hop; R&B
- Occupation: Record producer
- Years active: 1996–present
- Label: Bad Boy
- Member of: The Hitmen

Carlos Broady (born July 6, 1972) is an American record producer from South Memphis, Memphis, Tennessee. Since 1996, he become a member of Bad Boy Entertainment's production team the Hitmen. He has produced songs for the likes of Lil' Kim, Puff Daddy, Capone-N-Noreaga, Ma$e, Notorious B.I.G., La the Darkman, The Lox, Saafir, Royce da 5'9", Nas, Ghostface Killah, Raekwon, Black Rob, India.Arie, Nappy Roots, 50 Cent, Guerilla Black, Yo Gotti, 2 Chainz and Kanye West.

For his work for India Arie's debut studio album Acoustic Soul, Broady has received a Grammy Award for Album of the Year nomination in conjunction with Record of the Year, Song of the Year and Best R&B Song for the album's lead single "Video" at the 44th Annual Grammy Awards held in 2002.

== Discography ==
Year	Song title	Artist(s)	Album	Notes
1996	"Queen Bitch"	Lil' Kim	High School High: The Soundtrack and Hard Core	prod. w/ Nashiem Myrick
1997	"Somebody's Gotta Die"	Notorious B.I.G.	Life After Death	prod. w/ Puff Daddy & Nashiem Myrick
1997	"What's Beef?"	Notorious B.I.G.	Life After Death	prod. w/ Nashiem Myrick, co-prod. by Paragon
1997	"Niggas Bleed"	Notorious B.I.G.	Life After Death	prod. w/ Nashiem Myrick, Puff Daddy & Stevie J.
1997	"My Downfall"	Notorious B.I.G., D.M.C.	Life After Death	
1997	"Driver's Seat"	Capone-N-Noreaga, Imam T.H.U.G., Busta Rhymes	The War Report	prod. w/ Nashiem Myrick
1997	"T.O.N.Y. (Top of New York)"	Capone-N-Noreaga, Tragedy Khadafi	The War Report	prod. w/ Nashiem Myrick
1997	"Can't Nobody Hold Me Down"	Puff Daddy, Ma$e	No Way Out	prod. w/ Puff Daddy & Nashiem Myrick
1997	"Take What's Yours"	Ma$e, DMX	Harlem World	prod. w/ Nashiem Myrick & Puff Daddy
1997	"24 Hrs. to Live"	Ma$e, The Lox, Black Rob, DMX	Harlem World	prod. w/ Deric "D-Dot" Angelettie & Nashiem Myrick
1998	"Goin' Be Some Shit"	Sheek Louch	Money, Power & Respect	prod. w/ Nashiem Myrick
1998	"Lucci"	La the Darkman	Heist of the Century	
1998	"Shine"	La the Darkman	Heist of the Century	
1998	"What Thugs Do"	La the Darkman	Heist of the Century	
1998	"Now Y"	La the Darkman	Heist of the Century	
1998	"Spring Water"	La the Darkman, Raekwon	Heist of the Century	co-prod.; prod. by Raekwon
1998	"4 Souls"	La the Darkman, Shotti Screwface	Heist of the Century	
1998	"Street Life"	La the Darkman, Tekitha	Heist of the Century	
1998	"Gun Rule"	La the Darkman	Heist of the Century	
1998	"Wu-Blood Kin"	La the Darkman, Ghostface Killah, 12 O'Clock	Heist of the Century	
1998	"I Want It All"	La the Darkman	Heist of the Century	
1999	"Small World"	Nas	I Am...	prod. w/ Nashiem Myrick
1999	"I Hear Voices"	Puff Daddy, Carl Thomas	Forever	prod. w/ Nashiem Myrick & Puff Daddy
1999	"Pain"	Puff Daddy, G. Dep	Forever	prod. w/ Nashiem Myrick & Puff Daddy
1999	"Reverse"	Puff Daddy, Shyne, G. Dep, Cee-Lo, Busta Rhymes, Sauce Money, Redman	Forever	prod. w/ Nashiem Myrick
1999	"Journey Through the Life"	Puff Daddy, Nas, Beanie Sigel, Lil' Kim, Joe Hooker	Forever	prod. w/ Nashiem Myrick & Puff Daddy
1999	"6 Digits"	Saafir, Cuttthroat, Mr. Doe	The Hit List	
1999	"Mask-A-Raid"	Saafir, Jayo Felony	The Hit List	
1999	"Yae Yo"	Raekwon	Immobilarity	
1999	"Project Windows"	Nas, Ronald Isley	Nastradamus	prod. w/ Nashiem Myrick
1999	"I've Been Through It"	Eye Cue, Mahasin, Saafir	Hobo Junction – The Cleaners	
2000	"Saturday Nite"	Ghostface Killah	Supreme Clientele	
2000	"We Made It"	Ghostface Killah, Superb, Chip Banks, Hell Razah	Supreme Clientele	
2000	"Jasmine"	Black Rob, Carl Thomas	Life Story	prod. w/ Deric "D-Dot" Angelettie & Nashiem Myrick
2000	"Wake Up"	Raekwon	Music from and Inspired by the Motion Picture Black and White	
2000	"Queen Bitch Pt. 2"	Lil' Kim, Puff Daddy	The Notorious K.I.M.	prod. w/ Nashiem Myrick & Jay Garfield
2001	"Video"	India Arie	Acoustic Soul	prod. w/ India Arie
2001	"I See God in You"	India Arie	Acoustic Soul	prod. w/ India Arie
2001	"The Hilton"	Ghostface Killah, Raekwon	Bulletproof Wallets	
2002	"Life's a Bitch"	Nappy Roots	Watermelon, Chicken & Gritz	
2002	"Stretch Armstrong Freestyle"	50 Cent	Guess Who's Back?	prod. w/ Nashiem Myrick
2002	"My Crew, Pt. 2"	Supervision, Blind Gotti	Bad Company: Music from the Motion Picture	
2002	"Let's Go"	Royce da 5'9", Twista	Rock City	
2002	"Who Am I"	Royce da 5'9"	Rock City	
2002	"My Crew"	Supervision, Black Child, Ja Rule	20/20	
2002	"Voices in My Mind"	Supervision	20/20	
2004	"Regardless"	Royce da 5'9"	Death Is Certain	
2004	"I Promise"	Royce da 5'9", Ingrid Smalls	Death Is Certain	
2004	"Gangsta"	Royce da 5'9"	Death Is Certain	
2004	"T.O.D.A.Y"	Royce da 5'9", Ingrid Smalls	Death Is Certain	
2004	"Beef"	Royce da 5'9"	Death Is Certain	prod. w/ Mark Bassin
2004	"Everybody Goes"	Royce da 5'9", Ingrid Smalls	Death Is Certain	
2004	"Death Is Certain Pt. 2 (It Hurts)"	Royce da 5'9", Ingrid Smalls, Cha Cha	Death Is Certain	
2004	"Something's Wrong With Him"	Royce da 5'9"	Death Is Certain	
2004	"Hearts of Fire"	Guerilla Black	Guerilla City	
2004	"Compton"	Guerilla Black, Beenie Man	Guerilla City	
2004	"Say What"	Guerilla Black	Guerilla City	
2005	"I Owe You"	Royce da 5'9"	Independent's Day	
2005	"Looking at My Dog"	Royce da 5'9", Yo Gotti, Ingrid Smalls	Independent's Day	
2005	"Independent's Day"	Royce da 5'9"	Independent's Day	
2005	"Meeting of the Bosses"	Royce da 5'9"	Independent's Day	
2005	"Yeah"	Royce da 5'9", Ingrid Smalls	Independent's Day	
2006	"Spend It Cuz U Got It"	Yo Gotti, All Star Ca$hville Prince	Back 2 da Basics	
2006	"Gangsta Party"	Yo Gotti, Bun B, 8Ball	Back 2 da Basics	
2006	"25 to Life"	Yo Gotti	Back 2 da Basics	
2006	"We Gonna Be Alright"	Yo Gotti	Back 2 da Basics	
2006	"A Part of Thugs"	Yo Gotti, Jazze Pha	Back 2 da Basics	
2009	"Part of Me"	Royce da 5'9"	Street Hop	
2012	"Ghetto Dreams"	2 Chainz, Scarface, John Legend	Based on a T.R.U. Story	
2013	"Blood on the Leaves"	Kanye West	Yeezus	co-prod.; prod. by Kanye West, Hudson Mohawke & Lunice, add. prod. by 88-Keys, Mike Dean & Arca
2021	"Black Savage"	Royce da 5'9"	The Allegory	co-prod.; prod. by Royce da 5'9"

== Awards and nominations ==
Year	Nominee / work	Award	Result	Ref.
2002	Acoustic Soul	Grammy Award for Album of the Year	Nominated	
2002	"Video"	Grammy Award for Record of the Year	Nominated	
2002	"Video"	Grammy Award for Song of the Year	Nominated	
2002	"Video"	Grammy Award for Best R&B Song	Nominated	
