= Rock City (song) =

Single by Royce da 5'9" featuring Eminem

from the album Rock City (Version 2.0)
- Released: January 5, 2002
- Recorded: 2000
- Genre: Hardcore hip hop
- Length: 4:14
- Label: E1; Game
- Songwriters: Ryan Montgomery; Marshall Mathers; Andy Thelusma
- Producer: Red Spyda

Royce da 5'9" singles chronology
"I Wanna Be Bad" (2001)	"Rock City" (2002)	"Hip Hop" (2003)

Eminem singles chronology
"The Watcher" (2001)	"Rock City" (2002)	"Hellbound" (2002)

"Rock City" is a song by American rapper Royce da 5'9", released as the third single from his debut album, Rock City (Version 2.0), which was released in 2002 through MNRK Music Group (formerly Koch Records) and Game Recordings, after Columbia Records turned down the first version of the album. The song also features vocals from rapper Eminem, becoming Eminem's debut appearance on one of Royce's solo albums. The single was released on January 5, 2002, the same date as its same titled album was released. "Rock City" charted at #99 on the Hot R&B/Hip-Hop Singles & Tracks chart in 2002. Not counting Bad Meets Evil or Slaughterhouse songs, "Rock City" is Royce's most successful single chart-wise.

== Critical response ==
Bradley Torreano highlighted the song and wrote: "The rollicking hometown anthem "Rock City" includes Eminem on the snappy chorus, but the verses are pure Royce as he waxes philosophical his role in the Motor City scene." Afrikka of DX magazine was also positive: "Rock City" the first single off this album is just a straight banger. Featuring Eminem on the chorus, this beat will have you nodding. However, I must say that the remix that is present on this album is not as good. Because this is an Enhanced CD, you are privy to the original "Rock City" video and song; that's where it's at." Rap Reviews was lukewarm: "As the ticking and menacing Primo beat banged out Royce's street-smart punchlines coast to coast, the first version of "Rock City" was heavily anticipated by hungry rap head (...) Despite a brief push for the title track (wisely featuring Eminem) as the second single, "Rock City" was put on the shelf and both rapper and album went back for fine tuning." Vibe magazine called this song "hometown anthem."

== Music video ==
Rock City music video was premiered on January 28, 2002. The music video for "Rock City" starts off with a view of a woman's house, she decides to put on a Royce da 5'9" record and have a peaceful cup of tea. She then almost spills her tea after the television turns on along with the noisy record starting, there is a news report called "Eyewitnessing News" and the reporter reports about so many people rushing to a hip hop performance where both Royce and Eminem are playing the song. The rest of the music video just shows Royce da 5'9" either driving around in his convertible car or at the performance place when he is rapping his verses. Eminem sings the chorus and only appears in the live performance scenes of the video. American rapper Proof from the rap group D12, which is Eminem's group, can be seen near the end of the video.

== Track listing ==
No.	Title	Writer(s)	Producer(s)	Length
1.	"Rock City" (album version) (explicit) (featuring Eminem)	Ryan Montgomery; Marshall Mathers; Andy Thelusma	Red Spyda	4:06
2.	"Boom" (album version) (explicit)	Montgomery; Christopher Martin	DJ Premier	3:53
3.	"She's the One" (album version) (explicit) (featuring Tre Little)	Montgomery; Tracey Dotson; Pharrell Williams; Charles Hugo	The Neptunes	3:32
4.	"Rock City" (instrumental) (featuring Eminem)	Montgomery; Mathers; Thelusma	Red Spyda	4:06
Total length:				15:37

== Chart positions ==
"'Rock City'" charted at #99 on the "US Billboard Hot R&B/Hip-Hop Singles & Tracks Charts", #45 on the "Belgium Charts", #30 on the "Germany Charts", #44 on the "Sweden Charts" and #37 on the "Switzerland Charts" respectively.

Chart (2002)	Peak position
US Hot R&B/Hip-Hop Singles & Tracks (Billboard)	99
Belgium (Ultratop 50 Flanders)	45
Germany (Media Control AG)	30
Sweden (Sverigetopplistan)	44
Switzerland (Schweizer Hitparade)	37
