= Ann Breen =

Irish singer

- Origin: Downpatrick, Northern Ireland
- Genres: Celtic, pop
- Occupation: Singer
- Years active: 1981–present
- Label: Homespun
- Website: www.annbreen.com

Ann Breen is a vocalist, who was born in Downpatrick, Northern Ireland. She is best known for her single, "Pal of my Cradle Days". The track was released on the Homespun label and entered the UK Singles Chart on 19 February 1983, and rose to a high of number 69; it only remained in the chart for one week. The song spent an unusually lengthy time in the "bubbling under" section of the chart throughout 1983 and into early 1984 - a total of 17 weeks.

It re-entered the UK chart again on 7 January 1984, and reached number 74 - again, it appeared in the listing for only one week. "Pal of my Cradle Days" is an old song and was composed by Al Piantadosi, with the lyrics written by Marshall Montgomery, in 1925.

Breen has released a number of albums, which contain a mix of Irish songs, American country music tracks and old-time songs. She no longer tours, preferring to spend her time recording.
