= Tenement Symphony (Marc Almond album) =

Studio album by Marc Almond
- Released: 14 October 1991
- Recorded: 1991
- Studio: Maison Rouge; Sarm West (London); Fishermans Room (Berlin); CTS; Berwick St; RAK; Pacific
- Genre: Synthpop; art pop
- Length: 47:54
- Label: WEA; Some Bizzare; Sire Records
- Producer: Marc Almond; Trevor Horn; Billy McGee; Nigel Hine; The Grid

Marc Almond chronology
Memorabilia – The Singles (1991)	Tenement Symphony (1991)	Absinthe (1993)

Singles from Tenement Symphony
- 1. "Jacky" b/w "Deep Night" Released: September 1991; 2. "My Hand Over My Heart" b/w "Deadly Serenade" Released: January 1992; 3. "The Days of Pearly Spencer" b/w "Bruises" Released: April 1992

Tenement Symphony (subtitled Kies und Glanz • Grit and Glitter • Grès et Paillettes) is the seventh studio album by English singer-songwriter Marc Almond. It was released in October 1991 and reached number 39 on the UK Albums Chart. Tenement Symphony includes three UK top 40 hit singles: "Jacky", "My Hand Over My Heart" and "The Days of Pearly Spencer" (which would become Almond's last UK top 10 hit to date).

== Background ==
Working with former La Magia and Willing Sinners member Billy McGee, and his former Soft Cell bandmate David Ball as well as various studio musicians, Almond recorded the album at Maison Rouge, Sarm West Studios, Fishermans Room, Berlin, CTS Studios, Berwick St Studios, RAK and Pacific Studios.

== Composition ==
The album is divided into two sections: 'Grit' and 'Glitter'. The first five songs constituted the 'Grit' and were produced by Almond, Billy McGee, Nigel Hine, and The Grid. The 'Glitter' side (the Tenement Symphony) was produced by Trevor Horn. The artwork was designed by Green Ink with a cover photograph by Klanger and Boink. The album cover mimics the style of German record label Deutsche Grammophon's classical records.

Almond wrote in his autobiography that the album's concept was largely down to Rob Dickins and that he did not feel the album truly reflected his artistic direction at that time, though he was pleased to have had the opportunity to work with Trevor Horn.

Professional ratings
Review scores
Source	Rating
AllMusic	3.5/5 stars
Encyclopedia of Popular Music	2/5 stars
NME	6/10

== Track listing ==
All tracks are written by Marc Almond, except where indicated

Side one
No.	Title	Writer(s)	Length
1.	"Meet Me in My Dream"	Almond; David Ball	4:24
2.	"Beautiful Brutal Thing"		5:02
3.	"I've Never Seen Your Face"	Almond; Ball	5:02
4.	"Vaudeville and Burlesque"		6:52
5.	"Champagne"		5:47

Side two (Tenement Symphony)
No.	Title	Writer(s)	Length
6.	"i. Prelude"	Ball	0:23
7.	"ii. Jacky"	Jacques Brel; Gérard Jouannest	4:49
8.	"iii. What Is Love?"	Bruce Woolley; Trevor Horn	5:04
9.	"iv. Trois Chansons de Bilitis – Extract"	Claude Debussy	0:54
10.	"v. The Days of Pearly Spencer"	David McWilliams; Almond (additional lyrics)	4:22
11.	"vi. My Hand Over My Heart"	Almond; Ball	5:15

== Personnel ==
- Marc Almond – vocals, keyboards, arranger
- David Ball – synthesizer, programming
- Anne Dudley – keyboards, arranger, orchestration
- J.J. Belle – guitar
- Sally Bradshaw – vocals
- Betsy Cook – vocals
- Mitch Dalton – guitar
- Andy Duncan – drums, percussion, percussion programming
- Trevor Horn – bass on "What Is Love?", organ
- Billy McGee – keyboards, arranger
- Julian Mendelsohn – mixing
- Richard Norris – percussion programming
- Nick Plytas – piano on "I've Never Seen Your Face"
- Lynda Richardson – choir master
- Richard Riley – guitar
- Philip Todd – soprano and tenor saxophone
- Tim Weidner – bass
- Bruce Woolley – keyboards, vocals
- Gavyn Wright – string conductor
- Nigel Hine – programming
- Julian Stringle – clarinet
- Steve Rapport – artwork
- Inga Humpe – programming, vocals
- Eric Caudieux – guitar, keyboards, programming
- Max Loderbauer – programming

== Charts ==
Chart (1991)	Peak position
UK Albums (OCC)	48

Chart (1992)	Peak position
UK Albums (OCC)	39

Chart performance for Tenement Symphony (reissue)
Chart (2023)	Peak position
Scottish Albums (OCC)	50
UK Independent Albums (OCC)	18

== See also ==
- The Big Store § Musical numbers – musical with song "Tenement Symphony" sung by Tony Martin
