= Boom (Royce da 5'9" song) =

Single by Royce da 5'9"

from the album Rock City
- B-side: "Soldier's Story"
- Released: December 14, 1999
- Recorded: 1999
- Genre: Hip hop
- Length: 3:56
- Label: E1; Game
- Songwriters: Ryan Montgomery; Christopher Martin
- Producer: DJ Premier

Royce da 5'9" singles chronology
"I'm the King" (1999)	"Boom" (1999)	"You Can't Touch Me" (2000)

"Boom" is a song and the first single from rapper Royce da 5'9"'s debut studio album Rock City which was released in 2002 through E1 Music (formerly "Koch Records) and Game Recordings after another record label had turned down his first version of the album. The single however was released on December 14, 1999, in CD and vinyl form. "Boom" was Royce's first single as a solo artist and was the source of him gaining underground notability as a rap artist. The B-side of this single is "Soldier's Story". "Boom" was later sampled on the track "Crash", performed by West Coast rapper Schoolboy Q from his 2019 album Crash Talk.

== Chart performance ==
The song "Boom" reached No. 48 on the Billboard Hot Rap Singles chart in 1999.

== Music video ==
The music video to "Boom" starts off with a clock ticking in the background. Royce da 5'9" is sleeping in his bed and wakes up as soon as the music starts. As he gets out of his bed he retrieves "the clock" and chucks it on the ground (it later shows his body in x-ray form along with an actual clock time bomb inside his body). The music video continues with him rapping along the street wearing cargo pants, boots, a shirt, vest and a broad brimmed hat. Occasionally he will scare off other people in the street by revealing the ticking time bomb concealed in his vest. The rest of the music video shows snaps of Royce with other people in dance clubs and even being detected by a person at the shops with a Geiger counter. The music video ends with the time bomb exploding in the middle of the street in front of many witnesses.

== Track listing ==
CD single
No.	Title	Writer(s)	Sample(s)	Length
1.	"Boom"	R. Montgomery, Christopher Martin	*Contains samples of "Forever Is a Long, Long Time" by Marc Hannibal: "Anthology" by Kay-Gees; "You Know My Steez" by Gang Starr; "Afro Puffs" by The Lady of Rage	3:56

== Charts ==
1999 chart performance for "Boom"
Chart (1999)	Peak position
US Hot Rap Singles (Billboard)	48

2003 chart performance for "Boom"
Chart (2003)	Peak position
Australia (ARIA)	91
