= Ilacoin =

American rapper

- Born: July 15, 1973 (age 52); Bronx, New York City, United States
- Origin: Harlem, New York
- Genres: Hip Hop, R&B
- Occupations: Entrepreneur, Executive Producer, Songwriter, Emcee, Artist
- Labels: Gee Street, Island Records, Game Recordings, Rawkus, Fat Beats, Triple Bars

Christian J. A. Faloye (born July 15, 1973), known by his stage names Ilacoin (or simply COIN), is an American Songwriter, EMCEE, Rapper and Producer.

== Early life ==
He is the grandson of Yoruba royalty, the child of Nigerian immigrants, but raised mostly by a single American mother. His father, before he was 1 would move him around all of New York to Delaware to New Jersey back to Harlem, where he finally became settled at age 9, living across the street from Tupac Shakur and family. There in Harlem with the absence of a father, a latchkey child, he would begin to become familiar with the local gang and street life. His cousin Fatima Faloye of New York Undercover fame, who he refers to as his sister would be instrumental in "keeping" him out of the streets, eventually introducing him to Ahmed Obafemi and wife, Sonoviah (parents to Tchaka Zulu of DTP/Ebony Son) who would become his "godparents" and introduce him to Islam for the first time in his life. Ilacoin became a respected talent from Harlem in the Hip Hop culture.

== Early career ==
Serving originally as a Hip Hop dancer, he frequented the New York City night life since the age of 14, socializing with the likes of Doug E. Fresh, Puff Daddy (Diddy), Mike Tyson, Red Alert, and others. Supported by Rev. Mariah Britton and the Riverside Church Afterschool program he honed his skills as a leader and choreographer scoring 1st place at The Apollo Amateur night. He began rapping soon after, opening up for Poor Righteous Teachers, Brand Nubian, Nice and Smooth, Main Source and Leaders of The New School. He earned his name in the streets as an MC battling on the streets and in project hallways.

== Professional career ==
Offered deals from labels since 16, he began to learn the business behind the scenes. Still running the streets, he became distracted until his 1st son Christian Tokyo was born. That began to help him focus, garnering the interest of Doug E Fresh. He would go on to co-write and make his first professional appearance on Fresh's last major label distributed album, Play (Ayo-Aiight, Get Da Money & Breath of Fresh Air) while raising his children as a single father. Ultimately becoming estranged for a time from Fresh, he would return to the streets. While working on Play, he would meet Easy Mo Bee (Notorious B.I.G., 2Pac, Big Daddy Kane, Miles Davis & etc.) and Ski Beatz (Bizzy Boyz, Original Flavor, Jay-Z, Camp Lo, etc.). Both would become instrumental in teaching him production, beatmaking and the pitfalls of the music industry. He would lend his talent for creating & spotting hits to influence records on Jay-Z's Reasonable Doubt (Can't Knock The Hustle and Dead Presidents). His network consisting of many of Hip Hop's elite would lead him to finally signing his 1st and only industry deal in 1999 with Game Recordings through Rawkus. (Eminem, Royce 5' 9"). He would release two singles: By A Stranger (Grand Theft Auto III) featuring Black Rob (Bad Boy) and then unknown, Labba (Flipmode Squad) and Keep It Street featuring Sadat X of Brand Nubian.

Due to differences with the label, he then parted, starting Triple Bars Inc. He released his own independent single with Fat Beats Distribution called Fighting Clocks Remix featuring Lord Jamar of Brand Nubian. All singles met modest sales but critical acclaim in the Hip Hop community, as well as The Source. As well as having the honor of hitting #1 on the charts in war stricken parts of the world with "By A Stranger" (i.e. Croatia), "Keep It Street" remained one of Hip Hop Legend, Chuck D's top 5 songs for 2000–2001. Having consistently recorded songs throughout, Ilacoin released his first ever mixtape compiling many of his unreleased and released works (ILACOIN: EPISODE 0) in 2010 to please his loyal fans through Complex.com& KevinNottingham.com. Working from his own studio, he became one of Hip Hop's classic beatsmiths. His childhood friend, Ron Browz lent his vocals to Ilacoin's single, Family Business (unreleased). Ilacoin is an artist who has stayed true to Hip Hop's independent spirit. Having problems with receiving his publishing royalties since the beginning of his career, he refuses to let his best work out until he establishes himself on all fronts of the music industry. The Wu-Tang Clan interpolated his music from a record he wrote with Easy Mo Bee (This, That & The 3rd; B-side to Keep It Street) on their last hit single (Take It Back) in 2008. Most of Ilacoin's songs were about growing up amid violence and hardship in ghettos, racism, problems in the society and conflicts with the industry and authority. Finding his voice in his community, he serves as an activist standing up for many causes including Child Abuse Prevention and Finding Missing Children. It should also be noted that Ilacoin is the originator of the pop cultural game phenomenon, Pause.

In 2010, Ilacoin collaborated with Ski Beatz under the Dame Dash DD172 umbrella which ultimately led to him co-producing Smoke Dza's "Sour Hour", off the George Kush Da Button album (He was not properly credited for this work). Ilacoin continues to produce and is currently working on his album, songs with Ron Browz, Shabaam Sahdeeq, Smoke Dza, G. Dep and others. His latest work is featuring and acting as Executive Producer on G. Dep’s record, “DOPE” of the artist’s project, Lessons Never Losses, distributed by Roc Nation in 2024. COIN also photographed and created the album cover for Lessons Never Losses with G. Dep. Ever the evolving creative, Ilacoin has taken on the title "Mint God”.

== See also ==
- List of Nigerian Americans
- List of people from Harlem
- Hip-Hop
- Grand Theft Auto III
