= You Can't Touch Me =

Single by Royce da 5'9"

from the album Rock City (Version 2.0)
- B-side: "D-Elite"
- Released: April 26, 2000
- Recorded: 1999
- Genre: Hip hop
- Length: 3:56
- Label: E1 Music; Game
- Songwriters: Ryan Montgomery; Asiah Louis; Samuel Barnes; Jean Claude Olivier; Shalena Bratcher
- Producer: Trackmasters

Royce da 5'9" singles chronology
"Boom" (1999)	"You Can't Touch Me" (2000)	"I Wanna Be Bad" (2001)

"You Can't Touch Me" is a song and the second single from rapper Royce da 5'9"'s debut studio album Rock City (Version 2.0), which was released in 2002 by E1 Music (formerly "Koch Records") and Game Recordings after another record label had turned down his first version of the album. The single was released on April 26, 2000, in CD and vinyl form. Though not credited, "You Can't Touch Me" features various vocals on the song by Cha Cha. The B-side for this single is "D-Elite".

== Chart positions ==
"You Can't Touch Me" peaked at No. 66 on the Billboard Hot R&B/Hip-Hop Singles & Tracks chart in 2000.

Chart (2000)	Peak position
US Hot R&B/Hip-Hop Singles & Tracks (Billboard)	66

== Music video ==
The music video for "You Can't Touch Me" directed by Annti Jokinen starts off with Royce sleeping in his bed and awakening when the music starts. He then starts rapping, along with showing camera perspectives of numerous sleeping women in his room. As the second verse strikes, Royce appears in a dance club rapping along while the other people are dancing to the music. During the chorus, a lady from the dance club sings it. The third verse shows Royce leaving the building and walking to his car. When he reaches his car, he sees a woman waiting for him in the back seat to drive away from the building.

== Track listing ==
CD single

No.	Title	Writer(s)	Length
1.	"You Can't Touch Me"	R. Montgomery	3:56
