= Vietnam Veterans =

Vietnam Veterans may refer to:

- The Vietnam Veterans, a French psychedelic musical group
- Vietnam veteran, a phrase used to describe someone who served in the armed forces of participating countries during the Vietnam War
