= David McWilliams (musician) =

Northern Irish musician (1945–2002)

Background information
- Born: David Samuel McWilliams; 4 July 1945; Belfast, Northern Ireland
- Died: 8 January 2002 (aged 56) Ballycastle, County Antrim, Northern Ireland
- Occupations: Singer, songwriter
- Instruments: Vocals, guitar
- Years active: 1965–1980s
- Labels: CBS; Major Minor; Dawn; EMI; Kapp (USA)
- Website: http://www.davidmcwilliams.com/

David Samuel McWilliams (4 July 1945 – 8 January 2002) was a Northern Irish singer, songwriter and guitarist, best known for his 1967 song, "Days of Pearly Spencer".

== Life ==
McWilliams was born in the Cregagh area of Belfast and moved to Ballymena at the age of three. He began playing guitar and writing songs in his early teens. After leaving Ballymena Technical College in 1963, he started an apprenticeship at the Shorts missile factory in Antrim, and also started a local dance band, the Coral Showband. He was a well-respected football player, and had a trial with Linfield as a goalkeeper.

He recorded a demo of some of his own songs, which was heard by music industry entrepreneur Phil Solomon, who had previously managed The Bachelors and Van Morrison's band Them and also had close business ties with Ronan O'Rahilly's pirate radio station Radio Caroline. Solomon convinced close friend and well established songwriter Dominic Behan to take McWilliams under his wing to the point that McWilliams moved into the Behan family home in West London, an environment within which he was able to focus on songwriting; the impact of Behan's influence is difficult to determine but, it can be seen that McWilliams' live performances became much more self-assured, a key to future success. Following a period of five months in Behan's household, Solomon was able to negotiate a contract with CBS Records, which released his first, unsuccessful single "God and My Country" in 1966, before signing McWilliams to his own new Major Minor label. McWilliams and Behan were to remain close friends until the death of Dominic Behan in 1989.

McWilliams' first album, David McWilliams Singing Songs by David McWilliams, was produced and arranged by Mike Leander, and reached number 38 on the UK Albums Chart. He quickly recorded a second album, David McWilliams Volume 2, which reached number 23 in the same album chart and featured the single "Days of Pearly Spencer". This was a song about a homeless man McWilliams had encountered in Ballymena, and featured a sweeping orchestral arrangement by Leander and a chorus sung as if through a megaphone. This low-tech effect was actually achieved by recording the vocals from a phone box near the studio. (In the promotional video for the single, the positions were reversed. He sings in his normal voice into a telephone but the phone effect vocals are sung in various locations, such as the side of a canal, the Oude Gracht (near the Choorstraat) in the centre of Utrecht, the Netherlands).

Exposure on Radio Caroline and through advertisements in the UK music press in the summer of 1967 helped generate interest and sales in continental Europe, and the record was a Top 10 hit in numerous countries including France, Belgium and the Netherlands, selling a million copies worldwide. However, although it became well known in the UK, "Days of Pearly Spencer" failed to make the UK Singles Chart, perhaps because the BBC refused to play it owing to Solomon's links with pirate radio, and through mismanagement McWilliams never profited from the song's success. In Italy, the song was covered in 1968 by Caterina Caselli as "Il Volto Della Vita". A Spanish version called "Vuelo blanco de gaviota" was recorded in 1979 by Ana Belén. Successful later versions of the song included a disco version which reached number 1 in Belgium in the 1980s, and a cover version in 1988 by the French psychedelic band The Vietnam Veterans and their album The Days of Pearly Spencer. A recording by Marc Almond, with an additional verse written by Almond giving the song a more optimistic tone, reached number 4 in the UK Singles Chart in 1992, and also made number 8 in Ireland.

McWilliams released another album, David McWilliams Volume 3, and several further singles for Major Minor, and toured widely in Europe, on some occasions with The Dubliners and the Kerries. His 1968 song, "Can I Get There By Candlelight?" was used for the theme of a Dutch radio programme, Candlelight with Jan van Veen. He became popular in Germany and Italy, as well as in France and the Netherlands, and re-recorded some songs in Italian. Reportedly, David Bowie once named McWilliams as his favourite songwriter. An album, Days of Pearly Spencer, comprising tracks from his three albums, was issued by Kapp Records in the US in 1968. He moved to London, and released further albums and singles on the Parlophone and Dawn labels in the 1970s, but these were unsuccessful.

McWilliams moved back to Northern Ireland in 1978. He performed infrequently after that, mostly in local bars, although he also headlined a concert in aid of striking miners in 1984 and occasionally appeared at the Ballycastle Northern Lights Festival. A compilation album, The Days of David McWilliams, was issued by RPM Records in 2001.

On 8 January 2002, McWilliams died suddenly of a heart attack at his home in Ballycastle, County Antrim, at the age of 56. He was married twice and had eight children.

== Discography ==
=== Albums ===
- Singing Songs by David McWilliams (1967) – Major Minor – UK number 38
- David McWilliams Volume 2 (1967) – Major Minor – UK number 23
- Days Of Pearly Spencer - Who Killed Ezra Brymay (1968) - Kapp Records – KS 3547 - US
- David McWilliams Volume 3 (1968) – Major Minor – UK number 39
- Lord Offaly (1972) – Dawn
- The Beggar and the Priest (1973) – Dawn
- Livin's Just A State of Mind (1974) – Dawn
- David McWilliams (1977) – EMI
- Don't Do It For Love (1978) – EMI
- When I Was A Dancer (1979) – EMI (Europe only)
- Wounded (1981) – Carmel
- Working for the Government (1987) – Homespun
- Bucket Full of Dreams (1995) Ja Records (Private release)
- Using Me (2003) – Blueprint

=== Soundtrack albums ===
- Gold (1972) – Mother (Three tracks: "Go On Back to Momma", "Gold" and "Move over Gabriel")

=== Singles ===
Year	Single	Chart Positions					
Year	Single	UK	AU	BEL	GER	NL	FR
1966	"God and My Country"/"Blue Eyes"	—	—	—	—	—	—
1967	"Harlem Lady"/"Days of Pearly Spencer"	51 (Note: Chart position is from the "Bubbling Under/Breakers" list for songs outside of top 50 dated 25 October 1967.)	32	2	47	8	1
1968	"Marlena"/"How Can I Be Free?"	—	—	—	—	—	—
1968	"This Side of Heaven"/"Mr Satisfied"	—	—	42	—	—	—
1968	"Who Killed Ezra Brymay?"/"Marlena"	—	—	—	—	—	—
1969	"Fiori nel vento"/"Correrai, Correrai"	—	—	—	—	—	—
1969	"Oh Mama Are You My Friend"/"I Love Susie In The Summer"	—	—	—	—	—	—
1969	"The Stranger"/"Follow Me"	—	—	—	—	—	—
1969	"Three O'Clock Flamingo Street"/"What's The Matter With Me"	—	—	—	—	32	—
1969	"Un sasso nel cuore"/"Lo Straniero"	—	—	—	—	—	—
1969	"Can I Get There By Candlelight?"	—	—	—	—	18	—
1972	"Gold"/"Go On Back To Momma"	—	—	—	—	—	—
1972	"Maggie's Coming Home"/"Margie"	—	—	—	—	—	—
1973	"Love Like a Lady"	—	—	—	—	—	—
1974	"You've Only Been a Stranger"/"Ships in the Night"	—	—	—	—	—	—
1977	"By The Lights of Cyrian"/"Toby"	—	—	—	—	—	—
1977	"Love Walked In (When You Walked Out Today)"/"Don't Need Your Blues"	—	—	—	—	—	—
1978	"Don't Do It For Love"/"Marko the Majician"	—	—	—	—	—	—
1979	"Circles"/"Dusty Bluebells"	—	—	—	—	—	—
1981	"Black Velvet"/"Every Time"	—	—	—	—	—	—
1987	"Working for the Government"/"Listen to the Heart"	—	—	—	—	—	—
1994	"Candlelight" (with Connie Witteman, popularly known as Vanessa)	—	—	—	—	31	—
1994	"Circles"/"Laugh at the Clown" (with Michael Robinson)	—	—	—	—	—	—
1994	"Dream Street Rose"	—	—	—	—	—	—
"—" denotes songs that did not chart or not released in the territory
