= Hellbound (song) =

2002 single by Eminem

- Limited edition cover

Single by Eminem, J-Black and Masta Ace

from the album Game Over
- B-side: "Spread It Out", "Rap 2K1"
- Released: April 22, 2002
- Genre: Hip-hop
- Length: 3:58
- Label: Fon-Ky; 2 Jiggy; ZYX
- Songwriters: Marshall Mathers; Jeret Faust; Duval Clear; Takanori Otsuka
- Producer: DJ Rob

Eminem singles chronology
"Rock City" (2002)	"Hellbound" (2002)	"Without Me" (2002)

Masta Ace singles chronology
"Don't Understand" (2001)	"Hellbound" (2002)	"Good Ol' Love" (2004)

Alternative cover
- Original cover

"Hellbound (H&H Remix)", or simply "Hellbound", is a song written and recorded by American rappers Eminem, J-Black and Masta Ace for the Yosumi Records compilation album Game Over (2000). The song was produced by DJ Rob and is a remix of Eminem's verse on "Hustlers & Hardcore" from Domingo's 1999 album Behind the Doors of the 13th Floor.

The song was released as a single on April 22, 2002 in Europe, charting in countries such as France and Switzerland.

== Formats and track listings ==
- 12-inch vinyl single
1. "Hellbound" (Eminem, Masta Ace and J-Black) – 3:58
2. "Rap 2K1" (Masta Ace) – 3:47
- CD single
1. "Hellbound" (Eminem, Masta Ace and J-Black) – 3:58
2. "Spread It Out" (Masta Ace) – 3:03
3. "Rap 2K1" (Masta Ace) – 3:47

== Charts ==
Chart (2002–03)	Peak position
Belgium (Ultratip Flanders)	10
Belgium (Ultratip Wallonia)	4
France (SNEP)	53
Switzerland (Schweizer Hitparade)	85
UK Singles (Official Charts Company)	183
