= The Hit List (Saafir album) =

Studio album by Saafir
- Released: October 26, 1999
- Recorded: 1998–1999
- Genre: Hip-hop
- Length: 59:25
- Label: Qwest
- Producer: 6 July; Big Nous; Corey "R.I.P." Barker; DJ Clark Kent; J Groove; Nick Wiz; Protest; Shock G; Stevie J.; The Glove; Tony Pizarro; Omonte Ward

Saafir chronology
Trigonometry (1998)	The Hit List (1999)	Good Game: The Transition (2006)

Singles from The Hit List
- 1. "Crawl Before You Ball" Released: August 4, 1998

Professional ratings
Review scores
Source	Rating
AllMusic	3/5 stars
The Harvard Crimson	C+

The Hit List is the third solo studio album by American rapper Saafir. It was released on October 26, 1999, through Qwest Records. Production was handled by Shock G, Big Nous, Protest, Six July, Corey "R.I.P." Barker, DJ Clark Kent, J Groove, Nick Wiz, Stevie J, The Glove, Tony Pizarro and Omonte Ward. It features guest appearances from Chino XL, Cutthroat, Jayo Felony, Kam, Mahasin and Mr. Doe. The album peaked at number 91 on the Billboard Top R&B/Hip-Hop Albums chart in the United States. Its lead single "Crawl Before You Ball" made it to number 47 on the Billboard Hot Rap Songs chart. Songs "Not Fa' Nuthin'" and "Watch How Daddy Ball" were released as promotional singles.

== Track listing ==
No.	Title	Writer(s)	Producer(s)	Length
1.	"Hit List"	Reginald Gibson; Christopher Taylor	The Glove	3:40
2.	"A Dog's Master"	Gibson; Rodolfo Antonio Franklin	DJ Clark Kent	3:48
3.	"Crawl Before You Ball"	Gibson; Greg Jacobs; Maurice White; Verdine White; Eduardo Del Barrio	Shock G	3:54
4.	"Watch How Daddy Ball" (featuring Kam)	Gibson; Craig Miller; Steven Jordan; Omonte Ward	Stevie J; Omonte Ward	4:11
5.	"Slip into My Eyes"	Gibson; Tony Pizarro; Jeff Fortson	Tony Pizarro	4:18
6.	"6 Digits" (featuring Cutthroat and Mr. Doe)	Gibson; Joel Bryant; Darnell Jordan; Terry Price; Douglas Price; Corey Parker; Carlos Broady	Corey "R.I.P." Parker; Carlos "Six July" Broady	3:58
7.	"Not Fa' Nuthin'" (featuring Chino XL)	Gibson; Derek Barbosa; Nicholas Loizides; Robert Mounsey	Nick Wiz	4:17
8.	"Pokerface"	Gibson; Roger Roberts	Protest	3:42
9.	"25 ta Life" (featuring Mahasin)	Gibson; Tyrone Alston; Kejuan Muchita; Albert Johnson	Big Nous	2:59
10.	"Mask-A-Raid" (featuring Jayo Felony)	Gibson; James Savage; Broady	Carlos "Six July" Broady	4:35
11.	"Liquid Ho Magnet"	Gibson; Jacobs	Shock G	4:52
12.	"Smart Bomb"	Gibson; Roberts	Protest	2:49
13.	"Bedroom Bully"	Gibson; James Carson	J Groove	3:32
14.	"Runnin' Man"	Gibson; Jacobs	Shock G	4:36
15.	"Final Thrill"	Gibson; Alston	Big Nous	4:14
Total length:				59:25

== Personnel ==
- Reggie "Saafir" Gibson — vocals, mixing (track 8), executive producer
- Craig "Kam" Miller — vocals (track 4)
- Cutthroat — vocals (track 6)
- Mr. Doe — vocals (track 6)
- Derek "Chino XL" Barbosa — vocals (track 7)
- Mahasin — vocals (track 9)
- James "Jayo Felony" Savage — vocals (track 10)
- Gregory "Shock G" Jacobs — additional vocals & mixing (tracks: 3, 11), producer (tracks: 3, 11, 14)
- Toika Troutman — additional vocals (track 3)
- Chameleon — additional vocals (track 4)
- Chris "The Glove" Taylor — producer (track 1), mixing (tracks: 1, 12, 15)
- Rodolfo "DJ Clark Kent" Franklin — producer (track 2)
- Steven "Stevie J." Jordan — producer & mixing (track 4)
- Omonte Ward — co-producer (track 4)
- Tony Pizarro — producer (track 5), recording (tracks: 11, 14), mixing (tracks: 3–5, 9–13, 15)
- Carlos "Six July" Broady — producer (tracks: 6, 10)
- Corey "R.I.P." Barker — producer (track 6)
- Nicholas "Nick Wiz" Loizides — producer (track 7)
- Roger "Protest" Roberts — producer (tracks: 8, 12), mixing (track 8)
- Ty "Big Nous" Alston — producer (tracks: 9, 15), mixing (track 9)
- James "J Groove" Carson — producer & mixing (track 13)
- Rashaan "Cus" Stephens — mixing (track 2)
- Andy Grassi — mixing (track 4)
- Caveman Haywood — mixing (track 6)
- Ken "Duro" Ifill — mixing (track 7)
- Kevin Kim — mixing (track 8)
- Chris Bellman — mastering
- Kairi Brown — executive producer
- Tarif Supreme — co-executive producer

== Charts ==
Chart (1999)	Peak position
US Top R&B/Hip-Hop Albums (Billboard)	91
