= Trigonometry (album) =

Studio album by Saafir
- Released: January 20, 1998
- Recorded: 1996–1997
- Genre: Hip hop
- Length: 50:16
- Label: Hobo; Wrap
- Producer: DJ Jay-Z; J Groove; Shock G; The Porch Monkeys

Saafir chronology
Boxcar Sessions (1994)	Trigonometry (1998)	The Hit List (1999)

Professional ratings
Review scores
Source	Rating
AllMusic	3/5 stars
RapReviews	6.5/10

Trigonometry is the second album by American rapper Saafir and his only project released under the alias Mr. No No. It was dropped on January 20, 1998, via Hobo/Wrap Records. Production was handled by DJ JZ, J Groove, Shock G and the Porch Monkeys.

== Track listing ==
All tracks are written by Reggie Gibson, except for tracks 6 and 7 written with Gregory Jacobs.

No.	Title	Writer(s)	Producer(s)	Length
1.	"I'm Saafir (The Saucee Nomad)"	Reggie Gibson	The Porch Monkeys	4:10
2.	"Major Knock"	Gibson	J-Z	4:48
3.	"Goin' Home"	Gibson	J-Z	4:52
4.	"Stay Hi"	Gibson	J-Z	4:06
5.	"JZ Theme"	Gibson	J-Z	3:40
6.	"Broad Minded"	Gibson; Gregory Jacobs	Shock G	4:55
7.	"Sendin-U-Signals"	Gibson; Jacobs	Shock G	4:03
8.	"Street Scene"	Gibson	J Groove	4:08
9.	"Birthday Suit"	Gibson	J Groove	3:02
10.	"Just Ridin'"	Gibson	J Groove	3:48
11.	"In a Vest"	Gibson	J-Z	4:16
12.	"Rock the Show"	Gibson	J-Z	4:29
Total length:				50:16

== Personnel ==
- Reggie "Saafir" Gibson — vocals, mixing (tracks: 4, 5)
- Gregory "Shock G" Jacobs — vocals, producer & mixing (tracks: 6, 7)
- Ty "Big Nous" Alston — vocals (track 12)
- H. "Poke Martian" Norris — vocals (track 12)
- Rick "Rashinel" Trammell — vocals (track 12)
- Jeremy "Jay-Z" Jackson — producer (tracks: 2–5, 11, 12), mixing (tracks: 2, 3)
- James "J Groove" Carson — producer (tracks: 8–10), mixing (track 8)
- The Porch Monkeys — producer(s) & mixing (track 1)
- Keba Konte — photography
