= Fatima Faloye =

American actress

- Born: 1973 (age 52–53); Harlem, New York City
- Citizenship: Nigeria, Barbados
- Education: New York University
- Occupation: actress
- Notable work: New York Undercover
- Relatives: Ilacoin (cousin)
- Awards: NAACP Image Award for Outstanding Supporting Actress in a Drama Series

Fatima Faloye(born in Harlem, New York City in 1973), is of Nigerian and Barbadian descent and studied at Dalton School in New York City as well as New York University. Faloye won the coveted NAACP Image Award for Outstanding Supporting Actress in a Drama Series in 1996 for her role as Chantel Tierney in New York Undercover. Faloye has also had small roles in the long-running series Law & Order. She has also worked on several short independent films as a producer and is studying to move into the director's chair. Her cousin, Christian Faloye is the Hip Hop recording artist known as Ilacoin.
