= Hip Hop (Royce da 5'9" song) =

Single by Royce da 5'9"

from the album Death Is Certain
- B-side: "Death Is Certain Pt. 2 (It Hurts)"
- Released: November 22, 2003
- Recorded: 2003
- Genre: Hip hop
- Length: 3:47
- Label: E1 Music
- Songwriters: Ryan Montgomery; Christopher Martin
- Producer: DJ Premier

Royce da 5'9" singles chronology
"Rock City" (2002)	"Hip Hop" (2003)	"Death Is Certain Pt. 2 (It Hurts)" (2004)

"Hip Hop" is a song by American rapper Royce da 5'9", released as the first single from his second studio album, Death Is Certain, which was released in 2004 through E1 Music (formerly "Koch Records"). The song is produced by DJ Premier. The single was released on November 22, 2003 in both physical and digital format. "Hip Hop" charted at #98 on the Hot R&B/Hip-Hop Singles & Tracks chart in late 2003. "Hip Hop" samples "Overture" by Jerry Goldsmith. The b-side for this single is "Death Is Certain Pt. 2 (It Hurts)".

== Music video ==
The music video to "Hip Hop" starts off in an old abandoned warehouse that Royce has refurbished into a livable place. Royce is sitting at a desk and writing a song that he raps throughout the whole video. The rest of the video shows Royce da 5'9" rapping from his sheet of paper and also different clips of him chucking different bits of songwriting paper away with lyrics that he's not completely satisfied with.

== Chart positions ==
"Hip Hop" peaked at No. 98 on the Billboard Hot R&B/Hip-Hop Singles & Tracks chart in late 2003.

Chart (2003)	Peak position
US Hot R&B/Hip-Hop Singles & Tracks (Billboard)	98

== Track listing ==
CD single

No.	Title	Writer(s)	Length
1.	"Hip Hop"	R. Montgomery and C. Martin	3:47
2.	Untitled	C. Martin
