= The Days of Pearly Spencer (album) =

Compilation album by The Vietnam Veterans
- Released: 1988
- Genre: Psychedelic rock
- Length: 66:30 (CD); 42:75 (LP)
- Language: English
- Label: Music Maniac

The Vietnam Veterans chronology
Catfish Eyes... and Tales (1987)	The Days of Pearly Spencer (1988)	Strange Girl (As The Gitanes) (2009)

The Days of Pearly Spencer is a compilation album by The Vietnam Veterans, released in 1988. It was the band's last full-length album before they broke up.

Their record label gave the following statement: "The Vietnam Veterans are no more. This album contains material which was recorded during long night sessions, but remained unreleased. With the re-recordings of the old 'demo' songs, they want to prove that they are better than ever. Now it's time to die!"

The Vietnam Veterans have later come to life again, and released a new full-length album in 2009.

== Track listing ==
# CD/LP	Title	Writer(s)	Length
1 / A1	"The Days of Pearly Spencer"	David McWilliams	4:22
2 / A2	"500 Miles"	Hedy West	5:54
3 / A3	"Is This Really the Time"	Mark Enbatta	3:18
4 / A4	"Burning Temples"	Mark Enbatta	4:19
5 / A5	"Don't Try to Walk on Me"	Mark Enbatta	3:39
6 / B1	"Dogs"	Mark Enbatta	4:43
7 / B2	"You're Gonna Fall"	Mark Enbatta	3:59
8 / B3	"Dreams of Today"	Mark Enbatta	6:18
9 / B4	"Be My Baby"	Ellie Greenwich, Jeff Barry, Phil Spector	6:01
10	"The Trip" (CD only)	Kim Fowley	23:53

== Label ==
This album was released by Music Maniac Records, Germany
