= Game Tested, Streets Approved =

Studio album by Black Rob
- Released: July 26, 2011
- Recorded: 2010–11
- Genre: Hip hop
- Length: 50:05
- Label: Duck Down
- Producer: Black Rob; Buckwild; Coptic; David Shapiro; DJ Pain 1; D'Mile; Gerald "Soul G." Stevens; Jermaine Washington; Self; Spank; Young McFly

Black Rob chronology
The Black Rob Report (2005)	Game Tested, Streets Approved (2011)	Life Story 2 (2023)

Game Tested, Streets Approved is the third studio album by American rapper Black Rob. It was released on July 26, 2011, through Duck Down Music, making it his final studio album during his lifetime. The album was produced by Coptic, Buckwild, David Shapiro, DJ Pain 1, D'Mile, Gerald "Soul G." Stevens, Jermaine Washington, Self, Spank, Young McFly, and Black Rob, who also served as executive producer with Jemal Mosley. It features a lone guest appearance from Sean Price. The album peaked at number 44 on the Billboard Top R&B/Hip-Hop Albums in the United States.

== Background ==
The album was his first since The Black Rob Report, which was released six year earlier in 2005. Shortly after the release of that album, Black Rob was sentenced to seven years in prison for grand larceny and served four years of that sentence before being released in 2010. After his release from prison, Rob cut ties with his previous label Bad Boy Records and signed a deal with independent rap label, Duck Down Music Inc. and began work on Game Tested, Streets Approved.

== Critical reception ==
Professional ratings
Aggregate scores
Source	Rating
Metacritic	62/100
Review scores
Source	Rating
HipHopDX	2/5
PopMatters	6/10
RapReviews	6.5/10
XXL	3/5

Game Tested, Streets Approved was met with generally favorable reviews from music critics. At Metacritic, which assigns a normalized rating out of 100 to reviews from mainstream publications, the album received an average score of 62, based on five reviews.

Daniel Oh of RapReviews found "no visible rust on Game Tested, Streets Approved, Rob's first album in six years". In his mixed review, David Amidon of PopMatters wrote: "ultimately, Game Tested & Street Approved is all about tracks three through eight, with the rest of it meandering through various forms of decent and straight up awful". Mark Lelinwalla of XXL wrote: "with his gruff tone and no-nonsense flow, Rob holds down 14 tracks with only one guest appearance without any problems". Amanda Bass of HipHopDX resumed: "there is more to Black Rob than "Whoa," but there is nothing that quite lives up to it on Game Tested, Streets Approved".

== Track listing ==
No.	Title	Producer(s)	Length
1.	"Welcome Back"	Anthony "Buckwild" Best	3:04
2.	"Boiling Water"	Dernst "D'Mile" Emile II	4:02
3.	"Bumpin'"	Edward "Self Service" Hinson	2:40
4.	"Can't Make It in NY"	Jermaine "O.Z.10037" Washington	2:57
5.	"Showin Up"	Nicholas "Young McFly" Greer	3:52
6.	"Celebration"	David Shapiro	3:41
7.	"Wanna Get Dough"	Eric "Coptic" Matlock	4:07
8.	"Get Involved"	Spank	4:11
9.	"Sand to the Beach"	Gerald "Soul G." Stevens	4:04
10.	"Made Me a Man"	Anthony "Buckwild" Best	4:14
11.	"Fuck Em'"	Eric "Coptic" Matlock	2:47
12.	"This is What It Is"	Black Rob	3:16
13.	"Up North - This is What It Is"	Black Rob	3:54
14.	"No Fear" (featuring Sean Price)	Eric "Coptic" Matlock; DJ Pain 1	3:16
Total length:			50:05

== Personnel ==
- Robert "Black Rob" Ross — vocals, producer (tracks: 12, 13), executive producer
- Sean Price — vocals (track 14)
- Anthony "Buckwild" Best — producer (tracks: 1, 10)
- Dernst "D'Mile" Emile II — producer (track 2)
- Edward "Self Service" Hinson — producer (track 3), mixing
- Jermaine "O.Z.10037" Washington — producer (track 4)
- Nicholas "Young McFly" Greer — producer (track 5)
- David Shapiro — producer (track 6)
- Eric "Coptic" Matlock — producer (tracks: 7, 11, 14), mixing, A&R
- M. "Spank" Gremillion — producer (track 8)
- Gerald "Soul G." Stevens — producer (track 9)
- Pacal "DJ Pain 1" Bayley — producer (track 14)
- Jemal Mosley — executive producer
- Drew "Dru-Ha" Friedman — associate executive producer
- Kenyatta "Buckshot" Blake — associate executive producer
- Robert "G Koop" Mandell — guitar, keyboards, bass, percussion
- Joseph "Bishop" Gallo — engineering, mixing
- Matt Castillo — engineering assistant
- Noah Friedman — project coordinator

== Charts ==
Chart (2011)	Peak position
US Top R&B/Hip-Hop Albums (Billboard)	44
