= Death Is Certain =

Studio album by Royce da 5'9"
- Released: February 24, 2004
- Recorded: 2002–2004
- Studio: Isolation Records; Nation Studios (Detroit, MI); MPA Studios
- Genre: Hip hop
- Length: 50:36
- Label: Koch
- Producer: Akino Childrey (exec.); Royce da 5'9" (exec.); Carlos "Six July" Broady (also exec.); Asar; DJ Premier; Mark Bassin; Reef; Ty Fyffe

Royce da 5'9" chronology
Rock City (2002)	Death Is Certain (2004)	Independent's Day (2005)

Singles from Death Is Certain
- 1. "Hip Hop" Released: November 22, 2003; 2. "Death Is Certain Pt. 2 (It Hurts)" Released: February 11, 2004

Death Is Certain is the second studio album by American rapper Royce da 5'9". It was released on February 24, 2004, through Koch Records. Recording sessions took place from December 2002 to January 2004 at Isolation Records, at Nation Studios in Detroit, and at MPA Studios. The majority of the album's production was handled by Carlos "6 July" Broady of Bad Boy Records production team The Hitmen. Other producers contributed to the album are Jason "Asar" Qualls, Ty Fyffe, Rob "Reef" Tewlow, Mark Bassin, and DJ Premier, who produced the album's lead single "Hip Hop". It features guest appearances from Ingrid Smalls, 6 July, Cha Cha and Cutty Mack. The album peaked at number 161 on the Billboard 200 and number 39 on the Top R&B/Hip-Hop Albums.

== Background ==
Released two years after his official debut Rock City, Royce spent his two-year hiatus entangled in a beef with fellow Detroit natives and former allies, D12. Due in part to a battle with depression, Death Is Certain features a sound considerably darker than that heard on his debut. Royce's new sound garnered him considerable acclaim for the album, with most critics calling Death Is Certain his strongest effort. The album is also noted by many listeners to contain both 2Pac and The Notorious B.I.G. influences in Royce's lyrics.

Later, Royce said he can't listen to the album because it takes him "to a dark place and a dark time". About the process during the production of it: "I like the fact that album happened. It taught me a lot about the creative process. I had no choice but to be honest. I didn't go into that album the way I go into albums now, where I know exactly what I need to be doing as an artist. I know not to reach for anything, to just be myself. To be honest and be transparent, that's what I like to do. That's what I feel will resonate the best. That's what I did with Death Is Certain, but I didn't plan to. It was like I was stuck in that mode. I was going through so much. We actually did that album, me and Six July, we did that album in like two weeks. Six of those songs I did within the first couple of days. That was the first batch of beats he played me. I remember they went to the titty bar, and I was just writing all of them. Knocking them down real quick. It was like, so much on my mind, I don't even think I was focused on being super lyrical. [laughs] I was just spilling. Just spilling shit. And I was super drunk".

== Critical reception ==
Professional ratings
Review scores
Source	Rating
AllMusic	3/5 stars
HipHopDX	4/5
Now	3/5 Ns
Prefix	8/10
RapReviews	8.5/10
The Source	4/5 stars
Stylus Magazine	C
Vibe	3.5/5

Death Is Certain was met with generally positive reviews. At Album of the Year, which assigns a normalized rating out of 100 to reviews from professional critics, the album received an average score of 70, based on four reviews.

== Royce Da 5'9"'s thoughts on the album ==
In an interview, Royce da 5'9" shares that revisiting Death Is Certain is tough for him: "My second time, I can't listen to that at all. It takes me back to a dark place and a dark time." He emphasizes the rawness of the album, explaining, "I was just spilling shit. And I was super drunk." The album was created in a rushed, almost cathartic manner, with most of it written in just two weeks. He didn't approach it with the same level of planning he does now, stating, "I didn't go into that album the way I go into albums now, where I know exactly what I need to be doing as an artist."

Despite its success, he doesn't find it frustrating that the album became so revered. Instead, he reflects, "It taught me a lot about the creative process. I had no choice but to be honest." For him, "Most of the shit I know now, I learned from making mistakes." Royce sees the album as a turning point, where his vulnerability became his strength.

== Track listing ==
No.	Title	Writer(s)	Producer(s)	Length
1.	"Intro"			0:12
2.	"Regardless"	Ryan Montgomery; Carlos Broady	6 July	3:01
3.	"Throw Back" (featuring Ingrid Smalls)	Montgomery; Tyrone Fyffe	Ty Fyffe	4:17
4.	"What I Know"	Montgomery; Rob Tewlow	Reef	2:49
5.	"I Promise" (featuring Ingrid Smalls)	Montgomery; Broady	6 July	3:54
6.	"Call Me Never!" (Skit)		Asar	1:59
7.	"Hip Hop"	Montgomery; Chris Martin	DJ Premier	3:47
8.	"Gangsta" (featuring Cutty Mack)	Montgomery; Broady	6 July	4:42
9.	"T.O.D.A.Y" (featuring Ingrid Smalls)	Montgomery; Broady	6 July	3:55
10.	"I & Me"	Montgomery; Jason Qualls	Asar	3:28
11.	"Beef"	Montgomery; Broady; Mark Bassin	6 July; Mark Bassin	4:19
12.	"Bomb 1st"	Montgomery; Qualls	Asar	2:59
13.	"Everybody Goes" (featuring Ingrid Smalls)	Montgomery; Broady	6 July	3:05
14.	"Death Is Certain Pt. 2 (It Hurts)" (featuring Ingrid Smalls and Cha Cha)	Montgomery; Broady	6 July	4:12
15.	"Something's Wrong With Him" (featuring 6 July)	Montgomery; Broady	6 July	3:57
Total length:				50:36

Sample credits

- "Regardless" samples "Love and Happiness" by Al Green and contains re-sung elements of "Lose Yourself" by Eminem
- "Hip Hop" samples "Overture" by Jerry Goldsmith
- "I & Me" contains re-sung elements of "Against All Odds" by 2Pac
- "T.O.D.A.Y." samples "Ike's Mood 1" by Isaac Hayes and contains re-sung elements of "B.I.G. Interlude" by The Notorious B.I.G.
- "Beef" contains re-sung elements of "What's Beef" by The Notorious B.I.G.

== Charts ==
Chart (2004)	Peak position
US Billboard 200	161
US Top R&B/Hip-Hop Albums (Billboard)	39
US Independent Albums (Billboard)	5
US Heatseekers Albums (Billboard)	4
