= Jimmy and the Soulblazers =

US band

Jimmy and The Soul Blazers
- Also known as: Clockwork, Change, The Joneses
- Origin: Alliance, Ohio
- Genres: R&B, soul, funk, soft rock
- Years active: 1966–present
- Labels: Kapp, Greene Bottle Records, Homespun Records
- Members: Jimmy Korleski, Bill McCrea, Mike Bugara, John Sineri, George Nutial, Jim Nero, Dave Sorge, Brian Burse, David-Kolinski-Schultz, Bob Hoefler
- Past members: Mike Duruttya, Bill White, John Fugate, Tom Stebbins, Gary Zeigler, John Adams, Bill Hawley
- Website: Official website

Jimmy and The Soul Blazers (also known as Change and Clockwork) are an American soul and funk band from Alliance, Ohio. Since 1966 they have played for audiences across the East Coast and Midwest of the United States.

== Career ==
Signed with Kapp Records (a division of MCA Records, now Universal Music Group) in 1970 as Change, they released two singles. In 1972, they called themselves The Joneses, and combined their Motown and R&B with more rock songs and their own compositions. Although they were still performing as The Joneses, in 1973 they released a supposedly self-titled album of original songs and covers, Clockwork on Greene Bottle Records, a division of Famous Music. Clockwork was re-released in 2010, on Rick Cassidy's Homespun Records label.

Their vocals and musicianship have kept them a regional favorite for many years. In 2002, a new album, It's About Time, was released. A mixture of Motown hits with a few lesser known soul tunes, it also featured the Soul Blazers' longtime cover of "Goin' Out of My Head" a Little Anthony tune, "With A Little Help From My Friends", a Joe Cocker cover, and a cover of "Grazin' In The Grass." They also have added a horn section to their lineup. The band has spawned other groups such as Copperfield...Avenue...Agatha Brooke....PW Blues Band ...Sorge Brothers Band...and Groove Warehaus.

They have been the opening act for Martha Reeves & the Vandellas, the O'Jays, Smokey Robinson & the Miracles, Three Dog Night, Uriah Heep, Gladys Knight & the Pips, Sly & the Family Stone, James Gang, Jr. Walker and the All Stars, the Four Tops, Ray Charles, Frankie Valli, and Mitch Ryder & the Detroit Wheels.

On 29 October 2016, a celebration concert was held marking the band's 50th year together. During the event the band not only received congratulatory notes from notable musicians including Martha Reeves, The Young Rascals, The Shirelles, and Chubby Checker, they were also presented with commendations from Ohio Governor John. R. Kasich and the Ohio House of Representatives.

== Current lineup ==
- Jimmy Korleski – Lead Vocals, Composer (original member)
- Dave Sorge – Guitar, Vocals (original member)
- Jim Nero – Bass guitar, Vocals
- George Nutial – Keyboards, Vocals (from the Commonwealth)
- Mike Bugara – Guitar, Vocals, Composer (from the Commonwealth)
- Johnny Sineri – Drums (from the Commonwealth)
- Brian Burse – Trumpet
- David Kolinski-Schultz – Soprano/Tenor/Baritone Saxophones, Arranger
- Bob Hoefler – Trombone

== Former members ==
- Bill White – Organ
- Ken Baker - Guitar, vocals
- John Fugate – Bass guitar (original member)
- Gary Zeigler – Bass
- Bill Hawley – Bass
- John Adams – Guitar, Vocals
- Tom Stubbins – Keyboards and Trumpet
- Mike Duruttya – Saxophone, Vocals, Composer (original member)
- Bill McCrea – Congas, Vocals, Composer (original member)

== Discography ==
=== Singles ===
- "Santa Fe Stage" (Sabatino, Marshall) / "Ballad of Oliver David Jones (1st Movement)" (McCrea, Bugara) – Change, Kapp Records (MCA/UMG) (Kapp 2157), 1971
- "Country Side Woman" (McCrea, Bugara) / "Hitchcock Railway (Live at the Agora)" (Dunn, McCashen) – Change, Kapp Records (MCA/UMG) (Kapp 2181), 1972

=== Albums ===
- CHANGE, 1971 Kapp (unreleased)
  - 1."Constant Light" (M.Duruttya, D.Sorge)
  - 2."In My Garden" (M.Bugara, W.McCrea)
  - 3."Look The Other Way" (M.Duruttya, D.Sorge)
  - 4."Long Journey" (M.Bugara, W.McCrea)
  - 5."For The Rest of My Life" (M.Duruttya, D.Sorge)
  - 6."Movin On" (M.Duruttya, D.Sorge, J.Korleski)
  - 7."Change Jam" (M.Bugara, D.Sorge)
  - 8."Stop Look And Listen" (M.Bugara, W.McCrea)
  - 9."Tomorrow" (M.Bugara, W.McCrea)
- Clockwork (LP) Greene Bottle Records (GBS 1013), 1973, (CD) Homespun Records 2010
  - 1."Music Box" (M. Bugara / B. McCrea) Bill McCrea, Lead Vocals
  - 2."Hazy Shade of Winter" (P. Simon) Jimmy Korleski / Mike Duruttya, Lead Vocals
  - 3."Nothing Left For Me" (M. Bugara / B. McCrea) Bill McCrea, Lead Vocals
  - 4."Hitchcock Railway" (D.L. Dunn / T.L. McCashew) Mike Duruttya, Lead Vocal
  - 5."After Today" (J. Korleski) Jimmy Korleski, Lead Vocals
  - 6."Now That You Know" (M. Duruttya) Mike Duruttya, Lead Vocals
  - 7."Bye Bye Lady" (M. Duruttya / J. Korleski) Jimmy Korleski, Lead Vocals
  - 8."Country Side Woman" (M. Bugara / B. McCrea) Bill McCrea, Lead Vocals
  - 9."Rock "N" Roll Woman" (S. Stills) Mike Duruttya, Lead Vocals
- It's About Time (CD), 2002 (Self Published)
  - 1."What Are You Gonna Do When I'm Gone" (W. Robinson Jr.)
  - 2."Turn Back The Hands of Time" (J. Daniels / J. Moore)
  - 3."I'm So Glad I Found You" (G. Kerr / L. Roberts / V. Kern)
  - 4."Grazin' In The Grass" (P. Hou / H. Elston)
  - 5."Going Out of My Head" (Cook / Quenton / Leo)
  - 6."Ain't That Peculiar" (Moore / Robinson / Rogers / Tarpin)
  - 7."Ain't No Sun Since You've Been Gone" (S. May / N. Whitfield / C. Grant)
  - 8."Come Get These Memories" (Holland / Dozier / Holland)
  - 9."With A Little Help From My Friends" (Lennon / McCartney)
  - 10."With This Ring" (R. Wylie / L. Dixon / T. Hester)
  - 11."Take Me in Your Arms" (Holland / Dozier / Holland)
  - 12."Cowboys To Girls" (Gamble / Huff)
  - 13."Baby I'm For Real" (A. Gaye / M. Gaye)
  - 14."Playin' With My Friends" (Cray / Walker)
