= Rock City (Royce da 5'9" album) =

Studio album by Royce da 5'9"
- Released: November 26, 2002
- Recorded: 1999–2000
- Genre: Hip hop
- Length: 1:01:45
- Label: Columbia (original version); Koch; Game (Version 2.0)
- Producer: 6 July; Ayatollah; DJ Premier; Doc Soose; Eminem (exec.); Nashiem Myrick; Red Spyda; Reef; Royce da 5'9" (co-exec.); The Neptunes; Trackmasters; Ty Fyffe

Royce da 5'9" chronology
| Rock City (2002) | Death Is Certain (2004) |

Singles from Rock City
- 1. "Boom" Released: December 14, 1999; 2. "You Can't Touch Me" Released: April 26, 2000; 3. "Rock City" Released: January 5, 2002

Professional ratings
Review scores
| Source | Rating |
|---|---|
| AllMusic | 4/5 stars |
| HipHopDX | (favorable) |
| RapReviews | 8/10 |
| Vibe | 3.5/5 stars |

Rock City (subtitled or alternative titled Rock City - Version 2.0) is the debut studio album by American rapper Royce da 5'9". After a two-year delay, resulting from a creative issue and label changes, the album was released on November 26, 2002.

== Background ==
Originally receiving national attention for his appearance on Eminem's track, "Bad Meets Evil", which later launched the duo of the same name in 1999, Royce da 5'9" was cornered by Dr. Dre to join his imprint, Aftermath Entertainment, but he refused to fire his manager. After he was rejected, he later signed a development deal with Tommy Boy Records, which later fell through due to the fact that he learned that the label would own his publishing and master recordings for the following ten years by contract. Recording for the album began in 1999, after signing with Game Recordings, with the single, "Boom". In 2000, after signing with Columbia Records, the album's recording process began to dwindle when the label demanded radio-friendly singles; something Royce was not keen to create.

Completed by October, it suffered numerous delays from December 2000 to November 2001, due to internal conflicts with label Columbia Records. As a result, in December 2001, Royce da 5'9" was dropped from the label and signed with Koch Records (now MNRK Music Group). In February 2002, the original version of the album was released promotionally outside of the United States without Royce's personal or legal authority. He threatened to take legal action against Columbia's parent, Sony Music, but ultimately did not do it.

Ultimately, Royce had to re-recorded a majority of the album, with tracks removed due to Sony owning rights to the content. Therefore, the album had to foresee a November 26, 2002 release date under Game Recordings and Koch Records. The subtitle, Version 2.0, was also added, due to the rearrangements.

In mid-2023, the original version of Rock City leaked online and on digital music services.

== Chart performance ==
The album debuted and peaked at number twenty-nine on the Billboard Top R&B/Hip-Hop Albums chart.

== Track listing ==
- The album was released in many versions. Most notable of them is Version 2.0
- The track listing is for Version 2.0

| No. | Title | Producer(s) | Length |
|---|---|---|---|
| 1. | "It's Tuesday (Intro)" | Nashiem Myrick; Lee Stone | 3:02 |
| 2. | "Rock City" (featuring Eminem) | Red Spyda | 4:14 |
| 3. | "Off Parole" (featuring Tre Little) | The Neptunes | 6:05 |
| 4. | "My Friend" | DJ Premier | 3:30 |
| 5. | "You Can't Touch Me" | Trackmasters | 3:56 |
| 6. | "Mr. Baller" (featuring Clipse, Pharrell and Tre Little) | The Neptunes | 4:26 |
| 7. | "Let's Go" (featuring Twista) | 6 July | 4:18 |
| 8. | "D-Elite" | Ty Fyffe | 1:42 |
| 9. | "Take His Life" (featuring Tre Little) | Reef | 4:21 |
| 10. | "Nickel Nine Is..." | Reef | 4:56 |
| 11. | "Boom" | DJ Premier | 3:56 |
| 12. | "Soldier's Story" | Reef | 4:18 |
| 13. | "Who Am I" | 6 July | 3:44 |
| 14. | "Life" (featuring Amerie) | Ayatollah | 5:20 |
| 15. | "King of Kings" | Doc Soose | 4:06 |

=== Notes ===
"Get'cha Paper", "We Live (Danger)", "D-Elite Part 2", "She's the One" and "What Would You Do" from his original album do not appear on Version 2.0.

=== Samples ===
- "My Friend" samples "Let's Have Some Fun" by The Bar-Kays, "Cross My Heart" by Killah Priest
- "Nickel Nine Is..." samples "I'll Live My Love for You" by Millie Jackson
- "Boom" samples "Forever Is a Long, Long Time" by Marc Hannibal, "Anthology" by Kay-Gees, "You Know My Steez" by Gang Starr, "Afro Puffs" by The Lady of Rage
- "Who Am I" samples "Livin Inside Your Love" by Earl Klugh
- "Life" samples "Woman in Love" by Barbra Streisand
- "You Can't Touch Me" samples "Love and Happiness" by Al Green
- "King of Kings" samples "Distant Land" by Traci Lords

== Chart positions ==
=== Album ===
| Chart (2002) | Peak position |
|---|---|
| US Independent Albums (Billboard) | 7 |
| US Top R&B/Hip-Hop Albums (Billboard) | 29 |

=== Singles ===
| Year | Song | Chart positions | |
|---|---|---|---|
| Year | Song | Hot R&B/Hip-Hop Singles & Tracks | Hot Rap Singles |
| 1999 | "Boom" | - | 48 |
| 2000 | "You Can't Touch Me" | 66 | - |
| 2002 | "Rock City" | 99 | - |
