= Boxcar Sessions =

Studio album by Saafir
- Released: 1994
- Recorded: 1993–94
- Studio: Pajama (Oakland, CA)
- Genre: West Coast hip hop
- Length: 58:38
- Label: Qwest/Reprise/Warner Bros. 45602
- Producer: Big Nose; DJ Jay-Z; J Groove

Saafir chronology
Boxcar Sessions (1994)	Trigonometry (1998)

Singles from Boxcar Sessions
- 1. "Light Sleeper" Released: June 30, 1994; 2. "Just Riden'" Released: February 7, 1995

Boxcar Sessions is the debut studio album by American rapper Saafir. It was released in 1994 via Qwest Records. The recording sessions took place at Pajama Recording Studios in Oakland, California. The production was handled by DJ Jay-Z, J Groove and Big Nose, with Sleuth and Saafir serving as executive producers. It features guest appearances from Big Nous, King Saan, Poke Martian and Rashinel.

== Critical reception ==
Professional ratings
Review scores
Source	Rating
AllMusic	3/5 stars
RapReviews	7.5/10

Trouser Press wrote that the album "has promisingly jazz-flecked beats and a pleasant flow, but the rapper’s lyrics are hollow, crude and obnoxious."

Alex Henderson of AllMusic compared Saafir's musical style favorably to such celebrated hip hop artists as A Tribe Called Quest, De La Soul, Digable Planets, and the Pharcyde. Henderson stated that "between Saafir's rapping style and the jazzy production, Boxcar Sessions is fairly fresh sounding."

== Track listing ==
No.	Title	Writer(s)	Producer(s)	Length
1.	"Grab the Train"	Reggie Gibson; Jeremy Jackson	J-Z	1:21
2.	"Swig of the Stew"	Gibson; Jackson	J-Z	3:58
3.	"Poke Martian"	Henry Norris; Jackson	J-Z	0:52
4.	"Playa Hayta"	Gibson; James Carson	J Groove	3:36
5.	"Pee Wee"	Jackson	J-Z	2:50
6.	"Battle Drill"	Gibson; Carson	J Groove	3:58
7.	"Westside" (featuring King Saan)			1:05
8.	"Worship the 'D'"	Gibson; Jackson	J-Z	4:05
9.	"Light Sleeper"	Gibson; Jackson	J-Z	3:28
10.	"Rashinet"	Rick Trammell; Ty Alston	Big Nous	1:34
11.	"Can U Feel Me?"	Gibson; Jackson	J-Z	3:50
12.	"No Return (Goin' Crazy)"	Gibson; Jackson	J-Z	4:34
13.	"Big Nose"	Alston	Big Nous	3:28
14.	"Just Riden'"	Gibson; Jackson	J-Z	3:39
15.	"Hype Shit"	Gibson; Carson; K-Top	J Groove	2:53
16.	"Real Circus"	Gibson; Jackson	J-Z	4:12
17.	"Bent"	Gibson; Carson; R. Sharper	J Groove	4:29
18.	"The Instructor"	Gibson; Jackson	J-Z	0:45
19.	"Joint Custody"	Gibson; Carson	J Groove	4:01
Total length:				58:38

== Personnel ==
- Reggie "Saafir" Gibson — vocals, mixing (tracks: 3, 4, 8, 9, 12, 15–19), executive producer
- H. "Poke Martian" Norris — vocals (track 3)
- Hasaan "King Saan" Mahmoud — vocals (track 7)
- Rick "Rashinel" Trammell — vocals & mixing (track 10)
- Ty "Big Nous" Alston — vocals (track 13), producer & mixing (tracks: 10, 13)
- Jeremy "Jay-Z" Jackson — producer & mixing (tracks: 1–3, 5, 8, 9, 11, 12, 14, 16, 18)
- James "J Groove" Carson — producer (tracks: 4, 6, 15, 17, 19), mixing (tracks: 4, 17, 19)
- Crayge Lindesay — engineering
- Brian "Big Bass" Gardner — mastering
- Neil "Sleuth" Johnson — executive producer, management
- Kevin Hosmann — art direction
- Victor Hall — photography
