= Independent's Day =

Studio album by Royce da 5'9"
- Released: June 28, 2005
- Recorded: 2004–05
- Studio: MPA Studios
- Genre: Hip hop
- Length: 58:51
- Label: M.I.C. TBL 5960
- Producer: Akino Childrey (exec.); Royce da 5'9" (exec.); Carlos "6 July" Broady (also exec.); Asar; Great Scott; K.I.D.D.; Nottz

Royce da 5'9" chronology
Death Is Certain (2004)	Independent's Day (2005)	Street Hop (2009)

Professional ratings
Review scores
Source	Rating
RapReviews	7.5/10

Independent's Day is the third studio album by American rapper Royce da 5'9". It was released on June 28, 2005 through M.I.C Records. Production was handled by K.I.D.D., Great Scott, Nottz, Asar, and Carlos "6 July" Broady, who also served as executive producer together with Akino Childrey and Royce. It features guest appearances from Ingrid Smalls, Street Lord Juan, Big Herk, Blade Icewood, CeeLo Green, Jay Black, K-Doe, Kid Vishis, La the Darkman, Sara Stokes and Yo Gotti.

== Recording ==
Main recording sessions took place at MPA Studios in Canton, Michigan. According to Royce, "Independent's Day is not just this album's title. It's a mind state. All the artists chosen to be collaborators are unsigned or independent and have been bubbling. We plan to take that underground buzz and put them over the radar".

== Track listing ==
No.	Title	Writer(s)	Producer(s)	Length
1.	"Intro"			0:29
2.	"I Owe You"	Ryan Montgomery; Carlos Broady	Carlos "Six July" Broady	4:24
3.	"Ride" (featuring Big Herk, Juan and Ingrid Smalls)	R. Montgomery; Amery Dennard; DaJuan Wren	K.I.D.D.	4:14
4.	"Wet My Whistle" (featuring Sara Stokes, Breezy Brie and Squeeze)	R. Montgomery; Sara Stokes; Walter Scott; James Terry	Great Scott; James Terry (co.)	3:36
5.	"Politics" (featuring CeeLo Green)	R. Montgomery; Thomas Callaway; Dominick Lamb	Nottz	4:37
6.	"Looking at My Dog" (featuring Yo Gotti and Ingrid Smalls)	R. Montgomery; Mario Mims; Broady	Carlos "Six July" Broady	4:32
7.	"Right Back" (featuring Juan and Kid Vishis)	R. Montgomery; Wren; Marcus Montgomery	K.I.D.D.	3:40
8.	"Skit"			0:37
9.	"Blow Dat…"	R. Montgomery; Lamb	Nottz	3:50
10.	"Chips on Pistons" (featuring Blade Icewood, Ingrid Smalls and Jay Black)	R. Montgomery; Darnell Lyndsey; Ingrid Smalls	K.I.D.D.	4:25
11.	"Skit"			0:36
12.	"Fuck My Brains Out" (featuring June and Ingrid Smalls)	R. Montgomery	K.I.D.D.	3:31
13.	"Independent's Day"	R. Montgomery; Broady	Carlos "Six July" Broady	3:47
14.	"Meeting of the Bosses"	R. Montgomery; Broady	Carlos "Six July" Broady	4:01
15.	"Skit"			0:32
16.	"Paranoia" (featuring La the Darkman)	R. Montgomery; Làson Jackson; Jason Qualls	Asar	3:54
17.	"Lay It Down" (featuring Juan and K-Doe)	R. Montgomery; Wren; Ernie K-Doe; Scott; Terry	Great Scott; James Terry (co.)	4:18
18.	"Yeah" (featuring Ingrid Smalls)	R. Montgomery; Broady	Carlos "Six July" Broady	3:48
Total length:				58:51

== Personnel ==
- Ryan "Royce da 5'9"" Montgomery – main artist, executive producer
- Amery "Big Herk" Dennard – featured artist (track 3)
- DaJuan Wren – featured artist (tracks: 3, 7, 17)
- Ingrid Smalls – featured artist (tracks: 3, 6, 10, 12, 18)
- Sara Stokes – featured artist (track 4)
- Breezy Brie – featured artist (track 4)
- Squeeze – featured artist (track 4)
- Thomas "CeeLo Green" Callaway – featured artist (track 5)
- Mario "Yo Gotti" Mims – featured artist (track 6)
- Marcus "Kid Vishis" Montgomery – featured artist (track 7)
- Darnell "Blade Icewood" Lyndsey – featured artist (track 10)
- Jay Black – featured artist (track 10)
- June a.k.a. Jah The 5'9 – featured artist (track 12)
- Làson "La the Darkman" Jackson – featured artist (track 16)
- Ernie K-Doe – featured artist (track 17)
- Chuck Alkazian – additional live drums (track 2), mixing (tracks: 2–7, 9, 10, 12–14, 16–18)
- Carlos "Six July" Broady – producer (tracks: 2, 6, 13, 14, 18), mixing (tracks: 2–7, 9, 10, 12–14, 17, 18), executive producer
- K.I.D.D. – producer (tracks: 3, 7, 10, 12)
- Walter "Great" Scott – producer (tracks: 4, 17)
- James Terry – co-producer (tracks: 4, 17)
- Dominick "Nottz" Lamb – producer (tracks: 5, 9)
- Jason "Asar" Qualls – producer (track 16), recording (tracks: 2, 4, 6, 10, 12–14, 16), engineering
- Ryan "West" Hyland – recording (tracks: 3–5, 7, 9, 10, 12, 17), engineering
- Rob Nelson – recording (track 18)
- Larry Nix – mastering
- Akino "Kino" Childrey – executive producer
- Delmore Uto – artwork, design
- Jeremiah "DJ Mumbles" Otto – artwork, design
- Brian Horn – photography
- Scottie Rosner – A&R
- Kefing "KC" Cowans – A&R
