= Days of Pearly Spencer =

1967 single by David McWilliams

Single by David McWilliams

from the album David McWilliams Vol. 2
- A-side: "Harlem Lady"
- Released: 6 October 1967
- Genre: Baroque pop; psychedelic pop
- Label: Major Minor
- Songwriter: David McWilliams
- Producer: Mike Leander

David McWilliams singles chronology
"God and My Country" (1967)	"Days of Pearly Spencer" (1967)	"This Side of Heaven" (1968)

Official audio
- "Days of Pearly Spencer" on YouTube

"Days of Pearly Spencer" (or in later releases "The Days of Pearly Spencer") is a 1967 song written and originally performed by Northern Irish singer-songwriter David McWilliams, and included on his second album David McWilliams Vol. 2. Although it charted in several countries in continental Europe and in Australia, the original version was not a chart success in either the United Kingdom or Ireland. The song was rerecorded by McWilliams with a new arrangement in his album Working for the Government (1987). In 1992, a cover version by English pop singer Marc Almond reached number four on the UK Singles Chart and number eight in Ireland.

== Background and recording ==
Having his first single, "God and My Country", flop, McWilliams entered a Belfast recording studio to record some demos. Around that time, Mervyn Solomon overheard his tapes, and was impressed enough to telephone his brother Phil Solomon. Because McWilliams was already signed to CBS, who manufactured Major Minor's recordings, Phil Solomon offered to take McWilliams off their hands. The offer was accepted, and Solomon took McWilliams with him to London to record the song. Originally, the song was a poignant ballad. The title was presumably a play of words on a line from the Victorian hymn, "We rest on thee", "the gates of pearly splendour".

The song had, according to Stuart Bailie of BBC Radio Ulster, a "flickering, almost documentary style" in which it took listeners to the more run-down parts of Ballymena where people walked through rubble bare-foot looking old beyond their years. Due to the title of the song, many listeners believed that the song pertained to an individual harrowed by a poor lifestyle and poor-quality alcohol; McWilliams said he had written the song about a homeless man encountered in Ballymena. Some of those close to McWilliams, however, claimed he was writing about two ladies from his hometown.

The recording was produced by Mike Leander who formed a sweeping orchestral arrangement for the song. Leander had previously provided arrangements for such records as "She's Leaving Home" by The Beatles and Marianne Faithfull's "As Tears Go By." Some of McWilliams' vocals were recorded using a telephone line from a phone box near the studio, generating a low-tech effect, and giving the song a 'strange "phoned-in" chorus'.

== Release ==
The record was originally released on 6 October 1967 as the single B-side of "Harlem Lady" on the Major Minor label, a date which coincided with the release of his second album David McWilliams Vol. 2. "Days of Pearly Spencer" received considerable exposure on Radio Caroline, of which Solomon was an executive, and in adverts in the UK music press. Double-page adverts were taken out in all the major music newspapers and the New Musical Express front page featured it, calling it "the single that will blow your mind" and the accompanying album, David McWilliams Vol. 2, "the album that will change the course of music". Adverts for it were plastered everywhere, and in 2012 Stuart Bailie of Radio Ulster remarked that "there was no getting away from David McWilliams". Advertisements for the song even appeared on double-decker buses, yet McWilliams "was walking around London without the pocket money to get on one of those buses", and one publication put the total cost of promotion at close to £20,000 (equivalent to £320,000 in 2025).

The BBC refused to play the record, however, because of Solomon's involvement in the offshore radio station Radio Caroline, and thus the record failed to chart in either the UK or the Republic of Ireland. In continental Europe, the song topped the French Singles Chart, reached number two on the Belgian Singles Chart, and reached number eight on the Dutch Singles Chart. In Australia, the song spent two weeks at number 32 on Go-Set's national top 40, reaching number 10 in Brisbane. The song was rereleased on three occasions and remains a staple of "oldies" radio stations.

The video clip created for the song contains footage of the singer playing his guitar on the wharf at the former brewery De Boog under the Vollers bridge close to the Oudegracht, the main canal in the centre of Utrecht, the Netherlands, easily recognizable for those who live(d) in that city.

== Legacy ==
Richie Unterberger described the song as "[McWilliams's] best song, with a dark edge, swirling violins, and an effective dab of psychedelia in the megaphone-distorted vocals on the song's chorus." In 2002, The Independent called the song "dreamy". In 2012, Stuart Bailie of Radio Ulster called "Harlem Lady", the A-side, a "quality tune" and "Pearly Spencer" a "remarkable record".

== Charts ==
Chart (1967–1968)	Peak position
Australia (Go-Set)	32
Australia (Kent Music Report)	42
Belgium (Ultratop 50 Flanders)	10
Belgium (Ultratop 50 Wallonia)	2
France (IFOP)	1
Italy (Musica e dischi)	14
Netherlands (Dutch Top 40)	8
Netherlands (Single Top 100)	6
Switzerland (Schweizer Hitparade)	4
US Billboard Bubbling Under Hot 100 Singles	134
US Cash Box Looking Ahead	122
US Cash Box Top 50 In R&B Locations	34
US Record World Singles Coming Up	119
US Record World Top 50 R&B	43

Chart (1976)	Peak position
West Germany (GfK)	47

== Marc Almond version ==
"The Days of Pearly Spencer"

Single by Marc Almond

from the album Tenement Symphony
- B-side: "Bruises"
- Released: April 1992
- Length: 4:23
- Label: WEA; Some Bizarre
- Songwriters: David McWilliams; Marc Almond
- Producer: Trevor Horn

Marc Almond singles chronology
"My Hand Over My Heart" (1992)	"The Days of Pearly Spencer" (1992)	"What Makes a Man a Man" (live) (1993)

A recording by English singer Marc Almond titled "The Days of Pearly Spencer", with an additional verse written by Almond giving the song a more optimistic tone, reached number four on the UK Singles Chart and number eight in Ireland in 1992. In a review from the parent album Tenement Symphony, Ned Raggett of AllMusic called it 'the surprise U.K. hit single of the bunch, the gentle and (for Trevor Horn) understated "The Days of Pearly Spencer", another '60s cover given the Almond treatment to good effect'.

=== Charts ===
==== Weekly charts ====
Chart (1992)	Peak position
Australia (ARIA)	193
Austria (Ö3 Austria Top 40)	16
Belgium (Ultratop 50 Flanders)	32
Europe (Eurochart Hot 100)	14
Germany (GfK)	21
Ireland (IRMA)	8
Netherlands (Single Top 100)	44
Sweden (Sverigetopplistan)	31
UK Singles (Official Charts)	4
UK Airplay (Music Week)	1

==== Year-end charts ====
Chart (1992)	Position
UK Airplay (Music Week)	35

== Other cover versions ==
In 1968, french composer Franck Pourcel arranged an upbeat instrumental version of "Days of Pearly Spencer", the first track on his album The Franck Pourcel Sound.

New Zealand band the Avengers had a number-four hit in that country in December 1968 with a cover version of the song; in Italy, the song was also very successfully covered in 1968 by Caterina Caselli as "Il Volto Della Vita" (with an unrelated text) reaching number four on the italian chart. In the U.S., the Grass Roots covered the song on their 1969 album Lovin' Things. Renate Kern from Germany (international a.k.a. Country-Lady Nancy Wood) recorded a german version in 1973 called "Die Antwort von den Sternen" as 4th Track of her album "Nur wer liebt". Three years later the german singer, songwriter and producer Michael Holm recorded a german version in 1976 as Single called "Am Start war Pearly Spencer". A spanish version called "Vuelo blanco de gaviota" was recorded in 1979 by Ana Belén. Successful later versions of the song included a disco version which reached number one in Belgium in the 1980s, and a cover version in 1988 by the french psychedelic band The Vietnam Veterans and their album The Days of Pearly Spencer. A version by french singer Rodolphe Burger was used in the 2012 french film "Louise Wimmer" and a french duo consisting of brothers Georges and Michel Costa as 'Trade Mark' in 1978 released a disco version (including a 12" extended mix).
