= The Black Rob Report =

Studio album by Black Rob
- Released: October 18, 2005
- Studios: Daddy's House Recording Studio (New York, NY); FBT Studios (Ferndale, MI)
- Genre: East Coast hip-hop
- Length: 1:06:58
- Label: Bad Boy
- Producers: Black Rob; Buckwild; Coptic; D-Dot; Joe Hooker; Kon Artis; Nashiem Myrick; O'Shea Hunter; Rudy Roxx; Scram Jones; Stevie J.; The Buchanans; Tony Dofat; True Master

Black Rob chronology
Life Story (2000)	The Black Rob Report (2005)	Game Tested, Streets Approved (2011)

The Black Rob Report is the second studio album by American rapper Black Rob. It was released on October 18, 2005, through Bad Boy Records, marking his sophomore and final album for the label. Recording sessions took place at Daddy's House Recording Studio in New York City and FBT Studios in Ferndale. Production was handled by Deric "D-Dot" Angelettie, Harve "Joe Hooker" Pierre, Tony Dofat, Buckwild, Coptic, Kon Artis, Nashiem Myrick, O'Shea Hunter, Rudy Roxx, Scram Jones, Stevie J., The Buchanans, True Master, and Black Rob himself. It features guest appearances from Ness, Aasim, Akon, Babs, Cali Ranks, Cheri Dennis, Chopper Young City, Craig Mack, D-Dot, Kon Artis, Louis Farrakhan, Petey Pablo, Rhea, and the late Notorious B.I.G..

A music video was made that starts with the first verse of "Star in da Hood" and then cuts to the full song "Ready".

In the United States, the album peaked at number 40 on the Billboard 200, number 10 on the Top R&B/Hip-Hop Albums and number 7 on the Top Rap Albums charts.

== Critical reception ==
Professional ratings
Review scores
Source	Rating
AllMusic	3.5/5 stars
Blender	3/5 stars
HipHopDX	3/5 stars
RapReviews	7/10
Rolling Stone	2/5 stars
Vibe	3.5/5 stars

The Black Rob Report received generally positive reviews from music critics. K.B. Tindal of HipHopDX praised Rob for his rugged ghetto tales and chemistry with the featured artists, singling out former Da Band members Chopper and Ness on "Fire in da Hole" and "Team" as the standouts, concluding that "No shiny suits for this dude at all. He is Black Rob and you either love him or hate him but he will be a Bad Boy for life so don't get it twisted. He's here to stay." AllMusic's David Jeffries said that despite the album being marred by needless skits and interludes he praised the production and Rob's lyrics for bringing back the street cred missing from recent Bad Boy releases at the time, concluding that "The Black Rob Report still comes out on top courtesy of its freewheeling attitude, sharp beats, and charismatic rapper." Steve 'Flash' Juon of RapReviews said that despite Rob's limited lyrical content not matching his technical ability he praised the production for elevating the material, saying that "A few of these songs have hit potential, and if you like Rob's simple structure and lyrics that admittedly aren't playing themselves by acting like Rob is extra hard or the biggest gangster ever, then cop this joint." Hua Hsu of Blender singled out "Help Me Out" and "Ready" as the standouts of Rob's talents but found the rest of the album not as ear-grabbing, concluding that "Rob’s fiery, ballsy verses and jailhouse cred can’t overcome his plodding, forgettable hooks, which prevent him from becoming a star anywhere else."

== Track listing ==
No.	Title	Writer(s)	Producer(s)	Length
1.	"Courtroom (Intro)"	Harve Pierre; Deric Angelettie	Joe Hooker; D-Dot	0:29
2.	"They Heard I Got Life"	Robert Ross; Tony Dofat	Tony Dofat	4:10
3.	"Watch Your Movements" (featuring Akon)	Ross; Aliaune Thiam; Dofat; S. Solomon; William Beck; Clarence Satchell; James Williams; Leroy Bonner; Marshall Jones; Marvin Pierce; Ralph Middlebrooks	Tony Dofat	4:23
4.	"Star in da Hood"	Ross; Andre Gonzalez; Jamal Johnson	The Buchanans	3:58
5.	"She's a Pro" (featuring Kon Artis)	Ross; Denaun Porter; Michael Chaverria	Kon Artis; Joe Hooker (voc.)	3:46
6.	"Where da Bypass At? (Interlude)" (featuring Petey Pablo, D-Dot and Craig Mack)	Ross; Moses Barrett III; Angelettie; Pierre	Joe Hooker; D-Dot	1:41
7.	"B.R." (featuring Cheri Dennis)	Ross; Cheri Dennis; Eric Matlock; Oshea Hunter; Austin Roberts; Kim Rose	Coptic; O'Shea Hunter; Joe Hooker (voc.)	2:29
8.	"Ready"	Ross; Rhea Dummett; Marc Shemer; Angelettie	Scram Jones	2:27
9.	"B.L.A.C.K."	Ross; Angelettie; Steven Jordan	D-Dot; Stevie J.; Zeke Black (co.)	3:04
10.	"Lights Out (Interlude)"	Ross; Angelettie; Pierre; Anthony Best	Buckwild; D-Dot; Joe Hooker	0:23
11.	"When You Come Home" (featuring Rhea)	Ross; Dummett; Best; Angelettie; Douglas Wood	Buckwild	5:23
12.	"You Know What" (featuring Louis Farrakhan)	Ross; Louis Eugene Walcott; Derrick Harris	True Master	4:00
13.	"Y'all Know Who Killed Him" (featuring The Notorious B.I.G.)	Ross; Christopher Wallace; Angelettie; Carlos Broady; Darryl McDaniels; Nashiem Myrick; Sean Combs	D-Dot; Stevie J. (co.)	3:57
14.	"Back to Live Action (Interlude)"	Ross	Joe Hooker; Black Rob	1:43
15.	"Fire in da Hole" (featuring Ness)	Ross; Lloyd Mathis; Angelettie; Dofat	D-Dot; Tony Dofat	4:08
16.	"Smile in Ya Face"	Ross; Best; Sammy Cahn; Jimmy Van Heusen	Buckwild	3:46
17.	"Warrior" (featuring Cali Ranks)	Ross; Cali Ranks; Dofat	Tony Dofat	4:05
18.	"Team" (featuring Ness, Chopper Young City, Babs and Aasim)	Ross; Mathis; Kevin Barnes; Lynese Wiley; Leroy Watson; Dofat	Tony Dofat; Joe Hooker (voc.)	4:23
19.	"Help Me Out"	Ross; Angelettie; Rudell Johnson	D-Dot; Rudy Roxx; Bird Baby (co.)	3:54
20.	"Courtroom Skit"	Ross	Joe Hooker; D-Dot	0:23
21.	"Long Live B.R."	Ross; Myrick; Raeford Gerald	Nashiem "Hard White" Myrick	4:18
22.	"The Verdict"	Ross; Pierre; Angelettie	Joe Hooker; D-Dot	0:20
Total length:				1:06:58

Sample credits

- Track 3 contains a sample of the recording "Good Luck Charm" written by William Beck, Clarence Satchell, James Williams, Leroy "Sugarfoot" Bonner, Marshall "Rock" Jones, Marvin Pierce and Ralph Middlebrooks as performed by the Ohio Players.
- Track 7 contains a sample of "Why Can't She See Me" written by George Austin Robertson Jr. and Kim Rose as performed by Austin Roberts.
- Track 11 contains a sample from "Robotics" written and performed by Douglas Wood.
- Track 13 contains excerpts from "My Downfall" written by Carlos Broady, Christopher Wallace, Darryl McDaniels, Nashiem Myrick and Sean Combs as performed by The Notorious B.I.G.
- Track 16 contains samples from "All The Way" written by Sammy Cahn and Jimmy Van Heusen as performed by David Porter.
- Track 21 contains a sample of "Friends Or Lovers" written by Raeford Gerald as performed by Act One.

== Charts ==
Chart (2005)	Peak position
US Billboard 200	40
US Top R&B/Hip-Hop Albums (Billboard)	10
US Top Rap Albums (Billboard)	7
