= Street Hop =

Studio album by Royce da 5'9"
- Released: October 20, 2009
- Recorded: 2006–09
- Genre: Hip-hop
- Length: 1:10:10
- Label: M.I.C.; One
- Producer: Carlos Broady; Denaun Porter; DJ Premier (also exec.); Emile; Frequency; Nottz; Quincey Tones; Raf Moses; Streetrunner

Royce da 5'9" chronology
Independent's Day (2005)	Street Hop (2009)	Hell: The Sequel (2011)

Singles from Street Hop
- 1. "Shake This" Released: March 17, 2009; 2. "Part of Me" Released: March 17, 2009; 3. "New Money" Released: September 29, 2009

Professional ratings
Review scores
Source	Rating
Allmusic	4/5 stars
Metro Times	(favorable)
RapReviews	(8/10)
Sputnikmusic	3/5 stars

Street Hop is the fourth studio album by American rapper Royce da 5'9", released in the United States on October 20, 2009, on One Records. It is the follow-up to his previous album Independent's Day (2005). At the release of Success Is Certain (August 9, 2011), Street Hop sold approximately 24,000 units in the United States via HitsDailyDouble. Despite being formally released in 2009, the singles "Shake This" and "Part of Me" were leaked online in late 2008.

== Background ==
Set for July 2009, the record was released as a joint venture between Royce's M.I.C. Records and the independent label One Records. Originally intended for the first quarter, he was in the studio with his frequent collaborators DJ Premier, Nottz, DJ Green Lantern, Quincey Tones and Carlos Broady of Diddy's The Hitmen, as well as producers Ski Beatz, Kay Gee and Emile.

=== Announcement ===
Street Hop was originally announced in 2006, and early rumors had fans speculating that Premier would produce the entire album. In September 2006, it was announced that DJ Premier would executive produce and contribute roughly half of the album's material, in addition to helping to select beats. In the same month, Royce was convicted of drunk driving, resulting in a parole violation and a prison sentence. After a year in prison, he prepared the release of the first The Bar Exam mixtape amid rumors that Nas was amenable to signing him to the rapper's Def Jam imprint, The Jones Experience.

=== Recording ===
Two albums were initially planned, the other being The Revival which was also to be overseen by Premier. While both albums would apparently have production from Havoc, Bink!, Hi-Tek, The Alchemist, 9th Wonder and others, The Revival was supposed to be released on Babygrande Records. After announcing The Bar Exam 2, a collection of songs entitled The Revival was leaked onto the Internet. Royce explained that it consisted of outdated rough cuts for The Revival and that he was focused more on his mixtape than the supposed album. After the release of The Bar Exam 2, a retail version entitled The Bar Exam 2: The Album was sold in stores, which did have the collaboration with 9th Wonder titled On The Low and was originally leaked on The Revival bootleg.

After joining the New Jersey rapper Joe Budden, New Yorker Joell Ortiz and Californian Crooked I to form the four-man group Slaughterhouse, Royce had been busy recording and touring. He later returned to the studio for his own album with a new release date. Guests on the album include Bun B, Busta Rhymes, and the rest of Slaughterhouse. Videos were shot and released for the first two singles, "Shake This" (produced by DJ Premier) and "Part of Me" (produced by Carlos Broady), both directed by Rik Cordero. Before the album's release, the rapper released The Revival EP, a four-song collection including an appearance by the rest of Slaughterhouse.

== Track listing ==
No.	Title	Producer(s)	Length
1.	"Gun Harmonizing" (featuring Crooked I)	Emile	4:15
2.	"Count for Nothing"	Nottz	3:31
3.	"Soldier" (featuring Kid Vishis and Iyana Dean)	Frequency	3:43
4.	"Something 2 Ride 2" (featuring Phonte)	DJ Premier	3:49
5.	"Dinner Time" (featuring Busta Rhymes)	Quincey Tones	3:08
6.	"Far Away"	Emile	2:54
7.	"The Warriors" (featuring Slaughterhouse and Melanie Rutherford)	Streetrunner	5:05
8.	"...A Brief Intermission (skit)"	David Cross	0:37
9.	"New Money"	Streetrunner	3:05
10.	"Shake This"	DJ Premier	4:21
11.	"Gangsta" (featuring Trick-Trick)	Raf Moses	3:55
12.	"Mine in Thiz" (featuring Mr. Porter)	Mr. Porter	3:15
13.	"Street Hop 2010"	Nottz	2:47
14.	"Thing for Your Girlfriend" (featuring K-Young)	Mr. Porter	4:26
15.	"On the Run"	Emile	4:25
16.	"Murder"	Frequency	4:38
17.	"Bad Boy" (featuring Jungle Rock Jr.)	Streetrunner	4:05
18.	"Part of Me"	Carlos Broady	4:21
19.	"Hood Love" (featuring Bun B and Joell Ortiz)	DJ Premier	3:50

Deluxe edition (bonus tracks)
No.	Title	Producer(s)	Length
20.	"I'm Fresh" (featuring Mr. Porter)	Mr. Porter	2:44
21.	"It's All About" (featuring Grafh)	Ski Beatz	2:52
22.	"My Own Planet" (featuring Big Sean)	Mr. Porter	4:02

== Chart history ==
Chart (2009)	Peak position
US Billboard 200	110
US Independent Albums (Billboard)	13
US Heatseekers Albums (Billboard)	2
US Top R&B/Hip-Hop Albums (Billboard)	29
