= Good Game: The Transition =

Studio album by Saafir
- Released: October 31, 2006
- Studio: FM Recorders (Oakland, CA)
- Genre: Hip hop
- Length: 55:21
- Label: ABB Records
- Producer: DJ Impossible; Demo; Josef Leimberg; Quazedelic

Saafir chronology
The Hit List (1999)	Good Game: The Transition (2006)

Professional ratings
Review scores
Source	Rating
RapReviews	8/10

Good Game: The Transition is the fourth solo studio album by American rapper Saafir. It was released on October 31, 2006 through ABB Records. Recording sessions took place at FM Recorders in Oakland, California. Production was handled by Josef Leimberg, DJ Impossible, Demo and Quazedelic, with Beni B and Saafir serving as executive producers. It features guest appearances from Lady, Amir Sulaiman, Michael Marshall, Mykytyn and Third Raill Vic. This album delves into deeper subject matter, but Saafir also maintains his usual style for which he is known.

== Track listing ==
No.	Title	Producer(s)	Length
1.	"Crispy"	Josef Leimberg	3:45
2.	"Cash Me Out"	Josef Leimberg	3:43
3.	"One of the Hardest"	Josef Leimberg	4:01
4.	"In My Own Words"	DJ Impossible	4:02
5.	"Take Ya Time" (featuring Lady)	Josef Leimberg	4:15
6.	"Interview #1"		0:25
7.	"Get Busy"	Josef Leimberg	3:56
8.	"Interview #2"		0:43
9.	"Devotion" (featuring Mike Marshall)	Demo	4:20
10.	"Brand New" (featuring Mykytyn)		4:07
11.	"Interview #3"		0:28
12.	"The Technology" (featuring Niggarachi)	Quazedelic	3:52
13.	"Daddy's L.G." (featuring Lady)	Josef Leimberg	4:42
14.	"Hey Baby"	Josef Leimberg	3:46
15.	"I Hafto"	Josef Leimberg	3:54
16.	"Interview #4"		0:40
17.	"Jihad"	Josef Leimberg	4:42
Total length:			55:21
