= Life Story (album) =

2000 album by Black Rob

Studio album by Black Rob
- Released: March 7, 2000
- Studios: Daddy's House (New York City, New York); Soundtrack (New York City, New York)
- Genres: Hip hop, East Coast hip hop
- Length: 69:13
- Labels: Arista; Bad Boy
- Producers: Sean "Puffy" Combs (also exec.); the Hitmen; Robert Ross; Deric "D-Dot" Angelettie (also exec.); Harve "Joe Hooker" Pierre (also exec.); Ron "Amen-Ra" Lawrence; J. Garfield; Buckwild; Robert Ross; P. Pablo; Nashiem Myrick; Carlos "6 July" Broady; Mario "Yellow Man" Winans; Yogi "Sugar Bear" Graham; Charlemagne; Shak Bak (also exec.); Richard "Younglord" Frierson

Black Rob chronology
| Life Story (2000) | The Black Rob Report (2005) |

Singles from Life Story
- 1. "Whoa!" Released: February 15, 2000; 2. "Espacio" Released: 2000

Life Story is the debut studio album by American rapper Black Rob. It was released on March 7, 2000, via Arista Records and Sean "Puffy" Combs' Bad Boy Entertainment. The album was praised by critics for its production and Rob's vocal presence and lyricism being similar to the late Notorious B.I.G. The album spawned two singles: "Whoa!" and "Espacio".

== Commercial performance ==
Life Story debuted and peaked at number 3 on the Billboard 200 and sold close to 178,000 copies in its first week released. The album has been certified platinum by the RIAA for selling over 1,000,000 copies in America. To date, it is Black Rob's best selling album.

== Critical reception ==
Professional ratings
Review scores
| Source | Rating |
|---|---|
| AllMusic | 2.5/5 stars |
| Rolling Stone | 3.5/5 stars |
| The Source | 4.5/5 stars |
| USA Today | 3.5/4 stars |

Life Story garnered positive reviews from music critics for its production and Rob's musicianship. Roxanne Blanford of AllMusic commended Rob's vocal delivery for being reminiscent of the "smooth, reserved style" of the Notorious B.I.G. and being able to "construct[s] explicit tales with hooks you can feel and lyrics that stick" concluding that, "[W]ith 20 thoroughly bruising cuts, Black Rob's debut may just succeed in helping Puff Daddy regain the street credibility lost when Combs achieved mainstream/crossover status." Kathryn Farr from Rolling Stone gave praise to Rob's skills as a rapper coming across "like a cocky veteran, spitting grim confessions ("Life Story") and baller mantras ("PD World Tour") without breaking a sweat" and Bad Boy's crew of producers supplying the record with "hook-heavy cuts" despite Puff's "threadbare formulas" from previous efforts threatening to pull it down, concluding that "P. Diddy's meddling aside, though, most of Life Story is, well, like whoa!" Vibe contributor Miguel Burke also praised Rob for being "incredibly adept at constructing graphic, autobiographical episodes and intricate tales" and pointed out Puff's "irritating ad-libs ("Make It Hot")" and "wannabe-rough rhymes ("Down the Line")" as negative qualities, concluding with, "But that doesn't change the fact that although the album gets down and dirty, Life Story is a breath of fresh air."

== Track listing ==
| No. | Title | Writer(s) | Producer | Length |
|---|---|---|---|---|
| 1. | "Mrs Barry (Intro)" | R. Ross; H. Pierre | Black Rob; Harve "Joe Hooker" Pierre for the Hitmen; Petey Pablo | 1:00 |
| 2. | "Life Story" (featuring Cheryl Pepsii Riley & Racquel) | R. Ross; C. Clay; W. Garfield; N. Myrick; P. Neeley-Rolle; H. Pierre; J. Garfield | Nashiem Myrick & Jay "Waxx" Garfield for the Hitmen | 4:58 |
| 3. | "Whoa!" | R. Ross; A. Best; H. Pierre | Buckwild | 4:04 |
| 4. | "Drive By (Interlude)" | R. Ross; R. Lawrence | Ron "Amen-Ra" Lawrence for the Hitmen | 0:47 |
| 5. | "Lookin' At Us" (featuring Cee-Lo) | R. Ross; D. Angelettie; D. Axlerod; T. Burton; N. Myrick | Nashiem Myrick for the Hitmen | 4:35 |
| 6. | "Down the Line Joint" (featuring Puff Daddy, Mark Curry, Ma$e & G-Dep) | R. Ross; M. Betha; T. Coleman; S. Combs; M. Curry; J. Graham | Yogi for the Hitmen | 4:57 |
| 7. | "Espacio" (featuring Lil' Kim & G-Dep) | R. Ross; M. Winans; S. Combs; K. Jones | Mario "Yellowman" Winans for the Hitmen | 4:05 |
| 8. | "You Don't Know Me" (featuring Joe Hooker) | R. Ross; D. Abrahams; S. Combs; H. Pierre | Harve "Joe Hooker" Pierre for the Hitmen | 4:50 |
| 9. | "Can I Live" (featuring The LOX) | R. Ross; S. Jacobs; A. Marks; L. McDaniels; J. Phillips; D. Styles; D. Angelettie | Deric "D-Dot" Angelettie for the Hitmen | 4:59 |
| 10. | "Championship (Interlude)" | R. Ross; H. Pierre | Harve "Joe Hooker" Pierre for the Hitmen; Black Rob | 1:20 |
| 11. | "PD World Tour" (featuring Puff Daddy) | R. Ross; D. Angelettie; S. Combs; H. Charlemagne | Deric "D-Dot" Angelettie for the Hitmen | 4:46 |
| 12. | "Muscle Game" (featuring Mark Curry & Mario Winans) | R. Ross; M. Winans; M. Curry | Mario "Yellowman" Winans for the Hitmen | 4:35 |
| 13. | "Cop Skit (Interlude)" | R. Ross; H. Pierre | Harve "Joe Hooker" Pierre for the Hitmen; Black Rob | 1:40 |
| 14. | "B.R" (featuring G-Dep) | R. Ross; D. Angelettie; S. Clarke | Deric "D-Dot" Angelettie for the Hitmen; Black Rob | 3:54 |
| 15. | "Thug Story" | R. Ross; R. Walters; S. Combs; H. Pierre | Sean "Puffy" Combs; Harve "Joe Hooker" Pierre for the Hitmen | 4:34 |
| 16. | "Jasmine" (featuring Carl Thomas) | R. Ross; T. Mahal; N. Myrick; D. Angelettie; C. Broady; C. Thomas | Deric "D-Dot" Angelettie; Carlos "Six July" Broady; Nashiem Myrick for the Hitmen | 5:31 |
| 17. | "Mad Rapper (Interlude)" | D. Angelettie; R. Ross | Deric "D-Dot" Angelettie for the Hitmen | 0:53 |
| 18. | "I Love You Baby" (featuring Puff Daddy) | R. Ross; R. Lawrence; J. Garfield; L. Baxter; S. Combs | Ron "Amen-Ra" Lawrence & Jay "Waxx" Garfield for the Hitmen | 3:36 |
| 19. | "Spanish Fly" (featuring Jennifer Lopez) | R. Ross; M. Ciccone; P. Leonard; D.L. Roth; S. Watanabe; B. Gaitsch; J. Graham | Yogi for the Hitmen | 4:03 |
| 20. | "Rise Up (Interlude)" | R. Ross | Shak Bak | 0:22 |
| 21. | "I Dare You" (featuring Joe Hooker) | R. Ross; P. Politi; R. Frierson; B. White; H. Pierre | Richard "Younglord" Frierson | 4:24 |

Note

- "I Love You Baby" originally appeared on the 1997 album No Way Out by Puff Daddy and the Family.

Samples

- "Whoa" contains a sample that comes from the instrumental version of François Valéry's song Joy.
- "Drive By (Interlude)" contains a sample of "The Days of Pearly Spencer" performed by Raymond Lefèvre
- "Lookin' At Us" contains a sample of Terri's Tune" performed by David Axelrod
- "Can I Live" contains a sample of "Within the Sound" by Rasa
- "B.R." contains a sample from "Yesterdays" by Paul Chambers Quintet
- "Thug Story" contains sample from "Children's Story" by Slick Rick
- "I Love You Baby" contains a sample of "Xtaby (Lure of the Unknown Love)" performed by Yma Sumac
- "Spanish Fly" contains a sample of "La Isla Bonita" by Madonna
- "I Dare You" contains a sample of "Under the Influence of Love" performed by Love Unlimited

== Personnel ==
- Executive producer: Sean "Puffy Combs", Harve Pierre and Deric "D-Dot" Angelettie
- Project manager: Kim Lumpkin
- Product/creative manager: Marcus Logan
- A&R: Harve Pierre
- Engineering: Kamel Abdo, Eric Butler, Roger Che, Stephen Dent, Tony Maserati, Michael Patterson, Joe "Smilin' Joe" Perrera, Ed Raso, Tony Smalios, Doug Wilson
- Assistant engineering: Lynn Montrose
- Mixing: Prince Charles Alexander, Roger Che, Michael Patterson, Rob Paustian, Joe "Smilin' Joe" Perrera, Ed Raso
- Programming: Stephen Dent, Harve Pierre, Mario Winans
- Mastering: Herb Powers
- Photography: Jonathan Mannion
- Cover photo: Jonathan Mannion
- Sample clearance: Deborah Mannis-Gardner

== Charts and certifications ==
=== Weekly charts ===
| Chart (2000) | Peak position |
|---|---|
| US Billboard 200 | 3 |
| US Top R&B/Hip-Hop Albums (Billboard) | 1 |

=== Year-end charts ===
| Chart (2000) | Position |
|---|---|
| US Billboard 200 | 110 |
| US Top R&B/Hip-Hop Albums (Billboard) | 26 |

=== Certifications ===
| Region | Certification | Certified units/sales |
|---|---|---|
| United States (RIAA) | Platinum | 1,000,000^{^} |
^{^} Shipments figures based on certification alone.

== See also ==
- List of Billboard number-one R&B albums of 2000
