= Whoa! (Black Rob song) =

Single by Black Rob

from the album Life Story
- Released: February 15, 2000
- Recorded: 1999
- Genre: Hip-hop
- Length: 4:07
- Label: Bad Boy; Arista
- Songwriter: Robert Ross
- Producer: Buckwild

Black Rob singles chronology
| "Got Ya Back" (1998) | "Whoa!" (2000) | "Bad Boy for Life" (2001) |

Music video
- "Whoa!" on YouTube

"Whoa!" is the lead single released from Black Rob's debut album, Life Story. The song was produced by Diggin' in the Crates Crew member Buckwild. Released in early 2000, "Whoa!" became Black Rob's highest chart appearance.

It peaked at number 43 on the Billboard Hot 100, and reached the top 10 on both the R&B and rap charts. It is Rob's only solo single to have charted during his lifetime.

In addition to Life Story, "Whoa!" has also appeared on the compilations The Source Hip Hop Music Awards 2000, Bad Boy's 10th Anniversary... The Hits, and Bad Boy 20th Anniversary Box Set Edition.

== Music video ==
The video for “Whoa!” was directed by Jeff Richter. It features Rob along with Diddy and a mob of people near a New York street. It then shows Rob entering a strip club complete with TV screens and strippers dancing as he's partying with the people around him. Midway through, Black Rob gets a call from Diddy telling him that he's bringing in the truck, with Black Rob and the other strippers replying to pull up near the fire escape.

Diddy is driving he turns up the radio volume to listen to the aforementioned song, unaware that he's driving up to a one-way street. He panics as he tries to turn the truck away from incoming cars, spinning it around as it almost hits a man carrying groceries (with both him and Diddy saying the aforementioned title in response to what happened).

The truck ends up under the fire escape where Black Rob is waiting as he jumps onto the flatbed with fireworks exploding from it. The truck continues to drive along the streets with both Black Rob and Diddy on the flatbed. Intercut are scenes of Rob near a brick background and driving other vehicles at high speed along with his friends. Harve Pierre, Shyne, and G. Dep make cameo appearances.

== Sample ==
The song's sample comes from the instrumental version of François Valéry's song Joy.

== Remix ==
The "Whoa" remix, which is 8:17 long, features (in the order): Rah Digga, Lil' Cease, G-Dep, Da Brat, Beanie Sigel and Black Rob with the intermission from Diddy, Sin (of Da Hoodfellaz), Petey Pablo and Madd Rapper.

== Formats and track listing ==
- US 12-inch Vinyl
  - A1. "Whoa!" (Radio Mix) – 4:07
  - A2. "Whoa!" (Club Mix) – 4:10
  - B1. "Whoa!" (Instrumental) – 4:07
  - B2. "Whoa!" (Acappella) – 4:10
  US CD maxi-single
  - 1. "Whoa!" (Radio Mix) – 4:07
  - 2. "Whoa!" (Instrumental) – 4:10
  - 3. "Call Out Research Hook" – 0:10
  Europe CD
  - 1. "Whoa!" (Radio Edit) – 3:05
  - 2. "Whoa!" (Album Version) – 4:05
  - 3. "I Love You Baby" – 3:39

== Chart performance ==
=== Weekly charts ===
| Chart (2000) | Peak position |
|---|---|
| UK Singles (OCC) | 44 |
| UK Hip Hop/R&B (OCC) | 8 |
| US Billboard Hot 100 | 43 |
| US Hot R&B/Hip-Hop Songs (Billboard) | 9 |
| US Hot Rap Songs (Billboard) | 8 |
| US Rhythmic (Billboard) | 24 |

=== Year-end charts ===
| End of year chart (2000) | Position |
|---|---|
| UK Urban (Music Week) | 24 |
| US Hot R&B/Hip-Hop Singles & Tracks (Billboard) | 45 |
| US Hot Rap Singles (Billboard) | 29 |
