= Saafir =

American rapper (1970–2024)

- Also known as: Mr. No No; The Shaft Sizzle; The Saucee Nomad
- Born: Reggie Gibson; August 23, 1970; Oakland, California, U.S.
- Died: November 19, 2024 (aged 54) Oakland, California
- Genre: Hip hop
- Occupations: Rapper; record producer; actor; lyricist
- Labels: Qwest; Reprise; Warner Bros.; Priority; EMI; ABB
- Formerly of: Digital Underground; Hobo Junction; The Golden State Project

Reggie Gibson (August 23, 1970 – November 19, 2024), better known as Saafir, was an American rapper, producer, and actor. He was also a member of the rap group Golden State Project (formerly known as Golden State Warriors) with Ras Kass and Xzibit.

== Life and career ==
Born in Oakland, California, he lived with Tupac Shakur and became a dancer for Digital Underground.

In November 1994, Saafir took part in one of the most notorious Bay Area rap battles, when he and members of the Hobo Junction went against Casual and members of the Hieroglyphics Crew. The battle was broadcast live by organizers Sway & King Tech on KMEL's The Wake Up Show. Coverage of the battle in March 1995's issue of The Source brought national exposure to the Bay Area hip-hop scene.

Saafir made his recording debut on several cuts on Digital Underground's The Body-Hat Syndrome in 1993, followed by an appearance on Casual's Fear Itself in early 1994. He appeared in the film Menace II Society as Harold Lawson and was featured on the film's soundtrack. With a deal from Qwest Records, Saafir recruited the Hobo Junction production team (J Groove, J.Z., Rational, Big Nose, and Poke Martian) for his freestyle debut, Boxcar Sessions (1994). He recorded an album titled Trigonometry under the alias Mr. No No before returning as Saafir in The Hit List (1999). The Hit List was considered Saafir's attempt at commercial acceptance. The album featured production by Stevie J (made famous for his work with P. Diddy's Hitmen production team) and guest vocals from West Coast heavyweights Kam and Jayo Felony and controversial East Coast lyricist Chino XL. In 2006, he released his fourth album, Good Game: The Transition (ABB Records, 2006). The album covers the major transitions throughout his life, most notably his spinal tumor, and his conversion to Islam.

Starting in 2012 Saafir's son, Saafir Gibson began to release music under the moniker Saafir.

== Injury from TWA Flight 843 ==
On July 30, 1992, Saafir was one of the passengers flying on TWA Flight 843; he suffered a back injury as a consequence of evacuating an aborted takeoff and consequent hard landing, crash and fire.

In February 2013, on Davey D's Hip-Hop Corner, Digital Underground leader Shock G revealed that Saafir had begun using a wheelchair due to complications from his spinal surgery. Saafir later appeared on Sway & King Tech's The Wake Up Show to confirm his condition and clear up some of the misconceptions stemming from Shock G's announcement.

== Death ==
Saafir had been struggling with various health issues for quite a substantial amount of time leading up to his death. On November 19, 2024, it was announced that Saafir had died, "at 8:45 a.m., surrounded by friends and family." The cause of death was revealed to be sepsis and enterocolitis. Infected sacral decubitis was also reportedly a factor in his death. He was 54.

== Discography ==
- 1994: Boxcar Sessions
- 1998: Trigonometry
- 1999: The Hit List
- 2006: Good Game: The Transition
- 2009: Fast Lane (EP)
