= Homespun Records =

Indie record label

- Parent company: Homespun Entertainment
- Founded: 1967
- Founder: Patrick Cassidy
- Distributor: Tunecore
- Genre: Soft rock, pop, jazz, Christian
- Country of origin: U.S.
- Location: Las Vegas, Nevada

Homespun Records is an American independent record label, the original record company of Rick Cassidy. It was started in 1967 by Patrick Cassidy. The first album was The Commonwealth's "The Best In Caucasian Soul" Live. In 1975 Rick Cassidy released his contemporary Christian album titled "Agape". In 1985 Rick Cassidy released his second album. A compilation of songs written over many years called "Songs I Wrote". Mary Chapman was discovered in Columbus, Ohio in 1995 and released her "Tears In The Night" debut album. In 2010 Rick Cassidy released his first jazz single "I Wanna Be Around" and his album "Neon Nights". In 2010 Homespun Records signed Jimmy and the Soulblazers to rerelease their 1973 album "Clockwork". Some of the unreleased albums include music by The Commonwealth, Tim Cassidy, The Count IV, and Melady.

== History ==
Homespun Records was started in 1967 in Alliance, Ohio by Patrick Cassidy as a record company for his band, friends and family. It later moved Syracuse, New York, and then Columbus, Ohio.

In 1995 Homespun Records reorganized in Las Vegas and began recording and remixing previous material for subsequent release. It now operates as a "web only" label offering sales and distribution on the Internet through Amazon.com, iTunes, and Internet radio stations.

== "Little Known Music" ==
Homespun also operates its own "Little Known Music" Internet radio station to promote its own music.

== Discography ==
=== Albums ===
- "Agape" Rick Cassidy, CD, Homespun Records 1975
- "Songs I Wrote" Rick Cassidy, CD, Homespun Records 1985
- "Tears In The Night" Mary Chapman, CD, Homespun Records 1995
- "Neon Nights" Rick Cassidy, CD, Homespun Records 2010
- "Clockwork" Jimmy And The Soul Blazers, CD Homespun Records 2010
- "Roller Bros Band" Roller Brothers, CD Homespun Records 2011
- "Jimmy And The Soul Blazers 50th Anniversary" Jimmy And The Soul Blazers, DVD Homespun Records 2017

=== Singles ===
- "I Wanna Be Around" Rick Cassidy, Homespun Records 2010

=== Unreleased ===
- "Live At Hancock Field" The Count IV
- "Collections" Melady
- "From Broadway To Broadway" Tim Cassidy
- "Best In Caucasian Soul" The Commonwealth
