= Game Recordings =

New York–based record label

Game Recordings was a New York–based record label best known for its artists featured on the soundtrack of the video game Grand Theft Auto III. Game Recordings artists included Royce da 5'9", Agallah, Sean Price, Pretty Ugly, Ilacoin, Nature, and JoJo Pellegrino. The label was also known for the "Game Girls," or "Hip Hop Honeys," who featured on all of the promotional singles and maxi-CDs it released.

The label's Chief Executive Officer was Jonathan "Shecky Green" Shecter, co-founder of The Source magazine. Eric "Ric Riggler" Rhea, an A&R executive, headed the company.

== History and Releases ==
Game Recordings' first release was Lord Digga's My Flows is Tight, a song based on a sample from the theme of the game show The Price is Right.

In 1999, Game Recordings released a 12" single consisting of three songs, by rap duo Bad Meets Evil, called Nuttin' to Do.

In 2000, Game Recordings released two singles from artist Ilacoin. "By A Stranger" featuring other New York artists Labba (later of Busta Rhymes' Flipmode Squad) & Bad Boy artist, Black Rob (snipped for the video game Grand Theft Auto III) and "Keep It Street" featuring Sadat X of Brand Nubian. One of the B-sides to Ilacoin's single "Keep It Street", "This, That & The 3rd" (produced by Easy Mo Bee) would be interpolated for The Wu-Tang Clan 2007 single, "Take It Back" from the 8 Diagrams album.

In 2002, the label released Game Tight, a compilation album. 50 Cent was featured on the album, on the Pretty Ugly song Hit Em' Up.

Game released three full-length albums, two by Royce da 5'9" (Rock City and Rock City Version 2.0); its third release was Game Tight, a best-of album. The label was also set to release 8-Off Agallah's First album, Imagine Your Life, although the album never saw the light of day.

In 2008, Game released two CDs by Royce da 5'9": the first was a new Royce da 5'9" album titled Lost & Found, which features rare and unreleased tracks that were recorded while he recorded for the label, and the second is titled Rock City Version 3.0, which is a mix of Royce's first two albums, Rock City and Rock City Version 2.0.

Game also provided Rockstar Games with songs for the Midnight Club 2 soundtrack.

Game Recordings stopped operating as a record label in 2005. Shecky Green continued to make and promote the Hip Hop Honeys DVD series under the Game Recordings name. In 2007, Royce da 5'9" released his single "Hit 'Em"/"Ding!" through the label.

Although Game Recordings no longer functions as a record label, an artist known as Keith from Up the Block is represented by Game. Also, the Game Las Vegas site is still in operation, as are the Hip Hop Honeys.

Although he did not record it, he did various tasks for the Infinity Ward series for the Call of Duty: Ghosts saga.
