= The Vietnam Veterans =

- Origin: Chalon-sur-Saône, France
- Genres: Psychedelic rock
- Years active: 1983–1988, 2009–present
- Labels: Lolita Records; Music Maniac Records
- Members: Mark Enbatta; Lucas Trouble; James Kibut; Eric Lenoir
- Past members: Greg Jones; Martin Joyce; Angelo Jupp; Steve Palermo; D.D. Richardson
- Website: The Vet's MySpace page

The Vietnam Veterans is a French psychedelic band, hailing originally from Chalon-sur-Saône, a commune in eastern France. They released six full-length albums during the 1980s, starting in 1983. The band was praised by many alternative music publications, including Bucketfull of Brains during the 1980s. After a 21-year-long pause, they are now active again.

== History ==
After releasing their compilation album The Days of Pearly Spencer in 1988, they broke up, and some members moved on to other projects. In 2005 The Vietnam Veterans released a single called "I Give You My Life / Children Eyes", and in 2009 a full-length album called Strange Girl (As The Gitanes). The band The Gitanes was one of the projects a few of the former Vets had, and the name is now added to The Vietnam Veterans name, calling it "The Vietnam Veterans (a.k.a. The Gitanes)". Mark Enbatta died 9. 9. 2021.

== Members ==
=== Current members ===
- Mark Enbatta – lead vocals, guitar (1983–1988, 2009–✝2021)
- Lucas Trouble – keyboards (1983–1988, 2009–✝2016)
- James Kibut – (2009–present)
- Eric Lenoir – (2009–present)

== Discography ==
=== Studio albums ===
Year	Title	Label	Notes
1983	On the Right Track Now	Lolita Records	Re-released 1985 by Music Maniac Records
1984	Crawfish for the Notary	Lolita Records	Re-released by Music Maniac Records
1986	In Ancient Times	Music Maniac Records	
1987	Catfish Eyes... and Tales	Music Maniac Records	
2009	Strange Girl (As The Gitanes)	Music Maniac Records	
2014	Fistful of Love	Nova Express	

=== Live album ===
Year	Title	Label	Notes
1985	Green Peas	Music Maniac Records	Double LP

=== Compilation albums ===
Year	Title	Label	Notes
1988	The Days of Pearly Spencer	Music Maniac Records	
1989	The Music Maniac "Gimmick" Compilation	Music Maniac Records	Various artists. Song: "Wolf"

=== Single ===
Year	Title	Label	Notes
2005	"I Give You My Life / Children Eyes"		
