= List of awards and nominations received by Lil' Kim =

Lil' Kim awards and nominations
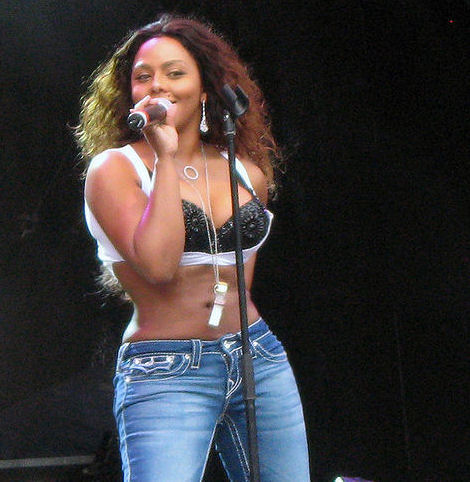
- Lil' Kim in 2008
Awards and nominations
Award	Wins	Nominations
BET Awards	1	15
Billboard Music Awards	1	5
Grammy Awards	1	6
MOBO Awards	2	2
MTV Video Music Awards	3	8
Soul Train Lady of Soul Awards	2	3
Soul Train Music Awards	0	2

Totals (Note: Certain award groups do not simply award one winner. They acknowledge several different recipients, have runners-up, and have third place. Since this is a specific recognition and is different from losing an award, runner-up mentions are considered wins in this award tally. For simplification and to avoid errors, each award in this list has been presumed to have had a prior nomination.)
- Wins: 52
- Nominations: 100

Kimberly Denise Jones, known by her stage name Lil' Kim, is an American rapper and singer-songwriter.

Her debut studio album Hard Core was released on November 12, 1996 in the United States, by the Atlantic subsidiary Big Beat Records, followed by her second album The Notorious K.I.M. on June 27, 2000. Lil' Kim's third studio album, La Bella Mafia, was released on March 4, 2003, and her latest album The Naked Truth on September 27, 2005.

Throughout Lil' Kim's career, she has received several awards and nominations. In 1998, Kim received recognition from the MTV Music Video Awards, winning an award for viewer's choice alongside The Notorious B.I.G. and Puffy. That same year, Kim received a nomination for Best Rap Performance by a Duo or Group for her single "Not Tonight" at The Grammys.

On March 27, 2001, Lil' Kim, Christina Aguilera, Pink, and Mýa recorded a cover version of the Labelle song, "Lady Marmalade" as a medley for the feature film Moulin Rouge!. The single produced Kim's first Grammy Award in 2002 for rapping on a Best Pop Collaboration with Vocals, along with several other awards and nominations from the MTV Awards which garnered 2 awards from 6 nominations.

Her single "How Many Licks?" gained her a nomination from the "Soul Train Awards" for "Best R&B/Soul or Rap Music Video". It also received a nomination from "The Source Awards" for "Music Video of The Year". Lil' Kim's third studio album, La Bella Mafia, produced Lil Kim two Grammy Award nominations in 2004, one for her single "Came Back For You" for Best Female Rap Solo Performance, and "Magic Stick" with 50 Cent for Best Rap Performance by a Duo or Group. As of 2013, Kim has been nominated for three World Music Awards.

== American Music Awards ==
The American Music Awards is an annual music awards ceremony and one of several major annual American music awards shows. Lil' Kim has received 3 nominations.

Year	Nominee / work	Award	Result
2003	Lil' Kim	Favorite Rap/Hip-Hop Female Artist	Nominated
2005	Lil' Kim	Favorite Rap/Hip-Hop Female Artist	Nominated

== ASCAP Rhythm & Soul Awards ==
Year	Nominee / work	Award	Result
1996	"Player's Anthem" (with The Notorious B.I.G.)	Award Winning Rap Songs	Won
1996	"Player's Anthem" (with The Notorious B.I.G.)	Award Winning R&B Songs	Won
1997	"Get Money" (with Junior M.A.F.I.A.)	Award Winning Rap Songs	Won
1997	"Get Money" (with Junior M.A.F.I.A.)	Award Winning R&B Songs	Won

== BET ==
The BET Awards were established in 2001 by the Black Entertainment Television network to celebrate African Americans and other minorities in music, acting, sports, and other fields of entertainment over the past year. Lil' Kim Has been nominated 7 times.

=== BET Awards ===
Year	Nominee / work	Award	Result
2001	Lil' Kim	Best Female Hip-Hop Artist	Nominated
2006	Lil' Kim	Best Female Hip-Hop Artist	Nominated
2008	"Let It Go" (with Keyshia Cole & Missy Elliott)	Best Collaboration	Nominated
2008	"Let It Go" (with Keyshia Cole & Missy Elliott)	Viewers Choice	Nominated
2010	Lil' Kim	Best Female Hip-Hop Artist	Nominated
2016	Lil' Kim	Best Female Hip-Hop Artist	Nominated
2016	Puff Daddy & The Family	Best Group	Nominated

=== BET Hip-Hop Awards ===
Year	Nominee / work	Award	Result
2019	Lil' Kim	I Am Hip-Hop	Won

== BDB Spin Awards ==
Year	Nominee / work	Award	Result
2003	"The Jump Off"	BDS Certified Spin Award (100,000 spins)	Won
2003	"The Jump Off"	BDS Certified Spin Award (50,000 spins)	Won
2003	"Magic Stick" (with 50 Cent)	BDS Certified Spin Award (200,000 spins)	Won
2003	"Can't Hold Us Down" (with Christina Aguilera)	BDS Certified Spin Award (100,000 spins)	Won
2005	"Sugar (Gimme Some)" (with Trick Daddy, Ludacris, Cee-Lo Green)	BDS Certified Spin Award (200,000 spins)	Won
2006	"Lady Marmalade" (with Christina Aguilera, Mýa, Pink, Missy Elliott)	BDS Certified Spin Award (300,000 spins)	Won

== Billboard ==
=== Billboard Music Awards ===
Year	Nominee / work	Award	Result
1995	"Player's Anthem" (with Junior M.A.F.I.A.)	Best New Artist Clip	Nominated
1997	"No Time" (with Puff Daddy)	Best New Artist Clip	Nominated
1997	Lil' Kim	Female R&B/Hip-Hop Artist of the Year	Nominated
1998	"It's All About the Benjamins" (with The Notorious B.I.G., Puff Daddy)	Best Rap Clip	Nominated
2002	"Lady Marmalade" (with Christina Aguilera, Pink & Mýa)	Best Dance Clip of the Year	Nominated
2002	"How Many Licks?" (with Sisqo)	Best Rap/Hip-Hop Clip of the Year	Nominated

== BMI ==
=== BMI Urban Awards ===
Year	Nominee / work	Award	Result
2005	"Magic Stick" (feat. 50 Cent)	Award Winning Songs	Won
2008	"Let It Go" (with Keyshia Cole & Missy Elliott)	Award Winning Songs	Won

=== BMI Pop Awards ===
Year	Nominee / work	Award	Result
2005	"Magic Stick" (with 50 Cent)	Most Performed Songs	Won

=== BMI Film & TV Awards ===
Year	Nominee / work	Award	Result
2002	"Lady Marmalade" (with Christina Aguilera, Pink & Mýa)	Most Performed Song from a Film	Won

== Channel [V] Thailand Music Video Awards ==
Year	Nominee / work	Award	Result
2002	"Lady Marmalade" (with Christina Aguilera, Pink, Mya)	Popular Group Video	Won

== Coke Juice Awards ==
Year	Nominee / work	Award	Result
2001	"Lady Marmalade" (with Christina Aguilera, Pink, Mya)	Best R&B Video	Won

== City Of West Hollywood ==
Year	Nominee / work	Award	Result
2012	Herself	Key To The City	Won

== Girls' Choice Awards ==
Year	Nominee / work	Award	Result
2019	"Can't Hold Us Down" (with Christina Aguilera)	Most Empowering Classic Girl Power Anthem	Pending

== Grammy Awards ==
A Grammy Award (originally called Gramophone Award) – or Grammy – is an accolade by the National Academy of Recording Arts and Sciences of the United States to recognize outstanding achievement in the music industry. The annual presentation ceremony features performances by prominent artists, and some of the awards of more popular interest are presented in a widely viewed televised ceremony. It is the music equivalent to the Emmy Awards for television, the Tony Awards for stage performances, and the Academy Awards for motion pictures. Kim Has received 6 nominations and won a Grammy for Best Pop Collaboration with Vocals.

Year	Nominee / work	Award	Result
1998	"Not Tonight" (with Missy Elliott, Angie Martinez, Left Eye and Da Brat)	Best Rap Performance by a Duo or Group	Nominated
2002	"Lady Marmalade" (with Christina Aguilera, Pink and Mýa)	Best Pop Collaboration with Vocals	Won
2004	"Can't Hold Us Down" (with Christina Aguilera)	Best Pop Collaboration with Vocals	Nominated
2004	"Came Back for You"	Best Female Rap Solo Performance	Nominated
2004	"Magic Stick" (with 50 Cent)	Best Rap Performance by a Duo or Group	Nominated
2008	"Let It Go" (with Keyshia Cole and Missy Elliott)	Best Rap/Sung Collaboration	Nominated

== Groovevolt Music & Fashion Awards ==
Year	Nominee / work	Award	Result
2004	"Can't Hold Us Down" (with Christina Aguilera)	Most Fashionable Music Video	Won
2004	"When Kim Say (Can You Hear Me Now)"	Best Hip-Hop Deep Cut (Unreleased Album Track)	Won
2004	"La Bella Mafia"	Best Hip-Hop Album – Female	Nominated
2004	"Magic Stick" (feat. 50 Cent)	Best Hip-Hop Collaboration	Nominated

== Inspiring Our Children to Dream Awards ==
Founded in Los Angeles in 1999, the Inspiring Our Children to Dream Awards are held each year by Children Uniting Nations and are presented during their Oscar viewing party. The annual event serves as a platform to raise funds that support Children Uniting Nation's mission to serve the at risk youth and foster children in their community. Lil' Kim was awarded the Crystal Dove Award at the 8th annual viewing party in 2007 and also serves as a Goodwill Ambassador for the cause.

Year	Nominee / work	Award	Result
2007	Lil' Kim	Crystal Dove Award	Won

== Juice TV Awards ==
Year	Nominee / work	Award	Result	Ref.
2001	"Lady Marmalade" (with Lil' Kim, Mýa and Pink)	Best R&B Video	Won	

== MOBO Awards ==
Year	Nominee / work	Award	Result
1998	Puff Daddy and the Family	Best International Act	Won
2003	Lil' Kim	Fashion Icon Award	Won

== MTV ==
=== MTV Music Video Awards Japan ===
Year	Nominee / work	Award	Result
2002	"Lady Marmalade" (with Christina Aguilera, Pink and Mýa)	Best Video from a Film	Won

=== MTV Europe Music Awards ===
The MTV Europe Music Awards ("EMAs") were established in 1994 by MTV Networks Europe to celebrate the most popular music videos in Europe. The MTV Europe Music Awards is today a popular celebration of what MTV viewers consider the best in music. The awards are chosen by MTV viewers. Lil' Kim Had been nominated for Lady Marmalade.

Year	Nominee / work	Award	Result
2001	"Lady Marmalade" (with Christina Aguilera, Pink and Mýa)	Best Song	Nominated

=== MTV Asia Awards ===
Year	Nominee / work	Award	Result
2002	"Lady Marmalade"	Favorite Video	Nominated

=== MTV Video Music Awards ===
An MTV Video Music Award is an award to honor the best in the music video medium. Lil' Kim Has won 3 awards.

Year	Nominee / work	Award	Result
1998	"All About The Benjamins" (Rock Remix) (with Puff Daddy, The LOX and The Notorious B.I.G.)	Viewers Choice	Won
1998	"All About The Benjamins" (Rock Remix) (with Puff Daddy, The LOX and The Notorious B.I.G.)	Video of the Year	Nominated
2001	"Lady Marmalade" (with Christina Aguilera, Pink and Mýa)	Video of the Year	Won
2001	"Lady Marmalade" (with Christina Aguilera, Pink and Mýa)	Best Pop Video	Nominated
2001	"Lady Marmalade" (with Christina Aguilera, Pink and Mýa)	Best Video from a Film	Won
2001	"Lady Marmalade" (with Christina Aguilera, Pink and Mýa)	Best Choreography in a Video	Nominated
2001	"Lady Marmalade" (with Christina Aguilera, Pink and Mýa)	Best Art Direction in a Video	Nominated
2001	"Lady Marmalade" (with Christina Aguilera, Pink and Mýa)	Best Dance Video	Nominated

== Music Video Production Association Awards ==
Year	Nominee / work	Award	Result
1997	"It's All About The Benjamins" (Rock Remix) (with Notorious B.I.G, Puffy)	Best Urban/R&B Video of the Year	Won
2001	"How Many Licks" (with Sisqo)	Best Hip-Hop Video Of The Year	Won
2001	"How Many Licks" (with Sisqo)	Best Hair In A Music Video	Won
2002	"Lady Marmalade" (with Christina Aguilera, Pink and Mýa)	Best Styling in a Video	Won
2002	"Lady Marmalade" (with Christina Aguilera, Pink and Mýa)	Best Soundtrack Video	Nominated

== National Film & Television Awards ==
Year	Recipient	Category	Result	Ref.
2019	Girls Cruise	Best Reality Show	Nominated	
2019	Girls Cruise	Best Entertainment Show	Won	

== New York Magazine Awards ==
New York Music Awards is an annual awards ceremony and live concert, established in 1986. Lil' Kim won her first nomination from the New York Music Awards.

Year	Nominee / work	Award	Result
1999	Lil' Kim	Artist of the Year	Won

== Online Film & Television Association ==
Year	Nominee / work	Award	Result
2001	Lady Marmalade	Best Music, Adapted Song	Nominated

== Peoples Choice Awards ==
Year	Nominee / work	Award	Result
2004	Carwash	Favorite Remake	Nominated
2004	Carwash	Favorite Combined Forces	Nominated

== Power of Influence Awards ==
Year	Nominee / work	Award	Result
2018	Herself	Honouree	Won

== Radio Music Awards ==
Year	Nominee / work	Award	Result
2001	"Lady Marmalade" (with Christina Aguilera, Pink and Mýa)	Top 40 Pop Radio Song of the Year	Won
2003	"Magic Stick" (feat. 50 Cent)	Song of the Year/Hip Hop Radio	Nominated

== Sister 2 Sister Intergenerational Celebration ==
Starting in 1999, Sister 2 Sister Magazine's Annual Intergenerational Celebration pairs hip-hop and R&B singers with various politicians and business professionals from across the country and honors those that contribute to African-American culture. Kim was paired with Debra L. Lee and was awarded the "You're My Sis" award in 2002.

Year	Nominee / work	Award	Result
2002	Lil' Kim	"You're My Sis" Award	Won

== Soul Train ==
Soul Train Music Awards is an annual award show aired in national broadcast syndication that honors the best in African American music and entertainment established in 1987. Lil' Kim has won 2 awards by Soul Train.

=== Lady of Soul Awards ===
Year	Nominee / work	Award	Result
1997	"Crush on You" (with Lil' Cease)	Best R&B/Soul or Rap Music Video	Won
1998	"Not Tonight" (with Missy Elliott, Angie Martinez, Lisa "Left Eye" Lopes & Da Brat)	Best R&B/Soul or Rap Music Video	Won
2001	"How Many Licks?" (feat. Sisqó)	Best R&B/Soul or Rap Music Video	Nominated

=== Soul Train Awards ===
Year	Nominee / work	Award	Result
1996	Junior M.A.F.I.A.	Best R&B/Soul or Rap New Artist	Nominated
1998	Hard Core	Best R&B/Soul Album – Female	Nominated

== Teen Choice Awards ==
Year	Nominee / work	Award	Result
2001	"Lady Marmalade" (with Christina Aguilera, Pink, Mýa, Missy Elliott)	Choice Song of the Summer	Won

== The Source Awards ==
The first live Source Hip-Hop Music Awards show was held in 1994. Lil' Kim has received 8 nominations at the Source Awards.

Year	Nominee / work	Award	Result
2000	"Quiet Storm (Remix)" (with Mobb Deep)	Single of the Year	Nominated
2001	"How Many Licks?" ( with sisqo)	Music Video of the Year	Nominated
2003	Lil' Kim	Female Artist of the Year	Won
2003	"The Jump Off" ( with Mr. Cheeks)	Female Single of the Year	Won
2003	"Magic Stick" ( with 50 Cent)	Fat Tape Song of the Year	Nominated
2003	La Bella Mafia	Album of the Year	Nominated
2003	Lil' Kim	Trendsetter of the Year	Nominated
2004	"Naughty Girl" (with Beyoncé)	Best Female Rap Collaboration	Nominated

== The Source ==
Year	Nominee / work	Award	Result
2005	The Naked Truth	5 Mics	Won

== The Music Factory Awards ==
Year	Nominee / work	Award	Result
2001	"Lady Marmalade" ( with Christina Aguilera, Pink, Mýa)	Beste Clip	Won

== Urban Music Awards ==
Year	Nominee / work	Award	Result
2004	"The Jump Off"	Best Night Club Song	Won

== VIBE Awards ==
Beginning in 2003, Vibe produced and aired its annual awards show on UPN through 2006, and VH1 Soul in 2007.

Year	Nominee / work	Award	Result
2003	"Magic Stick" (with 50 Cent)	Coolest Collabo	Nominated
2005	"The Naked Truth"	Album of the Year	Nominated

=== VH1 Awards ===
Year	Nominee / work	Award	Result
2001	"Lady Marmalade" (with Christina Aguilera, Pink & Mýa)	My VH1 Favorite Video	Won
2001	"Lady Marmalade" (with Christina Aguilera, Pink & Mýa)	My VH1 Music Award for Is It Hot in Here Or Is It Just My Video?	Won
2001	"Lady Marmalade" (with Christina Aguilera, Pink & Mýa)	There's No "I" in Team	Nominated
2001	"What's Going On"	There's No "I" in Team	Won
2002	Lil' Kim	Shakespeare in Da Hiz-Zouse	Nominated

=== VH1 Hip-Hop Honors ===
Year	Nominee / work	Award	Result
2016	Lil' Kim	Honoree	Won

== WEEN Awards ==
Year	Nominee / work	Award	Result
2016	Lil' Kim	Icon Award	Won

== World Music Awards ==
Year	Nominee / work	Award	Result
2013	Lil' Kim	Worlds Best Female Artist	Nominated
2013	Lil' Kim	Worlds Best Live Act	Nominated
2013	Lil' Kim	Worlds Best Entertainer of The Year	Nominated

== Other accolades ==
=== Listicles ===
Publisher	Listicle	Year(s)	Result	Ref.
50/50innertainment	Top 50 Greatest Female Rappers of all time	2022	2nd	
