= Return of the Queen Tour =

2012 concert tour by Lil' Kim

- Tour by Lil' Kim
- Tour poster that was featured at Emo's
- Associated album: Black Friday
- Start date: May 17, 2012
- End date: September 21, 2012
- Legs: 1
- No. of shows: 22
- Box office: 6.4M

Lil' Kim concert chronology
- 2010 Tour (2010); Return of the Queen Tour (2012)

Return of the Queen Tour is a headlining tour by American rapper Lil' Kim. The tour, her first since 2010, was launched in support of her promotional singles and to mark her return to the music scene. The tour was first announced in April, 2012. In May, 2012, it was announced that Kim would return to South Africa for 3 dates starting in September. It would mark her second time performing there following her 2011 performance at ZARfest. However, in July, 2012, the company responsible for organising the shows, Hunnypot Entertainment, announced that the dates had been cancelled.

In total the tour had 22 shows around North America and grossed over $290k per show.

== Background ==
After the release of her first promotional single, "If You Love Me" in February, 2012, Kim returned to the spotlight with a performance on Rip the Runway, as well as appearances on MTV's RapFix and Sucka Free. On April 22, the first 11 dates of the tour were announced, with the remaining dates added the following month. She announced the tour via Twitter, saying "#TeamLilKim I can't stay on long. Got 2 get back 2 the Studio. Love U guys & can't wait to see U on the Tour !!!!"

The tour bus Kim used was designed, printed & installed in less than 30 hours.

== Opening Acts & Special Guests ==
- Drita D’Avanzo from Mob Wives (Hosting Bronx show)
- Eve, Kelly Rowland, Juelz Santana, Missy Elliott, Mr. Cheeks, Pepa, Cassidy, Fred the Godson, Papoose, Saigon, Babs Bunny, Somaya Reece, Will Traxx, (Some performed with Kim, while some were there to support, Bronx show only)
- Tiff Gabana (Albany show only)
- Lynguistic Civilians (Vermont show only)
- Shawnna (Illinois show only)
- DJ Todd & Nick Fury (Columbus show only)
- Naima Adedapo (Milwaukee show only)
- DJ Green (Minneapolis show only)
- Erica P (Cincinnati show only)
- R-Shell, Fieldhouse, Shannon Marie & Prototype XX (Nebraska show only)
- Lil' Mama, Apollonia, Natalie Nunn, Somaya Reece (Factory, Hollywood show, support only)
- MicahTron, Ill Camille, Ginger & Ms. Be, hosted by Somaya Reece (San Francisco show only)
- Da Brat, City High, Natalie Nunn, Malaysia Pargo & Laura Govan from Basketball Wives: LA, Shaunie O'Neal, Toni Monroe, Guyana, The Lady of Rage, Kurupt. (Key Club, Hollywood show)

== Setlist ==
Although an official setlist for the show was never released, songs performed on the tour included

1. "Queen Bitch"
2. "Black Friday"
3. "Not Tonight (Remix)"
4. "The Jump Off" / "Mo Money Mo Problems"
5. "How Many Licks?"
6. "Get Money" / "Gettin' Money (The Get Money Remix)"
7. "It's All About the Benjamins"
8. "Quiet Storm (Remix)"
9. "Lighters Up"
10. "Let It Go"
11. "Big Momma Thang"
12. "Magic Stick"
13. "Empire State of Mind"
14. "Not Tonight"
15. "Crush On You"
16. "Lady Marmalade"
17. "Keys To The City"
18. "Whoa"

== Tour dates ==
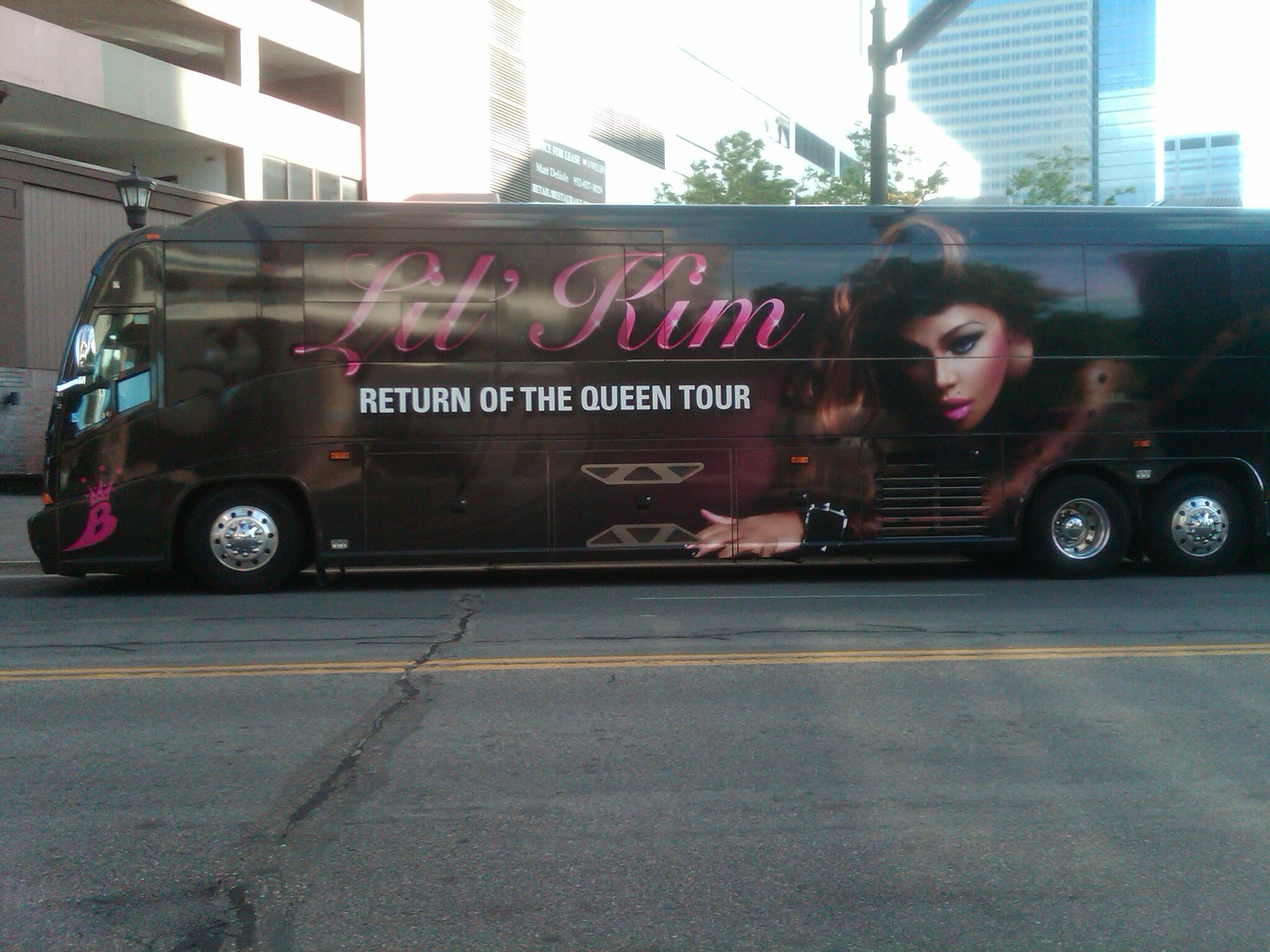
The tour bus Lil' Kim used during the tour.

Date	City	Country	Venue
May 17, 2012	New Haven	United States	Toad's Place
May 18, 2012	The Bronx	United States	Paradise Theater
May 19, 2012	Albany	United States	Northern Lights
May 22, 2012	Burlington	United States	Higher Ground (Ballroom)
May 25, 2012	Markham	United States	Club Adrianna's
May 26, 2012	Columbus	United States	Alrosa Villa
May 27, 2012	Milwaukee	United States	Riverside Theater
May 29, 2012	Minneapolis	United States	Fine Line Music Cafe
June 1, 2012	Cincinnati	United States	Bogart's
June 4, 2012	Lincoln	United States	Bourbon Theatre
June 8, 2012	Los Angeles	United States	The Factory & ULTRA SUEDE
June 9, 2012	Los Angeles	United States	LA Pride
June 11, 2012	San Francisco	United States	Mezzanine
June 13, 2012	Los Angeles	United States	Key Club
June 14, 2012	San Luis Obispo	United States	Slo Brewing Company
June 15, 2012	Phoenix	United States	Celebrity Theatre
June 17, 2012	Flagstaff	United States	Orpheum Theater
June 19, 2012	Austin	United States	Emo's East
June 20, 2012	Pensacola	United States	Vinyl Music Hall
June 21, 2012	New Orleans	United States	Harrah's Casino
June 23, 2012	Kansas City	United States	Harrah's Casino
September 21, 2012	Washington, D.C.	United States	Love

Cancellations and rescheduled shows

- May 13, Pensacola show at Vinyl Musical Hall was changed to June 20.
- May 17, Austin show at Emo's was moved to June 19.
- June 2, Detroit show at The Fillmore was canceled.
- June 8, Agoura Hills show was canceled due to fire hazards.
- June 16, Las Vegas show at Planet Hollywood was canceled.
- June 22, Hammond show at Horseshoe Hammond was canceled.
- June 24, Washington, D.C. show at Ibiza's Nightclub was canceled and changed to September 21 at Love Nightclub.
- September, 6th-8th shows in South Africa were canceled.

== Reception ==
=== Critical response ===
The tour received positive reviews.

Billboard gave positive review for the second show of the tour, stating "As one of her few hometown shows since a sparsely attended gig at Irving Plaza in June 2010, Lil' Kim proved that she can still sting" though noted "Despite several awkward pauses where she vanished backstage, the Brooklyn native carried the show, working the enraptured audience with a live band in tow." Rashaud Thomas of NBC New York praised the tour, commenting "From the minute she took the stage, the Queen Bee had her court in a trance, rapping along to every one of her hits... After last night’s performance it’s safe to say she’s on the right track."

MTV also gave a good review about the show, saying "Female MCs, take note: The Queen wants her throne back." The Source also wrote an article, saying "Putting to rest the thought that women in Hip-Hop just can't get along, Kim confirmed that she's already got a record in the bag with Eve and Missy and is still working on her documentary and book." Bene Viera from VH1 praised Kim's performance, commenting "The pint-sized beauty’s performance proved one thing–not that anything needed proving–a legend is a legend. The Queen Bee’s return has arrived, and the fans haven’t gone anywhere. Bow down to the throne." while Ernest Hardy of the Los Angeles Times added "[...] the thing that really girds Kim’s voice and persona is a genuine sweetness that humanizes a steely persona."
