= How Many Licks? =

2000 single by Lil' Kim featuring Sisqó

Single by Lil' Kim featuring Sisqó

from the album The Notorious K.I.M.
- Released: November 21, 2000
- Genre: Hip hop; funk; dirty rap
- Length: 3:52
- Label: Queen Bee; Atlantic
- Songwriters: Kimberly Jones; Mario Winans; Mark Andrews; Sean Combs
- Producers: Mario Winans; Sean Combs

Lil' Kim singles chronology
| "No Matter What They Say" (2000) | "How Many Licks?" (2000) | "Wait a Minute" (2001) |

Sisqó singles chronology
| "Incomplete" (2000) | "How Many Licks?" (2000) | "Can I Live?" (2001) |

Music video
- "How Many Licks?" on YouTube

"How Many Licks?" is a song by American rapper Lil' Kim featuring vocals by American musician Sisqó from Lil' Kim's second studio album, The Notorious K.I.M. (2000). Mario Winans and Sean Combs produced the song, and wrote it with Lil' Kim and Sisqó. The hip hop song samples the Knight Rider theme song, with lyrics expressing a woman's desire for oral sex and her sexual relationships with a variety of men. The chorus is a reference to the advertising slogan for Tootsie Pops. A remix by the Neptunes has additional vocals from American artists Kelis, Lil' Cease, and Snoop Dogg. "How Many Licks?" was released as the second and final single from The Notorious K.I.M. on November 21, 2000, by Queen Bee Entertainment and Atlantic Records.

"How Many Licks?" was praised by music critics after its release and in retrospective reviews; the Neptunes remix also received positive reviews. However, African-American studies professor Mark Anthony Neal criticized the song's treatment of black female sexuality. Commentators compared Trinidadian-American rapper Nicki Minaj's 2014 single "Anaconda" to "How Many Licks?". "How Many Licks?" peaked at number 75 on the US Billboard Hot 100 chart and charted in several other countries, but was not as commercially successful as Lil' Kim's previous singles.

The song's accompanying music video was directed by Francis Lawrence and features the rapper as a sex doll in three separate sexual fantasies. Sisqó did not appear in the video due to conflicts with his record label Def Jam Recordings. Although music critics praised the visual, its treatment of sexuality elicited varied opinions from academics. It was also compared to music videos by other artists, including Minaj's "Stupid Hoe" (2011) and American rapper Missy Elliott's "The Rain (Supa Dupa Fly)" (1997). In addition to the video, Lil' Kim promoted "How Many Licks?" with live performances.

== Recording and releases ==
Mario Winans and Sean Combs produced "How Many Licks?" and wrote it with Lil' Kim and Sisqó, who are credited under their legal names (Kimberly Jones and Mark Andrews). Sisqó wrote the song's hook and contributed verses. The vocals were recorded by Dave Wade and Stephen Dent at Daddy's House Recording Studios in New York City and Trans Continental Studios in Orlando, with Ed Raso mixing the audio.

"How Many Licks?" was released as the second single from Lil' Kim's second album, The Notorious K.I.M. (2000), as a 12-inch single and CD single by Atlantic Records and Queen Bee Entertainment. A remix by American production duo the Neptunes was also made available, with vocals by American singer Kelis and verses by American rappers Lil' Cease and Snoop Dogg. The song's original version was included on several compilations, including the 2001 albums The Source Hip Hop Music Awards 2001, Pure Dance 2001, Hip Hop Soul Party: Episode V, and 2008's 15 of the Best Urban Classics.

== Music and lyrics ==
"How Many Licks?"
Excerpt from the song, with the sample from the Knight Rider theme song. Music critics identified several different musical influences on the single, such as funk and "Daft Punk-like noises".

"How Many Licks?" is a three-minute and 52-second hip hop song that uses a sample from the theme song of the television series Knight Rider (1982–1986). Music critic Simon Reynolds described its composition as "full of Daft Punk-like noises", and an NME writer called it "pornographic funk". Michael Arceneaux of VH1 wrote that the single and other tracks from The Notorious K.I.M. have a "glossier and far more commercial" sound than the rapper's previous releases.

The lyrics of "How Many Licks?" are part of a movement in 1990s & 2000s hip hop music to express sexuality positively. Sexuality studies professor Thomas A. Foster wrote that Lil' Kim reverses a trend in hip hop music which objectifies women for the male gaze and celebrates male sexuality. In 2007, gender studies scholar Aine McGlynn described "How Many Licks?" as one of the most sexually explicit songs to receive airplay.

The lyrics describe a woman's interest in oral sex, with Preezy of The Boombox calling the song a "sexual anthem". Lyrics include: "Roll some weed with some tissue and close your eyes/ Then imagine your tongue in between my thighs." Lil' Kim raps about having sex with men of various nationalities, spanking one from "down South" and "com[ing] in his mouth". The rapper notes that people masturbate or have sex to her music: "goes out to my niggaz in jail / Beating they dicks to the double X-L." She re-imagines herself as "an image in a magazine, a poster, a character in a gangsta narrative, a luxury item and a bling accessary". Lil' Kim and Sisqó also exchange pick-up lines during the song. The chorus refers to the advertising slogan for Tootsie Pops ("How many licks does it takes to get to the Tootsie Roll centre of a Tootsie Pop?"), and ties sexuality to consumerism according to media studies professor Scott Wilson.

For the track's remix, Lil' Kim associates her rapping abilities with oral sex: "Ya neva seen this stroke of genius / [I] put tha cleanest, meanest lips on ya penis!" She is also noted to popularize the word "gangstress" which she had previously used in "Spend a Little Doe", a track from her 1996 album Hard Core, and a remix of the American trio Intro's 1995 single "Funny How Time Flies". The rapper further introduces herself as "the female Mack".

== Critical reception ==
"How Many Licks?" received primarily positive reviews from music critics following its release and during retrospective reviews. Commentators praised the single for its sexual content. Michelle Goldberg of Salon wrote that Lil' Kim maintained a focus on her "playfully ripe side" from Hard Core. Noisey's Adria Young referred to its lyrics in 2015 as "some of the rap diva's most raunchy verses to date", citing the song as an example of how Sisqó pushed the envelope of sexuality in popular culture. Brittany Vincent of Billboard noted it as an example of how the rapper was unafraid of exploring sex in her music. An editor for Apple Music included the song on its "Lil' Kim Essentials" playlist, writing that Lil Kim' "more than held her own as an agile and self-possessed MC who pushed hip-hop toward its unalloyed id". However, African-American studies professor Mark Anthony Neal criticized the single for perpetuating the sexual objectification of women. Comparing "How Many Licks?" with American singer Tweet's 2002 song "Oops (Oh My)", Neal wrote that Tweet's focus on masturbation was a better expression of black female sexuality.

The remix of "How Many Licks?" was also praised in retrospective reviews. In a 2015 article, Michael Arceneaux of VH1 called it "an under-appreciated gem" and suggested that Lil' Kim record another collaboration with Neptunes member Pharrell Williams in the future. According to Arceneaux, the remix is treated with "great reverence" by fans. Mark Anthony Neal was more critical of the remix due to Fabolous' lyrics ("Oops, there goes my kids on your face"), saying that the addition changed the song's message from "a celebration of autonomous female sexuality" to a "vulgar, demeaning moment of black female objectification".

Some critics compared Nicki Minaj's 2014 single, "Anaconda" to "How Many Licks". Alex Kristelis of Bustle noted that both songs focused on men's appreciation of the singer's body. A Khaleej Times writer called "Anaconda" a "blatant copy" of "How Many Licks?", with Minaj's song sharing "the lyrical blue print and theme" of Lil' Kim's. Westword's Cory Lamz wrote that Minaj parodied "How Many Licks?" and its associated visuals in the music video for her 2011 single "Stupid Hoe".

== Commercial performance ==
According to Michael Arceneaux, "How Many Licks?" and fellow songs from The Notorious K.I.M. did not fare well on radio. Although media outlets considered it a "hit", the song was less commercially successful than Lil' Kim's previous releases. It reached several Billboard charts in the United States, peaking at number 75 on the Billboard Hot 100 on December 2, 2000 and remaining on the chart for nine weeks. The song also reached number 11 on the Hot Rap Songs chart on December 9, 2000, similarly remaining on that chart for nine weeks. It peaked at number 36 on the Hot R&B/Hip-Hop Songs chart that day, remaining on the chart for 20 weeks.

"How Many Licks?" also charted in several other countries. It peaked at number six on the Dutch Top 40 chart, and remained on the chart for 13 weeks. The single reached number seven on the Ultratop chart in the Flanders region of Belgium, also remaining on that chart for 13 weeks. It further peaked at number 58 on the German Singles Chart, remaining for eight editions.

== Music video ==
=== Production and release ===
The song's music video, directed by Francis Lawrence, was shot in the Sylmar neighborhood of Los Angeles on October 3 and 4, 2000, and premiered the following month. Discussing the video with MTV News, Lil' Kim said: "This is where I get to get freaky". The rapper described her performance as different personas as "something the whole world has been waiting for". Brad Wete of Billboard wrote that the idea of the rapper as a sex toy was an expansion of her image as a black Barbie. The video was re-uploaded to Atlantic's YouTube channel on October 26, 2009. It was also featured on the 2005 release Lil' Kim: Queen Bee Video Collection.

The music video follows a storyline in which the protagonist, Kim, releases a line of comestible dolls in her own likeness, intended to be used by gentlemen to practice cunnilingus. In the initial stanza, Kim rhapsodizes over the large, heterogeneous population of men with whom she has engaged in intercourse, and how they have satisfied her sexually and non-sexually. The figurine introduced during this sequence is christened "Candy Kim." The subsequent verse goes out to her African American fans currently residing in the corrections system, specifically those individuals who enjoy cannabis and onanism while envisioning themselves coupling with Kim; the singer suggests she is so prepossessing that images of her incite fisticuffs among the internees. She dubs herself "Pin-Up Kim," whose images festoon the cells of the incarcerated. The concluding section introduces yet another incarnation, "NightRider Kim." NightRider Kim drives an ebony Lamborghini at high velocity, decelerating only when she sees a comely man. The watchword for this final section is "She doesn't satisfy you...you satisfy her." She demands that the listener appease her, admonishing that, if he fails to do so, he must attempt the task again until he succeeds. She stresses that men should cunnilingus her "like it's rehearsal for a Tootsie commercial." This allusion reveals the basis for the title of the composition.

Sisqó does not appear in the video, explaining that his absence was due to a conflict with his record label, Def Jam, caused by the releases of the remix of his 2000 single "Thong Song" (with American rapper Foxy Brown) and his verse on American rapper DMX's 2000 single, "What These Bitches Want". In a 2017 interview with Complex, Sisqó said that he had been blacklisted by the label because of the aforementioned releases.

=== Reception and analysis ===
Women's studies academics Gail Dines and Jean M. Humez criticized Lil' Kim for her adherence to white female beauty standards, particularly blonde hair and blue eyes (pictured above).

The music video received positive reviews in media outlets; according to Preezy of The Boombox, it was "a staple on video countdowns" after its release. The reviewer praised "its eye-popping imagery and Kim's assets on display". An MTV News writer lauded the video's concept: "The doll personas give Kim a handful of fresh, new ways to wear a whole lot of nothing as she leaves even less to the imagination than usual". Jess Harvell of Pitchfork criticized the video, writing that it "is enough to make you join your local Andrea Dworkin fan club".

Scholars had differing opinions on the video's representation of sexuality. According to the CERCL Writing Collective, it showcases Lil' Kim's technique of "us[ing] the male body as an object of her own sexual desires and pleasures" and exemplifies a theme in the rapper's releases in which men are submissive to her sexuality. Feminist scholar Leslie Heywood interpreted the video as a "playful" way to address Lil' Kim as a celebrity and "a marketed ideal", writing that the rapper's "appeal to popular fantasy" and her "tough, sexy attitude" helped expand her artistic success. Alternatively, women's studies academics Gail Dines and Jean M. Humez criticized the video as "an apt metaphor for her self-commodification and use of white female beauty ideals". Even though they described the visual as "a tongue-in-cheek criticism of image making or white female beauty standards", they criticized the rapper for adhering to male fantasy through the emphasis on her blonde hair and blue eyes. They wrote that Lil' Kim would be remembered by "her participation in codes of pornographic descriptions of women" rather than her commentary on sexuality.

Selected scholars compared the video to those released by other rappers. In his essay "Supa Dupa Fly: Black Women as Cyborgs in Hiphop Videos", cultural critic Steven Shaviro wrote that the videos for "How Many Licks?" and American rapper Missy Elliott's 1997 single "The Rain (Supa Dupa Fly)" contain “stories of black female empowerment, in the face of deeply engrained racism and sexism". Feminist scholars M. L. Williams and T. C. M. Tyree wrote that the focus on beauty standards in the video continued with Nicki Minaj's video for "Stupid Hoe".

== Live performances and covers ==
Lil' Kim rapped the first verses of "How Many Licks?" during a 2010 event at Irving Plaza. During the performance, she had a wardrobe malfunction and her top almost fell down. She also performed the song in 2012 as part of her Return of the Queen Tour, as well as during a one-night show at the Gramercy Theatre the following year, wearing a red bodysuit and long black hair. In 2013, American drag queen Alaska Thunderfuck sang a cover version of "How Many Licks?", which Josh Middleton of Philadelphia praised as "outstanding".

== Track listing ==
CD single
| No. | Title | Length |
|---|---|---|
| 1. | "How Many Licks?" (featuring Sisqó) (Soul Society Remix (Clean)) | 3:48 |
| 2. | "How Many Licks?" (featuring Sisqó) (Sicknote 2 Step Remix (Clean)) | 4:13 |
| 3. | "How Many Licks?" (featuring Sisqó) (Simon Vegas Remix (Clean)) | 3:53 |
| 4. | "How Many Licks?" (featuring Sisqó) (Radio Edit (Clean)) | 3:57 |
| 5. | "Enhanced Video" | 3:53 |

12-inch single
| No. | Title | Length |
|---|---|---|
| 1. | "How Many Licks?" (clean album version) | 3:53 |
| 2. | "How Many Licks?" (instrumental) | 3:57 |
| 3. | "How Many Licks?" (dirty album version) | 3:53 |
| 4. | "How Many Licks?" (a cappella) | 3:59 |

Neptunes Remix
| No. | Title | Length |
|---|---|---|
| 1. | "How Many Licks?" (Neptunes Remix) (explicit version) | 4:44 |
| 2. | "How Many Licks?" (Neptunes Remix) (clean version) | 4:43 |

== Credits and personnel ==
Credits adapted from the liner notes of The Notorious K.I.M..

Recording locations

- Daddy's House Recording Studios (New York City)
- Trans Continental Studios (Orlando)

Personnel

- Mixing – Ed Raso
- Producer – Mario "Yellowman" Winans, Sean "Puffy" Combs
- Recording – Dave Wade, Stephen Dent
- Songwriting – Kimberly Jones, Mario Winans, Sean Combs

== Charts ==
=== Weekly charts ===
Weekly chart performance for "How Many Licks?"
| Chart (2000–2001) | Peak position |
|---|---|
| Australia (ARIA) | 57 |
| Australian Urban (ARIA) | 21 |
| Belgium (Ultratop 50 Flanders) | 7 |
| Belgium (Ultratip Bubbling Under Wallonia) | 11 |
| Netherlands (Dutch Top 40) | 5 |
| Netherlands (Single Top 100) | 6 |
| Germany (GfK) | 58 |
| US Billboard Hot 100 | 75 |
| US Hot R&B/Hip-Hop Songs (Billboard) | 36 |
| US Hot Rap Songs (Billboard) | 11 |
| US Rhythmic Airplay (Billboard) | 8 |

=== Year-end charts ===
Year-end chart performance for "How Many Licks?"
| Chart (2001) | Position |
|---|---|
| Belgium (Ultratop Flanders) | 37 |
| Netherlands (Dutch Top 40) | 70 |
| Netherlands (Single Top 100) | 85 |

== Release history ==
Release dates and formats for "How Many Licks?"
| Region | Date | Format(s) | Label(s) | Ref. |
|---|---|---|---|---|
| United States | November 21, 2000 | 12-inch vinyl | Queen Bee; Atlantic | |
| Germany | February 9, 2001 | CD | Warner Music | |
| Australia | March 19, 2001 | Maxi CD | Warner Music | |
| Germany | March 19, 2001 | Maxi CD | Warner Music | |
