= Lil' Kim =

American rapper (born 1974)

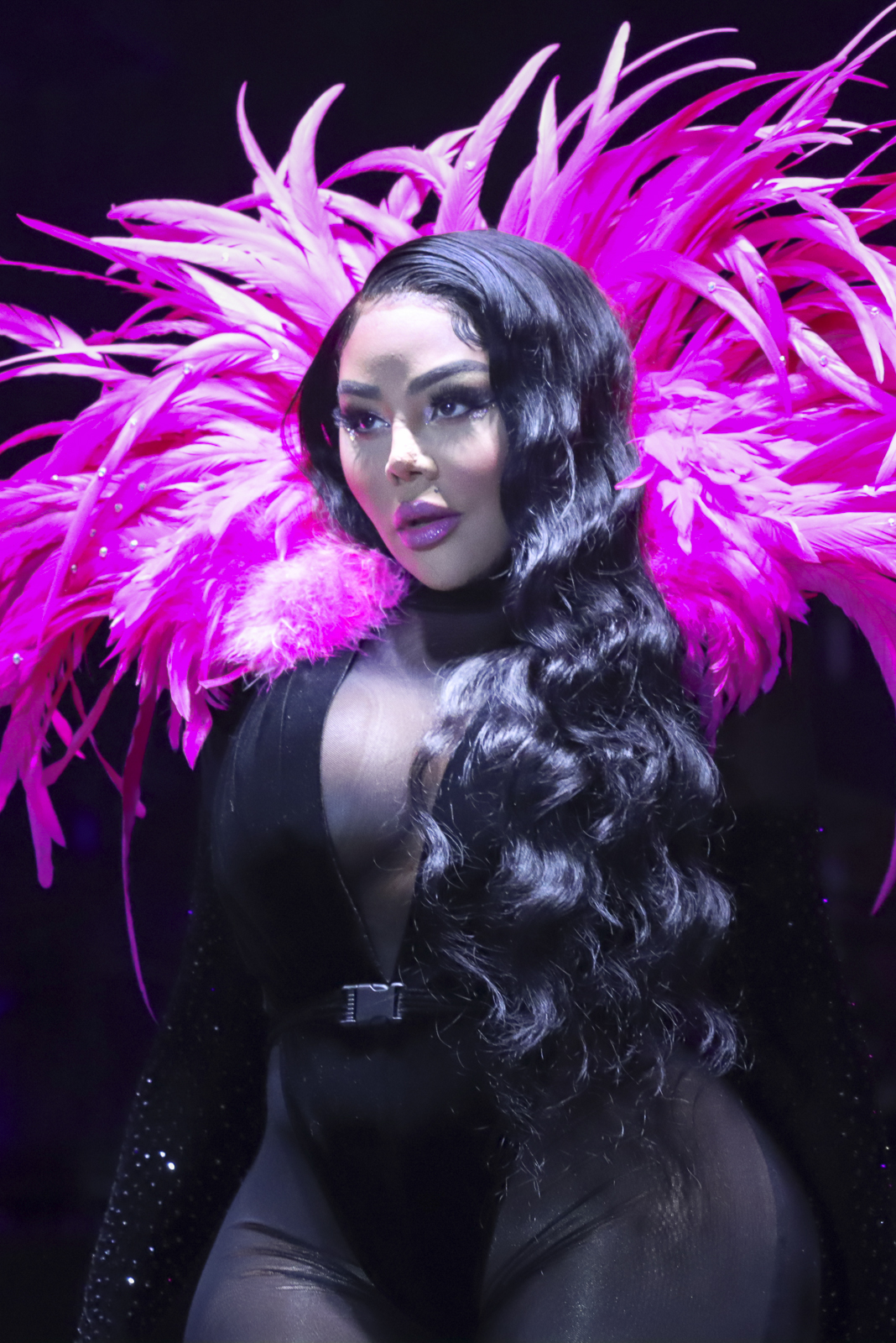
- Lil' Kim in 2022
- Born: Kimberly Denise Jones; July 11, 1974 (age 52); New York City, U.S.
- Other names: Queen Bee, Kimmy Blanco
- Occupations: Rapper; singer; songwriter
- Years active: 1994–present
- Partners: The Notorious B.I.G (1993-1997); Jeremy "Mr. Papers" Neil (2012–2014, 2020–2021); Tayy Brown (2024–2025)
- Children: 1
- Awards: Full list
- Musical career
- Genre: East Coast hip-hop
- Labels: eOne; Atlantic; Queen Bee; Big Beat; Undeas
- Formerly of: Junior M.A.F.I.A.
- Website: lilkim.com

Kimberly Denise Jones (born July 11, 1974), better known by her stage name Lil' Kim, is an American rapper, singer and songwriter. Known for her sexually charged lyrics and performances, she is one of the best-selling female rappers of all time with 45 million records sold. She also gained the nickname "Queen Bee".

Following a tumultuous childhood, Kim was discovered in 1994 by rapper The Notorious B.I.G. who invited her to join his group Junior M.A.F.I.A. which saw Kim appearing on various songs including the top twenty Billboard Hot 100 songs "Player's Anthem" and "Get Money". Kim went on to release her debut studio album, Hard Core (1996) which was certified double platinum in the US. The album garnered acclaim and spawned various singles including "Not Tonight (Ladies Night)" and "Crush on You"; the former peaked at number six on the Hot 100.

Kim featured on the song "Lady Marmalade" in 2001 which peaked atop the Hot 100, and won the Grammy Award for Best Pop Collaboration with Vocals. Kim went on to release The Notorious K.I.M. (2000), La Bella Mafia (2003), The Naked Truth (2005) and "9" (2019) with the first three peaking top six in the US. The albums garnered various singles including "Magic Stick" which peaked at number two on the Hot 100. Following a one-year prison sentence for perjury in 2005, Kim has released various mixtapes, appeared on Dancing with the Stars, and appeared in the reality television show, Girls Cruise (2019).

Kim and her music has since appeared on various listicles, including Complex's list of the 50 Best Rap Songs By Women and in 2012, she was listed on VH1's 100 Greatest Women in Music list at number 45, the second-highest position for a solo female hip-hop artist.

== Early life and education ==
Jones was born on July 11, 1974, in the Bedford–Stuyvesant neighborhood of Brooklyn, New York City, the second child of Linwood Jones, a former U.S. Marine. She has an older brother, Christopher. As a child, Jones attended Queen of All Saints Elementary School in Brooklyn. When she was nine years old, her parents separated, and Jones was raised by her father, with whom she had a tumultuous relationship. At fourteen, she left home, began living on the streets, and ultimately dropped out of high school.

As a teenager, Jones met Christopher Wallace, known professionally as the Notorious B.I.G. Wallace was a key figure in both her personal and artistic life, particularly after he gained popularity and influence through his relationship with Bad Boy Records. Jones attended Sarah J. Hale Vocational High School for two-and-a-half years. She and her friends often skipped school. As she was not completing her schoolwork, the decision was made for her to transfer to Brooklyn College Academy to finish her remaining year and a half of high school.

== Career ==
1994–1995: Junior M.A.F.I.A. and early success

In 1994, B.I.G. was instrumental in introducing and promoting the Brooklyn-based group Junior M.A.F.I.A. Jones, who had adopted the stage name Lil' Kim, was a member of the group. The group's debut album, Conspiracy, was released to mediocre reviews and moderate sales on August 29, 1995, but debuted at number eight on the U.S. Billboard 200 chart, selling 69,000 copies in its first week of release. Wallace wrote and ghostwrote most of the album's material. Three hit singles came from Conspiracy: "Player's Anthem", "I Need You Tonight", and "Get Money“. The RIAA certified Conspiracy a Gold album on December 6, 1995. "Player's Anthem" and "Get Money" were certified gold and platinum respectively. Lil' Kim's increasing popularity as a member of Junior M.A.F.I.A. allowed her to start a solo career shortly after the Conspiracy album was released. By late 1995, she began working on what would become her debut album, Hard Core.

=== 1996–2002: Hard Core and The Notorious K.I.M. ===
After a year with Junior M.A.F.I.A., Lil' Kim began her solo career by making guest performances on R&B albums and recording her debut album, Hard Core, which was released in November 1996. The album debuted at number 11 on the Billboard 200, the highest debut for a female rap album at that time, and number 3 on Billboard's Top R&B/Hip-Hop Albums, selling 78,000 copies in its first week of release and has sold over 5 million copies worldwide. It was certified double platinum by the RIAA on March 14, 2001, after having been certified gold on January 6, 1997, and platinum on June 3, 1997.

The album's lead single "No Time", a duet with Combs, reached the top spot of the Billboard Hot Rap Tracks chart and was certified gold by the RIAA. The following single was "Crush on You", a remixed version of the track that appeared on Hard Core. A remix of the album's track "Not Tonight" saw Lil' Kim team up with Missy Elliott, Angie Martinez, Da Brat, and Left Eye of TLC with the song peaking at 6 on the Billboard Hot 100. The song was part of the soundtrack to the Martin Lawrence movie Nothing to Lose, nominated for a Grammy Award, and certified platinum. She became the first female rapper to have three consecutive number ones on the Billboard Hot Rap Tracks chart.

In one stockholders' meeting of Warner Bros. Records, activist C. Delores Tucker criticized the label "for producing this filth", referring to perceived graphic sexual content in Lil' Kim's lyrics, and labeling them "gangsta porno rap“. In 1997, Lil' Kim promoted Hard Core by performing on P. Diddy's "No Way Out" tour. The tour continued through to 1998 and became one of the highest-grossing hip-hop tours of all time, grossing an estimated $16 million. That same year, she launched her own label, Queen Bee Entertainment.

From 1998 to 2000, Lil' Kim continued working under the management of B.I.G.'s best friend, Damion "D-Roc" Butler's "Roc Management", touring and modeling for various fashion and pop culture companies including Candie's, Versace, Iceberg, and Baby Phat.

In 1999, for a denim campaign fashion shoot, Lil' Kim debuted "Money Nails" designed by nail artist Bernadette Thompson. Thompson gave Lil' Kim a manicure with acrylic nails and pieces of an actual $100 bill. The look became an instant trendsetter spawning a wave of imitation looks and a trending search topic on Google (at a time before the internet was ubiquitous).

Her outfit at the 1999 MTV Video Music Awards received widespread media attention, fueled by the "shocked" response of presenter Diana Ross, who approached and jiggled Kim's exposed breast on national television. The Washington Post considered that the incident solidified Lil' Kim's "image of sexual fearlessness" and her career as "a fashion trendsetter".

On June 27, 2000, Lil' Kim released her second album, The Notorious K.I.M. The album marked a new image and revamped look for the rapper. Despite the limited success of its singles, the album debuted at number 4 on the Billboard 200 and number 1 on the Top R&B/Hip-Hop Albums chart, selling 229,000 copies in its first week. It was certified platinum by the RIAA, four weeks after its release. It was on this LP that the well-known hip-hop feud between Lil' Kim and Foxy Brown escalated. In 2001, Lil' Kim teamed up with Christina Aguilera, Pink, and Mýa to remake "Lady Marmalade", which was originally written about a bordello in New Orleans and performed by the group Labelle (which included diva Patti LaBelle) 25 years earlier.

The song was recorded for the Moulin Rouge! film soundtrack, released in April 2001, and stayed at number 1 on the Billboard Hot 100 for five weeks. The song also went to number 1 in 14 countries around the world. This was a major accomplishment for female rap, as well as for Lil' Kim, who scored her first and only number 1 Hot 100 hit and became the second solo female rapper in history to hit number one on the Billboard Hot 100 charts. "Lady Marmalade" also garnered Lil' Kim her first Grammy Award. The second single, "Kimnotyze", was released as the lead single of record producer DJ Tomekk's compilation album Beat Of Life, Vol 1. It was released in Switzerland, Austria, and Germany only. The song was successful, becoming Lil' Kim's third consecutive top 10 hit in Germany after her number 5 hit "Lady Marmalade“.

In 2002, Lil' Kim recorded a new entrance theme for then World Wrestling Entertainment (WWE) Women's Champion Trish Stratus entitled "Time to Rock 'n Roll", which was used during broadcasts, until Stratus's retirement. The single was released on WWE Anthology, a compilation of entrance theme music to various professional wrestling superstars. Lil' Kim released the song "What's The Word" in mid-2002. Despite not having an official release, it went on to peak at number 9 on the Bubbling Under R&B/Hip-Hop Singles chart. It would later be released on the Japan edition of her third studio album, La Bella Mafia, as a bonus track.

=== 2003–2008: La Bella Mafia, Prison, The Naked Truth and Ms. G.O.A.T ===
On March 4, 2003, Lil' Kim released her third studio album, La Bella Mafia. It debuted at number 5 on the Billboard 200, selling 166,000 copies in its first week, giving Lil' Kim her second consecutive top 5 album. The album received generally positive reviews from critics, receiving a score of 65 on Metacritic. A buzz single, "Came Back For You", was released ahead of the album, the music video for the song featured reality television personality Victoria Gotti.

The first single, "The Jump Off", featuring Mr. Cheeks, peaked at number 16 on the Billboard Hot 100. Follow up single, "Magic Stick", featuring 50 Cent, peaked at number two on the Billboard Hot 100, staying there for three weeks. The song did not have a commercial release or a music video but was successful due to high radio airplay, peaking at number one on the Billboard Airplay chart. A third US-only single, "Thug Luv", featuring Twista, was released in the last quarter of 2003 and peaked at number 60 on the Billboard Hot R&B/Hip-Hop Songs chart. The album was certified platinum in the US, selling over 1.1 million copies.

Lil' Kim promoted the album with a string of concerts, which also featured DMX and Nas. Lil' Kim was nominated for five Source Awards and won two ("Female Hip-Hop Artist of the Year", and "Female Single of the Year"). The album also got two Grammy Award nominations for Best Female Rap Solo Performance ("Came Back For You") and Best Rap Collaboration ("Magic Stick"). She was also nominated for Best Pop Collaboration with singer Christina Aguilera for the song "Can't Hold Us Down", from Aguilera's album Stripped.

Greg Thomas, an English professor at Syracuse University, began teaching "Hip-Hop Eshu: Queen B@#$H Lyricism 101“. Lil' Kim herself was a guest speaker. Professor Thomas considered Lil' Kim's lyrics "the art with the most profound sexual politics I've ever seen anywhere“. David Horowitz criticized the course as "academic degeneracy and decline“. Lil' Kim also made an appearance on the multi-platform videogame Def Jam: Fight for NY. Lil' Kim provided voice-overs for her part in the storyline, where the player may fight an opponent to have Lil' Kim as their girlfriend.

In 2004, Lil' Kim recorded a cover of "These Boots Are Made for Walkin'" which was used as the opening theme for Victoria Gotti's reality series Growing Up Gotti. That same year, Lil' Kim was featured on the remix of "Naughty Girl" by Beyoncé. In December 2004, Lil' Kim began recording a pilot for a VH1 reality show titled 718 Makeover. The 718 in the title is the area code for Brooklyn, where she grew up. The show did not make it to air.

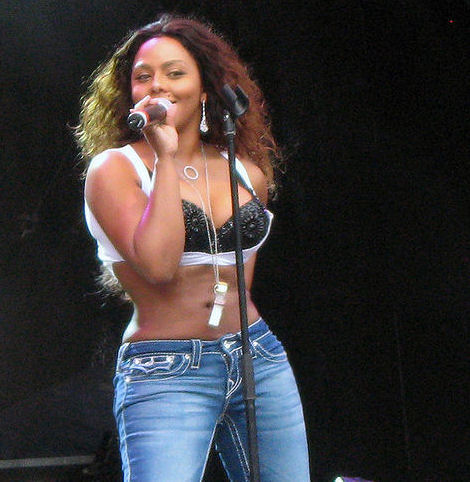
Lil' Kim performing at Way Out West festival, 2008

Lil' Kim released her fourth album, The Naked Truth, on September 27, 2005, while serving a federal prison sentence. It earned her a 5 mic rating from The Source, making her the only female rapper to ever receive a 5 mic rating. The album debuted at number 6 on the Billboard 200 chart, selling 109,000 copies in its first week of release, giving Lil' Kim her third top 10 debut on the chart. The Naked Truth did not sell as well as her previous works, it only managed to reach a gold certification by RIAA. She said that her prison sentence left her with no time to promote the project.

The music video for The Naked Truth's first single, "Lighters Up", was number one on BET's 106 & Park for two weeks. "Lighters Up" was a Top Ten hit on the Billboard Hot R&B/Hip-Hop Singles & Tracks chart. The single also reached number 67 on the German Single Chart, number 12 on the UK Top 75 and number 4 on the Finland Single Chart. The second single, "Whoa" was released on February 17, 2006. It reached number 22 on Airplay.

On March 9, 2006, BET premiered the show Lil' Kim: Countdown to Lockdown, which was filmed before Lil' Kim headed to prison. The show became the highest rated premiere in BET history, averaging 1.9 million viewers. In May 2006, Debbie Harry released a song in tribute to Lil' Kim called "Dirty and Deep" in protest of her conviction. The song was available for free from her official website. Dance Remixes, her first compilation album, was released on June 6, 2006. The album featured remixes of songs from The Naked Truth and Hard Core. A limited pressing released only in the US, it received no promotion due to Lil' Kim being in prison at the time of release and failed to chart. On August 31, 2006, Lil' Kim presented the award for Best Male Video at the 2006 MTV Video Music Awards; it marked her first televised appearance since being released from prison. She also made appearances on the show The Pussycat Dolls Present: The Search for the Next Doll and Pussycat Dolls Present: Girlicious in 2007 and 2008 as a judge.

In January 2008, Lil' Kim announced that she had parted ways with Atlantic Records, choosing to release future projects independently. She stated she had no hard feelings toward Atlantic, but felt comfortable enough with her knowledge of the music business to do it alone. Lil' Kim released her first mixtape Ms. G.O.A.T., an acronym for "Greatest of All Time", on June 3, 2008. It was produced by New York City DJs Mister Cee and DJ Whoo Kid. Among critics, the mixtape received generally positive reviews. It has been called a representation of Lil' Kim's return to the streets. Tito Salinas of All Hip Hop says "Lil' Kim shows that her time behind bars did not rust all of her swag away" on Ms. G.O.A.T. On the other hand, Ehren Gresehover of New York Mag says that although one of the tracks "The Miseducation of Lil' Kim" is not bad, he wished it was Lauryn Hill making a comeback instead.

=== 2009–2011: Dancing with the Stars and Black Friday ===
On March 10, 2009, the song "Girls" by Korean singer Seven featuring Lil' Kim was released through digital stores as his U.S. debut single. Lil' Kim appeared in the music video that was released on the same day. "Girls" was produced by Darkchild. On March 24, 2009, she released the song "Download" featuring R&B singers T-Pain and Charlie Wilson. It was written by Lil' Kim and T-Pain and produced by Trackmasters. The song samples "Computer Love" by Zapp. Although it missed the Hot 100, it did chart on the Billboard Hot R&B/Hip-Hop Songs chart, peaking at number 21.

Lil' Kim appeared on the eighth season of reality series Dancing with the Stars, which began airing on March 9, 2009. She was paired with professional dancer Derek Hough. They were eliminated on May 5, 2009, against Ty Murray and his partner Chelsie Hightower, putting Lil' Kim at fifth place among all thirteen contestants that season. Her elimination was met by many boos from the audience, as she was a consistent high-scorer and fan favorite.

On February 16, 2010, the Ludacris song "Hey Ho", which featured Lil' Kim and Lil Fate, was released as a promo single for his seventh studio album Battle of the Sexes. In June 2010, Lil' Kim started her 2010 Tour, her first headlining tour since 2000. It took her across the US, as well as Canada and Europe.

Lil' Kim released her second mixtape, Black Friday, on February 14, 2011. The video for the title track was released on February 16, 2011. The mixtape received mostly negative reviews from critics. It was made available for purchase via PayPal. In May 2011, Lil' Kim performed in South Africa as part of the music festival ZarFest alongside Fat Joe, Timbaland, and Ciara.

On June 19, 2011, Lil' Kim performed alongside G-Unit member Shawty Lo and hinted a possible working relationship with G-Unit Records. That same month, the song "Anything (To Find You)", by R&B singer Monica, which featured Lil' Kim, along with Rick Ross, was leaked. The song, which samples the Notorious B.I.G.'s "Who Shot Ya?", initially featured just Lil' Kim, but her second verse was removed to make room for Ross. Her vocals were then removed fully due to contractual issues with B.I.G.'s estate.

In August 2011, Lil' Kim performed four dates in Australia as part of the WinterBeatz Festival alongside Fabolous, Mario, 50 Cent and G-Unit. During the August 17 date in Perth, she joined 50 Cent on stage for a performance of "Magic Stick“. It marked the first time the pair had performed the song together. On November 28, 2011, Lil' Kim released a buzz single called "I Am Not the One“. She also announced that she would release an EP, but it was later shelved for unknown reasons.

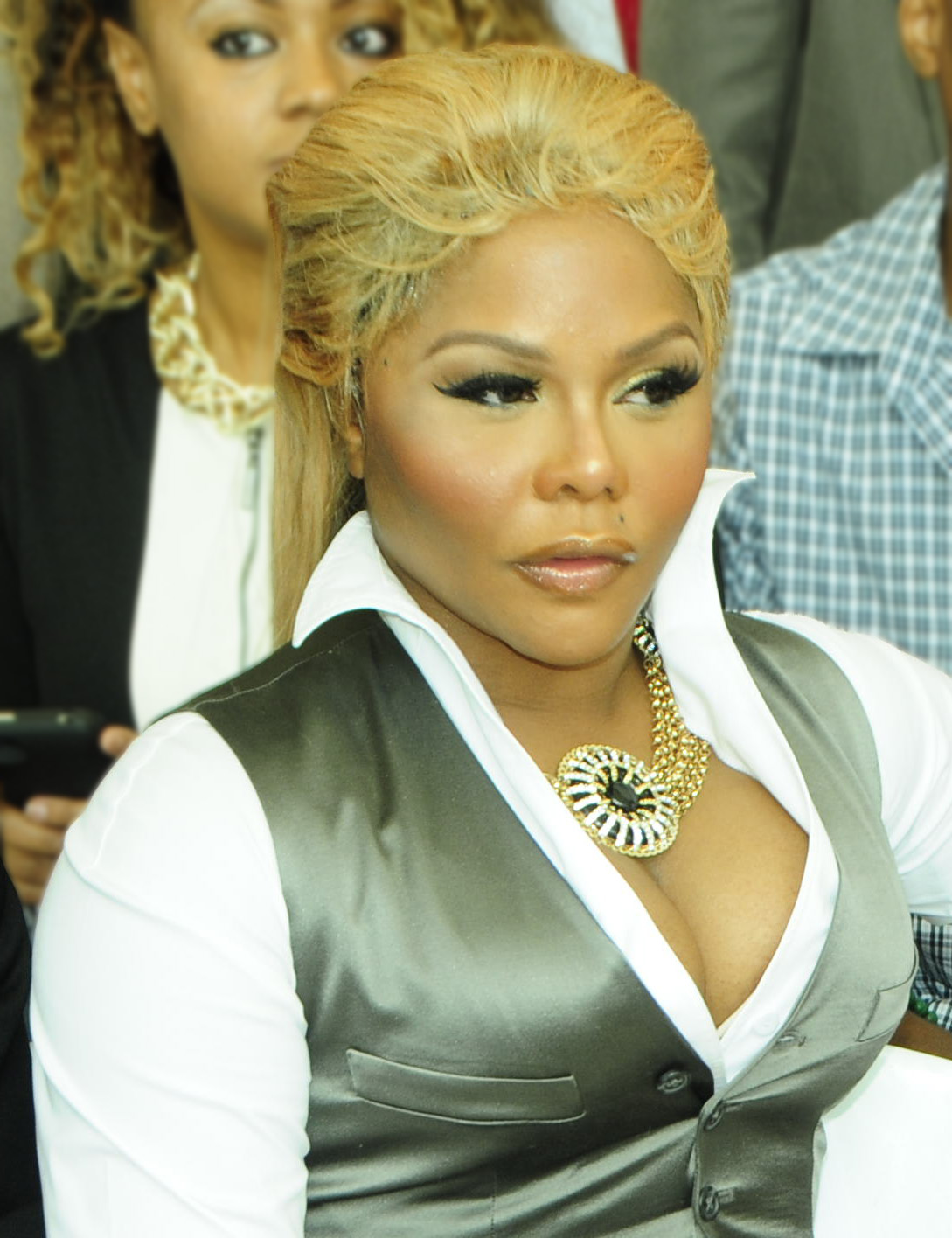
Lil Kim at the Mercedes Benz Fashion Week in 2012

=== 2012–2016: Hard Core mixtape and Lil Kim Season ===
In the summer of 2011, Lil' Kim began recording material for her fifth studio album. She had previously been under a restriction banning her from releasing new material as a result of her settlement with Trackmasters, but it had now been lifted. On Valentine's Day 2012, Lil' Kim released the song "If You Love Me" produced by Prince Saheb of Knockout Entertainment as a gift to her fans. That same month, it was announced she would make her return to the stage on BET's Rip the Runway. It marked her first televised performance in years.

In March 2012, during an interview with MTV's Sucker Free, Lil' Kim revealed that contract issues with production duo Trackmasters were the reason behind her album delay, saying „...contractually, by the courts, I could not record any music – I wasn't supposed to put any music out“. On March 23, 2012, the song "Keys to the City", a collaboration with Young Jeezy, was leaked to the Internet. Lil' Kim first mentioned the song during an interview with MTV's RapFix, saying "I have a song with another celebrity person that I know the world and my fans are gonna love... It's vintage Kim mixed with the new Kim". During the same RapFix interview, Lil' Kim also revealed another song, titled "I'm Ready", which she hopes to do with rapper 50 Cent. Lil' Kim also commented on the direction of her music, saying she was in "Kanye West mode“, adding „...You do whatever you want to do ...it's all about taking chances". Lil' Kim kicked off her Return of the Queen Tour on May 17, 2012, to positive reviews.

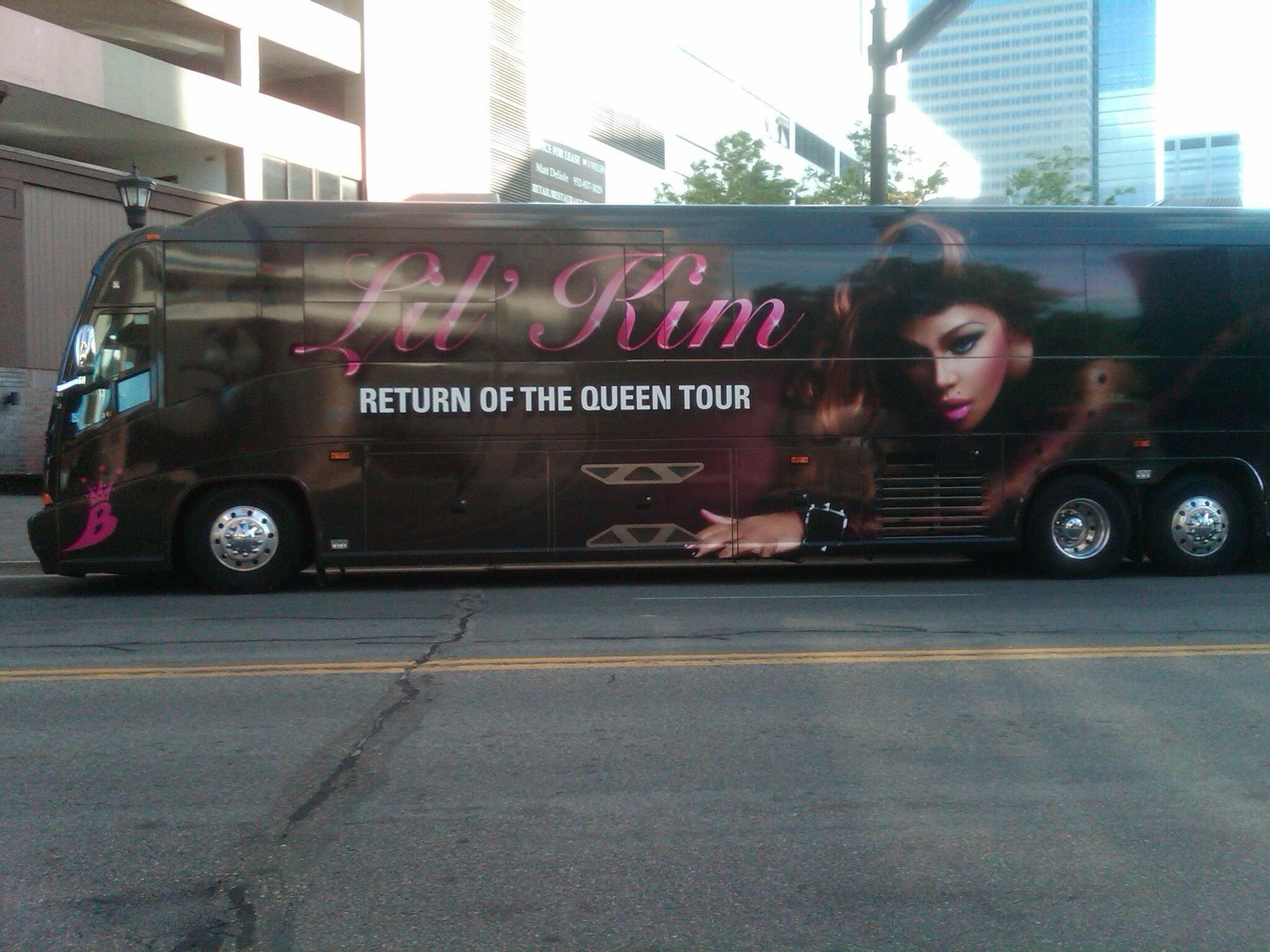
Return Of The Queen Tour bus

In a radio interview at Miami's 99 Jamz, Lil' Kim stated that her book, The Price of Loyalty, was on hold to coincide with the release of her new album. During an interview with XXL on April 26, 2013, she revealed that she does not have a name for the album yet, but the first official single would be out by mid year. Lil' Kim described the single, produced by Bangladesh, as "different" and "sweet dessert“. On July 11, 2013, Lil' Kim released the Rockwilder-produced single "Looks Like Money" as a free download for her fans on her birthday.

On July 26, 2013, Lil' Kim announced and released the cover art for a new mixtape, Hard Core 2K13, which would also serve as a sequel to her critically acclaimed debut album, Hard Core. The mixtape was originally set to be released on October 31, 2013, but for then unknown reasons, was pushed back. To make up for not releasing the mixtape, Lil' Kim released the singles "Dead Gal Walking" and "Kimmy Blanco" to the public, along with the track list. The track list revealed collaborations with French Montana, Miley Cyrus, Jadakiss, and Yo Gotti.

On August 2, 2014, Lil' Kim announced via her Twitter page that she would launch a concert tour to promote her forthcoming Hard Core Mixtape. Throughout the remainder of August, Lil' Kim released a number of remixes to popular songs, including Beyoncé's and Nicki Minaj's collaboration on "Flawless“, seemingly as a diss to Minaj, reigniting the feud between the two rappers.

On September 11, 2014, the Hard Core mixtape was released as free download on Kim's official website. In an interview with Revolt TV on the same day, she revealed that she, Iggy Azalea, and T.I. would collaborate on a song sometime in the future, saying "I don't know if it's going to be for my album or if we're just going to…we have other plans for it as well. But, I think we're going to do a double release“. In the same interview, she explained why the mixtape was pushed back twice, stating "When this project was supposed to come out I had got pregnant. I didn't know. [...] Once I became fully pregnant, I was working in the studio but at one point I couldn't work anymore, obviously“.

In 2016, her fourth mixtape Lil Kim Season was released. On the mixtape, she freestyles over several popular beats, Drake's "Summer Sixteen“, Rihanna's "Work“, and Desiigner's "Panda“. It received mixed reviews from critics. Jen Yamato from The Daily Beast wrote, "if anything, Lil Kim Season indicates that Kim's got her sights set on returning in a big way—and that she's collecting collaborators who might help her achieve it“.

=== 2017–present: Girls Cruise and 9 ===
In February 2017, Lil' Kim announced via her Instagram and an interview that she was working on a new album. Singer Faith Evans featured her on the song "Lovin You for Life" on the album The King & I, released on May 19, 2017. That same month, Lil' Kim along with Eve and Trina was featured on the remix of "I'm Better" by Missy Elliott. In November, Lil' Kim released a promotional single "Took Us a Break“, and was featured on the song "Wake Me Up" by rapper Remy Ma. In March 2018, Lil' Kim released another promotional single, "Spicy“, featuring rapper Fabolous.

On July 11, 2018, Lil' Kim released the single "Nasty One" from her highly anticipated album, but ultimately the track was not included on the album. That same day during an interview with Billboard, she said the album would be released in November of that year. A remix for the single was released on October 26, 2018, and featured Kranium, HoodCelebrityy, and Stefflon Don.

In September 2018, she announced that the debut single for her album "Go Awff" would be released at a later date. The song was eventually released on February 15, 2019. That same month, Kim was spotted in Barbados with fellow hip-hop stars Mýa and Chilli, friends Char DeFrancesco (husband to Marc Jacobs and one of Kim's best friends) and Tiffany, as well as MTV personalities Pretty Vee and B. Simone from MTV's Wild 'n Out.

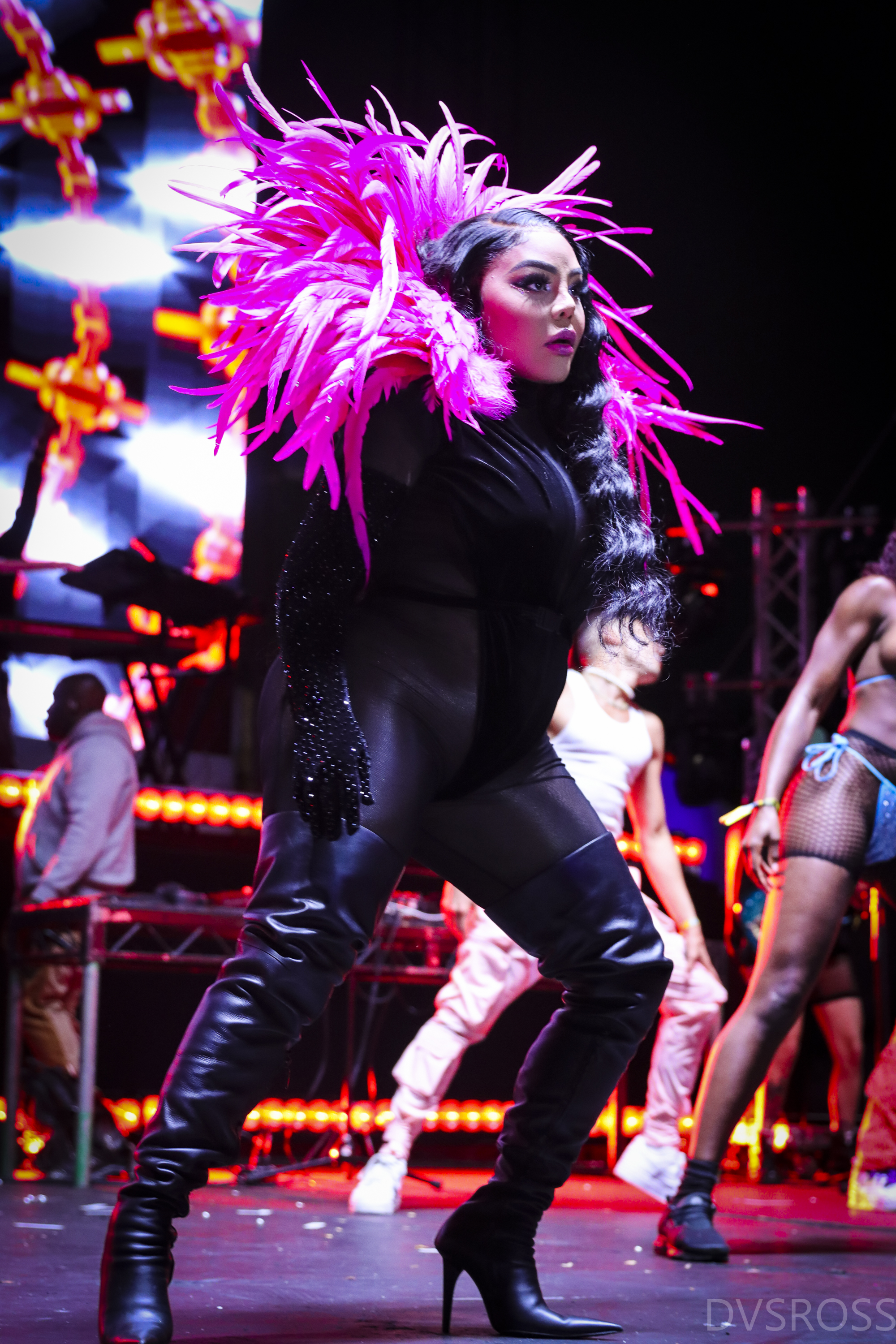
Lil Kim performing at WeHo Pride in 2022

It was later revealed that this was part of a VH1 reality show, Girls Cruise, for which Kim would serve as an executive producer. The show followed the group as they set sail to embark on a 10-day cruise in the Caribbean, visiting the countries of Barbados and Trinidad just in time for Carnival festivities. It also documented the group's bonding and new friendships with one another. The show premiered on July 15 with approximately 1.2 million viewers and ran for 11 episodes. It is unclear if there will be another season of the series.

In March 2019, Kim revealed that her new album would be titled 9 and added "There's a lot of meaning behind that“. Later that month, she announced that the album would be released on May 17, 2019. After a minor setback with her record label, eOne Music, that caused the album not be released on the original planned date, the project was postponed. On September 27, 2019, Kim released a second single, "Found You“, featuring City Girls and O.T. Genasis. The album later became available for pre-order on all digital-download platforms on October 4, 2019 (along with the track "Pray For Me" featuring Rick Ross and Musiq Soulchild), with a release date of October 11, 2019.

Upon its first week of release, the album charted on the R&B/Hip-Hop and Rap Album Sales, Digital Albums, Top Albums Sales, Independent Albums and Rap Album Sales with 2,627 pure sales.

During one of the reunion episodes for Girls Cruise, Kim revealed that the album would be a two-part project, stating "I recorded so many songs. I have a part one and a part two“. She also shared that her co-star, the Instagram comedian Vena "Pretty Vee" Excell, would appear on the record.

In October 2019, Kim revealed that she would collaborate with Missy Elliott and Paris Hilton on the follow-up to 9. In an interview with New York Radio 103.9, Kim confirmed that the City Girls would be involved with the follow-up to 9. She also stated that she would "love" to have Pretty Vee host her tour. On her November 8, 2019 appearance on The Real, Kim again confirmed that Paris Hilton and Missy Elliott would appear on 9's follow-up; she said the song "sounds like a classic Missy Elliott record but 'now.'"(1:20)

In 2021, Lil' Kim paid tribute to Queen Latifah at the BET Awards, alongside MC Lyte, Monie Love & Rapsody as she was awarded the Lifetime Achievement Award honoree. Donning an all white outfit & a Prada clip on her bangs, Kim performed Queen Latifah's 1993 single 'U.N.I.T.Y.' as and ode to her career.

In May 2023, Lil' Kim graced the cover of XXL's magazine's 'Legends Digital Cover Series' to celebrate 50 years of Hip-Hop. A number of photos were featured alongside an interview that assessed her career and impact. Lil' Kim quotes "Everyone calls me an icon, and it’s an honor to me. It makes me smile. It makes me happy to know that people look at me that way because I never really saw that for myself, but it just happened organically, and this is my place in hip-hop".

Curious (Remix) featuring Lil' Kim & Lola Brooke was released on October 27, 2023, on Eric Bellinger's song. It posed as a stand-a-lone single with an accompanying audio video. Lil' Kim briefly performed it at the 'One Music Festival' On October 31 in Atlanta.

In February 2024, Lil' Kim released 'Love For Ya' alongside Tayy Brown, a music video was released shortly after.

LEFT EYE (Remix) featuring Lil' Kim was released June 6, 2025 by Honey Bxby as a stand-a-lone single. An accompanying lyric video was posted & numerous live performances occurred mostly at Lil' Kim's concerts. The most notable performance was at the 2025 BET Awards where the song was performed at the Pre-show.

== Influences ==
Lil' Kim cited as her rap influences MC Lyte, Salt-N-Pepa and Roxanne Shanté. She was also influenced by Slick Rick, the Notorious B.I.G., Eric B. & Rakim, Queen Latifah and Mary J. Blige. Lil' Kim also cited Madonna as an influence, saying she modeled her own career on Madonna's, and labeling herself as the "Black Madonna".

== Other ventures ==
=== Products and endorsements ===
In 1998, Lil' Kim signed with Wilhelmina Models. That same year, she was announced as the face for the fashion brand Candie's alongside Brandy. She became the first and only rapper to endorse the brand to date. In 2000, Lil' Kim signed a deal with fashion house Iceberg, and also with cosmetics brand MAC to help endorse their VIVA GLAM line of lipsticks and lip glosses alongside Mary J. Blige.

The MAC VIVA GLAM III campaign, which was built around a plum-brown lipstick, helped raise $4 million for the company in one year and became the most successful VIVA GLAM campaign to date. Due to the success, the two signed on for a second year. The rapper also modeled for the urban fashion line Baby Phat in August 2000. In March 2001, Lil' Kim, along with several other artists, was in an Apple Mac computer commercial, demonstrating how to burn custom CDs on a Mac.

In 2004, she launched a designer watch collection with manufacturer and jeweler Jacob Arabo, Royalty by Lil' Kim. She also debuted her first clothing line, Hollyhood. She lent her voice to the video game Def Jam: Fight for NY, in which she was featured. In 2005, she collaborated on a shoe line with high-end brand Petite Peton. That same year, she appeared as a character in the limited-edition comic book "The Heist“, a collaboration between Marvel and Atlantic Records.

In August 2010, Lil' Kim signed a deal with Three Olives Vodka as the face for their Purple vodka. In September of that same year, she, along with her cousin Katrise Jones, opened their first beauty salon in Charlotte, North Carolina called Salon Se Swa. That same month, she launched her second clothing line, 24/7 Goddess Collection, at Charlotte, North Carolina's Fashion Week. In November 2012, Lil' Kim began endorsing Cîroc vodka, revealing her own cocktail, "Queen Bee“, and announcing herself as the "First Lady" of the brand.

In December 2020, Lil' Kim collaborated with PrettyLittleThing for a 60-74 piece inspired by the Y2K aesthetic. The collection consisted of dresses, tops, mesh outfits & coats. It emphasized body inclusivity, with sizes ranging from 0-30 & ranged from $10 for face masks up to $190 for a faux coat.

In 2021, Lil' Kim announced she'll be releasing her own cannabis brand ‘Aphrodisiak’ With Superbad Inc. which launched in 2022. "Two and a half years in the making, Lil’ Kim used her years of experience as a cannabis connoisseur to carefully craft her own cannabis brand, Aphrodisiak!" They're exclusive at California's Pineapple Express Hollywood dispensary.

In April 2022, Lil' Kim partnered with the American clothing brand 'Supreme' for an exclusive 'Queen Bee' range. This consisted of Shirts with her infamous Hard Core squat photo, button up shirts & skateboard decks. The collection sold out 2 1/2 minutes after the initial release & saw restocks sell out shortly after.

In October 2022, Lil' Kim became the face of the Canadian luxury outerwear brand 'Mackage' For their fall collection. On why they chose Lil' Kim, Mackage stated "Often imitated but never replicated, Lil’ Kim is the blueprint—a true original. Who better to represent one of our biggest drops of the season: Our first-ever Monogram collection. The legendary artist is an unapologetically powerful force who seamlessly traverses the worlds of fashion and music—and has paved the path for future generations. The artist is forever woven into the fabric of culture. The first to do it her way, a bold icon of making something your own. A trailblazer who embodies the Mackage spirit."

In October 2023, Lil' Kim appeared in an ad campaign for Telfar & UGG for their 'Krinkle collection. Lil' Kim posed alongside head designer Telfar Clemens with the new 'Logo Mini Krinkle' boots on their hands. She later appeared as a star guest when Telfar launched their first physical store in SoHo, in November 2024.

In June 2024, Lil' Kim's 'The Jump Off' off her 2003 album 'La Bella Mafia' was a part of the American Express commercials.

=== Philanthropy ===
In 2000, Lil' Kim embarked on a promo tour for her second studio album, The Notorious K.I.M., and the MAC AIDS Fund. She visited MAC cosmetics counters, interacted with fans, and helped raise money and awareness for people living with HIV/AIDS worldwide. She took part in MAC's Fashion Cares show in Toronto, Canada, raising close to one million for its AIDS committee. Her endorsement of MAC, with Mary J. Blige, raised $4 million for the fund.

In October 2001, Lil' Kim was featured on the R&B mix of the song "What's Going On“. She, along with several other popular recording artists, released the song as "Artists Against AIDS Worldwide“, with proceeds going to AIDS programs worldwide and also the September 11th Fund of the United Way. That same month, Lil' Kim performed at Breathe, a benefit concert for breast cancer research and treatment. Proceeds from the concert went to the UCLA Breast Center and the Breast Examination Center of Harlem, an outreach program of the Memorial Sloan Kettering Cancer Center.

On March 12, 2002, Lil' Kim walked her dogs in the 3rd annual "Paws for Style" fashion show. The event is held by Animal Fair magazine as a benefit for the Humane Society of New York. Items worn by the animals were later auctioned off online. In 2004 she launched her own foundation called Lil' Kim Cares. The foundation raises funds, resources and awareness for national programs that assist with issues such as homelessness, HIV/AIDS prevention and awareness, transitional living, child neglect, and violence against women.

Speaking of the foundation, Lil' Kim stated she planned to be primarily involved in causes that had affected her personally. On April 17, 2004, she participated in the 28th annual Toyota Pro/Celebrity Race. The event helped raise more than $100,000 for "Racing for Kids“, a non-profit program benefiting Southern California children's hospitals in Long Beach and Orange County. On August 24, 2004, Lil' Kim encouraged others to vote in the United States presidential election through the Rock the Vote campaign.

On March 10, 2005, Lil' Kim, along with several other artists, appeared in an episode of The Apprentice. Each artist was approached by contestants to donate a "personal experience" to be auctioned off for charity through music channel Fuse's "Daily Download" program, with proceeds going to the Elizabeth Glaser Pediatric AIDS Foundation. In September 2005, she teamed with fashion designer Marc Jacobs for a limited edition T-shirt line featuring images of the rapper. Marc Jacobs Loves Lil' Kim was sold exclusively at Marc Jacobs stores, with 100% of the proceeds going to a charity called The Door.

In 2005 Lil' Kim donated a diamond watch from her "Royalty" line to the World AIDS Day eBay auction, "Bid 2 Beat AIDS“. Proceeds went to LIFEbeat, an organization providing HIV/AIDS information to millions of young people annually. Through her foundation, Lil' Kim has given back to many, including teaming up with apparel company Mitchell & Ness and boxer Zab Judah to donate toys to underprivileged youth in Philadelphia in 2005, and joining MusiCares in 2007 for a silent auction, held at the Grammys On The Hill ceremony, to help raise funds for the foundation.

In 2007 Lil' Kim was a part of the 4th Annual Grammy Charity Holiday Auction, featuring a large variety of celebrity-signed memorabilia that people could bid on through eBay. On December 1, 2007, Lil' Kim partnered with Preserve Our Legacy and the New Jersey Stem Cell Research and Education Foundation to host a celebrity basketball game to raise awareness about various health issues plaguing minority communities.

On July 11, 2010, Lil' Kim launched her signature milkshake, the "Queen Bee“, at Millions of Milkshakes in West Hollywood, with proceeds going towards Wyclef Jean's Yéle Haiti Foundation. On February 9, 2013, she took part in the first annual Reality On The Runway fashion show. The event helped raise $300,000 for people infected with HIV/AIDS and increase awareness. All designs from the show were auctioned off online following the event, with a portion of the proceeds going to AIDS United.

Lil' Kim has been a longtime LGBT advocate, and has participated in many gay pride festivals, including the LGBT Pride March in New York City, as well as performing at Atlanta Black Pride and D.C. Black Pride.

== Personal life ==
In her teens, Jones dated Shawn Powell. The pair met at the Empire Roller Skating rink in Brooklyn. After a couple of months of seeing each other, Powell was arrested for robbery and sentenced to eight and a half years in prison. Jones and Powell continued their relationship, with Jones visiting frequently. They kept in touch by writing letters. The couple became engaged while Powell was incarcerated.

During this time, Jones met Christopher Wallace (The Notorious B.I.G.). She focused on starting her rap career and called off the engagement with Powell. In 1996, during the recording of her debut album, Jones became pregnant with Wallace's child. She did not make it public until 1999 during an interview with The Source. Jones decided to terminate the pregnancy. "I already knew the kind of relationship that Biggie and I had, and I knew that [having a child] was something that couldn't take place..“.

Wallace called Jones three days before his death and told her he loved her. In a 2010 interview with Ed Lover on Power 105, Jones revealed that Wallace assaulted her and she described an incident where he choked her to unconsciousness. In 2017, Jones admitted her relationship with Wallace was "very violent" after Jermaine Dupri claimed that he witnessed Wallace pull a pistol out on Jones.

On July 23, 1996, Jones was arrested for possession of marijuana after police raided Wallace's Teaneck, New Jersey home. Police smelled marijuana inside the home when they went to ask for someone to move an illegally parked car. Jones denied she was smoking, claiming she was "upstairs all day sleeping“. On March 17, 1999, Teaneck police issued an arrest warrant after Jones failed to turn up for court dates stemming from the arrest.

The warrant was not a top priority for the police, and was not made public until September 2003, after a story was published online by The Smoking Gun. Jones was later removed from Teaneck's wanted list in October 2003, after $350 in bail was posted on her behalf. Jones' attorney told reporters that she did not appear in court because she believed the case had been resolved.

In 2002, Jones started dating Damion "World" Hardy. The couple split in 2003, and she stated she was a victim of physical abuse leading to multiple nose jobs as a result of being punched.

On June 20, 2003, Jones had $250,000 worth of jewelry stolen while catching a flight at New York's John F. Kennedy International Airport after a bag, which she intended to carry on, was mixed up with eight other pieces of her luggage. The missing jewelry was recovered 10 days later, found wrapped up in a rag in a locker room for airline employees by a United Airlines worker.

In 2004, Jones dated record producer Scott Storch, whom she met when he offered her a ride to her hotel. The couple split after two months. In 2013, Storch revealed that he would have married Jones if the relationship had worked out. In 2007, Jones and Ray J briefly dated.

On March 17, 2005, Lil' Kim was convicted of three counts of conspiracy and one count of perjury for lying to a federal grand jury about her and her friends' involvement in a 2001 shooting outside the Hot 97 studios in Manhattan. During the trial of her co-manager, Damion "D-Roc" Butler, and her bodyguard, Suif "Gutta" Jackson, a former member of the hip-hop group Junior M.A.F.I.A., she testified before a grand jury that she did not know they were at the scene. However, video footage from a security camera placed all three at the scene, exiting the building.

Butler and Jackson pleaded guilty to gun charges. Jackson was sentenced to twelve years in federal prison as part of plea bargain in which he admitted to firing at least twenty rounds during the incident. The length of the sentence was said to have been influenced by his previous gun-related convictions.

In July 2005, Lil' Kim was sentenced to one year in prison, thirty days' home detention upon release from custody, and three years of probation. She served the entirety of her sentence at the Federal Detention Center, Philadelphia in Center City, Philadelphia. She was released on July 3, 2006, after serving approximately 12 months. Her Federal Bureau of Prisons (BOP) supervision ended on August 2, 2006.

On June 9, 2014, Jones gave birth to a daughter named Royal Reign. Royal has started modeling, walking the catwalk in the New York Fashion Week Show in 2023 as part of the 13th Annual Rookie USA Fashion Show.

Lil' Kim was in a relationship with Royal's father, Jeremy Neil, who goes by the rap name Mr. Papers from 2012 to 2014, and then again from 2020 through at least part of 2021. He has called her his "wife" before although they have never been legally married. Their initial breakup was somewhat contentious, with Lil' Kim claiming that he was a domestic abuser and Mr. Papers alternatively dissing her and performing somber freestyle raps lamenting the circumstances and lack of access to Royal. They have not mentioned being a couple on social media since 2021 and Mr. Papers was referred to as Lil' Kim's ex again in news reports that were released in 2022, but they never formally broke up with each other publicly.

According to an interview released in April 2024, Lil' Kim was dating Tayy Brown, a rapper who is signed to her record label. They had a very public break up and are no longer seeing or working with each other.

Jones identifies as a Christian.

== Feuds ==
=== Foxy Brown ===
Once high school friends, Lil' Kim and fellow Brooklyn rapper Foxy Brown originally remained close despite becoming associates of clashing hip-hop groups Junior M.A.F.I.A. and the Firm, respectively. In 1995, they collaborated with Da Brat for the remix of "No One Else" by Total. The following year, they were featured in the Hot 97 New York Fashion Show and appeared on the covers of The Source and Vibe. However, their first dispute developed after both of their debut studio albums were scheduled for release a week apart in November 1996.

In 1996, media outlets noted similarities between the sleeve covers of Lil' Kim's debut album Hard Core and Brown's debut album Ill Na Na, where the two were shown wearing the same outfit. In 1997, the feud led to the deterioration of their friendship, and resulted in the cancellation of a collaborative album Thelma & Louise. Brown noted that the breakdown of their relationship was influenced by their conflicting entourages. They first attempted a reconciliation in 1998 after Lil' Kim called Brown and her mother after the two were held at gunpoint during a house burglary.

In January 1999, critics noted the track "My Life" from Brown's second studio effort Chyna Doll as being an "open appeal" to their friendship. In the song, Brown describes their relationship being "lost for pride". Later in the album, however, Brown attacks "mistresses“. As music journalist Evelyn McDonnell noted, this seemed pointed at Lil' Kim. Critics thought the records were a subtle diss to Lil' Kim, especially since during this time Brown had supported Lil' Kim's rival, singer Faith Evans, in multiple interviews. In February 1999, some music critics noted that Brown "suddenly sounded 'exactly' like Lil' Kim“.

In late May 1999, Lil' Cease's single "Play Around", featuring Lil' Kim and Diddy, was released and featured on his debut The Wonderful World of Cease A Leo. In the song, after Lil' Kim's verse, Diddy raps: "Stop trying to sound like her too bitches"; a diss aimed at Foxy Brown. The line spurred enough controversy that a writer remarked, "It's finally coming out. Foxy Brown bites worse than a pit bull“. Additionally, Lil' Kim's guest appearance on the remix version of Mobb Deep's song "Quiet Storm" and her second album's title track, "The Notorious K.I.M“., were both released as diss records aimed at Foxy Brown.

Angered by Lil' Kim's response, Brown collaborated with longtime associates Capone-N-Noreaga on the track, "Bang, Bang“. In the track, Brown mimicked Lil' Kim's interpretation of MC Lyte's famous disstrack "10% Dis", and went on to recite: "You and Diddy y'all kill me with that subliminal shit“. Towards the end of her verse, Brown mocked Lil' Kim's grieving for the loss of rapper the Notorious B.I.G. by remarking: "Let the nigga [Biggie] rest in peace, and hop off his dick, bitch do you“.

On February 26, 2001, at 3 p.m., as Lil' Kim left New York radio station Hot 97, over twenty shots were fired between two groups of three men. One of the men, Capone of Capone-N-Noreaga, was entering the Hot 97 building to promote DJ Clue's new album, The Professional 2 (which happened to have also featured both Lil' Kim and Foxy Brown). An affiliate, Efrain Ocasio from Capone's entourage, was shot in the back; both Lil' Kim's and Capone's groups denied any involvement in the shooting. However, detectives later informed The New York Daily News that it was a result of the verses Foxy Brown recited in "Bang, Bang“.

Shaken up by the incident, Brown tried to reach out to Lil' Kim for a truce. Brown stated, "I really don't know how it started. But Russell [Simmons] and I, we got together, and I said, 'Russell, I want to call a truce.' I want to have a sit-down with Kim. I don't care what it is. Let's just end it. We can even do a collaboration. We're bigger than this. If it has to start with me, let it start with me“. Brown extended an olive branch to Lil' Kim's camp, however Lil' Kim had cut all ties with Diddy and Bad Boy associates and wanted no communication with Brown whatsoever. In March 2005, Lil' Kim was convicted of lying about the shooting to a federal grand jury. On July 6, 2005, she was sentenced to prison for three counts of perjury and one count of conspiracy.

During the four years before Lil' Kim's sentencing, she and Brown exchanged subtle diss records, among them Lil' Kim's La Bella Mafia, "Quiet“, and "Guess Who's Back"; and in turn, Brown's Ill Na Na 2: The Fever and various mixtape freestyles. In the midst of these diss recordings, radio host Doug Banks interviewed Brown in 2003, hoping she would disclose further details pertaining to their dispute. Brown claimed that Lil' Kim was allegedly jealous that Biggie was to include Brown in his Junior M.A.F.I.A. collective. Brown also added that a tell-all book disclosing the feud would be released for Christmas 2003. In her final comments on the dispute, Brown stated: "Kim is the only female artist that keeps me on my toes. She's the only one that I can look at; and any other artist that says they don't have that one person that keeps them driven... is lying“.

Following her release from prison, Lil' Kim no longer acknowledged Brown. Brown, on the other hand, has consistently targeted Lil' Kim in her music and concert venues since the latter's prison release.

On May 17, 2012, Lil' Kim gave an interview to a radio show, The Breakfast Club. When asked about whether or not she had spoken to Brown at all in recent years, she replied, "I don't even know her. And when I say that; I don't know who she is to these days. I wouldn't even know what her voice sounds like“.

=== Nicki Minaj ===
Lil' Kim has been embroiled in a feud with rapper Nicki Minaj since Minaj's success with Pink Friday. With Lil' Kim and media critics noticing resemblances with her on the Sucka Free mixtape, Lil' Kim accused Minaj of copying her image saying, "If you are going to steal my swag, you gonna have to pay. Something gotta give. You help me, I help you. That's how it goes to me“. Minaj's single "Roman's Revenge" with Eminem was believed by critics to be a response to Lil' Kim's comments, although at the time she denied this.

Minaj responded to the situation in an interview on The Angie Martinez show, saying "She picked a fight with Foxy, then she picked a fight with Eve, then she picked a fight with Remy, then it was Mrs. Wallace, then it was Nicki Minaj. Every time you in the news, it's 'cause you gettin' at somebody! Where's your music? Put your music out, and when I see your name on Billboard, that's when I'll respond to you. Other than that, goodbye. It's Barbie, bitch“.

Lil' Kim reignited the feud following the release of her mixtape Black Friday, an album that directly referenced Nicki Minaj, via her debut album title and freestyling on Minaj's songs such as "Did It On'em" (that became "Pissin' On'em"). The mixtape cover featured artwork that showed Lil' Kim decapitating Minaj with a sword. A fragment of Minaj's diss track "Tragedy" was released online in April 2011, featuring lyrics "Pink Friday, Eminem, 8 Mile/ It must hurt to sell your album on PayPal“. Following the release of Minaj's second album, Pink Friday: Roman Reloaded, critics suggested that the tracks "Stupid Hoe" may have contained attacks at Lil' Kim. Lil' Kim later suggested in an interview with Power105's Breakfast Club that the song "Automatic" from Minaj's second album was similar to her unreleased material, also calling Minaj "obnoxious" and "catty“.

In a 2018 interview with Genius, Minaj alluded to the situation with Lil' Kim, seemingly confirming that the track "Roman's Revenge" was about the feud, saying, "Someone got at me. A veteran got at me, and I hit them with 'Roman's Revenge' and then I kept on going“. In 2021, Lil' Kim stated on the red carpet of the BET Awards that she would like to do a Verzuz with Minaj.

== Legacy ==
The idea of female rappers owning their sexuality is nothing new in the modern hip-hop landscape. However, this wasn't always the case, and there's arguably one woman to thank -- Lil' Kim ... Before she came out, it was argued that sexy women in hip-hop were exploited by the industry, reduced to mere video girls cast to dance around the male breadwinner. Kim reversed this notion, announcing her arrival to hip-hop with a provocative promo poster that saw her clad in a leopard print bikini and matching feather-trimmed robe.

— i-D writer Jake Hall.

Several media outlets have referred to Lil' Kim as the "Queen of Rap“, and by the alias she uses, "Queen Bee“. Newsweek has called her the "First Lady of Rap“, with editor Allison Samuels writing in 2000 that she has "transcended the male-dominated world of rap to become one of America's sassiest, most engaging icons“.

Lil' Kim's music catalog features undertones of sex-positive feminism and the importance of female pleasure, instead of the man as the "dominant priority“, through explicit lyrics about sex. Dazed considered her "the first high-profile female rapper to flip the script on female objectification in the rap industry". For NME's editor Jordan Bassett, she "out-filthed the male rappers at every turn“.

According to BBC News, Hard Core (1996) was the most successful debut album by a female hip-hop artist at the time; the album saw her "inhabit the territory of sexual edginess and hardcore rap, traditionally the preserve inhabited by male artists“. In 2000, Los Angeles Times writer Isaac Guzman wrote that her debut solo album created a path for a new wave of female rappers, with her at the forefront of her generation, and established her as "the raunchiest, hardest, sexiest, most glamorous woman in all of hip-hop“.

During that time, several new female hip-hop artists modeled themselves after her stylistically. Placing Hard Core at number 80 on their list of "Best Rap Albums of the 90s“, Complex magazine stated, "when Lil Kim released her debut album—women in hip-hop finally had options, paths to follow and models [...] she was the raunchiest woman you ever heard on the mic“. The Village Voice writer Joan Morgan contended that the album "transformed her into a cultural icon“, opining that it put an emphasis on sex appeal, looks, and packaging as a priority for female rappers. Camera Obscura listed her as one of the late twentieth-century "self-marketers of female trouble" in music, along with Janet Jackson and Tina Turner. In 2020, XXL wrote that "twenty-five years later, no rapper is more influential to the new female rhymers“.

Aside from music, Lil' Kim is also known for a risk-taking and luxurious approach to fashion that has inspired many artists. She has been named as a fashion icon by various media outlets. Vogue editor-at-large André Leon Talley called her "the black Madonna“. Designers such as Marc Jacobs, Versace, and Giorgio Armani have credited Lil' Kim as an inspiration. Her collaboration with nail artist Bernadette Thompson in wearing her "money nails" is described by Harper's BAZAAR to have been "a defining moment in the history of hip-hop and beauty" and lead to mainstream fashion's acceptance of intricate nail art. A replica of the money nails she wore has been exhibited in the Museum of Modern Art alongside other notable fashion items such as the Wonderbra and red lipstick.

Some artists who have named Kim as influence include Rihanna, Cardi B, Megan Thee Stallion, Kash Doll, Bree Runway, Teyana Taylor, Doja Cat, Rosalía, Hitmaka, Casanova, Spice, Zaytoven, Stefflon Don, Flo Milli, Nicki Minaj, Ivorian Doll, Cupcakke, Saweetie, Ice Spice, Miley Cyrus, Iggy Azalea, Ms Banks, Lola Brooke, Jhené Aiko, City Girls, DreamDoll, Latto, Macy Gray, Baby Tate, and Erica Banks. Actress Taraji P. Henson said that Lil' Kim inspired her portrayal of Empire character Cookie Lyon.

== Awards and nominations ==
Throughout her career, Lil' Kim has earned numerous honors and awards. Her debut Hard Core was certified double platinum by the RIAA, and is considered a classic hip-hop album. As of 2007, Lil' Kim has sold over 15 million albums worldwide. Her songs "No Time“, "Big Momma Thang" and "Ladies Night" were listed on Complex Magazine's "The 50 Best Rap Songs By Women", at number 24, 13, and 7, respectively. Her song "Lady Marmalade" with Christina Aguilera, Mýa, and Pink, is one of the best-selling singles of all time worldwide, with sales of over 5.1 million worldwide. Lady Marmalade went number one on the US Billboard Hot 100, making her one of only a few female rappers to have a number one on that chart. The song won a 2002 Grammy Award in the category of "Best Pop Collaboration with Vocals“.

Lil' Kim was ranked as one of the top 50 greatest MCs of all time in Kool Moe Dee's 2003 book, There's a God on the Mic. In 2012, Lil' Kim was honorably listed on VH1's "100 Greatest Women In Music" at number 45, placing her in the fourth highest position for a female rapper. In 2014, she was included in Billboard's list of the "31 Female Rappers Who Changed Hip-Hop“. In 2016, VH1 honored Lil' Kim with VH1 Hip-Hop Honors and WEEN Award honored Kim with Icon Award because of her contribution to hip-hop.

In June 2018, Lil' Kim was honored with a proclamation by the New York City Council's Black, Latino, and Asian Caucus (BLAC) as part of the annual African-American Music Appreciation Month for her contributions to hip-hop. Along with the proclamation, she also accepted the New York City 12th Council District Arts and Music Award and the city's Power Of Influence Award. In 2019, Lil' Kim was honored by BET Hip Hop Awards with the I Am Hip Hop Award.

In 2023, Spotify honored Lil’ Kim with the 'Women in Hip-Hop Fashion Icon' Award. This specific recognition took place in March 2023 during Spotify's inaugural "Feelin' Myself" Fashion Show in Los Angeles. The event was part of a larger initiative to celebrate the intersection of music and fashion within hip-hop's 50th-anniversary year.

In November 2024, Lil' Kim was honored at the 6th Annual Pow(H)er Awards for 'Woman Of The Year', Taking place at The Dream Hotel in New York City.

== Discography ==
Studio albums

- Hard Core (1996)
- The Notorious K.I.M. (2000)
- La Bella Mafia (2003)
- The Naked Truth (2005)
- 9 (2019)

Collaboration albums

- Conspiracy with Junior M.A.F.I.A. (1995)

== Tours ==
Headlining

- The Notorious K.I.M. Tour (2000)
- 2010 Tour (2010)
- Return of the Queen Tour (2012)

Joint tours

- No Way Out Tour (with Puff Daddy & The Family) (1997–1998)
- Winterbeatz Australia (with Fabolous, Mario, 50 Cent and G-Unit) (2011)
- Bad Boy Family Reunion Tour (2016)
- The Way It Is 20th Anniversary Tour (with Keyshia Cole) (2025)
- PCD Forever Tour (Special Guest) (2026)

== Filmography ==
=== Film ===
Year	Title	Role	Notes
1999	She's All That	Alex	
2000	Longshot	Herself	
2001	Zoolander	Herself	
2002	Juwanna Mann	Tina Parker	
2003	Those Who Walk in Darkness	Soledad O'Roark	
2003	Gang of Roses	Chastity	
2004	You Got Served	Herself	
2004	Nora's Hair Salon	Herself	
2005	Lil' Pimp	Sweet Chiffon	Video
2008	Superhero Movie	Xavier's daughter	
2021	Miracle Across 125th Street	Zsa Zsa Hottest	

=== Television ===
Year	Title	Role	Notes
1997	Soul Train	Herself	Episode: "Lil' Kim/Levert/Ray J"
1997	It's Showtime at the Apollo	Herself	Episode: "Episode 10.16"
1999	V.I.P.	Freedom Fighter	Episode: "Mao Better Blues"
2000	Total Request Live	Herself	Episode: "Lil' Kim"
2000	It's Showtime at the Apollo	Herself	Episode: "Episode 14.5"
2000	The Cindy Margolis Show	Herself	Episode: "Big Pimpin'"
2001	Making the Video	Herself	Episode: "Lady Marmalade"
2001	DAG	Gina Marie	Episode: "Guns and Roses"
2001	Moesha	Diamond	Episode: "Paying the Piper"
2001	The Parkers	Herself	Episode: "Take the Cookies and Run"
2003	American Dreams	Shirley Ellis	Episode: "Another Saturday Night"
2003	Ride with Funkmaster Flex	Herself	Episode: "Lil' Kim"
2003	MOBO Awards	Herself/Co-Host	Main Co-Host
2004–05	The Apprentice	Herself	Episode: "Crimes of Fashion" & "Bling It On"
2005	Access Granted	Herself	Episode: "Lil Kim: Lighters Up"
2006	Lil' Kim: Countdown to Lockdown	Herself	Main Cast
2007	The Game	Herself	Episode: "Media Blitz"
2007	Boulevard of Broken Dreams	Herself	Episode: "Glenn Quinn/Lil' Kim"
2007	The Pussycat Dolls Present: The Search for the Next Doll	Herself/Guest Judge	Episode: "Welcome to the Dollhouse"
2008	Pussycat Dolls Present: Girlicious	Herself/Judge	Main Judge
2009	Dancing with the Stars	Herself	Contestant: Season 8
2009	Paris Hilton's My New BFF	Herself/Judge	Episode: "Have My Back"
2011	Love & Hip Hop: New York	Herself	Episode: "A Toast To Kimbella"
2012	Pregnant in Heels	Herself	Episode: "Rosie's Relationship Retreat"
2014	Celebrities Undercover	Jamilla (Herself)	Episode: "Fantasia Barrino and Lil Kim"
2014	David Tutera's CELEBrations	Herself	Episode: "Queen B's Baby Bash"
2017	Hollywood Medium with Tyler Henry	Herself	Episode: "Lil' Kim/Jamie-Lynn Sigler and Lance Bass/Dr. Drew"
2018–19	Hip-Hop Evolution	Herself	Recurring Guest
2019	Girls Cruise	Herself	Main Cast
2019	Song Association	Herself	Episode: "Lil' Kim"
2021	American Gangster: Trap Queens	Herself/Narrator	Main Narrator: Season 2

=== Music videos ===
Year	Title	Artist
1988	"Teenage Love"	Slick Rick
1993	"Party and Bullshit"	The Notorious B.I.G.
1996	"Floatin' On Your Love"	The Isley Brothers featuring Angela Winbush
1996	"If Your Girl Only Knew"	Aaliyah
1997	"Hot Like Fire"	Aaliyah
1997	"The Rain (Supa Dupa Fly)"	Missy Elliott
1997	"Sock It 2 Me"	Missy Elliott featuring Da Brat
1997	"We'll Always Love Big Poppa"	The LOX
2000	"It's So Hard"	Big Pun featuring Donell Jones
2000	"I Just Wanna Love U (Give It 2 Me)"	Jay-Z
2001	"Feelin' on Yo Booty"	R. Kelly
2002	"Miss You"	Aaliyah
2002	"Go Head"	Queen Latifah
2003	"These Days"	Alien Ant Farm
2005	"Rumors"	Maino
2012	"Everywhere We Go"	French Montana & Wale
2019	"The Golden Child"	Papoose & Remy Ma & Angelica Vila

=== Video games ===
Year	Title	Role
2004	Def Jam: Fight for NY	Herself (voice)

=== Documentary ===
Year	Title
2005	There's a God on the Mic
2007	Life After Death: The Movie – Ten Years Later
2017	Can't Stop Won't Stop: A Bad Boy Story

== See also ==
- Honorific nicknames in popular music
- List of artists who reached number one in the United States
- List of Billboard Hot 100 number-one singles of 2001
- Billboard Year-End Hot 100 singles of 2001
