= There's a God on the Mic =

2003 book by the old school hip hop MC Kool Moe Dee

There’s a God on the Mic: The True 50 Greatest MCs
- Author: Kool Moe Dee
- Cover artist: Lorie Pagnozzi
- Language: English
- Subject: Hip hop
- Genre: Non-fiction
- Publisher: Da Capo Press / Thunder’s Mouth Press
- Publication date: 2003
- Publication place: United States
- Pages: 224 pp
- ISBN: 1-56025-533-1
- OCLC: 52424168
- Dewey Decimal: 782.421649/092/2 21
- LC Class: ML394 .K66 2003

There's a God on the Mic: The True 50 Greatest MCs is a 2003 book by the old school hip hop MC Kool Moe Dee, where he ranks what he believes to be the Top 50 greatest MCs of all time, giving a breakdown of each artist. The book also features a foreword from Chuck D and includes full color photos from hip hop photographer Ernie Paniccioli.

== MCing elements ==
Kool Moe Dee breaks MCing down into several different elements in order to effectively judge the skills of the artists – this includes originality, concepts, versatility, vocabulary, substance, flow, flavor, freestyle, vocal presence, live performance, poetic value, body of work, industry impact, social impact, longevity, lyrics, and battle skills.

== MCs on the list ==
The list includes artists from a wide range of eras and regions, including old school hip hop legends such as Grandmaster Caz, Melle Mel, and Kool Moe Dee himself, Golden age hip hop MCs such as Rakim, Kool G Rap, Big Daddy Kane, KRS-One, Slick Rick, Chuck D, Pharoahe Monch, MC Shan, Scarface, Snoop Dogg, and Ice Cube, and more recent MCs such as Mystikal, Big Pun, Ras Kass, and Lil' Kim.

The book also includes other MCs on several additional lists scattered throughout the book, such as “11 Best Kept Lyrical Secrets” and “10 Best Hip-Hop Pop Kings” - Kool Moe Dee also explains ten of his thirteen “battle laws” in the book.

== Sequel ==
In There's A God On The Mic, Kool Moe Dee refers to a follow-up book called The True 50 Greatest Groups In Hip-Hop, which has so far not been released.
