= Girls Cruise =

- Genre: Reality
- Starring: Lil' Kim; Mýa; Chilli; B. Simone; Pretty Vee; Tiffany; Char
- Opening theme: “The Jump Off” (performed by Lil’ Kim)
- Country of origin: United States
- Original language: English
- No. of seasons: 1
- No. of episodes: 11

Production
- Executive producers: Lil' Kim; Elena Diaz; Sitarah Pendelton; Dan Cesareo; Lucilla D’Agostino; Anthony Sylvester; Ashley McFarlin Buie; Shelley Sinha
- Running time: 43 minutes
- Production companies: Big Fish Entertainment; MGM

Original release
- Network: VH1
- Release: July 15 – September 30, 2019

Girls Cruise is an American reality television series. It stars rapper Lil' Kim who serves as executive producer along with singers Mýa and Chilli of TLC. Announced in February 2019, Girls Cruise finds Lil' Kim and her celebrity friends embarking on a vacation of a lifetime in the series described as one of self-exploration and sisterhood.

== Synopsis ==
"As they travel through the Caribbean, the crew hits the high seas on an epic journey filled with hilarious adventures, emotional breakthroughs, and spicy romances as they cultivate bonds and unapologetically live their best lives."

== Cast ==
- Lil' Kim, a Grammy Award winner and the first woman in hip hop to score three consecutive Billboard "Hot Rap Songs" number-one singles. She's a multi-platinum rapper, actress and fashion icon who remains one of the most influential people in pop culture. Lil' Kim released her fifth studio album, "9," in October 2019.
- Mýa, a Grammy Award-winning international R&B & pop superstar and actress who broke into the mainstream with her platinum self-titled record. In addition to an extensive discography and film resume, Mýa has recently emerged as a leader in vegan lifestyle activism.
- Chilli, a singer-songwriter, dancer and entrepreneur. In addition to being a member of the renowned and Grammy Award-winning musical group, TLC, Chilli is the founder of a nonprofit group, Chilli's Crew, which works with young girls in Atlanta.
- Pretty Vee, a rapper and comedian who stars on Wild 'N Out. She rose to prominence through her viral skits and characters, and has become a popular act in parody.
- B. Simone, a rising comedian who also stars Wild 'N Out
- Tiffany, an actress, model, host, dancer and entrepreneur with a long-standing friendship with Lil' Kim
- Char DeFrancesco, a philanthropist, socialite, former model and entrepreneur

== Episodes ==
No.	Title	Original release date	U.S. viewers (millions)
1	"The Jump Off"	July 15, 2019	1.22
Lil' Kim spares no expense as she sets sail on a multimillion-dollar yacht to an exclusive beachfront area for a luxury vacation with some of her closest friends.
2	"Say My Name, Say My Name"	July 22, 2019	1.02
Lil Kim and her guests jump off the yacht to catch the flavors of Barbados and pay homage to the Queen of the island herself, Rihanna.
3	"Go AWWWFF"	July 29, 2019	0.95
Lil Kim opens up about her past with a friend; B.Simone has her eye on Rakeem; Chilli receives a lunch invitation.
4	"Rock The Boat"	August 5, 2019	0.98
Troubled waters rock the boat during the 17-hour journey to Tobago. Rough seas are ahead, but that doesn't stop Chilli's birthday celebration or B and Dreads from taking their romance to the next level.
5	"It's A Ship-Show"	August 12, 2019	0.85
Cabin fever hits Girls Cruise like a wave on their long way to Tobago; a friendly competition ensues.
6	"Crush on You"	August 19, 2019	0.85
Girls Cruise arrives in Trinidad ready to party; love is in the air as a crew member starts crushing on Kim; competing for the number one spot, Tiffany plans an epic surprise for Queen Bee.
7	"No Time"	September 2, 2019	0.74
It's day 1 of Carnival. There's no rest for the weary when fun director, Rome, plans a non-stop, itinerary for the group. Can they handle partying from dusk til dawn?
8	"Cruisin' Through Carnival"	September 9, 2019	0.70
Day two of Carnival has officially begun. The group gets decked out in their finest costumes and party like never before. B. Simone takes a leap of faith with her relationship with her mom.
9	"The Final Jump Off"	September 16, 2019	0.75
The Girls join together for their last sleepover and tensions rise and fall as they reflect on the sisterhood they developed and enjoy their Final night on the ship to party.
10	"Reunion, Pt. 1"	September 23, 2019	0.66
11	"Reunion, Pt. 2"	September 30, 2019	0.71

== Reception ==
=== Critical ===
Girls Cruise received generally favorable reviews. Writing for Vogue, Christian Allaire commented, "Girls Cruise is our next obsession." Similarly, Glamour called the show "addictive." While The Source noted Girls Cruise as a glamorous vacation of a lifetime." Revolt TV echoed the same sentiment and commented, Girls Cruise is "sure to be epic."

=== Awards and nominations ===
Girls Cruise received two National Film & Television Award (NFTA) nominations for Best Reality Show and Best Entertainment Show. It won Best Entertainment Show. In January 2020, Girls Cruise received a Guild of Music Supervisors Awards nomination for Best Music Supervision In Reality Television.
