= Mackage =

Canadian clothing brand

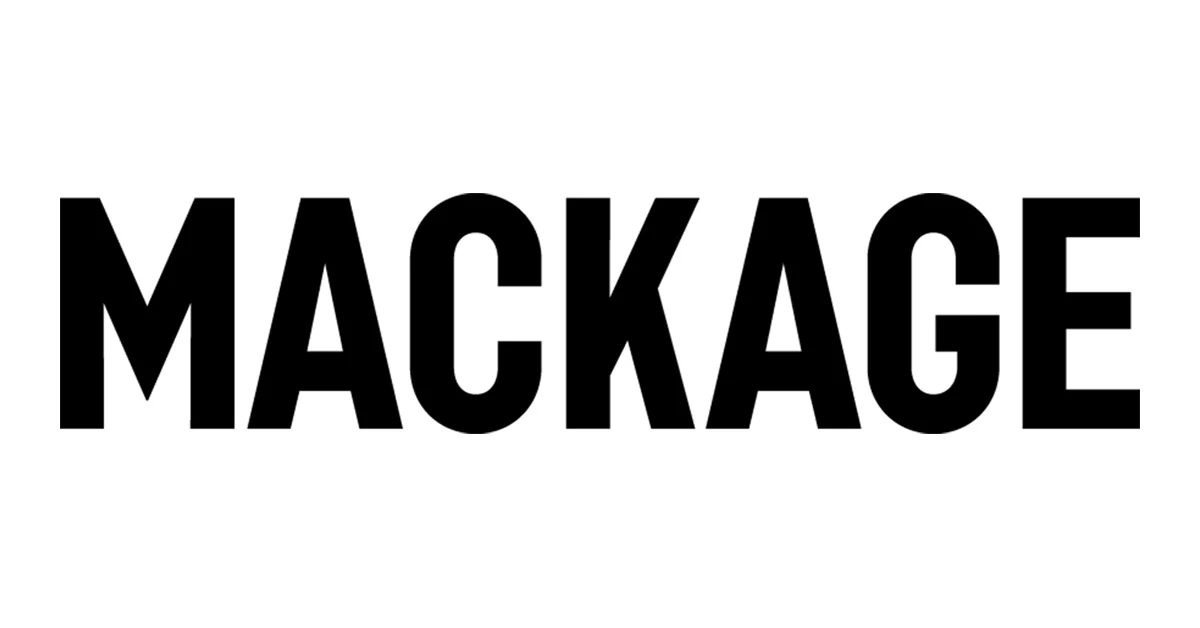

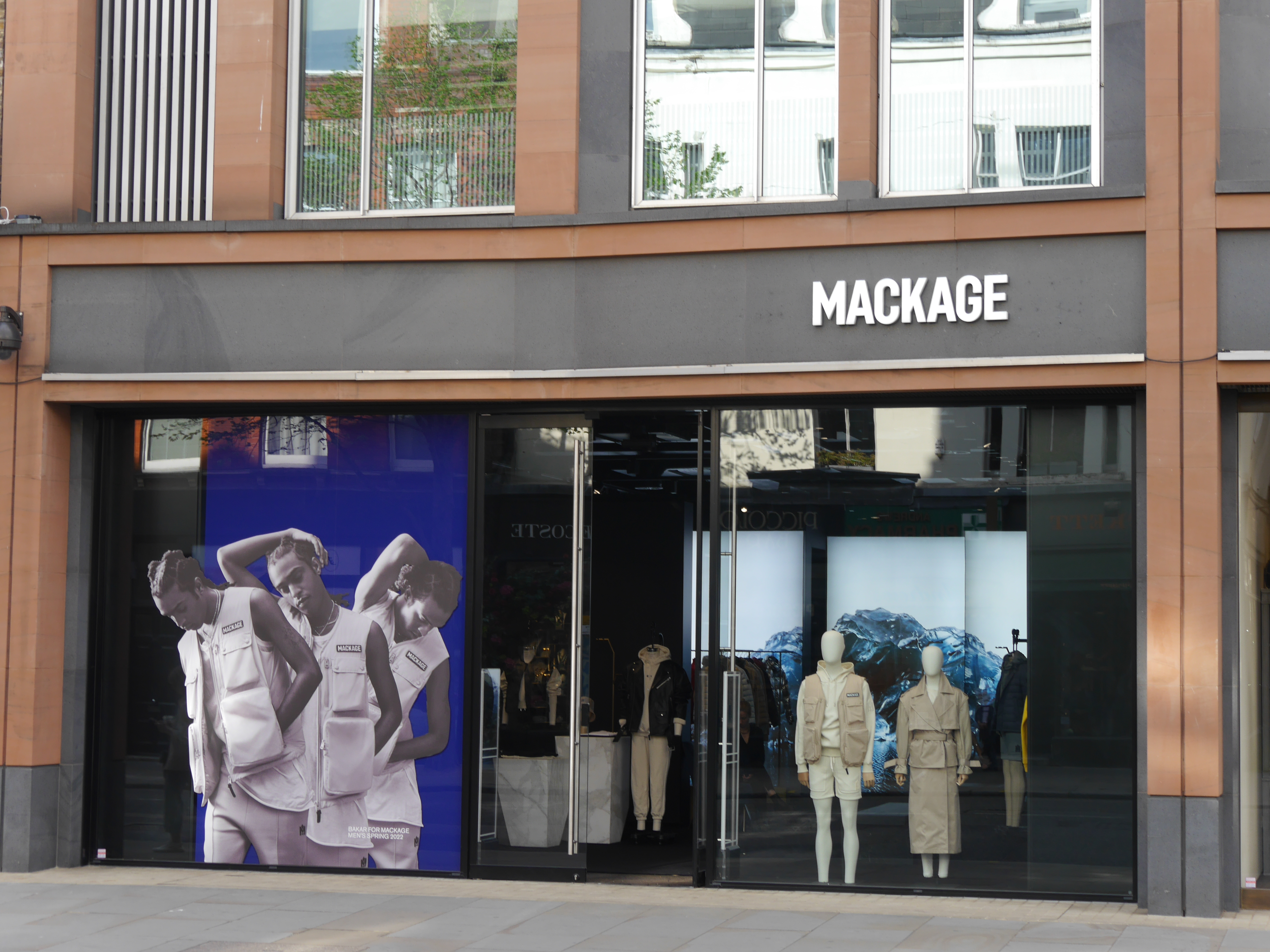
- Mackage store on Sloane Street, London
- Type: Private
- Industry: Fashion
- Founded: 1999; 27 years ago (brand launched commercially in 2000)
- Founders: Eran Elfassy; Elisa Dahan
- Headquarters: Montreal, Quebec, Canada
- Area served: Worldwide
- Key people: Eran Elfassy (Co-founder); Elisa Dahan (Co-founder); Tanya Golešić (CEO)
- Products: Outerwear, leather jackets, wool coats, parkas, ready-to-wear clothing
- Brands: Mackage
- Owner: APP Group Inc.
- Website: www.mackage.com

Mackage is a Canadian luxury outerwear brand established in 1999 by Eran Elfassy. Headquartered in Montreal, it has directly-operated stores in Canada, the US, China, Japan, the Netherlands, and France. Mackage is distributed in more than 40 countries worldwide.

The brand was established in 1999 by designer Eran Elfassy, and Elisa Dahan joined as co-creative director in 2001. Elfassy and Dahan have known each other since elementary school. Elfassy’s background in the leather industry influenced the company's early focus on leather jackets.

Since becoming chief executive officer of Mackage in 2021, Croatian-Canadian executive Tanya Golešić has overseen the company's international expansion and strategic diversification. Prior to joining Mackage, Golešić served as President of the Americas at Jimmy Choo.

== History ==
Elfassy and Dahan met as children while attending elementary school in Montreal and developed an early interest in fashion. Before founding Mackage, the pair collaborated on small design projects, including redesigning sweaters and selling them to friends. Their professional partnership later developed through APP Group Inc., a leather industry company operated by members of the Elfassy family. Eran Elfassy initially joined the company to develop a contemporary leather collection, after which Dahan joined and the two began developing what would become Mackage.

The founders stated that their complementary skills contributed to the company's growth, with the brand expanding from leather jackets into wool outerwear featuring leather detailing and other materials. According to the founders, Mackage was established in response to what they perceived as a lack of fashionable outerwear in the market. They argued that winter coats available at the time were generally oversized and lacked emphasis on silhouette and style.

Elfassy cited international travel as a major source of inspiration, noting that exposure to different cultures and climates influenced seasonal collections. He also stated that the designers regularly reviewed their earlier work to assess the brand's evolution and refine subsequent collections.

=== Retail expansion ===
As part of its international expansion, Mackage opened its flagship retail store in the SoHo neighbourhood of New York City rather than in its home city of Montreal. The founders described opening a flagship store in New York as a long-held ambition, citing the city's international shopping audience and the opportunity presented by the available retail location.

They also highlighted the store's proximity to several established fashion brands, describing the location as strategically important for brand visibility. As Mackage expanded internationally, the company adapted its collections for different climates. Elfassy explained that garments intended for warmer winter regions differed from those designed for colder cities such as Montreal, Toronto, and New York and London.

=== Clientele and campaigns ===
Mackage has been worn by numerous public figures, including Gwyneth Paltrow, Halle Berry, Meghan Markle, Duchess of Sussex, Eva Mendes, and Blake Lively, and made campaigns with Alexander Skarsgård, Stella Maxwell, Matt Bomer, Robert Lewandowski and Croatian Football Federation. The founders stated that celebrity use of the brand often occurred organically rather than through formal endorsement arrangements. Dahan recalled learning that Paltrow had independently purchased a Mackage coat through the online retailer SSENSE, while Elfassy described occasions when stylists requested garments for productions. He also noted his surprise at seeing a Mackage jacket appear in an episode of the television series Suits without prior knowledge.

During CEO's Tanya Golešić's tenure, Mackage expanded into new product categories beyond its traditional outerwear business. In 2025 and 2026, the company introduced its first footwear collection, including the Luka sneaker, named after Croatian footballer Luka Modrić, and launched a capsule collection in collaboration with the Croatian Football Federation ahead of the 2026 FIFA World Cup. The collection featured members of the Croatian men's national football team and reflected the company's emphasis on technical performance and athletic-inspired design.

=== Seasonal collections ===
Although primarily known for autumn and winter outerwear, Mackage also produces spring and summer collections. Dahan stated that designing lightweight seasonal jackets required greater creativity because consumers did not necessarily require outerwear during warmer months. She noted that spring collections generally emphasized lighter materials, brighter colours, and more airy designs, and that some of the brand's best-selling autumn products had originally been introduced in spring collections.

== Future plans ==
The founders stated that Mackage intended to expand into accessories and handbags. They also identified Europe as a key growth market, expressing the goal of achieving a level of brand recognition comparable to that already established in Canada and the United States.

Dahan recalled that, during the company's early expansion into the U.S. market, she and Elfassy played a game they called "spot the coat," celebrating each sighting of a Mackage garment in public. She said they hoped to experience similar recognition in European cities such as Paris as the brand continued its international expansion.
