= Scott Wilson (academic) =

British academic (born 1962)

Scott Wilson (born 1962) is Professor in Media and Cultural Studies in the School of Humanities at Kingston University, London, and member of The London Graduate School.

Wilson completed a PhD at the University of Wales, Cardiff, in 1991.

His research interests include Cultural and Critical Theory, particularly psychoanalysis and the legacy of Georges Bataille.

== Selected bibliography ==
- Wilson, Scott (2008), Great Satan's Rage: American negativity and rap/metal in the age of supercapitalism. Manchester, U.K.: Manchester University Press. 240 pp. ISBN 9780719074639
- Wilson, Scott (2008), The Order of Joy: Beyond the Cultural Politics of Enjoyment. Albany, U.S.: State University of New York Press. 188 pp. (SUNY series in psychoanalysis and culture). ISBN 9780791474495
- Botting, Fred, and Wilson, Scott (2001), Bataille. Basingstoke, U.K.: Palgrave. 232 pp. (Transitions). ISBN 0333914619
- Botting, Fred and Wilson, Scott (2001), The Tarantinian Ethics. London, U.K.: Sage. 186 pp. ISBN 0761968377
