= La Bella Mafia =

Studio album by Lil' Kim
- Released: March 4, 2003
- Recorded: 2002
- Studios: Avatar (New York City); Encore (Burbank, California); The Hit Factory (New York City); Manhattan Center (New York City); Sony Music (New York City); The Source Sound Lab (New York City)
- Genre: Hip-hop
- Length: 63:05
- Labels: Queen Bee; Atlantic
- Producers: Big Hill; Ron Browz; DJ Bless; Ez Elpee; Full Force; Jay "Waxx" Garfield; Havoc; Kimberly "Lil' Kim" Jones; Phantom of the Beats; Sha Money XL; Shaft; Scott Storch; Swizz Beatz; Thorobreads; Timbaland; Kanye West

Lil' Kim chronology
The Notorious K.I.M. (2000)	La Bella Mafia (2003)	The Naked Truth (2005)

Singles from La Bella Mafia
- 1. "The Jump Off" Released: February 28, 2003; 2. "Magic Stick" Released: April 8, 2003; 3. "Thug Luv" Released: October 14, 2003

La Bella Mafia ("The Beautiful Mafia") is the third studio album by the American rapper Lil' Kim. It was released on March 4, 2003, by Queen Bee Entertainment and Atlantic Records. The album debuted at number five on the US Billboard 200, was certified platinum by the Recording Industry Association of America (RIAA) for selling one million copies in the United States.

La Bella Mafia received positive reviews from music critics, marking Kim's lyrical ability as impressive and her presence as formidable. It produced two singles that attained Billboard chart success. The lead single "The Jump Off" peaked at number 17 on the US Billboard Hot 100 and at number 16 on the UK Singles Chart. The second single "Magic Stick", featured 50 Cent, peaked at number two on the Billboard Hot 100. The songs "Magic Stick" and "Came Back for You" earned Kim Grammy Award nominations for Best Rap Performance by a Duo or Group and Best Female Rap Solo Performance, respectively.

== Background ==
In late 2001, Lil' Kim left Junior M.A.F.I.A. and severed ties with all members. She also ended her friendship and business relationship with longtime collaborator Sean "Diddy" Combs.

Recording sessions for La Bella Mafia began in the spring of 2002. In April 2002, Lil' Kim stated in an interview that she had begun working with Dr. Dre in the recording studio. She told MTV, "I've been talking to Dre a lot. And Dre and I are talking about possibly doing some collaborations. He's a cool cat. I love Dre. Our chemistry in the studio was just like, cool. We've been working, you know, trying to cook up some things". Kim also stated that she wanted to work with Eminem, Timbaland, and The Neptunes.

The original title for the album was Hollyhood (which was also set to be the name of her clothing line and to her skit), but it was changed to La Bella Mafia (which in Italian means "The Beautiful Mafia") after Lil' Kim watched the 1997 film of the same name. She stated, "Any girl who's strong and very dedicated to what they do and don't take no mess, they can be a part of La Bella Mafia".

Limited edition collectable cards were included in the first 500,000 US CDs that allowed fans to unlock exclusive content, such as photos and video, from the Internet.

== Singles ==
Altogether La Bella Mafia spawned two international singles and a third US-only single. The lead album's first single, "The Jump Off" peaked at number 17 on the US Billboard Hot 100, becoming Kim's biggest single since her 1997's "Not Tonight (Ladies Night Remix)". It also reached number eight on the Hot R&B/Hip-Hop Songs chart, number seven on the Hot Rap Tracks chart, and number 16 on the UK Singles Chart. The second single, "Magic Stick", featuring 50 Cent, reached number two on the Hot 100, without a music video, and it was not even released as a single. It ended up spending 24 weeks on the chart, becoming Kim's highest-peaking single on that chart. It also reached number two on the Hot R&B/Hip-Hop Songs chart, number seven on the Pop chart and number one on the Hot Rap Songs chart. The song "Thug Luv", featuring Twista, was serviced to US radios only. It reached number 60 on the Hot R&B/Hip-Hop Songs chart and number 14 on the Hot Rap Songs. A CD single was also released in the US.

== Critical reception ==
Professional ratings
Aggregate scores
Source	Rating
Metacritic	65/100
Review scores
Source	Rating
AllMusic	3.5/5 stars
Entertainment Weekly	B
New York Post	3/4 stars
RapReviews.com	8/10
Rolling Stone	3/5 stars
Slant Magazine	3/5 stars
The Source	4.5/5 stars
Spin	8/10
Stylus Magazine	B+
USA Today	3/4 stars

La Bella Mafia received generally positive reviews, as Metacritic reviews scored it at 65 out of 100. Billboard praised La Bella Mafia as a strong showcase of Lil' Kim's growth and talent, highlighting its raw, provocative production and collaborations with artists such as Mr. Cheeks and 50 Cent, and concluding that she had "regained her crown as 'queen bee' of the hip-hop game." AllMusic critic Jason Birchmeier stated her previous album The Notorious K.I.M. was considered a "disappointment" as a follow-up to her debut album Hard Core and La Bella Mafia reestablished her as an "industry icon". Nick Catucci, a critic for Spin Magazine, who gave the album 3 stars claimed, "The King is dead – long live the Queen".

Stylus magazine critic Brett Berliner gave the album a B+ calling the album "one of the top hip-hop albums of 2003" and said, "Kim is now in a class of female MCs that includes only Rah Digga and MC Lyte – and she's more confident, funny, and sexy than any of them". Sal Cinquemani of Slant Magazine gave the album 3 stars stating the album was her "most consistent effort to date," and added the album "plays like one giant bravado about everything: fame, money, power, sex, clothes, rhymes". Critics were also impressed with her lyrical ability. Jon Caramanica of Rolling Stone gave the album 3 stars stating, "When she really gets her hands dirty, Kim sounds more forceful and engaged than she's been in years". However, some critics felt the album was too long and contained too many fillers. Birchmeier of AllMusic stated the album could use a little "trimming". Brett Berliner of Stylus Magazine said, "I enjoy about eight songs on this album, but they're tracks I only feel like listening to from time to time".

== Commercial performance ==
La Bella Mafia debuted at number five on the US Billboard 200 and at number four on the Top R&B/Hip-Hop Albums chart, selling 166,000 copies in its first week. On October 16, 2003, the album received a Platinum certification by the Recording Industry Association of America (RIAA), and had sold 1.1 million copies in the United States by July 2005. Internationally, the album reached number 81 in Switzerland, number 82 in Germany, and number 105 in France. La Bella Mafia had sold over 3 million copies worldwide as of October 2007.

== Track listing ==
No.	Title	Writer(s)	Producer(s)	Length
1.	"Intro"	Sean Combs; James Mtume; Christopher Wallace; Jean-Claude Olivier; Klen Raphael; Hillary Weston	Shaft; Big Hill	1:25
2.	"Hold It Now" (featuring Havoc)	Kimberly Jones; Kejuan Muchita; Adam Horovitz; Darryl McDaniels; Rick Rubin; Joseph Simmons	Havoc	5:25
3.	"Doing It Way Big"	Jones; Jay Garfield	Jay "Waxx" Garfield	4:00
4.	"Can't Fuck with Queen Bee" (featuring Governor and Shelene Thomas with Full Force)	Jones; Coton Greene; Henry Redd; Deniece Williams; Nathan Watts	Full Force	4:58
5.	"Hollyhood Skit"			0:51
6.	"Shake Ya Bum Bum" (featuring Lil' Shanice)	Jones	Garfield	3:18
7.	"This Is Who I Am" (featuring Swizz Beatz and Mashonda)	Jones; Kaseem Dean; Mashonda Tirfrere	Swizz Beatz	3:16
8.	"The Jump Off" (featuring Mr. Cheeks)	Jones; Osten Harvey; Terrance Kelly; Tim Patterson	Timbaland	3:54
9.	"This Is a Warning"	Jones; R. Kelly	Kimberly "Lil' Kim" Jones	3:42
10.	"(When Kim Say) Can You Hear Me Now?" (featuring Missy Elliott)	Jones; Scott Storch	Storch	3:12
11.	"Thug Luv" (featuring Twista)	Jones; Storch; Carl Mitchell	Storch	4:12
12.	"Magic Stick" (featuring 50 Cent)	Jones; Curtis Jackson; Carlos Evans; Michael Clervoix; Rick Ravon; Roy Hawkins	Fantom of the Beat; Sha Money XL	6:00
13.	"Get in Touch with Us" (featuring Styles P)	Jones; Lamont Porter; Kehinde Hassan; Taiwo Hassan	Ez Elpee; Thorobreads	3:47
14.	"Heavenly Father" (featuring Big Hill)	Jones; Raphael; Kenny Gamble; Leon Huff	Shaft	5:07
15.	"Tha Beehive" (featuring Reeks, Bunky S.A., Vee and Saint from The Advakids)	Jones; Ray Evans	DJ Bless	8:07
16.	"Came Back for You"	Jones; Kanye West; Jimmy Webb	West	4:20

Japanese edition bonus track
No.	Title	Writer(s)	Producer(s)	Length
17.	"What's the Word"	Jones; Rondell Turner; Voletta Wallace	Ron Browz	3:03

Notes

- ^{^a} signifies a co-producer.

Sample credits

- "Intro" contains a sample of "Juicy" by The Notorious B.I.G.
- "Hold It Now" contains a sample of "Paul Revere" by Beastie Boys.
- "Can't Fuck with Queen Bee" contains an interpolation of "Free" by Deniece Williams.
- "Shake Ya Bum Bum" contains a sample of the song "Ek Doosre Se Karte Hain Pyaar Hum" from the soundtrack "Hum" by Sudesh Bhosle, Mohammad Aziz, Udit Narayan, Alka Yagnik, and Sonali Vajpayee.
- "The Jump Off" contains an interpolation of "Jeeps, Lex Coups, Bimaz & Benz" by Lost Boyz.
- "This Is a Warning" contains a sample of "A Woman's Threat" by R. Kelly.
- "Magic Stick" contains elements of "The Thrill Is Gone" by B.B. King.
- "Get in Touch with Us" contains a sample of "Zindagi Ban Gaye Ho Tum" by Udit Narayan and Alka Yagnik.
- "Heavenly Father" contains a sample of "A Prayer" by The O'Jays.
- "Came Back for You" contains a sample of "Didn't We" by Irene Reid.

== Personnel ==
- Kimberly "Lil' Kim" Jones – executive producer, styling
- Hillary Weston – associate producer, management
- Jean Nelson – associate producer
- Jamel "Mann" Jackson – project manager
- Joi Brown – project manager
- Greg "Gee" Stewart – assistant engineer
- L. Londell McMillan, P.C. – legal affairs
- David Berdon LLP & Co. – business affairs
- DJ 45 – album sequencing
- Dan "The" Man – album sequencing
- Vincent Soyez – photography, design
- Tre Major – hair
- JJ – makeup
- Derek Lee – styling
- Linda Keil – prop stylist
- MiMi So – jewelry
- David LaChapelle – photography
- Cessy Lima – hair
- Scott Barnes – makeup
- Andrea Leiberman – styling
- Diamond Quasar – jewelry
- Lynn Kowalewski – art direction
- Kevin Wolahan – design

== Charts ==
=== Weekly charts ===
Weekly chart performance for La Bella Mafia
Chart (2003)	Peak position
Australian Hitseekers (ARIA)	10
Australian Urban Albums (ARIA)	24
Canadian Albums (Nielsen SoundScan)	47
Canadian R&B Albums (Nielsen SoundScan)	11
French Albums (SNEP)	105
German Albums (Offizielle Top 100)	82
Japanese Albums (Oricon)	33
Swiss Albums (Schweizer Hitparade)	81
UK Albums (Official Charts)	80
UK R&B Albums (Official Charts)	13
US Billboard 200	5
US Top R&B/Hip-Hop Albums (Billboard)	4

=== Year-end charts ===
Year-end chart performance for La Bella Mafia
Chart (2003)	Position
US Billboard 200	68
US Top R&B/Hip-Hop Albums (Billboard)	24

== Certifications ==
Certifications for La Bella Mafia
Region	Certification	Certified units/sales
United States (RIAA)	Platinum	1,100,000
