= Magic Stick =

2003 single by Lil' Kim

Single by Lil' Kim featuring 50 Cent

from the album La Bella Mafia
- Released: April 2003
- Length: 6:00 (album version); 3:31 (radio edit)
- Label: Atlantic; Queen Bee; BIG Entertainment
- Songwriters: Kimberly Jones; Curtis Jackson III
- Producer: Carlos "Phantom of the Beat" Evans

Lil' Kim singles chronology
"Ten Commandments" (2003)	"Magic Stick" (2003)	"Can't Hold Us Down" (2003)

50 Cent singles chronology
"21 Questions" (2003)	"Magic Stick" (2003)	"P.I.M.P." (2003)

Audio
- "Magic Stick" on YouTube

"Magic Stick" is a song by American rapper Lil' Kim featuring fellow American rapper 50 Cent, released in April 2003 as the second single from her third studio album, La Bella Mafia (2003). The song was produced by Carlos "Fantom of the Beat" Evans. Despite not having a physical release or music video, the song was a radio hit, peaking at number two on the US Billboard Hot 100 and number 47 in New Zealand.

== Background ==
The song samples "It Be's That Way Sometimes" by Joe Simon. The song was originally intended for 50 Cent's album Get Rich or Die Tryin' and featured rapper Trina. After Trina sent her verse back to 50 Cent, he decided that she wasn't suited well for the song. 50 Cent then sent the song to Lil' Kim, who failed to send the song back to 50 Cent before the deadline for his record, so he let her use it for her album La Bella Mafia. A sequel to "Magic Stick", titled "Wanna Lick (Magic Stick, Pt. 2)", was recorded by the pair and released on Lil' Kim's 2008 mixtape Ms. G.O.A.T.

== Chart performance ==
The song debuted at number 75 on the Billboard Hot 100 on April 26, 2003, then peaked at number two on July 12. A video was scheduled to be shot, but problems between Lil' Kim and 50 Cent caused the shoot to be canceled. The song spent a total of 24 weeks on the Hot 100. The song charted as Kim's second-highest single (as a lead artist), and her second-highest overall, after 2001's "Lady Marmalade" with Mya, Pink, and Christina Aguilera. It also became 50 Cent's second overall top-10 and top-three single. Elsewhere, the song charted in New Zealand, reaching number 47 on the RIANZ Singles Chart and receiving a platinum certification from Recorded Music NZ in 2026, denoting sales and streaming units exceeding 30,000.

== Live performance ==
Lil' Kim performed the song in 2011 at the latter's show in Australia. She also performed this song in 2003 on The BET Awards main stage.

== Charts ==
=== Weekly charts ===
Weekly chart performance for "Magic Stick"
Chart (2003)	Peak position
New Zealand (Recorded Music NZ)	47
US Billboard Hot 100	2
US Hot R&B/Hip-Hop Songs (Billboard)	2
US Hot Rap Songs (Billboard)	1
US Pop Airplay (Billboard)	7
US Rhythmic Airplay (Billboard)	1

=== Year-end charts ===
Year-end chart performance for "Magic Stick"
Chart (2003)	Position
US Billboard Hot 100	20
US Hot R&B/Hip-Hop Singles & Tracks (Billboard)	18
US Hot Rap Tracks (Billboard)	9
US Mainstream Top 40 (Billboard)	47
US Rhythmic Top 40 (Billboard)	6

== Certifications ==
Certifications for "Magic Stick"
Region	Certification	Certified units/sales
New Zealand (RMNZ)	Platinum	30,000^{‡}
^{‡} Sales+streaming figures based on certification alone.
