= The Jump Off =

Single by Lil' Kim featuring Mr. Cheeks

from the album La Bella Mafia
- Released: February 10, 2003
- Recorded: 2002
- Studio: Manhattan Center Studios (New York City, New York)
- Genre: Hip hop
- Length: 3:53
- Label: Atlantic; Queen Bee
- Songwriters: K. Jones; T. Mosley
- Producer: Timbaland

Lil' Kim singles chronology
"Kimnotyze" (2002)	"The Jump Off" (2003)	"Ten Commandments" (2003)

"The Jump Off" is a song by American rapper Lil' Kim featuring fellow American rappers Mr. Cheeks and Timbaland, who produced the track. It was released by Atlantic Records on February 10, 2003 as the lead single from her third studio album La Bella Mafia (2003).

== Background ==
"The Jump Off" means something that gets the party going and is also slang for "the best". The chorus of the song interpolates the Lost Boyz's 1995 song "Jeeps, Lex Coups, Bimaz & Benz". Kim decided to incorporate the song for the hook because it was one of her favorite songs during that time and felt it fit the storyline, despite producer Timbaland saying she should do something else.

== Music video ==
The music video for the song was filmed at "Capitale" in New York City. It was directed by Benny Boom.

== Track listings ==
- US remix promo CD
1. "The Jump Off (Remix)" (Clean) – 4:26
2. "The Jump Off (Remix)" (Dirty) – 4:26
3. "The Jump Off (Remix)" (Acapella) – 4:26
- US promo CD
1. "The Jump Off" (Clean) – 3:54
2. "The Jump Off" (Instrumental) – 3:58
3. "The Jump Off" (Album Version) – 3:58
- German promo CD
1. "The Jump Off" (7Gemini Remix) – 3:50
2. "The Jump Off" (Original Remix) – 3:53
3. "The Jump Off" (Tomekk Remix) – 4:10
4. "The Jump Off" (Nappy Doggout Remix) – 3:59
- UK promo CD
1. "The Jump Off" (Clean Version) – 3:55
2. "The Jump Off" (Dirty Version) – 3:55
- Maxi CD
1. "The Jump Off" (Original Remix) – 3:54
2. "The Jump Off" (Tomekk Remix) – 4:10
3. "The Jump Off" (7Gemini Remix) – 3:50
4. "The Jump Off" (Nappy Doggout Remix) – 3:59
5. Enhanced Video

== Charts ==
=== Weekly charts ===
Chart (2003)	Peak position
Australia (ARIA)	59
Australian Urban (ARIA)	19
Belgium (Ultratop 50 Flanders)	27
Europe (European Hot 100 Singles)	54
Germany (GfK)	78
Italy (FIMI)	20
Netherlands (Dutch Top 40 Tipparade)	7
Netherlands (Single Top 100)	83
Scotland Singles (OCC)	34
UK Singles (OCC)	16
UK Hip Hop/R&B (OCC)	6
US Billboard Hot 100	17
US Hot R&B/Hip-Hop Songs (Billboard)	8
US Hot Rap Songs (Billboard)	7
US Rhythmic Airplay (Billboard)	8

=== Year-end charts ===
Chart (2003)	Peak position
UK Urban (Music Week)	22
US Billboard Hot 100	72
US Billboard Hot R&B/Hip-Hop Singles	36
US Billboard Hot R&B/Hip-Hop Singles Sales	23
US Billboard Hot R&B/Hip-Hop Airplay	36

== Other versions ==
A remix featuring Mobb Deep was also released but was used as a promotional single. The remix retained the same beat as the original, as well as Mr. Cheeks with background vocals, but featured new verses from Kim as well as Mobb Deep. There is also an unofficial remix to this song which features T.I.

For her 2007 mixtape Playtime Is Over, Nicki Minaj made a cover of the song and renamed it "Jump Off '07".

== Release history ==
Release dates and format(s) for "The Jump Off"
Region	Date	Format(s)	Label(s)	Ref.
United States	February 10, 2003	Rhythmic contemporary; Urban radio	Atlantic; Queen Bee	
