= Lil' Kim discography =

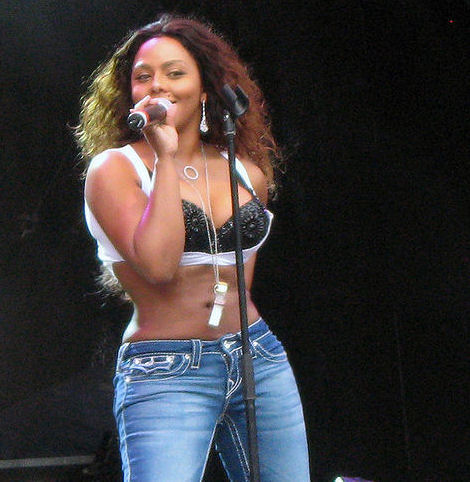
- Lil' Kim performing in 2008
- Studio albums: 5
- Singles: 36
- Compilation albums: 1
- Remix albums: 1
- Mixtapes: 4
- Promotional singles: 13

American rapper Lil' Kim has released five studio albums, one compilation album, one remix album, four mixtapes, forty-two singles (including twenty-five as a featured artist), and thirteen promotional singles. In 1994, Kim was a member of the hip hop group Junior M.A.F.I.A. Their first album, Conspiracy, was released in August 1995, and has been certified gold by the Recording Industry Association of America (RIAA). It spawned the gold and platinum-certified top-twenty singles, "Player's Anthem", "Get Money", and "I Need You Tonight".

Originally signed to Big Beat Records, an Atlantic subsidiary, Kim's debut studio album, Hard Core, was released in November 1996, and sold two million copies in the United States. It produced three singles, of which two were certified gold and platinum by the RIAA. Her second album The Notorious K.I.M. was released in June 2000. It spawned two singles, "No Matter What They Say" and "How Many Licks?". In 2001, Kim collaborated alongside Christina Aguilera, Mýa, and Pink on the Grammy Award-winning number-one song "Lady Marmalade", a cover version recorded for the soundtrack of the film Moulin Rouge! (2001).

After a musical hiatus, Kim released La Bella Mafia in 2003. Its spawned two singles "The Jump Off" and "Magic Stick". Her fourth studio album, The Naked Truth, released in 2005, reach number six in the US. It spawned the singles "Lighters Up", which reached the top forty in the United States, and "Whoa".

== Albums ==
=== Studio albums ===
List of studio albums, with selected chart positions, sales figures and certifications
Title	Details	Peak chart positions										Sales	Certifications
Title	Details	US	US R&B /HH	US Rap	CAN	FRA	GER	JPN	NLD	SWI	UK	Sales	Certifications
Hard Core	Released: November 12, 1996; Label: Undeas, Big Beat, Atlantic; Formats: CD, LP, cassette, digital download, streaming	11	3	—	62	—	—	—	—	—	116	WW: 5,000,000 (Note: Worldwide sales figure for Hard Core as of 2016.); US: 1,500,000	RIAA: 2× Platinum
The Notorious K.I.M.	Released: June 27, 2000; Label: Queen Bee, Undeas, Atlantic; Formats: CD, LP, cassette, digital download, streaming	4	1	—	11	70	76	—	85	100	67	WW: 5,100,000 (Note: Worldwide sales figure for The Notorious K.I.M. as of 2016.); US: 1,416,000 (Note: US sales figure for The Notorious K.I.M. as of 2007.)	RIAA: Platinum; MC: Gold
La Bella Mafia	Released: March 4, 2003; Label: Queen Bee, Atlantic; Formats: CD, LP, cassette, digital download, streaming	5	4	—	47	105	82	33	—	81	80	WW: 2,020,558 (Note: Worldwide sales figure for La Bella Mafia as of 2007.); US: 1,100,000 (Note: US sales figure for La Bella Mafia as of 2005.)	RIAA: Platinum
The Naked Truth	Released: September 27, 2005; Label: Queen Bee, Atlantic; Formats: CD, LP, digital download	6	3	2	—	—	—	46	—	—	—	WW: 2,700,000 (Note: Worldwide sales figure for The Naked Truth as of 2017.); US: 394,000 (Note: US sales figure for The Naked Truth as of 2008.)	
9	Released: October 11, 2019; Label: Queen Bee, eOne Music; Formats: CD, LP, digital download, streaming	— (Note: 9 did not enter the Billboard 200, but peaked at number 13 on the Digital Albums chart.)	— (Note: 9 did not enter the Top R&B/Hip-Hop Albums chart, but peaked at number seven on the R&B/Hip-Hop Album Sales chart.)	—	—	—	—	—	—	—	— (Note: 9 did not enter the UK Albums Chart, but peaked at number 70 on the UK Album Downloads Chart.)		
"—" denotes a recording that did not chart or was not released in that territory.

=== Compilation albums ===
Title	Details
Now Playing	Released: June 20, 2024; Label: Rhino; Format: Vinyl

=== Remix albums ===
Title	Details
Dance Remixes	Released: June 6, 2006; Label: Atlantic, Queen Bee; Format: CD

=== Mixtapes ===
Title	Details
Ms. G.O.A.T.	Released: June 3, 2008; Label: Money Maker; Formats: CD, digital download
Black Friday	Released: February 14, 2011; Label: IRS; Formats: CD via PayPal
Hard Core 2K14	Released: September 11, 2014; Label: Grimey Records; Format: Digital download
Lil Kim Season	Released: March 28, 2016; Label: IRS; Format: Digital download

== Singles ==
=== As lead artist ===
List of singles as lead artist, with selected chart positions, showing year released and album name
Title	Year	Peak chart positions										Certifications	Album
Title	Year	US	US R&B /HH	US Rap	AUS	FRA	GER	NLD	NZ	SWI	UK	Certifications	Album
"No Time" (featuring Puff Daddy)	1996	18	9	1	—	—	—	—	—	—	45	RIAA: Gold	Hard Core
"Crush on You" (featuring The Notorious B.I.G. and Lil Cease)	1997	—	—	—	—	—	—	—	—	—	23	RIAA: Platinum	Hard Core
"Not Tonight (Ladies' Night Remix)" (featuring Da Brat, Left Eye, Missy "Misdeameanor" Elliott and Angie Martinez)	1997	6	3	2	—	—	99	31	4	—	11	RIAA: Platinum; RMNZ: Gold	Hard Core / Nothing to Lose (soundtrack)
"Call Me" (with Too Short)	1997	90	30	39	—	—	—	—	—	—	—		Booty Call (soundtrack)
"No Matter What They Say"	2000	60	15	6	—	—	—	—	—	—	35		The Notorious K.I.M.
"How Many Licks?" (featuring Sisqó)	2000	75	36	11	57	—	58	6	—	—	—		The Notorious K.I.M.
"Lady Marmalade" (with Christina Aguilera, Mýa and Pink)	2001	1	1	—	1	12	1	2	1	1	1	RIAA: Platinum; ARIA: 2× Platinum; BPI: 2× Platinum; BVMI: Platinum; IFPI SWI: Gold; NVPI: Platinum; RMNZ: 2× Platinum; SNEP: Gold	Moulin Rouge! (soundtrack)
"In the Air Tonite" (featuring Phil Collins)	2001	—	—	—	91	—	3	30	—	11	26	BVMI: Gold	Urban Renewal
"The Jump Off" (featuring Mr. Cheeks)	2003	17	8	7	59	—	78	83	—	—	16		La Bella Mafia
"Magic Stick" (featuring 50 Cent)	2003	2	2	1	—	—	—	—	47	—	—	RMNZ: Platinum	La Bella Mafia
"Thug Luv" (featuring Twista)	2003	—	60	14	—	—	—	—	—	—	—		La Bella Mafia
"Lighters Up"	2005	31	9	8	—	—	67	—	—	—	12		The Naked Truth
"Whoa"	2006	—	30	—	—	—	—	—	—	—	43		The Naked Truth
"Download" (featuring T-Pain and Charlie Wilson)	2009	—	21	15	—	—	—	—	—	—	—		Non-album singles
"Nasty One"	2018	—	—	—	—	—	—	—	—	—	—		Non-album singles
"Go Awff"	2019	—	—	—	—	—	—	—	—	—	—		9
"Found You" (featuring City Girls and O.T. Genasis)	2019	—	—	—	—	—	—	—	—	—	—		9
"Love for Ya" (with Tayy Brown)	2024	—	—	—	—	—	—	—	—	—	—		Non-album single
"—" denotes a recording that did not chart or was not released in that territory.

=== As featured artist ===
List of singles as featured artist, with selected chart positions and certifications, showing year released and album name
Title	Year	Peak chart positions										Certifications	Album
Title	Year	US	US R&B /HH	US Rap	AUS	FRA	GER	NLD	NZ	SWI	UK	Certifications	Album
"No More Games" (Skin Deep featuring Lil' Kim of Junior M.A.F.I.A.)	1996	92	39	—	—	—	—	—	—	—	—		Get U Open
"It's All About the Benjamins" (Puff Daddy featuring Lil' Kim, The Lox and The Notorious B.I.G.)	1997	2	7	1	—	—	—	25	—	—	18		No Way Out
"I Can Love You" (Mary J. Blige featuring Lil' Kim)	1997	28	2	—	—	—	—	—	—	—	—		Share My World
"Hit Em wit da Hee" (Missy "Misdeameanor" Elliott featuring Lil' Kim and Mocha)	1998	—	61	—	—	—	63	—	27	—	24		Supa Dupa Fly
"Money, Power & Respect" (The Lox featuring Lil' Kim and DMX)	1998	17	8	1	—	—	—	—	—	—	—	RIAA: Gold	Money, Power & Respect
"Quiet Storm (Remix)" (Mobb Deep featuring Lil' Kim)	1999	— (Note: "Quiet Storm (Remix)" did not enter the Billboard Hot 100, but peaked at number six on the Bubbling Under Hot 100 Singles chart.)	35	17	—	—	—	—	—	—	—		Murda Muzik
"Play Around" (Lil' Cease featuring Lil' Kim, Joe Hooker and Mr. Bristol)	1999	—	52	9	—	—	—	—	—	—	—		Wonderful World of Cease
"Get Naked" (Methods of Mayhem featuring Fred Durst, George Clinton, Lil' Kim and Mix Master Mike)	1999	—	—	—	—	—	—	64	—	—	—		Methods of Mayhem
"Notorious B.I.G." (Notorious B.I.G. featuring Puff Daddy and Lil' Kim)	1999	82	30	—	—	95	56	78	—	68	16	RMNZ: Gold	Born Again
"Espacio" (Black Rob featuring Lil' Kim and G. Dep)	2000	—	— (Note: "Espacio" did not enter the Hot R&B/Hip-Hop Songs chart, but peaked at number one on the Bubbling Under R&B/Hip-Hop Singles chart.)	—	—	—	—	—	—	—	—		Life Story
"Wait a Minute" (Ray J featuring Lil' Kim)	2001	30	8	—	—	—	72	75	—	80	54		This Ain't a Game
"What's Going On" (as part of Artists Against AIDS Worldwide)	2001	27	76	—	38	—	—	26	—	—	6		What's Going On: All-Star Tribute
"Kimnotyze" (DJ Tomekk featuring Lil' Kim)	2002	—	—	—	—	—	6	—	—	43	—		Beat of Life Vol. 1
"Fresh From Yard" (Beenie Man featuring Lil' Kim)	2002	—	85	21	—	—	—	—	—	—	—		Tropical Storm
"Can't Hold Us Down" (Christina Aguilera featuring Lil' Kim)	2003	12	—	—	9	27	5	14	2	11	6	ARIA: Gold; BPI: Silver	Stripped
"Get Down on It" (Kool & the Gang and Blue featuring Lil' Kim)	2004	20	—	—	3	—	—	96	—	35	29		The Hits: Reloaded and Best of Blue
"Sugar (Gimme Some)" (Trick Daddy featuring Lil' Kim and Cee-Lo)	2005	20	36	12	31	—	—	—	—	—	61	RIAA: Gold	Thug Matrimony: Married to the Streets
"Let It Go" (Keyshia Cole featuring Missy Elliott and Lil' Kim)	2007	7	1	—	—	—	72	—	—	—	—	RIAA: Platinum	Just like You
"Girls" (Seven featuring Lil' Kim)	2009	—	—	—	—	—	—	—	—	—	—		Non-album singles
"Standing on Couches" (DJ Self featuring Jim Jones, Lil' Kim, Kyah Baby and Lloyd Banks)	2010	—	— (Note: "Standing on Couches" did not enter the Hot R&B/Hip-Hop Songs chart, but peaked at number 11 on the Bubbling Under R&B/Hip-Hop Singles chart.)	—	—	—	—	—	—	—	—		Non-album singles
"1Hunnit" (Young Goldie featuring Lil' Kim)	2013	—	—	—	—	—	—	—	—	—	—		Non-album singles
"I Did It for Brooklyn" (Maino featuring Lil' Kim)	2016	—	—	—	—	—	—	—	—	—	—		Lil Kim Season
"I Got a Feeling" (D-Roc featuring Lil' Kim and Zoey Dollaz)	2016	—	—	—	—	—	—	—	—	—	—		Non-album singles
"I'm Better (Remix)" (Missy Elliott featuring Eve, Lil' Kim and Trina)	2017	—	—	—	—	—	—	—	—	—	—		Non-album singles
"Wake Me Up" (Remy Ma featuring Lil' Kim)	2017	—	—	—	—	—	—	—	—	—	—		Non-album singles
"Curious (Remix)" (Eric Bellinger featuring Lil' Kim and Lola Brooke)	2023	—	—	—	—	—	—	—	—	—	—		Non-album singles
"—" denotes a recording that did not chart or was not released in that territory.

=== Promotional singles ===
List of promotional singles, with selected chart positions, showing year released and album name
Title	Year	Peak chart positions	Album
Title	Year	US R&B /HH	Album
"Suck My Dick"	2000	—	The Notorious K.I.M.
"What's the Word"	2002	— (Note: "What's the Word" did not enter the Hot R&B/Hip-Hop Songs chart, but peaked at number nine on the Bubbling Under R&B/Hip-Hop Singles chart.)	La Bella Mafia
"Shut Up Bitch"	2005	72	The Naked Truth
"Spell Check"	2005	—	The Naked Truth
"I Am Not the One"	2011	—	Non-album promotional singles
"If You Love Me"	2012	—	Non-album promotional singles
"Keys to the City"	2012	—	Non-album promotional singles
"Looks Like Money"	2013	—	Non-album promotional singles
"Haterz" (featuring B. Ford)	2014	—	Hard Core 2K14
"#Mine" (featuring Kevin Gates)	2016	—	Lil Kim Season
"Took Us a Break"	2017	—	Non-album promotional singles
"Spicy"	2018	—	Non-album promotional singles
"Nasty One (Remix)" (featuring Kranium, HoodCelebrityy, and Stefflon Don)	2018	—	Non-album promotional singles
"Left Eye (Remix)" {with Honey Bxby)	2025	—	Non-album promotional singles
"—" denotes a recording that did not chart or was not released in that territory.

== Other charted songs ==
List of other charted songs, with selected chart positions, showing year released and album name
Title	Year	Peak chart positions		Album
Title	Year	US	US R&B /HH	Album
"Would You Die for Me" (The Notorious B.I.G. featuring Lil' Kim and Puff Daddy)	1999	—	— (Note: "Would You Die for Me" did not enter the Hot R&B/Hip-Hop Songs chart, but peaked at number six on the Bubbling Under R&B/Hip-Hop Singles chart.)	Born Again
"Hold On" (featuring Mary J. Blige)	2000	—	— (Note: "Hold On" did not enter the Hot R&B/Hip-Hop Songs chart, but peaked at number two on the Bubbling Under R&B/Hip-Hop Singles chart.)	The Notorious K.I.M.
"Shake Ya Body" (R. Kelly and Jay-Z featuring Lil' Kim)	2002	72	66	The Best of Both Worlds
"Ten Commandments" (Lil' Mo featuring Lil' Kim)	2003	—	— (Note: "Ten Commandments" did not enter the Hot R&B/Hip-Hop Songs chart, but peaked at number one on the Bubbling Under R&B/Hip-Hop Singles chart.)	Meet the Girl Next Door
"Shake Ya Bum Bum" (featuring Lil' Shanice)	2003	—	— (Note: "Shake Ya Bum Bum" did not enter the Hot R&B/Hip-Hop Songs chart, but peaked at number 16 on the Bubbling Under R&B/Hip-Hop Singles chart.)	La Bella Mafia
"(When Kim Say) Can You Hear Me Now?" (featuring Missy Elliott)	2003	—	— (Note: "(When Kim Say) Can You Hear Me Now?" did not enter the Hot R&B/Hip-Hop Songs chart, but peaked at number one on the Bubbling Under R&B/Hip-Hop Singles chart.)	La Bella Mafia
"Do That Thing" (B2K featuring Lil' Kim)	2004	63	39	You Got Served
"Do the Damn Thing" (Rupee featuring Lil' Kim)	2005	—	86	Non-album song
"Hey Ho" (Ludacris featuring Lil' Kim and Lil' Fate)	2010	— (Note: "Hey Ho" did not enter the Billboard Hot 100, but peaked at number eight on the Bubbling Under Hot 100 Singles chart.)	—	Battle of the Sexes
"—" denotes a recording that did not chart or was not released in that territory.

== Guest appearances ==
List of non-single album appearances, with other performing artists, showing year released and album name
Title	Year	Other artist(s)	Album
"Intro" (uncredited)	1994	The Notorious B.I.G.	Ready to Die
"F*** Me" (uncredited)	1994	The Notorious B.I.G.	Ready to Die
"Friend of Mine" (uncredited)	1994	The Notorious B.I.G.	Ready to Die
"No One Else" (Puff Daddy Remix)	1996	Total, Foxy Brown, Da Brat, Puff Daddy	Total
"Don't Stop What You're Doing"	1997	Puff Daddy	No Way Out
"Freestyle"	1997	None	The Mix Tape, Vol. II
"Will They Die 4 You"	1997	Mase, Puff Daddy	Harlem World
"Just Like Me"	1997	Usher	My Way
"Give It Up"	1997	SWV	Release Some Tension
"I Know What Girls Like"	1997	Jay-Z, Puff Daddy	In My Lifetime, Vol. 1
"Another"	1997	The Notorious B.I.G.	Life After Death
"The Only One"	1998	112	Room 112
"You Get Dealt Wit"	1998	Jermaine Dupri, Mase	Life in 1472
"Checkin' for You"	1999	Missy Elliott	Da Real World
"Throw Your Hands Up (Interlude)"	1999	Missy Elliott	Da Real World
"Da Butta"	1999	Will Smith	Willennium
"K.I.M."	1999	None	The Tunnel
"Would You Die for Me?"	1999	The Notorious B.I.G., Puff Daddy	Born Again
"What You Want"	1999	Puff Daddy	Forever
"Gangsta Shit"	1999	Puff Daddy, Mark Curry	Forever
"Real Niggas"	1999	Puff Daddy, Notorious B.I.G.	Forever
"Journey Through the Life"	1999	Puff Daddy, Joe Hooker, Beanie Sigel, Nas	Forever
"Rockin'"	2000	None	The Mix Tape, Vol. IV
"Get Fucked Up" (Remix)	2000	Iconz	Street Money Vol. 1
"Freak Freak"	2001	The Product G&B	Ghetto Blues
"Fresh from Yard"	2002	Beenie Man	Tropical Storm
"Shake Ya Body"	2002	Jay-Z, R. Kelly	Best of Both Worlds
"Notorious B.I.G." (Remix)	2002	P. Diddy, The Notorious B.I.G.	We Invented the Remix
"10 Commandments"	2002	Lil' Mo	Meet the Girl Next Door
"I Need That (I Want That)"	2002	3LW	A Girl Can Mack
"Impatient"	2002	Blu Cantrell	Bittersweet
"Gone Delirious"	2002	Swizz Beatz	Swizz Beatz Presents G.H.E.T.T.O. Stories
"Body Kiss"	2003	The Isley Brothers	Body Kiss
"Rock the Party" (Young Heff Remix)	2003	Benzino, Petey Pablo, Mario Winans	Redemption
"Get Ya Shit Together"	2004	T.I.	Urban Legend
"Naughty Girl" (Remix)	2004	Beyoncé	Live at Wembley
"Do Wrong"	2005	Twista	The Day After
"Stomp"	2006	Maino	King of the City
"Get Touched"	2006	None	Touch the Sky
"Notorious B.I.G."	2007	Notorious B.I.G., Puff Daddy	Greatest Hits
"Brooklyn 4 Life"	2008	Maino, Papoose	The One and Only!
"Where You At" (uncredited)	2008	Ray J, Game	All I Feel
"Get Up on It"	2008	Mams Taylor, Game	King Amongst Men: The Lost Album
"New Jack City Bitch"	2008	Uncle Murda	Back on My Bullshit
"Get Money Bitchez"	2008	Shawty Lo	I'm da Man 2K9
"5 Boroughs"	2008	LL Cool J, KRS-One, Method Man, Jim Jones	Exit 13
"Cover Girl"	2008	Jamie Foxx	Intuition
"Porn Star"	2009	Fat Joe	Jealous Ones Still Envy 2 (J.O.S.E. 2)
"Grindin Makin Money"	2009	Birdman, Nicki Minaj	Priceless
"Gangsta Girl"	2009	Wyclef Jean	From the Hut, To the Projects, To the Mansion
"Hey Ho"	2010	Ludacris, Lil' Fate	Battle of the Sexes
"Knock Off"	2011	Angelica Salem	Voice of an Angel
"OD"	2011	Mook, Ron Browz	401k
"Unstoppable"	2011	Yolanda Renee	Girl From The Hood
"Everywhere We Go"	2011	D-Dot, Nicki Minaj	It's About to Be Crazy, Vol. 2
"I Go"	2012	Fred the Godson	Gordo Frederico
"Number One Man"	2012	Joi Rocks	All or Nothing
"Jay-Z"	2012	Tiffany Foxx	Yellow Tape
"Red Diamonds"	2013	Phendi	Label Whore
"Auction"	2015	Puff Daddy, King Los, Styles P	MMM (Money Making Mitch)
"Still Rich"	2016	Berner, Wiz Khalifa	Hempire
"Lovin' You for Life"	2017	Faith Evans	The King & I
"Funeral"	2018	DreamDoll	Life in Plastic 2
"Bitches"	2018	Tiffany Foxx	Bad Bitch Commandments
"Put Dat Pressure on Em"	2019	Big Lew	Xerxes

== Soundtrack appearances ==
List of soundtrack appearances, with other performing artists, showing year released and album name
Title	Year	Other artist(s)	Album
"Time to Shine"	1996	Mona Lisa	Don't Be a Menace to South Central While Drinking Your Juice in the Hood
"Queen Bitch"	1996	None	High School High
"Money Talks"	1997	Andrea Martin	Money Talks
"Back in You Again"	1997	Rick James, Lil' Cease	Money Talks
"Call Me"	1997	Too Short	Booty Call
"Not Tonight"	1997	Lisa "Left Eye" Lopes, Da Brat, Missy Elliott, Angie Martinez	Nothing to Lose
"Don't Stop What You're Doing"	1997	Puff Daddy	Soul Food
"Hit 'Em wit Da Hee" (Remix)	1998	Missy Elliott, Mocha	Can't Hardly Wait
"Quiet Storm" (Remix)	1999	Mobb Deep	In Too Deep
"Will They Die 4 You"	1999	Mase, Puffy & System of a Down	Chef Aid: The South Park Album
"Do U Wanna Roll (Dolittle Theme)"	2001	R.L., Snoop Dogg	Dr. Dolittle 2
"Lady Marmalade"	2001	Christina Aguilera, Pink & Mýa	Moulin Rouge!
"Cell Block Tango (He Had It Comin')"	2002	Queen Latifah, Macy Gray	Chicago
"It's All About the Benjamins"	2002	Puff Daddy, The Notorious B.I.G., The Lox	All About the Benjamins
"Time to Rock & Roll"	2002	None	WWE Anthology
"Do That Thing"	2003	B2K	You Got Served
"The Jump Off" (Remix)	2003	Mobb Deep, Mr. Cheeks	Grind
"Get Naked"	2004	Methods of Mayhem, Fred Durst	The Girl Next Door
"Notorious B.I.G."	2009	The Notorious B.I.G., Puff Daddy	Notorious
"Big Santa Papi"	2021	None	Miracles Across 125th Street

== Other appearances ==
Title	Year	Other artist(s)	Album
"Funny How Time Flies" (Remix)	1995	Intro	Non-album appearance
"Floatin on Your Love" ('Float On' Bad Boy Remix)	1996	The Isley Brothers, Angela Winbush, 112	Non-album appearance
"24 Hrs. to Live" (Remix)	1998	Foxy Brown, Missy Elliott, Queen Pen	Non-album appearance
"Satisfy You" (Remix)	2000	Puff Daddy, Mario Winans	Non-album appearance
"How Many Licks" (Neptunes Remix)	2000	Lil' Cease, Snoop Dogg, Kelis, Pharrell Williams	Non-album appearance
"Pussycat" (Remix)	2002	Missy Elliott, Janet Jackson	Non-album appearance
"Lighters Up" (Tego Mix)	2006	Tego Calderón	Non-album appearance
"Gimme More" (The Kimme More Remix)	2007	Britney Spears	Non-album appearance
"We Takin' Over" (Remix)	2007	DJ Khaled, Akon, R. Kelly, Young Jeezy, T-Pain	Non-album appearance
"Last Night" (NYC Remix)	2007	P. Diddy, Keyshia Cole, Busta Rhymes	Non-album appearance
"Real Chicks"	2007	Naturi Naughton	Non-album appearance
"Sensual Seduction" (Remix)	2008	Snoop Dogg	Non-album appearance
"Tek Weh Yuself Again"	2008	Mr. Vegas, Kat DeLuna	Non-album appearance
"Pop Champagne" (Remix)	2008	Ron Browz, Ludacris, Swizz Beatz	Non-album appearance
"Caribbean Connection"	2008	Wyclef Jean, Mavado	Non-album appearance
"She Got It" (J.U.S.T.I.C.E. League Remix)	2008	2 Pistols, Twista, T-Pain	Non-album appearance
"Dey Know" (NY Remix)	2008	Shawty Lo, Busta Rhymes, Maino	Non-album appearance
"I Like to Trick" (Remix)	2008	Ray J	Non-album appearance
"Kiss & Tell"	2009	Ray J	Non-album appearance
"Beep" (Remix)	2009	Bobby Valentino, Lil Wayne, Ludacris	Non-album appearance
"Turn My Swag On" (Remix)	2009	Keri Hilson, Teyana Taylor	Non-album appearance
"Raincheck"	2009	Mu Dills	Non-album appearance
"Download" (Remix)	2009	T-Pain, Charlie Wilson, The-Dream, Soulja Boy	Non-album appearance
"10 Date Commandments"	2010	Am8er	Non-album appearance
"I Wanna Rock" (The Queens G-Mix)	2010	Snoop Dogg, The Lady of Rage	Non-album appearance
"Kimnotyze 2013"	2012	Roby Rob	Non-album appearance
"Keys to the City"	2012	Young Jeezy	Non-album appearance
"Set It Off"	2012	Nova Aka Jaystack "The Messenger"	Non-album appearance
"Twisted"	2013	Tiffany Foxx	Non-album appearance
"1 Hunnit"	2013	Young Goldie	Non-album appearance
"Money Make Me"	2013	Hemo Brown	Non-album appearance
"Migo"	2014	TLZ, Young Bonds	Non-album appearance

== See also ==
- Lil' Kim videography
