= Lil' Kim videography =

Lil' Kim video discography
- Music videos: 22
- Featured music videos: 22
- Films: 14
- Commercials: 5
- Documentaries: 6

The singer, songwriter and actress "Lil' Kim" (Kimberley Denise Jones) has appeared in a wide variety of music videos, films and television commercials since the 1990s. She has also written many songs for film and television.

== Music videos ==
=== Lead artist videos ===
Key
†	Denotes music videos that have not yet been released

List of music videos, showing year released, album and director
Title	Year	Director(s)	Album
Time To Shine (feat. Mona Lisa)	1996	Lance "Un" Rivera	Don't Be a Menace to South Central While Drinking Your Juice in the Hood
No Time (feat. Puff Daddy)	1996	Marcus Nispel	Hard Core
"Crush on You" (feat. Lil' Cease)	1997	Lance "Un" Rivera	Hard Core
"Not Tonight" (feat. Missy Elliott, Left Eye, Da Brat & Angie Martinez)	1997	Lance "Un" Rivera	Hard Core
No Matter What They Say	2000	Marcus Raboy	The Notorious K.I.M.
How Many Licks (feat. Sisqó)	2000	Francis Lawrence	The Notorious K.I.M.
Lady Marmalade (feat. Christina Aguilera, Mya, & Pink)	2001	Paul Hunter	Moulin Rouge
In the Air Tonite (feat. Phil Collins)	2001	—N/a	Urban Renewal
The Jump Off (feat. Mr. Cheeks)	2003	Benny Boom	La Bella Mafia
Came Back For You	2003	J. Jesses Smith	La Bella Mafia
Lighters Up	2005	Kirk Fraser	The Naked Truth
Whoa	2006	Kirk Fraser	The Naked Truth
Caribbean Connection (feat. Wyclef Jean & Movado)	2008	Sam Reifel	—N/a
Download (feat. T-Pain & Charlie Wilson)	2009	Rage	Non-album single
Black Friday	2011	Picture Perfect	Black Friday
Look Like Money	2013	Kalechi "Kal" Noel	—N/a
Took Us a Break	2017	Sebastian Sdaigui	TBA
Spicy (feat. Fabolous)	2018	Peter Dmitriyev	TBA
Nasty One	2018	Peter Dmitriyev	9
Go Awff	2019	Peter Dmitriyev	9

=== Cameo appearances ===
List of music videos, showing year released, album and director
Title	Performer(s)	Director(s)	Album	Year
"Teenage Love"	Slick Rick	—N/a	The Great Adventures of Slick Rick	1988
"Party and Bullshit"	The Notorious B.I.G.	—N/a	Who's the Man?	1993
"If Your Girl Only Knew"	Aaliyah	Joseph Kahn	One in a Million	1996
"Hot Like Fire"	Aaliyah	Lance "Un" Rivera	One in a Million	1997
"The Rain (Supa Dupa Fly)"	Missy Elliott	Hype Williams	Supa Dupa Fly	1997
"Sock It 2 Me"	Missy Elliott, Da Brat	Hype Williams	Supa Dupa Fly	1997
"We'll Always Love Big Poppa"	The LOX	—N/a	Money, Power & Respect	1997
"It's So Hard"	Big Pun, Donell Jones	Chris Robinson	Yeeeah Baby	2000
"I Just Wanna Love U (Give It 2 Me)"	Jay-Z	Dave Meyers	The Dynasty: Roc La Familia	2000
"Feelin' on Yo Booty"	R. Kelly	Billie Woodruff	TP-2.com	2001
"Miss You"	Aaliyah	Darren Grant	I Care 4 U	2002
"Go Head"	Queen Latifah	Zodiac Fishgrease	She's a Queen: A Collection of Hits	2002
"These Days"	Alien Ant Farm	Marc Klasfeld	TruANT	2003
"Rumors"	Maino	Zaire Baptiste	—N/a	2005
"Everywhere We Go"	French Montana, Wale	DRE Films	—N/a	2012
"The Golden Child"	Papoose, Remy Ma, Angelica Vila	—N/a	Underrated	2019

=== Collaboration Videos ===
List of music videos, showing year released, album and director
Title	Performer(s)	Director(s)	Album	Year
Player's Anthem	Junior M.A.F.I.A. The Notorious B.I.G.	Lance "Un" Rivera	Conspiracy	1995
I Need You Tonight	Junior M.A.F.I.A. Aaliyah	Lance "Un" Rivera	Conspiracy	1995
Get Money	Junior M.A.F.I.A. The Notorious B.I.G.	Lance "Un" Rivera	Conspiracy	1996

=== As featured artist ===
Key
†	Denotes music videos that have not yet been released

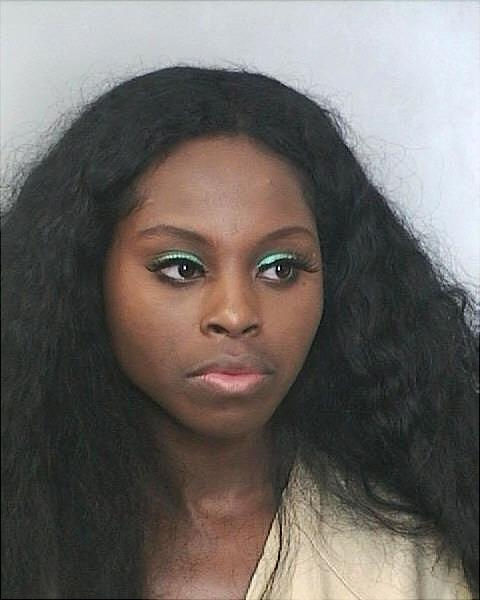
Rap Rivals Foxy Brown & Lil' Kim Appeared on the remix of Totals song "No One Else".

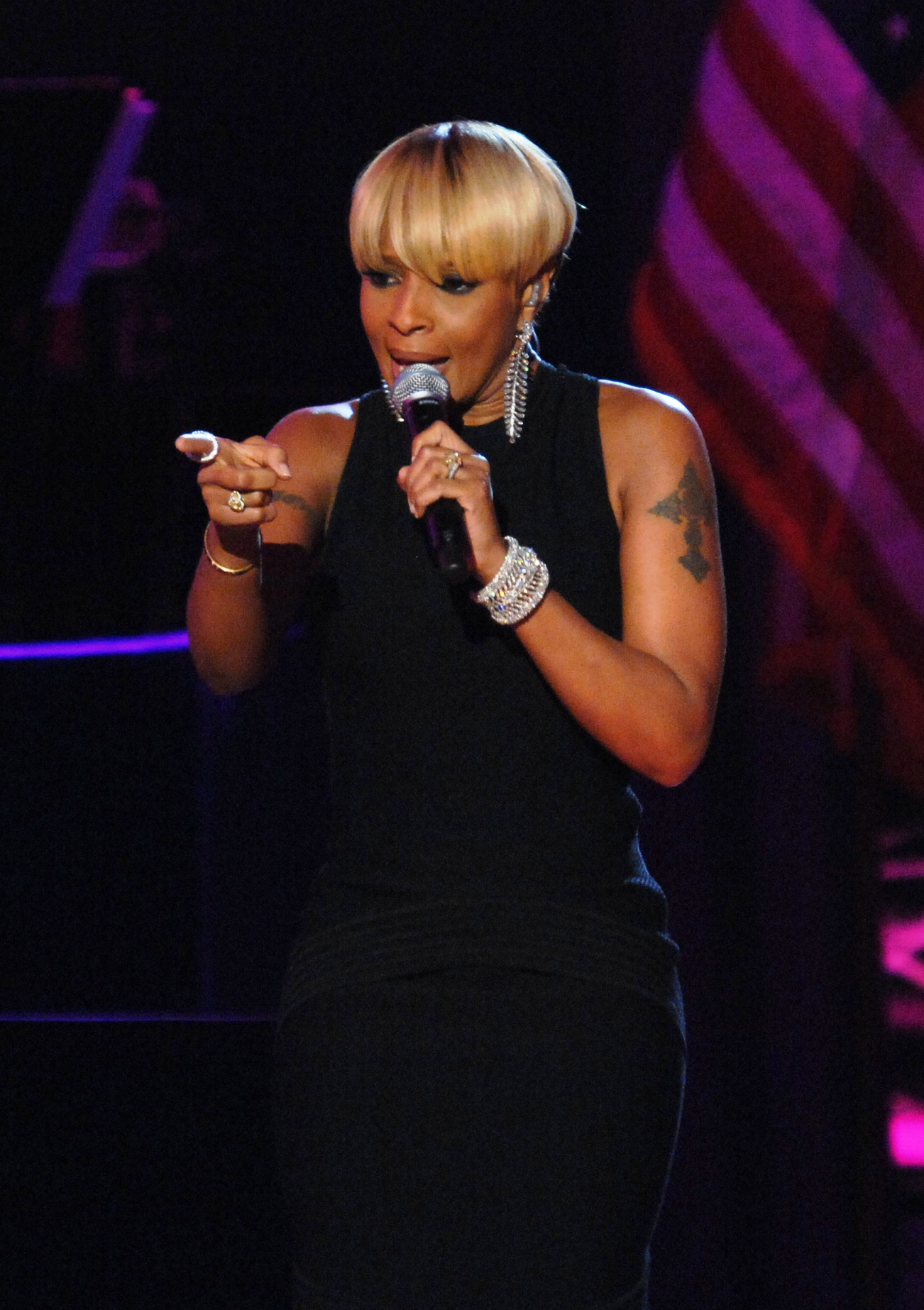
Kim was a guest vocalist on Mary J. Blige single "I Can Love You"

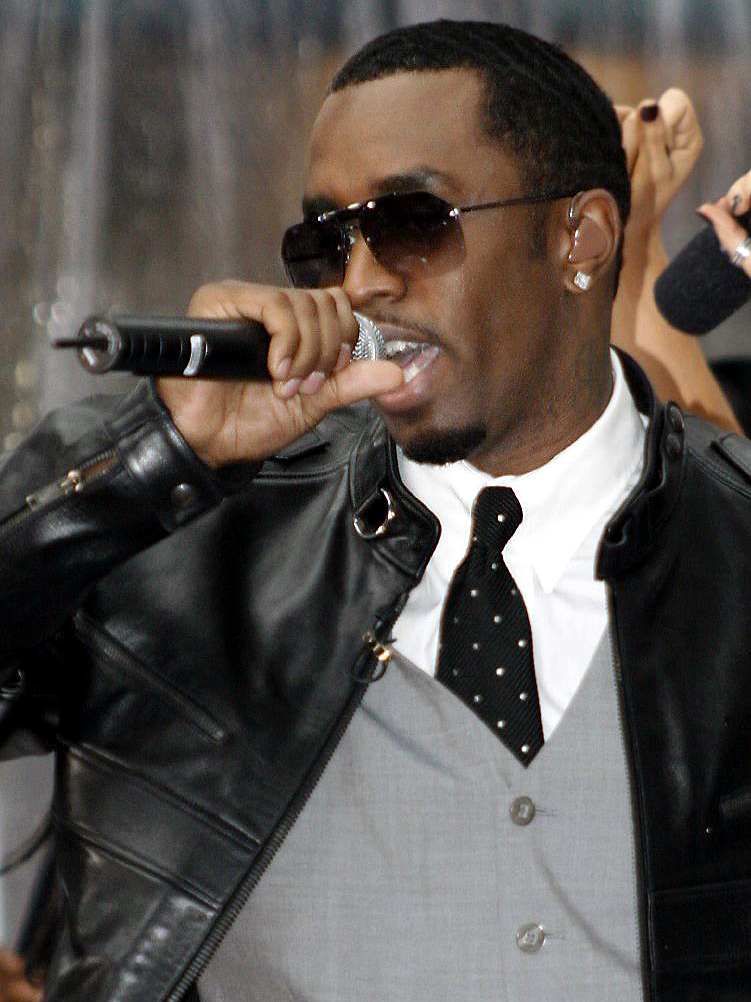
Kim was a guest vocalist for Puffy single "Notorious" which also featured The Notorious B.I.G.

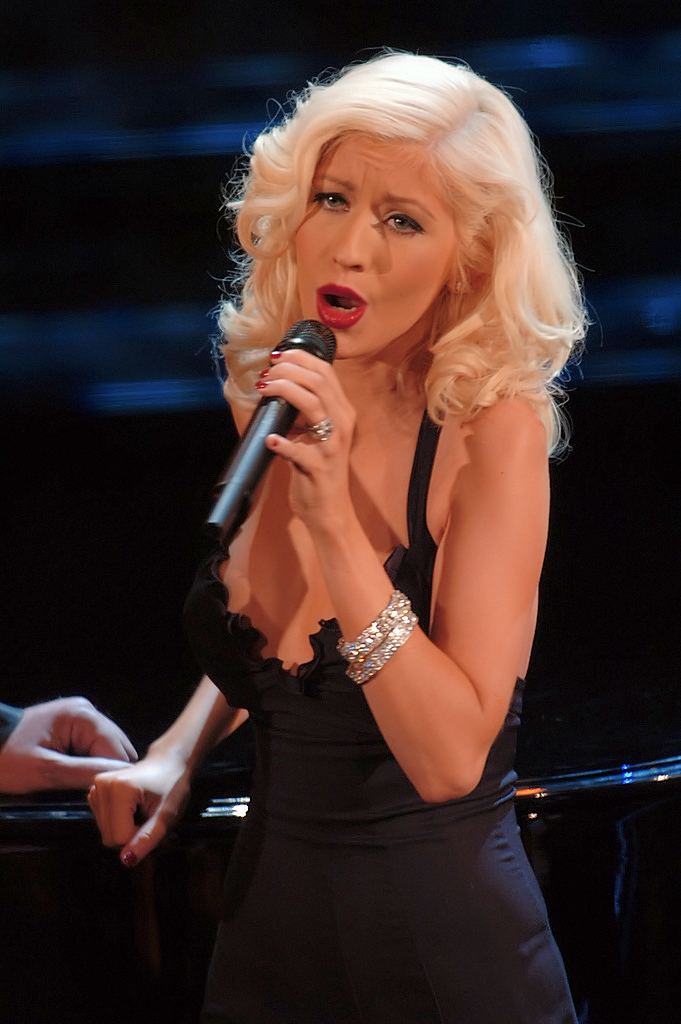
Kim featured as a guest vocalist for Christina Aguilera single "Can't Hold Us Down".

List of music videos, showing year released, album and director
Title	Year	Director(s)
No One Else Remix ( with Total, Foxy Brown, Puffy)	1995	Lance Un Rivera
Floating on Your Love ( with The Isley Brothers, Angela Winbush, 112)	1996	Alan Ferguson
No More Games (with Skin Deep)	1996	N/A
I Can Love You (with Mary J. Blige)	1997	Kevin Bray
It's All About the Benjamins (with The Lox, Puffy)	1997	Paul Hunter
It's All About the Benjamins (Rock Remix) (with The Lox, Puffy)	1997	Spike Jonze
Money Power Respect (with The Lox, DMX)	1998	Alan Smithee
Quiet Storm (Remix) (with Mobb Deep)	1999	Hype Williams
Play Around (with Lil' Cease)	1999	Marcus Nispel
Get Naked (with Methods of Mayhem)	1999	Chris Hafner
Biggie (with The Notorious B.I.G., Junior M.A.F.I.A.)	1999	—N/a
Notorious B.I.G. (with Puffy The Notorious B.I.G.)	2000	Puffy
Wait A Minute (with Ray J)	2001	Billie Woodruff
Whats Going On (Dupri R&B Mix) (with Monica, Jagged Edge, TLC, Destinys Child, Britney Spears, Mary J. Blige, Alicia Keys, Usher)	2001	Jake Scott
Kimnotyze (with DJ Tomekk)	2002	Norman Hafezi
Can't Hold Us Down (with Christina Aguilera)	2003	David LaChapelle
Sugar (Gimmie Some) (with Trick Daddy, Cee-Lo Green)	2005	Ray Kay
Stomp (with Maino)	2006	Kirk Fraser
Let It Go (with Keyshia Cole, Missy Elliott)	2007	Benny Boom
Girls (with Se7en)	2009	Rage
10 Date Commandments (with Amber)	2010	Rage
Jay-Z (with Tiffany Foxx)	2013	Picture Perfect
Twisted (with Tiffany Foxx)	2013	Jonathan Andrade
Auction (with Puffy, Styles P, King Los)	2016	Hype Williams
Wake Me Up (with Remy Ma)	2017	Efrain Rivera

== Filmography ==
=== Television ===
Year	Film	Character	Notes
1997	House of Style	Herself	House of Style is an MTV show that premiered on January 1, 1989. The show focused on fashion, lives of models and the modeling industry. Lil' Kim appeared in season 9 episode 7. Viewers were taken behind the scenes of her photo shoot for Visionaire magazine, shot by Terry Richardson.
1999	VIP	Freedom Fighter	V.I.P. is an American action/comedy-drama series starring Pamela Anderson. Created by J. F. Lawton, the series aired in syndication for four seasons from 1998 to 2002.
1999	FANatic	Herself	FANatic is an American TV show that was shown on the MTV network in the late 1990s. It featured fans going somewhere and meeting their idol. Lil' Kim appeared in season 4 ep 4.
2000	House of Style	Herself	House of Style is an MTV show that premiered on January 1, 1989. The show focused on fashion, lives of models and the modeling industry. Lil' Kim appeared in season 12 episode 71, modeling her favorite swimsuits of the season.
2001	DAG	Gina Mari	DAG is an American sitcom that aired from November 2000 to May 2001 on NBC. Lil Kim played a minor role in an episode.
2001	Moesha	Diamond	Moesha is an American sitcom series that aired on the UPN network from January 23, 1996 to May 14, 2001. Lil' Kim appeared on season 6 ep 12.
2001	Making the Video	Herself	Making the Video is an MTV show, consisting of half-hour episodes, which chronicles the process of filming various music videos. Lil' Kim appeared in season 5, making the video for "Lady Marmalade" with Christina Aguilera, Pink and Mýa.
2001	The Parkers	Herself	The Parkers is an American sitcom that aired on UPN from August 30, 1999, to May 10, 2004. A spin-off of UPN's Moesha.
2003	American Dreams	Shirley Ellis	American Dreams is an American television drama program broadcast on the NBC television network.
2004	The Apprentice	Herself	Lil' Kim was featured in season 2 episode 6. She attended the runway show for the fashion lines created by the apprentices.
2005	The Apprentice	Herself	Lil' Kim was part of the apprentices task to raise money for an organisation.
2006	Lil' Kim: Countdown to Lockdown	Herself	Played by lil kim. This show was aired before she went to jail in 2006.
2007	The Game	Herself	The Game is an American comedy-drama television series created by Mara Brock Akil. Lil Kim made a Special Guest Appearance.
2007	The Pussycat Dolls Present: The Search for the Next Doll	Judge	Lil kim played one of the 4 judges on panel.
2008	Pussycat Dolls Present: Girlicious	Judge	Lil kim played one of the 4 judges on panel.
2009	Dancing with the Stars	Contestant	Lil' Kim & Derek got voted off on the 9th episode of Season 8.
2009	Paris Hilton's My New BFF	Herself	Lil' kim made a special guest appearance on the second season of Paris Hiltons My New BFF.
2010	My Super Sweet 16	Herself	Lil' Kim made a cameo appearance. Sang happy birthday to Justin.
2012	Pregnant in Heels	Herself	Lil' Kim made a cameo appearance on Season 2, Episode 6.
2014	Celebrities Undercover	Jamilla	Lil' Kim went undercover as a pregnant woman outside of her own VIP listening party to see if her fans were still "hardcore"
2014	David Tutera's CELEBrations	Herself	Lil' Kim had David Tutera plan her "Royal Baby Shower" before she was set to give birth to her daughter Royal Reign.
2015	BET: Awards	Herself	Lil' Kim performed w/ Bad Boy at the 2015 BET Awards performing "All About The Benjamins w/ The Lox and Diddy.
2015	BET : HipHop Awards	Herself	Lil' Kim performed her new single "Auction" with Diddy and King Los

=== Films ===
List of cinematic film releases, showing year released, role, director and Box office
Title	Year	Role	Director(s)	Budget	Box office	Ref.
Title	Year	Role	Director(s)	USD (millions)		Ref.
Gangstresses	1997	Herself	N/A	0	0	
She's All That	1999	Alex Chason Sawyer	Robert Iscove	10	104	
Longshot	2000	Herself	Lionel C. Martin	0	0	
Zoolander	2001	Herself	Ben Stiller	28	60	
Juwanna Mann	2002	Tina Parker	Jesse Vaughan	16	55	
Those Who Walk in Darkness	2003	Souldad	John Ridley	0	0	
Nora's Hair Salon	2004	Herself	Jerry LaMothe	5	0	
You Got Served	2004	Herself	Chris Stokes	8	48	
Lil' Pimp	2005	Herself	Mark Brooks	0	0	
There's a God on the Mic	2005	Herself	Kool Moe Dee	0	0	
Life After Death: The Movie – Ten Years Later	2007	Herself	N/A	0	0	
Superhero Movie	2008	Xavier's Daughter	Craig Mazin	35	71	
Total film gross as an actress				USD382 Million		

=== Video games ===
Year	Title	Role	Notes
2004	Def Jam: Fight for NY	Herself	Voice only

=== Featured music ===
List of Lil' Kim songs used in film and television. For soundtrack appearances see Lil' Kim discography.

Year	Title	Songs
Film
2001	Un paso adelante. Historia de una serie	"Lady Marmalade" (with Christina Aguilera, Pink and Mýa)
2002	Ali G Indahouse	"Fresh From Yard" (feat. Beenie Man)
2002	Happy Homicidal	"Will They Die For You" (feat. Mase & Puff Daddy)
2002	Biggie & Tupac	"Play Around" (feat. Lil' Cease, Joe Hooker & Mr. Bristol)
2005	King's Ransom	"Magic Stick" (feat. 50 Cent)
2005	Prime	"Get Money"
2007	Knocked Up	"Lighters Up"
2009	Notorious	"Big Momma Thang", "Get Money"
Television
2002	Un Paso Adelante	Episode – Arriba el telón: "Lady Marmalade" (with Christina Aguilera, Pink and Mýa)
2008	I Love the New Millennium	Episode – 2001: "Lady Marmalade" (with Christina Aguilera, Pink and Mýa)
2009	EastEnders	Episode dated September 22, 2009: "Lady Marmalade" (with Christina Aguilera, Pink and Mýa)
2009	So You Think You Can Dance Canada	Episode – Top 12 Results: "The Jump Off" (feat. Mr. Cheeks)
2010	The Inbetweeners	Episode – The Fashion Show: "Lady Marmalade" (with Christina Aguilera, Pink and Mýa)
2012	The Cleveland Show	Episode – Brown Magic: "Magic Stick" (feat. 50 Cent)
2015	Empire	Episode – Out, Damned Spot: "The Jump Off" (feat. Mr. Cheeks)
Video games
2005	WrestleMania 21	"Time to Rock and Roll"

== Commercials ==
Key
†	Denotes commercials that have not yet been released

List of commercials, showing year released, company/product, director and description
Year	Company/product	Director	Description
Commercials
2000	Super Bowl XXXIV	N/A	Pre Super Bowl commercial
2001	Apple Inc.	N/A	Commercial for Apple's Mac computers. It highlighted how users could burn custom CD's on their Mac. Also featured George Clinton, Barry White, Iggy Pop, Smash Mouth, De La Soul, Ziggy Marley, Deep Dish, Aimee Mann and Wilco. With the slogan Rip Mix Burn.
2003	AOL	N/A	The Jump Off single by Lil' Kim Used in an AOL commercial to promote how fast their upload rate is.
2003	Old Navy	N/A	Lil Kim promoting graphic hoods for winter.
2014	Oxygen	N/A	Appears in oxygens newest reality TV show commercial Celebrities Undercover
