= King Foxx =

Mixtape by Tiffany Foxx
- Released: June 16, 2014
- Genre: Southern hip hop; trap
- Length: 46:06
- Label: International Rock Star
- Producer: Tiffany Foxx (exec.)

Tiffany Foxx chronology
Goal Diggers (2013)	King Foxx (2014)

Singles from King Foxx
- 1. "Young N Thuggin" Released: March 10, 2014

King Foxx, also known as King Foxx: Rule By Decree, is the third mixtape released by American rapper Tiffany Foxx. It was released on June 16, 2014 through the record label International Rock Star. King Foxx is a Southern hip hop and trap mixtape. The lead single "Young N Thuggin", featuring Pusha T, Young Thug, and Chubbie Baby, was released on March 10, 2014. Foxx promoted "FuckUThought" and "Bet It" through music videos. In a 2015 interview, Foxx announced plans for a reissue entitled King Foxx: Extra Clip. Reception of King Foxx was positive. Some critics have compared Foxx's rapping style to other artists.

== Background and composition ==
Tiffany Foxx said that King Foxx represented her "ratchet side" and her "lyric side", along with "the passionate side of [herself] and the very creative, different side". She described the mixtape as trap music. When explaining its title, Foxx identified herself as a king due to her understanding of the word meaning "the highest supreme being". Saying that female rappers receive little respect, she wanted to use the title "king" to place herself on a similar platform with men.

King Foxx is a Southern hip hop and trap mixtape that consists of thirteen songs. Writing for Pitchfork, Meaghan Garvey associated the features and production with Southern hip hop, and Wesley Case referred to the tracks as built on "Southern trap and swag-rap beats". Twelve rappers provide features, and DJ Scream acts as its host by providing "staccato flows" and "trap beats". Discussing the songs, Foxx said that she wanted to be "more lyrical" and discuss women's issues. She intentionally switched her rap style for each of the mixtape's songs to discourage comparisons to other performers.

Vibe's Mikey Fresh wrote that Foxx adopts a braggadocio attitude for "Cdis", and identified "Selfies" as suited for clubs and radio airplay. In "Young N Thuggin", which XXL's Eric Diep described as a "heavy-hitting banger", Foxx raps about helping her boyfriend recover after being released from prison. She talks about her past in St. Louis through the lyrics: "Magic trick, make you disappear / Family ain't got a clue nigga / Been in drive-bys with fly guys / Welcome to the Lou nigga". Pitchfork's Corban Goble cited "FuckUThought" and "Young and Thuggin" as adhering to 2014 music trends.

== Release and promotion ==
While King Foxx was initially planned for a release on Valentine's Day, the mixtape was delayed to June 16, 2014. Foxx explained she changed the release date to record additional material and finalize the track listing. She wanted the mixtape to expand the reach of her music to a larger audience and elevate her career to "the next level". Prior to its release, Foxx had leaked the songs "Young N Thuggin" and "Intro" through HotNewHipHop. In a 2014 interview, she said that she would temporarily stop recording mixtapes.

"Young N Thuggin" was released on March 10, 2014, as the lead single from King Foxx. It contains additional verses from Pusha T, Young Thug, and Chubbie Baby. Young Thug raps for the hook. According to XXL, the song had made "an impact online" and was setting Foxx on "the right path to becoming a household name". Music videos for "FuckUThought" and "Bet It" were released on YouTube and Foxx's official website, respectively, and the audio for "Don't Trust Em" was uploaded on YouTube on May 8, 2014. In a 2015 interview, Foxx discussed plans to reissue King Foxx under the new title King Foxx: Extra Clip. According to Foxx, the rerelease would feature new songs, and would be her method of "bring[ing] back awareness" to herself.

== Critical reception ==
King Foxx received positive feedback from critics. Diep praised the mixtape as showcasing Foxx's versatility, and Ebony's Nadeska Alexis wrote it proved the rapper was "a truly talented lyricist and showman". Citing "Cdis" as a highlight, Goble described King Foxx as Foxx's "most notable [and] cohesive" release in her career. In a positive review, Case said: "Tiffany's mic skills and welcome female perspective invigorate this tape." Despite praising Foxx as having "the flow, beat selection and lyrics to be taken serious", Fresh criticized the final tracks; specifically, "Buy Her What She Want" and "Don't Trust Em". Despite his criticisms, Fresh summed up King Foxx as "a good listen" from a "rising rapper".

Critics compared Foxx's performance to other artists. Diep felt that her "animated and fluid flow" throughout the mixtape was similar to Lil' Kim, who mentored Foxx. In 2012, she was the first artist signed with Lil' Kim's label, International Rock Star. Diep likened Foxx's approach to "Bet It" with Gucci Mane. Writers for Pitchfork said that Foxx had a similar style to Nicki Minaj and Young Thug. Garvey said that Foxx had "exaggerated, rubbery voice-acting", which she paralleled with Minaj's performance on the 2010 song "Roman's Revenge". Case cited "Don't Trust Em" as sounding like a "paranoid Nicki/Young Thug session". Garvey and Case equated Foxx's delivery on "Cdis" and "Buy Her What She Want" as similar to Future's 2013 song "Karate Chop". Case described "Buy Her What She Want" as initially sounding like "another 'Karate Chop' stutter-fest", but felt one of Foxx's verses was more original and had an "off-the-cuff fluidity".

== Track listing ==
No.	Title	Producer(s)	Length
1.	"Intro"	Vega Heartbreak	1:53
2.	"Cdis"	Sonny Digital	3:12
3.	"FuckUThought"	Bradd Young; Vega Heartbreak	3:40
4.	"Selfies"	DJ Wolfgang	3:15
5.	"Young N Thuggin" (featuring Young Thug, Pusha T and Chubbie Baby)	K.E. on the Track	4:41
6.	"King Foxx" (featuring Hasini)	Big Fraze	2:10
7.	"Goaldiggers" (featuring Tracy T)	Beat Mechanics	4:06
8.	"Uno" (featuring Fast Life)	Joe	3:49
9.	"Don't Trust Em"	Kid Class	3:28
10.	"Buy Her What She Wants" (featuring Chubbie Baby)	Beat Mechanics	3:34
11.	"Bet It"	Zaytoven	3:44
12.	"Double Cup (Remix)" (featuring Yo Gotti, Kirko Bangz, Ace Hood, Jim Jones and Snootie Wild)	K.E. on the Track	5:12
13.	"You're the Reason"	Kid Class	3:24
Total length:			46:06

== Credits and personnel ==
Credits adapted from the liner notes of King Foxx:

- Chubbie Baby – A&R
- DJ Scream – host

== Release history ==
Country	Date	Format	Label	Ref.
United States	June 16, 2014	Digital download	International Rock Star	
