= Took Us a Break =

Promotional single by Lil' Kim
- Released: November 3, 2017
- Recorded: 2017
- Genre: Hip hop; trap
- Length: 2:59
- Label: Queen Bee Entertainment; Entertainment One
- Songwriters: Kimberly Jones; Lonnie Kimble; Brandon Korn; Austin Schindler
- Producers: Bkorn; Austin Powerz

Lil' Kim singles chronology
"Wake Me Up" (2017)	"Took Us a Break" (2017)	"Nasty One" (2018)

"Took Us a Break" is a song recorded by American rapper Lil' Kim. It was released on November 3, 2017, by Queen Bee Entertainment and Entertainment One Music.

== Background ==
At the Urban One's 2017 Blitz Showcase in New York City, Jones described the song as her "set-up record" and announced that the lead single off her upcoming album would be released in January 2018.

The producer of the song, Bkorn, in an interview said that "the beat came from a melody that Austin Powerz sent to me a while back. I changed the pitch and tempo of what he sent me; added my drums, 808s and synths to make it a banger. A few months later, we had a session with Skeme, who laced a few hooks on some beats, one being the "Took Us A Break" beat."

== Music video ==
On August 2, 2017, Jones shared several photos and a video from the set of a "secret project" on her Instagram account. In the behind-the-scenes video, accompanied by Cardi B's song "Bodak Yellow", she says: "Secret location. Secret video. Cannot tell you... Just the first video letting everybody know that Beehive is back!"

Directed by Sebastian Sdaigui, the music video was premiered on October 11 at the Urban One's Annual Blitz Showcase in New York City. On November 3, the video was officially released on Vevo along with the single becoming available on most digital music platforms. Ryan Reed of Rolling Stone described the video as "eerie", noting its "blend of ordinary rap clip imagery, such as strippers and stacks of cash, with ominous shots of snakes, spiders and nuns with bleeding eyes".

== Release history ==
Region	Release date	Format	Label
Worldwide	November 3, 2017	Digital download	Queen Bee Entertainment; Entertainment One
