= Melanin Magic =

2018 single by Remy Ma

Single by Remy Ma featuring Chris Brown
- Released: January 19, 2018
- Length: 2:57
- Label: Reminisce
- Songwriters: Keirston Lewis; Reminisce Mackie; Ricky Kinchen; Stokley Williams; Atia Boggs; Jeffrey Allen; Dallas Austin; Lawrence Waddell; Christopher Brown
- Producer: Dallas Austin

Remy Ma singles chronology
"Wake Me Up" (2017)	"Melanin Magic" (2018)	"Company" (2018)

Chris Brown singles chronology
"Either Way" (2017)	"Melanin Magic" (2018)	"Tempo" (2018)

Music video
- "Melanin Magic" on YouTube

"Melanin Magic" (alternatively "Melanin Magic (Pretty Brown)"), is a song by American rapper Remy Ma featuring American singer Chris Brown. It was written by the artists alongside Keirston Lewis, Ricky Kinchen, Stokley Williams, Atia "INK" Boggs, Jeffrey Allen, Lawrence Waddell, and producer Dallas Austin. The song was released via Reminisce Records on January 19, 2018. The song was nominated for the BET Her Award at the BET Awards 2018.

== Background and release ==
The collaboration was first revealed by Ma during her appearance on Total Request Live in November 2017. "The next single is with Chris Brown," she said. "'Melanin Magic', aka 'Pretty Brown', It's amazing." On January 16, 2018, Ma shared a snippet of the song on social media. The song samples Mint Condition's "Breakin' My Heart (Pretty Brown Eyes)", and was announced with a cover art contest, which allowed fans to vote on three different options.

Ma explained in a video on Instagram that this song was meant to empower. "I just wanted to make something to let people know that you're beautiful, you're pretty," she said. "You can be brown skin, dark skin, light skinned. None of that is what makes you pretty or beautiful. It's what's inside."

== Commercial performance ==
Commercially, Melanin Magic peaked at #17 on Billboard Mainstream R&B/Hip-Hop chart, #24 on Billboard Rhythmic chart, #18 on Billboard Rap Airplay chart, #29 on Billboard R&B/Hip-Hop Airplay chart and was the #1 most added song on Urban Radio.

== Critical reception ==
C. Vernon Coleman II of XXL opined that Ma "puts a new spin on an old classic", writing that "Austin chops the R&B track into something more suitable to spit over, and Rem takes the opportunity to talk a little greasy". Eric Skelton of Complex thinks that the song shows Ma's "catchier, more radio-friendly side". Jasmine Grant of VH1 described the song as "a ladies anthem and '90s tribute all wrapped into one", and wrote that Brown is "the perfect selection for the catchy hook". Will Lavin of Joe felt that Ma and Brown "have created an ode to the regality of brown skin". Mike Nied of Idolator deemed the song "a retro romance with an empowering message for women" which "has a bit more crossover appeal" over the album's lead single "Wake Me Up", calling it "another promising release" from Ma. James Dinh of iHeartRadio regarded the song as "a romantic ode to loving your own body".

== Credits and personnel ==
Credits adapted from Tidal.

- Remy Ma – songwriting
- Chris Brown – songwriting
- Keirston Lewis – songwriting
- Ricky Kinchen – songwriting
- Stokley Williams – songwriting
- Atia Boggs – songwriting
- Jeffrey Allen – songwriting
- Dallas Austin – songwriting, production
- Lawrence Waddell – songwriting
- Matthew Testa – mix engineering
- Colin Leonard – master engineering
- Alexander "Smitty Beatz" Smith – record engineering

== Charts ==
Chart (2018)	Peak position
US Rhythmic Airplay (Billboard)	24
US R&B/Hip-Hop Airplay (Billboard)	29
