= Wanna Lick =

"Wanna Lick (Magic Stick Pt. 2)"

Song by Lil' Kim featuring G-Unit

from the album Ms. G.O.A.T.
- Released: October 19, 2007
- Recorded: 2003–2007
- Genre: Dirty rap
- Label: G-Unit, Interscope
- Songwriters: Curtis Jackson, Kimberly Jones
- Producer: Biggz Da Butcher

"Wanna Lick" is a song by American rapper Lil' Kim featuring G-Unit, released on October 19, 2007. It was announced as the first promotional single from G-Unit's second studio album, T·O·S (Terminate on Sight). Due to this, the track did not appear on T.O.S and is now considered a promo single for Lil' Kim's mixtape, Ms. G.O.A.T.

== Background ==
The song only features 50 Cent and Lil' Kim with Tony Yayo providing minor background effects. The track has been dubbed the second version of "Magic Stick" and was made possible due to Young Buck bringing 50 Cent and Lil' Kim together to reconcile after a feud was started shortly after "Magic Stick" was released in 2003. The producer of the track was unknown until J. Armz released "How To Be An MC Vol. 48", where the producer of "Wanna Lick" was listed as Biggz Da Butcher. The single made its premiere via Hot 97 when Funkmaster Flex aired the track on October 19, 2007.

== Track listing ==
US promo vinyl

- "Wanna Lick" (Dirty) – 3:38
- "Wanna Lick" (Clean Extended) – 4:26
- "Wanna Lick" (Instrumental) – 2:25
- "Wanna Lick" (Radio) – 3:38
