= 9 (Lil' Kim album) =

Studio album by Lil' Kim
- Released: October 11, 2019
- Genres: Hip hop; trap
- Length: 30:59
- Labels: Queen Bee; eOne
- Producers: Xtassy; Jonny Chash; 808 Mafia

Lil' Kim chronology
Lil Kim Season (2016)	9 (2019)	Now Playing (2024)

Singles from 9
- 1. "Go Awff" Released: February 15, 2019; 2. "Found You" Released: September 27, 2019; 3. "Pray for Me" Released: October 3, 2019

9 is the fifth studio album by American rapper Lil' Kim. It was released on October 11, 2019, through Queen Bee Entertainment and eOne. The single "Go Awff" was released on February 15, 2019. During the taping of VH1's Girls Cruise reunion episode, Kim confirmed her intention to release the second volume of 9 in 2020.

== Background ==
On March 23, 2019, Lil' Kim announced that the album would be released on May 17, 2019. The rapper described the meaning behind her fifth album in an interview with BET on the red carpet at the 2019 BET Awards: "It's a spiritual awakening number for me. Also, when I started out in Junior M.A.F.I.A. it was 9 members, my daughter was born June 9th, Biggie died March 9th, it is 2019. It's a powerful number for me. (...) I'm very spiritual and one day God was talking to me and I was like '7 is my favorite number' and He was like 'yes but 9 is your favored number' and I said thank you Jesus, I love you. I'm going with 9." In April, she announced that the label eOne had decided to push back the release of the album which was then expected to premiere in July 2019 to coincide with Kim's reality show Girls Cruise.

== Promotion ==
The 2018 song "Nasty One", previously slated as the album's first single, eventually was not included in the track list. "Go Awff", released in February 2019, instead became the lead single, with a music video released in March. In April, the rapper released a promotional single "No Auto Blanco" exclusively for streaming on SoundCloud. It was followed by the second official single "Found You" featuring O.T. Genasis, City Girls and Watts Up Mickey in September 2019. On October 3, Lil' Kim released the third single, "Pray for Me", featuring Rick Ross and Musiq Soulchild, and confirmed October 11 as the final release date of the album. Although originally reported as consisting of 13 tracks, the album eventually featured only nine songs. The previously confirmed song "Missing" was left off the album.

Lil' Kim confirmed that the second part of 9 will be released at a later date and that it will feature a song with Missy Elliott and Paris Hilton as well as collaborations with Remy Ma, Fabolous, both of whom she has collaborated with in the past, on "Wake Me Up" and "Spicy", respectively and comedian Pretty Vee who featured on Girls Cruise. The first part of 9 was released as a deluxe edition to CD which featured “Nasty One (Remix)” as a bonus track. “Spicy” was released as a bonus track on the vinyl release of the album.

The promotional images were photographed by celebrity photographer Michael Antonio Hunter and styled by Misa Hylton.

== Critical reception ==
The album was on NPR's "best new albums of the week" at the time of its release, and was met with mixed to positive reviews from critics. Jordan Bassett of NME rated the album 3 out of 5 stars and described it as "lewd, contrarian and confrontational – all the qualities that make Kim an icon".

== Commercial performance ==
9 did not chart on the US Billboard 200 but it did reach number 47 on the Top Album Sales, number 7 on R&B/Hip Hop Album Sales and number 16 on the Independent Albums chart selling 2,627 pure album sales.

The album reached number 22 on the French Digital Albums, along with number 70 on the UK Album Downloads, and number 22 on the UK R&B Albums chart.

As of 2026 the album has sold 10,000 pure copies and has accumulated over 9.1 million streams averaging 1,000-1,500 daily Spotify streams

== Track listing ==
No.	Title	Writer(s)	Producer(s)	Length
1.	"Pray for Me" (featuring Rick Ross and Musiq Soulchild)	Kimberly Jones; Taalib Johnson; William Roberts	Xtassy	4:51
2.	"Bag"	Jones	Mark Henry	3:47
3.	"Catch My Wave" (featuring Rich the Kid)	Jones	Smash Davis	3:49
4.	"Go Awff"	Jones	Soundwave	3:12
5.	"Too Bad"	Jones	Orlando the Great	3:39
6.	"You Are Not Alone"	Jones	Grandz Muzik, Buda, Rondon	2:45
7.	"Found You" (featuring O.T. Genasis and City Girls)	Jonny Cash; Jones	Jonny Cash	3:32
8.	"Auto Blanco"	Jones	Jungle Boy Beats, DJ Mil-Ticket	2:10
9.	"Jet Fuel"	Jones	808 Mafia, AB on the Beat, Will Major	3:14
Total length:				30:59

CD deluxe edition
No.	Title	Writer(s)	Producer(s)	Length
10.	"Nasty One" (remix; featuring Stefflon Don, Kranium and HoodCelebrityy)	Jones; Stephanie Allen; Kemar Donaldson; Tina Pinnock	Bkorn	4:01
Total length:				34:59

Vinyl version
No.	Title	Writer(s)	Length
10.	"Spicy" (featuring Fabolous)	Jones; John Jackson	3:26

Sample credits

- "Catch My Wave" contains a sample of "OGFD" by Frank Dukes.
- "Go Awff" contains a sample of "Dangerous" by the xx.
- "Too Bad" contains an interpolation of "Get It Together" by 702.
- "You Are Not Alone" contains an interpolation of "You Are Not Alone" by Michael Jackson.
- "Found You" contains a sample of "Ms. New Booty" by Bubba Sparxxx and Ying Yang Twins.
- "Auto Blanco" contains a sample of "No Auto Durk" by Lil Durk.
- "Spicy" contains a sample of "Hot Stepper" by Ini Kamoze.

== Charts ==
Chart (2019)	Peak position
French Digital Albums (SNEP)	22
UK Album Downloads (OCC)	70
UK R&B Albums (OCC)	22
US Independent Albums (Billboard)	16
US R&B/Hip-Hop Album Sales (Billboard)	7
US Top Album Sales (Billboard)	47
