= Download (song) =

Single by Lil' Kim featuring T-Pain and Charlie Wilson
- Released: March 24, 2009
- Recorded: 2009
- Genre: Hip hop; R&B
- Length: 4:34
- Label: Queen Bee, Atlantic
- Songwriters: Kimberly Jones; Faheem Najm
- Producer: Trackmasters

Lil' Kim singles chronology
"Let it Go" (2007)	"Download" (2009)	"Wake Me Up" (2017)

T-Pain singles chronology
"All the Above" (2009)	"Download" (2009)	"Sun Come Up" (2009)

"Download" is a promotional single by American rapper Lil' Kim. It features R&B singers T-Pain and Charlie Wilson and was written by Lil' Kim and T-Pain and produced by Trackmasters. The song samples "Computer Love" by Zapp.

The song charted on the Billboard Bubbling Under Hot 100 for six weeks peaking at number 9, and 21 on the Billboard Hot R&B/Hip-Hop Songs chart.

== Music video ==
Animated T-Pain in the music video.

The video (Directed by Dale Resteghini) was shot on March 27, 2009, but T-Pain was unable to attend due to being in a golf cart accident that same day. The video was released on May 3, 2009 via Kim's MySpace and features Charlie Wilson as well as T-Pain, but in an animated form. Also, LisaRaye McCoy, Derek Hough, Khamani Griffin, & Lil B (For The Love Of Ray J) make cameos. The video ranked at #84 on BET's Notarized: Top 100 Videos of 2009 countdown.

== Remix ==
The official remix to the song features T-Pain, Charlie Wilson, The-Dream, & Soulja Boy Tell 'Em, it was leaked on the internet July 30, 2009. There is a leaked version of the remix that featured Soulja Boy with the 3 artists from the original version, that version was leaked on July 17, 2009. The remix's digital download was released on August 25, 2009.

== Formats and track listings ==
- US Promo CD

(Released: (April 2009)

1. "Download" (Radio edit) – 4:29
2. "Download" (Main) – 4:30
3. "Download" (Instrumental) – 4:32
4. "Download" (Acapella) – 3:50
5. "Download" (Original) – 4:30
- Digital download

(Released: April 2009)

1. "Download" – 4:30

== Chart performance ==
=== Weekly charts ===
Chart (2009)	Peak position
U.S. Billboard Bubbling Under Hot 100 Singles	9
U.S. Billboard Hot R&B/Hip-Hop Songs	21
U.S. Billboard Hot Rap Tracks	15

=== Year-end charts ===
Chart (2009)	Position
US Hot R&B/Hip-Hop Songs (Billboard)	97

== Release history ==
Region	Date	Label	Format
United States	April 2009	Atlantic, Big Gates Records	Official release
United States	April 2009	Atlantic, Big Gates Records	Radio
India	April 2009	Atlantic	Music download
United Kingdom	April 2009	Atlantic	Music download
United States	August 2009	Brookland, Federal Distribution	Music download (Remix)
