= Celebrities Undercover =

- Genre: Reality television
- Narrated by: Wendy Williams
- Country of origin: United States
- Original language: English
- No. of seasons: 1
- No. of episodes: 7

Production
- Executive producers: Jenny Daly; Gunnar Wetterberg; Billy Rainey; Lisa Knapp; Jill Ramsey; Kevin Hunter; Wendy Williams
- Camera setup: Multiple
- Running time: 21 minutes
- Production companies: T Group Productions; Wendy Williams Productions

Original release
- Network: Oxygen
- Release: March 18 – April 29, 2014

Celebrities Undercover is an American reality television series, which premiered on March 18, 2014, on the Oxygen cable network. The half-hour hidden camera series features various celebrities who wear heavy make-up or costumes in order to hide their identity, who later act in different situations to find out what their friends or fans really think about them. The reality show is executive produced and presented by talk show host Wendy Williams.

== Episodes ==
No.	Title	Original release date
1	"Wendy Williams & Kim Kardashian"	March 18, 2014
Talk show host Wendy Williams pretends to be a studio audience member on her own show. Reality television star Kim Kardashian goes undercover to hang out with her fans.
2	"Ice-T & Coco"	March 25, 2014
Actor Ice-T listens to his fans in a focus group for product endorsement, while his wife, model and actress Coco, attends a casting call for her body double.
3	"LuAnn de Lesseps & Kandi Burruss"	April 1, 2014
Television personality LuAnn de Lesseps attends a lunch party for wealthy Real Housewives fans. Singer and reality television star Kandi Burruss goes to a trunk show to listen to her fans about her new public image.
4	"Joey Fatone & Jaleel White"	April 8, 2014
Former NSYNC member Joey Fatone goes on a boy-band bus tour. Actor Jaleel White attends an auction selling Urkel memorabilia.
5	"T-Pain & Anthony Anderson"	April 15, 2014
Rapper T-Pain creates memorabilia for celebrities. Actor Anthony Anderson disguises as a chef.
6	"Adrienne Bailon & Chilli"	April 22, 2014
Singer Adrienne Bailon organizes an audition for her "new boyfriend" while Rozonda "Chilli" Thomas, a member of group TLC, casts backup dancers.
7	"Fantasia & Lil' Kim"	April 29, 2014
R&B singer Fantasia attends an audition to play in a musical about her life. Rapper Lil' Kim goes to a VIP party.
