= Hard Core (Lil' Kim mixtape) =

Hard Core 2K14

Mixtape by Lil' Kim
- Released: September 11, 2014
- Genre: Hip hop
- Length: 34:43
- Label: I.R.S Records

Lil' Kim chronology
Black Friday (2011)	Hard Core 2K14 (2014)	Lil Kim Season (2016)

Singles from Hard Core 2K14
- 1. "Dead Gal Walking" Released: October 31, 2013; 2. "I Am Kimmy Blanco" Released: November 30, 2013; 3. "Haterz" Released: April 24, 2014; 4. "Identity Theft" Released: August 6, 2014

Hard Core (also known as Hard Core 2K14) is the third mixtape by American rapper Lil' Kim, released on September 11, 2014 by I.R.S Records. The mixtape was first announced on July 26, 2013, and originally had a release date of October 31, 2013, but was pushed back due to Kim's pregnancy.

== Background ==
With fans often suggesting that Kim create something Hard Core inspired, the idea to recreate the "movement" came from Kim's manager, Big Fendi. News of the project first began circulating on July 10, 2013 when Big Mike The Ruler, who hosted Kim's previous mixtape, Black Friday, tweeted that work was beginning on a new mixtape and for beats to be sent in Kim officially announced the mixtape, Hard Core 2K13, on July 26, 2013, along with the cover art. On September 11, 2013, Kim announced that the mixtape would be released on October 31, 2013. On the day of release it was announced by Kim's manager, Big Fendi, that the mixtape had been pushed back to November 29, 2013, due to work not being completed on an app that was to accompany the mixtape. That same day, the track list was released. The mixtape was eventually pushed back again due to Kim's pregnancy and a new release date wasn't given until August 8, 2014 when it was announced that Hard Core 2K14 would be released on September 11, 2014. Kim choose to release the mixtape on September 11 as a way of remembering those who died in the September 11 attacks in 2001 and as a way of making those affected by the tragedy smile. A new cover was revealed on September 9, 2014, alluding to her debut album Hard Core from 1996. The cover also pays homage to LL Cool J's 1989 album Walking with a Panther.

== Music and lyrics ==
Although they share the same name, Hard Core 2K14 was never intended to serve as a part two to her debut album, Hard Core. Kim only wanted to give listeners a "taste" of the original. The title was more to do with recapturing the feeling that you got when you listened to her debut, a feeling Kim called "cocaine raps". Kim felt that the lyrical content also had a common feel with that of her debut, describing it as "heavy" and "sexual".

== Promotion ==
On September 20, 2014, Kim performed at The Source's first annual SOURCE360 concert at Barclays Center

== Critical reception ==
Hard Core received favorable reviews from critics. A writer for XXL wrote "With the original Hard Core ranking with the best in the mafioso genre, Hard Core 2k14 plays more of a reminder of who Lil Kim once was."

== Track listing ==
No.	Title	Length
1.	"Intro – In A Minor Part 2"	1:26
2.	"Stadium Music" (featuring Yo Gotti)	2:37
3.	"Identity Theft"	2:20
4.	"Real Sick" (featuring Jadakiss)	2:49
5.	"Trendsetter"	3:36
6.	"MIGO" (featuring TLZ & Young Bonds)	4:03
7.	"Whenever You See Me" (featuring Cassidy)	3:36
8.	"Work the Pole"	1:56
9.	"Suicide" (featuring French Montana)	3:11
10.	"Dead Gal Walking"	2:28
11.	"Kimmy Blanco"	3:16
12.	"Haterz" (featuring B. Ford)	3:25
Total length:		34:43
