= Lil Kim Season =

Mixtape by Lil' Kim
- Released: March 28, 2016
- Length: 33:29
- Label: I.R.S Records Queen Bee Entertainment

Lil' Kim chronology
Hard Core 2K14 (2014)	Lil Kim Season (2016)	9 (2019)

Singles from Lil Kim Season
- 1. "Mine" Released: February 18, 2016; 2. "Did It for Brooklyn" Released: March 9, 2016

Lil Kim Season is the fourth mixtape by American rapper Lil' Kim, released on March 28, 2016, by I.R.S Records.

== Background ==
Lil' Kim first announced on Hot 97 at the Hot 4 The Holidays concert that she was releasing an album in 2016 and she had a meeting with her former record label Atlantic Records to Negotiate a deal. A few days later Kim released That Bitch (Remix) a freestyle of Omarion's I'm Up on December 8 as a teaser for new music on the way. News broke in early February that Bryant McKinnie is going to be a part of Kim's 5th album what she still being recorded and act as A&R for the TBA album instead of producing. On February 13 news broke out that Maino and Kim have been in the studio working on a Freestyle of Panda by Desiigner the freestyle was released on the 16 on Lil' Kim SoundCloud page as promo for her single #Mine featuring Kevin Gates. Kim released #Mine on February 18 as a Buzz single for her 5th album. On March 9, 2016, Lil' Kim and Maino released a joint single called I Did it for Brooklyn produced by Don Corleon and Mad Cheeta to pay homage and respect for the 19th anniversary passing of The Notorious B.I.G. Kim's late mentor and her hometown Brooklyn. On March 10, 2016, Lil' Kim previewed a clean version of her Summer Sixteen freestyle by Drake on Funkmaster flex's interview. Lil' Kim released the dirty version of the Summer Sixteen freestyle on March 15. The mixtape was first announced on March 24, 2016, via her Instagram page. Lil' Kim did an interview with Billboard a few hours before her mixtape was released, telling Billboard that she stepped away from recording new songs to tend to her daughter Royal Reign. "For a long time, my focus was my baby", she says. "I wasn't thinking about music at all, and my focus was just raising my baby. Now that she's 19 months and she's going to be two this summer, she's motivating me to do music again."

== Critical reception ==
Lil Kim Season received mixed to positive reviews from critics. Jen Yamato a writer from The Daily Beast wrote, "If anything, Lil Kim Season indicates that Kim's got her sights set on returning in a big way—and that she's collecting collaborators who might help her achieve it."

== Track listing ==
No.	Title	Writer(s)	Original song(s)	Length
1.	"Fountain Bleu"		"Ran Off on da Plug Twice" by Plies	3:14
2.	"Cut It (Beemix)" (featuring TLz)		"Cut It" by O.T. Genasis	2:56
3.	"Blow a Check"		"Blow a Check" by Zoey Dollaz, Puff Daddy & French Montana	6:06
4.	"Summer Sixteen (Beemix)"		Summer Sixteen by Drake	2:05
5.	"Diego"		Diego by Tory Lanez	2:56
6.	"Work (Beemix)"		"Work" by Rihanna featuring Drake	3:42
7.	"#Mine" (featuring Kevin Gates)	Lil' Kim, Kevin Gilyard		3:28
8.	"I Did It for Brooklyn" (featuring Maino)			3:43
9.	"Panda" (featuring Maino, Tlz & Dash)		"Panda" by Desiigner	4:30
10.	"Im Dat Bitch"		"I'm Up by Omarion featuring French Montana & Kid Ink	2:09

Note

- The mixtape version of "#Mine" is shorter than the single version.

== Charts ==
The promotional single "#Mine" charted at number 20 on the Billboard Rap Digital Songs list and sold over 25,000 copies to date.
