= Ms. G.O.A.T. =

Mixtape by Lil' Kim
- Released: June 3, 2008
- Recorded: 2006–2008
- Genre: Hip hop
- Length: 62:16
- Label: Money Maker/Queen Bee
- Producers: Kimberly "Lil' Kim" Jones, Mister Cee, DJ Whoo Kid, Christian Rich

Lil' Kim chronology
The Naked Truth (2005)	Ms. G.O.A.T. (2008)	Black Friday (2011)

Ms. G.O.A.T. : Greatest Of All Time is the debut mixtape by American rapper Lil' Kim. Released June 3, 2008, Kim produced the recording alongside New York City DJs Mister Cee and DJ Whoo Kid. The title refers to the LL Cool J album G.O.A.T. (2000).

== Background ==
After claiming the desire to possess creative control and a subsequent departure from her previous major record label, Atlantic, Lil Kim began working on Ms. G.O.A.T. in October 2006. This also marked her first musical endeavor since her incarceration, and she was released in July 2006.

Lil Kim stated in an MTV interview: "I always wanted to do a mixtape... I used to see how 50 (Cent) used to do it so hard... Damn, it's not a lot of girls doing it." Ms. G.O.A.T. was her first independent release. Prior to the album's release, "Chillin' Tonight" received airplay on the radio. The album showcased new songs from Lil Kim, as well as several remixes she was working on. There are skits intermittently, and the album features collaborations with 50 Cent, Maino, a Brooklyn based rapper and Britney Spears, as well as several other Hip Hop stars. Lil' Kim also retaliates to Remy Ma on the track "I Get It", as part of a continuation of rivalry, and she pays homage to her heroes Lauryn Hill and MC Lyte through samples or thematics of "Mis-Education of Lil' Kim", which features the beat of "Lost Ones", a song from The Miseducation of Lauryn Hill, and "Hood News", respectively.

Lil' Kim performed the song "Chillin' Tonight" on the comedy-drama The Game, appearing as herself in the 2007 episode "Media Blitz". As part of promotion, Lil' Kim offered signed copies of Ms. G.O.A.T. in a contest, where fans would submit requests on who they would like to see her work with, as well as why she is the "Greatest of All Time".

== Reviews ==
Among critics, the mixtape has received generally positive reviews. It has been called a representation of Lil' Kim's return to the streets. Tito Salinas of All Hip Hop says "Lil' Kim shows that her time behind bars didn't rust all of her swag away" on Ms. G.O.A.T. On the other hand, Ehren Gresehover of New York Mag says that although one of the tracks "The Miseducation of Lil' Kim" is not bad, he wished that it was Lauryn Hill who was making a comeback instead.

== Track listing ==
Ms. G.O.A.T.
No.	Title	Length
1.	"Hood Newz: Lil' Kim Free"	1:14
2.	"Ms. G.O.A.T."	1:57
3.	"Mis-Education of Lil' Kim"	3:08
4.	"I Get It"	1:19
5.	"Wrath of Kim's Madness"	1:45
6.	"Chillin' Tonite"	4:19
7.	"Need a Bitch" (featuring Nate Dogg)	3:35
8.	"2 Hatin' Bitches (Skit)"	1:02
9.	"It's Kim Bitches (Get That Money)"	3:05
10.	"Fuck You"	3:54
11.	"Rock on Wit Yo Bad Self"	2:18
12.	"Queen Bitch 101" (featuring Christian Rich)	4:05
13.	"Kim Gets Deeper"	1:55
14.	"Wanna Lick (Magic Stick, Pt. 2)" (featuring 50 Cent)	3:20
15.	"Thang on Me" (featuring Maino and Sha Money XL)	4:02
16.	"It Ain't My Fault"	3:30
17.	"Kimmy More" (featuring Britney Spears)	3:48
18.	"Salute the Women of Hip Hop (Skit)"	1:11
19.	"Let It Go" (featuring Keyshia Cole and Missy Elliott)	3:53
20.	"Mr. Cee Speaks"	0:14
21.	"Freaky Gurl (Remix)" (featuring Gucci Mane)	4:37
22.	"Outro"	0:43
23.	"No One (Remix)" (featuring Alicia Keys)	3:22
Total length:		62:16
