= Lighters Up (Lil' Kim song) =

2005 song by Lil Kim

Single by Lil' Kim

from the album The Naked Truth
- Released: August 30, 2005
- Recorded: 2005
- Genre: East Coast hip hop; reggae; Gangsta rap
- Length: 4:25
- Label: Atlantic; Queen Bee
- Songwriters: Kimberly Jones, Scott Storch
- Producer: Scott Storch

Lil' Kim singles chronology
"Sugar (Gimme Some)" (2005)	"Lighters Up" (2005)	"Whoa" (2006)

"Lighters Up" is a single written and recorded by rapper Lil' Kim appearing as the first single from her fourth album, The Naked Truth. It was produced by her ex-boyfriend, record producer Scott Storch. The song has a similar tone to Damian Marley's "Welcome to Jamrock". It was released on August 30, 2005. The album was originally due to be released September 13, but was delayed until September 27 because Queen Bee Entertainment felt that sales would not hold with the single "Lighters Up". The single debuted at number 100 on the Billboard Hot 100, then quickly climbed up to number 31. The single had a moderate chart performance in the United Kingdom, peaking at number 12 on the UK Singles Chart.

In 2013, the song was voted the best Brooklyn anthem by MTV.

== Background ==
As the first single from the Naked Truth, the single did reasonably well, creating hype for the album. However, due to the late follow-up, along with little promotions, the single performed less well than previous singles by Lil' Kim. The song is about Kim cautioning people about the dangers and conditions of certain parts of Brooklyn. The video features cameo appearances by Mary J. Blige, Freddie Foxxx, her brother Chris and Maino.

There was also an official remix of the song featuring Tego Calderón. The song featured a new verse and ad-libs from Calderon, as well as a new intro from Kim, but no new verses from Kim. A limited edition CD single featuring this remix was given away with purchases of "The Naked Truth" album exclusively at Target.

The music video of the song starts with the chorus of the clean version of "Shut Up Bitch", which they say "Shut Up, Chick" instead. The video was directed by Kirk Fraser in New York City, peaked at #1 on BET 106 & Park.

Two versions of the song were released. The original, which features cities throughout the US and overseas during the hook, and another version titled "Lighters Up (Welcome To Brooklyn)", which features spots throughout Brooklyn during the hook.

Lauryn Hill wanted to feature on the song but due to label issues it never happened.

== Formats and track listings ==
- UK Promo CD
1. "Lighters Up" (Radio Edit) – 3:28
- European Promo CD
1. "Lighters Up" (Explicit Version) – 4:26
2. "Lighters Up" (Clean Radio Edit) – 3:28
3. "My Ni*#@s" (Bonus) – 4:14
- US Promo CD
1. Lighters Up (Amended) 4:06
2. Lighters Up (Explicit) 4:29
3. Lighters Up (Instrumental) 4:30
4. Lighters Up (Welcome To Brooklyn) (Amended) 4:30
5. Lighters Up (Welcome To Brooklyn) (Explicit) 4:28
- US Remix Promo CD
1. "Lighters Up" (Remix) (Radio Version) – 3:44
2. "Lighters Up" (Remix) (Explicit Version) – 3:44
3. "Lighters Up" (Remix) (Instrumental) – 3:39
4. "Lighters Up" (Remix) (Acapella) – 3:44
- Europe CD single
1. "Lighters Up" (Album Version) 4:22
2. "Lighters Up" (Remix) (Radio Version) – 3:44
- UK CD single
1. "Lighters Up" (Album Version) – 4:22
2. "Lighters Up" (Edit) – 3:30
- US Remix CD single
1. "Lighters Up" (Remix) (featuring Tego Calderon) – 3:44
- Maxi CD
1. "Lighters Up" (Radio Edit) (Explicit Version) – 3:28
2. "Lighters Up" (Remix) (Explicit Version) – 3:44
3. "Lighters Up" (Instrumental) – 3:28
4. "Came Back For You" (Non Album Track) – 4:20
5. Enhanced Video

== Credits and personnel ==
Credits for "Lighters Up" are taken from the singles liner notes.

=== Original ===
Recording

- Recorded at Hit Factory Criteria Recording Studios, Miami, FL & Sony Music Recording Studios, New York, NY
- Recorded by Wayne "The Brain" Allison and Dan The Man,

Personnel

- Vocals by Lil' Kim
- Written by K. Jones, S. Storch
- Produced by Scott Storch
- Bass and Guitar by Aaron Fishbein
- Mixed by Glen Marchese

=== Remix ===
Recording

- Recorded at Hit Factory Criteria Recording Studios, Miami, FL & Sony Music Recording Studios, New York, NY
- Recorded by Dan The Man
- Additional Recording at Circle House Studios, Miami, FL by Dominigo Ramon

Personnel

- Vocals by Lil' Kim, Tego Calderon
- Written by K. Jones, S. Storch, V. Carraway, T. Calderon
- Percussion by Ahmir "Questlove" Thompson
- Bass and Guitar by Aaron Fishbein
- Mixed by Glen Marchese
- Additional mixing by Dan The Man

== Charts ==
=== Weekly charts ===
Chart (2005)	Peak position
Finland (Suomen virallinen lista)	4
Germany (GfK)	22
Ireland (IRMA)	44
Scottish Singles Sales (Official Charts)	22
Sweden (Sverigetopplistan)	51
UK Singles (Official Charts)	12
UK Hip Hop/R&B (Official Charts)	3
US Billboard Hot 100	31
US Hot R&B/Hip-Hop Songs (Billboard)	9
US Hot Rap Songs (Billboard)	8
US Rhythmic Airplay (Billboard)	23

=== Year-end charts ===
Chart (2005)	Position
UK Urban (Music Week)	28
US R&B/Hip-Hop Songs (Billboard)	69
