= Black Friday (Lil' Kim mixtape) =

Mixtape by Lil' Kim
- Released: February 14, 2011
- Recorded: 2009–2011
- Genre: Hip hop
- Length: 75:06
- Label: I.R.S.

Lil' Kim chronology
Ms. G.O.A.T. (2008)	Black Friday (2011)	Hard Core (2014)

Black Friday is the second mixtape by American rapper Lil' Kim, released on February 14, 2011 through PayPal. The title track is a response to Nicki Minaj's song "Roman's Revenge". The mixtape also contains the track "Grindin' Makin' Money", a collaboration which features rappers Birdman and Nicki Minaj, which Kim claims ignited the feud between her and Minaj, as well as another diss song towards Minaj titled "Pissin' on 'Em".

== Background ==
The creation of this mixtape was inspired by Kim's feud with Nicki Minaj. The cover of the mixtape, featuring a decapitated Nicki Minaj, was a fan's idea. The mixtape's title is a play on Minaj's debut album Pink Friday. The music video for the title track was released on November 26, 2010.

== Critical reception ==
Black Friday was heavily panned by music critics. Kid Fury of Vibe described its content as "tragic shit" and commented that the mixtape "lacks consistency, edge, and originality". Slant Magazine's Huw Jones gave it one-and-a-half out of five stars and felt that its production lacks "originality". Jones also panned Lil Kim's lyrics and disses towards Minaj as "inane", writing that "there are some pert jabs dotted among the tactless insults, but for the most part, it's a senseless rant". Kazeem Famuyide of The Source wrote that "I know it's a dated name ... but I don't think it's that crazy as far as appealing to her hardcore fan base". Jozen Cummings of XXL wrote facetiously, "It's not that we refuse to pay for music, we'd just much rather have an option to not do it. If you force any price tag on us without giving us a decent amount of free music to sample from, we're scoffing at that $9.99".

== Track listing ==
The track listing for the mixtape was revealed by Rap-Up.

No.	Title	Length
1.	"Intro"	2:07
2.	"Pissin' On Em"	3:06
3.	"Champagne Poppin'" (featuring Wiz Khalifa)	4:23
4.	"Hustle Hard"	1:55
5.	"M.O.E."	2:55
6.	"Killin' Em" (featuring Fabolous)	3:21
7.	"6 Foot Tall"	3:56
8.	"Clap Clap" (I.R.S.)	3:47
9.	"Kimmy Girl" (featuring Keri Hilson)	2:12
10.	"Gimme Brain"	2:59
11.	"Cheatin'" (featuring Rihanna)	4:32
12.	"Exclusive Radio Interview"	16:16
13.	"Grindin' Makin' Money" (Birdman featuring Lil Kim and Nicki Minaj)	3:38
14.	"Racks"	2:53
15.	"Pussy Callin'" (featuring Lil Boosie)	3:13
16.	"Black Friday"	5:02
17.	"Faded" (featuring Red Café and Rick Ross)	3:38
18.	"IRS Freestyle"	4:19
19.	"Lights, Camera, Action"	2:08
20.	"Buy U Music" (featuring Keri Hilson)	2:46
Total length:		75:06
