= The Notorious K.I.M. =

Studio album by Lil' Kim
- Released: June 27, 2000
- Recorded: 1999–2000
- Studios: Compass Point (Nassau, Bahamas); Daddy's House (New York City); The Hit Factory (New York City); Mirror Image (New York City); Purple Dragon (Atlanta); Sound on Sound (New York City); Trans Continental (Orlando)
- Genre: Hip hop
- Length: 77:13
- Labels: Queen Bee; Undeas; Atlantic
- Producers: Deric "D-Dot" Angelettie; Carlos Broady; Sean "Puffy" Combs; Jerome "Knobody" Foster; Richard "Younglord" Frierson; Fury; Jay "Waxx" Garfield; Daniel Glogower; Darren "Limitless" Henson; Kimberly "Lil' Kim" Jones; Mas; Nashiem Myrick; Rated R; Rockwilder; Shaft; Kanye West; Mario "Yellowman" Winans

Lil' Kim chronology
Hard Core (1996)	The Notorious K.I.M. (2000)	La Bella Mafia (2003)

Singles from The Notorious K.I.M.
- 1. "No Matter What They Say" Released: June 13, 2000; 2. "How Many Licks?" Released: October 28, 2000

The Notorious K.I.M. is the second studio album by American rapper Lil' Kim. It was released on June 27, 2000, by Atlantic Records and was her first album on her new label Queen Bee Entertainment. It debuted at number four on the US Billboard 200 chart, selling 229,000 copies in its first week, achieving Lil' Kim's highest peak and biggest first-week sales, and reached the top of the Top R&B/Hip-Hop Albums chart. A commercial success, The Notorious K.I.M. was certified platinum by the Recording Industry Association of America (RIAA) on August 2, 2000. It was the best-selling female rap album in 2000 with sales of over 1.4 million copies in the United States. To date, The Notorious K.I.M. has sold 5.1 million copies worldwide.

The album spawned two singles that attained moderate Billboard chart success. Lead single "No Matter What They Say" peaked at number 60 on the US Billboard Hot 100 and number 15 on the Hot R&B/Hip-Hop Songs chart. The second single "How Many Licks?", featuring R&B artist Sisqó, performed similarly, reaching the bottom half of the Hot 100.

== Production and title ==
In a 1999 interview with BlackBook magazine, Kim stated that she was thinking about naming the album Queen Bitch, the title of a song from her debut album Hard Core, but decided against it as fellow rapper and friend Missy Elliott had used "She's a Bitch" and Kim did not want anybody being confused or thinking there was a problem between the two. In dedication to The Notorious B.I.G., The Notorious K.I.M. was in a "memorial" to the late rapper. "I felt Biggie's spirit while I was working on this album. I thought it was a perfect name for the album. Also, I am known in a notorious way, my style and lyrics. I've been known in a notorious way over the years", Kim told Jet magazine.

This album to me is more creative and more versatile than my last album. I think that's what people have been looking for. My whole image, to me, the reason why I came out with 'Hard Core,' the sexy thing, was to make me different from every other female rapper that was out. That's exactly what I'm trying to do now, is make myself different, because now we have a lot of rappers doing the same thing that I did when I came out the first time. What I'm trying to do is separate myself again from the rappers that are out now.

—Lil' Kim, MTV News

In a 2000 interview, Kim explained to MTV News that she attempted to collaborate with the original producers of Hard Core, but she was not satisfied with the final results. "Some of the producers that I worked with, they just didn't know what I wanted, so I worked with new producers this time, and I kind of told them what I wanted," Kim told MTV. Production for the album was handled primarily by Mario "Yellowman" Winans, Fury, Richard "Younglord" Frierson, Rated R, Rockwilder, Darren "Limitless" Henson, Shaft, Kanye West, and Timbaland.

== Artwork ==
The artwork used for the album was shot by David LaChapelle. The album cover was originally intended to be a picture of Kim nude and covered in Louis Vuitton logos, but the then editor-in-chief of Interview magazine, Ingrid Sischy, saw the picture at a gallery exhibit of LaChapelle's work and insisted that it be used for the magazine. Before the album's release, the image was used for the cover for the November 1999 issue of Interview.

== Delay ==
In the summer of 1999, 12 songs from The Notorious K.I.M. were widely available through Internet file-sharing services and bootleg outlets. As a result, Kim went back into the recording studio and recorded 11 songs in three weeks. The set's release was delayed from several scheduled dates – August 17 and November 9, 1999, and April 25, 2000 – due to bootlegging and legal problems involving her record label. In a statement to Entertainment Weekly, Kim explained, "I wanted to put out the best album possible for my fans, and I needed more time in the studio to do this." Sean "Puffy" Combs also explained, "I am a perfectionist and so is Kim, and we will only put out an album when it's right."

== Singles ==
The Notorious K.I.M. spawned two singles. The lead album's first single, "No Matter What They Say" made it to the bottom half on the US Billboard Hot 100 chart with a peak position of number 60, Kim's least-successful single at that time. It reached number 15 on the Hot R&B/Hip-Hop Songs chart, number 6 on the Hot Rap Tracks chart, and number 35 on the UK Singles Chart. The second single from the album, "How Many Licks?", featured Sisqó, and underquoted this success with peak positions of numbers 75 and 36, respectively, on the Hot 100 and Hot R&B/Hip-Hop Songs. A third single, "Hold On", featuring Mary J. Blige was serviced to US radio only.

== Critical reception ==
Professional ratings
Review scores
Source	Rating
AllMusic	2.5/5 stars
Robert Christgau	(dud)
Entertainment Weekly	B+
NME	8/10
RapReviews	7.5/10
Rolling Stone	3/5 stars
Slant Magazine	3/5 stars
The Source	3.5/5 stars
USA Today	3/4 stars

The Notorious K.I.M. received mixed to positive reviews from most professional music critics. Slant Magazine critic Sal Cinquemani comments that the album "combines essential hip-hop elements – sex, guns, drugs, and cash – with a strange sense of vulnerability," and states her song "Hold On" is a "touching tribute to the late rapper". Cinquemani states "despite ventures into solemn territory and gangsta rap, the album continues down Kim's path of female sexual liberation." Entertainment Weekly journalist Tom Sinclair gave the album a B+, stating "The Notorious K.I.M.'s barrage of aural sex is complemented by strong, often lush production, and surprisingly witty samples and interpolations. Devon Powers of PopMatters called the album "overdone", stating "what Kim has overdone on this album is the camp – she's almost become a caricature of herself" and says "even her props to Biggie lose their sentimentality for being too easily commercial and convenient".

In the AllMusic review for the album, Jason Birchmeier stated that "Biggie had played a large role in the success of Hard Core, and his absence here is gaping." Jam Music critic Mike Ross stated that the album "failed to live up to its hype". Rolling Stone journalist Rob Sheffield gave the album 3 stars, called the album "too weak and retro", and also said that the vocal samples of The Notorious B.I.G. "just make you mourn the man and his moment, neither of which is ever coming back." Despite the album's flaws, critics remained impressed with her raunchy lyrics and attitude. Sheffield states "Lil' Kim still has an admirably tough and nasty mouth on her, and it's good to hear a Queen Bee sting.

== Commercial performance ==
The Notorious K.I.M. debuted atop the US Billboard's Top R&B/Hip-Hop Albums chart, and at number four on the Billboard 200, with first-week sales of 235,000 copies – almost triple the sales of Lil' Kim's debut album, Hard Core (1996), which sold 78,000 copies. The album ultimately spent a little over 25 weeks on that chart. While it became Kim's first album to reach the top of the Top R&B/Hip-Hop Albums chart, it also scored her her highest peak position on the Billboard 200. Due to the success of the number-one single "Lady Marmalade" (which featured Mýa, Pink, and Christina Aguilera), the album re-entered the Billboard 200 on June 1, 2001 for another 12 weeks, accumulating a total of 37 weeks on the chart. The album was certified platinum by the Recording Industry Association of America (RIAA) on August 2, 2000, and as of October 2007, it had sold over 1,416,000 copies in the United States.

Elsewhere, the album opened at number 67 on the UK Albums Chart and spent 11 weeks on the charts. It also peaked at number 70 in France and number 85 in Netherlands. In Canada, it debuted at number 11 and spent eight weeks on the RPM Top Albums/CDs chart. In July 2001, it received a gold certification by the Canadian Recording Industry Association (CRIA). As of July 2016, The Notorious K.I.M. had sold 5.1 million copies worldwide.

== Track listing ==
No.	Title	Writer(s)	Producer(s)	Length
1.	"Lil' Drummer Boy" (featuring Cee-Lo of Goodie Mob and Redman)	Kimberly Jones; Thomas Burton; Mario Winans; Reggie Noble	Sean "Puffy" Combs; Mario "Yellowman" Winans	4:31
2.	"Custom Made (Give It to You)"	K. Jones; Nick Loftin; Daniel Glogower; Marvin Burns	Fury; Glogower^{[a]}	3:06
3.	"Who's Number One?"	K. Jones; Richard Frierson; Frank Wilson; Anita Poree; Leonard Caston Jr.	Richard "Younglord" Frierson; Jerome "Knobody" Foster	4:13
4.	"Suck My Dick"	K. Jones; Ray Salas; Combs; Andru Donalds; Norman Glover; Joan Morgan; Shirley Murdock; Carl Thompson; Roger Troutman; Larry Troutman; Christopher Wallace	Rated R; Mas	4:03
5.	"Single Black Female" (featuring Mario "Yellowman" Winans)	K. Jones; Winans; Sade Adu; Martin Ditcham	Winans	4:14
6.	"Revolution" (featuring Grace Jones and Lil' Cease)	K. Jones; Winans; Combs	Winans; Combs	4:54
7.	"How Many Licks?" (featuring Sisqó)	K. Jones; Winans; Combs	Winans; Combs	3:43
8.	"Notorious KIM" (featuring The Notorious B.I.G.)	K. Jones; Dana Stinson	Rockwilder	3:39
9.	"No Matter What They Say"	K. Jones; Darren Henson; José Feliciano; Eric B. & Rakim; Edward Archer; Jackey Beavers; Jack C. Hill; Preston Joyner; Dennis Taylor; Howard Thompson; Nile Rodgers; Bernard Edwards	Darren "Limitless" Henson	4:16
10.	"She Don't Love You"	K. Jones; Klen Raphael; Michael Jones	Shaft	3:31
11.	"Queen Bitch Pt. 2" (featuring Puff Daddy)	K. Jones; Nashiem Myrick; Carlos Broady; Jay Garfield	Myrick; Broady; Jay "Waxx" Garfield	3:58
12.	"Don't Mess with Me"	K. Jones; Kanye West; Deric Angelettie; Cliff Wade; Geoff Gill	West; Deric "D-Dot" Angelettie^{[a]}	4:48
13.	"Do What You Like" (featuring Junior M.A.F.I.A.)	K. Jones; Raphael; James Lloyd; Antoine Spain; Jamel Fisher	Shaft	5:16
14.	"Off the Wall" (featuring Lil' Cease)	K. Jones; Winans; Combs	Winans; Combs	4:05
15.	"Right Now" (featuring Carl Thomas)	K. Jones; Raphael; Suzanne Vega; Vaughan Mason	Shaft	2:32
16.	"Aunt Dot" (featuring Lil' Shanice)	K. Jones; Winans	Winans	5:25
17.	"Hold On" (featuring Mary J. Blige)	K. Jones; Blige; Myrick; T-Bone Walker	Myrick	6:06
18.	"I'm Human"	K. Jones; Thomas; Winans	Winans	4:25

=== Notes ===
- ^{^[a]} signifies a co-producer

=== Sample credits ===
- "Custom Made (Give It to You)" contains a sample of "French Kiss" by Lil Louis.
- "Who's Number One?" contains a sample of "Keep on Truckin'" by Eddie Kendricks.
- "Suck My Dick" contains excerpts and a sample of "Me & My Bitch" by The Notorious B.I.G.
- "Notorious KIM" features uncredited vocals from The Notorious B.I.G.
- "Single Black Female" contains a sample of "The Sweetest Taboo" by Sade.
- "No Matter What They Say" contains samples of "Esto Es el Guaguanco" by Cheo Feliciano, "I Know I Got Soul" by Eric B. & Rakim, "I Got It Made" by Special Ed, and "Rapper's Delight" by The Sugarhill Gang.
- "She Don't Love You" contains an interpolation of "Betcha She Don't Love You" by Evelyn King.
- "Don't Mess with Me" contains a sample of "Heartbreaker" by Pat Benatar and "Big Yellow Taxi" by Joni Mitchell.
- "Right Now" contains a sample of "Break for Love" by Vaughn Mason and an interpolation of "Tom's Diner" by Suzanne Vega.
- "Hold On" contains a sample of "Stormy Monday" by Willie Hutch.

== Personnel ==
- Hillary Weston – A&R, associate executive producer
- Lynn Kowalewski – art direction, design
- Dominick Mancuso – assistant engineer
- Lynn Montrose – assistant engineer
- Ben Allen – Pro-Tools engineer
- Jimmie Lee Patterson – Pro-tools engineer
- Marc Pfafflin – Pro-tools engineer
- Michael Patterson – Pro-tools engineer
- Roger Che – Pro-tools engineer
- Stephen Dent – Pro-tools engineer
- Christopher "Notorious B.I.G." Wallace – executive producer
- Kimberly "Lil' Kim" Jones – executive producer, primary artist
- Sean "Puffy" Combs – executive producer
- Damion "D-Roc" Butler – associate executive producer
- Chris Athens – mastering
- David LaChapelle – photography
- Joi L. Brown – product manager

== Charts ==
=== Weekly charts ===
Weekly chart performance for The Notorious K.I.M.
Chart (2000–2001)	Peak position
Canada Top Albums/CDs (RPM)	11
Canadian R&B Albums (Nielsen SoundScan)	15
Dutch Albums (Album Top 100)	85
French Albums (SNEP)	70
German Albums (Offizielle Top 100)	76
Swiss Albums (Schweizer Hitparade)	100
UK Albums (Official Charts)	67
UK R&B Albums (Official Charts)	11
US Billboard 200	4
US Top R&B/Hip-Hop Albums (Billboard)	1

=== Year-end charts ===
Year-end chart performance for The Notorious K.I.M.
Chart (2000)	Position
US Billboard 200	89
US Top R&B/Hip-Hop Albums (Billboard)	29

Chart (2001)	Position
Canadian Rap Albums (Nielsen SoundScan)	58
Canadian R&B Albums (Nielsen SoundScan)	111

=== Decade-end charts ===
Decade-end chart performance for The Notorious K.I.M.
Chart (2000–2009)	Position
US Top R&B/Hip-Hop Albums (Billboard)	100

== Certifications ==
Certifications for The Notorious K.I.M.
Region	Certification	Certified units/sales
Canada (Music Canada)	Gold	50,000^{^}
United States (RIAA)	Platinum	1,416,000
^{^} Shipments figures based on certification alone.
