= Tiffany Foxx =

American rapper

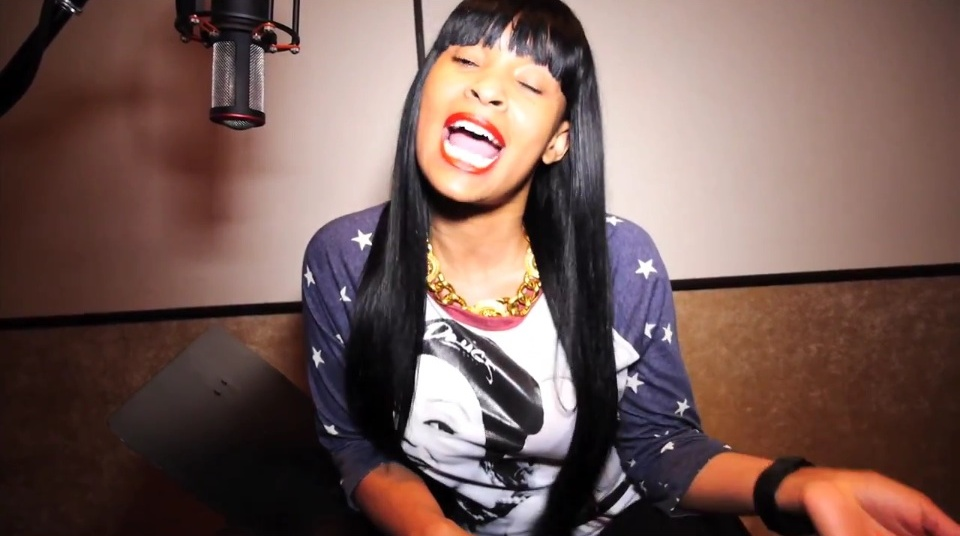
- Foxx in 2013

Background information
- Born: Tiffany Parham; November 27, 1979 (age 46); St. Louis, Missouri, U.S.
- Genre: Hip hop
- Occupations: Rapper; songwriter; model
- Instrument: Vocals
- Years active: 2005–present
- Labels: Queen Bee Entertainment; Mizay Entertainment
- Website: www.1tiffanyfoxx.com

Tiffany Stannell Parham, known professionally as Tiffany Foxx, is an American rapper. Born in St. Louis, Missouri, Foxx first gained recognition in 2005 after appearing on Snoop Dogg's compilation album Welcome to tha Chuuch: Da Album. In 2010, she formed a hip-hop group "June 5th". They released the mixtape HERstory before Foxx decided to pursue a solo career.

In 2012, rapper Lil' Kim signed Foxx to her record label International Rock Star Records. Since then she has released three mixtapes, Yellow Tape, Goal Diggers and King Foxx. She also appeared in the fourth season of the VH1 reality show Love & Hip Hop: Atlanta. In 2017, Foxx appeared on Season 2 Episode 7 of WE TV dating show Million Dollar Matchmaker with Patti Stanger.

== Career ==
=== 2009–11: June 5 ===
"June 5" was a female rap group from St. Louis, Missouri formed in 2009 signed under Mizay Entertainment. Foxx, Scar Ladon and Brooke Holladay met on June 5, 2009. Foxx stated “When we first came together we met because we were all in the business, So we joined forces on June 5th and became the group June 5th.” On March 24, 2010, June 5 released their first mixtape called, HERstory.

=== 2012–present: Solo career ===
In 2012, rapper Lil' Kim signed Foxx to her label, International Rock Star Records. Together, the two have released two songs, "Twisted" and "Jay-Z", both of which have accompanying music videos. In the music video for "Twisted", Miley Cyrus supported her friends Lil' Kim and Foxx by appearing in the music video.

On October 15, 2013, Foxx appeared on the BET Hip Hop Awards BET cypher. On Christmas Day, Foxx revealed the artwork for her upcoming mixtape titled King Foxx which was released on Valentine's Day. Foxx also joined the cast of VH1's Love & Hip Hop: Atlanta, which premiered on April 20, 2015.

In 2018, Foxx released singles "War Zone" and "If I Do It" which were included in her upcoming album.

On November 21, 2018, Tiffany Foxx released Bad Bitch Commandments.

== Discography ==
=== Mixtapes ===
Title	Album details	Ref
HERstory	Released: March 24, 2010; Label: Mizay Entertainment; Formats digital download	
Yellow Tape	Released: October 30, 2012; Label: I.R.S Records; Formats: digital download	
Goal Diggers	Released: May 27, 2013; Label: I.R.S Records; Formats: digital download	
King Foxx	Released: June 16, 2014; Label: I.R.S Records; Formats: digital download	
Bad Bitch Commandments	Released: November 21, 2018; Label: Independent; Formats: digital download	

=== Promotional singles ===
List of promotional singles, with other performing artists, showing year released and album name
Title	Year	Other artist(s)	Album
"Let's Run Away" Executive Produced by Tony Hanson & Twin-P Ramazani - The Ra-Twins Agency / Fenix Studios	2014	Murda Mook	Single-only release
"Where This Light Goes" Executive Produced by Tony Hanson & Twin-P Ramazani - The Ra-Twins Agency / Fenix Studios	2014	Teairra Marí, Angelina Pivarnick & Amoretta	Single-only release
"If I Do It" Produced by Vega Heartbreak and Bradd Young	2018		Single-only release
"War Zone" Produced by Street Symphony	2018		Single-only release

=== Guest appearances ===
List of non-single guest appearances, with other performing artists, showing year released and album name
Title	Year	Other artist(s)	Album
"Shake That"	2005	Snoop Dogg	Bigg Snoop Dogg Presents...Welcome to tha Chuuch: Da Album
"Can't Find My Panties"	2005	–	Bigg Snoop Dogg Presents...Welcome to tha Chuuch: Da Album
"I'm Out Here"	2012	G.Vega$, Veto	The Super Group - Power
"Dessert"	2012	JLS	Evolution
"Boss Bitch"	2012	Shawty Lo, Lola Monroe, Jai Jai	Million Dollar Man
"Cheat on My Bitch"	2012	Genesis	Black Belt
"Bunkin'"	2012	Big Kuntry King	100%
"Pretty Girl Twerk"	2013	Kstylis, Nelly	Single-only release
"Shake Something"	2013	Cali Swag District, Problem	Single-only release
"Bet It"	2014	Zaytoven	Zaytown Sorority
"Two Rings"	2014	V-Nasty	Zaytown Sorority
"Pussy"	2014	Freez	Single-only release
"Tiffany"	2014	Laudie	Girl Talk
"I'm Just Sayin' (STL Remix)"	2014	JR, Nelly	Single-only release
"Way 4 Dat"	2017	Jung Coasta	No Days Off
"Unfair"	2017	Zaytoven	Zaytown Sorority, Vol. 2

== Videography ==
=== Solo – Music videos ===
Year	Title	Director	Ref
2012	"Jay Z" (feat. Lil' Kim)	Picture Perfect	
2012	"Twisted" (feat. Lil' Kim)	Jonathan Andrade	
2013	"Goal Diggers" (feat. Fast Life)	Picture Perfect	
2013	"Jelly Bean"	Rich Greene	
2013	"On Set"	The Media Lab	
2014	"Bet It"	Zay, AL and Roe	
2014	"Renegade"	Rich Greene	
2014	"Fuk U Thought"	Todd Uno	
2014	"Goal Digger" (feat. Tracy T)		
2014	"Where This Light Goes" (feat. Teairra Mari, Angelina Pivarnick and Amoretta)	Tony Hanson	
2018	"War Zone"	House Of Shoots	

=== Featured artist – Music videos ===
List of Tiffany music videos, showing year released and director
Year	Title	Artist	Director	Ref
2006	"Shake That"	Snoop Dogg	Calvin Broadus	
2010	"Dollaz"	June 5	Nelly	
2012	"Im Out Here"	G.Vega$, Veto	Rich Greene	
2012	"Boss Bitch"	Shawty Lo, Lola Monroe, Jai Jai	GT Films	
2014	"Double Cup (Remix)"	DJ Infamous, Ace Hood, Yo Gotti, Kirko Bangz, Snootie Wild, Jim Jones	Stevie Rodriguez	

== Filmography ==
=== Films ===
Year	Title	Role
2013	Birds Of A Feather	Herself

=== Television ===
Year	Title	Role
2015	Love & Hip Hop: Atlanta	Herself
2017	Million Dollar Matchmaker	Herself

=== Commercials ===
List of commercials, showing year released, company/product, director and description
Year	Company/product	Director	Description
Commercials
2013	BET Hip Hop Awards	N/A	Promoting herself for the bet hip hop cypher.
