= Whoa (Lil' Kim song) =

Single by Lil' Kim

from the album The Naked Truth
- B-side: "Spell Check"
- Released: February 7, 2006
- Recorded: 2005
- Genre: Hip hop
- Length: 4:25
- Label: Atlantic, Queen Bee
- Songwriters: Kimberly Jones, Johnathan Rotem
- Producer: J. R. Rotem

Lil' Kim singles chronology
"Lighters Up" (2005)	"Whoa" (2006)	"Let It Go" (2007)

"Whoa" is the second single from the album The Naked Truth by rapper Lil' Kim which is produced by J. R. Rotem. "Whoa" never made it to the Billboard Hot 100 but charted on the Billboard Bubbling Under Hot 100 for five weeks peaking at number 4. Also, the single made it to the R&B/Hip-Hop Tracks chart, where it peaked at number 30. Originally sent to US radio on November 22, 2005, it was then re-released in February to coincide with the airing of her reality show, Lil' Kim: Countdown to Lockdown, for which it served as the theme song. It was released in the United Kingdom on May 15, 2006.

Before the album was released, some versions of the "Lighters Up" promo CD and vinyl listed the title of the song as "My Ni*#@s". Due to the lyrics in the second verse, Whoa is heard as a Junior M.A.F.I.A. diss.

== Music video ==
The music video, directed by Kirk Fraserm, was shot in New York City in 2005 prior to her arrest. "Whoa" premiered on 106 & Park on February 16, 2006.

The video begins with Kim, her friend/ co-defendant Moe and Zab Judah riding in a car talking. Once the first verse starts, one scene features Kim in a museum with a drink while looking at artwork. In another scene Kim is seen dodging laser beams and hiding from security. By the second verse Kim has stolen a painting and is seen escaping. Meanwhile, police ask friends of Kim to leave. By the second chorus Kim is seen returning to the car from the start of the video. Shortly after the song fades into another song "Spell Check" which in one scene Kim is singing the song in front of her car, and in another scene she is seen being forced out of her car and the painting she stole is being returned. At the end the police throw kim in the back of a police truck in an orange suit. The song sharply ends and large text appears that says COMING HOME SOON.

The video for song "Stomp" by Maino, featuring Lil' Kim, starts off where the Whoa video finishes, with Maino breaking Kim out of the police truck.

== Formats and track listings ==
- UK Promo CD
1. "Whoa" (Amended Radio Edit) – 3:36
2. "Whoa" (Instrumental) – 4:13
- US/European Promo CD
1. "Whoa" (Radio Version) – 4:15
2. "Whoa" (Video Version) – 4:15
3. "Whoa" (Explicit Version) – 4:14
4. "Whoa" (Instrumental) – 4:12
- US Whoa/Spell Check Promo CD
1. "Whoa" (Radio Version) – 4:15
2. "Whoa" (Video Version) – 4:15
3. "Whoa" (Explicit Version) – 4:14
4. "Whoa" (Instrumental) – 4:12
5. "Spell Check" (Radio Version) – 3:37
6. "Spell Check" (Explicit Version) – 3:37
7. "Spell Check" (Instrumental) – 3:37
- UK CD1
1. "Whoa" (Explicit Album Version) – 4:10
2. "Whoa" (Josh Harris Radio Edit) – 3:45
- UK CD2
1. "Whoa" (Explicit Album Version) – 4:10
2. "Whoa" (Josh Harris Radio Edit) – 3:45
3. "Whoa" (Video)
4. "Whoa" (MyTone Ringtone)
- DJ Exclusive Remixes Promo CD
1. "Whoa" (E Smoove Dub) – 8:15
2. "Whoa" (True Visionary Extended Club) – 4:36
3. "Whoa" (Pull Club Mix) – 6:28
4. "Whoa" (Album Version) – 4:17
5. "Whoa" (Instrumental) – 4:13
6. "Lighters Up" (Josh Harris Club Mix) – 6:13
7. "Lighters Up" (Hani Num Club) – 7:38

== Credits and personnel ==
- Recorded by Dan The Man
- Written by K. Jones, J. Rotem, D. Miller, S. Monty.
- Produced by J. R. Rotem
- Mixed by Glen Marchese

== Charts ==
Chart (2006)	Peak position
Scottish Singles Sales (Official Charts)	50
UK Singles (Official Charts)	43
UK Hip Hop/R&B (Official Charts)	8
US Bubbling Under Hot 100 Singles (Billboard)	4
US Hot R&B/Hip-Hop Songs (Billboard)	30
