= Nasty One =

Single by Lil' Kim
- Released: July 11, 2018
- Recorded: 2017
- Genre: Hip hop; dancehall
- Length: 3:33
- Label: eOne; Queen Bee Entertainment
- Songwriter(s): Kimberly Jones; Brandon Korn
- Producer(s): Bkorn

Lil' Kim singles chronology
"Wake Me Up" (2017)	"Nasty One" (2018)	"Go Awff" (2019)

Music video
- "Nasty One" on YouTube

"Nasty One" is a song recorded by American rapper Lil' Kim. The song was released on July 11, 2018 by Queen Bee Entertainment and eOne. A remix featuring Jamaicans singers Kranium and HoodCelebrityy and English rapper Stefflon Don was released on October 26, 2018.

== Background and composition ==
During an interview with Billboard, Jones described the song as a "happy medium" record that she want in her music, saying: "Things change, and I want to give my fans what I did and little bit of something new. And another thing too: my fans have seen me on some hardcore shit. They've seen me on some gutter 'I'm a gangstress, I will shoot yo ass if you play me or you steal from me.' They've seen that. I've done that. And last but not least... I've lived that. So it's like, let's see another side of Kim. Why not? Let's see a fun side, a sexy side." The song samples the 1989 song “When I See You Smile” by Bad English.

== Music video ==
On July 31, 2018, the music video leaked on Music Choice. On August 1, it exclusively premiered on Complex.

== Release history ==
Region	Release date	Version	Format	Label	Ref.
Various	July 11, 2018	Original	Digital download	Queen Bee Entertainment; eOne	
Various	October 26, 2018	Remix	Digital download	Queen Bee Entertainment; eOne	
