= No Matter What They Say =

Single by Lil' Kim

from the album The Notorious K.I.M.
- Released: May 30, 2000
- Recorded: 2000
- Genre: Latin · hip hop
- Length: 4:17
- Label: Queen Bee; Atlantic
- Songwriters: Kimberly Jones; Darren Henson; José Feliciano; Eric B. & Rakim; Edward Archer; Jackey Beavers; Jack C. Hill; Preston Joyner; Dennis Taylor; Howard Thompson; Nile Rodgers; Bernard Edwards
- Producer: Darren "Limitless" Henson

Lil' Kim singles chronology
"Notorious B.I.G." (1999)	"No Matter What They Say" (2000)	"How Many Licks?" (2000)

"No Matter What They Say" is a song by Lil' Kim from her second album The Notorious K.I.M. (2000). It was released as the lead single from the album on May 30, 2000 by Atlantic Records and Queen Bee Entertainment.

A moderate commercial success, "No Matter What They Say" reached number 60 on the US Billboard Hot 100 and number 35 on the UK Singles Chart.

== Background and composition ==
"No Matter What They Say" was not Kim's first choice as the lead single from the album. Kim did not want the song released as she felt the Spanish sound had already been done so many times due to the Latin pop explosion of the late 90s. Instead Kim wanted "The Queen", one of the songs that leaked prior to the album's release, as her first single. The record label didn't agree with Kim and insisted on releasing "No Matter What They Say". With time running out and not wanting her first week album sales to suffer, Kim agreed with her label to release the song. "The Queen" never made it on the album's final track listing. "Bad Girls" was another track that was leaked but Kim re-used the first verse for the lead single.

The song is a Latin and hip hop track with a latin rhythm based around the main sample of "Esto es el Guaguanco" by Cheo Feliciano. It has influences of tropical and East Coast hip hop. During the bridge, there's a breakdown chopping up the latin sample into a hip hop beat sampling multiple old-school hip hop songs such as "I Got It Made" by Special Ed, "I Know You Got Soul" by Eric B. & Rakim, and "Rapper's Delight" by The Sugarhill Gang.

The song interpolates the line "This is how it should be done" from Roxanne's On A Roll by Roxanne Shante.

== Music video ==
The accompanying music video for "No Matter What They Say" was filmed in Los Angeles and directed by Marcus Raboy in early June 2000. It features cameo appearances from Puff Daddy, Mary J. Blige, Missy Elliott, Method Man & Redman, Xzibit, Junior M.A.F.I.A. and Carmen Electra. The video needed some digital retouches, such was "nipple fixes" for when Kim wiggles out of her Versace bustiers and computer-edited T-shirts for her backup girls (they were altered to "itty girls"). Cameo dancer Carmen Electra had her underwear altered as well. "It's not like you could really see anything. It's just the freeze-frame factor you have to consider", said director Marcus Raboy. The music video premiered on Total Request Live (TRL) on June 20, 2000.

== Track listings ==
- US Promo CD
1. "No Matter What They Say" (Radio Edit) - 4:19
2. "No Matter What They Say" (Album Version) - 5:35
3. "No Matter What They Say" (Instrumental) - 4:21
- Europe CD single
1. "No Matter What They Say" (Radio Edit) - 4:18
2. "No Matter What They Say" (Album Version) - 4:14
3. "No Matter What They Say" (Instrumental) - 4:19
4. "No Matter What They Say" (Acappella) - 4:26

== Credits and personnel ==
Credits for "No Matter What They Say" are taken from the single's liner notes.

Recording

- Recorded at Daddy's House Recording Studios.
- Recorded by Stephen Dent

Personnel

- Lil' Kim – lead vocals
- K. Jones, D. Henson, J. Feliciano, Eric B. & Rakim, E. Archer, R. Beavers, J. Hill, P. Jovner, D. Taylor, H. Thomas, N. Rodgers, B. Edwards – songwriting
- Darren "Limitless" Henson – producer
- Rich Travali – mixing
- Chris Athens – audio mastering

== Charts ==
=== Weekly charts ===
Weekly chart performance for "No Matter What They Say"
Chart (2000)	Peak position
Scotland Singles (OCC)	68
UK Singles (OCC)	35
UK Dance (OCC)	19
UK Hip Hop/R&B (OCC)	3
US Billboard Hot 100	60
US Hot R&B/Hip-Hop Songs (Billboard)	15
US Hot Rap Songs (Billboard)	6
US Rhythmic Airplay (Billboard)	36

=== Year-end charts ===
Year-end chart performance for "No Matter What They Say"
Chart (2000)	Position
US Hot Rap Songs (Billboard)	74

== Release history ==
Release dates and formats for "No Matter What They Say"
Region	Date	Format(s)	Label(s)	Ref.
United States	May 30, 2000	Rhythmic contemporary radio; urban contemporary radio	Atlantic; Queen Bee	
United Kingdom	August 21, 2000	12-inch vinyl; cassette; maxi CD	East West	
