= The Naked Truth (Lil' Kim album) =

Studio album by Lil' Kim
- Released: September 27, 2005
- Length: 76:31
- Labels: Queen Bee; Atlantic
- Producers: Big Hill; Kevin "Khao" Cates; Channel 7; Dan The Man; Fredwreck; Jeekyman; Terrance "Hot Runner" Lovelace; Mr. Porter; Mista Raja; Red Spyda; J.R. Rotem; Scott Storch; Michael "Mr. Williams" Williams

Lil' Kim chronology
La Bella Mafia (2003)	The Naked Truth (2005)	Ms. G.O.A.T. (2008)

Singles from The Naked Truth
- 1. "Lighters Up" Released: July 10, 2005; 2. "Whoa" Released: February 7, 2006

The Naked Truth is the fourth studio album by American rapper Lil' Kim, released on September 27, 2005. The album was released the same week she started her year-long prison sentence for perjury and it was her last studio album released by Queen Bee Entertainment and Atlantic Records before deciding to part ways in 2008. Two official singles were released from the album: "Lighters Up" as the lead single, released in September 2005, and "Whoa", as the second and final single, in February 2006. The Naked Truth remains the only album by a female rapper to be rated five mics by The Source.

== Singles ==
The first single taken from the album was "Lighters Up". It was released on September 13, 2005, and was a moderate success, peaking at number 31 on the Billboard Hot 100. The second, and final, single from the album was "Whoa". Released on February 7, 2006, it was less successful than its predecessor and failed to make the Hot 100. It did manage to chart in the UK, peaking at number 43.

=== Promotional singles ===
The first promo single taken from the album was "Shut Up Bitch". For the release the title was censored to "Shut Up". Released to radio on July 12, 2005, the song served as a promotional single for the album and peaked at number 73 on the Billboard Hot R&B/Hip-Hop Songs chart. It can be heard at the start of the "Lighters Up" music video. The second promo single was "Spell Check". It was released to US radio as a promo single for the album in December 2005, alongside "Whoa". The song was promoted in the music video for "Whoa" with Kim rapping the first verse and chorus near the end.

== Critical reception ==
Professional ratings
Aggregate scores
Source	Rating
Metacritic	66/100
Review scores
Source	Rating
AllMusic	2/5 stars
Blender	4/5 stars
Entertainment Weekly	B−
Pitchfork	7.8/10
PopMatters	9/10 stars
Rolling Stone	3/5 stars
Slant Magazine	2.5/5 stars
The Source	5/5 stars
Stylus Magazine	D−
Vibe	5/5 stars

The album received generally positive reviews. At Metacritic, which assigns a rated mean out of 100 from mainstream critics, the album received a score of 66. In a rare 5 star-ratings, The Source declared The Naked Truth a "fitting title for the superior album that longtime Lil' Kim fans always knew she had in her," while Joan Morgan, writing for The Village Voice, called it Lil' Kim's "finest album" yet as well as "an easy contender for best rap record of the year." Vibe magazine's Rondell Conway wrote about the album: "With scathing lyricism and infectious beats, Truth validates the Queen Bee's position as the definitive rap vixen." Blender magazine gave the album four stars, calling it her "strongest work since her pheromone-thick 1996 debut." Rating the album 9/10, PopMatters wrote: "All in all, The Naked Truth is a great musical and lyrical effort, as well as a timely response to the media and the peanut gallery. Anybody out there wondering if Kim has the chops to stay in the game should be satisfied now."

Pitchfork journalist Jess Harvell, who gave the album a positive 7.8 rating, stated, "The Naked Truth may be better than 80% of the other rap albums to be released in 2005, but that doesn't make it another Ready to Die." Nathan Rabin from The A.V. Club found that The Naked Truth "could benefit from judicious cutting, but for its superior first half at least, it boasts the intimacy of a diary entry and the urgency of a kite sent straight out the penitentiary." Rolling Stone critic Peter Relic felt that The Naked Truth "may be a convincing act of bravado, but it isn't the whole story [...] The vulnerability behind that mask is what's missing here; if she could articulate it, she might have a true classic." Entertainment Weekly's Michael Endelman noted that the album "finds the pint-size fashionista tackling subjects beyond her typical raunchy raps and odes to conspicuous consumption. Her very-real-life drama has inspired some of her most focused work [...] and also some of her worst."

Sal Cinquemani, writing for Slant Magazine, found that "the preemptively defensive album's biggest problem is that it's surely nowhere near as interesting as its yet-to-be-recorded post-slammer follow-up will be." Less impressed, Kelefa Sanneh from The New York Times called The Naked Truth a "surprisingly dull album, with too many stale conceits and run-of-the-mill beats. Somehow, an avatar of gaudy overkill has fallen victim to an unlikely weakness: underkill." Andy Kellman from AllMusic rated the album two out ot five stars. He wrote: "Hopefully, Kim's year away will leave her refreshed and ready to make a return album that's as exciting and as colorful as Hard Core or La Bella Mafia. This one's a meandering drag." Thomas Inskeep from Stylus Magazine called the album "uninspired" and "calculated" and concluded:"If this is The Naked Truth, she needs to put some clothes on; this is one of 2005’s most thudding disappointments."

== Commercial performance ==
The Naked Truth debuted at number six on the US Billboard 200 and at number three on the Top R&B/Hip-Hop Albums chart, selling 109,000 copies in its first week. By January 2008, it had sold 394,000 copies domestically.

== Track listing ==
No.	Title	Writer(s)	Producer	Length
1.	"Intro"	Dan Humiston	Dan The Man; Big Hill	0:39
2.	"Spell Check"	Kimberly Jones; Andy Thelusma; Bernard Edwards; Nile Rogers; Christopher Wallace; Mason Betha; Sean Combs; Steven Jordan	Red Spyda	3:39
3.	"Lighters Up"	Jones; Scott Storch; Victor Carraway	Scott Storch	4:23
4.	"Shut Up Bitch Intro"			0:56
5.	"Shut Up Bitch"	Jones; Michael "Mr. Williams" Williams; Roger Greene	Williams; Mista Raja	4:19
6.	"Whoa"	Jones; J. R. Rotem	Rotem	4:08
7.	"Slippin'"	Jones; Denaun Porter	Mr. Porter	4:16
8.	"Answering Machine Skit 1"			2:27
9.	"All Good"	Jones; Wallace; Darrin Lockings; James Mtume; Jean-Claude Olivier; Combs	Jeekyman	4:31
10.	"I Know You See Me" (featuring Tiny)	Jones; Kevin "Khao" Cates; Tony Hester	Cates	3:53
11.	"W.P.I.M.P. Skit"		Dan The Man	0:30
12.	"Quiet" (featuring The Game)	Jones; Williams; Greene	Williams; Mista Raja	4:02
13.	"Durty"	Jones; Keith Johnson; Martha Velez; Millie Jackson; Randy Klein; Terrance "Hot Runner" Lovelace	Lovelace	4:10
14.	"Answering Machine Skit 2"			2:23
15.	"We Don't Give a Fuck" (featuring Bun B and Twista)	Jones; Bernard Freeman; Carl Mitchell; Lockings; Lovelace	Lovelace	4:22
16.	"Gimme That" (featuring Maino)	Jones; Lockings; Lovelace; Jermaine Coleman	Jeekyman	4:27
17.	"Kitty Box"	Jones; Marcus Vest; C. Maurice; Robbie van Leeuwen	Channel 7	3:49
18.	"Kronik" (featuring Snoop Dogg and Jack Knight)	Jones; Fredwreck Nassar	Fredwreck	4:32
19.	"Winners and Losers Skit"			0:57
20.	"Get Yours" (featuring T.I. and Sha-Dash)	Jones; Clifford Harris; Cates; V. Carraway	Cates	4:09
21.	"Last Day"	Jones; Rotem	J.R. Rotem	4:29
22.	"Last Day Skit"			5:30
Total length:				76:31

Sample credits

- "Spell Check" contains interpolations of "Mo Money Mo Problems" by Notorious B.I.G.
- "All Good" contains samples from "Juicy" by Notorious B.I.G..
- "I Know You See Me" contains samples from "Whatcha See Is Whatcha Get" by The Dramatics.
- "Durty" contains samples from "Wild Bird" by Martha Veléz and elements from "Phunk U Symphony" by Millie Jackson.
- "Kitty Box" contains elements from "Love Buzz" by Shocking Blue.

== Personnel ==
- Kimberly "Lil' Kim" Jones – executive producer
- Christopher "The Notorious B.I.G." Wallace – executive producer
- Craig Kallman – executive producer
- Hillary Weston – co-executive producer, manager
- Jean Nelson – co-executive producer, A&R
- Gee Roberson – co-executive producer, A&R
- Dre Weston – A&R
- Kyambo "HipHop" Joshua – A&R
- Lanre Gaba – A&R administrator
- Jamel Jackson – product manager
- Veronica Alvericci – product manager
- Dan the Man for Dan Man Productions – engineer
- Chris Gehringer – mastering
- Will Quinell – assistant mastering engineer
- L. Londell McMillian – legal affairs
- Berdon LLP – business affairs
- Deborah Mannis-Gardiner – sample clearances
- Robert D'Este – photography (cover and page 12)
- Roger Erickson – photography (outside inlay and pages 2–11)
- Patty Wilson – styling
- Kithe Brewster – styling
- Will Robinson – hair
- JJ – makeup
- Andrew Zach – art producer
- Ellen To – art direction, design
- Alex Kirzhner – design

== Charts ==
=== Weekly charts ===
Weekly chart performance for The Naked Truth
Chart (2005)	Peak position
Japanese Albums (Oricon)	46
US Billboard 200	6
US Top R&B/Hip-Hop Albums (Billboard)	3
US Top Rap Albums (Billboard)	2

=== Year-end charts ===
Year-end chart performance for The Naked Truth
Chart (2005)	Position
US Top R&B/Hip-Hop Albums (Billboard)	66
