= Wake Me Up (Remy Ma song) =

Single by Remy Ma featuring Lil' Kim
- Released: November 8, 2017
- Recorded: September 2017
- Genre: Gangsta rap
- Length: 3:48
- Label: Columbia
- Songwriters: Remynisce Mackie; Kimberly Jones; Marcello Valenzano; Andre Lyon; Rayshon Cobbs; Alexander Smith; Don Taylor; Tierra Douglas; Ted Kay
- Producers: Cool & Dre; Smittybeatz; 808-Ray

Remy Ma singles chronology
"Heartbreak" (2017)	"Wake Me Up" (2017)	"Melanin Magic" (2018)

Lil' Kim singles chronology
"Download" (2009)	"Wake Me Up" (2017)	"Nasty One" (2018)

Music video
- "Wake Me Up" on YouTube

"Wake Me Up" is a song by the American rapper Remy Ma featuring Lil' Kim. It was released on November 8, 2017, through Columbia Records.

== Background ==
The collaboration was first teased in September 2017 after Remy Ma posted a photo of her and Lil' Kim in the studio on her Instagram account. On October 30, 2017, it was announced that Remy Ma had signed a multimillion-dollar record deal with Columbia Records, with "Wake Me Up" being her first single to be released on the label. It was falsely reported by TMZ, and later spread around several blogs and magazines, that the song was supposed to be a "diss track" aimed at rapper Nicki Minaj, since Remy Ma had previously released "Shether", a "diss track" aimed at Minaj, after Nicki allegedly dissed Remy on two different songs in a matter of days. Remy Ma and the radio station Power 105.1 were quick to deny the rumours, although blogs kept labeling the song as a "diss track". Jones disproved that during her interview with Ebro on HOT 97 saying, "The messed up thing is because we are real artists, and me and Remy do what we do, no matter what we say, if I be like, 'Fake-ass such and such.' They'll be like 'Oh! She's talking about such and such.' I feel like people know me and Remy well enough that if we are going to talk about somebody, we are going to say their name. We are going to address them. We gonna make that or whatever. We just making music." Remy Ma also denied the rumours during an interview with the Breakfast Club Power 105.1 FM.

== Composition ==
"Wake Me Up" samples Lil' Kim's song "Queen Bitch" from her 1996 album Hard Core, which in turn samples Roberta Flack's version of Leonard Cohen's "Hey, That's No Way to Say Goodbye".

== Music video ==
Several photos from the set of the music video were leaked by TMZ on October 30, 2017. It was later announced that the music video would be premiered on The Wendy Williams Show. The music video was initially teased on The Wendy Williams Show and TRL during Remy's live appearances, on November 13. It was officially released on November 16, having over 1 million views in under 24 hours.

== Commercial performance ==
"Wake Me Up" was the number 1 most-added song on Urban Radio and third most added song on Rhythmic Radio. The single peaked at number 13 on Spotify's United States' Viral 50 chart and number 14 on Spotify's Global Viral 50 chart. The single was also number 32 on Billboard R&B/Hip-Hop Airplay chart, number 14 on Billboard R&B/Hip-Hop Digital Song Sales chart, number 21 on Billboard Mainstream R&B/Hip-Hop chart, number 21 on Billboard Rap Airplay chart, number 2 on Billboard Bubbling Under R&B/Hip-Hop Songs chart, number 49 on Billboard Digital Songs chart and number 15 on Billboard Bubbling Under Hot 100.

== Charts ==
Chart (2017)	Peak position
US Bubbling Under Hot 100 (Billboard)	15
US Bubbling Under R&B/Hip-Hop Singles (Billboard)	2
US Digital Song Sales (Billboard)	49
US R&B/Hip-Hop Airplay (Billboard)	32
