= Queen Bee Entertainment =

American record label

- Founded: 1999
- Founder: Lil' Kim
- Distributors: Atlantic Records (1999–2010); Republic Records (2010–2012) eOne (2017–Present)
- Genre: Hardcore hip hop
- Country of origin: United States

Queen Bee Entertainment (also known as International Rock Star Records) is a record label founded by American rapper Lil' Kim in 1999. It has signed artists including Lil Cease and Tiffany Foxx. The label's name is a reference to Lil' Kim's alias "Queen Bee."

== History ==
In 1999, Lil' Kim started her own label, after previously being contracted to Big Beat/Undeas. She got help from Sean Combs with starting her own label, and signed Junior MAFIA as the first act. In December 1999, Kim then signed to Atlantic, which agreed to also provide distribution for the artists on her label. In 2006, Kim partnered with Lance Rivera along with Queen Latifah's Flavor Unit, which would be managing her career serve as stake holders for the label. Kim was later granted release from her contract with Atlantic, and in 2017, signed the label to a distribution deal with E1.

== Artists ==
- Lil' Kim (CEO and President)
- Tiffany Foxx
- Junior M.A.F.I.A.
- Lil' Cease
- Mr. Bristal
- Blake C

== Discography ==
=== Albums released on label ===
Albums released on Queen Bee Entertainment label.
Artist	Album details	Peak chart positions								Certifications	Sales
Artist	Album details	US	US R&B	FRA	GER	JPN	NL	SWI	UK	Certifications	Sales
Lil' Cease	Title: The Wonderful World of Cease A Leo; Released: July 13, 1999; Singles: "Play Around"	26	3	—	—	—	—	—	—		
Lil' Kim	Title: The Notorious K.I.M.; Released: June 27, 2000; Singles: "No Matter What They Say", "How Many Licks?"	4	1	70	76	—	85	100	67	US: Platinum; CAN: Gold	US: 1,500,000; WW: 5,100,000 (as of 2007)
Lil' Kim	Title: La Bella Mafia; Released: March 4, 2003; Singles: "The Jump Off", "Magic Stick", "Thug Luv"	5	4	105	82	33	—	81	80	US: Platinum	US: 1,100,000; WW: 1,600,000
Lil' Kim	Title: The Naked Truth; Released: September 27, 2005; Singles: "Lighters Up", "Whoa"	6	3	—	—	46	—	—	—	US:	US: 420,000; WW : 2,700,000 (as of 2010)
Lil' Kim	Title: 9; Released: October 11, 2019; Singles: "Go Awff", "Found You"	—	—	—	—	—	—	—	—		

=== Mixtape releases ===
- 2008: Lil' Kim – Ms. G.O.A.T.
- 2010: Sha Money XL – Sha Money
- 2011: Lil' Kim – Black Friday
- 2012: I.R.S South – Tax Season
- 2012: Tiffany Foxx – Yellow Tape
- 2013: I.R.S – The Compilation
- 2014: Tiffany Foxx – King Foxx
- 2014: Lil' Kim – Hard Core 2K14
- 2016: Lil' Kim – Lil Kim Season
