= Junior M.A.F.I.A. discography =

Since their launch in 1995, Junior M.A.F.I.A., an American hip hop group, have released two studio albums - Conspiracy and Riot Musik - and a number of compilation albums, mixtapes, singles (including Get Money from Conspiracy), and music videos.

== Studio albums ==
List of studio albums, with selected chart positions and certifications
Title	Album details	Peak chart positions				Certifications
Title	Album details	US	US Ind.	US R&B	CAN	Certifications
Conspiracy	Released: August 29, 1995; Label: Big Beat, Atlantic; Formats: CD, LP, cassette	8	—	2	64	RIAA: Gold
Riot Musik	Released: April 19, 2005; Label: Mega Media; Formats: CD, LP, digital download	—	50	61	—	
"—" denotes a recording that did not chart or was not released in that territory.

== Compilation albums ==
List of compilation albums
Title	Album details
The Best of Junior M.A.F.I.A.	Released: June 22, 2004; Label: X-Ray; Formats: CD, LP, digital download
Die Anyway	Released: March 26, 2007; Label: Street Dance; Formats: CD, LP, digital download

== Mixtapes ==
List of Mixtapes
Title	Album details
Junior M.A.F.I.A.: The Lost Files	Released: 2009; Formats: digital download
Lil Cease & the Mafia Dons Riding for the King	Released: 2014; Formats: digital download

== Singles ==
List of singles, with selected chart positions and certifications, showing year released and album name
Title	Year	Peak chart positions					Certifications	Album
Title	Year	US	US R&B	US Rap	NZ	UK	Certifications	Album
"Player's Anthem"	1995	13	7	2	—	—	RIAA: Gold	Conspiracy
"I Need You Tonight" (featuring Aaliyah)	1995	103	43	12	—	66		Conspiracy
"Get Money"	1996	17	4	1	35	63	RIAA: Platinum	Conspiracy
"—" denotes a recording that did not chart or was not released in that territory.

== Guest appearances ==
List of non-single guest appearances, with other performing artists, showing year released and album name
Title	Year	Other artist(s)	Album
"We Don't Need It"	1996	none	Sunset Park soundtrack
"Fuck You"	1996	Lil' Kim	Hard Core
"Young G's Perspective"	1996	Black Jack, The Notorious B.I.G.	Addicted to Drama
"White Chalk, Pt. 2"	1996	none	Original Gangstas soundtrack
"Young Casanovas"	1997	Mase, Cam'ron, LeVert	How to Be a Player soundtrack
"Biggie"	1999	The Notorious B.I.G.	Born Again
"Do What You Like"	2000	Lil' Kim	The Notorious K.I.M.
"Chinatown"	2001	DJ Clue?, Lil' Kim, Lil' Cease	The Professional 2
"Just Us"	2006	The Heatmakerz	Pre Crack
"Guap"	2007	Boss Money	VerseAtility II: In Stereo

== Music videos ==
=== As lead artist ===
List of music videos as lead artist, with directors, showing year released
Title	Year	Director(s)	Albums
"Player's Anthem"	1995	Lance "Un" Rivera	Conspiracy
"I Need You Tonight" (featuring Aaliyah)	1995	Lance "Un" Rivera	Conspiracy
"Get Money"	1996	Lance "Un" Rivera	Conspiracy
"Just Us"	2005	unknown	Riot Musik
"Let's Get It On"	2005	unknown	Riot Musik
"Brooklyn"	2014	Mazi O	Ridin For The King
"Dolo"	2014	Mazi O	Ridin For The King
"Money Good"	2014	Mazi O	Ridin For The King

=== As featured artist ===
List of music videos as featured artist, with directors, showing year released
Title	Year	Director(s)
"Biggie" (The Notorious B.I.G. featuring Junior M.A.F.I.A.)	2000	Marcus Raboy
