= Lance Rivera =

American music executive

- Born: January 1966 (age 60); Brooklyn, New York City, U.S.
- Other name: Un
- Occupations: Film director; film producer; screenwriter; record producer; record executive
- Years active: 1994–2014
- Musical career
- Labels: Untertainment; Undeas

Lance "Un" Rivera is an American film director, film producer, screenwriter, record producer, and music executive.

== Career ==
Lance Rivera began his musical career when he met neighborhood rapper Christopher Wallace, who performed under the name Biggie Smalls. After hearing him perform, Rivera offered to finance his musical career.

=== Undeas Recordings and Untertainment ===
In 1994, Rivera and his business partner, The Notorious B.I.G. founded Undeas Entertainment. Rivera received a cash advance of US$200,000 from Atlantic Records to launch the label. An eighth of the budget was allocated towards the debut studio album of Junior M.A.F.I.A., which was formed the year prior. Junior M.A.F.I.A. released their only album under Undeas/Atlantic, Conspiracy in 1995. The album received gold certification by the Recording Industry Association of America in less than a month and spawned two singles: "Player's Anthem" and "Get Money"; both of which gained way for the breakout solo career of its core member, Lil' Kim. The following year, on November 12, 1996, Undeas released Kim's debut solo album Hard Core, which included the singles, "No Time", "Crush on You" and "Not Tonight". Both became Billboard Hot 100 top ten hits and helped the album peak at number 11 on the Billboard 200.

In 1997, Rivera launched his successor label, Untertainment Records. The label's roster included Harlem rapper Cam'ron, Philadelphia rappers Dutch and Spade of Major Figgas, and Charli Baltimore; Cam'ron and Charli Baltimore were signed through Epic Records while Dutch and Spade were signed to Interscope Records. The label's first release was the soundtrack to the 1998 comedy film, Woo. Only Cam'ron released two albums under the label: 1998's Confessions of Fire and 2000's S.D.E.. In July 1999, Junior M.A.F.I.A. member Lil' Cease released a solo album under Undeas, The Wonderful World of Cease A Leo. Fellow Junior M.A.F.I.A. affiliate Lil' Kim released her second album, The Notorious K.I.M. (2000) the following year in June—also under Undeas. Despite the album being her final album released under Undeas and receiving platinum certification in less than two months, Rivera was in no way involved in the project. After losing Untertainment artist Charli Baltimore to Irv Gotti's Murder Inc. Records, Rivera attempted a comeback in the music business with the release of Major Figgas' Dutch and Spade's collaborative single, "If You Want It". However, after the single failed to chart, the duo's For My Family album, originally planned for a November 2001 release, was shelved.

=== Movie career ===
Rivera transitioned from music to working in film. He teamed up with Queen Latifah and her Flavor Unit partner, Shakim Compere, to establish Crossover Media, a marketing advertising company. He went on to make his feature film directorial debut with The Cookout (2004), starring Queen Latifah, as well as Tim Meadows, Ja Rule, Eve, Jenifer Lewis, Danny Glover and Storm P in an all-star cast. The film opened on 1,303 screens, and opened at number eight in the box office with a gross of $5,000,900. After seven weeks, it ended with a domestic gross of $11,814,019 and made $195,051 from foreign countries, for a total of $12,009,070 worldwide.

His second film, The Perfect Holiday, released in November 2007 and also starring Queen Latifah (alongside Morris Chestnut, Charlie Murphy, and Gabrielle Union) opened at number six with $2.2 million; The film grossed $5.8 million domestically.

In early 2014, Rivera reunited with Cam'ron (who co-wrote the screenplay) for the production of the direct-to-media film, Percentage, which also co-starred Omar Gooding.

== Personal life ==
=== 1999 stabbing incident ===
On December 2, 1999, Rivera was stabbed by hip-hop entrepreneur Jay-Z at the release party for Q-Tip's album Amplified at the now-closed Kit Kat Club in Times Square. The incident arose over the alleged bootlegging of Jay-Z's album Vol. 3... Life and Times of S. Carter before its release on December 28. In October 2001, Jay-Z pleaded guilty to a third-degree assault charge and was sentenced to three years probation.

In an early 2023 interview with DJ Vlad, Rivera claimed that Jay-Z falsely took responsibility for the stabbing, clarifying that the rapper did not commit the crime towards him.

== Filmography ==
Year	Title	Director	Writer	Producer	Notes
2004	The Cookout	Yes	No	No	Directorial debut
2007	Life Support	No	No	Yes	
2007	The Perfect Holiday	Yes	Yes	No	
2008	The Angie Martinez Show	No	No	Yes	
2009	Broke & Famous	No	No	Yes	
2010	Charlie Murphy: I Will Not Apologize	Yes	No	No	
2011	The Cookout 2	Yes	No	No	
2012	Katt Williams: Kattpacalypse	No	No	Yes	
2014	Percentage	No	No	Yes	
