= 1996 Soul Train Music Awards =

Music awards ceremony in Los Angeles, US

Soul Train Music Awards
- Date: March 29, 1996
- Location: Shrine Auditorium, Los Angeles, California
- Country: United States
- Hosted by: Anita Baker, Brandy and LL Cool J
- First award: 1987

Highlights
- Most awards: D'Angelo and TLC (3)
- Website: soultrain.com

Television/radio coverage
- Network: WGN America

The 1996 Soul Train Music Awards was held on March 29, 1996, at the Shrine Auditorium in Los Angeles, California. The show honored the best in R&B, soul, rap, jazz, and gospel music from the previous year. The show was hosted by Brandy, LL Cool J and Anita Baker.

== Special awards ==
=== Heritage Award for Career Achievement ===
- Patti LaBelle

=== Sammy Davis Jr. Award for Entertainer of the Year ===
- Boyz II Men

== Winners and nominees ==
Winners are in bold text.

=== R&B/Soul Album of the Year – Male ===
- **D'Angelo – Brown Sugar**
  - 'Michael Jackson' – HIStory: Past, Present and Future, Book I
  - Jon B. – Bonafide
  - Brian McKnight – I Remember You

=== R&B/Soul Album of the Year – Female ===
- **Mary J. Blige – My Life**
  - Mariah Carey – Daydream
  - Faith Evans – Faith
  - Monica – Miss Thang

=== R&B/Soul Album of the Year – Group, Band or Duo ===
- **TLC – CrazySexyCool**
  - Jodeci – The Show, the After Party, the Hotel
  - Solo – Solo
  - Xscape – Off the Hook

=== Best R&B/Soul Single – Male ===
- **D'Angelo – "Brown Sugar"**
  - Michael Jackson – "You Are Not Alone"
  - Montell Jordan – "This Is How We Do It"
  - Seal – "Kiss from a Rose"

=== Best R&B/Soul Single – Female ===
- **Whitney Houston – "Exhale (Shoop Shoop)"**
  - Mary J. Blige – "I'm Going Down"
  - Brandy – "Brokenhearted"
  - Monica – "Like This Like That/"Before You Walk Out Of My Life"

=== Best R&B/Soul Single – Group, Band, or Duo ===
- **TLC – "Waterfalls"**
  - Boyz II Men – "Water Runs Dry"
  - Groove Theory – "Tell Me"
  - Jodeci – "Love U 4 Life"

=== R&B/Soul or Rap Song of the Year ===
- **The Notorious B.I.G. – "One More Chance"**
  - Whitney Houston – "Exhale (Shoop Shoop)"
  - Method Man (featuring Mary J. Blige) – "I'll Be There for You/You're All I Need to Get By"
  - TLC – "Waterfalls"

=== Best R&B/Soul or Rap Music Video ===
- **TLC – "Waterfalls"**
  - Coolio (featuring L.V.) – "Gangsta's Paradise"
  - Dr. Dre – "Keep Their Heads Ringin'"
  - Michael Jackson and Janet Jackson – "Scream"

=== Best R&B/Soul or Rap New Artist ===
- **D'Angelo**
  - Faith Evans
  - Junior M.A.F.I.A.
  - Monica

=== Best Rap Album ===
- **2Pac – Me Against The World**
  - Bone Thugs-N-Harmony – E. 1999 Eternal
  - Coolio – Gangsta's Paradise
  - Method Man – Tical

=== Best Jazz Album ===
- **Fourplay – Elixir**
  - Boney James – Seduction
  - Keiko Matsui – Sapphire
  - Pat Metheny Group – We Live Here

=== Best Gospel Album ===
- **The New Life Community Choir Featuring John P. Kee – Show Up**
  - Yolanda Adams – More Than a Melody
  - Shirley Caesar – He Will Come
  - Kirk Franklin and the Family – Kirk Franklin & the Family Christmas

== Performances ==
- LL Cool J – "Doin' It"
- TLC
- Anita Baker
- Mary J. Blige – "Not Gon' Cry"
- The Notorious B.I.G. – "One More Chance" / "Get Money"
- Faith Evans
- Yolanda Adams – "The Battle Is the Lord's"
- Brandy – "Sittin' Up in My Room"
- Patti LaBelle Tribute:
  - Ronald Isley, Rachelle Ferrell, Peabo Bryson, Tamia – "If Only You Knew"
- Patti LaBelle – "Over the Rainbow"

== Presenters ==
- Shemar Moore, Salt-N-Pepa and Veronica Webb - Presented Best R&B/Soul Single - Group, Band or Duo
- Sinbad and Da Brat - Presented Best R&B/Soul or Rap Music Video
- Bill Cosby - Presented Sammy Davis Jr. Award for Entertainer of the Year
- Salli Richardson, Blackstreet and Method Man - Presented Best Jazz Album
- Tichina Arnold, Jon B. and Goodie Mob - Presented Best R&B/Soul or Rap New Artist
- D'Angelo, Chantay Savage and Immature - Presented Best R&B/Soul Single - Female
- Tamara Taylor, Chris Kelly and Montell Jordan - Presented R&B/Soul or Rap Song of the Year
- Monica, Dalvin DeGrate and Groove Theory - Presented Best Gospel Album
- Seal - Presented Quincy Jones Award Outstanding For Career Achievements
- Dorien Wilson, CeCe Peniston and Solo - Presented Best Rap Album
- Tevin Campbell, John Henton and Faith Evans - Presented Best R&B/Soul Album - Group, Band or Duo
- Brian McKnight, Xscape and Monifah - Presented Best R&B/Soul Single - Male
- Robert Townsend, Jermaine Dupri and Brownstone - Presented Best R&B/Soul Album - Male
- Heavy D, Terry Ellis and Total - Presented Best R&B/Soul Album - Female
