= One More Chance (The Notorious B.I.G. song) =

Single by The Notorious B.I.G.

from the album Ready to Die
- B-side: "The What"
- Released: June 6, 1995
- Recorded: 1993 (Remix: 1994)
- Studio: The Hit Factory (New York City)
- Genre: Hip hop
- Length: 4:29
- Label: Bad Boy; Arista
- Songwriters: Christopher Wallace; Sean Combs; Reginald D. Ellis; Norman A. Glover; Carl Thompson
- Producers: Sean "Puffy" Combs; Rashad Smith

The Notorious B.I.G. singles chronology
"Player's Anthem" (1995)	"One More Chance" (1995)	"Get Money" (1996)

Music video
- "One More Chance" on YouTube

"One More Chance" is a song written and recorded by American rapper The Notorious B.I.G. Three versions of the song exist: An original, lyrically explicit version prefaced by an answering machine performance featured on the album, and two versions released as singles, both of which contain identical lyrics by B.I.G. despite differing instrumentals and choruses. The first is an upbeat "Hip Hop Mix" that samples Marley Marl's "Droppin Science", and the second is a sultrier R&B remix parenthetically labeled the "Stay with Me Remix", which samples the namesake 1983 song by the band DeBarge. The lattermost remains the most popular, and features backing vocals and harmonies performed by his wife Faith Evans, as well as uncredited appearances by Mary J. Blige and Bad Boy Records label boss Puff Daddy—who also produced the version with Rashad Smith. (Note: Evans's appearance is only credited as "additional vocals"; she is not officially given a "featuring" credit. Blige's name does not appear on the CD single release.) It received platinum certification by the RIAA by July 31, 1995, and has sold 1.1 million copies.

The song topped the Hot R&B/Hip-Hop Songs chart and debuted at number five on the Billboard Hot 100, where it then peaked at number two (kept off the top by TLC's "Waterfalls"). At the time, it was tied as the highest-debuting single in the chart's history and matched Michael Jackson and Janet Jackson's 1995 single "Scream"; Jackson broke the record once more with his single released the following August, "You Are Not Alone", which debuted atop the chart. Notwithstanding, Puff Daddy's "I'll Be Missing You", a tribute to the then-recently deceased B.I.G., became the first hip hop song to debut in the top spot.

== Synopsis ==
The song begins as a recording of an answering machine message in which one of B.I.G's daughters, having apparently been prompted by her mother, requests that women stop calling the household. This is followed by a number of messages left by jilted former lovers expressing a mixture of fondness, yearning, contempt and confusion towards Biggie.

Following the introduction, the song largely centers on the rapper's sexual prowess. B.I.G makes a number of claims, such as comparing his sexual performance to the famous boxing match the Thrilla in Manila, and asserting that he has a very large and desirable penis.

Aside from the above claims, B.I.G also expresses, towards the end of the song, that he prefers relationships based around sex, and prefers the women leave him alone afterwards. This is implicitly suggested to be the result of women having become too attached to him in the past, and it is alleged that some have stalked him. The song closes with the titular chorus, which is a refrain of a female voice asking, 'Oh, Biggie, give me one more chance'.

"A hot record," remarked Jay-Z. "Sonically, it was amazing."

== Ready to Die version ==
The version that is on Ready to Die was produced by Sean Combs and features R&B trio Total and not Faith Evans. It samples "Hydra" by Grover Washington, Jr. and features an interpolation of "I Want You Back" by the Jackson 5 on the chorus. The lyrics on the album version are different and more profane from both remixes.

Lil' Cease's niece provides the voice of the child on Biggie's answering machine. His sister and her friends played the various women who leave messages.

The original beat of the original version has a sample of DeBarge's "All This Love" and it can be found on D.J. Semi's Ready to Die: The O.G. Version.

== Other versions ==
"One More Chance / Stay with Me (Remix)" (additional vocals by Faith Evans) is the official remix to the original version. The remix has a completely different sound than the original. It was produced by Rashad Smith and samples "Stay with Me" by DeBarge. Appears on the single and the popular version. A music video was made for this song. The video was directed by Hype Williams and features appearances by Faith Evans, Total, Luther Campbell, Heavy D, Mary J. Blige, Da Brat, Jermaine Dupri, D-Nice, Patra, Miss Jones, Queen Latifah, Craig Mack, Cypress Hill, Tyson Beckford, Aaliyah, Changing Faces, Kid Capri, Junior M.A.F.I.A., Zhane, and P. Diddy.

"One More Chance (Hip Hop Remix)" (featuring Total) - Also appears on the single and uses the verses from the "Stay with Me" remix except the beat and chorus is different. Also appears on the clean version of Ready to Die (instead of the original). Samples Lou Donaldson's "Who's Making Love?".

"Want That Old Thing Back" (featuring Ja Rule & Ralph Tresvant) - Appears on Greatest Hits and the bonus disc of Duets: The Final Chapter and features a different beat as well as a chorus by Tresvant and a verse by Ja Rule. Uses Biggie's verses from the original "One More Chance".

"Only One Thing" (featuring Lil' Kim) - Appears on Mick Boogie's Unbelievable mixtape and has a chorus and verse by Kim and uses Biggie's first verse from the original "One More Chance".

"Foolish"/"Unfoolish" - A single by Ashanti. The song samples "Stay with Me" by DeBarge, the same sample used on the "One More Chance" / "Stay with Me" remix. A remix, "Unfoolish", was made which features Biggie's first verse from "Fucking You Tonight" as the third verse. "Fucking You Tonight" was Biggie's 1997 song with R. Kelly, from Life After Death, which was released after his shooting that year. "Unfoolish" appears on Ashanti's debut album and on We Invented the Remix Vol. 1.

"One More Chance / The Legacy (Remix)" (featuring Faith Evans & CJ Wallace (their son)) - The official remix to the "Stay with Me" remix. Appears on the soundtrack of Notorious B.I.G.'s biopic Notorious.

This song played as tribute to Biggie in the Up in Smoke Tour, which was in 2000. Snoop Dogg announced that Biggie was his friend and wished the two had a better relationship before he passed. Snoop Dogg and Dr. Dre played this song as homage to Biggie.

"M.V.P" - A single by Big L. This song samples "Stay with Me" by DeBarge and has the same meter and cadence as "One More Chance". It was released a few months earlier and was produced by Lord Finesse.

== Music video ==
The music video features cameos by Faith Evans, Heavy D, Total, Luke, D-Nice, Kid Capri, Craig Mack, Aaliyah, Patra, Tyson Beckford, Da Brat, Jermaine Dupri, Changing Faces, Miss Jones, Zhané, Mary J. Blige and Queen Latifah.

== Live performances ==
Biggie performed the song live at the 1995 Source Awards on August 3, 1995. He performed the song live on Showtime at the Apollo on November 18, 1995. He also performed the song live at the 1996 Soul Train Music Awards on March 29, 1996.

== Track listings ==
=== 12" vinyl single ===
==== A-side ====
1. "One More Chance / Stay with Me" (radio edit 1) – 4:15
2. "One More Chance" (hip hop mix) – 5:05
3. "One More Chance / Stay with Me" (radio edit 2) – 4:35
4. "One More Chance" (hip hop instrumental) – 5:08

==== B-side ====
1. "One More Chance" (hip hop radio edit) – 4:24
2. "The What" (radio edit) – 4:08
3. "One More Chance / Stay with Me" (instrumental) – 4:35

=== CD single ===
1. "One More Chance / Stay with Me" (radio edit 1) – 4:17
2. "One More Chance" (hip hop mix) – 5:07
3. "One More Chance / Stay with Me" (radio edit 2) – 4:37
4. "The What" (radio edit) – 4:00

=== Cassette single ===
==== Side one ====
1. "One More Chance" (radio edit 1)
2. "One More Chance" (hip hop radio edit)
3. "The What" (radio edit)

==== Side two ====
1. "One More Chance" (hip hop mix)
2. "One More Chance" (radio edit 2)

== Charts ==
=== Weekly charts ===
Chart (1995)	Peak position
Canada (The Record)	7
New Zealand (Recorded Music NZ)	48
Scottish Singles Sales (Official Charts)	92
UK Singles (Official Charts)	34
UK Dance (Official Charts)	8
UK Hip Hop/R&B (Official Charts)	4
US Billboard Hot 100	2
US Dance Singles Sales (Billboard)	18
US Hot R&B/Hip-Hop Songs (Billboard)	1
US Hot Rap Songs (Billboard)	1
US Cash Box Top 100	2

=== Year-end charts ===
Chart (1995)	Position
US Billboard Hot 100	23
US Cash Box Top 100	34

== Certifications ==
Region	Certification	Certified units/sales
New Zealand (RMNZ)	Platinum	30,000^{‡}
United Kingdom (BPI) Stay With Me Remix	Silver	200,000^{‡}
United States (RIAA)	Platinum	1,100,000
^{‡} Sales+streaming figures based on certification alone.

== See also ==
- List of number-one R&B singles of 1995 (U.S.)
