= Crush on You (Lil' Kim song) =

1997 single by Lil' Kim featuring Lil' Cease

Single by Lil' Kim featuring Lil' Cease

from the album Hard Core
- Released: June 10, 1997
- Recorded: 1996
- Genre: Hip hop
- Length: 4:32
- Label: Undeas; Big Beat; Atlantic
- Songwriters: Mason Betha; Andreao Heard; Christopher Wallace; Kimberly Jones; Jeff Lorber
- Producer: Andraeo "Fanatic" Heard

Lil' Kim singles chronology
"No Time" (1996)	"Crush on You" (1997)	"I Can Love You" (1997)

Music video
- "Crush on You" on YouTube

"Crush on You" is a song by American rapper Lil' Kim. The original version, a solo performance by fellow Junior M.A.F.I.A. member Lil' Cease, was released in 1996 on Lil' Kim's debut album Hard Core. In 1997, a remix of the song with Lil' Kim performing alongside Lil' Cease was released as a non-album single. The Notorious B.I.G. makes an uncredited appearance, performing the chorus, on both versions. The remix peaked at number 23 on the UK Singles Chart. The song samples "Rain Dance" by the Jeff Lorber Fusion.

== Background ==
According to music executive Lance Rivera's first hand account in a May 2023 VladTV interview, Biggie instructed "Un" to cut rapper Mase (Mason Betha) a check for $45,000 to write six songs for Lil' Cease's debut album. According to rapper Cam'ron in an April 2021 interview on Drink Champs, however, Mase, in turn, paid him $5,000 to write a song on his behalf which later turned out to be "Crush on You." The original song included three verses for Lil' Cease with vocals from Biggie. According to a January 2022 VladTV interview, Lil' Cease, apparently hated the song, and Notorious B.I.G. made the decision to put the song on Lil' Kim's debut album in its original form without any verses or vocals from Lil' Kim to help break Lil' Cease's career. After the commercial success of Lil' Kim's first single "No Time featuring Sean Combs," radio stations began to play the original version of "Crush on You" on Lil' Kim's Album. Given the explosion in radio airplay, a remixed single of "Crush on You" was released featuring two verses and additional ad-libs written by Lil' Kim. In a Fall 2016 issue of XXL magazine, Lil' Kim told a slightly different version of the story from her point of view stating: "I do remember being pregnant at the end of that album, where I couldn't really finish some of the songs and that's how Lil' Cease ended up on "Crush on You." He wasn't supposed to be on that record, but I was sick and I had to go away and clear my head because I was pregnant. I wanted to finish the album because that's what I wanted. I really wanted to display my talent to the world." But as Cam'ron confirmed in XXL: "I wrote the 'Crush on You' song and they ended up keeping it for Lil' Kim album but it was really for Lil' Cease. The original 'Crush on You' is all Lil' Cease, Lil' Kim isn't even on the record." Although Lil' Kim's unexpected pregnancy made it difficult for her to complete her album, "Crush on You" was written for Lil' Cease. Lil' Cease wasn't on the song by accident, it was intended (along with a number of other songs written by Mase and Cam'ron) to be used on a future Lil' Cease solo album. Finally, it was Biggie who made the decision to include "Crush on You" on Lil' Kim's debut album to help promote Lil' Cease's career.

== Samples ==
The song has been sampled many times since its release, including:

- Mariah Carey sampled the beat on her song "A No No" from her album Caution in 2018, as well as various remixes of her song.

== Music video ==
The music video was directed by Lance "Un" Rivera and it was filmed on January 29, 1997. The music video was released for the week ending on February 23, 1997. The music video for "Crush on You" is noted as being the first video to feature the different colored wigs that Kim became known for. The theme for the video, the changing floor colors, was based on the film The Wiz. After deciding on the theme, Kim and her stylist thought that her outfits should change to match the floor color, with Kim adding that she should wear wigs to match as well. The video consists of four colored setups, blue, yellow, green and red with Kim's outfits and wigs changing throughout to match.

Additionally, Luke, Aaliyah, Leslie Segar, Ed Lover and Sheek Louch make cameos in the music video.

== Track listing ==
UK CD single

1. "Crush on You" (squeaky clean radio edit) - 4:00
2. "Crush on You" (Desert Eagle Discs remix - short / clean) - 5:39
3. "Crush on You" (Desert Eagle Discs remix - instrumental) - 7:03
4. "Crush on You" (Aim remix) - 4:33
5. "Crush on You" (Aim instrumental) 4:33
6. "Crush on You" (acapella) 4:32

== Credits ==
- Vocals - Lil' Cease
- Additional vocals - Notorious B.I.G.
- Producer - Andreao "Fanatic" Heard"
- Recorded at The Hit Factory
- Engineer – Tony Black

=== Remix version ===
- Engineer – Axel Niehaus
- Producer - Andreao "Fanatic" Heard"

== Charts ==
=== Weekly charts ===
Chart (1997)	Peak position
Scottish Singles Sales (Official Charts)	56
UK Singles (Official Charts)	23
UK Dance (Official Charts)	7
UK Hip Hop/R&B (Official Charts)	5
US Dance Singles Sales (Billboard); With "Not Tonight"	2
US Radio Songs (Billboard)	52
US R&B/Hip-Hop Airplay (Billboard)	4
US Rhythmic Airplay (Billboard)	34

=== Year-end charts ===
Chart (1997)	Position
US Hot Dance Maxi-Singles Sales (Billboard)	11

== Certifications ==
Region	Certification	Certified units/sales
United States (RIAA)	Platinum	1,000,000^{‡}
^{‡} Sales+streaming figures based on certification alone.
