= April Maiya =

American film director

April Maiya is an American film producer, director and fashion designer.

== Background ==
April Maiya was born of Vietnamese and Pacific Island descent. Maiya grew up in the suburbs of Los Angeles to conservative Buddhist parents. She attended the University of California as a political science pre-law major and subsequently made her home in New York City to pursue film, music and fashion. She became a professional documentary filmmaker. Maiya dated film director John Singleton and is currently married to a music industry personality.

== Career ==
From her hobby started in high school, Maiya founded Bella Honey, a lingerie swimwear line which debuted in Chris Brown "Yo" video. The brand was featured in Maxim, Stuff, FHM publications in the U.S. and Patricia Field boutique which subsequently landed the bikinis on HBO's Sex and the City series.

She started her career in music as a Music Supervisor for DreamWorks and Paramount Pictures under film and TV Producer and Director Reginald Hudlin at Black Entertainment Television (BET) as a producer for the hip hop show, "Rap City", and made her directorial debut while in film school in the music documentary Chronicles of Junior M.A.F.I.A. featuring rappers: The Notorious B.I.G., Junior M.A.F.I.A. and Lil' Kim. She went on to produce and direct Life After Death: The Movie (2007) detailing the story behind the shooting in front of New York's Hot 97 which landed rapper Lil' Kim in prison. The film featured actor Jamie Hector, a/k/a "Marlo Stansfield" of the HBO's television series The Wire, as the narrator.
