= The King & I (Faith Evans and The Notorious B.I.G. album) =

Studio album by Faith Evans and The Notorious B.I.G.
- Released: May 19, 2017
- Genre: Hip hop; R&B
- Length: 72:13
- Label: Rhino Entertainment
- Producer: Battlecat; Beatnick Dee; Chucky Thompson; DJ Premier; Faith Hill; Fredwreck; J. Drew Sheard II; J. Dub; James Poyser; Just Blaze; Kevin McCall; Lamar "MyGuyMars" Edwards; Preach Bal4; Salaam Remi; Sean "Puff Daddy" Combs; Stevie J

Faith Evans album chronology
Incomparable (2014)	The King & I (2017)

The Notorious B.I.G. album chronology
Notorious (2009)	The King & I (2017)

The King & I is a collaborative album by American singer Faith Evans and late rapper The Notorious B.I.G., released by Rhino Entertainment on May 19, 2017.

== Critical reception ==
Professional ratings
Aggregate scores
Source	Rating
Metacritic	48/100
Review scores
Source	Rating
AllMusic	2.5/5 stars
Evening Standard	2/5 stars
Exclaim!	5/10
The Guardian	3/5 stars
HipHopDX	3.1/5
Mojo	2/5 stars
The Observer	3/5 stars
Pitchfork	4.5/10
Q	2/5 stars
RapReviews	6/10

The King & I received generally mixed reviews from critics. At Metacritic, which assigns a normalized rating out of 100 to reviews from mainstream critics, the album has an average score of 48 based on 10 reviews. HipHopDX critic Jesse Fairfax called the album a "worthwhile concept that once deserved to see the light of day," but noted that "excessive filler and intermissions dull the shine of" the release. Hannah J. Davis, writing for The Guardian, noted: "With vocals smoother than a vat of cocoa butter, Evans moves from poignant duet to "Juicy"-style sexathon alongside [The Notorious B.I.G. ], although – naturally – it lacks a certain improvisation and cohesion." AllMusic editor Andy Kellman felt that "the constant recycling, along with the quantity and variety of other voices, detract from some of Evans' best, most impassioned performances, which are matched with some solid work from a roster of co-producers."

Pitchfork editor Evan Rytlewski found that while "the project oozes affection for Biggie, it's yet another gangly, recycled posthumous album of verses we've all heard before [...] The muse is solid, and there's something sweet about the idea that after all these years, Biggie still brings out the best in Evans. Now if only his reconstituted raps weren't plastered over every inch of the record." Spin critic Brian Josephs called the album "an unconvincing Biggie tribute" and added: "It's a sweet sentiment, but The King & I wastes too much energy centering a known relationship on these formless descriptions, a flaw that turns a 72-minute project into a poshly produced endurance contest. The classicist early-aughts R&B is informed by Evans' nostalgic impulse, but the effect is often touristic rather than resonant." Damien Morris from The Observer noted that The Notorious B.I.G. "was never boring, unlike this compilation of tired productions and mawkish interludes. Duets should be meetings of equals. Instead, the greatest rapper of all time is propped up slack-jawed and open-eyed in the corner of each track,"

== Commercial performance ==
In the United States of America The King & I debuted at number 65 on the Billboard 200, with 9,000 album-equivalent units. By February 2018, it sold 24,000 copies in the United States.

== Track listing ==
No.	Title	Writer(s)	Producer(s)	Length
1.	"A Billion"	Faith Evans; Steven Jordan; Ben Briggs	Evans; Stevie J	0:59
2.	"Legacy"	Evans; Jordan; Achaia Dixon; Camlle Hooper; Christopher Wallace; Daven Vanderpool; Kimberly Jones; Sean Combs	Evans; Stevie J; Zach Brunson^{[A]}	4:11
3.	"Beautiful (Interlude)"	Evans; Chucky Thompson	Thompson	0:30
4.	"Can't Get Enough"	Evans; Salaam Remi; Toni Coleman; Dixon; Hooper; Wallace; Allen Toussaint; David Matthews; Kutger Campbell	Evans; Remi; James Poyser	3:53
5.	"Don't Test Me"	Evans; Remi; Dixon; Hooper; Wallace; Dennis Lambert; Duane Hitchings; Francine Golde; James Lloyd; Jones	Evans; Remi	3:48
6.	"Big/Faye (Interlude)" (featuring Jamal Woolard)	Evans; Jeffrey "J. Dub" Walker	J. Dub	1:28
7.	"Tryna Get By"	Evans; Dixon; Hooper; Coleman; J. Drew Sheard II; Candace Wakefield; Curtis Rodgers II; Wallace; Robert Caldwell; Hubert Eaves; James Williams; Rodolfo Franklin; Combs	Evans; Sheard	3:46
8.	"The Reason"	Evans; Dixon; Hooper; Coleman; Briggs; Justin Smith; Wallace; Harold Lilly; Isaac Hayes; Jones; Melissa Elliott	Just Blaze	3:38
9.	"I Don't Want It" (featuring Lil' Cease)	Evans; Briggs; Farid Nassar; Jaila Simms-Garbutt; Lloyd; Nick Doherty; Wallace; Jones; Larry Troutman; Mark Richardson; Rayshaun Spain; Roger Troutman	Beatnick Dee; Evans; Fredwreck	3:29
10.	"I Got Married (Interlude)" (featuring Mama Wallace)	Evans; Jordan; Wallace	Evans; Stevie J	2:26
11.	"Ten Wife Commandments"	Evans; Briggs; Sheard; Rebekah Muhammad; Rufus Moore; Coleman; Wallace; Khary Kimani Turner	Evans; Sheard	3:47
12.	"We Just Clicked (Interlude)" (featuring Mama Wallace)	Evans; Jordan; Wallace	Evans; Stevie J	1:05
13.	"A Little Romance"	Evans; Chyna Griffin; Rodgers; David Balfour; Kevin Gilliam; Coleman; Wallace; Daron Jones; Robert Kelly; Combs	Battlecat; Preach Bal4; Evans	3:04
14.	"The Baddest (Interlude)"	Evans; Jordan	Evans; Stevie J	0:43
15.	"Fool for You"	Evans; Dixon; Hooper; Thompson; Stokley Williams	Evans; Thompson	4:22
16.	"Crazy (Interlude)" (featuring 112 and Mama Wallace)	Evans; Thompson; Jones; Marvin Scandrick; Michael Keith; Quinnes Parker; Voletta Wallace	Evans; Thompson	1:13
17.	"Got Me Twisted"	Evans; Thompson; Dixon; Hooper; Walker; Combs	Evans; J. Dub; Combs	2:54
18.	"When We Party" (featuring Snoop Dogg)	Evans; Dixon; Calvin Broadus; Hooper; Sheard; Wallace; Osten Harvey; R. Troutman	Evans; Sheard; Combs	3:27
19.	"Somebody Knows" (featuring Busta Rhymes)	Evans; Dixon; Hooper; Remi; Coleman; Trevor Smith; Allie Wrubel; Wallace; Herbert Magidson; Neshiem Myrick; Combs	Evans; Poyser; Remi	5:15
20.	"Take Me There" (featuring Sheek Louch and Styles P)	Evans; Dixon; Hooper; David Styles; J. Smith; Sean Jacobs; Wallace; Hayes; Jones	Just Blaze	4:01
21.	"One in the Same"	Evans; Dixon; Hooper; Remi; Poyser; Wallace; Harry Casey; Jean-Claude Olivier; Combs	Evans; Poyser; Remi	3:25
22.	"I Wish (Interlude)" (featuring Kevin McCall and Chyna Tahjere)	Evans; Griffin; McCall	Evans; McCall	1:27
23.	"Lovin' You for Life" (featuring Lil' Kim)	Evans; Khirye Tyler; Jones; Lamar Edwards; Wallace; Kier Gist; Lionel Richie	Evans; Edwards	3:49
24.	"NYC" (featuring Jadakiss)	Evans; Griffin; Chris Martin; Wallace; Jason Phillips	DJ Premier; Evans	3:29
25.	"It Was Worth It"	Evans; Dixon; Hooper; Jordan; Brunson	Evans; Stevie J; Brunson^{[A]}	1:58
Total length:				72:13

Bonus tracks
No.	Title	Producer(s)	Length
26.	"Body Language"	Evans; Sheard II	3:20
27.	"My B"	Evans; Sheard II	3:15

Notes

- ^{^[A]} denotes co-producer

Sample credits

- "Legacy" – "Would You Die For Me?"
- "Can't Get Enough" – "Bust A Nut".
- "Don't Test Me" – "Gettin' Money (The Get Money Remix)".
- "Tryna Get By" – "Sky's The Limit".
- "The Reason" – "Why You Tryin' To Play Me". Licensed by Xtra Large Entertainment on behalf of Derrick Hodge and LeTroy Davis.
- "I Don't Want It" – Reference track for "We Don't Need It" by Lil' Kim, previously unreleased.
- "Ten Wife Commandments" – "Ten Crack Commandments".
- "A Little Romance" – "Fuck You Tonight".
- "Got Me Twisted" – "Things Done Changed".
- "When We Party" – "Going Back To Cali".
- "Somebody Knows" – "Who Shot Ya?".
- "Take Me There" – Reference track for "Drugs" by Lil' Kim, previously unreleased.
- "One In The Same" – "Respect".
- "Lovin' You for Life" – "Miss U".
- "NYC" – "Mumblin' and Whisperin'".

== Charts ==
Chart performance for The King & I
Chart (2017)	Peak position
Australian Albums (ARIA)	85
Belgian Albums (Ultratop Flanders)	132
Belgian Albums (Ultratop Wallonia)	174
US Billboard 200	65
US Top R&B/Hip-Hop Albums (Billboard)	31
