= Get Money =

- Cover artwork for the official remix

Single by Junior M.A.F.I.A. featuring the Notorious B.I.G.

from the album Conspiracy
- B-side: "White Chalk"
- Released: February 3, 1996
- Genre: Gangsta rap
- Length: 4:34
- Label: Undeas; Big Beat; Atlantic
- Songwriters: Christopher Wallace; Kimberly Jones; Lamont Porter; James Bedford; Roy Ayers; Sylvia Striplin
- Producer: EZ Elpee

Junior M.A.F.I.A. singles chronology
"I Need You Tonight" (1995)	"Get Money" (1996)

The Notorious B.I.G. singles chronology
"One More Chance" (1995)	"Get Money" (1996)	"Only You" (1996)

Music video
- "Get Money" on YouTube

"Get Money" is a song by the American rap group Junior M.A.F.I.A., released as the third and final single from their debut album, Conspiracy (1995). "Get Money," whose instrumental is fundamentally a sample of R&B singer Sylvia Striplin's 1981 song "You Can't Turn Me Away," was produced by EZ Elpee, rapped by the Notorious B.I.G. and Lil' Kim, and received a music video. B.I.G., formally, was featured, but at times was deemed, like Lil' Kim and Lil' Cease, a Junior M.A.F.I.A. member.

The single included also "Gettin' Money (The Get Money Remix)." Using a different instrumental, a sample of R&B singer Dennis Edwards's 1984 single "Don't Look Any Further," this was produced by DJ Enuff, Lance 'Un' Rivera, and the Notorious B.I.G., and includes new verses by B.I.G, Lil' Kim, and Lil' Cease. The single spent 20 weeks on the main popular songs chart, the US Billboard Hot 100, where it entered on February 10 and peaked at number 17 on May 25. Certified platinum, one million copies sold, "Get Money" ranked #89 in Billboard magazine's Top Hot 100 Hits of 1996. It also reached number 15 on the US Cash Box Top 100 in the same period.

As the "platinum smash" that reinforced Lil' Kim's performance on the gold hit "Player's Anthem," the single critically motivated her debut solo album, a November 1996 release. Meanwhile, spinning the original's Get money hook is the Take money refrain of rapper 2Pac's June 1996 single "Hit 'Em Up," the legendary diss track—answering B.I.G's renowned single "Who Shot Ya," a February 1995 release by Sean "Puffy" Combs's Bad Boy label—that maligns and menaces B.I.G. and Puffy, and shares an instrumental with the "Get Money" remix. "Get Money" has appeared elsewhere in music and in movies.

The song inspired the iconic "Money Nails" design by nail artist Bernadette Thompson, which Lil' Kim wore during a denim shoot in 1999. This look became highly influential in both hip-hop and fashion culture and was later exhibited at the Museum of Modern Art.

== Music video ==
The video was released for the week ending on January 7, 1996.

The video opens with Biggie sitting coolly in court as his defense attorney and the prosecutor have a heated argument in front of the judge, who then threatens to hold them in contempt. Other scenes depict Biggie and his wife (played by Charli Baltimore, intentionally made to look like Biggie's then-wife Faith Evans) and their tumultuous relationship, which ultimately leads to Biggie kicking her out of the house.

Meanwhile, Kim is seen having an extravagant girls' day at a spa with male strippers alongside friends like Salt N Pepa, Vanessa del Rio, Mary J. Blige and Mary's sister LaTonya.

== Single track listing ==
=== A-side ===
1. "Gettin' Money (The Get Money Remix)" (Radio Edit) – 3:59
2. "Gettin' Money (The Get Money Remix)" (Dirty Version) – 4:09
3. "Get Money" (Original Version) – 4:34

=== B-side ===
1. "White Chalk" (Original Version) – 4:40
2. "White Chalk" (Dirty Version) – 4:40
3. "Get Money" (Original Instrumental) – 4:34

== Charts ==
=== Weekly charts ===
Chart (1996)	Peak position
UK Singles (Official Charts) Remix version	63
US Billboard Hot 100	17
US Hot R&B/Hip-Hop Songs (Billboard)	4
US Hot Rap Songs (Billboard)	1
US Rhythmic Airplay (Billboard)	28
US Cash Box Top 100	15

=== Year-end charts ===
Chart (1996)	Position
US Billboard Hot 100	89
US Hot R&B/Hip-Hop Songs (Billboard))	26

== Certifications ==
Region	Certification	Certified units/sales
United Kingdom (BPI) Sales since 2008	Silver	200,000^{‡}
United States (RIAA)	Platinum	1,000,000^{^}
^{^} Shipments figures based on certification alone.^{‡} Sales+streaming figures based on certification alone.
