= Chi Modu =

Nigerian-born American hip-hop photographer

Christopher Chijioke "Chi" Modu (c. 1967–2021) was a Nigerian-born American photographer known for his photos of various pioneering hip-hop music entertainers which "helped set the visual template for dozens of hip-hop stars."

His career as a documentarian included producing photos for The Source magazine in the 1990s, covering "the entirety of hip hop's golden age." Those whose photos he took included Tupac Shakur, Mobb Deep, Eazy-E, The Notorious B.I.G. and many others. Although much of his American life was based in New Jersey, the majority of his photographs were taken in New York City. Some of these images have been released for sale in the form of sweatshirts, hoodies and other garments. Modu collaborated with the Swiss company Yes, Snowboards, to sell snowboards with a picture of The Notorious B.I.G, for which they faced a lawsuit from Notorious B.I.G. LLC, after which Modu countersued.

His 2019 response to how would he like to be remembered was "as someone that can look at something and bring the truth out without injecting their point of view into it."

== Early life ==
Born in Arondizuogu, Nigeria, Modu was a child-immigrant raised in New Jersey. After graduating from the Lawrenceville School in Lawrenceville, NJ, he attended Rutgers University, majoring in economics (Baccalaureate 1989).

His future wife bought him a camera as a birthday present, which led Modu to take formal training at the International Center of Photography in New York). It was in 1991, while employed by the Harlem-basedNew York Amsterdam News, and looking for freelance work that he began his three-decade association with The Source magazine.

== Career ==
Modu introduced his use of the word uncategorized in 2013 via "enlarged photographs .. splashed across the facades of buildings in New York." Other locations included "Oslo, Lagos, Bangkok, São Paulo, Berlin, Barcelona and Dubai" and he described these as "Like graffiti, but legal."

When The New York Times reported in 2020 that eight of his photos had months before been auctioned by Sotheby's, they described it as reaping "the benefits of his work from the 90s." It was also noted that, for those who collect, buy or sell music albums, the covers of some of these were photographed by Modu. One subject, looking back, was quoted as saying that "with Chi ... he cared." NPR called him gifted. A 2019 review of Tupac Shakur: Uncategorized, a 2016-published "coffee table photobook" containing some of Modu's work described its contents as "contemporary moments that later became historical." Some images he recorded in 1994 were used in 2012 by Rolling Stone magazine.

== Legal disputes ==
Modu had valued his 1990s work, and even partnered with a billboard company to display some of these. One such international project reached Finland. Yet, although he "retained the rights to his photographs" and was receiving $3,000 per year in licensing, legal cases existed, including:

- Over a year after Modu's death, a copyright case whose title includes the words "upon Defendant Chi Modu" was still unresolved; his wife was also named in the court filing. Modu had been using a 1996 photo he took of The Notorious B.I.G. "Biggie" to sell Snowboards manufactured by a Swiss company.
- In 2022 Modu's estate filed another case. This one involved Tupac Shakur.
- Copyright vs. "right to publicity."

It was claimed in one of the estate-vs-estate cases that in 2018 Modu had tried to increase his $3,000 per year licensing fee, but Modu's counterclaim, as stated in a legal filing, was that "the right of publicity has been abused."

== Legacy ==
Modu's legacy provides encouragement to other hyphenated-Americans: his dual-success in photojournalism and documenting the birth and growth of hip-hop while staying "rooted and accessible to" those from whose midst he came. One family-oriented accomplishment is that, as a result of his activities, "Brooklyn-born Biggie, also known as Christopher Wallace" met his then-future wife and subsequent widow, Faith Evans.

His 1996 image of a hip-hop star "with the World Trade Center behind him" photographed across a body of water was noted for its iconic value once the bay between them was the only one of these four still in existence. Regarding Modu's statement "I'm not from the hood, but they're my people," a university Africana Studies co-director said that his works "provided a much-needed counternarrative" to the idea that "rappers were to be feared." The Guardian quoted Modu in 2017, regarding how so many African-American performers "live a very short life" that "it's about what you do with the time that you have."

A legacy by Modu to intellectual property owners is the added caselaw by which they are entitled to license their holdings. Two attempts by Modu regarding protecting what he considered his were not successful. The company and the software were acquired by Nielsen Media Research.

== Personal ==
His parents, Christopher and Clarice Modu, who brought their family to the United States due to war conditions in Biafra, returned to Nigeria over a decade later. Modu stayed in America and later married his wife, Sophia, who told The New York Times that Modu's cause of death was cancer. Modu had five siblings and two children.

A resident of Jersey City, New Jersey, Modu died May 19, 2021, in Summit, New Jersey, at age 54.

== See also ==
- Jonathan Shecter
- Ricky Powell
