= I Need You Tonight (Junior M.A.F.I.A. song) =

1995 single by Junior M.A.F.I.A. featuring Aaliyah

Single by Junior M.A.F.I.A. featuring Aaliyah

from the album Conspiracy
- B-side: "Murder Onze"
- Released: August 9, 1995
- Recorded: 1995
- Genre: Hip hop soul
- Length: 4:27
- Label: Undeas; Big Beat; Atlantic
- Songwriters: Christopher Wallace: Patrice Rushen; Paul Anthony George; Brian George; Gerry Charles; Curt Bedeau; Lucien George Jr.; Hugh Clark; Kimberly Jones; Clark Kent
- Producer: Clark Kent

Junior M.A.F.I.A. singles chronology
"Player's Anthem" (1995)	"I Need You Tonight" (1995)	"Get Money" (1996)

Aaliyah singles chronology
"Down with the Clique" (1995)	"I Need You Tonight" (1995)	"The Thing I Like" (1995)

Music video
- "I Need You Tonight" on YouTube

"I Need You Tonight" is the second single released from Junior M.A.F.I.A.'s debut album, Conspiracy. The album version featured Faith Evans singing the chorus, while the single version featured Aaliyah singing instead.

== Background ==
The track was produced by DJ Clark Kent, who sampled the Lisa Lisa and Cult Jam song "I Wonder If I Take You Home" and the Patrice Rushen song "Remind Me".

== Music video ==
The music video featured the members and Aaliyah holding a pool party at Kim's house while she flies to Colombia to negotiate a deal with a drug lord. Actor Thomas Mikal Ford of the sitcom Martin also makes a cameo appearance.

== Reception ==
Though "I Need You Tonight" did not find the success of the album's other two singles, it did become a minor hit on three different Billboard charts, peaking at number 3 on the Billboard Bubbling Under Hot 100, charting there for twelve weeks.

== Single track listing ==
=== A-side ===
1. "I Need You Tonight" (extended radio mix) – 4:27
2. "I Need You Tonight" (extended dirty version) – 4:27
3. "I Need You Tonight" (instrumental) – 4:27

=== B-side ===
1. "Murder Onze" (radio version) – 4:21
2. "Murder Onze" (original version) – 4:21
3. "Murder Onze" (instrumental) – 4:21

== Charts ==
Weekly chart performance for "I Need You Tonight"
Chart (1995–1996)	Peak position
UK Singles (OCC)	66
UK Dance (OCC)	13
US Bubbling Under Hot 100 (Billboard)	3
US Dance Singles Sales (Billboard)	5
US Hot R&B/Hip-Hop Songs (Billboard)	43
US Hot Rap Songs (Billboard)	12
