= Conspiracy (Junior M.A.F.I.A. album) =

Studio album by Junior M.A.F.I.A.
- Released: August 29, 1995
- Recorded: November 1994 – July 1995
- Studios: Sound On Sound (New York, NY); Unique Recording (New York, NY); Quad Recording Studios (New York, NY)
- Genres: East Coast hip-hop; hardcore hip-hop; gangsta rap
- Length: 50:46
- Labels: Undeas; Big Beat; Atlantic
- Producers: Lance "Un" Rivera (also exec.); the Notorious B.I.G. (also exec.); Akshun; Daddy-O; DJ Clark Kent; EZ Elpee; Special Ed; Understanding

Junior M.A.F.I.A. chronology
Conspiracy (1995)	Riot Musik (2005)

Singles from Conspiracy
- 1. "Player's Anthem" Released: May 30, 1995; 2. "I Need You Tonight" Released: August 9, 1995; 3. "Get Money" Released: February 3, 1996

Conspiracy is the debut studio album by American hip-hop group Junior M.A.F.I.A. It was released on August 29, 1995, through Big Beat Records with distribution via Atlantic Records.

The recording sessions took place at Sound on Sound Studios, Unique Recording Studios and Quad Recording Studios in New York City. The album was produced by DJ Clark Kent, Akshun, Daddy-O, Ez Elpee, Special Ed, Understanding, Lance "Un" Rivera, and the Notorious B.I.G., with the latter two also served as executive producers with Craig Kallman. It features a lone guest appearance from Jimmy Cozier.

In the United States, the album debuted at number 8 on the Billboard 200 and peaked at number 2 on the Top R&B/Hip-Hop Albums charts, selling 69,000 copies in its first week. It was certified gold by the Recording Industry Association of America on December 6, 1995, for the sales of 500,000 units in the US alone.

The album was supported by three singles with accompanying music videos: "Player's Anthem", "I Need You Tonight" and "Get Money".

== Critical reception ==
Professional ratings
Review scores
Source	Rating
AllMusic	3/5 stars
Los Angeles Times	2.5/4 stars
The Source	3.5/5 stars

Conspiracy was met with above average reviews from music critics. Nicholas Poluhoff of The Source called it "a solid debut LP, but there are some unoriginal moments that drag it down". Cheo Hodari Coker of Los Angeles Times wrote that "overall The Conspiracy is like watching a kung-fu flick on video: you often have to fast-forward to the best fight scenes to remind you why you wanted to watch it in the first place." Stephen Thomas Erlewine of AllMusic wrote, "Considering Ready to Die was one of the seminal hip-hop releases of the early '90s, Conspiracy could have been an inspired, enjoyable sequel; instead, it's a fitfully successful replication of the earlier record's strengths."

== Track listing ==
No.	Title	Writer(s)	Producer(s)	Length
1.	"Intro"	Lance Rivera	Lance "Un" Rivera	2:42
2.	"White Chalk"	Rayshaun Spain; Antoine Spain; Glenn K. Bolton; Understanding	Daddy-O; Understanding	4:40
3.	"Excuse Me..."	Rivera	Lance "Un" Rivera	0:50
4.	"Realms of Junior M.A.F.I.A." (featuring Jamal and The Notorious B.I.G.)	James Lloyd; Michael Lyons; Christopher Wallace; Jamal Phillips; Renee Scroggins	The Notorious B.I.G.; DJ Clark Kent	4:25
5.	"Player's Anthem" (featuring The Notorious B.I.G.)	Wallace; Kimberly Jones; Lloyd; Rodolfo Franklin; Harvey Fuqua; Lottie M. Wiggins	DJ Clark Kent	5:22
6.	"I Need You Tonight" (featuring Faith Evans)	R. Spain; Jones; Terrence Giddings; Franklin; Patrice Rushen; Brian George; Lucien George; Hugh Clarke; Paul George; Gerard Charles; Curtis Bedeau	DJ Clark Kent	4:28
7.	"Get Money" (featuring The Notorious B.I.G.)	Wallace; Jones; Lamont Porter; James Bedford; Roy Ayers; Sylvia Striplin	EZ Elpee	4:34
8.	"I've Been..."	Rivera	Lance "Un" Rivera	0:35
9.	"Crazaay"	R. Spain; A. Spain; Franklin	DJ Clark Kent	3:58
10.	"Back Stabbers" (featuring Jimmy Cozier)	Jones; Bolton; Leon Huff; Gene McFadden; John Whitehead	Daddy-O	5:34
11.	"Shot!"	Rivera	Lance "Un" Rivera	0:55
12.	"Lyrical Wizardry"	Giddings; Ronald Williams	Akshun	3:52
13.	"Oh My Lord" (featuring The Notorious B.I.G.)	Wallace; Giddings; Edward Archer	Special Ed	3:39
14.	"Murder Onze"	Lyons; Giddings; R. Spain; A. Spain; Williams	Akshun	4:22
15.	"Outro"	Rivera	Lance "Un" Rivera	0:41
Total length:				50:46

Sample credits

- Track 4 contains elements from "UFO" performed by ESG.
- Track 5 contains elements from "La Di Da Di" written by Richard Walters and Douglas Davis and performed by Doug E. Fresh.
- Track 7 contains elements from "You Can't Turn Me Away" performed by Sylvia Striplin.

== Personnel ==
- Rayshaun "Trife" Spain – performer (tracks: 1, 2, 6, 9, 14, 15)
- Antoine "Larceny" Spain – performer (tracks: 1, 2, 9, 14)
- Kimberly "Lil' Kim" Jones – performer (tracks: 1, 5–7, 10, 15)
- Understanding – performer (track 1), additional vocals (track 9), producer (track 2)
- Nino Brown – performer (track 1)
- Bugsy – performer (track 1)
- Mooch Dog – performer (track 1)
- Justice Rivera – performer (tracks: 3, 8), additional vocals (track 9), A&R coordinator
- Christopher "The Notorious B.I.G." Wallace – performer (tracks: 4, 5, 7, 13), producer (track 4), executive producer
- Jamal Phillips – performer (track 4)
- James "Lil' Cease" Lloyd – performer (tracks: 4, 5)
- Cheek Del Vec – performer (tracks: 4, 14)
- Terrence "Klepto" Giddings – performer (tracks: 6, 12, 14)
- Troy Jernigan – additional vocals (track 9), A&R coordinator
- Money L – additional vocals (track 9)
- Jimmy Cozier – vocals (track 10)
- Edward "Special Ed" Archer – performer & producer (track 13)
- Jacob York – performer (track 15), additional vocals (track 9), associate executive producer, A&R coordinator
- Lance 'Un' Rivera – producer (tracks: 1, 3, 8, 11, 15), executive producer, design concept
- Glenn K. "Daddy-O" Bolton – producer (tracks: 2, 10), A&R coordinator
- Rodolfo "DJ Clark Kent" Franklin – producer (tracks: 4–6, 9), mixing (tracks: 2, 5–7, 9), associate executive producer
- Lamont "EZ Elpee" Porter – producer (track 7)
- Ronald "Akshun" Williams – producer (tracks: 12, 14)
- Kenny Ortiz – recording (tracks: 2, 4–7, 9, 10, 12–14), mixing (tracks: 1–3, 6–15)
- Rich Herrera – recording (tracks: 2, 5)
- Tony Smalios – mixing (track 5)
- Rick Essig – mastering
- Craig Kallman – executive producer
- Chris Callaway – art direction, design
- Chi Modu – photography
- Andre Lucy – A&R coordinator
- Rob "Reef" Tewlow – A&R coordinator

== Charts ==
=== Weekly charts ===
Weekly chart performance for Conspiracy
Chart (1995)	Peak position
Canada Top Albums/CDs (RPM)	64
US Billboard 200	8
US Top R&B/Hip-Hop Albums (Billboard)	2

=== Year-end charts ===
1995 year-end chart performance for Conspiracy
Chart (1995)	Position
US Billboard 200	197
US Top R&B/Hip-Hop Albums (Billboard)	53

1996 year-end chart performance for Conspiracy
Chart (1996)	Position
US Top R&B/Hip-Hop Albums (Billboard)	72

== Certifications ==
Certifications for Conspiracy
Region	Certification	Certified units/sales
United States (RIAA)	Gold	500,000^{^}
^{^} Shipments figures based on certification alone.
