= Hard Core (Lil' Kim album) =

Studio album by Lil' Kim
- Released: November 12, 1996
- Recorded: 1995–1996
- Studio: The Hit Factory (New York City)
- Genres: East Coast hip-hop; dirty rap
- Length: 52:43
- Labels: Undeas; Big Beat; Atlantic
- Producers: Jacob York; Carlos Broady; Sean Combs; Cornbread; Jermaine Dupri; Fabian Hamilton; Andraeo "Fanatic" Heard; Nashiem Myrick; The Notorious B.I.G.; Prestige; Ski; Rashad Smith; Stevie J; Stretch Armstrong; Brent "Faraoh" Toussaint

Lil' Kim chronology
Hard Core (1996)	The Notorious K.I.M. (2000)

Singles from Hard Core
- 1. "No Time" Released: October 17, 1996; 2. "Crush on You (Remix)" Released: June 10, 1997; 3. "Not Tonight (Ladies Night Remix)" Released: June 30, 1997

Hard Core is the debut studio album by the American rapper Lil' Kim, released on November 12, 1996, by Undeas Recordings, Big Beat Records, and Atlantic Records. After achieving success with the hip-hop group Junior M.A.F.I.A. and their album Conspiracy (1995), Kim began working on her solo album with the Notorious B.I.G. serving as the executive producer (besides this, he performed on four songs). She collaborated with a number of producers, such as Sean "Puff Daddy" Combs, Stevie J, David "Ski" Willis and Jermaine Dupri, among others. Other rappers, including Jay-Z, Lil' Cease and Puff Daddy were featured on the album.

The album was notable for its overt raunchy sexual tone and Kim's lyrical delivery, which was praised by music critics and is considered a classic album. Hard Core debuted at number 11 on the US Billboard 200 and at number three on the Billboard's Top R&B/Hip-Hop Albums, selling 78,000 copies in its first week, while reaching number 26 of the Canadian Albums Chart. The album was certified double platinum by the Recording Industry Association of America (RIAA).

== Background ==
After making her debut recording appearance on Junior M.A.F.I.A.'s Conspiracy album, Lil' Kim appeared on records by artists such as Mona Lisa, the Isley Brothers, and Total. With recording her debut album, Hard Core was mainly recorded at The Hit Factory in Manhattan, New York City. Working with a number of producers, including Sean "Puff Daddy" Combs and Jermaine Dupri, the album featured edgy hardcore rap and explicit sexuality, as the title suggested, which at the time were two territories that had long been the province of male rappers. The album was originally titled "Queen Bee".

Guest artists included Jay-Z, the Notorious B.I.G., and other members of Junior M.A.F.I.A. The promotional campaign for the album, including the album cover, featured provocative advertisements of Kim dressed in a skimpy bikini and surrounded by furs.

During the recording sessions, Kim and B.I.G made a demo for the track "Street Dreams", never released officially. "Big Momma Thang" was originally intended to be a diss towards Faith Evans and 2Pac but was re-recorded after Biggie disapproved of it. The verse containing remarks against Faith was replaced by Jay-Z's vocals while the third verse, which had a diss on 2Pac, was re-recorded by Kim.

== Singles ==
The first singles from Hard Core, the gold-certified "No Time" peaked in the top 20 of the Billboard Hot 100, top 10 of the Hot R&B Singles chart, and topped the Rap Songs chart, making Lil' Kim the first female rap artist to have two consecutive number-one singles on that chart. Both singles peaked in the top 50 of the UK Singles Chart. A third single, "Not Tonight" (Remix), became a huge top 10 success in 1997, peaking at number six on the Hot 100, number three on the Hot R&B Singles chart, and topping the Rap Songs chart. The single also reached the top 20 on the UK chart and number 10 in Germany. The single was certified platinum by the RIAA. It was nominated in 1998 for a Grammy Award for Best Rap Performance by a Duo or Group. “Big Momma Thang” was released to commercial radio in the fall of 1996.

== Critical reception and legacy ==
Professional ratings
Review scores
Source	Rating
AllMusic	4.5/5 stars
Entertainment Weekly	A
Los Angeles Times	3/4 stars
Muzik	5/10
RapReviews	7/10
The Rolling Stone Album Guide	4.5/5 stars
The Source	3.5/5 stars
Spin	7/10

Hard Core received critical acclaim. The Source called the album "a solid debut because phat beats and rhymes are really all it takes, and they're both present", while Rolling Stone magazine included Hard Core in its list of "Essential Recordings of the 90's". In 2003, PopMatters wrote, "Track for track, Hard Core's thuggette-auctioneering flow melds the perfect hybrid of yoni power Mafioso and Park Avenue duchess." Rolling Stone concluded in reviewing the album in the magazine's 2004 version of The Rolling Stone Album Guide:

Hip-hop had never seen anything like Brooklynite Kimberly Jones at the time of her solo debut: She single-handedly raised the bar for raunchy lyrics in hip-hop, making male rappers quiver with fear with lines like "You ain't lickin' this, you ain't stickin' this . . . I don't want dick tonight/Eat my pussy right" ("Not Tonight"). Riding the wing of Notorious B.I.G.'s Ready to Die and Jay-Z's Reasonable Doubt, Kim's Hard Core helped put East Coast hip-hop back on top in the late '90s. The album's overreliance on old '70s funk samples doesn't detract a bit from the Queen Bee's fearless rhymes: In "Dreams", she demands service fom R. Kelly, Babyface, and nearly every "R&B dick" in the field. A landmark of bold, hilarious filth.

LL Cool J's website rockthebells.com wrote that "Kim's high glamour, sex appeal and commercial success made her a new standard for female rappers." In July 2022, Rolling Stone ranked Hard Core as the 78th best debut album of all time.

== Commercial performance ==
Hard Core debuted and peaked at number 11 on the US Billboard 200 and at number three on the Billboard Top R&B/Hip-Hop Albums chart, selling 78,000 copies in its first week. Despite not spending another week inside the top 30, the album was certified double platinum by the Recording Industry Association of America (RIAA) on March 14, 2001, and had sold 1.5 million copies in the United States by June 2000. In Canada, the album peaked at number 62. As of November 2016, Hard Core had sold over five million copies worldwide.

In August 2018, the album entered the top 10 Hip Hop/Rap Albums chart on iTunes, reaching number six despite the album being released nearly 22 years prior and eventually reached number one for a short time. It also peaked at number 22 on the overall albums chart on iTunes.

== Track listing ==
No.	Title	Writer(s)	Producer(s)	Length
1.	"Intro in A-Minor"			2:14
2.	"Big Momma Thang" (featuring Jay-Z)	Kimberly Jones; James Lloyd; Adrian Bartos; Sylvester James; Harvey Fuqua	Stretch Armstrong	4:17
3.	"No Time" (featuring Puff Daddy)	Jones; Sean Combs; Steven Jordan	Combs; Stevie J	5:00
4.	"Spend a Little Doe"	Jones; David Willis	Ski	5:35
5.	"Take It!"			0:46
6.	"Crush on You" (performed by Lil' Cease)	Lloyd; Andreao Heard; Jeff Lorber	Andraeo "Fanatic" Heard	4:35
7.	"Drugs"	Jones; Fabian Hamilton; D. Owen; Isaac Hayes	Hamilton	4:20
8.	"Scheamin'"			0:49
9.	"Queen Bitch"	Jones; Carlos Broady; Nashiem Myrick	Broady; Myrick	3:17
10.	"Dreams"	Jones; Daven Vanderpool; Reggie Andrews	Prestige	4:39
11.	"M.A.F.I.A. Land"	Jones; Brent Toussaint; Bert Kaempfert; Herbert Rehbein; Richard Ahlert	Brent "Faraoh" Toussaint	4:37
12.	"We Don't Need It" (featuring Junior M.A.F.I.A.)	Lloyd; Jones; Rayshaun Spain; Mark Richardson	Minnesota	4:10
13.	"Not Tonight" (featuring Jermaine Dupri)	Jones; Dupri	Dupri	4:31
14.	"Player Haters"			0:43
15.	"Fuck You" (featuring Trife and Larceny)	Jones; Rayshaun Spain; Antoine Spain; Chris Cresco; Christopher Wallace	The Notorious B.I.G.; Cornbread	2:53
Total length:				52:43

1997 reissue bonus track
No.	Title	Writer(s)	Producer(s)	Length
16.	"Not Tonight" (Remix) (featuring Da Brat, Left Eye, Missy Elliott and Angie Martinez)	Jones; Elliott; Lisa Lopes; Shawntae Harris; Martinez; Robert Bell; Ronald Bell; George Brown; Meekaaeel Muhammad; Claydes Smith; James Taylor; Dennis Thomas; Earl Toon	Rashad Smith; Armando Colon	4:13
Total length:				56:59

Notes

- "Take It!", "Crush on You", "Drugs," "Queen Bitch," and "Fuck You" feature additional vocals by the Notorious B.I.G.
- The intro of "Spend a Little Doe" is performed by Big Troy and Lil' Kim, and its hook is performed by Fela.
- The interlude of "Take It!" is performed by Lil' Cease and Trife.
- "Dreams" features additional vocals and a hook performed by Adilah.
- The hook of "We Don't Need It" is performed by Junior M.A.F.I.A.

Sample credits

- "Big Momma Thang" contains a sample of "Was It Something I Said" by Sylvester.
- "No Time" contains a sample of "The Message From the Soul Sisters " by Vicki Anderson.
- "Spend a Little Doe" contains a sample of "50 Ways to Leave Your Lover" by Frank Chacksfield and His Orchestra.
- "Queen Bitch" contains a sample of "Hey, That's No Way to Say Goodbye" by Roberta Flack.
- "Crush on You" contains a sample of "Rain Dance" by Jeff Lorber.
- "Drugs" contains a sample of "Bumpy's Lament" by Soul Mann & the Brothers.
- "Dreams" contains a sample of "Think (About It)" by Lyn Collins.
- "We Don't Need It" contains a sample of "The One I Need" by Shirley Murdock.
- "Not Tonight" contains a sample of "Turn Your Love Around" by George Benson.
- "Not Tonight" (Remix) contains a sample of "Ladies' Night" by Kool & the Gang.

== Personnel ==
Credits adapted from the liner notes of Hard Core.

- Lil' Kim – vocals, rapping
- Stretch Armstrong – producer
- Corn Bread – producer
- Andraeo "Fanatic" Heard – producer
- Carlos Broady – producer
- Stevie J. – producer
- Fabian Hamilton – producer
- Ski – producer
- Sean Combs (Puff Daddy) – executive producer, additional vocals
- Christopher Wallace – executive producer, additional vocals
- Kenny Ortiz – engineer
- Phil Tan – engineer
- Jermaine Dupri – producer, engineer, additional vocals
- Tony Black – engineer, mixing
- James Cruz – mastering
- Herb Powers Jr. – mastering
- Lil' Cease – additional vocals
- Junior M.A.F.I.A. – additional vocals
- Jay-Z – additional vocals
- LaMarquis Mark Jefferson – bass
- Michael Lavine – photography
- Aaliyah - uncredited background vocals on "Queen Bitch"

== Charts ==
=== Weekly charts ===
Weekly chart performance for Hard Core
Chart (1996–1997)	Peak position
Canada Top Albums/CDs (RPM)	62
UK Albums (Official Charts)	116
UK R&B Albums (Official Charts)	15
US Billboard 200	11
US Top R&B/Hip-Hop Albums (Billboard)	3

=== Year-end charts ===
Year-end chart performance for Hard Core
Chart (1997)	Position
US Billboard 200	66
US Top R&B/Hip-Hop Albums (Billboard)	11

== Certifications ==
Certifications for Hard Core
Region	Certification	Certified units/sales
United States (RIAA)	2× Platinum	2,000,000
