= Player's Anthem =

1995 single by Junior M.A.F.I.A. featuring The Notorious B.I.G.

Single by Junior M.A.F.I.A. featuring The Notorious B.I.G.

from the album Conspiracy
- B-side: "Player's Anthem" (Remix)
- Released: May 30, 1995
- Recorded: 1994–95
- Studio: Unique Recording Studios (New York City)
- Genre: Gangsta rap
- Length: 5:24
- Label: Undeas; Big Beat; Atlantic
- Songwriters: Christopher Wallace; Kimberly Jones; James Lloyd; Rodolfo Franklin; Harvey Fuqua; Lottie M. Wiggins
- Producer: DJ Clark Kent

Junior M.A.F.I.A. singles chronology
"Player's Anthem" (1995)	"I Need You Tonight" (1995)

The Notorious B.I.G. singles chronology
"The Points" (1995)	"Player's Anthem" (1995)	"One More Chance" (1995)

Music video
- "Player's Anthem" on YouTube

"Player's Anthem" is the first single released from American hip-hop group Junior M.A.F.I.A.'s debut album, Conspiracy (1995). Produced and mixed by DJ Clark Kent, the song contains a sample of The New Birth's song "You Are What I'm All About". Featuring a chorus by the Notorious B.I.G., "Player's Anthem" became a big hit for the group, peaking at numbers 12 and 13 on the US Cash Box Top 100 and Billboard Hot 100 charts, and it was certified gold by the RIAA on September 7, 1995 for sales of over 500,000 copies. The remix sounds similar to the original, but samples "Memory Lane" by Minnie Riperton.

The song also contains a sample of Doug E. Fresh's "La Di Da Di" featuring Slick Rick. A French musician, Jérémie Mondon (a.k.a. Demon) contains a sample from this song for the track called, "Streets" for his album, "Midnight Funk".

== Live performances ==
Junior M.A.F.I.A. and The Notorious B.I.G. first performed the song live at the 1995 Source Awards on August 3. They also performed the song live in an episode of The Grind on MTV in 1995, in an episode of Showtime at the Apollo which aired on November 18, 1995, and at Stadion Feijenoord in Rotterdam, Netherlands on July 6, 1996.

== Single track listing ==
=== A-Side ===
1. "Player's Anthem" (Dirty Version)- 5:24
2. "Player's Anthem" (Radio Version)- 4:10
3. "Player's Anthem" (Instrumental)- 4:10

=== B-Side ===
1. "Player's Anthem" (Dirty Remix)- 4:10
2. "Player's Anthem" (Radio Remix)- 4:17
3. "Player's Anthem" (Remix Instrumental)- 4:10

== Charts ==
=== Weekly charts ===
Chart (1995)	Peak position
US Billboard Hot 100	13
US Hot R&B/Hip-Hop Songs (Billboard)	7
US Hot Rap Songs (Billboard)	2
US Rhythmic Airplay (Billboard)	28
US Cash Box Top 100	12

=== Year-end chart ===
Chart (1995)	Peak position
US Billboard Hot 100	72

== Certifications ==
Region	Certification	Certified units/sales
United States (RIAA)	Gold	500,000^{^}
^{^} Shipments figures based on certification alone.
