= Lil' Cease =

American rapper (born 1977)

- Also known as: Cease-A-Leo, Ceaser Alamo, Lil' Ceaser
- Born: James Lloyd; August 20, 1977 (age 49); Brooklyn, New York City, U.S.
- Genre: Hip-hop
- Occupations: Rapper; songwriter; record producer
- Years active: 1994–present
- Labels: Atlantic; Undeas; Queen Bee

James Lloyd, better known by his stage name Lil' Cease, (/siːz/; born August 20, 1977) is an American rapper. Born in Brooklyn, a borough of New York City, he is best known for being a former member of hip hop group Junior M.A.F.I.A.

== Career ==
As part of Junior M.A.F.I.A., Cease's first album Conspiracy was released in 1995. He gained mainstream attention with a memorable verse on "Player's Anthem", the album's highest charting single. Frequent name dropping from mentor and cousin The Notorious B.I.G. throughout Cease's career helped keep the young rapper in the spotlight.

Cease featured on Def Jam's soundtrack for the 1997 comedy film How to Be a Player alongside LeVert, Cam'ron and Mase. He is also known for being a featured artist on Lil' Kim's record Crush on You from her debut album Hard Core, which was a number 1 hit on the Hot Rap Songs chart. Rapper Cam'ron revealed that he wrote the original rendition of the song Crush on You.

After making guest appearances on other artists' albums, Cease released his debut and only studio album The Wonderful World of Cease A Leo in 1999. It peaked at #26 on the Billboard 200 and #3 on the Top R&B/Hip-Hop Albums, and features Jay-Z, Lil' Kim and Bristal. In 2005, Lil' Cease, Banger and MC Klepto reunited Junior M.A.F.I.A. and released the group's second album, Riot Musik. In January 2009, Lil' Cease released "Letter to B.I.G.", which sampled "Letter to B.I.G." by Jadakiss from the soundtrack to the feature film Notorious.

== In other media ==
Lil' Cease is portrayed in the feature film Notorious, the biopic of the Notorious B.I.G., by Marc John Jefferies.

== Discography ==
=== Studio albums ===
- The Wonderful World of Cease A Leo (1999)

=== Collaboration albums ===
- Conspiracy with Junior M.A.F.I.A. (1995)
- Riot Musik with Junior M.A.F.I.A. (2005)

=== Mixtapes ===
- Junior M.A.F.I.A.: The Lost Files (2009)
- Everything Is Hard Body Vol. 1 (2010)
- Lil Cease & the Mafia Dons: Riding for the King with Mafia Dons (2014)

=== Guest appearances ===
Year	Song	Album
1996	"Big Momma Thang" (Lil' Kim featuring Lil' Cease and Jay-Z)	Hard Core
1996	"Crush on You" (Lil' Kim featuring Lil' Cease)	Hard Core
1997	"Cheat on You" (Mase featuring Lil' Cease, Jay Z & 112)	Harlem World
1997	"Love Like This" (SWV featuring Lil' Cease)	Release Some Tension
1997	"Back in You Again" (Rick James, Lil' Cease & Lil' Kim)	Money Talks
1998	"Your Love" (Kelly Price featuring Lil' Cease)	Soul of a Woman
1999	"Future Sport" (Mister Cee featuring Lil' Cease, Redman, Mr. Bristal & Tone Hooker)	How to Rob Cee
1999	"Can I Get Witcha" (The Notorious B.I.G. featuring Lil' Cease)	Born Again
1999	"I'm Going Out" (Mobb Deep featuring Lil' Cease)	Murda Muzik
2000	"Revolution" (Lil' Kim featuring Grace Jones & Lil' Cease)	The Notorious K.I.M.
2000	"Off the Wall" (Lil' Kim featuring Lil' Cease)	The Notorious K.I.M.
2000	"Crime Life" (DJ Clue? featuring Ja Rule, Lil' Cease & Memphis Bleek)	DJ Clue Presents – Backstage Mixtape
2000	"What's His Name" (DJ Whoo Kid featuring The Notorious B.I.G., Lil' Cease, Lil' Kim & Memphis Bleek)	Murda Mixtape
2001	"Chinatown" (DJ Clue? featuring Lil' Kim, Lil' Cease & Junior M.A.F.I.A.)	The Professional 2
2001	"Nothing Wrong" (DJ Clue? featuring Lil' Kim, Banger & Lil' Cease)	Stadium Series Part 1: Mixtapes for Dummies
2007	"Set Us Free" (Ameer featuring Lil' Cease)	The 25th – Hour Enter the Zone
2009	"Talk Go Through Us" (Fabolous featuring Lil' Cease)	Return of Mr. Fab
2010	"R7B Bitch" (BMF featuring Lil' Cease, Blue Davinci & Oweee)	BMF – Street Certified
2011	"Own Man" (Chinx featuring Lil' Cease)	Cocaine Riot
2011	"Smokin Blunts" (Mistah F.A.B. featuring Lil' Cease & Jay Rock)	The Grind Is a Terrible Thing to Waste Pt. 2
2011	"Where You From" (Smoothe da Hustler featuring Trigger Tha Gambler & Lil' Cease)	Violenttimes Day 2
2011	"Company" (Mr. Cheeks & The Lost Boyz Mafia featuring Lil' Cease, B.o.B, L.V. & P. Cardni)	Revolver Edition
2011	"Money All the Time" (F.T (Fuc-that) featuring Lil' Cease)	The Brooklyn Beast
2013	"Bury the Hatchet" (DJ Kay Slay featuring Outlawz & Lil' Cease)	Rhyme or Die
2017	"I Don't Want It" (The Notorious B.I.G. and Faith Evans featuring Lil' Cease)	The King & I

== Filmography ==
- Paper Soldiers (2002)
- Chronicles of Junior M.A.F.I.A. (2004)
- Reality Check: Junior Mafia vs Lil Kim (2006)
- Dave Chappelle's Block Party (2006)
- Life After Death: The Movie (2007)
