= Junior M.A.F.I.A. =

American hip-hop group

- Origin: Brooklyn, New York City, U.S.
- Genres: East Coast hip-hop; hardcore hip-hop
- Years active: 1994–2007; 2019
- Labels: Undeas; Big Beat; Atlantic; Mega Media
- Spinoff of: The Notorious B.I.G. (deceased)
- Past members: Lil' Kim; Lil' Cease; Trife; Larceny; Nino Brown; Chico Del Vec (deceased); MC Klepto/Kleptomaniac; Capone; Bugsy

Junior M.A.F.I.A. was an American hip-hop group from Bedford–Stuyvesant, Brooklyn, New York City. The backronym M.A.F.I.A. stands for Masters At Finding Intelligent Attitudes. They were formed and mentored by New York rapper the Notorious B.I.G. In 1995, they released their debut album, Conspiracy. The success of the group's singles "Player's Anthem" (U.S. No. 13) and "Get Money" (U.S. No. 17) helped launch the career of Lil' Kim as a solo artist.

The group disbanded shortly after the murder of the Notorious B.I.G., with Lil' Kim and Lil' Cease deciding to continue on with their solo careers. In 2005, three of the members released a second album under the Junior M.A.F.I.A. name as a remembrance of the group.

== Formation ==
The members of Junior M.A.F.I.A. met as childhood friends of The Notorious B.I.G. All the members were under the age of 20 when the group was formed. The group was formed from three separate groups and four individuals if not including The 6s, or 666, (Lil' Cease, Bugsy, Capone, Chico, and Nino Brown), The Snakes (cousins Larceny and Trife), (solo artist) Klepto/Kleptomaniac who was responsible for introducing The Notorious B.I.G. to Versace and Moschino styled rap lyrics, Mr. Bristal, Chico Del Vec, and Lil' Kim, (a.k.a. Big Momma and or The Lieutenant), the only female artist in the group. The 6s knew The Notorious B.I.G. before he was rapping. The Notorious B.I.G. acted as the "godfather" to the group.

== Debut ==
The group released their debut album, Conspiracy, in 1995, under the New York City-based Big Beat Records and Undeas Entertainment. The album was produced in a similar style to The Notorious B.I.G.'s debut, Ready to Die "successful[ly] [replicating]... the earlier record's strengths". B.I.G. featured on four of the album's tracks. The rhyme topics were hard-hitting, mostly addressing guns, money, and sex. The album featured production by DJ Clark Kent, EZ Elpee, Daddy-O, Akshun, and Special Ed. Conspiracy gained some positive reviews, but received criticism for some of its group members not showing enough individuality. It debuted at number eight on the U.S. Billboard 200 chart, selling 69,000 copies in its first week of release and was later certified gold.

The lead single "Player's Anthem", produced by DJ Clark Kent and featuring The Notorious B.I.G., went gold. The accompanying video showed the group flying on helicopters and Learjets whilst carrying out business under F.B.I. surveillance. The album also spawned the popular top twenty hit "Get Money", a duet featuring The Notorious B.I.G. and Lil' Kim, and its remix "Gettin' Money", which has Lil' Cease with B.I.G. & Lil' Kim. The single was certified platinum and helped Kim start her own solo career. "I Need You Tonight" (featuring Aaliyah) was the only single released from the album that did not feature The Notorious B.I.G. The music video featured the Klept, Lil' Kim, Trife and Aaliyah holding a house party at Kim's house while she was away.

== Post Conspiracy ==
After the death of the Notorious B.I.G. on March 9th, 1997, the group disbanded. In an interview with the Notorious B.I.G., which was conducted in 1995 but appeared in a 2003 issue of XXL Magazine, he claimed he was planning to retire from rap music in 2000 to manage the careers of Junior M.A.F.I.A. In 2005, three of the previous seven members of the group, Lil' Cease, Klept and Larceny (now known as Banger), released an album, Riot Musik, under the Junior M.A.F.I.A. name. The album did not match their previous success, only making it to No. 61 on the Billboard R&B/Hip-Hop albums chart and No. 50 on the Top Independent albums chart.

Lil' Kim released four albums as a solo artist. The M.A.F.I.A. were referenced on her debut album, Hard Core, on the song "M.A.F.I.A. Land" and featured on "Fuck You". Kim collaborated with Lil' Cease on her single "Crush On You (Remix)" and on the track "Big Momma Thang", from her debut album, also featuring Jay-Z. Lil' Cease's solo effort The Wonderful World of Cease A Leo was released in 1999 peaked at No. 26 on the Billboard 200. The lead single, "Play Around", featured Bristal, Lil' Kim and Puff Daddy and peaked at No. 9 on the Billboard Hot Rap Singles chart. Some of the members of the group went on to other professions. Such as MC Klepto (real name Terrence Harding) is now a New York City real estate broker first working for Shark Tank celebrity investor Barbara Corcoran company Corcoran Group.

In August of 2023 founding member Chico Del Vec died.

== Compilations and conflict ==
In 2004, The Best of Junior M.A.F.I.A (Cleopatra) was released, as well as a DVD directed by documentary filmmaker, April Maiya, titled Chronicles of Junior M.A.F.I.A; a candid documentary dealing with the controversy and conspiracies surrounding The Notorious B.I.G and the Junior M.A.F.I.A. It included unreleased footage of studio sessions and home videos of life with the Notorious B.I.G. and his crew. The DVD release included a free mixtape. A follow-up DVD without the original director was titled The Chronicles of Junior M.A.F.I.A. Part II: Reloaded was scheduled to be released in 2005, but was halted when Lil' Kim filed a $6 million lawsuit against Lil' Cease, claiming she never granted permission for her name and image to be used.

Lil' Cease and Banger (formerly known as Larceny) testified against Lil' Kim during a perjury trial in 2005, which resulted in Kim and the group's manager, D-Roc, being sent to jail. Following the case, Kim labeled the pair "snitches" on her 2005 album The Naked Truth. On June 27, 2006, a second DVD was released that was not as successful as its predecessor, entitled Reality Check: Junior Mafia vs Lil' Kim. The DVD featured the pair explaining their side of the story on the case.

In 2007, Chronicles of Junior M.A.F.I.A. director, April Maiya, teamed with D-Roc for a follow-up tell-all documentary titled Life After Death: The Movie. The film vindicated Lil' Kim's convicted perjury and exposed facts behind Lil' Cease and Banger being labeled as "snitches" in the perjury trial and Hot 97 shootout and corrected the shortcomings in the original 2004 release.

== Discography ==
Studio albums

- Conspiracy (1995)
- Riot Musik (2005)

Compilation albums

- The Best of Junior M.A.F.I.A. (2004)

Guest appearances

List of non-single album appearances, with other performing artists, showing year released and album name
Title	Year	Other artist(s)	Album
"We Don't Need It	1996	None	Sunset Park
"White Chalk, Pt. 2"	1996	None	Original Gangstas
"Fuck You"	1996	Lil' Kim	Hard Core
"Young Cassanovas"	1997	Cam'ron, Mase	How to Be a Player
"Young G's Perspective"	1998	Blackjack	Cell Block Compilation 2: Face/Off
"Biggie"	1999	The Notorious B.I.G.	Born Again
"Do What You Like"	2000	Lil' Kim	The Notorious K.I.M.
"Chinatown"	2001	DJ Clue? Lil' Kim, Lil' Cease	The Professional 2
"Get Up, Stand Up"	2001	DJ Clue?, Lil' Kim	Stadium Series Part 3 Let The Games Begin!
"Just Us"	2006	The Heatmakerz	Pre Crack
"If They Don't Die"	2016	Daddy-O	Daddy-O Presents Junior Mafia And Freestyle Fellowship – Unreleased EP
"Steal & Rob"	2016	Daddy-O	Daddy-O Presents Junior Mafia And Freestyle Fellowship – Unreleased EP

== Filmography ==
- Chronicles of Junior M.A.F.I.A. (2004)
- Reality Check: Junior Mafia vs Lil' Kim (2006)
- Life After Death: The Movie (2007)
- Notorious (2009) as portrayed in the movie
