= The Notorious B.I.G. =

American rapper (1972–1997)

- Wallace in 1997
- Born: Christopher George Latore Wallace; May 21, 1972; New York City, U.S.
- Died: March 9, 1997 (aged 24); Los Angeles, California, U.S.
- Cause of death: Drive-by shooting (gunshot wound)
- Other names: Biggie Smalls; Biggie; Big; Frank White; Big Poppa; MC CWest
- Occupations: Rapper; songwriter
- Years active: 1992–1997
- Spouse: Faith Evans (m. 1994)
- Partner: Charli Baltimore (1995–1997) (Note: Until Wallace's death.)
- Children: 2, including C. J.
- Musical career
- Genres: East Coast hip-hop; gangsta rap; hardcore hip-hop
- Labels: Bad Boy; Atlantic; Arista; Uptown

Christopher George Latore Wallace (May 21, 1972 – March 9, 1997), known professionally as the Notorious B.I.G. or Biggie Smalls, was an American rapper and songwriter. Rooted in the East Coast hip-hop and gangsta rap traditions, he is widely considered one of the greatest rappers of all time. Wallace became known for his distinctive, laidback lyrical delivery, offsetting his lyrics' often grim content. His music was semi-autobiographical, telling of hardship and criminality but also of debauchery and celebration.

Wallace was born and raised in Brooklyn, New York City. In 1993, he became the first artist to sign with Sean Combs's Bad Boy Records and gained recognition for his guest appearances on other artists' singles. His debut studio album, Ready to Die (1994), received acclaim and included the successful singles "Juicy", "Big Poppa", and "One More Chance". Ready to Die made Wallace the central figure of East Coast hip-hop and helped restore its prominence at a time when the West Coast was dominating the genre. In 1995, Wallace was named Rapper of the Year at the Billboard Music Awards, and with his protégé group, Junior M.A.F.I.A.—which included longtime friends like Lil' Kim and Lil' Cease—released the album Conspiracy.

While working on his second album in 1995, Wallace became embroiled in the growing East Coast–West Coast hip-hop rivalry, including a feud with his former friend Tupac Shakur. After Shakur was murdered in a drive-by shooting in Las Vegas in September 1996, rumors circulated suggesting that Wallace might have been involved, given the two artists' feud. On March 9, 1997, six months after Shakur's murder, Wallace was killed in a similar drive-by shooting by an unidentified assailant, while visiting Los Angeles. Two weeks later, Life After Death (1997) was released as a posthumous double album; it debuted atop the Billboard 200, yielded the Billboard Hot 100 number-one singles "Hypnotize" and "Mo Money Mo Problems", and received diamond certification by the Recording Industry Association of America (RIAA).

Three more posthumous albums followed: Born Again (1999), Duets: The Final Chapter (2005) and The King & I (with Faith Evans; 2017). Wallace's certified U.S. sales exceed 28 million copies, including 21 million albums. Rolling Stone called him the "greatest rapper that ever lived", and Billboard named him the greatest rapper of all time in 2015. The Source named him the greatest rapper of all time in its 150th issue. In 2006, MTV ranked him at No. 3 on their list of The Greatest MCs of All Time, calling him possibly "the most skillful ever on the mic". In 2020, he was inducted into the Rock and Roll Hall of Fame.

== Life and career ==
=== 1972–1990: Early life ===
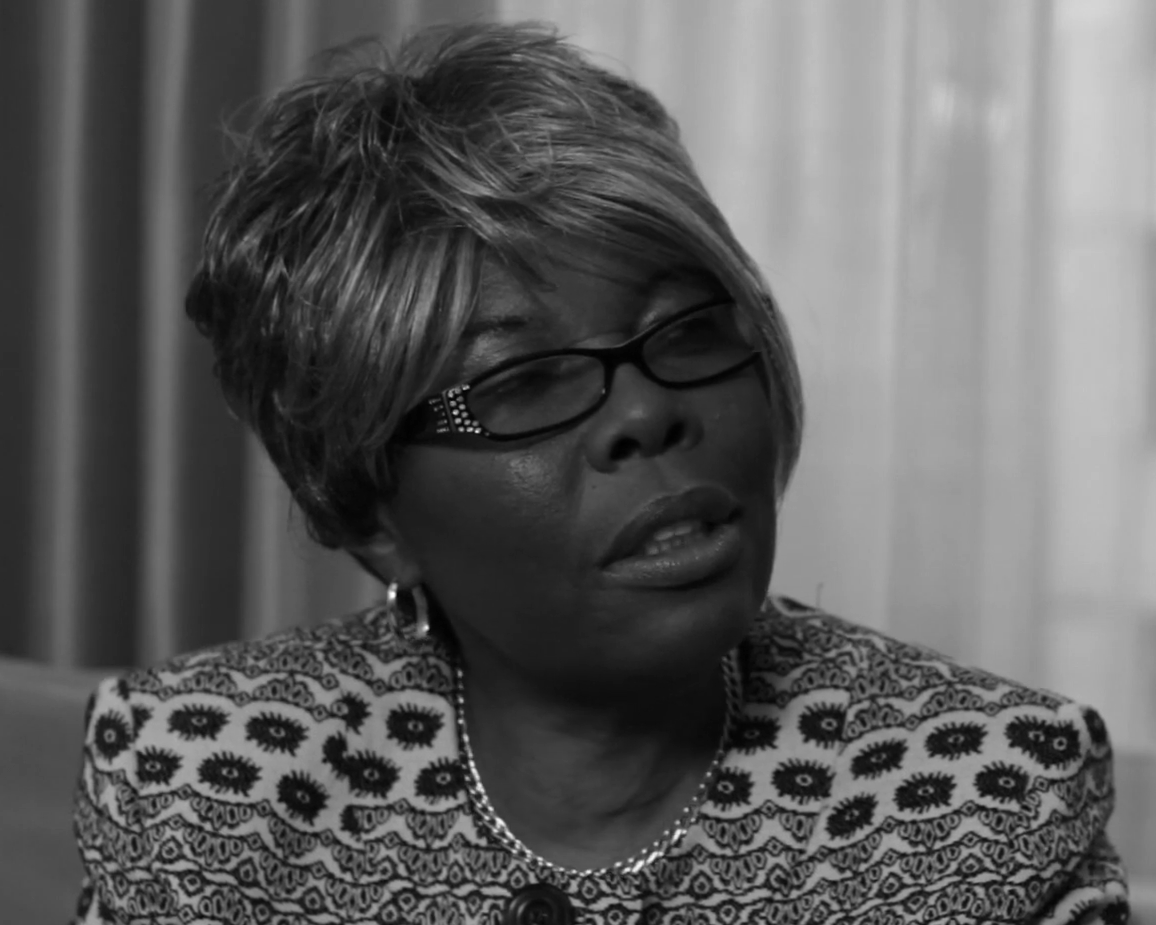
Voletta Wallace in 2012

Christopher George Latore Wallace was born at Cumberland Hospital in Fort Greene, Brooklyn, New York City, on May 21, 1972. Wallace was the only child of Jamaican immigrant parents; his mother, Voletta Wallace (died 2025), was a preschool teacher, while his father, Selwyn George Latore, was a welder. At the age of five, he began attending preschool at Quincy-Lexington Open Door Day Care Center, where he was already bigger than most of the other children. Three months before Wallace's third birthday, his father left the family, leaving his mother to raise him while working two jobs. He grew up in Brooklyn's Clinton Hill, near the border of Bedford-Stuyvesant. As a child, Wallace spent most of his time on Fulton Street, where he was introduced to drug dealing, alcoholism, and gambling. Raised as a Jehovah's Witness, Wallace attended St. Peter Claver Church in Brooklyn, graduating from the parish elementary school in 1982. He excelled in English at Queen of All Saints Middle School. He attended Westinghouse High School, a public school attended by several future celebrities, including Jay-Z and Busta Rhymes.

While attending Westinghouse High School, Wallace weighed 91 kilograms (201 lb), which earned him the nickname "Big". During this period, his interest in drug dealing intensified, having been influenced by the crack epidemic of the 1980s and 1990s. A friend introduced him to buying and selling marijuana when he was around the age of twelve. Having grown up in a strict household, Wallace concealed the money he earned on the roof of his apartment. His mother had no idea about this; she only discovered it when he was twenty years old. Despite being an honor student, Wallace dropped out of school at the age of sixteen due to his growing interest in drug dealing. In 1989, he was arrested in Brooklyn on weapons charges and sentenced to five years of probation. The following year, he was arrested for violating that probation. A year later, Wallace was arrested in North Carolina for dealing crack cocaine and spent nine months in jail before making bail.

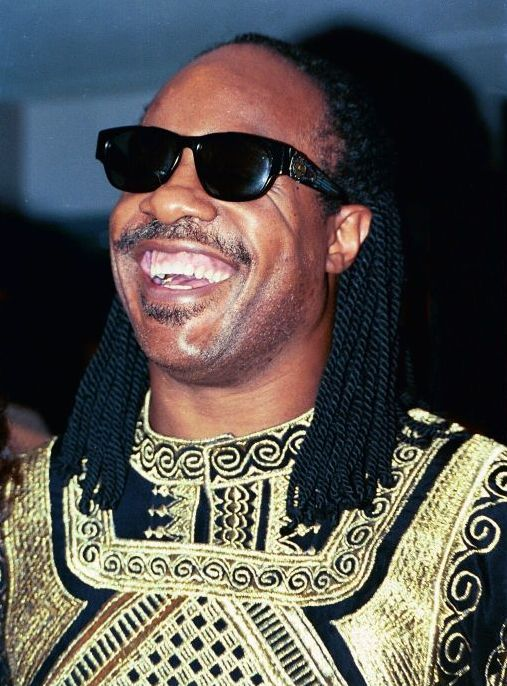
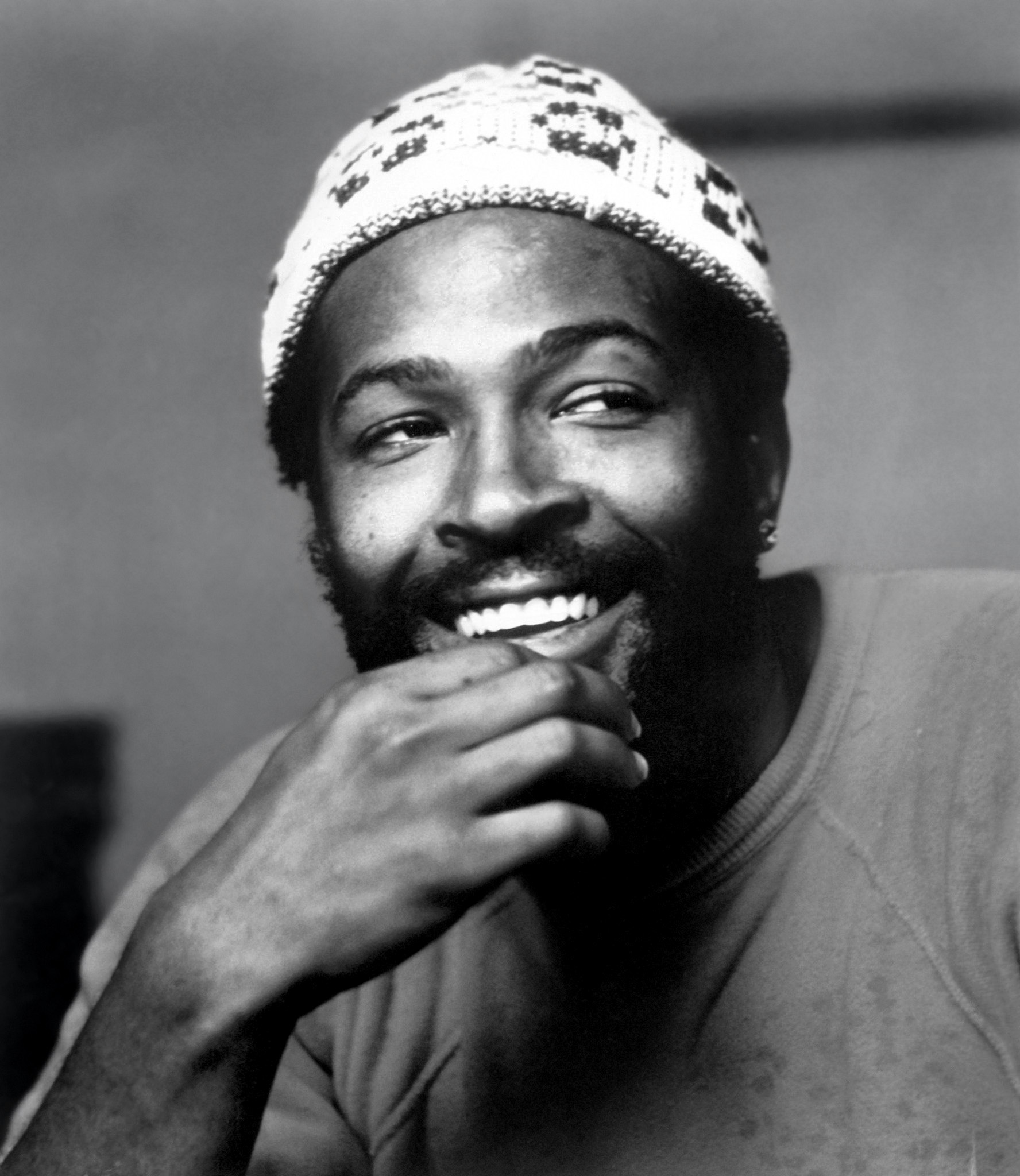
Growing up, Wallace listened to Black artists like Stevie Wonder (left) and Marvin Gaye (right).

Early in his life, Wallace was influenced by Black artists like the Dramatics, Blue Magic, Teddy Pendergrass, Stevie Wonder, and Marvin Gaye. He was also well acquainted with the performances of Parliament-Funkadelic, Earth, Wind & Fire, Kool & the Gang, and Chic. During visits to Jamaica he was influenced by its prominent native genres, including jazz, reggae, soul, and mento. As Wallace entered adolescence, he started listening to artists like Run-DMC and LL Cool J. Wallace adopted the stage name MC CWest and formed the Techniques with his two friends Michael Bynum and Hubert Sams. Wallace met Donald Harrison, a saxophonist from New Orleans, and the Techniques worked on their first songs together at Harrison's home studio. As the trio grew older, their interests shifted; Sams became focused on high school football, while Bynum lost interest in the music industry. Wallace adopted his second stage name, Biggie Smalls, from Calvin Lockhart's character in the 1975 film Let's Do It Again.

=== 1991–1994: Early career and first child ===
After his release from jail, Wallace produced his first demo tape in 1991 called Microphone Murderer with a disc jockey named 50 Grand. Although Wallace reportedly had little ambition for the tape, local disc jockey Mister Cee, known for his work with Big Daddy Kane and the Juice Crew, discovered and promoted it. Mister Cee sent the tape to Matteo Capoluongo (aka Matty C), an editor at The Source magazine, who featured the track in the "Unsigned Hype" section in March 1992, a chart dedicated to showcasing promising rappers. That year, Wallace started gaining exposure; after reading the "Unsigned Hype" section, Sean Combs arranged to meet him. Combs connected Wallace to rhyme on the remix of Mary J. Blige's hit "Real Love".

In 1992, Wallace's girlfriend, Jan Jackson, became pregnant, and he was signed to Uptown Records in March by Combs. Wallace's first chance to record a solo track for Uptown Records, rather than featuring on another artist's remix, came in 1993 when Combs was creating a song for the soundtrack of the hip-hop comedy Who's the Man? The song was "Party and Bullshit", produced by the Brooklyn-based Easy Mo Bee. The song was heavily inspired by "When the Revolution Comes" by the Last Poets, which uses sarcasm, frustration, and humor to critique young Black people's lack of seriousness in the struggle for equality. In the track, vocalist Umar Bin Hassan delivers lines like "niggas will party and bullshit, and party and bullshit". Development on Wallace's first album began at Capoluongo's apartment in late 1992. Wallace appeared on Heavy D & the Boyz's 1992 album Blue Funk, on the track "A Buncha Niggas".

In July 1993—a month before Wallace's first child was born—Combs was fired from Uptown Records by his mentor Andre Harrell, resulting in the loss of access to the songs recorded at that time. Jan gave birth to T'yanna Dream Wallace on August 8, 1993. Wallace promised his daughter "everything she wanted," believing that if he had experienced the same support in his own childhood, he would have graduated at the top of his class. Soon after he was fired, Combs started his own record label, Bad Boy Records, and promptly signed Wallace to the label. Combs discovered that Wallace continued dealing drugs and insisted he stop. When Wallace found out the name Biggie Smalls was already taken, he adopted a new moniker, settling on the Notorious B.I.G. Wallace explained that the acronym "B.I.G." stood for "Business Instead of Game". Combs and Clive Davis, then CEO of Arista Records, reached an agreement in which Davis provided Combs with a $1.5 million advance and full creative control. Combs promptly used the money to repurchase the tracks recorded for Wallace's album from Harrell.

Around this time, Wallace formed a friendship with fellow rapper Tupac Shakur in Los Angeles. Lil' Cease remembered the two as being very close, often traveling together when they were not working. He noted that Wallace frequently visited Shakur's home, and they spent time together whenever Shakur was in California or Washington, D.C. Yukmouth, an Oakland emcee, stated that Wallace's style was influenced by Shakur.

The "Real Love" remix single was followed by a remix of a Mary J. Blige song, "What's the 411?" Wallace's success continued, though to a lesser extent, with remixes of Neneh Cherry's "Buddy X" and reggae artist Super Cat's "Dolly My Baby" in 1993. In July 1994, Wallace appeared alongside LL Cool J and Busta Rhymes on a remix of Craig Mack's track "Flava in Ya Ear", which reached No. 9 on the Billboard Hot 100. "Flava in Ya Ear" reached No. 1 on the rap chart for three consecutive weeks.

=== 1994: Ready to Die and marriage to Faith Evans ===
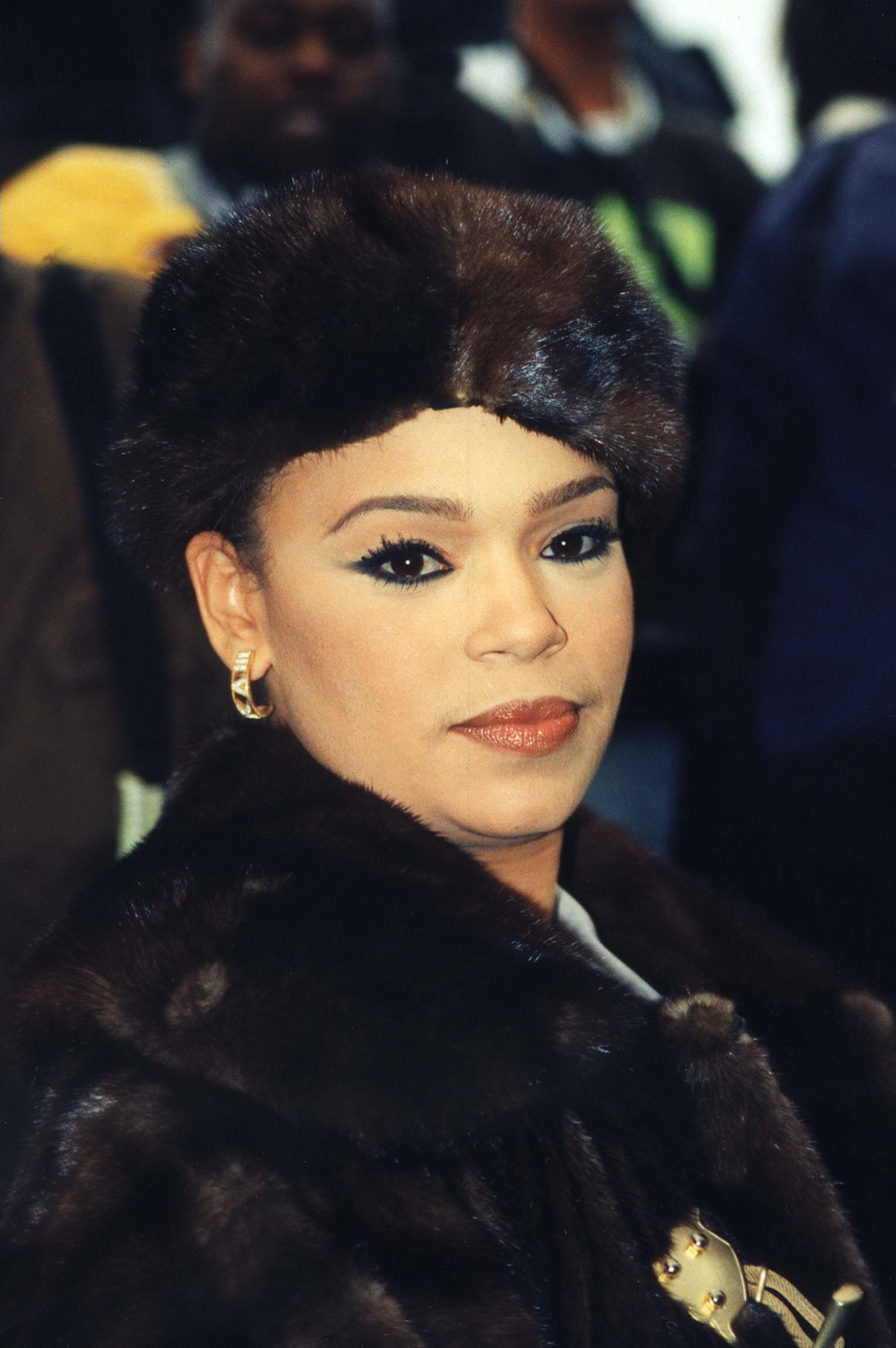
Faith Evans, whom Wallace married in 1994

On August 4, 1994, Wallace married R&B singer Faith Evans, whom he first met in June 1994 at a promotional photoshoot. Wallace and Mo Bee originally wanted "Machine Gun Funk" as Wallace's upcoming album's first single due to its "funky, upbeat" sound, but Combs preferred a "smoother" sound for the release. The upcoming album's first song to be released was the title track, "Ready to Die", followed by "Gimme the Loot", "Things Done Changed", "Machine Gun Funk", and "Warning". Wallace had his first pop chart success as a solo artist with double A-side, "Juicy / Unbelievable", which reached No. 27 as the lead single to his debut album.

Recorded at the Hit Factory between 1993 and 1994, Wallace released his debut studio album, Ready to Die, on September 13, 1994. Inspired by Snoop Dogg's bold, violent, and darkly humorous hit records, Wallace sought to create a similar style with Ready to Die, infused with an East Coast influence. Wallace originally wanted to name the album The Teflon Don, drawing inspiration from John Gotti, who was then making headlines for his ability to avoid legal troubles. Combs disagreed, arguing that the title should make an impact in a way that would "represent for the masses". Wallace agreed to follow Combs' decision, and the two conceived the name Ready to Die.

Ready to Die reached No. 15 on the Billboard 200 chart, sold 57,000 copies in its first week, and was certified four times platinum. The album shifted attention back to East Coast hip-hop at a time when West Coast hip-hop dominated U.S. charts. It received positive reviews upon release and has been widely praised in retrospect. In addition to "Juicy", the album produced two other hit singles: the platinum-selling "Big Poppa", which topped the U.S. rap chart; and "One More Chance", which sold one million copies in 1995 (the year of its release). Busta Rhymes recalled seeing Wallace handing out copies of Ready to Die from his home, which the former saw as "his way of marketing himself". In 1994, Wallace formed the hip-hop group Junior M.A.F.I.A., which included many of his childhood friends, such as Lil' Kim and Lil' Cease. The name is a backronym for "Masters at Finding Intelligent Attitudes".

Wallace also befriended basketball player Shaquille O'Neal. O'Neal said they were introduced during a listening session for "Gimme the Loot"; Wallace mentioned him in the lyrics and attracted O'Neal to his music. O'Neal requested a collaboration with Wallace, which resulted in the song "You Can't Stop the Reign". According to Combs, Wallace would not collaborate with "anybody he didn't really respect" and that Wallace paid O'Neal his respect by "shouting him out". In 2015, Daz Dillinger, a frequent collaborator with Shakur, said that he and Wallace were "cool", with Wallace traveling to meet him to smoke cannabis and record two songs.

=== 1995: Collaboration with Michael Jackson, Junior M.A.F.I.A. success, and coastal feud ===
Junior M.A.F.I.A. began working on their debut studio album in 1994. On August 29, 1995, Conspiracy was released via Undeas Recordings. It achieved gold certification and sold over 500,000 copies in the U.S. The first single, "Player's Anthem", features Wallace, Lil' Kim, and Lil' Cease, and was produced by Clark Kent. The third single, "Get Money", a battle-of-the-sexes track featuring Wallace and Lil' Kim, became their most popular song. "Player's Anthem" and "Get Money" charted within the top 20 in the U.S. and also earned gold and platinum status, respectively. Wallace continued collaborating with R&B artists, working with groups like 112 on "Only You" and Total on "Can't You See", both of which reached the top 20 on the Hot 100. By the end of the year, Wallace had become the top-selling male solo artist and rapper on both the U.S. pop and R&B charts. In July 1995, Wallace appeared on the cover of The Source with the caption "The King of New York Takes Over," a nod to his alias Frank White, inspired by the character from the 1990 film King of New York. At The Source Awards in August 1995, he won Best New Artist, Lyricist of the Year, and Live Performer of the Year, while his debut album was named Album of the Year. He was also honored as Rap Artist of the Year at the Billboard Awards.

In 1995, Wallace became embroiled in the East Coast–West Coast hip-hop rivalry, which involved his now-former friend, Shakur. In an April 1995 interview with Vibe while serving time in Clinton Correctional Facility, Shakur accused Harrell, Combs, and Wallace of having prior knowledge of a robbery on November 30, 1994, during which he was shot five times and lost thousands of dollars' worth of jewelry. They denied any involvement. Wallace stated, "I had nothing to do with that, it just happened to be a coincidence that he was in the studio. He couldn't really say who really had something to do with it at the time, so he just kind of leaned the blame on me". In 2012, Dexter Isaac, who was serving a life sentence for unrelated crimes, claimed responsibility for the attack on Shakur that night, stating that the robbery was orchestrated by entertainment executive and former drug trafficker James Rosemond. After his release from prison, Shakur signed with Death Row Records in October 1995. This made Bad Boy Records and Death Row business rivals, further escalating the conflict between Shakur and Wallace.

In October 1995, Wallace revealed that he still had not received any earnings from Ready to Die, despite the album having sold two million copies at the time. With each CD priced at $15 (equivalent to $33 in 2025), the album should have generated approximately $30 million ($57 million in 2025) in revenue. Amid the rivalry between Wallace and Shakur, many speculated that "Who Shot Ya?", released in late February 1995 as a secondary B-side to "Big Poppa", was intended to taunt Shakur. According to Lil' Cease, the song was not intended to be a comment on the shooting, stating, "He knew that song wasn't about him [...] he was around at that time". Lil' Cease stated that the song was an introduction for Mary J. Blige's second album, however, "the shit was too hard, so Big kept it and said, 'I'm gonna put it out'".

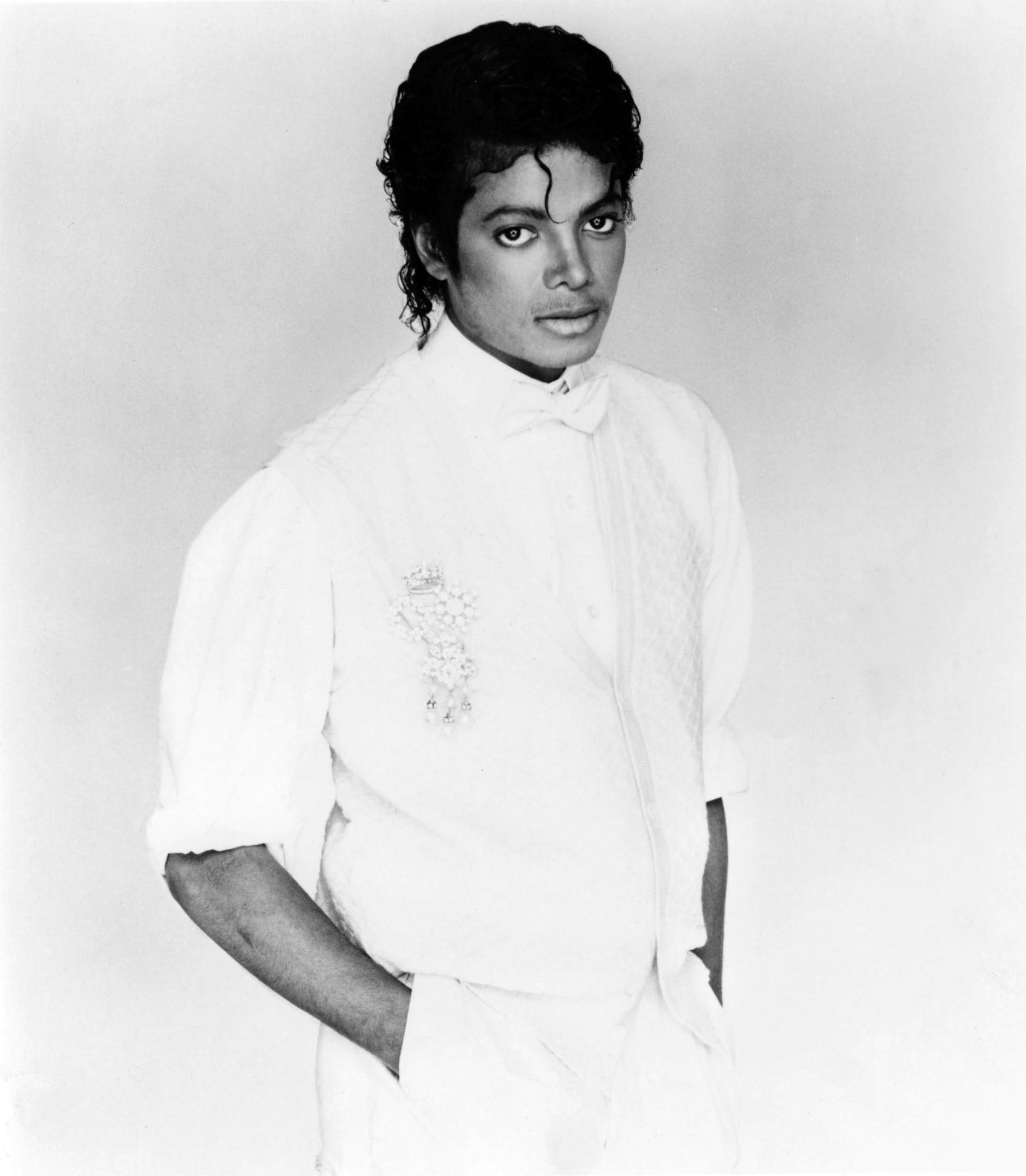
Wallace worked with Michael Jackson on HIStory Continues (1995).

In June 1995, Wallace guest appeared with pop singer Michael Jackson on the album HIStory Continues, providing vocals for the song "This Time Around". Lil' Cease claimed that when Wallace met Jackson, he was made to stay behind, with Wallace explaining that he did not "trust Michael with kids" due to the 1993 child sexual abuse allegations against Jackson. The engineer John Van Nest recalled that Wallace was excited to meet Jackson and was nearly brought to tears when it happened. Wallace began recording his second studio album in late 1995, working on it over the course of eighteen months in New York City, Trinidad, and Los Angeles. The recording process was disrupted by injuries, legal issues, and the publicized hip-hop feud between Wallace and Shakur.

=== 1996: More arrests, accusations regarding Shakur's death and second child ===
In 1996, Lil' Kim became pregnant with Wallace's child while the two were having an affair, but she later decided to get an abortion. Wallace also started a relationship with Charli Baltimore, a Philadelphia native who portrayed Evans in the "Get Money" music video. Although Wallace shared his plans to include her in a supergroup called the Commission, she was aware that she was not the only woman in his life. On March 23, 1996, Wallace was arrested outside a Manhattan nightclub for chasing and threatening two fans who were asking for autographs, smashing the windows of their taxi, and punching one of them. He pleaded guilty to second-degree harassment and was sentenced to 100 hours of community service. Later that year, he was arrested at his home in Teaneck, New Jersey, on drug and weapons possession charges.

At the Soul Train Music Awards in 1996, "One More Chance (Remix)" was nominated for Song of the Year and received the R&B/Soul or Rap Song of the Year award in the same year. In June 1996, Shakur released "Hit 'Em Up". A diss track directed towards Wallace and other East Coast rappers, Shakur claimed to have had an affair with Evans, who was estranged from Wallace at the time, and accused Wallace of copying his style and image. Described as "manic", "Hit 'Em Up" disses Wallace, Combs, and their associates, including Junior M.A.F.I.A., Evans, and Bad Boy Records. In 1996, Wallace collaborated with rising rapper Jay-Z on his debut album, Reasonable Doubt, recording a duet titled "Brooklyn's Finest". The track used humor to address speculation surrounding Wallace and Shakur: "If Faith has twins, she'll probably have two Pacs. Get it? Tu ... Pac's." According to Wallace, humor had always been his way of coping with hardship since elementary school, explaining, "I gotta make jokes about it [...] I can't be the [guy] running around all serious".

I know so many niggas like him [...] so many rough, tough muthafuckas. When I heard he got shot, I was like, "He'll be out in the morning, smoking some weed, drinking Hennessy or whatever." You ain't thinking he going to die.

— Wallace on Shakur's death

On September 7, 1996, Shakur was shot four times in a drive-by shooting in Las Vegas and died six days later. Because of Shakur's accusations in his records, Wallace, along with other New York rappers like Mobb Deep, Capone, and Noreaga, became suspects in his murder. In a 2002 Los Angeles Times series titled "Who Killed Tupac Shakur?", journalist Chuck Philips reported, based on police reports and multiple sources, that the shooting was carried out by the Southside Crips, a Compton gang, seeking revenge for a beating Shakur had allegedly inflicted earlier that day. The report also claimed that Wallace had paid for the gun used in the shooting. The night Shakur died, Wallace called Evans in tears; Evans recalled that "he was in shock [...] and it's fair to say he was probably afraid". Wallace expressed regret over Shakur's death but declined to attend his funeral when asked by a friend. He explained his decision by saying, "[Shakur] made my life miserable [...] he told lies, fucked with my marriage, [and] turned [my] fans against me". The Los Angeles Times editor Mark Duvoisin stated that "Philips' story has withstood all challenges to its accuracy, [...] [and] remains the definitive account of the Shakur slaying". Wallace's family denied the report, providing documents that claimed he was in New Jersey at the time of the incident. The New York Times called the documents inconclusive, stating:

The pages purport to be three computer printouts from Daddy's House, indicating that Wallace was in the studio recording a song called "Nasty Boy" on the night Shakur was shot. They indicate that Wallace "wrote half the session", was "in and out/sat around" and "laid down a ref", shorthand for a reference vocal, the equivalent of a first take. But nothing indicates when the documents were created. And Louis Alfred, the recording engineer listed on the sheets, said in an interview that he remembered recording the song with Wallace in a late-night session, not during the day. He could not recall the date of the session but said it was likely not the night Shakur was shot. "We would have heard about it", Mr. Alfred said.

Wayne Barrow, Wallace's co-manager at the time, stated that Wallace was recording the track "Nasty Girl" on the night Shakur was shot. Shortly after Shakur's death, Wallace met with Snoop Dogg, who claimed he never hated Shakur. During the recording of his second album, Life After Death, Wallace and Lil' Cease were arrested for public marijuana use, resulting in the repossession of their car. Wallace opted to rent a Chevrolet Lumina rental SUV, despite Lil' Cease's concerns about its faulty brakes. The car was ultimately crashed into a rail, breaking Wallace's left leg and fracturing Lil' Cease's jaw. Wallace spent months in the hospital, initially using a wheelchair, later relying on a cane (which he used until his death), and undergoing therapy. Despite his hospitalization, he continued working on the album, referencing the accident in "Long Kiss Goodnight" with the line, "Ya still tickle me, I used to be as strong as Ripple be / Til Lil' Cease crippled me".

On October 29, 1996, Evans gave birth to Wallace's son, Christopher "C.J." Wallace Jr. Around this time, Wallace began recording the songs for Life After Death. The following month, Junior M.A.F.I.A. member Lil' Kim released her debut album Hard Core. Lil' Kim described herself as Wallace's "biggest fan" and referred to herself as "his pride and joy". In a 2012 interview, Lil' Kim revealed that Wallace stopped her from recording a remix of Jodeci's single "Love U 4 Life" by locking her in a room. According to Kim, Wallace told her she was "not gonna go do no song with them", likely due to Jodeci's association with Shakur and Death Row Records. While working on Life After Death, Wallace began to lose weight, losing around 30 pounds (14 kg), according to his mother.

=== 1997: Conclusion of development on Life After Death ===
I called this album Life After Death because when I was writing things like "Fuck the world, fuck my mom, and my girl," There was nothing but anger coming out about everything: about having to go out to sell crack, to hustle for a living. Nothing but anger. But now I can't do that anymore.

— Wallace on the album's title

In January 1997, Wallace was ordered to pay $41,000 in damages following an incident involving a friend of a concert promoter who claimed Wallace and his entourage beat him following a dispute in May 1995. He faced criminal assault charges for the incident, which remains unresolved, but all robbery charges were dropped. Following the events, Wallace spoke of a desire to focus on his "peace of mind" and his family and friends.

The development of Life After Death concluded in January 1997 for a March 25 release. In February 1997, Wallace traveled to California to promote Life After Death. On the morning of February 16, Wallace began preparations for the day's work. He had arrived in Los Angeles two weeks before the Soul Train Music Awards to film the video for his album's lead single, "Hypnotize". The three-day shoot, with a budget of $700,000, was both a promotional effort and a statement of his return to the music scene. "Hypnotize" was officially released on March 4, 1997. It debuted at number two in the U.S. and later reached number one.

After production of the video had ended, Wallace recorded his vocals for Combs' upcoming album, Hell Up in Harlem; following the former's death, the album was retitled No Way Out. He was posthumously featured on the tracks "Victory" and "It's All About the Benjamins".

== Murder ==
Wallace in the iconic King of New York photograph by Barron Claiborne, taken three days before his death in March 1997

On March 8, 1997, Wallace attended a Soul Train Awards after-party hosted by Vibe and Qwest Records at the Petersen Automotive Museum in Los Angeles, California. Guests included Evans, Aaliyah and members of the Bloods and Crips gangs. With over 2,000 people overcrowding the venue, fire marshals shut it down at 12:35 a.m. on March 9. After taking a few photos, Wallace and his crew headed downstairs to the Chevrolet Suburbans they had rented from Budget Rent a Car. He traveled in the front passenger seat alongside associates Damion "D-Roc" Butler, Lil' Cease, and driver Gregory "G-Money" Young. Combs traveled in the other Suburban with three bodyguards. The two trucks were trailed by a Chevrolet Blazer carrying Bad Boy director of security Paul Offord.

Soon after Wallace's Suburban stopped at the red light, a black Chevrolet Impala pulled up to the right side of the car Wallace was in. The Impala's driver, described as an unidentified Black man in a blue suit and bow tie, rolled down his window, drew a 9mm blue-steel pistol, and fired at Wallace's vehicle. Wallace was struck by four bullets. His entourage rushed him to Cedars-Sinai Medical Center, where an emergency thoracotomy was performed, but he was pronounced dead at 1:15 a.m. He was twenty-four years old. An autopsy report, released fifteen years after his death, revealed that only the final shot proved fatal. The bullet entered through his right hip, damaging his colon, liver, heart, and left lung before coming to rest in his left shoulder.

Wallace's funeral was held at the Frank E. Campbell Funeral Chapel in Manhattan on March 18. There were more than 350 mourners at the funeral, including Lil' Cease, Queen Latifah, Flavor Flav, Mary J. Blige, Lil' Kim, Run-D.M.C., DJ Kool Herc, Busta Rhymes, Salt-N-Pepa, DJ Spinderella, Foxy Brown, and Sister Souljah. David Dinkins and Clive Davis also attended the funeral. After the funeral, his body was cremated at the Fresh Pond Crematory in Fresh Pond, Queens, and the ashes were given to his family.

== Posthumous releases ==
Sixteen days after his death, Wallace's second studio album, Life After Death, was released on March 25, 1997. The album achieved four-time platinum certification and became the highest-selling release of the year, tying with MC Hammer's Please Hammer Don't Hurt 'Em (1990) as one of the best-selling rap albums of all time at release. Life After Death debuted at No. 1 on the Billboard 200. It had briefly appeared earlier at No. 176 due to street-date violations. The follow-up single of "Hypnotize", "Mo Money Mo Problems", featuring Combs and Mase, became Wallace's biggest chart success, reaching No. 1 on the Billboard Hot 100, making him the first artist to achieve two posthumous No. 1 singles. The third single, "Sky's the Limit", featuring the band 112, featured a Spike Jonze-directed video with children portraying Wallace and his contemporaries, including Combs, Lil' Kim, and Busta Rhymes. In December 1997, Spin named Wallace Artist of the Year, with "Hypnotize" as Single of the Year.

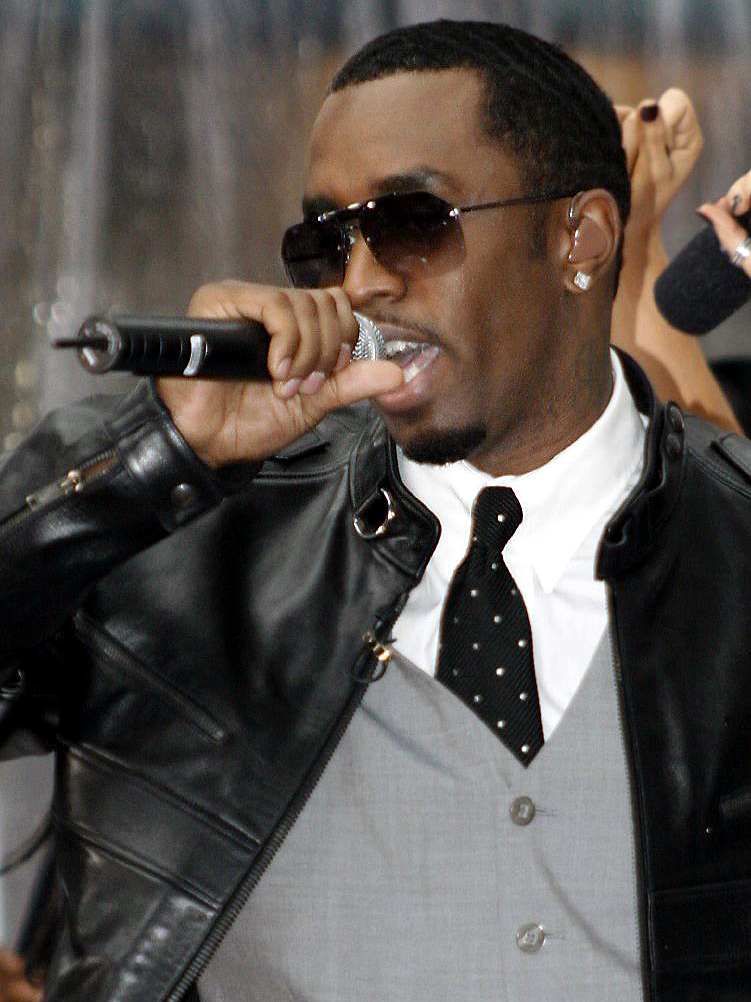
Wallace featured on five tracks on Combs' (pictured in 2006) No Way Out album.

In mid-1997, Combs released his debut album, No Way Out, which featured Wallace on five tracks, including the single "Victory". The album's second single, "I'll Be Missing You", featuring Combs, Evans, and 112, was dedicated to Wallace's memory and became a worldwide chart-topper. At the 1998 Grammy Awards, Life After Death and its first two singles—"Hypnotize" and "Mo Money Mo Problems"—received nominations in the rap category. Combs' No Way Out won Best Rap Album, while "I'll Be Missing You" won Best Rap Performance by a Duo or Group, where Wallace's "Mo Money Mo Problems" was also nominated. In December 1999, Bad Boy Records released Born Again, an album featuring previously unreleased material from Wallace, mixed with new guest appearances from artists he had not collaborated with during his lifetime, including Eminem and Missy Elliott. It spawned two singles: "Dead Wrong" and "Notorious B.I.G.", released on October 26, 1999, and December 11, 1999, respectively. "Notorious B.I.G." peaked at No. 82 on the Billboard Hot 100.

Wallace featured on Michael Jackson's album Invincible, providing lead vocals for the track "Unbreakable", which was released on October 30, 2001. Wallace's vocals appeared on Ashanti's "Unfoolish" in 2002, and the track "Runnin' (Dying to Live)" with Shakur in 2003. Duets: The Final Chapter, a remix album, was released on December 20, 2005, which spawned the singles "Nasty Girl" and "Spit Your Game". "Nasty Girl" features Combs, Nelly, Jagged Edge and Avery Storm, and "Spit Your Game" includes guest appearances from Krayzie Bone, Twista, and 8Ball & MJG. The album peaked at No. 3 on Billboard 200, while "Nasty Girl" peaked at No. 44 on the Hot 100. Combs and Voletta both stated Duets: The Final Chapter would be the last album primarily featuring new material. A compilation album, Greatest Hits, was released on March 6, 2007—three days before the tenth anniversary of Wallace's death. It included tracks like "Juicy" and "Big Poppa", but was criticized by AllMusic for not containing hits like "Mo Money Mo Problems" and "Going Back to Cali". The album debuted at number one on the Billboard 200 chart. On May 19, 2017, The King & I, a duet album featuring Evans and Wallace, was released, showcasing mostly unreleased tracks. The album peaked at No. 65 on the Billboard 200.

== Artistry ==
=== Vocals ===
"Only You (Remix)"
Wallace, accompanied by ad libs from Sean Combs, uses onomatopoeic vocables and multi-syllabic rhymes on his 1995 collaboration with R&B group, 112.

"Niggas Bleed"
Wallace tells vivid stories about his everyday life as a criminal in Brooklyn (from Life After Death).

Wallace had the vocal range of a baritone. He typically rapped in a deep tone that Rolling Stone described as a "thick, jaunty grumble", which became even deeper on Life After Death. Wallace was frequently joined by Combs, who contributed ad libs to his tracks. The Source's "Unsigned Hype" column described his style as "cool, nasal, and filtered, blessing his own material". AllMusic noted Wallace's talent for layering multiple rhymes in rapid succession, while Time magazine highlighted his ability to deliver multi-syllabic rhymes smoothly. Scholar Adam Krims described his rhythmic style as "effusive". Wallace often used onomatopoeic sounds, like "uhhh" at the start of tracks such as "Hypnotize" and "Big Poppa".

Lateef of Latyrx described Wallace as having "intense and complex flows", while Onyx's Fredro Starr called him "a master of the flow". Rapper Bishop Lamont praised Wallace's ability to capture "all the hemispheres of the music". Wallace often employed single-line rhyme schemes to bring variety and depth to his flow. Big Daddy Kane noted that Wallace did not need an extensive vocabulary to impress; instead, he "just put his words together a slick way, and it worked well for him". Known for composing lyrics in his head rather than writing them down, Wallace occasionally deviated from his usual style. For example, he sang in a slow falsetto on "Playa Hater" and adapted to the rapid-fire rhyme flow of Bone Thugs-n-Harmony on "Notorious Thugs".

=== Musical style ===
Wallace's lyrics explored a range of themes, including mafioso narratives ("Niggas Bleed"), reflections on his drug-dealing past ("Ten Crack Commandments"), materialistic boasting ("Hypnotize"), humor ("Just Playing (Dreams)"), and romantic experiences ("Me & My Bitch"). In 2004, Rolling Stone praised him as "one of the few young male songwriters in any pop style writing credible love songs". In the book How to Rap, rapper Guerilla Black highlighted Wallace's ability to "glorify the upper echelon" while also making listeners "feel his struggle". According to The New York Times journalist Touré, Wallace's lyrics "[mixed] autobiographical details about crime and violence with emotional honesty". Another writer for The New York Times, Michel Marriott, noted in 1997 that his lyrics were not entirely autobiographical, as he had a talent for exaggeration to improve his storytelling and sales appeal. Wallace described his debut album, Ready to Die, as "a big pie, with each slice indicating a different point in [his] life involving bitches and niggas [...] from the beginning to the end".

Rolling Stone described Ready to Die as a contrast of "bleak" street visions and being "full of high-spirited fun, bringing the pleasure principle back to hip-hop". AllMusic noted "a sense of doom" in some of his songs, while Jon Pareles of The New York Times described a thread of paranoia in others. Wallace himself stated that he felt "broke and depressed" while creating his debut album. The final track on Ready to Die, "Suicidal Thoughts", portrays a character contemplating and ultimately committing suicide. On his follow-up album, Life After Death, Wallace's lyrics delved even "deeper", as observed by Rolling Stone. Krims observed that the record alternates between upbeat, dance-oriented tracks and gritty "reality rap," reflecting a thematic shift toward a more "pimp" persona. XXL Mag noted that Wallace "revamped his image" between the two albums, evolving from a "mid-level hustler" on his debut to a "drug lord" on his sophomore effort. AllMusic credited Wallace's storytelling ability as a key factor in the success of Ready to Die.

== Legacy ==
Widely regarded as one of the greatest rappers of all time, AllMusic described Wallace as "the savior of East Coast hip-hop". The Source named him the greatest rapper of all time in its 150th issue in March 2002. MTV ranked him No. 3 on their 2006 list of The Greatest MCs of All Time, calling him potentially "the most skillful ever on the mic". In 2012, he was listed on The Source's Top 50 Lyrical Leaders. Rolling Stone hailed him as the "greatest rapper that ever lived", and in 2015, Billboard named Wallace the greatest rapper of all time.

Wallace's lyrics have been extensively sampled and quoted by artists across genres, including Jay-Z, 50 Cent, Eminem, Lil Wayne, Drake, Kendrick Lamar, Ludacris, and Kanye West. Tributes to him have featured prominently in hip-hop culture, such as at the 2005 MTV Video Music Awards, where Combs and Snoop Dogg honored him with an orchestral performance of his songs "Juicy" and "Warning". At the 2005 VH1 Hip Hop Honors, a tribute to Wallace headlined the show. At the same show in 2016, Rich Homie Quan performed "Get Money" but faced criticism after forgetting the lyrics. Before he died, Wallace had begun promoting a clothing line, Brooklyn Mint, focused on plus-sized apparel. The brand became dormant after his death but was relaunched in 2004 by his managers, Mark Pitts and Wayne Barrow, with assistance from Jay-Z. Proceeds benefitted several charitable organizations, including Christopher Wallace Foundation and the Shawn Carter Scholarship Foundation.

The Christopher Wallace Memorial Foundation hosts an annual black-tie charity event, "B.I.G. Night Out", to raise funds for children's educational resources. The acronym "B.I.G." is repurposed to stand for "Books Instead of Guns". In Brooklyn, Wallace's legacy is preserved through art and community efforts. A mural depicting Wallace can be found on Fulton Street, near his childhood neighborhood. In 2019, the corner of Fulton Street and St. James Place was renamed in his honor. Wallace's image and persona inspired elements of the Marvel Cinematic Universe's portrayal of Cornell "Cottonmouth" Stokes in the Netflix series Luke Cage. In August 2020, Wallace's son, C. J. Wallace, released a house remix of "Big Poppa".

=== Biopics ===
Notorious is a 2009 biographical film depicting the life and career of Wallace, starring rapper Jamal Woolard in the lead role. Directed by George Tillman Jr. and distributed by Fox Searchlight Pictures, the film was produced by his managers, Combs, Barrow, and Pitts, and his mother, Voletta. On January 16, 2009, the film's debut at the Grand 18 theater in Greensboro, North Carolina, was delayed after a shooting occurred in the parking lot before the screening. The film grossed $44.4 million worldwide with a $20 million budget, and received mixed reviews from critics.

In October 2007, open casting calls began for the role of Wallace, attracting actors, rappers, and aspiring performers. Beanie Sigel auditioned but was not selected, while Sean Kingston expressed interest in the role, though producers denied his involvement. Ultimately, Woolard was cast as Wallace, and Wallace's son, C. J., portrayed his father. To accompany the film, Bad Boy Records released a soundtrack album on January 13, 2009, featuring many of Wallace's prominent tracks such as "Hypnotize" and "Juicy".

Another biopic, the 2021 Netflix documentary Biggie: I Got a Story to Tell, explores Wallace's life before fame, and features "unprecedented access granted by the Wallace estate featuring rare access and insights". It was executive-produced by Voletta and Combs.

== Discography ==
Studio albums

- Ready to Die (1994)
- Life After Death (1997)

Collaboration album

- Conspiracy (with Junior M.A.F.I.A.) (1995)

Posthumous albums

- Born Again (1999)
- Duets: The Final Chapter (2005)
- The King & I (with Faith Evans) (2017)

== Media ==
=== Filmography ===
- The Show (1995) as himself
- Rhyme & Reason (1997 documentary) as himself
- Biggie & Tupac (2002 documentary) archive footage
- Tupac: Resurrection (2003 documentary) archive footage
- Notorious B.I.G. Bigger Than Life (2007 documentary) archive footage
- Notorious (2009) archive footage
- All Eyez on Me (2017) archive footage
- Quincy (2018 documentary) archive footage
- Biggie: The Life of Notorious B.I.G. (2017 documentary) archive footage
- Biggie: I Got a Story to Tell (2021 documentary) archive footage

=== Television appearances ===
- New York Undercover (1995) as himself
- Martin (1995) as himself
- Who Shot Biggie & Tupac? (2017)
- Unsolved (2018)

== Awards and nominations ==
Awards and nominations received by the Notorious B.I.G.
Award	Year (Note: Indicates the year of ceremony. Each year is linked to the article about the awards held that year, wherever possible.)	Work/Nominee	Category	Result	Ref.
ASCAP Rhythm & Soul Music Awards	2005	"Runnin' (Dying to Live)" (with Tupac Shakur)	Top Soundtrack Song of the Year	Won	
ASCAP Rhythm & Soul Music Awards	2017	—N/a	ASCAP Founders Award	Won	
ASCAP Rhythm & Soul Music Awards	2020	"Sicko Mode"	Winning Rap and R&B/Hip-Hop Songs	Won	
Billboard Music Awards	1995	—N/a	Rap Artist of the Year	Won	
Billboard Music Awards	1995	"One More Chance/Stay with Me (Remix)" (with Faith Evans)	Rap Single of the Year	Won	
Billboard Music Awards	1997	Life After Death	R&B Album	Won	
Grammy Awards	1996	"Big Poppa"	Best Rap Solo Performance	Nominated	
Grammy Awards	1998	"Hypnotize"	Best Rap Solo Performance	Nominated	
Grammy Awards	1998	"Mo Money Mo Problems"	Best Rap Performance by a Duo or Group (with Mase and Puff Daddy)	Nominated	
Grammy Awards	1998	Life After Death	Best Rap Album	Nominated	
MTV Video Music Awards	1997	"Hypnotize"	Best Rap Video	Won	
MTV Video Music Awards	1998	"Mo Money Mo Problems"	Best Rap Video (with Mase and Puff Daddy)	Nominated	
Rock and Roll Hall of Fame	2020	—N/a	Performers	Won	
Soul Train Music Awards	1996	"One More Chance/Stay With Me (Remix)" (with Faith Evans)	R&B/Soul or Rap Song of the Year	Won	
Soul Train Music Awards	1998	Life After Death	Best R&B/Soul Album – Male	Won	
Soul Train Music Awards	1998	Life After Death	R&B/Soul or Rap Song of the Year	Nominated	
Soul Train Music Awards	1998	"Mo Money Mo Problems" (with Mase and Puff Daddy)	Best R&B/Soul or Rap Music Video	Nominated	
The Source Hip-Hop Music Awards	1995	—N/a	New Artist of the Year, Solo	Won	
The Source Hip-Hop Music Awards	1995	—N/a	Lyricist of the Year	Won	
The Source Hip-Hop Music Awards	1995	—N/a	Live Performer of the Year	Won	
The Source Hip-Hop Music Awards	1995	Ready to Die	Album of the Year	Won	

== See also ==
- List of murdered hip-hop musicians
