= African-American organized crime =

African American organized crime
- Founded: Late 19th century
- Founding location: United States
- Years active: Late 19th century – present
- Territory: Active in most United States metropolitan areas
- Ethnicity: African American
- Criminal activities: Drug trafficking, weapon trafficking, robbery, contract killing, money laundering, racketeering, extortion, illegal gambling, murder

In the late 19th and early 20th centuries, African American organized crime emerged following the first and second large-scale migrations of African Americans from the Southern United States to major cities of the Northeast, Midwest, and later the West Coast. In many of these newly established communities and neighborhoods, criminal activities such as illegal gambling (e.g. the numbers racket) and speakeasies were seen in the post-World War I and Prohibition eras. Although the majority of these businesses in African-American neighborhoods were operated by African-Americans, it is often unclear the extent to which these operations were run independently of the larger criminal organizations of the time.

== History ==
=== Origin and the role of segregation ===
Freedman alongside fugitive slaves formed the first African-American community in Chicago in the 1840s. With the start of World War I, larger numbers of African Americans moved into Chicago. The war opened up numerous jobs, causing 50,000 African Americans to move into Chicago from 1916 to 1920, with 90% of the population being on Chicago's South Side. The South Side of Chicago grew to house a population of around 300,000 African Americans. Between 1919-1922, known as Red Summer, there was a large swell of migration north to escape Klan violence in the south It was very easy for Blacks to move into Chicago's South Side, but discrimination and segregation made it difficult for them to move to other parts of the city.

There is not much published information on Black American organized crime groups, especially between the years of 1890 and 1960. Analysis of Blacks in Chicago support evidence that the lack of information is connected to the segregation of the time. Chicago's South Side had its own way of life completely separate to that of "white" Chicago, therefore organized crime happening on the South Side was most likely not heavily reported on.

Early Black American crime had a major focus on gambling in saloons and then jazz clubs and speakeasies. Policy gambling, similar to Numbers Game, became increasingly popular in Chicago's South Side.

=== Prohibition and the Great Depression ===
==== New York ====
During the 1920s and 1930s, African American organized crime was centered in New York's Harlem, the largest black city in the world, where the numbers racket was largely controlled by Casper Holstein and the "Madam Queen of Policy", Stephanie St. Clair. St. Clair later testified at the Seabury Investigation that, during 1923 to 1928, the NYPD continued to arrest her number runners despite her making payoffs. At that time, Harlem numbers rackets were largely operated by independent policy bankers such as St. Clair; the Harlem rackets later began to receive more protection from police interference following their eventual (partial) takeover by mobster Dutch Schultz and the largely Italian and Jewish "National Crime Syndicate" in the late 1930s.

==== Chicago ====
Prohibition in the 1920s increased criminal activity in Chicago's South Side. There was a deep connection between politics and organized crime. Black nightclubs were run by Black Republican Party organizers and Daniel McKee Jackson, said to be the most powerful vice-king in Black Chicago, was a candidate for state representative.

In 1921, Chicago's South Side was struggling with widespread gambling and other forms of criminal activity. Chicago Blacks were able to have such success in the gambling business due to their connection with Republican mayor of Chicago, William Hale Thompson, who treated Blacks more equitably than his predecessors and recognized that Black gamblers greatly supported their local government. But in 1931, Thompson lost re-election to Anton Cermak. The Black gamblers eventually left the Republican party to join Cermak's Democratic fold, where they had to pay him bribes to keep operating. When Cermak died, Edward Kelly became mayor and allowed gambling along with other criminal activity to return to the South Side.

=== Post-World War II ===
Prison sometimes played a role in creating African-American organized crime groups in the post-WWII era. Connections made in prison strengthened connections outside of prison among ex-convicts.

==== New York ====
In the years following the end of the World War II, Black American organized crime grew along with the rise of Black American social consciousness and later political, social and economic upward mobility. The Black American gangster Bumpy Johnson established close ties with the New York Italian-American Mafia and Jewish Mob in the post-war years, establishing some degree of independence for Black American organized crime groups in Harlem from the dominant New York organized crime groups. Many of the major drug traffickers in the United States emerged during the early-to-mid-1960s, such as Leroy "Nicky" Barnes, Guy Fisher, and Frank Lucas, taking advantage of the increasing political strength during the civil rights movement.

Previously dependent partially on the political and police protection of New York's Five Families, Black American gangsters were able to negotiate with outside criminal organizations and establish a stronger independent hold over certain territories, and the Mafia's ability to control or impose a "street tax" on criminal operations in Black American neighborhoods began to wane. Black American and Italian-American organized crime groups in the Northeast and Midwest instead began to cooperate (and at times compete) to a greater extent than in previous decades, increasingly sharing profits and coordinating rackets.

By the early 1970s, the large narcotics empires created by Nicky Barnes, Frank Matthews, and Frank Lucas began expanding beyond Harlem as Lucas sought to ultimately control a large-scale drug trafficking operation by gaining control of a network from Indochina directly to the streets of ghettos across the country. Other criminal groups started smuggling marijuana and cocaine in cities including New York City, Baltimore, Washington, D.C. as well as in New Jersey, California, Florida and Toronto, Ontario, Canada.

==== California ====
In the 1940s, thousands of black Americans migrated from the South into Los Angeles for World War II jobs. Overcrowding became a huge issue, especially since legalized restrictive covenants kept blacks from moving into other areas of LA. Violent clashes arose between the black and White populations. Black gangs were created as protection against White violence; they first arose on the Eastside of LA before extending south and west.

Eventually, White residents began moving out of South Los Angeles into the suburbs. In the early 1960s, black gang violence continued to grow as Whites left the area. The black gangs, which started as protection groups, began fighting each other. However, in 1965 after the Watts Rebellion, much of the violence between the gangs dissipated. Members instead focused on fighting police brutality and other social injustices. Black gang activity declined in the years following with a turn towards political advocacy.

But by the late 1960s, new street gangs emerged as black consciousness fell away with political leadership. Immature teens without leadership soon became involved in criminal activity and by 1972 one of the first gang murders of the time took place. Many factors, including severe radicalization, caused these violent street gangs to surface, one such gang being the well-known Crips.

By the 1990s, over 270 gangs emerged and an epidemic of homicides emerged.

On the West Coast in Oakland, California, Felix Mitchell and his 69 Mob ran a large scale drugs trafficking operation, generating income of nearly a million dollars in monthly business.

==== Other areas ====
According to a United States Senate sub-committee on organized crime during the 1980s, one of the most sophisticated, corporate-like, structured, organized crime groups outside of the Italian mafia was the Young Boys Inc. (YBI). Founded by a small group of teen-aged friends on Detroit's west side in the mid-1970s, in less than two years, YBI took over the majority of Southeast Michigan's heroin trade with absolutely no interference from any other crime groups.

At its peak, YBI sales were an estimated $300,000 a day. The murder of one of the founders, Dwayne Davis (Wonderful Wayne), and a series of federal indictments on 2 of the remaining bosses and 40 of the top lieutenants crippled YBI in 1982. There were a few lieutenants who survived, one in particular carried on the organization in Detroit and Boston through the late 1980s until crack cocaine became the drug of choice over heroin.

== African-American gangs ==
=== Black Mafia ===
The Black Mafia was an African-American crime group located in Philadelphia. Founded in 1968, they were known for narcotics, the numbers racket, misusing government funds, extortion, murder, and more.

The group didn't target everyday citizens, but targeted other criminals. They were known for their violent crimes and used murder as a means to keep that reputation. They used the numbers racket to control their territories and gambling. They also created fake community groups, such as the Council for Youth and Urban Development as fronts to receive government funding.

The Black Mafia also had members that were linked to the Nation of Islam. They also took over the heroin trade and extorted other groups. Later, a younger group paying homage to the Black Mafia named themselves the Junior Black Mafia and were also heavily involved in drug trafficking, specifically crack-cocaine, during the mid-1980s to early 1990s.

The Black Mafia is no longer active and was succeeded by the Junior Black Mafia.

=== Bloods ===
The Bloods are a Black American street gang that was formed in Los Angeles in the 1970s. They are known to be extremely violent. They were originally formed as a protection against another street gang, the Crips. These street gangs remain rivals to this day.

During the 1980s the Bloods were involved in the distribution of crack cocaine (the crack epidemic), which allowed them to grow and become more powerful.

The Bloods eventually spread outside Los Angeles, developing chapters along the East Coast. These chapters became known as The United Blood Nation (UBN). A chapter, known as the East Coast Bloods, also developed within the New York City Department of Corrections in 1993. Today there are likely Bloods in every state. Despite certain cultural similarities, these chapters have many differences and run completely independent of each other. The Bloods are widely associated with the color red and are still active today.

=== Crips ===
The Crips are a Black American street gang that was formed in Los Angeles in the 1960s. Much like their rivals, the Bloods, they are known for their violence and are also involved in large-scale drug trafficking including crack cocaine.

The Crips have spread outside of Los Angeles, establishing chapters across the nation, including in Anchorage.

They are widely associated with the color blue and are still active today.

=== Gangster Disciples ===
The Gangster Disciples are one of the largest and most influential crime groups in Chicago and their membership even extends outside of Chicago. They are a Black American crime group formed in the 1970s after splitting from the Black Disciples. In the 1960s the Gangster Disciples and the Black Disciples operated together under the Black Gangster Disciple Nation, but after the split in 1972, the two groups violently fought over territory. The Gangster Disciples are structured similarly to corporate enterprises while the Black Disciples are structured similarly to religions. They are still rivals today. The Gangster Disciples have other rivals, including the Black P Stones and Latin Kings.

== Popular culture ==
=== Film and television ===
- Shaft (1971)
- Across 110th Street (1972)
- Black Caesar (1973)
- Hell Up in Harlem (1973)
- Live and Let Die (1973)
- Black Belt Jones (1974)
- The Black Godfather (1974)
- Coonskin (1975)
- J. D.'s Revenge (1976)
- Black Heat (1976)
- The Warriors (1979)
- Colors (1988)
- Harlem Nights (1989)
- New Jack City (1991)
- Sugar Hill (1994)
- Pulp Fiction (1994)
- Oz (1997–2003)
- Hoodlum (1997)
- Belly (1998)
- Hot Boyz (1999)
- Romeo Must Die (2000)
- Training Day (2001)
- Made (2001)
- Bones (2001)
- Paid in Full (2002)
- The Shield (2002–2008)
- The Wire (2002–2008)
- Assault on Precinct 13 (2005)
- Carlito's Way: Rise to Power (2005)
- Four Brothers (2005)
- Get Rich or Die Tryin' (2005)
- Waist Deep (2006)
- American Gangster (2006–2009)
- American Gangster (2007)
- Gangland (2007–2010)
- Mr. Untouchable (2007)
- The Dark Knight (2008)
- Sons of Anarchy (2008–2014)
- Before I Self Destruct (2009)
- Boardwalk Empire (2010–2014)
- Person of Interest (2011)
- Snowfall (2017–2023)
- Power (2014–2020)
- The Grid (2017)
- Superfly (2018)
- Godfather of Harlem (2019)
- Fargo (2020)
- The Many Saints of Newark (2021)
- BMF (2021)

=== Influence on music ===
- Black organized crime is a frequent topic in rap and hip-hop music, particularly in the subgenres of gangsta rap.
- In the song "Ghetto Qu'ran" rapper 50 Cent mentions several drug dealing figures in his neighborhood, including the notorious Kenneth "Supreme" McGriff. It is believed that this song led to the murder of Jam Master Jay and the shooting of 50 Cent himself.
- Demetrius "Big Meech" Flenory, leader of the Black Mafia Family, was known to be good friends with Fabolous, Jay-Z, Puff Daddy (Big Meech's bodyguard was Puff Daddy's ex-bodyguard), Young Jeezy, and a number of other high-profile rappers. The BMF organization is largely responsible for giving Young Jeezy "street credibility", which translates to high album sales in the rap world, by showing up in the hundreds to his shows towards the beginning of his career.

=== Portrayal in video games ===
- Grand Theft Auto III (2001) has several missions provided to the player by D-Ice, the incarcerated leader of the Red Jacks, a gang involved in a turf war with a rival group called the Purple Nines. they also appear in Grand Theft Auto Liberty City Stories (2005)
- Grand Theft Auto: San Andreas (2004) is extensively centered on Black American organized crime, with many of the gangs being based on real-life gangs such as Bloods, Crips, and Mexican street gangs.
- Grand Theft Auto IV (2008) has missions provided to the player by Playboy X the leader of a gang called the North Holland Hustlers.
- Saints Row (2006) features the Vice Kings, a street gang/crime syndicate involved in arms trafficking, drug dealing, gambling, and prostitution, and are also involved in the music industry through a front company called Kingdom Come Records. They serve as antagonists alongside the Westside Rollerz and Los Carnales.
- Mafia II (2010) features a small gang called the Bombers who appear in a few missions and the DLC "Jimmy's Revenge". For the most part, the Bombers are small in number and lack the notoriety of other criminal groups present in Empire Bay.
- Grand Theft Auto V (2013) is mostly centered around Black American organized crime, with one of the main protagonists of the game, Franklin Clinton, being part of a Black American gang.
- Among the antagonists in Watch Dogs (2014) are the Black Viceroys, who were originally a civil-rights group until they turned to crime after their founder was murdered. Under their current leader, army veteran Delford "Iraq" Wade, the Viceroys have become one of Chicago's most powerful criminal outfits, with Iraq training a select number of members in advanced combat and communication techniques. He also forms an alliance with the Chicago South Club, an Irish Mob group, to provide security for Club operations. The majority of the Viceroys' revenue stems from traditional drug manufacturing and marketing operations, but also includes embezzlement, extortion, bribery, kidnapping, and even cybercrime. It is stated in the game that Iraq's vast collection of blackmail is the only reason the local authorities have not made much of an effort to stamp out the Viceroys.
- In Mafia III (2016), the protagonist Lincoln Clay is a member of the Robinson clan, a black mafia family in a fictionalized New Orleans, who are later massacred by Italian-American mobsters who give their territories over to the Dixie Mafia. The game also features a Haitian mafia led by Cassandra, a Haitian mambo. They specialize in gun-running and marijuana trafficking, and initially oppose Lincoln until he absorbs them into his criminal empire. However, if he chooses to antagonize them by denying them new territories, they may break their alliance and declare war on him.

== See also ==
- List of Black American gangs in the United States
- List of criminal organizations § African-American organized crime
