= May 3rd Films =

May 3rd Films, LLC
- Company type: Limited liability company Subsidiary of May 3rd Media
- Industry: Motion pictures
- Founded: 2003
- Founder: Kirk Fraser
- Headquarters: Washington DC
- Website: may3rdfilms.com

May 3rd Films is a film and television production company founded in 2003 by noted filmmaker Kirk Fraser.

== History ==
May 3rd Films feature documentary debut, The Life of Rayful Edmond. was released to high acclaims and considered by critics as a success. Following the success of true-crime stories, pre-production started the Winter of 2006 on the life of Len Bias. During the 2008 Sundance Film Festival the Len Bias film was promoted with a guerilla marketing tactics that landed a deal with ESPN. In 2009 the Len Bias film won the Jury Prize for Best Documentary at the 13th Annual American Black Film Festival. The titled was later changed to Without Bias and aired as part of ESPN documentary 30 for 30 series. May 3rd Films also has produced several television shows for Black Entertainment Television, Fox Sports Networks, TV One, and ESPN.

== List of Films by May 3rd Films ==
- The Life of Rayful Edmond (2005)
- 30 for 30 Without Bias (2009)

== List of Television Shows by May 3rd Films ==
- American Gangster (2006–2008) TV Series
- Lil' Kim: Countdown to Lockdown (2006) TV Series
- Party Boyz (2009) TV Special

== List of Webisode by May 3rd Films ==
- Mayor For Life (2010) Web Series

== Awards and nominations ==
Year	Award	Result	Category	Series
2006	Urban DVD Awards	Won	Best Documentary	The Life of Rayful Edmond
2009	American Black Film Festival	Won	Best Documentary	Without Bias
2010	Black Reel Awards	Won	Best Documentary	Without Bias
2010	The New York Festivals	Won	Television & Film Community Portraits	Without Bias
2010	Sports Emmy Award	Nominated	Outstanding Sports Documentary	Without Bias 30 for 30
2010	Peabody Award	Won	Outstanding Documentary	ESPN Films 30 for 30
