= American Gangster (TV series) =

- Narrated by: Ving Rhames
- Country of origin: United States
- No. of seasons: 3
- No. of episodes: 26

Production
- Executive producers: Nelson George; Jonathan Koch; Steven Michaels; Frank Sinton; Arthur Smith (season 2–3); Kent Weed (season 2–3)
- Running time: 60 minutes
- Production companies: Asylum Entertainment; A. Smith & Co Productions (season 2–3)

Original release
- Network: BET
- Release: November 28, 2006 – January 5, 2009

American Gangster is a documentary television series that aired on BET. The show features some of Black America's most infamous and powerful gangsters and organized crime groups. It is narrated by Ving Rhames. The series premiere, on November 28, 2006, amassed around one million viewers. The first season ended on January 9, 2007, and comprised 6 episodes; a season 1 DVD was released on October 23, 2007. The second season aired October 3, 2007; a season 2 DVD was released on June 10, 2008. In April 2009, A&E Networks purchased the rights to air seasons 1–3 on their networks. They can be seen primarily on the Bio Channel and the flagship A&E Channel. They can also be seen on A&E's Crime and Investigation Network.

== Gangsters featured in series ==
- Leroy "Nicky" Barnes - Harlem heroin dealer
- The Detroit Chambers Brothers - Detroit crack dealing gang
- D.C. Snipers (aka Beltway Snipers/John Allen Muhammad/Lee Boyd Malvo)
- Larry Davis - New York City suspect in seven murders, known for shootout with police and evading capture for 17 days. With over 2 million viewers tuning in, Season 3 Episode 1 "Larry Davis" was the highest rated episode in BET history.
- Mac Dre & The Romper Room Gang - rapper with ties to robbery gang
- Rayful Edmond - Washington, D.C. crack dealer
- Guy Fisher - Harlem heroin dealer and former partner of Leroy "Nicky" Barnes
- Jeff Fort - co-founder of the Black P. Stones gang. Convicted in 1987 of conspiring with Libya to perform acts of domestic terrorism
- Larry Hoover - leader of the Gangster Disciples
- Cornell Jones - Washington, D.C. cocaine dealer
- Luis Felipe - Founder of the Bloodline Latin Kings in New York.
- Willie Lloyd - Leader of the Vice Lords
- Sean Lorenzo- OG Washington, D.C. - Filmmaker/Rap Artist
- Frank Lucas - Harlem heroin dealer
- Kenneth "Supreme" McGriff - Queens drug dealer. Leader of The Supreme Team
- Felix Mitchell - Oakland drug dealer and leader of 69 Mob
- Robert "Midget" Molley - Atlantic City cocaine dealer
- Lorenzo "Fat Cat" Nichols - Queens cocaine dealer
- Philly Black Mafia - Philadelphia-based organized crime syndicate
- Ricky Ross - L.A. crack dealer
- "Monster" Kody Scott - infamous member of Eight Tray Gangster Crips and author
- Shower Posse - Jamaican posse involved with drug and arms smuggling in Jamaica, New York, New Jersey and Pennsylvania
- The Smith Brothers - San Francisco jewellery store robbers
- Chaz Williams - Queens bank robber
- Melvin Williams - former Baltimore drug trafficker and actor
- Stanley "Tookie" Williams - Former leader of the Crips

== Cast ==
- Alex A. Alonso ... Himself (2 episodes, 2006, 2008)
- Chico Brown ... Himself (1 episode, 2006)
- Antoine Clark ... Himself (1 episode, 2006)
- Bernard Parks ... Himself (1 episode, 2006)
- Charles Pitchford ... Himself (1 episode, 2006)
- Fred Shaw Jr. ... Himself (1 episode, 2006)
- Maxine Waters ... Herself (1 episode, 2006)
- John W. King ... Himself (1 episode, 2007)
- Sean Lorenzo ... Himself (1 episode 2006)

== Bibliography ==
- Kurtz, Alan (2012). BET American Gangster: Big Ratings by Any Means Necessary (Kindle ed.). Independent reviews of all three seasons (26 episodes).
