= Wallace Rice (gangster) =

American mobster

Wallace Rice (born circa 1933) is a gangster who was part of the 1970s heroin trade in Harlem, New York. Rice was one of the seven members of The Council that included Leroy "Nicky" Barnes, known as "Mr Untouchable", its leader.

== The Council ==
The Council comprised seven people: Leroy "Nicky" Barnes, Joseph "Jazz" Hayden, Wallace Rice, Thomas "Gaps" Foreman, Ishmael Muhammed, Frank James, and Guy Fisher

== Downfall ==
Wallace Rice was arrested by police officers Dunphy and Orenburgher of the NYCP City Wide Anti Crime Squad when they found over 2 kilos of heroin in his car. He was prosecuted and convicted by Assistant District Attorney Keith Krasnove and sentenced to a life sentence on January 12, 1984. It is alleged that Nicky Barnes tipped off the police that Rice was transporting heroin.

Wallace Rice was arrested and charged with crimes as a result of testimony from Barnes. According to Leroy Barnes, while in prison he discovered that his assets were not being taken care of, The Council stopped paying his attorneys' fees, and one of his fellow council members, Guy Fisher, was having an affair with his mistress/girlfriend. The Council had a rule that no council member would sleep with another council member's wife. In response, Barnes became an informant. He forwarded a list of 109 names, five of whom were council members, along with his wife's name, implicating them all in illegal activities related to the heroin trade. Barnes helped to indict 44 other traffickers, 16 of whom were ultimately convicted. In this testimony, he implicated himself in eight murders.
