= Major Coxson =

American drug kingpin (1930–1973)

- Born: Major Benjamin Coxson; June 20, 1930; Fairbank, Pennsylvania, U.S.
- Died: June 8, 1973 (aged 42); Cherry Hill, New Jersey, U.S.
- Burial place: Mount Lawn Cemetery, Darby, Pennsylvania, U.S.

Major Benjamin Coxson (June 20, 1930 – June 8, 1973), also known as The Maj, was an American gangster from Philadelphia, Pennsylvania. Coxson was a flamboyant entrepreneur and civil rights activist who co-owned a Philadelphia nightclub with activist Stanley Branche, was close friends and neighbor to Muhammad Ali, and ran unsuccessfully for mayor of Camden, New Jersey, in 1972. Coxson was a powerful drug dealer and power broker in Philadelphia who served as an intermediary between African-American and Italian-American organized crime groups.

Coxson was murdered at his home in Cherry Hill, New Jersey, in 1973 which the police theorized that the Philadelphia Black Mafia killed him for his failure to broker a heroin deal with the New York Mafia.

== Early life and education ==
Major Benjamin Coxson was born in 1929 in Fairbank, Pennsylvania, to Israel and Maybell Coxson. He attended Benjamin Franklin High School in Philadelphia. As a teenager he worked at shoeshine stands and car washes, investing the money in used car lots, car dealerships and other enterprises. Coxson was drafted into the military in 1946.

== Career ==
Coxson co-owned a nightclub named the Rolls Royce Lounge in Center City Philadelphia with civil rights activist Stanley Branche. While running the nightclub, Coxson was deeply involved in organized crime and operated as a drug kingpin. Coxson was arrested 17 times and convicted 10 times on fraud and larceny charges. He served 22 months in a federal prison in Lewisburg, Pennsylvania, for his involvement in an interstate car theft ring. Coxson was involved in the establishment of dummy corporations for money laundering, credit card fraud and extortion. Companies such as Crescent Furniture Company, Pyramid Enterprises, Barry Goldstein Agency and Fairmount Foods drew checks that were made payable to Elijah Muhammad's Mosque No. 12 in Philadelphia.

Coxson was a close friend and neighbor of Muhammad Ali when he lived in Cherry Hill, New Jersey. They met in 1968 when Ali spoke at a fundraiser for a neighborhood organization called the Black Coalition of which Coxson was a board member. In 1970, after Muhammad Ali defeated Jerry Quarry in the ring, he grabbed the microphone from Howard Cosell and declared: "Good luck to my friend back there in Cherry Hill, Major Coxson, who is the next mayor of Camden, New Jersey." In 1972, Coxson ran for mayor of Camden, but lost to Angelo Errichetti. When questioned during the campaign about his criminal record, Coxson replied:

"Most politicians start out as officeholders and wind up getting arrested. I aim to reverse that process."

— Major Coxson

Coxson was an associate of Angelo Bruno, the boss of the Philadelphia crime family, and acted as a broker between African-American and Italian-American crime syndicates in Philadelphia. Coxson was the Black Mafia's narcotic connection, he received high grade heroin from the notorious East Coast drug trafficker Frank Matthews.

== Murder ==
On June 8, 1973, Coxson was murdered in his home at 1146A Barbara Drive in Cherry Hill. Coxson, along with his companion, her daughter, and her oldest son, were bound and shot. Her younger son also was bound but was able to escape and alert a neighbor. One of the victims told police that four black men in a Cadillac arrived at the house at 4:00 AM. He stated that they honked the car horn and were let into the house by Coxson; therefore, he assumed they were friends. The five men spoke for a while before the violence began.

It was theorized that the Black Mafia ordered Coxson killed for failing to broker a major heroin deal between the Five Families from New York City and the Philadelphia Black Mafia.

The two lead suspects in the murders were Black Mafia members Ronald Harvey and Samuel Christian. Harvey was a Philadelphia crime figure that was the 320th person placed on the FBI Ten Most Wanted Fugitives list for his suspected involvement in the Coxson murder. He was arrested and indicted on 11 counts regarding the Coxson murder with bail set at $3 million. He was eventually convicted of the 1973 Hanafi Muslim massacre of two men and five children in Washington D.C. in January 1973. Harvey was never charged with the Coxson murder and died in prison. Christian was the 321st person placed on the FBI Ten Most Wanted Fugitives list for his suspected involvement with the Coxson murder. Christian was not convicted of the Coxson murder since no witnesses were willing to come forward.

Coxson was interred at Mount Lawn Cemetery in Darby, Pennsylvania.

== See also ==
- List of unsolved murders (1900–1979)
