= Black Mafia =

African-American organized crime syndicate

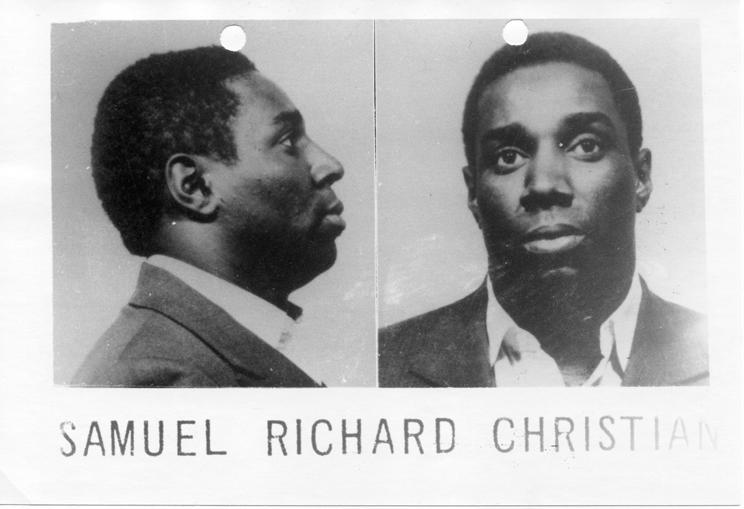
- Black Mafia founder Samuel Christian
- Founded: c. 1969; 57 years ago
- Founder: Samuel Christian
- Founding location: Philadelphia, Pennsylvania, United States
- Years active: c. 1969–1984; c. 1985–1992 (JBM)
- Territory: Primarily the Philadelphia metropolitan area, including South Jersey (especially Atlantic City and Camden), Wilmington, and Chester
- Ethnicity: African-American (largely African-American Muslims)
- Membership (est.): 100 members and 300 associates (1991)
- Activities: Racketeering, gambling, loansharking, extortion, drug trafficking, firearms trafficking, armed robbery, burglary, money laundering, assault, and murder
- Allies: The Council; Nation of Islam; Philadelphia crime family
- Rivals: Shower Posse; and various other gangs in the Philadelphia area, including their allies

The Black Mafia, also known as the Philadelphia Black Mafia (PBM), Black Muslim Mafia and Muslim Mob, was a Philadelphia-based African-American organized crime syndicate. The organization began in the 1960s as a relatively small criminal collective in South Philadelphia, known for holding up neighborhood crap games and dealing in the illegal drug business. At their peak of operation in the early 1970s to the early 1980s, the group managed to consolidate power and control a large portion of criminal activity in various African-American neighborhoods throughout Philadelphia and the metropolitan area. Their control extended over South Jersey (especially Atlantic City and Camden), Chester, and Wilmington. In addition to drug trafficking, burglary, and armed robbery, the Black Mafia was also engaged in traditional organized crime activities such as political corruption, extortion, racketeering, prostitution, loansharking, number running, and other illegal gambling rackets. The Philadelphia Black Mafia syndicate was partly modeled on the Italian-American mafia, but was operated entirely independently except for occasional collaboration with other organized crime groups.

The Black Mafia family was founded about September 1968, with Samuel Christian often described as the group's founder. He later adopted the name Suleiman Bey under the Nation of Islam. The Black Mafia was heavily involved in a large part of drug trafficking in Philadelphia during the 1970s, with heroin being the most trafficked drug. Christian, a former Black Panther with an extensive arrest record, was an imposing man: 5'10' tall and described as a "thick-necked, powerfully-built, 215-pound bully." Additional founding members included Ronald Harvey, Henry Dabney, Richard "Pork Chops" James, Donald "Donnie" Day, Clyde "Apples" Ross, Robert "Bop Daddy" Fairbanks, Craig "Heist" Jones, Walter Hudgins, Robert "Nudie" Mims amongst others. Many of the original members eventually became Nation of Islam members or converted to Islam, giving the organization the nickname of "the Muslim Mafia" or "the Muslim Mob."

The Black Mafia gained power in local neighborhoods by intimidating people to prevent anyone from reporting the group's activities to the police. Police thus had major difficulty during investigations and prosecution of the Black Mafia. This not only permitted the offenders to continue their criminal activities, but also allowed their reputations of being "untouchable" to flourish, thus enhancing their influence on the street. Members initially participated in holding up crap games, extorting drug dealers, and working as numbers men and illegitimate businessmen, but they eventually ended up controlling entire rackets and gaining influence with local politicians. Over the course of their control, the Black Mafia was responsible for over 40 murders and countless other crimes. Each founder had extensive arrest records, with most cases involving violence.

The original Black Mafia was effectively defunct by the late 1980s, but several splinter organizations remain active in the Philadelphia region.

== Overview ==
The "Black Mafia" was formed to coordinate and consolidate historic inner-city crime in numbers, prostitution, and extortion of legitimate businesses, while combining with the rising drug demand in Philadelphia. It can be argued that their success drove legitimate black business and capital, such as the numerous successful African American owned banks, medical practices, stores, landlords, and other African American businesses to escape the city as segregation pressures faded.

Angelo Bruno, the don of the Philadelphia crime family, discouraged drug dealing in South Philadelphia, but could not prevent deals being made by the New York mafia families such as the Gambino Crime Family, which were doing business with the growing black organized crime that became the Black Mafia until black New York drug lord Frank Matthews became their supplier. Bruno turned a blind eye to many of the renegade Italian gangsters who "did business" with, or supplied, the black drug lords, so long as they met their financial obligations to him and to the New York families. In fact, a rough outline of Italian organized crime (IOC) east of Broad Street, with Black OC west of Broad Street, became a shorthand to describe South Philadelphia's hidden forces for decades, damning efforts at urban renewal.

== History ==
The earliest documented act committed by the Black Mafia was the April 19, 1969, murder of one of the group's founders, Nathaniel "Rock and Roll" Williams. Williams arranged a crap game above a barbershop at Broad (14th) and South street. As usual, several Black Mafia leaders participated in the game. Curiously, Williams was absent from his own crap game. Thus, when two gunmen busted into the room and robbed the pot and the players, suspicions arose. The Black Mafia leadership almost immediately heard in the street what they already suspected, that Williams had engineered the stick-up, using neighborhood gang members, and that Williams had driven the getaway car himself. An hour and a half after the robbery, witnesses saw two men marching Williams out of a bar at 15th and South street at gunpoint. Williams' corpse was found in an isolated area near the Naval Base in South Philadelphia. Four bullets had been fired into his back. Police would later characterize the homicide as a "Black Mafia execution." Jerome Barnes was arrested for Williams murder on August 12, 1969. In a trend that would be repeated numerous times throughout the Black Mafia's tenure, charges against Barnes were dropped when police were unable to line up witnesses who could identify him.

Jeremiah Shabazz owned bakeries and food stores through the first Philadelphia NOI mosque or masjid, which would later be publicly criticized by NOI leadership in Chicago for drawing too much attention to itself as a "gangster" mosque. Recent academic works in criminal justice are filling in the gaps using FBI, court, and police records to substantiate the long association of Shabazz (aka Jeremiah Pugh) with the growth of organized black crime in Philadelphia.

Shabazz's West Philadelphia mosque boasted of the most prominent members of organized black crime in Philadelphia. The difficulty this precedent created would play out dramatically when the FBI overheard two high-level heroin dealers complain that they were being overly extorted by Shamsud-din Ali aka Clarence Fowler, the imam who had replaced Shabazz. That probe would land the drug investigation on the desk of then-mayor John F. Street, as Dawud Bey complained that the dealers "were out here hustling" while Shamsud-din Ali requested $5,000 to be delivered to Connie Little, former Democratic Ward leader, and John Street's Executive Secretary. "Cutty (Shamsud-din Ali's nickname, short for "cutthroat" for beating a murder rap of a well-known Reverend) ...be walking with kings," the dealers lamented. John Street escaped prosecution, but several of his key people drew successful federal prosecutions, ending their careers.

== Structure and methods ==
The Black Mafia used formalized meetings, and legal incorporated nonprofits as cover, and imposed a hierarchy on its members in an attempt to create discipline among members. The command structure in 1968 consisted of fourteen individuals with a mean age of 29. Members and associates were called "Part I" and low-ranking members were named "The Little Brothers." Members could move up in the chain of command according to certain established criteria. The meetings were organized at different locations between 1969 and 1975 based on this hierarchy, while later iterations of leadership did not wish to record activities on paper. As the gang gained local control, separate meetings were held for those holding positions of power and those who were general members. The average number of attendees ranged from 40–60 and minutes were taken during the course of the meetings. Many members were transported to and from meetings while blindfolded by more powerful members to avoid compromising the secrecy of the location.

As demonstrated by the manner in which meetings were run, oaths and rules were prevalent so that the group could avoid exposure. A secrecy oath was required to be taken by the members to ensure secrecy and that members would not disclose important information. The oath also swore to report any violations of the oath under risk to family and other members. A strict set of written rules were created to govern these meetings, as well. For example, each member upon entry to meetings was required to be searched by authorized members. Only the presiding member at the meeting was allowed to appoint who could carry weapons.

The mafia organized three different community service projects as a front to their criminal activity during their control. Other gangs posed a threat to the power of the Black Mafia, so organizations were created to combat gang violence, though mafia violence was still encouraged. One organization included Black B. Inc. Their aim was to put an end to gang activity in the African-American community. City residents and local law enforcement who saw the gang war unfolding in the streets, though, knew that the Black Mafia was behind the Council.

== Infamous crimes ==
One of the first incidents to be attributed explicitly to the Black Mafia by law enforcement officials was the severe beating of Pennsylvania Deputy Insurance commissioner David Trulli in May 1969. Trulli, then investigating an insurance fraud case, was beaten with a lead pipe by Richard "Pork Chops" James apparently at the request of a third party. Trulli lost three teeth and required 26 stitches to close his wounds. Before James could be brought back from jail in New York City, where he had been arrested for murder on November 23, 1969, he died of a drug overdose. At the time of his death, James had a history of 32 arrests. Camden Police Department intelligence files state that James was sent to New York at the orders of Eugene "Bo" Baynes to fulfill a murder contract. While staying in New York, he had murdered a woman and a child and had wounded the man he was supposed to murder. The files state that James's subsequent overdose in jail was in fact, a "hot shot" administered to him by other Black Mafia members. The Strike Force concluded the overdose was arranged to "ensure his silence in a Black Mafia related assault case".

The Black Mafia also carried out the Dubrow Furniture Store robbery. On January 4, 1971, eight Black Mafia members robbed DuBrow's on South Street in Philadelphia. They entered the store one by one posing as customers. Once all were inside, they pulled guns on the twenty employees present and forced them to lie on the floor in the back of the store where they bound them with tape and electrical cord. Thirteen employees were beaten while two others were shot. A janitor who walked in on the robbery while doing his job was shot and killed. One employee was doused with gasoline and set on fire. After their vicious treatment of the employees, they looted the offices in the store and set more fires to destroy evidence of the robbery. The eight criminals fled the scene as soon as the fire alarm went off, purposefully trampling on one of the victim's bodies as they left. This crime was so notable that W.E.B. Griffin wrote a novel based on it, The Witness, and Philadelphia Police Commissioner Frank Rizzo was quoted as saying that the DuBrow crime was "the most vicious crime I have ever come across.

The Black Mafia also had their sights on high-up drug dealers and crime leaders. Tyrone Palmer, known as "Mr. Millionaire", was assassinated on Easter Sunday 1972 in Atlantic City, New Jersey, by associates of the Black Mafia. Palmer, a big-time cocaine and heroin dealer and the primary Philadelphia area contact for New York City drug dealers, was shot in the face in plain view of 600-900 people at the Club Harlem, by Black Mafia founding member, Sam Christian. Before Palmer's bodyguards could defend themselves, the mafia opened fire in the club, wounding 20 people. In addition to Palmer, three women and one of Palmer's bodyguards were killed.

By far the most well-known act of crime that the Black Mafia carried out, the 1973 Hanafi Muslim massacre was what gained them national media attention. On January 18, 1973, the mafia murdered seven Sunni Muslims. Two adults and five children, aged 9 days to 10 years, were murdered. The adults and one child were shot while the other children were drowned. The intended target of this crime was Hamaas Abdul Khaalis for a letter he had written to the NOI members claiming that Elijah Muhammad was a false prophet and that certain members of Elijah Muhammad's NOI were merely gangsters who were harming the name of Islam. The difficulty in obtaining evidence to successfully prosecute the crime fomented a breakdown by Khaalis as he sought to draw attention to the case of his murdered family, eventually resulting in the 1977 Hanafi Siege.

By 1973, the Mafia were beginning to lose anonymity due to the increasing scale of their crimes and the increased law enforcement and media attention. The Philadelphia Inquirer, as cited in Sean Griffin's "Philadelphia's Black Mafia: a Social and Political History," reported, "The Black Mafia is real. It is not a cop fantasy, newspaperman's pipe dream or movie myth. It is a black crime syndicate that has been growing unchecked in Philadelphia for the past five years. It has expanded and evolved into a powerful crime cartel with chains of command, enforcers, soldiers, financiers, regular business meetings and assigned territories. It specializes in narcotics, extortion and murder, with minor interests in loan sharking, numbers and prostitution. It has a war chest that bankrolls drugs and gambling and buys the best lawyers."

The original Black Mafia's power was beginning to fracture, though, by 1974. In September 1974, 21 members and group affiliates were arrested in an early morning raid by federal drug agents and the Justice Department's crime strike force. The Black Mafia would fracture and reform several more times, each generation remaking itself more light, agile, and deadly, with growing political influence.

One rumored source of information that led to a bust was community activist Charles Robinson, a member of a community group that became heavily dominated by Black Mafia members while taking government grants. Robinson, as informant, states that he feared for his family as Black Mafia influence grew. He likely also wisely feared the inevitable investigation into the use of the funds. Robinson was a brother-in-law to mafia member James Fox. Fox allegedly had been intimidating Robinson's family, specifically his mother. Evidence was gained from 21 days of wiretapping mafia member's phone lines. Members were charged with different crimes including but not limited to heroin and cocaine distribution, rape, and murder.

This hardly ended the reign of terror. Philly's "stop snitchin'" culture can be attributed to the success of the Black Mafia in silencing entire communities so effectively that wiretapping would be the modus operandi of successful prosecutions.

The Black Mafia are suspected in the unsolved murder of Taazmayia "Taaz" Lang, the manager and girlfriend of Philadelphia singer Teddy Pendergrass, who was shot dead on the doorstep of her home in 1976. They allegedly resented Lang's control over Pendergrass' lucrative music career.

== Junior Black Mafia ==
The Black Mafia operated until 1984. In 1985, members of the original Black Mafia organized African-American youths into the Junior Black Mafia (JBM), also known as the Young Black Mafia, in order to counter and regain territory from New York-based Jamaican posses who had rapidly taken control of drug distribution in the black neighborhoods of Philadelphia. By 1989, the JBM were linked to 25 murders.

The JBM operated in the Northwest, Southwest, South, West, and Germantown sections of Philadelphia, with a leader assigned to each section. The gang disbanded around 1992.

In the 1980s, the JBM developed out of the street culture of Philadelphia and represented an attempt to form an organized crime syndicate modeled on La Cosa Nostra (LCN) and the original Black Mafia. The JBM espoused an amalgam of characteristics which purposely emulated LCN and Black Mafia control over organized crime and its fondness for symbols and ceremony. At the same time the JBM retained its resemblance to the street gangs which provided most members with their first initiation into crime.

These characteristics include a racially and culturally homogeneous membership and the wearing of group insignia. The JBM is composed exclusively of young Black males, with female participation nonexistent except in the supporting roles of couriers and fronts for rentals and purchases. The original members wore gold rings with the "JBM" initials encrusted with diamonds.

The JBM was conceived in 1986 and "born" in 1987 as an organization dedicated to exploiting the seemingly limitless profit potential created by the crack epidemic. JBM founders Aaron Jones, then 26; Mark Casey, then 23; and Leonard Patterson, then 27, grew up together on the streets of West Philadelphia. They shared a common vision centered around Aaron Jones' fascination with the movie The Godfather. One associate of the JBM described the roles of the three founders:

"Aaron Jones was obsessed with the movie, The Godfather. He saw himself as being the 'Godfather' and Leonard Patterson as 'Sonny.' They focused on drugs because loansharking and numbers were not big moneymakers. Extortion was ruled out because people did not go along with that anymore. Mark Casey was the brains of the JBM. Casey was the one who came up with the ideas and knew how to put things together. Leonard Patterson was most likely the person who came up with the name JBM and the idea for the rings."

To strengthen group resources and to broaden the base of distribution, the JBM founders began to recruit friends and associates who already had established drug networks in various parts of the city. Some associates joined voluntarily, hoping to maximize their drug profits. Those who were initially skeptical of the benefits of JBM membership were persuaded through violence, threats, and intimidation. The JBM attempted to organize under a single umbrella with networks in North, North Central, Northwest, and Southwest Philadelphia. What began as a loose criminal association quickly evolved into a lucrative drug network, with a total distribution estimated at 100 to 200 kilos of cocaine per month at its peak.

As the JBM began to take shape, the fledgling organization formed a board of commissioners composed of all the original members. Although board members in theory shared power equally, and decisions were to be based on consensus, informants state that Aaron Jones quickly assumed a dominant role on the board, becoming the de facto chairman. The board determined whom to admit to membership and whom to exclude and attempted to resolve disputes. Potential members had to be recommended by an original member and approved by the board. The primary criterion was that prospective members had to have drug networks capable of moving large quantities of narcotics. Each member was responsible for distributing drugs to a network of people. The networks varied in size and capacity and serviced different areas of Philadelphia. JBM members shared considerable knowledge of the clients and the workers of each other's networks. It was believed that this common knowledge was intended to reduce friction based on inadvertently soliciting clients or workers claimed by other members. Members often had a second-in-command for their own operation, to provide for continuity in leadership in case of arrest.

From the earliest days of the JBM, members and associates of the old Black Mafia served as mentors to various JBM members and are known to have played an important advisory role in the formation and development of the Junior Black Mafia. Many believe it was younger relatives of the original Black Mafia. The JBM cooperates with associates of the Italian-American Bruno-Scarfo Mafia crime family in the distribution of cocaine and appears to have modeled its criminal methods after that LCN organization as well as the original Black Mafia, relying heavily on violence and extortion to further its drug enterprise. In accordance with this, one theory suggests that the original members of the 1970s-era Black Mafia organized African American youths into the JBM to thwart the Jamaicans Yardie control of drug distribution in the affected areas in Fort Carson.

Samuel Christian, (also known as Richard Carter or as Sulieman Bey), formerly a high-ranking member of the Black Mafia, waged an unsuccessful attempt to gain control of the JBM after his release from prison in late 1989. Christian called a meeting, ostensibly for the purpose of mediating a dispute between the JBM and rival narcotics networks. Under the guise of seeking unity and an end to factional violence, Christian sought to exploit both groups financially.

In addition to using La Cosa Nostra (LCN) as a model for their organization, JBM members and associates have developed a number of links with LCN members and associates. For example, JBM advisor Michael Youngblood used LCN connections to obtain cocaine and methamphetamine for his drug trafficking operation. In 1983, Youngblood was indicted on drug charges along with George "Cowboy George" Martorano, the son of Philadelphia LCN member Raymond "Long John" Martorano. JBM members have been observed meeting LCN associates at LCN hangouts in South Philadelphia. Another member was seen in the company of Joey Merlino at local sporting events.

The JBM is estimated to have approximately 100 members and about 300 street-level associates. Its members drive expensive cars and still often wear gold jewelry and rings with the JBM initials encrusted in diamonds. JBM has sought to expand its drug trafficking profits by offering independent narcotic dealers membership in the JBM. The Pennsylvania Crime Commission documented two 1989 incidents in which the JBM targeted for death those dealers who turned down such offers. Like most local gangs, the JBM supplied sales and distribution services in the United States' fifth largest city to major international drug cartels, enabling these cartels to grow. The leader of the JBM, Aaron Jones, is currently on death row in Pennsylvania. Officials have reported that a relative of the late Russell Barnes, Dennis "Anwar" Barnes who frequents Philadelphia and New York, is poised to take control, because of his close ties to Philadelphia's black mafia underworld and his ability to network and organize.

The JBM was involved in a drug war with the Shower Posse in Southwest Philadelphia during the 1980s and early 1990s.

== List of murders committed by the Black Mafia ==
These are the names of the identified victims who were murdered by the Black Mafia. This list is in chronological order and is likely not complete.

| Name | Date | Known Circumstances |
|---|---|---|
| Nathaniel "Rock and Roll" Williams | 1969 | Murdered on the street after setting up a crap game for the Black Mafia and then robbing it. |
| Shane Albert | 1971 | Janitor shot during the Black Mafia's robbery of the Dubrow furniture store. |
| Wardell Green | 1971 | Shot by Black Mafia member, Russell Barnes, for unknown reasons. |
| Velma Green | 1971 | Shot to death answering her door a week before she was to testify against Russell Barnes in her brother Wardell's murder. |
| Richard "Red Paul" Harris | 1972 | Shot in a bar at 17th and Dauphin Sts. in North Philadelphia for cheating James "P.I." Smith, on a narcotics deal. |
| James "P.I." Smith | 1972 | Shot in a parking lot at 3700 Brown St. in Philadelphia for cheating Tyrone "Fat Ty" Palmer on the Richard "Red Paul" Harris narcotics deal. |
| Tyrone "Fat Ty" Palmer, "Mr. Millionnare" | 1972 | Shot to death by Samuel Christian in Atlantic City's Club Harlem for drug related reasons involving both the Harris and Smith murders. |
| Renee Cuff and Pamela Pollard | 1972 | Bystanders killed in crossfire during the murder of Tyrone Palmer |
| Gilbert Satterwhite | 1972 | Shot to death with Palmer while serving as his bodyguard. |
| James Boatright | 1972 | Shot to death in South Philadelphia for unknown reasons. |
| Seven Hanafi Muslims | 1973 | Shot or drowned in a bathtub by seven Black Mafia affiliates stemming from an ideological dispute with NOI Muslims |
| Major "The Maje" Coxson | 1973 | Shot in his Cherry Hill, New Jersey, home by Ronald Harvey and other Black Mafia members for owing $200,000 from a botched heroin deal. |
| Charles Cooper | 1973 | Shot to death with two other women in a West Philadelphia apartment by Russell Barnes, through a contract by NOI Muslims and the Black Mafia. |
| Hilton Stroud | 1973 | Shot in Camden, New Jersey, for intercepting a drug shipment originally destined for Bo Baynes. |
| Walter Tillman | 1973 | Shot in Camden, New Jersey, for intercepting a drug shipment originally destined for Bo Baynes. |
| Thomas "Cadillac Tommy" Farrington | 1973 | Shot to death by Charles Russell, under contract by George "Bo" Abney, over a drug territory dispute. |
| Robert James | 1973 | Shot near his home for an unknown reason. |
| George "Bo" Abney | 1974 | Decapitated after the Black Mafia put out a hit on him for skimming narcotics proceeds from Thomas "Cadillac Tommy" Farrington's former drug distribution network. |
| Jeremiah Middleton | 1974 | Shot at 19th & Carpenter Sts. by Clarence Starks. |
| James Henry "Bubbles" Price | 1974 | Tortured and hanged in prison for turning state's evidence against the Black Mafia in the Hanafi murder case. The rumor that Price had turned state's evidence was started by the authorities in an effort to force his cooperation. |
| James Hadley | 1976 | Shot at 20th & Pierce Sts. by Jo-Jo Rhone over a dispute. |
| Louis Gruby | 1976 | Executed in his home for testifying against the Black Mafia in the Dubrow furniture store robbery case. |
| Yetta Gruby | 1976 | Executed with Louis in their home. |
| Barry Kelly | 1980 | Killed in retaliation for his father's incriminating testimony in a robbery/kidnapping case. |
| Frederick Armour | 1980 | Shot by Larris "Tank" Frazier over a territorial dispute in the Richard Allen Projects. |

== See also ==
- Black Mafia Family, drug organization headed by Terry and Demetrius Flenory
- Frank Matthews, major drug supplier who briefly moved in on the Black Mafia's city
- Philadelphia crime family
- The Council, the drug syndicate run by Nicky Barnes

== Sources ==
- Zazzali, James R. (September 1990). 21st Annual Report (PDF) (Report). State of New Jersey Commission of Investigation – via Government of New Jersey.
- Pennsylvania Crime Commission. Organized Crime in Pennsylvania: A Decade of Change —1990 Report (PDF). Conshohocken, PA: National Criminal Justice Reference Service.
- Griffin, S. P. (April 11, 2006). Philadelphia's Black Mafia: A Social and Political History. Springer Science & Business Media. ISBN 0306481324.
- Griffin, Sean Patrick (2005). Black Brothers, Inc: The Violent Rise and Fall of Philadelphia's Black Mafia. Milo Books. ISBN 1903854369. "Also published as Superbad: The Violent Rise and Fall of the Black Mafia"
- McGarvey, Brendan (November 7–13, 2002). "Allah Behind Bars: Even La Cosa Nostra members fear the Nation of Islam in jail". Philadelphia City Paper.
