= Eddie Barnz =

- Also known as: The mayor of Pittsburgh
- Born: Edward Lee Magwood; February 26, 1985 (age 41); Pittsburgh, Pennsylvania, United States
- Origin: Pittsburgh, Pennsylvania
- Genres: Rap, Hip hop, Trap
- Occupations: Rapper, producer, designer, author, Co-owner of Back to the Foodture restaurant, Owner of IBID gaming, Tv production company, Owner of Foreign clothing
- Instruments: Microphone, Maschine
- Years active: 2007–present
- Label: Hood Democrat Entertainment
- Spouse: Angel B. Magwood
- Website: www.eddiebarnzishiphop.com

Edward Lee Magwood (born February 26, 1985), best known by his stage name Eddie Barnz, is an American rapper from Pittsburgh, Pennsylvania. He is also a noted cartoon maker, known for creating the YouTube series "Elmo Faces Poverty". He released his first commercial single "Welcome 2 Pistolvania" featuring Ab Liva from Philadelphia rap group Major Figgaz and Clipse group Re Up Gang in 2007. His Dougie Fresh sampled single, "Uh Uh On" received local and national play.

In 2015, Eddie Barnz signed a distribution deal with RBC Records/Entertainment One Music to release his third commercial single "Get Rich".

== Early life ==
Barnz was born Edward Lee Magwood on February 26, 1985, in Pittsburgh, Pennsylvania, the son of Virginia Magwood, a home health aid, and Leroy Lee, an janitor. Barnz was raised in the hill district (Chauncey drive) part of Pittsburgh. Barnz attended Prospect Middle School and Brashear High School. Barnz stage name came from friend Meekal after watching documentary on New York City drug kingpin Nicky Barnes. Barnz was taught to play musical equipment like beat machines and keyboards by his father Leroy.

== Career ==
Barnz first started rapping at the mere age of eight after hearing his brother Darnell playing old rap legends like Epmd, Rakim, N.W.A and Big Daddy Kane. Before that he wanted to be a game designer.

Barnz released his first mix tape in 2007 titled "The Street Bible" featuring Ab Liva, Choppa City Boyz, B.E.T Comicview Denny Live, Lox, producers Vinny Idol and Poobs on Dat Piff .com.

Later on in 2007, Eddie Barnz had a big feud with neighboring artist Wiz Khalifa which quickly ended in 2008.

In 2008, Eddie Barnz released his single "Melt Down Love" featuring producer and singer Stevie B, In which the song got radio airplay in Boston, New York City, California, Pittsburgh and so on. "MeltDown Love" even caught the attention of music industry people like Jadakiss, Cam'ron and The Mad Rapper. The mad Rapper actually asked Barnz to come to a studio in New York City and meet him and P Diddy. While living with his cousin one sunny afternoon Barnz was laying in the bed when he received a call from Cam'rons manager asking him to get on stage with Dipset in Ohio. After that calls were pouring in from D Block artist Jadakiss, Nature from Nas super group The Firm Later on Eddie Barnz was nominated best new artist at the first Pittsburgh hip hop awards. While at the Hip Hop awards label Warner Bros. Records. wanted to meet with Barnz but he would later decline the meeting

In 2013, Barnz became the face of local clothing brand Rebellion Clothing based out of Pittsburgh And New York City watch company Me O'clock.

In 2014, Eddie Barnz released his single "Uh Uh On" by Buck 50 which was a sample of Dougie Fresh "The Show" which gained Barnz a hundred thousand views on YouTube in minutes. "Uh Uh On" also got Barnz a call from Hip Hop Weekly's owner David Mays wife asking to be in the artist to watch write up in their magazine. In which led to Barnz being in XXL freshman magazine and also the Pittsburgh City Paper, Pittsburgh Post-Gazette, Brotha Ash Productions Magazine Brotha Ash Productions – Pittsburgh's and Western, Pennsylvania's Primary Community Web Site having a REAL CONNECTION to our Tri-State Area Communities and Beyond. The same year Barnz came out with a perfume line titled "Barnzy". Later on that year Barnz also released a club single called "My Money" which was produced by him, but the single never took off due to little marketing. 2014 ended off with a big surprise when The Pittsburgh Post-Gazette put Eddie Barnz in their 2014 biggest music stories newspaper.

In 2015, Barnz signed a distribution deal with label RBC Records/Entertainment One Music for his new single "Get Rich" which will be on his debut album "Dollar and a Dream" coming out late September 2015

In 2016, Barnz released his perfume, Papillion, and also his autobiography, Dollar & A Dream.

In 2018, Barnz created clothing company Foreign Empire.

In 2019, Barnz and Angel Randolph opened restaurant/museum Back to the Foodture.

== Discography ==
- Welcome 2 Pistolvania (2007)
- Street Bible (mixtape) (2008)
- Uh Uh On (2014)
- My Money (2014)
- Get Rich (2015)
