= Mr. Untouchable =

- Theatrical release poster
- Directed by: Marc Levin
- Produced by: Mary-Jane Robinson; Alex Gibney; Jason Kliot; Joana Vincente
- Starring: Nicky Barnes
- Cinematography: Henry Adebonojo
- Edited by: Emir Lewis; Daniel Praid
- Music by: Hi-Tek
- Distributed by: Magnolia Pictures
- Release date: October 26, 2007
- Country: United States
- Language: English

Mr. Untouchable is an English-language documentary film for HDNet Films, directed by Marc Levin, and produced by Mary-Jane Robinson. The film, which opened in limited release on October 26, 2007, like the memoir, Mr. Untouchable: My Crimes and Punishments (released in February 2007), addresses the rise and fall of Nicky Barnes, a former drug kingpin in New York City. The film includes first-hand testimony from Barnes himself and was produced by New York-based Blowback Productions.

== Cast ==
- Nicky Barnes, The Godfather of Harlem
- Thelma Grant, the former Mrs. Nicky Barnes
- Frank James, an original member of the 'Council'
- Joseph 'Jazz' Hayden, an original member of the 'Council'
- Jackie Hayden, Jazz's wife
- Leon 'Scrap' Batts, a Lieutenant in Barnes organization
- Carol Hawkins, heroin street dealer for Barnes organization
- David Breitbart, Nicky's lawyer
- Don Ferrarone, DEA Agent in charge of Nicky Barnes case
- Louie Diaz, undercover DEA agent
- Bobby Nieves, a DEA agent
- Robert Geronimo, a DEA informant
- Robert Fiske, Jr., US Attorney for Southern District of NY who prosecuted Barnes
- Tom Sear, Ass. US Attorney
- Benito Romano, Assistant US Attorney who flipped Barnes
- Fred Ferretti, reporter who wrote 1977 NY Times article, "Mr. Untouchable"
