= Hillary Weston =

American talent manager

- Occupations: Manager, Music industry executive
- Known for: Manager of Lil' Kim

Hillary Weston is the American former longtime manager and friend of American rap artist Lil' Kim.

Weston has served as associate producer on three of her albums - The Notorious K.I.M., La Bella Mafia, and The Naked Truth. She also served as executive producer for Lil' Kim's television series Countdown to Lockdown.

She served as co-manager before replacing Lil' Kim's previous manager Damion "D-Roc" Bulter, whom she severed ties with in 2001, after a shooting incident that occurred at the Hot 97 radio station offices in New York City, New York.

Weston can be seen in the television series Countdown To Lockdown as well as the Junior M.A.F.I.A. documentary Life After Death.
