= Joe Sánchez =

Police officer and whistleblower (b. 1947)

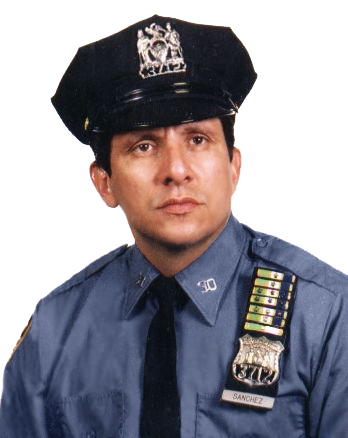
- Joe Sánchez during his time with the NYPD
- Born: January 16, 1947 (age 79); Santurce, Puerto Rico
- Relatives: Lorraine Cassandra Pfaus (wife)
- Police career
- Department: New York City Police Department
- Service years: 1973–85
- Status: Retired
- Rank: Patrolman
- Badge no.: 3712
- Awards: NYPD Commendation with bronze star NYPD Excellent Police Duty
- Military career
- Allegiance: United States of America
- Branch: United States Army
- Service years: 1965-1967
- Unit: 1st Air Cavalry Division (Mobile)
- Conflicts: Vietnam War
- Awards: Purple Heart
- Other work: Author

Joe Sánchez (born Jose Manuel Sánchez Picon (Note: In this Spanish name, the first or paternal surname is Sánchez and the second or maternal family name is Picon.) on January 16, 1947), is a former New York City police officer and author who published books about corruption within the New York City Police Department (NYPD).

Upon exposing the illegal acts committed by some high-ranking NYPD officers, Sánchez was arrested on the basis of false allegations which were highly publicized by the news media, then subsequently refuted. When his initial conviction for assault was overturned, his case exposed the existence of a code of silence among police officers known as the "Blue Wall of Silence".

== Early years ==
Sánchez is a native of Santurce, Puerto Rico, and one of five siblings born to Jose Sánchez and Clotilde Picon. In the early 1950s his parents moved to New York City in search of a better life, and settled in Manhattan. When his parents divorced, his mother remarried and moved the family to the South Bronx. There Sánchez received his primary and secondary education. Upon graduation from Theodore Roosevelt High School, he joined the United States Army.

== Military service ==
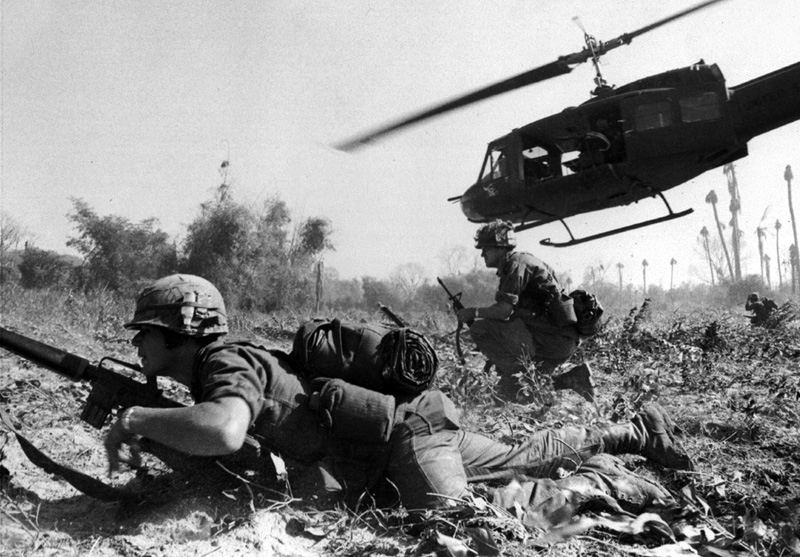
The 1st Air Cavalry Division deploying under enemy fire in Vietnam

Sánchez attempted to enlist, but for reasons unknown to him he was not accepted by any of the four military branches at the induction center at Whitehall Street. He then signed up for the selective service and in 1965, he was drafted into the United States Army at the age of 18. On January 16, 1967, on his twentieth birthday, he found himself with Company D, 2nd Battalion, 7th Cavalry of the 1st Air Cavalry Division (Mobile) (after being transferred from A Company, 5/7) deployed near the village of Phan Thiết, in South Vietnam. On that day, his unit was engaged in a firefight with the Viet Cong. Sánchez and three of his comrades were seriously wounded by the shrapnel of an enemy grenade during that firefight. He was awarded the Army Commendation Medal and Purple Heart medals.

After recovering from his wounds, Sánchez was discharged from the Army and he returned to New York City. There he met a young woman named Lorraine Cassandra Pfaus, whom he married. He worked in various jobs, among them as a taxi and ambulance driver for the New York City Health and Hospitals Corporation. On various occasions, Sánchez applied to become a police officer with the New York City Police Department, but was not accepted. He then took the entrance examination for the Port Authority of New York and New Jersey Police Department and was accepted.

Sánchez served with the Port Authority from January 1971 to October 1973, during which time he discovered that his application for the NYPD had once again been rejected because of a technicality. He opted to take his case in front of the NYPD police review board and was finally accepted as a police candidate.

== New York City Police Department ==
Sánchez graduated from the New York Police Academy after six months of training and was assigned to the 90th Precinct in Brooklyn. The 90th Precinct is located in northern Brooklyn in the Williamsburg section.

During his years as a police officer, Sánchez learned that there were good police officers as well as corrupt ones. He also noticed that illegal acts committed by some of his fellow officers were often ignored and seldom reported by others, including some of his superiors who believed in a code of silence known amongst them as the "Blue Code of Silence" and the "Blue Wall of Silence." According to this code, reporting another officer's misconduct or crimes is regarded as a betrayal.

=== "Arrest machine" nickname ===
Sánchez served in various precincts before being transferred to the 30th Precinct, a primarily residential area in Harlem with a commercial strip on Broadway. The neighborhoods in the precinct are Hamilton Heights, Sugar Hill, and West Harlem, all of which, during Sánchez's tenure, had a lot of drug use, gang activity, and turf wars.

According to the New York Daily News, Sánchez was highly dedicated to his police work at the 30th Precinct. One story has it that Sánchez once walked into a shop on 158th Street and Broadway to get some coffee. A local gentleman took one look at Sánchez, put his hands on the counter, and yelled, "Okay, Sánchez, you got me. Don't shoot!" It turned out that the man was wanted for robbery and had a gun. Sánchez was considered "an arrest machine" in northern Manhattan.

=== Blue Code of Silence ===
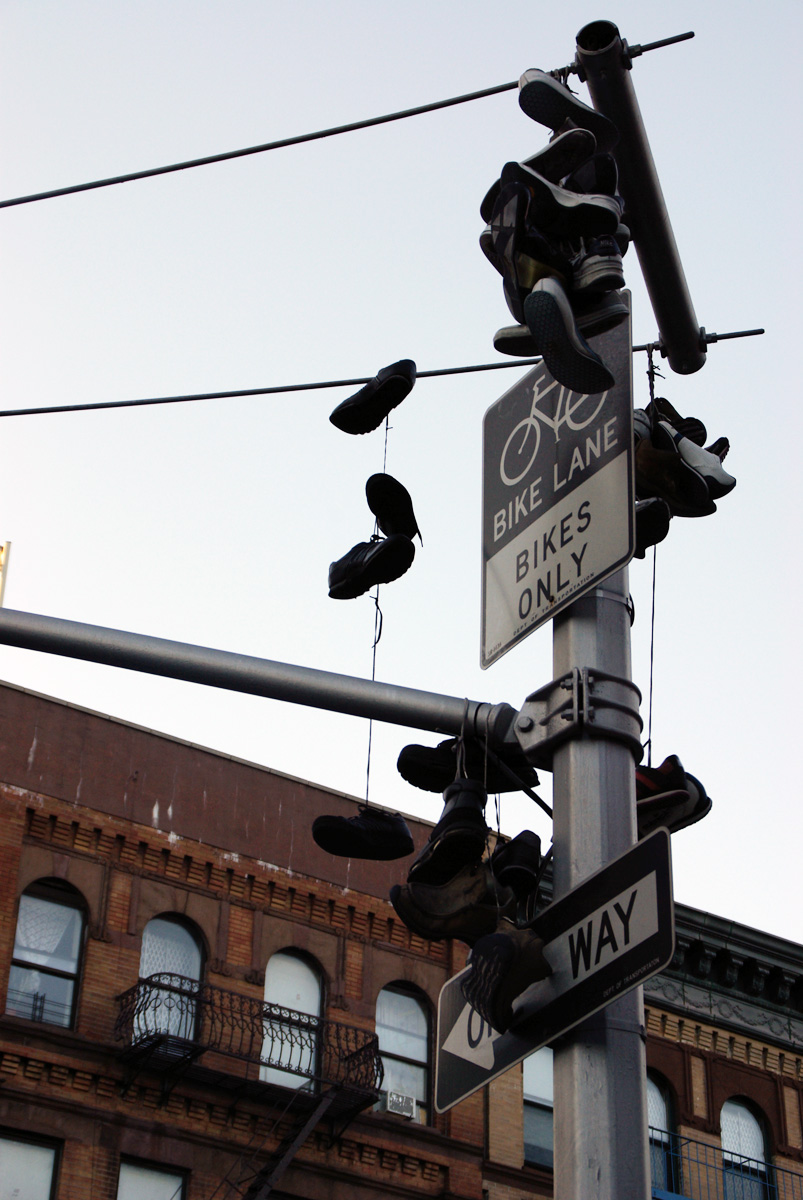
Shoes hanging from a lamppost in Sánchez's tough police beat

Sánchez accidentally discovered that one of his lieutenants was receiving payments and sexual favors in exchange for protection. After issuing a routine traffic summons to the brother of a powerful businessman, Sánchez was invited to the businessman's office and asked if he would be interested in providing protection for his drivers, "the same as your lieutenant and captain are doing." The businessman then offered him money. When Sánchez reported this situation to the NYPD Internal Affairs Division (IAD), they "wired" him with a covert recording device, with the supposed intent of gathering proof of his accusations against the lieutenant and the captain.

Unknown to Sánchez, the people who wired him were friends of his lieutenant as well. Sánchez returned to the businessman and gathered enough information to implicate this lieutenant and captain on corruption charges. However, upon learning of the situation, the lieutenant and the captain transferred Sánchez to another Court Division in the Bronx, and the IAD investigation was quietly shelved.

In 1982, Sánchez participated in a seizure of illegal drugs by the police with his partner, Herman Velez. A year later, in October, Sánchez was framed by some members of the police force with respect to the drug bust, and was indicted by a Special and Extraordinary Grand Jury in Manhattan for one count of Burglary in the First Degree, one count of Grand Larceny in the first Degree, one count of Grand Larceny in the second Degree, five counts of Grand larceny in the Third Degree, and one count of assault in the Third Degree. The witnesses against him were drug dealers he and his partner arrested in 1982, who were promised to have their indictments dropped if they agreed to testify against Sánchez. After a lengthy trial, Sánchez was exonerated of every charge, and he applied for reinstatement to his position. In 1988, due to an administrative mistake, his reinstatement appeal was sent to two different New York State Supreme Court justices. One ruled that he be rehired, and the other upheld his dismissal.

The case went before the Appellate Court of New York, which decided against Sánchez, ruling that only NYPD Police Commissioner Benjamin Ward had the statutory authority to reinstate a police officer who had been exonerated after being fired. Sánchez was not reinstated. The relevant statute has since been rescinded, and the NYPD police commissioner no longer has sole discretion to make such a decision without a departmental hearing.

== Corrections officer and retirement ==
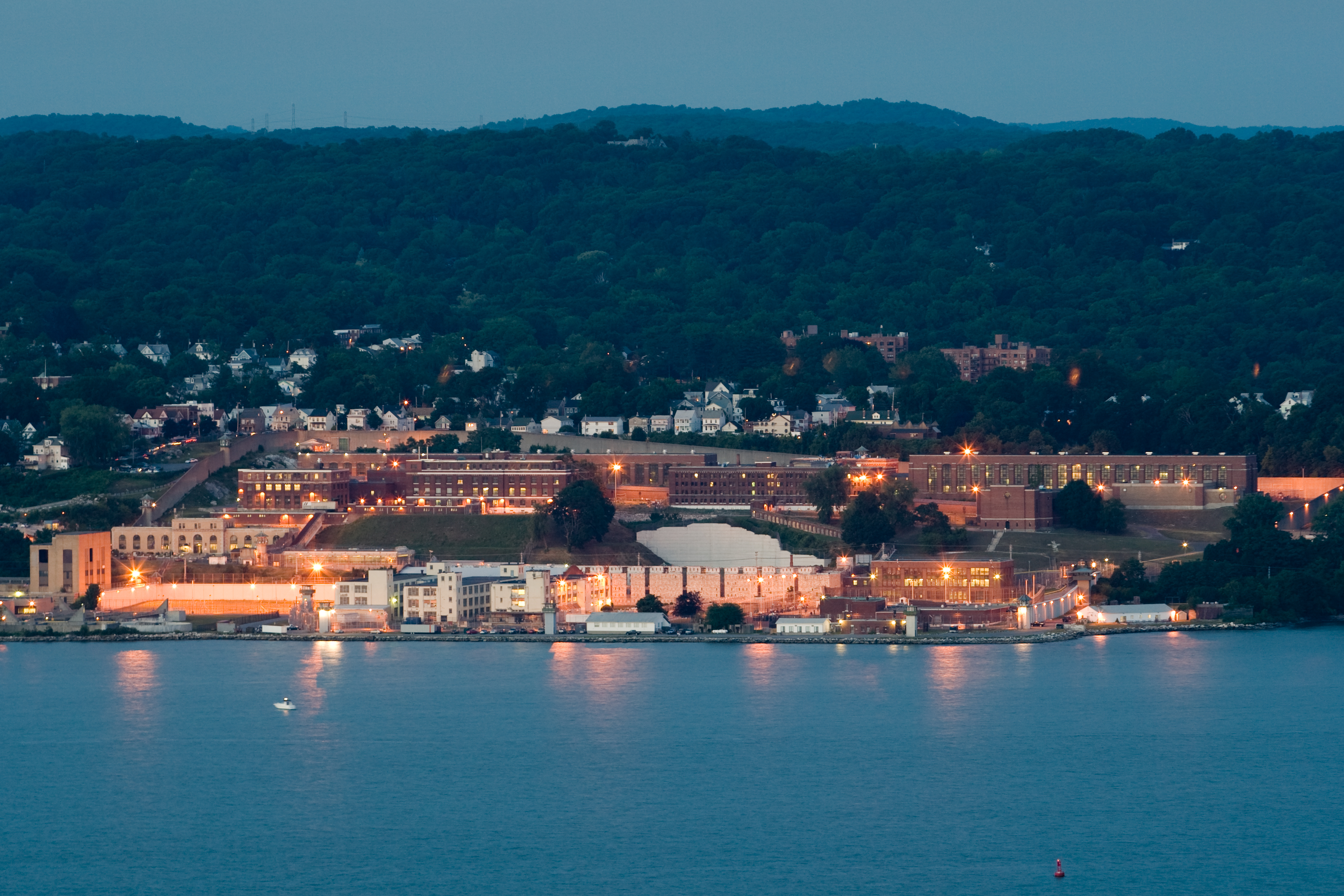
Sing Sing Correctional Facility

Sánchez worked for Holmes Security as a night supervisor for three years, then worked as a mailman in Haverstraw, New York. In 1989, he joined the New York State Department of Corrections, who welcomed him on the job.

As a corrections officer, Sánchez came into contact with many of the inmates he had arrested as a police officer in Washington Heights. He first worked at Sing Sing Correctional Facility, a maximum security prison in the village of Ossining, within the town of Ossining, New York. There, he was assaulted, and one inmate falsely accused Sánchez of mistreating him. However, the Department of Corrections supported Sánchez, and he did not receive any disciplinary action.

Sánchez then purchased a house in Catskill and transferred to Coxsackie State Prison. While at Coxsackie State Prison, he was involved in several situations involving fights between inmates. Once, he was nearly killed when he came to the aid of an inmate who was being stabbed by another, while other officers only attempted to help near the end of brawl. Sánchez considered retirement shortly afterward.

Sánchez retired and moved with his family to Florida. He continues to be active in various police-related organizations. He stated, "What I tell young cops I come in contact with...they have one of the greatest jobs in the world, and to stay honest, for once you lose a job for being dishonest, it will stay with you until you die."

== Vindication ==
External videos
- Video interviews by Suzannah B. Troy about Joe Sanchez. Parts 1, 2, 3, 4, 5, 6, 7, and 8.
- Sanchez discusses his NYPD Evaluation

In 2008, the New York Daily News wrote that his tenure at the NYPD was marked by getting double-crossed by the Internal Affairs Division, which wired him up to catch a crooked lieutenant and captain; his arrest on the allegations of a drug dealer; and a conviction for assault that was overturned; and an unsuccessful bid for reinstatement. The process of Sánchez's reinstatement review was so tainted that, in 1988, an "administrative error" sent his reinstatement appeal to two different Supreme Court justices at the same time, of which one ruled that he be rehired and the other upheld his dismissal. Sánchez documented these events in his autobiography True Blue: A Tale of The Enemy Within.

In 2013, activist and citizen journalist Suzannah B. Troy interviewed AnnaBell Washburn, one of the 12 jurors during Sánchez's 1985 trial. According to the interview, Washburn tried to help Sánchez by writing letters to the then Special State Prosecutor Charles Hynes (who went on to serve as the Brooklyn District Attorney for 24 years), Judge Dennis Edwards, who presided over Sánchez' trial, and NYPD Police Commissioner Benjamin Ward, who refused to reinstate Sanchez after he was exonerated. The stated reason for the refusal was that Sánchez was a whistleblower who broke the Police Code of Silence when he reported his lieutenant and captain for corruption.

Sánchez's experiences were the subject of a Baltimore Post-Examiner article titled "Super Cop: Badge 3712, NYPD Officer Joe Sanchez’ tragic days" published on April 27, 2016. The article was written by Doug Poppa, a United States Army Military Police veteran, former law enforcement officer, and criminal investigator.

== The Opera House ==
External videos
- Participation of Joe Sanchez in "The Opera House" documentary The Opera House

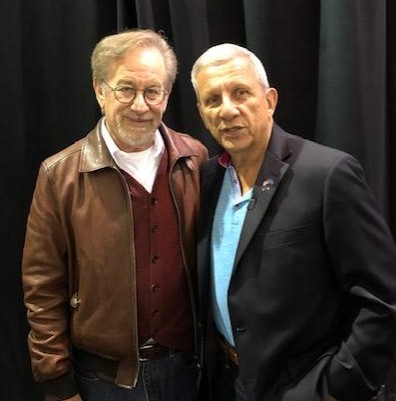
Steven Spielberg consulted Sánchez during the filming of West Side Story

Sánchez was featured in the documentary "The Opera House" by Susan Froemke, which played in selected theaters on January 13, 2018. The documentary is about the history of the Metropolitan Opera House in New York City and has nothing to do with his career in law enforcement. However, Sánchez who lived in the neighborhood where the opera house was built as a child, discusses what it was like living there and how the families who lived there were forced to move and relocate.

In 2019, the producers of Steven Spielberg's 2020 version of West Side Story included Sánchez in a special panel where the host and actors asked panel members questions about their experiences in the West Side of New York in the 1950s. The host shared the story of Sánchez's life in the West Side.

== Bibliography ==
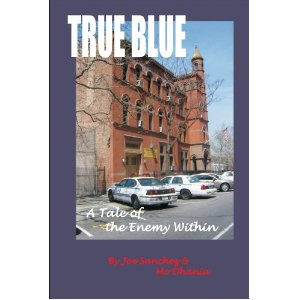

Sánchez wrote an autobiography which detailed his experiences in the NYPD, which was noted for its honesty and detail. According to the New York Daily News, Sánchez "has put it all down in an autobiography called True Blue, that is as rough around the edges as the kid who grew up in the South Bronx in the 1950s and made it to the NYPD after a tour in Vietnam and brief stint as a Port Authority cop."

Together with Mo Dhania, Sánchez is the author of the following books:

- Latin Blues, A Tale of Police Omerta From the NYPD; Publisher: The Old Kings Road Press (2006), ISBN 1-60179-000-7
- True Blue: A Tale of the Enemy Within; Publisher: Old King Road Press, ISBN 978-1-60179-012-5 (Note: "True Blue" was a MWSA (Military Writers Society of America) 2011 award nominee in the category "Non-Fiction ― Biography" and was awarded an "Honorable Mention" Medal)
- Red Herring: Police Corruption in Washington Heights; Publisher: Old King Road Press, ISBN 978-1-60179-066-8
- Yellow Streak, when one honest police officer denounces corruption... and no one has the courage to back him up; Publisher: Old King Road Press, ISBN 978-1601790774

Sánchez is also a published news editor, particularly with respect to issues of policing and public safety.

== Military decorations ==
Sánchez's military decorations are the following:

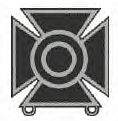

Combat Infantryman Badge
Purple Heart	Army Commendation Medal	Army Good Conduct Medal
National Defense Service Medal	Vietnam Service Medal	Vietnam Campaign Medal
Rifle Sharpshooters Badge

== In popular culture ==
- The first season episode of Law & Order called "The Blue Wall" was based partially based on Joe Sánchez's life.

== See also ==
- List of Puerto Ricans
- Puerto Rican literature
- List of Puerto Rican writers
- Benito Romano
- Louis Diaz
