= Kirk Fraser =

American film director

- Born: February 12, 1976 (age 50); Kingston, Jamaica
- Occupations: Producer, director, screenwriter
- Years active: 1998–present

Kirk Fraser (born February 12, 1976) is a film director, screenwriter, and film producer.

Kirk Fraser's first documentary film, The Life of Rayful Edmond: The Rise and Fall, Vol. I was released on July 12, 2005.

In 2006 Fraser teamed up with Lil' Kim and Tracey Edmonds to develop a reality series, Lil' Kim: Countdown to Lockdown on BET. It was the highest debuting series in BET history with 1.9 million viewers.

Fraser produced and directed Without Bias, a documentary film on Len Bias. The film was awarded the Grand Jury Prize for Best Documentary at the 13th Annual American Black Film Festival.

In 2009 ESPN selected Fraser to join the list of the top 30 film directors to develop 30 for 30, a series of documentaries in celebration of ESPN's 30Th Anniversary.

In 2020 Fraser directed and executive produced the one-hour documentary Tuskegee Airmen: Legacy of Courage for History, which will premiere on 10 February 2021.

== Selected filmography ==
- The Life of Rayful Edmond (2005) Documentary (director & executive producer)
- Lil' Kim: Countdown to Lockdown (2006) TV series (producer)
- Against All Odds (2006) Documentary (director & producer)
- American Gangster (2006–2008) TV series (producer)
- Party Boyz (2009) TV series (executive producer)
- ESPN 30 For 30: Without Bias (2009) Documentary (director & executive producer)
- Mayor For Life (2010) TV series (director & executive producer)
- Road To The Championship (2011) Documentary (director & executive producer)
- Nas: Life Is Good Tour (2012) Documentary (director & executive producer)
- Ward 8: The Past, The Present, The Future (2014) Documentary (director & producer)
- Frances Tiafoe (2016) Documentary (director & executive producer)
- From Scratch: The Birth of Hip Hop (2017) Documentary (director & producer)
- Couples' Night (2018) Movie (associate producer)
- United We Stand: The Ali Summit (2018) Documentary (directed & producer)
- Naked Hustle (2018) TV series (director & executive producer)
- Angrily Ever After (2019) Movie (producer)
- Hip Hop Holiday (2019) Movie (associate producer)
- Twas Chaos before Christmas (2019) Movie (producer)
- The Baby Proposal (2019) Movie (associate producer)
- Open (2020) Movie (associate producer)
- Basketball County: In The Water (2020) Documentary (producer)
- Naked Hustle (2020) Documentary (director & executive producer)
- Len Bias Law (2020) Documentary (director & executive producer)
- The Life of Rayful Edmond: The Rise and Fall - Special Edition (2020) Documentary (director & executive producer)
- Tuskegee Airmen: Legacy of Courage (2021) Documentary (director & executive producer)
- Boiling Point (2021) TV series (producer)

== Awards and nominations ==
Year	Award	Result	Category	Series
2006	Urban DVD Awards	Won	Best Documentary	The Life of Rayful Edmond
2009	American Black Film Festival	Won	Best Documentary	Without Bias
2010	Black Reel Awards	Won	Best Documentary	Without Bias
2010	The New York Festivals	Won	Television & Film Community Portraits	Without Bias
2010	Sports Emmy Award	Nominated	Outstanding Sports Documentary	Without Bias 30 for 30
2010	Peabody Award	Won	Outstanding Documentary	ESPN Films 30 for 30
