= Rayful Edmond =

American drug trafficker (1964–2024)

Rayful Edmond III
- Born: November 26, 1964; Washington, D.C., U.S.
- Died: December 17, 2024 (aged 60); Miami, Florida, U.S.
- Other names: Ray, Mr. Dunbar
- Status: Deceased
- Criminal charges: Original 43-count indictment charging various drug crimes, and charged with running a Continuing Criminal Enterprise involving at least 150 kilograms of cocaine and at least 1.5 kilograms of cocaine base
- Penalty: Life sentence with no parole

Details
- Date apprehended: April 15, 1989

Rayful Edmond III (November 26, 1964 – December 17, 2024) was an American drug trafficker in Washington, D.C. in the 1980s. Edmond was largely responsible for having introduced crack cocaine into the Washington, D.C. area during the crack epidemic, resulting in an escalating crime rate in the city which became known as the "murder capital of the United States". He also was a popular figure, known by many as a folk hero and role model for achieving a lavish lifestyle and giving back to the local community.

== Early life and family ==
Edmond was born in Washington, D.C. to Constance "Bootsie" Perry and Rayful Edmond II, who were government workers. Their M Street Northeast home often was filled with anywhere between 20 and 30 relatives, including Edmond's six siblings. He was exposed to the drug trade when he witnessed his parents selling diet pills illegally to their co-workers to supplement the family income. As early as age 9, Edmond was bagging pills for his mother and father and also served as a runner for them. Reportedly, he first sold cocaine on behalf of his father.

Edmond attended Dunbar High School where he was voted "most popular" and "best dressed" and where he excelled at basketball. He also was described as "smart" by his teachers with a penchant for both reading and mathematics.

Edmond briefly studied at the University of the District of Columbia and worked as a cook before turning to the drug trade full-time because it was more lucrative. "My mother always wanted a nice big house, and I wanted to be able to buy that for her one day," he once said, and he became the breadwinner and provider for the entire family. Edmond was renowned for his lavish lifestyle that included several luxury cars, custom-made jewelry, and frequent travel. Nevertheless, he remained in the Northeast neighborhood where he engaged with young people and coached a basketball team.

== Criminal career ==
Edmond was alleged to have moved large amounts of cocaine, primarily in predominantly Black neighborhood in Washington, near Gallaudet University and H Street NE. In an indictment involving two of Edmond's associates Dwayne (D.C. Scorpio), it was said that they bought between 1,000 and 2,000 kilos per week in 1992 from the Trujillo-Blanco brothers, who were associated with the Medellin cartel, and sold the drugs to Washington area wholesalers. He was known to have spent some $457,619 in an exclusive Georgetown store (Linea Pitti, specializing in Italian men's clothing) owned by Charles Wynn who was later convicted on 34 counts of money laundering. Edmond's estimated revenue was approximately $300 million annually. In one year, Edmond's organization, which employed 150 people, committed 30 murders.

Remarking on Edmond, longtime D.C. mayor Marion Barry wrote in his autobiography:

He was a young, likable guy, good-looking, with a good personality, and a lot of his friends he played basketball with had no idea that he was involved in drug selling. He was basically pulled into it from his family. That doesn't make it right, but Rayful had a lot of people who liked him and were very loyal to him.

Edmond was a popular figure to many in the Washington, D.C. area and, according to court testimony, he was known to give $100 bills to neighborhood children. Some regarded him as a local hero who played and coached in youth basketball tournaments and who also bought clothes for young people and supported people in a time of need.

== Meeting with John Thompson ==
Edmond was an avid fan of the Georgetown Hoyas, and frequently sat courtside with his entourage at the Capital Centre for home games. At the height of his empire, he became very friendly with several Hoyas players. When Georgetown University head basketball coach (and D.C. native) John Thompson confirmed what was happening, he sent word through his sources to have Edmond meet him at his office at McDonough Gymnasium.

When Edmond arrived, Thompson was initially cordial, and informed Edmond that he needed to cease all contacts with his players, specifically John Turner and Alonzo Mourning, both of whom had befriended Edmond. However, Thompson's parting words to Edmond were that Edmond would face serious consequences if he did not stay away from his players. It is believed that Thompson is the only person to stand up to Edmond without consequence, initially causing some shock and surprise that there was no reprisal against Thompson for it. However, in a memoir published posthumously in December 2020, Thompson characterized the encounter very differently, calling it very respectful. Thompson asked Rayful if he would make sure that Alonzo and John were not wrapped up in any of the illegal activity. Rayful told Thompson that he would take care of it and both men left the meeting in agreement and with respect for each other as human beings. Rayful is quoted as saying afterwards, "Coach Thompson is cool as hell".

== Arrest, trial, and conviction ==
Edmond was arrested on April 15, 1989, at the age of 24. His arrest and subsequent trial were widely covered by local and national media. Judicial officials, fearful of reprisals from members of Edmond's gang, imposed unprecedented security during the trial. Jurors' identities were kept secret before, during, and after trial, and their seating area was enclosed in bulletproof glass. The presiding judge even barred the public from the trial in an effort to protect the jury. Edmond was jailed at the maximum security Marine Corps Brig at Marine Corps Base Quantico in Virginia and flown to the Federal Court House in Washington, D.C. by helicopter each day for his trial. Authorities took this unusual step due to heightened fears of an armed escape attempt.

Edmond was convicted of numerous federal violations: (1) Engaging in a Continuing Criminal Enterprise, under 21 U.S.C. §§ 848(b), 853 (Count One); (2) Conspiracy to distribute and possess with intent to distribute more than 5 kilograms of cocaine and more than 50 grams of cocaine base, under 21 U.S.C. § 846 (Count Two); (3) Unlawfully employing a person under 18 years of age, under 21 U.S.C. § 845b (Count Five); (4) Interstate travel in aid of racketeering, under 18 U.S.C. § 1952(a) (Count Eleven); (5) Unlawful use of a communications facility, under 21 U.S.C. § 843(b) (Counts Fourteen, Fifteen, Sixteen, and Eighteen).

On September 17, 1990, the District Court imposed sentences of mandatory life without parole on Count One, life without parole on Counts Two and Five, 60 months on Count Eleven, and 48 months on Counts Fourteen, Fifteen, Sixteen, and Eighteen. Edmond's sentences were to run concurrently.

Edmond was eventually sentenced to life in prison without parole. His mother, Constance "Bootsie" Perry, was sentenced to 14 years in prison for participating in his criminal enterprise. Several of his sisters and cousins also received sentences.

Edmond continued to deal after being incarcerated in the Lewisburg Federal Penitentiary, in Pennsylvania. He hooked up with Dixon Dario and Osvaldo "Chiqui" Trujillo-Blanco (son of Griselda "Godmother" Trujillo Blanco) who shared the same cell block with him. Edmond was setting up deals between D.C. area traffickers and his Colombian connection while incarcerated. In 1996, Edmond and another drug dealer from Atlanta, named Lowe, were convicted after conducting drug business from a federal prison phone. Edmond received an additional 30-year sentence. In an interview with the Bureau of Prisons, Edmond said he had spent several hours every day on the telephone, occasionally using two lines simultaneously to conduct his drug business. Attorney General Eric Holder criticized the Federal Bureau of Prisons for its lax management that allowed drug deals to be conducted from inside prison.

In 1996, federal authorities revealed that Edmond had become a government informant. With Edmond's cooperation, the government arrested 11 alleged drug dealers working in Washington D.C. In exchange, federal prosecutors agreed to seek a reduced sentence for Edmond's mother.

Edmond remained incarcerated but later became part of the United States Federal Witness Protection Program. The prison where he was held was not publicly disclosed by the government.

In 2019, Edmond returned to D.C. for hearings on whether his life sentence should be reduced to time served based on the information he provided to authorities concerning 20 homicides. At the time, a survey by the District of Columbia Attorney General showed that half of D.C. residents thought Edmond should be released. In 2021, Judge Emmet G. Sullivan granted the government's request for early release, although Edmond has a separate 30-year sentence for running his operation from prison.

== Release and death ==
On July 31, 2024, Edmond was transferred from prison to a halfway house at an undisclosed location in Kentucky or Tennessee under the supervision of the Bureau of Prisons Nashville Residential Reentry Management Office. He died at a halfway house in Miami, Florida on December 17, 2024, from a heart attack. He was 60.

== In popular culture ==
=== In film ===
- Edmond features prominently in the documentary film The Life of Rayful Edmond Vol.1 The Rise and Fall (2005)

=== In music ===
- On his song "Can I Live" (1996), rapper Jay Z says, "No more Big Willie, my game has grown prefer you call me William Illin' for revenues, Rayful Edmond like Channel 7 News."
- Rapper Rick Ross makes reference to Rayful Edmond on the Meek Mill song "Work", Ross says, "Not the Reagan Era but a nigga making cheddar Rayful Edmond in the mirror and I'm never telling."
- Rapper Rick Ross makes reference to Rayful Edmond on his song "I Think She Like Me", Ross says, "I'm Rayful Edmond mixed with young Wale Folarin."
- Rapper Westside Gunn has a song titled "Rayful's Plug" based on Edmond.
- On the song "Brains Flew By" by Westside Gunn, Gunn mentions Rayful again: "Bricks on Bricks like Rayful" – (Bricks being slang for cocaine)
- on his song "Robert Moses" rapper Billy woods mentions Rayful with the words "Rayful Edmond iii when they need another Ricky Ross"

=== In print ===
- Rayful Edmond plays a significant role in Seth Ferranti book Rayful Edmond (2013).

=== In television ===
- Rayful Edmond was featured in episode 9, season 2 of American Gangster.
