= The Life of Rayful Edmond =

The Life of Rayful Edmond Vol. 1 The Rise and Fall
- Movie Poster
- Directed by: Kirk Fraser
- Written by: Kirk Fraser
- Produced by: Kirk Fraser; Curtis "Curtbone" Chambers
- Starring: Rayful Edmond; Melvin Middleton; Clarence "Bootney" Green; Curtbone; Arthur Reynolds; Don Scott; Donald "Goose" Gossage
- Cinematography: Kirk Fraser
- Edited by: Kirk Fraser
- Music by: Damar "G-Cino" Higgs
- Production company: 1Man Production
- Distributed by: May 3rd Films
- Release date: July 12, 2005
- Running time: 75 minutes
- Country: United States
- Language: English

The Life of Rayful Edmond Vol. 1 The Rise and Fall is a documentary film written and directed by Kirk Fraser. It was released by May 3rd Films on July 12, 2005, in Washington DC.

== Cast ==
- Rayful Edmond as himself
- Melvin Middleton as himself
- Clarence "Bootney" Green as himself
- Arthur Reynolds as himself
- Don Scott as himself
- Donald "Goose" Gossage as himself
- Curtis "Curtbone" Chambers as himself
- Don Choo as Royal Brooks
- Erica Terpsta as Alta Rae Zanville
- Clemont Jacob as DEA Agent
- Sean Lorenzo "AP" as himself

== Production ==
In the Fall of 2003, Kirk Fraser began pre-production on the film. Curtis "Curtbone" Chambers joined production as Executive Producer in the Winter of 2004, as a former friend and co-defendant of Rayful Edmond, Curtbone also appears in the film as an insider into the Edmond's drug empire. The 75-minute film intertwine interviews, reenactments and archival news footage from his early days of drug dealing to his arrest, and the trial.

The picture started filming in the fall of 2004 and ended during the winter of 2005 in Washington, DC and Maryland. An official marketing campaign for the film began during the 2004 Howard University homecoming and was continued till its release date.

== Reception ==
The film was sold out within the first two hours from retail stores across the Washington, DC metropolitan area.
