= Samuel Christian =

American mobster and Black Mafia founder

- A mugshot of Christian from 1968
- Born: March 20, 1939; Philadelphia, Pennsylvania, U.S.
- Died: March 6, 2016 (aged 76); Philadelphia, Pennsylvania, U.S.
- Other names: Beyah; Suleiman Bey; Richard Carter
- Allegiance: Black Mafia

Samuel Christian (March 20, 1939 – March 6, 2016) also known as Richard Carter, Sam 'Beyah' Christian, and Suleiman Bey, was an American mobster and the founder of the Philadelphia Black Mafia.

Christian changed his name upon joining the Nation of Islam and eventually became captain in their paramilitary unit, the Fruit of Islam.

== FBI most wanted ==
Christian was the 321st person to be added to the FBI's Ten Most Wanted list as a suspect in the 1972 murder of Tyrone "Fat Ty" Palmer, who was shot in the face at Club Harlem, and as a suspect in the 1973 murder of Major Coxson and shooting of several others at Coxson's residence. Because there were no witnesses willing to testify against him, he was not convicted of either murder.
