= Benito Romano =

Puerto Rican lawyer

United States Attorney for the Southern District of New York Interim
- In office January 1, 1989 – October 16, 1989
- President: Ronald Reagan; George H. W. Bush
- Preceded by: Rudy Giuliani
- Succeeded by: Otto G. Obermaier

Personal details
- Born: 1950 (age 75–76) Bronx, New York
- Children: 5
- Education: New York University (BA); Columbia University (JD)
- Occupation: Lawyer

Benito Romano (born 1950) was the first Puerto Rican to hold a United States Attorney's post in New York on an interim basis.

== Early life and education ==
Romano's parents moved to New York City from Puerto Rico and settled down in the Bronx where he was born and raised. His grandfather, a dairy farmer, immigrated from Palermo, Italy to Puerto Rico and married a local Puerto Rican woman. His family was poor, Romano grew up on Simpson Street in the South Bronx and his father worked in a factory that made cigarette holders.

Romano went to Morris High School where he played in the school's baseball and was good enough to be an All-City second baseman. After graduating from Morris High School Romano went to and graduated from New York University with a Bachelor of Arts in 1972. In 1976, he graduated from Columbia Law School earning his Juris Doctor degree, and becoming the first member of his family to go to college. In 1977, he was admitted to the New York Bar.

== Career ==
=== United States attorney ===
External videos
- Benito Romano's participation in the documentary "Mr. Untouchable"

During his seven years in the office of the United States Attorney for the Southern District, he was chief of the corruption unit under United States Attorney Rudolph W. Giuliani at the height of the municipal scandals. Romano as chief of the public corruption unit, played a crucial role in the negotiations during which Geoffrey A. Lindenauer, an official in the city's Parking Violations Bureau, was persuaded to testify for the Government. Romano later was named associate United States attorney, the third-ranking position.

Joseph A. Califano, Jr., the former Secretary of Health, Education and Welfare, hired Romano as director of the New York State Commission on Government Integrity and later recruited Romano to his law firm.

On February 1, 1989, Romano was named the interim replacement for Giuliani as the Federal prosecutor in Manhattan. Romano has endorsed the major insider-trading cases and the emphasis on drug, organized-crime and government-corruption prosecutions that began in Giuliani's term. When the New York Times headline An Italian Name was published describing the crime-fighting achievement of Romano, he was quick to clarify that he identifies himself as a Puerto Rican and not as an Italian.

On September 7, 1989, President George H. W. Bush nominated Otto G. Obermaier, a defense lawyer, as the permanent successor to Giuliani and on September 22, 1989, Obermaier was confirmed by the United States Senate as Giuliani's successor.

=== Private practice ===
Subsequent to the U.S. Attorney's Office, Romano was a partner for 20 years at the law firm of Willkie Farr & Gallagher, and the leader of their white collar defense practice. He is currently a partner in Freshfields Bruckhaus Deringer's litigation practice group in New York City, and focuses his practice on white collar defense including SEC, FINRA, regulatory enforcement proceedings, and related complex civil litigation.

On April 17, 2006, Romano, who is married and the father of five children, was appointed by New York City Police Commissioner Raymond W. Kelly to serve on the newly created, four-member legal advisory committee to the New York City Police Department.

== See also ==
- List of Puerto Ricans - Judges and law enforcement
- Joe Sánchez
- Louis Diaz
- Nicky Barnes
