= The Council (drug syndicate) =

African-American organized crime syndicate

- Founding location: Harlem, New York City, United States
- Years active: 1972 - 1983
- Territory: Harlem, New York City
- Ethnicity: African American
- Membership: 7
- Activities: Drug trafficking, Murder, Robbery
- Allies: Lucchese Crime Family, East Harlem Purple Gang
- Rivals: Frank Lucas gang, various gangs in New York City including their allies

The Council was an African-American organized crime syndicate in New York City that controlled the heroin trade in the Harlem area of the city during the 1970s. Formed by Nicky Barnes in 1972, the seven-man organization ran the heroin trade in Harlem, handled local criminal disputes, and solved other issues related to the drug trade. The Council was heavily connected to the Italian-American Mafia in New York City, where Matthew Madonna of the Lucchese crime family supplied the group with raw heroin, which was then diluted and distributed in Harlem. At its peak, Council-manufactured heroin began to be distributed across New York State, New Jersey, Pennsylvania,Delaware,Maryland as far west as Arizona, and even into Canada. Nicky Barnes was sentenced to life imprisonment in 1978, and in 1982 he became a federal informant, with his testimony leading to the dissolution of The Council in 1983.

== Members ==
The Council included seven people:

- Leroy "Nicky" Barnes
- Guy Fisher
- Thomas "Gaps" Foreman
- Joseph "Jazz" Hayden
- Frank James
- Ishmael Muhammed
- Wallace Rice

== See also ==
- Frank Lucas
- Bumpy Johnson
- Louis Diaz
