= Hakeem Abdul-Shaheed =

American mobster (born 1959)

- Born: Robert Edward Molley; March 4, 1959 (age 67); Atlantic City, New Jersey, U.S.
- Other name: "Midget Molley"
- Height: 5 ft 2 in (1.57 m)
- Convictions: Attempted murder (1980); Drug trafficking (1990)
- Penalty: Ten years' imprisonment (1980); Nineteen years' imprisonment (1990)

Hakeem Abdul-Shaheed (born Robert Edward Molley; March 4, 1959), also known as Midget Molley, is an American convicted drug dealer and organized crime leader. He acquired the nickname 'Midget' from his family, in reference to his short height. He stands at 5'2".

== Early life ==
Robert "Midget" Molley was born on March 4, 1959, in Atlantic City, New Jersey, to Benjamin Franklin Molley, a Pentecostal pastor, and Helen Louise Molley. He was the ninth of twelve children. The family was religious and strict and Robert would often have to listen to family sermons late into the night. Midget Molley's father died of a brain tumor in 1969, obliging his mother to seek work in local hotels, away from the home where six of the Molley children still lived.

Around the age of six, family members noticed that Robert was not growing at the normal rate as kids his age, thus they began joking by referring to him as a midget. The title stuck and Robert became known as Midget Molley. He reached an adult height of 5 feet 2 inches (157 cm).

In 1976, Midget Molley became a member of the Nation of Islam, under the national leadership of Wallace D. Muhammad. He belonged to Temple #10, located in Atlantic City, New Jersey. In the Nation of Islam he was known as Brother Robert 8X. He subsequently changed his name to Hakeem Ali Abdul-Shaheed to reflect the path the Nation of Islam had taken after the death of Elijah Muhammad.

== 1980s ==
In 1980, Molley was convicted for attempted murder and was sentenced to serve ten years at Bayside State Prison. He was released after serving six years.

Abdul-Shaheed was released and had returned to drug dealing by September 1986. He began trading cocaine supplied by Angel Diaz-Rivera and his wife Gloria, members of Colombia's notorious Medellin cartel of cocaine distributors. Abdul-Shaheed ran a three-member cocaine dealing operation with Victor "Shorty" Fernandez, a Dominican man, and Lucy "Luz" Bertone, a Puerto Rican woman. Each of the three received 600 kilos of cocaine per shipment. Bertone and Fernandez dealt in the Washington Heights section of Manhattan, New York, while Abdul-Shaheed distributed his drugs in New Jersey, Syracuse, New York, Washington, D.C., Maryland and Atlanta, Georgia.

Hakeem Abdul Shaheed (aka Robert E. Molley or Midget Molley), and most of its 60 some members were believed to be Five Percenters. Shaheed, a resident of Atlantic City and Vineland, called his group the ASO Posse and often flaunted his drug-financed wealth by wearing a gold crown valued at around $1.5 million.

On January 1, 1989, Abdul-Shaheed walked into Trump Plaza Hotel and Casino Ballroom wearing his gold crown and surrounded by "his most trusted distributors." Law enforcement personnel were angered by this display of ill-gotten wealth.

=== 1989 conviction ===
In February 1989 Abdul-Shaheed and 20 of his distributors were arrested after a seven-month investigation by the United States Organized Crime Drug Enforcement Task Force. Abdul-Shaheed was suspected of two murders in Atlantic City, one in Syracuse, New York, two in Washington, DC, one in Maryland, and three in Atlanta, Georgia. He was convicted of none.

In 1990 Abdul-Shaheed was convicted of being a drug kingpin and sentenced to over 19 years in Federal prison under the 848 statute. The crown he had worn was never found, though federal agents have photographs of Abdul-Shaheed wearing it. Shortly after Shaheed's arrest, several Jamaican drug dealers from Brooklyn Jamaican Posse moved into the Atlantic City projects to take over his territory.

== 2000s ==
In 2006 Midget Molley was released from prison, and he now lives in Atlantic City. Abdul-Shaheed speaks with young people about "staying free of crime" and also acts as "an advocate for incarcerated Muslims".

Abdul-Shaheed founded the nonprofit organization named "The D=Bear Youth Foundation", which addresses problems with gangs & gang violence, drug use & sales, and teen sex.

== Books ==
In 2007 Ali Rob wrote a novel based on Abdul-Shaheed's life and times, The Myth of Midget Molley. A later book also written by Rob, titled Resurrection of A Legend, also explores Midget Molley's life.
