= Lil' Kim: Countdown to Lockdown =

- Genre: Reality
- Starring: Lil' Kim; Hillary Weston; Latisha 'Lala' Crosby; Kirk Fraser
- Opening theme: "Whoa" and “The Games In Trouble” (both performed by Lil' Kim, latter is unreleased.)
- Country of origin: United States
- No. of seasons: 1
- No. of episodes: 6

Production
- Running time: 30 minutes (with commercials)

Original release
- Network: BET
- Release: March 9 – April 20, 2006

Lil' Kim: Countdown to Lockdown is a reality television series which premiered on March 9, 2006 on BET. The 6-part show followed Lil' Kim's last 14 days of freedom before she entered the Federal Detention Center in Philadelphia, Pennsylvania for a 366-day sentence.

The series never got an official DVD release. It was however released on iTunes in late 2006. It has since been taken down for unknown reasons.

== Cast members ==
- Lil' Kim
- Hillary Weston - Kim's manager
- Kirk Fraser - Video director
- Nate Bassett - Kim's personal assistant
- Latisha 'Lala' Crosby - Kim's cousin/personal assistant
- Gene Nelson - A&R executive for Queen Bee Records
- L. Londell McMillan - Kim's attorney
- Tracy Nguyen - Kim's publicist

== Production and broadcast ==
The original title for the television series was "Lil' Kim Goes to the Big House" and was produced by Queen Bee Productions and Tracey Edmonds of Edmonds Entertainment. The show was filmed in September 2005. Edmonds stated in the Daily Variety that several networks have expressed interest. BET picked the series up and re-titled the show "Countdown To Lockdown".

Almost six months after Lil' Kim's incarceration, the show premiered on BET on March 9, 2006 and, at the time, was the most watched series debut in BET's 25 year-history with 1.9 million viewers nationwide. It was also the highest rated cable original series among black viewers that year. Filming for the second series began shortly after Lil' Kim was released from prison but for unknown reasons, the project was cancelled.

== Promotion ==
On March 8, 2006, the entire cast (with the exception of Lil' Kim) appeared on The Tyra Banks Show and discussed the show before its BET premiere.

== Episodes ==
No.	Title	Original release date
1	"Lighters Up"	March 9, 2006
Viewers are informed about Kim's upcoming prison stay and how it came to be. Kim hates her new video, "Lighter's Up".
2	"Moe & La La"	March 16, 2006
Kim gets approval to re-shoot her "Lighter's Up" video. Her reality show director, Kirk Fraser, is chosen as director.
3	"Video Re-Shoot Drama"	March 30, 2006
Kim re-shoots "Lighter's Up" and still hates the new footage. The "Whoa" video is shot.
4	"Fashion Week"	April 6, 2006
Kim and crew prepare for an exclusive Marc Jacobs fashion show in her honor.
5	"Murphy's Law"	April 13, 2006
Kim says goodbye to her loved ones at an emotional farewell dinner the night before she turns herself in to federal prison.
6	"Farewell"	April 20, 2006
Kim embarks on her journey to Philadelphia in an RV with family and friends. She turns herself in to start her sentence.
