= Fairbank, Pennsylvania =

Unincorporated community in Pennsylvania, US

- Unincorporated community
- Location within Pennsylvania
- Coordinates: 39°56′36″N 79°50′58″W
- Country: United States
- State: Pennsylvania
- County: Fayette
- Elevation: 994 ft (303 m)
- Time zone: UTC-5 (Eastern (EST))
  - Summer (DST): UTC-4 (EDT)
- ZIP code: 15435
- Area codes: 724, 878
- GNIS feature ID: 1174415

Fairbank is an unincorporated community in Fayette County, Pennsylvania, United States. The community is located 7.7 miles (12.4 km) west-northwest of Uniontown. Fairbank has a post office, with ZIP code 15435, which opened on July 30, 1906.
