= Felix Mitchell =

American mobster

- Born: Felix Wayne Mitchell Jr. August 23, 1954; Oakland, California, U.S.
- Died: August 21, 1986 (aged 31); Leavenworth, Kansas, U.S.
- Cause of death: Stabbing
- Other name: "Felix the Cat"
- Occupations: Crime boss; drug trafficker
- Allegiance: 69 Mob
- Penalty: Life imprisonment (1985)

Felix Wayne Mitchell Jr. (August 23, 1954 – August 21, 1986) was a drug lord from Oakland, California, and leader of the "69 Mob" criminal organization, which operated throughout California and into the Midwest. He was known as "Felix the Cat" after the cartoon character.

== History ==
Mitchell was born in Oakland and lived in the 69th Avenue San Antonio Village housing projects. After dropping out of high school, Mitchell created a criminal organization called "My Other Brother", or "6-9 Mob" a.k.a. "MOB". Connected with L.A. kingpin Tootie Reese, he made business contacts in the Bay Area, Los Angeles and Detroit.

For more than a decade, Mitchell battled competition from Mickey Moore's crime family and the Funktown USA gang to gain total control of the heroin market. Before 1984–1985 and the widespread practice of free-basing cocaine, heroin use was more common. It is estimated that Mitchell brought in as much as $5 million annually.

Mitchell was targeted by local and federal law enforcement. He was convicted in 1985 and sentenced to life in prison at Leavenworth Federal Penitentiary where he was fatally stabbed on August 21, 1986, aged 31, a little more than a year later.

== Funeral and notoriety ==
Mitchell's funeral gained national attention as an example of the impact drugs and drug-culture was having on the country's youth. Thousands of people lined the streets to pay their respects as the funeral procession went through Mitchell's old Oakland neighborhood. His body was carried through crowded streets by a horse-drawn carriage trailed by 14 Rolls-Royce limousines and was attended by Black Panther Party co-founder Huey P. Newton. According to an interview with Bay Area radio personality Jimmy Guy: "I remember his funeral, it was like Martin Luther King had died and that coverage went out all over the country. I didn't want my city to just be known for honoring a drug lord."

The service received news coverage internationally. Onlookers lined the streets to watch the procession. The procession began at Mitchell's former residence, the San Antonio Villas and ended at the Star Bethel Baptist Church at San Pablo and Stanford Avenues in Oakland. Many civic leaders and citizens were appalled that the services were allowed to take place at all. Proper permits for the event had been filed.

In 1987, Mitchell's conviction was overturned because he had died before an appeal could be heard.

Criminologists named an effect after him known as the "Felix Mitchell Paradox"—whereby after a major successful police operation (like the arrest of Mitchell) crime and violence both went up instead of down as one might expect. It is thought that Felix had such monopoly power in parts of Oakland that he controlled pricing and policed the violence of smaller gangs. When he was arrested it left a power vacuum and the smaller gangs started both price wars and shooting wars to fill the void.
