= Frank Matthews (drug trafficker) =

American drug trafficker

- Matthews' NYPD mugshot
- Born: Frank Larry Matthews; February 13, 1944; Durham, North Carolina, U.S.
- Disappeared: June 26, 1973 (aged 29); New York, New York, U.S.
- Status: Missing for 53 years, 3 months and 9 days
- Other names: "Black Caesar", "Pee Wee", "Mark IV"
- Occupations: Crime boss, drug trafficker
- Years active: 1960–1973
- Spouse: Barbara Hinton
- Children: 3
- Status: Became a fugitive from justice in 1973
- Criminal charges: Tax evasion, and conspiracy to distribute heroin and cocaine

Frank Larry Matthews (February 13, 1944 – disappeared June 26, 1973), also known as Black Caesar, Mark IV and Pee Wee, was an American drug trafficker and crime boss who sold heroin and cocaine throughout the eastern United States from 1965 to 1972. He operated in 21 states and supplied drug dealers throughout every region of the country. The Drug Enforcement Administration (DEA) ranks Matthews as one of the top ten drug traffickers in U.S. history and he is estimated to have had US$20 million in savings.

Matthews led a flamboyant lifestyle, with luxury homes, vehicles and clothing along with prime seats at sporting events and regular trips to Las Vegas to launder money and gamble. He hosted an African-American and Hispanic drug dealers' summit in Atlanta in 1971 and another in Las Vegas in 1972 to discuss how to break the American Mafia's control of heroin importation. Matthews was arrested in 1973 on tax evasion and drug charges but disappeared afterward.

== Early life ==
Frank Matthews was born on February 13, 1944, in Durham, North Carolina. His mother died when he was four years old and he was raised by his aunt, Marzella Steele, the wife of a lieutenant in the Durham Police Department. He was nicknamed "Pee Wee" in his youth and attended the East End Elementary school but dropped out in the seventh grade.

At age 14, Matthews led a teenaged gang in stealing chickens from local farms. When confronted by a farmer, Matthews assaulted him with a brick. He was arrested in October 1960 and served a year for theft and assault at the Raleigh State Reformatory for Boys. Upon his release, Matthews moved to Philadelphia, Pennsylvania, where he worked as a numbers writer. He made contacts that would become his future Philadelphia drug connections, including Major Coxson and members of the Black Mafia. Matthews was arrested in 1963 and avoided conviction by agreeing to leave Philadelphia.

Matthews moved to the Bedford–Stuyvesant area of Brooklyn, New York, and became a barber, collecting numbers as he had in Philadelphia, as well as working as a loan shark and enforcer.

== Criminal career ==
In 1965, Matthews grew tired of the numbers game. In order to make more money, he transitioned into the heroin trade. During this period, the main supply of wholesale heroin came from the American Mafia through their famed French Connection. Matthews attempted to partner with the Gambino and Bonanno crime families, but both organizations declined. Matthews then approached a criminal acquaintance named "Spanish Raymond" Márquez, a prolific Harlem numbers operator, who put him in contact with Cuban mafia boss Rolando Lucas Gonzalez Nuñez, a partner in a gambling casino on San Andres Island, Colombia and a major cocaine supplier. Shortly before fleeing to Venezuela to avoid an indictment, Gonzalez sold Matthews his first kilogram of cocaine for $20,000, with a promise to supply more in the future.

The relationship between Matthews and Gonzalez expanded into a lucrative and expansive drug trafficking network, with Gonzalez regularly sending large loads of cocaine and heroin from South America. Matthews expanded on this and, within a year, was one of the major players in the New York drug trade. Realizing the need for diversification, he would continually seek out new sources of supply for narcotics, willing to do business with anyone as long as the product was sufficiently pure. He also developed a cocaine dependence that grew along with his business and power.

By the early 1970s, the Matthews organization was handling multimillion-dollar loads of heroin, with Matthews himself earning an estimated $10 million in 1972 (equivalent to $77,000,000 in 2025). According to the Drug Enforcement Administration (DEA), "Matthews controlled the cutting, packaging, and sale of heroin in every major East Coast city." In New York, he operated two massive drug mills in Brooklyn: one located at 925 Prospect Place, nicknamed the "Ponderosa", and the other at 101 East 56th Street, nicknamed the "OK Corral". Both locations were heavily fortified and secured, with walls reinforced with steel and concrete and protected by guards with automatic weapons. Besides controlling the retail sale of heroin, the Matthews organization supplied other major dealers throughout the East Coast with multi-kilogram shipments for up to $26,000 per kilogram. Matthews was known to supply heroin to Philadelphia through Major Coxson, who then sold it to the Black mafia.

Matthews purchased a house at 7 Buttonwood Rd in the Mafia enclave in Todt Hill, Staten Island, three blocks from Gambino family boss Paul Castellano, who lived on Benedict Rd. Matthews would take multiple trips to Las Vegas with suitcases full of cash to have his drug money laundered at casinos for a fee of 15–18%.

In 1971, Matthews invited major African-American and Hispanic drug traffickers throughout the country to attend a meeting in Atlanta, Georgia, to discuss means of importing heroin without Mafia involvement. The DEA became aware of the meeting and monitored who attended. Those present decided to build stronger independent relationships with the Corsican mafia and possibly the Cuban mafia. In addition, they agreed to diversify their product to include cocaine, which was becoming available in massive quantities.

The Atlanta meeting was significant because it underscored the changing nature of the drug business. Whereas previously the American Mafia controlled the importing and wholesaling of narcotics, therefore controlling who could and could not advance past them, now others were establishing their own pipelines. Before, the Mafia asserted behind-the-scenes control of the business while African-Americans sold and used the drugs in their cities; now the black dealers established connections and took control of their neighborhoods. This later evolved to include not just black people controlling the business, but also local black gangs eliminating out-of-town black suppliers trying to control their neighborhoods from a distance.

Matthews' clashes with the Philadelphia Black Mafia resulted in bloodshed on Easter Sunday 1972, when Tyrone "Mr. Millionaire" Palmer, Matthews' main dealer in Philadelphia, was killed in a gunfight at an Atlantic City nightclub. Many innocent bystanders were shot during the gunfight, with five people killed and twenty-six injured. No one was prosecuted for the crime and none of the 799 potential witnesses came forward. Three of Matthews' top lieutenants were also murdered by the Black Mafia.

Later in 1972, Matthews held another summit in Las Vegas at the Sands Hotel during the Muhammad Ali vs. Jerry Quarry boxing rematch. Soon afterward, police received authority to tap Matthews' phone lines, resulting in recordings of Matthews discussing drug transactions.

== Arrest and disappearance ==
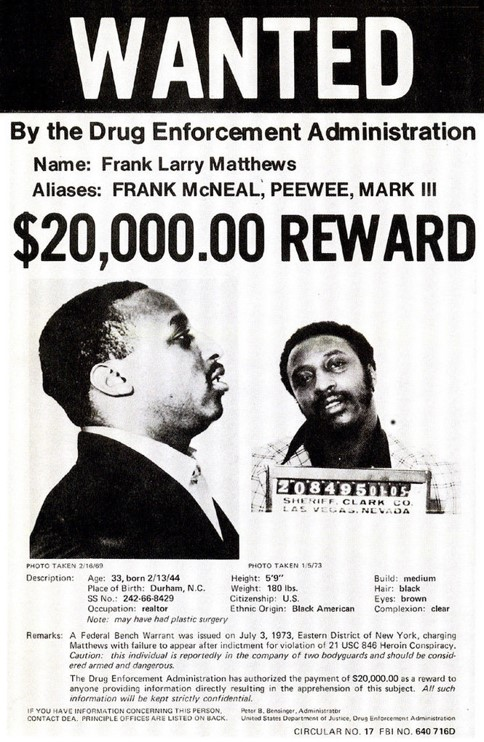
A wanted poster issued by the DEA

In December 1972, Matthews was indicted by federal prosecutors in Brooklyn for attempting to sell 40 pounds of cocaine in Miami, Florida, between April and September 1972. In January 1973, the DEA arrested Matthews at McCarran International Airport in Las Vegas, ahead of a planned trip to Los Angeles with his girlfriend, on charges of tax evasion and conspiracy to distribute heroin and cocaine. A federal magistrate originally set bail at $5 million, the highest bail amount ever set at the time. Bail was reduced to $2.5 million when Matthews agreed to not fight extradition to New York. After a few weeks in detention in New York, Matthews' bail was further reduced to $325,000. He was indicted on six counts of tax evasion and conspiracy to distribute heroin and cocaine and faced 50 years in prison.

In April 1973, Ernie "Coco" Coralluzzo, an associate of the Genovese crime family's Greenwich Village Crew, negotiated the sale of 40 kilograms of heroin to Matthews for $375,000 during a meeting at the Waldorf Astoria New York. While Matthews delivered the fee via an intermediary the following day, Coralluzzo failed to provide the drugs and instead fled to the Bahamas. Matthews and his associates then kidnapped James "Big Jimmy" Capotorto, an underling and bodyguard to Coralluzzo, in an effort to retrieve the money. Upon hearing of the kidnapping, Coralluzzo took a flight back to New York, returned the $375,000 to Matthews and gave him 25 kilograms of heroin on consignment.

On July 2, 1973, Matthews was scheduled to appear in a Brooklyn courthouse but never showed. He allegedly took $20 million and fled the country with his girlfriend. Matthews left behind his common-law wife, their three sons and their Staten Island mansion and was never seen again. The Federal Bureau of Investigation (FBI) placed a $20,000 reward for Matthews, the highest set by a federal agency since the Bureau placed the same amount for the capture of bank robber John Dillinger.

According to former DEA agent Frank Panessa, the Administration received unconfirmed reports that Matthews had been lured to the Bahamas by the Genovese family and killed, partly to keep him from turning state's witness and partly due to his feud with Coralluzzo.

== See also ==
- List of fugitives from justice who disappeared
