= Nicky Barnes =

American convicted drug trafficker (1933–2012)

- Barnes' NYPD mugshot
- Born: Leroy Nicholas Barnes; October 15, 1933; New York City, New York, U.S.
- Died: June 18, 2012 (aged 78)
- Other names: Nicky Barnes; "Mr. Untouchable"
- Status: Deceased
- Allegiance: The Council
- Conviction: Drug trafficking (1978)
- Penalty: Life imprisonment without the possibility of parole (1978)

Leroy Nicholas Barnes (October 15, 1933 – June 18, 2012) was an American crime boss, active in New York City during the 1970s.

In 1972, Barnes formed The Council, a seven-man African-American organized crime syndicate that controlled a significant part of the heroin trade in the Harlem area of New York City. Barnes led The Council into an international drug trafficking ring, in partnership with the Italian-American Mafia, until his arrest in 1977. Barnes was sentenced to life imprisonment, eventually becoming a federal informant that led to the collapse of The Council in 1982. Barnes was living under the United States Marshals Service in Witness protection at the time of his death, and his obituary appeared in The New York Times seven years after his death.

In 2007, Barnes released a book, Mr. Untouchable, written with Tom Folsom, and a documentary DVD of the same title about his life.

== Early life and career ==
Leroy Nicholas Barnes was born on October 15, 1933, in Harlem, New York City, into an African-American family. A good student in his youth, Barnes left home early to escape his abusive alcoholic father, turning to drug dealing for income. Barnes himself became addicted to heroin for several years in his 20s until spending time in jail, when he ended his addiction. Barnes was sent to prison in 1965 for low-level drug dealing, and while in prison he met "Crazy" Joe Gallo, a capo in the Colombo crime family, and Matthew Madonna, a heroin dealer for the Lucchese crime family. Gallo wanted to have a greater presence in the Harlem heroin market, but did not have any personnel to deal in the predominantly African-American areas. It is believed Gallo passed on his knowledge of how to run a drug trafficking organization to Barnes, and asked him to assemble the necessary personnel. When Gallo was released from jail, he provided a lawyer for Barnes, who subsequently had his conviction overturned on a technicality. On his return to New York City, Barnes began to assemble his personnel, and began cutting and packaging heroin.

== The Council ==
In 1972, to deal more efficiently with other black gangsters in Harlem, Barnes founded The Council, a seven-man organization consisting of Barnes, Joseph "Jazz" Hayden, Wallace Rice, Thomas "Gaps" Foreman, Ishmael Muhammed, Frank James, and Guy Fisher. The Council was modelled after the Italian-American Mafia families, where it settled disputes among the criminals, and handled distribution problems and other drug trade-related issues.

By 1976, Barnes' operation spread throughout all of New York State and into Pennsylvania and Canada. According to Drug Enforcement Administration (DEA) records, Barnes' operation in 1976 consisted of seven lieutenants, who each controlled a dozen mid-level distributors, who in turn supplied upwards of 40 street level dealers each.

Barnes set up front companies to protect some of his assets, such as numerous car dealerships, which appeared to be rented through those companies. The DEA eventually discovered the true ownership of the companies and seized the cars, including a Bentley, a Citroën SM, a Maserati, a Mercedes-Benz, a yellow Volvo, and several Cadillacs, Lincoln Continentals, and Ford Thunderbirds. Barnes' net worth had reached over $50 million at the height of his career. A New York Times article estimated Barnes purchased hundreds of tailor-made suits, Italian shoes, coats, and jewelry, which alone was valued at over $7 million. During this time, Barnes had become the dominant drug lord in Harlem, and was given the name "Mr. Untouchable" after successfully beating numerous charges and arrests. It is believed while under surveillance, Barnes would often execute multiple pointless stop-and-go maneuvers on high-speed chases with little purpose other than to aggravate those following him. The Council also employed contract killers, including Robert "Willie Sanchez" Young.

== Arrest and conviction ==
On June 5, 1977, The New York Times Magazine released an article titled "Mr. Untouchable", featuring Barnes posing on the front cover. The magazine told Barnes that they were going to use a mug shot of Barnes unless he posed for the cameras. Barnes, who hated mug shots, agreed and took the shot. In response to Barnes' apparent confidence in his own invulnerability, President Jimmy Carter ordered the Justice Department to intensify its efforts to prosecute him. The resulting prosecution saw Barnes convicted for drug-related crimes and sentenced to life in prison without the possibility of parole on January 19, 1978. The chief prosecutor in the case was Robert B. Fiske, then the United States Attorney for the Southern District of New York.

=== Prison ===
According to Barnes, while in prison he discovered that his assets were not being maintained, and The Council had stopped paying his attorneys' fees. Barnes discovered that one of his fellow Council members, Guy Fisher, was having an affair with Barnes' mistress. The Council had a rule that no council member would sleep with another Council member's wife or mistress, so in response Barnes decided to become a federal informant. He forwarded a list of 109 names, five of them Council members', along with his wife's name, implicating them all in illegal activities related to the heroin trade. Barnes helped to indict 44 other traffickers, 16 of whom were ultimately convicted. In his testimony, he implicated himself in eight murders. While in prison, he also won a national poetry contest for federal inmates, earned a college diploma with honors, and taught fellow inmates English.

== Release and life after prison ==
After Barnes cooperated with the government by working as an informant, Rudolph Giuliani sought a reversal of Barnes' life sentence. Eventually, Barnes was resentenced to 35 years. By working in jail, he earned two months off his sentence for every one he served, and was released in August 1998.

In 2007, Barnes and his former competitor, Frank Lucas, sat down with New York magazine's Mark Jacobson for a conversation between men who had not spoken to each other in three decades.

Barnes became part of the United States Federal Witness Protection Program. His memoir, Mr. Untouchable: My Crimes and Punishments, was published in 2007, and he appeared in a documentary about his gang life, also titled Mr. Untouchable (2007). On January 31, 2008, Howard Stern interviewed Barnes on Stern's Sirius Satellite Radio show.

=== Death ===
Barnes died from cancer on June 18, 2012; however, because he was under witness protection, his death was not contemporaneously reported under his birth name, and news of his death only became known in June 2019.

== Depictions in media ==
- A character based on Barnes was portrayed by Sean "Diddy" Combs in the film Carlito's Way: Rise to Power (2005). Starring Jay Hernandez, directed by Martin Bregman.
- Barnes was portrayed by Cuba Gooding Jr. in the film American Gangster (2007), starring Denzel Washington as Frank Lucas and directed by Ridley Scott.
- Barnes was portrayed by Derrick Baskin in the mini-series The Offer (2022).

== See also ==
- Louis Diaz
- Ellsworth Raymond "Bumpy" Johnson
- Frank Matthews (drug trafficker)
- Benito Romano
