= Louis Diaz =

American DEA agent (1946–2025)

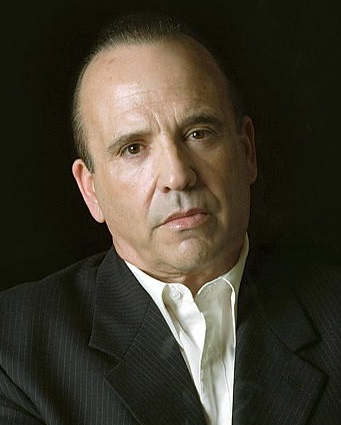
- Diaz in 2006
- Born: Luis Diaz; February 25, 1946; New York City, U.S.
- Died: May 12, 2025 (aged 79); Costa Mesa, California, U.S.
- Education: Queens College, New York
- Years active: 1974–1996
- Organization: Drug Enforcement Administration
- Agent: DEA Agent
- Awards: Administrators DEA Distinguished Service Award; Sustained Superior Performance; Excellence of Performance Awards; NYPD Legion of Honor
- Military career
- Allegiance: United States of America
- Branch: United States Army
- Service years: 1964–1966
- Rank: Specialist 4th Class (Corporal)
- Unit: 3rd Armored Division
- Other work: Author

Louis Diaz (born Luis Diaz; February 25, 1946 – May 12, 2025) was an American Drug Enforcement Administration (DEA) agent who was largely responsible for the arrest and conviction of New York drug kingpin Nicky Barnes. He was also instrumental in dismantling "The Council," Barnes's drug trafficking organization. As an undercover agent, he also brought down members of the Medellin Cartel. Diaz was also an author and actor.

== Life and career ==
Diaz was born in New York City on February 25, 1946, and grew up in Red Hook, Brooklyn. He was the son of Spanish parents from the north of Spain. Diaz attended Most Holy Trinity High School in Brooklyn. After he graduated, he studied at St. Francis College, also in Brooklyn and at Queens College in Queens, New York, where he received his B.A. degree. In 1964, Diaz was a welterweight boxing finalist in the New York Daily News Golden Gloves.

Diaz served in the United States Army. He was stationed in Germany where, as an amateur boxer, he won the 3rd Armored Division's middleweight championship.

In 1971, Diaz was hired by the Bureau of Alcohol, Tobacco and Firearms (ATF) where he served as an undercover agent. While at ATF, Diaz made many high-profile gun cases and arrested many organized crime members.

In 1975, Diaz was hired by the Drug Enforcement Administration (DEA) in New York City where he served 28 years as a special agent, 22 of which were spent working in an extensive undercover capacity.

Diaz died from complications of Parkinson's disease in Costa Mesa, California, on May 12, 2025, at the age of 79.

== Nicky Barnes organization investigation ==
In 1975, Diaz's talents as an undercover agent caught the attention of his DEA superiors who assigned Diaz to the Nicky Barnes investigation. During the course of this investigation, Diaz infiltrated the Barnes organization at its highest levels, purchasing heroin and laundering money for Barnes' immediate subordinates and obtaining direct evidence against Barnes himself. Diaz spent one year around Barnes and his associates. Barnes was subsequently arrested and convicted on a myriad of drug charges including conspiracy. Barnes was sentenced to life in prison without possibility of parole. Diaz was also largely responsible for "taking down" all of the primary members of Barnes' drug trafficking organization known as the "Council."

This case involved the direct intervention of President Carter who ordered the then U.S. Attorney General, Griffin Bell, to see that Barnes was tried and convicted to the full extent of the law. The Barnes case was the first federal trial in the United States in which an anonymous jury was impaneled because of Barnes' reputation to coerce or bribe the witnesses.

=== Operation Henry ===
In 1982, Diaz was then involved in Operation Henry, an undercover investigation. Diaz and his partner worked with members of Scotland Yard in London in pursuit of a gang of British criminals who were involved in the sale and distribution of large quantities of heroin. During the course of this investigation, Diaz and his partner negotiated the sale of forty kilos of heroin with Ron Leslie, the principal subject.

Leslie was responsible for the escape of Ronald Biggs from Wandsworth Prison. Biggs was one of the gang responsible for the 2.6 million pound Great Train Robbery in 1963. This case was the first time that DEA agents served as agent provocateurs for a country other than the United States. Subsequent to the arrest of Leslie, British authorities seized the 40 kilos of heroin.

=== Operation Pisces ===
In 1986, Diaz was one of the principal undercover agents in Operation Pisces, an international operation involving Colombia and Panama. During the course of the investigation, Diaz laundered over 50 million dollars for members of the Medellin cartel including Jose Lopez and Alfonso Reyes, who were close associates of Pablo Escobar. Lopez and Reyes were subsequently arrested in a major dragnet which saw the arrest of over 350 defendants nationwide and the seizure of over 9 tons of cocaine and over 100 million dollars in cash and assets. According to the former U.S. Attorney General, Edwin Meese, Operation Pisces remains the largest most successful undercover drug investigation in the history of the United States.

=== Operation Blast Furnace ===
In 1988, the United States government, along with Victor Paz Estenssoro's government in Bolivia, launched Operation Blast Furnace, whose mission was to eradicate Bolivia's illegal coca producing fields and clandestine cocaine-producing laboratories located in the Chupari and Bene jungle regions. Diaz was a major participant. He flew 26 missions with the 210th combat air-wing out of Panama. Together with members of the 210th, he helped identify and destroy 16 clandestine cocaine laboratories.

== Acting career ==
Diaz, whose nickname while in the DEA was "Louie the actor", embarked on an acting career after his days as a DEA agent were over. He chose the stage name "Lou Casal". He participated in over twenty major TV series, several Hollywood plays and movies. Diaz was featured in the documentary where he talked about growing up and how his relationship with his father influenced his life. His TV and movie credits are:

1. Lands End, co-star
2. NYPD Blue, co-star
3. Pretender, star
4. Las Vegas, co-star
5. Fairly Legal, co-star
6. V.I.P., recurring role
7. Robbery Homicide, co-star
8. Time of your Life, co-star
9. LA Heat, co-star
10. Arliss, co-star
11. Kingpin, recurring role
12. Sabrina, co-star
13. Dangerous Waters, co-star
14. Down and Dirty, featured
15. Ripple, star
16. With friends like these, featured
17. Pure Danger, co-star
18. For which he stands, featured
19. Hitman's Run, featured

Theater:

1. The Andersonville Trial, Brooklyn Hall Academy Theater
2. Detective Story, Marilyn Monroe Theater, Hollywood
3. View from the Bridge, Marilyn Monroe Theater, Hollywood

== Written work ==
Diaz wrote the book Dancing with the Devil: Confessions of an Undercover Agent, published in 2010 by Simon and Schuster's digital book department.

== Legacy ==
In 1985, Diaz became the first federal agent from the DEA to be inducted into the NYPD Honor Legion as a full member. The Honor Legion was conceived and formed in January 1912 by Patrolman John W. Frazer. Membership normally requires that the officer be an "Honor Man", a sobriquet given to an officer who has previously been awarded a medal, typically on the occasion of the Annual Police Parade. Diaz was also the New York State Police and international police middleweight boxing champion.

== See also ==
- Benito Romano
- Joe Pistone
- Joe Sanchez
- Nicky Barnes
