= Guy Fisher =

American former drug trafficker linked to Harlem's Apollo Theater

- Born: Guy Thomas Fisher; July 21, 1947 (age 79); New York City, U.S.
- Known for: Member of The Council; reported involvement with the Apollo Theater (1978)

Guy Thomas Fisher (born July 21, 1947) is an American former drug trafficker who was identified in federal prosecutions as a member of The Council, a Harlem heroin consortium led by Leroy "Nicky" Barnes. In 1984 he was convicted of operating a continuing criminal enterprise and related racketeering offenses and was sentenced to life imprisonment without parole. During his incarceration Fisher completed multiple academic degrees, culminating in a Ph.D. in sociology, and mentored other inmates. In October 2020 the Southern District of New York granted him compassionate release, reducing his sentence to time served.

Fisher is also widely reported to have acquired and reopened the Apollo Theater in 1978; the theater’s official history instead refers to a brief reopening under “new management” before its 1981 purchase by Percy Sutton.

== Early life ==
Fisher was born in 1947 and raised in the Patterson Houses, a public housing project in the South Bronx. He was the oldest of five children. Accounts from later interviews describe a turbulent household marked by his father’s alcoholism and domestic abuse. As a teenager he was arrested for assault and spent about two years in the Elmira reformatory for juveniles. Afterward, he left school and began hustling small items such as shopping bags and clothing out of the trunk of his car.

== Entry into crime and the Council ==
In the early 1970s Fisher came under the influence of Harlem heroin trafficker Leroy “Nicky” Barnes, who recruited him into a network of trusted associates. In 1972 Barnes and six others organized a cooperative known as the Council to coordinate heroin distribution in Harlem. Fisher, more than a decade younger than Barnes, became one of the seven members and was often described as Barnes’s protégé. The group pooled resources to buy heroin in bulk, set rules of conduct, and divided profits, modeling themselves on Italian-American crime families.

Fisher’s street nickname was “Radio,” a reference to his constant chatter on Bronx basketball courts. Charismatic and outwardly generous, he became a visible community figure while simultaneously expanding his narcotics business. Reports note that he drove luxury cars and sponsored Thanksgiving turkey giveaways and youth basketball tournaments, cultivating a “Robin Hood” image in Harlem.

== 1974 arrest and trunk money case ==
On September 30, 1974, Fisher was stopped by New York City police officers in Manhattan after making a lane change without signaling. He presented a driver’s license in another man’s name, raising the officers’ suspicions. After taking him to the precinct, police conducted an inventory search of his car and discovered a bag containing approximately $103,000 in cash in the trunk.

He was prosecuted in New York state court on bribery and criminal impersonation charges and served roughly one year in custody. Later commentators noted that this period behind bars removed him from Council operations during an intense phase of federal surveillance, inadvertently shielding him from exposure in the government’s early wiretaps.

== 1977 federal trial and hung jury ==
In September 1977 federal prosecutors brought a racketeering case against Leroy “Nicky” Barnes and members of the Council, including Fisher, charging them with narcotics trafficking and conspiracy. The government introduced wiretap evidence and testimony from cooperating witnesses. Because of concerns about jury tampering, the case was tried before an anonymous jury, a measure then rarely used in federal court.

The trial lasted several months. In November 1977 the jury found Barnes guilty of operating a continuing criminal enterprise and related offenses, resulting in a life sentence without parole. The panel could not reach a unanimous verdict on the charges against Fisher, producing a hung jury in his case. Prosecutors chose not to retry him at that time, and Fisher returned to Harlem, where he expanded his business interests and became increasingly associated with the Apollo Theater.

== Apollo Theater (1978–1981) ==
After the 1977 mistrial, Fisher expanded his legitimate business ventures and is widely reported to have acquired and reopened the Apollo Theater in 1978.

The Apollo Theater’s official history records that it reopened briefly in 1978 under new management, closed again in 1979, and was purchased in 1981 by a group led by Percy Sutton.

Although Fisher is not named in the theater’s official timeline, his association with the Apollo is described in interviews and later retrospectives, contributing to a public image that mixed cultural patronage with ongoing law-enforcement scrutiny.

== Barnes’s cooperation and 1983–1984 convictions ==
In 1982 Leroy “Nicky” Barnes, serving a life sentence, agreed to cooperate with federal prosecutors after learning that Fisher had been romantically involved with Barnes’s mistress. Acting as a government witness, Barnes gave testimony that directly implicated Fisher and other members of the Council in large-scale narcotics trafficking and related crimes. His cooperation led to a wide-ranging federal indictment in 1983 that named Fisher alongside several associates.

Fisher’s trial opened in early 1984 in the Southern District of New York and lasted more than ten weeks. Prosecutors presented Barnes’s testimony along with surveillance records, financial documents, and witness statements. The jury convicted Fisher on multiple counts, including racketeering, conspiracy, and operating a continuing criminal enterprise. In October 1984 he was sentenced to life in prison without the possibility of parole. The Second Circuit Court of Appeals upheld his conviction in 1985.

== Imprisonment and education ==
Following his 1984 conviction, Fisher began serving a life sentence without parole in the federal prison system. During his incarceration he pursued higher education, completing a bachelor’s degree, a master’s degree, and ultimately earning a Ph.D. in sociology.

Fisher also became active in mentoring younger inmates and speaking about rehabilitation, emphasizing education as a pathway away from crime.

Accounts from journalists and later interviews describe him as a respected figure in prison who used his education and experience to encourage others to study, write, and plan for life after release.

== Compassionate release ==
In 2020 Fisher applied for compassionate release under provisions of the First Step Act, citing his age, health conditions, and decades already served in custody. On October 9, 2020, Judge John F. Keenan of the Southern District of New York granted the motion, reducing Fisher’s sentence to time served after more than 35 years in prison.

In its opinion, the court noted Fisher’s educational accomplishments, his record of mentoring other prisoners, and his demonstrated rehabilitation. The ruling emphasized that continued incarceration was not necessary given his age and the risks posed by COVID-19 to vulnerable inmates. Fisher was released from federal custody on October 28, 2020.

== Post-release and legacy ==
After his release in 2020, Fisher gave interviews describing his transformation from drug trafficker to educator, highlighting his academic work and his belief in rehabilitation through scholarship. He collaborated with producer and choreographer Debbie Allen on a proposed film and television project about his life story, announced in late 2020.

Fisher’s life continues to resonate in popular culture. He has been referenced in numerous hip-hop tracks, including Cam’ron’s “Get It In Ohio,” Jadakiss’s “Shoot Outs,” Roc Marciano’s “Richard Gear,” Gucci Mane’s “Dead Man,” and Jae Millz’s “Guy Fisher.” He was also profiled in BET’s American Gangster (Season 3, Episode 7).

Fisher is related to two public figures: rapper G. Fisher, identified in interviews as his son, and professional basketball player Corey Fisher, who has described his uncle’s life as both a cautionary tale and a source of inspiration.

== Popular culture ==
=== Music ===
Fisher has been mentioned in numerous hip hop songs: "G-Unit - "Ready or Not" (Tony Yayo verse)

- Roc Marciano - “Richard Gear”
- Gucci Mane - “Dead Man” featuring Young Scooter Trae tha Truth
- CamRon - "Get it in Ohio"
- Jadakiss - "Shoot Outs" featuring Styles P
- Jae Millz - "Guy Fisher" featuring Vado
- Pusha T - "Alone in Vegas"
- Pusha T - "TKO Remix"
- G. Twilight - "Maybe, Just Maybe"
- Nuk - Woop Like Me
- Snap Capone - The Opening

=== Television ===
- BET’s American Gangster profiled Fisher in Season 3, Episode 7.
- The 2007 documentary *The Guy Fisher Story* focused on his rise and fall in Harlem.
- In 2020 producer Debbie Allen announced development of a film and television project based on his life.
