= Ja Rule discography =

- Studio albums: 7
- Compilation albums: 2
- Singles: 20
- Mixtapes: 2

The discography of Ja Rule, an American rapper. He has released seven studio albums and twenty singles.

== Albums ==
=== Studio albums ===
List of studio albums, with selected chart positions, sales figures and certifications
Title	Album details	Peak chart positions										Certifications	Sales
Title	Album details	US	US R&B	AUS	CAN	GER	IRE	NL	NZ	SWI	UK	Certifications	Sales
Venni Vetti Vecci	Released: June 1, 1999; Label: Murder Inc., Def Jam; Format: CD, LP, cassette, digital download	3	1	—	20	—	—	—	—	—	176	RIAA: Platinum	US: 1,622,000
Rule 3:36	Released: October 10, 2000; Label: Murder Inc., Def Jam; Format: CD, LP, cassette, digital download	1	1	—	8	72	—	44	—	—	83	RIAA: 3× Platinum; BPI: Silver; MC: Platinum	US: 3,365,000
Pain Is Love	Released: October 2, 2001; Label: Murder Inc., Def Jam; Format: CD, LP, cassette, digital download	1	1	6	3	38	24	17	1	28	3	RIAA: 3× Platinum; ARIA: Platinum; BPI: 2× Platinum; MC: 3× Platinum; RMNZ: Platinum	US: 3,662,125
The Last Temptation	Released: November 19, 2002; Label: Murder Inc., Def Jam; Format: CD, LP, cassette, digital download	4	2	29	19	50	30	34	11	27	14	RIAA: Platinum; ARIA: Gold; BPI: Gold; MC: Platinum	
Blood in My Eye	Released: November 4, 2003; Label: Murder Inc., Def Jam; Format: CD, LP, cassette, digital download	6	1	79	32	98	—	—	—	92	51		US: 470,000
R.U.L.E.	Released: November 9, 2004; Label: Murder Inc., Def Jam; Format: CD, LP, digital download	7	3	—	34	44	67	—	—	50	33	RIAA: Gold; BPI: Silver	US: 660,000 (as of 2007)
Pain Is Love 2	Released: February 28, 2012; Label: Mpire, Fontana; Format: CD, LP, digital download	197	34	—	—	—	—	—	—	—	—		US: 3,200
"—" denotes a recording that did not chart or was not released in that territory.

=== Compilation albums ===
List of compilation albums, with selected chart positions and sales figures
Title	Album details	Peak chart positions				Certifications	Sales
Title	Album details	US	US R&B	US Rap	UK	Certifications	Sales
Exodus	Released: December 6, 2005; Label: Murder Inc., Def Jam; Format: CD, LP, digital download	107	23	13	50	BPI: Silver	US: 100,000
Icon	Released: January 10, 2012; Label: Motown; Format: CD, Digital download	—	34	18	—		
"—" denotes a recording that did not chart or was not released in that territory.

== Mixtapes ==
Title	Mixtape details
Atkins Files Vol. 1	Released: 2008; Label: Mpire; Format: Digital download
The Mirror	Released: July 31, 2009; Label: Mpire; Format: Digital download

== Singles ==
=== As lead artist ===
List of singles as lead artist, with selected chart positions and certifications, showing year released and album name
Title	Year	Peak chart positions										Certifications	Album
Title	Year	US	US R&B/HH	US Rap	AUS	CAN	GER	IRE	NL	NZ	UK	Certifications	Album
"Holla Holla"	1999	35	11	2	—	15	—	—	—	—	—		Venni Vetti Vecci
"Between Me and You" (featuring Christina Milian)	2000	11	5	11	—	—	—	—	48	—	26		Rule 3:36
"Put It on Me" (featuring Lil' Mo and Vita)	2000	8	2	11	—	—	—	—	7	—	—	BPI: Silver; RMNZ: Gold	Rule 3:36
"6 Feet Underground"	2000	—	53	25	—	—	—	—	—	—	—		Rule 3:36
"I Cry" (featuring Lil' Mo)	2001	40	11	25	—	—	—	—	—	—	—		Rule 3:36
"Livin' It Up" (featuring Case)	2001	6	4	4	6	—	—	20	29	32	5	BPI: Gold; RMNZ: Platinum	Pain Is Love
"Always on Time" (featuring Ashanti)	2001	1	1	1	3	2	22	22	11	2	6	ARIA: Gold; BPI: 2× Platinum; RMNZ: 3× Platinum	Pain Is Love
"Down Ass Bitch" (featuring Charli Baltimore)	2002	21	8	5	37	—	—	—	55	—	91		Pain Is Love
"Thug Lovin'" (featuring Bobby Brown)	2002	42	16	10	7	10	36	26	21	23	15	ARIA: Gold	The Last Temptation
"Mesmerize" (featuring Ashanti)	2003	2	5	2	5	19	71	19	33	3	12	ARIA: Platinum; BPI: Gold; RMNZ: 2× Platinum	The Last Temptation
"Reign"	2003	—	—^{[A]}	—	5	—	4	20	35	—	9	ARIA: Platinum; BVMI: Gold	The Last Temptation
"Clap Back"	2003	44	17	12	43	—	39	20	—	47	9		Blood in My Eye
"Wonderful" (featuring R. Kelly and Ashanti)	2004	5	3	2	6	—	20	12	15	6	1	RIAA: Gold; ARIA: Gold; BPI: Silver	R.U.L.E.
"New York" (featuring Fat Joe and Jadakiss)	2004	27	14	10	—	—	—	—	—	—	—		R.U.L.E.
"Caught Up" (featuring Lloyd)	2005	—	65	—	34	—	—	20	80	—	20		R.U.L.E.
"Uh-Ohhh!" (featuring Lil Wayne)	2007	—	69	—	—	—	—	—	—	—	—		The Mirror
"Body" (featuring Ashley Joi)	2007	—	71	—	—	—	—	—	—	—	—		The Mirror
"Real Life Fantasy" (featuring Anita Louise)	2011	—	—	—	—	—	—	—	—	—	—		Pain Is Love 2
"Blow" (featuring Somong)	2021	—	—	—	—	—	—	—	—	—	—		Non-album single
"Mama" (featuring Sada James)	2024	—	—	—	—	—	—	—	—	—	—		TBA
"—" denotes a recording that did not chart or was not released in that territory.

=== As featured artist ===
List of singles as featured artist, with selected chart positions and certifications, showing year released and album name
Title	Year	Peak chart positions										Certifications	Album
Title	Year	US	US R&B/HH	US Rap	AUS	GER	IRE	NL	NZ	SWI	UK	Certifications	Album
"Can I Get A..." (Jay-Z featuring Ja Rule and Amil)	1998	19	6	22	—	12	—	30	—	26	24	RIAA: Gold	Rush Hour (soundtrack) /Vol. 2: Hard Knock Life
"Grand Finale" (DMX featuring Ja Rule, Method Man and Nas)	1998	—^{[B]}	63	18	—	—	—	—	—	—	—		Belly (soundtrack)
"Girlfriend/Boyfriend" (Blackstreet and Janet Jackson featuring Ja Rule and Eve)	1999	47	17	—	16	98	—	41	12	—	11		Finally
"Bad Boy" (Shae Jones featuring Ja Rule)	1999	—	—^{[C]}	—	—	—	—	—	—	—	—		Talk Show
"Damn (Should've Treated U Right)" (So Plush featuring Ja Rule)	1999	—	41	—	—	—	—	—	—	—	—		Blue Streak (soundtrack)
"You Are Everything" (Remix) (Dru Hill featuring Ja Rule)	1999	—	—	—	—	—	—	—	—	—	—		Unleash the Dragon
"Get Da Money" (Erick Sermon featuring Ja Rule)	2000	—	—	48	—	—	—	—	—	—	—		Erick Onasis
"I'm Real" (Murder Remix) (Jennifer Lopez featuring Ja Rule)	2001	1	2	—	3	11	13	2	3	6	4	ARIA: Platinum; RMNZ: Platinum	J.Lo
"Live My Life" (N.O.R.E. featuring Ja Rule)	2002	—	95	—	—	—	—	—	—	—	—		God's Favorite
"Ain't It Funny" (Murder Remix) (Jennifer Lopez featuring Ja Rule and Caddillac Tah)	2002	1	4	—	—	18	—	7	—	7	4	ARIA: Gold	J to tha L–O! The Remixes
"Rainy Dayz" (Mary J. Blige featuring Ja Rule)	2002	12	8	—	—	58	25	13	29	65	17		No More Drama
"What's Luv?" (Fat Joe featuring Ja Rule and Ashanti)	2002	2	3	1	4	10	17	—	5	2	4	ARIA: Gold; BPI: Platinum	Jealous Ones Still Envy (J.O.S.E.)
"Down 4 U" (Irv Gotti featuring Ja Rule, Ashanti, Charli Baltimore and Vita)	2002	6	3	3	—	54	22	22	—	43	4		Irv Gotti Presents: The Inc.
"Too Fine" (Cristian Alexander featuring Ja Rule)	2008	—	—	—	38	—	—	—	—	—	—		Urban Nature
"Fly" (Wanessa featuring Ja Rule)	2009	—	—	—	—	—	—	—	—	—	—		Meu Momento
"Old Thing Back" (Matoma and The Notorious B.I.G. featuring Ja Rule and Ralph Tresvant)	2015	—	—	—	—	—	74	75	25	—	—	BPI: Silver; RMNZ: 3× Platinum	Hakuna Matoma
"Placebo" (Kyle Dion featuring Ja Rule)	2021	—	—	—	—	—	—	—	—	—	—		Sassy
"—" denotes a recording that did not chart or was not released in that territory.

== Other charted songs ==
List of songs, with selected chart positions, showing year released and album name
Title	Year	Peak chart positions	Album
Title	Year	US R&B/HH	Album
"How Many Wanna"	2000	72	Light It Up/Irv Gotti Presents the Murderers
"Never Again"	2001	68	Pain Is Love
"The Crown" (featuring Sizzla)	2003	67	Blood in My Eye

== Guest appearances ==
List of non-single guest appearances, with other performing artists, showing year released and album name
Title	Year	Other artist(s)	Album
"Get Tha Fortune"	1994	Cash Money Click	none
"Time to Build"	1995	Mic Geronimo, Jay-Z, DMX	The Natural
"Usual Suspects"	1997	Mic Geronimo, The Lox, DMX, Tragedy Khadafi	How to Be a Player (soundtrack) /Vendetta
"Murdergram"	1998	DMX, Jay-Z	Streets Is Watching (soundtrack)
"Bitches Betta Have My Money!!"	1998	—N/a	Rush Hour (soundtrack)
"Story to Tell"	1998	—N/a	Belly (soundtrack)/Venni Viti Vici
"Gangsta Shit"	1998	DJ Clue, Jay-Z	The Professional
"25 to Life"	1999	Xzibit, Juvenile, Nature & Reptile	Life (soundtrack)
"Represent"	1999	none	Black Gangster (soundtrack)
"WherDaPaperAt"	1999	Cha Cha	Dear Diary
"4 Seasons"	1999	Method Man, Redman, LL Cool J	Blackout!
"The Girl Is Mine"	1999	Jagged Edge, Jermaine Dupri	J.E. Heartbreak
"First Degree"	1999	Da Franchise	Violator: The Album
"We Murderas Baby"	1999	Vita	Next Friday (soundtrack) / Irv Gotti Presents: The Murderers
"Murderers, Pimps & Thugs"	2000	Do or Die	Victory
"Back Up"	2000	Da Brat, Tamara Savage	Unrestricted
"How Can I Be Down"	2000	TQ	The Second Coming
"Crime Life"	2000	Memphis Bleek, Lil Cease	Backstage: Music Inspired by the Film
"Back Where I Belong"	2000	LL Cool J	G.O.A.T.
"Murda Murda"	2000	Cuban Link	24K
"Feelin' the Hate"	2000	Funkmaster Flex, Murderahs	60 Minutes of Funk
"State to State"	2001	Black Child	Exit Wounds (soundtrack)
"Bing Monsters"	2001	Tragedy Khadafi, Napoleon	Against All Odds
"X"	2001	Missy Elliott, Tweet	Violator: The Album, V2.0/Pain Is Love
"Race Against Time Part 2"	2001	Tank	The Fast And The Furious (soundtrack)
Furious	2001	Vita, 01	The Fast And The Furious (soundtrack)
"Life Ain't a Game"	2001	Damizza	The Fast And The Furious (soundtrack)
"Ride for This"	2001	Fabolous	Ghetto Fabolous
"If We"	2001	Mariah Carey, Nate Dogg	Glitter (soundtrack)
"Get Away"	2002	Christina Milian	Christina Milian
"Twisted"	2002	Jerzee Monét	Love & War
"Leaving (Always on Time Part II)"	2002	Ashanti	Ashanti
"Gangstafied"	2002	The Murderers	Irv Gotti Presents: The Inc.
"The Rain"	2002	The Murderers	Irv Gotti Presents: The Inc.
"We Did It Again"	2002	Metallica, Swizz Beatz	Presents G.H.E.T.T.O. Stories
'Come-n-Go"	2002	Ashanti, Vita, Cadillac Tah	Irv Gotti Presents: The Remixes
"We Fly"	2003	DJ Envy, Lil Mo, Vita	The Desert Storm Mixtape: Blok Party, Vol. 1
"Fly High (Rebellious Remix)"	2003	Mic Geronimo	Long Road Back
"Been Around the World"	2003	R. Kelly	Chocolate Factory
"Sweet Baby"	2003	Ashanti	Chapter II
Rain on Me (Remix)	2003	Ashanti, Charli Balt, Hussein Fatal	Non-album single
"ATL Tales / Ride Wit Me"	2004	Lloyd	Southside
"Turn It Up"	2004	Ashanti	Concrete Rose
"U Already Know" (Murder Inc Remix)	2004	112 & Harry O	none
"Rakata" (Remix)	2005	Wisin & Yandel	Pa'l Mundo
"Only U" (Remix)	2005	Ashanti, Black Child, Merce, Caddillac Tah	Collectables by Ashanti
"One Blood" (East Coast Remix)	2006	The Game, Jim Jones, Fabolous, Clipse, Juelz Santana, Nas, Jadakiss, Styles P, Fat Joe, N.O.R.E.	none
"Cuchi"	2006	N.O.R.E., Big Mato	N.O.R.E. Y La Familia... Ya Tu' Sabe
"Gameface"	2007	Benzino, Lil Dev	Antidote
"New York Is Back"	2007	DJ Khaled, Jadakiss, Fat Joe	We the Best
"Get It Shawty" (Remix)	2007	Lloyd, Lil Wayne, Big Boi, Chamillionaire, Jim Jones, Big Boi	none
"Where I From"	2008	Trae, Lloyd	Against Everything
"Still Murder"	2008	Newz, Young Life	Still Murder
"Boy Looka Here" (Remix)	2008	Rich Boy, Harry O	none
"Who Wants to Fuck Tonight?"	2009	Crooked I, Ray J, Eastwood	none
"Mafia Music" (Remix)	2009	Rick Ross, The Game, Fat Joe	none
"Meu Momento"	2009	Wanessa Camargo	Meu Momento
"Jump Off"	2010	Game	none
"Stay Flawless"	2010	N.O.R.E., DMX, Yummy Bingham	none
"I'm Here"	2010	Mariya	none
"She Tried" (Remix)	2013	N.O.R.E., Lil Wayne, Birdman	none
"Helpless"	2016	Ashanti	The Hamilton Mixtape
"Bad Bitch"	2024	Ghostface Killah	Set the Tone (Guns & Roses)
"Let's Go 5"	2024	MC IG, MC Luki, MC Ryan SP, MC PH, MC Marks, MC Poze do Rodo, TrapLaudo, MC Tuto, MC Luuky, MC Don Juan, MC GP, MC Kadu	none

== Featured Videos ==
Song	Artist	Year	Director
Grand Finale	DMX, Nas, Method Man	1998	Hype Williams
Can I Get A...	Jay-Z, Amil	1998	Steve Carr
Bad Boy	Shae Jones	1999	
Damn (Shoulda)	So Plush	1999	
You Are Everything	Dru Hill	1999	Martin Weisz
We Don't Give a Fuck	The Murderers	2000	Hype Williams
Goodlife (Remix)	Funkmaster Flex, Faith Evans, Murderers!	2001	Marcus Raboy
I'm Real	Jennifer Lopez	2001	Dave Meyers
Rainy Dayz	Mary J Blige	2001	David Palmer
Get Away	Christina Milian	2002	Little X
What's Luv	Fat Joe, Ashanti	2002	Billie Woodruff
Live My Life	N.O.R.E.	2002	
Happy (Remix)	Ashanti	2002	
Aint It Funny (Remix)	Jennifer Lopez, Cadillac Tah	2002	Cris Judd
Down 4 U	The Murderers	2002	Irv Gotti

== Main Performance Videos ==
Song	Artists	Year	Director
How Many Wanna	—N/a	1999	Hype Williams
Holla Holla	—N/a	1999	Hype Williams
Murda 4 Life	Memphis Bleek	1999	Hype Williams
Daddy's Little Angel	Ronald Isley	1999	Hype Williams
Kill em All	—N/a	1999	Hype Williams
Holla Holla (Remix)	The Murderers, Memphis Bleek, Jay-Z Busta Rhymes	2000	Hype Williams
Between Me and You (Letterboxed Version)	Christina Milian	2000	Dave Meyers
Put It on Me	Lil Mo, Vita	2000	Hype Williams
6 Feet	—N/a	2000	
Livin It Up	Case	2001	Dave Meyers
Always on Time	Ashanti	2001	Dave Meyers
Furious	Vita, Cadillac Tah	2001	
Down Ass Chick	Charlie Baltimore	2002	Irv Gotti
Thug Lovin	Bobby Brown	2002	Irv Gotti
Mesmerize	Ashanti	2002	Irv Gotti
The Pledge (Remix)	Ashanti, Nas	2002	Irv Gotti
Murder Reigns	—N/a	2003	Irv Gotti
Clap Back	—N/a	2003	Benny Boom
Wonderful	R. Kelly	2004	Hype Williams
New York	Jadakiss, Fat Joe	2004	R. Malcolm Jones
Caught Up	Lloyd	2004	Erik White

== Notes ==
- A "Reign", originally released on The Last Temptation as "Murder Reigns" and also known as "The Reign", did not enter the Hot R&B/Hip-Hop Songs chart, but peaked at number 2 on the Bubbling Under R&B/Hip-Hop Singles chart, which acts as a 25-song extension to the Hot R&B/Hip-Hop Songs chart.
- B "The Grand Finale" did not enter the Billboard Hot 100, but peaked at number 17 on the Bubbling Under Hot 100 Singles chart, which acts as a 25-song extension to the Hot 100.
- C "Bad Boy" did not enter the Hot R&B/Hip-Hop Songs chart, but peaked at number 1 on the Bubbling Under R&B/Hip-Hop Singles chart, which acts as a 25-song extension to the Hot R&B/Hip-Hop Songs chart.
- D "Streets Raised Me" did not enter the Hot R&B/Hip-Hop Songs chart, but peaked at number 1 on the Bubbling Under R&B/Hip-Hop Singles chart, which acts as a 25-song extension to the Hot R&B/Hip-Hop Songs chart.
