= Icon (Ja Rule album) =

Greatest hits album by Ja Rule
- Released: January 10, 2012
- Genre: Hip hop
- Label: Motown

Ja Rule chronology
| The Mirror (2009) | Icon (2012) | Pain Is Love 2 (2012) |

Professional ratings
Review scores
| Source | Rating |
|---|---|
| Allmusic | 4/5 stars |

Icon is the second greatest hits compilation album by American rapper Ja Rule, released on January 10, 2012 through Motown Records.

== Track listing ==
| No. | Title | Writer(s) | Producer(s) | Length |
|---|---|---|---|---|
| 1. | "Livin' It Up" (featuring Case) | Jeffrey Atkins; Irving Lorenzo; Robert Mays; Stevie Wonder | Irv Gotti; Lil' Rob | 4:18 |
| 2. | "Put It on Me" (featuring Lil' Mo and Vita) | Atkins; Taheem Crocker; Lorenzo; Cynthia Loving; Paul Walcott | Tru Stylze; Irv Gotti | 4:24 |
| 3. | "Wonderful" (featuring Ashanti and R. Kelly) | Atkins; Lorenzo; Robert Kelly; Kendred Smith | Jimi Kendrix; Irv Gotti | 4:32 |
| 4. | "Mesmerize" (featuring Ashanti) | Atkins; Ashanti Douglas; Lorenzo; Andre Parker; Thom Bell; Linda Creed | Chink Santana; Irv Gotti | 4:43 |
| 5. | "Holla Holla" | Atkins; Taiwan Green; Lorenzo | Tai; Irv Gotti | 4:27 |
| 6. | "New York" (featuring Fat Joe and Jadakiss) | Atkins; Joseph Cartagena; Lorenzo; Andre Lyon; Lawrence Parker; Jason Phillips; Marcello Valenzano | Cool & Dre; Irv Gotti (co.) | 4:20 |
| 7. | "We Here Now" (featuring Black Child) | Atkins; Lorenzo; Mays; Ramel Gill | Irv Gotti; Lil' Rob | 3:28 |
| 8. | "Down Ass Bitch" (featuring Charli Baltimore) | Atkins; Tiffany Lane; Lorenzo; Marcus Vest | Irv Gotti | 5:34 |
| 9. | "Between Me and You" (featuring Christina Milian) | Atkins; Lorenzo; Mays | Lil' Rob; Irv Gotti | 4:12 |
| 10. | "Thug Lovin'" (featuring Bobby Brown) | Atkins; Lorenzo; Parker; Wonder | Chink Santana; Irv Gotti | 4:58 |
| 11. | "Always on Time" (featuring Ashanti) | Atkins; Lorenzo; Vest | Irv Gotti | 4:08 |

Sample credits

- "Livin' It Up" contains excerpts from "Do I Do", written by Stevie Wonder.
- "Mesmerize" contains interpolations from "Stop, Look, Listen", written by Thom Bell and Linda Creed.
- "New York" contains interpolations from "100 Guns" written by Lawrence Parker.
- "Thug Lovin'" contains interpolations from "Knocks Me Off My Feet" written by Stevie Wonder.
