= List of The Inc. Records artists =

This is a list of artists signed to The Inc. Records or any of its sub-labels through contracts or joint ventures, close collaborations, and being produced by an Inc. artist or producer. An asterisk (*) denotes an artist who no longer records for the label.

== A ==
- Alexi
- Ashanti

== B ==
- Boxie (Channel 7/The Inc.)
- Charli Baltimore

== C ==
- Bettie Cage
- Caddillac Tah (Pov City/The Inc.)
- Vanessa Carlton
- Channel 7 (Channel 7/The Inc.)*
- Chris Black (Mpire/The Inc.)

== D ==
- D. Gift
- DO Cannon

== F ==
- Free

== G ==
- Irv Gotti (CEO)
- Chris Gotti
- James Gotti

== J ==
- Ja Rule
- Ashley Joi (Channel 7/The Inc.)

== K ==
- Kaisuan
- Kayoz Santana
- Jimi Kendrix

== L ==
- Lloyd (Shonuff/The Inc.)

== M ==
- Young Merc
- Mophi & Mofyne Records
- Mossburg

== N ==
- Newz (Block Gang/Murder Inc.)
- Asia Nitollano

== O ==
- O-1
- Harry O (Mpire/The Inc.)

== R ==
- Ronnie Bumps
- Range

== S ==
- Chink Santana (Byrdgang/Murder Inc.)
- Sekou 720
- Shadow
- Arizona Slim
- Slim (OneTwelve/The Inc.)
- Sponge

== T ==
- T-Dot Raines
- The Murderers
- Thunderkatz

== V ==
- Vita

== See also ==
- Irv Gotti
- Ja Rule
- The Inc. Records
