= Funkmaster Flex discography =

DJ Funkmaster Flex discography
- Compilation albums: 6
- Singles: 12

The discography of DJ Funkmaster Flex consists of six albums and twelve singles.

== Albums ==
List of albums, with selected chart positions and certifications
Title	Album details	Peak chart positions		Certifications
Title	Album details	US	US R&B	Certifications
The Mix Tape	Released: November 21, 1995; Label: Loud; Format: CD, cassette, digital download	108	15	
The Mix Tape II	Released: February 11, 1997; Label: Loud; Format: CD, cassette, digital download	19	2	RIAA: Gold
The Mix Tape III	Released: August 11, 1998; Label: Loud; Format: CD, cassette, digital download	4	2	RIAA: Gold
The Tunnel	Released: December 7, 1999; Label: Def Jam; Format: CD, cassette, digital download	35	3	RIAA: Gold
The Mix Tape IV	Released: December 5, 2000; Label: Loud; Format: CD, cassette, digital download	26	5	RIAA: Gold
Car Show Tour	Released: December 6, 2005; Label: Koch; Format: CD, digital download	—	41	
"—" denotes a recording that did not chart.

== Singles ==
List of singles, with selected chart positions, showing year released and album name
Title	Year	Peak chart positions			Album
Title	Year	US	US R&B	US Rap	Album
"Nuttin' But Flavour" (with The Ghetto Celebs)	1995	101	85	20	Non-album singles
"Safe Sex, No Freaks" (with The Ghetto Celebs)	1995	—	—	50	Non-album singles
"Relax & Party" (featuring Ivory)	1997	—	45	—	The Mix Tape II
"Here We Go" (featuring Khadejia and The Product G&B)	1998	72	34	50	The Mix Tape III
"Wu-Tang Cream Team Line-Up" (featuring Wu-Tang Clan, Harlem Hoodz and Killa Sin)	1998	—	85	32	The Mix Tape III
"We in Here" (featuring Ruff Ryders)	1999	—	83	20	The Tunnel
"Ill Bomb" (featuring LL Cool J)	2000	—	56	19	The Tunnel
"Confrontation" (featuring Mary J. Blige)	2000	—	81	—	The Tunnel
"Do You" (featuring DMX)	2000	91	34	21	The Mix Tape IV
"Goodlife" (featuring Faith Evans, Ja Rule and Caddillac Tah)	2001	—	42	34	The Mix Tape IV
"My Lifestyle" (featuring Fat Joe, Jadakiss and Remy Ma)	2002	—	94	22	Non-album single
"Lurkin" (with King Von)	2020	—	—	—	TBA
"—" denotes a recording that did not chart.

== Other charted songs ==
List of songs, with selected chart positions, showing year released and album name
Title	Year	Peak chart positions	Album
Title	Year	US R&B	Album
"Just a Touch" (featuring 50 Cent and Paul Wall)	2005	72	Car Show Tour
