= Irv Gotti Presents: The Murderers =

Irv Gotti Presents... The Murderers

Compilation album by The Murderers
- Released: March 21, 2000
- Recorded: 1999–2000
- Studio: Quad Recording Studios, New York City; Battery Studios, New York City; The Hit Factory, New York City; Sound On Sound, New York City; Enterprise Studios, Los Angeles; Westlake Audio, Los Angeles; Right Track Studios, New York City; Electric Lady Studios, New York City
- Genre: East Coast hip hop; gangsta rap
- Length: 79:29
- Label: Murder Inc.; Def Jam
- Producer: Irv Gotti (also exec.); Damizza; Dat Nigga Reb; DL; JB Money; Lil' Rob; Mr. Fingaz; Ty Fyffe

The Murderers chronology
Irv Gotti Presents... The Murderers (2000)	Irv Gotti Presents: The Inc. (2002)

Singles from Irv Gotti Presents... The Murderers
- 1. "Vita, Vita, Vita" Released: February 29, 2000

Professional ratings
Review scores
Source	Rating
AllMusic	3/5 stars
NME	7/10
The Source	3/5 stars

Irv Gotti Presents... The Murderers is a compilation album by American record producer Irv Gotti and hip hop group The Murderers. Originally scheduled for a January 25, 2000 release, it was released on March 21, 2000, by Murder Inc. Records and Def Jam Recordings. Recording sessions took place at Quad Studios, at Battery Studios, at The Hit Factory, at Sound On Sound, at Right Track Studios, and at Electric Lady Studios in New York, and at Enterprise Studios, and at Westlake Audio in Los Angeles. Production was primarily handled by Irv Gotti, as well as Lil' Rob, Dat Nigga Reb, Mr. Fingaz, Damizza, DL, JB Money and Ty Fyffe. Beside Ja Rule, Black Child, Tah Murdah, Vita, O-1 and Chris Black, it features contributions by the rest of Murder Inc. roster, such as Ronnie Bumps, and Murder Inc., as well as guest appearances from Dave Bing, Shade Sheist, Busta Rhymes, Lil' Mo and Memphis Bleek.

The album peaked at number 15 on the Billboard 200 and number 2 on the Top R&B/Hip-Hop Albums in the United States and at number 74 in Germany. The album sold 80,000 copies in its first week. The album has sold 360,000 units.

== Track listing ==
No.	Title	Writer(s)	Producer(s)	Length
1.	"Intro"	Irving Lorenzo; Robert Mays	Lil' Rob; Irv Gotti	2:10
2.	"Murderers" (featuring Ja Rule, Black Child and Tah Murdah)	Jeffrey Atkins; Ramel Gill; Tiheem Crocker; Tyrone Fyffe; Lorenzo; Mark Myrie; Clement Dodd	Ty Fyffe; Irv Gotti	4:05
3.	"Dem Niggaz" (featuring Ja Rule, Black Child, Tah Murdah and Vita)	Atkins; Gill; Crocker; LaVita Raynor; Lorenzo; Yvshonne Gadson	J.B. Money; Irv Gotti	2:31
4.	"We Don't Give a Fuck" (featuring Ja Rule, Black Child, Tah Murdah and Vita)	Atkins; Gill; Crocker; Mays; Lorenzo; Ayn Robbins; William Conti; Carol Connors	Lil' Rob; Irv Gotti	3:47
5.	"Clowns" (Skit)			0:49
6.	"Shit Gets Ugly" (featuring Ja Rule, Black Child, Tah Murdah and Vita)	Atkins; Gill; Crocker; Raynor; Mays; Lorenzo	Lil' Rob; Irv Gotti	3:50
7.	"We Murderers Baby" (featuring Ja Rule and Vita)	Atkins; Raynor; Richard Wilson; Lorenzo; Barry White	Dat Nigga Reb; Irv Gotti	3:35
8.	"Interview With Vita" (Skit)			0:57
9.	"Vita, Vita, Vita" (featuring Vita)	Raynor; Taiwan Green; Lorenzo; Crocker	Mr. Fingaz; Irv Gotti	4:14
10.	"How Many Wanna Die" (featuring Ja Rule)	Atkins; Wilson; Lorenzo; Mays	Dat Nigga Reb; Irv Gotti; Lil' Rob (co.)	4:29
11.	"Fuck Parole" (Skit)			0:43
12.	"We Getting High Tonight" (featuring Black Child)	Gill; Wilson; Lorenzo; Green; Edward Levert; Robert Dukes	Dat Nigga Reb; Irv Gotti	5:04
13.	"Tales from the Darkside" (featuring DMX)	Earl Simmons; Mays; Lorenzo; John Carpenter	Lil' Rob; Irv Gotti	3:18
14.	"I Love the Yankees" (Skit)			2:12
15.	"Get It Right" (featuring Tah Murdah)	Crocker; Mays; Lorenzo; Michel Colombier	Lil' Rob; Irv Gotti	4:15
16.	"We Different" (featuring Tah Murdah, Black Child and Ja Rule)	Crocker; Gill; Atkins; Mays; Lorenzo	Lil' Rob; Irv Gotti	4:17
17.	"Remo" (Skit)			1:09
18.	"Rebels Symphony" (featuring Ja Rule, Vita, Tah Murdah, O-1, BJ and Black Child)	Atkins; Raynor; Crocker; Otha Miller; Gill; Wilson; Lorenzo; Charlie Smalls	Dat Nigga Reb; Irv Gotti	3:45
19.	"Black or White" (featuring Black Child)	Gill; Larry Ogletree; Lorenzo	DL; Irv Gotti	3:29
20.	"The 187 Murda Baptist Church Picnic" (Skit)			2:12
21.	"If You Were My Bitch" (featuring Tah Murdah, Ja Rule, Black Child and Shade Sheist)	Crocker; Atkins; Gill; Tramayne Thompson; Damion Young; Howard B. Hersh	Damizza	4:29
22.	"96R-0709" (featuring Chris Black)	Christopher Bristole		2:01
23.	"Crime Scene" (featuring Dave Bing, Black Child, Ronnie Bumps, Tah Murdah and O-1)	Dave Parks; Gill; Ronnie Lane; Crocker; Miller; Wilson; Lorenzo; Calvin Broadus; Delmar Arnaud; Ricardo Brown	Dat Nigga Reb; Irv Gotti	4:20
24.	"Somebody's Gonna Die Tonight" (featuring Dave Bing and Lil' Mo)	Parks; Cynthia Loving; Mays; Lorenzo	Lil' Rob; Irv Gotti	4:37
25.	"Holla Holla (Remix)" (featuring Ja Rule, Jay-Z, Vita, Black Child, Tah Murdah, Memphis Bleek and Busta Rhymes)	Atkins; Green; Lorenzo	Mr. Fingaz; Irv Gotti	3:12
Total length:				1:19:29

Sample credits

- Track 2 contains elements from "Murderer" written by Mark Myrie & Clement Dodd and performed by Buju Banton
- Track 4 contains interpolations from "Gonna Fly Now (Theme From Rocky)" written by Carol Connors, William Conti & Ayn Robbins
- Track 7 contains excerpts from "Somebody's Gonna Off the Man" written by Barry White and performed by The Love Unlimited Orchestra
- Track 12 contains excerpts from "Help Somebody Please" written by Robert Dukes & Eddie Levert and performed by The O'Jays
- Track 13 contains excerpts from "Doctor and Sheriff in the Myer's House" written and performed by John Carpenter
- Track 18 features samples from "The Feeling We Once Had" written by Charlie Smalls
- Track 23 contains excerpts from "Niggas Don't Give a Fuck" written by Calvin Broadus, Delmar Arnaud & Ricardo Brown and performed by Tha Dogg Pound

== Personnel ==
- Irving "Irv Gotti" Lorenzo – mixing (tracks: 2–4, 6–7, 9, 15–16, 18–19, 21, 23–25), producer (tracks: 1–4, 6–7, 9–10, 12–13, 15–16, 18–19, 23–25), re-mixing (track 25), executive producer

The Murderers

- Jeffrey "Ja Rule" Atkins – vocals (tracks: 2–4, 6–7, 10, 16, 18, 21, 25)
- Ramel "Black Child" Gill – vocals (tracks: 2–4, 6, 12, 16, 18–19, 21, 23, 25)
- Tiheem "Caddillac Tah" Crocker – vocals (tracks: 2–4, 6, 15–16, 18, 21, 23, 25)
- LaVita "Vita" Raynor – vocals (tracks: 3, 6–9, 18, 25)
- Otha "O-1" Miller – vocals (tracks: 18, 23)
- Christopher "Jody Mack" Bristole – vocals (track 22)

Guest musicians

- Earl "DMX" Simmons – vocals (track 13)
- BJ – vocals (track 18)
- Tramayne "Shade Sheist" Thompson – vocals (track 21)
- Ronnie "Ronnie Bumps" Lane – vocals (track 23)
- Dave "Dave Bing" Parks – vocals (tracks: 23–24)
- Cynthia "Lil' Mo" Loving – vocals (track 24)
- Trevor "Busta Rhymes" Smith – vocals (track 25)
- Shawn "Jay-Z" Carter – vocals (track 25)
- Malik "Memphis Bleek" Cox – vocals (track 25)
- Taiwan "Mr. Fingaz" Green – organ (track 12), producer (tracks: 9, 25)
- Steve Hunter – guitar (track 21)
- Carl "Butch" Small – percussion (track 21)

Techncals

- Tyrone "Ty" Fyffe – producer (track 2)
- Joe Bythewood – producer (track 3)
- Robert "Lil Rob" Mays – producer (tracks: 1, 4, 6, 13, 15, 16, 24), co-producer (track 10), additional programming (tracks: 12, 23)
- Richard "Dat Nigga Reb" Wilson – producer (tracks: 7, 10, 12, 18, 23)
- Larry "DL" Ogletree – producer (track 19)
- Damian "Damizza" Young – producer (track 21)
- Ken "Supa Engineer DURO" Ifill – mixing (tracks: 2, 4, 7, 10, 12, 13, 15, 16, 18, 19, 23, 25), re-mixing (track 25)
- Brian Springer – mixing (tracks: 3, 6, 9)
- Michael Schlesinger – mixing (track 21)
- Patrick Viala – mixing (track 24), recording (tracks: 2, 3, 9, 10, 15, 16, 18, 23–25)
- Carlisle Young – recording (tracks: 6, 7, 19)
- Rich Keller – recording (track 13)
- Vachik Aghaniantz – recording (track 21)
- Brandon "B-Dawg" Rivera – midi editing (track 21)
- Tom Coyne – mastering
- Markus Swaby – project coordinator
- Jason Noto – art direction
- Scott Sandler – design
- Jonathan Mannion – photography
- Darcell Lawrence – A&R
- Susan Sneider – management
- Deidre L. Graham – marketing
- Davis, Shapiro & Lewit – legal

== Charts ==
Chart (2000)	Peak position
German Albums (Offizielle Top 100)	74
UK R&B Albums (OCC)	19
US Billboard 200	15
US Top R&B/Hip-Hop Albums (Billboard)	2
