= Back in the Day (2005 film) =

2005 film

- Directed by: James Hunter
- Written by: James Hunter; Michael Raffanello
- Produced by: Kip Konwiser, Stephen Baldwin, Donald A. Barton, Van Burrows
- Starring: Ja Rule; Ving Rhames
- Cinematography: Donald M. Morgan
- Edited by: Chris Holmes
- Music by: Robert Folk
- Distributed by: First Look Home Entertainment
- Release date: May 13, 2005
- Running time: 103 minutes
- Country: United States
- Language: English

Back in the Day is a 2005 crime drama starring Ja Rule and Ving Rhames and directed by James Hunter. The film premiered on BET on May 13, 2005.

== Plot ==
Reggie Cooper is a young man who lives with his father in order to avoid the violent gang activity that almost claimed his life when he was a teenager. However, when his recently paroled mentor, J-Bone reconnects with Reggie, and when his father is murdered, Reggie slips back into a life of crime. Reggie murders a local preacher, whose daughter later develops a relationship with him.

== Cast ==
- Ja Rule as Reggie Cooper
- Ving Rhames as Joseph "J-Bone" Brown
- Tatyana Ali as Alicia Packer
- Giancarlo Esposito as Benson Cooper
- Joe Morton as Reverend James Packer
- Pam Grier as Mrs. Cooper
- Frank Langella as Lieutenant Bill Hudson
- Lahmard Tate as Jamal
- Tia Carrere as "Loot"
- Al Sapienza as Detective Kline
- Davetta Sherwood as Tasha
- Kaly Cordova as Police Officer

== Production and reception ==
In early 2003 Ja Rule announced that he was to act in a film alongside Ving Rhames. Filming was slated to take place in Puerto Rico during September of the same year. The film was written by James Hunter and Michael Raffanello, directed by Hunter, and scored by composer Robert Folk. The film was primarily produced by DEJ Productions, at the time its most expensive to date, with budget estimates of $5 to $10 million to over $10 million. Filming ended in 2004, and by April DEJ was preparing a potential theatrical release. Back in the Day premiered on BET on May 13, 2005, and was released to DVD on May 24.

Reviewer Ed Huls called it conceptually similar to several other urban crime dramas, but noted the cast and production values made it a high-end release in the genre, and compared it to classic gangster films: "one could easily picture Cagney or Bogart in the Rhames role.

David Kronke of the Los Angeles Daily News wrote: "No original gangstas in this movie, but plenty of unoriginal ones... How did such a ridiculous script lure so many talented actors?"

== See also ==
- List of hood films
