= Livin' It Up (Ja Rule song) =

2001 single by Ja Rule and Case

Single by Ja Rule featuring Case

from the album Pain Is Love
- Released: September 10, 2001
- Studio: The Crackhouse (New York City)
- Length: 4:20
- Label: Def Jam; Murder Inc.
- Songwriters: Jeffrey Atkins; Robert Mays; Irving Lorenzo; Stevie Wonder
- Producers: Lil' Rob; Irv Gotti

Ja Rule singles chronology
| "I'm Real" (Murder Remix) (2001) | "Livin' It Up" (2001) | "Always on Time" (2001) |

"Livin' It Up" is a song by American rapper Ja Rule featuring singer Case. It was officially serviced to US urban radio on September 10, 2001, as the lead single from Ja Rule's third studio album, Pain Is Love (2001), following several weeks of early airplay. The song, produced by Lil' Rob and Irv Gotti, samples Stevie Wonder's 1982 song "Do I Do".

Issued through Def Jam Recordings and Irv Gotti's Murder Inc. Records, "Livin' It Up" peaked at number six on both the US Billboard Hot 100 and Australian Singles Chart. In 2002, "Livin' It Up" was re-issued in the United Kingdom and reached a new peak of number five on the UK Singles Chart, after initially reaching number 27 in late 2001. NBA All-Star Baron Davis, actor Pauly Shore, and pornographic actress Sunny Leone make appearances in the video.

== Track listings ==
UK CD single (2001)

1. "Livin' It Up" (LP version) – 4:20
2. "Livin' It Up" (instrumental) – 4:20
3. "Put It on Me" (remix featuring Vita and Lil' Mo) – 4:22
4. "Livin' It Up" (video)

UK CD single (2002)

1. "Livin' It Up" (album version) – 4:20
2. "Livin' It Up" (live at the London Astoria) – 4:51
3. "Always on Time" (Agent X mix featuring Ashanti) – 5:10
4. "Livin' It Up" (video) – 4:30

French CD single

1. "Livin' It Up" (radio edit) – 4:18
2. "Livin' It Up" (video)

European maxi-CD and Australasian CD single

1. "Livin' It Up" (radio edit) – 4:18
2. "Livin' It Up" (instrumental) – 4:19
3. "I Cry" (featuring Lil' Mo) – 5:18
4. "Livin' It Up" (video)

== Credits and personnel ==
Credits are taken from the Pain Is Love album booklet.

Studios

- Recorded at The Crackhouse (New York City)
- Mixed at Enterprise Studios (Burbank, California)
- Mastered at Bernie Grundman Mastering (Hollywood, California)

Personnel

- Ja Rule – writing (as Jeffrey Atkins)
- Robert Mays – writing
- Irv Gotti – writing (as Irving Lorenzo), production, mixing
- Stevie Wonder – writing ("Do I Do")
- Case – featured vocals
- 7 – all instruments
- Lil' Rob – production
- Milwaukee Buck – recording
- Supa Engineer DURO – mixing
- Brian Gardner – mastering

== Charts ==
=== Weekly charts ===
| Chart (2001–2002) | Peak position |
|---|---|
| Australia (ARIA) | 6 |
| Australian Urban (ARIA) | 2 |
| Europe (Eurochart Hot 100) | 27 |
| France (SNEP) | 32 |
| Ireland (IRMA) | 20 |
| Netherlands (Dutch Top 40) | 25 |
| Netherlands (Single Top 100) | 29 |
| New Zealand (Recorded Music NZ) | 32 |
| Scotland Singles (OCC) | 18 |
| UK Singles (OCC) | 5 |
| UK Dance (OCC) | 6 |
| UK Hip Hop/R&B (OCC) | 1 |
| US Billboard Hot 100 | 6 |
| US Hot R&B/Hip-Hop Songs (Billboard) | 4 |
| US Hot Rap Songs (Billboard) | 4 |
| US Pop Airplay (Billboard) | 8 |
| US Rhythmic Airplay (Billboard) | 4 |

| Chart (2013) | Peak position |
|---|---|
| UK Hip Hop/R&B (OCC) | 36 |

=== Year-end charts ===
| Chart (2001) | Position |
|---|---|
| UK Urban (Music Week) | 5 |
| US Billboard Hot 100 | 79 |
| US Hot R&B/Hip-Hop Singles & Tracks (Billboard) | 51 |
| US Rhythmic Top 40 (Billboard) | 47 |

| Chart (2002) | Position |
|---|---|
| Australia (ARIA) | 25 |
| Australian Urban (ARIA) | 5 |
| UK Singles (OCC) | 112 |
| UK Airplay (Music Week) | 40 |
| US Billboard Hot 100 | 76 |
| US Mainstream Top 40 (Billboard) | 43 |
| US Rhythmic Top 40 (Billboard) | 64 |

== Certifications ==
| Region | Certification | Certified units/sales |
|---|---|---|
| Australia (ARIA) | Platinum | 70,000^{^} |
| New Zealand (RMNZ) | Platinum | 30,000^{‡} |
| United Kingdom (BPI) | Gold | 400,000^{‡} |
^{^} Shipments figures based on certification alone.^{‡} Sales+streaming figures based on certification alone.

== Release history ==
| Region | Date | Format(s) | Label(s) | Ref. |
|---|---|---|---|---|
| United States | September 10, 2001 | Urban; crossover radio | Murder Inc.; Def Jam | |
| United States | October 16, 2001 | Contemporary hit; rhythmic contemporary radio | Murder Inc.; Def Jam | |
| United Kingdom | October 29, 2001 | 12-inch vinyl; CD; cassette | Murder Inc.; Def Jam | |
| Australia | November 12, 2001 | CD | Murder Inc.; Def Jam | |
| United Kingdom (re-release) | July 22, 2002 | 12-inch vinyl; CD; cassette | Murder Inc.; Def Jam | |
