= Pain Is Love =

Studio album by Ja Rule
- Released: October 2, 2001
- Studios: The Crackhouse (New York City, New York)
- Genres: Hardcore hip-hop; R&B
- Length: 62:07
- Labels: Def Jam; Island Def Jam; Murder Inc.
- Producers: Irv Gotti (also exec.); Lil' Rob; Ty Fyffe

Ja Rule chronology
| Rule 3:36 (2000) | Pain Is Love (2001) | The Last Temptation (2002) |

Singles from Pain Is Love
- 1. "Livin' It Up" Released: September 10, 2001; 2. "Always on Time" Released: November 27, 2001; 3. "Down Ass Bitch" Released: March 19, 2002

Pain Is Love is the third studio album by American rapper Ja Rule, released on October 2, 2001 under The Island Def Jam Music Group, Def Jam Recordings, and Irv Gotti's Murder Inc. Records. The entirety of the album was co-produced by Murder Inc. co-founder and record producer Irv Gotti.

Although the album received a mixed reception from critics, Pain Is Love debuted at number one on the Billboard 200 and was supported by three singles: "Livin' It Up", "Always on Time" and "Down Ass Bitch". It was certified triple-platinum by the Recording Industry Association of America (RIAA) for selling over 3,000,000 copies in the United States. Pain is Love received numerous awards and nominations including a nomination for Best Rap Album at the 44th Grammy Awards. The album's first two singles "Livin' It Up" featuring Case and "Always on Time" featuring Ashanti collected nominations for Best Rap/Sung Collaboration in 2002 and 2003.

== Critical reception ==
Professional ratings
Aggregate scores
| Source | Rating |
|---|---|
| Metacritic | 59/100 |
Review scores
| Source | Rating |
| AllMusic | 4/5 stars |
| Entertainment Weekly | B+ |
| Los Angeles Times | 2.5/4 stars |
| Pitchfork | 7.0/10 |
| RapReviews | 7.5/10 |
| Rolling Stone | 3/5 stars |
| USA Today | 3/4 stars |

Pain is Love received generally mixed reviews from music critics. At Metacritic, which assigns a normalized rating out of 100 to reviews from mainstream critics, the album received an average score of 59, based on 10 reviews.

AllMusic's Jason Birchmeier praised the album for fine-tuning the formula set by Rule 3:36 of having R&B crossover singles and hardcore rap tracks to balance out the whole record. An editor from HipHopDX said that hardcore tracks like "Dial M for Murder" and "Worldwide Gangsta" felt like forced attempts to bring back Ja's thug persona, but praised the album for having tracks that contain ear-grabbing lines and good beats, saying that "Pain Is Love is another positive establishment that will indeed create more popularity and more fan acknowledgement for Ja Rule." Steve 'Flash' Juon of RapReviews found Ja's singing voice on some tracks intolerable but gave the album credit for containing tracks that display Irv Gotti's producing talents and Ja's adequate lyricism, concluding that, "Ja Rule will live up to the latter half of his name and dominate the charts for the latter half of 2001 with an album that is undoubtedly his most solid release to date."

Soren Baker of the Los Angeles Times gave credit to the singles "Livin' It Up" and "I'm Real" for being the album's strong points but criticized tracks like "The Inc" and "Worldwide Gangsta" for being bland and less effective, saying they "recycle hard-core themes without adding any clever phrasings or creative beat work to compensate for their ordinariness." Nathan Rabin of The A.V. Club criticized the album for lacking substance to go with the catchy pop hooks and Ja for making what they perceive as failed attempts to copy 2Pac, specifically on the penultimate feature track "So Much Pain" concluding that "even at less than his best, 2Pac still conveys a sense of urgency and purpose that illustrates incontestably the huge chasm separating the real deal from a canny imitation."

== Commercial performance ==
Pain Is Love spawned two number one hit singles and managed to debuted at number one on the US Billboard 200 chart, thus giving Ja Rule his second US number-one album in his career and also ending the 3-week reign of fellow Def Jam artist Jay-Z's fifth studio album, The Blueprint, which was released on the same day as the September 11 attacks. With first-week sales of 361,000 copies, Pain is Love was certified three times platinum in the United States, as of June 2002. It also received a Grammy nomination for Best Rap Album in 2002 but lost to OutKast's Stankonia. As of April 21, 2007 Pain Is Love has sold over 4.6 million copies in the U.S. and close to 10 million copies worldwide. This was the fastest selling rap album of 2001.

== Track listing ==
Credits adapted from the album's liner notes.

| No. | Title | Writer(s) | Producer(s) | Length |
|---|---|---|---|---|
| 1. | "Pain Is Love" (skit) | | | 1:18 |
| 2. | "Dial M for Murder" | Jeffrey Atkins; Tyrone Fyffe; Seven Aurelius; Irving Lorenzo; Dennis DeYoung | Irv Gotti; Ty Fyffe^{[a]} | 3:32 |
| 3. | "Livin' It Up" (featuring Case) | Atkins; Robert Mays; Lorenzo; Stevie Wonder | Irv Gotti; Lil' Rob | 4:17 |
| 4. | "The Inc." (featuring Caddillac Tah, Black Child & Ashanti) | Atkins; Aurelius; Lorenzo; Ashanti Douglas; Ramel Gill; Taheem Crocker | Irv Gotti | 3:56 |
| 5. | "Always On Time" (featuring Ashanti) | Atkins; Aurelius; Lorenzo | Irv Gotti | 4:05 |
| 6. | "Down Ass Bitch" (featuring Charli Baltimore) | Atkins; Aurelius; Lorenzo; Tiffany Lane | Irv Gotti | 5:31 |
| 7. | "Never Again" | Atkins; Aurelius; Lorenzo | Irv Gotti | 4:19 |
| 8. | "Worldwide Gangsta" (featuring Caddillac Tah, Black Child, Boo & Gotti) | Atkins; Aurelius; Lorenzo; Crocker; Gill; Mwata Mitchell; Sabrian Sledge | Irv Gotti | 3:20 |
| 9. | "Leo" (skit) | | | 2:18 |
| 10. | "I'm Real (Murder Remix)" (featuring Jennifer Lopez) | Atkins; Aurelius; Lorenzo; Jennifer Lopez; Troy Oliver; Cory Rooney; Leshan Lewis; Rick James | Irv Gotti | 4:12 |
| 11. | "Smokin' and Ridin'" (featuring Jodie Mack & O-1) | Atkins; Aurelius; Lorenzo; Christopher Bristol; Otha Miller | Irv Gotti | 4:51 |
| 12. | "X" (featuring Missy Elliott & Tweet) | Atkins; Melissa Elliott; Charlene Keys; Aurelius; Lorenzo | Irv Gotti | 5:02 |
| 13. | "Big Remo" (skit) | | | 0:19 |
| 14. | "Lost Little Girl" | Atkins; Aurelius; Lorenzo | Irv Gotti | 5:00 |
| 15. | "So Much Pain" (featuring 2Pac) | Atkins; Lorenzo; Dave Grusin; Earl Klugh; Tupac Shakur; Randy Walker | Irv Gotti; Lil' Rob | 5:03 |
| 16. | "Pain Is Love" | Atkins; Aurelius; Lorenzo | Irv Gotti | 5:04 |

Notes

- Some editions of the album add the song "Put It on Me" as track 17.
- ^{^[a]} signifies a co-producer

Sample credits

- "Dial M for Murder" contains interpolations of "Castle Walls", written by Dennis DeYoung and performed by Styx.
- "Livin' It Up" contains excerpts from "Do I Do", written and performed by Stevie Wonder.
- "I'm Real (Murder Remix)" contains an interpolation of "All Night Long" written by Rick James and performed by Mary Jane Girls.
- "So Much Pain" contains excerpts from "Pain", written by Dave Grusin, Earl Klugh, Tupac Shakur, and Randy Walker, and performed by 2Pac featuring Stretch.

== Personnel ==
- A&R [Coordinator] – Hector Aviles
- A&R [Direction] – Chris Gotti
- Art Direction, Design – Kyledidthis
- 7 Aurelius – instrumentation and mixing (2, 4–8, 10–12, 14, 16)
- Milwaukee Buck – engineer (2–8, 10, 11, 14–16)
- Paul Bushnell – bass guitar (4, 6, 7)
- Ashanti Douglas – additional vocals (5)
- Supa Engineer Duro – mixing (3)
- Brian Gardner – mastering
- Irv Gotti – executive producer, mixing (2–8, 10–12, 14–16)
- Darcell Lawrence – production coordinator
- Ja Rule – executive producer
- Glen Marchese – mix engineer (4–7, 15)
- Anthony Mazza – guitar (2, 4, 6, 7, 11)
- Marty Osterer – bass guitar (10)
- Carl "Butch" Smalls – percussion (2, 16)
- Gimi Taylor – bass guitar (2)
- Coordinator [Recording Administration] – Patrick Reynolds
- Engineer [Mix] – Brian Springer (tracks: 2, 8, 10 to 12, 14, 16), Glen Marchese (tracks: 4 to 7, 15)
- Management – Ron Robinson
- Management [Business Affairs] – Jonathan Lieberman
- Management [Consigliere] – John "JB" Branca
- Management [Financial] – Cynthia Brent
- Management [Marketing] – Deidre Graham
- Photography By – Jonathan Mannion
- Producer – Irv Gotti (tracks: 2 to 8, 10 to 12, 14 to 16), Lil' Rob (tracks: 3, 15)
- Recorded By – Brian Springer (tracks: 12), Milwaukee Buck (tracks: 2 to 8, 10, 11, 14 to 16)
- Typography [Ja Rule Logo] – Giantone
- Written-By – S. Aurelius (tracks: 2, 4 to 8, 10 to 12, 14, 16), I. Lorenzo (tracks: 2 to 8, 10 to 12, 14 to 16), J. Atkins (tracks: 2 to 8, 10 to 12, 14 to 16), R. Gill (tracks: 4, 8), T. Crocker (tracks: 4, 8)

== Charts ==
=== Weekly charts ===
Weekly chart performance for Pain Is Love
| Chart (2001–2002) | Peak position |
|---|---|
| Australian Albums (ARIA) | 6 |
| Australian Urban Albums (ARIA) | 1 |
| Belgian Albums (Ultratop Flanders) | 24 |
| Belgian Albums (Ultratop Wallonia) | 24 |
| Canadian Albums (Billboard) | 3 |
| Canadian R&B Albums (Nielsen SoundScan) | 1 |
| Dutch Albums (Album Top 100) | 17 |
| European Top 100 Albums (Music & Media) | 14 |
| French Albums (SNEP) | 34 |
| German Albums (Offizielle Top 100) | 38 |
| Irish Albums (IRMA) | 24 |
| New Zealand Albums (RMNZ) | 1 |
| Scottish Albums (Official Charts) | 24 |
| Swiss Albums (Schweizer Hitparade) | 28 |
| UK Albums (Official Charts) | 3 |
| UK R&B Albums (Official Charts) | 1 |
| US Billboard 200 | 1 |
| US Top R&B/Hip-Hop Albums (Billboard) | 1 |

=== Year-end charts ===
Year-end chart performance for Pain Is Love
| Chart (2001) | Position |
|---|---|
| Canadian Albums (Nielsen SoundScan) | 44 |
| Canadian R&B Albums (Nielsen SoundScan) | 9 |
| Canadian Rap Albums (Nielsen SoundScan) | 4 |
| UK Albums (OCC) | 167 |
| US Billboard 200 | 82 |
| US Top R&B/Hip-Hop Albums (Billboard) | 49 |
| Chart (2002) | Position |
| Australian Albums (ARIA) | 30 |
| Belgian Albums (Ultratop Flanders) | 72 |
| Belgian Albums (Ultratop Wallonia) | 74 |
| Canadian Albums (Nielsen SoundScan) | 26 |
| Canadian R&B Albums (Nielsen SoundScan) | 4 |
| Canadian Rap Albums (Nielsen SoundScan) | 4 |
| Dutch Albums (Album Top 100) | 64 |
| French Albums (SNEP) | 103 |
| UK Albums (OCC) | 40 |
| US Billboard 200 | 20 |
| US Top R&B/Hip-Hop Albums (Billboard) | 6 |

== Certifications ==
Certifications for Pain Is Love
| Region | Certification | Certified units/sales |
|---|---|---|
| Australia (ARIA) | Platinum | 70,000^{^} |
| Canada (Music Canada) | 3× Platinum | 300,000^{^} |
| Netherlands (NVPI) | Gold | 40,000^{^} |
| New Zealand (RMNZ) | Platinum | 15,000^{^} |
| United Kingdom (BPI) | 2× Platinum | 600,000^{‡} |
| United States (RIAA) | 3× Platinum | 3,000,000^{^} |
^{^} Shipments figures based on certification alone.

== See also ==
- List of Billboard 200 number-one albums of 2001
- List of Billboard number-one R&B albums of 2001
- List of number-one albums from the 2000s (New Zealand)
