= Always on Time =

2001 single by Ja Rule

Single by Ja Rule featuring Ashanti

from the album Pain Is Love
- B-side: "I Cry"
- Released: November 27, 2001
- Studio: The Crackhouse (New York City)
- Length: 4:05
- Label: Def Jam; Murder Inc.
- Songwriters: Jeffrey Atkins; 7 Aurelius; Irving Lorenzo
- Producer: Irv Gotti

Ja Rule singles chronology
"Livin' It Up" (2001)	"Always on Time" (2001)	"Ain't It Funny (Murder Remix)" (2002)

Ashanti singles chronology
"Just Like a Thug" (2001)	"Always on Time" (2001)	"What's Luv?" (2002)

Music video
- "Always on Time" on YouTube

"Always on Time" is a song by American rapper Ja Rule from his third studio album, Pain Is Love (2001). Produced by Irv Gotti, the song was written by Ja Rule, 7 Aurelius, and Gotti. Originally set to feature Brandy, it features guest vocals from singer-songwriter and labelmate Ashanti. The song was released as the album's second single on November 27, 2001, through Def Jam Recordings and Gotti's Murder Inc. Records.

"Always on Time" spent two weeks atop the US Billboard Hot 100 chart in February and March 2002, becoming Ja Rule's highest-charting single as a lead artist. It was Ashanti's first Hot 100 number one and Ja Rule's second, after he was featured on Jennifer Lopez's "I'm Real (Murder Remix)". In 2009, "Always on Time" was named the 33rd-most successful song of the 2000s on the Billboard Hot R&B/Hip-Hop Songs chart and the 82nd-most successful song of the 2000s on the Hot 100.

== Background ==
The beat for "Always on Time" was created by producer 7 Aurelius. As Ja Rule explained to Billboard: "7 had this CD and he threw it in the garbage, Gotti. I was like, 'Yo, what the fuck are you doing?' He was like, 'I ain't fuck[ing] with them shits.' I took [that] shit out the garbage and I took it home and wrote three or four records to songs on there. Two of them came to be hits, with one being 'Always On Time' and the other being Mary J. Blige's 'Rainy Dayz.' I had a studio in my crib. We thought about putting other people on it at first, but I was like, 'Baby sis [Ashanti] is here and we could do it with her.' She had [done] one record at that point, which I think was the Big Pun ['How We Roll'] joint, but she didn't have any visibility on the record. That was a good moment."

== Track listings ==
UK CD1

1. "Always on Time" (LP version)
2. "Always on Time" (radio version)
3. "I Cry" (LP version featuring Lil' Mo)
4. "Always on Time" (full length video)

UK CD2 and European CD single

1. "Always on Time" (radio edit)
2. "Always on Time" (explicit album version)

UK cassette single

1. "Always on Time" (radio version)
2. "I Cry" (LP version featuring Lil' Mo)

UK 12-inch single

A1. "Always on Time" (LP version)
B1. "I Cry" (LP version featuring Lil' Mo)
B2. "Always on Time" (radio version)

Australasian CD single

1. "Always on Time" (radio edit)
2. "Always on Time" (explicit album version)
3. "Always on Time" (instrumental)
4. "Always on Time" (video)

== Credits and personnel ==
Credits are taken from the Pain Is Love album booklet.

Studios

- Recorded at The Crackhouse (New York City)
- Mixed at The Hit Factory (New York City)
- Mastered at Bernie Grundman Mastering (Hollywood, California)

Personnel

- Ja Rule – writing (as Jeffrey Atkins)
- 7 Aurelius – writing, all instruments, mixing
- Irv Gotti – writing (as Irving Lorenzo), production, mixing
- Ashanti – featured vocals, additional vocals
- Milwaukee Buck – recording
- Glen Marchese – mix engineering
- Brian Gardner – mastering

== Charts ==
=== Weekly charts ===
Weekly chart performance for "Always on Time"
Chart (2001–2002)	Peak position
Australia (ARIA)	3
Australian Urban (ARIA)	1
Belgium (Ultratop 50 Flanders)	22
Belgium (Ultratop 50 Wallonia)	26
Canada (Nielsen SoundScan)	16
Europe (Eurochart Hot 100)	33
France (SNEP)	45
Germany (GfK)	22
Ireland (IRMA)	22
Italy (FIMI)	29
Netherlands (Dutch Top 40)	12
Netherlands (Single Top 100)	11
New Zealand (Recorded Music NZ)	2
Norway (VG-lista)	17
Scottish Singles Sales (Official Charts)	18
Sweden (Sverigetopplistan)	45
Switzerland (Schweizer Hitparade)	4
UK Singles (Official Charts)	6
UK Hip Hop/R&B (Official Charts)	2
US Billboard Hot 100	1
US Dance Singles Sales (Billboard)	16
US Hot R&B/Hip-Hop Songs (Billboard)	1
US Hot Rap Songs (Billboard)	4
US Pop Airplay (Billboard)	5
US Rhythmic Airplay (Billboard)	1
US Top 40 Tracks (Billboard)	4

=== Year-end charts ===
Year-end chart performance for "Always on Time"
Chart (2002)	Position
Australia (ARIA)	60
Australian Urban (ARIA)	20
Canada (Nielsen SoundScan)	94
Europe (Eurochart Hot 100)	97
Netherlands (Dutch Top 40)	78
Netherlands (Single Top 100)	82
Switzerland (Schweizer Hitparade)	47
UK Singles (OCC)	64
UK Airplay (Music Week)	15
UK Urban (Music Week)	25
US Billboard Hot 100	12
US Hot R&B/Hip-Hop Singles & Tracks (Billboard)	7
US Hot Rap Tracks (Billboard)	2
US Mainstream Top 40 (Billboard)	36
US Rhythmic Top 40 (Billboard)	5

=== Decade-end charts ===
Decade-end chart performance for "Always on Time"
Chart (2000–2009)	Position
US Billboard Hot 100	82
US Hot R&B/Hip-Hop Songs (Billboard)	33

== Certifications ==
Certifications and sales for "Always on Time"
Region	Certification	Certified units/sales
Australia (ARIA)	Gold	35,000^{^}
Brazil (Pro-Música Brasil)	Gold	30,000^{‡}
New Zealand (RMNZ)	3× Platinum	90,000^{‡}
United Kingdom (BPI)	2× Platinum	1,200,000^{‡}
^{^} Shipments figures based on certification alone.^{‡} Sales+streaming figures based on certification alone.

== Release history ==
Release dates and formats for "Always on Time"
Region	Date	Format(s)	Label(s)	Ref.
United States	November 27, 2001	Rhythmic contemporary; urban radio	Murder Inc.; Def Jam	
United Kingdom	January 21, 2002	CD; cassette	Murder Inc.; Def Jam	
United States	January 28, 2002	Contemporary hit radio	Murder Inc.; Def Jam	
Australia	April 1, 2002	CD	Murder Inc.; Def Jam	

== See also ==
- List of Billboard Hot 100 number-one singles of 2002
- List of number-one R&B singles of 2002 (U.S.)
