= Thug Lovin' =

2002 single by Ja Rule

Single by Ja Rule featuring Bobby Brown

from the album The Last Temptation
- B-side: "Connected"
- Released: November 4, 2002
- Genre: Hip-hop; R&B
- Length: 4:54
- Label: Def Jam; Murder Inc.
- Songwriters: Jeffrey Atkins; Andre Parker; Irving Lorenzo; Stevie Wonder
- Producers: Chink Santana; Irv Gotti

Ja Rule singles chronology
"Down Ass Bitch" (2002)	"Thug Lovin'" (2002)	"Mesmerize" (2002)

Bobby Brown singles chronology
"Feelin' Inside" (1997)	"Thug Lovin'" (2002)	"Damaged" (2009)

"Thug Lovin'" is a song by American rapper Ja Rule featuring singer Bobby Brown, released on November 4, 2002, as the first single from Ja Rule's fourth studio album, The Last Temptation (2002). The song was produced by Irv Gotti. Bobby Brown's sung portion is an interpolation of part of the chorus of the Stevie Wonder song "Knocks Me Off My Feet".

The music video for the song, directed by Irv Gotti, features scenes of Ja Rule and Bobby Brown in a helicopter, on a helipad on top of a skyscraper which has the Murder Inc. logo on it, the two artists driving in a Bentley, and the two going to a party. The video premiered on BET's Access Granted in 2002.

== Track listings ==
US 12-inch single

A1. "Thug Lovin'" (radio)
A2. "Thug Lovin'" (street)
B1. "Thug Lovin'" (instrumental)
B2. "Thug Lovin'" (acapella)

Canadian and European CD single

1. "Thug Lovin'" (radio edit)
2. "Connected" (featuring Crooked I and Eastwood)

UK CD single

1. "Thug Lovin'" (radio edit) – 4:31
2. "Thug Lovin'" (album version) – 4:54
3. "Thug Lovin'" (The Pledge remix—album version) – 5:13
4. "Thug Lovin'" (video) – 4:36

UK 12-inch single

A1. "Thug Lovin'" (album version) – 4:54
A2. "Thug Lovin'" (radio edit) – 4:31
B1. "Thug Lovin'" (The Pledge remix—album version) – 5:13

UK cassette single

1. "Thug Lovin'" (album version) – 4:54
2. "Thug Lovin'" (The Pledge remix—album version) – 5:13

Australian CD single

1. "Thug Lovin'" (radio edit)
2. "Between Me and You" (featuring Christina Milian)
3. "Put It on Me" (featuring Vita)
4. "Thug Lovin'" (instrumental)
5. "Thug Lovin'" (acapella)

== Charts ==
=== Weekly charts ===
Weekly chart performance for "Thug Lovin'"
Chart (2002–2003)	Peak position
Australia (ARIA)	7
Australian Urban (ARIA)	5
Belgium (Ultratip Bubbling Under Flanders)	11
Belgium (Ultratip Bubbling Under Wallonia)	5
Canada (Nielsen SoundScan)	10
Europe (Eurochart Hot 100)	26
Germany (GfK)	36
Ireland (IRMA)	26
Netherlands (Dutch Top 40)	36
Netherlands (Single Top 100)	21
New Zealand (Recorded Music NZ)	23
Scotland Singles (Official Charts)	29
Switzerland (Schweizer Hitparade)	89
UK Singles (Official Charts)	15
UK Hip Hop/R&B (Official Charts)	2
US Billboard Hot 100	42
US Hot R&B/Hip-Hop Songs (Billboard)	16
US Hot Rap Songs (Billboard)	10
US Rhythmic Airplay (Billboard)	24

=== Year-end charts ===
2002 year-end chart performance for "Thug Lovin'"
Chart (2002)	Position
Canada (Nielsen SoundScan)	65
UK Urban (Music Week)	40

2003 year-end chart performance for "Thug Lovin'"
Chart (2003)	Position
Australia (ARIA)	47

== Certifications ==
Certificatios and sales for "Thug Lovin'"
Region	Certification	Certified units/sales
Australia (ARIA)	Gold	35,000^{^}
^{^} Shipments figures based on certification alone.

== Release history ==
Release dates and formats for "Thug Lovin'"
Region	Date	Format(s)	Label(s)	Ref.
United States	November 4, 2002	Rhythmic contemporary; urban radio	Murder Inc.; Def Jam	
Australia	December 2, 2002	CD	Murder Inc.	
Belgium	December 4, 2002	CD	Def Jam	
United Kingdom	December 9, 2002	12-inch vinyl; CD; cassette	Murder Inc.; Def Jam	
New Zealand	December 16, 2002	CD	Murder Inc.	
