= Holla Holla =

Single by Ja Rule

from the album Venni Vetti Vecci
- Released: March 2, 1999
- Recorded: 1998
- Genre: Hip hop; East Coast hip hop
- Length: 4:24; 2:55 (remix)
- Label: Murder Inc.; Def Jam
- Songwriter(s): Jeffrey Atkins; Irving Lorenzo; Taiwan Green
- Producer(s): Tai; Irv Gotti

Ja Rule singles chronology
"Grand Finale" (1998)	"Holla Holla" (1999)	"Daddy's Little Baby" (1999)

"Holla Holla" is the first single by the American rapper Ja Rule from his first studio album, Venni Vetti Vecci (1999). It was produced by Taiwan "Tai" Green and Irv Gotti. The music video was shot in Rio de Janeiro, Brazil and was directed by Hype Williams and Irv Gotti.

A remix and the album's third single featured Jay-Z, Vita, Caddillac Tah, Black Child, Memphis Bleek and Busta Rhymes, the latter of which would later feud with Ja Rule.

== Background and composition ==
After Ja Rule finalized the recording of the album, Ja Rule's record label Def Jam, did not consider any song on the album worthy of marketing as a single. Despite his surprise at this, admitting in an interview with Complex magazine that he "didn’t grasp the idea of making a radio record", he resumed recording sessions to compose what became "Holla Holla". It transpired to be the final song recorded for Venni Vetti Vecci. Ja Rule's rapping on "Holla Holla" employs what he described as his "stutter flow", with the repetition of certain words to increase the volume of lyrics.

== Reception ==
Writing for the Los Angeles Times, Soren Baker felt that "Holla Holla" demonstrated Ja Rule's ability to use "his edgy voice and the spectacular instrumentation that backs him".

== Track listing ==
1. "Holla Holla" (Street Version)
2. "Holla Holla" (Instrumental)
3. "BJ Skit"
4. "It's Murda" (Street Version)
5. "It's Murda" (Instrumental)
6. "Kill 'Em All" (Street Version)

== Charts ==
=== Weekly charts ===
Chart (1999)	Peak position
Canada (Nielsen SoundScan)	15
US Billboard Hot 100	35
US Hot R&B/Hip-Hop Songs (Billboard)	11
US Rhythmic (Billboard)	20

=== Year-end charts ===
Chart (1999)	Position
US Hot R&B/Hip-Hop Songs (Billboard)	30

== Credits ==
- Taiwan Green– producer
- Irv Gotti – producer, mixing
- Ken Ifill – mixing
- Ja Rule – vocals, rap
- Patrick Viala – engineer

== In popular culture ==
- The song is played in The Sopranos season 2 episode "Toodle Fucking-Oo" when Tony arrives at the scene of Livia's house where Meadow threw a party.
