= Rainy Dayz =

2002 single by Mary J. Blige

Single by Mary J. Blige featuring Ja Rule

from the album No More Drama
- Released: March 11, 2002
- Length: 4:36
- Label: MCA
- Songwriters: Irving Lorenzo; Jeffrey Atkins
- Producer: Irv Gotti

Mary J. Blige singles chronology
"Dance for Me" (2002)	"Rainy Dayz" (2002)	"Come Close" (2002)

Ja Rule singles chronology
"What's Luv?" (2002)	"Rainy Dayz" (2002)	"Down Ass Bitch" (2002)

"Rainy Dayz" is a song by American singer Mary J. Blige featuring additional vocals from rapper Ja Rule. Taken from Blige's re-release of her fifth studio album, No More Drama, the track was released to coincide with the release of the album's reissue, serving as its final single. The Irv Gotti-produced duet became another hit for both, peaking at number 12 on the US Billboard Hot 100 and number 17 on the UK Singles Chart.

== Background ==
Ja Rule wrote "Rainy Dayz" in response to the September 11 attacks in his home city of New York City. He told Complex, "I went in my basement in my studio and put that record together because that's how I was feeling about the situation. I felt like the nation—us as a country, us as people—we were going through a rainy day. It will pass but today this is what it is. Speaking to TRL, he said, "It’s basically about how we feel going through life. But [in] these times, especially right now [with] what's going on, it kind of fits. On the record, I'm basically saying that it’s these rainy days that we spend a lifetime trying to wash away. Just waiting for the sun to come and shine again. But until then, come smile for me. So that's the kind of vibe that [the song] is on.

The track was originally written for TLC for their fourth studio album 3D, but the group turned the track down. Group member Tionne Watkins commented on this, saying "It wasn't that I didn't like the song, it was more so that I felt like I've already been there, done that, and I was just on another page at the time". References to TLC being the group in mind when the track was written can be heard in the lyrics "We're always livin' so crazy and sexy and cool" (in reference to their album CrazySexyCool) and "Baby didn't they tell you before about chasin' those waterfalls" (in reference to their 1995 single "Waterfalls"). The track also has a reference to the Marvin Gaye song "What's Going On."

== Critical reception ==
BET.com wrote of the song: "Mary more than makes it her own, turning pain into hope in the course of a four-minute song—a major theme of both this song's album and Mary's career arc." Jason MacNeil, writing for PopMatters, noted that "Rainy Dayz" begins "with a horrid pace and structure, but thankfully moves into a much better vibe as some dense layering and keyboards gives it a decent tune."

== Track listings ==
CD and digital single
No.	Title	Writer(s)	Producer(s)	Length
1.	"Rainy Dayz" (radio edit featuring Ja Rule)	Irving Lorenzo; Jeffrey Atkins	Irv Gotti	4:04
2.	"Let No Man Put Asunder" (Maurica Joshua remix)	Bruce Gray; Bruce Hawes	Malik Pendleton; Bryant Crockett; Moise LaPorte; Maurice Joshua^{[a]}	5:21
3.	"Sexy" (featuring Jadakiss)	Mary J. Blige; Jason Phillips; Stevie Wonder; Susaye Greene	Floyd Howard; Kiyamma Griffin	4:44

== Charts ==
=== Weekly charts ===
Weekly chart performance for "Rainy Dayz"
Chart (2002)	Peak position
Belgium (Ultratop 50 Flanders)	44
Belgium (Ultratip Bubbling Under Wallonia)	7
Europe (Eurochart Hot 100)	52
Germany (GfK)	58
Ireland (IRMA)	25
Netherlands (Dutch Top 40)	13
Netherlands (Single Top 100)	13
New Zealand (Recorded Music NZ)	29
Scottish Singles Sales (Official Charts)	29
Sweden (Sverigetopplistan)	55
Switzerland (Schweizer Hitparade)	65
UK Singles (Official Charts)	17
UK Hip Hop/R&B (Official Charts)	1
US Billboard Hot 100	12
US Dance Club Songs (Billboard)	6
US Hot R&B/Hip-Hop Songs (Billboard)	8
US Pop Airplay (Billboard)	22
US Rhythmic Airplay (Billboard)	7

=== Year-end charts ===
Year-end chart performance for "Rainy Dayz"
Chart (2002)	Position
Netherlands (Dutch Top 40)	86
US Billboard Hot 100	67
UK Urban (Music Week)	38
US Hot R&B/Hip-Hop Singles & Tracks (Billboard)	35
US Rhythmic Top 40 (Billboard)	44

== Release history ==
Release history and formats for "Rainy Dayz"
Region	Date	Format(s)	Label(s)	Ref(s).
United States	March 11, 2002	Urban radio	MCA	
United States	May 7, 2002	Contemporary hit radio	MCA	
United Kingdom	August 12, 2002	CD; cassette	MCA	
United Kingdom	August 19, 2002	12-inch vinyl	MCA	
