= Down Ass Bitch =

Single by Ja Rule featuring Charli Baltimore

from the album Pain Is Love
- Released: March 19, 2002
- Studio: The Crackhouse (New York City)
- Genre: Hip-hop; R&B
- Length: 5:31
- Label: Island Def Jam; Def Jam; Murder Inc.
- Songwriters: Jeffrey Atkins; 7 Aurelius; Tiffany Lane; Irving Lorenzo
- Producers: Irv Gotti; 7 Aurelius

Ja Rule singles chronology
"Rainy Dayz" (2002)	"Down Ass Bitch" (2002)	"Thug Lovin'" (2002)

"Down Ass Bitch" (edited as "Down Ass Chick" or "Down A** Chick") is the third and final single by American rapper Ja Rule, from his third studio album Pain Is Love (2001). It features then-labelmate Charli Baltimore and was released through Def Jam Recordings and Irv Gotti's Murder Inc. Records.

== Music video ==
The music video opens with two FBI detectives (played by Eric Roberts and Clarence Williams III) on the hunt for two diamond thieves (Ja Rule and Charli). It then cuts to Ja Rule and Charli ready to steal a diamond in a mansion at night (with Ja Rule rapping outside a car in-between scenes). They successfully found the diamonds hidden in the portrait. The owners, an actual married couple, were awakened by the alarm knowing that the hidden diamonds were stolen. The husband then pressed the alert button, calling the police. Ja Rule was able to escape, while his partner, Charli was arrested by the police. The scene then cuts to Charli's interrogation where the elder detective furiously asks the whereabouts of Ja Rule while another detective reveals the crime scene as well as Charli being the one who pulled the crime with Ja assisting her. He then asks where Ja is, along with the elder detective asking in a more furious manner. Charli replies that she doesn't know what they're talking about. In the next verse, Charli, still in the interrogation room raps in front of the two detectives which then shifts to her in prison. Charli, then makes a phone call to Ja Rule, who is at his own home and replies to her by rapping and singing the next verse. Charli is then released from prison and rides a limo to the airport where she meets Ja Rule in an airplane. It then shifts to the two celebrating Charli's release from prison in a beach. The two were then spotted by the detectives (via binoculars) in the same beach, who were also in vacation. The music video ends with the detectives laughing, complimenting and telling each other that "you are the man" with the white detective saying "I love my job" just as they are about to approach Ja and Charli as the music video for Down 4 U starts. the video premiered on BET's Access Granted on April 13, 2002.

== Remix: "Down 4 U" ==
"Down 4 U" is the official remix of "Down Ass Bitch". It features The Inc. Records labelmates Charli Baltimore, Ashanti, & Vita. It was released as a single for Irv Gotti Presents: The Inc.. Its music video is revealed to be the sequel of "Down Ass Bitch"

== Chart performance ==
=== Weekly charts ===
Chart (2002)	Peak position
Australia (ARIA)	37
Australian Urban (ARIA)	12
Belgium (Ultratip Bubbling Under Wallonia)	11
Netherlands (Dutch Top 40 Tipparade)	5
Netherlands (Single Top 100)	55
Switzerland (Schweizer Hitparade)	75
UK Singles (OCC)	91
UK Hip Hop/R&B (OCC)	20
US Billboard Hot 100	21
US Hot R&B/Hip-Hop Songs (Billboard)	8
US Hot Rap Songs (Billboard)	5
US Rhythmic Airplay (Billboard)	9

=== Year-end charts ===
Chart (2002)	Position
US Hot R&B/Hip-Hop Songs (Billboard)	55

=== Certifications ===
Region	Certification	Certified units/sales
New Zealand (RMNZ)	Gold	15,000^{‡}
^{‡} Sales+streaming figures based on certification alone.
