= Murder Inc. Records =

American record label

Murder Inc. Records, LLC
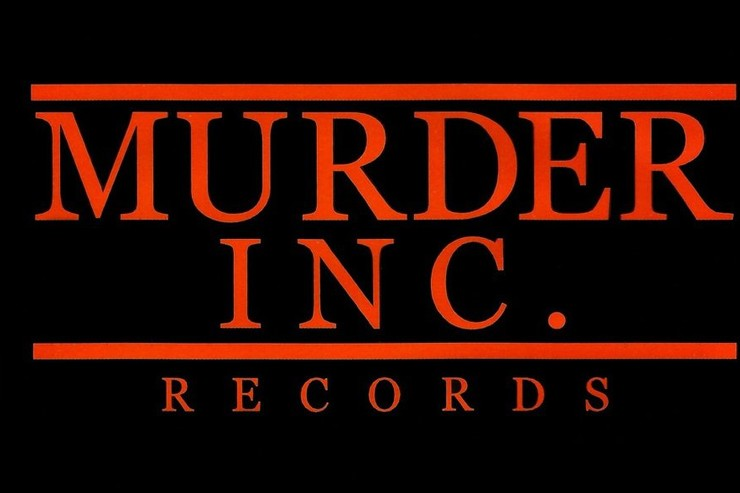
- Parent company: The Universal Music Group
- Founded: 1999; 27 years ago
- Founder: Chris Gotti; Irv Gotti
- Status: Active
- Distributors: Universal Music Distribution: (Def Jam Recordings (1999–2005); The Island Def Jam Music Group (1999–2005); Universal Motown)
- Genre: Hip hop; R&B
- Country of origin: United States
- Location: 29th floor, Worldwide Plaza, 825 8th Avenue, Midtown Manhattan, New York City, New York, U.S.
- Official website: www.murderinc-online.com/eng/home.php

Murder Inc. Records, LLC, also known as Murda Inc. and abbreviated as The Inc. Records, is an American record label founded by brothers and record executives Chris and Irv Gotti in 1999. The label's flagship artist was Ja Rule. According to Chris Gotti, Murder Inc. had sold over 30 million units worldwide and grossed over $500 million. As a collective, Murder Inc. artists were originally known as The Murderers, but later went by The Inc. for marketing purposes. Murder Inc. was headquartered at One Worldwide Plaza in Midtown Manhattan, New York City, New York, while their main studio was The Crackhouse, also located in New York City.

== History ==
=== Formation, success and raid (1999–2003) ===
After helping Def Jam with the success of DMX, Jay-Z, and Ja Rule, Russell Simmons gave Irv Gotti his own label under Def Jam. While watching Biography on A&E during gangster week, a Murder, Inc. logo appeared on the screen, inspiring Irv to name his label after the organized crime group, paralleling his desire to put out hit records to the crime group's purpose of putting out contract hits. Murder Inc.'s first set of artists were Ja Rule, Black Child, Tah Murdah and Nemesis. On June 1, 1999, Murder Inc. released its first studio album, Venni Vetti Vecci by Ja Rule. Featuring production from Irv Gotti (who also executive produced the album) as well as guest appearances from Murder Inc. artists Tah Murdah, Black Child and Nemesis in their debut commercial appearances, the album featured the hit single "Holla Holla" and soon was certified Platinum in the U.S., which made Ja Rule and Murder Inc. among the most popular artists and labels in the industry, respectively.

In March 2000, Murder Inc. released its debut compilation, Irv Gotti Presents: The Murderers, under the name The Murderers. Prior to the album's release, the album faced delays and pushback from Universal due to concerns about marketing over the name of the album as well as its violent and anti-police lyrics. That October Ja Rule released his second studio album, Rule 3:36. The album featured Ja Rule and Murder Inc.'s first top 15 hit with Between Me and You. The album featured production from Irv Gotti (who also executive produced the album) as well as appearances from Tah Murdah, Black Child, O-1 (previously known as Nemesis) and Murder Inc.'s first female artist Vita. The album marked a significant change in Murder Inc.'s musical style, shifting from hardcore hip hop to a more radio-friendly pop rap oriented sound that targeted the female demographic, which in turn resulted in greater commercial success. This formula would be a key factor in Murder Inc.'s later successes. The album debuted and peaked at number 1 on the Billboard 200, and would ultimately be certified triple platinum by the RIAA for selling three million units in America.

Murder Inc. signed Charli Baltimore and Ashanti in 2001. That same year, Ja Rule's most successful album, Pain Is Love, was released. The album was supported by the smash hit singles Always on Time (featuring Ashanti), Livin' It Up and Down Ass Bitch (featuring Charli Baltimore). Much of the album was produced by Irv Gotti. It sold over 360,000 units in its first week, and debuted and peaked at number one on the Billboard 200. The album sold over three million units in America, and was certified triple platinum by the RIAA.

This album was soon followed by Ashanti's multi-platinum selling debut, Ashanti, which spawned three hit singles on the Billboard charts. On July 2, 2002, Murder Inc. released the compilation, Irv Gotti Presents: The Inc. The album continued to showcase original artists like Ja Rule, Black Child, Vita, Jodie Mack, O-1 and Caddillac Tah, while showcasing new artists like Ashanti and Charli Baltimore and Murder Inc. affiliates like D.O., Ronnie Bumps and Merc. Murder Inc. scored another hit single with "Down 4 U", and the album peaked in the top 3 on the Billboard 200 and was ultimately certified Gold by the RIAA. A documentary of the same name as the compilation was released around the same time, documenting the careers and lives of Murder Inc. artists. However, less than two weeks after the release of the album, Vita severed ties with Murder Inc. Vita's departure resulted in La Dolce Vita being indefinitely shelved. During this time, Murder Inc. started associating with Nas as he collaborated with Ja Rule and Ashanti for the remix to "The Pledge". Although it was speculated that Nas would possibly sign to Murder Inc., the deal never materialized. Ja Rule's next album (The Last Temptation) went Platinum in the U.S.

On January 3, 2003, Murder Inc.'s headquarters at One Worldwide Plaza were raided by federal agents trying to find evidence regarding whether Murder Inc. was funneling and laundering drug money for Kenneth "Supreme" McGriff. Another setback the label suffered was its core artist Ja Rule participating in a feud with rapper 50 Cent, which had been occupant since 1999. 50 Cent's February 2003 debut album, Get Rich or Die Tryin', featured the song Back Down, which contained disparaging remarks towards Murder Inc. That same month, Murder Inc. vice president Chris Gotti, was shot in the leg outside the label's headquarters in Manhattan. The incident occurred at night while Lorenzo was reportedly en route to a nearby gym. He told police he heard gunfire behind him and then realized he had been shot. However, law enforcement officials expressed skepticism about his account, noting that the bullet's trajectory appeared consistent with an accidental self-inflicted wound. He was treated at Bellevue Hospital and released the following day. At the end of March, Murder Inc. was forced to leave One Worldwide Plaza, Def Jam's headquarters, in the aftermath of the raid. Although Def Jam CEO Lyor Cohen instead that the move was due to Murder Inc. expanding into film and touring, they were indeed forced out. That September, Murder Inc. affiliate D.O. was fatally shot in Jamaica, Queens. At the time of his death, he was in negotiations to sign with the label, but the deal was never finalized before his death. Blood in My Eye, Ja's fifth studio album, released in November 2003, included diss tracks aimed at 50 and G-Unit, as well as Eminem. The album did not match the commercial success of his previous albums. Three months earlier, Ashanti obtained more success on her own with a second studio album, Chapter II, becoming her second number-one album. Charli Baltimore, however, did not have any time to release an album under the label, causing her to leave in October 2003.

Murder Inc. and TVT Records were also blocked by Universal from releasing a Cash Money Click reunion album featuring Ja Rule, due to his contractual obligations. Def Jam was ordered to pay TVT $132 million in punitive damages in 2003. However, Def Jam won an appeal and instead only paid TVT $126,720. The Cash Money Click reunion album, scheduled for a November 2002 release through Murder Inc., was ultimately shelved.

Despite having a roster of many artists, the only artists to have released solo studio albums were Ashanti, Ja Rule, Vanessa Carlton, and Lloyd. Throughout Murder Inc.'s years, many artists were scheduled to release studio albums, but many artists on the label were shelved. Vita's debut album on Murder Inc., La Dolce Vita, was originally scheduled to be released on December 11, 2001, but was then delayed to Fall 2002 before being shelved after Vita left the label in April 2002. Caddillac Tah's debut album, Pov City Hustla, was originally scheduled to be released on November 13, 2001, through Murder Inc. However, the album was ultimately shelved. Black Child's debut album was originally scheduled to be released in January 2002, but was delayed to 2003 before being shelved completely. Other shelved albums intended to be released though Murder Inc. also include Ronnie Bumps' debut album and a D.O. Cannon and Merc collaboration album, which was shelved after D.O. Cannon was killed in 2003. The latter two albums were originally scheduled for a 2003 release.

=== The Inc. rebrand (2003–2008) ===
On December 4, 2003, during a press conference, Irv Gotti announced that in light of the recent changes, setbacks, and controversies surrounding the label, Murder Inc. would be renamed to The Inc. In 2004, Lloyd was signed and released his debut album Southside. Ja Rule would see his music return to form, with his Gold RIAA-selling sixth studio album R.U.L.E., while Ashanti would also release her fourth studio album, Concrete Rose, neither of which were as successful as both artists' previous works. At the end of 2004, they were ordered to leave Def Jam offices while the investigations were on. When the trials began in early 2005, Def Jam made them honor their contracts and release compilation albums; then they were not re-signed.

Murder Inc. spent 2005 and part of 2006 searching for distribution. In August 2006, Irv Gotti and The Inc. signed to Universal Motown and soon began releasing music. After settling in at Universal Motown, Irv Gotti signed pop artist Vanessa Carlton that year, a rare departure for the label from hip hop and R&B.

=== Decline (2007–2012) ===
On August 1, 2007, Ja Rule would return to radio and television on Sucker Free on MTV, where he debuted his single "Uh-Ohhh!!" with Lil Wayne and his return to recording music. The single was released to promote his new project, The Mirror, which was supposed to be released as his next album. However, the commercial failure of "Uh-Ohhh!!" and Ja Rule's other single "Body" led to The Mirror being released instead as a free mixtape.

On August 4, 2008, Lloyd released his third studio album, Lessons In Love. The album had some success on the Billboard 200, debuting and peaking in the top 10. However, the album's success paled in comparison to Street Love. It was the final album released from The Inc.

On May 5, 2009, in an interview with Angie Martinez, Irv Gotti stated that Murder Inc. was leaving Universal Motown. Though Irv discussed in the interview that he would most likely reunite with Lyor Cohen and move to Warner Music Group for distribution, this did not happen. That same month, Irv Gotti announced that he was officially releasing Ashanti from The Inc. Records, stating that "The relationship has run its course. The chemistry of what's needed — we're in two totally different places. You're talking to somebody that took her and shaped and molded her and put her out there for the world, and it blew up. We [hold the record] for the [fastest] selling debut by a female R&B artist — 503 [thousand]. We did it! My views and philosophies and her views and philosophies are not meeting up." Gotti also admitted that he and Ashanti have not spoken to each other in a long time. A month later Lloyd—who had been with Murder Inc. for 5 years—asked to be released from his contract. Lloyd cited the need for more control and change as reasons for his departure from the slowly shrinking label. "I'm ready for a change. There's no bad blood. I just feel I need to take more control over my career and get a fresh start. Hopefully Irv can understand my position," Lloyd explained in a press release.

"We find ourselves in limbo for the second time in three years," Henry 'Noonie' Lee, Lloyd's manager said in a statement. "It's frustrating to know that opportunities to advance Lloyd's career are out there but we can't exploit them due to our current situation. Even though Lloyd is appreciative of the opportunity that has been afforded him by Murder Inc., he feels it's time for him to move on and seek opportunities that will allow him to build and enhance his brand."

That same year, Ja Rule announced that he was no longer signed to Murder Inc. as well, the same label he had been with since its beginnings in 1997. Ja Rule decided to go independent on his own label, Mpire, which is distributed through Fontana. Although Ja Rule had departed from Murder Inc., he revealed he was still on great terms with Irv Gotti and the two worked together for Ja Rule's next album, Pain Is Love 2. Baltimore soon left the label in 2010 for new opportunities. With no proper distribution and its artists either leaving or fading into obscurity, The Inc. remained dormant with no further album releases.

=== Partnership deals (2013–2017) ===
In September 2013, Murder Inc. was relaunched as an umbrella label under Irv Gotti's new label, Visionary. On September 27, Murder Inc. released its first songs in years, Ja Rule's "Fresh Out da Pen" and "Everything", both produced by Murder Inc./Visionary producers Reefa and Myles William.

In June 2017, it was announced that Murder Inc. had partnered with 300.

=== Sale of master recordings and death of Irv Gotti (2022–2025) ===
In July 2022, Irv Gotti sold his fifty percent ownership stake in the master recordings of Murder Inc. to brand management and music rights company Iconoclast for $100 million. The remaining fifty percent is owned by the Universal Music Group.

Irv Gotti had suffered a minor stroke in early 2024 as a result of his diabetes, which caused him to change his dietary habits. On February 5, 2025, he died in New York City at the age of 54, following another stroke.

== Legal issues ==
=== United States v. Irving Lorenzo, et al. (2003–2005) ===
On January 3, 2003, federal agents and New York Police Department investigators raided the headquarters of Murder Inc., located at One Worldwide Plaza in Midtown Manhattan, after a $65 million check from Universal Music was written to Irv. Additionally, Murder Inc.'s head studio, The Crackhouse, was simultaneously raided the same day. The raids were a part of a year-long investigation into the connection between the Lorenzo brothers and American drug lord Kenneth "Supreme" McGriff. Investigators believed that the Lorenzos used over $1 million in drug money supplied by McGriff to launch Murder Inc. as a way to launder the illegal funds. Investigators also believed the brothers helped McGriff launder drug money through the making of the 2003 film Crime Partners. Although computers and documents were seized, no charges were immediately filed, and no arrests were immediately made. The raid was dramatized in the music video for Ja Rule's Murder Reigns. The probe was handled by prosecutors Carolyn Pokorny, Richard Weber, and Tracy Dayton. A week after the FBI seized bank accounts of companies related to the production and soundtrack of the film Crime Partners 2000 and two weeks later subpoenas for financial documents from Universal were requested. At the time Gotti was represented by law firm Kaye Scholer. In March, Murder Inc. was forced to leave One Worldwide Plaza, Def Jam's headquarters, in the aftermath of the raid. Although Def Jam CEO Lyor Cohen instead that the move was due to Murder Inc. expanding into film and touring, they were indeed forced out.

Chris and Irv "Gotti" Lorenzo's history with McGriff dated back to around 1995 at Irv's first music video shoot across the street from a Kentucky Fried Chicken McGriff frequented. When McGriff, newly paroled from prison, met Chris and Irv through a mutual friend. McGriff wanted to go into film production and sought help from the Lorenzo brothers to produce and direct a film based on Donald Goines' novel Crime Partners he had read while in jail. The Lorenzos from then on maintained a friendship with McGriff, helping initially finance for $250,000–300,000 then a $500,000 advance on a $1 million soundtrack deal for the dream film project, Crime Partners 2000. The film had McGriff credited as producer and co-writer, was released direct-to-video, and had appearances by Ja Rule, Charli Baltimore, Snoop Dogg, and Ice-T.

On January 25, 2005, the Lorenzos, talent manager Ronald Robinson, and bookkeeper Cynthia Brent surrendered to authorities in New York City and were officially charged with money laundering and conspiracy to launder money. The brothers were released on $1 million bonds after putting up their parent's home to receive the funds. The trial was presided over by judge Edward Korman. A task force was created by the office of Roslynn Mauskopf with Raymond Kelly, Pasquale D'Amuro, Michael J. Thomas, and William G. McMahon. During the trial, Irv was represented by Gerald B. Lefcourt, and Chris was represented by Gerald Shargel, if convicted the brothers and the two Murder Inc staff members each could have faced an unlikely maximum of 20 years in prison. In December 2005, the Lorenzos were acquitted of all charges. Legal fees were in excess of $10 million.

== Roster ==
Artists

- Ashanti (2001–2009)
- Charli "Chuck" Baltimore
- Lloyd (2004–2009)
- Ja Rule
- Black Child
- Vita (1999 – July 10, 2002)
- Caddillac Tah/Tah Murdah
- O1/Nemesis
- Jodie Mack

Producers

- Irv Gotti (deceased)

Staff

- Irv Gotti (founder, president/CEO, executive producer) (deceased)
- Chris Gotti (vice president, co-founder, A&R)
- Cynthia Brent (bookkeeper)
- Ron Robinson (management)
- Errol Vaughn Jr. (A&R)(2001–2007)
- Donnell Nichols (former)

== Releases ==
Murder Inc./The Inc. releases
Album information
Venni Vetti Vecci by Ja Rule
- Released: June 1, 1999
- Chart positions: No. 3 US
- RIAA certification: Platinum
- Singles: "Holla Holla", "Murda 4 Life", "Daddy's Little Baby"
Irv Gotti Presents: The Murderers by The Murderers
- Released: March 21, 2000
- Chart positions: No. 15 US
- Singles: Holla Holla (Remix)
Rule 3:36 by Ja Rule
- Released: October 10, 2000
- Chart positions: No. 1 US
- RIAA certification: 3× Platinum
- Singles: "Between Me and You", "Put It on Me", "6 Feet Underground", "I Cry"
The Fast and the Furious (soundtrack) by Various Artists
- Released: June 5, 2001
- Chart positions: No. 7 US
- RIAA certification: Platinum
- Singles: "POV City Anthem", "Furious", "Put It on Me (Remix)"
Pain Is Love by Ja Rule
- Released: October 2, 2001
- Chart positions: No. 1 US
- RIAA certification: 3× Platinum
- Singles: "Livin' It Up", "Always on Time", "Down Ass Bitch"
Ashanti by Ashanti
- Released: April 2, 2002
- Chart positions: No. 1
- RIAA certification: 3× Platinum
- Singles: "Foolish", "Happy", "Baby"
Irv Gotti Presents: The Inc. by The Inc. Records
- Released: July 2, 2002
- Chart positions: No. 3 US
- RIAA certification: Gold
- Singles: "Ain't It Funny (Murder Remix)", "Down 4 U"
Irv Gotti Presents: The Remixes by The Inc. Records
- Released: November 2, 2002
- Chart positions: No. 24 US
The Last Temptation by Ja Rule
- Released: November 19, 2002
- Chart positions: No. 4 US
- RIAA certification: 2× Platinum
- Singles: "Thug Lovin'", "Mesmerize", "Murder Reigns"
Chapter II by Ashanti
- Released: July 1, 2003
- Chart positions: No. 1 US
- RIAA certification: Platinum
- Singles: "Rock wit U (Awww Baby)", "Rain on Me", "Breakup 2 Makeup"
Ashanti's Christmas by Ashanti
- Released: November 18, 2003
- Chart positions: No. 160 US
Blood in My Eye by Ja Rule
- Released: November 4, 2003
- Chart positions: No. 6 US
- Singles: "Clap Back"
Southside by Lloyd
- Released: July 20, 2004
- Chart positions: No. 11 US
- RIAA certification: Gold
- Singles: "Southside", "Hey Young Girl"
Concrete Rose by Ashanti
- Released: December 14, 2004
- Chart positions: No. 7 US
- RIAA certification: Platinum
- Singles: "Only U", "Don't Let Them"
R.U.L.E. by Ja Rule
- Released: November 8, 2004
- Chart positions: No. 7 US
- RIAA certification: Gold
- Singles: "Wonderful", "New York", "Caught Up"
Exodus by Ja Rule
- Released: December 6, 2005
- Chart positions: No. 107 US Billboard 200
Collectables by Ashanti by Ashanti
- Released: December 6, 2005
- Chart positions: No. 59 US
- Singles: "Still On It"
Street Love by Lloyd
- Release: March 13, 2007
- Chart positions: No. 2 US
- RIAA certification: Gold
- Singles: "You", "Get It Shawty"
Heroes and Thieves by Vanessa Carlton
- Release: October 9, 2007
- Chart positions: No. 44 US
- Singles: "Nolita Fairytale", "Hands On Me"
The Declaration by Ashanti
- Release: June 3, 2008
- Chart positions: No. 6 US
- Singles: "The Way That I Love You", "Good Good"
Lessons in Love by Lloyd
- Release: August 5, 2008
- Chart positions: No. 7 US
- Singles: "How We Do It (Around My Way)", "Girls Around the World"

== See also ==
- List of record labels
- List of artists signed to The Inc. Records
