= Put It on Me (Ja Rule song) =

2001 single by Ja Rule

Single by Ja Rule featuring Lil' Mo and Vita

from the album Rule 3:36, The Fast and The Furious, and Pain Is Love (special edition)
- Released: January 9, 2001
- Genre: R&B; Hip Hop
- Length: 4:23
- Label: Def Jam; Murder Inc.
- Songwriters: Jeffrey Atkins; Irving Lorenzo; Taheem Crocker; Cynthia Loving
- Producers: Irv Gotti; Tru Stylze

Ja Rule singles chronology
"Between Me and You" (2000)	"Put It on Me" (2001)	"6 Feet Underground" (2000)

Vita singles chronology
"Vita, Vita, Vita" (2000)	"Put It on Me" (2001)	"Lapdance" (2001)

Lil' Mo singles chronology
"I'll Trade (A Million Bucks)" (2000)	"Put It on Me" (remix) (2001)	"Superwoman Pt. II" (2001)

"Put It on Me" is the second single from American rapper Ja Rule's second studio album, Rule 3:36 (2000), released in January 2001 through Def Jam and Murder Inc. Records. The song appeared on The Fast and the Furious soundtrack (2001) and was included on the special edition of Ja Rule's Pain Is Love (2001). "Put It on Me" features fellow Murder Inc. artist Vita, with her verse being written by Caddillac Tah.

Originally, the song appeared on Rule 3:36 and only featured Ja Rule with Vita until a remixed version was recorded with new vocals by singer Lil' Mo. Ja Rule explained that the lyrics of the song were inspired by an argument he had with his wife to show how important she is to him. The song peaked at number eight on the US Billboard Hot 100 on the week of March 19, 2001, making it Ja Rule's first top-10 hit on the chart.

== Accolades ==
- In 2001, the song's music video became the first to retire on BET's 106 & Park after spending more than 60 days on the countdown. The video also topped BET's Notarized: Top 100 Videos of 2001.
- In September 2001, the video was nominated for "Best Rap Video" at the 2001 MTV VMAs.
- In 2002, "Put It on Me" won two BMI Awards under "Urban Music" and "Pop Music". The song also attained an ASCAP Rhythm & Soul Music Award, alongside the honorary "Songwriter of the Year" award to Murder Inc. executive, Irv Gotti.

== Charts ==
=== Weekly charts ===
Weekly chart performance for "Put It on Me"
Chart (2001)	Peak position
Belgium (Ultratip Bubbling Under Flanders)	8
Netherlands (Dutch Top 40)	9
Netherlands (Single Top 100)	7
US Billboard Hot 100	8
US Hot R&B/Hip-Hop Songs (Billboard)	2
US Hot Rap Songs (Billboard)	11
US Pop Airplay (Billboard)	24
US Rhythmic Airplay (Billboard)	1

=== Year-end charts ===
Year-end chart performance for "Put It on Me"
Chart (2001)	Position
Netherlands (Dutch Top 40)	79
Netherlands (Single Top 100)	63
US Billboard Hot 100	30
US Hot R&B/Hip-Hop Singles & Tracks (Billboard)	12
US Mainstream Top 40 (Billboard)	89
US Rhythmic Top 40 (Billboard)	3

== Certifications ==
Certifications for "Put It on Me"
Region	Certification	Certified units/sales
New Zealand (RMNZ)	Platinum	30,000^{‡}
United Kingdom (BPI)	Silver	200,000^{‡}
^{‡} Sales+streaming figures based on certification alone.
