= Whitney Houston videography =

Videos and media by American singer

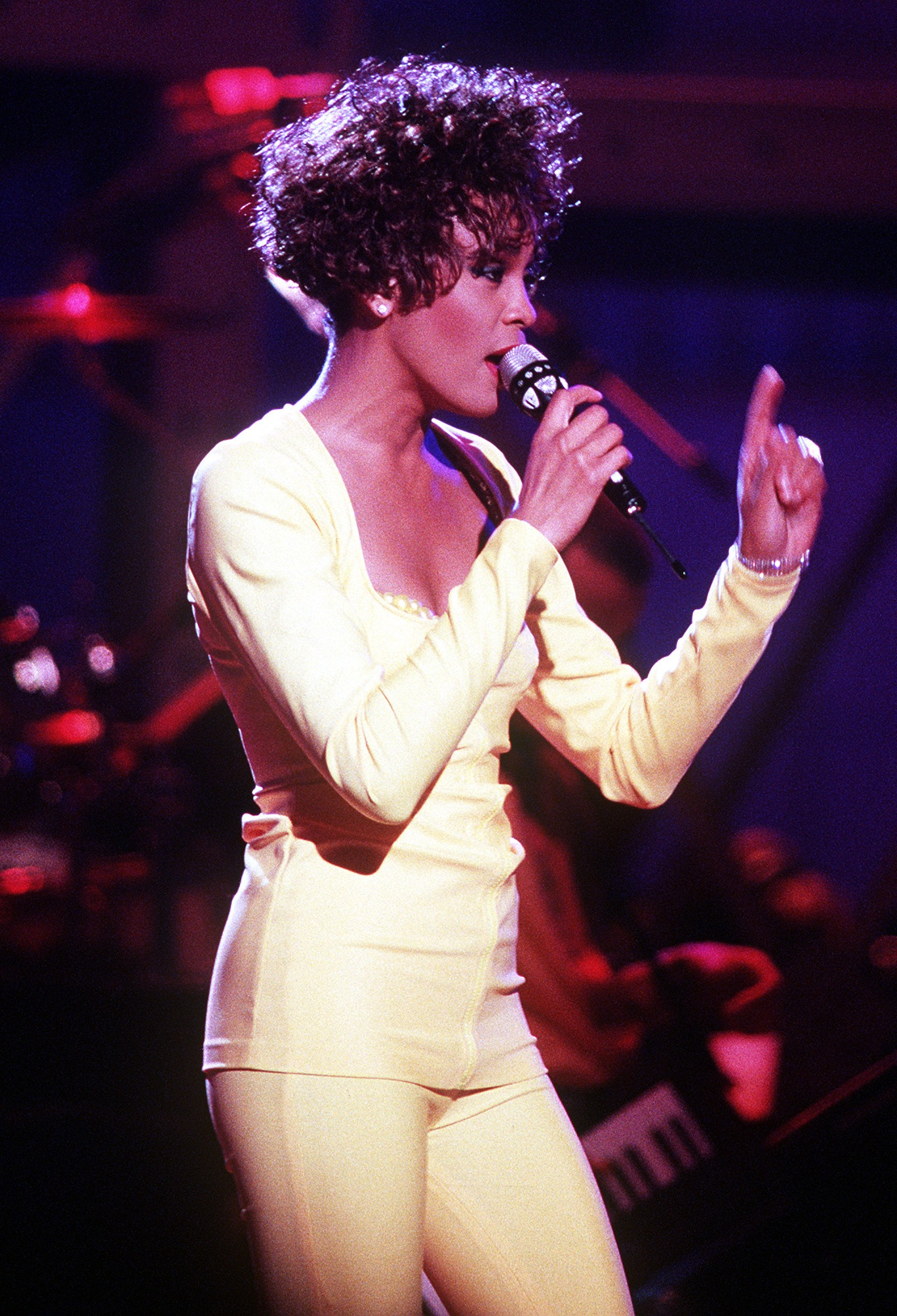
- Whitney Houston performing during the Welcome Home Heroes concert
- Music videos: 42
- Concert tour videos: 11
- Documentary videos: 2
- Music video compilations: 4
- Music video box sets: 2
- Promotional videos: 4
- Video singles: 3

The videography of American cultural icon Whitney Houston, nicknamed “The Voice”, consists of fifty-five music videos, four music video compilations, a concert tour video and three music video singles. In 1983, Houston signed a recording contract with Arista Records and two years later released her eponymous debut album. Houston's first music video was for the single "You Give Good Love", which was selected to establish her in the black marketplace first. Houston then released the video of her worldwide hit "Saving All My Love for You". The following video, for the song "How Will I Know", helped introduce the singer to a wider audience when it became one of the first videos by a black female singer to earn heavy rotation on MTV and established her as a pop culture icon. It won MTV Video Music Award for Best Female Video at its 3rd ceremony of 1986. "Greatest Love of All", the final single released from Houston's debut album, helped cement the M.O. for the classic Whitney video.

In June 1986, Houston released her first video compilation The No. 1 Video Hits, containing her four music videos off the Whitney Houston album. It entered at number-one on the Billboard Top Music Videocassettes chart and stayed there for 22 weeks, which remains the all-time record for a video collection by a female artist, it was also certified Platinum for shipments of 100,000 units by the Recording Industry Association of America (RIAA) on July 15, 1986. In 1987, Houston released the music video for "I Wanna Dance with Somebody (Who Loves Me)", the first single from her second album Whitney (1987), which depicts Houston in one of her iconic looks, the clip―towering curly wig, colorful dangly earrings and a series of going-to-the-club outfits. In 1988, the music video for the song "One Moment in Time", the title track off the 1988 Summer Olympics Album: One Moment in Time, was released.

In October 1990, Houston released the video for her song "I'm Your Baby Tonight", the title track from the singer's third album I'm Your Baby Tonight (1990). The following year, "All the Man That I Need" was released as a music video. In 1991, due to overwhelming response to her performance of "The Star Spangled Banner" at Super Bowl XXV, it was released as a video single, which was certified 2× Platinum by the RIAA in April 1991. Such Houston's patriotism-boosting-performance for the national anthem led her to give the Welcome Home Heroes with Whitney Houston concert, in honor of those returning from the Gulf War. The concert was released in VHS that same year and was certified Gold for shipments of 50,000 units by the RIAA. "I Will Always Love You" was the music video for the lead single off the soundtrack for Houston's 1992 film debut The Bodyguard. Having sold over 45 million copies worldwide, the soundtrack is the best-selling soundtrack album of all time. In 1995 and 1996, Houston starred in and contributed on the soundtracks for two films: Waiting to Exhale (1995), which generated the music video for the song "Exhale (Shoop Shoop)"; and The Preacher's Wife (1996). In 1998, Houston released the video for "When You Believe" from The Prince of Egypt Soundtrack, alongside American singer Mariah Carey. In November 1998, Houston released her fourth studio album My Love Is Your Love, whose singles "Heartbreak Hotel", "It's Not Right But It's Okay", and "My Love Is Your Love" all had heavy rotation on MTV.

Houston began the 2000s with her first greatest hits compilation album, Whitney: The Greatest Hits, the homonymous video compilation spawned three then new videos, including two for the duet songs that she collaborated on, with Enrique Iglesias on "Could I Have This Kiss Forever", and with George Michael on "If I Told You That". In December 2002, Houston released her fifth studio album, Just Whitney. Two music videos from the album, "Whatchulookinat" and "Try It on My Own", were considered her answers to the media for getting too deep into her personal life and to malicious rumours surrounding her then-public image. In August 2009, Houston returned to the music scene with her fourth Billboard 200 number-one album, I Look to You, which yielded her final two videos, "I Look to You" and "Million Dollar Bill".

Most of Houston's notable videos involve just a bit of perfunctory storyline and focus on her performance, however, several sources recognized her as one of the pioneers who laid the groundwork and broke down barriers with the videos during her generation. In addition, Houston has also been recognized for being one of the "most preeminent divas of the early music video age." In 2003, VH1 ranked Houston at number three on the list of '50 Greatest Women of the Video Era'. In February 2012, TIME, on a photo article in honor of Black History Month, listed her as one of '50 Cultural Giants'. Gil Kaufman from MTV News said that "[Houston] proved you could make a fuss without making a spectacle."

== Music videos ==
=== 1980s ===
Year	Title	Director	Note(s)
1985	"You Give Good Love"	Michael Lindsay-Hogg	The video features Houston rehearsing for a performance on stage and an off-duty cameraman entering a club that's being refurbished. Taken aback by her impressive singing, the man begins filming Houston as she performs.
1985	"All at Once" (Version 1)	—N/a	The video was released in some European countries. It features Houston singing the song on a stage.
1985	"All at Once" (Version 2)	—N/a	Arista released a promotional music video exclusive to Germany.
1985	"Saving All My Love for You"	Stuart Orme	Houston takes the role of a woman who's saving all of her love for a married man whose family clearly takes precedence over the cupcake he's seeing on the side.; The video won Favorite Soul/R&B Video award at the 13th American Music Awards, held on January 27, 1986.
1985	"How Will I Know"	Brian Grant	The video is set against a strikingly designed, vividly colored setting of video screens and partitions. Houston, accented by a tight and sleeveless gray dress made of metal mesh and a bow hair band, is seen interacting with animated dancers, in black outfits and wearing French-style makeup. The video also has a scene of splattering of paint and it's dripping down the screen.; Houston family friend and label-mate, Aretha Franklin, makes a cameo as a footage from her "Freeway of Love" video.; Houston won Best Female Video award for the video at the 3rd MTV Video Music Awards on September 5, 1986.
1986	"Greatest Love of All"	Peter Israelson	In the video, she is a successful singer about to perform in front of an audience at the theater. She reminisces about the time when she was a child performing in a talent competition at the very same theater. The video features Houston's mother Cissy Houston playing herself and then 10-year-old girl Keara Janine as a young Whitney.; The video was filmed at Harlem's Apollo Theater in New York City in spring of 1986.; Houston earned Favorite Soul/R&B Video award for the video at the 14th American Music Awards, held on January 26, 1987.
1987	"I Wanna Dance with Somebody (Who Loves Me)" (Version 1)	Brian Grant	In the intro of this video, Houston just finishes a performance onstage. She walks backstage, and the scene is intercut with more vivid, colorful images of her. Dressed in a body-hugging purple dress, towering curly wig and colorful dangly earrings, Houston focuses on singing directly into the camera while a series of dancers showed off their moves with flashing fluorescent backdrops in wide-shot cutaways as she changed through a series of going-to-the-club outfits.; Grant, in an interview with the BBC News in February 2012, noted that because Whitney could not dance in any way whatsoever, the solution was to surround the singer with top talent, and keep her own dance moves to a minimum in the video, which was choreographed by Arlene Phillips.; Houston was nominated for Best Music Video for the video at the 1988 Soul Train Music Awards.
1987	"I Wanna Dance with Somebody (Who Loves Me)" (Version 2)	Brian Grant	Only includes studio scenes, added some extra shots that was not shown in version 1.
1987	"Didn't We Almost Have It All" (Live)	—N/a	A live performance of the song in Saratoga Springs, New York in September 1987 among her Moment of Truth World Tour dates.; The video premiered at the 4th MTV Video Music Awards and then it was used as a promotional clip for the song, which had already peaked at number one the Billboard Hot 100 chart without the official music video.
1987	"So Emotional"	Wayne Isham	The video was filmed at Lehigh University's Stabler Arena in Bethlehem, Pennsylvania on October 21, 1987. The night's large audience, admitted by free tickets given away at area record stores the previous days, and three-tier stage were set up to simulate a concert. Also, a five-man band accompanied Houston during the taping. Houston had 17 days of rehearsal at Stabler that summer to prepare for the night's filming.; The first half of the video features scenes of a rehearsal for the filming and the second Houston's staged performance for the song.
1988	"Where Do Broken Hearts Go"	Peter Israelson	The video, one of only a few videos among Houston's, has a storyline that a couple reunite after a short separation. Houston who plays herself as a singing star, receives a package containing a bunch of white roses and a goodbye card from her boyfriend in her dressing room. Then she reminisces about good memories with him, being switched in black and white.
1988	"Love Will Save the Day" (Live)	Jeff Margolis	A live performance from the Special Olympics opening ceremonies at the Notre Dame Stadium in Notre Dame, Indiana, held on August 2, 1987 and broadcast on ABC the following day.
1988	"One Moment in Time" (Version 1 and 2)	—N/a	There are two versions, but Houston doesn't appear on both videos. The first half of the version one shows children dreaming of becoming an Olympic medalist with scenes of their running, balancing on a beam, swimming and playing baseball. The latter contains various players in sports games. The version one accompanies to a three-minute-edited-song from the original album version. The version two features only footages from the 1988 Summer Olympics in Seoul: the Olympic torch and various athletes who won medals at the Olympics.

=== 1990s ===
Year	Title	Director(s)	Note(s)
1990	"I'm Your Baby Tonight" (US version) (LA & Babyface Mix)	Julien Temple	Houston travels in time and space through mirrors, which were served as media of her time travel. During the trip, she pays tribute to three different legends in film and music industries: Marlene Dietrich who was famous for her masculine wardrobe, The Supremes who was one of notable artists during Motown's glory days, and Audrey Hepburn in the movie Funny Face. Adam Shankman who subsequently established a partnership with Temple, choreographed the video for Houston.; Two years before directing this video, Julien Temple had ridiculed Houston's commercial endorsement for Diet Coke in the "This Note's for You" video by Neil Young.
1990	"I'm Your Baby Tonight" (International version) (Yvonne Turner Remix Edit)	Julien Temple	
1991	"All the Man That I Need"	Peter Israelson	The video consists mainly of a house and stage set scenes, later switched by big grid-windows. The clip features Houston donning a curly hairstyle, and wearing a black turtleneck with her initials "WH" embroidered on it (house scenes) and a tight, off-the-shoulder blue-black dress made of velvet (stage scenes).
1991	"The Star Spangled Banner"	Bob Best	A live performance at the Super Bowl XXV in Tampa, Florida on January 27, 1991. Arista released the performance as a video single on February 8, 1991 and it earned 2× Platinum certification from the Recording Industry Association of America on April 11, 1991.
1991	"Miracle"	Jim Yukich	A black-and-white video features Houston singing the song with sitting on a steppladder styled chair or leaning against the wall at a small amphitheater. The singing parts are interspersed with black-and-white pictures showing people in a variety of circumstances.
1991	"My Name Is Not Susan" (Version 1)	Lionel Martin	In the clip containing several elements inspired by the Alfred Hitchcock movie, Vertigo, Houston plays a double role as herself and a photographer's client named Susan. Like in the movie, the video features a man who has an obsessive love for a glamorous blonde and later tries to make a brown-haired girl played by the same actress look like the blonde.; Mike Tyson makes a cameo.
1991	"My Name Is Not Susan" (Version 2) (L.A. Reid & Babyface Remix featuring Monie Love)	Lionel Martin	A rapper Monie Love's scenes were added to version one, accompanying the L.A. Reid & Babyface Remix of the song.
1991	"My Name Is Not Susan" (Version 3) (Waddell 7" Mix)	—N/a	Among her I'm Your Baby Tonight World Tour dates, the May 11, 1991 Oakland Coliseum performance of the song, broadcast on The Simple Truth: A Concert for Kurdish Refugees, is interspersed with a series of scenes from Houston's previous music videos.
1991	"I Belong to You"	—N/a	A video montage, being made with scenes from the "My Name Is Not Susan" video and some extra footages during filming of the "Susan".
1992	"I Will Always Love You"	Nick Brandt	The video begins with the performance of the song Houston gives at the end of the film The Bodyguard. The video then cuts to Houston in a dark blue suit sitting in an empty theater with the spotlight shining on her, singing of her love. The video is intercut with scenes from The Bodyguard and gives the viewer the experience of reliving the moments with the singer.; At the time of releasing the video, the director's name was known only as Alan Smithee, the nom de camera that directors use when they don't want their names associated with projects, making his MTV debut for directing the video. But it was found later that the video had been really directed by Nick Brandt.; The clip won Favorite New Music Video award at the 19th People's Choice Awards, held on March 17, 1993.
1993	"I'm Every Woman"	Randee St. Nicholas	The video features a very pregnant Houston performing the song, while scenes from The Bodyguard are intercut into the clip. Also, features cameo appearances by Cissy Houston, as well as by Chaka Khan who recorded the song originally, the song's composer Valerie Simpson, and then label-mates TLC.
1993	"I Have Nothing"	S.A. Baron	The video shows alternately Houston singing with the Cleopatra-inspired beaded head-piece and performing the song during a dinner party scene from The Bodyguard. The clip is interspersed with the Oscar ceremony scenes, the climax of the movie.
1993	"Run to You"	Mitchell Sinoway	Features scenes from The Bodyguard film showing briefly how a music star Rachel Marron (Houston) and her bodyguard Frank Farmer (Kevin Costner) fall in love, which are intercut with close-ups of Houston singing the lyrics and scenes of her running on clouds.
1994	"Queen of the Night"	Mick Jackson	In the video, Houston's performance, her metallic costume and the film sets are all inspired by scenes from Fritz Lang's 1927 silent film Metropolis, in particular, Maria's transformation scene and a seductive dance scene by the false Maria. While playing the clips from Lang's movie on multi-screen in the back, Houston performs on a nightclub stage, dressed in the costume influenced by Brigitte Helm's from Lang's movie.
1995	"Exhale (Shoop Shoop)"	Forest Whitaker	The video focuses mainly on close-ups of Houston, like she originally intended the video to be direct and concentrate on her face and on the lyrics. The close-ups are intercut with scenes from the movie, Waiting to Exhale.
1996	"Count On Me" (with CeCe Winans)	Wayne Isham	A simulated concert video, directed by Isham who is a renowned live concert film director. The first half of the video, filmed in black-and-white, features Houston and Winans rehearsing the song at a small theater. With being switched into colored pictures, the latter cuts to two singers performing the song before an audience. The video is intercut with footage from Waiting to Exhale.
1996	"Why Does It Hurt So Bad" (Live)	Bruce Gowers and Troy Miller	A live performance at the 1996 MTV Movie Awards in Burbank, California on June 8, 1996.
1996	"I Believe in You and Me"	F. Gary Gray	Houston sings the song, leaning against a tree or being surrounded by an orchestra in an outdoor forest setting where the trees are all in Christmas lighting. The video, shot in Fishkill, New York, is intercut with clips from the film, The Preacher's Wife.; Entertainment Tonight debuted the video on December 11, 1996, and the following day its entire video was premiered on MTV, VH1 and BET.
1997	"Step by Step"	Paul Hunter	The video shows mainly Houston wearing a brown raincoat and dancing to the song on a center stage while other dancers join her as the song develops. Houston's footages are intercut with scenes of a youth center, being restored by youngsters after a fire.
1998	"When You Believe" (with Mariah Carey)	Phil Joanou	The video consists of a large screen painted to resemble one of the backdrops from the film The Prince of Egypt; part of it rises to reveal Houston who steps forward and sings the 1st verse and chorus. This maneuver is repeated for Carey who sings the 2nd verse and chorus, during which Houston and Carey walk towards each other and join hands. Above the audience, unseen until the climax of the bridge and giving cheers to both singers to emulate a concert-like-setting, are three giant video screens showing scenes from the animated film. Occasionally interspersed throughout are quick, black-and-white clips of both singers backstage.; The video was filmed at the Brooklyn Academy of Music performing arts center and premiered worldwide on MTV during Mariah TV segment on November 16, 1998.
1998	"When You Believe" (Alternative version) (with Mariah Carey)	Mary Lambert	Only released on NBC's special, When You Believe: Music Inspired by the Prince of Egypt, broadcast on December 13, 1998.; The video features only both females singing together on a stage that simulates a large stone altar in the middle of a church without an audience, choir or images.
1999	"Heartbreak Hotel" (featuring Faith Evans and Kelly Price) + Hex Hector Radio Mix version	Kevin Bray	Throughout the video, Houston is seen in full diva mode, wearing a giant white fur coat, ruby red gown and a signature choker. At the end of the video she throws the all-white fur coat into the ocean.; Houston filmed the video in various parts of Miami; a nearby airport hangar, the National hotel and Miami Beach on January 5–6, 1999.; The video was nominated for Best R&B Video at the 1999 MTV Video Music Awards, held on September 9, 1999.
1999	"It's Not Right But It's Okay" + Thunderpuss Mix version + Rodney Jerkins Smooth Mix version	Kevin Bray	Features Houston wearing a sleek strapless leather gown and singing around a glass dining table against the all-black background with lights flashing occasionally. A large group of women from different races sing the chorus behind her. The dance footages by female dancers in army uniforms are interspersed throughout the first half of the video.
1999	"My Love Is Your Love" (Version 1) + Jonathan Peters' Radio Mix version	Kevin Bray	Houston's haircut and fashion in the video are strongly reminiscent of then Lauryn Hill: a short and fairly tight afro, and a denim jacket. On a street party scene, Houston is seen performing on the stage with Wyclef Jean who is the song's co-composer and co-producer, just behind her on the deck.; The video received its worldwide exclusive first play on MTV UK on May 17, 1999.
1999	"I Learned from the Best" + HQ_{2} Uptempo Mix version	Kevin Bray	The video was filmed at the Cologne Sports Arena in Cologne, Germany, on October 7, 1999. The process of filming the video was taped and broadcast on MTV's Making the Video on November 2, 1999 (season 1, episode 17).; During the episode, Kevin Bray said that "the concept of the video is that a female singer (Houston) is performing the song first time live on television with the studio audience, and her ex-lover who isn't in the audience has no idea what the song's about for at first, however, he finally finds out that the song's actually about him."
1999	"My Love Is Your Love" (Version 2, Live)	Julia Knowles	An edited version from her medley performance of "Get It Back" and the song at 1999 MTV Europe Music Awards in Dublin, Ireland on November 11, 1999.

=== 2000s ===
Year	Title	Director	Note(s)
2000	"Could I Have This Kiss Forever" (with Enrique Iglesias)	Francis Lawrence	Entertainment Tonight aired the world premiere of the video on June 22, 2000.
2000	"If I Told You That" (with George Michael)	Kevin Bray	The video features Houston and Michael in a nightclub. At first, the two sing in different areas of the club, however, eventually meet on the dance floor and dance together with the crowd around them.; MTV Germany had the world premiere of the video on June 9, 2000.
2000	"Fine"	Kevin Bray	The video features Houston singing the song at a rooftop cocktail party. Bobby Brown makes a cameo.
2002	"Whatchulookinat"	Kevin Bray	A video considered Houston's answer to the media for delving into her personal life. The video shows a white set with an overhead camera, following Houston's every move, and mirrors on its walls. Another set has a backdrop with old-fashioned cameras and children dressed as 1950s reporters and photographers, holding cameras in their hands.; Faith Evans makes a cameo appearance in the beginning of the video.; The video was included on the Just Whitney Special Limited Edition bonus DVD.
2002	"Love to Infinity Megamix"	—N/a	A video montage for the megamix, containing portions of "I Wanna Dance with Somebody", "So Emotional", "I'm Your Baby Tonight", "I'm Every Woman", and "It's Not Right But It's Okay".; The video was included on a bonus DVD with the special limited edition of the Just Whitney album.
2002	"One of Those Days"	Kevin Bray	The plot revolves around Houston and her friends having a day for the ladies, highlighted by time at the spa. They end their evening by hitting the club, and who should be there but Mr. Biggs himself, Ron Isley.; The video was shot on October 18 and 19 in Atlanta.
2003	"Try It on My Own"	David LaChapelle	The video opens with music industry insiders waiting for Houston to appear, staring at their watches. As Houston starts singing, the panel is bewildered, holding up lyrics from "Over the Rainbow". This scene parodies her high-profile firing by Burt Bacharach from the 2000 Academy Awards ceremony for not singing "Rainbow" during rehearsals for the show. She continues to sing "On My Own" as the insiders leave in frustration due to Houston not following their prescribed formula. The video then cuts to Houston performing with a gospel choir in front of her cheering fans.; Bobby Brown makes a cameo at the beginning of the video.; Houston shot the video at Overtown's historic Lyric Theater, one of the oldest African American-owned theaters in the South. (A caption at the end of the video gives such information.) It premiered on BET's 106 & Park on April 11, 2003.; The video was released as a DVD single featuring the "One of Those Days" video by Arista on May 20, 2003 and certified Gold for shipments of 25,000 units by the RIAA on September 22, 2003.
2009	"I Look to You"	Melina Matsoukas	The video features Houston in front of a plain beige and gray backdrop with different angles of her. She is sitting on a concrete pillar with a spotlight focused on her. Toward the end of the video, flowers are shown falling around her. Houston is wearing a white dress against the beige and grey background.; It premiered on September 10, 2009 on Houston's official website.; Houston won Outstanding Music Video for the video at the 41st NAACP Image Awards, held on February 26, 2010.
2009	"Million Dollar Bill"	Melina Matsoukas	The video begins with Houston entering a dry cleaners and making her way through a kitchen wearing a fur coat. On exiting the kitchen, the music begins, and she walks into a club whilst removing her coat and sings on a small stage, dressed in a metallic dress and knee-high boots. At the end of the video, Houston walks away with dollar bills blowing around her. This would be the last music video to be released in Houston's lifetime before her death in 2012.

=== 2010s ===
Year	Title	Director	Note(s)
2012	"Celebrate" (with Jordin Sparks)	Marcus Raboy	Sparks hosts a party at her place with fellow cast members of the film Sparkle in attendance. Footage from the film, mainly focusing on Houston, is spliced in throughout the clip. At the end of the video, Sparks wears a T-shirt with Houston's image: the I'm Your Baby Tonight album cover. The video is capped off with a message that reads "In loving memory of Whitney Houston".
2012	"Never Give Up" (Lyric video)	—N/a	The video was posted on Houston's official Vevo channel on November 6, 2012, to promote her compilation album I Will Always Love You: The Best of Whitney Houston.

=== As featured artist and cameo appearances ===
Year	Title	Director	Note(s)
1986	"Stop the Madness" (among the Stop the Madness)	John Langley	The first anti-drug music video which features then-First Lady Nancy Reagan in special sequences filmed at the White House and a host of celebrities, as well as Houston singing solo and as part of a chorus in the recording studio along with other vocalists. It was created by the Entertainment Industries Council for a Drug-Free Society in an attempt get America's children to say "no" to drugs. The video premiered on NBC's Friday Night Videos on January 17, 1986.
1986	"King Holiday" (among the King Dream Chorus and Holiday Crew)	Michele Clark	The video was shot at the Martin Luther King, Jr. Center for Nonviolent Social Change in Atlanta where most of the participants assembled for filming of the video, as well as in New York and Los Angeles. Houston's scenes in the video were filmed in a separate place.
1989	"Celebrate New Life" (with BeBe & CeCe Winans)	Jeff Zimmerman	Houston makes a cameo, appearing to sing along with BeBe and CeCe on stage, where they perform together close to the end of the video.
1989	"It Isn't, It Wasn't, It Ain't Never Gonna Be" (with Aretha Franklin)	—N/a	A video montage of Houston's scenes from her "So Emotional" video and Franklin's from the "Freeway of Love" video.
1993	"Light of Love" (with Angie and Debbie Winans)	—N/a	The video featured Houston singing background vocals.
1994	"Something in Common" (with Bobby Brown)	Andy Morahan	―
1997	"Feelin' Inside"	Scott Kalvert	Houston makes a guest appearance in Bobby Brown's video. It begins with Houston's brief rendition of "Nobody Does It Better" and then shows her legs entering the white room where Brown sits on a chair. In the video, she plays Mr. Brown's therapist, saying, "So, Mr. Brown, tell me about this feeling inside" at the beginning. The dance scenes portraying Brown's dream or mental state have him dancing with several skeletons and female dancers. In the white room scenes, the camera does not show Houston's whole face, only her legs, eyes and lips. Eventually, the video ends showing Houston leaving the room and saying "So, I'll be seeing you tomorrow, Mr. Brown."; The video was delivered to national and local video outlets on September 28, 1997.
2002	"Down 4 U"	—N/a	The video for the song performed by Irv Gotti featuring Ja Rule, Ashanti, Vita and Charli Baltimore, Houston and Bobby Brown have a five-second cameo, shown drinking champagne on the beach. The video premiered on BET's 106 & Park on May 20, 2002.
2003	"Dance with My Father"	Diane Martel	For the video of the song performed by Luther Vandross, Houston submitted two pictures of her own: a photo of Luther scooping Houston up in his arms and one of her wedding photos along with her father, the late John Houston.

== Video albums ==
=== Music video compilations ===
Title	Video details	Peak chart positions														Certifications
Title	Video details	US	AUS	AUT	CZE	DNK	ESP	FRA	GER	HUN	IRL	ITA	SUI	SWE	UK	Certifications
The No. 1 Video Hits	Released: June 1986; Label: MusicVision (RCA/Columbia Pictures Home Video)/Pioneer Artists; Formats: VHS, Laserdisc	1	―	―	―	―	―	―	―	―	―	―	―	―	―	US: Platinum
Whitney: The Greatest Hits	Released: May 16, 2000; Label: Arista; Formats: VHS, DVD	1	9	8	―	4	11	2	6	―	1	4	―	1	4	US: Platinum; ARG: Platinum; AUS: Platinum; BRA: Platinum; ESP: Gold; UK: Gold
Artist Collection: Whitney Houston	Released: September 25, 2004; Label: Sony BMG / Arista (#82876638779); Format: DVD	―	―	―	―	―	―	―	―	―	―	―	―	―	―	
The Ultimate Collection	Released: October 29, 2007; Label: Sony Music / Arista; Format: DVD	―	1	3	10	1	―	7	10	1	7	―	3	1	―	AUS: 4× Platinum
"—" denotes items which were not released in that country or failed to chart.

=== Concert videos ===
title	Video details	Certifications	Note(s)
Welcome Home Heroes with Whitney Houston: Live in Concert	Released: May 24, 1991; Label: Arista / 6 West Home Video, Pioneer Artists; Formats: VHS, Laserdisc, DVD	US: Gold	Contains Houston's first ever solo televised concert for the troops, their families, and military and government dignitaries in honor of those returning from the Persian Gulf War, filmed at the Naval Air Station in Norfolk, Virginia on March 31, 1991.; Only the US video/LD have the full clips of the concert, originally broadcast live on HBO, including the opening performance of "The Star Spangled Banner" and "The Battle Hymn of the Republic" as an encore.; Since 1991, all releases for the concert outside the US, titled Live in Concert (official release) or several other names such as A Song for You: Live and Whitney Houston Live (which were issued by a few minor labels), don't includes the above-mentioned performances with an 80-minute running time or less, shorter than the original 96-minute edition.

=== As featured artist ===
title	Video details	Certifications	Note(s)
Grammy's Greatest Moments, Volume II	Released: February 9, 1994; Label: A*Vision Entertainment; Formats: VHS, LD		The video/LD features Houston performing live "One Moment in Time" during the 31st Grammy Awards, held at the Shrine Auditorium on February 22, 1989.
VH1 Divas Live/99	Released: November 16, 1999 (VHS)/ April 4, 2000 (DVD); Label: Image Entertainment; Formats: VHS, DVD	US: Gold; AUS: Gold	Recorded at the Beacon Theatre on April 13, 1999. Houston performed five songs at the night, but only three performances of which, "Ain't No Way" (duet with Mary J. Blige), "I Will Always Love You", and "I'm Every Woman" (with Chaka Khan), were released on the VHS and DVD. Faith Hill, Brandy, LeAnn Rimes and Blige joins the finale of the concert, "I'm Every Woman" (reprise).
25 Years of No. 1 Hits: Arista Records 25th Anniversary Celebration	Released: June 6, 2000; Label: Arista; Formats: VHS, DVD		Recorded at the Shrine Auditorium on April 10, 2000. The video/DVD includes Houston's medley performances: "I Wanna Dance With Somebody (Who Loves Me)", "How Will I Know", "I Believe In You And Me", "I Will Always Love You", and "My Love Is Your Love" (along with Monica, Deborah Cox, Angie Stone, Faith Evans, and Bobby Brown).; The video debuted at number two, its peak position, on the Billboard Top Music Videos, the chart dated July 1, 2000.

=== Unofficial concert videos ===
title	Video details	Note(s)
Whitney Houston Live	Released: October 22, 2007; Label: Falcon Neue Medien; Format: DVD	A 10-track-edited version of Welcome Home Heroes with Whitney Houston: Live in Concert, which was released by a German minor label and has only a running time of 64 minutes without the performances of "Saving All My Love for You" and "I'm Your Baby Tonight" as well as the opening and encore.
A Song for You: Live	Released: December 18, 2007; Label: Immortal; Format: DVD	An accompanying DVD of the same name CD released by Immortal, an independent music and DVD publishing company in the Netherlands, which is a re-titled release with the same track list of Whitney Houston Live mentioned above. The cover is one of photos during the promotion of Whitney: The Greatest Hits album.
Whitney Houston Live	Released: February 12, 2008; Label: Hudson Street; Format: DVD	Another Welcome Home Heroes footage DVD released by a US minor label. The DVD features poor-quality and edited footage like all the previous releases for the concert issued by minor labels. The cover is from Houston's 2004 Russia concert.
Concert for South Africa	Released: June 24, 2010; Label: Immortal; Format: DVD	An accompanying DVD of the same name CD, which is an edited version of Whitney: The Concert for a New South Africa, Houston's second HBO-televised-concert at the Ellis Park Stadium in Johannesburg on November 12, 1994. Among the original setlist, "Queen of the Night" performance is omitted.

== Video singles ==
title	Video details	Certifications	Note(s)
"The Star Spangled Banner"	Released: February 8, 1991; Label: Arista / 6 West Home Video; Format: VHS	US: 2× Multi-Platinum	A video single featuring Houston's performance for the US national anthem ceremony at Super Bowl XXV on January 27, 1991 with running time 4 minutes 30 seconds.; Whitney Houston, The Whitney Houston Foundation for Children, Inc., Arista Records and BMG Distribution donated their royalties and profits from the sale of the video to the American Red Cross Gulf Crisis Fund to benefit US military families.
"Fine"	Released: November 21, 2000; Label: Arista; Format: DVD		A DVD single contains promotional music videos of "Fine" and "If I Told You That". As a bonus, the disc includes a short documentary on the making of the "Fine" video.
"Try It on My Own"	Released: May 20, 2003; Label: Arista; Format: DVD	US: Gold	A DVD single featuring the videos for "Try It on My Own" and "One of Those Days". Also includes behind-the-scenes footage and a photo gallery.

== See also ==
- Whitney Houston albums discography
- Whitney Houston singles discography
- List of number-one hits (United States)
- List of best-selling music artists
