= Vita (rapper) =

American rapper (born 1976)

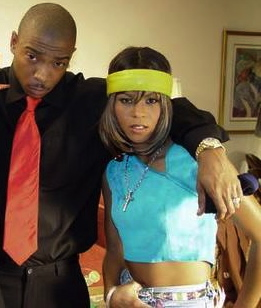
- Vita with Ja Rule on the set of the music video for Ashanti's Foolish, 2002.

Background information
- Born: LaVita Gwendolyn Raynor; January 27, 1976 (age 50); Plainfield, New Jersey, U.S.
- Genres: East Coast hip-hop; Gangsta rap
- Occupations: Rapper; songwriter; actress
- Years active: 1998–present
- Labels: Bryan Kirkland Management; Murder Inc.

LaVita Gwendolyn Raynor (born January 27, 1976), known simply as Vita, is an American rapper and actress. Raynor is perhaps best known for her role as Kionna, the mistress of Tommy "Buns" Bundy (portrayed by DMX), in the 1998 crime drama film Belly. As a rapper, Raynor is known for her appearances on the songs "Lapdance" by N.E.R.D., "Put It on Me" by Ja Rule, and "Down 4 U" by Irv Gotti. In 2014, Raynor was included in Billboard's list of the "31 Female Rappers Who Changed Hip-Hop".

== Biography ==
=== Career ===
Raynor had a minor role in the 1998 crime drama film Belly as 16-year-old girl Kionna (who is one of Tommy "Buns" Bundy's girlfriends). In the same year, Raynor also appeared in the video of the song "Break Ups 2 Make Ups" by Method Man and D'Angelo, playing the former's girlfriend. By 2000, Raynor was signed to Irv Gotti's Murder Inc. In 2001, Raynor appeared on the hook of “The Learning (Burn),” the first single released from the Mobb Deep album Infamy. Raynor contributed vocals and appeared in the official music video for the remix to Ja Rule's "Holla Holla", and made a cameo appearance in the video for Ja Rule's "6 Feet Underground". In 2002, Raynor contributed to the Irv Gotti-produced hit single "Down 4 U" with Ja Rule, Ashanti, and Charli Baltimore from the Murder Inc. compilation album Irv Gotti Presents: The Inc.. The song was another hit for Vita, peaking within the top ten on the Billboard Hot 100.

In July 2002, Vita parted ways with Irv Gotti and Murder Inc. Consequently, Vita's debut album on Murder Inc., La Dolce Vita, which was originally scheduled to be released on December 11, 2001 then delayed to Fall 2002, was ultimately shelved. With the first single "Justify My Love" not gaining attention, Madonna shut her down from making her re-make original, as she recorded a version with her rapping, but Madonna did not clear the version with the rap. Her debut album was later released on DatPiff. Raynor made a comeback in 2012 with the mixtape, Pre-cumm, a title given for "pure shock value"; she has also worked on producing a lingerie line.

=== Personal life ===
Raynor is the younger sister of singer Kima Raynor.

== Discography ==
=== Mixtapes ===
Title	Album details
Pre-cumm	Released: May 8, 2012; Format: Digital download

=== Miscellaneous ===
List of miscellaneous albums, with selected information
Title	Album details	Notes
La Dolce Vita	Released: 2002 (Shelved); Label: Murder Inc., Def Jam	

=== Singles ===
==== As lead artist ====
List of singles as lead artist, with selected chart positions, showing year released and album name
Title	Year	Peak chart positions										Album
Title	Year	US	US R&B /HH	US Rap	GER	IRE	NLD	NZ	SCO	SWI	UK	Album
"Vita, Vita, Vita"	2000	—	—	43	—	—	—	—	—	—	—	Irv Gotti Presents: The Murderers
"Down 4 U" (Irv Gotti presents Ja Rule, Ashanti, Charli Baltimore, and Vita)	2002	6	3	3	54	22	22	23	14	43	4	Irv Gotti Presents: The Inc.
"Hold That"	2022	—	—	—	—	—	—	—	—	—	—	—N/a
"Water Falls"	2022	—	—	—	—	—	—	—	—	—	—	—N/a
"Can't Nobody"	2022	—	—	—	—	—	—	—	—	—	—	—N/a

==== As featured artist ====
List of singles as featured artist, with selected chart positions, showing year released, certifications and album name
Title	Year	Peak chart positions									Certifications	Album
Title	Year	US	US R&B /HH	US Rap	NLD	NZ	SCO	SWE	SWI	UK	Certifications	Album
"Put It on Me" (Ja Rule featuring Lil' Mo and Vita)	2000	8	2	11	7	—	—	—	—	—	BPI: Silver; RMNZ: Platinum	The Fast and the Furious: Original Motion Picture Soundtrack
"Goodlife" (Funkmaster Flex presents Faith Evans featuring Ja Rule, Vita)	2001	—	42	34	—	—	—	—	—	—		The Fast and the Furious: Original Motion Picture Soundtrack
"Lapdance" (N*E*R*D featuring Lee Harvey and Vita)	2001	—	85	29	56	—	43	47	—	33	BPI: Silver	Kiss of the Dragon OST and In Search of...
"Rock Em" (Boobakaw & the Wild Younginz featuring Vita)	2001	—	81	4	—	—	—	—	—	—		—N/a
"Burn" (Mobb Deep featuring Vita and Big Noyd)	2001	99	56	14	—	—	—	—	—	—		Infamy
"Distraction" (Kima featuring Vita)	2016	—	—	—	—	—	—	—	—	—		—N/a
"Guerrilla" (CHG featuring Vita)	2017	—	—	—	—	—	—	—	—	—		Lifestyle
"Murda Babe" (CHG featuring Vita)	2017	—	—	—	—	—	—	—	—	—		Lifestyle

=== Promotional singles ===
List of promotional singles, showing year released and album name
Title	Year	Album
"Pop, Pop, Pop" (featuring Black Child, Tah Murdah And Wiz Dinero)	2001	—N/a
"Justify My Love" (featuring Ashanti)	2001	The Fast and the Furious: Original Motion Picture Soundtrack

=== Guest appearances ===
List of non-single guest appearances, with other performing artists, showing year released and album name
Title	Year	Other artist(s)	Album	Ref.
"Two Sides"	1998	—N/a	Belly (Original Motion Picture Soundtrack)	
"Dem Niggaz"	2000	Ja Rule, Black Child, Tah Murdah	Irv Gotti Presents: The Murderers	
"We Don't Give a Fuck"	2000	Ja Rule, Black Child, Tah Murdah	Irv Gotti Presents: The Murderers	
"Shit Gets Ugly"	2000	Ja Rule, Black Child, Tah Murdah	Irv Gotti Presents: The Murderers	
"We Murderers Baby"	2000	Ja Rule	Irv Gotti Presents: The Murderers	
"Interview With Vita" (Skit)	2000	—N/a	Irv Gotti Presents: The Murderers	
"Rebels Symphony"	2000	Ja Rule, Tah Murdah, O-1, BJ, Black Child	Irv Gotti Presents: The Murderers	
"Holla Holla (Remix)"	2000	Ja Rule, Jay-Z, Black Child, Tah Murdah, Memphis Bleek, Busta Rhymes	Irv Gotti Presents: The Murderers	
"Big Momma's Theme"	2000	Da Brat, Destiny’s Child	Big Momma's House: Music from the Motion Picture	
"Put It on Me"	2000	Ja Rule	Rule 3:36	
"Furious"	2001	Ja Rule, O1	The Fast and the Furious: Original Motion Picture Soundtrack	
"Justify My Love"	2001	Ashanti	The Fast and the Furious: Original Motion Picture Soundtrack	
"Here We Come"	2002	Irv Gotti, Ronnie Bumps	Irv Gotti Presents: The Inc.	
"Walk a Mile"	2002	Shade Sheist, Barbara Wilson, Nate Dogg, N.U.N.E.	Informal Introduction	
"We Fly"	2003	DJ Envy, Ja Rule, Lil' Mo	The Desert Storm Mixtape: Blok Party, Vol. 1	
"Seven Deadly Sins"	2003	DJ Kay Slay, Angie Martinez, Duchess, Lady May, Amil, Sonja Blade, Remy Martin	The Streetsweeper, Vol. 1	
"Shimmy Slide"	2010	Dame Grease, Tanya T6	Dame Grease Presents the Wave Series Vol. 6	
"Keep Investing in Yourself"	2025	Christenelle Diroc, Jadakiss, Tim Hardaway Sr	The Cancer They Found 722	

== Filmography ==
Year	Title	Role
1998	Belly	Kionna
2005	Blue Sombrero	Angelina
