= The Diary (You Think You Know) =

Studio album by Charli Baltimore
- Released: 2003 (intended)
- Recorded: 2001–2003
- Genre: Hip hop, Gangsta rap
- Label: Murder Inc.; Def Jam
- Producer: Irv Gotti, 7 Aurelius, Tru Stylze, Chink Santana, Scott Storch

Charli Baltimore chronology
Cold as Ice (1999)	The Diary (You Think You Know) (Unreleased)	True Lies (2012)

The Diary (You Think You Know) is the second unreleased studio album by American rapper Charli Baltimore. The album was to be her official solo debut album (after the cancellation of her other album, Cold as Ice), it was also expected to be Charli's big comeback. The album spawned a total of five buzz singles but none of them managed to chart. Because of the lack of charting performance from her singles and with no promotion from her label, the album was shelved.

== Background and recording ==
After striking a deal with Murder Inc. CEO Irv Gotti, Charli Baltimore began recording the album in 2001 under the label. Most of the material from the album was recorded in Soundtrack Studios, Manhattan, New York City, New York.

During recording sessions, former label-mates claimed that Charli would have numerous songs completed and the quantity of them would be more than what producers, Irv Gotti and Chink Santana would have instrumental beats finished for her. At one point, a power outage occurred at the studio, where she and producers were working at, and shortly after the incident was resolved, Charli had recorded a total of 12 songs within that same night.

In 2002, it was revealed that she had named her album, The Diary; she had confirmed it was inspired by Diary. Charli briefly explained to MTV in a 2002 interview about the concept of the album:

I wanted to bring a whole new flavor to female rapping, like nothing that's ever been done, nothing that people would expect, but keep in the whole theme of The Diary — 'You think you know but you have no idea'.

== Singles ==
The album spawned five buzz singles in hopes of creating buzz for the album:

- "No One Does It Better", featuring former labelmate, Ashanti, was released in June 2002 as the first buzz single for the album. Though it failed to chart, it was included on her home label's second compilation, Irv Gotti Presents: The Inc..
- "The Diary" was released as a b-side to "No One Does It Better". The single was released to radio stations during the summer of 2002. Promotional radio copies of the song were released at that time but because of lack of charting performance, the song was cancelled as a lead single for the album. A year following the single's limited release, it garnered a 2003 Grammy Award Nomination for Best Female Rap Solo Performance.
- "Hey Charli" was released in late August 2002 as another buzz single and was reported by MTV to be the lead single off the album and was scheduled to shoot a music video for the song but due to undisclosed reasons the video was cancelled and the song was pulled from radio airwaves and markets.
- "Philly's Finest", featuring Eve, is another buzz single from the album. It was released in late 2002; the song gained positive reception from the public and was heavily added to numerous mixtapes, however because of lack of radio airplay and still no sign of a charting position, the song was never chosen as an official single.
- "Charli, Charli" is the final buzz single from the album. After the failed attempts of her previous singles, this song was slated to be the official second single from the album. The song was scheduled to be released sometime in early 2003, however due to undisclosed reasons, Charli left her label, thus the song was never properly released. Shortly after the song's cancellation, it was leaked to several mixtapes and rare unauthorized promotional vinyl copies of the song were released.

== Release dates ==
The album was originally slated to be released on September 10, 2002, however the cancellation of her single, "Hey Charli" pushed the album back to October 22, 2002. Shortly after the release of Charli's former home label, Murder Inc.'s compilation, Irv Gotti Presents: The Remixes, it was revealed via the album, and briefly reported by MTV, that The Diary would be released on December 3, 2002. Following the announcement, more buzz singles from the album were released but failed to chart, thus her label pushed the album to a release sometime in the Summer of 2003. Months prior to the release of her album, Charli was slated to release her next single, "Charli, Charli", however due to undisclosed reasons the single was cancelled, Charli left the label and the album was shelved.

== Track listing ==
No.	Title	Length
1.	"Intro"
2.	"Hey Charli"
3.	"Diary"
4.	"Get It Right" (feat. Cadillac Tah)
5.	"Days Like This"
6.	"Angel Dust '03"
7.	"Charli, Charli"
8.	"Make You Mine" (featuring Ashanti)
9.	"Philly's Finest" (featuring Eve)
10.	"Still Waiting" (featuring Pink)
11.	"No One Does It Better" (featuring Ashanti)
12.	"Murderous Bitch" (featuring Vita)
13.	"Ghetto Fabulous" (featuring Jewell)
14.	"Showdown" (featuring Cadillac Tah, Black Child and D.O. Cannon)
15.	"Get at Me Dawg"
16.	"You Want Me Dead"
17.	"Ill Bitch"
18.	"Niggas Ain't Shit" (featuring Quarter and Nina)
19.	"Outro"

=== Notes ===
- "Angel Dust '03" was originally recorded in 2001 but was re-recorded two times due to constant pushback dates for the album; the track is also noted as a freestyle and a continuation of her 1999 song, "Angel Dust", which was included on her shelved album, Cold as Ice.
- "Charli, Charli" was originally previously released on the 2000 movie soundtrack, Bamboozled, but was re-released as the final buzz single from the Diary in 2003; it is unclear if the song was ever re-recorded during the album's recording process.
- "Get at Me Dawg" is a freestyle from the album which was released to numerous mixtapes (notably the mini-mixtape series, Street Wars), and was a diss to her label's rivalry rap gang, G-Unit.
