= Whitney: The Greatest Hits =

Compilation album by Whitney Houston
- Released: May 8, 2000
- Recorded: 1983 – March 2000
- Studios: The Aquarium (London); Chartmaker (Malibu); Crossway (Mendham); Elumba (Los Angeles); Encore (Los Angeles); Enterprise (Burbank); The Hit Factory (New York City); Hit Factory Criteria (Miami); LaCoCo (Atlanta); Larrabee (Los Angeles); Ocean Way (Los Angeles); Record Plant (Los Angeles); Signet (Los Angeles); Sony (Los Angeles); Soulpower (Los Angeles); Sound Studio N (Cologne); The Studio (Philadelphia); Summa (Los Angeles); Tarpan (San Rafael)
- Genres: Pop; R&B; dance
- Length: 2:35:47
- Label: Arista
- Producers: Clive Davis; Whitney Houston; Babyface; Clivillés and Cole; Tony Coluccio; Shep Crawford; Jerry Duplessis; David Foster; Hex Hector; Jermaine Jackson; Wyclef Jean; Jellybean; Rodney Jerkins; Kashif; Tom Keane; Stephen Lipson; CJ Mackintosh; Michael Masser; David Morales; Erick Morillo; José Nuñez; Jonathan Peters; Q-Tip; Mac Quayle; Brian Rawling; Peter Rauhofer; L.A. Reid; Harry Romero; Raphael Saadiq; Daryl Simmons; Soulshock and Karlin; Mark Taylor; Thunderpuss; Junior Vasquez; Narada Michael Walden; Mervyn Warren

Whitney Houston chronology
My Love Is Your Love (1998)	Whitney: The Greatest Hits (2000)	Love, Whitney (2001)

Singles from Whitney: The Greatest Hits
- 1. "Same Script, Different Cast" Released: May 2, 2000; 2. "Could I Have This Kiss Forever" Released: May 15, 2000; 3. "If I Told You That" Released: May 29, 2000; 4. "Fine" Released: September 19, 2000

The Essential Whitney Houston
- International reissue cover (Note: used for Australian, Asian, European and South African pressings; Canadian and Mexican editions cover features the title at the top and in a different typeface)

Whitney: The Greatest Hits is the first compilation album by American singer Whitney Houston. It was released on May 8, 2000, by Arista Records. Anticipation over a greatest hits album from Houston arose as early as 1995, when Billboard first announced the album's release. However, it was continuously postponed as Houston focused on film projects, before deciding to record several new tracks for the belated collection in 1998. The effort was quickly expanded into her fourth studio album My Love Is Your Love, released in November 1998 to widespread success, which effectively postponed Whitney: The Greatest Hits again.

A two-disc collection, Whitney: The Greatest Hits comprises Houston's ballads on its first disc, titled Cool Down, while replacing most of the original versions of her up-tempo hits with corresponding dance remixes on the second disc, titled Throw Down. Therefore, numerous publications rejected the compilation's classification as a greatest hits album, despite its title and marketing. Whitney: The Greatest Hits also includes four previously unreleased tracks—"Same Script, Different Cast", a duet with Deborah Cox; "Could I Have This Kiss Forever", a duet with Enrique Iglesias; "If I Told You That", a duet with George Michael; and "Fine"—all of which were released as singles to varying levels of success.

Whitney: The Greatest Hits was met with mixed responses from music critics, who praised Houston for her expansive catalog and career longevity, but criticized the album's inclusion of remixes rather than original versions for a majority of Houston's hits; the new tracks elicited polarity among reviewers. A commercial success, Whitney: The Greatest Hits debuted at number five on the US Billboard 200, with first-week sales of 158,000 units, and reached the top 10 in 20 additional countries. By February 2012, it had sold over 10 million copies worldwide. That June, Recording Industry Association of America (RIAA) certified the compilation quintuple platinum for double-disc shipments of 2.5 million units in the US.

Although Houston did not promote Whitney: The Greatest Hits as extensively as her previous albums, she embarked on a four-date concert residency from June to November 2000. Furthermore, the compilation was accompanied by the simultaneously released video collection of the same title. In January 2011, Legacy Recordings reissued the album as a part of their Essential album series, retitling it The Essential Whitney Houston. Following Houston's death on February 11, 2012, Whitney: The Greatest Hits registered a significant resurgence of sales, attaining a new peak of number two on the Billboard 200, and new top-10 peaks—either in its original format, or as The Essential Whitney Houston—in numerous countries worldwide.

== Background and development ==
In November 1995, Houston's song "Exhale (Shoop Shoop)"—the lead single from the soundtrack for the 1995 film Waiting to Exhale, starring Houston in a leading role—became the third song in history to debut atop the US Billboard Hot 100. It became Houston's 11th and final number-one single on the chart; with 11 singles, Houston is sixth among artists with most Billboard Hot 100 number-ones of all time, as of 2023. Furthermore, "Exhale (Shoop Shoop)" contributed to Houston becoming the best-selling physical singles female artist in the history of the Recording Industry Association of America (RIAA). In August 1995, Billboard disclosed Houston's first greatest hits album would be released on October 10, which ultimately did not come to fruition. The publication referred to the "long-promised" album again in July 1996, announcing it for that fall. After the release was postponed again, speculation on its timing continued into 1997, with Houston commenting: "Oh, Clive is on my case about this greatest hits album. He's like, Whitney, we have to do a greatest hits album, I mean you're far long overdue."

Intent on releasing the highly anticipated collection, Houston began recording new material, originally intended for a greatest hits album which would include several new tracks, in August 1998. However, she and Clive Davis soon decided to reconstruct the project into Houston's fourth studio album, titled My Love Is Your Love, her first such effort in eight years. Houston finished recording My Love Is Your Love within six weeks; it was released on November 17. Although it debuted only at number 13 on the US Billboard 200 due to strong competition from a multitude of established artists who released their new albums the same week, My Love Is Your Love went on to be certified quadruple platinum by the RIAA and produced three consecutive Billboard Hot 100 top-five hits—"Heartbreak Hotel", "It's Not Right but It's Okay" and the title track. Despite her immense commercial success during the extensive promotional cycle for My Love Is Your Love, Houston's "erratic" behavior overshadowed her professional endeavors, as she became notorious for numerous live performance cancellations and alleged drug use. (Note: attributed to multiple sources)

== New material ==
In addition to Houston's prior hits, including all of her 11 US Billboard Hot 100 number-one singles—either in their original or remixed forms—Whitney: The Greatest Hits included two newly recorded songs and two re-recordings. Shep Crawford-written and produced "Same Script, Different Cast" is a duet with Deborah Cox, which sees Houston portraying a former lover of Cox's current partner, and warning Cox of his deceitful and disregarding demeanor. The harp string and piano-driven ballad is built upon a sample of Ludwig van Beethoven's "Für Elise", and is infused with "dramatic" key changes. A multitude of critics have compared the song to Brandy and Monica's 1998 duet "The Boy Is Mine". Raphael Saadiq and Q-Tip wrote and produced "Fine", a "sultry, soulful" track arranged with "languid retro-funk" guitars.

"Could I Have This Kiss Forever", a duet with Enrique Iglesias, is a classical guitar-driven mid-tempo Latin pop ballad. The song was originally recorded for Iglesias' English-language debut Enrique (1999), and was subsequently re-recorded—and remixed by Brian Rawling and Mark Taylor—for inclusion on Whitney: The Greatest Hits. In March 2000, Houston re-recorded "If I Told You That", originally included on My Love Is Your Love, as a duet with George Michael. Rodney Jerkins, who produced the original version, reprised his role for the re-recording. In an interview for MTV News at the 42nd Annual Grammy Awards (2000), Jerkins revealed that Michael Jackson was the initial choice for the duet but could not schedule recording with Houston. Lyrically, the track discusses its protagonist's contemplations of confessing romantic feelings to a friend.

"Same Script, Different Cast" and "Could I Have This Kiss Forever" appear at the end the album's first disc, titled Cool Down, which comprises R&B, pop and, to a lesser extent, gospel ballads. "Fine" and "If I Told You That" follow at the start of the second disc, titled Throw Down, which comprises up-tempo dance tracks, encompassing hi-NRG and house-influenced remixes of Houston's prior hits. Whitney: The Greatest Hits also includes several tracks which, although released, had never been included on any of Houston's albums. "If You Say My Eyes Are Beautiful", Houston's duet with Jermaine Jackson which had previously solely appeared on Jackson's 1986 album Precious Moments, appears on Cool Down. Houston's 1988 Summer Olympics tribute and top-five hit "One Moment in Time" was included on the North American edition of Throw Down and the international edition of Cool Down. North American edition of Throw Down also includes Houston's 1991 performance of "The Star-Spangled Banner" at Super Bowl XXV.

== Marketing ==
=== Title and packaging ===
Despite its title and being marketed as such, Whitney: The Greatest Hits is not a greatest hits album. (Note: While announcing the release of Houston's posthumous greatest hits album I Will Always Love You: The Best of Whitney Houston in August 2012, Keith Caulfield from Billboard declared it Houston's "first authoritative greatest hits album" and referred to Whitney: The Greatest Hits as a compilation album due to its remix-infused track listing. Numerous other journalists had also classified Whitney: The Greatest Hits as a compilation rather than a greatest hits album.) David LaChapelle photographed the album's cover artwork and booklet imagery. The cover depicts Houston standing on a ladder and smiling as she holds a drill in order to hang her certified records on the wall. On the contrary, critic David Quantick interpreted the artwork as Houston using the drill to destroy the records. Following Houston's death in February 2012, LaChapelle revealed that Houston arrived to the photo shoot six hours late and under the influence of cocaine, which caused him difficulties with photographing her during the 15-hour session.

For its 2011 reissue, Whitney: The Greatest Hits was retitled The Essential Whitney Houston, as it was integrated into Legacy Recordings' The Essential album series. Chapelle's cover artwork was replaced by a monochrome portrait of Houston, photographed by Randee St. Nicholas in 1992 to promote The Bodyguard; however, the liner notes and accompanying imagery remained unchanged.

=== Release and promotion ===
After numerous delays, Davis announced the release of Whitney: The Greatest Hits via MTV News in February 2000. In the US, the album was released on May 16, 2000, by Arista Records. Its release was preceded by the limited-edition four-record vinyl box set Whitney: The Unreleased Mixes on April 25; the set included eight previously unreleased extended dance remixes of Houston's prior singles, some of which appeared on the North American edition second disc of Whitney: The Greatest Hits. Exclusively at Circuit City, Whitney: The Greatest Hits was released with a bonus disc including two extended club mixes. Internationally, the compilation was released on May 8 in Australia, and on May 15 in most countries. While its North American edition featured almost exclusively remixes on its second disc, international editions replaced most of them with corresponding original versions.

A video album of the same title was released simultaneously with Whitney: The Greatest Hits worldwide, comprising 23 of Houston's music videos, as well as select live performances, interviews with Houston and Davis, and behind-the-scenes footage. The DVD was noted for its interactive features, which saw Houston introducing its segments and providing commentary; it was one of the first video albums ever to incorporate interactive components. In contrast to Houston's previous releases, Whitney: The Greatest Hits was not promoted with televised performances and appearances. However, Houston did perform a 20-minute medley at Arista's 25th anniversary celebration in Los Angeles on April 10, 2000; the concert aired on NBC on May 15. She subsequently embarked on a three-date concert residency at Caesars Atlantic City from June 30 to July 3, and performed an additional show at the Aladdin Theatre for the Performing Arts in Las Vegas on November 10, with then-husband Bobby Brown as the opening act.

=== Singles ===
The selection and order of singles from Whitney: The Greatest Hits substantially differed depending on region. In France, "I Learned from the Best"—the fifth and final single from My Love Is Your Love—was released ahead of Whitney: The Greatest Hits, on April 18, 2000, peaking at number 44. In the US, "Same Script, Different Cast" and "Could I Have This Kiss Forever" were both released as lead singles from Whitney: The Greatest Hits—the former was serviced to urban contemporary radio on May 2, while the latter was serviced to adult contemporary, rhythmic contemporary and contemporary hit radios two weeks later. "Same Script, Different Cast" peaked at number 70 on the US Billboard Hot 100, becoming Houston's lowest-peaking lead single at the time, but became her fourth Adult R&B Songs number-one single. While "Could I Have This Kiss Forever" peaked only at number 52 on the US Billboard Hot 100, it peaked atop the European Hot 100 Singles and charts in Croatia, the Netherlands, Poland, and Switzerland, after being released as the second European single from Whitney: The Greatest Hits on July 25. Furthermore, the song attained top 10 positions in 13 additional countries, including Canada, New Zealand, and the UK. The song's accompanying music video was directed by Francis Lawrence.

In Europe, "If I Told You That" was released as the lead single from Whitney: The Greatest Hits on May 29, 2000; in the US, it was released as an airplay-only fourth and final single on January 30, 2001. It reached the summit in Croatia, Iceland, and Poland, and the top 10 in the Czech Republic, Italy, and the UK. The music video for "If I Told You That" was directed by Kevin Bray. "Fine" was released as the third US single from Whitney: The Greatest Hits on September 19, 2000, peaking at number 51 on the US Hot R&B/Hip-Hop Songs. In Sweden, it was released as the third and final single on December 11, peaking at number 50. The music video for "Fine" was Houston's second consecutive to be directed by Bray. In select European countries, "Heartbreak Hotel"—originally the second single from My Love Is Your Love—was released as the third and final single from Whitney: The Greatest Hits on December 18, 2000, peaking at number 25 in the UK.

== Critical reception ==
Professional ratings
Review scores
Source	Rating
AllMusic	(Note: Both Whitney: The Greatest Hits and The Essential Whitney Houston received four out of five stars.)
The Atlanta Journal-Constitution	B+
The Baltimore Sun	2.5/5 stars
Entertainment Weekly	C+
The Guardian	3/5 stars
New York Daily News	(Note: In his review of Whitney: The Greatest Hits for New York Daily News, Jim Farber gave Cool Down two stars, and Throw Down three, thus the album's overall grade averaged two and a half stars.)
Newsweek	4/5 stars
NME	2.5/5 stars
Q	2/5 stars
USA Today	4/5 stars

On release, Whitney: The Greatest Hits was met with mixed to positive reviews from music critics. Steve Huey from AllMusic expressed dissatisfaction with the inclusion of remixes instead of the original versions on Throw Down, writing that Whitney: The Greatest Hits "amply reinforces once again what a fine singles artist Houston has been for the entirety of her career. Still and all, though, it's a frustrating package marred by record company greed". Sonia Murray from The Atlanta Journal-Constitution praised the album, elaborating: "What makes Whitney Houston's first collection of hits great is her. On the first CD there's her masterfully manipulated big pop confections ('I Will Always Love You'), the occasional, really soulful R&B tunes ('Saving All My Love for You') and new radio-ready duets with Whitney-in-training Deborah Cox and Latin smolderer Enrique Iglesias. The second CD of dance remixes is an appropriate nod to an artist who has held sway over so many genres." Billboard editor Michael Paoletta called Whitney: The Greatest Hits "[q]uite the stellar collection", while Jane Stevenson from Canoe.com labeled it "a greatest hits package that makes good listening sense". Writing for Ebony, Lynn Norment stated that the album "reminds listeners of the enormous talent this artist demonstrated on 'You Give Good Love', how she has grown, and the fact she has a long career road ahead", and highlighted its previously unreleased duets. Christine Galera of Orlando Sentinel commended Houston's vocal performances on Whitney: The Greatest Hits and praised "Same Script, Different Cast", but criticized the album's length and the inclusion of "mellow" singles from Waiting to Exhale.

In a positive review for The Guardian, Caroline Sullivan favored Throw Down over its counterpart Cool Down, as did Entertainment Weekly's Ken Tucker, who nonetheless criticized the inclusion of remixes on Whitney: The Greatest Hits due to its title and, by extension, the album's track listing as a whole. Jim Farber of the New York Daily News described Whitney: The Greatest Hits as a "bipolar affair set between two CDs, one of which recycles Houston's boring old ballads", while Throw Down "isn't just an ecstatic piece of party music – it utterly redefines Houston as an artist." Writing less favorably for The Baltimore Sun, J. D. Considine dismissed the title of Whitney: The Greatest Hits as "false advertising", and criticized the new tracks—excluding "Fine", which he singled out as a highlight. NME lambasted the timing of the album's release, in reference to Houston's personal and professional struggles at the time, elaborating: "Issuing a double CD of Whitney Houston's finest moments was intended to shore up her rapidly eroding soul diva supremacy against the rising tide of clued-up, modern successors to her throne – Missy Elliott, Lauryn Hill, Kelis. Instead, appearing among rumours of drug abuse, wobbly appearances at awards ceremonies and the recent application of round-the-clock minders to Whitney – it seems more eulogy than testimonial." Ernest Hardy of LA Weekly dismissed Whitney: The Greatest Hits as "damn near unlistenable"—he summarized Cool Down as "Whitney's voice – so strong, so assured, so boring – anchoring saccharine production and even sappier songwriting", and Throw Down as "filled with astonishingly bad dance remixes of old hits". Reviewing the video edition of Whitney: The Greatest Hits, Heather Phares praised the selection of music videos and live performances. In his review of The Essential Whitney Houston, Stephen Thomas Erlewine wrote that the reissue "plays much like The Greatest Hits; even if it has a handful of songs not on the 2000 collection, it covers the same territory equally well and equally entertainingly."

== Commercial performance ==
In the US, Whitney: The Greatest Hits sold 158,000 units within its first week, debuting at number five on the Billboard 200, and at number three on the Top R&B/Hip-Hop Albums, both dated June 3, 2000. It registered Houston's highest solo effort debut since her second studio album Whitney (1987). Whitney: The Greatest Hits descended to number nine on the Billboard 200, and number six on the Top R&B/Hip-Hop Albums, in its second week. On June 20, the album was certified double platinum by the Recording Industry Association of America (RIAA), denoting double-disc shipments of one million units in the US. Meanwhile, its accompanying video album had debuted atop the Music Video Sales chart, and went on to become one of the best-selling video albums of the year. Regardless, the album's domestic commercial performance was deemed underwhelming by Arista executives. Several factors were credited with contributing to the "uncharacteristically meager sales", including release timing, single selection, and replacement of Davis with L.A. Reid as the chief executive officer (CEO) and president of Arista. In Canada, Whitney: The Greatest Hits debuted at number four on the Canadian Albums Chart dated June 3, 2000, and was subsequently certified platinum by Music Canada for shipments of 100,000 units in the country.

In the UK, Whitney: The Greatest Hits debuted atop the UK Albums Chart and UK R&B Albums Chart, and peaked atop the Scottish Albums Chart in its second week. After spending 17 weeks within the top 10 on the UK Albums Chart, the album placed ninth on the chart's year-end issue for 2000. Whitney: The Greatest Hits also reached the summit in Ireland, where its sales earned it the 2001 Meteor Music Award for Best International Female Album. Across Europe, the compilation peaked within the top 10 in 13 additional countries, and at number two on the European Top 100 Albums. (Note: attributed to multiple sources) By the end of 2000, the International Federation of the Phonographic Industry (IFPI) had certified the album triple platinum for selling three million units in Europe. In Japan, Whitney: The Greatest Hits peaked at number four on the Oricon Albums Chart, and was certified triple platinum by the Recording Industry Association of Japan (RIAJ) for shipments of 600,000 units; it was also among the winners of the 2001 Japan Gold Disc Award for International Pop Album of the Year. The compilation was also a commercial success across Oceania, debuting at numbers eight and nine in Australia and New Zealand, respectively. By February 2012, Whitney: The Greatest Hits had sold over ten million copies worldwide.

Following Houston's death on February 11, 2012, Whitney: The Greatest Hits registered a global resurgence of sales. In the US, it re-entered the Billboard 200 at number six after selling 64,000 copies in a single day, registering a 10,419% increase in comparison to the prior week. After a full tracking week, Whitney: The Greatest Hits ascended to its new peak at number two with 175,000 units. The album remained at the position the following week, with steady sales of 174,000 copies; that week, Houston became the first female artist ever to have three albums simultaneously within Billboard 200's top 10. On June 21, Whitney: The Greatest Hits was certified quintuple platinum by the RIAA, signifying double-disc shipments of 2.5 million units in the country. Internationally, the compilation attained new peaks within the top 10 in Argentina, Australia, and France, while its reissue The Essential Whitney Houston reached the summit in Poland and South Korea, and the top 10 in Australia, Canada, Ireland, South Africa, and the UK. (Note: attributed to multiple sources)

== Track listing ==
Disc 1: Cool Down
No.	Title	Writer(s)	Producer(s)	Length
1.	"You Give Good Love"	LaLa	Kashif	4:11
2.	"Saving All My Love for You"	Michael Masser; Gerry Goffin	Masser	3:57
3.	"Greatest Love of All"	Masser; Linda Creed	Masser	4:54
4.	"All at Once"	Masser; Jeffrey Osborne	Masser	4:29
5.	"If You Say My Eyes Are Beautiful" (with Jermaine Jackson)	Elliot Willensky	Jackson; Tom Keane	4:20
6.	"Didn't We Almost Have It All"	Masser; Will Jennings	Masser	4:38
7.	"Where Do Broken Hearts Go"	Frank Wildhorn; Chuck Jackson	Narada Michael Walden	4:38
8.	"All the Man That I Need"	Dean Pitchford; Michael Gore	Walden	3:57
9.	"Run to You"	Allan Rich; Jud Friedman	David Foster	4:27
10.	"I Have Nothing"	Foster; Linda Thompson	Foster	4:53
11.	"I Will Always Love You"	Dolly Parton	Foster	4:28
12.	"Exhale (Shoop Shoop)"	Babyface	Babyface	3:25
13.	"Why Does It Hurt So Bad"	Babyface	Babyface	4:40
14.	"I Believe in You and Me"	David Wolfert; Sandy Linzer	Mervyn Warren; Whitney Houston	3:54
15.	"Heartbreak Hotel" (featuring Faith Evans and Kelly Price)	Carsten Schack; Kenneth Karlin; Tamara Savage	Soulshock and Karlin	4:06
16.	"My Love Is Your Love"	Wyclef Jean; Jerry Duplessis	Jean; Duplessis	4:19
17.	"Same Script, Different Cast" (with Deborah Cox)	Anthony Crawford; Shae Jones; Stacey Daniels; Montell Jordan	Shep Crawford	4:58
18.	"Could I Have This Kiss Forever" (Metro Mix) (with Enrique Iglesias)	Diane Warren	Foster; Brian Rawling^{[a]}; Mark Taylor^{[a]}	3:55
Total length:				78:09

International edition (Note: attributed to Australian, Brazilian, European, Japanese, South African, and Taiwanese pressings)
No.	Title	Writer(s)	Producer(s)	Length
14.	"Count on Me" (with CeCe Winans)	Babyface; W. Houston; Michael Houston	Babyface	4:27
16.	"I Learned from the Best"	Diane Warren	Foster	4:23

Disc 2: Throw Down
No.	Title	Writer(s)	Producer(s)	Length
1.	"Fine"	Raphael Saadiq; Kamaal Fareed	Saadiq; Q-Tip	3:35
2.	"If I Told You That" (with George Michael)	Rodney Jerkins; Fred Jerkins III; LaShawn Daniels; Toni Estes	R. Jerkins; Michael^{[a]}	4:33
3.	"It's Not Right but It's Okay" (Thunderpuss Mix)	R. Jerkins; F. Jerkins; Daniels; Isaac Phillips; Estes	R. Jerkins; Thunderpuss^{[a]}	4:15
4.	"My Love Is Your Love" (Jonathan Peters Mix)	Jean; Duplessis	Jean; Duplessis; Jonathan Peters^{[a]}; Tony Coluccio^{[a]}	4:18
5.	"Heartbreak Hotel" (Hex Hector Mix) (featuring Faith Evans and Kelly Price)	Schack; Karlin; Savage	Soulshock & Karlin; Hex Hector^{[a]}	4:20
6.	"I Learned from the Best" (HQ² Mix)	Warren	Foster; Hector^{[a]}; Mac Quayle^{[a]}	4:23
7.	"Step by Step" (Junior Vasquez Mix)	Annie Lennox	Stephen Lipson; Junior Vasquez^{[a]}	4:04
8.	"I'm Every Woman" (Clivilles & Cole Mix)	Nickolas Ashford; Valerie Simpson	Walden; Robert Clivillés^{[a]}; David Cole^{[a]}	4:30
9.	"Queen of the Night" (CJ Mackintosh Mix)	L.A. Reid; Babyface; W. Houston; Daryl Simmons	Reid; Babyface; W. Houston^{[b]}; Simmons^{[b]}; CJ Mackintosh^{[a]}	3:45
10.	"I Will Always Love You" (Hex Hector Mix)	Parton	Foster; Hector^{[a]}	4:48
11.	"Love Will Save the Day" (Jellybean & David Morales Mix)	Toni C.	Jellybean; David Morales^{[a]}	5:06
12.	"I'm Your Baby Tonight" (Dronez Mix)	L.A. Reid; Babyface	Reid; Babyface; Harry "Choo-Choo" Romero^{[a]}; José Nuñez^{[a]}; Erick Morillo^{[a]}	5:05
13.	"So Emotional" (David Morales Mix)	Billy Steinberg; Tom Kelly	Walden; Morales^{[a]}	3:57
14.	"I Wanna Dance with Somebody (Who Loves Me)" (Junior Vasquez Mix)	George Merrill; Shannon Rubicam	Walden; Vasquez^{[a]}	4:24
15.	"How Will I Know" (Junior Vasquez Mix)	Merrill; Rubicam; Walden	Walden; Vasquez^{[a]}	4:09
16.	"Greatest Love of All" (Junior Vasquez Mix)	Masser; Creed	Masser; Vasquez^{[a]}	5:09
17.	"One Moment in Time"	Albert Hammond; John Bettis	Walden	5:02
18.	"The Star Spangled Banner" (live at Super Bowl XXV)	Francis Scott Key		2:15
Total length:				77:38

=== Notes ===
- ^{^[a]} signifies an additional producer
- ^{^[b]} signifies a co-producer
- Circuit City-exclusive pressings include a bonus disc containing Peter Rauhofer's Club 69 mix of "Greatest Love of All" and David Morales' Emotional Club mix of "So Emotional".
- International edition disc one features an altered track order and replaces tracks 13, 15, and 16 with "One Moment in Time", "Count on Me", and "I Learned from the Best".
- International edition disc two features an altered track order and includes the original version of track 3, excludes tracks 6, 17, and 18, replaces tracks 4, 5, 7, 8, 11, and 13–15 with their original versions, and replaces track 16 with its Club 69 mix.
- Video pressings comprise 24 of Houston's music videos, including "Impossible" from Rodgers & Hammerstein's Cinderella, alongside live performances of "Home", "One Moment in Time", "Lover for Life", "Why Does It Hurt So Bad", "It's Not Right but It's Okay", and "My Love Is Your Love", and footage documenting the making of My Love Is Your Love.
- Australian and Canadian pressings of The Essential Whitney Houston use the same track listing as the North American edition of Whitney: The Greatest Hits. The international edition track listing was used in other countries.

== Personnel ==
Credits are adapted from the liner notes of Whitney: The Greatest Hits.

- Ashford & Simpson – songwriting (disc 2: track 8)
- Babyface – executive production (disc 1: tracks 12 and 13), production (disc 1: tracks 12 and 13; disc 2: tracks 9 and 12), songwriting (disc 1: tracks 12 and 13; disc 2: tracks 9 and 12)
- John Bettis – songwriting (disc 2: track 17)
- Gerry Brown – orchestra engineering (disc 2: track 1)
- Toni C. – songwriting (disc 2: track 11)
- Anne "Auntie Mae" Catalino – engineering (disc 1: track 17)
- John Clayton Jr. – arrangement (disc 2: track 18)
- Diana Clemente – project coordination (video)
- Clivillés and Cole – additional production (disc 2: track 8)
- Tony Coluccio – additional production (disc 2: track 4)
- Deborah Cox – backing vocals (disc 1: track 17), lead vocals (disc 1: track 17)
- Shep Crawford – backing vocals (disc 1: track 17), instrumentation (disc 1: track 17), production (disc 1: track 17), songwriting (disc 1: track 17), string arrangement (disc 1: track 17), vocal arrangement (disc 1: track 17)
- Linda Creed – songwriting (disc 1: track 3; disc 2: track 16)
- Ricky Crespo – additional programming (disc 2: track 8)
- LaShawn Daniels – songwriting (disc 2: tracks 2 and 3)
- Stacey Daniels – songwriting (disc 1: track 17)
- Dave Darlington – mixing (disc 2: track 12)
- Clive Davis – album production, executive production (all tracks)
- Tony Dawsey – mastering (disc 1)
- DJ Quik – mixing (disc 2: track 1)
- Jon Douglas – mixing (disc 2: track 2)
- Jerry Duplessis – production (disc 1: track 16; disc 2: track 4), songwriting (disc 1: track 16; disc 2: track 4)
- Peter Edge – A&R
- Nir Erelbaum – engineering assistance (disc 2: track 13)
- Toni Estes – songwriting (disc 2: tracks 2 and 3)
- Faith Evans – vocals (disc 1: track 15; disc 2: track 5)
- Dan Fenster – menu design (video)
- Raul Flores – engineering assistance (disc 2: track 12)
- The Florida Orchestra – orchestra (disc 2: track 18)
- Roxanna Floyd – makeup
- David Foster – arrangement (disc 1: tracks 10, 11 and 18; disc 2: tracks 6 and 10), production (disc 1: tracks 9–11 and 18; disc 2: tracks 6 and 10), songwriting (disc 1: track 10)
- Jud Friedman – songwriting (disc 1: track 9)
- Gerry Goffin – songwriting (disc 1: track 2)
- Michael Gore – songwriting (disc 1: track 8)
- Hosh Gureli – A&R
- Albert Hammond – songwriting (disc 2: track 17)
- Hex Hector – additional production (disc 2: tracks 5, 6 and 10)
- Whitney Houston – album production, executive production (disc 1: tracks 9–11 and 14–17; disc 2: track 1), production (disc 1: track 14; disc 2: track 9), songwriting (disc 2: tracks 1, 3 and 9), vocal arrangement (disc 1: tracks 6–11 and 14–17; disc 2: tracks 1, 3–7, 10, 12–14, 17 and 18), vocals (all tracks)
- Enrique Iglesias – vocals (disc 1: track 18)
- Chuck Jackson – songwriting (disc 1: track 7)
- Jermaine Jackson – production (disc 1: track 5), vocals (disc 1: track 5)
- Wyclef Jean – production (disc 1: track 16; disc 2: track 4), songwriting (disc 1: track 16; disc 2: track 4)
- Jellybean – production (disc 2: track 11)
- Will Jennings – songwriting (disc 1: track 6)
- Fred Jerkins III – songwriting (disc 2: tracks 2 and 3)
- Rodney Jerkins – instrumentation (disc 2: track 2), production (disc 2: tracks 2 and 3), songwriting (disc 2: tracks 2 and 3)
- Shae Jones – backing vocals (disc 1: track 17), songwriting (disc 1: track 17)
- Montell Jordan – songwriting (disc 1: track 17)
- Frederick Jorio – programming (disc 2: track 16)
- Kashif – arrangement (disc 1: track 1), production (disc 1: track 1)
- Tom Keane – production (disc 1: track 5)
- Tom Kelly – songwriting (disc 2: track 13)
- Francis Scott Key – songwriting (disc 2: track 18)
- David LaChapelle – photography
- LaLa – songwriting (disc 1: track 1)
- Ellin LaVar – hair
- Annie Lennox – songwriting (disc 2: track 7)
- Tom Leone – production (video)
- Ken Levy – creative direction (video)
- Amy Linden – liner notes
- Jahja Ling – conducting (disc 2: track 18)
- Sandy Linzer – songwriting (disc 1: track 14)
- Stephen Lipson – production (disc 2: track 7)
- CJ Mackintosh – additional production (disc 2: track 9)
- Joe Mardin – string arrangement (disc 1: track 17)
- Michael Masser – production (disc 1: tracks 2–4 and 6; disc 2: track 16), songwriting (disc 1: tracks 2–4 and 6; disc 2: track 16)
- Al McDowell – bass (disc 2: track 12), guitar (disc 2: track 12)
- George Merrill – songwriting (disc 2: tracks 14 and 15)
- George Michael – additional production (disc 2: track 2), vocals (disc 2: track 2)
- P. Dennis Mitchell – mix engineering (disc 2: track 7)
- Peter Mokran – mixing (disc 1: track 17)
- David Morales – additional production (disc 2: tracks 11 and 13)
- Erick Morillo – additional production (disc 2: track 12)
- Joe Moskowitz – keyboards (disc 2: track 13), programming (disc 2: tracks 7 and 14)
- Keith Naftaly – A&R
- José Nuñez – additional production (disc 2: track 12)
- Jeffrey Osborne – songwriting (disc 1: track 4)
- Dolly Parton – songwriting (disc 1: track 11; disc 2: track 10)
- Jonathan Peters – additional production (disc 2: track 4)
- Isaac Phillips – songwriting (disc 2: track 3)
- Dean Pitchford – songwriting (disc 1: track 8)
- Kelly Price – vocal arrangement (disc 1: track 17), vocals (disc 1: track 15; disc 2: track 5)
- Q-Tip – production (disc 2: track 1), songwriting (disc 2: track 1)
- Mac Quayle – additional production (disc 2: track 6), engineering (disc 2: tracks 5 and 10), keyboards (disc 2: tracks 5 and 10), programming (disc 2: tracks 5 and 10)
- Brian Rawling – additional production (disc 1: track 18), mixing (disc 1: track 18)
- L.A. Reid – production (disc 2: tracks 9 and 12), songwriting (disc 2: tracks 9 and 12)
- Allan Rich – songwriting (disc 1: track 9)
- Danny Romero – engineering (disc 2: track 1)
- Harry Romero – additional production (disc 2: track 12)
- Shannon Rubicam – songwriting (disc 2: tracks 14 and 15)
- Raphael Saadiq – orchestra arrangement (disc 2: track 1), production (disc 2: track 1), songwriting (disc 2: track 1)
- Tom Salta – programming (disc 2: track 15)
- Tamara Savage – songwriting (disc 1: track 15; disc 2: track 5)
- Jamie Seyberth – tracking (disc 1: track 17)
- Daryl Simmons – production (disc 2: track 9), songwriting (disc 2: track 9)
- Dexter Simmons – engineering (disc 2: track 2)
- Soulshock and Karlin – arrangement (disc 1: track 15; disc 2: track 5), production (disc 1: track 15; disc 2: track 5), songwriting (disc 1: track 15; disc 2: track 5)
- The South Central Chamber Orchestra – orchestra (disc 2: track 1)
- Jeff Stabenau – executive production (video)
- Jason Stasium – engineering (disc 2: track 1)
- Rachel Stein – production management
- Billy Steinberg – songwriting (disc 2: track 13)
- Christopher Stern – art direction
- David Sussman – engineering (disc 2: track 13)
- Ren Swan – mix engineering (disc 2: track 2)
- Mark Taylor – additional production (disc 1: track 18), mixing (disc 1: track 18)
- Thunderpuss – additional production (disc 2: track 3)
- Linda Thompson – songwriting (disc 1: track 10)
- Satoshi Tomiie – keyboards (disc 2: track 13)
- Lenny Underwood – keyboards (disc 2: track 12)
- Junior Vasquez – additional production (disc 2: tracks 7 and 14–16)
- Charles Veal Jr. – orchestra arrangement (disc 2: track 1), orchestra conducting (disc 2: track 1)
- Narada Michael Walden – production (disc 1: tracks 7 and 8; disc 2: tracks 8, 13–15 and 17), songwriting (disc 2: track 15)
- Diane Warren – songwriting (disc 1: track 18; disc 2: track 6)
- Mervyn Warren – production (disc 1: track 14)
- Frank Wildhorn – songwriting (disc 1: track 7)
- Elliot Willensky – songwriting (disc 1: track 5)
- Jay Williams – guitar (disc 1: track 17)
- Patti Wilson – styling
- David Wolfert – songwriting (disc 1: track 14)
- Leon Zervos – mastering (disc 2)

== Charts ==
=== Weekly charts ===
2000 weekly chart performance
Chart	Peak position
Australian Albums (ARIA)	8
Austrian Albums (Ö3 Austria)	3
Belgian Albums (Ultratop Flanders)	2
Belgian Albums (Ultratop Wallonia)	2
Canadian Albums (Billboard)	4
Danish Albums (Hitlisten)	2
Dutch Albums (Album Top 100)	2
European Top 100 Albums (Music & Media)	2
Finnish Albums (Suomen virallinen lista)	7
German Albums (Offizielle Top 100)	2
Greek International Albums (IFPI)	2
Hungarian Albums (MAHASZ)	7
Italian Albums (FIMI)	4
Irish Albums (IRMA)	1
Japanese Albums (Oricon)	4
Malaysian Albums (RIM)	8
New Zealand Albums (RMNZ)	9
Norwegian Albums (VG-lista)	6
Portuguese Albums (AFP)	13
Scottish Albums (Official Charts)	1
Spanish Albums (PROMUSICAE)	4
Swedish Albums (Sverigetopplistan)	4
Swiss Albums (Schweizer Hitparade)	2
UK Albums (Official Charts)	1
UK R&B Albums (Official Charts)	1
UK Music Videos (Official Charts)	1
US Billboard 200	5
US Top R&B/Hip-Hop Albums (Billboard)	3
US Music Video Sales (Billboard)	1

2012 weekly chart performance
Chart	Peak position
Argentine Albums (CAPIF)	9
Australian Albums (ARIA)	3
Austrian Albums (Ö3 Austria)	42
Croatian Albums (HDU)	32
Danish Albums (Hitlisten)	10
French Albums (SNEP)	9
German Albums (Offizielle Top 100)	37
New Zealand Albums (RMNZ)	18
Norwegian Albums (VG-lista)	11
Portuguese Albums (AFP)	17
Scottish Albums (OCC)	14
Swiss Albums (Schweizer Hitparade)	14
UK Albums (OCC)	7
UK R&B Albums (OCC)	2
US Billboard 200	2

2012–2019 weekly chart performance for The Essential Whitney Houston
Chart	Peak position
Australian Albums (ARIA)	7
Austrian Albums (Ö3 Austria)	26
Canadian Albums (Billboard)	3
Croatian Albums (HDU)	17
Czech Albums (ČNS IFPI)	22
Danish Albums (Hitlisten)	26
French Albums (SNEP)	51
German Albums (Offizielle Top 100)	20
Greek Albums (IFPI)	46
Irish Albums (IRMA)	7
Italian Albums (FIMI)	21
Mexican Albums (Top 100 Mexico)	16
New Zealand Albums (RMNZ)	18
Polish Albums (ZPAV)	1
South African Albums (RISA)	3
South Korean Albums (Circle)	11
South Korean International Albums (Circle)	1
Swiss Albums (Schweizer Hitparade)	15
UK Albums (Official Charts)	7
UK R&B Albums (Official Charts)	2

=== Monthly charts ===
2000 monthly chart performance
Chart	Peak position
South Korean International Albums (RIAK)	14

=== Year-end charts ===
2000 year-end chart performance
Chart	Position
Australian Albums (ARIA)	63
Austrian Albums (Ö3 Austria)	31
Belgian Albums (Ultratop Flanders)	18
Belgian Albums (Ultratop Wallonia)	10
Canadian Albums (Nielsen SoundScan)	92
Danish Albums (Hitlisten)	19
Dutch Albums (Album Top 100)	32
European Top 100 Albums (Music & Media)	9
Finnish International Albums (Suomen virallinen lista)	105
French Compilation Albums (SNEP)	2
German Albums (Offizielle Top 100)	35
Italian Albums (FIMI)	21
Japanese Albums (Oricon)	52
Swiss Albums (Schweizer Hitparade)	24
UK Albums (OCC)	9
US Billboard 200	81
US Top R&B/Hip-Hop Albums (Billboard)	77

2001 year-end chart performance
Chart	Position
Canadian R&B Albums (Nielsen SoundScan)	121
UK Albums (OCC)	111

2004 year-end chart performance
Chart	Position
UK Albums (OCC)	179

2006 year-end chart performance
Chart	Position
UK Albums (OCC)	152

2012 year-end chart performance
Chart	Position
Australian Urban Albums (ARIA)	27
US Billboard 200	18

2012 year-end chart performance for The Essential Whitney Houston
Chart	Position
Australian Urban Albums (ARIA)	20
South Korean International Albums (Circle)	37

2019 year-end chart performance for The Essential Whitney Houston
Chart	Position
Polish Albums (ZPAV)	83

=== Decade-end charts ===
2000s decade-end chart performance
Chart	Position
UK Albums (OCC)	49

=== Centurial charts ===
21st century chart performance
Chart	Position
UK Female Albums (OCC)	22

=== All-time charts ===
All-time chart performance
Chart	Position
Irish Female Albums (OCC)	24
UK Female Albums (OCC)	29

== Certifications ==
Certifications and sales
Region	Certification	Certified units/sales
Argentina (CAPIF) Video	Platinum	8,000^{^}
Australia (ARIA)	2× Platinum	140,000^{^}
Australia (ARIA) Video	Platinum	15,000^{^}
Austria (IFPI Austria)	Gold	25,000^{*}
Belgium (BRMA)	Platinum	50,000^{*}
Brazil (Pro-Música Brasil)	Gold	100,000^{*}
Brazil (Pro-Música Brasil) Video	Platinum	50,000^{*}
Canada (Music Canada)	Platinum	100,000^{^}
Denmark (IFPI Danmark)	Platinum	50,000
Finland (Musiikkituottajat)	Gold	23,109
France (SNEP)	2× Gold	200,000^{*}
Germany (BVMI)	Platinum	300,000^{^}
Japan (RIAJ)	3× Platinum	600,000^{^}
Netherlands (NVPI)	Platinum	80,000^{^}
Poland (ZPAV) Reissue	Gold	10,000^{‡}
South Korea	—	77,024
Spain (Promusicae)	Platinum	100,000^{^}
Sweden (GLF)	Platinum	80,000^{^}
Switzerland (IFPI Switzerland)	Platinum	50,000^{^}
United Kingdom (BPI)	6× Platinum	1,800,000^{*}
United Kingdom (BPI) Video	Gold	25,000^{*}
United Kingdom (BPI) Reissue	Silver	60,000^{*}
United States (RIAA)	5× Platinum	2,600,000
United States (RIAA) Video	Platinum	100,000^{^}
Summaries
Europe (IFPI)	3× Platinum	3,000,000^{*}
Worldwide	—	10,000,000
^{*} Sales figures based on certification alone.^{^} Shipments figures based on certification alone.^{‡} Sales+streaming figures based on certification alone.

== Release history ==
Release dates and formats
Region	Date	Format(s)	Label(s)	Ref.
Australia	May 8, 2000	Double CD	BMG	
France	May 15, 2000	Double CD	Arista	
Germany	May 15, 2000	Double CD	BMG	
Sweden	May 15, 2000	Double CD	BMG	
United Kingdom	May 15, 2000	Cassette; double CD	Arista	
United States	May 16, 2000	Box set (Note: exclusive to Circuit City); cassette; double CD; DVD; VHS	Arista	
South Korea	May 18, 2000	Cassette; double CD	BMG	
Japan	May 20, 2000	Double CD	Arista	
United Kingdom	May 20, 2000	DVD	Arista	
Germany	May 22, 2000	DVD; VHS	BMG	
France	June 14, 2000	VHS	Arista	
France	June 19, 2000	DVD	Arista	
Japan	July 7, 2000	DVD	Arista	
Australia	July 17, 2000	DVD; VHS	BMG	
Australia	January 10, 2011	Double CD (Note: as The Essential Whitney Houston)	Legacy; Sony	
United Kingdom	January 10, 2011	Double CD	Legacy; Sony	
Poland	January 14, 2011	Double CD	Legacy; Sony	
Taiwan	January 14, 2011	Double CD	Legacy; Sony	
Canada	January 18, 2011	Double CD	Legacy; Sony	
France	February 14, 2011	Double CD	Legacy; Sony	
Germany	January 6, 2012	Double CD	Legacy; Sony	

== See also ==
- Whitney Houston albums discography
- Whitney Houston singles discography
- Whitney Houston videography
- List of best-selling albums by women
- List of UK Albums Chart number ones of 2000
- List of UK R&B Albums Chart number ones of 2000
- List of best-selling albums of the 2000s in the United Kingdom
- List of number-one albums of 2019 (Poland)
