= Irv Gotti Presents: The Remixes =

Compilation album by Murder Inc.
- Released: November 5, 2002
- Genre: East Coast hip hop; gangsta rap
- Length: 53:55
- Label: Murder Inc.; Island Def Jam
- Producer: Irv Gotti (also exec.); 7 Aurelius; Chink Santana; Mary J. Blige; Milwaukee Buck

Murder Inc. chronology
Irv Gotti Presents: The Inc. (2002)	Irv Gotti Presents: The Remixes (2002)	Irv Gotti Presents: Tales Playlist (2017)

Irv Gotti Presents: The Remixes is the third compilation album by American record producer Irv Gotti. It was released on November 5, 2002 via Murder Inc. Records and The Island Def Jam Music Group and consists of both original songs and remixes to previously released songs released under the label. The album debuted at number 24 on the Billboard 200 and number 5 on the Top R&B/Hip-Hop Albums in the United States.

== Track listing ==
No.	Title	Writer(s)	Producer(s)	Length
1.	"The Remixes Skit" (featuring Ashanti)	Irving Lorenzo	Irv Gotti	0:26
2.	"Unfoolish"	Ashanti Douglas; Marcus Vest; Lorenzo; Mark DeBarge; Etterlene Jordan; Christopher Wallace; Robert Kelly; Daron Jones; Sean Combs	7 Aurelius; Irv Gotti	3:13
3.	"I'm So Happy Remix" (featuring Ashanti, Charli Baltimore, Young Merc and D.O. Cannons)	Raymond Calhoun	Chink Santana; Irv Gotti	3:53
4.	"The Pledge Remix" (featuring Ashanti, Ja Rule, Nas and 2Pac)	Douglas; Jeffrey Atkins; Nasir Jones; Tupac Shakur; Vest; Lorenzo; Gregory Jacobs; Stevie Wonder	7 Aurelius; Irv Gotti	3:54
5.	"O.G. Remix" (featuring Caddillac Tah and Black Child)	Taheem Crocker; Ramel Gill; James Olowokere; Lorenzo; Willie Hutch	Milwaukee Buck; Irv Gotti	2:49
6.	"Boss Skit"	Lorenzo	Irv Gotti	0:42
7.	"Me & My Boyfriend" (featuring Toni Braxton)	Lorenzo; Toni Braxton; Tamar Braxton; Ricky Rouse; Andre Parker; Shakur; Tyrone Wrice; Darryl Harper	Chink Santana; Irv Gotti	3:36
8.	"Come-N-Go" (featuring Caddillac Tah, Ashanti and Ja Rule)	T. Crocker; Douglas; Atkins; Vest; Lorenzo	7 Aurelius; Irv Gotti	4:29
9.	"Poverlous" (featuring Caddillac Tah)	T. Crocker; Parker; Lorenzo	Chink Santana; Irv Gotti	3:49
10.	"Spanish Dancing Skit"	Lorenzo	Irv Gotti	0:25
11.	"Rainy Dayz Remix" (featuring Mary J. Blige and Ja Rule)	Atkins; Parker; Lorenzo; Andre Young; Alvin Joiner; Brian Bailey; Duane Johnson; Marquis Holder; Roger McBride; Royal Harbor	Mary J. Blige	4:09
12.	"Moreno Skit"	Lorenzo	Irv Gotti	0:45
13.	"Baby Remix" (featuring Scarface and Ashanti)	Brad Jordan; Douglas; Parker; Lorenzo; Michael Dean	Chink Santana; Irv Gotti	4:46
14.	"Hard Livin'" (featuring D.O. Cannons and Young Merc)	Gerard Fields; Jeffrey Crocker; Gill; Parker; Lorenzo	Chink Santana; Irv Gotti	3:56
15.	"No One Does It Better Remix" (featuring Ja Rule, Caddillac Tah and Black Child)	Atkins; T. Crocker; Gill; Douglas; Lorenzo; Vest; J. Crocker	Irv Gotti	3:43
16.	"Remo's Back Skit"	Lorenzo	Irv Gotti	0:18
17.	"We Dem Boyz (Let's Ride)" (featuring D.O. Cannons and Young Merc)	Fields; J. Crocker; Gill; Parker; Lorenzo	Chink Santana; Irv Gotti	4:09
18.	"Baby Remix" (featuring Crooked I and Ashanti)	Douglas; Parker; Lorenzo; Jordan; Dean	Chink Santana; Irv Gotti	4:53
Total length:				53:55

== Charts ==
Chart (2002)	Peak position
US Billboard 200	24
US Top R&B/Hip-Hop Albums (Billboard)	5
