= Cold as Ice (album) =

Studio album by Charli Baltimore
- Released: August 3, 1999
- Recorded: 1998–1999
- Genre: Hip hop
- Label: Untertainment; Epic
- Producer: Lance "Un" Rivera (exec.); DJ Premier; Ross Prentice; Teddy Riley; John Forté; RZA

Charli Baltimore chronology
Cold as Ice (1999)	The Diary (You Think You Know) (2003)

Alternative cover
- Advance Promo cover

Professional ratings
Review scores
Source	Rating
AllMusic	2.5/5 stars
The Source	3/5 stars

Cold as Ice is an unreleased studio album by American rapper Charli Baltimore, released promotionally on August 3, 1999, through Epic Records. It was originally titled "To Hell & Back", with a release date of April 28, 1999. The album did not make it to any Billboard charts since it did not see a public release, but the single "Stand Up" reached #9 on the Hot Rap Singles. Guests on the album include Ghostface Killah, Da Brat, Lady of Rage, Gangsta Boo, Mobb Deep, Cam'ron, Noreaga, and producer DJ Premier. Baltimore also recorded a collaboration with former friend Mase titled "Ice," but the song's prominent sample of "Under Pressure" by Queen and David Bowie could not be cleared. The album has now been released as a digital download on iTunes, with "Money" being a separate download from the Woo Soundtrack.

== Track listing ==
No.	Title	Length
1.	"Intro"	1:30
2.	"Angel Dust"	2:03
3.	"Stand Up" (featuring Ghostface Killah)	4:51
4.	"Keep It Real" (featuring Cam'ron)	3:56
5.	"Pull The Alarm" (featuring Billy Lawrence)	4:01
6.	"Everybody Wanna Know"	4:13
7.	"Welcome To The Tunnel" (Interlude)	1:24
8.	"Motherfuckas Don't Want It" (featuring Tony Dutch, Ace Spade & Boobonic)	4:04
9.	"Pimp Da 1 U Luv" (featuring 8 Ball & Rodney Ellis)	4:09
10.	"Feel It"	4:05
11.	"Money"	4:38
12.	"Thorough Bitches" (featuring Lady of Rage, Gangsta Boo, Queen Pen, Da Brat & Scarlet)	4:48
13.	"Infamous" (featuring Mobb Deep & Mike Delorian)	3:55
14.	"They"	3:48
15.	"Say Your Prayers" (Interlude)	1:11
16.	"Have It All" (featuring Jeni Fujita & Miss Jones)	4:00
17.	"NBC" (featuring Cam'ron & Noreaga)	4:00
18.	"Making Love" (featuring Brother)	3:50
19.	"Wake Up Bitch" (Interlude)	0:43
20.	"30 Miles From Baltimore" (featuring Brotha)	4:50
21.	"Outro"	0:44
22.	"Horse & Carriage (Remix)" (performed by Cam'ron featuring Big Pun, Charli Baltimore, Wyclef Jean & Silkk The Shocker)	4:47

== Unreleased material ==
In 2002, it was revealed that producer Irv Gotti had produced two tracks for the album in 1998 but never made the final cut of the album.

"Ice" featuring Mase (produced by Tumblin' Dice) was not included, as sample clearance could not be obtained for the samples of Queen and David Bowie's 1981 song "Under Pressure".
