= List of UK R&B Albums Chart number ones of 2000 =

The logo of the Official Charts Company, responsible for compiling all of the official music charts in the United Kingdom, including the R&B albums chart.

The UK R&B Chart is a weekly chart, first introduced in October 1994, that ranks the 40 biggest-selling singles and albums that are classified in the R&B genre in the United Kingdom. The chart is compiled by the Official Charts Company, and is based on sales of CDs, downloads, vinyl and other formats over the previous seven days.

The following are the number-one albums of 2000.

== Number-one albums ==
Issue date	Album	Artist(s)	Record label	Ref.
2 January	On How Life Is	Macy Gray	Epic	
9 January	On How Life Is	Macy Gray	Epic	
16 January	On How Life Is	Macy Gray	Epic	
23 January	On How Life Is	Macy Gray	Epic	
30 January	On How Life Is	Macy Gray	Epic	
6 February	Rise	Gabrielle	Go Beat	
13 February	Rise	Gabrielle	Go Beat	
20 February	Rise	Gabrielle	Go Beat	
27 February	Rise	Gabrielle	Go Beat	
5 March	On How Life Is	Macy Gray	Epic	
12 March	On How Life Is	Macy Gray	Epic	
19 March	On How Life Is	Macy Gray	Epic	
26 March	On How Life Is	Macy Gray	Epic	
2 April	On How Life Is	Macy Gray	Epic	
9 April	2001	Dr. Dre	Aftermath/Interscope	
16 April	2001	Dr. Dre	Aftermath/Interscope	
23 April	2001	Dr. Dre	Aftermath/Interscope	
30 April	Skull & Bones	Cypress Hill	Columbia	
7 May	2001	Dr. Dre	Aftermath/Interscope	
14 May	2001	Dr. Dre	Aftermath/Interscope	
21 May	Whitney: The Greatest Hits	Whitney Houston	Arista	
28 May	The Marshall Mathers LP	Eminem	Aftermath/Interscope/Shady	
4 June	The Marshall Mathers LP	Eminem	Aftermath/Interscope/Shady	
11 June	The Marshall Mathers LP	Eminem	Aftermath/Interscope/Shady	
18 June	The Marshall Mathers LP	Eminem	Aftermath/Interscope/Shady	
25 June	The Marshall Mathers LP	Eminem	Aftermath/Interscope/Shady	
1 July	The Marshall Mathers LP	Eminem	Aftermath/Interscope/Shady	
8 July	The Marshall Mathers LP	Eminem	Aftermath/Interscope/Shady	
15 July	The Marshall Mathers LP	Eminem	Aftermath/Interscope/Shady	
22 July	The Marshall Mathers LP	Eminem	Aftermath/Interscope/Shady	
29 July	The Marshall Mathers LP	Eminem	Aftermath/Interscope/Shady	
6 August	The Marshall Mathers LP	Eminem	Aftermath/Interscope/Shady	
13 August	The Marshall Mathers LP	Eminem	Aftermath/Interscope/Shady	
20 August	Born to Do It	Craig David	Atlantic/Edel	
27 August	Born to Do It	Craig David	Atlantic/Edel	
3 September	Born to Do It	Craig David	Atlantic/Edel	
10 September	Born to Do It	Craig David	Atlantic/Edel	
17 September	Born to Do It	Craig David	Atlantic/Edel	
24 September	Born to Do It	Craig David	Atlantic/Edel	
1 October	The Marshall Mathers LP	Eminem	Aftermath/Interscope/Shady	
8 October	The Marshall Mathers LP	Eminem	Aftermath/Interscope/Shady	
15 October	The Marshall Mathers LP	Eminem	Aftermath/Interscope/Shady	
22 October	Saints & Sinners	All Saints	London	
29 October	Saints & Sinners	All Saints	London	
5 November	The Marshall Mathers LP	Eminem	Aftermath/Interscope/Shady	
12 November	The Marshall Mathers LP	Eminem	Aftermath/Interscope/Shady	
19 November	Born to Do It	Craig David	Atlantic/Edel	
26 November	The W	Wu-Tang Clan	Loud	
3 December	Born to Do It	Craig David	Atlantic/Edel	
10 December	The Marshall Mathers LP	Eminem	Aftermath/Interscope/Shady	
17 December	The Marshall Mathers LP	Eminem	Aftermath/Interscope/Shady	
24 December	The Marshall Mathers LP	Eminem	Aftermath/Interscope/Shady	
31 December	The Marshall Mathers LP	Eminem	Aftermath/Interscope/Shady	

== See also ==
- List of UK Albums Chart number ones of 2000
