= If I Told You That =

2000 single by Whitney Houston and George Michael

Single by Whitney Houston and George Michael

from the album Whitney: The Greatest Hits
- B-side: "Fine"
- Released: May 29, 2000
- Recorded: March 2000
- Studio: The Hit Factory Criteria (Miami, FL)
- Genre: R&B
- Length: 4:33
- Label: Arista; BMG
- Songwriters: Rodney Jerkins; Fred Jerkins III; LaShawn Daniels; Toni Estes
- Producers: Rodney Jerkins; George Michael (duet version only)

Whitney Houston singles chronology
"Could I Have This Kiss Forever" (2000)	"If I Told You That" (2000)	"Fine" (2000)

George Michael singles chronology
"As" (1999)	"If I Told You That" (2000)	"Freeek!" (2002)

Music video
- "If I Told You That" on YouTube

"If I Told You That" is a song by American singer Whitney Houston. It was written by Rodney "Darkchild" Jerkins, Fred Jerkins III, LaShawn Daniels, and Toni Estes for her fourth studio album, My Love Is Your Love (1998), serving as its fifth track. Produced by Darkchild, the song was initially developed as a potential duet between Houston and Michael Jackson, but Jackson ultimately declined the collaboration, prompting Houston to record the song as a solo track. Musically, "If I Told You That" is an R&B and dance track built around a driving shuffle beat, layered vocals, and post-disco production.

A reworked duet version of the song with British singer George Michael was released on May 29, 2000, as the third single from Houston's first greatest hits album, Whitney: The Greatest Hits (2000). Reactions to the duet were more mixed, with some praising the pairing and others criticizing its vocal chemistry and execution. Commercially, "If I Told You That" peaked at number one in Iceland, Croatia and Poland, while peaking at nine on the UK Singles Chart. The accompanying music video, directed by Kevin Bray, features Houston and Michael in a nightclub, where they eventually meet on the dance floor.

== Background ==
"If I Told You That" is one out of three tracks that Rodney Jerkins, his brother Fred Jerkins III, LaShawn Daniels, and Toni Estes placed on Houston's fourth studio album My Love Is Your Love (1998). The song originated after Houston's mentor and Arista Records head Clive Davis heard Jerkins' demo of the song "It's Not Right but It's Okay," which he had submitted for consideration for the album, and asked him to develop additional material for potential inclusion of My Love Is Your Love. Jerkins and his team then developed "If I Told You That" as a potential duet between Houston and Michael Jackson. The demo they handed in even featured a vocalist imitating Jackson's voice. Satisfied with the result, Houston and Davis agreed to record the song with the expectation that Jackson would ultimately join her on the track.

When Houston was asked to contact Jackson about the duet, she reportedly waited nearly a week for a response. Jackson instead conveyed through an intermediary that he did not wish to record the song, prompting a disappointed Houston to record it herself. Although Davis reportedly believed the song would be better suited to a duet, the solo version was ultimately included on My Love Is Your Love. While compiling Houston's first greatest-hits album Whitney: The Greatest Hits, Davis approached George Michael about recording the song as a duet with Houston. Plans for joint recording sessions in Los Angeles, during which Houston was also expected to re-record her vocals, did not materialize after she repeatedly cancelled at short notice. Michael subsequently recorded his part independently and received a producer credit on the resulting duet version.

== Critical reception ==
The song received mixed reviews from music critics, with praise directed at its production, vocal performances, and the pairing of Houston with Michael, while some critics were more critical of the duet's execution and vocal interplay. Billboard described the solo version of "If I Told You That" as a standout track from parent album My Love Is Your Love, praising Rodney Jerkins' "club-ready production" and Houston's "crisp" vocals, which it said matched the song's "punchy beats." Writing in The Village Voice, Vince Aletti considered "If I Told You That" one of the album's more successful love songs. He wrote that Jerkins "whips up an even headier postdisco breakdown" and noted the "dark, anxious streaks" in Houston's vocals. Andy Gill of The Independent singled out "If I Told You That" as an album standout, praising its "infectious funk" groove and jazzy, contrapuntal piano figure, which he felt gave the song a distinctive sense of swagger and movement.

J. D. Considine of The Baltimore Sun commented on the song's lyrical premise, noting that when Houston sings about "giving in to temptation and having a fling with a friend," listeners should not assume that she is referring to "any friend in particular." In a review for Billboard, Larry Flick praised the vocal performances on the song's duet version, writing that Houston "scats and offers shout-outs" that give the song "spontaneity and energy", while describing Michael as "one of the finer soul men to step in front of the mike". Flick called the pairing "mightily inspired" and noted the song's "driving shuffle beat", layered vocals, and "catchy" chorus. Jim Farber of the New York Daily News noted that Houston and Michael's voices blend into a "conspiratorial blur" in the duet, while Vibe's Elysa Gardner described it as "lithely thumping." Ernest Hardy of LA Weekly described the Houston–Michael pairing as "inspired" in concept, but criticized the execution, writing that Michael's "pinched, nasal vocals" were added to the existing track and resulted in "two people singing at one another and daring the listener to care."

== Commercial performance ==
"If I Told You That" achieved moderate commercial success internationally, but did not match the commercial performance of "Could I Have This Kiss Forever," the lead single from Whitney: The Greatest Hits. It topped the charts in Croatia, Iceland, and Poland, while reaching number 27 on the European Hot 100, and it peaked at number 9 on the UK Singles Chart and number 4 on the UK Airplay chart. It also peaked within the top ten in Italy and the Czech Republic, reaching number 9 on the Italian Singles Chart and number 10 in the Czech Singles Chart. The song also reached the top 20 in Denmark, the Netherlands, and Scotland, and the top 30 in Belgium, Ireland, and Switzerland. Elsewhere, it peaked at number 37 in Australia, number 44 in Sweden, and number 58 in Germany.

== Music video ==
A music video for "If I Told You That" was directed by American director Kevin Bray and shot in May 2000 in the New York area. It marked Houston's fifth collaboration with Bray, following their work on "I Learned from the Best", "My Love Is Your Love", "It's Not Right but It's Okay", and "Heartbreak Hotel", and was Bray's only collaboration with Michael. The visuals depict Houston and Michael separately performing in a nightclub before eventually meeting on the dance floor, where they dance together amid the crowd. The video for "If I Told You That" was included on the US DVD single for Houston's next single "Fine" and later on Michael's video compilation Twenty Five.

== Live performances ==
Houston performed the song regularly in her set for the My Love Is Your Love World Tour in 1999, and performed the song during her four-date promotional Greatest Hits Live in 2000 and the Soul Divas Tour in 2004.

== Formats and track listings ==
- Australian maxi single
1. "If I Told You That" (album version) – 4:33
2. "Fine" (album version) – 3:35
3. "If I Told You That" (Johnny Douglas mix) – 4:48
4. "I'm Your Baby Tonight" (Dronez mix) – 5:05
- European maxi single
1. "If I Told You That" (album version) – 4:33
2. "If I Told You That" (Johnny Douglas mix) – 4:48
3. "Fine" (album version) – 3:35
- Promo CD single
1. "If I Told You That" (radio edit) – 4:05
2. "If I Told You That" (album version) – 4:38

== Personnel ==
- Produced by Rodney Jerkins for Darkchild Entertainment Inc.
- Additional production: George Michael
- Remix recorded by Dexter Simmons at The Hit Factory Criteria, Miami, FL
- Mixed by Jon Douglas
- Mix engineer: Ren Swan
- All instruments: Rodney Jerkins

== Charts ==
=== Weekly charts ===
Chart (2000)	Peak position
Australia (ARIA)	37
Belgium (Ultratop 50 Flanders)	41
Belgium (Ultratop 50 Wallonia)	25
Croatia (HRT)	1
Czech Republic (IFPI)	10
Denmark (IFPI)	16
Europe (Eurochart Hot 100)	27
Germany (Media Control Charts)	58
Iceland (Íslenski Listinn Topp 40)	1
Ireland (IRMA)	25
Italy (FIMI)	9
Italy Airplay (Music & Media)	3
Netherlands (Dutch Top 40)	19
Netherlands (Single Top 100)	31
Poland (Polish Singles Chart)	1
Quebec (ADISQ)	41
Scottish Singles Sales (Official Charts)	18
Sweden (Sverigetopplistan)	44
Switzerland (Schweizer Hitparade)	33
UK Singles (Official Charts)	9
UK Airplay (Music Week)	4

=== Year-end charts ===
Chart (2000)	Position
UK Singles (OCC)	176

== Release history ==
Region	Date	Format(s)	Label(s)	Ref.
Sweden	May 29, 2000	CD	Arista; BMG	
United Kingdom	June 5, 2000	CD; cassette	Arista; BMG	
United States	January 30, 2001	Rhythmic contemporary; urban adult contemporary; contemporary hit radio	Arista	
