= Irv Gotti Presents: The Inc. =

Compilation album by The Inc.
- Released: July 2, 2002
- Genre: Hip hop; R&B
- Length: 70:35
- Label: Island Def Jam; Murder Inc.
- Producer: Irv Gotti (also exec.); 7 Aurelius; Chink Santana; DL; Milwaukee Buck

The Inc. chronology
Irv Gotti Presents: The Murderers (2000)	Irv Gotti Presents: The Inc. (2002)	Irv Gotti Presents: The Remixes (2002)

Singles from Irv Gotti Presents: The Inc.
- 1. "Ain't It Funny (Murder Remix)" Released: January 7, 2002; 2. "Down 4 U" Released: May 2, 2002; 3. "Ride Wit Us" Released: December 17, 2002

Professional ratings
Review scores
Source	Rating
AllMusic	4/5 stars
HipHopDX	2.5/5
RapReviews	6/10

Irv Gotti Presents: The Inc. is the second compilation album by The Inc. It was released on July 2, 2002, through The Island Def Jam Music Group and Irv Gotti's Murder Inc. Records. Production was primarily handled by Irv Gotti (who also executive produced the album), as well as Chink Santana, 7 Aurelius, DL and Buck 3000. It featured contributions from Murder Inc. artists Caddillac Tah, Black Child, Ja Rule, Ashanti, Charli Baltimore, Vita, O1, and Jodie Mack, as well as appearances from Murder Inc. affiliates Merc, Ronnie Bumps and D.O., the latter of whom was killed in September 2003. Guest appearances include Jennifer Lopez, Eastwood and Crooked I.

The album spawned two singles: "Ain't It Funny (Murder Remix)" and "Down 4 U", both made it to the Billboard Hot 100 peaking at number one and six, respectively. The album debuted at number three on the Billboard 200 and number two on the Top R&B/Hip-Hop Albums with 193,000 copies sold in the first week, and was certified Gold by the Recording Industry Association of America on August 14, 2002, with sales of over 500,000 copies in the United States.

The songs Hold On and Gangstafied were included in the 2002 action film Half Past Dead, which starred Ja Rule.

== Track listing ==
No.	Title	Writer(s)	Producer(s)	Length
1.	"Intro" (featuring Irv Gotti, Chink Santana and Caddillac Tah)	Irving Lorenzo; Andre Parker; Tiheem Crocker	Chink Santana; Irv Gotti	4:38
2.	"Gangstafied" (featuring Ja Rule, Caddillac Tah, Ronnie Bumps and Chink Santana)	Jeffrey Atkins; T. Crocker; Ronnie Lane; Parker; Lorenzo	Chink Santana; Irv Gotti	4:40
3.	"Down 4 U" (featuring Ja Rule, Ashanti, Vita and Charli Baltimore)	Atkins; Ashanti Douglas; Tiffany Lane; Marcus Vest; Lorenzo; Larry Troutman; Roger Troutman	7 Aurelius; Irv Gotti	5:18
4.	"No One Does It Better" (featuring Charli Baltimore and Ashanti)	Jarmon; Douglas; Vest; Lorenzo	7 Aurelius; Irv Gotti	3:50
5.	"It's Murda" (featuring Chink Santana, D.O. and Caddillac Tah)	Parker; Gerard Fields; T. Crocker; Lorenzo; James Olowokere	Chink Santana; Irv Gotti; Milwaukee Buck (co.)	5:45
6.	"The Pledge" (featuring Ashanti and Caddillac Tah)	Douglas; T. Crocker; Vest; Lorenzo	7 Aurelius; Irv Gotti	5:06
7.	"Ride Wit Us" (featuring Jody Mack, Black Child, O-1, Merc, Ronnie Bumps, D.O. and Caddillac Tah)	Christopher Bristole; Ramel Gill; Otha Miller; Jeffrey Crocker; Lane; Fields; T. Crocker; Parker; Lorenzo	Chink Santana; Irv Gotti	4:53
8.	"O.G." (featuring Black Child)	Gill; Olowokere; Lorenzo; Parker; Willie Hutch	Milwaukee Buck; Irv Gotti; Chink Santana (co.)	2:49
9.	"The Rain" (featuring Jody Mack, O-1 and Ja Rule)	Bristole; Miller; Atkins; Vest; Lorenzo	7 Aurelius; Irv Gotti	5:11
10.	"Here We Come" (featuring Vita, Irv Gotti and Ronnie Bumps)	Lorenzo; T. Crocker; Larry Ogletree	DL; Irv Gotti	3:53
11.	"We Still Don't Give a Fuck" (featuring Ronnie Bumps, D.O., Merc, Jody Mack, Rah, O-1, Charli Baltimore, Caddillac Tah and Black Child)	Lane; Fields; J. Crocker; Bristole; Rahmane Donovan; Miller; Jarmon; T. Crocker; Gill; Parker; Lorenzo; Dave Parks	Chink Santana; Irv Gotti	4:06
12.	"1 Hearse, 2 Suburbans" (featuring Black Child, Ronnie Bumps and Merc)	Gill; Lane; J. Crocker; Ogletree; Lorenzo	DL; Irv Gotti	4:35
13.	"Ain't It Funny (Murder Remix)" (featuring Ja Rule, J-Lo and Caddillac Tah)	Atkins; Jennifer Lopez; T. Crocker; Lorenzo; Douglas; Mark Rooney; Craig Mack	7 Aurelius; Irv Gotti	3:53
14.	"Tha Nexx Niggaz" (featuring Chink Santana, Eastwood, Crooked I, Ronnie Bumps, Dave Bing, Black Child and Caddillac Tah)	Parker; Deshaun Woodard; Dominick Wickliffe; Lane; Parks; Gill; T. Crocker; Lorenzo	Chink Santana; Irv Gotti	4:40
15.	"DC Joe Skit"			2:26
16.	"Hold On" (featuring Chink Santana)	Parker; Lorenzo	Chink Santana; Irv Gotti	4:52
Total length:				1:10:35

Notes

- Track 1 to 14, 16: Produced for Top Dawg Productions, Inc.
- Track 5, 8: Co-Produced for Top Dawg Productions
- Track 1 to 14, 16: Recorded at Crack House Studios, NYC
- Track 1, 16: Mixed at Sound Castle Studios, CA
- Track 2, 4 to 12, 14: Mixed at Enterprise Studios, CA
- Track 3, 13: Mixed at Right Track Studios, NYC
- Track 1, 2, 4 to 13, 14, 16: Mixed for Top Dawg Productions, Inc.
- Mastered at Sterling Sound
- Eastwood and Crooked I appear courtesy of The Row Records.
- Jennifer Lopez appears courtesy of Columbia Records.

Sample credits

- "Down 4 U" contains interpolations from the composition "I Want To Be Your Man" written by Larry Troutman and Roger Troutman and publishing by Saja Music and Sony/ATV (BMI).
- "O.G." contains excerpts from "Brother's Gonna Work It Out", written by Willie Hutch, published by Jobete Music Co. Inc. (ASCAP). Performed by Willie Hutch. Used courtesy of Motown Records LLP, under license from Universal Music Enterprises.
- Ain't It Funny (Remix) contains a portion of the composition "Flava In Ya Ear" written by Craig Mack & Osten Harvey Jr., published by EMI April Music, Inc. (ASCAP). Performed by Craig Mack and used courtesy of Arista Records, Inc. on behalf of Bad Boy Records.

== Personnel ==
- A&R [Direction] – Chris Gotti
- Art Direction – Rick Patrick
- Coordinator [A & R] – Tara Podolsky
- Coordinator [Recording Administration] – Andrew Huggins
- Design – Dawud West
- Executive-Producer – Irv Gotti
- Executive-Producer [Executive In Charge Of Production] – Darcell Lawrence
- Featuring – Ashanti (tracks: 3, 4, 6), Black Child (tracks: 7, 8, 11, 12, 14), Caddillac Tah (tracks: 1, 2, 5 to 7, 11, 13, 14), Charli Baltimore (tracks: 3, 4, 11), Chink Santana (tracks: 1, 2, 5, 14, 16), D.O. (tracks: 5, 7, 11), Irv Gotti (tracks: 1, 10), Ja Rule (tracks: 2, 3, 9, 13), Jody Mack (tracks: 7, 9, 11), O-1 (tracks: 7, 9, 11), Ronnie Bumps (tracks: 2, 7, 10 to 12, 14), Vita (tracks: 3, 10), Merc* (tracks: 7, 11, 12)
- Management – Murda Management
- Management [Business Affairs] – Brian Robinson, Randy McMillan
- Management [Consigliere] – John Branca
- Management [Marketing] – Dan Tan, Deidre L. Graham
- Mastered By – Tom Coyne
- Mixed By – Brian Springer (tracks: 1, 2, 4 to 12, 14, 16), Irv Gotti (tracks: 1, 2, 4 to 14, 16)
- Photography By – Jonathan "Murda" Mannion*
- Producer – Chink Santana (tracks: 1, 2, 5, 7, 11, 14, 16), Irv Gotti (tracks: 1 to 14, 16)
- Recorded By – Milwaukee Buck (tracks: 1 to 14, 16)
- Recorded By [Assisted By] – Terry "Murda Mac" Herbert (tracks: 1 to 14, 16)
- Written-By – A. Parker (tracks: 1 to 3, 5, 7, 11, 14, 16), A. Douglas (tracks: 3, 4, 6), C. Bristole (tracks: 7, 9, 11), G. Fields (tracks: 5, 7, 11, 14), I. Lorenzo (tracks: 1 to 14, 16), J. Crocker (tracks: 7, 11, 12), J. Atkins (tracks: 2, 3, 9, 13), O. Miller (tracks: 9, 11), R. Gill (tracks: 7, 8, 11, 12), R. Lane (tracks: 2, 7, 12), T. Crocker (tracks: 1, 2, 5 to 7, 10, 11, 13, 14), T. Lane (tracks: 3, 4, 11)
- Written-By, Producer – 7 Aurelius (tracks: 3, 4, 6, 9, 13)

== Charts ==
=== Weekly charts ===
Chart (2002)	Peak position
UK Albums (OCC)	68
UK R&B Albums (OCC)	9
US Billboard 200	3
US Top R&B/Hip-Hop Albums (Billboard)	2

=== Year-end charts ===
Chart (2002)	Position
Canadian R&B Albums (Nielsen SoundScan)	52
Canadian Rap Albums (Nielsen SoundScan)	27
US Billboard 200	113
US Top R&B/Hip-Hop Albums (Billboard)	38

== Certifications ==
Region	Certification	Certified units/sales
United States (RIAA)	Gold	500,000^{^}
^{^} Shipments figures based on certification alone.
