= Down 4 U =

2002 single by Irv Gotti, Ja Rule, Ashanti, Charli Baltimore and Vita

Single by Irv Gotti presents Ja Rule, Ashanti, Charli Baltimore, and Vita

from the album Irv Gotti Presents: The Inc.
- Released: June 10, 2002
- Studio: The Crackhouse (New York City)
- Genre: Hip hop
- Length: 5:18
- Label: Def Jam; Murder Inc.
- Songwriters: Jeffrey Atkins; 7 Aurelius; Irving Lorenzo; Ashanti Douglas; Tiffany Lane; LaVita Raynor; Larry Troutman; Roger Troutman
- Producers: Irv Gotti; 7 Aurelius

The Inc. singles chronology
"Ain't It Funny (Murder Remix)" (2002)	"Down 4 U" (2002)	"The Pledge" (2002)

Ashanti singles chronology
"Foolish" (2002)	"Down 4 U" (2002)	"Happy" (2002)

"Down 4 U" is the lead single from Murder Inc. Records' compilation album Irv Gotti Presents: The Inc.. Produced by Irv Gotti and 7 Aurelius, the song features rapped verses from Ja Rule, Charli Baltimore, and Vita while Ashanti provides the chorus and sung vocals. The song is a remix as well as its music video being the sequel of Ja Rule's 2002 single, "Down Ass Bitch".

"Down 4 U" became a hit on the US Billboard charts in mid-2002, reaching number six on the Hot 100 and number three on the R&B, rap, and rhythmic charts. It also charted in several other countries, including the United Kingdom, where it peaked at number four.

== Background ==
The Irv Gotti-produced song interpolates Roger Troutman's 1987 hit "I Want to Be Your Man", for which he and his brother Larry Troutman were given writing credits. The associated music video showed the artists performing the song on a beach with cameos by Irv Gotti, Eric Roberts, Clarence Williams III, Bobby Brown, Whitney Houston and other members of the Inc.

In addition to appearing on Irv Gotti Presents: The Inc., the song also appeared on The Source magazine's compilation The Source Presents: Hip Hop Hits, Vol. 6 and as a bonus track on Ja Rule's 2002 album, The Last Temptation. The song was performed live by Ja Rule and Ashanti at VH1's 6th Annual Hip Hop Honors that honored Def Jam Recordings.

== Music video ==
Shot in Miami, Florida, the video begins with Eric Roberts and Clarence Williams III as detectives congratulating each other over their success in apprehending a couple as assumed suspects only to realize a case of mistaken identity. Then Ja Rule, Charli Baltimore, Vita, and Ashanti perform on a beach, a yacht, and a cabana party at night, with cameo appearances from Bobby Brown, Whitney Houston, Black Child and Irv Gotti.

== Track listings ==
UK CD single

1. "Down 4 U" (radio edit) – 5:16
2. "Down 4 U" (D'n'D vocal mix) – 5:30
3. "Down 4 U" (D'n'D Conemelt mix) – 5:47
4. "Down 4 U" (video)

UK 12-inch single

A1. "Down 4 U" (radio edit) – 5:16
A2. "Down 4 U" (D'n'D vocal mix) – 5:30
B1. "Down 4 U" (D'n'D Conemelt mix) – 5:47

UK cassette single

1. "Down 4 U" (radio edit)
2. "Down 4 U" (D'n'D vocal mix)

== Credits and personnel ==
Credits are adapted from the UK CD single liner notes.

Studios

- Recorded at the Crackhouse (New York City)
- Mixed at Right Track Studios (New York City)
- Mastered at Sony Music Studios (London, England)

Personnel

- Jeffrey Atkins – writing
- Ashanti Douglas – writing
- Tiffany Lane – writing
- LaVita Raynor – writing
- Larry Troutman – writing ("I Want to Be Your Man")
- Roger Troutman – writing ("I Want to Be Your Man")
- Irv Gotti – writing (as Irving Lorenzo), production
- 7 Aurelius – writing, production
- Milwaukee Buck – recording, mixing
- Terry "Murda Mac" Herbert – recording assistance
- Naweed "Dirty" Ahmed – mastering engineer

== Charts ==
=== Weekly charts ===
Chart (2002)	Peak position
Belgium (Ultratip Bubbling Under Flanders)	11
Belgium (Ultratip Bubbling Under Wallonia)	16
Europe (Eurochart Hot 100)	16
Germany (GfK)	54
Ireland (IRMA)	22
Netherlands (Dutch Top 40)	39
Netherlands (Single Top 100)	22
New Zealand (Recorded Music NZ)	23
Scotland Singles (OCC)	14
Switzerland (Schweizer Hitparade)	43
UK Singles (OCC)	4
UK Hip Hop/R&B (OCC)	1
US Billboard Hot 100	6
US Hot R&B/Hip-Hop Songs (Billboard)	3
US Hot Rap Songs (Billboard)	3
US Pop Airplay (Billboard)	22
US Rhythmic Airplay (Billboard)	3

=== Year-end charts ===
Chart (2002)	Position
UK Singles (OCC)	139
US Billboard Hot 100	44
US Hot R&B/Hip-Hop Singles & Tracks (Billboard)	38
US Hot Rap Tracks (Billboard)	14
US Rhythmic Top 40 (Billboard)	18

== Release history ==
Region	Date	Format(s)	Label(s)	Ref.
United States	June 10, 2002	Rhythmic contemporary; urban radio	Murder Inc.; Def Jam	
United States	July 29, 2002	Contemporary hit radio	Murder Inc.; Def Jam	
United Kingdom	September 30, 2002	12-inch vinyl; CD; cassette	Murder Inc.; Def Jam	
