= Charli Baltimore =

American rapper

- Also known as: Charli Baltimore
- Born: Tiffany Lane Jarmon; Philadelphia, Pennsylvania, U.S.
- Genres: Hip hop; East Coast hip hop
- Occupations: Rapper; singer; songwriter; television personality
- Years active: 1995–present
- Labels: Epic; Def Jam; Untertainment; Murder Inc.

Tiffany Lane Jarmon, better known by her stage name Charli Baltimore, is an American rapper and television personality. Her stage name is taken from Geena Davis's character in the film The Long Kiss Goodnight.

== Career ==
Charli Baltimore began her musical career when she met the Notorious B.I.G. in the winter of 1995, and they became involved in a romantic relationship. Several months into their relationship, she left him a voicemail of a rap verse that she had written and he began encouraging her to pursue a career in rap music.

Following the death of B.I.G., Baltimore continued her career in the industry, booking several modeling jobs and creating a number of hip-hop and R&B songs including "Money", with Gamble and Huff, and "Stand Up", which rose to the top ten of the Billboard Magazine "Hot Rap Singles Chart". Despite her moderate success on the charts, Baltimore's first studio album Cold as Ice was never released.

In 2001, she signed to Irv Gotti's Murder Inc. Records. Baltimore's first appearance as a Murder Inc. signee was on Ja Rule's "Down Ass Bitch", which peaked in the top 25 on the Billboard Hot 100. The single landed on Ja Rule's third studio album, Pain Is Love, which sold over three million copies in North America. The following year, she appeared on the Murder Inc. compilation album, Irv Gotti Presents: The Inc., making appearances on the songs ""We Still Don't Give a Fuck", "No One Does It Better", and the album's lead single, Down 4 U. Down 4 U was another success for Baltimore, peaking in the top 10 on the Billboard Hot 100. She also appeared on "The Last Temptation", as well as the Christina Milian track "Spending Time", and Ashanti's "Rain on Me" (remix). In 2003, she earned a Grammy Award nomination for Best Female Rap Solo Performance, for her single "Diary". Baltimore parted ways with Irv Gotti and Murder Inc in 2004.

In 2019, Baltimore was announced as a cast member on WeTV's Growing Up Hip Hop, with daughter, Sianni.

== Discography ==
=== Unreleased albums ===
- Cold as Ice (1999)
- The Diary (You Think You Know) (2003)

=== Mixtapes ===
- Natural Born Khronicles (2012)
- Hard 2 Kill (2013)

=== Singles ===
- "Money" (1998)
- "Stand Up" (featuring Ghostface Killah) (1999)
- "Feel It" (1999)
- "Horse and Carriage (Remix)" (1999)
- "Everybody Wanna Know" (2000)
- "Charli" (2000)^{1}
- "Nobody Does It Better" (featuring Ashanti) (2002)
- "Diary" (2002)
- "Hey Charli" (2002)
- "Come Test Us" (featuring Lil Wayne) (2007)
- "Lose It" (2008)
- "P.S." (2008)
- "Machine Gun (Remix)" (featuring Sally Anthony) (2011)
- "All Lies " (featuring Maino) (2012)
- "Philly Stand Up" (featuring Dutch) (2012)
- "B.M.B" (featuring Trick Trick) (2013)
- "Hunnids" (featuring Trick Trick and Cash Paid) (2013)
- "Bed Full of Money" (2015)

=== Featured singles ===
Year	Single	Chart positions			Album
Year	Single	US Hot 100	R&B	Rap	Album
1998	"Horse & Carriage (Remix)" Cam'ron feat. Charli Baltimore, Big Pun, Wyclef Jean & Silkk The Shocker	–	–	–	Confessions of Fire
2002	"Down Ass Bitch" Ja Rule feat. Charli Baltimore	21	8	5	Pain Is Love
2002	"Down 4 U" Irv Gotti feat. Ja Rule, Ashanti, Charli Baltimore & Vita	6	3	3	Irv Gotti Presents: The Inc.
2003	"Rain on Me (Remix)" Ashanti feat. Charli Baltimore, Hussein Fatal & Ja Rule	–	–	–	Collectables by Ashanti
2008	"Portrait of Love (Remix)" Cheri Dennis feat. Charli Baltimore	–	–	–	In and Out of Love

=== Guest appearances ===
- 1998: "Me & My Boo" Cam'ron – Confessions of Fire
- 1998: "Walk On By" Fat Joe – Don Cartagena
- 2000: "Mind Right Freestyle" Dj Whoo Kid, Foxy Brown (rapper)
- 2000: "Blak is Blak" – Bamboozled soundtrack
- 2001: "Spending Time" – Christina Milian – Christina Milian
- 2002: "We Still Don't Give a Fuck", "No One Does It Better" – Irv Gotti Presents: The Inc.
- 2002: "I'm So Happy (Remix)" – Irv Gotti Presents: The Remixes
- 2002: "Last Temptation" Ja Rule – The Last Temptation
- 2007: "I Am" Mýa – Liberation
- 2025: "Your Last Time Breathing" Lil' Cease – Everything is Hardbody Vol. 2
