= America's Sweetheart =

Informal label used by American media

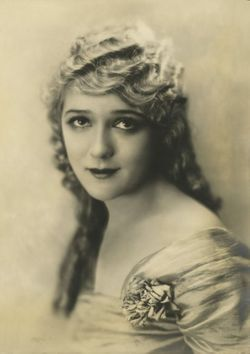
Actress Mary Pickford, the first known celebrity crowned "America's Sweetheart"

"America's Sweetheart" is an unofficial title used by the American media to describe a public figure who is widely admired and beloved by the public. The title is typically bestowed upon a young woman publicly perceived as wholesome, charming, humble, and relatable. The Canadian-born actress Mary Pickford is considered the first person to be dubbed "America's Sweetheart," a title bestowed upon her by the theater producer David Grauman in 1914, and subsequently used by film studios to promote her work. Historically, "America's Sweetheart" primarily referred to popular Hollywood actresses during the Golden Age of Hollywood, such as Shirley Temple and Debbie Reynolds, but it has since been expanded to include television performers, athletes, and musicians.

Since Pickford, dozens of celebrities have been named "America's Sweetheart." In film, actors in romantic comedy in particular, notably Meg Ryan, Julia Roberts, and Sandra Bullock have earned the title, which some have scorned for constricting their careers by subjecting them to typecasting.

Some celebrities have embraced and others denounced the title. Some critics find it sexist, perpetuating outdated stereotypes and expectations for women in the media.

== Definition and characteristics ==
The term "America's Sweetheart" is believed to have first appeared in the early 1900s. It has since been used to describe a large number of celebrities, typically "young, bubbly, wholesome-seeming ladies who women want to be and men want to introduce to their mothers", according to Shaunacy Ferro of Mental Floss. According to Philip Martin of the Arkansas Democrat-Gazette, recipients "are invariably young and pretty women who" seem to have little to no notoriety before "captur[ing] our imagination at just the right instance". He said some of them "fade away after a few months or years" while "others remain indelibly imprinted on our collective imagination". Patrick Rogers of Allure defined it as "part girl next door, part world-famous celebrity", which is passed down to a successor every few years. The screenwriter and director Nora Ephron recalled "America's Sweetheart" as a term she had learned from her parents, who were screenwriters during the Golden Age of Hollywood in the 1940s.

Although the term has occasionally been used to refer to some famous men, the overwhelming majority of recipients have been female. Scottie Andrew of CNN defined "America's Sweetheart" as a celebrity who is "so beloved that they appeal to most Americans, regardless of political and social differences", citing Dolly Parton, Tom Hanks, Betty White, and Oprah Winfrey as examples. Writing for The Independent, Clarisse Loughrey summarized the trajectory and fate of "America's Sweetheart" as "plucked from obscurity, plastered on every magazine cover, then doomed to inevitable overexposure". Loughrey identified common characteristics as young, female, white, "bubbly and grounded, but one firm step away from the unattainable sexpot". Maggie Lange of The Cut called it an archetype "bestowed upon the bearer of the most winsome laugh ... all unceasing charm, unobjectionable appeal. A person with a perma-1000-watt smile, flowing hair, and a down-to-earth ‘tude".

David Hinckley of HuffPost believes no celebrity has "ever set out to become America’s Sweetheart ... It’s more a matter of falling into characters ... who strike some intangible chord that makes them likeable to everyone in an irresistibly winsome sort of way".

== History and usage ==
The actress Mary Pickford is widely regarded as the first known person to be called "America's Sweetheart" publicly. Pickford was born Gladys Louise Smith in Toronto, Canada. After beginning her acting career on stage, Pickford moved to the United States, where she began appearing in the new medium, motion pictures, in 1909. By 1910, critics and audiences had grown endeared to her innate on-screen charisma, which distinguished her from other stage performers who had struggled to transition to silent films. Her immense popularity coincided with the rise of feature-length films. In 1914, movie theater owner David Grauman nicknamed Pickford "America's Sweetheart", despite the actress being Canadian, and Famous Players Film Company started promoting Pickford's films as starring "America's Sweetheart" two years later. However, some historians suggest that film producer B. P. Schulberg conceived the nickname. Pickford's reputation as "America's Sweetheart" is attributed to her playing poor, sweet, and innocent yet spirited young girls well into adulthood. By 1919, Pickford had established herself as one of Hollywood's most popular and highest-paid stars. She would go on to make some of her most memorable films during the early to mid-1920s, winning the Academy Award for Best Actress for Coquette (1929). She eventually retired from acting in 1933 after the advent of talkies and aging out of the ingénue roles she became famous for, transitioning to a full-time producer role. Pickford is one of the pioneering entertainers of American cinema, and one of the most important actors of the silent film era.

During the Great Depression, child star Shirley Temple was nicknamed "America’s Sweetheart", and experienced the most prolific period of her acting career, from 1934 to 1938. She became so closely associated with the nickname to the point where she was often mistakenly called "America's first sweetheart" in the press. During this time, Temple was America's highest-grossing performer at the box office, outperforming many grown film stars such as Clark Gable, Bing Crosby, and Joan Crawford. She retired from acting at age 21 as she had aged out of child roles, eventually venturing into politics for the remainder of her life. Beginning in the early 2000s, Fox released several box sets of Temple's work on DVD, calling them the "America's Sweetheart Collection". In the 1950s, actress Debbie Reynolds quickly received the nickname for "Her girl-next-door looks, bouncy personality and energy in a string of comedies and musicals", according to The Shreveport Times. After starring in Singin' in the Rain (1952), she became "America's Sweetheart" approaching the end of the Golden Age of Hollywood, and one of the era's top box office stars.

Initially breaking through on The Dick Van Dyke Show (1961–1966), the actress Mary Tyler Moore was nicknamed "America's Sweetheart" while starring as Mary Richards on her eponymous sitcom from 1970 to 1977, receiving the epithet from publications such as Esquire and Rolling Stone. Moore's portrayal of an unmarried, working woman was considered revolutionary for addressing topics pertaining to feminism and women's rights. Beginning with the gymnast Mary Lou Retton in the mid-1980s, a plethora of athletes have been called "America's Sweetheart", including the runner Mary Decker, the tennis player Chris Evert, and the swimmer Janet Evans. According to Ferro, "Just about every successful female athlete of the 1980s was at one point deemed to be America's sweetheart", a trend that has continued into the 21st century with the likes of gymnasts Simone Biles, Gabby Douglas, and Aly Raisman.

The 1980s and 1990s saw an influx of actresses sharing the "America's Sweetheart" title, most notably Meg Ryan, Julia Roberts, and Sandra Bullock. Ryan was first called "America's Sweetheart" by filmmaker Nora Ephron, with whom she had worked on When Harry Met Sally (1989), Sleepless in Seattle (1993), and You've Got Mail (1998). This trio of films "reinforced her status as America’s Sweetheart", according to journalist Christy Lemire. Each actress ranked among the most bankable and highest-paid of their time, with their films grossing millions of dollars at the box office. Their creative output was characterized by "romantic, sympathetic and funny roles", and they dominated the romantic comedy film genre during the peaks of their careers. Roberts in particular earned acclaim by portraying a series of different versions of America's sweetheart for over a decade, although History.com reported that Roberts' performance as a woman attempting to steal another woman's fiancée in My Best Friend's Wedding (1997) "upended her 'America’s sweetheart' reputation". In the 1990s, actor Tom Hanks was one of the few male actors called "America's Sweetheart", which critics attributed to his habit of playing good-natured characters and friendly public demeanor.

Actress Jennifer Aniston achieved global fame playing Rachel Green on the sitcom Friends from 1994 to 2004, transitioning to a successful film career once the series ended. In 2019, Rachel Simon of NBCNews.com said that arguably no other celebrity has retained the title "America's Sweetheart" for as long as Aniston, describing her as "an anomaly — a superstar whose status is tied not to her career, but to her humanity". Both Simon and Laura L. Finley, author of Women in Popular Culture: The Evolution of Women's Roles in American Entertainment (2023), attributed Aniston's longevity to her avoidance of being typecast as a "mother figure," unlike other screen actresses as they age.

In the 2000s and 2010s, the term "America's Sweetheart" was conferred on actresses such as Reese Witherspoon, Rachel McAdams, Jennifer Lawrence, Emma Stone, and Anne Hathaway. Lawrence was often compared to Roberts for "both having made their names in high-grossing romantic comedies, and both having picked up the Best Actress Oscar".

== Reception and criticism ==
=== Reaction and impact on actors ===
Some celebrities have embraced being called "America's Sweetheart", whereas others have publicly denounced the term. Pickford expressed interest in distancing herself from the image as early as 1923. In 1997, writer Kevin Sessums declared actress Renée Zellweger the newest "America’s sweetheart, proving just how far we’ve come since Mary Pickford", but Zellweger said she would never describe herself in this manner. Roberts expressed ambivalence towards the term, explaining that she originally mistook it for meaning she was "tiny" in stature. On the subject of potential successors, she told Oprah Winfrey, "Somebody else is always going to be the next sweetheart. It's all contrivance: Label them as fast as you can so you can keep them all straight". When asked about Lawrence in 2013 interviews, Roberts implied that she was "too cool" to be "America's Sweetheart", joking, "My card is expired and I didn’t get a new one". Bullock said the title is not real, explaining that the media crowns "a different 'America's Sweetheart' every time they have to promote another romantic comedy". Witherspoon said she considers herself friendly but does not identify with the term "sweetheart". In 2005, Aniston stated that while she was not deliberately trying to "shake" her "America's Sweetheart" reputation, she hoped her role in the then-upcoming Derailed (2005) would debunk the label.

Although Ryan eventually expressed gratitude for the title, she initially dismissed the term as a confining archetype that ignores whether its subject is smart, sexual, or complicated and "doesn’t allow for the full expression of a person". Despite understanding it was intended as a compliment, she found the description "old-fashioned" and "anachronistic". Calling it a reputation she had never aspired towards, Ryan felt the label potentially pigeon-holed her and limited her acting opportunities. For a period of time, she attempted to reshape her "America's Sweetheart" image by pursuing more dramatic roles, eventually reducing her workload altogether. Both Ryan and critics have reported that her image suffered from attempts she made to veer from the stereotype the public had projected on her, as well as rumors of an affair with her Proof of Life (2001) co-star Russell Crowe. Emily Reynolds of Stylist said Ryan's experience with the label "highlighted the double standards many women in Hollywood have to face". The actress Katherine Heigl believes the public's perception of her as "America's Sweetheart" ended when she came to be outspoken and sarcastic about poor experiences in some acting roles.

Kate Torgovnick of CNN criticized the Academy Awards for becoming predictable by appearing to immediately award the Academy Award for Best Actress to "America's Sweetheart" for playing against type, (Note: Sally Field, Gwyneth Paltrow, Julia Roberts, Halle Berry, and Reese Witherspoon had each won Academy Awards for Best Actress, while Goldie Hawn and Donna Reed had won for Best Supporting Actress.) and predicted Bullock's win in 2010. In 2011, Kurt Schlosser of NBCNews.com said few actresses working at the time achieved "sweetheart material" status in the same way actresses such as Ryan had during the 1990s. In the wake of the then-recent deaths of Reynolds and Moore, (Note: Debbie Reynolds and Mary Tyler Moore died on December 28, 2016 and January 25, 2017, respectively, within one month of each other.) David Hinckley of HuffPost expressed concern that America was "Running Dangerously Low On Sweethearts". Hinckley also attributed the lack of universally agreed-upon "sweethearts" to Hollywood making fewer "America’s Sweetheart movies" in favor of actresses pursuing tougher, stronger female roles.

In a 2020 article, Clarisse Loughrey of The Independent said that, unlike past "America's Sweethearts", modern-day versions such as Jennifer Lawrence are also tasked with existing in the internet age, in turn requiring them to be "not only covetable to her audience, but oddly accessible" in lieu of "The air of polished mystique that made Sandra Bullock or Reese Witherspoon look untouchable".

=== Race ===
Pop culture critics have documented that few people of color have been widely embraced as "America's Sweetheart", with singer Whitney Houston being a rare exception in a category dominated by white women. According to music journalist Gerrick Kennedy, the nation had not yet "collectively christened a Black girl as America’s Sweetheart" prior to Houston. Beginning with her breakthrough during the 1980s, Houston cultivated a wholesome image that was marketed as "America's Sweetheart" by both the media and her management. Journalists such as Janice Min and Bim Adewunmi called her "the first black America's sweetheart". Film director Kevin Macdonald said Houston cemented her status as "America’s Sweetheart" when she performed "The Star Spangled Banner" at Super Bowl XXV, becoming "this symbol of everything that was pure and sweet and lovely about America at that time". According to Constance Grady of Vox, Houston represented "a kind of Americana to which Black women are not usually allowed access" that simultaneously made her palatable to white audiences but dismissible by some Black critics, who at times accused her of selling out. In the mid-1990s, the singer traded her "America’s Sweetheart" image in exchange for championing Black culture and art. Houston's reputation soured in the early 2000s when her drug addiction and troubled marriage to singer Bobby Brown became highly publicized and parodied by the media. Grady theorized that Houston "was allowed to be America's Black sweetheart, but only if she followed the rules laid out by white America". Kennedy said that, for much of her career, Houston hid her personal struggles in order to be accepted as "America's Sweetheart", until the public ultimately ran out of patience with her. The term was also used to describe singer Brandy towards the end of the 1990s, during the peak of her singing and acting careers.

=== Sexism ===
By 1992, journalist David Zurawik considered referring to Retton as "America's Sweetheart" in news coverage an example of sexism and romanticism against female athletes. During the 2016 Summer Olympics, after the Final Five appeared on the cover of People with the headline "America's sweethearts", some publications implored the media to stop using the nickname to refer to Olympic gymnasts, with Heidi Stevens of the Chicago Tribune arguing that the designation fails to honor "their competitive prowess" and "sends kind of a creepy message to the hundreds of thousands of young girls who look up to these athletes". Caroline Praderio of Business Insider called the nickname "emblematic of sexist media coverage that female athletes often face", and journalist Juliet Macur described the term as an "itchy sash placed on every great American female gymnast". In 2018, Andrea Mandell of USA Today called it "so dusty and fraught with the residue of gender inequity that it might as well be retired in the Smithsonian". In 2024, college basketball coach Kim Mulkey deemed a Los Angeles Times article as sexist for describing her team, the LSU Tigers, as "dirty debutantes", in comparison to describing UCLA as "America’s sweethearts", among other more flattering terms.

== In popular culture ==
In the 1950s, pop artist Robert Indiana painted The American Sweetheart, which featured nicknames alluding to performers such as Fay Wray, Mae West, Ida Lupino, and Elizabeth Taylor. America's Sweethearts, a 2001 romantic comedy, starred the acknowledged "Sweetheart" Julia Roberts.

== See also ==
- List of catchphrases in American and British mass media
- It girl
- Girl next door
