= Fine (Whitney Houston song) =

2000 single by Whitney Houston

Single by Whitney Houston

from the album Whitney: The Greatest Hits
- B-side: "Love to Infinity Megamix"
- Released: September 19, 2000
- Studio: The Record Plant (Los Angeles)
- Length: 3:34
- Label: Arista
- Songwriters: Kamaal Fareed; Raphael Saadiq
- Producers: Raphael Saadiq; Q-Tip

Whitney Houston singles chronology
"If I Told You That" (2000)	"Fine" (2000)	"The Star Spangled Banner" (2001)

Music video
- "Fine" on YouTube

"Fine" is a song by American singer Whitney Houston. It was written and produced by Raphael Saadiq and Q-Tip for her 2000 compilation album, Whitney: The Greatest Hits. Released as the album's fourth and final single in September 2000, "Fine" was generally praised by critics for its sultry, soulful sound and Houston's restrained lower-register vocals, though some found the song repetitive or underwhelming. The song reached number 51 on the US Hot R&B/Hip-Hop Singles & Tracks chart, number 50 in Sweden, and number 39 in Canada.

== Background ==
"Fine" was written and produced by Raphael Saadiq and Q-Tip for Houston's 2000 compilation album, Whitney: The Greatest Hits. A mid-tempo R&B tune that features "languid retro-funk guitars" and a " sleek lite-funk sound," Saadiq wrote the song with Q-Tip during Houston's recording session at The Record Plant in Los Angeles, with Q-Tip developing the beat while Saadiq worked out the chords and bassline. Drawing inspiration from Houston herself, Saadiq had her signature style in mind while developing the track. Saadiq later recalled feeling nervous about asking Houston to redo a vocal take because she was rushing the lyrics. After seeking advice from her friend Robyn Crawford, Saadiq asked Houston to try the passage again, following advice he had previously received from Barry Gibb to frame a retake as an opportunity to "get a better one." According to Saadiq, Houston responded graciously and was "as sweet as she could be" during the session.

== Critical reception ==
"Fine"

Billboard wrote that "Fine" is "perhaps her most convincing crack at urbanized pop music to date. [Houston] seems to have eased into the chilled soul that propels a street-wise track. She wisely does not give into the temptation to belt and wail her way through the song [...]. Instead, Houston works the more sultry lower register of her voice, saving the big, beautiful notes as a dramatic accent toward the end of the cut." LA Weekly in its review for Whitney: The Greatest Hits wrote that "Only on the stellar R&B track 'Fine' does Whitney stand out. [...] 'Fine' is soulful, funky and tight as hell. And the vocal performance ranks among Whitney's best." The Baltimore Sun wrote that of the new tracks on Whitney: The Greatest Hits, "only the sultry, soulful 'Fine' manages to convey any of the strengths that made Houston a star", and that, "hearing [Houston] work the tune's insistent, retro-funk groove, there's no doubting that she still has what it takes to make hits". CANOE reviewer Jane Stevenson felt that the song "falls flat". The Star-Ledger wrote that the song "grows tiresomely repetitious". According to New Nation the song takes Houston "to even greater heights, changing [her] vocals to a much lower tone, with an added hip-hop bassline". The St. Louis Post-Dispatch called it "a wonderful composition".

== Chart performance ==
"Fine" appeared on the singles charts only in the United States, Sweden, and Canada. The song peaked at number 51 on the US Billboard Hot R&B/Hip-Hop Singles & Tracks chart. In Sweden, it debuted and peaked at number 50, but spent only one week on the chart. In Canada, it peaked at number 39 the week after it debuted and spent a total of four weeks on Nielsen SoundScan's Canadian Singles Chart.

== Music video ==
The music video, directed by Kevin Bray, features Houston at a rooftop cocktail party. In the US, a DVD single was released. It includes the videos for "Fine" and the Houston-George Michael duet "If I Told You That", plus behind-the-scenes footage from the "Fine" video shoot. Houston's then-husband Bobby Brown also appears in the video.

== Formats and track listings ==
- Europe CD maxi single
1. "Fine" (album version) – 3:34
2. "Love to Infinity Megamix" (edit) – 5:17
3. "Heartbreak Hotel" (R.I.P. mix) – 3:40
4. "Love to Infinity Megamix" – 9:22
- Europe CD single card sleeve
1. "Fine" (album version) – 3:34
2. "Love to Infinity Megamix" (edit) – 5:17
- Europe CD single
1. "Fine" (radio edit) – 3:34
2. "Same Script, Different Cast" (Jonathan Peters radio edit) – 4:20
3. "Same Script, Different Cast" (Friburn & Urik Cover Your Ears mix) – 10:49
4. "Fine" (instrumental) – 3:34
- DVD single
1. "Fine" (video)
2. "If I Told You That" (video)
3. Behind-the-scenes footage of the "Fine" video shoot

== Credits and personnel ==
Credits

- Produced by Raphael Saadiq and Q-Tip for the Ummah
- Orchestra arranged by Raphael Saadiq and Charles Veal, Jr.
- Orchestra recorded by Gerry "The Gov" Brown at Capitol Studios, LA, CA
- Orchestra conducted by Charles Veal, Jr. and performed by the South Central Chamber Orchestra
- Vocal arrangement: Whitney Houston

Recording and mixing

- Recorded by Jason Stasium and Danny Romero at the Record Plant, LA, CA
- Mixed by DJ Quik at Skip Saylor Studios, LA, CA

== Charts ==
Chart (2001)	Peak position
Canada (Nielsen SoundScan)	39
Sweden (Sverigetopplistan)	50
US Hot R&B/Hip-Hop Songs (Billboard)	51

== Release history ==
Region	Date	Format(s)	Label(s)	Ref.
United States	September 19, 2000	Urban adult contemporary; urban radio	Arista	
United States	September 26, 2000	Rhythmic contemporary radio	Arista	
Sweden	December 11, 2000	CD	Arista; BMG	
