= Catchphrase =

Phrase or expression recognized by its repeated utterance

A catchphrase (alternatively spelled catch phrase) is a phrase or expression recognized by its repeated utterance. Such phrases often originate in popular culture and in the arts, and typically spread through word of mouth and a variety of mass media (such as films, internet, literature and publishing, television, and radio). Some become the de facto or literal "trademark" or "signature" of the person or character with whom they originated, and can be instrumental in the typecasting of a particular actor. Catchphrases are often humorous, can be (or become) the punch line of a joke, or a callback reminder of a previous joke.

== Culture ==
According to Richard Harris, a psychology professor at Kansas State University who studied why people like to cite films in social situations, using film quotes in everyday conversation is similar to telling a joke and a way to form solidarity with others. "People are doing it to feel good about themselves, to make others laugh, to make themselves laugh," he said. He found that all of the participants in his study had used film quotes in conversation at one point or another. "They overwhelmingly cited comedies, followed distantly by dramas and action adventure flicks." Horror films, musicals and children's films were hardly ever cited.

== History ==
The existence of catchphrases predates modern mass media. A description of the phenomenon is found in Extraordinary Popular Delusions and the Madness of Crowds published by Charles Mackay in 1841:

And, first of all, walk where we will, we cannot help hearing from every side a phrase repeated with delight, and received with laughter, by men with hard hands and dirty faces, by saucy butcher lads and errand-boys, by loose women, by hackney coachmen, cabriolet-drivers, and idle fellows who loiter at the corners of streets. Not one utters this phrase without producing a laugh from all within hearing. It seems applicable to every circumstance, and is the universal answer to every question; in short, it is the favourite slang phrase of the day, a phrase that, while its brief season of popularity lasts, throws a dash of fun and frolicsomeness over the existence of squalid poverty and ill-requited labour, and gives them reason to laugh as well as their more fortunate fellows in a higher stage of society.

He gives contemporary examples of Londoners shouting "Quoz!", "Walker!" and "What a shocking bad hat!", describing the city as being "peculiarly fertile in this sort of phrases, which spring up suddenly, no one knows exactly in what spot, and pervade the whole population in a few hours".

== See also ==
=== Lists ===
- AFI's 100 Years...100 Movie Quotes
- List of catchphrases
- Category:Catchphrases

=== Related topics ===
- Anti-proverb
- Blend word
- Blurb
- Buzzword
- Cliché
- Clickbait
- Earworm
- Eggcorn
- "Holy..."
- Jabberwocky
- Meme
- Neologism
- Proverb
- Set phrase
- Slogan
- Sound bite
- Snowclone
- Trademark look
