= The Star Spangled Banner (Whitney Houston recording) =

1991 single by Whitney Houston

Single by Whitney Houston
- B-side: "America the Beautiful"
- Released: February 12, 1991 (original release); September 26, 2001 (re-release); January 27, 2021 (re-release, streaming)
- Recorded: January 27, 1991
- Venue: Tampa Stadium (Tampa, Florida)
- Genre: Pop; R&B; soul
- Length: 2:15
- Label: Arista
- Composer: John Stafford Smith
- Lyricist: Francis Scott Key
- Producers: John Clayton (music arrangement); Rickey Minor (music coordinator)

Whitney Houston singles chronology
"All the Man That I Need" (1990)	"The Star Spangled Banner" (1991)	"Miracle" (1991)
"Fine" (2001)	"The Star Spangled Banner" (2001)	"Whatchulookinat" (2002)

Alternative cover
- 2001 re-release cover

"The Star Spangled Banner" is a charity single recorded by American singer Whitney Houston to raise funds for soldiers and families of those involved in the Persian Gulf War. It is a cover of the national anthem of the United States of America, written by Francis Scott Key and composed by John Stafford Smith, and inspired by a rendition performed by Marvin Gaye at the 1983 NBA All-Star Game. The jazz and gospel arrangement for Houston's rendition was done by conductor John Clayton. The recording was produced by music coordinator Rickey Minor with all vocal arrangements credited to Houston. Considered the gold standard of all national anthem performances, it helped cement Houston’s status as a pop culture icon. (Note: Attributed to multiple sources:)

Mainly performed at American sports games, the song was performed by Houston at the original Tampa Stadium in Tampa Bay, Florida, for Super Bowl XXV on January 27, 1991. Although Houston was singing live, she was singing into a dead microphone, and television viewers were hearing a non-live pre-recorded version of the anthem due to her musical director making her aware of the risks of performing live, including the sound of the crowd, jets flying overhead, and other such distractions from pregame activities.

Ten years later in 2001, the song made a commercial resurgence following the events of the September 11 attacks in New York after Houston reissued it as a single. It eventually made its biggest peak at number six on the Hot 100, becoming the only instance of a national anthem recording reaching the top ten and Houston's last top ten hit of her lifetime, also topping its sales chart. In addition, the song crossed over to other charts, reaching the adult contemporary chart in its initial 1991 release and the Hot R&B/Hip-Hop Songs chart in its 2001 re-release where it reached the top 30. Its top 20 re-charting on the Hot 100 made Houston the first woman to re-chart the same song inside the top 20 twice.

Publications such as Rolling Stone, USA Today and Billboard have had the song either top or be placed in the top five of their all-time national anthem lists, either for the Super Bowl or in general. The televised performance's impact was comparable to that of Elvis Presley's 1950s performances on the Ed Sullivan Show. In some retrospectives, Houston was praised for making a "radical reclamation" of the anthem for black Americans with the performance being compared to Marian Anderson's performance of "My Country, 'Tis of Thee" at the Lincoln Memorial and also favorably comparing it to similar re-imagined renditions by Marvin Gaye and Jimi Hendrix.

== Background ==
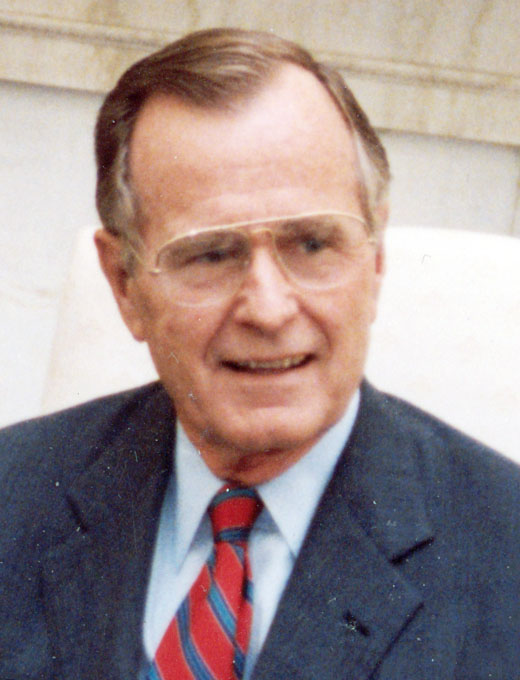
President George H. W. Bush sent American troops to Kuwait starting the Gulf War ten days before the Super Bowl in January 1991.

In November 1990, the National Football League (NFL) announced that Whitney Houston would be the singer to perform "The Star-Spangled Banner" at the following January's Super Bowl XXV. Around this time, tension between the United States and Iraq over the control of Kuwait was growing. Back in August 1990, Iraq, governed by Saddam Hussein, invaded Kuwait and occupied the country within two days.

Within hours of the invasion, Kuwait and US delegations requested a meeting of the UN Security Council, which passed Resolution 660, condemning the invasion and demanding a withdrawal of Iraqi troops. Then, on November 29, 1990, the Security Council passed Resolution 678, which gave Iraq until January 15, 1991, to withdraw from Kuwait, and empowered states to use "all necessary means" to force Iraq out of Kuwait after the deadline.

When Iraq refused, the United States sent troops flying over the Iraqi bases on January 17, dropping bombs, signaling the start of the Gulf War, a war that would last until February 28 when Hussein and his troops retreated from Kuwait, leading President George H. W. Bush to declare that Kuwait had been liberated from Iraq.

In the lead-up to the Super Bowl, which was to occur ten days after the first strikes, many Americans feared that Iraq would retaliate by attacking a major city in the United States, namely Tampa, Florida where the game was to be held. With organizers on edge, SWAT teams were sent to patrol the stadium. The Goodyear Blimp that would usually fly above the stadium during Super Bowl weekend was suspended and scheduled parties were postponed. Initially, Jim Steeg, then senior vice president of NFL special events, was not sure of having the national anthem played before the Super Bowl but President H. W. Bush insisted on them to keep up with the tradition of having the anthem played before the game.

Houston was initially sought after to perform the anthem at Super Bowl XXII but scheduling conflicts involving an important date for Houston at an Australian stadium during her Moment of Truth World Tour kept her from performing there. Eventually through Steeg's friend, Anthony Baldino, Houston and her management worked out plans for her to sing the national anthem at Super Bowl XXV.

== Recording and inspiration ==
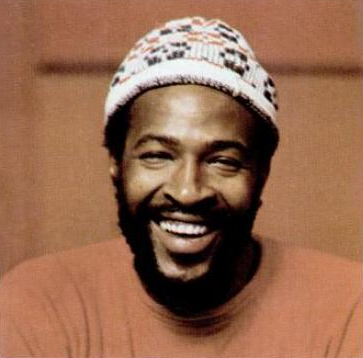
Marvin Gaye's 1983 rendition of "The Star-Spangled Banner" inspired Houston's version.

For the Super Bowl performance, it was decided that Houston would record her rendition of the song due to the NFL wanting to use the recording for safety measures for the televised live performance since F-16 fighter jets were going to be used as well as their focus on the meter.

Houston picked her musical director Rickey Minor to produce the session with bassist John Clayton becoming the main arranger. Houston was a fan of Marvin Gaye's slower soul-arranged rendition of the national anthem at the 1983 NBA All-Star Game and decided to use the Gaye version as inspiration for her own version, telling Minor, "It wasn't rushed, he was able to take his time."

The Florida Orchestra was picked to provide musical accompaniment in the recording, led by conductor Jahja Ling, who after some apprehension about the slower, soulful rendition of the anthem by Clayton, eventually was able to successfully conduct the arrangement with the orchestra.

Because the song was originally arranged on a time signature of 3/4, Houston advised Clayton and Minor to slow it to a 4/4 time signature, similar to Gaye's rendition as well as many soul and rhythm and blues recordings while additional arrangements by Clayton brought out jazz and gospel elements to the song. Houston's rendition of the anthem is set in common time and moves at 76 beats per minute.

Said Minor: "The original version is in 3/4 time, which is more like a waltz... what we tried to do was to put it in 4/4 meter... We wanted to give her a chance to phrase it in such a way that she would be able to take her time and really express the meaning." The time signature change gave Houston "more room inside each measure to nurture the notes." In addition, the pitch of the song, originally at B-flat, dropped to A-flat for Houston's version.

Minor stated that he sent the track to Houston but the singer never got to hear it, having been preoccupied with trying to secure her film role in The Bodyguard, to which she eventually succeeded after a screen test conducted by Kevin Costner. Houston recorded her vocals for the song after Minor played the song for her once in the studio. Minor claimed that Houston recorded her vocals in a single take, with an additional take on the same day. Minor later told people during a pre-Grammy event in 2023 that Houston's "unique and natural ability to sing and interpret music" helped to make her rendition stand out, saying "she had that instinct. She knew exactly what to do. You didn't have to tell her anything. She knew innately what to do, and that's the magic. Each time that she sang, it's different every single time, because she's singing from a deeper place – not from her head but from her heart. It was a bigger place."

Minor explained in 2022 why there were differences between the belting in the first verse and the softer crooning in the second verse, saying the first verse was "nice and strong", but that the second verse was created to “get more intimate, so that it can give you someplace to go because if you're just big, big, big the whole time, it doesn't give you a chance to breathe and doesn't give you a chance to bring the people in.”

During the final verse, Houston holds a note on the word "free" and then transitions into a two-note melismatic head vocal flourish, which would later draw much attention.

Cinque Henderson of The New Yorker wrote:

As Houston’s voice approached the high note on the word “free,” she slowed for suspense and for air, then rang the E-flat above middle C like a bell. With the extra room Minor had given her, she held on to the note for three counts (the traditional score affords "free" only a single count, but [Marvin] Gaye had also lengthened it, whether Houston explicitly remembered that or not). And then, in the split-second relay circuit of choices that we know as instinct, Houston leapt off the back of that E and sent her voice soaring even higher, dragging out the word “free” with a two-note flourish she invented in the recording booth, just as the measure was about to close. It had the sensation of a frighteningly tight line being pulled even tighter. The world would follow.

In addition to the octave shift on the word "free", Houston sustains a note on the word "brave" that lasts around 12 seconds.

=== NFL's initial reaction to Houston's recording ===
On January 17, according to Jim Steeg, NFL senior executives asked to hear the recording. A tape of it was sent to Buffalo, New York, where the AFC Championship Game was played.

The following day, Steeg was told by the executives that the Houston version was "inappropriate" and "too slow and difficult to sing along with. Could I ask to have it redone." In addition, NFL executives worried that the rendition was "too 'flamboyant' for wartime".

Journalist Danyel Smith compared the situation to José Feliciano whose own slower, lengthier Latin jazz-arranged rendition at the 1968 MLB World Series was met with an initial negative response, with NFL officials fearing Houston would be met with the same negative reaction for her interpretation of the anthem.

Similarly, both Gaye and American rock musician Jimi Hendrix were also heavily criticized for their own reinterpretations of the anthem in their respective performances.

Rickey Minor explained in 2022: "The NFL didn't want it, CBS didn't want it, they actually had me record a standard B-flat version for safety. They said this is the national anthem, its sacrilegious to touch it."

According to Steeg, he called Houston's manager and father John Houston Jr. to go over the recording. As Steeg recalled, the conversation was brief: "There would be no rerecording." Steeg and the NFL executives eventually decided to let Houston's recording stand.

== The Super Bowl XXV performance ==
If you were there, you could feel the intensity. You know, we were in the Gulf War at the time. It was an intense time for a country. A lot of our daughters and sons were overseas fighting. I could see, in the stadium, I could see the fear, the hope, the intensity, the prayers going up, you know, and I just felt like this is the moment. And it was hope, we needed hope, you know, to bring our babies home and that's what it was about for me, that's what I felt when I sang that song, and the overwhelming love coming out of the stands was incredible.

— Whitney Houston talking about how she felt at the moment she sang the national anthem at Super Bowl XXV (2000).

Houston arrived at Tampa Stadium on January 25, 1991, briefly rehearsing the performance with the Florida Orchestra before heading off to St. Petersburg, where she gave a concert at the Bayfront Center on January 26, previewing for fans her then-upcoming tour. A day later, on January 27, Houston took to the field where in front of an audience of 73,818 in attendance, she performed the national anthem with Ling and the Florida Orchestra backing her.

Initially, Houston was to wear a black cocktail dress for the event but on the day of her arrival to the stadium, temperatures in Tampa had cooled. Houston changed her mind on wearing the dress and decided on wearing a white Le Coq Sportif tracksuit with a matching white headband and red and white Nike Cortez sneakers as part of her performance instead.

Houston was announced by Super Bowl commentator Frank Gifford. During the performance, cameras showcased saluting troops and other military personnel holding all 50 flags of every state, while those in the audience, who had been giving miniature American flags to wave during the performance, were seen waving them in the audience during Houston's performance. Close-ups on Houston's face during her performance were also shown. Near the conclusion of her performance, a sweaty and emotional Houston lifted her arms in the air as she finished the song. As she left the stage amid roaring cheers and applause, four U.S. Air Force F-16 Fighting Falcons from MacDill Air Force Base flew overhead.

The pregame program, including Houston's performance of the national anthem, was produced by Bob Best for the NFL and televised live on ABC in the United States.

In addition to the 73,818 in the stadium, it was reported that Houston's performance was viewed by over 115 million viewers in the United States and a worldwide television audience of 750 million.

Because of the Gulf War situation, this marked the first time the Super Bowl would be telecast in most countries around the world. Outside of North America and the United Kingdom, the Super Bowl was broadcast for the first time in such countries as Australia, Russia, and most other countries. Houston's performance was later used as a music video, airing on MTV, BET and VH1 and other video stations.

Frank Gifford later stated "it was the most electric moment that I have ever seen in sports."

== Release and donation ==
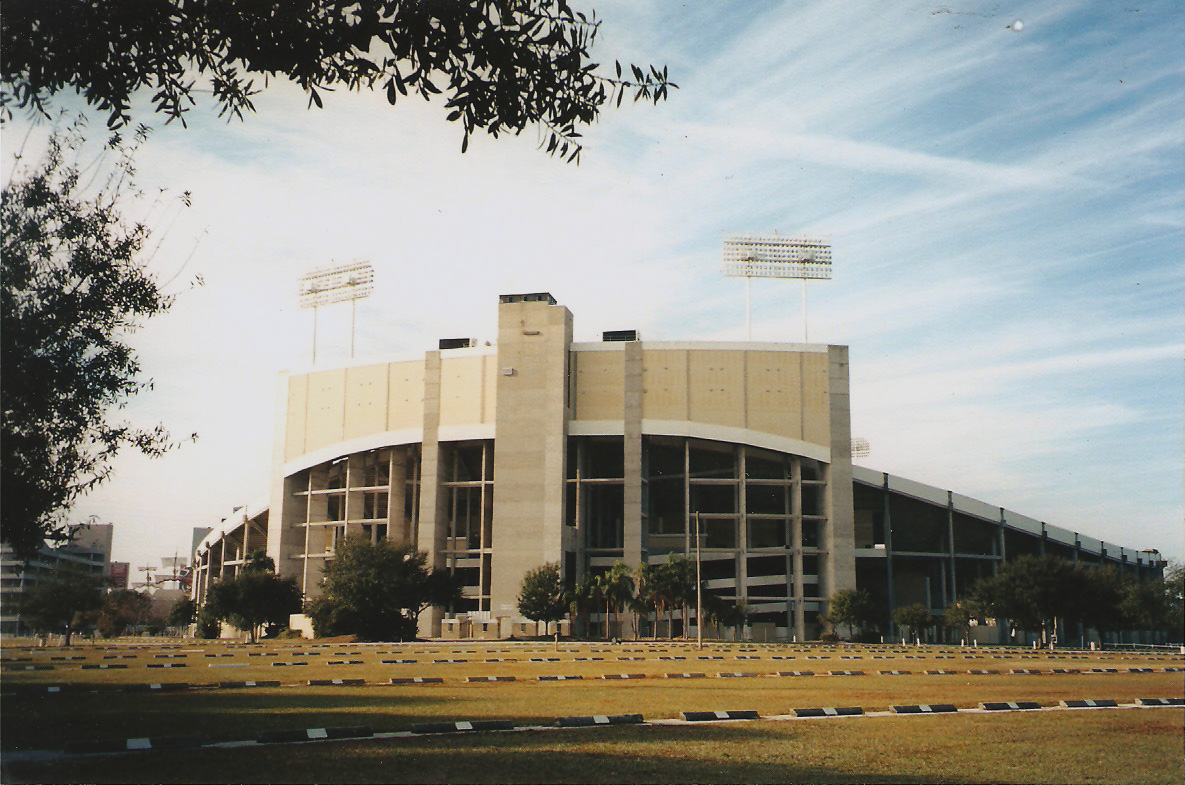
Houston performed her rendition of the anthem at Tampa Stadium in Tampa, Florida.

The patriotic feeling of Houston's stirring cover resonated strongly with the public. Afterward Houston told People, "I went back up in the sky booth and watched the game. It wasn't until a day or two later that I realized the whole country was in an uproar."

She continued: "I think it was a time when Americans needed to believe in our country. I remember standing there and looking at all those people, and it was like I could see in their faces, the hopes and prayers and fears of the entire country."

According to Clive Davis, Arista Records' decision to release the record came after three days of being flooded with phone calls from all over the country from people asking to buy copies of the single. Hundreds of radio stations around the country aired the song from tapes they had recorded from the TV broadcast.

Due to overwhelming response to her rendition and the growing fear that the recording would be sold as bootleg copies, Arista Records announced that the live Houston rendition would be released as both a single and video of her performance, and all profits would be donated to a charity connected with the war effort, to be selected by Houston at a later date.

Prior to its release, Houston and members of her own band including saxophonist Kirk Whalum recorded a contemporary rendition of Ray Charles' gospel-arranged interpretation of "America the Beautiful", which Charles recorded for his 1972 album, A Message from the People, and which became one of Charles' most significant recordings after a 1976 release during that year's bicentennial celebration of the anniversary of the United States reached the R&B charts. It would be the b-side for Houston's single.

The audio single of the performance was officially released on February 12, while the video single was released five days later on February 17, 1991, in the United States by Arista Records. All the proceeds―$531,650, a combined contribution from the Whitney Houston Foundation for Children, Inc., Arista and Bertelsmann Music Group Distribution which donated all their royalties and profits from the sale of those―went to the American Red Cross Gulf Crisis Fund, which provided aid to US military personnel, their families and war victims in the region. As a result, Houston was named to the American Red Cross Board of Governors. The audio single was also released in some countries including the Netherlands but its shipments were very small.

On May 16, 2000, the song and its video were released on CD, VHS and DVD of her Whitney: The Greatest Hits. The song was only included in the domestic version of the album.

According to Arista, Houston, who had been in the process of picking songs for the upcoming album with then Arista CEO L.A. Reid before the September 11 attacks, shortly after the attack, decided to do her part to help the country recover by agreeing to have her 1991 rendition of "The Star Spangled Banner" re-released.

Therefore, it was reissued as a commercial CD single on September 26, 2001, by Arista Records, with proceeds going to the New York Firefighters 9/11 Disaster Relief Fund and the New York Fraternal Order of Police; the single also included her version of "America the Beautiful." With the rerelease of the single, Reid said "in a time of tragedy, Whitney Houston's recording of our National Anthem has comforted and inspired our nation."

== Critical reception ==
Houston's rendition of "The Star Spangled Banner" has garnered unanimous acclaim since her performance and has been cited as a benchmark for the performances of its kind. Hubert Mizell of St. Petersburg Times lauded her performance, saying "Whitney Houston brought down the house as the lady with the super pipes sang the Super Bowl's most meaningful national anthem ever." Liz Smith from Newsday called the performance "[a] magnificent rendition," commenting "Her [Houston's] powerhouse version [...] turned that often impossible-to-sing tune into a hit." Entertainment Weekly's Jess Cagle noted the specific circumstances, particularly a patriotic mood at the time, rather than the performance itself, stating that "Her [Houston's] timing couldn't be better: patriotism, thanks to the Iraqi war, is high, and Francis Scott Key's 1814 ode to the flag is about to celebrate its 60th anniversary as our national anthem. The Gulf war fervor has turned Houston's performance into an unlikely, overnight pop hit." Jon Pareles of The New York Times said that Houston's rendition represented the image which the war was recast as "sexy and exhilarating" in the 1990s, becoming a counterpart to Jimi Hendrix's at Woodstock in 1969. He was critical of the media which used Houston's performance as a means of allowing the public to forget the violence of war, and the public's unquestioning acceptance of that, stating "'The Star-Spangled Banner' memorializes 'bombs bursting in air,' and the quiver in Ms. Houston's voice finds seductiveness in the rockets' red glare. But so far, despite the gleaming high-tech weapons paraded on the nightly news, the pop public hasn't joined her. For the moment, it is keeping its distance and hoping the worst will be over soon."

Deborah Wilker of South Florida Sun-Sentinel commented that Houston's version was a "moving rendition" and "imaginative arrangement" of the national anthem, adding "The rare moment on the football field showed her to be much more than a hit machine." Jim Farber, a music critic of New York Daily News, in his review of Houston's 2000 album Whitney: The Greatest Hits, said the song was "bold enough to launch a thousand ships." Sportswriter Dave Anderson of The New York Times commented that "When Whitney Houston belted out the national anthem with the nation at war, she reminded everybody that there was a much more important world out there beyond the Super Bowl, a much more important world beyond even the Giants' hold-your-breath triumph when Bills kicker Scott Norwood's 47-yard field goal try sailed wide right." Los Angeles Times's J. A. Adande, a sports columnist, commented that "It dripped red, white and blue," placing Houston's Super Bowl performance at number three on his list for the best renditions of "The Star-Spangled Banner." In February 2003, Vibe, in a feature article in honor of Super Bowl XXXVII, wrote that Houston's performance was "sweet, sweaty and sensational," choosing it as "Most Kleenex-Worthy Performance." In 2005, Orlando Sentinel's Emily Badger, in her articles of the national anthem, picked Houston's rendition of the song as the first of the three good performances along with Marvin Gaye's at the 1983 NBA All-Star Game, and Natalie Gilbert and Maurice Cheeks's in 2003 NBA playoffs, saying a word of praise: "Whitney Houston [...] was so good it sold successfully as a single." Janet Mock of People magazine extolled her performance that "Houston gave one of the most iconic interpretations of the National Anthem in history." Writing for MTV.com in February 2009, Gil Kaufman said the song is a "legendary take on the National Anthem." Luchina Fisher and Sheila Marikar of ABC News, in their articles of lip-syncing, wrote that "Houston's unforgettable rendition of the anthem [...] set the standard that most singers have tried to top." Jenny Mayo of The Washington Times, in her review of Houston's 2009 album I Look to You, praised the rendition highly: "Miss Houston is an artist who can—or at least used to—make songs untouchable. 'The Star Spangled Banner' will never be the same." Bill Lamb from About.com expressed that "[Houston's] formidable power made her Super Bowl XXV 'Star Spangled Banner' performance a legendary moment," and on her biography by Lamb, also described it "as one of the most stunning televised performances ever." Monica Herrera of Billboard called Houston's performance an "epic take", adding "[Houston] made it memorable."

Rushelle O'Shea of Yahoo! Sports called it "the most beautiful and most moving to have ever been performed at a sporting event" and recalled then "Leaving the crowd with tears in their eyes, she moved the hearts of many and received a well-earned standing ovation for this beautiful performance," choosing the performance as one of 'The Top 10 Greatest Sports Songs of All Time'. While commenting on Christina Aguilera's performance of the national anthem at Super Bowl XLV, The Christian Science Monitor's Peter Grier drew comparisons between Houston's version and Aguilera's, writing "One thing is sure: She [Aguilera] was no Whitney Houston. Remember Ms. Houston's performance of 'The Star-Spangled Banner' at the Super Bowl in 1991? Houston [...] gave an emotional rendition of the song, and it remains one of her career highlights." The Oxford Student's Abbas Panjwani wrote that "Houston's version is totally euphoric and boundless in energy. Nothing overly fancy. Just immense vocal talent." Chris Willman from Yahoo! Music complimented on Houston's version of the song that it "hasn't aged" and "may remain the most highly regarded version of our lifetimes," ranked second in his 'The 10 Best National Anthems Ever' list. Mike Vaccaro of New York Post recalled the performance that "Not only because she [Houston] was at her peak that January of 1991, not only because we were at war, but she hits the final note ('brave') in a different way than almost anyone else who's ever tried to sing it, and it is unforgettable," choosing it as his all time number-one favorite among the national anthems. Both Jack Yacks and Gary Mills of The Florida Times-Union described the song as "the gold standard for national anthem performances." In March 2011, St. Petersburg Times' Tom Jones, in his article of memorable sporting events in Tampa Bay Area, recalled the Super Bowl XXV as follows: "the game was about more than football. The United States was embroiled in the first Gulf War, and Whitney Houston, right, backed by the Florida Orchestra, produced goose bumps and tears with a powerful rendition of the Star-Spangled Banner. It is one of the great Super Bowl moments." In their article of the best patriotic anthems by New Jersey artists ahead of the Fourth of July, in which Houston's rendition of the national anthem was the top-ranked song, Asbury Park Press wrote that with the song, Houston "brought the country together" by "merg[ing] the pride, patriotism and fear all Americans felt at that moment." Rolling Stone readers ranked it the sixth best Whitney Houston song ever.

== Chart performance ==
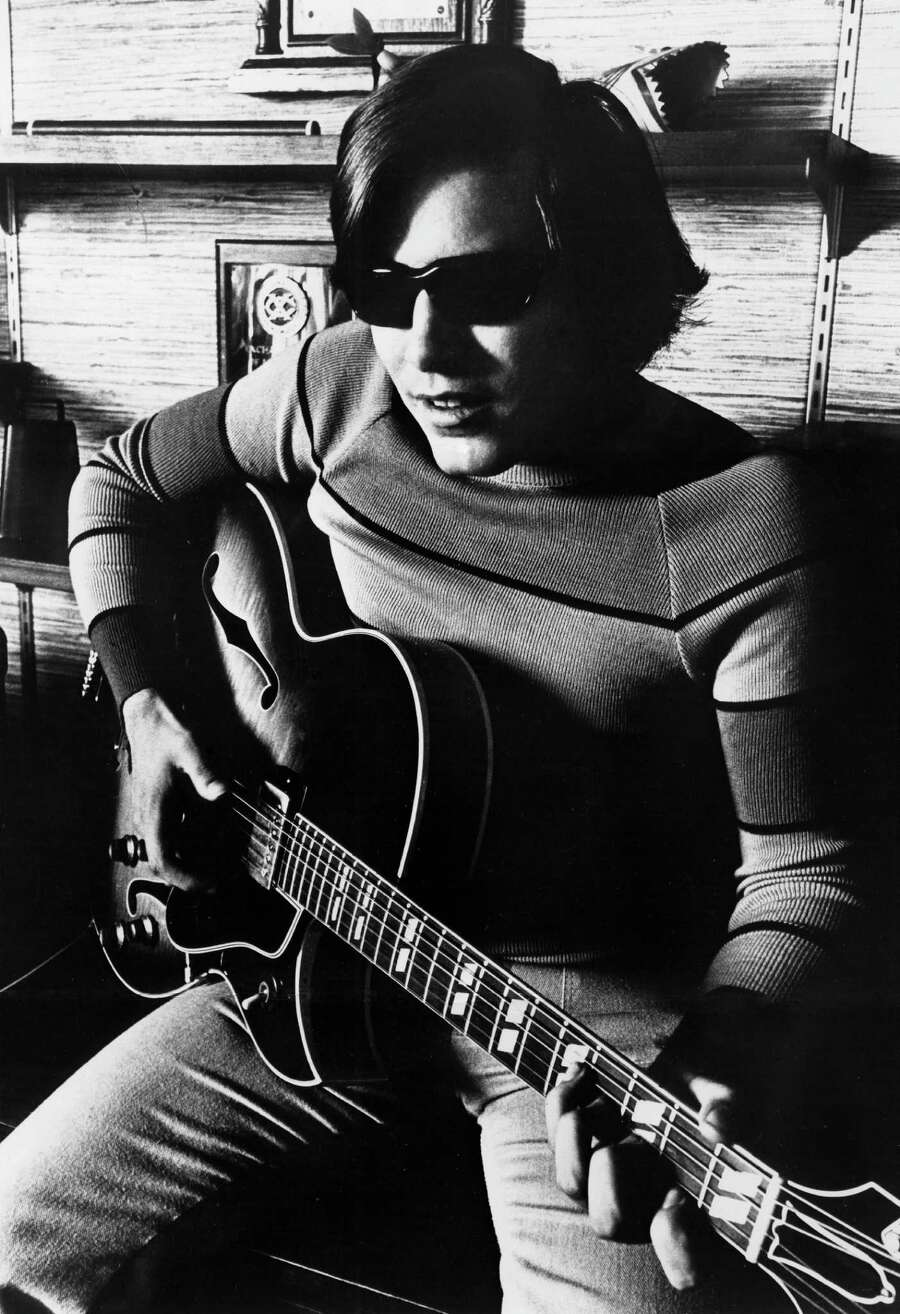
Houston was the first artist to chart with "The Star Spangled Banner" since José Feliciano (pictured in 1973) charted with his rendition in 1968.

On the March 9, 1991 issue of Billboard, the song debuted at number 32 on the Billboard Hot 100. It was the first rendition of the anthem to hit the chart since José Feliciano's version during Game 5 pregame ceremonies of the 1968 World Series reached number 50. It also made chart history as the first occurrence of a national anthem reaching the top 40 in the contemporary era.

It also became her highest career chart debut at the time outdoing her previous high chart debut from "I Wanna Dance with Somebody (Who Loves Me)", which had debuted on the same chart at number 38 in May 1987 and was also Arista's highest chart debut ever at the time.

In the following week (March 16), it leaped to number 25. Two weeks later, on March 30, it made its initial chart peak at number 20, making Houston the first and only artist of the rock era to hit the Top 20 with the national anthem, eventually spending eleven weeks on the chart. It also charted on the Adult Contemporary chart at number 48 on March 2, as the "Hot Shot Debut" of that week, becoming its peak.

In the same week it reached its peak on the Hot 100, the video single peaked at number one on Billboard's Top Music Videos chart, replacing Vanilla Ice's "Play That Funky Music" at the top.

On April 11, 1991, both the audio single and video single were certified by the Recording Industry Association of America, with the former being certified gold for shipments of 500,000 copies while the video single was certified 2x platinum for shipments of 100,000 units. "The Star Spangled Banner" became the fastest-selling single in Arista's history at the time, with 750,000 copies sold in the first eight days.

According to British biographer Richard Seal, the song was the fastest-selling single in the United States since the 1985 charity single, "We Are the World".

Following the September 11 attacks in 2001, the song received multiple spins on radio, which helped it to re-enter the Hot 100 Airplay chart at number 45 for the week of September 29, 2001, with over 30 million listeners, resulting in it also returning to the Billboard Hot 100 at number 50 that same week. It also debuted for the first time on Hot R&B/Hip-Hop Singles & Tracks chart at number 54 in the same week.

On its first week of retail re-release, the song re-entered the Billboard Hot 100 Singles Sales chart at number two on October 13, and the following week topped the chart in the October 20 issue, becoming her third chart-topper there after "I Will Always Love You" and "Exhale (Shoop Shoop)".

In the same week, the single reached number 13 on the Hot 100, marking the first time a song by a female artist re-charted inside the top 20 twice. That same week, the song reached its peak position of number 30 on the Hot R&B/Hip-Hop Songs chart, resulting in Houston's 36th top 40 entry on the R&B charts. (Note: Except for her 2000 hit, "Fine", all of Houston's singles managed to make the top 40 of the R&B charts up until that point. Of her 46 chart entries, only six charted below the top 40.)

On the October 27, 2001 issue of Billboard, Houston set another historic record on the Hot 100 when "The Star Spangled Banner" peaked at number six on the chart, becoming her 23rd and final top ten single. In doing so, Houston became the first and only artist to send the national anthem to the top 10 since the debut of the Billboard Hot 100 in August 1958. (Note: It's claimed that in previous Billboard charts, singers such as Margaret Woodrow Wilson and John McCormack also sent their renditions of the anthem to the top ten though Billboard wouldn't start posting singles charts until 1940.)

Following its September 29, 2001 re-entry, it would spend 16 additional weeks from September 29 through January 29, 2002. In all, it would spend 27 cumulative weeks on the chart becoming the third longest-charting single of her career on the Hot 100. Impressively, the song spent six weeks at number one on the Hot 100 Singles Sales chart from October 20, 2001 through November 24, 2001, eventually spending a total of 94 weeks on the chart through May 2003.

On October 3, 2001, the single was certified platinum by the Recording Industry Association of America for shipments of a million copies, becoming Houston's seventh platinum single. As of 2007, the song has sold over 1.2 million copies in the United States alone, according to Nielsen SoundScan.

As the single was released in some countries in 1991, it failed to make the pop charts outside of the United States due to only limited issues being sold in those countries, namely the Netherlands. In 2001, however, the single surprisingly debuted a peak of number five on the Canadian SoundScan Singles chart for the week dated November 11, 2001. It marked the first and only time a national anthem of a different country charted in another country.

== Achievements and accolades ==
Following the Super Bowl, Houston became the only pop star to receive an NFL Pro Set card with her image of her arms raising in the air in the middle of her Super Bowl performance being shown under the title, "NFL Newsreel: Whitney Wows 'Em at Super Bowl".

In October 1991, Houston received the Music Award at Ebony's American Black Achievement Awards, with the Super Bowl national anthem performance partially contributing to the win. It was Houston's third Music Award.

In 2013, Houston's iconic look and tracksuit outfit from the performance was one of four Madame Tussauds wax statues made of the singer and has since been placed on display at the Washington, DC branch of Madame Tussauds.

The performance has made several greatest and best-of lists in the years since its airing in 1991.

In 2000, VH1 listed the performance as one of the greatest rock and roll moments in TV history. Almost a decade later, in 2008, the performance was listed in another VH1 list, this one being the "100 Greatest Moments That Rocked TV". The performance has often been compared to Elvis Presley's landmark trio of shows on the Ed Sullivan Show in 1956, stating the performance was "as influential a moment in television history" as Presley's performances.

In February 2012, the same month of her death, CBS Sports and the NFL had Houston's rendition topping their list of all-time national anthem performances at the Super Bowl. That same month, Rolling Stone magazine included it in their list of "Ten Incredible Whitney Houston Performances", with the magazine citing the performance as "the gold standard" of all national anthem performances. The same magazine's readers listed the rendition Houston's sixth best song.

The performance topped two Rolling Stone lists in 2003 and 2023; the first list being "25 Most Memorable Music Moments in NFL History" and the second being "20 Most Memorable National Anthem Performances".

In 2022, when ranking her 40 best songs, BET ranked her national anthem rendition third place, calling it "the most definitive rendition of the national anthem", further writing "Whitney was already a star at this point, but this performance made her a legend."

In that same year, Parade magazine ranked it the second greatest Houston song of all time, stating it was "simply the very best the National Anthem has ever sounded."

In 2023, Billboard ranked it number one on their list of 11 greatest national anthem performances. Three years earlier, in 2020, on the eve of Houston's induction into the Rock and Roll Hall of Fame, the song was ranked Houston's 7th best song of her catalog.

In 2024, Entertainment Weekly ranked the song as the second best Houston song of all time, calling it "chills inducing".

In 2025, the rendition was voted the number one most memorable Super Bowl national anthem by Rolling Stone magazine, with Rob Sheffield writing, "Still the gold standard for all Super Bowl performances more than 30 years later, Whitney Houston’s prerecorded version of the National Anthem stands as one of the most legendary moments in NFL history. It’s the only Super Bowl anthem that rivals famous versions like Marvin Gaye (at the 1983 NBA All-Star Game) or Jose Feliciano (at the 1963 [sic] World Series) or Jimi Hendrix (at Woodstock in 1969). It’s gone down in history as of her most beloved performances."

That same year, ESPN claimed that Houston's national anthem performance was the second most searched Super Bowl national anthem performance according to Google searches. It was the only 20th century performance of the anthem to be listed while the other nine performances listed all came from the 21st century.

Five years earlier, Google itself revealed during Black History Month that Houston's rendition was the most searched anthem performance on their search engine.

In January 2026, 35 years after its performance, Parade magazine listed it the greatest Super Bowl national anthem performance of all time, writing, "If God ever did bless America, it happened when Houston touched the mic", adding, "not only is hers the best performance of the national anthem ever at the Super Bowl, but it’s also, by a mile, hands-down the best performance of 'The Star-Spangled Banner' of all time."

In March 2026, commemorating the 95th anniversary of the Star-Spangled Banner becoming the official anthem of the US, in ranking the best and worst versions of the national anthem, People magazine ranked the Houston rendition the number one best rendition, writing that Houston's version was "the greatest pop version of the national anthem in history... with near-unanimous agreement."

In June 2026, CBS News included Houston's rendition of the anthem in its list of the 250 essential American songs of the past 250 years, one of two Houston songs to make the list and one of two renditions of the anthem to make the list, the other being the Hendrix version.

Critic lists
Publisher/critic	Year	Listicle	Rank	Ref.
VH1	2000	100 Greatest Rock & Roll Moments on TV	59	
VH1	2003	100 Moments That Rocked TV	12	
NFL/Rolling Stone	2003	25 Most Memorable Music Moments in NFL History	1	
ESPN.com Page 2	2005	100 Greatest Super Bowl Moments	18	
TV Land	2006	Top Ten Musical Moments	7	
USA Today Sports Weekly	2007	The Best National Anthem in 40 Years of Super Bowl History	2	
Blender	2009	The Top 5 Intriguing Artist Performances of The Star Spangled Banner	2	
CBS Sports NFL	2012	Super Bowl all-time national anthems	1	
Yardbarker	2018	Top 51 Super Bowl National Anthem Performances	1	
The A.V. Club	2023	The 30 Greatest National Anthem Performances of All Time, Ranked	1	
CBS News	2026	The Essential American Songbook	Placed	

== Controversy ==
=== Lip sync allegations ===
In the days following Houston's performance of the national anthem at Super Bowl XXV, a controversy arose when it was reported that she lip-synced to her own pre-recorded version of the song.

Accounts of the performance vary. Bob Best, an NFL pre-game entertainment official, stated that the NFL chose to air a pre-recorded version of the song because "we felt there were too many risks to do it live." In an interview with the New York Post, Best said that what was played was "protection copy" (music recorded in advance to be used in the event of the singer's last-minute inability to sing) recorded by Houston several days before the game at an L.A. studio. In a February 4, 1991, article, Mary Jo Melone wrote: "It was the Memorex. The singing and music you heard were prerecorded."

Dan Klores, a spokesman for Houston, explained: "This is not a Milli Vanilli thing; she sang, but the microphone was turned off. It was a technical decision, partially based on the noise factor. This is standard procedure at these events." In 2001, Kathryn Holm McManus, former executive director of the orchestra, told the St. Petersburg Times that "everyone was playing, and Whitney was singing, but there were no live microphones. Everyone was lip-synching or finger-synching". Rickey Minor, who was Houston's musical director in 1991, confirmed in 2012 that while Houston had sung the anthem live, the audience had heard a pre-recorded version of the song.

In slight contrast, Super Bowl engineer Larry Estrin told USA Today in 1991 that TV viewers actually heard the studio version of the song "plus her live voice, plus the audience reaction". Estrin added, "She sang the melody and words the same way (as the studio version), but she sang her heart out."

However, Houston's personal publicist, Regina Brown, said, "Our understanding is Whitney sang live into a live microphone".

Mary Jo Melone commented, "This was the nation's most precious piece of music sung by one of its best performers at a most precarious time. If we were going to make such a deal of the moment, for the troops in Saudi Arabia, we should have heard the real thing. Or at least we should have been told we weren't." Songwriter and producer Jimmy Jam, in a 2004 interview with the Associated Press, said: "Whitney, when she did the national anthem, which was the greatest national anthem that we ever heard, what we heard over the air was prerecorded. The reason it was prerecorded was, that was a moment that no one wanted any mistakes. They didn't want any feedback, they didn't want any technical difficulties ... and it was great."

Cissy Houston and Robyn Crawford both insisted she sang live with Crawford adding that prior to Houston, artists like Diana Ross and Neil Diamond had used a backtrack themselves; stating she "[didn't] recall any performance of the national anthem similarly scrutinized" like Houston's.

In later years, when controversies arose involving lip-syncing by performers, Houston's Super Bowl performance was sometimes mentioned. When Jennifer Hudson performed a lip-synced version of "The Star Spangled Banner" at Super Bowl XLIII in February 2009, it caused some controversy. David Hinckley of the New York Daily News remarked: "The national anthem is different. Yes, it's a musical performance and yes, we're interested in how a Jennifer Hudson will interpret the song. That's why we remember the Whitney Houston and Marvin Gaye versions so well. Because the Super Bowl is primarily a television spectacle with a thousand moving parts, the producers years ago started asking to hear the anthem tracks a week before airtime, just so they would have one less potential variable. That's why [Jennifer Hudson] was lip-syncing."

=== Royalty dispute ===
The Florida Orchestra was originally not credited for the song. That originally did not cause a problem until the performance was determined to release as a single and donate any proceeds to a war-related charity by Arista Records. Although Ashley Sanford, a representative of Arista in New York, said everyone associated with the performance had been consulted before announcing plans for the recording, the plan came as a surprise to the orchestra. Kathryn Holm, then acting executive director for the orchestra, told St. Petersburg Times that "We were informed indirectly. We had heard something about it. But we didn't know anything had been decided." Arranger John Clayton was surprised as well, saying "I had heard some talk something might happen." Unlike Clayton, who was paid for his work, the orchestra was paid only for its expenses. The musicians and music director Jahja Ling donated their services. According to Holm, their contract gave permission only for a single broadcast of the performance. Holm said "I'm not an expert in this, so I don't know whether the radio or television stations have permission to broadcast it or not." The orchestra's original contract with the NFL, signed December in 1990, did not even mention subsequent releases. Holm demanded proper compensation from Arista for the contribution of the orchestra, then faced financial trouble and wanted a share of any profits from its Super Bowl performance, telling the Times that "Nobody anticipated the reaction, but part of the anthem's impact came from the arrangement behind it, so we believe our musicians deserve some restitution." Eventually, the orchestra received royalty payments in 1991 and 1992 of about $100,000, the St. Petersburg Times reported.

On December 14, 2001, the Florida Orchestra sued Arista Records for royalties from copies of the song re-released after Sept. 11 and placed on a Whitney Houston Greatest Hits album and videocassette. Leonard Stone, then orchestra executive director, said "It is a pity that we have to go to court on something so honorable and uplifting as the national anthem. [...] I suspect that Whitney Houston, if she knew, would be deeply hurt and offended as well. She was a friend of the orchestra," filing the lawsuit in Hillsborough Circuit Court asked a judge to enforce the terms of a 1991 agreement that requires Arista to pay the orchestra royalties on all sales worldwide of her rendition of "The Star-Spangled Banner." Under the agreement, the orchestra would get royalties of 5 percent on the suggested retail price of all copies of the song sold in the United States. The royalties would range from 2.5 to 4.25 percent in foreign countries. According to Stone, Arista was supposed to send the orchestra quarterly reports on the album's sales but the orchestra never received them, and no one at the orchestra knew that Houston's rendition of the song had been released in 2000 on her greatest hits album. Stone added that "the orchestra learned of the alleged contract breach after the anthem was reissued following the Sept. 11 terrorist attacks and quickly became a hot-selling single." Following the song's release after Sept. 11, orchestra attorney Frank Jakes began looking into the issue. Jakes, who negotiated the agreement with Arista in 1991, said that he sent Arista's general counsel letters and faxes but got no response, recalling how unwilling Arista had been to pay the orchestra a decade ago. However, thanks to both sides' efforts for resolution of the dispute, three days later (December 17, 2001), the suit was withdrawn by the orchestra voluntarily. The Arista spokesperson said "it was an administrative oversight from [Houston's] Greatest Hits album." An Arista representative assured Jakes who claimed that the non-profit organization had not received quarterly royalty statements since mid-1992, that the issue could be settled without legal action.

== Other live performances ==
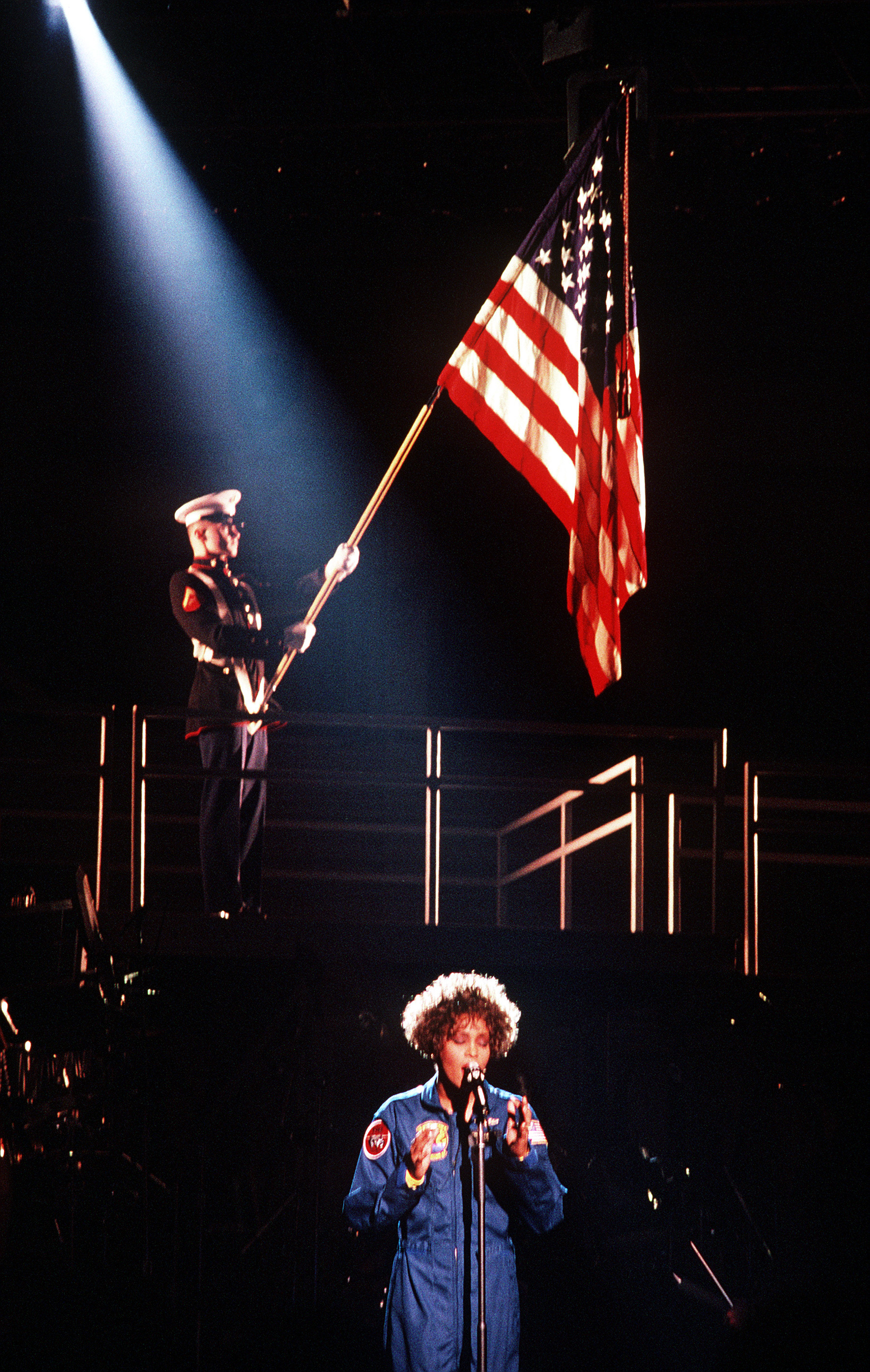
Houston opening the Welcome Home Heroes concert with "The Star Spangled Banner" on March 31, 1991

Prior to her famous rendition of "The Star Spangled Banner" at Super Bowl XXV in 1991, Houston performed the anthem at least twice before NBA games and would occasionally perform the anthem two more times after the Super Bowl performance.

On December 14, 1988, Houston took to the stage at Meadowlands Arena in East Rutherford, New Jersey, to perform an a capella rendition of the song that was received with cheers and applause prior to a regular season game between the Los Angeles Lakers and the New Jersey Nets.

Roughly two years later, on May 20, 1990, Houston performed the song without instrumental accompaniment again during game 3 of the 1990 NBA playoffs conference finals between the Chicago Bulls and the Detroit Pistons at The Palace of Auburn Hills in Detroit.

Two months after the Super Bowl performance, Houston opened her first-ever full-length TV concert, Welcome Home Heroes with Whitney Houston, with the anthem at Norfolk Naval Air Station in Norfolk, Virginia for a crowd of about 3,200 including Desert Storm troops and their families on March 31, 1991. Houston appeared initially alone under a spotlight singing the song without musical accompaniment in the first verse before her band joined in on the second verse.

Houston, in an interview with The Associated Press before the concert, said that her Super Bowl performance sparked a sense of patriotism in her and made her want to carry the song over into a concert. The concert was broadcast live nationally on HBO and simulcast on various US radio stations. It was watched by more than 50 million viewers for free instead of pay-per-view, resulting in becoming the most viewed live concert in HBO's history at the time. Houston would be nominated for an NAACP Image Award for the concert and would win a CableACE Award.

The performance was critically acclaimed with critics noting the similarities with the Super Bowl XXV performance, including Houston holding the note on the word "free" and performing melismata, for which Houston received praise for after her Super Bowl performance of the song.

Liz Smith of Newsday, after the controversy about Houston's lip-syncing at Super Bowl XXV, wrote that "anyone out there who still doubts Whitney's ability to vocally conquer 'The Star Spangled Banner' without technical help should tune in to HBO," praising Houston's Super Bowl performance highly as mentioned above. The performance was included in LaserDisc of the same title only, released in the United States in October 1991. (Note: The performance was not in even LaserDisc releases of the concert in foreign countries such Germany and Japan, as well as all of VHS and DVD releases since 1991.)

Eight years later, on July 14, 1999, during the middle of her My Love Is Your Love World Tour, Houston gave a live performance of the anthem in front of a sold-out crowd at the inaugural WNBA All-Star Game at Madison Square Garden in New York. George Willis of New York Post said that the performance was "nearly as stirring as when she sang before Super Bowl XXV in Tampa."

== Legacy and influence ==
=== Political and social impact ===
Cinque Henderson wrote in a 2016 article about Houston's Super Bowl performance in The New Yorker that Houston's rendition of the song was "the most influential performance of a national song since Marian Anderson sang "My Country, 'Tis of Thee" on the steps of the Lincoln Memorial on the eve of the Second World War." Henderson further added that while African Americans had used other patriotic songs such as "America the Beautiful" and "Lift Every Voice and Sing", few had used "The Star Spangled Banner" due to "the machinery of state violence" and stated Houston's version "inaugurated a change". As a result, Henderson claimed Houston's re-arrangement of the song helped to change African Americans' often-negative feelings about the national anthem, writing, "By making the idea of freedom the emotional and structural high point (not just the high note) of the anthem, Houston unlocked that iron door for black people and helped make the song a part of our cultural patrimony, too." He further explained that Houston's version "wasn't just a revolution in music; it was a revolution in meaning" and that Houston had "changed what it sounded like to be American".

Robyn Crawford, Houston's best friend and creative director at the time of the performance, stated Houston "forever raised the bar for the US national anthem", adding that her gospel inflections "claimed it for African Americans, many of whom felt a connection to it for the first time."

Writer Daphne A. Brooks wrote in her 2012 obituary on Houston for The Nation of her iconic performance of the Star Spangled Banner that by "not just hitting that note but living in it and by finally and absolutely killing it, Whitney Houston – a black woman born just weeks before the March on Washington, raised by pioneering artists like mother Cissy, cousin Dionne and godmother Aretha – willed herself into America's narrative of freedom and democracy through the sheer crushing command of her voice. That day, she staged a struggle on the battlefield of song and cemented her title as the voice of the post-civil rights era."

In 2021, Justin Kirkland of Esquire wrote of Houston's anthem, "This once in a generation performance transformed the way Americans hear 'The Star-Spangled Banner'." Kirkland also further explained the importance of Houston's rendition of the anthem to black Americans comparing it to her overall landmark career in pop and R&B music, writing that it "held a special importance for Black Americans. Sandwiched between the War on Drugs in the '80s, which disproportionately affected Black people and the 1992 Los Angeles riots, Houston's ascent and domination of a typically white-dominated pop landscape was a testament to Black excellence."

In the 2018 Kevin Macdonald documentary Whitney, Kenneth "Babyface" Edmonds said, "Hearing her sing The Star-Spangled Banner—she made people proud that they were Americans." Cinque Henderson was also interviewed for the documentary and added, "Black people always had a very fraught relationship to 'The Star Spangled Banner.' It’s a song about war, and the organs of state violence in the US have just as often been used against black people as they have against enemies. She had the radical impact of highlighting the theme of freedom."

Macdonald told Yahoo in 2018 that Houston's transitioning of the stately anthem into a soulful jazz-gospel hybrid was a major breakthrough, especially for black American listeners. "For African-Americans up to that point, the song had been kind of an uncomfortable thing," said Macdonald. "Various changes to the rhythm of the piece... gave her the opportunity to use her improvisational jazz/gospel flavors to make it a very gospely-sounding song with the emphasis on freedom, this great concept obviously for everyone in the world but particularly for African-Americans. Had she lived, she may have become America’s great jazz singer."

Macdonald further explained, "She changed forever the way that song is sung, and, more importantly, the way it’s understood. She turned it from being a song about oppression and about military might into a song that was celebrating freedom.”

Macdonald also claimed the performance cemented Houston's place as "America's Sweetheart" claiming, "It really, really cemented her place as America's sweetheart. ... She was this symbol of everything that was pure and sweet and lovely about America at that time. And then what happened later through her life was such a huge contrast. In that contrast, you see the real reason that people are fascinated with her."

In 2022, author and journalist Gerrick Kennedy wrote of Houston's performance in terms of her interpretation as a black artist in his book on Houston, Didn't We Almost Have It All: In Defense of Whitney Houston: "The sheer magnitude of Whitney’s voice and her transcendent performance turned the anthem into a moment of pure elation and pride for country. But she was a Black artist singing an anthem that was built on the horrific oppressions of her people, and there’s a burden that comes with that—even if Whitney didn't think about it when she stood on that stage and did what she did best."

Kennedy compared Houston's landmark performance to the early pro-slavery origins of lyricist Francis Scott Key's original 1814 composition and stated that Houston's performance was "the night she stole America’s heart and became a hero. There’s Whitney before the anthem and Whitney after—that’s just how big this thing got. An anthem born from the hands of a man who wanted to continue chattel slavery redefined by a Black woman whose majestic interpretation turned these lyrics into a Top 20 pop hit."

Kennedy further wrote of Houston's impact: "In those two minutes, Whitney became the embodiment of the ultimate American dream. She had reached the mountaintop, and the sheer magic of her voice moved the country to fall in love with itself a little deeper. And that is Blackness at its core. Whitney took the anthem, and all the darkness it casts down on Black folks, and transformed it into something that moved the world. In some ways, that night in Tampa was the Blackest thing Whitney has ever done—even if she, or any of us, didn't realize it then."

Mark Clague of The Conversation wrote that Houston's rendition "marked a turning point, both musically and socially", adding that it "was an ecstatic gospel ballad, a sacred hymn to the nation. Radiating a moment of optimism as the U.S.-led military of Operation Desert Storm dominated Iraqi forces in the Persian Gulf, Houston’s voice activated a renewed wave of patriotic pride."

Brandon Tensley of CNN called Houston's Star-Spangled Banner a "radical reclamation", writing "When Houston, clad in an unembellished yet no less iconic white tracksuit, stepped onto the field at Tampa Stadium in Florida to sing the national anthem, she didn't merely kick off one of the most-watched television programs in the US. She took an ode to freedom that was never created with Black liberation in mind – and reclaimed it. Three decades on, with the country engaged in a fresh reckoning with racial hierarchies, Houston’s performance feels just as inspiring as it must have been in 1991."

Sheila O'Malley of Politico called the live performance a "transcendental moment" and "one for the ages".

Timothy Yap of Jubilee Cast called Houston's rendition of "The Star-Spangled Banner" the "anthem of a generation" and that its 2001 Billboard recharting "reaffirm[ed] its status as one of the most iconic performances in American music history."

In 2021, ABC News correspondent David Muir stated of Houston's performance amid the uncertainty of the outcome of the Gulf War: "We were a nation on edge, even on a night when football is our escape, and one voice united us all."

In July 2026, singer John Rich of the country duo Big & Rich shared his thoughts on Houston's rendition on X after the Super Bowl performance was shared by Wesley Hunt on the app, stating "Good God Almighty… Whitney Houston might have given the greatest performance of our National Anthem of ALL TIME! Take three minutes and watch this today. My goodness…Makes me wanna cry."

=== Usage in media ===
In 2018, the performance was discussed in the Houston documentary, Whitney, in which vintage footage of the 1967 Newark riots that occurred when Houston was a child was compared to the success of Houston's transcendental performance.

The performance was dramatized for the Houston biopic, Whitney Houston: I Wanna Dance with Somebody (2022), showcasing black British actress Naomi Ackie as Houston performing the anthem with reactions from Houston's mother Cissy (Tamara Tunie), then-boyfriend Bobby Brown (Ashton Sanders), best friend Robyn Crawford (Nafessa Williams), American troops watching the performance at their base in Kuwait and several viewers watching at their homes.

In the same year, ESPN aired a thirty-minute documentary on the anthem titled Whitney's Anthem, which aired on the tenth anniversary of Houston's death.

Folk rock singer and guitarist Matt Nathanson's 2024 song "Whitney Houston's National Anthem", a duet with the Indigo Girls, on his album, King of (Un)Simple, references Houston's Super Bowl XXV performance and uses the "America's Sweetheart" moniker to depict her.

=== Influence on other artists ===
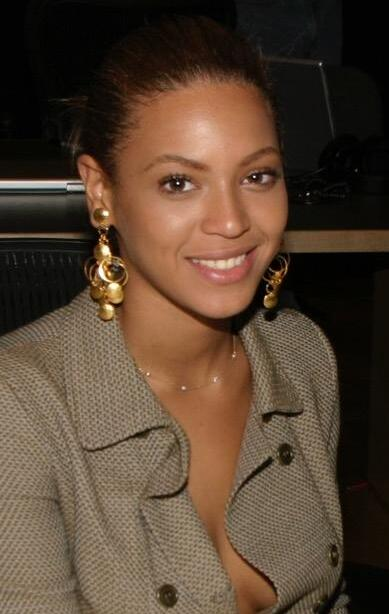
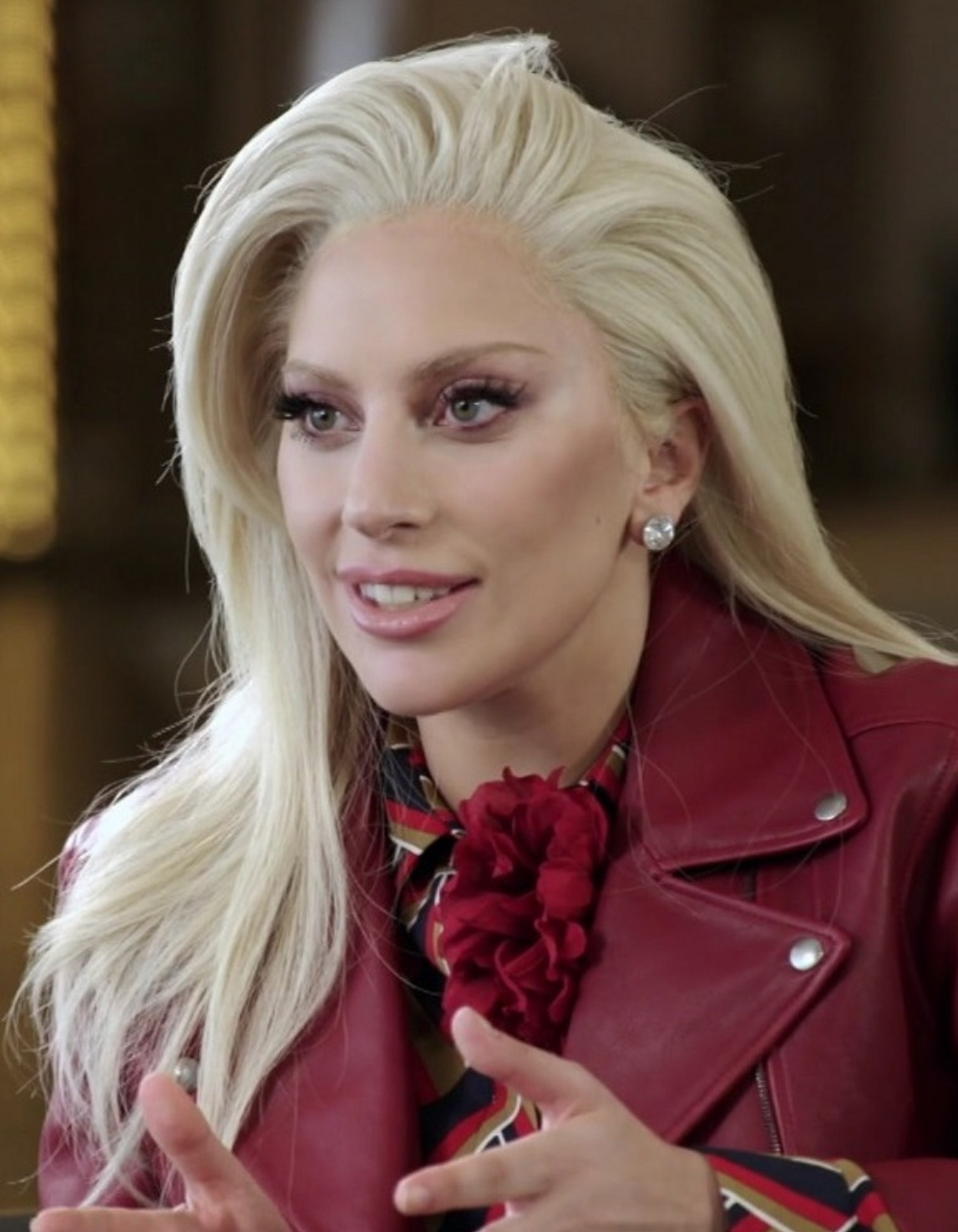
Beyoncé (left) and Lady Gaga (right) were among the many singers influenced by Houston's version to do their own rendition.

Two weeks after Houston's performance, jazz musician Branford Marsalis performed a Houston-inspired instrumental rendition of the anthem with pianist Bruce Hornsby at the 1991 NBA All-Star Game. Marsalis, like Houston, also performed a slower version of the anthem and holding a high note on his saxophone similar to Houston on the word "free", which Henderson wrote, "[made] the note (and the word) the emotional high point of the song."

Henderson further wrote that singers such as Justin Timberlake, Christina Aguilera, Jennifer Hudson, Patti LaBelle and Mariah Carey have all attempted to match Houston's vocal flourish on the word "free" near the end of the song in their respective versions, with the latter four having performed the anthem at various Super Bowl games.

Beyoncé, who performed "The Star-Spangled Banner" at Super Bowl XXXVIII in 2004, referred to Houston's Super Bowl anthem as a big influence on her. The musical arrangement of her performance, composed by Randy Waldman, incorporated several quotations of Houston's performance into the orchestral accompaniment. Speaking later about the experience on The Oprah Winfrey Show, originally aired on April 5, 2004: "Even more so than the Grammys, singing The Star-Spangled Banner, the national anthem, has always been a dream. [As a child,] I watched Whitney Houston, and I literally was in tears. And I grew up saying, 'Mom, I'm going to do that.'...I actually did it! It was overwhelming. It was amazing, it really was."

American soprano Renée Fleming's performance of the Star Spangled Banner at Super Bowl XLVIII in 2014 was compared to Houston's by Cinque Henderson, who wrote that when Fleming reached the word "free", she "rais[ed] her arm with gospel feeling, nailing the high note, then tightening her voice to send it vaulting into the heavens on the wings of Houston’s ghost", holding the flourish for "eight counts. To borrow from the critic Helen Vendler, it was as if, twenty-five years ago, those notes that Houston wrote into the song were somehow simply hiding in the air waiting to be found and, once Houston had seen and sung them, they would never be hidden again."

Lady Gaga, in an exclusive interview with CNN-IBN, answered the question about her mention of Houston's name in her Grammy award acceptance speech in 2011 that "Whitney was my major vocal inspiration when I was young. We used to listen to her rendition of 'The Star Spangled Banner' over and over again. She has an angel in her throat, and I promised myself that the first time I win a Grammy that I would thank Whitney on TV. I did that last year too, but that was not on TV. So this year I had to thank her again." Gaga later performed Houston-inspired renditions of the anthem during Super Bowl 50 in 2016 and the inauguration of President Joe Biden in January 2021.

In 2018, Pink performed the Star Spangled Banner at Super Bowl LII, accomplishing a dream to perform the anthem after being inspired by Houston performing the anthem at Super Bowl XXV, despite being sick with influenza at the time. Her rendition was compared to Houston's.

Brandy Norwood performed the national anthem during the NFC Championship game at SoFi Stadium in Inglewood, California in January 2022 and was claimed to have channeled Houston's performance during her own performance, even wearing a similar tracksuit.

Singer Coco Jones, who performed "Lift Every Voice and Sing" at Super Bowl LX, was spotted wearing a tracksuit similar to Houston's in honor of the singer's Super Bowl XXV outfit.

Fellow New Jersey musician Charlie Puth delivered his rendition of the national anthem during the same Super Bowl on February 8, 2026 with jazz saxophonist Kenny G, 35 years after Houston's rendition and performed the song in a similar slower rendition as hers. Afterwards, Puth admitted he wanted to honor Houston with his rendition, saying he "wrote the arrangement in a very specific way". Before the performance, Puth told Rolling Stone that he was "going to be inspired by what Whitney did, but I can't ever touch what Whitney did," adding that he regards Houston's performance as "the best one ever done – that and the Chris Stapleton one [in 2023]. That was raw. It was wonderful. Made men cry. But the Whitney version, man, no one will ever touch that."

== Formats and track listings ==
- US CD single (1991 version) / US cassette single
1. "The Star Spangled Banner" – 2:17
2. "America the Beautiful" – 1:32
- US 7" vinyl single
  - A "The Star Spangled Banner" – 2:15
  - B "America the Beautiful" – 1:31
- US CD single (2001 version) / EU CD single
1. "The Star Spangled Banner" – 2:14
2. "America the Beautiful" – 1:31
- Video single / VHS
1. Running time – 4 minutes 30 seconds

== Credits and personnel ==
Credits adapted from "The Star Spangled Banner" single liner notes.

"The Star Spangled Banner"

- Musical arrangement – John Clayton, Jr. featuring the Florida Orchestra conducted by Maestro Jahja Ling
- Vocal arrangements – Whitney Houston

"America the Beautiful"

- Rhythm arrangement inspired by Ray Charles
- Background vocals – Perri
- Vocal arrangements – Whitney Houston
- Producer – Ricky Minor and Whitney Houston

== Charts and certifications ==
=== Weekly charts ===
Chart (1991)	Peak position
US Billboard Hot 100	20
US Adult Contemporary (Billboard)	48

Chart (2001)	Peak position
Canada (Nielsen SoundScan)	5
US Billboard Hot 100	6
US Hot R&B/Hip-Hop Songs (Billboard)	30

=== Year-end charts ===
Chart (2001)	Position
Canada (Nielsen SoundScan)	166
US Hot 100 Singles Sales (Billboard)	21
US Hot R&B/Hip-Hop Singles Sales (Billboard)	48

=== Certifications ===
Region	Year	Format	Certification(s)
United States (RIAA)	1991	Single	Gold
United States (RIAA)	1991	Video single	2× Platinum
United States (RIAA)	2001	Single	Platinum

== Notes ==
=== Sources ===
- Crawford, Robyn (2019). A Song for You: My Life with Whitney Houston. Dutton. ISBN 978-1-52474-284-3.
- Heppermann, Christine (2012). Whitney Houston: Recording Artist & Actress. ABDO Publishing. ISBN 9781614801733.
- Kooijman, Jaap (2008). Fabricating the Absolute Fake: America in Contemporary Pop Culture. Amsterdam: Amsterdam University Press. ISBN 978-90-5356-492-9.
- Seal, Richard (1994). Whitney Houston: One Moment in Time. Britannia Press Publishing. ISBN 0-9519937-8-X.
