= List of catchphrases in American and British mass media =

This is a list of catchphrases found in American and British english language television and film, where a catchphrase is a short phrase or expression that has gained usage beyond its initial scope. These are not merely catchy sayings. Even though some sources may identify a phrase as a catchphrase, this list is for those that meet the definition given in the lead section of the catchphrase article and are notable for their widespread use within the culture.

This list is distinct from the list of political catchphrases.

== In British culture ==
Notable catchphrases in British culture
| Catchphrase | Character/person | Media source | First appearance | Notes |
|---|---|---|---|---|
| "Bernie, the bolt!" | Bob Monkhouse | The Golden Shot | 1967 | |
| "Ooh, you are awful ... but I like you!" | Dick Emery | The Dick Emery Show | 1963 | |
| "You might very well think that; I couldn't possibly comment" | Francis Urquhart | House of Cards | 1990 | |
| "Don't panic!" | Lance-Corporal Jones | Dad's Army | 1968 | |
| "You are the Weakest Link. Goodbye!" | Anne Robinson | The Weakest Link | 2000 | |
| "Would you like a jelly baby?" | The Fourth Doctor | Doctor Who | 1974 | |
| "Fantastic!" | The Ninth Doctor | Doctor Who | 2005 | |
| "Allons-y!" | The Tenth Doctor | Doctor Who | 2006 | |
| "The Chase is on!" | Bradley Walsh | The Chase | 2009 | |
| "Is that your final answer?" | Chris Tarrant | Who Wants to Be a Millionaire? | 1998 | |
| "Permission to Speak, Sir!" | Lance-Corporal Jones | Dad's Army | 1968 | |
| "They don't like it up 'em!" | Lance-Corporal Jones | Dad's Army | 1968 | |
| "You stupid boy" | Captain George Mainwaring | Dad's Army | 1968 | |
| "Are you having a laugh?" | Andy Millman | Extras | 2006 | |
| "I don't believe it!" | Victor Meldrew | One Foot in the Grave | 1990 | |
| "I'm Free" | Mr. Humphries | Are You Being Served? | 1972 | |
| "Ooh Betty" | Frank Spencer | Some Mothers Do 'Ave 'Em | 1973 | |
| "It's good night from me..." "...and it's good night from him" | Ronnie Corbett and Ronnie Barker | The Two Ronnies | 1971 | |
| "Nice to see you, to see you ... nice" | Sir Bruce Forsyth | The Generation Game | 1971 | |
| "Didn't he/she/they do well?" | Sir Bruce Forsyth | The Generation Game | 1971 | |
| "Shut that door!" | Larry Grayson | The Generation Game | 1978 | |
| "What a gay day!" | Larry Grayson | The Generation Game | 1978 | |
| "Seems like a nice boy!" | Larry Grayson | The Generation Game | 1978 | |
| "Look at the muck on 'ere!" | Larry Grayson | The Generation Game | 1978 | |
| "You dirty old man" | Harold Steptoe | Steptoe and Son | 1962 | |
| "(Three words:) Fab-u-LOUS!" | Craig Revel Horwood | Strictly Come Dancing | 2004 | |
| "A complete dahnce di-SAH-ster" | Craig Revel Horwood | Strictly Come Dancing | 2004 | |
| "Absolute filth . . . and I LOVED it!" | Craig Revel Horwood | Strictly Come Dancing | 2004 | |
| "You'll like it, not a lot . . . but you'll like it" | Paul Daniels | The Paul Daniels Magic Show | 1979 | |
| "Let's get the boys on the baize!" | Rob Walker | BBC TV snooker coverage | 2008 | |
| "Are you ready? Ladies and Gentlemen! Let's...Play...DARTS!" | Martin Fitzmaurice & Lakeside audience | Darts World Championships | 1985 | |
| "A real bobby-dazzler" | David Dickinson | Bargain Hunt and Dickinson's Real Deal | 2004? | |
| "Cheap as chips" | David Dickinson | Bargain Hunt and Dickinson's Real Deal | 2004? | |
| "Can you hear me, mother?" | Sandy Powell | Radio | 1930 | |
| "Does my bum look big in this?" | Arabella Weir | The Fast Show | 1994 | |
| "I'll get me coat" | Mark Williams | The Fast Show | 1994 | |
| "Silly Old Moo!" | Alf Garnett | Till Death Us Do Part | 1965 | |
| "Listen Very Carefully, I Shall Say This Only Once" | Michelle Dubois | 'Allo 'Allo! | 1982 | |
| "Lovely jubbly" | Del Boy | Only Fools and Horses | 1981 | |
| "During the war..." | Uncle Albert | Only Fools and Horses | 1985 | |
| "Eh! Eh! Alright! Alright! Calm down! Calm down!" | Harry Enfield | Harry Enfield's Television Programme | 1990 | |
| "Is it cos I is Black?" | Ali G | Da Ali G Show | 2000 | |
| "Exterminate" | Dalek | Doctor Who | 1963 | |
| "How very dare you!" | Derek Faye | The Catherine Tate Show | 2004 | |
| "Am I bovvered?" | Lauren Cooper | The Catherine Tate Show | 2004 | |
| "What a Fucking Liberty!" | Joanie Taylor | The Catherine Tate Show | 2004 | |
| "Computer says no" | Carol Beer | Little Britain | 2003 | |
| "I have a cunning plan" | Baldrick | Blackadder | 1983 | |
| "Hello, sweetie." | River Song | Doctor Who | 2008 | |
| "Spoilers." | River Song | Doctor Who | 2008 | |
| "Keep dancing!" | Sir Bruce Forsyth, Tess Daly, Claudia Winkleman | Strictly Come Dancing | 2004 | |
| "Let’s release the balls!" | Alan Dedicoat | The National Lottery Live | 1996 | |
| "Uh-oh, catastrophe!" and "Yes, triumph!" | Gaspard and Lisa | Gaspard and Lisa | 2011 | |

== In American culture ==
Catchphrases from events, interviews, and commercials are not included.

Notable catchphrases in American culture
| Catchphrase | Character | Series | First appearance | Notes |
|---|---|---|---|---|
| "Aaay!" | Fonzie | Happy Days | 1974 | |
| "And that's the way it is." | Walter Cronkite | CBS Evening News | 1963 | |
| "Ay caramba!" | Bart Simpson | The Simpsons | 1988 | |
| "Baby, you're the greatest" | Ralph Kramden | The Honeymooners | 1955 | |
| "Bam!" | Emeril Lagasse | Emeril Live | | |
| "Bang, zoom, straight to the moon" | Ralph Kramden | The Honeymooners | 1955 | |
| "Bazinga!" | Sheldon Cooper | The Big Bang Theory | 2007 | |
| "Bite my shiny metal ass!" | Bender Rodriguez | Futurama | 1999 | |
| "Blam!" | Bitch Pudding | Robot Chicken | | |
| "Book 'em, Danno!" | Steve McGarrett | Hawaii Five-O | 1968 | |
| "Clear eyes, full hearts, can't lose" | Coach Taylor | Friday Night Lights | 2006 | |
| "Come on down!" | Johnny Olson | The Price is Right | 1972 | |
| "Cut it out" | Joey Gladstone | Full House | 1987 | |
| "Damn you, vile woman!" | Stewie Griffin | Family Guy | 1999 | |
| "Danger, Will Robinson" | Robot | Lost in Space | 1965 | |
| "De plane! De plane!" | Tattoo | Fantasy Island | 1977 | |
| "Denny Crane" | Denny Crane | Boston Legal | | |
| "Did I do that?" | Steve Urkel | Family Matters | | |
| "D'oh!" | Homer Simpson | The Simpsons | 1988 | |
| "Don't make me angry. You wouldn't like me when I'm angry." | David Banner | The Incredible Hulk | | |
| "Dude." | Hugo "Hurley" Reyes | Lost | 2004 | |
| "Dy-no-mite!" | J.J. Evans | Good Times | 1974 | |
| "Eat my shorts" | Bart Simpson | The Simpsons | 1990 | |
| "Elizabeth, I'm coming!" (Note: Full quote: "Elizabeth, I'm coming to join you honey") | Fred Sanford | Sanford and Son | | |
| "Everybody Lies" | Dr. Gregory House | House | 2004 | |
| "Gee, Mrs. Cleaver" | Eddie Haskell | Leave it to Beaver | | |
| "Giggity-giggity-goo!" | Glenn Quagmire | Family Guy | 1999 | |
| "God'll get you for that" | Maude | Maude | 1972 | |
| "Good night, and good luck" | Edward R. Murrow | See It Now | | |
| "Goodnight, everybody!" | Yakko Warner | Animaniacs | 1993 | |
| "Good night, John Boy" | | The Waltons | 1971 | |
| "Have Mercy" | Jesse Katsopolis | Full House | | |
| "Heh-heh" | Beavis and Butt-Head | Beavis and Butt-head | | |
| "Hello there, children!" | Jerome "Chef" McElroy | South Park | 1997 | |
| "Here it is, your moment of Zen" | | The Daily Show | 1996 | |
| "Here's Johnny" | Ed McMahon | The Tonight Show Starring Johnny Carson | 1962 | |
| "Hey now!" | Hank Kingsley | The Larry Sanders Show | | |
| "Hey hey hey!" (Note: Dwayne Nelson's "Hey hey hey" catchphrase in What's Happening!! emphasizes the second hey) | Dwayne Nelson | What's Happening!! | | |
| "Hey hey hey!" | Fat Albert | Fat Albert | | |
| "Holy (whatever), Batman!" | Robin | Batman | 1966 | |
| "Holy crap!" | Frank Barone | Everybody Loves Raymond | | |
| "How rude!" | Stephanie Tanner | Full House | 1987 | |
| "Homey don't play that!" | Homey the Clown | In Living Color | | |
| 'How sweet it is!" | Jackie Gleason | The Jackie Gleason Show | | |
| "How you doin'?" | Joey Tribbiani | Friends | 1994 | |
| "I know nothing!" | Sgt. Schultz | Hogan's Heroes | | |
| "I love it when a plan comes together" | John "Hannibal" Smith | The A-Team | 1982 | |
| "I'm Larry, this is my brother Darryl ..." (Note: Full quote: "I'm Larry, this is my brother Darryl, and this is my other brother Darryl") | Larry | Newhart | | |
| "I'm listening" | Frasier Crane | Frasier | | |
| "I'm ready!" | SpongeBob SquarePants | SpongeBob SquarePants | 1999 | |
| "I'm Rick James, bitch!" | Dave Chappelle as Rick James | Chappelle's Show | 2004 | |
| "If it weren't for you meddling kids!" | Various villains | Scooby Doo, Where Are You! | 1969 | |
| "Is that your final answer?" | Regis Philbin | Who Wants to Be a Millionaire? | 1999 | |
| "It's a good thing" | Martha Stewart | Martha Stewart Living | | |
| "It’s morphin’ time!" | Various characters | Mighty Morphin' Power Rangers | 1993 | |
| "Jane, you ignorant slut" | Dan Aykroyd to Jane Curtin | Weekend Update / Saturday Night Live | | |
| "Just one more thing..." | Columbo | Columbo | 1971 | |
| "Kiss my grits!" | Flo | Alice | 1976 | |
| "Legendary" | Barney Stinson | How I Met Your Mother | 2005 | |
| "Let's be careful out there" | Sgt. Esterhaus | Hill Street Blues | 1981 | |
| "Let's move people" | Sasha | Bratz | 2005 | |
| "Look! Up in the sky! It's a bird! It's a plane! It's Superman!" | | Adventures of Superman | 1952 | |
| "Live long and prosper" | Spock | Star Trek | 1966 | |
| "Make it so" | Jean-Luc Picard | Star Trek: The Next Generation | 1987 | |
| "Make it work" | Tim Gunn | Project Runway | | |
| "Makin' whoopee" | Bob Eubanks | The Newlywed Game | | |
| "Marcia, Marcia, Marcia!" | Jan Brady | The Brady Bunch | | |
| "Mom always liked you best" | Tommy Smothers | The Smothers Brothers Comedy Hour | | |
| "Mother of Pink!" and "Chop chop!" | Burdine Maxwell | Bratz | 2005 | |
| "Na-Nu, Na-Nu" | Mork | Mork & Mindy | 1978 | |
| "Never assume ..." | Felix Unger | The Odd Couple | | |
| "Nip it!" (Note: Full quote: "Nip it in the bud!") | Barney Fife | The Andy Griffith Show | | |
| "No soup for you!" | The Soup Nazi | Seinfeld | 1995 | |
| "Norm!" | | Cheers | 1982 | |
| "Now cut that out!" | Jack Benny | The Jack Benny Program | | |
| "Oh my God, they killed Kenny!" "You bastards!" | Stan Marsh and Kyle Broflovski | South Park | 1997 | |
| "Oh, my nose!" | Marcia Brady | The Brady Bunch | | |
| "Oww! My nose!" | Kaycee | Bratz | 2005 | |
| "Pow! Right in the kisser!" | Ralph Kramden | The Honeymooners | 1955 | |
| "Resistance is futile" | Borg | Star Trek: The Next Generation | | |
| "Ruh-roh" | Astro (and Scooby-Doo) | The Jetsons / Scooby-Doo | | |
| "Say good night, Gracie" | George Burns | The Burns & Allen Show | | |
| "Schwing!" | Wayne and Garth | Wayne's World / Saturday Night Live | | |
| "Screw you guys, I'm going home!" | Eric Cartman | South Park | 1997 | |
| "Shut up, Meg." | Peter Griffin | Family Guy | 1999 | |
| "Smile, you're on Candid Camera" | | Candid Camera | | |
| "Sock it to me!" | | Rowan & Martin's Laugh-In | 1968 | |
| "Space, the final frontier ..." | Captain Kirk | Star Trek: The Original Series | 1966 | |
| "Stifle!" | Archie Bunker | All in the Family | 1971 | |
| "Suit up!" | Barney Stinson | How I Met Your Mother | | |
| "Tell me what you don't like about yourself" | Dr. McNamara and Dr. Troy | Nip/Tuck | 2003 | |
| "Thank you veddy much" | Latka Gravas | Taxi | | |
| "That would be so cool! So cool" | Arthur Kensington Jr., "The Nerd" | Robot Chicken | | |
| "That's hot" | Paris Hilton | The Simple Life | | |
| "That's what she said!" | Michael Scott | The Office | | |
| "The thrill of victory, the agony of defeat" | Jim McKay | ABC's Wide World of Sports | | |
| "The Tribe has spoken." | Jeff Probst | Survivor | 2000 | |
| "The truth is out there" | Fox Mulder | The X-Files | | |
| "This is the city ..." | Joe Friday | Dragnet | 1951 | |
| "This tape will self-destruct in five seconds." | | Mission: Impossible | 1966 | |
| "To the Batmobile!" | Batman | Batman | 1966 | |
| "Two thumbs up" | Siskel & Ebert | At the Movies | 1986 | |
| "Up your nose with a rubber hose" | Vinnie Barbarino | Welcome Back, Kotter | 1975 | |
| "We are two wild and crazy guys!" | Steve Martin and Dan Aykroyd as Czech playboys | Saturday Night Live | | |
| "Welcome to the O.C., bitch" | Luke Ward | The O.C. | | |
| "Well, isn't that special?" | The Church Lady | Saturday Night Live | | |
| "We've got a really big show!" | Ed Sullivan | The Ed Sullivan Show | | |
| "We've got a situation." | Mike "the Situation" Sorrentino | Jersey Shore | | |
| "What'choo talkin' 'bout, Willis?" | Arnold Jackson | Diff'rent Strokes | 1978 | |
| "What you see is what you get!" | Geraldine Jones | The Flip Wilson Show | | |
| "Who loves ya, baby?" | Kojak | Kojak | 1973 | |
| "Why you little…!" | Homer Simpson | The Simpsons | 1988 | |
| "Will you accept this rose?" | | The Bachelor | | |
| "Works for me" | Rick Hunter | Hunter | 2004 | |
| "Would you believe...?" | Maxwell Smart | Get Smart | 1965 | |
| "Wubba Lubba Dub-Dub" | Rick Sanchez | Rick and Morty | 2013 | |
| "Yabba dabba doo!" | Fred Flintstone | The Flintstones | 1960 | |
| "Yada, yada, yada" | Elaine Benes | Seinfeld, episode "The Yada Yada" | 1997 | |
| "Yeah, that's the ticket" | Tommy Flanagan, the Pathological Liar | Saturday Night Live | | |
| "You eediot!" | Ren Hoek | Ren & Stimpy | 1991 | |
| "You look mahvelous" | Billy Crystal as Fernando | Saturday Night Live | | |
| "You big dummy!" | Fred Sanford | Sanford and Son | 1972 | |
| "You got it, dude!" | Michelle Tanner | Full House | 1987 | |
| "You rang?" | Lurch | The Addams Family | | |
| "You're fired!" | Donald Trump | The Apprentice | 2004 | |
| "You've got spunk ..." | Lou Grant | The Mary Tyler Moore Show | | |

== In cinema ==
Notable catchphrases in cinema
| Catchphrase | Character | Movie | First appearance | Notes |
|---|---|---|---|---|
| "I'll be back" | Terminator | The Terminator | 1984 | (Note: 1. 1 on Time Magazine's top 10 catchphrases.) (Note: 1. 37 on the American Film Institute's top 100 Movie Quotes.) |
| "Hasta la vista, baby" | Terminator | Terminator 2: Judgment Day | 1991 | (Note: 1. 76 on the American Film Institute's top 100 Movie Quotes.) |
| "I love the smell of napalm in the morning" | Lieutenant Colonel Bill Kilgore | Apocalypse Now | 1979 | |
| "Frankly, my dear, I don't give a damn" | Rhett Butler | Gone with the Wind | 1939 | (Note: 1. 2 on Time Magazine's top 10 catchphrases.) (Note: 1. 1 on the American Film Institute's top 100 Movie Quotes.) |
| "Here's looking at you, kid" | Rick Blaine | Casablanca | 1942 | (Note: 1. 6 on Time Magazine's top 10 catchphrases.) (Note: 1. 5 on the American Film Institute's top 100 Movie Quotes.) |
| "I'm going to make him an offer he can't refuse" | Don Vito Corleone | The Godfather | 1972 | (Note: 1. 10 on Time Magazine's top 10 catchphrases.) (Note: 1. 2 on the American Film Institute's top 100 Movie Quotes.) |
| "Go ahead, make my day" | Harry Callahan | Sudden Impact | 1983 | (Note: 1. 6 on the American Film Institute's top 100 Movie Quotes.) |
| "You've got to ask yourself one question: Do I feel lucky? Well, do ya, punk?" | Harry Callahan | Dirty Harry | 1971 | |
| "Snooch to the nooch!"; "Snoogans!" | Jay | View Askewniverse | 1994-2022 | |
| "You talkin' to me?" | Travis Bickle | Taxi Driver | 1976 | (Note: 1. 10 on the American Film Institute's top 100 Movie Quotes.) |
| "Yippee ki yay, motherfucker" | John McClane | Die Hard | 1988 | (Note: 1. 96 on Premiere magazine's top 100 Greatest Movie Lines.) |
| "Say hello to my little friend" | Tony Montana | Scarface | 1983 | (Note: 1. 61 on American Film Institute's top 100 Movie Quotes.) |
| "Release the Kraken!" | Zeus | Clash of the Titans | 2010 | |
| "Bond, James Bond" | James Bond | Dr No | 1962 | |
| "We have ways to make men talk" | Mohammed Khan | The Lives of a Bengal Lancer | 1935 | |

== See also ==
- AFI's 100 Years...100 Movie Quotes
- List of Internet memes
