= "Holy..." =

Exclamation of surprise

"Holy...!" (for example "Holy shit!", "Holy mackerel!" or "Holy smoke!", and perhaps most commonly "Holy cow!") is an exclamation of surprise used mostly in English-speaking countries.

Robin of the Batman TV series is noted for his many catchphrase "Holy..." exclamations. The lines in the 1960s TV series were uttered by Robin actor Burt Ward and were directly related to the plot; for example, "Holy Graf Zeppelin!" is uttered by Robin upon seeing an aerial balloon. In his cameo on the Arrowverse crossover "Crisis on Infinite Earths", Burt Ward exclaims, "Holy crimson skies of death!" while Earth-66 experiences red skies due to the incoming antimatter wave.

== Analysis ==
Bradley J. Ricca, comic book scholar at Case Western Reserve University, suggests that: "Robin exists as a media entity inextricably linked with Batman and shares nearly as much ubiquity in American culture". He considers Robin's famous "Holy..." catchphrases to have been grossly overused in the series, popularizing it in the American vernacular. Cartoons such as Super Friends continued to make use of Robin and his catchphrases, "spouting 'Holy' in front of every noun imaginable" and Robin's exclamations still remain closely associated with his character in popular culture.

American author David Shields notes how much in contrast Robin's "Holy..." outbursts, his alliteration and assonance, his fast riffs were to the laconic Batman. According to film critics Deborah Cartmell and Imelda Whelehan, Robin's quip "Holey Rusted Metal!" in Batman Forever was an "explicit in-joke". Camp humour, through Robin's exclamations and other circumstances in the Batman series, have led some commentators to speculate on homosexual undertones in the relationship between Batman and Robin. Image Entertainment paid homage to Robin's quips with the title "Batman: Holy Batmania" in a 2004 2-disc DVD release containing four documentaries discussing the sixties TV series. The DVD title is the name of one of the documentaries itself.

== See also ==
- Captain Haddock
