= Lloyd discography =

- Studio albums: 5
- Extended plays: 2
- Singles: 12
- Music videos: 18
- Featured singles: 16

This is a discography for the singer Lloyd.

== Albums ==
=== Studio albums ===
List of studio albums, with selected chart positions and certifications
Title	Album details	Peak chart positions			Sales	Certifications
Title	Album details	US	US R&B	UK	Sales	Certifications
Southside	Released: July 20, 2004; Label: The Inc., Def Jam; Formats: CD, LP, digital download	11	3	—	US: 67,000 (first week sales)	RIAA: Gold
Street Love	Released: March 13, 2007; Label: The Inc., Universal Motown; Formats: CD, digital download	2	2	118		RIAA: Platinum; RMNZ: Gold
Lessons in Love	Released: August 5, 2008; Label: The Inc., Universal Motown; Formats: CD, digital download	7	1	81	US: 51,000 (first week sales	
King of Hearts	Released: July 5, 2011; Label: Zone 4, Interscope; Formats: CD, digital download	10	5	—	US: 35,600	RMNZ: Gold
Tru	Released: August 31, 2018; Label: Young Goldie, Empire; Formats: CD, digital download	— (Note: Tru LP reached number 90 on Billboard's United States Top Current Albums chart, not the regular Billboard 200 that also includes catalog albums in addition to current records.)	—	—		
"—" denotes a recording that did not chart or was not released in that territory.

== Extended plays ==
List of extended plays, with chart position
Title	Details	Peak chart position
Title	Details	US R&B
Like Me: The Young Goldie EP	Released: December 14, 2009; Label: Young Goldie; Format: Digital download	—
Tru EP	Released: December 9, 2016; Label: Young Goldie, Empire; Formats: Digital download	20
"—" denotes a recording that did not chart or was not released in that territory.

== Mixtapes ==
Title	Album details
The Playboy Diaries	Released: October 29, 2012; Label: Young Goldie; Format: Digital download

== Singles ==
=== As lead artist ===
List of singles as lead artist, with selected chart positions and certifications, showing year released and album name
Title	Year	Peak chart positions										Certifications	Album
Title	Year	US	US R&B	AUS	AUT	CAN	DEN	IRL	NLD	NZ	UK	Certifications	Album
"Southside" (featuring Ashanti)	2004	24	13	—	—	—	—	—	—	—	—	RIAA: Platinum; MC: Gold; RMNZ: Gold	Southside
"Hey Young Girl"	2004	—	61	—	—	—	—	—	—	—	—		Southside
"You" (featuring Lil Wayne)	2006	9	1	—	—	—	—	—	—	25	45	RIAA: 4× Platinum; BPI: Platinum; MC: 2× Platinum; RMNZ: 3× Platinum	Street Love
"Get It Shawty"	2007	16	4	—	—	—	—	—	—	—	72	RIAA: 2× Platinum; MC: Gold; RMNZ: Gold	Street Love
"Player's Prayer"	2007	—	74	—	—	—	—	—	—	—	—		Street Love
"How We Do It (Around My Way)" (featuring Ludacris)	2008	—	77	—	—	—	—	—	—	—	75		Lessons in Love
"Girls Around the World" (featuring Lil Wayne)	2008	64	13	—	—	—	—	—	—	—	—		Lessons in Love
"Year of the Lover"	2008	—	—	—	—	—	—	—	—	—	—		Lessons in Love
"Lay It Down"	2010	64	7	—	—	—	—	—	—	—	—	RIAA: Platinum; MC: Gold; RMNZ: Platinum	King of Hearts
"Cupid"	2011	—	11	—	—	—	—	—	—	—	—		King of Hearts
"Dedication to My Ex (Miss That)" (featuring André 3000 and Lil Wayne)	2011	79	43	3	6	33	7	5	6	14	3	ARIA: 3× Platinum; BPI: Gold; IFPI DEN: Gold; RIANZ: Gold	King of Hearts
"Tru"	2016	—	49	—	—	—	—	—	—	—	—	RIAA: Platinum	Tru
"Slow Wine Bass Line" (featuring Teddy Riley)	2020	—	—	—	—	—	—	—	—	—	—		Non-album singles
"All I Need	2021	—	—	—	—	—	—	—	—	—	—	RMNZ: Gold	Non-album singles
"—" denotes that the single did not chart or was not released in the territory.

=== As featured artist ===
List of singles as featured artist, with selected chart positions and certifications, showing year released and album name
Title	Year	Peak chart positions									Certifications	Album
Title	Year	US	US R&B	US Rap	AUS	IRE	NL	NZ	SWI	UK	Certifications	Album
"Forever" (8Ball & MJG featuring Lloyd)	2004	—	—	—	—	—	—	—	—	—		Living Legends
"Let's Cheat" (Tango Redd featuring Lloyd)	2004	—	—	—	—	—	—	—	—	—		Non-album single
"Caught Up" (Ja Rule featuring Lloyd)	2005	—	65	—	34	20	80	—	—	20		R.U.L.E.
"When I Hustle" (Huey featuring Lloyd)	2007	—	80	—	—	—	—	—	—	—		Notebook Paper
"Secret Admirer" (Pitbull featuring Lloyd)	2007	—	—	—	—	—	—	30	—	—		The Boatlift
"Turn Heads" (Dem Franchize Boyz featuring Lloyd)	2008	—	75	—	—	—	—	—	—	—	RMNZ: Platinum	Our World, Our Way
"The Dedication (Ay DJ)" (Jibbs featuring Lloyd)	2009	—	85	—	—	—	—	—	—	—		New Tempo, New Swag
"BedRock" (Young Money featuring Lloyd)	2009	2	2	1	—	17	—	21	—	9	RIAA: 7× Platinum; BPI: Platinum; RMNZ: 2× Platinum	We Are Young Money
"Boss Chick" (S. Fresh featuring Lloyd and Lola Monroe)	2010	—	—	—	—	—	—	—	—	—		Non-album single
"Any Girl" (Lloyd Banks featuring Lloyd)	2010	—	52	24	—	—	—	—	—	—		H.F.M. 2 (The Hunger for More 2)
"Feelin' Myself" (Nipsey Hussle featuring Lloyd)	2010	—	93	—	—	—	—	—	—	—		Non-album single
"Sabotage" (Wale featuring Lloyd)	2012	—	16	16	—	—	—	—	—	—		Ambition
"Sucka" (August Alsina featuring Lloyd)	2012	—	—	—	—	—	—	—	—	—		The Product
"Feel It" (Jacquees featuring Rich Homie Quan and Lloyd)	2014	—	—	—	—	—	—	—	—	—	RIAA: Gold; RMNZ: Gold	19
"If You Only Knew" (Bizzy Crook featuring Lloyd)	2016	—	—	—	—	—	—	—	—	—		A Part of Everything
"I'm Down" (Malachiae Warren featuring Lloyd)	2017	—	—	—	—	—	—	—	—	—		Non-album single
"1999" (Big K.R.I.T. featuring Lloyd)	2017	—	—	—	—	—	—	—	—	—		4eva Is a Mighty Long Time
"Rock With You" (Mason & Julez featuring Lloyd)	2023	—	—	—	—	—	—	—	—	—		Non-album single
"—" denotes releases that did not chart, were not released in that country or did not receive a certification.

=== Promotional singles ===
List of promotional singles, with selected chart positions, showing year released and album name
Title	Year	Peak chart positions	Album
Title	Year	US R&B	Album
"Valentine"	2007	60	Street Love
"Set Me Free" (featuring Mystikal)	2010	87	Non-album singles
"Let's Get It In" (featuring 50 Cent)	2010	—	Non-album singles
"Be the One" (featuring Young Jeezy and Trey Songz)	2011	—	King of Hearts
"She's All I Want for Christmas"	2011	—	Non-album singles
"Do It Again"	2012	—	Non-album singles
"Heavenly Body" (featuring Rick Ross)	2017	—	Tru
"Excited"	2018	—	Tru
"Caramel"	2019	—	Tru

== Other charted songs ==
List of singles, with chart position, year released and album name
Title	Year	Peak chart position	Album
Title	Year	US R&B	Album
"Tear It Up" (Young Jeezy featuring Lloyd and Slick Pulla)	2005	77	Let's Get It: Thug Motivation 101

== Guest appearances ==
List of non-single guest appearances, with other performing artists, showing year released and album name
Title	Year	Other artist(s)	Album
"Where I'm From"	2004	Ja Rule	R.U.L.E.
"Get Paid"	2004	Ja Rule	none
"Take Me Tonight"	2004	Ashanti	Concrete Rose
"Street Life"	2005	Rick Ross	Port of Miami
"Tear It Up"	2005	Young Jeezy, Slick Pulla	Let's Get It: Thug Motivation 101
"Look at Her" (Remix)	2006	One Chance, Bobby Valentino, Trey Songz	none
"Cool Mint"	2006	Trillville	Trillville Reloaded
"Pussy Poppin'"	2006	Lil Scrappy	Bred 2 Die Born 2 Live
"Real Playa Like"	2007	Fabolous	From Nothin' to Somethin'
"Hit Me Up"	2007	The A'z	Drug Money Massacre
"Keep It on the Hush"	2007	Chamillionaire	Ultimate Victory
"Manager"	2007	Yung Berg	Look What You Made Me
"No More"	2007	DJ Drama, Willie the Kid, T.I.	Gangsta Grillz: The Album
"If We Fuck"	2007	Ali & Gipp, Jasper	Kinfolk
"Call Me"	2007	Gorilla Zoe	American Gangsta Part 2 (Hood Nigga Diaries)
"Hustle Fo"	2007	Rocko	Self Made
"Love You The Right Way"	2007	Big Kuntry King	My Turn to Eat
"Go Ahead"	2007	DJ Khaled, Fabolous, Flo Rida, Fat Joe, Rick Ross	We Global
"Call Me"	2009	Ace Hood	Gutta
"Let It Go"	2009	2 Pistols	Live From the Kitchen
"Party Girl"	2009	Tyga	Black Thoughts
"A Night Off"	2009	Drake	So Far Gone
"Wifey Material"	2009	Ace Hood	Ruthless
"Goner"	2010	Ghostface Killah	Ghostdini: Wizard of Poetry in Emerald City
"In Ya Life"	2010	Outlawz, EDIDON, Young Noble	The Lost Songs Vol. 2
"Everything Is Yours"	2010	Outlawz, Stormey Coleman, Young Noble, EDIDON	The Lost Songs Vol. 3
"Make a Movie"	2011	Chamillionaire, Twista	Venom
"In the Sheets"	2011	Terrace Martin	Terrace Martin & Devi Dev Present... The Sex EP
"Good for My Money"	2011	Baby Bash	Bashtown
"A Place"	2011	Dolla	Miseducation of Dolla
"Real Tonight"	2011	Tyga	Black Thoughts 2
"Bank"	2011	Travis Porter	Differenter 3
"I Am The Streets"	2011	Trae tha Truth, Rick Ross, Game	Street King
"Pushin On"	2011	Outlawz, Scarface	Perfect Timing
"Hello"	2011	Game	The R.E.D. Album
"Let's Chill"	2011	Wale	The Eleven One Eleven Theory
"She Likes Me"	2012	Jamie Drastik, Dayson	September
"Ask About Me"	2012	Jay Rock	From Hood Tales To The Cover Of XXL
"Zodiak Sign"	2012	Roscoe Dash	2.0
"My Way"	2012	DJ Drama, Common, Kendrick Lamar	Quality Street Music
"Happening"	2012	Medina	Forever 2.0
"Tomorrow"	Cyhi the Prynce	Ivy League Club	
"Purple Haze"	2013	Currensy, Trinidad James	New Jet City
"Fly Shit"	2013	Gucci Mane	Trap God 2
"ShiiKno"	2013	Rocko	Gift of Gab 2
"Worldwide" (OG Remix)	2013	EDIDON, Makaveli, 8Ball, Pimp C	O.G. Est. 1992
"My Baby"	2013	Ai	Moriagaro
"Beautiful Pain"	2013	2 Chainz, Mase	B.O.A.T.S. II: Me Time
"Cali for Life"	2013	Cali Swag District	none
"After Party"	2016	Jazz Lazer, Sean Kingston, Iamsu!	none
"How High"	2016	Currensy	Canal Street Confidential
"Closer"	2016	Guy Furious	none
"Touch"	2016	Cassius Jay	Trap Sinatra
"Hourglass"	2016	Jared Evan	The Blanket Truth
"5 On It"	2017	Yukmouth, Numskull	JJ Based On a Vill Story Two
"Thoughts"	2019	Tory Lanez, Lil Wayne	Chixtape 5
