= Tru =

Tru, or TRU, may refer to:

== Music ==
- TRU (band), an American rap group
- tru., a 2017 album by Cro
- Tru (Lloyd album), 2018
- Tru (Ovlov album), 2018
- "Tru" (song), a 2016 song by American singer Lloyd from the EP Tru

== Organizations ==
- Toys R Us, a toy retailer store

== Other uses ==
- Tru (mobile network)
- Tru (play), a 1989 play by Jay Presson Allen
- Tru (restaurant) (1999–2017), French restaurant located in Chicago, Illinois, U.S.
- Capitán FAP Carlos Martínez de Pinillos International Airport, in Trujillo, Peru
- Tactics and Rescue Unit of the Ontario Provincial Police
- Tasmanian Rugby Union
- Thompson Rivers University, in British Columbia, Canada
- Transpennine Route Upgrade, on the railway between Manchester and York
- Transuranic waste
- Tru by Hilton, a hotel brand from Hilton Worldwide
- Tru Collins, American actress and singer
- Tru Davies, the main character of the TV series Tru Calling
- Tru Edwards (born 2001), American football player
- Tru fm, a South African commercial radio station
- Tru Kids, an American retail and licensing company
- TRU Simulation + Training, an American flight simulators and training device manufacturer
- Truro railway station, in Cornwall, England
- truTV, an American multichannel television network
- Turoyo language

== See also ==
- True (disambiguation)
- Trus (disambiguation)
