= Truss (disambiguation) =

A truss is an architectural or engineering structure.

Truss or variant, may also refer to:

- Truss (surname), a list of people with the surname
  - Liz Truss, former prime minister of the United Kingdom
- Truss (botany), a terminal cluster of flowers or fruit arising from one stalk
- Truss (medicine), a type of surgical appliance
- Truss (unit), a bundle of hay or straw
- Trussing needle in cooking, used to tie poultry to hold its shape for roasting
- Truss rod, a guitar part used to adjust the profile of its neck or a component of railroad cars
- Timber roof truss, a common component of modern wood construction
- Truss head screw, a screw with a low and wide profile
- Truss's Island, River Thames, England, UK; a riverine island

== See also ==
- Truss bridge, a style of bridge architecture
- Trus (disambiguation)
