= Hey Young Girl =

Single by Lloyd

from the album Southside
- Released: August 14, 2004
- Recorded: 2004
- Genre: R&B
- Length: 3:57
- Label: The Inc., Sho'nuff, Def Jam
- Songwriter(s): Lloyd, Slick Rick, Carron Cole
- Producer(s): Cole

Lloyd singles chronology
"Southside" (2004)	"Hey Young Girl" (2004)	"You" (2006)

"Hey Young Girl" is the second single from Lloyd's first studio album Southside. The song is produced by Corron Cole. The song is inspired by Slick Rick's "Hey Young World", which the song is sampled from.

They made a music video for the single. Irv Gotti, Jermaine Dupri, Lil' Scrappy, Jazze Pha, Dallas Austin and Ciara made an appearance in the video.

Near the end of the video Lloyd sang the first verse of one of his other songs on Southside called "Take It Low". Ciara dances with Lloyd in that scene.

== Chart position ==
Chart (2004)	Peak position
U.S. Billboard Hot R&B/Hip-Hop Songs	61

== Release history ==
Region	Date	Format(s)	Label(s)	Ref.
United States	August 16, 2004	Contemporary hit · rhythmic contemporary radio	Murder Inc., Def Jam	
