= Cupid (Lloyd song) =

Single by Lloyd featuring Awesome Jones!!!!

from the album King of Hearts
- Released: March 22, 2011
- Recorded: 2010
- Genre: R&B
- Length: 4:07
- Label: Zone 4, Interscope Records
- Songwriter(s): Brandon Green; Jamal Jones; Jason Perry; Greg Curtis
- Producer(s): Polow da Don; Greg Curtis

Lloyd singles chronology
"Lay It Down" (2010)	"Cupid" (2011)	"Dedication to My Ex (Miss That)" (2011)

"Cupid" is a song American singer Lloyd, released by Zone 4 and Interscope Records on March 22, 2011 as the second single from his fourth studio album, King of Hearts (2011). It features guest vocals from Zone 4 label founder Polow da Don, who is credited as "Awesome Jones!!!!" and serves as the song's hype man. The latter acted as the song's producer alongside Greg Curtis, both of whom co-wrote it with Maejor and Jason Perry. The horns were played by Siraaj Amnesia James.

"Cupid" was only released in the United States, where it peaked at number two on the Bubbling Under Hot 100 chart.

== Music video ==
A music video to accompany the release of "Cupid" was first released onto YouTube on March 21, 2011, at a total length of four minutes and one seconds.

== Remix ==
The official remix was released on June 17, 2011, on Lloyd's YouTube page & posted the video on his blog, the remix features G-Unit rapper Lloyd Banks & Awesome Jones!!!!.

== Credits and personnel ==
- Lead vocals – Lloyd
- Producers – Polow da Don, Greg Curtis
- Lyrics – Bei Maejor, Polow A. Jones, Jason Perry, Greg Curtis
- Horns - Siraaj Amnesia James
- Label: Zone 4, Interscope Records

== Charts ==
=== Weekly charts ===
Chart (2011)	Peak position
US Bubbling Under Hot 100 (Billboard)	2
US Hot R&B/Hip-Hop Songs (Billboard)	11
US Rhythmic (Billboard)	33

=== Year-end charts ===
Chart (2011)	Position
US Hot R&B/Hip-Hop Songs (Billboard)	66
