= Valentine (Lloyd song) =

Promotional single by Lloyd

from the album Street Love
- Released: February 2007 (U.S.)
- Recorded: 2006
- Genre: R&B
- Length: 4:26
- Label: The Inc., Sho'nuff, Universal, Young Goldie Music
- Songwriter: Lloyd Polite
- Producers: Wirlie Morris, Lloyd Polite, J. Irby, T.W. Hale

"Valentine" is a song from Lloyd's second studio album, Street Love, peaked at number #60 on the Billboard Hot R&B/Hip-Hop Songs chart. The track was produced by Wally Morris, Lloyd Polite, J.Irby, and T.W. Hale. The track was written by Lloyd Polite. All vocals are by Lloyd Polite. It was only released on radio as a promotion single.

== Remix ==
There's a remix featuring Slim Thug and Bun B, which is now called "Travel".

== Charts ==
Chart (2007)	Peak position
U.S. Billboard Hot R&B/Hip-Hop Songs	60
