= Girls Around the World =

2008 single by Lloyd

Single by Lloyd featuring Lil Wayne

from the album Lessons in Love
- Released: May 12, 2008
- Recorded: 2007
- Genre: R&B; hip hop
- Length: 3:31
- Label: Young Goldie Music; The Inc., Universal
- Songwriters: Lloyd Polite, Dwayne Carter, Lloyd Pinchback, Eric Barrier, William Griffin
- Producers: Big Reese, Jasper Cameron

Lloyd singles chronology
"How We Do It (Around My Way)" (2008)	"Girls Around the World" (2008)	"Turn Heads" (2008)

Lil Wayne singles chronology
"Love in This Club Part II" (2008)	"Girls Around the World" (2008)	"I Run This" (2008)

Music video
- "Girls Around the World" on YouTube

"Girls Around the World" is a song by American recording artist Lloyd. The song features rapper Lil Wayne and was written by Lloyd and Lil Wayne, along with Eric Barrier and William Griffin. The song was produced by his production team, Big Reese and Jasper Cameron, who also produced his breakthrough hit, "You", which also featured Lil Wayne. The song served as the lead single for Lloyd's third studio album Lessons in Love. "Girls Around the World" received positive to mixed reviews from critics, some of whom noted it as generic, and others named it as a top track from the album. It reached No. 64 on the Billboard Hot 100 and No. 13 on the Hot R&B/Hip-Hop Songs chart. The song samples the drum break from "Ashley's Roachclip" by the Soul Searchers, as well as interpolating Rakim's verse in "Paid in Full" by hip hop duo Eric B. & Rakim.

== Background ==
The song first leaked on Lil Wayne's Da Drought is Over Pt. 5 mixtape on March 30, 2008. During an interview with British magazine Blues & Soul, Lloyd revealed that Girls Around the World would be the second single from the album. It was sent to U.S. radio stations on May 12, 2008.

== Remixes and freestyles ==
The official remix, "Girls Around the World (We The Best Remix)", features DJ Khaled, The Game, T.I., Yung Joc, Rick Ross, Ace Hood, Young Dro, Pitbull and Busta Rhymes. There is also a radio edit version that features DJ Khaled, The Game, T.I., Yung Joc and Busta Rhymes. The remix also samples from "Paid in Full" by Eric B. & Rakim. There are no verses by Lloyd; he only sings the chorus. Another remix features a verse from R&B singer Trey Songz. Chamillionaire released a freestyle of this song for his Mixtape Messiah 4 called "All Around the World". In the song, he sings an entire verse, along with rapping.

== Music video ==
The music video of the song was shot in Miami, Florida, and directed by Hype Williams. The video premiered on June 4, 2008 on BET's 106 & Park. It was also made available on Yahoo! Music on June 9, 2008. Its outer space theme was thought to be influenced by Janet Jackson's "Feedback."

== Charts ==
=== Weekly charts ===
Chart (2008)	Peak position
US Billboard Hot 100	64
US Hot R&B/Hip-Hop Songs (Billboard)	13
US Rhythmic Airplay (Billboard)	19

=== Year-end charts ===
Chart (2008)	Position
US Hot R&B/Hip-Hop Songs (Billboard)	64
