= Street Love =

Studio album by Lloyd
- Released: March 13, 2007
- Genre: R&B
- Length: 60:43
- Label: Young Goldie; The Inc.; Universal Motown
- Producer: Henry "Noonie" Lee (also exec.); Irv Gotti (also exec.); Joyce "Fenderella" Irby (also exec.); Lloyd Polite (also exec.); 7 Aurelius; Big Reese; Jasper Cameron; Bryan Michael Cox; Don Vito; Flash Technology; Eric Hudson; James "J. Lack" Lackey; Wirlie "Wyl-E" Morris; Matty P; Jazze Pha

Lloyd chronology
Southside (2004)	Street Love (2007)	Lessons in Love (2008)

Singles from Street Love
- 1. "You" Released: October 23, 2006; 2. "Get It Shawty" Released: March 13, 2007; 3. "Player's Prayer" Released: July 17, 2007

Street Love is the second studio album by singer Lloyd. It was released on March 13, 2007, through Young Goldie Music, The Inc. Records, and Universal Motown. The singer worked with a variety of new collaborators on the project, including The Inc. in-house producer 7 Aurelius as well as Big Reese, Jasper Cameron, Bryan Michael Cox, Don Vito, Eric Hudson, Jazze Pha, among others. Lil Wayne, André 3000 and Nas appear as guest vocalists on the album.

The album received a positive reception from critics who considered it an improvement over his debut album Southside (2004). Street Love debuted at number two on the US Billboard 200, selling 144,672 copies sold in its first week. The album was certified Gold by the Recording Industry Association of America (RIAA) and reached Platinum status in 2024. "You" featuring Lil Wayne was released as the album's lead single, while "Get It Shawty" and its remix featuring Yung Joc served as the album's second single.

== Promotion ==
"You," the album's lead single was released on October 23, 2006. It became Lloyd's highest-charting single yet, peaking at number nine of the US Billboard Hot 100 and number one on the Hot R&B/Hip-Hop Songs chart. The song was eventually certified 4× Platinum by the Recording Industry Association of America (RIAA) and also reached Gold status in the United Kingdom. "Get It Shawty" was issued as the album's second single on March 13, 2007. It became at top 20 hit on the Billboard Hot 100 and peaked at number four one on the Hot R&B/Hip-Hop Songs chart, reaching 2× Platinum status in the United States. "Player's Prayer" was released as the album's third and final single on July 17, 2007, but was significantly less successful, reaching number 74 on the Hot R&B/Hip-Hop Songs chart.

== Critical reception ==
Professional ratings
Review scores
Source	Rating
About.com	3/5 stars
AllMusic	3.5/5 stars
Entertainment Weekly	B−
Okayplayer	3.5/5 stars
PopMatters	4/10 stars
USA Today	2.5/4 stars

Street Love garnered a generally positive reception from music critics who found it an improvement over Southside (2004). AllMusic's David Jeffries praised the album for shedding Lloyd's thug image and replacing it with slow jams that come across as more convincing and sexy, saying that "Lloyd is more comfortable, committed, and believable on Street Love, and if taken in small doses, you can add satisfying to the list." Mark Edward Nero of About.com also complimented the album for providing songs that will catch the public's attention but also said that its lacking in artistic quality, substance and vocal delivery, concluding with "That said, the album isn't bad. Lloyd plays his role well and manages to come across as sensitive yet strong, and not as a sappy sucker." New York Times critic Jon Caramanica called the album "a small triumph of contemporary R&B."

Steve Jones of USA Today gave Street Love a two-and-a-half-star rating, praising the singer's "airy but sensual vocals" and smooth R&B grooves while noting that, despite some weaker tracks, the album contained enough highlights to appeal to urban audiences. Adam Pearthree of Okayplayer said that despite faltering towards the end he praised the track variety throughout the record for having formulaic but attention-grabbing lyrical work, concluding that "Those looking for the next great step forward in R&B will be sorely disappointed, but if you need to fill the gap in your life while waiting for a new Usher album, Street Love will not let you down." Andy Greenwald of Entertainment Weekly said that the album had potential but concluded with, "Unfortunately, in between, Lloyd's talents are adrift on an ocean of samey slow jams." Gentry Boeckel of PopMatters criticized the record for having an overabundance of slow-paced ballads, saying that "Lloyd seems more interested in making staid, tried-and-true, music-that-will-get-me-laid music, rather than taking the style to new enclaves."

== Commercial performance ==
Street Love debuted and peaked at number two on both the US Billboard 200 and the Top R&B/Hip-Hop Albums chart, selling 144,672 copies sold in its first week. It marked hist first top ten entry on the former chart as well as Llody's best sales week by then. By December 2007, Street Love had sold 523,000 copies domestically, according to Nielsen SoundScan. The album was certified Gold by the Recording Industry Association of America (RIAA) on April 18, 2007, and reached Platinum status on October 16, 2024, based on sales and streaming figures in the United States.

== Track listing ==
Street Love track listing
No.	Title	Writer(s)	Producer(s)	Length
1.	"Lloyd (Intro)"	Bryan-Michael Cox; Adonis Shropshire; James Brown; Charles Bobbit; William Stallings	Bryan-Michael Cox; Adonis Shropshire^{[a]}	1:32
2.	"You" (featuring Lil Wayne)	Maurice Sinclair; Jasper Cameron; Dwayne Carter; Gary Kemp	Big Reese; Jasper	4:33
3.	"Certified"	Phalon Alexander; Johntá Austin; Zak Wallace	Jazze Pha	4:32
4.	"I Don't Mind"	Herman Lang, Jr.; Austin	Flash Technology; Johntá Austin^{[a]}	3:55
5.	"Get It Shawty"	James Lackey; Ryon Lovett; Wallace; Lloyd Polite	James "J Lack" Lackey	3:29
6.	"Incredible"	Alexander; Polite; Lovett; Cedric Williams	Jazze Pha; Ced Keyz^{[b]}	4:12
7.	"Valentine"	Wirlie Morris; Polite; Joyce Irby; Traci Hale	Wirlie "Wyl-E" Morris	4:26
8.	"Hazel"	Lackey; Lovett	James "J Lack" Lackey	3:51
9.	"Player's Prayer"	Cameron	Jasper	4:11
10.	"Killing Me"	Sinclair; Cameron; Polite; James Devon Brabham; Veronika Bozeman	Big Reese	4:37
11.	"Take You Home"	Eric Hudson; Polite; Cameron	Eric Hudson; Jasper^{[a]}	3:47
12.	"What You Wanna Do"	Sinclair; Cameron; Polite; Alexander	Big Reese; Jasper	3:44
13.	"Streetlove"	Sinclair; Cameron; Polie	Big Reese; Jasper	4:55
14.	"One for Me"	Irving Lorenzo; Seven Aurelius; Polite; Kelley Parham; Matthew Pearson; Anne Dudley; Trevor Horn; Gary Langan; Jonathan Jeczalik; Paul Morley	7 Aurelius	4:12
15.	"I Want You (Remix)" (featuring André 3000 and Nas)	Sinclair; Cameron; André Benjamin; Nasir Jones; Kemp	Big Reese; Jasper; Irv Gotti^{[b]}	4:27
Total length:				60:43

Best Buy bonus track
No.	Title	Writer(s)	Producer(s)	Length
16.	"Drop It on the One"	Polite; Jagged Edge; Brian Casey; Rodney Richards; J. Williams	Don Vito	2:44

UK / Best Buy bonus track
No.	Title	Writer(s)	Producer(s)	Length
17.	"Hit the Floor"	Polite; Matthew Kent Pearson	Matty P	4:22

Notes

- ^{^[a]} signifies a vocal producer
- ^{^[b]} signifies a co-producer

Sample credits

- "Lloyd (Intro)" contains a sample of "Public Enemy #1 Part 1", written by James Brown, Charles Bobbit, and William Stallings; and performed by James Brown.
- "You" contains elements of "True (Spandau Ballet song)", written by Gary Kemp.
- "One for Me" contains a sample of "Moments in Love", written by Anne Dudley, Trevor Horn, Gary Langan, Jonathan Jeczalik, and Paul Morley; and performed by Art of Noise.
- "I Want You Remix" contains a sample from "True", written by Gary Kemp, and performed by Spandau Ballet.

== Personnel ==
- A&R – Jasper Cameron, Kelley Parham, Maurice Sinclair
- A&R [A&R For The Inc.] – Erroll "BeEzie" Vaughn
- Administrator [A&R Administration For The Inc.] – Darcell Lawrence
- Administrator [A&R Administration For Universal Motown] – Eloise Bryan, Meredeth Oliver
- Administrator [A&R Administration] – Kelley Parham
- Arranged By [Vocals] – Jasper Cameron (tracks: 9, 11), Johnta' Austin (tracks: 4), Lloyd Polite (tracks: 9)
- Art Direction – Lorna Leighton
- Backing Vocals – Adonis (tracks: 1), Cavi (4) (tracks: 13), Lloyd (tracks: 1, 13)
- Coordinator [A&R Coordination For Universal Motown] – Traci Talmaire
- Coordinator [A&R Coordination] – Laura Giles
- Coordinator [Production Coordinator] – Candice Childress (tracks: 1)
- Creative Director – Sandra Brummels
- Edited By [Additional Editing] – Lunna Man (tracks: 15)
- Executive-Producer – Henry "Noonie" Lee, Irv Gotti, Joyce "Fenderella" Irby, Lloyd Polite
- Guitar – Carroll "Palmo" Paryo (tracks: 7), Dwayne Cotts (tracks: 9, 10)
- Keyboards – Ced Keys (tracks: 3, 6), Eric Hudson (tracks: 11), James Devon Brabham (tracks: 10)
- Keyboards [Additional], Talkbox – Elvis "Cookie Monster" Williams (tracks: 13)
- Keyboards, Drums, Bass – Bryan-Michael Cox (tracks: 1)
- Keyboards, Programmed By – Jasper (tracks: 9)
- Legal – Jerry Juste, Vernon Slaughter
- Legal [For Universal Motown] – Angela Auld
- Management [For Sho'Nuff / Blueprint, Inc.] – Henry "Noonie" Lee*
- Marketing – Donald "D-Day" Albright
- Marketing [Marketing For The Inc.] – Dan "DanTan" Cooper*
- Marketing [Marketing For Universal Motown] – Tatia Fox
- Mastered By – Glenn Schick (tracks: 2, 5), Tom Coyne (tracks: 1, 3, 4, 6 to 15)
- Mixed By – Carlton Lynn (tracks: 4, 9, 10, 12, 13), John Frye (tracks: 1, 5, 8, 11), Leslie Brathwaite (tracks: 3, 6), Manny Marroquin (tracks: 2), Milwaukee Buck (tracks: 14), Sam Thomas (2) (tracks: 7)
- Mixed By [Assistant] – Gary Fly (tracks: 11), Jared Robbins (tracks: 2), Kori Anders (tracks: 3, 6), Mac (39) (tracks: 12, 13)
- Photography By – Christian Lantry
- Recorded By – Big Reese (tracks: 2), Carlton Lynn (tracks: 2, 9, 12, 15), Howard White (tracks: 3, 10, 12), Mike Mora (tracks: 15), Miles Walker (tracks: 5, 8), Nico Solis (tracks: 4, 6, 13, 14), Sam "Goody" Thomas (tracks: 1), Steve Fisher (tracks: 11)
- Recorded By [Assistant] – Adrienne Dickey (tracks: 6), Alan Mason (tracks: 1), Denny Ogle* (tracks: 3, 6, 10, 13), Justin Trawick (tracks: 11), Mike Miller (9) (tracks: 14), Muzzy Solis (tracks: 12), Vincent Alexander (tracks: 4)
- Recorded By, Keyboards, Synthesizer, Drum Programming – Wirlie "Wyl-E" Morris (tracks: 7)
- Scratches – Greg "Ruckus" Andrews (tracks: 10)
- Vocals [All Vocals] – Lloyd (tracks: 7)

== Charts ==
=== Weekly charts ===
Weekly chart performance for Street Love
Chart (2007)	Peak position
US Billboard 200	2
US Top R&B/Hip-Hop Albums (Billboard)	2

=== Year-end charts ===
Year-end chart performance for Lessons in Love
Class (2007)	Position
US Billboard 200	103
US Top R&B/Hip-Hop Albums (Billboard)	25

== Certifications ==
Certifications for Street Love
Region	Certification	Certified units/sales
United States (RIAA)	Platinum	1,000,000^{‡}
^{‡} Sales+streaming figures based on certification alone.
