= Trus =

Trus or variation, may refer to:

- Transrectal ultrasonography (TRUS)
- Vitali Trus (born 1988), Belarusian ice hockey player
- Viktar Trus, a Belarusian discus thrower at the 2019 Summer Universiade and 2017 European Athletics U23 Championships

== See also ==
- Truss (disambiguation)
- Tru (disambiguation)
