= Dedication to My Ex (Miss That) =

2011 single by Lloyd

Single by Lloyd featuring André 3000 and Lil Wayne

from the album King of Hearts
- Released: August 9, 2011
- Recorded: 2010
- Genre: Retro-soul
- Length: 3:56
- Label: Young Goldie Music; Interscope; Zone 4
- Songwriters: Dreshan Smith; Jamal F. Jones; Dwayne Carter Jr.; André Benjamin
- Producers: D. Smith; Polow da Don (co.)

Lloyd singles chronology
"Cupid" (2011)	"Dedication to My Ex (Miss That)" (2011)	"Tru" (2016)

André 3000 singles chronology
"Green Light" (2008)	"Dedication to My Ex (Miss That)" (2011)	"Party" (2011)

Music video
- "Dedication to My Ex (Miss That)" on YouTube

"Dedication to My Ex (Miss That)" is a song by R&B recording artist Lloyd, released on August 9, 2011 as the third single from his fourth studio album, King of Hearts (2011). The song, produced by Polow da Don and D. Smith from Zone 4 productions, features a verse from André 3000 of Outkast, and is "narrated" by Lloyd's frequent collaborator and fellow Louisiana native Lil Wayne. The brass instrumentation was performed by Siraaj Amnesia James. The song was edited for radio in the United Kingdom (among other places), replacing the word "pussy" with "lovin'". The single performed average domestically, but reached the top 5 in the UK, Australia, and Ireland, also reaching the top 10 in Denmark, Netherlands and Austria. The song remains Lloyd's biggest hit song internationally.

== Music video ==
The song's music video, directed by Bryan Barber, premiered on 106 & Park on September 13, 2011. André 3000 and Lil Wayne do not appear in the video; instead Wayne Brady and a cat lip-sync Wayne and Andre 3000's lyrics, respectively. The video featured Natalie La Rose as the leading female character.

== Track listing ==
Digital download
No.	Title	Length
1.	"Dedication to My Ex (Miss That)" (Clean version)	3:56
2.	"Dedication to My Ex (Miss That)" (Album version)	3:56
3.	"Lay It Down"	4:01

== Charts and certifications ==
=== Weekly charts ===
Chart (2011–12)	Peak position
Australia (ARIA)	3
Austria (Ö3 Austria Top 40)	6
Belgium (Ultratip Bubbling Under Flanders)	87
Canada (Canadian Hot 100)	33
Denmark (Tracklisten)	7
Euro Digital Song Sales (Billboard)	10
Germany (GfK)	52
Hungary (Rádiós Top 40)	21
Ireland (IRMA)	5
Latvia (European Hit Radio)	20
Netherlands (Dutch Top 40)	6
Netherlands (Single Top 100)	13
New Zealand (Recorded Music NZ)	14
Scottish Singles Sales (Official Charts)	5
Slovakia Airplay (ČNS IFPI)	34
UK Singles (Official Charts)	3
UK Hip Hop/R&B (Official Charts)	1
US Billboard Hot 100	79
US Hot R&B/Hip-Hop Songs (Billboard)	43
US Pop Songs (Billboard)	30

=== Year-end charts ===
Chart (2011)	Position
Australia (ARIA)	59
UK Singles (Official Charts Company)	137
Chart (2012)	Position
Australia (ARIA)	98
Austria (Ö3 Austria Top 40)	59
Netherlands (Dutch Top 40)	42
Netherlands (Single Top 100)	63
UK Singles (Official Charts Company)	81

=== Certifications ===
Region	Certification	Certified units/sales
Australia (ARIA)	3× Platinum	210,000^{^}
Denmark (IFPI Danmark)	Gold	15,000^{^}
New Zealand (RMNZ)	Gold	7,500^{*}
United Kingdom (BPI)	Gold	400,000^{^}
^{*} Sales figures based on certification alone.^{^} Shipments figures based on certification alone.

== Radio dates and release history ==
List of radio and release dates with formats and record labels
Country	Date	Format	Label
United States	August 9, 2011	Rhythmic airplay	Interscope Records
United States	August 30, 2011	Mainstream airplay	Interscope Records
United Kingdom	December 4, 2011	Digital download	Interscope Records

== See also ==
- List of UK R&B Singles Chart number ones of 2011
- List of UK top-ten singles in 2011
- List of UK top-ten singles in 2012
