= Year of the Lover =

Single by Lloyd featuring Plies

from the album Lessons in Love
- Released: September 2, 2008
- Recorded: 2008
- Genre: R&B
- Length: 4:07
- Label: Young Goldie Music; The Inc., Universal
- Songwriters: Rico Love, Eric Hudson
- Producer: Eric Hudson

Lloyd singles chronology
"Turn Heads" (2008)	"Year of the Lover" (2008)	"BedRock" (2009)

Plies singles chronology
"Please Excuse My Hands" (2008)	"Year of the Lover" (2008)	"Hi Hater (Remix)" (2008)

"Year of the Lover" is a song by American R&B recording artist Lloyd, released as the third and final single from his third studio album Lessons in Love (2008). The song was produced by Eric Hudson and written by Rico Love. It was sent to U.S. radio stations on July 10, 2009. The single was only released in the United States, where it only reached #101 on Billboard Hot R&B/Hip-Hop Songs chart. Although the song was a favorite among many, the single lacked promotion and didn't receive a music video. The single version features rapper Plies. Both Plies and Fabolous was featured on the song in Lessons in Love 2.0. Other remixes come from Rock City.

== Chart position ==
Chart (2008)	Peak position
U.S. Billboard Bubbling Under R&B/Hip-Hop Singles	1
