= Lessons in Love (album) =

Studio album by Lloyd
- Released: August 4, 2008
- Length: 45:53
- Labels: Young Goldie; The Inc.; Universal Motown
- Producers: Henry "Noonie" Lee (also exec.); Irv Gotti (also exec.); Lloyd Polite Jr. (also exec.); Adonis; Big Reese; Jasper Cameron; Oak Felder; Eric Hudson; James "JLack" Lackey; Polow da Don

Lloyd chronology
Street Love (2007)	Lessons in Love (2008)	King of Hearts (2011)

Singles from Lessons in Love
- 1. "How We Do It (Around My Way)" Released: March 4, 2008; 2. "Girls Around the World" Released: May 12, 2008; 3. "Year of the Lover" Released: September 2, 2008

Lessons in Love is the third studio album by American singer Lloyd. It was released by Young Goldie Music, The Inc. Records, and Universal Motown on August 4, 2008, in the United States. The singer reteamed with Big Reese and Jasper Cameron to work on the majority of the album. Additional collaborators included Adonis, Oak Felder, Eric Hudson, James "JLack" Lackey, and Polow da Don.

The album earned largely mixed reviews from music critics, some of whom felt that it was inferior to his previous work. It debuted at number seven on the US Billboard 200 and number one on the Top R&B/Hip-Hop Albums charts, with first week sales of 51,000 units. Lessons in Love spawned several singles, including "Girls Around the World" which peaked at number 13 on the US Hot R&B/Hip-Hop Songs. It was Lloyd's final project to be released on The Inc. Records.

== Production ==
The album was originally to be titled Sexual Education but was later changed to Lessons in Love for a more suitable title. Lloyd commented on the title in an interview with Blues & Soul: "The title concept derives from a schoolboy fantasy of mine, where I become a professor of a classroom full of gorgeous girls, and I feel the best thing I can give them that's really worth having is lessons in love!" he said about the issues worked into the tracks. Following their participation on previous album Street Love (2007), the singer re-teamed with producers Big Reese and Jasper Cameron to work on the majority of the album, with additional production resulting from collaborations with Polow Da Don, Adonis Shropshire, James "JLack" Lackey, Oak Felder, and others.

== Promotion ==
The first single, "How We Do It (Around My Way)" features rapper Ludacris, peaked at number seventy-seven on Billboard's US Hot R&B/Hip-Hop Songs chart. It also peaked at number seventy-five on the UK Singles Chart. "Girls Around the World" was the album's second single. It features the rapper Lil Wayne. The single was sent to US radio stations for airplay consideration on May 12, 2008. It peaked at sixty-four on Billboard's Hot 100 and thirteen on the Hot R&B/Hip-Hop Songs chart. The third and final single was "Year of the Lover". The single version featured rapper Plies. It only peaked at number one on the Billboard Bubbling Under R&B/Hip-Hop Singles. "I Can Change Your Life" was supposed to be the fourth single from the album, but was cancelled due to the lackluster chart performance of "Year of the Lover".

== Critical reception ==
Professional ratings
Aggregate scores
Source	Rating
Metacritic	60/100
Review scores
Source	Rating
About.com	2.5/5 stars
AllMusic	3/5 stars
Entertainment Weekly	C+
The Guardian	4/5 stars
New York Daily News	4/5 stars
PopMatters	5/10
Rolling Stone	3/5 stars
Slant Magazine	2.5/5 stars
UGO Networks	C+
USA Today	2.5/4 stars

Lessons in Love received mixed or average reviews from critics. It holds a 60 out of 100 from Metacritic. In his review for New York Daily News, Jim Farber wrote: "Lloyd comes off as randy, rather than skeevy, in part because his music avoids the low-down grind. By current R&B;'s slovenly standards, this is brisk stuff. But the crowning element remains Lloyd's light voice. His flutter offers just the right stroke." HipHopDX critic Crystal Craboy felt that "even though his short but sweet LP borders on being too sexy for his young fan base, there is a saving grace that lies within. Lloyd sings of sexuality within the confines of true love, a concept his counterparts have all but forgotten. And that within itself, takes Lessons in Love to the top of its class." Alex Macpherson from The Guardian felt that Lloyd "rarely strays far from a seducer's template, but the way in which he sells the cliche is compelling."

Rolling Stone's Christian Hoard gave the album three out of five stars, saying, "Throughout Lessons in Love, Lloyd sounds like he's actually having fun dishing out come-ons, adding an emphatic exuberance to each one." AllMusic editor Andy Kellman wrote that Lessons in Love "cannot be dismissed, but Lloyd will have to really change it up with his fourth album to evade a real holding pattern." Sal Cinquemani, writing for Slant Magazine, remarked that Lessons in Love was "largely comprised of heavy-beated, midtempo ballads—a trend that is, admittedly, preferable to the schmaltzy AC ballads of the '90s and the drippy baby-makin’ jams of the recent past." PopMatters noted hat "the greatest tragedy behind Lessons in Love is that the album’s sporadic moments of charm and promise make it incredibly tricky to dismiss Lloyd’s efforts altogether."

Mark Edward Nero from About.com found that Lessons in Love was "not a complete waste of time, but unless you're a lovesick teenage girl, there aren't many songs that merit repeat listening. After breaking through with a very entertaining album last year, Lloyd has unfortunately taken a half-step back this time out." Entertainment Weekly's Simon Vozick-Levinson noted that Lloyd "is blessed with a bright, soulful falsetto — the kind of voice that can elevate even mediocre material. Unfortunately, he’s forced to demonstrate that talent all too often on his third LP Lessons in Love. For the most part, this is a bland blur of midtempo grooves and sub-R. Kelly metaphors." New York Times critic Jon Caramanica called the album "disappointing." He found that "unlike its predecessor, which gave Lloyd's tender alto room to breathe, much of the production here is gooey and distracting, too dense for Lloyd to make a dent in." Marguerite French of UGO Networks Lloyd's newest album has all of the fun and freaky elements of R&B [...] Still, the lyrics and concepts are often laughable [...] "Have My Baby" and "Love Making 101" are some bright points, but more often than not the album tips the balance away from poetic seduction and into an embarrassingly bare description of some very private things."

== Commercial performance ==
Lessons in Love debuted at number seven on the US Billboard 200 and number one on the Top R&B/Hip-Hop Albums charts, with first week sales of 51,000 units. It was Lloyd's second top ten album on the US Billboard 200 and his first to top the Top R&B/Hip-Hop Albums chart.

== Track listing ==
Lessons in Love track listing
No.	Title	Writer(s)	Producer(s)	Length
1.	"Sex Education"	Jasper Cameron; Lloyd Polite; Maurice Sinclair	Big Reese; Cameron	3:36
2.	"Girls Around the World" (featuring Lil Wayne)	Cameron; Dwayne Carter, Jr.; L. Pinchback; Polite; Sinclair	Big Reese; Cameron	3:49
3.	"Treat U Good"	Johntá Austin; Eric Hudson	Hudson	4:08
4.	"Year of the Lover"	Hudson; Richard Butler, Jr.	Hudson	4:06
5.	"I Can Change Your Life"	Warren Felder; Robert Huggar; Polite	Oak	3:28
6.	"Lose Your Love"	Cameron; Polite; Sinclair; J. Spinks	Big Reese; Cameron	4:04
7.	"Have My Baby"	Cameron; Polite	Big Reese; Cameron	4:15
8.	"Love Making 101"	Hudson; Polite; Adonis Shropshire	Hudson	4:04
9.	"Party All Over Your Body"	Cameron; Jamal Jones; Polite	Polow da Don	3:46
10.	"Touched By An Angel"	Cameron; Polite; Sinclair	Big Reese; Cameron	4:09
11.	"I'm Wit It"	James Lackey; Keri Hilson; Ryon Lovette	James "JLack" Lackey	3:05
12.	"Heart Attack"	Polite; Shropshire; J. White	Shropshire	3:23
Total length:				45:53

International bonus tracks
No.	Title	Writer(s)	Producer(s)	Length
13.	"How We Do It (Around My Way)" (featuring Ludacris)	Christopher Bridges; Polite; Davion Farris; Tiffany Gouche; Michael Henry; Jason Henry; Emmanuell Chisolm	Baby Boy; Superkidd	3:36
14.	"How We Do It (In the UK)" (Sway Remix featuring Sway)	Derek Safo; Polite; Farris; Gouche; M. Henry; J. Henry; Chisolm	Baby Boy; Superkidd	3:38
Total length:				53:11

Circuit City exclusive bonus track
No.	Title	Writer(s)	Producer(s)	Length
13.	"If He Knew"	Cameron; Polite; Sinclair; Zachary Wallace	Big Reese; Cameron	3:22
Total length:				49:15

Lessons in Love 2.0
No.	Title	Length
1.	"Lessons in Love"	2:40
2.	"Lights, Camera, Action"	3:06
3.	"I Need Love" (featuring The-Dream)	3:42
4.	"Can't Get Over"	3:04
5.	"I'm Wit It" (featuring Yung Joc)	3:39
6.	"Year of the Lover" (featuring Fabolous & Plies)	5:07
7.	"Do The Damn Thang"	3:35
8.	"Day in the Life"	4:21
9.	"Lose Control" (featuring Nelly)	4:19
10.	"Love Spaceship" (featuring Danah Lewis)	4:15
11.	"If He Knew"	3:27
12.	"Nobody But Me"	3:08
13.	"I Don't Wanna Be"	4:13

== Personnel ==
- A&R – Henry "Noonie" Lee, Matty P
- Administrator [A&R Admin] – Darcell Lawrence, Meredeth Oliver
- Art Direction – Sandy Brummels
- Coordinator [A&R Coordinator] – Darcell Lawrence, Edward Richardson, Laura Giles
- Design – Lorna Leighton
- Executive-Producer – Henry "Noonie" Lee, Irv Gotti, Lloyd Polite Jr.
- Legal – Vernon Slaughter
- Management – Henry "Noonie" Lee, Ryan Lewis
- Marketing – Amber Noble, Dan "Dan Tan" Cooper, Donald "D-Day" Albright, Tatia Fox
- Mastered By – Seth Foster
- Photography By – Christian Lantry

== Charts ==
=== Weekly charts ===
Weekly chart performance for Lessons in Love
Chart (2008)	Peak position
UK Albums (Official Charts)	81
UK R&B Albums (Official Charts)	8
US Billboard 200	7
US Top R&B/Hip-Hop Albums (Billboard)	1

=== Year-end charts ===
Year-end chart performance for Lessons in Love
Chart (2008)	Position
US Top R&B/Hip-Hop Albums (Billboard)	66

== Release history ==
List of releases of Lessons in Love
Region	Date	Format	Label
United Kingdom	August 4, 2008	Standard	Young Goldie Music; Sho'Nuff; The Inc.; Universal Motown
United States	August 5, 2008	Standard	Young Goldie Music; Sho'Nuff; The Inc.; Universal Motown
Canada	September 30, 2008	Standard	Young Goldie Music; Sho'Nuff; The Inc.; Universal Motown

== See also ==
- List of Billboard number-one R&B albums of 2008
