= How We Do It (Around My Way) =

Single by Lloyd featuring Ludacris

from the album Lessons in Love
- Released: March 4, 2008
- Recorded: 2007
- Genre: R&B
- Length: 3:42
- Songwriters: Christopher Bridges; Lloyd Polite; M. Henry; J. Henry; E. Chisolm; D. Farris; T. Gouche
- Producers: J. "Babyboy" Henry Boy; J. "Superkidd" Henry

Lloyd singles chronology
"Secret Admirer" (2007)	"How We Do It (Around My Way)" (2008)	"Girls Around the World" (2008)

Ludacris singles chronology
"Grippin'" (2008)	"How We Do It (Around My Way)" (2008)	"Pretty Girl" (2008)

Alternative cover
- SpiralFrog single cover

"How We Do It (Around My Way)" is the first single from R&B singer Lloyd's third studio album Lessons in Love, and features rapper Ludacris. It was sent to US radio stations on March 4, 2008.

The demo version of the track, titled "How We Do It (In the A)", was leaked to the Internet in February 2008. The video was shot on April 12, 2008 and video debuted on Yahoo! Music on April 28.

== Formats and track listings ==
UK CD single

1. "How We Do It (Around My Way)" (Original)
2. "How We Do It (Around My Way)" (Wideboys Mix)
3. "How We Do It (Around My Way)" (Rekless Mix)

== Remix ==
There is also an official remix of the song called "How We Do (In the UK)" and features UK hip-hop artist Sway DaSafo. It was premiered on 1xtra by Ronnie Herel on 16 June 2008. Lloyd's verses in the song are exactly the same except he sings "How we do in the UK" during the chorus rather than "How we do around my way".

"How We Do It (In the UK)" is featured as a bonus track on the UK edition of Lessons in Love.

== Other versions ==
- "How We Do It (In the A)"
- "How We Do It (In the UK)"

== Chart position ==
Chart (2008)	Peak position
U.S. Billboard Hot R&B/Hip-Hop Songs	77
UK Singles Chart	75
