= Get It Shawty =

Single by Lloyd

from the album Street Love
- Released: March 13, 2007
- Recorded: 2006
- Genre: R&B; dance-pop
- Length: 3:29
- Label: Young Goldie Music, The Inc., Sho'nuff, Universal
- Songwriters: J. Lackey, R. Lovett, Z. Wallace M. Logan
- Producer: James "J. Lack" Lackey

Lloyd singles chronology
"You" (2006)	"Get It Shawty" (2007)	"Player's Prayer" (2007)

"Get It Shawty" is a song by American R&B singer Lloyd. It was released in March 2007 as the second single from his second album, Street Love (2007). Lloyd stated that he wanted to try something different with the track, and be able to have fun and show off some of his hip hop and dance moves. The song was produced by American record producer James "J. Lack" Lackey, the half-brother of fellow R&B artist Usher; Lloyd was at the offices of Usher's management when he overheard the beat for "Get It Shawty", which he apparently liked so much that he "begged" Usher to let him have it for himself. The song interpolates "Pump Up the Jam" by Technotronic throughout its chorus.

"Get It Shawty" entered Billboard magazine's Hot R&B/Hip-Hop Songs chart at number 57 (on the chart issue dated March 24, 2007), eventually peaking at number 4; the following week, the single debuted on the Billboard Hot 100 at number 76, eventually peaking at number 16. The song was featured in the in-game radio station The Vibe 98.8 on Grand Theft Auto IV. In addition to several hip-hop remixes, English electronic duo Moto Blanco provided the official dance mix for the song.

== Music video ==
The music video premiered on BET's Access Granted on February 28, 2007. Three remixes were officially released: one featuring Yung Joc, a second featuring Joe Budden, and a third featuring Lil Wayne, Big Boi, and Chamillionaire. The video has over 49 million views on Lloyd's official YouTube channel.

== Remixes ==
- "Get It Shawty" (Remix) featuring Yung Joc
- "Get It Shawty" (Official Remix) featuring Lil Wayne, Big Boi and Chamillionaire
- "Get It Shawty" (NY Remix) featuring Ja Rule, Joe Budden and Jim Jones
- "Get It Shawty" (Remix Part I) featuring Missy Elliott and Yung Joc
- "Get It Shawty" (Remix Part II) featuring Joe Budden, Missy Elliott and Yung Joc
- "Get It Shawty" (Murda Remix) featuring Ja Rule and Big Boi
- "Get It Shawty" (Remix) featuring Nina Sky and Yung Joc
- "Get It Shawty" (Remix) featuring Joe Budden
- "Get It Shawty" (Remix) featuring Jim Jones
- "Get It Shawty" (Remix) featuring Drake
- "Get It Shawty" (Remix) featuring Cory Bold
- "Get It Shawty" (Remix) featuring Gryffin
- "Get It Shawty" (Moto Blanco Radio Mix)
- "Get It Shawty" (Moto Blanco Vocal Mix)
- "Get It Shawty" (Moto Blanco Dub)
- "Get It Shawty" (Instrumental)
- "Get It Shawty" (A cappella)

== Charts ==
=== Weekly charts ===
Chart (2007)	Peak position
Scotland Singles (OCC)	46
UK Singles (OCC)	72
UK Hip Hop/R&B (OCC)	5
US Billboard Hot 100	16
US Hot R&B/Hip-Hop Songs (Billboard)	4
US Pop Airplay (Billboard)	26
US Rhythmic Airplay (Billboard)	2

=== Year-end charts ===
Chart (2007)	Position
US Billboard Hot 100	51
US Hot R&B/Hip-Hop Songs (Billboard)	40
US Rhythmic (Billboard)	12

== Certifications ==
Region	Certification	Certified units/sales
Canada (Music Canada)	Gold	40,000^{‡}
United States (RIAA)	2× Platinum	2,000,000^{‡}
^{‡} Sales+streaming figures based on certification alone.
