= Southside (Lloyd album) =

Studio album by Lloyd
- Released: July 20, 2004
- Genre: R&B
- Length: 65:12
- Labels: Island Def Jam; The Inc.
- Producers: Irv Gotti (also exec.); Joyce Irby (also exec.); Teddy Bishop; Jasper Cameron; Corron Cole; Demi Doc; Artie Green; T.W. Hale; Rodney "Darkchid" Jerkins; Indiana Joan; Jimi Kendrix; Wally Morris; Chink Santana

Lloyd chronology
Southside (2004)	Street Love (2007)

Singles from Southside
- 1. "Southside" Released: May 8, 2004; 2. "Hey Young Girl" Released: August 14, 2004

Southside is the debut studio album by American R&B singer Lloyd. It was released by The Island Def Jam Music Group and Irv Gotti's The Inc. Records on July 20, 2004 in the United States. Lloyd teamed with several of record producers to work on the album, including frequent The Inc. producers such as Chink Santana, Demi Doc, Jasper Camero, and label head Irv Gotti as well as Teddy Bishop, Corron Cole, Artie Green, Jimi Kendrix, and Rodney "Darkchid" Jerkins, among others.

The album garnered largely mixed reviews from music critics, some of whom felt that it lacked substance. Southside debuted and reached number three on the US Billboard Top R&B/Hip-Hop Albums chart and number eleven on the US Billboard 200, selling over 67,000 copies in its first week. The album produced the successful top thirty Billboard Hot 100 hit, "the title track" with label-mate Ashanti. A second and final single, "Hey Young Girl, was released in August 2004.

== Background ==
Lloyd began his musical career as a member of the preteen-boy band N-Toon, which was formed by former Klymaxx member Joyce Irby in 1996. The band made a minor dent with the DreamWorks single "Ready" but dissolved after its debut album. Irby later secured a recording contract for then 14-year-old Lloyd with Magic Johnson's MCA Records-distributed MJM label. though the label suspended operations before releasing his album. On his return to Atlanta, Lloyd eventually signed with record executive Irv Gotti's Murder Inc. Records, an imprint of Def Jam Recordings in 2003 to pursue a solo career.

== Promotion ==
The album's lead single, "Southside", featuring label-mate Ashanti, became a success on the US Billboard Hot 100, peaking at number twenty-four, while also reaching number 13 the US Hot R&B/Hip-Hop Songs chart. The follow-up single "Hey Young Girl" was released on August 14, 2004. It was commercially less successful, as it peaked at number 61 on Billboard's Hot R&B/Hip-Hop Songs chart.

== Reception ==
Professional ratings
Review scores
Source	Rating
AllMusic	3/5 stars
Now	2/5 Ns

David Jeffries of AllMusic gave the album three out of five stars. He wrote: "While there are no 'deep' moments on Southside, the glittery production is alive and inspired and Lloyd's cool persona never fails [...] Gotti never gives Lloyd anything lyrically out of his reach, and music-wise he's sprinkled a bunch of clever samples over the down-low beats." Jason Richards from Now found that on his "debut album, the tatted-up vocalist sings a duet with his labelmate Ashanti, and it's very hard to figure out who's who because he sounds so much like a woman. It's even more confusing – because you'd think Ja Rule and Irv Gotti would try to fortify their label with gangsta cred after getting crushed for months on end by everyone on Shady and G-Unit, rather than dropping a wimpy, languid record by an 18-year-old New Orleans singer no one's ever heard of. I've tasted tap water with more flavour than this overlong cliché on wax."

== Commercial performance ==
Southside debuted and peaked at number three on Billboard's US Top R&B/Hip-Hop Albums and number eleven on the US Billboard 200, selling over 67,000 copies in its first week. By March 2006, Southside had sold 322,000 copies domestically, according to Nielsen SoundScan. The album was certified Gold by the Recording Industry Association of America (RIAA) on October 16, 2024, based on sales and streaming figures in the United States.

== Track listing ==
Southside track listing
No.	Title	Writer(s)	Producer(s)	Length
1.	"ATL Tales"/"Ride Wit Me" (featuring Ja Rule)	Lloyd Polite; Jeffrey Atkins; Kendred Smith; Irving Lorenzo; Christine McVie; Eddy Quintela	Jimi Kendrix; Irv Gotti	5:16
2.	"Hey Young Girl"	Polite; Corron Cole; James Bunton; Ricky Walters	Cole	3:57
3.	"Southside" (featuring Ashanti)	Traci Hale; Wirlie Morris; Tab Nkhereanye	Morris; Gotti^{[a]}	4:37
4.	"Feelin You"	Polite; Andre Parker; Lorenzo	Santana; Gotti	4:08
5.	"Take It Low"	Polite; Demetrius McGhee; Lorenzo	Demi-Doc; Gotti	4:28
6.	"Hustler" (featuring Chink Santana)	Polite; Parker; Lorenzo; J. McGuan	Santana; Gotti	3:37
7.	"My Life"	Polite; McGhee; Lorenzo	Demi-Doc; Gotti	4:07
8.	"Cadillac Love" (featuring Taniya Walter)	Polite; Jasper Cameron; Joyce Irby	Jasper; Indiana Joan	3:55
9.	"Trance" (featuring Lil Wayne)	Polite; Dwayne Carter; Rodney Jerkins; Fred Jerkins III	Jerkins	4:42
10.	"Feels So Right"	Polite; McGhee; Lorenzo; Willie Hutch	Demi-Doc; Gotti	4:38
11.	"This Way"	Polite; Teddy Bishop; Sean Garrett; Gregory Charley	Bishop	4:07
12.	"Miss Lady (Interlude)"	Devine Evans; C. Liana; Greg Anderson	Evans	1:45
13.	"Sweet Dreams"	Polite; Cameron; Charlie Foxx; Inez Foxx	Jasper	4:12
14.	"I'm a G" (featuring 4 Ever)	Polite; Irby	Joan	3:48
15.	"Yesterday"	Polite; Artie Green; Lorenzo	Green; Gotti	5:21
16.	"Southside (Remix)" (featuring Scarface and Ashanti)	Hale; Morris; Nkhereanye	Morris; Gotti^{[a]}	5:18
Total length:				65:12

Notes

- ^{^[a]} signifies a co-producer

Samples credits

- "Ride Wit Me" contains samples from the Fleetwood Mac recording "Little Lies", written by Christine McVie and Eddy Quintela.
- "Hey Young Girl" contains an interpolation of "Hey Young World", written by Ricky Walters.
- "Feels So Right" contains a sample from "Brothers Gonna Work It Out", written and performed by Willie Hutch.
- "Sweet Dreams" contains an interpolation of "Mockingbird" written by Charlie Foxx and Inez Foxx.

== Credits and personnel ==
Credits for Southside adapted from Allmusic.

Performers and musicians

- Greg "Neo" Anderson – keyboards
- Devine Evans – keyboards
- Devine Evans – drum programming
- Lloyd Jr. Polite – backing vocals
- Irv Polie – executive producer
- Wirlie Morris – drum programming
- Shawn Smith – keyboards
- Chink Santana – guitar
- Alonzo "Novel" Stevenson – backing vocals

Technical

- Won Allen – engineer
- David Ashton – engineer
- Teddy Bishop – engineer
- Leslie Braithwaite – mixing
- Milwaukee "Protools King" Buck – engineer
- Jasper Cameron – vocal producer
- Tom Coyne – mastering
- Indiana Joan – vocal producer
- Carlton Lynn – engineer
- Lloyd – vocal producer
- Chris "Gotti" Lorenzo – A&R
- Wirlie Morris – engineer
- Rick Patrick – creative director
- Patrick Reynolds – A&R
- Andrew Slade – engineer
- Alvin Speights – mixing
- Brian Springer – mixing
- Carol Vaughn, Jr. – A&R

== Charts ==
=== Weekly charts ===
Weekly chart performance for Southside
Chart (2004)	Peak position
US Billboard 200	11
US Top R&B/Hip-Hop Albums (Billboard)	3

=== Year-end charts ===
Year-end chart performance for Southside
Chart (2004)	Position
US Top R&B/Hip-Hop Albums (Billboard)	91

== Certifications ==
Certifications for Southside
Region	Certification	Certified units/sales
United States (RIAA)	Gold	500,000^{‡}
^{‡} Sales+streaming figures based on certification alone.
