= Lloyd (singer) =

American singer

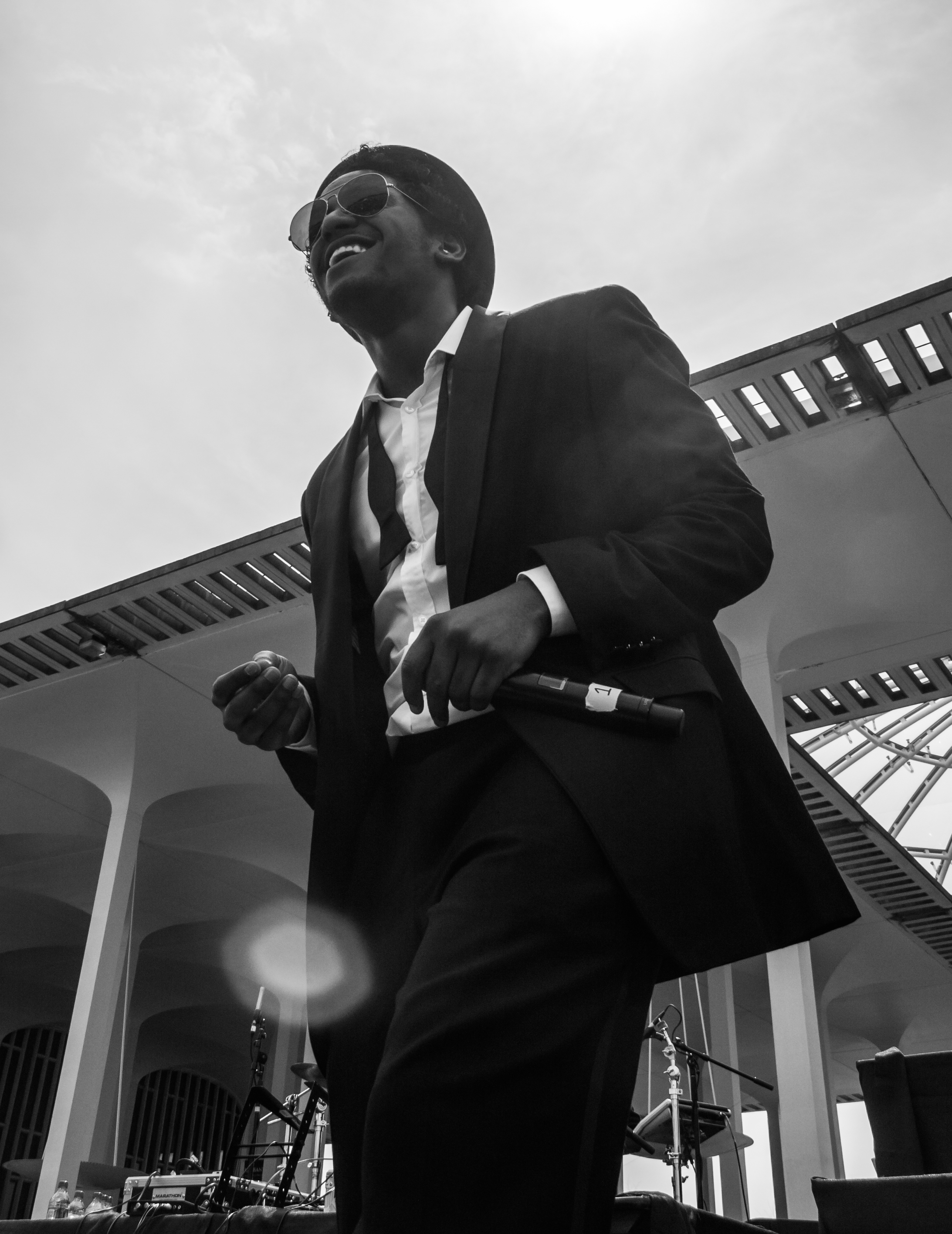
- Polite in 2012

Background information
- Born: Lloyd Polite Jr. January 3, 1986 (age 40); New Orleans, Louisiana, U.S.
- Origin: Decatur, Georgia, U.S.
- Genre: R&B
- Occupations: Singer; songwriter; actor
- Works: Lloyd discography
- Years active: 1996–present
- Labels: Young Goldie; EMPIRE; Interscope; Zone 4; Universal Motown; The Inc.; Sho'nuff; Island Def Jam; MJM
- Formerly of: N-Toon
- Children: 2
- Website: officiallloyd.com

Lloyd Polite Jr. (born January 3, 1986) is an American R&B singer. Born in New Orleans, Louisiana, and raised in Decatur, Georgia, he began his musical career as a member of the preteen-boy band N-Toon, which was formed by Joyce Irby in 1996. The group disbanded in 2001, and Polite signed with record executive Irv Gotti's Murder Inc. Records, an imprint of Def Jam Recordings in 2003 to pursue a solo career. His 2004 debut single, "Southside" (featuring Ashanti) peaked within the top 40 of the Billboard Hot 100 and led his first album Southside (2004), which entered the Billboard 200 at number 11. His second album, Street Love (2007) debuted at number two on the chart and was supported by the Billboard Hot 100-top 20 singles "You" (featuring Lil Wayne) and "Get It Shawty".

His third album, Lessons in Love (2008), peaked at number seven on Billboard 200. He guest appeared on Young Money's 2009 single, "BedRock", which peaked at number two on the Billboard Hot 100 and yielded his furthest commercial success. After his departure from Murder Inc., he signed with Atlanta-based producer Polow da Don's record label Zone 4, an imprint of Interscope Records in March 2010. His fourth album, King of Hearts (2011), peaked at number ten on the Billboard 200 and was supported by the moderately-performing singles "Lay It Down" and "Dedication to My Ex (Miss That)" (featuring André 3000 and Lil Wayne)—the latter saw further success internationally. Following a five-year hiatus, he independently released his 2016 single "Tru", which received platinum certification by the Recording Industry Association of America (RIAA). It preceded his fifth and first self-released album, Tru (2018).

In March 2019, Polite joined a lineup of prominent early-2000s contemporary R&B artists for The Millennium Tour, which quickly became one of that year's most popular shows. Outside of music, Polite first acted in the 2005 UPN television series One on One, in which he starred as the love interest of main cast member Spirit—played by Sicily. He made his film debut as Gregory Williams—founding member of Switch—in TV One's original biopic, The Bobby Debarge Story.

== Early life ==
Lloyd Polite Jr. was born on January 3, 1986, in New Orleans, Louisiana, to Lloyd Polite Sr. and Robin Lewis Polite. He grew up in the Calliope Projects in Central City, New Orleans and then moved to Decatur, Georgia. In Decatur, Polite found his desire to sing and later relocated to New York City where he met Irv Gotti.

== Musical career ==
=== 2004–2007: Southside and Street Love ===
In 2004, Polite was discovered and signed to Irv Gotti's The Inc. as a solo artist and released his debut album, Southside, on July 20, 2004. It debuted at number 11 on the US Billboard 200 and number three on the Top R&B/Hip-Hop Albums charts. The album's lead single, "Southside", featuring R&B singer Ashanti, managed to peak at number 24 on the Billboard Hot 100 and number 13 on the Top R&B/Hip-Hop Songs charts. The second and final single, "Hey Young Girl" was released in August 2004 and peaked at number 61 on the Top R&B/Hip-Hop Songs chart. Later that year he featured on 8Ball & MJG's "Forever" and Tango Redd's "Let's Cheat". In 2004, Polite was featured on label-mate Ja Rule's "Caught Up"; the song saw minor success in the United States, reaching number 65 on the Top R&B/Hip-Hop Songs chart. However, on the UK Singles Chart the song peaked at number 20.

The singer reentered the recording studios to begin work with producers Bryan-Michael Cox, James Lackey, Jazze Pha, Big Reese and Jasper Cameron and The Inc.'s 7 Aurelius. Released on March 13, 2007, Street Love debuted at number two on the US Billboard 200 and Top R&B/Hip-Hop albums charts, with sales of 145,000 copies emerging as Lloyd's highest debut and biggest first week. It eventually received a gold certification, and has sold over half a million copies domestically. The album's lead single, Jasper Cameron-penned "You", featured rapper Lil Wayne, was a big commercial success, becoming his first top ten single on the Hot 100. In addition, it reached the top position on the Billboard Hot R&B/Hip-Hop Songs chart. The single reached number 45 in the United Kingdom and number 25 in New Zealand. The second single "Get It Shawty" reached number 16 on the Billboard Hot 100 and number four on the Top R&B/Hip-Hop Songs charts. It also reached number 37 in the United Kingdom. The third and final single, "Player's Prayer", was released and peaked at number 74 on the Top R&B/Hip-Hop Songs chart. The song was not promoted and didn't receive a music video. Later in 2007, he was featured on Huey's "When I Hustle" and Dem Franchize Boyz's "Turn Heads", both songs saw minor success in the United States, reaching number 80 and 75 on the Top R&B/Hip-Hop Songs chart.

=== 2008–2009: Lessons in Love ===
Lessons in Love was released on August 4, 2008. "The title concept derives from a schoolboy fantasy of mine, where I become a professor of a classroom full of gorgeous girls, and I feel the best thing I can give them that's really worth having is lessons in love!" he said about the issues worked into the tracks. The album debuted at number seven on the Billboard 200 and number one on the Top R&B/Hip-Hop Albums charts, with moderately successful first-week sales 51,000 — about half as many as his previous effort, number two album Street Love. "How We Do It (Around My Way)", featured rapper Ludacris, was released as the first single, peaking at number 77 on the US Billboard Top R&B/Hip-Hop Songs chart and number 75 on the UK charts. Due to the low success of the song, it only appeared on select versions of the album as a bonus track. The second single, "Girls Around the World", featured Lil Wayne and was a moderate hit. It peaked at number 64 on the Billboard Hot 100 and number 13 on the Top R&B/Hip-Hop Songs charts. The third and final single was "Year of the Lover". The single version featured rapper Plies. It only peaked at number one on the Billboard Bubbling Under R&B/Hip-Hop Singles.

In June 2009, it was announced that Polite would depart from The Inc. Records. Lloyd stated that he was "focusing on just growing in general". A song titled "Pusha", produced by The Runners written by Polite, Raymond "Ray-Ray" Gordon, Sean "Slim" McMillion, and The Monarch and featuring Juelz Santana was leaked online. Juelz Santana was later replaced on the song by Lil Wayne but later both verses were put together and was released as the lead single from his EP, Like Me: The Young Goldie EP. Polite also collaborated with Lil Wayne on the song "BedRock" which is the second single from Lil Wayne's record label Young Money compilation album. On March 13 it was confirmed that Lloyd signed to Interscope Records.

=== 2010–2013: King of Hearts ===
In May 2010, Polite teamed up with fellow New Orleans native Mystikal and recorded "Set Me Free". The video was shot primarily in the Calliope Projects of New Orleans. The song featured heavy brass sounds and a sample of "Unchain My Heart" by Ray Charles. On July 25, 2010, Lloyd announced via Twitter that his new album will be entitled King of Hearts. It was released on July 5, 2011, and on August 16, 2010, Polite released the first single entitled "Lay It Down". The second single was "Cupid" and the third single released was "Dedication to My Ex (Miss That)"; to date the single is Lloyd's biggest international hit peaking at number three on the Australian and UK charts. The song features André 3000 of OutKast and is narrated by Lil Wayne.

On October 29, 2012, Polite released his first mixtape The Playboy Diaries Vol. 1. It features Lil Wayne, August Alsina, Trae Tha Truth among others. In January 2013 Polite released a song called "Twerk Off" featuring rapper Juicy J and was produced by Drumma Boy.

=== 2016–present: Tru ===
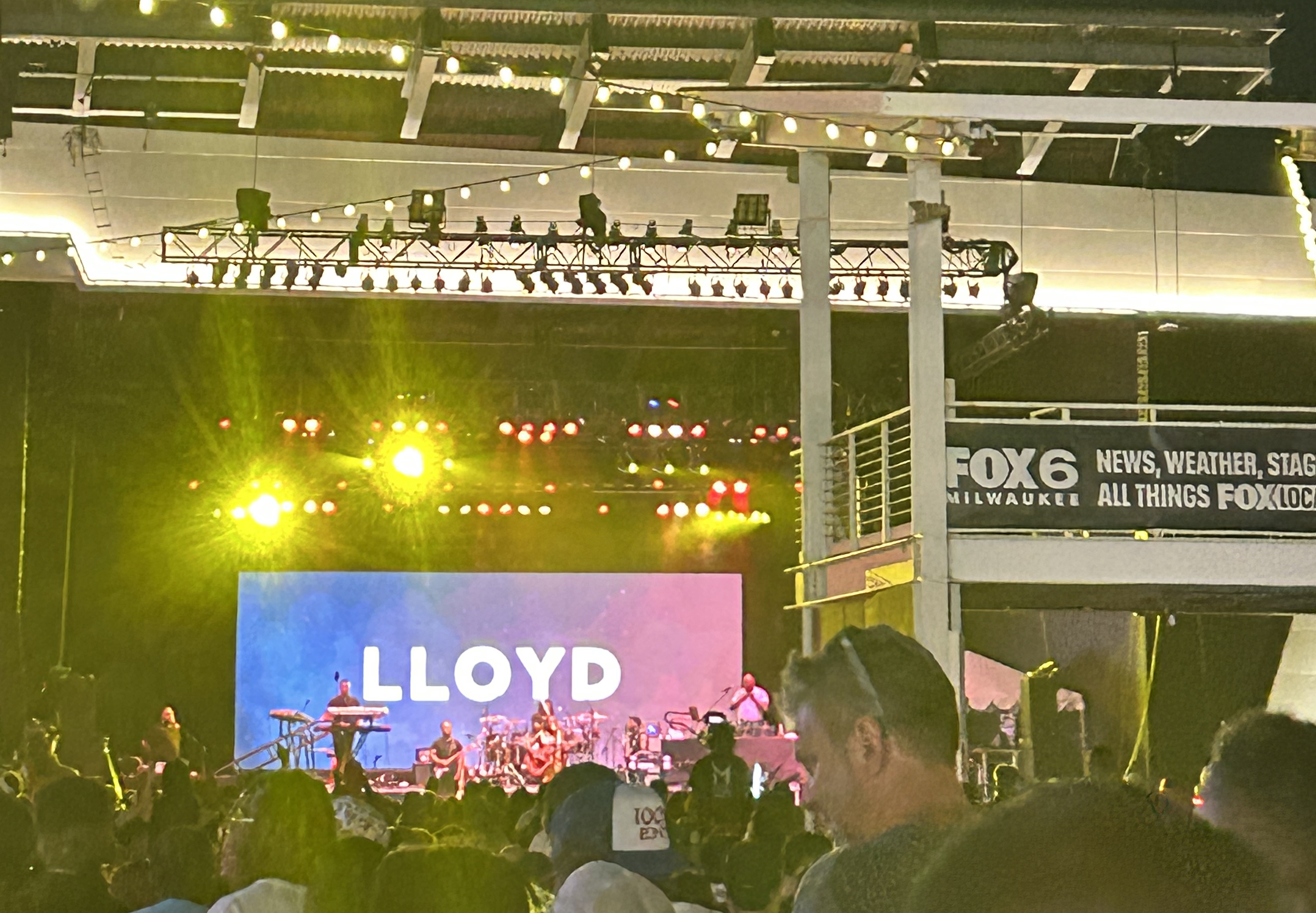
Lloyd performing at Summerfest in 2024

On May 6, 2016, he released his first single in five years titled "Tru", with the audio for the song released on YouTube 12 days later. On June 23, 2016, during an interview, Polite revealed that he had signed a new distribution deal with Empire. Lloyd announced the release of his fifth studio album titled Out My Window on October 25, 2016. On November 7 Polite announced via his Instagram that he would be releasing a new EP before his album on December 9, 2016, titled Tru.

On July 9, 2018, Polite released "Caramel" as the first single from his album Tru. The album was released on August 31, 2018.

== Personal life ==
On September 3, 2010, Polite cut off his signature long hair and donated it to charity. On July 6, 2011, Lloyd revealed a new tattoo of "Guns & Roses" that was tattooed on the back of his head. On March 14, 2016, it was announced and revealed that Lloyd had earned his GED certificate, encouraging his fans to do the same if they had not finished high school. In an August 2016 interview with Sway Calloway, Polite explains his hiatus through the lyrics of his song "Tru", expressing how he lost an unborn child to an abortion and that it "left a big hole", while also detailing other family issues. In September 2017, Polite's girlfriend gave birth to their son River. The two welcomed their daughter in late 2018.

== Awards and nominations ==
Award	Year	Nominee(s)	Category	Result	Ref.
Teen Choice Awards	2007	Himself	Choice Male Breakout Artist	Nominated	
Teen Choice Awards	2007	"Get It Shawty"	Choice R&B Track	Nominated	

== Discography ==
Studio albums

- Southside (2004)
- Street Love (2007)
- Lessons in Love (2008)
- King of Hearts (2011)
- Tru (2018)
