= Big Reese =

- Born: Maurice Sinclair
- Origin: Atlanta,Georgia
- Genres: Hip hop; R&B
- Occupations: Rapper; singer; songwriter; record producer

Maurice Sinclair, better known as his stage name Big Reese (or simply Reese) is an American rapper, singer, songwriter, and record producer, who was a member of the trio P.A.

== Biography ==
Big Reese emerged from the Organized Noize production camp helping to frame the Atlanta wing of hip-hop's rising force and becoming a number hitmaker. Big Reese was also originally a member of the rap group P.A. Big Reese began growing as an artist and a record producer. He found P.A. a home at DreamWorks Records and began production on their debut album.

In 2001, Big Reese split from the group and DreamWorks in pursuit of a solo production career. Big Reese scored a song for the movie 2 Fast 2 Furious. The song "Ride", personally chosen by director John Singleton and music supervisor Paul Stewart, was performed and produced by Big Reese. Having produced songs for new as well as multi-platinum selling artists such as Mario, TLC, Andre 3000, Pink, T.I., Sleepy Brown, Mystikal, Da Brat, Dan Talevski, Sterling Simms, Esmee Denters, Cherish, and more. Big Reese's production credits are just as impressive as his album credentials. His most recent accomplishments include Mariah Carey's "Shake It Off" (remix) featuring Jay-Z and Young Jeezy, Rick Ross's "Street Life" featuring Lloyd, Young Dro's "It Ain't Over" and Lloyd's "You" featuring Lil Wayne which went #1 on Billboard Hot R&B/Hip-Hop Songs and #1 on Billboard Hot 100 Airplay chart also #1 on the R&R charts and became the number one Ringtone in the country. His work with Lloyd was not yet finished because along came one of the hottest remixes to hit the airwaves "You" featuring Nas and Andre 3000. He also produced T.I.'s "Hustlin'" featured on the T.I. vs T.I.P. exclusive album and Mario's Lay in My Bed on his album Go.

In 2010, Reservoir Media Management acquired 100% of Big Reese's publishing assets which had formerly been administered by TVT Music Enterprises, LLC. Reese produced Lloyd's single "Girls Around the World" featuring Lil Wayne off Lloyd's, Lessons In Love. He has a record label by the name of Sonic Jungle Records. The 1st release is by J.Monroe, a female singer from Atlanta. He is the executive producer on her album, and her debut single, "Hey Blondie".
