= Player's Prayer =

Single by Lloyd

from the album Street Love
- Released: July 17, 2007 (U.S.)
- Recorded: 2007
- Genre: R&B
- Length: 4:11
- Label: Young Goldie Music, The Inc., Sho'nuff, Universal
- Songwriters: Lloyd, Jasper Cameron
- Producer: Jasper Cameron

Lloyd singles chronology
"Get It Shawty" (2007)	"Player's Prayer" (2007)	"Secret Admirer" (2007)

"Player's Prayer" is the third and final single Lloyd's second album Street Love. The track was produced and co-written by Jasper Cameron. Its release was confirmed by FMQB. The single was only released in the United States, where it only reached #74 on Billboard Hot R&B/Hip-Hop Songs chart. Although the song was a favorite among many, the single lacked promotion and didn't receive a music video.

== Charts ==
Chart (2007)	Peak position
U.S. Billboard Hot R&B/Hip-Hop Songs	74
