= Truss (surname) =

Truss is a surname. Notable people with the name include:

- John Truss (born 1947), British mathematician, father of Liz
- Liz Truss (born 1975), former UK prime minister
- Lynne Truss (born 1955), British writer and journalist
- Warren Truss (born 1948), Australian politician
- Xavier Truss (born 2001), American football player
