= Tru (Lloyd album) =

Studio album by Lloyd
- Released: August 31, 2018
- Recorded: 2016–18
- Genre: R&B
- Length: 46:31
- Labels: Young Goldie; Empire
- Producers: A Major; J.U.S.T.I.C.E. League; Jasper Cameron; Jerrett Goodly; Lloyd; $K; Slade Da Monsta

Lloyd chronology
King of Hearts (2011)	Tru (2018)

Singles from Tru
- 1. "Tru" Released: May 6, 2016

Tru (also labeled Tru LP to differentiate it from the EP) is the fifth studio album by American singer Lloyd, released on August 31, 2018, by Young Goldie Music and Empire Distribution. The album follows up to his 2011 album King of Hearts and the 2016 EP of the same name.

Tru features guest appearances from Lil Wayne, Rick Ross, Sevyn Streeter, Khujo Goodie, Curren$y, The Spelman Women’s Choir and Lloyd’s infant son, River. The album has sold over 85,000 copies including single sales (Tru bringing in most of the sales). The lead single "Tru" was certified platinum by the RIAA.

== Critical reception ==
Professional ratings
Review scores
Source	Rating
Exclaim!	5/10
HipHopDX	3.7/5

Writing for Exclaim!, A. Harmony concluded that "While there are a few takeaways for hardcore Lloyd fans ("Tru" in particular), for others, there isn't much to hold on to".

== Track listing ==
No.	Title	Writer(s)	Producer(s)	Length
1.	"Appreciation Day" (featuring Khujo Goodie)	Marcus Slade; Lloyd Polite	Slade Da Monsta; Lloyd	4:00
2.	"Blown" (featuring Curren$y)	Polite; Quinton Amey; Jarrett Goodly; Brandon Smith; Shante Franklin	Goodly; Lloyd	4:21
3.	"Holding" (featuring Lil Wayne)	Polite; Jasper Cameron; Jeremy Reid; Dwayne Carter	Cameron; Lloyd	3:26
4.	"My Bestie" (featuring Sevyn Streeter)	Polite; Akill Ernest; Amber Streeter	A Major; Lloyd	3:45
5.	"Caramel"	Polite; Cameron; Reid	Cameron; Lloyd	3:23
6.	"Excited"	Polite; Cameron	Cameron; Lloyd	4:20
7.	"Heavenly Body" (featuring Rick Ross)	Polite; Cameron; Reid; William Roberts	Cameron; Lloyd	4:29
8.	"Porcelain"	Polite; John McGhee; Ernest	A Major; $K; Lloyd	4:57
9.	"Infinity" (featuring River)	Polite; Cameron; Reid; Jairus Mozee	Cameron; Lloyd	5:19
10.	"Lil Sis" (featuring The Spelman Women’s Choir)	Polite; Cameron; Reid	Cameron; Lloyd	4:17
11.	"Tru"	Polite; Kevin Briggs; Kenny Bartolomei; Kevin Crowe; Erik Ortiz	J.U.S.T.I.C.E. League; Lloyd	4:15

== Charts ==
Chart (2018)	Peak position
US Top Current Albums (Billboard)	90
US Independent Albums (Billboard)	27
US R&B/Hip-Hop Album Sales (Billboard)	17

== Release history ==
Region	Date	Format	Label	Ref.
Various	August 31, 2018	Digital download; streaming	Young Goldie Music; Empire	
Various	October 5, 2018	CD	Young Goldie Music; Empire	
