= Lay It Down (Lloyd song) =

Single by Lloyd

from the album King of Hearts
- Released: August 31, 2010
- Recorded: 2010
- Genre: R&B
- Length: 4:01
- Label: Young Goldie Music; Interscope; Zone 4
- Songwriters: Esther Dean; Jamal Jones; Veronika Bozeman
- Producers: Polow da Don; Veronika "V." Bozeman (co.)

Lloyd singles chronology
"Feelin' Myself" (2010)	"Lay It Down" (2010)	"Let's Get It In" (2011)

"Lay It Down" is a song by American R&B singer Lloyd taken from his fourth studio album King of Hearts (2011). The track, which serves as the album's lead single, was produced by Polow da Don and samples Patti LaBelle's "Love, Need and Want You", as well as "Corn" by Zhnark. The single was originally released via YoungGoldie.com on August 15, 2010, and was released via iTunes on August 31, 2010.

== Music video ==
The music video was shot in Los Angeles, California and directed by Mickey Finnegan. It premiered on October 12, 2010, on BET's 106 & Park. The video has peaked at #4 on the show. K.D. Aubert plays the leading lady with Keri Hilson and Polow da Don making cameo appearances throughout the video. As of February 2024 the video has over 110 million views on Lloyd's YouTube channel.

== Remixes ==
In a radio interview, Lloyd revealed the song would have three official remixes.

The first official remix released for pop radio features rock drums and American rapper B.o.B, and background vocals from the group Rock City on January 21, 2011. It was sent to radio on March 1, 2011.

The second official remix, with fellow R&B singer R. Kelly was for urban radio. It was released on January 12, 2011 as "the G-Mix" and featured verses from Kelly and Jeezy along with new lyrics from Lloyd.

The third official remix featured a then unrevealed artist who people "wouldn't expect to hear." The third remix was released on December 29, 2010, entitled "Lay it Down Part II – A Tribute to the Legends." It features Patti LaBelle and pays tribute to singer Aretha Franklin and the late fellow singer Teena Marie.

All three of the remixes were included and released on a digital EP via iTunes on February 15, 2011.

R&B girl group RichGirl created a remix to the song, released on their Fall in Love with RichGirl mixtape.

R&B Artist K. Michelle also released an unofficial remix of the song.

== Charts ==
=== Weekly charts ===
Chart (2011)	Peak position
US Billboard Hot 100	64
US Hot R&B/Hip-Hop Songs (Billboard)	7
US Rhythmic Airplay (Billboard)	29

=== Year-end charts ===
Chart (2011)	Position
US Hot R&B/Hip-Hop Songs (Billboard)	38

== Certifications ==
Region	Certification	Certified units/sales
Canada (Music Canada)	Gold	40,000^{‡}
New Zealand (RMNZ)	Platinum	30,000^{‡}
United States (RIAA)	Platinum	1,000,000^{‡}
^{‡} Sales+streaming figures based on certification alone.

== Release history ==
Release dates and formats for "Lay It Down"
Region	Date	Format	Version	Label(s)	Ref.
United States	March 1, 2011	Mainstream airplay	B.o.B remix	Columbia	
