= You (Lloyd song) =

Single by Lloyd featuring Lil Wayne

from the album Street Love
- Released: October 23, 2006
- Genre: R&B; hip-hop
- Length: 4:33
- Label: The Inc., Sho'nuff, Universal
- Songwriters: Lloyd Polite, Dwayne Carter, Jasper Cameron, Gary Kemp, Maurice Sinclair, J. Pilkington
- Producers: Big Reese, Jasper Cameron

Lloyd singles chronology
"Southside (Remix)" (2004)	"You" (2006)	"Get It Shawty" (2007)

Lil Wayne singles chronology
"You Know What" (2006)	"You" (2006)	"Make It Rain" (2006)

"You" is a song by American R&B singer Lloyd, featuring rapper Lil Wayne. It was the lead single from Lloyd's sophomore studio album, Street Love (2007). "You" was produced by Big Reese and Jasper Cameron, and recorded in their basement. Lloyd himself reportedly leaked the track to an Atlanta radio station with the intention to receive airplay. Originally, the single featured Atlanta rapper Tango Redd, who was replaced with Lil Wayne before the official release. Notably, the chorus of "You" features an interpolation of Spandau Ballet's "True" (1983).

On February 17, 2007, "You" became Lloyd's first, and Lil Wayne's second, Top 10 single on the U.S. Billboard Hot 100, charting at No. 9 and becoming a radio favorite. The song also reached the No. 1 spot on Billboard's Hot R&B/Hip-Hop Songs chart, becoming both Lloyd and Lil Wayne's first number-one single on that chart. On the UK Singles Chart, the single debuted on May 28, 2007, at No. 66 on download sales alone, before rising to the No. 45 position.

== Critical reception ==
Rolling Stone listed "You" as the 83rd best R&B song of the 21st century.

== Music video ==
The music video (Directed by Fat Cats) features D. Woods, former member of the girl group Danity Kane and Amanda Saintana Ceus, as the leading lady. The video was inducted into the U.S. BET 106 & Park video hall of fame, after spending sixty-five days on the countdown, thirty-four of which were at number one.

== Remixes ==
The official remix (titled "I Want You (Remix)", track #15, on the album) features rappers André 3000 (of Outkast) and Nas, with two previously unheard verses by Lloyd. On the remix's leaked radio version, Lloyd's second verse from the original version of the song is heard after the chorus rather than the newly recorded verse from the album.

== Charts ==
=== Weekly charts ===
Chart (2006–2007)	Peak position
New Zealand (Recorded Music NZ)	25
Scottish Singles Sales (Official Charts)	73
UK Singles (Official Charts)	45
UK Hip Hop/R&B (Official Charts)	9
US Billboard Hot 100	9
US Hot R&B/Hip-Hop Songs (Billboard)	1
US Pop Airplay (Billboard)	21
US Rhythmic Airplay (Billboard)	1

=== Year-end charts ===
Chart (2007)	Position
US Billboard Hot 100	40
US Hot R&B/Hip-Hop Songs (Billboard)	6
US Rhythmic (Billboard)	7

== Certifications ==
Certifications for "You"
Region	Certification	Certified units/sales
Canada (Music Canada)	2× Platinum	160,000^{‡}
New Zealand (RMNZ)	3× Platinum	90,000^{‡}
United Kingdom (BPI)	Platinum	600,000^{‡}
United States (RIAA)	4× Platinum	4,000,000^{‡}
^{‡} Sales+streaming figures based on certification alone.

== See also ==
- List of number-one R&B singles of 2007 (U.S.)
