= Southside (Lloyd song) =

Single by Lloyd featuring Ashanti

from the album Southside
- Released: May 8, 2004; December 30, 2004 (Remix)
- Recorded: 2003
- Studio: Take Note Studios (Atlanta, GA); Crackhouse Studios (New York, NY)
- Length: 4:37
- Label: The Inc, Def Jam
- Songwriters: T. Hale, W. Morris, Thabiso Nkhereanye
- Producers: Wirlie Morris, Irv Gotti

Lloyd singles chronology
"Southside" (2004)	"Hey Young Girl" (2004)

Ashanti singles chronology
"Breakup 2 Makeup (Remix)" (2004)	"Southside" (2004)	"Wonderful" (2004)

"Southside" is the lead single by the American singer Lloyd, featuring Ashanti, from his debut album Southside (2004), released May 8, 2004, by The Inc. and Def Jam Records. The song was written by T. Hale, W. Morris, Tab and by the song's producer Jimi Kendrix. It peaked at No. 13 on the U.S. Billboard Hot R&B Songs chart, and peaked at No. 24 on the mainstream Billboard Hot 100. A remix also featured the rapper Scarface, along with Ashanti. The remix was released in December 2004 as the third and final single from the album.

== Music video ==
Released in June 2004, the original music video included Ja Rule making a cameo appearance, producer Irv Gotti portraying a flashy, wealthy father-figure to Lloyd's character, and Ashanti as his girlfriend, with whom he only communicates via cellphone.

The music video's remixed version features footage from the original intercut with a street scene, in which a shirtless Lloyd, Ashanti, and Scarface are seen outside of a barber shop.

"Southside" topped BET's 106 & Park daily music video countdown show for several days; Lloyd and Ashanti made an appearance and performed the song live together, on the video's third consecutive day at #1.

== Chart positions ==
=== Weekly charts ===
Chart (2004)	Peak position
US Billboard Hot 100	24
US Hot R&B/Hip-Hop Songs (Billboard)	13
US Pop Airplay (Billboard)	33

=== Year-end charts ===
Chart (2004)	Position
US Billboard Hot 100	84
US Hot R&B/Hip-Hop Songs (Billboard)	63

== Certifications ==
Region	Certification	Certified units/sales
Canada (Music Canada)	Gold	40,000^{‡}
New Zealand (RMNZ)	Gold	15,000^{‡}
United States (RIAA)	Platinum	1,000,000^{‡}
^{‡} Sales+streaming figures based on certification alone.

== Release history ==
Region	Date	Format(s)	Label(s)	Ref.
United States	April 26, 2004	Rhythmic contemporary · urban contemporary radio	Murder, Inc., Def Jam	
