= Tru (song) =

Single by Lloyd

from the EP Tru and the album Tru
- Released: May 6, 2016
- Recorded: 2015
- Genre: R&B
- Length: 4:15
- Label: Young Goldie; EMPIRE
- Songwriters: Lloyd Polite, Jr.; Erik "Rook" Ortiz; Kevin "Colione" Crowe; Kenny "Barto" Bartolomei
- Producer: J.U.S.T.I.C.E. League

Lloyd singles chronology
"Dedication to My Ex (Miss That)" (2011)	"Tru" (2016)	"Caramel" (2018)

Music video
- "Tru" on YouTube

"Tru" is a song by American singer-songwriter Lloyd, released on May 6, 2016, from his extended play of the same name (2016). Lloyd explains his hiatus through the lyrics of the song, expressing how he lost an unborn child to an abortion and that it "left a big hole", while also detailing other family issues. The song was also included on Lloyd's fifth studio album of the same name (2018).

== Charts ==
Chart (2016)	Peak position
US Bubbling Under Hot 100 (Billboard)	13
US Hot R&B/Hip-Hop Songs (Billboard)	49

== Certifications ==
Region	Certification	Certified units/sales
United States (RIAA)	Platinum	1,000,000^{‡}
^{‡} Sales+streaming figures based on certification alone.
