= Exodus (Ja Rule album) =

Greatest hits album by Ja Rule
- Released: December 6, 2005
- Recorded: 1999–2005
- Genre: Hip hop
- Length: 71:30
- Label: The Inc.; Def Jam
- Producer: Irv Gotti; Chink Santana

Ja Rule chronology
R.U.L.E. (2004)	Exodus (2005)	The Mirror (2009)

Professional ratings
Review scores
Source	Rating
Allmusic	3.5/5 stars
RapReviews	(5/10)

Exodus is a 2005 greatest hits album by rapper Ja Rule. He had released an album every year since 1999, but in 2005, with no new album planned, The Inc. released this greatest hits album featuring songs such as "Mesmerize" and "Wonderful".

Irv Gotti was forced to release one more album from Ja and Ashanti to honor his contract with Def Jam. Universal did not want to support a full LP by either artist, so two greatest hits sets were released. The version of "It's Murda" on this album is shortened and not the original.

The album was also made in an edited version, which lacks some censorship in songs due to different times the songs were edited.

The album debuted on the Billboard 200 at number 107 and peaked at number 50 on the UK albums chart.

== Track listing ==
Credits adapted from the album's liner notes.

No.	Title	Writer(s)	Producer(s)	Length
1.	"Exodus" (Intro)	Jeffrey Atkins; Seven Aurelius; Irving Lorenzo; Anthony Hawkins; Charles Hawkins; Veesee Veasey	Seven Aurelius; Irv Gotti	4:05
2.	"Me"	Atkins; Marlon McGregor; Lorenzo	Arizona Slim; Irv Gotti	4:23
3.	"Holla, Holla" (from Venni Vetti Vecci)	Atkins; Taiwan Green; Lorenzo	Tai; Irv Gotti	4:24
4.	"It's Murda" (featuring DMX & Jay-Z) (from Venni Vetti Vecci)	Atkins; Tyrone Fyffe; Earl Simmons; Shawn Carter	Tyrone Fyffe; Irv Gotti^{[a]}; Richard "Love" Marshall^{[a]}	3:15
5.	"Put It on Me" (featuring Vita) (from Rule 3:36)	Atkins; Paul Walcott; Lorenzo; Taheem Crocker	Tru Stylze; Irv Gotti	4:23
6.	"I Cry" (featuring Lil' Mo (from Rule 3:36)	Atkins; Robert Mays; Lorenzo; Cynthia Loving; Kenny Gamble; Leon Huff	Lil' Rob; Irv Gotti	5:17
7.	"Livin' It Up" (featuring Case) (from Pain Is Love)	Atkins; Mays; Lorenzo; Stevie Wonder	Lil' Rob; Irv Gotti	4:18
8.	"Always on Time" (featuring Ashanti) (from Pain Is Love)	Atkins; Aurelius; Lorenzo	Irv Gotti	4:03
9.	"Ain't It Funny (Murder Remix)" (featuring Jennifer Lopez & Caddillac Tah) (from J to tha L–O! The Remixes)	Ashanti Douglas; Atkins; Crocker; Aurelius; Lorenzo; Craig Mack; Osten Harvey, Jr.	Seven Aurelius; Irv Gotti	3:57
10.	"Thug Lovin'" (featuring Bobby Brown) (from The Last Temptation)	Atkins; Andre Parker; Lorenzo; Wonder	Chink Santana; Irv Gotti	4:58
11.	"Mesmerize" (featuring Ashanti) (from The Last Temptation)	Atkins; Douglas; A. Parker; Lorenzo; Thom Bell; Linda Creed	Chink Santana; Irv Gotti	4:42
12.	"Clap Back" (from Blood in My Eye)	Atkins; Scott Storch; Lorenzo	Scott Storch; Irv Gotti^{[a]}	5:04
13.	"New York" (featuring Fat Joe & Jadakiss) (from R.U.L.E.)	Atkins; Joseph Cartagena; Jason Phillips; Andre Lyon; Marcello Valenzano; Lorenzo; Lawrence Parker	Cool & Dre; Irv Gotti^{[a]}	4:21
14.	"Wonderful" (featuring R. Kelly & Ashanti) (from R.U.L.E.)	Atkins; Lorenzo; Kendred Smith; Robert Kelly	Jimi Kendrix; Irv Gotti	4:30
15.	"Never Again" (from Pain Is Love)	Atkins; Aurelius; Lorenzo	Irv Gotti	4:23
16.	"Daddy's Little Baby" (featuring Ronald Isley) (from Venni Vetti Vecci)	Atkins; Lorenzo; Edward Hinson; Ronald Isley; O'Kelly Isley Jr.; Rudolph Isley; Ernie Isley; Marvin Isley; Chris Jasper	Self; Irv Gotti^{[a]}	5:21
17.	"Love Me Hate Me" (from Rule 3:36)	Atkins; Mays; Lorenzo	Lil' Rob; Irv Gotti; Ja Rule^{[a]}	4:44
18.	"Exodus" (Outro)	Atkins; James Olowokere; A. Parker	Milwaukee Buck; Irv Gotti; Chink Santana^{[a]}	3:32

Notes

- ^{^[a]} signifies a co-producer.

Sample credits

- "Exodus (Intro)" contains samples from "Lyin'", written by Anthony Hawkins, Charles Hawkins, and Veesee Veasey, performed by Black Merda.
- "I Cry" contains a sample from "Cry Together", written by Kenny Gamble and Leon Huff, performed by The O'Jays.
- "Livin' It Up" contains excerpts from "Do I Do", written by Stevie Wonder.
- "Ain't It Funny (Murder Remix)" contains a portion of "Flava in Ya Ear", written by Craig Mack and Osten Harvey, Jr., performed by Craig Mack.
- "Thug Lovin'" contains interpolations from "Knocks Me Off My Feet", written by Stevie Wonder.
- "Mesmerize" contains interpolations from "Stop, Look, Listen", written by Thom Bell and Linda Creed.
- "New York" contains interpolations from "100 Guns", written by Lawrence Parker.
- "Daddy's Little Baby" contains an interpolation of "Voyage To Atlantis", written by Ronald Isley, O'Kelly Isley Jr., Rudolph Isley, Ernie Isley, Marvin Isley, and Chris Jasper.

== Charts ==
=== Weekly charts ===
Weekly chart performance for Exodus
Chart (2005–2006)	Peak position
UK Albums (OCC)	50
UK R&B Albums (OCC)	8
US Billboard 200	107
US Top R&B/Hip-Hop Albums (Billboard)	23

== Certifications ==
Region	Certification	Certified units/sales
United Kingdom (BPI)	Silver	60,000^{‡}
^{‡} Sales+streaming figures based on certification alone.
