= Reign (song) =

Single by Ja Rule

from the album The Last Temptation
- Released: June 30, 2003
- Studio: Right Track (New York City)
- Genre: Hip hop
- Length: 4:02
- Label: Murder Inc.; Def Jam
- Songwriters: Jeffery Atkins; Irv Gotti; 7 Aurelius; David Paich; Jeff Porcaro
- Producers: Irv Gotti; 7 Aurelius

Ja Rule singles chronology
"Mesmerize" (2002)	"Reign" (2003)	"Clap Back" (2003)

"Reign" (originally known as "Murder Reigns" and also known as "The Reign") is a song by American rapper Ja Rule, released in June 2003 as the third and final single from his fourth studio album, The Last Temptation (2002). It was written by Ja Rule, 7 Aurelius and Irv Gotti and produced by the latter two. The song contains vocals from Celeste Scalone and samples "Africa" by Toto, thus crediting band members David Paich and Jeff Porcaro as co-writers. In the UK, the song was titled "Reigns" (dropping the "Murder" in line with Murder Inc. Records' then-rebrand to The Inc. Records) and released as a double A-side with "Clap Back", the first single from Ja Rule's 2003 album Blood in My Eye.

== Music video ==
The song's music video dramatizes the January 2003 raid of Murder Inc. Records' offices in New York City by the FBI over the label's connections to drug lord Kenneth McGriff. It contains a cameo by Patrick Swayze as one of the FBI officers. The video also depicts a trial in which Irv Gotti and Murder Inc. are exonerated by a jury.

== Track listing ==
Australian and European CD single

1. "Reign" (radio) – 4:08
2. "Reign" (album version) – 4:02
3. "Reign" (instrumental) – 4:33

UK double A-side single

1. "Clap Back" – 4:57
2. "Reigns" – 4:02
3. "Clap Back" (instrumental) – 5:05
4. "Clap Back"/"Reigns" (music video)

== Charts ==
=== Weekly charts ===
Weekly chart performance for "Reign"
Chart (2003)	Peak position
Australia (ARIA)	5
Austria (Ö3 Austria Top 40)	10
Europe (Eurochart Hot 100)	14
Germany (GfK)	4
New Zealand (Recorded Music NZ)	35
Scottish Singles Sales (Official Charts) with "Clap Back"	15
Switzerland (Schweizer Hitparade)	8
UK Singles (Official Charts) with "Clap Back"	9
UK Hip Hop/R&B (Official Charts) with "Clap Back"	3
US Bubbling Under R&B/Hip-Hop Singles (Billboard)	2

=== Year-end charts ===
Year-end chart performance for "Reign"
Chart (2003)	Position
Australia (ARIA)	29
Austria (Ö3 Austria Top 40)	64
Germany (Media Control GfK)	31
Switzerland (Schweizer Hitparade)	52
UK Singles (OCC)	189

== Certifications ==
Certifications for "Reign"
Region	Certification	Certified units/sales
Australia (ARIA)	Platinum	70,000^{^}
Germany (BVMI)	Gold	150,000^{‡}
^{^} Shipments figures based on certification alone.^{‡} Sales+streaming figures based on certification alone.
