= The Mirror (Ja Rule album) =

Mixtape by Ja Rule
- Released: July 31, 2009
- Recorded: 2006–2007
- Genre: Hip hop
- Label: Mpire

Ja Rule chronology
Exodus (2005)	The Mirror (2009)	Icon (2012)

Singles from The Mirror
- 1. "Uh-Ohhh!" Released: August 1, 2007; 2. "Body" Released: September 20, 2007

Alternative cover

Professional ratings
Review scores
Source	Rating
Blender	2/5 stars
Entertainment Weekly	B−
XXL	3/5 stars

The Mirror is the second mixtape by rapper Ja Rule, originally planned to be released as his seventh album in 2007. Two singles, "Uh-Ohhh!" and "Body," were released in 2007 to poor chart performance. After tracks from the unreleased album were leaked online, Ja Rule decided to re-record the album, but later decided to release it as a mixtape on July 31, 2009 along with two bonus tracks, "Free" and "Style On 'Em."

== Background ==
Prior to the start of recording for this album, Ja Rule's last original studio album was R.U.L.E. in 2004; The Inc. released a greatest hits compilation, Exodus, in 2005. The Inc. CEO Irv Gotti was accused of laundering money for drug dealer Kenneth McGriff, but in December 2005 a jury found him not guilty. Jayson Rodriguez of MTV News asserted that Gotti's trial and other events, including a rivalry with 50 Cent, prompted Ja Rule "to take a much needed moment to get his thoughts together".

== History ==
The album was originally scheduled for released on September 25, then November 13. "Uh-Ohhh!", featuring Lil Wayne, was the first single off The Mirror. It debuted on July 31, 2007 and peaked at #69 on the Billboard Hot R&B/Hip-Hop Songs chart. Other tracks recorded for the album included various tracks that, according to Jayson Rodriguez of MTV News, reflected on the criminal trial of Irv Gotti: "Hearsay", "Love is Pain", and "Father Forgive Me". "Body", featuring Ashley Joi, premiered in October and reached #71 on the R&B chart.

Ja Rule stated in an interview that there are seventeen tracks and only a few guest appearances because he wanted The Mirror to be about him. In an interview with SOHH, Ja Rule commented on the album:

"The whole industry is so focused on beefin' with each other — it's like the WWE of rap right now. I'm stepping out of the arena. I don't want to be a wrestlin' rapper. Somebody's got to come in and make it positive. You have to make records that make people feel like having a good time. This record is like my confessions, I'm shedding my skins. The Mirror is your only real moment of truth. It's the place where everybody can go and be honest with themselves."

Ja Rule released a free mixtape, Atkins Files Vol. 1, to fans via his MySpace page late in 2008 which contained songs originally slated for The Mirror.

Addressing the leak of tracks from his original version of The Mirror, Ja Rule announced in a 2009 interview with HipHopDX that he would record an entirely new album. Gotti explained to MTV News that the delay of the album was for "trying to craft a classic LP." "Hollywood" dropped in late April; Micaela Hood of the Miami Herald called it "an ode to some of his favorite peeps like Oprah and President Obama". On July 31, 2009, the original version of The Mirror was released online as a mixtape.

== Track listing ==
No.	Title	Producer(s)	Length
1.	"Intro"		1:47
2.	"Skit"		0:06
3.	"Message to Mankind"		2:22
4.	"Uh-Ohhh!!" (featuring Lil Wayne)	Minnesota	3:48
5.	"Body" (featuring Ashley Joi)	7 Aurelius	3:48
6.	"Sunset" (featuring Game & Stefani)	Rick steel	3:56
7.	"300" (featuring Newz, Tre & Merc Montana)		4:57
8.	"Enemy of the State"	Chink Santana	3:53
9.	"Ladies"	Erick Sermon	5:02
10.	"Father Forgive Me"	7 Aurelius	3:29
11.	"Judas"		4:07
12.	"Damn"	Rick Steel	4:36
13.	"The Mirror (Pain is Love)"		4:05
14.	"Something New" (featuring Vita)		4:34
15.	"Rules of Engagement"		2:17
16.	"It's All Hood Now"	Rick Steel	4:39
17.	"Katt Williams (skit)"		0:43
18.	"Hear Say"	Rick Steel	4:11
19.	"Sing a Prayer 4 Me"	Chink Santana	4:22
20.	"Free" (featuring Ashley Joi) (bonus track)		4:01
21.	"Style on 'Em" (bonus track)	Rick Steel	4:29
