= Clap Back =

Single by Ja Rule

from the album Blood in My Eye
- B-side: "The Crown"
- Released: October 14, 2003
- Recorded: 2003
- Genre: East Coast hip-hop · hardcore hip-hop
- Length: 4:56
- Label: Murder Inc.; Def Jam
- Songwriters: Scott Storch, Irving Lorenzo, Jeffery Atkins
- Producers: Scott Storch, Irv Gotti

Ja Rule singles chronology
"Reign" (2003)	"Clap Back" (2003)	"Wonderful" (2004)

"Clap Back" is a song by American rapper Ja Rule, released as the only single from his fifth studio album, Blood in My Eye (2003). It was produced by American producer Scott Storch, who helped write the song along with Ja Rule and Irv Gotti. In the United States, the song was released along with "The Crown" (featuring Sizzla) from Blood in My Eye, and in the UK the song was released alongside "Murder Reigns" (titled "Reigns"), the final single from Ja Rule's previous studio album The Last Temptation (2002).

== Lyrical content ==
The song is a diss track directed at 50 Cent and Eminem, with lines such as "Like Bush and Saddam, I'm-a find out where Em Laden's hiding and bomb him first", "And God gave me his blessings to handle my business, All these wanksta snitches, let the nina blow kisses, If she some how misses, he gon' meet the mistress, And 'Clap that boy' like Birdman and Clipse". Another line, "Fuck the Dog, beware of Rule, 'cause I'm the problem", was also interpreted as being aimed at DMX..

== Legacy ==
The song is the origin of the popular slang 'clap back' in street lingo, meaning to respond or retaliate to personal attack or criticism.

== Video ==
The video features a snippet of "The Crown" in the beginning and then switches to "Clap Back". Benzino, Hussein Fatal and various Murder Inc. artists appear.

== Track listing ==
US CD single

1. "Clap Back" (radio edit) – 4:16
2. "Clap Back" (album version) – 4:57
3. "The Crown" (featuring Sizzla; radio edit) – 3:45
4. "Clap Back" (video) – 5:33

== Charts ==
Chart performance for "Clap Back"
Chart (2003)	Peak position
Australia (ARIA)	43
Austria (Ö3 Austria Top 40)	54
Belgium (Ultratip Bubbling Under Flanders)	5
Belgium (Ultratip Bubbling Under Wallonia)	15
Germany (GfK)	39
Ireland (IRMA)	20
Netherlands (Dutch Top 40 Tipparade)	13
New Zealand (Recorded Music NZ)	47
Scottish Singles Sales (Official Charts) with "Reigns"	15
UK Singles (Official Charts)	9
UK Hip Hop/R&B (Official Charts) with "Reigns"	3
US Billboard Hot 100	44
US Hot R&B/Hip-Hop Songs (Billboard)	17
US Hot Rap Songs (Billboard)	12
US Rhythmic Airplay (Billboard)	25
