= Black Merda =

American soul musical group

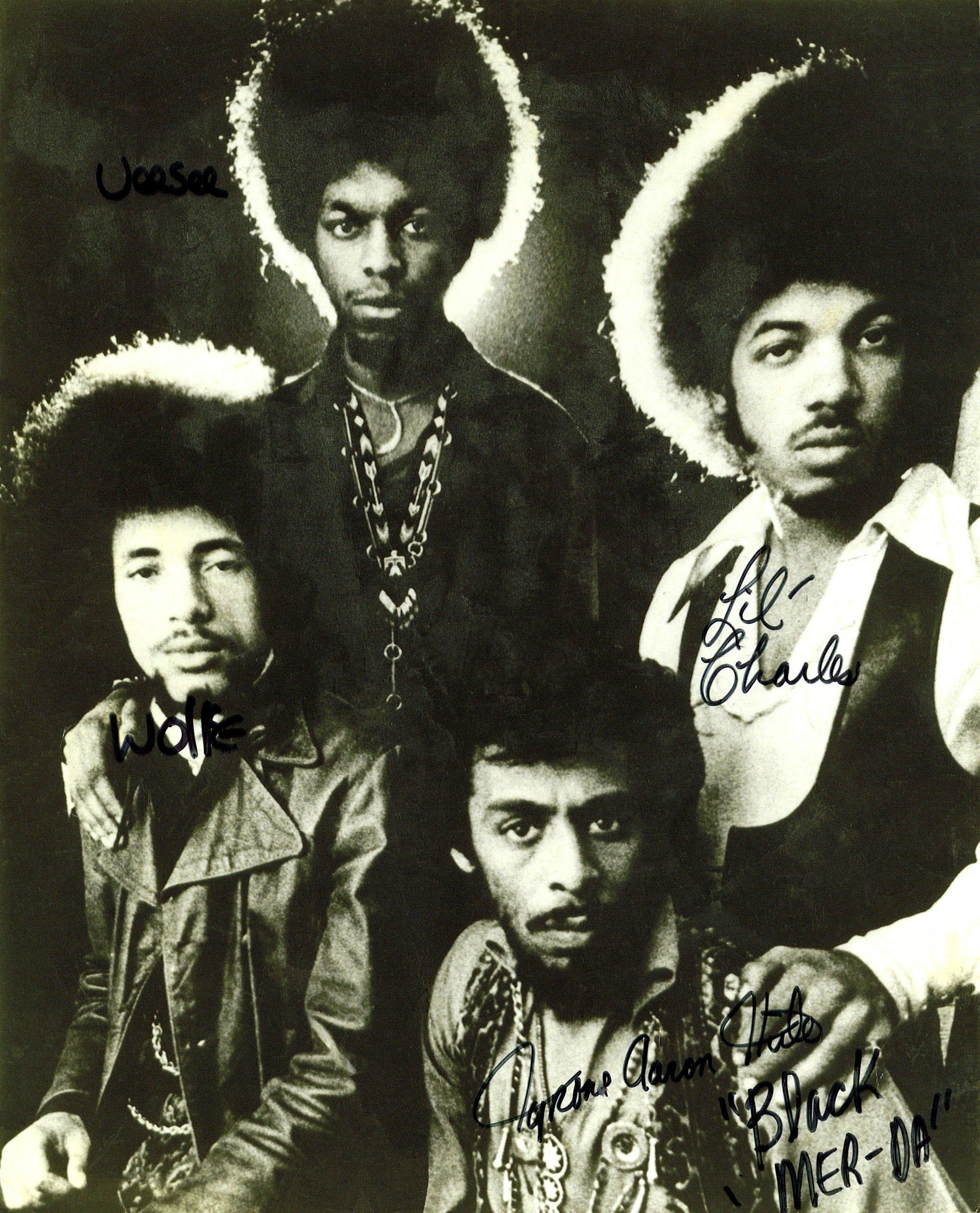
- Black Merda in 1969 (clockwise from left: Anthony Hawkins, VC L. Veasey, Charles Hawkins, Tyrone Hite)

Background information
- Origin: Detroit, Michigan
- Genres: Acid rock; psychedelic soul; funk rock; blues rock
- Years active: 1968–1975, 2005–present
- Members: Anthony Hawkins; VC L. Veasey; Charles Hawkins; Michael Kilgore
- Past members: Tyrone Hite
- Website: www.blackmerda.net

Black Merda (/ˈblæk ˈmɜːrdə/ BLAK MURD-ə) (Note: The name of the band comes from a pronunciation respelling of the words black murder; it is unrelated to Catalan, Galician, Italian and Portuguese merda (from Latin merda, -ae), meaning "shit".) is an American rock band from Detroit, Michigan active from the mid-1960s to the early 1970s and reuniting in 2005. The core band members are guitarist/vocalist Anthony Hawkins, bassist/guitarist/vocalist VC L. Veasey, guitarist/vocalist Charles Hawkins, (current) drummer Michael Kilgore plus (original) drummer/vocalist Tyrone Hite. Hite and Kilgore were natives of Detroit; the Hawkins brothers and Veasey were all born in Lyon, Mississippi and came of age in Detroit.

== History ==
=== Early session and backup work ===
Anthony Hawkins and VC Lamont Veasey (also known as VC L Veasey, Veesee L Veasey, The Mighty V!) met in elementary school. Hawkins and Tyrone Hite met in high school in Detroit in the early 1960s, and all worked as session and backup musicians in the Detroit scene in the following years. Hawkins and Veasey worked frequently as session musicians for companies such as Fortune Records, Golden World Studios, and producer Don Davis, while Hite worked in sessions originally as a singer before taking up the drums. Many singers and musicians would show up at the Hawkins house where most of the rehearsals would take place.

Hawkins, Veasey, and Hite originally performed together as the Impacts, then as the Soul Agents backing up Edwin Starr, Gene Chandler, Wilson Pickett, The Spinners, The Artistics, Billy Butler, The Chi-Lites, Joe Tex, Jackie Wilson, The Temptations, and other soul/R&B acts affiliated with Motown and Brunswick Records. The Impacts were hired as the backing band for the 1965 single "Agent Double-O Soul" by Edwin Starr. Starr took them on as his permanent backing unit and dubbed them the Soul Agents. A horn section consisting of Victor Stubblefield and Gus Hawkins worked with the group periodically during this period. By 1967 the Soul Agents had appeared on the subsequent Starr singles "Twenty Five Miles" and the seminal "War". Hawkins and Veasey (who had been writing songs together since they were 14 years old) also scored as songwriters in 1967 with "I Will Fear No Evil" by Robert Ward (produced by Don Davis), the B-side of his hit "My Love Is Strictly Reserved For You".

Hawkins, Veasey, and Hite (while working with Starr) began to move away from the standard R&B sounds of the period and became heavily influenced by the hard rock sounds of Cream, The Who, and especially Jimi Hendrix. Veasey had first learned of Hendrix from a Seattle newspaper story in 1966 while stationed with the military in Washington State. Veasey introduced Hawkins and Hite to the album Are You Experienced, and the three were inspired to refashion themselves as a rock power trio in the mold of The Jimi Hendrix Experience. Still known as the Soul Agents, in 1967 the trio cut what is believed to be the first cover of a Hendrix song on record, a rendition of "Foxy Lady" that has become a rare collector's item.

During this period, Charles Hawkins (younger brother of Anthony) was added on second guitar to broaden the group’s sound. Another influence on the group's new musical interests was the general shift in the R&B scene toward harder-edged soul and funk with socially conscious lyrics.

=== As Black Merda ===
Now a quartet with the addition of Charles Hawkins, the band continued working with Edwin Starr as the Soul Agents, with Starr approving of the change in sound to guitar-based psychedelic rock and funk. But in 1968 they decided to craft a new identity as a self-contained rock band. After considering the name Murder Incorporated after the notorious criminal organization Murder, Inc., the band settled on Black Murder (suggested by Veasey) as a comment on the rampant inner-city violence experienced by many African Americans during that period. Considering that many young black people were at that time being killed by the police and the Ku Klux Klan in Detroit and in the south, Veasey wanted to choose a name that would be a shocking reminder to the public of how bad the situation was. The spelling was later changed to Black Merda as an African American slang spelling (suggested by Anthony) of the word "murder" while retaining the original theme.

Black Merda continued with Starr for a brief period, as well as backing The Temptations in 1969, but began to view the R&B scene as passé compared to the experimental rock and funk music of Hendrix and other young artists. Regardless, Eddie Kendricks of the Temptations expressed interest in producing Black Merda, and introduced them to like-minded singer Ellington "Fugi" Jordan. They collaborated with Fugi on his psychedelic funk song "Mary Don't Take Me on No Bad Trip", released by the Chess Records subsidiary Cadet (started by Marshall Chess, son of the Chess founders) in 1968, which became a popular single in Detroit, though Black Merda did not receive credit on the record. A full album of songs by Fugi in collaboration with Black Merda was recorded but was not released until 2005, under the title Mary Don't Take Me on No Bad Trip from the TuffCity/Funky Delicacies record label. Fugi also introduced the band to Marshall Chess, who was interested in working with rock and experimental acts. Marshall signed Black Merda on Fugi's recommendation alone.

Black Merda’s debut album was released in 1970, and the band briefly became known as leaders among the burgeoning black rock and heavy funk scene that also included up-and-comers Funkadelic and The Bar-Kays. The album suffered from a lack of promotion due to management changes at Chess Records. Disillusioned, the band moved to California to back Fugi once more, as well as Eric Burdon and War. The band later returned to Detroit, but without Tyrone Hite, who decided to stay in California.

Black Merda began work on their second album without an official drummer, with session drummer Bob Crowder being hired just before recording. The album Long Burn the Fire was released in 1972 by Chess subsidiary Janus Records, with only Veasey and the Hawkins brothers pictured on the sleeve. The band's name was changed to Mer-Da on the front cover of the album in an attempt at greater accessibility. The second album also suffered from poor promotion, and the band members later broke up and returned to more orthodox session work in soul and R&B.

=== Reunion ===
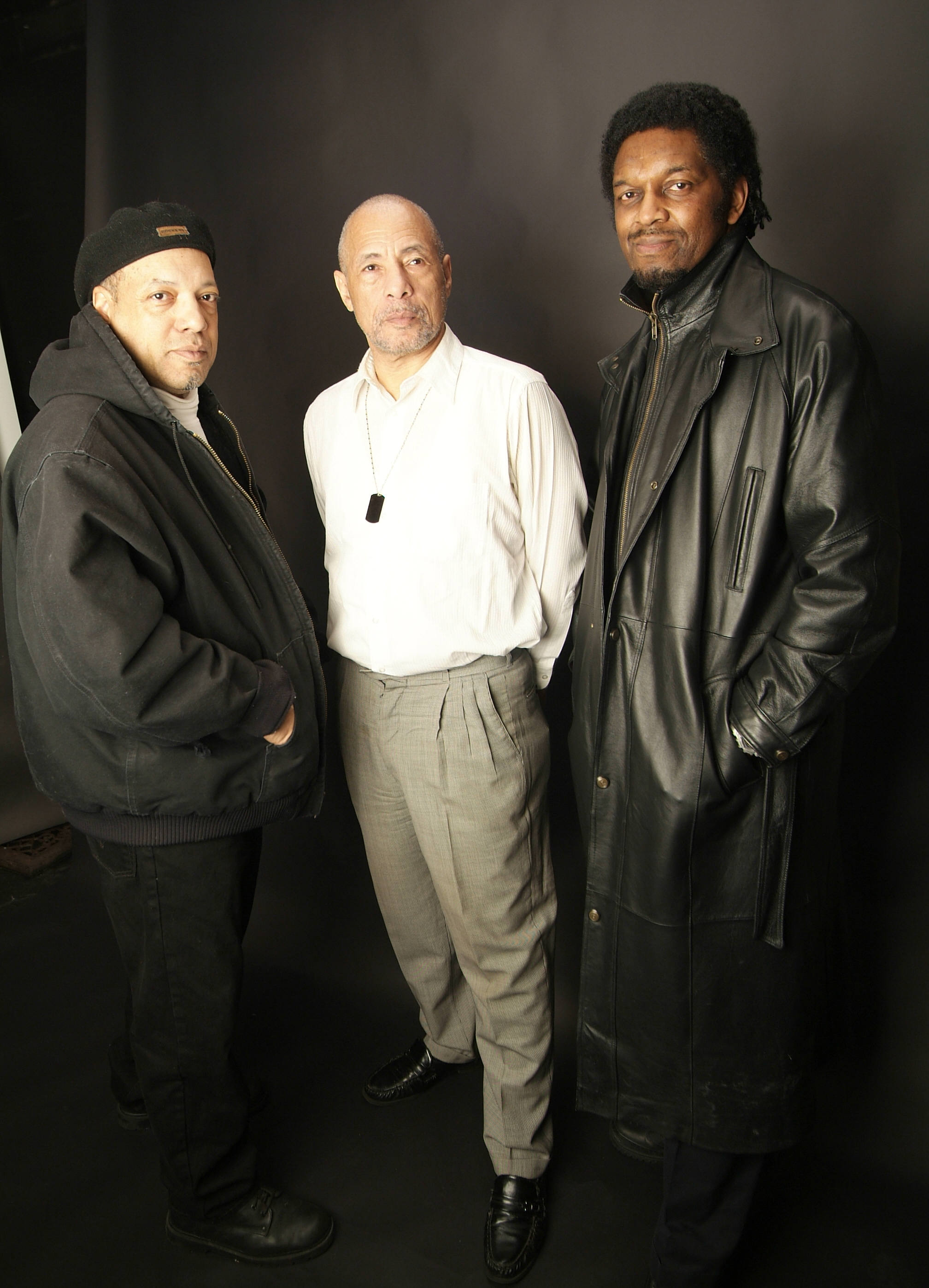
Black Merda in 2008 (L-R Charles Hawkins, Anthony Hawkins, VC L. Veasey)

In 2005, the Funky Delicacies label released the compilation disc The Folks from Mother's Mixer, collecting all the songs from the two original albums, Black Merda and Long Burn the Fire. Thanks to the new attention brought by this compilation and a cult following that showed a growing interest in the obscure black rock of the early 1970s, the Hawkins brothers and Veasey reunited in 2005. (Hite had died in 2004). The reformed Black Merda has played at several festivals in Detroit and the surrounding region as well as New York's Central Park SummerStage concerts series and The Ottawa Blues Festival in 2006.

A compilation of rarities titled The Psych-funk of Black Merda was released in 2006. The band has since released the albums Renaissance (2006) and Force of Nature (2009).

The long-delayed appreciation for Black Merda's influence was further reflected in 2005 when rapper Ja Rule sampled their 1972 track "Lying" as the backing track for "Exodus Intro" on his Exodus album. In 2007 The Detroit Metro Times named the 1970 track "Cynthy-Ruth" as one of The 100 Greatest Detroit Songs Ever! Further recognition was garnered when "Cynthy-Ruth" was featured in the HBO documentary The Nine Lives Of Marion Barry that aired in August 2009. Kanye West sampled "Cynthy-Ruth" for use in the track "Teriya King" on the 2009 album Serious Japanese that he produced for Japanese rappers the Teriyaki Boyz. The band was featured in the Spinner.com article "In Living Color: 20 Important Black Rockers Past and Present" in 2010. "Take A Little Time," the single from the 2009 album Force Of Nature, was featured on the Mojo Magazine compilation Heavy Soul in 2010. Their self-titled 1970 debut album was chosen as one of "Detroit's greatest hits that should have been" by the Detroit Metro Times (November 10, 2010, Music Issue).

== Discography ==
Albums

- Black Merda (Chess, 1970; reissued by Funky Delicacies, 1996, Lillith 2006)
- Long Burn the Fire (Janus, 1972; reissued by Funky Delicacies, 1996)
- The Folks from Mother's Mixer (Funky Delicacies, 2005; compilation)
- Mary Don't Take Me On No Bad Trip – Fugi featuring Black Merda (Funky Delicacies, 2005)
- The Psych-funk of Black Merda (Funky Delicacies, 2006; rarities)
- Renaissance (Black Merda LLC, 2006)
- Force of Nature (Vampi Soul, 2009)

Singles

- "Foxy Lady" – The Soul Agents (precursor to Black Merda, 1968)
- "Mary Don't Take Me On No Bad Trip" – Fuji featuring Black Merda (Cadet, 1969)
- "Cynthy-Ruth/Reality" (Chess 1970)
- "Prophet/Cynthy-Ruth" (Chess 1970)
- "Revelations" – Fuji featuring Black Merda (Cadet, 1970)
- "Red Moon" – Fugi featuring Black Merda (Grand Junction, 1971)
- "Take a Little Time" – (Vampi Soul, 2009)
