= Black Merda (album) =

Studio album by Black Merda
- Released: 1970
- Recorded: Winter 1970 in Chicago
- Genre: Acid rock; psychedelic soul; funk rock; blues rock
- Length: 35:50
- Label: Chess
- Producer: Swan

Black Merda chronology
Black Merda (1970)	Long Burn the Fire (1972)

Alternative cover
- 1996 reissue from TuffCity Records

Professional ratings
Review scores
Source	Rating
Allmusic	3.5/5 stars

Black Merda is the self-titled debut album by the Detroit rock band Black Merda. It was released in 1970 by Chess Records. The original album was long out of print before being reissued on CD by TuffCity Records in 1996. All of the album's tracks are also collected on the 2005 Black Merda compilation The Folks from Mother's Mixer.

== Track listing ==
1. "Prophet" (A. Hawkins, V. Veasey) – 2:52
2. "Think of Me" (A. Hawkins, V. Veasey, C. Hawkins, T. Hite) – 2:31
3. "Cynthy-Ruth" (V. Veasey) – 3:03
4. "Over and Over" (A. Hawkins, V. Veasey, C. Hawkins, T. Hite) – 5:29
5. "Ashamed" (A. Hawkins, V. Veasey) – 3:50
6. "Reality" (V. Veasey) – 1:59
7. "Windsong" (A. Hawkins, V. Veasey, C. Hawkins, T. Hite) – 4:12
8. "Good Luck" (A. Hawkins, V. Veasey) – 3:45
9. "That’s the Way It Goes" (V. Veasey) – 3:15
10. "I Don’t Want to Die" (A. Hawkins, V. Veasey, C. Hawkins, T. Hite) – 3:51
11. "Set Me Free" (A. Hawkins, V. Veasey) – 0:28

== Personnel ==
- Anthony Hawkins – guitar, vocals
- VC L. Veasey – bass guitar, vocals
- Charles Hawkins – guitar, vocals
- Tyrone Hite – drums, vocals
