= Wonderful (Ja Rule song) =

2004 single by Ja Rule

Single by Ja Rule featuring R. Kelly and Ashanti

from the album R.U.L.E. and Concrete Rose
- Released: September 27, 2004
- Studio: C.H. (New York City)
- Length: 4:26
- Label: The INC
- Songwriters: Jeffrey Atkins; Irving Lorenzo; Kendred Smith; Robert Kelly
- Producers: Jimi Kendrix; Irv Gotti

Ja Rule singles chronology
"Clap Back" (2003)	"Wonderful" (2004)	"New York" (2004)

R. Kelly singles chronology
"So Sexy Chapter II (Like This)" (2004)	"Wonderful" (2004)	"U Saved Me" (2004)

Ashanti singles chronology
"Southside" (2004)	"Wonderful" (2004)	"Only U" (2004)

"Wonderful" is a song by American rapper Ja Rule. It was released on September 27, 2004, as the lead single from his sixth studio album, R.U.L.E. (2004), through Irv Gotti's The INC record label. The song features American pop-R&B singers R. Kelly and Ashanti. "Wonderful" topped the UK Singles Chart, reached number five on the US Billboard Hot 100, peaked at number six in both Australia and New Zealand, and became a top-20 hit in Denmark, Germany, Ireland, the Netherlands, and Switzerland.

A remix was made available on Ashanti's fourth studio album, Concrete Rose (2004), featuring an extended verse from the singer and omitting Kelly's verse. A video directed by Hype Williams was made for this single.

== Commercial performance ==
In the United States, "Wonderful" peaked at number five on the Billboard Hot 100 in November 2004, making it Ja Rule's fourth top-five hit on the chart as well as the last top-10 hit for Ja Rule, R. Kelly, and Ashanti as of 2026. The song ended 2005 at number 94 on Billboard's year-end chart and has been certified gold in the US by the Recording Industry Association of America (RIAA). In the United Kingdom, the song topped the UK Singles Chart, making it Ja Rule's first number-one hit in Britain, though it was the country's lowest-selling number-one debut at the time, selling 23,706 copies during its release week.

== Track listings ==
UK CD single

1. "Wonderful" (featuring R. Kelly and Ashanti) – 4:32
2. "Livin' It Up" (featuring Case) – 4:17
3. "Always on Time" (featuring Ashanti) – 4:03

European CD single

1. "Wonderful" (featuring R. Kelly and Ashanti) – 4:32
2. "Caught Up" (featuring Lloyd) – 4:29

Australian maxi-CD single

1. "Wonderful" (featuring R. Kelly and Ashanti) – 4:33
2. "Caught Up" (featuring Lloyd) – 4:29
3. "Wonderful" (instrumental) – 4:33
4. "Always on Time" (featuring Ashanti) – 4:03

== Credits and personnel ==
Credits are taken from the R.U.L.E. album booklet.

Studios

- Recorded at C.H. Studios (New York City)
- Mixed at Circle House Studios (Miami, Florida) and Right Track Studios (New York City)
- Mastered at Sterling Sound (New York City)

Personnel

- Ja Rule – writing (as Jeffrey Atkins)
- Irv Gotti – writing (as Irving Lorenzo), production
- Kendred Smith – writing
- R. Kelly – writing (as Robert Kelly), featured vocals
- Ashanti – featured vocals
- Demetrius "Demi-Doc" McGhee – bass guitar, organ, strings, additional keyboards
- Jimi Kendrix – production
- Milwaukee "Protools King" Buck – recording
- Supa Engineer DURO – mixing
- Terry "T-Mac" Herbert – assistant engineering
- Tom Coyne – mastering

== Charts ==
=== Weekly charts ===
Chart (2004–2005)	Peak position
Australia (ARIA)	6
Australian Urban (ARIA)	1
Austria (Ö3 Austria Top 40)	47
Belgium (Ultratop 50 Flanders)	45
Belgium (Ultratip Bubbling Under Wallonia)	2
Denmark (Tracklisten)	13
Europe (Eurochart Hot 100)	4
Germany (GfK)	20
Ireland (IRMA)	12
Netherlands (Dutch Top 40)	13
Netherlands (Single Top 100)	15
New Zealand (Recorded Music NZ)	6
Romania (Romanian Top 100)	78
Scotland Singles (OCC)	9
Switzerland (Schweizer Hitparade)	12
UK Singles (OCC)	1
UK Hip Hop/R&B (OCC)	1
US Billboard Hot 100	5
US Hot R&B/Hip-Hop Songs (Billboard)	3
US Hot Rap Songs (Billboard)	2
US Pop Airplay (Billboard)	22
US Rhythmic Airplay (Billboard)	6

Chart (2013)	Peak position
UK Hip Hop/R&B (OCC)	38

=== Year-end charts ===
Chart (2004)	Position
UK Singles (OCC)	90
US Hot R&B/Hip-Hop Singles & Tracks (Billboard)	81
US Rhythmic Top 40 (Billboard)	93

Chart (2005)	Position
Australia (ARIA)	42
Australian Urban (ARIA)	19
Switzerland (Schweizer Hitparade)	82
US Billboard Hot 100	94
US Hot R&B/Hip-Hop Songs (Billboard)	39
US Mainstream Top 40 (Billboard)	89
US Rhythmic Top 40 (Billboard)	49

== Certifications ==
Region	Certification	Certified units/sales
Brazil (Pro-Música Brasil)	2× Platinum	120,000^{‡}
United Kingdom (BPI)	Silver	200,000^{‡}
United States (RIAA)	Gold	500,000^{*}
^{*} Sales figures based on certification alone.^{‡} Sales+streaming figures based on certification alone.

== Release history ==
Region	Date	Format(s)	Label(s)	Ref.
United States	September 27, 2004	Rhythmic contemporary; urban radio	The Inc.	
United States	October 25, 2004	Contemporary hit radio	The Inc.	
United Kingdom	October 25, 2004	CD	The Inc.	
