= Long Burn the Fire =

Studio album by Black Merda
- Released: 1972
- Genre: Acid rock; psychedelic soul; funk rock; blues rock
- Length: 34:17
- Label: Janus Records

Black Merda chronology
Black Merda (1970)	Long Burn the Fire (1972)	The Folks from Mother's Mixer (2005)

Professional ratings
Review scores
Source	Rating
AllMusic	2/5 stars
Christgau's Record Guide	B+

Long Burn the Fire is the second studio album by the Detroit rock band, Black Merda. The band’s name was altered to Mer-Da on the album’s front cover. It was released by Chess Records subsidiary Janus in 1972. The album sleeve features only guitarists Anthony and Charles Hawkins, and bassist VC L. Veasey. Original drummer Tyrone Hite had left the band and was not officially replaced. Later, session drummer Bob Crowder was hired just before the recording sessions. The original album was long out of print before being reissued on CD by TuffCity Records in 1996. All of the album’s tracks are also collected on the 2005 Black Merda compilation The Folks from Mother's Mixer.

== Critical reception ==
Reviewing in Christgau's Record Guide: Rock Albums of the Seventies (1981), Robert Christgau regarded Long Burn the Fire as a "follow-up" to the 1971 Sly and the Family Stone album There's a Riot Goin' On and went on to say:

"No more riots here than with Sly, or course [sic]—just self-hate, misogyny, desperate poverty, and senseless violence, as out-of-tune voices declaim strangely catchy tunes over loitering funk patterns and jagged guitar. 'Sometimes I wish I'd never been born,' they announce flatly, and they can really get flat. But the most surreal passage comes toward the close of 'My Mistake,' when 'I should have killed her instead' (author's note: of the friend he caught having sex with her), horrifying enough as a surprise endline, is transformed into a little piece of art-funk, repeated amid various instrumental configurations by an off-key chorale that sounds positively transported."

== Track listing ==
1. "For You" – 4:38
2. "The Folks from Mother’s Mixer" – 4:09
3. "My Mistake" – 5:25
4. "Lying" – 4:25
5. "Long Burn the Fire" – 3:21
6. "Sometimes I Wish" – 3:45
7. "I Got a Woman" – 4:53
8. "We Made Up" – 3:41

== Personnel ==
- Anthony Hawkins – acoustic guitar, piano, tambourine, lead and backing vocals
- VC L. Veasey – bass, acoustic guitar, lead and backing vocals
- Charles Hawkins – electric guitar, lead and backing vocals
- Bob Crowder – drums
- Blake Brown – maracas
- Laurenz Pakter – backing vocals
