= Body (Ja Rule song) =

Single by Ja Rule featuring Ashley Joi

from the album The Mirror
- Released: September 20, 2007
- Recorded: 2007
- Genre: Dirty rap; pop rap; R&B
- Label: The Inc.; Universal Motown
- Songwriters: Jeffrey Atkins, Irving Lorenzo, 7 Aurelius
- Producers: Irv Gotti, 7 Aurelius

Ja Rule singles chronology
"Uh-Ohhh!" (2007)	"Body" (2007)	"Fly" (2009)

"Body" is a 2007 single by American rapper Ja Rule. It features Ashley Joi and was produced by 7 Aurelius. The music video for the song was directed by Hype Williams and it premiered on BET's Access Granted on September 20, 2007.

"Body" is a track on the Ja Rule album The Mirror, which was intended for release in 2007 but was shelved, then eventually released online for free in 2009.

== Conception ==
Ja Rule initially wrote the song in a club, as he saw some women dance. In an interview with BET, Ja Rule said that it was too explicit to describe the process of writing the lyrics of the song. According to Ja Rule, he was having sex with a groupie when he thought of the chorus.

== Charts ==
Chart (2007–2008)	Peak position
Romania (Romanian Top 100)	79
US Hot R&B/Hip-Hop Songs (Billboard)	71
