= Uh-Ohhh! =

Single by Ja Rule featuring Lil Wayne

from the album The Mirror
- Released: June 11, 2007
- Recorded: 2007
- Genre: East Coast hip hop
- Length: 3:47
- Label: The Inc.; Universal Motown
- Songwriters: Jeffrey Atkins, Dwayne Michael Carter
- Producer: Minnesota

Ja Rule singles chronology
"Caught Up" (2005)	"Uh-Ohhh!" (2007)	"Body" (2007)

Lil Wayne singles chronology
"Duffle Bag Boy" (2007)	"Uh-Ohhh!" (2007)	"Pop Bottles" (2007)

"Uh-Ohhh!!" is a song by American rapper Ja Rule, released as the first single from his first mixtape The Mirror (2007). It features a guest appearance from fellow rapper Lil Wayne.

== Background ==
The song features a guest appearance from Lil Wayne and was officially released August 1, 2007. The song was released on iTunes August 7, 2007. An alternate version of the song featuring The Inc. Records artist Young Merc and a longer verse from Wayne leaked online. This version omits Ja Rule's second verse.

== Track listing ==
=== Promo CD ===
1. "Uh-Ohhh!" (featuring Lil Wayne) (Radio Rip) - 3:49
2. "Uh-Ohhh!" (featuring Lil Wayne) (Album Version) - 3:47
3. "Uh-Ohhh!" (Instrumental)

== Charts ==
Chart (2007)	Peak position
US Hot R&B/Hip-Hop Songs (Billboard)	69
