= Mesmerize (song) =

2002 single by Ja Rule

Single by Ja Rule featuring Ashanti

from the album The Last Temptation
- B-side: "Pop Niggas"
- Released: December 16, 2002
- Studio: The Hit Factory Criteria (Miami, Florida)
- Length: 4:38
- Label: Def Jam; Murder Inc.
- Songwriters: Jeffrey Atkins; Ashanti Douglas; Andre Parker; Irving Lorenzo; Thomas Bell; Linda Creed
- Producers: Irv Gotti; Chink Santana

Ja Rule singles chronology
"Thug Lovin'" (2002)	"Mesmerize" (2002)	"Reign" (2003)

Ashanti singles chronology
"Baby" (2002)	"Mesmerize" (2002)	"Rock wit U (Awww Baby)" (2003)

Music video
- "Mesmerize" on YouTube

"Mesmerize" is a song by American rapper Ja Rule. It was released on December 16, 2002, as the second single from his fourth studio, album The Last Temptation (2002). Containing a sample from the 1974 song "Stop, Look, Listen (To Your Heart)" by Diana Ross and Marvin Gaye, the song was produced by Irv Gotti and features R&B artist Ashanti. The song peaked at number two on the Billboard Hot 100 in February 2003, making it Ashanti's and Ja Rule's fourth top-10 hit as a duet.

== Music video ==
Inspired by the musical number "You're the One that I Want" from the 1978 musical film Grease, the music video begins with Irv Gotti a group of men dressed in black discussing their connections in Los Angeles, California and Houston, Texas (a reference to Murder Inc.'s affiliation with Death Row Records and Rap-A-Lot Records) and their plan for a revolution in a strategy room. Ja Rule enters dressed in a preppy sweater, greatly surprising the other men, and explains that his girl wants him to forsake the street life. Meanwhile, some of Ashanti's friends are having a slumber party (with the Ashanti album cut "Movies" playing in the background) and playing Scrabble when Ashanti emerges dressed in flashy black leather attire, explaining that her guy wants her to be more street.

The song begins with the two meeting up at an amusement fair. As they sing, they partake in various carnival attractions, such as game booths and bumper cars. The song ends abruptly with Ja Rule's friends emerging from a black van and asking him if he's riding with them. After he hesitates and turns to Ashanti, she accepts. They enter the van and after a few quick cuts they emerge and Ja Rule begins rapping "Destiny", the closing track from the album. The video ends with a crowd of men marching the streets and holding up various signs, including tributes to late rappers Tupac Shakur and DJ Jam-Master Jay.

The street scene was filmed outside Cathedral High School on Bishops Road (formerly Stadium Way), an up-hill climb towards Dodger Stadium. The carnival scenes were filmed in Los Angeles at Cathedral High School's graveyard field. The entire campus was the site of the old Calvary Cemetery, northeast of downtown Los Angeles.

== Track listings ==
US 12-inch single

A1. "Mesmerize" (radio)
A2. "Mesmerize" (street)
A3. "Mesmerize" (instrumental)
B1. "Pop N****s" (radio)
B2. "Pop N****s" (street)
B3. "Pop N****s" (instrumental)

Australian CD1

1. "Mesmerize" (radio edit)
2. "Mesmerize" (album version)
3. "Pop Niggas" (album version)
4. "Mesmerize" (video)

Australian CD2 and European CD single

1. "Mesmerize" (radio edit)
2. "Pop Niggas" (album version)

UK CD single

1. "Mesmerize" – 4:38
2. "Between Me and You" (featuring Christina Milian) – 4:10
3. "Mesmerize" (instrumental) – 4:38
4. "Mesmerize" (video) – 3:44

UK 12-inch single

A1. "Mesmerize" – 4:38
A2. "Pop N****s" – 4:29
B1. "Mesmerize" (instrumental) – 4:38

UK cassette single

1. "Mesmerize" – 4:38
2. "Between Me and You" (featuring Christina Milian) – 4:10
3. "Mesmerize" (instrumental) – 4:38

== Charts ==
=== Weekly charts ===
Chart (2002–2003)	Peak position
Australia (ARIA)	5
Australian Urban (ARIA)	3
Belgium (Ultratip Bubbling Under Flanders)	8
Belgium (Ultratip Bubbling Under Wallonia)	6
Canada (Nielsen SoundScan)	19
Canada CHR (Nielsen BDS)	11
Europe (Eurochart Hot 100)	45
France (SNEP)	66
Germany (GfK)	71
Ireland (IRMA)	19
Netherlands (Dutch Top 40)	38
Netherlands (Single Top 100)	33
New Zealand (Recorded Music NZ)	3
Scottish Singles Sales (Official Charts)	18
Switzerland (Schweizer Hitparade)	79
UK Singles (Official Charts)	12
UK Hip Hop/R&B (Official Charts)	6
US Billboard Hot 100	2
US Dance Singles Sales (Billboard)	19
US Hot R&B/Hip-Hop Songs (Billboard)	5
US Hot Rap Songs (Billboard)	2
US Pop Airplay (Billboard)	3
US Rhythmic Airplay (Billboard)	2

=== Year-end charts ===
Chart (2003)	Position
Australia (ARIA)	35
Australian Urban (ARIA)	20
New Zealand (RIANZ)	40
UK Singles (OCC)	123
US Billboard Hot 100	25
US Hot R&B/Hip-Hop Singles & Tracks (Billboard)	49
US Hot Rap Tracks (Billboard)	8
US Mainstream Top 40 (Billboard)	24
US Rhythmic Top 40 (Billboard)	18

== Certifications ==
Region	Certification	Certified units/sales
Australia (ARIA)	Platinum	70,000^{^}
Brazil (Pro-Música Brasil)	Gold	30,000^{‡}
New Zealand (RMNZ)	2× Platinum	60,000^{‡}
United Kingdom (BPI)	Gold	400,000^{‡}
^{^} Shipments figures based on certification alone.^{‡} Sales+streaming figures based on certification alone.

== Release history ==
Region	Date	Format(s)	Label(s)	Ref.
United States	December 16, 2002	Rhythmic contemporary; urban radio	Murder Inc.; Def Jam	
United States	January 27, 2003	Contemporary hit radio	Murder Inc.; Def Jam	
Australia	March 10, 2003	CD1	Murder Inc.	
Australia	March 17, 2003	CD2	Murder Inc.	
United Kingdom	March 17, 2003	12-inch vinyl; CD; cassette	Murder Inc.; Def Jam	
