= Caught Up (Ja Rule song) =

Single by Ja Rule featuring Lloyd

from the album R.U.L.E.
- Released: May 24, 2005
- Recorded: 2004
- Genre: Hip hop, R&B
- Length: 4:29
- Label: The Inc.; Def Jam
- Songwriters: Jeffrey Atkins, Bryan M Boogz Attmore, Irving Lorenzo, Kendred Smith (Jimi Kendrix)
- Producers: Jimi Kendrix, Irv Gotti, Boogz BG

Ja Rule singles chronology
"New York" (2004)	"Caught Up" (2005)	"Uh-Ohhh!" (2007)

"Caught Up" is the third single by American rapper Ja Rule featuring Lloyd, from his sixth studio album R.U.L.E. and was released on May 25, 2005 by The Inc. Records and Def Jam Recordings. The song featured additional vocals by Alexi Panos.

== Charts ==
Chart (2005)	Peak Position
Australia (ARIA)	34
Australian Urban (ARIA)	11
Ireland (IRMA)	20
Netherlands (Dutch Top 40 Tipparade)	13
Netherlands (Single Top 100)	80
Scotland Singles (OCC)	32
UK Singles (OCC)	20
UK Hip Hop/R&B (OCC)	7
US Hot R&B/Hip-Hop Songs (Billboard)	65

== Release history ==
Region	Date	Format(s)	Label	Ref.
United States	February 22, 2005	Contemporary hit radio; rhythmic contemporary radio; urban contemporary radio	Murder Inc., IDJMG	
