= R.U.L.E. =

Studio album by Ja Rule
- Released: November 9, 2004
- Recorded: 2003–04
- Genre: Hip hop
- Length: 71:30
- Label: The Inc.; Def Jam; Island Def Jam
- Producer: Irv Gotti (also exec.); Ja Rule (also exec.); Cool & Dre; Chink Santana; Jimi Kendrix

Ja Rule chronology
Blood in My Eye (2003)	R.U.L.E. (2004)	Exodus (2005)

Singles from R.U.L.E.
- 1. "Wonderful" Released: September 27, 2004; 2. "New York" Released: October 27, 2004; 3. "Caught Up" Released: May 24, 2005

R.U.L.E. is the sixth studio album by American rapper Ja Rule; it was released on November 9, 2004, by The Inc., Island Def Jam Music Group and Def Jam. The album debuted at number seven on the U.S. Billboard 200 chart, selling 165,000 units in its opening week. The album was certified Gold and sold over 658,000 copies in the United States. Singles from the album include "Wonderful" featuring R. Kelly and Ashanti; the top 20 song "New York" featuring Jadakiss and Fat Joe, and the song "Caught Up" featuring Lloyd.

The album was also made in a heavily edited version removing profanities, drugs and violent content: it removes the skits "Weed" and "Stripping Game". This version of the album became the most edited album other than his previous album Blood in My Eye (2003).

== Critical reception ==
Professional ratings
Review scores
Source	Rating
AllMusic	2.5/5 stars
Entertainment Weekly	C+
HipHopDX	4/5 stars
RapReviews	7/10
USA Today	3/4 stars

R.U.L.E. garnered favorable reviews from music critics but some questioned if this was a return to form after the disappointing Blood in My Eye. K.B. Tindal of HipHopDX called the album Ja's best since Rule 3:36 and Pain Is Love, concluding that "The Inc. will always be Murder Inc. no matter what and Ja will always be at the head of the fam so get used to it, he's back." Steve 'Flash' Juon of RapReviews gave a mixed review, stating "[T]his is not an overwhelming strong album lyrically, but it's a pleasant enough one to listen to musically - and from Ja Rule that's enough to get by." Timothy Gunatilaka of Entertainment Weekly found love ballads like "Passion" and "Wonderful" suitable for Ja Rule, concluding that they "suggest he might want to stick to raspy romanticism." AllMusic editor Jason Birchmeier said that the album continued the depletion of Ja's relevance in hip-hop, stating, "And so the downfall goes—tragic, indeed, or not, depending on how affecting you find the pathos at work." Nathan Rabin of The A.V. Club found Ja's reliance on emulating "2Pac's tortured-thug persona" to craft mildly amusing "overwrought melodrama" overlong throughout the record and exacerbated further through "anonymous production, irritating skits, and [the kind of] raspy shower-stall warbling."

== Track listing ==
Credits adapted from the album's liner notes.

No.	Title	Writer(s)	Producer(s)	Length
1.	"The Inc. Intro"	Jeffrey Atkins	Ja Rule	2:20
2.	"Last of The Mohicans" (featuring Black Child)	Atkins; Ramel Gill; Andre Parker; Irving Lorenzo	Chink Santana; Irv Gotti	4:24
3.	"Wonderful" (featuring R. Kelly & Ashanti)	Atkins; Lorenzo; Kendred Smith; Robert Kelly	Jimi Kendrix; Irv Gotti	4:31
4.	"What's My Name" (featuring Ashanti)	Atkins; Smith; Lorenzo; Bob James	Jimi Kendrix; Irv Gotti	4:26
5.	"New York" (featuring Fat Joe & Jadakiss)	Atkins; Joseph Cartagena; Jason Phillips; Andre Lyon; Marcello Valenzano; Lorenzo; Lawrence Parker	Cool & Dre; Irv Gotti^{[a]}	4:18
6.	"Stripping Game" (skit)			1:15
7.	"The Manual"	Atkins; Smith; Lorenzo	Jimi Kendrix; Irv Gotti; Francion Corbett^{[a]}	4:18
8.	"Get It Started" (featuring Claudette Ortiz)	Atkins; Smith; Lorenzo	Jimi Kendrix; Irv Gotti	4:00
9.	"R.U.L.E."	Atkins; Smith; Lorenzo; Phalon Alexander; Brandon Casey; Brian Casey	Jimi Kendrix; Irv Gotti	3:37
10.	"True Story" (skit)	Richard Wilson	Dat Nigga Reb	0:30
11.	"Caught Up" (featuring Lloyd)	Atkins; Smith; Lorenzo; Bryan Attmore	Jimi Kendrix; Irv Gotti; Boogz^{[a]}	4:29
12.	"Gun Talk" (featuring Black Child)	Atkins; Gill; A. Parker; Lorenzo	Chink Santana; Irv Gotti	4:30
13.	"Never Thought"	Atkins; Smith; Lorenzo	Jimi Kendrix; Irv Gotti	4:42
14.	"Life Goes On" (featuring Trick Daddy & Chink Santana)	Atkins; A. Parker; Maurice Young; Lorenzo	Chink Santana; Irv Gotti	4:52
15.	"Weed" (skit)	Wilson; Artie Green	Dat Nigga Reb; Milwaukee Buck; Artie Green	1:55
16.	"Where I'm From" (featuring Lloyd)	Atkins; Lloyd Polite; A. Parker; Green; Demetrius McGhee; Lorenzo	Chink Santana; Demi-Doc; Artie Green; Irv Gotti	5:11
17.	"Bout My Business" (featuring Caddillac Tah, Black Child & Young Merc)	Atkins; Raymond Grant; Richard Grant; Lorenzo; Taheem Crocker; Gill; Jeffery Crocker; Simon Haseley	DJ Twinz; Irv Gotti^{[a]}	3:39
18.	"Passion"	Atkins; Smith; Lorenzo	Jimi Kendrix; Irv Gotti; Boogz^{[a]}	8:37

Japan bonus track
No.	Title	Producer(s)	Length
19.	"Better Days"	Jimi Kendrix	4:37

Notes

- ^{^[a]} signifies a co-producer.
- "Stripping Game (skit)" and "Weed (skit)" were removed from the edited version of the album.

Sample credits

- "What's My Name" contains samples from the "Farandole", written and performed by Bob James.
- "New York" contains interpolations from "100 Guns", written by Lawrence Parker.
- "Stripping Game (skit)" contains dialogue from the motion picture The Players Club.
- "R.U.L.E" contains interpolations from "They Ain't JE", written by Phalon Alexander, Brandon Casey, and Brian Casey.
- "Bout My Business" contains a sample of "Hogan's Thing", written and performed by Simon Haseley.

== Personnel ==
- Ja Rule – executive producer
- Won "Engineer to the Stars" Bee Allen – engineer (1, 4, 6, 8–10, 15, 17)
- Milwaukee "Protools King" Buck – engineer (2–5, 7–9, 11–14, 16, 18), mixing (1, 6, 10, 15)
- James "J Mellow" Clark – keyboard and bass guitar (17)
- Francion Corbett – additional programming (7)
- Tom Coyne – mastering
- Supa Engineer DURO – mixing (2–4, 7, 12–14, 18)
- Irv Gotti – executive producer
- Terry "T-Mac" Herbert – assistant engineer (2–4, 7–9, 11–14, 16, 18), assistant mix engineer (1, 6, 10, 15), additional vocals (1)
- Gavin "YG" Johnston – assistant engineer (1, 4, 6, 8–10, 17)
- James Johnston – guitars (7)
- Demetrius "Demi-Doc" McGhee – bass guitar (3, 7, 16), keyboards (13, 16), organ (3), strings (3), additional keyboards (3, 7, 11, 18), additional bass guitar (18), additional strings (18)
- Giselle Moya – additional vocals (13)
- Alexi Panos – additional vocals (11)
- Mimi "Audia" Parker – assistant mix engineer (8)
- Shawn Smith – guitars (13)
- Brian Springer – mixing (5, 8, 9, 11, 16, 17)

== Charts ==
=== Weekly charts ===
Chart (2004–05)	Peak position
Australian Urban Albums (ARIA)	10
Canadian Albums (Nielsen SoundScan)	34
Canadian R&B Albums (Nielsen SoundScan)	8
French Albums (SNEP)	116
German Albums (Offizielle Top 100)	44
Irish Albums (IRMA)	67
Japanese Albums (Oricon)	46
Scottish Albums (OCC)	56
Swiss Albums (Schweizer Hitparade)	50
UK Albums (OCC)	33
US Billboard 200	7
US Top R&B/Hip-Hop Albums (Billboard)	3
US Top Rap Albums (Billboard)	3

=== Year-end charts ===
Chart (2005)	Position
US Billboard 200	150
US Top R&B/Hip-Hop Albums (Billboard)	46

== Certifications ==
Region	Certification	Certified units/sales
United Kingdom (BPI)	Silver	60,000^{^}
United States (RIAA)	Gold	500,000^{^}
^{^} Shipments figures based on certification alone.
