= New York (Ja Rule song) =

Single by Ja Rule featuring Fat Joe and Jadakiss

from the album R.U.L.E.
- Released: October 27, 2004
- Recorded: 2004
- Genre: East Coast hip hop; gangsta rap
- Length: 4:18
- Label: The Inc.; Def Jam
- Songwriters: Jeffrey Atkins; Joseph Cartagena; Andre Lyon; Marcello Valenzano; Lawrence Parker; Jason Phillips; Irving Lorenzo
- Producers: Cool & Dre, Irv Gotti

Ja Rule singles chronology
"Wonderful" (2004)	"New York" (2004)	"Caught Up" (2005)

Fat Joe singles chronology
"Lean Back" (2004)	"New York" (2004)	"Hold You Down" (2005)

Jadakiss singles chronology
"U Make Me Wanna" (2004)	"New York" (2004)	"By My Side" (2008)

"New York" is a song by American hip hop recording artist Ja Rule, released on October 27, 2004 as the second single from his sixth studio album R.U.L.E. (2004). The track, produced by Cool & Dre, features fellow New York rappers Fat Joe and Jadakiss. The song's chorus is based on Boogie Down Productions' 1990 song, "100 Guns".

The music video was directed in New York City, and features cameo appearances by many local artists. The song peaked at number 27 on the US Billboard Hot 100 chart, number 14 on US Hot R&B/Hip-Hop Songs, and number 10 on Hot Rap Songs charts respectively.

== Music video ==
The music video for "New York", directed by Juan Carlos, premiered via MTV Jams on November 15, 2004. The music video features cameo appearances from Grafh, Jim Jones, Remy Ma, Cool & Dre, Ed Lover, DJ Clue?, Black Child, Caddillac Tah, Chris Gotti, John "BJ" Bryant, Irv Gotti, Fat Joe's brother Angel, Armageddon, Pistol Pete & Macho, Tony Sunshine, Darrin "Dee" and Joaquin "Waah" Dean, Drag-On, Infrared & Sean Cross, The LOX, Swizz Beatz, Angie Martinez, Havoc, N.O.R.E., Red Cafe, J. Prince, J. Hood, DJ Enuff, and Kool DJ Red Alert. The music video also features murals of rappers Big L, Big Pun, and DJ Jam Master Jay.

== Background ==
Cool & Dre produced the track for rapper Fat Joe, who initially turned it down. Jadakiss was said to be interested in the track; however, Ja Rule grabbed it almost immediately. When Irv Gotti learned of the history behind who was to have the track, he mentioned it to Ja Rule, and then they offered for both Fat Joe and Jadakiss to be featured on the track.

The song contains a sample of Nkalakatha by South African Kwaito sensation, Mandoza. Though not credited, it contains identical slowed down elements of the song produced by Gabi Le Roux.

Ja Rule's verse is a subliminal diss aimed at rival 50 Cent and his group G-Unit. In the song Ja Rule raps: "Y'all niggas is pussy, punani, vagina, your monologue's gettin' tired now it's time to ride, Apprentice, you're fired, you're no longer desired, so take off them silly chains, put back on your wire, I'm On Fire". 50 Cent responded the next year with his 2005 song "Piggy Bank" where he also dissed Fat Joe and Jadakiss for featuring on this song.

There is a sequel/remix to this song which is also titled "New York" on DJ Khaled's 2007 album, We the Best and another version by Cuban Link.

== Charts ==
=== Weekly charts ===
Chart (2004–05)	Peak position
US Billboard Hot 100	27
US Hot R&B/Hip-Hop Songs (Billboard)	14
US Hot Rap Songs (Billboard)	10
US Rhythmic Airplay (Billboard)	17

=== Year-end charts ===
Chart (2005)	Position
US Hot R&B/Hip-Hop Songs (Billboard)	84
