= The Last Temptation (Ja Rule album) =

Studio album by Ja Rule
- Released: November 19, 2002
- Recorded: 2002
- Studios: Hit Factory Criteria (Miami), The Crackhouse (New York City, New York)
- Genre: Hardcore hip-hop
- Length: 54:46
- Labels: Murder Inc.; Def Jam; Island Def Jam
- Producers: Irv Gotti (also exec.); Ja Rule (also exec.); 7 Aurelius; Chink Santana; The Neptunes; Cool & Dre

Ja Rule chronology
Pain Is Love (2001)	The Last Temptation (2002)	Blood in My Eye (2003)

Singles from The Last Temptation
- 1. "Thug Lovin'" Released: November 4, 2002; 2. "Mesmerize" Released: December 16, 2002; 3. "Reign" Released: June 30, 2003

Professional ratings
Aggregate scores
Source	Rating
Metacritic	57/100
Review scores
Source	Rating
AllMusic	4/5 stars
Blender	2/5 stars
E!	B
The Guardian	4/5 stars
RapReviews	6/10
NME	6/10
Q	3/5 stars
Uncut	4/10

The Last Temptation is the fourth studio album by American rapper Ja Rule. It was released by Murder Inc., Def Jam and Island Def Jam Music Group on November 19, 2002.

The album was successful, moving 237,000 units in its first week, but less than his previous Pain Is Love. On December 13, 2002 the album was certified Platinum. "Mesmerize" is ranked at #45 on Blender's list of the "50 Worst Songs Ever", but was the most successful single from the album, reaching number 2 on the US Billboard Hot 100 and number 12 on the UK Singles Chart. The album also received criticism from fans, saying that the album sounded too commercial, and that Ja Rule was selling out. Though neither its debut nor lifetime sales ever matched those of Pain Is Love, The Last Temptation is Ja Rule's third highest-selling album to date.

== Background ==
Originally scheduled for a Autumn 2002 release (as found in the booklet for Pain Is Love), the album was delayed to 2003 (as found in the booklet for Irv Gotti Presents: The Inc.), but was ultimately released on November 19, 2002.

This album contained singles such as "Thug Lovin'" (featuring Bobby Brown), "Mesmerize" (featuring Ashanti) and "The Pledge (Remix)" (by Ashanti featuring Nas, Ja Rule and 2Pac). "Murder Reigns" was also released as a single titled "Reign" in select territories outside of North America, such as Europe and Australasia. The song "Pop Niggas" gained some attention after it was reported to be talking in part about 50 Cent. Pharrell was featured on the song, but not credited. Other guests featured on the album include: Alexi, Charli Baltimore, Caddillac Tah, Celeste, Eastwood, Crooked I, Young Life, and Chink Santana.

== Track listing ==
The Last Temptation track listing
No.	Title	Writer(s)	Producer(s)	Length
1.	"Intro"			0:20
2.	"Thug Lovin'" (featuring Bobby Brown)	Jeffrey Atkins; Andre Parker; Irving Lorenzo; Stevie Wonder	Chink Santana; Irv Gotti	4:50
3.	"Mesmerize" (featuring Ashanti)	Atkins; Ashanti Douglas; Parker; Lorenzo; Thom Bell; Linda Creed	Chink Santana; Irv Gotti	4:38
4.	"Pop Niggas"	Atkins; Pharrell Williams	The Neptunes	4:29
5.	"The Pledge (Remix)" (featuring Ashanti, Nas & 2Pac)	Seven Aurelius; Lorenzo; Douglas; Atkins; Nasir Jones; Eric Baker; Gregory Jacobs; Tupac Shakur; Wonder	7 Aurelius; Irv Gotti	3:54
6.	"Murder Reigns" (featuring Celeste)	Atkins; Aurelius; Lorenzo; David Paich; Jeff Porcaro	7 Aurelius; Irv Gotti	4:03
7.	"Last Temptation" (featuring Charli Baltimore)	Atkins; Parker; Lorenzo; Tiffany Lane; Kenton Nix	Chink Santana; Irv Gotti	4:58
8.	"Murder Me" (featuring Caddillac Tah & Alexi)	Atkins; Parker; Lorenzo; Taheem Crocker; Raphael Saadiq; Carl Wheeler	Chink Santana; Irv Gotti	5:15
9.	"The Warning"	Atkins; Parker; Lorenzo	Chink Santana; Irv Gotti	5:05
10.	"Connected" (featuring Eastwood & Crooked I)	Atkins; Parker; Lorenzo; Deshaun Woodard; Dominic Wickliffe	Chink Santana; Irv Gotti	4:54
11.	"Emerica" (featuring Young Life & Chink Santana)	Atkins; Parker; Rahmane Donovan; Lorenzo	Chink Santana; Irv Gotti	5:16
12.	"Rock Star"	Atkins; Parker; Lorenzo; Lenny Kravitz	Chink Santana; Irv Gotti	4:58
13.	"Destiny (Outro)"	Atkins; Marcello Valenzano; Andre Lyon; Gene Beene; Melvin Griffin	Cool & Dre	2:05

== Leftover tracks ==
- "Streets Raised Me" feat. Mary J. Blige
- "Fuck With Us" feat. Black Child, Caddillac Tah, D.O. Cannons and Young Merc

Sample credits

- "Thug Lovin'" – Interpolates portions of "Knocks Me Off My Feet" performed by Stevie Wonder
- "Mesmerize" – Interpolates portions of "Stop, Look, Listen (To Your Heart)" performed by Diana Ross and Marvin Gaye
- "The Pledge (Remix)" – Contains a sample and elements of "So Many Tears" performed by 2Pac
- "Murder Reigns" – Contains a sample of "Africa" performed by Toto
- "Last Temptation" – Contains a sample of "Funky Sensation" performed by Gwen McCrae
- "Murder Me" – Contains a sample of "Anniversary" performed by Tony! Toni! Toné!
- "Rock Star" – Contains a sample of "I Belong to You" performed by Lenny Kravitz
- "Destiny (Outro)" – Contains a sample of "Midnight Sunshine" performed by The Soul Children

== Personnel ==
- Alexi – additional vocals (8)
- Milwaukee Buck – engineer (2, 3, 5–8, 10–13), mixing (4, 6, 10, 11)
- Demo Castellon – assistant engineer (2, 3, 7–9, 12)
- Celeste – additional vocals (6)
- Tom Coyne – mastering
- Brian Garten – engineer (4)
- Irv Gotti – executive producer, mixing (2, 3, 5, 7–9, 12, 13)
- Terry "Murda Mac" Herbert – assistant engineer (5)
- Eric Jackson – keyboards (2)
- Marc Lee – mixing assistant (2, 3, 7–9, 12)
- James Manning – bass guitar (2)
- Demi Doc McGhee – instrumentation (7)
- Keez Parker – instrumentation (7)
- Brian Springer – engineer (2), mixing (2, 3, 5, 7–9, 12, 13)
- Ja Rule – executive producer

== Charts ==
=== Weekly charts ===
Weekly chart performance for The Last Temptation by Ja Rule
Chart (2002–2003)	Peak position
Australian Albums (ARIA)	29
Australian Urban Albums (ARIA)	6
Canadian Albums (Nielsen SoundScan)	19
Canadian R&B Albums (Nielsen SoundScan)	9
Dutch Albums (Album Top 100)	44
European Top 100 Albums (Music & Media)	47
French Albums (SNEP)	97
German Albums (Offizielle Top 100)	50
Irish Albums (IRMA)	30
New Zealand Albums (RMNZ)	11
Scottish Albums (Official Charts)	40
Swiss Albums (Schweizer Hitparade)	27
UK Albums (Official Charts)	14
UK R&B Albums (Official Charts)	2
US Billboard 200	4
US Top R&B/Hip-Hop Albums (Billboard)	2

=== Year-end charts ===
2002 year-end chart performance for The Last Temptation
Chart (2002)	Position
Canadian Albums (Nielsen SoundScan)	149
Canadian R&B Albums (Nielsen SoundScan)	27
Canadian Rap Albums (Nielsen SoundScan)	13
UK Albums (OCC)	103

2003 year-end chart performance for The Last Temptation
Chart (2003)	Position
Australian Albums (ARIA)	95
US Billboard 200	40
US Top R&B/Hip-Hop Albums (Billboard)	14

== Certifications ==
Certifications for The Last Temptation
Region	Certification	Certified units/sales
Australia (ARIA)	Gold	35,000^{^}
Canada (Music Canada)	Platinum	100,000^{^}
United Kingdom (BPI)	Gold	100,000^{^}
United States (RIAA)	Platinum	1,000,000^{^}
^{^} Shipments figures based on certification alone.
