= Blood in My Eye =

Studio album by Ja Rule
- Released: November 4, 2003
- Genre: Hip hop
- Length: 44:56
- Label: Murder Inc.; Def Jam; Island Def Jam
- Producer: Irv Gotti (also exec.); Ja Rule (also exec.); BlackOut; Chink Santana; Jimi Kendrix; Rebel; Scott Storch; Sekou 720

Ja Rule chronology
The Last Temptation (2002)	Blood in My Eye (2003)	R.U.L.E. (2004)

Singles from Blood in My Eye
- 1. "Clap Back" Released: October 14, 2003

Blood in My Eye is the fifth studio album by American rapper Ja Rule, released on November 4, 2003, by Murder Inc., Island Def Jam Music Group and Def Jam. The album was originally planned to be released as a mixtape. The release took place during the feud with Shady/Aftermath rappers 50 Cent, G-Unit, Eminem, D12, Dr. Dre, Obie Trice, along with artists including DMX and Busta Rhymes and was entirely dedicated to dissing them. The album was named after George Jackson's radical book of the same name. Hussein Fatal of Outlawz, Cadillac Tah, James Gotti, Sizzla, Black Child, Young Merc, D.O. Cannon, Shadow, and Sekou 720 are listed as guest appearances on this album. Reviews for the record were mixed, with critics skeptical of Ja's lyrical skills as a hardcore rapper. Blood in My Eye debuted at number six on the Billboard 200 chart, with first-week sales of 140,000 copies in the United States.

== Critical reception ==
Professional ratings
Aggregate scores
Source	Rating
Metacritic	45/100
Review scores
Source	Rating
AllMusic	2/5 stars
Blender	2/5 stars
E!	C−
Entertainment Weekly	C
The Guardian	3/5 stars
Now	2/5 stars
Q	2/5 stars
RapReviews	5.5/10
Rolling Stone	2/5 stars
The Source	4/5 stars

Blood in My Eye garnered generally mixed or average reviews from music critics. At Metacritic, which assigns a normalized rating out of 100 to reviews from mainstream critics, the album received an average score of 45, based on 8 reviews.

Beccy Lindon of The Guardian called the record "a rough, back-to-basics rap album", noting that it is filled with guest verses from hardcore rappers and devoid of R&B artists, concluding that it is "more concerned with answering critics and continuing the backbiting with the Death Row camp." Jon Caramanica, writing for Rolling Stone, commended Ja for breaking away from his usual love duet formula to deliver shots at other rappers but said that "the boasts here feel utterly tired. And so does the attitude." Michael Endelman of Entertainment Weekly found the album to be "a dull slog with a dearth of hooks and a surfeit of gangsta clichés."

Steve 'Flash' Juon of RapReviews criticized the narrow-minded lyrical takedowns and suggested that Ja stick to mainstream R&B/hip-hop duets, despite crediting the production and collaborations with Hussein Fatal, saying that, "All things considered though, this short 45 minute album will not solve Ja's problems, nor will it restore him to chart dominance." AllMusic editor Jason Birchmeier called it "a very focused and heartfelt album", much more than his debut Venni Vetti Vecci, but felt that Ja worked better as a mainstream rapper crafting "catchy pop-rap tracks with grimy posturing and singalong hooks." He added that listeners would not get much out of the record, saying "there are only two quality songs, a lot of redundant trash-talking, and an overall sense of ridiculousness that pervades."

== Track listing ==
Credits adapted from the album's liner notes.

No.	Title	Writer(s)	Producer(s)	Length
1.	"Murder Intro"		Ja Rule; Irv Gotti	0:26
2.	"The Life" (featuring Hussein Fatal, Caddillac Tah and James Gotti)	Jeffrey Atkins; Bruce Washington; Taheem Crocker; James Floyd; Kendred Smith; Irving Lorenzo	Jimi Kendrix; Irv Gotti	4:35
3.	"Clap Back"	Atkins; Scott Storch; Lorenzo	Scott Storch; Irv Gotti (co.)	4:57
4.	"The Crown" (featuring Sizzla)	Atkins; Andre Parker; Lorenzo; Miguel Collins; Bobby Dixon	Chink Santana; Irv Gotti	3:45
5.	"Kay Slay" (Skit)		Ja Rule; Irv Gotti	0:18
6.	"Things Gon' Change" (featuring Black Child, Young Merc and D.O. Cannons) / "2 Punk Ass Quarters" (Skit)	Atkins; Smith; Lorenzo; Ramel Gill; Jeffery Crocker; Gerard Fields /; Atkins; Lorenzo	Jimi Kendrix; Irv Gotti /; Ja Rule; Irv Gotti	4:01
7.	"Race Against Time II"	Atkins; Smith; Lorenzo	Jimi Kendrix; Irv Gotti; Boogz (co.)	3:53
8.	"Bobby Creep" (Skit)	Richard Wilson; Lorenzo	Rebel; Irv Gotti	0:44
9.	"Niggas & Bitches"	Atkins; Winston Thomas; Lorenzo	BlackOut; Irv Gotti	4:34
10.	"The Inc Is Back" (featuring Shadow, Sekou 720 and Black Child)	Kyle Robinson; Sekou Branch; Gill; Atkins; Lorenzo; Kasseem Dean; David Styles; Sean Jacobs; Jason Phillips	Sekou 720; Irv Gotti	5:22
11.	"Remo" (Skit)	Wilson; Lorenzo; Jacobs; Phillips; Styles; Dean	Rebel; Irv Gotti	1:13
12.	"Blood in My Eye" (featuring Hussein Fatal)	Atkins; Washington; Smith; Lorenzo; Thomas Allen; Harold Brown; Morris Dickerson; Leroy Jordan; Lee Levitin; Charles Miller; Howard Scott	Jimi Kendrix; Irv Gotti	2:25
13.	"It's Murda (Freestyle)" (featuring Hussein Fatal)	Atkins; Washington; Lorenzo	Irv Gotti	3:36
14.	"The Wrap (Freestyle)" (featuring Hussein Fatal)	Atkins; Washington; Lorenzo; Albert Johnson; Kejuan Muchita; Tajuan Perry	Irv Gotti	5:09

• (co.) Co-producer

Sample credits

- "Murder Intro" contains dialogue from the motion picture Paid in Full.
- "The Crown" contains a sample of "Solid as a Rock", written by Miguel Collins and Bobby Dixon, performed by Sizzla.
- "The Inc Is Back" and "Remo (Skit)" contain a sample of "Streets Is Back", written by Sean Jacobs, Jason Phillips, David Styles, and Kasseem Dean; performed by The Lox.
- "Blood in My Eye" contains a sample of "Slippin' Into Darkness", written by Thomas Allen, Harold Brown, Morris Dickerson, Leroy Jordan, Lee Levitin, Charles Miller, and Howard Scott; performed by War.
- "The Wrap (Freestyle)" contains a sample of "Learning Burn", written by Albert Johnson, Kejuan Muchita, and Tajuan Perry; performed by Mobb Deep.

== Personnel ==
- Ja Rule – executive producer
- Ashanti – additional vocals (2)
- Milwaukee Buck – engineer (2–14), mixing (1, 5, 6b, 8, 11, 13, 14)
- Tom Coyne – mastering
- DURO – mixing (2, 3, 6a, 7, 9, 10, 12)
- Irv Gotti – executive producer, mixing (1–6, 8–14), engineer (11)
- Terry "T-Mac" Herbert – assistant engineer (2–10, 12–14)
- A&R [A&R Administration] – Hector "Rick Boogie" Aviles
- A&R [A&R Assistant] – Errol "BeEezie" Vaughn Jr.
- A&R [A&R Direction/Joint Venture] – Darcell Lawrence
- A&R [A&R Direction] – Chris Gotti
- A&R [Assistant A&R Direction] – Fred "Nickels" Moore, Tood "ShortMan" Simms
- Illustration [For MelaninInc.com] – Andre LeRoy Davis
- Management – Murda Management
- Photography By – Anthony Mandler
- Producer – BlackOut (6) (tracks: 9), Chink Santana The Gawd, Irv Gotti (tracks: 1, 2, 4 to 15), Ja Rule (tracks: 1, 5, 6b), Jimi Kendrix (tracks: 2, 6a, 7, 12), Rebel (tracks: 8, 11), Scott Storch (tracks: 3), Sekou 720 (tracks: 10)

== Charts ==
=== Weekly charts ===
Chart (2003)	Peak position
Australian Albums (ARIA)	79
Canadian Albums (Nielsen SoundScan)	32
Canadian R&B Albums (Nielsen SoundScan)	10
German Albums (Offizielle Top 100)	98
Scottish Albums (OCC)	67
Swiss Albums (Schweizer Hitparade)	92
UK Albums (OCC)	51
UK R&B Albums (OCC)	13
US Billboard 200	6
US Top R&B/Hip-Hop Albums (Billboard)	1

=== Year-end charts ===
Chart (2004)	Position
US Top R&B/Hip-Hop Albums (Billboard)	100

== See also ==
- List of Billboard number-one R&B albums of 2003
