= Missy Elliott discography =

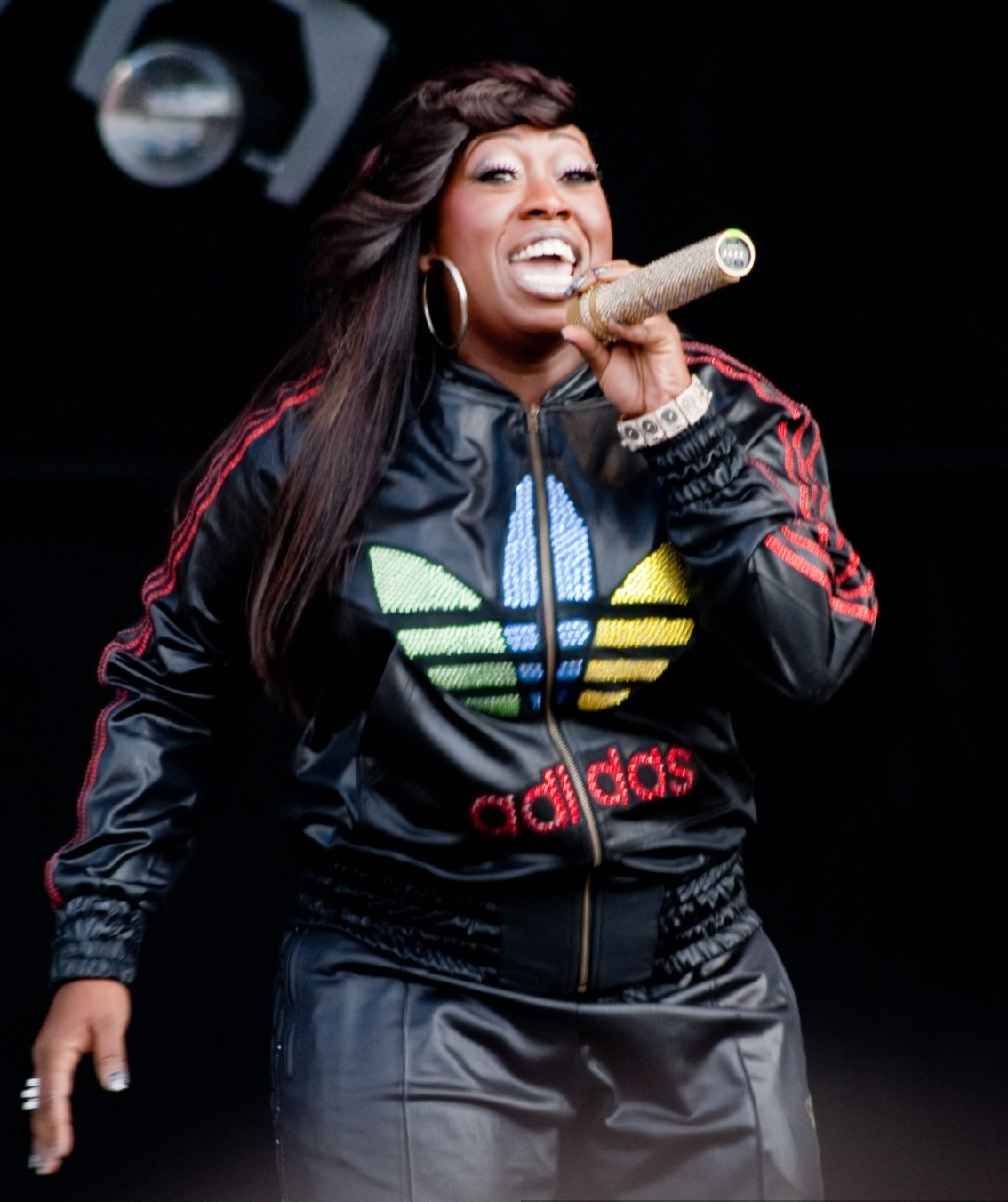
- Elliott performing in 2006
- Studio albums: 6
- Extended plays: 1
- Compilation albums: 3
- Singles: 75
- Music videos: 22

The discography of American rapper Missy Elliott consists of six studio albums, three compilation albums, one extended play, seventy-five singles (including forty-four as a featured performer) and twenty solo music videos.

== Albums ==
=== Studio albums ===
List of studio albums, with selected chart positions and certifications
Title	Album details	Peak chart positions										Certifications	Sales
Title	Album details	US	AUS	BEL	GER	IRE	NL	NZ	SWE	SWI	UK	Certifications	Sales
Supa Dupa Fly	Released: July 15, 1997; Label: The Goldmind, Elektra; Formats: CD, LP, cassette, digital download	3	—	—	—	—	69	49	—	—	124	RIAA: Platinum; BPI: Silver	US: 1,221,000; World: 2,542,468
Da Real World	Released: June 22, 1999; Label: The Goldmind, Elektra; Formats: CD, LP, cassette, digital download	10	—	—	20	—	57	—	59	42	42	RIAA: Platinum; BPI: Silver	US: 1,068,000; World: 6,000,000
Miss E... So Addictive	Released: May 15, 2001; Label: The Goldmind, Elektra; Formats: CD, LP, cassette, digital download	2	81	11	12	45	14	32	29	16	10	RIAA: Platinum; BPI: Platinum; MC: Platinum	US: 1,767,000; UK: 317,000; World: 5,297,324
Under Construction	Released: November 12, 2002; Label: The Goldmind, Elektra; Formats: CD, LP, cassette, digital download	3	26	39	19	48	37	32	23	26	23	RIAA: 2× Platinum; ARIA: Platinum; BPI: Gold; RMNZ: Gold	US: 2,142,000; UK: 260,000; World: 3,377,521
This Is Not a Test!	Released: November 25, 2003; Label: The Goldmind, Elektra; Formats: CD, LP, cassette, digital download	13	39	32	37	—	44	35	50	25	47	RIAA: Platinum; ARIA: Gold; BPI: Gold; MC: Gold	US: 705,000
The Cookbook	Released: July 4, 2005; Label: The Goldmind, Atlantic; Formats: CD, LP, digital download	2	19	20	19	47	21	20	41	8	33	RIAA: Platinum; RMNZ: Gold	US: 657,000
"—" denotes releases that did not chart or were not released in that territory.

=== Compilation albums ===
List of compilation albums, with selected chart positions and certifications
Title	Album details	Peak chart positions								Certifications	Sales
Title	Album details	AUS	BEL (FL)	GER	IRE	NL	NZ	SWI	UK	Certifications	Sales
Recipe of Hits	Released: September 13, 2005; Label: Atlantic; Formats: CD, digital download	—	—	—	—	—	—	—	—		
Respect M.E.	Released: September 4, 2006; Label: The Goldmind, Atlantic; Formats: CD, LP, digital download	26	37	40	11	54	7	25	7	BPI: Gold; IRMA: Gold; RMNZ: Gold	UK: 100,000
Original Album Series	Released: September 13, 2013; Label: Rhino, Warner; Formats: CD, digital download	—	—	—	—	—	—	—	—		
"—" denotes releases that did not chart or were not released in that territory.

=== Box sets ===
List of box set albums
Title	Album details
Super Dupa Fly / Da Real World	Released: August 15, 2003; Label: Warner; Formats: CD, digital download
3 For One : Miss E ...So Addictive / Da Real World / Supa Dupa Fly	Released: December 15, 2003; Label: Warner; Formats: CD, digital download
Da Real World / Supa Dupa Fly	Released: August 4, 2008; Label: Atlantic; Formats: CD, digital download

== Extended plays ==
List of EPs
Title	EP details	Peak chart positions		
Title	EP details	US	CAN	SWI
Iconology	Released: August 23, 2019; Label: Atlantic; Formats: Digital download, streaming	24	52	68

== Singles ==
=== As lead artist ===
List of singles, with selected chart positions and certifications, showing year released and album name
Title	Year	Peak chart positions													Certifications	Album
Title	Year	US	US R&B	US Rap	US Dance	AUS	BEL	FRA	GER	IRE	NL	NZ	SWI	UK	Certifications	Album
"The Rain (Supa Dupa Fly)"	1997	—	4	—	—	—	—	—	—	—	44	10	—	16		Supa Dupa Fly
"Sock It 2 Me" (featuring Da Brat)	1997	12	4	—	—	—	—	—	41	—	56	5	—	33	RIAA: Platinum	Supa Dupa Fly
"Beep Me 911" (featuring 702 and Magoo)	1998	—	—	—	—	—	—	—	—	—	—	13	—	14		Supa Dupa Fly
"Hit Em wit da Hee" (featuring Lil' Kim and Mocha)	1998	—	—	—	—	—	—	—	63	—	—	27	—	25		Supa Dupa Fly
"She's a Bitch"	1999	90	30	19	—	70	—	—	84	—	53	26	—	—		Da Real World
"All n My Grill" (featuring Nicole Wray, MC Solaar or Big Boi)	1999	64	16	—	—	—	9	16	22	—	86	—	23	20	SNEP: Gold	Da Real World
"Hot Boyz" (featuring Lil' Mo, Nas, Eve and Q-Tip)	1999	5	1	1	—	—	—	78	52	—	78	34	—	18	RIAA: Platinum	Da Real World
"Get Ur Freak On"	2001	7	3	7	—	44	17	39	19	25	9	24	16	4	RIAA: 2× Platinum; BPI: Platinum; RMNZ: Platinum	Miss E... So Addictive
"Lick Shots"	2001	—	63	25	—	—	—	—	—	—	—	—	—	—		Miss E... So Addictive
"One Minute Man" (featuring Ludacris)	2001	15	8	—	—	91	25	31	38	47	41	—	92	10	RMNZ: Gold	Miss E... So Addictive
"Take Away" (featuring Ginuwine and Tweet)	2001	45	13	—	—	—	59	—	96	—	—	—	—	—		Miss E... So Addictive
"4 My People" (featuring Eve)	2002	—	—	—	—	20	3	37	21	12	2	—	40	5	BPI: Silver	Miss E... So Addictive
"Work It"	2002	2	1	1	—	6	22	60	32	19	12	3	14	6	RIAA: 3× Platinum; ARIA: Gold; BPI: Platinum; FIMI: Gold; RMNZ: 2× Platinum	Under Construction
"Gossip Folks" (featuring Ludacris)	2002	8	5	2	1	22	24	—	28	28	50	—	50	9		Under Construction
"Pussycat"	2003	77	26	15	—	—	—	—	—	—	—	—	—	—		Under Construction
"Back in the Day" (featuring Jay-Z)	2003	—	86	—	—	—	—	—	—	—	—	—	—	—		Under Construction
"Fighting Temptation" (with Beyoncé, Free and MC Lyte)	2003	—	—	—	—	—	37	—	54	—	11	—	42	—		The Fighting Temptations
"Pass That Dutch"	2003	27	17	9	35	26	27	—	55	25	38	—	31	10	RMNZ: Gold	This Is Not a Test!
"I'm Really Hot"	2004	59	26	18	—	35	—	—	—	32	—	25	73	22		This Is Not a Test!
"Lose Control" (featuring Ciara and Fatman Scoop)	2005	3	6	3	5	7	24	—	25	16	24	2	21	7	RIAA: 3× Platinum; ARIA: Gold; BPI: Gold; RMNZ: Platinum	The Cookbook
"Teary Eyed"	2005	—	—	—	30	38	—	—	64	44	—	—	38	47		The Cookbook
"We Run This"	2006	48	—	—	—	23	—	—	73	30	—	—	—	38		The Cookbook
"Ching-a-Ling"	2008	60	28	11	—	—	— (Note: "Ching-a-Ling" did not enter the Ultratop 50, but peaked at number 20 on the Flemish Ultratip chart.)	—	85	—	97	24	—	180		Step Up 2: The Streets
"Shake Your Pom Pom"	2008	95	—	—	—	—	—	—	—	—	—	—	—	113		Step Up 2: The Streets
"Best, Best"	2008	—	94	—	—	—	—	—	—	—	—	—	—	—		Non-album singles
"WTF (Where They From)" (featuring Pharrell Williams)	2015	22	8	5	26	45	— (Note: "WTF (Where They From)" did not enter the Ultratop 50, but peaked at number 15 on the Flemish Ultratip chart.)	73	82	—	—	—	—	66	RIAA: Platinum	Non-album singles
"I'm Better" (featuring Lamb)	2017	71	28	18	—	—	—	120	—	—	—	—	—	—		Non-album singles
"Throw It Back"	2019	— (Note: "Throw It Back" did not enter the Billboard Hot 100, but peaked at number 1 on the Bubbling Under Hot 100 chart.)	37	—	—	—	—	—	—	—	—	— (Note: "Throw It Back" did not enter the NZ Top 40 Singles Chart, but peaked at number 37 on the NZ Hot Singles Chart.)	—	— (Note: "Throw It Back" did not enter the UK Singles Chart, but peaked at number 57 on the UK Singles Downloads Chart.)		Iconology
"DripDemeanor" (featuring Sum1)	2019	— (Note: "Wreck Me Good"R&B/Hip-Hop Airplay chart.)	—	—	—	—	—	—	—	—	—	—	—	—		Iconology
"Ratata" (with Skrillex and Mr. Oizo)	2023	—	—	—	—	—	—	—	—	—	—	—	—	—	RMNZ: Gold	Quest for Fire
"—" denotes releases that did not chart or were not released in that territory.

=== As featured artist ===
List of singles, with selected chart positions and certifications, showing year released and album name
Title	Year	Peak chart positions										Certifications	Album
Title	Year	US	AUS	BEL (FL)	GER	IRE	NL	NZ	SWE	SWI	UK	Certifications	Album
"That's What Little Girls Are Made Of" (Raven-Symoné featuring Missy Elliott)	1993	68	—	—	—	—	—	—	—	—	—		Here's to New Dreams
"Ooh, Ooh Baby" (Taral Hicks featuring Missy Elliott)	1996	— (Note: "Ooh, Ooh Baby" did not enter the US Hot 100 but peaked at number 81 on the US Billboard Hot R&B Singles)	—	—	—	—	—	—	—	—	—		This Time
"The Things That You Do" (Gina Thompson featuring Missy Elliott)	1996	41	—	—	—	—	—	—	—	—	—		Nobody Does It Better
"Steelo" (702 featuring Missy Elliott)	1996	32	—	—	—	—	—	23	—	—	41	RIAA: Gold	No Doubt
"Do Thangz" (Men of Vizion featuring Missy Elliott)	1996	— (Note: "Do Thangz" did not enter the US Hot 100 but peaked at number 53 on the US Billboard Hot R&B Singles chart.)	—	—	—	—	—	—	—	—	—		Personal
"You Don't Have to Worry" (New Edition featuring Missy Elliott)	1996	— (Note: "You Don't Have to Worry" did not enter the US Hot 100 but peaked at number 7 on the US Billboard Hot R&B Singles chart.)	—	—	—	—	—	—	—	—	—		Home Again
"Cold Rock a Party" (MC Lyte featuring Missy Elliott)	1996	11	91	—	15	—	36	1	6	22	15	RIAA: Gold; RMNZ: Platinum	Bad As I Wanna B
"Can We" (SWV featuring Missy Elliott)	1997	75	—	—	—	—	—	1	—	—	18	RMNZ: Gold	Release Some Tension
"Not Tonight" (Lil' Kim featuring Da Brat, Missy Elliott, Lisa "Left-Eye" Lopes and Angie Martinez)	1997	6	—	—	99	—	31	4	52	—	11	RIAA: Platinum; RMNZ: Gold	Hard Core
"Up Jumps da Boogie" (Timbaland & Magoo featuring Missy Elliott and Aaliyah)	1997	12	—	—	—	—	—	—	—	—	—	RIAA: Gold	Welcome to Our World
"What About Us" (Total featuring Missy Elliott and Timbaland)	1997	16	—	—	—	—	—	48	—	—	—	RIAA: Gold	Soul Food
"5 Minutes" (Lil' Mo featuring Missy Elliott)	1998	—	—	—	—	—	—	—	—	—	72		Why Do Fools Fall in Love
"Make It Hot" (Nicole featuring Missy Elliott and Mocha)	1998	5	—	—	—	—	57	26	—	—	22	RIAA: Gold	Make It Hot
"Trippin'" (Total featuring Missy Elliott)	1998	7	—	—	—	—	—	—	—	—	—	RIAA: Gold	Kima, Keisha, and Pam
"I Want You Back" (Melanie B featuring Missy Elliott)	1998	—	12	24	37	6	6	20	21	25	1	BPI: Silver	Hot
"Here We Come" (Timbaland featuring Magoo and Missy Elliott)	1998	92	—	—	—	—	33	—	—	—	43		Tim's Bio: Life from da Bassment
"I Like Control" (DJ Clue? featuring Missy Elliott, Mocha and Nicole Wray)	1999	—	—	—	—	—	—	—	—	—	—		The Professional
"Ya Di Ya" (Gina Thompson featuring Missy Elliott)	1999	— (Note: "Ya Di Ya" did not enter the Billboard Hot 100, but peaked at number 24 on the Bubbling Under Hot 100 Singles chart.)	—	—	85	—	—	—	—	—	—		If You Only Knew
"Take That" (Torrey Carter featuring Missy Elliott)	2000	87	—	—	—	—	—	—	—	—	—		The Life I Live
"Is That Yo Chick (The Lost Verses)" (Memphis Bleek featuring Missy Elliott, Twista and Jay-Z)	2000	68	—	—	—	—	—	—	—	—	—		The Understanding
"Son of a Gun (I Betcha Think This Song Is About You)" (Janet Jackson and Carly Simon featuring Missy Elliott and P. Diddy)	2001	28	20	20	69	21	34	49	48	56	13		All for You
"Oops (Oh My)" (Tweet featuring Missy Elliott)	2002	7	18	48	23	—	32	38	34	36	5		Southern Hummingbird
"The Knoc" (Knoc-turn'al featuring Dr. Dre and Missy Elliott)	2002	98	—	—	—	—	—	—	—	—	—		L.A. Confidential presents: Knoc-turn'al
"Burnin' Up" (Faith Evans featuring Missy Elliott)	2002	60	—	—	—	—	—	—	—	—	—		Faithfully
"Crew Deep" (Skillz featuring Missy Elliott and Kandi)	2002	—	—	—	—	—	—	—	—	—	—		I Ain't Mad No More
"Honk Your Horn" (Dani Stevenson featuring Missy Elliott)	2002	—	—	—	—	—	—	—	—	—	—		Is There Another?!
"Cop That Shit" (Timbaland & Magoo featuring Missy Elliott)	2003	95	34	59	—	39	98	34	—	82	22		Under Construction, Part II
"Party to Damascus" (Wyclef Jean featuring Missy Elliott)	2003	65	—	61	65	—	—	—	49	—	29		The Preacher's Son
"Tush" (Ghostface Killah featuring Missy Elliott)	2004	—	—	—	—	—	—	—	—	—	34		The Pretty Toney Album
"Car Wash" (Christina Aguilera featuring Missy Elliott)	2004	63	2	2	6	5	3	2	27	5	4	ARIA: Gold; BPI: Silver; RIANZ: Gold	Shark Tale
"Turn da Lights Off" (Tweet featuring Missy Elliott)	2004	— (Note: "Turn da Lights Off" did not enter the Billboard Hot 100, but peaked at number 8 on the Bubbling Under Hot 100 Singles chart.)	—	—	—	—	—	—	—	—	29		It's Me Again
"1, 2 Step" (Ciara featuring Missy Elliott)	2004	2	2	14	7	3	12	2	23	5	3	RIAA: 7× Platinum; ARIA: Platinum; BPI: Platinum; RMNZ: 4× Platinum	Goodies
"Let It Go" (Keyshia Cole featuring Missy Elliott and Lil' Kim)	2007	7	—	—	72	—	—	—	—	—	—	RIAA: Platinum; BPI: Silver; RMNZ: Platinum	Just Like You
"Bad Girl" (Danity Kane featuring Missy Elliott)	2008	— (Note: "Bad Girl" did not enter the Billboard Hot 100, but peaked at number 10 on the Bubbling Under Hot 100 Singles chart.)	—	—	—	—	—	—	—	—	—		Welcome to the Dollhouse
"Need U Bad" (Jazmine Sullivan featuring Missy Elliott)	2008	37	—	—	—	—	—	—	—	—	—		Fearless
"Whatcha Think About That" (Pussycat Dolls featuring Missy Elliott)	2008	— (Note: "Whatcha Think About That" did not enter the Billboard Hot 100, but peaked at number 8 on the Bubbling Under Hot 100 Singles chart.)	—	—	—	12	—	—	—	—	9	BPI: Silver	Doll Domination
"Get Involved" (Ginuwine featuring Missy Elliott and Timbaland)	2009	—	—	48	35	—	—	—	—	—	—		A Man's Thoughts
"Let's Just Do It" (Lisa "Left-Eye" Lopes featuring Missy Elliott and TLC)	2009	—	—	—	—	—	—	—	—	—	—		Eye Legacy
"Work" (Ciara featuring Missy Elliott)	2009	—	66	—	—	31	—	—	46	—	52		Fantasy Ride
"Fakin' It" (K. Michelle featuring Missy Elliott)	2009	—	—	—	—	—	—	—	—	—	—		Pain Medicine
"Nobody's Perfect" (J. Cole featuring Missy Elliott)	2012	61	—	—	—	—	—	—	—	—	—	RIAA: Gold; RMNZ: Platinum	Cole World: The Sideline Story
"How Ya Doin'?" (Little Mix featuring Missy Elliott)	2013	—	29	82	—	26	91	—	—	—	16	ARIA: Gold; BPI: Silver	DNA
"Without Me" (Fantasia featuring Kelly Rowland and Missy Elliott)	2013	74	—	—	—	—	—	—	—	—	—		Side Effects of You
"I Deserve It" (Faith Evans featuring Missy Elliott and Sharaya J)	2014	—	—	—	—	—	—	—	—	—	—		Incomparable
"Burnitup!" (Janet Jackson featuring Missy Elliott)	2015	—	— (Note: "Burnitup!" did not enter the Hot R&B/Hip-Hop Songs chart, but peaked at number 3 on the Bubbling Under R&B/Hip-Hop Singles chart.)	— (Note: "Burnitup!" did not enter the Ultratop 50, but peaked at number 68 on the Flemish Ultratip chart.)	—	—	—	—	—	—	—		Unbreakable
"This Is for My Girls" (among Artists for Let Girls Learn)	2016	— (Note: "This Is for My Girls" did not enter the Billboard Hot 100, but peaked at number 5 on the Dance Club Songs chart.)	—	—	—	—	—	—	—	—	—		Non-album single
"Ghostbusters (I'm Not Afraid)" (Fall Out Boy featuring Missy Elliott)	2016	—	—	—	—	—	—	—	—	—	—		Ghostbusters
"Get It" (Busta Rhymes featuring Missy Elliott and Kelly Rowland)	2018	—	—	—	—	—	—	—	—	—	—		Non-album singles
"Level Up (Remix)" (Ciara featuring Missy Elliott and Fatman Scoop)	2018	—	—	—	—	—	—	—	—	—	—		Non-album singles
"Tempo" (Lizzo featuring Missy Elliott)	2019	— (Note: "Tempo" did not enter the Billboard Hot 100, but peaked at number eight on the Bubbling Under Hot 100 chart.)	—	29	—	—	—	—	—	—	—	RIAA: Platinum; MC: Gold; RMNZ: Gold	Cuz I Love You
"Do It (Remix)" (Toni Braxton featuring Missy Elliott)	2020	— (Note: "Do It" did not enter the Billboard Hot 100, but peaked at number 13 on the Hot R&B Songs chart.)	—	—	—	—	—	—	—	—	—		Non-album single
"Levitating (The Blessed Madonna Remix)" (Dua Lipa featuring Madonna and Missy Elliott)	2020	— (Note: "Levitating" did not enter the Billboard Hot 100, but peaked at number ten on the Bubbling Under Hot 100 chart.)	—	— (Note: "Levitating" did not enter the Ultratop 50 chart, but peaked at number 43 on the Ultratip chart.)	—	—	15	— (Note: "Levitating" did not enter the NZ Top 40 Singles Chart, but peaked at number nine on the NZ Hot Singles Chart.)	—	—	39		Club Future Nostalgia
"ATM" (Bree Runway featuring Missy Elliott)	2020	—	—	—	—	—	—	—	—	—	—		2000and4Eva
"Trampoline" (David Guetta and Afrojack featuring Missy Elliott, Bia and Doechii)	2022	―	―	―	―	―	―	―	―	―	―		Non-album single
"Lobby" (Anitta featuring Missy Elliott)	2022	―	―	―	―	―	―	―	―	―	―		Versions of Me
"Fly Girl" (Flo featuring Missy Elliott)	2023	―	―	―	―	―	―	― (Note: "Fly Girl" did not enter the main New Zealand Singles Chart, but peaked at number 20 on the New Zealand Hot Singles Chart.)	―	―	38		Non-album single
"Back and Forth" (Kehlani featuring Missy Elliott)	2026	―	―	―	―	―	―	― (Note: "Back and Forth" did not enter the NZ Top 40 Singles Chart, but peaked at number 10 on the NZ Hot Singles Chart.)	―	―	―		Kehlani
"—" denotes releases that did not chart or were not released in that territory.

=== Promotional singles ===
List of songs, with selected chart positions, showing year released and album name
Title	Year	Peak chart positions	Album
Title	Year	US R&B	Album
"It's a Woman's World"	2002	—	Non-album singles
"Triple Threat" (with Timbaland)	2012	— (Note: "Triple Threat" did not enter the US Hip-Hop/R&B Songs chart, but peaked at number 34 on the US Billboard Hot R&B/Hip-Hop Digital Songs chart.)	Non-album singles
"9th Inning" (with Timbaland)	2012	— (Note: "9th Inning" did not enter the US Hip-Hop/R&B Songs chart, but peaked at number 43 on the US Billboard Hot R&B/Hip-Hop Digital Songs chart.)	Non-album singles
"Pep Rally"	2016	—	Non-album singles
"Why I Still Love You"	2020	—	Iconology
"Cool Off"	2020	—	Iconology
"Little Miss (Misdemeanor)" (with Girlset)	2026	—	Non-album single
"—" denotes releases that did not chart or were not released in that territory.

== Other charted and certified songs ==
List of songs, with selected chart positions and certifications, showing year released and album name
Title	Year	Peak chart positions				Certifications	Album
Title	Year	US	US R&B	KOR	UK	Certifications	Album
"Keep It G.A.N.G.S.T.A." (Amended Remix) (Nate Dogg featuring Lil' Mo and Missy Elliott)	2001	—	—	—	—	RMNZ: Gold	Music & Me
"Funky Fresh Dressed" (featuring Ms. Jade)	2002	—	— (Note: "Funky Fresh Dressed" did not enter the Hot R&B/Hip-Hop Songs chart, but peaked at number 8 on the Bubbling Under R&B/Hip-Hop Singles chart.)	—	—		Under Construction
"(When Kim Say) Can You Hear Me Now?" (Lil' Kim featuring Missy Elliott)	2003	—	— (Note: "(When Kim Say) Can You Hear Me Now?" did not enter the Hot R&B/Hip-Hop Songs chart, but peaked at number 1 on the Bubbling Under R&B/Hip-Hop Singles chart.)	—	—		La Bella Mafia
"Wake Up" (featuring Jay-Z)	2003	—	— (Note: "Wake Up" did not enter the Hot R&B/Hip-Hop Songs chart, but peaked at number 20 on the Bubbling Under R&B/Hip-Hop Singles chart.)	—	—		This Is Not a Test!
"Wake Up Everybody" (with Various Artists)	2004	—	— (Note: "Wake Up Everybody" did not enter the Hot R&B/Hip-Hop Songs chart, but peaked at number 19 on the Bubbling Under R&B/Hip-Hop Singles chart.)	—	—		Wake Up Everybody
"Where Could He Be" (Aaliyah featuring Missy Elliott and Tweet)	2005	—	— (Note: "Where Could He Be" did not enter the Hot R&B/Hip-Hop Songs chart, but peaked at number 20 on the Bubbling Under R&B/Hip-Hop Singles chart.)	—	—		Non-album song
"On and On"	2005	—	— (Note: "On and On" did not enter the Hot R&B/Hip-Hop Songs chart, but peaked at number 9 on the Bubbling Under R&B/Hip-Hop Singles chart.)	—	—		The Cookbook
"Bounce" (Timbaland featuring Justin Timberlake, Dr. Dre and Missy Elliott)	2007	—	—	—	176		Shock Value
"All Night Long" (Demi Lovato featuring Missy Elliott and Timbaland)	2011	— (Note: "All Night Long" did not enter the Billboard Hot 100, but peaked at number 24 on the Bubbling Under Hot 100 Singles chart.)	—	—	—		Unbroken
"Niliria" (G-Dragon featuring Missy Elliott)	2013	—	—	9	—		Coup d'Etat
"Borderline" (Ariana Grande featuring Missy Elliott)	2018	— (Note: "Borderline" did not enter the Billboard Hot 100, but peaked at number 23 on the Bubbling Under Hot 100 Singles chart.)	—	—	—		Sweetener
"—" denotes releases that did not chart or were not released in that territory.

== Guest appearances ==
List of guest appearances, with other performing artists, showing year released and album name
Title	Year	Other performer(s)	Album
"Wonder Funky Groove"	1991	Timbaland	—N/a
"Won't Waste You"	1993	Jodeci	Diary of a Mad Band
"Sweaty"	1993	Jodeci, Mr. Dalvin	Diary of a Mad Band
"Betcha' Didn't Know"	1993	Raven-Symoné	Here's to New Dreams
"That's What Little Girls Are Made Of (Dub Mix)"	1993	Raven-Symoné	Here's to New Dreams
"It's Alright"	1995	Craig Mack	Dangerous Minds soundtrack
"Sweat You Down" (Alternate)	1995	Craig Mack	Da Bassment Demo Tape
"U Better Be Ready"	1995	—N/a	Da Bassment Demo Tape
"Find My Love" (Alternate)	1995	—N/a	Da Bassment Demo Tape
"Plenty of Styles"	1995	Timbaland & Magoo	Da Bassment Demo Tape
"Brand New" (Mr. Dalvin's Ferrari Mix)	1995	Mr. Dalvin, Static of Playa	Da Bassment Demo Tape
"Peepin' My Style"	1995	Timbaland, Static of Playa	Da Bassment Demo Tape
"Get Down"	1995	Timbaland, Virginia Williams	Da Bassment Demo Tape
"Let Me in Your Life" (Taral Demo)	1995	Virginia Williams	Da Bassment Demo Tape
"Red Lights"	1995	Timbaland	Da Bassment Demo Tape
"Curiosity" (Misdemeanor Remix)	1995	Aaron Hall	Curiosity (CD5)
"So Good"	1995	Average Guyz	First Come First Served
"Beats 4 da Streets (Intro)"	1996	Aaliyah	One in a Million
"Hot Like Fire"	1996	Aaliyah	One in a Million
"Ladies in da House"	1996	Aaliyah, Timbaland	One in a Million
"If Your Girl Only Knew" (The New Remix)	1996	Aaliyah, Timbaland	If Your Girl Only Knew single
"One in a Million" (Remix)	1996	Aaliyah, Timbaland, Ginuwine	One in a Million (Remixes)
"Get Down Like Dat"	1996	702	No Doubt
"Steelo" (Timbaland Mix)	1996	702	Steelo (Vinyl)
"Sexuality (Take Your Love Away)" (Timbaland Street Remix)	1996	Terri & Monica	Sexuality single
"G. Thang"	1996	Ginuwine, Magoo	Ginuwine...the Bachelor
"All the Times"	1997	LSG, Faith Evans, Coko	Levert.Sweat.Gill
"My Body" (Remix)	1997	LSG	My Body single
"Crank Me Up"	1997	Adina Howard	Welcome to Fantasy Island
"Keys to My House"	1997	LeVert	Whole Scenario
"Go Deep" (Timbaland Remix)	1997	Janet Jackson	Go Deep single
"Speakers Blow"	1997	702	DJ Goldfinger: Motown New Flavas, Vol. 2
"Man Undercover"	1997	Timbaland & Magoo, Aaliyah	Welcome to Our World
"Up Jumps da Boogie" (Remix)	1997	Timbaland & Magoo, Aaliyah	Welcome to Our World
"In My Business"	1998	MC Lyte	Seven & Seven
"Want What I Got"	1998	MC Lyte, Mocha	Seven & Seven
"Joy to the World"	1998	Nicole	Mentor and the Hip-Hop Owls: A Christmas Story
"The Time Is Now"	1998	Nicole	Make It Hot
"Seventeen"	1998	Nicole	Make It Hot
"I Can't See"	1998	Nicole	Make It Hot
"Boy You Should Listen"	1998	Nicole	Make It Hot
"In da Street"	1998	Nicole, Mocha	Make It Hot
"Get Contact" (Demo)	1998	—N/a	Make It Hot
"He Be Back" (Demo)	1998	Coko	Make It Hot
"Freestyle Over Wu-Tang Clan's "Triumph" Instrumental"	1998	Funkmaster Flex	The Mix Tape, Vol. 3: 60 Minutes of Funk, The Final Chapter
"Hit Em wit da Hee" (Remix)	1998	Mocha, Lil' Kim	Can't Hardly Wait soundtrack
"Bye Bye"	1998	Mýa	Mýa
"Ms. Parker"	1998	Playa	Cheers 2 U
"He Be Back"	1998	Coko	Why Do Fools Fall in Love soundtrack
"Get Contact"	1998	Busta Rhymes	Why Do Fools Fall in Love soundtrack
"What the Dealio"	1998	Total	Why Do Fools Fall in Love soundtrack
"In My Business"	1998	Whitney Houston	My Love Is Your Love
"Do You Wanna Ride?"	1998	Yo Yo, Kelly Price, Lil' Mo	Ebony
"I Would If I Could"	1998	Yo Yo	Ebony
"Say Goodbye"	1998	Pudgee tha Phat Bastard	Unreleased 92 - 98
"24 Hrs. to Live" (Female Remix)	1998	Queen Pen, Lil' Kim, Foxy Brown	—N/a
"Talking on the Phone"	1998	Keli Nicole Price	Tim's Bio: Life from da Bassment
"John Blaze"	1998	Aaliyah	Tim's Bio: Life from da Bassment
"Do Something"	1998	Total, Mocha	Kima, Keisha, and Pam
"Confessions"	1999	Destiny's Child	The Writing's on the Wall
"Where My Girls At?" (Remix)	1999	702	Where My Girls At? single
"Vivrant Thing" (Remix)	1999	Q-Tip, Busta Rhymes	Violator (Remixes)
"Let Me Get Down"	1999	The Notorious B.I.G., Craig Mack, G. Dep	Born Again
"Feelin' da Love"	1999	Paula Cole	Amen
"Ain't Got No Dough"	1999	Eve	Let There Be Eve...Ruff Ryders' First Lady
"Wethuggedout"	1999	Noreaga	Melvin Flynt – Da Hustler
"Heartbreaker" (Remix)	1999	Mariah Carey, Da Brat	Rainbow
"That's What I'm Looking For"	2000	Da Brat, Jermaine Dupri	Big Momma's House soundtrack
"Gotta Leave" (Remix)	2000	702	Gotta Leave single
"Bangin' (Don't Lie)" (Remix)	2000	Nicole, Prodigy of Mobb Deep	—N/a
"Make It Hot (Nicole's Groove)"	2000	Nicole	UK Garage: The Album - The Sound of 2000
"Nasty Girl 2000"	2000	Janet Jackson, Aaliyah	—N/a
"Can't Go for That" (Missy's Mix)	2000	Tamia, 213	Can't Go for That single
"Wanna Be"	2000	Tamia	A Nu Day
"Club 2G" (Demo)	2000	Nicole Wray	Dark Angel soundtrack
"Floss Ya Jewels"	2000	Torrey Carter	The Life I Live
"Same 'Ol"	2000	Torrey Carter	The Life I Live
"O.K."	2000	Torrey Carter, Petey Pablo, Trick Daddy	The Life I Live
"Starstruck"	2000	Lil' Mo	Based on a True Story
"Club 2G"	2000	Lil' Mo, Naam	Based on a True Story
"Who You Gonna Call?"	2000	—N/a	Any Given Sunday soundtrack
"X"	2001	Ja Rule, Tweet	Violator: The Album, V2.0/Pain Is Love
"Where Could He Be?"	2001	Aaliyah, Tweet	Aaliyah
"Androgyny" (Remix)	2001	Garbage	Androgyny single
"Hide Away"	2001	Mick Jagger	Goddess in the Doorway
"Bootylicious (Rockwilder Remix)"	2001	Destiny's Child	Carmen: A Hip Hopera soundtrack
"Make It Hot (Nicole's Groove Remix)"	2001	Nicole, DJ Luck & MC Neat, MC Breeze, Phaze 1	DJ Luck & MC Neat present... III
"I Know Whutcha U Like"	2001	Mocha, Petey Pablo, Lil' Mo	Bella Mafia
"Mardi Gras"	2001	Mocha, Lil' Mo	Bella Mafia
"Keep It G.A.N.G.S.T.A." (Remix)	2001	Nate Dogg, Lil' Mo	"Keep It G.A.N.G.S.T.A." single
"Single Life" (Interlude)	2001	Nicole	Elektric Blue
"Last Night a DJ..."	2001	Nicole	Elektric Blue
"(No Joke) Mama Used to Say"	2001	Nicole, Redman	Elektric Blue
"Dat Bitch"	2001	Redman	Malpractice
"Tipi Ti on My Cappi Town"	2001	DJ Prince Paul, Lance Crouther	Pootie Tang soundtrack
"Get Ur Freak On" (Remix)	2001	Nelly Furtado	Lara Croft: Tomb Raider soundtrack
"Violator Run This"	2001	—N/a	Violator: The Album, V2.0
"Quick Rush"	2001	Total	Bait soundtrack
"Higher Ground"	2002	Karen Clark-Sheard, Yolanda Adams, Kim Burrell, Dorinda Clark-Cole, Mary Mary, Tweet	2nd Chance
"Lights, Camera, Action!" (Club Mix)	2002	Mr. Cheeks, P. Diddy	xXx soundtrack
"That's Crazy"	2002	P. Diddy, Black Rob, Snoop Dogg, G. Dep	We Invented the Remix
"Big Spender"	2002	—N/a	Southern Hummingbird
"Wrapped Around Me" (Beyoncé Demo)	2002	Cheri Dennis	—N/a
"What's That Sound?"	2002	Angie Martinez	Animal House
"Incredible"	2002	Lady Luck	—N/a
"Incredible" (Incredible Remix)	2002	Lady Luck	No Matter What single
"Really Don't Want My Love"	2002	Ms. Jade	Girl Interrupted
"Rewind That Back"	2002	Trina	Diamond Princess
"Hurt Sumthin'"	2003	—N/a	Honey: Music from & Inspired by the Motion Picture
"Thugman"	2003	Tweet	Honey: Music from & Inspired by the Motion Picture
"E-V-E (Theme Song)"	2003	—N/a	The Opposite Sex
"One Night Stand" (Remix)	2003	E-40, Busta Rhymes	One Night Stand single
"Intro"	2003	Monica	After the Storm
"Get It Off"	2003	Monica	After the Storm
"So Gone (Remix)"	2003	Monica, Busta Rhymes, Tweet	After the Storm
"Like a Virgin/Hollywood Medley"	2003	Madonna, Christina Aguilera, Britney Spears	Remixed & Revisited
"Into the Hollywood Groove" (The Passengerz Mix)	2003	Madonna	Remixed & Revisited
"American Life" (Missy Elliott's American Dream Remix)	2003	Madonna, Tweet	"American Life" single
"Pussycat" (Remix)	2003	Janet Jackson, Lil' Kim	—N/a
"Missy Freestyle"	2003	DJ Clue?	Please Don't Throw Rocks at the Throne
"Party and Bullshit" (Remix)	2003	Rah Digga, Eve	Party & ... single
"Dilatn'"	2003	Dilated Peoples	The Alchemist Presents: Heavy Surveillance
"Sickalicious"	2003	Fabolous	Street Dreams
"(When Kim Say) Can You Hear Me Now?"	2003	Lil' Kim	La Bella Mafia
"Signs"	2003	Beyoncé	Dangerously in Love
"Crazy in Love" (Put It In Ur Mouth Remix)	2003	Beyoncé	—N/a
"Hey Woo"	2003	Loon	Loon
"Go Ahead"	2003	Karen Clark-Sheard	The Heavens Are Telling
"Wake Up Everybody"	2004	Various Artists	Wake Up Everybody
"Kiss (Live)"	2004	Alicia Keys, Gwen Stefani of No Doubt	2004 BRIT Awards
"The World Is Ours"	2004	Justin Timberlake, Timbaland, Kiley Dean, Bubba Sparxxx	The World Is Ours
"What Can I Do"	2004	Shawnna	Worth tha Weight
"Break Me Off"	2004	Petey Pablo	Still Writing in My Diary: 2nd Entry
"Whole Wide World"	2004	Petey Pablo	Still Writing in My Diary: 2nd Entry
"I Don't Wanna Party"	2004	John D.O.E.	—N/a
"Freakazoid"	2004	Blaque	Torch
"Ugly"	2004	Blaque	Torch
"Dat's Right"	2004	Blaque	Torch
"Crank Me Up"	2004	Adina Howard	The Second Coming
"Hot"	2004	Ratatat	Ratatat Remixes Vol. 1
"Wake Up"	2004	Ratatat	Ratatat Remixes Vol. 1
"Playa"	2004	Nelly, Mobb Deep	Sweat
"Spank My Ass"	2004	Blu Cantrell	From L.A. to L.O.
"Backstabbers"	2004	Jazmine Sullivan	Break My Little Heart
"Break My Little Heart"	2004	Jazmine Sullivan	Break My Little Heart
"Don't Let Me Get Started"	2004	Jazmine Sullivan	Break My Little Heart
"Feel Nice"	2004	Jazmine Sullivan	Break My Little Heart
"Where Did You Go? (Bus Stop)"	2004	Jazmine Sullivan, Tweet	Break My Little Heart
"Selfish (I Want U 2 Myself)"	2004	Fantasia, Jazmine Sullivan	Free Yourself
"Say What"	2004	Method Man	Tical 0: The Prequel
"L.O.V.E." (Missy Underground Remix)	2005	Ashlee Simpson	L.O.V.E. single
"Gotta Getcha" (Remix)	2005	Jermaine Dupri, Usher, Johntá Austin	Gotta Getcha single
"Things I Don't Mean"	2005	Tweet	It's Me Again
"Mr. DJ"	2005	Tweet	It's Me Again
"The Road to Stardom (Theme Song)"	2005	—N/a	—N/a
"Set It Off" (She's a Hustla Freestyle)	2005	DJ Khaled	This Ain't a Movie Dogg!
"Wait (The Whisper Song)" (Remix)	2005	Ying Yang Twins, Busta Rhymes, Lil Scrappy, Free, Mr. Collipark	U.S.A. (United State of Atlanta)
"Ultimate Rush"	2005	The Notorious B.I.G.	Duets: The Final Chapter
"Lift Ya Skirt"	2005	Ol' Dirty Bastard	A Son Unique
"How We Do It Over Here"	2006	Busta Rhymes	The Big Bang
"Bump What Ya Friends Say"	2006	Fantasia	Fantasia
"Turn This Party Up!"	2006	Fantasia	Fantasia
"Clap Ya Hands"	2006	Fantasia	Fantasia
"Susan MacLeod/Into the Groove" (Live)	2006	Madonna	I'm Going to Tell You a Secret
"SexyBack" (DJ Wayne Williams Ol' Skool Remix)	2006	Justin Timberlake	FutureSex/LoveSounds (Deluxe Edition)
"Take It Slow" (Remix)	2006	Shawnna	—N/a
"Get on the Bus"	2006	Raskal	Black Beauty, Vol. 12
"Not Alone"	2006	Olivia	Behind Closed Doors
"Love Me or Hate Me" (Remix)	2006	Lady Sovereign	Public Warning
"Hell Naw"	2006	So Def	—N/a
"I Like It"	2007	So Def	—N/a
"Happy Birthday"	2007	So Def, Izza Kizza	—N/a
"Bounce"	2007	Timbaland, Dr. Dre, Justin Timberlake	Shock Value
"On the Hotline" (Remix)	2007	Pretty Ricky	—N/a
"Boogie Police (Wiggle)"	2007	Omarion	—N/a
"Let It Go" (Remix)	2007	Keyshia Cole, Young Dro, T.I.	Just Like You
"Straight Jack"	2007	Chilli	Bi-Polar
"Glidin'"	2007	Chilli	Bi-Polar
"Do It" (Remix)	2007	Nelly Furtado	Do It single
"Tambourine" (Remix)	2007	Eve, Fabolous, Swizz Beatz	—N/a
"Missy Elliott Intro"	2007	Lil' Brianna	Princess of Miami
"Cherry Pop"	2007	Olivia	Show the World
"I Got a Bottle"	2008	Trina	Still da Baddest
"Big Nox (Good Shit)"	2008	Nox	—N/a
"Whatcha Think About That" (Darkchild Remix)	2008	The Pussycat Dolls, André 3000	Whatcha Think About That single
"Need U Bad" (Remix)	2008	Jazmine Sullivan, T.I.	Need U Bad single
"Walk the Dawg"	2008	Izza Kizza	Kizzaland
"The 1"	2008	Janet Jackson	Discipline
"The Girl That Rules"	2008	Ruslana	Wild Energy
"Break It Down" (Demo)	2008	Chibi	—N/a
"She's Fine"	2008	DJ Khaled, Sean Paul, Busta Rhymes	We Global
"Whisper"	2008	Jessica Betts	Jessie Pearl
"Moon"	2008	Jessica Betts	Jessie Pearl
"Fast Car"	2009	Queen Latifah	Persona
"Fast Car" (Remix)	2009	Queen Latifah, Lil' Kim	Fast Car single
"Let's Just Do It" (Remix)	2009	Lisa "Left Eye" Lopes, TLC	Eye Legacy
"I Could've Loved You"	2009	Jack Splash, Jazmine Sullivan	Technology and Love Might Save Us All...
"Freakin' You"	2009	Busta Rhymes, Ne-Yo	Back on My B.S.
"Shake N' Bake"	2009	Shaun Bless	You Don't Gotta Like My Album
"Regret" (Remix)	2009	LeToya	—N/a
"Let Me Know"	2009	Monica	Still Standing
"Everything to Me" (Remix)	2010	Monica, The Notorious B.I.G.	—N/a
"Headboard"	2010	Corté Ellis	—N/a
"The Perttiest Girl"	2010	Alja Jackson	The Perttiest Girl
"Green Light"	2010	Sharaya J	—N/a
"All Night Long"	2011	Demi Lovato, Timbaland	Unbroken
"Take Ur Clothes Off"	2011	Timbaland	Timbaland Thursdays/Textbook Timbo
"Fun" (Remix)	2011	Spice	—N/a
"Why Stop Now" (Remix)	2012	Busta Rhymes, Chris Brown, Lil Wayne	—N/a
"Bad Girls" (Switch Remix)	2012	M.I.A., Rye Rye	Bad Girls – The Remixes
"Bad Girls" (N.A.R.S. Remix)	2012	M.I.A., Azealia Banks	Bad Girls – The Remixes
"Bass"	2012	Lady Luck	The Lost Tapes
"Shout out from Missy Elliott"	2012	Shawnna	She's Alive
"Last Friday Night (T.G.I.F.)" (Remix)	2012	Katy Perry	Teenage Dream: The Complete Confection
"Mixtape"	2012	Lyrica Anderson	—N/a
"The Party Anthem"	2013	Timbaland, Lil Wayne, T-Pain	—N/a
"How You Love It"	2013	Ester Dean	Story Never Told
"Missy Elliott Intro"	2013	DJ Jayhood	Hating Is Motivation
"BANJI"	2013	Sharaya J	—N/a
"Smash Up the Place"	2013	Sharaya J	—N/a
"Snatch Yo Wigs"	2013	Sharaya J	—N/a
"Done Done"	2013	Timbaland, Sebastian	Textbook Timbo
"Wanna Be"	2013	Eve, Nacho	Lip Lock
"Just Party"	2013	Torrey Carter, VSO	Just Party single
"Niliria"	2013	G-Dragon	Coup D'Etat
"Chugalug"	2013	G-Dragon	—N/a
"Sex" (Remix)	2013	Shawnna	Sex single
"Kunty Hunty"	2013	MikeQ, Brenmar	Boiler Room: NYC Hotel Times Square
"Get Ur Freak On/Keep Me"	2014	The Black Keys	Neighbors soundtrack
"Take Ü There" (Remix)	2015	Jack Ü (Diplo, Skrillex)	Skrillex and Diplo Present Jack Ü
"That's How I'm Feelin'"	2015	Ciara, Pitbull	Jackie
"Nobody Bigger" (Remix)	2015	21:03	Nobody Bigger single
"Burnitup!"	2015	Janet Jackson	Unbreakable
"Code Red"	2015	Monica, Laiyah	Code Red
"Somebody Else Will"	2016	Tweet	Charlene
"This Is for My Girls"	2016	Zendaya, Janelle Monáe, Kelly Clarkson, Kelly Rowland, Chloe x Halle, Lea Michele, Jadagrace	This Is for My Girls single
"Strive"	2016	A$AP Ferg	Always Strive and Prosper
"Not That Kinda Girl"	2016	Fifth Harmony	7/27
"Ghostbusters (I'm Not Afraid)"	2016	Fall Out Boy	Ghostbusters: Music from the Motion Picture
"REDMERCEDES" (Remix)	2017	Aminé, AJ Tracey	—N/a
"Glow Up"	2017	Mary J. Blige, DJ Khaled	Strength of a Woman
"Get It"	2018	Busta Rhymes, Kelly Rowland	Get It single
"Borderline"	2018	Ariana Grande	Sweetener
"Level Up" (Remix)	2018	Ciara, Fatman Scoop	Level Up single
"This Is Me (The Reimagined Remix)"	2018	Keala Settle, Kesha	The Greatest Showman: Reimagined
"Don't Judge Me"	2019	Kierra Sheard	Don't Judge Me single
"Move Like a Snake" (Remix)	2020	Kayla Nicole	Move Like a Snake single
"Boomin'"	2020	Teyana Taylor, Future	The Album
"My Own Drum" (Remix)	2021	Ynairaly Simo	Vivo soundtrack
"NAILS" (Remix)	2022	Noga Erez	NAILS single
"Told Ya"	2023	Chlöe Bailey	In Pieces
"Last One Left"	2023	Brent Faiyaz, Lil Gray	Larger than Life

== Music videos ==
List of music videos, with directors, showing year released
Title	Year	Director(s)
"The Rain (Supa Dupa Fly)"	1997	Hype Williams
"Sock It 2 Me" (featuring Da Brat and Lil' Kim)	1997	Hype Williams
"Beep Me 911" (featuring 702 and Magoo)	1998	Earle Sebastian
"Hit Em wit da Hee" (featuring Mocha)	1998	Paul Hunter
"She's a Bitch"	1999	Hype Williams
"All n My Grill" (featuring Nicole Wray and Big Boi of OutKast)	1999	Hype Williams
"Hot Boyz" (featuring Lil' Mo, Nas and Eve)	1999	Hype Williams
"Get Ur Freak On"	2001	Dave Meyers
"One Minute Man" (featuring Ludacris and Trina)	2001	Dave Meyers
"Take Away/4 My People" (featuring Ginuwine and introducing Tweet)	2001	Dave Meyers
"Work It"	2002	Dave Meyers, Missy Elliott
"Gossip Folks" (featuring Ludacris)	2003	Dave Meyers
"Pass That Dutch"	2003	Dave Meyers
"I'm Really Hot"	2004	Bryan Barber
"Lose Control" (featuring Ciara and Fatman Scoop)	2005	Dave Meyers
"Teary Eyed"	2005	Antti J, Missy Elliott
"We Run This"	2006	Dave Meyers
"Ching-a-Ling/Shake Your Pom Pom"	2008	Dave Meyers
"WTF (Where They From)" (featuring Pharrell Williams)	2015	Dave Meyers
"I'm Better" (featuring Lamb)	2017	Dave Meyers
"Throw It Back"	2019	Daniel Russell
"Cool Off"	2020	Daniel Russell
