= Cool Off =

Cool Off may refer to:

- "Cool Off", a song by Wale from his 2012 mixtape Folarin
- "Cool Off", a song by Missy Elliott from her 2019 EP Iconology
