= Do Thangz =

Single by Men of Vizion featuring Missy Elliott

from the album Personal
- Released: October 8, 1996
- Recorded: 1996
- Studio: Future Recording Studios (Virginia Beach, Virginia)
- Genre: R&B; hip hop
- Label: MJJ; 550 Music; Epic; Sony
- Songwriters: Lil' C. Smith; M. Smith; S. Blair; T. Riley; M. Elliott
- Producers: Rodney "Darkchild" Jerkins; Teddy Riley

Men of Vizion singles chronology
| "House Keeper" (1996) | "Do Thangz" (1996) | "Do You Feel Me (...Freak You)" (1999) |

Missy Elliott singles chronology
| "Steelo" (1996) | "Do Thangz" (1996) | "You Don't Have to Worry" (1996) |

"Do Thangz" is a song by American R&B quintet Men of Vizion. It was the second single from the group's debut album Personal (1996) and was released as the "Main Pass Remix" (alternatively titled "A Dark Child remix") featuring guest vocals by Missy Elliott and production by Rodney "Darkchild" Jerkins; three months earlier, Jerkins coincidentally produced the Gina Thompson single "The Things You Do (Remix)", which served as Elliott's breakout moment with her guest rap vocals.

The single was executive produced by the group's mentor, Michael Jackson; additionally, the remix is noted for its sampling of MC Shan's "The Bridge".

== Music video ==
A music video for the remixed single was directed by Lionel C. Martin and premiered on BET in early October 1996. It opens with Missy Elliott performing her rap while doing her infamous slide-dance move on a pavement outside of a barbershop. The scene then intercuts with Men of Vizion performing their vocals while walking down a street and dancing with Missy.

== Track listings ==
12"/CD single

1. "Do Thangz" (Main Pass Remix) (featuring Missy Elliott) — 4:36
2. "Do Thangz" (Main Pass W/O Rap) — 4:32
3. "Do Thangz" (LP Version) (featuring Nutta Butta) — 5:01
4. "Do Thangz" (Instrumental Remix) — 4:29
5. "Do Thangz" (Beat Mix) — 4:36
6. "Do Thangz" (Acappella) — 4:32

== Charts ==
In late October 1996, the song debuted on Billboard R&B Singles at #63 and would later peak at #53 the following week.

| Chart (1996) | Peak position |
|---|---|
| US Billboard Hot R&B Singles | 53 |
