= MOV (album) =

Men of Vizion

Studio album by Men of Vizion
- Released: May 4, 1999
- Recorded: 1998
- Genre: R&B, soul, new jack swing
- Length: 60:09
- Label: MJJ Music, The WORK Group
- Producer: Jazze Pha, Kenneth "K-Fam" Fambro, Spanky Williams, Fred Jerkins III, Joe, Teddy Bishop, Teddy Riley, Marti Sharron & Danny Sembello, Calvin Gaines & Mark J. Wilson

Men of Vizion chronology
Personal (1996)	Men of Vizion (1999)

Singles from MOV
- 1. ""Do You Feel Me (...Freak You)"" Released: 1999; 2. ""Break Me Off"" Released: March 1999

Professional ratings
Review scores
Source	Rating
AllMusic	3/5 stars

MOV (also titled Men of Vizion) is the second album by R&B group Men of Vizion released by MJJ Music on May 4, 1999. The album had a noticeable change in sound as producer Teddy Riley was mostly absent from this album, save for the song "I Need Love". MOV is also noticeable for being their first album with an all new line-up as original members Brian DeRamus, Corley Randolph and Desmond T. Greggs would depart from the group. They were replaced by Michael Best, DeWayne Jones and Anthony Fuller- formerly of the early 1990s quintet Riff.

They worked with producer Fred Jerkins III (brother of producer Rodney Jerkins) on MOV, who produced the first single "Do You Feel Me (...Freak You)". The song also appears in remix form as a ballad under the title "If I Told You". This album is notable for the song "Miracles", which was one of the final songs penned by singer-songwriter Kenny Greene before his passing in 2001.

== Track listing ==
1. "I Think About It" (George Spencer III, Prathan Nathaniel Williams, Kenneth Fambro, Phalon Alexander) (3:56)
2. "I Like It Like That" (Prathan Nathaniel Williams) (4:14)
3. "Hiding Place (Interlude)" (Prathan Nathaniel Williams, George Spencer III, Michael Best, Dewayne Jones) (0:41)
4. "Real Love" (Prathan Nathaniel Williams, George Spencer III, Michael Best, Dewayne Jones, Anthony Fuller, Kenneth Fambro) (4:13)
5. "Do You Feel Me? (...Freak You)" (featuring Mr. Cheeks) (Fred Jerkins III, LaShawn Daniels, Prathan Nathaniel Williams, George Spencer III, Anthony Fuller, Rodney Jerkins) (5:16)
6. "Break Me Off (Love Theme from Trippin') (Joe Thomas, Joshua P. Thompson) (4:34)
7. "All Night Long" (Prathan Nathaniel Williams, George Spencer III, Ronald Isley, Rudolph Isley, O'Kelly Isley, Marvin Isley, Ernie Isley, Chris Jasper) (5:35)
8. "If I Told You" (Fred Jerkins III, LaShawn Daniels, Prathan Nathaniel Williams, George Spencer III, Anthony Fuller, Rodney Jerkins) (5:31)
9. "If This Is Love Again" (Gordon Chambers, Teddy Bishop) (4:33)
10. "The Rain" (Prathan Nathaniel Williams, M. Dickerson, Kenneth Fambro) (3:42)
11. "I Need Love" (Prathan Nathaniel Williams, Teddy Riley) (4:35)
12. "Right Thing at the Wrong Time" (Marti Sharron, Danny Sembello) (5:06)
13. "Miracles" (Kenny Greene, Calvin Gaines, Mark J. Wilson, Vincent Herbert, Sydney Joseph) (5:14)
14. "Yes" (Prathan Nathaniel Williams) (2:59)

== Personnel ==
- Herb Powers - mastering
- Teddy Riley, Jerry Greenberg, Sydney "JR" Joseph, Ken Komisar - executive producer
- Kwaku Alston - photography
