= Gina Thompson =

American R&B singer (born 1976)

- Born: Lugenia Thompson; November 10, 1976 (age 49)
- Origin: Vineland, New Jersey, U.S.
- Genres: R&B, hip hop soul
- Occupations: Singer, songwriter
- Years active: 1996–present
- Labels: Mercury, Goldmind, Elektra, Maljo

Gina Thompson (born Lugenia Thompson; November 10, 1976) is an American R&B singer. Born to Edward L. Thompson, Sr. and Eugenia Thompson, Gina Thompson began singing at an early age and was signed to her first recording contract with Mercury Records shortly after graduating from high school.

== Recording career ==
Nobody Does It Better was Gina Thompson's first album. Released in 1996, it featured production by Missy Elliott and Diddy, and featured appearances by Elliott, Diddy, and Craig Mack, among others. Her first single from the album, "The Things That You Do", was a success, peaking at number 41 on the Billboard Hot 100 charts, and number 12 on Billboard's Hot R&B/Hip-Hop Singles & Tracks chart. Her song, "You Bring the Sunshine", was produced by John jon and was included on the NBA @ 50 compilation album as the lead single. It peaked at number 53 on the Hot 100.

Also in 1996, Thompson performed background vocals for the song "Cold Rock A Party" by MC Lyte featuring Missy Elliott and Puff Daddy. She also appeared on Lyte's 1998 album Seven & Seven, on the track 'It's All Yours". Later work included "Why Do Fools Fall in Love", a re-imagining of the 1955 Frankie Lymon & the Teenagers hit of the same name. Thompson's "Why Do Fools Fall in Love," featuring Missy Elliott and rapper Mocha, was featured in the 1998 Lymon biopic Why Do Fools Fall in Love and its soundtrack. By the latter part of 1998, Thompson's debut album was certified Platinum by the RIAA after an estimate of one million copies of the album were sold.

In 1999, the singer had appeared on Missy Elliott's second album, Da Real World. Thompson's second album, If You Only Knew, was set to be released on September 21, 1999 on Elektra Records through Missy Elliott's The Goldmind Inc. imprint. Two singles were released in advance of the album's anticipated release date: "Ya Di Ya", featuring Elliott, peaked at number 38 on the R&B chart, while "Caught Up", featuring rapper Beanie Sigel, failed to chart. The album was shelved, and Thompson asked to be released from her contract. Thompson continued to perform as an independent artist, and began work on a third album in 2008.

On July 28, 2008, Gina Thompson released a song "We Don't Talk No More (Dancehall Remix)" as the lead single for her official third studio album, Missing You. On February 23, 2009, Thompson released the album through Blue Mountain Records/Sunset Urban Records; the album was released as a digital download on online markets, while physical copies of the album were released through Amazon. Due to lack of charting performance and no promotion provided for the album, Thompson was dropped from the label.

During the summer of 2023, Thompson attempted another comeback by assembling another recording; the promo single "Starving", which was released to streaming and digital downloading platforms circa August 2023.

== Discography ==
=== Albums ===
- 1996: Nobody Does It Better
- 1999: If You Only Knew
- 2009: Missing You

=== Singles ===
- 1996: "The Things That You Do" (#41 US, #12 US R&B)
- 1997: "You Bring the Sunshine" (#53 US)
- 1998: "It's All Yours" (MC Lyte featuring Gina Thompson)
- 1999: "Ya Di Ya" (featuring Missy Elliott) (#124 US, #38 US R&B)
- 1999: "Caught Up" (featuring Beanie Sigel)
- 2008: "We Don't Talk No More (Dancehall Remix)"
- 2023: "Starving"

== See also ==
- Missy Elliott
- The Goldmind Inc.
