= Take That (Torrey Carter song) =

Single by Torrey Carter featuring Missy Elliott

from the album The Life I Live
- Released: June 6, 2000
- Recorded: Quad Studios (New York City, New York)
- Genre: R&B; Hip hop
- Length: 3:48 (amended version)
- Label: Elektra; EastWest; Goldmind, Inc.
- Songwriters: Missy Elliott; Howard Hewett; Dana L. Meyers
- Producers: Charlemagne; Missy Elliott

Torrey Carter singles chronology
"Take That" (2000)	"Rebirth" (2012)

Missy Elliott singles chronology
"Hot Boyz" (1999)	"Take That" (2000)	"Is That Your Chick (The Lost Verses)" (2000)

"Take That" is the debut single by American R&B singer, Torrey Carter. It features guest vocals by Carter's former mentor Missy "Misdemeanor" Elliott and was released as the lead single from Carter's unreleased debut album, The Life I Live (2000).

== Background ==
Shortly after performing for Missy Elliott in 1998 in New York's Greenwich Village, Torrey Carter landed a contract deal with Elliott's label The Goldmind and became the first male artist to sign to the label. Carter began work on his debut The Life I Live in 1999 and was able to release "Take That" as the debut's lead single the following year. While the song became a minor hit on the Billboard R&B/Hip-Hop charts, Elektra Records disapproved of its urban charting performance and had "hoped" for more stronger pop-oriented success on the Billboard Hot 100.

Displeased, Elektra shelved Carter's debut album and dropped him from their roster. In a late 2001 interview with Billboard, Missy Elliott stated that she was disappointed in Elektra for shelving Carter. Elliott noted that sometimes there would be disputes between her and Elektra due to the complications surrounding promotion for her brand of artists under her label The Goldmind Inc. Elliott added that it was very conflicting because she had her artists and Elektra had theirs; thus "Elektra [of course]" had to put their artists "forth first."

== Music video ==
A Nzingha Stewart-directed music video for the single premiered in early May 2000 on BET. The video takes place in an underground sewer and begins with Missy Elliott sitting on a floating car seat while rapping her adlibs. Next, Torrey Carter is seen driving a Jeep from two differing angles; one being from the driver side, the other being the passenger side. Carter is then shown singing more of his verses while dancing with accompanying female dancers dressed in glittered jumpsuits. Missy Elliott is later shown in the latter of the video with Timbaland in a convertible.

== Track listings and formats ==
CD single

1. "Take That" (Amended Version)
2. "Take That" (Instrumental)
3. "Floss Ya Jewels" (Snippet)
4. "Shotgun" (Snippet)
5. "If It's Money That You Want" (Snippet)

12" Vinyl

1. "Take That" (Original Version)
2. "Take That" (Amended Version)
3. "Take That" (Instrumental)
4. "Take That" (Acapella)
5. "If It's Money That You Want" (Snippet)

== Chart performance ==
Chart (2000)	Peak position
US Billboard Hot 100	87
US Billboard Hot R&B/Hip-Hop Singles & Tracks	14
