= House Keeper (song) =

1996 single by Men of Vizion

Single by Men of Vizion

from the album Personal
- Released: April 9, 1996
- Recorded: 1995
- Genre: R&B
- Length: 4:32 (album version); 3:45 (single edit)
- Label: MJJ Music
- Songwriters: George Spencer III; Teddy Riley; Sherri Blair
- Producer: Teddy Riley

Men of Vizion singles chronology
| "House Keeper" (1996) | "Do Thangz" (1996) |

Music video
- "House Keeper" on YouTube

"House Keeper" is the debut single by American R&B group Men of Vizion, released in April 1996 by MJJ Music, from their debut studio album, Personal (1996). Co-written by group member George Spencer III and produced by Teddy Riley, the song was the group's only appearance on the US Billboard Hot 100 and Cash Box Top 100 charts, peaking at No. 67 and 66. The accompanying music video was directed by Jesse Vaughan.

== Charts ==
| Chart (1996) | Peak position |
|---|---|
| US Billboard Hot 100 | 67 |
| US Hot R&B/Hip-Hop Singles & Tracks (Billboard) | 13 |
| US Cash Box Top 100 | 66 |
