= Cori Yarckin =

American singer

- Born: August 15, 1982 (age 44); Seaford, Delaware, U.S.
- Origin: Orlando, Florida, U.S.
- Genres: Rock; Alternative rock Pop rock
- Website: coriyarckin.com

Cori Ann Yarckin (born August 15, 1982), is an American actress and singer from Orlando, Florida.

== Early life ==
Yarckin was born in Seaford, Delaware and raised in Orlando, Florida. She went to West Orange High School, before attending the University of Central Florida. She was a performer since elementary school. She was a dancer on the Disney Channel. She trained at the Broadway Theater Project studying dance with Gregory Hines and Ann Reinking.

== Career ==
She played Camille on the Nickelodeon TV series Noah Knows Best. She took part in the nationally televised UPN reality/talent show The Road to Stardom with Missy Elliott in 2005.

In a 2006 Rolling Stones feature titled Girls of MySpace, Kevin O'Donnell wrote Yarckin "belts out confessional pop-punk songs inspired by teen faves such as Ashlee Simpson and Avril Lavigne. Angst has never sounded sexier." At the time, she had 163,154 MySpace friends.

Yarckin has been the in-arena host for the Orlando Magic basketball team since 2013, and has also presented Channel 5's NFL End Zone since 2021.
