= Brianna Perry =

American rapper and actress (born 1992)

- Perry in 2015

Background information
- Born: January 11, 1992 (age 34)
- Origin: Miami-Dade, Florida, U.S.
- Genres: Hip hop; trap
- Occupations: Rapper; singer; actress
- Years active: 2002–present
- Labels: Diva Enterprises; International Music Group; The Goldmind Inc.; Atlantic; Poe Boy
- Spinoff of: Missy Elliott

Brianna Perry (born January 11, 1992), also known as Lil' Brianna, is an American rapper and actress from Miami-Dade County, Florida. She was the youngest act signed to Missy Elliott's label The Goldmind Inc. Perry made her debut on Trina's album Diamond Princess (2002) on the track "Kandi". Since then, she has released several mixtapes and starred as a regular cast-member on the reality-television series Sisterhood of Hip Hop. In 2016, Brianna left major label Atlantic Records due to low promotion and moved forward with her indie label Poe Boy Entertainment.

== Music career ==
=== Career beginnings ===
At the age of 7, under the supervision of her uncles, Brianna Perry made her first recording at the Poe Boy Music Group studios. Her frequent visits to the studio would accumulate the attention of rappers Trina and Trick Daddy, the former who would grant Perry a recording deal with Diva Records (Diva Enterprises/DP Entertainment). From there, Perry guest starred on BET's Rap City and made her rapping debut on Trina's Diamond Princess on the track "Kandi", which would attract the attention of Missy Elliott. Elliott would go on to sign Perry to her label, The Goldmind Inc., and feature the young rapper in various promotional concerts with her and Timbaland. Additionally, Perry would also make cameo appearances in a few of Elliott's work such as the music video to "Pass That Dutch" and her short-lived reality series, The Road to Stardom with Missy Elliott. In between cameo work, Perry would work extensively on an untitled debut album which tentatively comprised forty tracks and sole production from Elliott and Timbaland; however, the project was never released. In 2006, due to creative differences, Perry parted ways with Elliott on good terms.

In 2007, Perry readied a mixtape, Princess of Miami, with Slip-N-Slide recording affiliates and former mentor Missy Elliott. In 2008, Perry announced work on a debut album tentatively titled Girl Talk, alongside a film project with Malcolm in the Middle actor Frankie Muniz, however neither project was released. In 2009, Perry was shuffled to Flo Rida's label International Music Group, where she materialized a mixtape, The Graduation, and an underground single, "Boom Shacka", that failed to serve as a commercial release.

=== 2011–present: Atlantic and Sisterhood of Hip Hop ===
In 2011, Perry departed from Flo Rida's camp and went on to do further work with longtime family label, Poe Boy Music Group. That same year, Perry released the single, "Fly Kicks", alongside an accompanying music video. Its visual premiere on BET's 106 & Park would earn her a contract deal with Atlantic Records, and accumulate enough buzz to compose the mixtape Face Off. On December 20, 2011, Perry released the single "Marilyn Monroe", which featured production by frequent Missy Elliott co-producer, Cainon Lamb. The song would generally meet favorable reception from musical peers like Beyoncé, who featured the song on her official website. In 2012, Perry collaborated with SWV ("Do Ya"), Pusha T ("Red Cup"), and Victoria Monet ("Hate Ya Past"); the latter being featured on Perry's mixtape, Symphony No. 9: The B Collection. Additionally, Perry would go on to collaborate with Trina on a visual titled "Girl Talk".

In June 2014, Perry starred as a regular cast-member for the Oxygen reality series Sisterhood of Hip Hop, where a portion of her promotional material ("I'm That B.I.T.C.H.", "Since U Left") was previewed via various episodes. In 2016 she released T.O.B (Them Other Bitches)” that featured her co-star Lee Mazin, while she also featured in a series featuring Live Squad. In August 2016 she released the single Something To Live For that featured Stacy Barthe.

== Personal life ==
Aside from her music career, Perry enrolled in University of Miami as a business major. In May 2014, Perry graduated from the University. Perry married Khalil Mack in 2016 and they have two sons together.

== Discography ==
=== Mixtapes ===
- 2003: Candy Girl (hosted by Rick Ross)
- 2007: Princess of Miami
- 2009: The Graduation
- 2011: Face Off
- 2012: Symphony No. 9
- 2013: Symphony No. 9: The B Collection

=== Singles ===
- 2009: "Duh!"
- 2010: "Boom Shacka" (featuring Flo Rida)
- 2011: "Fly Kicks"
- 2011: "Marilyn Monroe"
- 2013: "Hate Ya Past" (featuring Victoria Monet)
- 2014: "I'm That B.I.T.C.H."
- 2014: "Since U Left" (featuring Taylor Parks)
- 2017: "Get It Girl" (featuring Rick Ross)

=== Guest appearances ===
List of guest appearances, with other performing artists, showing year released and album name
Title	Year	Other performer(s)	Album
"Kandi"	2002	Trina	Diamond Princess
"Say Aah (Ladies Remix)"	2009	Trina, Shonie	—N/a
"Beautiful Body"	2011	Trina	Diamonds Are Forever
"Let It Burn"	2011	Flo Rida	—N/a
"Do Ya"	2012	SWV	I Missed Us
"Supa Bad"	2012	Trina	Back 2 Business

== Filmography ==
- 2002: Rap City
- 2005: The Road to Stardom with Missy Elliott
- 2014–2016: Sisterhood of Hip Hop
- 2018—present: Love & Hip Hop: Miami

== Awards and nominations ==
- BET Awards
  - 2012: Best Female Hip-Hop Artist – (Nominated)
