= She's a Bitch =

Single by Missy Elliott

from the album Da Real World
- Released: April 20, 1999
- Studio: Master Sound Studios (Virginia Beach, Virginia)
- Genre: Pop rap
- Length: 3:59
- Label: Goldmind; Elektra
- Songwriters: Missy Elliott; Timothy Mosley
- Producer: Timbaland

Missy Elliott singles chronology
"I Like Control" (1999)	"She's a Bitch" (1999)	"All n My Grill" (1999)

Music video
- "She's a Bitch" on YouTube

"She's a Bitch" is a song by American rapper Missy "Misdemeanor" Elliott. It was written by Elliott and Timbaland for her second album, Da Real World (1999), while production was helmed by the latter. The song was released by The Goldmind Inc. and Elektra Records as the album's lead single in April 1999.

Despite an expensive music video directed by video director Hype Williams, the song peaked only at number 90 on the U.S. Billboard Hot 100, with Da Real World's other singles "All n My Grill" and "Hot Boyz" going on to greater chart success. Elliott performed the song live on a number of occasions, including the 2017 VH1 Hip Hop Honors: The '90s Game Changers.

== Lyrics and production ==
Speaking to Interview in 1999, Missy Elliott explained how she wished to highlight the double standard of using "bitch" to pejoratively denigrate certain behaviors in women, but not in men, arguing that "you don’t hear people call males bitches":

Music is a male-dominated field. Women are not always taken as seriously as we should be, so sometimes we have to put our foot down. To other people that may come across as being a bitch, but it's just knowing what we want and being confident. If I'm paying people and they're not handling my business right, I have to check them. 'Cause sometimes you're nice and people don't jump on what they're supposed to do, but if you go in there screaming at everybody—"Look, why aren't my posters up?" or "Why wasn't my single out on this day?"—then they jump right on it.

— Missy Elliott, describing the message behind "She's a Bitch" to Interview in 1999

Keith Farley of AllMusic wrote that Missy Elliott "reappropriates the insult to refer to strong females", considering it "the best example" of her "satirical nods to other clichéd notions of hip-hop" present throughout Da Real World. Timbaland's production contains influences of electro, with Charles Aaron of Spin characterising it as "firing short bursts of sound around Missy's short bursts of bitchery" as an "808 drum machine implodes in your face" during the breakdown.

== Critical reception ==
Writing for Rolling Stone, music journalist Touré praised "She's a Bitch" as "a furiously celebratory, slyly feminist anthem that reclaims an oppressive word, shattering its power to offend while burning down the clubs with a blazing beat and her roaring flow". By contrast, in an otherwise positive review of Da Real World, David Browne of Entertainment Weekly dismissed "She's a Bitch" as "one of the album’s most unremarkable and most cluttered tracks", criticising its selection as the lead single.

Stereogum and Paste ranked the song number ten and number nine, respectively, on their lists of the 10 greatest Missy Elliott Songs.

== Music video ==
The "She's a Bitch" video was directed by Hype Williams on May 1, 1999; similar to his other clips for Elliott, Williams makes extensive use of unique effects, costuming, and sets. Highlights of the video include Elliott and her dancers being raised from underwater on a giant hydraulic "M", and also a complete set made from electroluminescent lighting.

== Sampling ==
- In 2017, Ski Mask the Slump God released a remix of the song titled "Catch Me Outside".
- In 2023, Bia released a single titled "I'm That Bitch" which heavily samples the original song, but this time in a fast paced drill beat, with Timbaland being credited as a lead artist among her.
- In 2024, Cardi B released a freestyle of the song titled "Like What (Freestyle)".

== Track listings ==
All tracks written by Melissa Elliott and Timothy Mosley; produced by Timbaland and co-produced by Elliott.

US/UK 12-inch promo
No.	Title	Length
1.	"She's a Bitch" (clean version)	3:27
2.	"She's a Bitch" (radio edit)	3:27
3.	"She's a Bitch" (ínstrumental)	4:00
4.	"She's a Bitch" (acapella)	3:48

Maxi/CD single
No.	Title	Length
1.	"She's a Bitch" (clean version)	3:27
2.	"She's a Bitch" (radio edit)	3:27
3.	"She's a Bitch" (ínstrumental)	4:00

== Credits and personnel ==
Credits lifted from the liner notes of Da Real World.

- Drew Coleman – assistant engineer
- Jimmy Douglass – engineer, mixing
- Missy "Misdemeanor" Elliott – co-producer, mixing, vocals, writer
- Darren S. Moore – assistant mixing engineer
- Timbaland – producer, vocals, writer

== Charts ==
Weekly chart performance for "She's a Bitch"
Chart (1999)	Peak position
Australia (ARIA)	70
Germany (GfK)	84
Netherlands (Dutch Top 40 Tipparade)	6
Netherlands (Single Top 100)	53
New Zealand (Recorded Music NZ)	26
US Billboard Hot 100	90
US Hot R&B/Hip-Hop Songs (Billboard)	30
