= Personal (Men of Vizion album) =

Studio album by Men of Vizion
- Released: June 18, 1996
- Recorded: 1995–96; Future Recording Studios (Virginia Beach)
- Genres: R&B, new jack swing
- Length: 64:58
- Labels: MJJ, 550, Epic
- Producers: Rodney Jerkins, Gene Peoples, Alexander Richbourg, Teddy Riley (also exec.), Chris "Lil" Smith, Prathan Nathaniel "Spanky" Williams, Jerry Greenberg (exec.), Michael Jackson (exec.), Sydney "J.R." Joseph (exec.)

Men of Vizion chronology
Personal (1996)	MOV (1999)

Singles from Personal
- 1. "House Keeper" Released: April 9, 1996; 2. "Do Thangz" Released: October 8, 1996

Personal is the debut studio album by the American vocal group Men of Vizion. It was released on June 18, 1996, via Michael Jackson's record label, MJJ Music, after a demo tape was played to him by producer Teddy Riley. The album has been described as a "sumptuous blend" of vocal R&B and "90s production techniques", that alternates between smooth ballads and new jack swing.

Personal received mixed reviews from music critics, with some critics noting similarities between the group and Boyz II Men. Some critics felt as if the material was unmemorable versions of Boyz II Men songs, while others felt that Personal was highly different from the music at the time. The album only managed to chart in the United States, where it peaked at 14 on the Billboard Heatseekers Albums, 29 on the Billboard R&B Albums and 186 on the Billboard Top 200. Two singles were released to promote the album: "House Keeper" and "Do Thangz". The former was a commercial success, peaking at number 13 on the U.S. Billboard Hot R&B/Hip-Hop Singles & Tracks and at 67 on the U.S. Billboard Hot 100.

== Development and composition ==
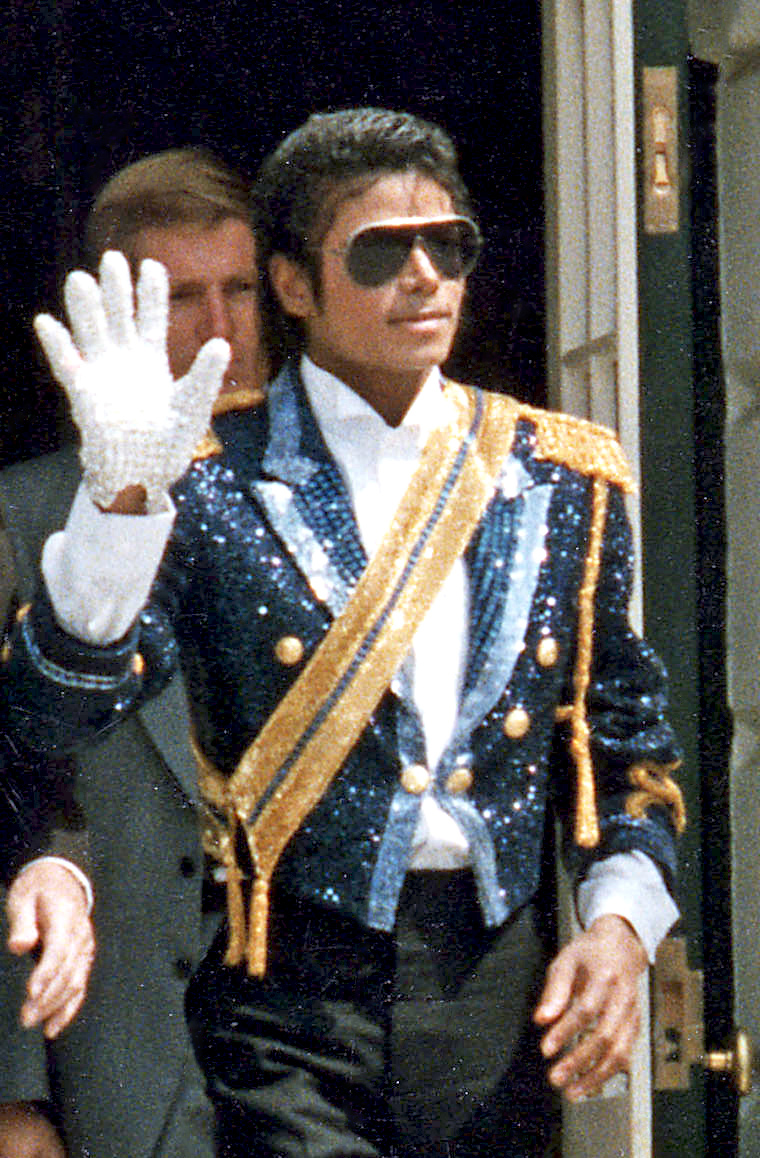
Michael Jackson signed the group to his record label, MJJ Music, after a demo tape was played to him by producer Teddy Riley in 1993.

Composed of George Spencer III, Corley Randolph, Desmond T. Greggs, Brian L. DeRamus and Prathan "Spanky" Williams, Men of Vizion were formed in the early 1990s in Brooklyn, New York. Their vocal R&B harmonies impressed American entertainer Michael Jackson, who signed the group to his record label, MJJ Music, after a demo tape was played to him by producer Teddy Riley in 1993. Greggs told Billboard magazine that the band is "here to prove that intimate songwriting in R&B is coming back". He concluded by stating that the band was writing songs "that everyone will understand".

== Release and promotion ==
Originally set for release on May 14, 1996, Personal was released by MJJ Music, 550 Music and Epic Records on June 18. The album debuted at 186 on the Billboard Top 200 for the chart issued on July 6. It exited the chart the following week, to re-enter at the same position for the chart issued on July 20. The album spent a total of four weeks in the chart, before its exit on the week of August 10. Personal debuted at its peak position of 29 on the U.S. Billboard R&B Albums on the chart issued on July 6. Spending a total of ten weeks on the R&B Albums chart, the album received its final position of 87 on the chart issued on September 7. Personal debuted at 14 on U.S. Billboard Heatseekers Album chart on the chart issued on July 6. It dropped to 16 in the following week, before moving back to the 14th position on July 20, where it stayed for a second week. The album exited the Heatseekers Album chart on the week of September 7, spending a total of nine weeks on it.

"House Keeper" was released as the lead single from the album on April 9, 1996. To promote the single, tying in with the song's lyric play on reversed gender roles, the group performed track dates at "ladies only" functions. The trek was sponsored by major-market radio stations. The song peaked at number 13 on the U.S. Billboard Hot R&B/Hip-Hop Singles & Tracks and at 67 on the U.S. Billboard Hot 100. An accompanying music video for "House Keeper" was directed by Jesse Vaughan. "Do Thangz" was released as the second, and final, single from the album on October 8, 1996. It peaked at number 53 on the U.S. Billboard Hot R&B/Hip-Hop Singles & Tracks. An accompanying music video for the song was directed by Lionel C. Martin.

== Critical reception ==
Professional ratings
Review scores
Source	Rating
AllMusic	2.5/5 stars

Darryl Scipio of Vibe stated unlike "today's masculine R&B" that is "laden with jokers who sing of little but freekin' girls—and then of keeping it on the down-low", Personal doesn't use "wordy descriptions of sex to get you in the mood to dance". Scipio stated that all 12 songs on the album feature "tight, bouncy production" and that all the members of the group sing confidently; "there are no weak vocals here". He cited "House Keeper" and "Personal" as having the most soul, "but the rest stand solidly". He concluded his review of the album by stating that: "These visionaries are definitely a sound for sore ears". Stephen Thomas Erlewine of AllMusic compared the group and the musical style of Personal to that of Boyz II Men. Erlewine stated that where Boyz II Men have first-rate professional songwriters and producers, Men of Vizion merely have "competent hacks", which means that "no matter how hard the group tries, they can't make any of these songs memorable". Jai Henry of The Daily Cougar commented that although at times they sound "a little too much" like Blackstreet, Men of Vizion "definitely have their own sound".

Jean A. Williams of the Chicago Sun-Times remarked that while the group demonstrates "good, strong and genuine vocal ability" on the album, what they need is "something to set them apart from the proliferation of male harmony groups of the R&B/soul persuasion". Williams complimented the group's cover of "Show You the Way to Go" as a "nice effort" but called "House Keeper" derivative. Ray Marcano of the Dayton Daily News wrote that the album's ballads - especially "That's Alright" and "When You Need Someone" - have "terrific melodies and wonderful hooks that will easily keep listeners' attention". Marcano was, however, critical of the group's indistinct harmonies and said their vocals need to be "a bit sharper". Jerome Cannon of the Chattanooga Times Free Press complimented Men of Vizion's harmonies on "It's Alright" and said that what caught his attention about the album was that the group were "not caught up in what every other new male group is trying to do, and that is to imitate Boyz II Men".

== Track listing ==
1. "That's Alright" (Prathan Williams) – 5:35
2. "Instant Love" (Teddy Riley, Prathan Williams, Chauncey Hannibal, Rodney Jerkins) – 5:41
3. "House Keeper" (Teddy Riley, Sherri Blair, George Spencer III) – 4:33
4. "When You Need Someone" (Prathan Williams) – 6:47
5. "Forgive Me" (Prathan Williams) – 5:44
6. "Personal" (Bob Kirschner, Yemi Babatunde, Prathan Williams, Sydney Joseph Jr.) – 6:33
7. "Joyride" featuring Tasha Scott (Alexander Richbourg) – 4:30
8. "You Told Me You Loved Me" (Prathan Williams, Bob Kirschner, Yemi Babatunde) – 5:47
9. "Do Thangz" (Teddy Riley, Sherri Blair, Chris Smith, Menton Smith) – 5:02
10. "Show You the Way to Go" (Kenny Gamble, Leon Huff) – 5:28
11. "It's Only Just a Dream" (Teddy Riley, Sherri Blair, Prathan Williams, George Spencer III, Corley Randolph) – 4:44
12. "Night and Day" (Teddy Riley, Corley Randolph, Desmond Greggs, Leon Sylvers IV) – 4:34

== Charts ==
Chart (1996)	Peak position
U.S. Billboard Heatseekers Albums	14
U.S. Billboard R&B Albums	29
U.S. Billboard Top 200	186

== Personnel ==
Credits for Personal adapted from AllMusic.

- Brian DeRamus – vocals
- Kenneth Gamble – composer
- Serban Ghenea – engineer, mixing
- Franklyn Grant – remixing
- Desmond Greggs – composer
- Gene Griffin – remixing
- John Hanes – engineer, mixing
- Chauncey Hannibal – composer
- Leon Huff – composer
- Rodney Jerkins – producer
- Sydney "J.R." Joseph – mixing, remixing
- George Mayers – engineer, mixing
- Men of Vizion – Primary artist, producer, vocals (background)
- Nutta Butta – Guest artist, vocals
- Gene Peoples – producer
- Alexander Richbourg – composer, producer
- Teddy Riley – engineer, mixing, producer
- Tasha Scott – Featured artist, Guest artist, vocals
- Chris "Lil" Smith – producer
- Menton L. Smith – composer
- George Spencer – vocals
- Leon F. Sylvers III – composer
- Prathan "Spanky" Williams – Assistant engineer, composer, engineer, mixing, producer, vocals
- Sprague Williams – Assistant engineer
