= Nobody Does It Better (album) =

Studio album by Gina Thompson
- Released: August 13, 1996
- Length: 61:53
- Label: Mercury
- Producers: Sean "Puffy" Combs; Fred Jerkins III; Rodney "Darkchild" Jerkins; Aaron Washington

Gina Thompson chronology
Nobody Does It Better (1996)	If You Only Knew (1999)

Singles from Nobody Does It Better
- 1. "The Things That You Do (Bad Boy Remix)" Released: July 16, 1996

Nobody Does It Better is the debut studio album by American singer Gina Thompson. It was released by Mercury Records on August 13, 1996. Chiefly produced by Rodney "Darkchild" Jerkins, the debut album peaked at 36 on the US Top R&B/Hip-Hop Albums chart. Nobody Does It Better was led by the hit single, "The Things That You Do". The Bad Boy Remix of the song, produced by Sean "Puffy" Combs and featuring rapper Missy Elliott, was released as the official lead single and peaked at number 12 on the US Hot R&B/Hip-Hop Songs chart.

== Critical reception ==
Professional ratings
Review scores
Source	Rating
AllMusic	3/5 stars

AllMusic rated the album three out of five stars.

== Track listing ==
Nobody Does It Better track listing
No.	Title	Writer(s)	Producer(s)	Length
1.	"Rodalude"	Rodney Jerkins	R. Jerkins	2:00
2.	"The Things That You Do"	R. Jerkins	R. Jerkins	4:36
3.	"Nobody Does It Better"	R. Jerkins; Fred Jerkins III	R. Jerkins	4:25
4.	"Can't Go Another Minute"	Aaron Washington; Joseph Stonestreet; R. Jerkins; Victor Williamson	R. Jerkins; Washington	4:59
5.	"Angel"	Patrick Moten; Richard Griffin; Sandra Sully	F. Jerkins	4:50
6.	"Freak On"	Gina Thompson; R. Jerkins	R. Jerkins	4:58
7.	"Can't Help Myself"	Ernest Tinsley; R. Jerkins; Stevie Wonder; Susaye Greene; Hodge	R. Jerkins	4:35
8.	"He'll Make a Way" (Interlude)	F. Jerkins	F. Jerkins	1:15
9.	"Put Me On"	R. Jerkins; Tony Kurtis; MC Lyte	R. Jerkins	4:24
10.	"Into You"	R. Jerkins; F. Jerkins; Marvin Winans	F. Jerkins	4:08
11.	"Strung Out"	Thompson; R. Jerkins; Sharene Jerkins	R. Jerkins	6:32
12.	"Without You"	Thompson; F. Jerkins	F. Jerkins	5:26
13.	"He'll Make a Way" (Interlude 2)	F. Jerkins	F. Jerkins	1:06
14.	"I Can't Wait" (featuring Ill Al Skratch)	R. Jerkins; Alphonse Constant; Lorenzo Grooms	R. Jerkins	3:35
15.	"The Things That You Do (Bad Boy Remix)" (featuring Missy Elliott)	R. Jerkinsn; Melissa Elliott	R. Jerkins; Sean "Puffy" Combs^{[a]}	3:52
Total length:				61:53

Notes

- ^{^[a]} denotes remix producer(s)

Sample credits

- "Can't Help Myself" contains a sample from "I Can't Help It" as written by Stevie Wonder and Susaye Greene.
- "Put Me On" contains a sample of MC Lyte rapping in the Brandy recording "I Wanna Be Down (Human Hip Hop Remix)" as co-written by Lyte.
- "Into You" contains portions of "Redeemed" as written by Marvin Winans and performed by The Winans.

== Charts ==
Weekly chart performance for Nobody Does It Better
Chart (1996)	Peak position
US Top R&B/Hip-Hop Albums (Billboard)	26
