= Men of Vizion =

American contemporary R&B group

- Origin: U.S.
- Genres: R&B, new jack swing
- Years active: 1992–present
- Label: MJJ Music
- Members: George Spencer III (G-Fly); Prathan Williams (Spanky); Anthony Fuller (Chill); Dwayne Jones (Stylz); Michael Best (Nitty Green)
- Past members: Brian Deramus; Desmond Greggs; Corley Randolph; Courtney Bradley

Men of Vizion is an American R&B group that released their debut album, Personal, featuring the songs "House Keeper" and "Do Thangz," produced by Teddy Riley and "Lil" Chris Smith.

== Discography ==
=== Albums ===
- Personal (1996) MJJ Music/Sony
- MOV (1999) MJJ Music/Sony

=== Singles ===
- "House Keeper" (US #67, R&B #13)
- "Do Thangz" (R&B #53)
- "Do You Feel Me? (...Freak You)" (R&B #45)
- "Break Me Off"

=== Videography ===
- Lean on Me (1989)
