= Ya Di Ya =

Single by Gina Thompson featuring Missy Elliott

from the album If You Only Knew
- Released: September 14, 1999
- Recorded: 1998
- Studio: Sigma Sound (Philadelphia, Pennsylvania)
- Genre: R&B; hip-hop soul
- Length: 3:53 (radio version)
- Label: Elektra; East West
- Songwriter: Eric Roberson
- Producers: K-Fam; D Major

Gina Thompson singles chronology
"It's All Yours" (1998)	"Ya Di Ya" (1999)	"Caught Up" (1999)

Missy Elliott singles chronology
"All n My Grill" (1999)	"Ya Di Ya" (1999)	"Hot Boyz" (1999)

"Ya Di Ya" is a song by American R&B singer Gina Thompson. It features guest vocals by Missy "Misdemeanor" Elliott and was released as the lead single from Thompson's unreleased album, If You Only Knew (1999).

The song became a minor hit, where it peaked at #38 on Billboard Hot R&B/Hip-Hop Songs and scored Thompson her second top 40 R&B hit and Elliott's fifteenth overall top 40 R&B hit. Because of its strong radio airplay and charting outside the United States, a "Rufftime" remix was issued via international pressings of "Ya Di Ya".

To date, "Ya Di Ya" is Thompson's only single as a leading artist to chart outside the United States.

== Music video ==
The music video for the song premiered in early July 1999 on The Box. It begins with Gina Thompson, alongside background dancers dressed in white, dancing and lip-syncing to the song. Thompson is then seen arguing with the song's antagonist over the phone before throwing the phone in a fish-tank. Missy Elliott is later shown in a silver attire performing her part.

== Track listings and formats ==
German 12" vinyl

1. "Ya Di Ya" (Album Version) – 4:20
2. "Ya Di Ya" (Rufftime Remix) – 3:53
3. "Ya Di Ya" (Album Instrumental) – 4:20
4. "Ya Di Ya" (Rufftime Remix) – 3:53
5. "Take My Number Down" (Album Version) – 3:57

German CD single

1. "Ya Di Ya" (Rufftime Remix) – 3:53
2. "Ya Di Ya" (Original Radio Edit) – 3:50
3. "Take My Number Down" (Album Version) – 3:57

US CD Maxi/12" vinyl

1. "Ya Di Ya" (LP Version) (featuring Missy Elliott) – 4:22
2. "Ya Di Ya" (Radio Version) (featuring Missy Elliott) – 3:51
3. "Ya Di Ya (Instrumental) – 4:22
4. "Take My Number Down (LP Version) – 4:02
5. "Take My Number Down (Instrumental) – 4:00
6. "Ya Di Ya" (Acappella) (featuring Missy Elliott) – 4:19

US CD single

1. "Ya Di Ya" (Original Radio Edit) (featuring Missy Elliott) – 3:50
2. "Take My Number Down" (Album Version) – 3:57

== Chart performance ==
Chart (1999)	Peak position
Germany (Media Control Charts)	85
US Billboard Bubbling Under Hot 100 Singles	24
US Billboard Hot R&B Singles & Tracks	38
US Billboard Hot 100 Singles Sales	26
