= If You Only Knew (Gina Thompson album) =

Studio album by Gina Thompson
- Released: September 21, 1999
- Recorded: 1998–1999
- Genre: R&B, hip-hop soul, gospel
- Label: The Goldmind; East West; Power Play; Elektra

Gina Thompson chronology
Nobody Does It Better (1996)	If You Only Knew (1999)	Missing You (2009)

Singles from If You Only Knew
- 1. "Ya Di Ya" Released: September 14, 1999; 2. "Caught Up" Released: 1999

If You Only Knew is the second album by American R&B singer Gina Thompson. It was scheduled to be released through Elektra Records/East West Records on September 21, 1999, however it was shelved due to the failure and lack of commercial success for her lead singles, "Ya Di Ya" (#38 U.S. R&B) and "Caught Up". Promotional copies of the album were released limitedly to reviewers and select vendors, as means to spread awareness of the album's existence before its shelving.

== Track listing ==
1. "If You Only Knew (Interlude)
2. "Take My Number Down"
3. "Ladies Anthem"
4. "Calling You"
5. "Ya Di Ya" (featuring Missy "Misdemeanor" Elliott)
6. "You Can't Play Me"
7. "It Hurts"
8. "He'll Do It Again (Interlude)"
9. "Caught Up" (featuring Beanie Sigel)
10. "Cool Out with You"
11. "Turn Around"
12. "Up All Night" (featuring Jon B.)
13. "Don't Take Your Love Away"
14. "As Long as God Allows"
