= DJ Clue discography =

This is the discography of American record producer and disc jockey DJ Clue?.

== Albums ==
=== Studio albums ===
List of albums, with selected chart positions and certifications
Title	Album details	Peak chart positions			Certifications
Title	Album details	US	US R&B	CAN	Certifications
The Professional	Released: December 15, 1998; Label: Desert Storm, Roc-A-Fella, Def Jam; Format: CD, LP, cassette, digital download	26	3	82	RIAA: Platinum
The Professional 2	Released: February 27, 2001; Label: Desert Storm, Roc-A-Fella, Def Jam; Format: CD, LP, cassette, digital download	3	1	16	RIAA: Gold
The Professional 3	Released: December 19, 2006; Label: Desert Storm, Roc-A-Fella, Def Jam; Format: CD, LP, digital download	73	18	—	
"—" denotes a recording that did not chart or was not released in that territory.

=== Soundtrack albums ===
List of albums, with selected chart positions and certifications
Title	Album details	Peak chart positions			Certifications
Title	Album details	US	US R&B	CAN	Certifications
Backstage: A Hard Knock Life	Released: August 29, 2000; Label: Desert Storm, Roc-A-Fella, Def Jam; Format: CD, LP, cassette, digital download	6	1	91	RIAA: Gold

=== Mixtapes ===
- Heatwave (1994)
- Back To School (1994)
- Halloween Holdup (1994)
- Back To School Pt. II: Final Exam (1994)
- Birthday '95 (1995)
- I-95 (1995)
- Spring Pt. 1 (1995)
- Spring Pt. 2: Double Flava (1995)
- Spring Vol. 3 (1995)
- Bad Boy Mixtape (1995)
- Summertime Shootout (1995)
- Summertime II (1995)
- Dedication (1995)
- Fall Flava (1995)
- Halloween Holdup Part. II (1995)
- Something For The Radio (1995)
- Birthday Blizzard (1996)
- Dedication 2 (1996)
- Springtime Stickup Pt. 1 (1996)
- Springtme Stickup Pt. II: The Payback (1996)
- Summatyme Shootout 2 (1996)
- 4, 5, 6 (Going for Broke) (1996)
- R&B Pt. 1: Just Cruisin (1996)
- The Fall Out (1996)
- Holiday Holdup 1996 (1996)
- Show Me The Money (1997)
- Show Me The Money Pt. 2 (1997)
- R&B Part 2 Just Cruisin Again (1997)
- Cluemanatti (1997)
- Cluemanatti Pt. 2: The Rematch (1997)
- Platinum Plus (1997)
- Triple Platinum (1997)
- DJ Clue for President (1998)
- DJ Clue for President 2 (1998)
- Clue for President III: New Acuzations! (1998)
- Desert Storm "98" Clunino (1998)
- This Is It (1998)
- This Is It Part 2 (1998)
- You Can't Impeach The President (1999)
- The Ruler's Back (1999)
- The Ruler's Back Pt. 2 (1999)
- Queens Day Part One (1999)
- The Great Ones Pt. 1 (2000)
- The Great Ones Pt. 2 (2000)
- The Great Ones Pt. 3 (2000)
- The Perfect Desert Storm (2000)
- Stadium Series (2000)
- William M Holla (2000)
- William M Holla 2 (2001)
- Hev E. Components Pts. 1-3 (2001)
- Mixtapes For Dummies (2001)
- Show You How To Do This (2002)
- Hate Me Now (2002)
- Hate Me Now 2 (2002)
- Hate Me Now 3 (2002)
- Holiday Holdup '02 (2002)
- Please Don't Throw Rocks at the Throne (2003)
- Where Da Hood At? (2003)
- Where Da Hood At? Pt. 2 (2003)
- Where Da Hood At? Pt. 3 (2003)
- Thee American Idol (2003)
- Thee American Idol Part 2 (2004)
- Man On Fire (2004)
- New York Giant (2004)
- Cherry Lounge (2004)
- He's A Pro! (2005)
- Fidel Cashflow (2005)
- Desert Storm Radio, Vol.1 (with DJ Storm) (2006)
- The Incredible (2006)
- It's Me Snitches (2007)
- Desert Storm Radio, Vol.8 (2008)
- TV volume 1 (2008)
- Desert Storm Radio: The Takeover (2012)
- Banned From CD 2015 Part One (2015)

== Singles ==
List of singles, with selected chart positions, showing year released and album name
Title	Year	Peak chart positions		Album
Title	Year	US R&B	US Rap	Album
"Thugged Out Shit" (featuring Memphis Bleek)	1998	—	—	The Professional
"It's On" (featuring DMX)	1998	39	—	The Professional
"I Like Control" (featuring Missy Elliott, Mocha and Nicole Wray)	1999	81	—	The Professional
"Ruff Ryders' Anthem" (Remix) (featuring DMX, Drag-On, Eve, Jadakiss and Styles P)	1999	47	—	The Professional
"Back 2 Life 2001" (featuring Mary J. Blige and Jadakiss)	2000	57	—	The Professional 2
"I Really Wanna Know You" (featuring Jagged Edge and Fabolous)	2006	53	25	The Professional 3
"Rich Friday" (featuring Nicki Minaj, Future, Juelz Santana and French Montana)	2013	—	—	
"Fuck A Real Nigga" (featuring Plies, Lil Wayne, Chris Echols and Chinx)	2018	—	—	
"—" denotes a recording that did not chart.
