= The Life I Live =

Studio album by Torrey Carter
- Released: 2000
- Labels: The Goldmind; EW; Elektra
- Producers: Missy "Misdemeanor" Elliott, Timbaland, Flavahood, Nokio, Charlamagne, Bink!, DJ Eddie F., Gerard Thomas, Brycyn Evans, Brian Kidd, Gerald Isaac

Singles from The Life I Live
- 1. "Take That" Released: June 6, 2000; 2. "If It's Money You Want" Released: 2000

The Life I Live is an unreleased studio album by American R&B singer Torrey Carter, originally meant to be his debut solo album. The album was led by the top 20 R&B hit, "Take That" (featuring Missy "Misdemeanor" Elliott); the album also listed "If It's Money That You Want" as the second single, where it began to gain minor airplay. However, both singles failed to become much of a success, thus the album was shelved.

== Critical reception ==
Professional ratings
Review scores
Source	Rating
AllMusic	3/5 stars

AllMusicrated the album three out of five stars.

== Track listing ==
From Yahoo Music.

1. "Floss Ya Jewels"
2. "Take That" (featuring Missy "Misdemeanor" Elliott)
3. "Shotgun" (featuring Lil' Mo)
4. "The Life I Wanna Live" (featuring Nokio of Dru Hill)
5. "Cream (Ride or Die)" (featuring Lil' Mo & Nokio of Dru Hill)
6. "We Gon' Do"
7. "If It's Money That You Want"
8. "Now I Got a Girl"
9. "Same 'Ol" (featuring Missy "Misdemeanor" Elliott)
10. "It Takes Two" (featuring Lil' Mo)
11. "Insanity"

== Leftover tracks ==
- "O.K." (featuring Missy "Misdemeanor" Elliott, Petey Pablo & Trick Daddy)
- "Tight Jeans"
