= Torrey Carter =

American R&B singer

- Born: Torrey Carter; April 15, 1980 (age 46); Grand Rapids, Michigan, United States
- Genres: R&B, soul, hip-hop
- Occupation: Singer
- Years active: 1999–present
- Labels: The Goldmind/Elektra Records (1999–2000)

Torrey Carter (nicknamed T.C.) (born April 15, 1980) is an American R&B singer. He gained popularity after signing to Missy Elliott's The Goldmind Inc. as the first male artist under the label. There, he began recording for his debut album, The Life I Live, which was led by the single "Take That" (US #87; US R&B No. 14). However, due to the lack of mainstream success with the lead single, the album was shelved and he departed from Goldmind.

In 2006, Carter co-wrote and helped produce Nina Sky's song, "Building a Vibe". Footage of the recording leaked via YouTube that same year. By 2007, Carter's MySpace singles ("Pause" and "Get It Girl") had accumulated enough buzz for him to prepare a possible album, however the idea was scrapped and Carter went on to embark on other musical opportunities.

He has been recently featured in hip-hop producer Shawneci's recent mixtapes, Icecold Collection (Vol. 1–2).

On September 25, 2012, Carter released the R&B womanizing-themed "ReBirth" via iTunes and Amazon. In November 2012, a music video for the single leaked via YouTube and had accumulated over 50,000 views in just one month; however, due to undisclosed reasons the video was removed and has since then been re-uploaded.

In December 2017, Carter was arrested on drug charges in Grand Rapids, Michigan.
