= All n My Grill =

1999 single by Missy Elliott featuring Big Boi and Nicole Wray

- European single cover

Single by Missy Elliott featuring Big Boi and Nicole Wray or MC Solaar

from the album Da Real World
- Released: September 13, 1999
- Recorded: 1998
- Studio: Master Sound Studios (Virginia Beach)
- Length: 4:33
- Label: Goldmind; Elektra
- Songwriters: Melissa Elliott; Tim Mosley; Antwan Patton
- Producer: Timbaland

Missy Elliott singles chronology
"She's a Bitch" (1999)	"All n My Grill" (1999)	"Ya Di Ya" (1999)

Big Boi singles chronology
"Dirty South" (1995)	"All n My Grill" (1999)	"Get Rich to This" (1999)

Nicole Wray singles chronology
"Eyes Better Not Wander" (1999)	"All n My Grill" (1999)	"I'm Lookin'" (2001)

MC Solaar singles chronology
"Galaktika" (1998)	"All n My Grill" (1999)	"Solaar pleure" (2001)

Music video
- "All n My Grill" on YouTube

"All n My Grill" is the second single from Missy "Misdemeanor" Elliott's 1999 album, Da Real World. The song featured Big Boi of Outkast and vocal ad-libs from her former protégé, Nicole Wray. The song had more success than the first single, "She's a Bitch".

In European markets, another version of the song featuring French rapper MC Solaar was released adding French rap lyrics performed by MC Solaar. This bilingual English/French version became a charting hit in Belgium, France, Netherlands, Germany and Sweden. This version had appeared as a bonus track on the album Da Real World as an alternative to then main version featuring Big Boi and Nicole Wray.

The song was a hit in the UK as well with the promo single featuring MC Solaar being remixed by Boy George and Kinky Roland.

The main sample of the song is "Dernier Domicile Connu," composed by François de Roubaix.

== Music video ==
The video was directed by Hype Williams and featured Nicole Wray and Big Boi. The video starts with Elliott in a car singing. She gets out of the car and starts singing the rest of the song walking down a street. Nicole Wray is singing in a car for most of the video. There are people dancing around in yellow rain coats in the rain. At the end, Big Boi raps in the middle of the street. The video premiered on TV in August 1999.

== Track listings ==
=== UK Single ===
12" Promo

1. "All N My Grill" (Boy George & Kinky Roland Mix) (featuring MC Solaar) - 6:43

CD Maxi-Single

1. "All N My Grill" (Edit) (featuring MC Solaar) - 3:34
2. "All N My Grill" (Radio Edit) (featuring Nicole Wray & Big Boi) - 3:58
3. "All N My Grill" (Album Version) (featuring MC Solaar) - 4:47

=== US Single ===
12" Single

Side A

1. "All N My Grill" (Edit) (featuring Nicole Wray & MC Solaar) - 3:34
2. "All N My Grill" (Radio Edit) (featuring Nicole Wray & Big Boi) - 3:38

Side B

1. "All N My Grill" (Instrumental) - 4:32
2. "All N My Grill" (Clean Version) (featuring Nicole Wray & Big Boi) - 4:32

=== Europe Single ===
CD Single

1. "All N My Grill" (Edit) (featuring MC Solaar) - 3:34
2. "All N My Grill" (Album Version) (featuring MC Solaar) - 4:47

== Charts ==
All positions for version featuring MC Solaar, except positions for US featuring Big Boi and Nicole Wray.

=== Weekly charts ===
Weekly chart performance for "All n My Grill"
Chart (1999)	Peak position
Belgium (Ultratip Bubbling Under Flanders)	7
Belgium (Ultratop 50 Wallonia)	9
France (SNEP)	16
Germany (GfK)	22
Netherlands (Dutch Top 40 Tipparade)	4
Netherlands (Single Top 100)	86
Scottish Singles Sales (Official Charts)	52
Sweden (Sverigetopplistan)	39
Switzerland (Schweizer Hitparade)	23
UK Singles (Official Charts)	20
UK Dance (Official Charts)	9
UK Hip Hop/R&B (Official Charts)	1
US Billboard Hot 100	64
US Hot R&B/Hip-Hop Songs (Billboard)	16
US Rhythmic Airplay (Billboard)	29

=== Year-end charts ===
Year-end chart performance for "All n My Grill"
Chart (1999)	Position
UK Urban (Music Week)	19
