= Pep Rally (song) =

Promotional single by Missy Elliott
- Released: February 7, 2016
- Length: 4:22
- Label: Goldmind; Atlantic
- Songwriters: Melissa Arnette Elliott; Pharrell Williams
- Producer: Pharrell Williams

"Pep Rally" is a song by American rapper Missy Elliott. It was released by The Goldmind Inc. and Atlantic Records on February 7, 2016, as a promotional single. The song is heard in a commercial for Amazon's Echo speaker, which features Elliott as well as actors Alec Baldwin and Jason Schwartzman. "Pep Rally" is also featured in a 2019 Gatorade commercial with Dwyane Wade and Gabrielle Union.

== Critical reception ==
In a retrospective review of the song, Steven J. Horowitz from Vulture called the song "a drumline knocker released via an Amazon Echo commercial. It's more in line with the late-era, party-starting fare of [Elliott's] catalogue, with bits of bounce thrown in for good measure."

== Release history ==
Release history for "Pep Rally"
Region	Date	Format(s)	Label	Ref(s)
Various	February 7, 2016	Digital download	Goldmind; Atlantic	
