= The Goldmind Inc. =

American record label

- Founded: 1997
- Founder: Missy Elliott
- Status: Active
- Distributor: Atlantic Records (United States); Warner Music Group (International)
- Genre: Various
- Country of origin: U.S.

The Goldmind, Inc. is an American record label founded in 1997 by rapper Missy Elliott. Elliott and Goldmind were once distributed through East West Records & Elektra Entertainment Group, Until 2004 when Time Warner sold WMG (Parent company to Elektra) to a private investment group. The new owners then merged the Elektra with sister label Atlantic Records, transferring Elliott and Goldmind. Goldmind is home to Missy Elliott, specializing in R&B/hip-hop/soul music.

== History ==
In 1997, Missy Elliott released her debut album Supa Dupa Fly, making it The Goldmind, Inc.'s official entrance into the music industry. The album, which was produced by Timbaland, spawned four hit singles, including the Grammy nominated "The Rain (Supa Dupa Fly)", "Sock It 2 Me", "Beep Me 911" and "Hit 'Em Wit Da Hee". The album featured vocals by Nicole Wray, who was to become Elliott's first artist for The Goldmind, Inc. other than Elliott herself.

In 1998, Nicole released her debut album Make It Hot, which was backed by the Timbaland produced smash hit single of the same title and two other minor hits "I Can't See" and "Eyes Better Not Wander". That same year Elliott was asked to Executive Produce, along with Timbaland, Sylvia Rhone and Merlin Bobb, the soundtrack to the film Why Do Fools Fall In Love (starring Halle Berry, Vivica A. Fox, Lela Rochon and Larenz Tate). The soundtrack featured vocals from Gina Thompson, Destiny's Child, Coko, Busta Rhymes, En Vogue, Lil' Mo, Mel B aka Scary Spice, Mint Condition, The Goldmind's Nicole and the newly signed Mocha and Elliott herself. The soundtrack produced four minor hits "Get On The Bus" Performed by Destiny's Child and Timbaland, "No Fool No More" Performed by En Vogue, "I Want You Back" Performed by Mel B and "5 Minutes" Performed by Lil' Mo.

In 1999, after signing three more artists: Gina Thompson (who appeared on the "Why Do Fools Fall In Love" Soundtrack), Danja Mowf and Torrey Carter; Elliott released her second album Da Real World which was originally intended to be called "She's A Bitch". The album was widely embraced by Elliott's fans and fans of the Timbaland sound. The album gave Elliott another three hit singles "She's A Bitch", the #1 hit single "Hot Boyz" and "All N My Grill" which featured vocals from Nicole. Gina Thompson, who was originally signed to Mercury Records under the production of Rodney and Fred Jerkins' Darkchild productions, produced a hit single featuring Elliott "Ya Di Ya". The song was taken from her second album If You Only Knew, but the album was never officially released.

In early 2000, Elliott's '"Da Real World" was still on the charts. That year saw the debut of Elliott's first male artist Torrey Carter (nicknamed T.C.) with the single "Take That" taken from his debut album The Life I Live. His album suffered the same fate as Gina Thompson's album. Danja Mowf of the 'Superfriendz' who was originally signed in 1998 after contributing vocals to Aaliyah's "Are You That Somebody (Remix)" and then performing an impromptu rap over the phone, asked to leave The Goldmind because of broken promises that he'd make an album. So with four artist's leaving the label, Elliott began working on her third album, but needed someone to perform background vocals so she gave one of her old friends from her Swing Mob days a call. That friend was Charlene "Tweet" Keys, who was at the time depressed and penniless and was on the verge of committing suicide. Tweet credits Elliott as her guardian angel.

2001 saw the release of Miss E…So Addictive. The album was a success and produced four hit singles, the Grammy award-winning "Get Ur Freak On," "One Minute Man," "Take Away," and "4 My People". In between the process of singles being released, Elliott would sign rock collective Sider to her label however the group would later disperse the fourth quarter of 2001 before any material was released by them. 2001 also saw two tragic events in Elliott's life. The first being her mother, Patricia Elliott, who plays a major role in The Goldmind Inc.'s success, suffering a stroke (she has since fully recovered), and the second being the death of her very good friend Aaliyah, who introduced the hit making duo Elliott and Timbaland to the music industry with her second album One In A Million in 1996. Nicole was also supposed to release her second project Elektric Blue that year, but left the label because of poor promotion from her first single, "I'm Lookin'" and many pushbacks along with the album. Mocha, who contributed vocals to Elliott's "Hit 'Em Wit Da Hee (Remix)", Gina Thompson's "Why Do Fools Fall In Love" and Nicole's debut album, most notably the hit "Make It Hot", was believed to have left The Goldmind, Inc. around this time because her debut album Bella Mafia was never released and remained in the shadows.

In 2002, The Goldmind released Tweet's debut album, Southern Hummingbird, which was backed by the Timbaland produced hit single "Oops (Oh My)." The album also produced two other singles "Call Me" and "Smoking Cigarettes," and was certified gold. In late 2002, Elliott released her fourth album Under Construction which went double platinum (her first multi-platinum release, as all of Elliott's previous albums stalled at platinum). The album spawned two hit singles, the Grammy award-winning and the 7x MTV VMA nominated song "Work It" and "Gossip Folks" and the two radio hit single's "Pussycat" and "Back In The Day."

In 2003, Elliott released her platinum selling fifth album This Is Not A Test!. Although it did go platinum, it was not as successful as Elliott's previous efforts. The two single's "Pass That Dutch" and "I'm Really Hot" didn't have a huge impact on radio. Elliott also signed Lil' Brianna aka Kandy Girl (who appears in Elliott's "Pass That Dutch" music video) to The Goldmind.

2004 didn't see any album releases from The Goldmind. This was because Elliott along with The Goldmind, Inc. and Tweet were moved from Elektra Entertainment Group to Atlantic Records. In late 2004, Tweet joined Cee-Lo Green and Teedra Moses on the Seagram's Gin Live Tour in promotion of her new single produced by Kwame & Elliott, "Turn Da Lights Off".

In early 2005, Elliott's new TV program The Road to Stardom with Missy Elliott premiered. The show followed thirteen would-be musical artists hit the road with Elliott in a competition to be signed to The Goldmind, Inc. Jessica Betts eventually won the competition and walked away with $100,000 and a chance to cut a single for The Goldmind Inc. She recorded her debut album, Jessie Pearl, and was at first to include various collaborations from the likes of Elliott, Timbaland, Faith Evans and labelmate, Tweet; the result was two Elliott and Souldiggaz contributions and a delayed release in Japan. Around this time, Elliott crafted a new trio named Wicked (who would be renamed "So Def") and hinted to Billboard Magazine of what type of genre the group would be. March 2005 saw the release of Tweet's overdue second album, It's Me Again, but because of poor promotion the album didn't sell as well as originally intended and fell off the charts within months of its release. 2005 also saw the release of Elliott's sixth album The Cookbook. This album saw her departure from her main producing partner, Timbaland, who contributed only two tracks. Elliott says the reason for this was to give themselves a break as she felt they were experiencing "writer's block." The album produced one hit single, the Grammy Nominated and MTV VMA winning "Lose Control" and another single "Teary Eyed". "We Run This" was released as an international lead single for Elliott's first compilation, Respect M.E. and the final single from The Cookbook.

In 2006, rumors circulated that Rozonda "Chilli" Thomas of TLC was negotiating with Missy to sign with The Goldmind. Missy has been confirmed to be an executive producer on Chilli's album. Around this time, R&B trio, So Def (formerly Wicked), were officially signed to the label with an accompanying MySpace page, licensed under Atlantic/Goldmind; the group released "Hell Naw" as a buzz single for their album later that year. Around this time, Lil' Brianna (a.k.a. Kandy Girl), left the label due to creative differences.

In 2007, R&B trio, So Def, left the label due to undisclosed reasons, thus their album was left unfinished.

In 2008, Elliott was featured on two tracks to the soundtrack of Step Up 2: The Streets. In December of that same year, a debut album by Road to Stardom winner, Jessica Betts, was shelved in the U.S. and was released exclusively to Japan.

2010 saw the signing of rapper, Sharaya Howell, who was introduced by Elliott in the 2009 Crash Mansion Concert; her Soul Diggaz-produced single, "Green Light" leaked via internet in late January 2010. June 2010 saw the release of another single by Sharaya known as, "What Is Love?"; the single has been widely speculated to be released internationally after numerous performances of the song occurred during Missy Elliott's 2010 international summer tour.

2012 marked the year of Elliott's return to the rap game. In September 2012, Elliott released two new songs ("9th Inning" and "Triple Threat") exclusively to iTunes. Both songs were rumored to be featured on Elliott's long-awaited next album, which was at one point titled Block Party.

From 2013 to 2014, scant releases followed from signee Sharaya, including the debut single "Banji" and the "Take Away"-sampled "Takin' It No More".

2015 would see the release of new solo music performed by Elliott. This period would also be the timing of production crew Soul Diggaz disbandment from the Goldmind. On November 12, 2015, after years of delays and previous failed attempts of materializing a proper single, Missy Elliott readied the offering "WTF (Where They From)," featuring vocal and production assistance from recurring collaborator Pharrell Williams.

2016 saw the release another Elliott single "Pep Rally" alongside the departure of previous understudy Sharaya J, who left to start her own production company and release more music frequently without label restriction. The following year, Elliott would release another single "I'm Better".

By 2019, Elliott would compose an EP as a prelude to an official seventh studio album; the critically acclaimed Iconology.

== Releases ==
=== Albums ===
- Missy "Misdemeanor" Elliott – Supa Dupa Fly (1997) Platinum
- Nicole – Make It Hot (1998) Platinum
- Why Do Fools Fall In Love Soundtrack (1998) Gold
- Missy "Misdemeanor" Elliott – Da Real World (1999) Platinum
- Missy "Misdemeanor" Elliott – Miss E… So Addictive (2001) Platinum
- Tweet – Southern Hummingbird (2002) Gold
- Missy Elliott – Under Construction (2002) 2× Platinum
- Missy Elliott – This Is Not A Test (2003) Platinum
- Tweet – It's Me Again (2005) Gold
- Missy Elliott – The Cookbook (2005) Platinum

=== Extended plays ===
- Nicole – Elektric Blue: Album Sampler (2001)
- Missy Elliott – Iconology (2019)

=== Upcoming albums ===
- Missy Elliott – (TBA)

=== Unreleased albums ===
- Gina Thompson – If You Only Knew (1999)
- Torrey Carter – The Life I Live (2000)
- Nicole – Elektric Blue (2001)
- Mocha – Bella Mafia (2001)
- Jessica Betts – Jessie Pearl (2008)

=== Singles ===
- 1997: Missy "Misdemeanor" Elliott – The Rain (Supa Dupa Fly) (R&B#4/UK#16)
- 1997: Missy "Misdemeanor" Elliott – Sock It 2 Me (featuring Da Brat) (US#12/R&B#4/UK#33)
- 1997: Missy "Misdemeanor" Elliott – Beep Me 911 (featuring 702, Timbaland and Magoo) (UK#14)
- 1998: Missy "Misdemeanor" Elliott – Hit 'Em Wit da Hee [Remix] (featuring Timbaland and Mocha) (UK#25)
- 1998: Nicole – Make It Hot (featuring Missy "Misdemeanor" Elliott and Mocha) (US#5/R&B#2/UK#22)
- 1998: Mel B – I Want You Back (featuring Missy "Misdemeanor" Elliott) (UK#1)
- 1998: Lil' Mo – 5 Minutes (featuring Missy "Misdemeanor" Elliott)
- 1998: Nicole – I Can't See [Alternate Version] (featuring Mocha)
- 1998: Destiny's Child – Get on the Bus (featuring Timbaland) (UK#15)
- 1999: Nicole – Eyes Better Not Wander (R&B#71)
- 1999: En Vogue – No Fool No More
- 1998: Missy "Misdemeanor" Elliott and Busta Rhymes – Get Contact
- 1999: Missy "Misdemeanor" Elliott – She's a B**** (US#90/R&B#30/Rap#19)
- 1999: Missy "Misdemeanor" Elliott – All N My Grill (featuring Big Boi of Outkast and Nicole) (US#64/R&B#16/UK#20)
- 1999: Gina Thompson – Ya Di Ya (featuring Missy "Misdemeanor" Elliott) (R&B#38)
- 1999: Gina Thompson – Caught Up (featuring Beanie Sigel)
- 1999: Missy "Misdemeanor" Elliott – Hot Boyz [Remix] (featuring Nas, Eve, Q-Tip and Lil' Mo) (US#5/R&B#1/UK#18)
- 2000: Torrey Carter – Take That (featuring Missy "Misdemeanor" Elliott) (US#87/R&B#14)
- 2000: Nicole – Bangin' (Don't Lie) (featuring Prodigy of Mobb Deep)
- 2001: Nicole – I'm Lookin' (R&B#66)
- 2001: Nicole – Mama Used To Say (No Joke) (featuring Redman and Missy "Misdemeanor" Elliott)
- 2001: Missy "Misdemeanor" Elliott – Get Ur Freak On (US#7/R&B#3/Rap#7/UK#4) b/w Lick Shots (R&B#63/Rap#25)
- 2001: Missy "Misdemeanor" Elliott – One Minute Man [Alternate Version] (featuring Ludacris and Trina) (US#15/R&B#8/UK#10)
- 2001: Mocha – Mardi Gras (featuring Missy "Misdemeanor" Elliott & Lil' Mo)
- 2001: Mocha – Running Ish (featuring Timbaland)
- 2001: Missy "Misdemeanor" Elliott – Take Away [Radio Edit] (featuring Ginuwine and introducing Tweet) (US#45/R&B#13)
- 2002: Missy "Misdemeanor" Elliott – 4 My People [Basement Jaxx Remix] (UK#5)
- 2002: Tweet – Oops (Oh My) (featuring Missy "Misdemeanor" Elliott) (US#7/R&B#1/UK#5)
- 2002: Tweet – Call Me (US#31/R&B#9/UK#35)
- 2002: Missy Elliott – Work It (US#2/R&B#1/Rap#1/UK#6)
- 2002: Tweet – Smoking Cigarettes
- 2002; Tweet – Boogie 2nite
- 2002: Missy Elliott – Gossip Folks (featuring Ludacris) (US#8/R&B#5/Rap#2/UK#9)
- 2003: Missy Elliott – P***ycat (featuring Tweet) (US#77/R&B#26/Rap#15)
- 2003: Missy Elliott – Back in the Day (featuring Jay-Z and Tweet) (R&B#86)
- 2003: Missy Elliott – Pass That Dutch (US#27/R&B#17/Rap#9/UK#10)
- 2004: Missy Elliott – I'm Really Hot (US#59/R&B#26/Rap#18/UK#22)
- 2004: Missy Elliott – I'm Not Perfect (featuring The Clark Sisters)
- 2005: Tweet – Turn da Lights Off (featuring Missy "Misdemeanor" Elliott) (R&B#39/UK#29)
- 2005: Tweet – When I Need a Man
- 2005: Missy Elliott – Lose Control (featuring Ciara and Fat Man Scoop) (US#3/R&B#6/Rap#3/UK#7)
- 2005: Tweet – Cab Ride
- 2005: Missy Elliott – Teary Eyed (featuring Tweet) (UK#47)
- 2006: Missy Elliott – We Run This (US#48)
- 2006: So Def – Hell Naw
- 2007: Jessica Betts – Whisper
- 2008: Missy Elliott – Ching-a-Ling (US#60/Rap#11)
- 2008: Missy Elliott – Best, Best (R&B#94)
- 2010: Sharaya J – Green Light
- 2010: Sharaya J – What Is Love?
- 2012: Missy Elliott – 9th Inning
- 2012: Missy Elliott – Triple Threat
- 2013: Sharaya J – BANJI
- 2014: Sharaya J – Takin' It No More
- 2015: Missy Elliott – WTF (Where They From) (featuring Pharrell Williams) (US#22/R&B#8)
- 2016: Missy Elliott – Pep Rally
- 2017: Missy Elliott – I'm Better (US#71)
- 2019: Missy Elliott – Throw It Back (US#101)

== Artists ==
=== Current roster ===
- Missy "Misdemeanor" Elliott (The Goldmind/Atlantic)

=== Former ===
- Soul Diggaz
- Sharaya J
- Tweet
- Jessica Betts
- Lil' Brianna
- Nicole
- Gina Thompson
- Jade
- Danja Mowf
- So Def
- Mocha
- Sider
- Torrey "T.C." Carter

=== Associates ===
- Jazmine Sullivan
- Lil' Mo
- Keli Nicole Price
- Timbaland

== See also ==
- List of record labels

== Notes ==
- Bezdecheck, Bethany (2009). Missy Elliott (Library of Hip-Hop Biographies). The Rosen Publishing Group, Inc. ISBN 978-1-4358-5056-9.
