= I'm Better =

Single by Missy Elliott

Single by Missy Elliott featuring Lamb
- Released: January 27, 2017
- Genre: Hip hop
- Length: 3:40
- Label: Goldmind; Atlantic
- Songwriters: Melissa Elliott; Cainon Lamb
- Producer: Lamb x Yonni

Missy Elliott singles chronology
"Ghostbusters (I'm Not Afraid)" (2016)	"I'm Better" (2017)	"Throw It Back" (2019)

Music video
- "I'm Better" on YouTube

"I'm Better" is a song by American recording artist Missy Elliott, featuring accompanying vocals by frequent production partner Lamb.

== Critical reception ==
In a retrospective review of the song, Steven J. Horowitz from Vulture found that with "I'm Better" Elliott "reemerged with what could have been a triumphant single, but it didn’t feel entirely natural to her style. Flush with sirens and tip-toeing synths, "I’m Better" loses its footing with its trap-inspired meter – more Migos than Missy."

== Music video ==
The video was co-directed by Elliott and Dave Meyers. Elliot noted that she had the video in mind upon listening to the track. The video took a month to rehearse owing to Elliott's wish to make it "look like art instead of just a video" and for the choreography to be "challenging". Rolling Stone noted the video "builds on Elliott's future-forward off-kilter aesthetic", also stating that it "nods as much to sci-fi as classic, Hype Williams-era hip-hop videos". Further praise from Billboard, stating the music video is a "stylized, can’t-look-away clip", and noted the "aquatic sequence is an unexpected trip".

== Remix ==
An official remix of "I'm Better" was released in May 2017. The remix featured Eve, Lil' Kim, and Trina.

== Track listings ==
1. "I'm Better" (featuring Lamb) – 3:33
2. "I'm Better" (Remix) (featuring Eve, Lil Kim and Trina) – 4:29

== Charts ==
Chart (2017)	Peak position
Canada Hot 100 (Billboard)	74
France (SNEP)	120
US Billboard Hot 100	71
US Hot R&B/Hip-Hop Songs (Billboard)	28

== Release history ==
List of release dates, showing region, formats, label, and reference
Region	Date	Format(s)	Label	Ref.
United States	January 27, 2017	Digital download	Atlantic; Goldmind	
United States	March 14, 2017	Urban radio	Atlantic	
