= Iconology (EP) =

EP by Missy Elliott
- Released: August 23, 2019
- Recorded: 2018 – April 2019
- Genres: Hip hop; pop; R&B
- Length: 14:49
- Labels: Goldmind; Atlantic
- Producers: Missy Elliott; Wili Hendrix; Angel Lopez; Timbaland; Federico Vindver

Missy Elliott chronology
| Respect M.E. (2006) | Iconology (2019) |

Singles from Iconology
- 1. "Throw It Back" Released: August 23, 2019; 2. "DripDemeanor" Released: October 22, 2019

Iconology is the first extended play (EP) by American hip hop artist Missy Elliott, released on August 23, 2019. It is her first body of work since her 2005 album The Cookbook and her first release since Respect M.E. The EP features a variety of musical genres that cover the breadth of her career as an artist and has received favorable reviews from critics. It was released at a time when Elliott returned to music following a lengthy hiatus.

== Background ==
Missy Elliott
(@MissyElliott)
tweeted:

At midnight tonight I'm dropping a collection of new songs! Let's #ThrowItBack to a time when music just felt good and made us want to dance! Sincerely, Dr. Melissa "Missy" Elliott #ICONOLOGY

August 22, 2019

In June 2018, Mona Scott-Young mentioned that she was working with Elliott on a new project but gave no further details on the nature of it or when it would be publicly available. Elliott had generally avoided public performances or recordings outside of guest appearances or occasional singles due to her diagnosis with Graves' disease along with a fear that she was musically irrelevant; Iconology follows the March 2019 release of her collaboration with Lizzo, "Tempo". The following month, Elliott mentioned that she was finished recording an album but said that she would release details later. By June, she was calling the project ME7 and announced the track "Summer" would be on it; she confirmed that she was working with Timbaland again.

== Composition ==
Musically, Iconology is a pop, hip hop and R&B EP reminiscent of Elliott's previous work. The opening track, "Throw It Back" contains "trap snares and a serpentine bassline", which along with the second track, "Cool Off", were described as "woozy, futuristic romps" containing "distorted bass lines and frenetic production". Lyrically, "Throw It Back" contains references to Elliott's history, as well as previous collaborators Tweet and Heavy D. Maura Johnson of Entertainment Weekly described "Cool Off" as calling "back to hip-hop's two-turntables-and-a-mic early days". "DripDemeanor" has been described as a slow jam that explores Elliott's "sensuous side". Musically, it contains "plush synths [that] skip-step underneath" the song's beat. "Why I Still Love You" is a doo-wop song with gospel influences and jazz influence that lyrically chronicles the singer's "conflicted emotions about holding on to a cheating lover". The EP closes with an a cappella version of "Why I Still Love You".

Elliott was motivated to write uplifting music to counter mainstream trends and encourage more dance music to feel good.

== Promotion ==
Elliott announced the album via social media as a surprise release several hours prior to the album release. Additionally, Elliott was set to be honored at the MTV Video Music Awards as well as performing at the ceremony for the first time in 16 years. Upon release of the album, Elliott also released the lead single, "Throw It Back", with a music video featuring Teyana Taylor. "DripDemeanor" was released as the album's second single on October 22, alongside its music video. The music video for "Why I Still Love You" was released on January 17, 2020. The music video for "Cool Off" was released on April 21, 2020.

== Critical reception ==
Professional ratings
Aggregate scores
| Source | Rating |
|---|---|
| Metacritic | 73/100 |
Review scores
| Source | Rating |
| AllMusic | 3/5 stars |
| Entertainment Weekly | B |
| HipHopDX | 3.9/5 |
| The Line of Best Fit | 9/10 |
| NME | 3/5 stars |
| The Philadelphia Inquirer | 3.5/5 stars |
| Pitchfork | 4.6/10 |
| PopMatters | 8/10 stars |
| Rolling Stone | 3.5/5 stars |

According to the review aggregator Metacritic, Iconology received "generally favorable reviews" based on a weighted average score of 73 out of 100 from ten critic scores. Album of the Year assessed the critical consensus as a 67 out of 100. Jem Aswad of Variety gave the EP a positive review, calling it "more like a hearty appetizer than a full meal" and noting, "And although the passage of time has inevitably made her sound evoke feelings of nostalgia, these songs are also completely now". Entertainment Weekly's Maura Johnson gave Iconology a B, calling it "a bit of a letdown" but made up of strong material. In the Los Angeles Times, Gerrick D. Kennedy calls the EP "a brief reminder of the performer's genius". Anika Reed of USA Today reacted to the record positively, writing "the project brings back the Missy fans know and love, with booming bass beats that are the perfect backdrop to showcase her lyrical prowess".

Spencer Kornhaber of The Atlantic gave a mixed review, praising the basic musicality but criticizing it for lacking the experimentation of Elliott's earlier career and saying that the release is "perplexing" with each song "feel[ing] driven by a desire to make a point". In NME, Will Lavin described the record as a "a versatile mixed bag" but criticised it for not being a full-length release. Shannon Miller of The A.V. Club agreed with other reviewers that the EP is too brief to satisfy fans but instead argued that the release is a sampler of many of Elliott's styles and wrote that the music "serve[s] as further reassertion of her lasting impact on the industry as a whole... [and] works to further cement her indelible imprint on popular entertainment". Aaron Williams of Uproxx also compared this work to Elliott's 2002 album, Under Construction and her other musical influences while emphasizing her originality on this release.

In the Mail & Guardian, Zaza Hlalethwa takes the opportunity to review Elliott's career through Iconology and the VMA award, noting how Elliott's signature vocal delivery has influenced further artists and her music video aesthetic remains unique, even among other musicians who have followed since her debut; the reviewer asserts that the work "pushes no boundaries" while still showcasing the artist's strengths. Paul Thompson of Vulture gave a brief, mixed review that praises her vocal work but calls the first two opening tracks "replacement-level trap numbers". Dan Weiss of The Philadelphia Inquirer gave the EP 3.5 out of five stars, calling it "an exceedingly slapdash and minimal release... rush-released to cash in on Missy Elliott's Video Vanguard honor" but praising the actual content, including Elliott's vocal performance on the a capella track. Rob Sheffield also emphasized the greatness of Elliott as an artist and ends his Rolling Stone review, "It's a vital reminder of why we’ve been missing her so much. And of why she'll always be welcome back." Fred Thomas of AllMusic called the album, "a brief and somewhat awkward sampling of various genre exercises, all fun and lively but nowhere near the excellence of Elliott's best" and the editorial staff of the site gave it three out of five stars.

After the site declared the release one of the most anticipated of the year in January, Pitchfork's Stephen Kearse gave the EP a score of 4.6 out of 10, calling it rushed and stating, "There's nothing insightful or fun about Missy looking back rather than ahead, especially when she's already released two compilation records during her hiatus." PopMatters' Elisabeth Woronzoff gave the album eight out of 10, echoing the desire for more work from Elliot, calling this a "welcomed returned and a hopeful teaser for upcoming projects".

== Track listing ==
Credits adapted from the liner notes.

1. "Throw It Back" (Michael Aristotle, William Jared Buggs, Missy Elliott, and Quintin Ernest Talbert) – 3:13
2. "Cool Off" (Aristotle, Buggs, Elliott, Talbert) – 2:15
3. "DripDemeanor" (Corte Ellis, Elliott, and Timothy Mosley) – 3:52
4. "Why I Still Love You" (Elliott and Timbaland) – 2:49
5. "Why I Still Love You" (Acapella) (Elliott and Timbaland) – 2:40

== Personnel ==
- Missy Elliott – lead artist, songwriter, production on "DripDemeanor"
- Brandon Black – synth bass, vocoder on "DripDemeanor"
- Chris Godbey – engineering
- Wili Hendrix – production on "Throw It Back" and "Cool Off"
- Angel Lopez – co-production on "Why I Still Love You" and "Why I Still Love You" (Acapella)
- Glenn Schick – mastering
- Sum1 – vocals on "DripDemeanor"
- Timbaland – production on "DripDemeanor", "Why I Still Love You", and "Why I Still Love You" (Acapella)
- Federico Vindver – co-production on "Why I Still Love You" and "Why I Still Love You" (Acapella)
- Finis "KY" White – mixing

== Charts ==
Chart performance of Iconology
| Chart (2019) | Peak position |
|---|---|
| Canadian Albums (Billboard) | 52 |
| Swiss Albums (Schweizer Hitparade) | 68 |
| US Billboard 200 | 24 |
| US Top R&B/Hip-Hop Albums (Billboard) | 15 |
