= Throw It Back =

2019 song by Missy Elliott

Single by Missy Elliott

from the EP Iconology
- Released: August 23, 2019
- Genre: Hip hop
- Length: 3:13
- Label: Atlantic
- Songwriters: Michael Aristotle; William Jared Buggs; Missy Elliott; Quintin Ernest Talbert
- Producer: Willi Hendrix

Missy Elliott singles chronology
"I'm Better" (2017)	"Throw It Back" (2019)	"DripDemeanor" (2019)

Music video
- "Throw It Back" on YouTube

"Throw It Back" is a song recorded by American rapper Missy Elliott for her first extended play Iconology (2019). The song was released as EP's lead single on August 23, 2019.

== Composition ==
"Throw It Back" was written by Elliott, Quintin Ernest Talbert, Michael Aristotle, and William Jared Buggs, while production was handled by Willi Hendrix. Musically, "Throw It Back" has been described as a "woozy, futuristic romp" containing "distorted bass lines", frenetic production", and trap snares. Lyrically, "Throw It Back" contains references to Elliott's history, as well as previous collaborators Tweet and Heavy D, and Elliott's 2002 single "Work It".

== Critical reception ==
Jordan Darville of The Fader, named "Throw It Back" "the standout track" from Iconology.

== Music video ==
A music video for "Throw It Back" was released alongside Iconology. It contains a guest appearance from Teyana Taylor. The video begins with a young girl waking up in a museum with paintings of the rapper. After entering a foggy room, Elliott appears with several dancers and cheerleaders in colorful outfits and afros. The video also contains references to Elliott's career, similar to the lyrical content. Anika Reed of USA Today described the video as "[showing] Elliott's unwavering authenticity" and "celebrating blackness". Katherine J. Igoe, writing for Marie Claire, called the video "a complete return to form" for Elliott.

== Personnel ==
Adapted from Iconology's liner notes.

- Missy Elliott – lead artist, songwriter
- Michael Aristotle – songwriter
- Quintin Ernest Talbert – songwriter
- Wili Hendrix – production
- Chris Godbey – engineering
- Glenn Schick – mastering
- Finis "KY" White – mixing

== Charts ==
Chart (2019)	Peak position
Canadian Hot Digital Song Sales (Billboard)	34
New Zealand Hot Singles (RMNZ)	37
Scotland Singles (OCC)	83
UK Singles Downloads (OCC)	57
US Bubbling Under Hot 100 (Billboard)	1
US Digital Song Sales (Billboard)	24
US Hot R&B/Hip-Hop Songs (Billboard)	37

== Release history ==
List of release dates, showing region, formats, label, and reference
Region	Date	Format(s)	Label	Ref.
United States	August 23, 2019	Digital download	Atlantic	
