= The Things That You Do =

1996 single by Gina Thompson

Single by Gina Thompson featuring Missy Elliott

from the album Nobody Does It Better
- Released: July 16, 1996
- Recorded: 1995–1996
- Genre: R&B; hip-hop soul
- Length: 4:33 (remix album version); 4:09 (album version); 3:44 (remix radio edit)
- Label: Mercury
- Songwriters: Rodney Jerkins; Melissa Elliott; Daron Jones; Paul Simon
- Producers: Puff Daddy; Rodney Jerkins

Gina Thompson singles chronology
"The Things That You Do" (1996)	"You Bring the Sunshine" (1997)

Missy Elliott singles chronology
"Ooh, Ooh Baby" (1996)	"The Things That You Do" (1996)	"Steelo" (1996)

"The Things That You Do" is a song by American R&B singer Gina Thompson from her debut album, Nobody Does It Better (1996). The single version was released as the Bad Boy Remix featuring Missy Elliott, who gained notability and mainstream attention for her unique signature, "hee-hee-how" punchline. Elliott's contribution managed to help the single crack the top 20 on the US Billboard Hot R&B/Hip-Hop Songs chart, where it peaked at number 12 and spent a total of 29 weeks. The song also appeared on the Billboard Hot 100 and Cash Box Top 100 charts, where it peaked at number 41 and 35.

In 2007, the song's chorus was sampled and covered by American musical duo Nina Sky in DJ Envy & Red Café's single, "Things You Do".

== Music video ==
A music video for the well-known "Bad Boy Remix" version was filmed in New York City in the summer of 1996 and was directed by Andras Mahr. This version, like the single, also received heavy airplay on BET and MTV. The video features appearances by Sean "Diddy" Combs (then known as Puff Daddy), The Notorious B.I.G. and Rodney Jerkins. Missy Elliott also performs her rap in the video.

== Track listings and formats ==
UK CD single

1. "Things That You Do" (Bad Boy Remix) (Club Mix) — 4:32
2. "Things That You Do" (Bad Boy Remix) (Instrumental) — 4:32
3. "Things That You Do" (Bad Boy Remix) (Acapella) — 3:24
4. "Things That You Do" (Album Version) — 4:07

US 12" vinyl

1. "The Things That You Do" (Bad Boy Remix / Club Mix) — 4:32
2. "The Things That You Do" (Bad Boy Remix / Instrumental) — 4:32
3. "The Things That You Do" (Bad Boy Remix / Acapella) — 3:42
4. "The Things That You Do" — 4:36
5. "The Things That You Do" (Instrumental) — 4:40
6. "The Things That You Do" (Acapella) — 4:32

US cassette tape

1. "The Things That You Do" (Darkchild Radio) (featuring Craig Mack, Mr. Mike Nitty & Raekwon) — 4:03
2. "The Things That You Do" (Bad Boy Remix with Rap) (featuring Missy Elliott) — 3:43

US CD/Maxi-single

1. "The Things That You Do" (Darkchild Radio) (featuring Craig Mack, Mr. Mike Nitty & Raekwon the Chef) — 4:03
2. "The Things That You Do" (Darkchild Remix) (featuring Craig Mack, Mr. Mike Nitty & Raekwon the Chef) — 6:00
3. "The Things That You Do" (Darkchild Instrumental) — 5:55
4. "The Things That You Do" (Bad Boy Remix/Club Mix) (featuring Missy Elliott) — 4:32
5. "The Things That You Do" (Bad Boy Remix/Instrumental) — 4:32

== Charts ==
Chart (1996)	Peak position
US Billboard Hot 100	41
US Hot R&B Singles (Billboard)	12
US Hot Dance Music/Maxi-Singles Sales (Billboard)	3
US Cash Box Top 100	35
