= Da Real World =

Studio album by Missy "Misdemeanor" Elliott
- Released: June 22, 1999
- Recorded: 1998–1999
- Studios: Master Sound Studios (Virginia Beach, Virginia)
- Genres: Hip hop; R&B
- Length: 62:00
- Labels: Goldmind; East West; Elektra
- Producer: Timbaland

Missy "Misdemeanor" Elliott chronology
Supa Dupa Fly (1997)	Da Real World (1999)	Miss E... So Addictive (2001)

Singles from Da Real World
- 1. "She's a Bitch" Released: April 20, 1999; 2. "All n My Grill" Released: September 13, 1999; 3. "Hot Boyz" Released: November 9, 1999

Da Real World is the second studio album by American rapper Missy "Misdemeanor" Elliott, released on June 22, 1999, by East West, Elektra, and The Goldmind. The album is noted for adding a raunchier and darker style to Elliott's music, as well as including the overt political use of the term "bitch". The album features guest appearances from B.G., Juvenile, Lil' Mo, Nicole, Beyoncé, Eve, Eminem, Lady Saw, Da Brat, Aaliyah, Big Boi of Outkast, Lil' Kim, MC Solaar, and Redman.

The album debuted at number ten on the US Billboard 200 chart. The album was certified platinum by the Recording Industry Association of America (RIAA). It spawned the singles "She's a Bitch", "All N My Grill", and "Hot Boyz (Remix)".

== Background ==
Originally titled She's a Bitch, Elliott commented on the choice for the title as a positive way of expressing herself as a "strong woman in power"; she also stated that she felt very pressured while recording this album, and explained that she was afraid of experiencing a sophomore slump. Elliott dedicated the album to the victims of the Columbine High School massacre.

== Singles ==
On March 4, 1999, "She's a Bitch" was sent to local radio stations in the United States as the lead single for the album. Elliott went on to release two additional singles: "All n My Grill" and "Hot Boyz (Remix)", featuring Eve, Nas, and Lil' Mo.

== Critical reception ==
Professional ratings
Review scores
Source	Rating
AllMusic	4/5 stars
Entertainment Weekly	A−
The Guardian	4/5 stars
Los Angeles Times	3.5/4 stars
Muzik	5/5 stars
NME	7/10
Pitchfork	8.0/10
Q	4/5 stars
Rolling Stone	3/5 stars
Spin	8/10

Da Real World received critical acclaim from music critics. Keith Farley of AllMusic declared it an "excellent follow-up" and added that "it's clearly a Missy Elliott album in most respects, with Timbaland's previously trademarked, futuristic-breakbeat production smarts laced throughout." Entertainment Weekly felt that "Da Real World marks steps in several right directions — both for rap and for understanding the never-ending battle of the sexes."

Touré of Rolling Stone compared the album to George Lucas's epic space opera Star Wars: Episode I – The Phantom Menace (1999) and wrote: "Da Real World is much-anticipated and futuristic, with a hype that outstrips the reality. The concept is more interesting than the execution." He added that "even if Da Real World isn't a successful one, the album, somewhat, recalls Queen Latifah."

In 2025, Pitchfork placed it at number 42 on their list of the "100 Best Rap Albums of All Time". The website's writer David Drake said: ''Da Real World is Missy's most underrated and best articulation of the rap album as an art of its own. Its hits were modest, but Timbaland and Missy Elliott saw no toolkit as off-limits, two pure creatives behind the curtain building out a world of unpredictable, spirited generosity.

== Commercial performance ==
Da Real World debuted at number ten on the US Billboard 200 chart, becoming Elliott's second top-ten debut and staying on the chart for a total of 39 weeks. On February 4, 2000, the album was certified platinum by the Recording Industry Association of America (RIAA) for sales of over a million copies in the United States. As of November 2015, the album has sold 1,068,000 copies in the US.

== Track listing ==
All songs produced by Timbaland. Credits adapted from the album's liner notes.

No.	Title	Writer(s)	Length
1.	"Mysterious" (Intro)		1:07
2.	"Beat Biters"	Melissa Elliott; Timothy Mosley	4:24
3.	"Busa Rhyme" (featuring Eminem)	Elliott; Mosley; Marshall Mathers; Rob Parissi	5:01
4.	"All n My Grill" (featuring Big Boi and Nicole Wray)	Elliott; Mosley; Antwan Patton	4:44
5.	"Dangerous Mouths" (featuring Redman)	Elliott; Mosley; Reggie Noble	3:29
6.	"Hot Boyz"	Elliott; Mosley	3:36
7.	"You Don't Know" (featuring Lil' Mo)	Elliott; Mosley; Cynthia Loving	4:48
8.	"Mr. D.J." (featuring Lady Saw)	Elliott; Mosley; Marion Hall	4:30
9.	"Checkin' for You (Interlude)" (featuring Lil' Kim)	Elliott; Mosley; Kimberly Jones	2:09
10.	"Stickin' Chickens" (featuring Aaliyah and Da Brat)	Elliott; Mosley; Shawntae Harris	4:55
11.	"Smooth Chick"	Elliott; Mosley	4:18
12.	"We Did It"	Elliott; Mosley	3:51
13.	"Throw Your Hands Up (Interlude)" (featuring Lil' Kim)	Elliott; Mosley; Jones	1:18
14.	"She's a Bitch"	Elliott; Mosley	4:00
15.	"U Can't Resist" (featuring Juvenile and B.G.)	Elliott; Mosley; Terius Gray; Christopher Dorsey	4:37
16.	"Crazy Feelings" (featuring Beyoncé)	Elliott; Mosley	4:34
17.	"Religious Blessings" (Outro)		0:39
Total length:			62:00

Europe bonus track
No.	Title	Writer(s)	Length
18.	"All n My Grill" (featuring MC Solaar and Nicole Wray)	Elliott; Mosley	4:47
Total length:			66:47

Sample credits

- "Busa Rhyme" contains an interpolation of "Play That Funky Music", written by Rob Parissi.
- "Dangerous Mouths" contains an interpolation of "I Wonder If I Take You Home", written by Curt Bedeau, Gerry Charles, Hugh L Clarke, Brian George, Lucien George, Paul George.

== Charts ==
=== Weekly charts ===
Weekly chart performance for Da Real World
Chart (1999)	Peak position
Canada Top Albums/CDs (RPM)	43
Dutch Albums (Album Top 100)	57
French Albums (SNEP)	51
German Albums (Offizielle Top 100)	20
Swedish Albums (Sverigetopplistan)	59
Swiss Albums (Schweizer Hitparade)	42
UK Albums (Official Charts)	42
UK R&B Albums (Official Charts)	5
US Billboard 200	10
US Top R&B/Hip-Hop Albums (Billboard)	1

=== Year-end charts ===
Year-end chart performance for Da Real World
Chart (1999)	Position
US Billboard 200	122
US Top R&B/Hip-Hop Albums (Billboard)	41

== Certifications ==
Certifications for Da Real World
Region	Certification	Certified units/sales
United Kingdom (BPI)	Silver	60,000^{^}
United States (RIAA)	Platinum	1,068,000
^{^} Shipments figures based on certification alone.

== Release history ==
Release dates and formats for Da Real World
Region	Date	Format	Label
United States	June 22, 1999	CD single; cassette	The Goldmind; Elektra
United Kingdom	June 24, 1999	CD single; cassette	The Goldmind; Elektra

== See also ==
- List of number-one R&B albums of 1999 (U.S.)
