= The Road to Stardom with Missy Elliott =

- Genre: Reality competition
- Starring: Missy Elliott
- Country of origin: United States
- No. of seasons: 1
- No. of episodes: 10

Original release
- Network: UPN
- Release: January 5 – March 2, 2005

The Road to Stardom With Missy Elliott is a competitive reality television show that aired on UPN from January 5 to March 2, 2005. The main judge and host was hip-hop artist Missy Elliott. Other judges were singer-producer Teena Marie, producer Dallas Austin, and manager Mona Scott.

== Contestants ==
- Akil: 23-year-old teacher from Jersey City, New Jersey
- Cori Yarckin: 21-year-old recent college graduate from Orlando, Florida
- Deltrice: 23-year-old clothing designer from San Francisco
- Eddie: 25-year-old construction worker from New Orleans
- Frank B: 21-year-old construction worker from Brooklyn, New York
- Heather Bright: 22-year-old student from Boston
- Jessica Betts: 23-year-old writer from Chicago
- Marcus: 24-year-old security guard from Houston
- Matthew: 25-year-old theme park entertainer from Orlando, Florida
- Melissa: 19-year-old student from Plymouth, Minnesota
- Nic: 29-year-old disc jockey from Aliso Viejo, California
- Nilyne Fields: 23-year-old make-up artist/student from Plainfield, New Jersey
- Yelawolf: 24-year-old contract artist (mural painting) from Rainbow City, Alabama

Jessica Betts was named the Season 1 winner. The show was not picked up for a second season.
