= Missy Elliott production discography =

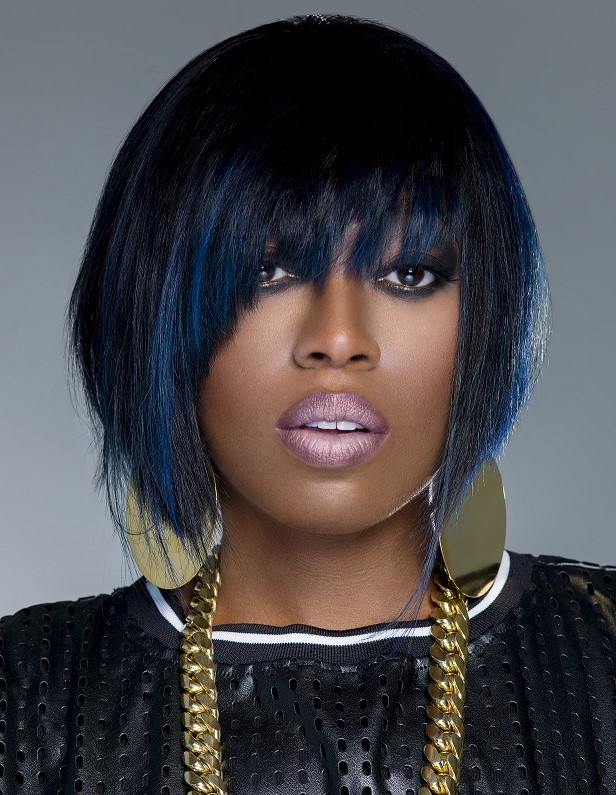
Missy Elliott in 2010

The following is a discography of songs with production and writing credits from American rapper Missy Elliott, sorted by album, date, and title.

== 1993 ==
Raven-Symoné – Here's to New Dreams

- 01. "That's What Little Girls Are Made of" (featuring Missy Elliott) (co-produced by Chad "Dr. Ceuss" Elliott)

== 1995 ==
Tony Thompson – Sexsational

- 10. "Slave" (produced by DeVante Swing, additional production & written by Missy Elliott)

Jason Weaver – Stay with Me (EP)

- 02. "U R the 1" (writing credit)

Jodeci – The Show, the After Party, the Hotel

- 06. "S-More" (writing credit)

Various – Dangerous Minds soundtrack

- 02. Aaron Hall – "Curiosity"

== 1996 ==
702 – No Doubt

(writing credit solely)

- 01. "Get Down Like Dat"
- 02. "Steelo"
- 05. "Not Gonna"
- 07. "Round & Round"

Aaliyah – One in a Million

(writing credit solely)

- 01. "Beats 4 da Streets (Intro)"
- 02. "Hot like Fire"
- 03. "One in a Million"
- 04. "A Girl Like You" (featuring Treach)
- 05. "If Your Girl Only Knew"
- 08. "4 Page Letter"
- 13. "Heartbroken"
- 14. "Never Comin' Back"
- 15. "Ladies in da House"

Busta Rhymes – It's a Party (Vinyl)

- 02. "It's a Party (AllStar Remix)" [featuring SWV] (writing credit)

Ginuwine – Ginuwine...The Bachelor

- 09. "I'll Do Anything/I'm Sorry" (writing credit)
- 12. "G. Thang" (writing credit)

== 1997 ==
Tha Truth – Makin' Moves

(writing credit solely)

- 01. "Makin' Moves"
- 02. "Gotta Find... (A New Love)"
- 03. "I Wanna Know"
- 07. "Don't Rush"
- 08. "U Better Be Ready"
- 09. "Candy"
- 10. "How We Roll"
- 11. "Red Lights"/"Bustin Out (On Funk)" (featuring Erick Sermon)

Shades – Shades

- 05. "Why" (writing credit)

Adina Howard – Welcome to Fantasy Island

- 05. "Crank Me Up" (co-produced by Majesty)

Mariah Carey – Butterfly

- 07. "Babydoll" (produced by Cory Rooney, additional production & lyrics co-written by Missy Elliott)

Puff Daddy & the Family – No Way Out

- 10. "It's All About the Benjamins" (featuring Lil' Kim, The L.O.X. & The Notorious B.I.G.) (uncredited vocal arrangement)

SWV – Release Some Tension

- 02. "Release Some Tension" (featuring Foxy Brown) (re-purposed from b-side "Release the Tension" from the "Sock It 2 Me" single)

Timbaland & Magoo – Welcome to Our World

- 01. "Beep Beep" (sampling credit)

== 1998 ==
Various – Cousin Skeeter

- 00. 702 – "Cousin Skeeter (Theme)"
  - Sample credit: 702 – "Steelo"

Elusion – Think About It

- 02. "Good & Plenty" (writing credit)
  - Sample credit: Missy Elliott – "I'm Talkin'"

MC Lyte – Seven & Seven

- 01. "In My Business" (co-produced by Dynamic Duo)
- 02. "Too Fly" (featuring Pam from Total) (co-produced by Dynamic Duo)
- 12. "Want What I Got" (featuring Missy Elliott & Mocha) (co-produced by Dynamic Duo)

Nicole – Make It Hot

- 02. "Seventeen" (co-produced by Gerard "Soundman" Thomas & Donald "Lenny" Holmes)
- 03. "In da Street" (featuring Missy Elliott & Mocha) (co-produced by Gerard Thomas & Donald Holmes)
- 09. "Nervous" (featuring Lil' Mo) (co-produced by Gerard Thomas & Donald Holmes)
- 11. "Boy You Should Listen" (co-produced by Gerard Thomas & Donald Holmes)

Total – Kima, Keisha, and Pam

- 01. "Trippin'" (featuring Missy Elliott) (produced with Darryl Pearson, co-production by Timbaland, Puff Daddy & Mario Winans)
- 02. "I Tried"
- 03. "Rock Track" (writing credit)
- 10. "There Will Be No #!*@ Tonight! (Interlude)"
- 11. "Do Something" (featuring Missy Elliott & Mocha)
- 15. "I Don't Wanna"
- 16. "Move Too Fast"
- 17. "Bet She Can't"

Timbaland – Tim's Bio: Life from da Bassment

- 13. "Talking on the Phone" (Kelly Price featuring Missy Elliott and Lil' Man) (co-production)
- 15. "John Blaze" (Aaliyah featuring Missy Elliott) (co-production)
- 17. "3:30 in the Morning" (co-production)

Whitney Houston – My Love Is Your Love

- 06. "In My Business" (featuring Missy Elliott) (co-produced by Kelvin Bradshaw & Lloyd Turner)
- 08. "Oh Yes" (co-produced by Kelvin Bradshaw & Lloyd Turner)

Yo Yo – Ebony

- 10. "I Would If I Could" (featuring Missy Elliott) (writing credit)

Various – Why Do Fools Fall in Love soundtrack

- 01. Gina Thompson with Mocha – "Why Do Fools Fall in Love" (co-produced by Timbaland)
- 02. Destiny's Child – "Get on da Bus" (co-produced by Timbaland)
- 03. Coko & Missy Elliott– "He Be Back" (co-produced by Timbaland)
- 05. Missy Elliott & Busta Rhymes – "Get Contact" (co-produced by Timbaland)
- 06. Lil' Mo – "5 Minutes" (co-produced by Dynamic Duo}
- 07. Melanie B. – "I Want You Back" (co-produced by Dynamic Duo}
- 08. Mista – "About You" (co-produced by Brian Alexander}
- 12. Total with Missy Elliott– "What the Dealio" (co-produced by Timbaland)

== 1999 ==
Destiny's Child – The Writing's on the Wall

- 04. "Confession" (featuring Missy Elliott) (co-produced by Gerard Thomas & Lenny Holmes)

702 – 702

- 02. "Where My Girls At" (co-produced by Rapture & E. Seats)
- 09. "Gotta Leave" (co-produced by Rapture & E. Seats)

Nas – I Am...

- 08. "You Won't See Me Tonight" (featuring Aaliyah) (writing credit)

== 2000 ==
Take 5 – Against All Odds

- 02. "Hottie" (writing credit)
  - Originally recorded by *NSYNC

Tamar – Tamar

- 03. "No Disrespect" {co-produced by Co-Stars}

Tamia – A Nu Day

- 03. "Can't Go for That" {co-produced by B!nk}
  - Sample credit: Hall & Oates – "I Can't Go For That (No Can Do)"
- 06. "Long Distance Love" {co-produced by Poppi}
- 08. "Wanna Be" {co-produced by B!nk}
- 10. "Can't No Man" {co-produced by Poppi}

Various – Bait soundtrack

- 07. Total w/ Missy Elliott– "Quick Rush"

=== Various - Any Given Sunday soundtrack ===
- 01. Missy Elliott - "Who You Gonna Call"?

Various – Romeo Must Die soundtrack

- 06. Aaliyah – "Are You Feelin' Me?" (writing credit)

== 2001 ==
=== Various - Lara Croft: Tomb Raider soundtrack ===
- 06. Missy Elliott & Nelly Furtado - "Get Ur Freak On (Remix)" {co-produced by Timbaland}

Various – Moulin Rouge! soundtrack

- 02. Christina Aguilera, Pink, Mýa & Lil' Kim – "Lady Marmalade" {co-produced by Rockwilder}

Aaliyah – Aaliyah

- 06. "I Care 4 U" (writing credit)

Mary J. Blige – No More Drama

- 13. "Never Been" {co-produced by Charlamagne}

Bubba Sparxxx – Dark Days, Bright Nights

- 03. "Ugly" (featuring Timbaland & Tweet) (writing and sample credit)
  - Sample credit: Missy Elliott – "Get Ur Freak On"

== 2002 ==
Karen Clark Sheard – 2nd Chance

- 02. "Only Call on Jesus"
- 06. "Higher Ground" (featuring Yolanda Adams, Kim Burrell, Dorinda Clark Cole, Mary Mary, Tweet & Missy Elliott)

Me'Shell Ndegeocello – Cookie: The Anthropological Mixtape

- 16. "Pocketbook (Remix)" [featuring Tweet & Redman] (co-produced by Rockwilder)

TLC – 3D

- 09. "Dirty Dirty" (co-produced by Timbaland)

Trina – Diamond Princess

- 09. "No Panties" (featuring Tweet)

Tweet – Southern Hummingbird

- 13. "Call Me" (writing credit)
- 17. "Big Spender" (produced with Troy Johnson)
  - Sample credit: Sweet Charity Original Broadway Album – "Big Spender"

Whitney Houston – Just Whitney

- 03. "Things You Say" (co-produced by CKB)

== 2003 ==
Beyoncé – Dangerously in Love

- 08. "Signs" (featuring Missy Elliott) (co-produced by Craig Brockman & Nisan Stewart)

Lil' Mo – Meet the Girl Next Door

- 03. "Doing Me Wrong" (co-produced by Walter "Lil' Walt" Millsap III)

Sticky Fingaz – Decade: "...but wait it gets worse"

- 04. "Can't Call It" (writing credit)

Karen Clark Sheard – The Heavens Are Telling

- 07. "Go Ahead" (featuring Missy Elliott)

Missy Elliott – This Is Not a Test!

- 05. "Is This Our Last Time" (featuring Fabolous) (co-produced by Soul Diggaz)
  - Sample credit: Shalamar – "Second Time Around"
- 07. "Dats What I'm Talkin About" (featuring R. Kelly) (co-produced by Craig Brockman & Nisan Stewart
- 12. "It's Real" (co-produced by Craig Brockman)
  - Sample credit: Rufus & Chaka Khan – "Have a Good Time"
- 15. "I'm Not Perfect" (featuring The Clark Sisters) (co-produced by Craig Brockman & Nisan Stewart)
  - Sample credit: "This Christmas"

Monica – After the Storm

- 01. "Intro"
- 02. "Get It Off" (featuring Dirtbag) (co-produced by DJ Scratchator)
  - Sample credit: Strafe – "Set It Off"
- 03. "So Gone" (co-produced by Spike & Jamahl)
  - Sample credit: The Whispers – "You Are Number One"
- 06. "Knock Knock" (co-produced by Kanye West)
  - Sample credit: The Masqueraders – "It's a Terrible Thing to Waste Your Love"
- 13. "Outro" (co-produced by Craig Brockman)

Mýa – Moodring

- 01. "My Love Is Like...Wo" (co-produced by CKB, additional production by Ron Fair)
- 04. "Step" (co-produced by Timbaland)

Madonna - American Dream

- 00. "American Dream (Missy Remix)"

Various – Honey soundtrack

- 01. Missy Elliott - "Hurt Sumthin'"
- 08. Tweet with Missy Elliott - "Thugman"

Various – The Fighting Temptations soundtrack

- 01. "Fighting Temptation" (Beyoncé, Missy Elliott, MC Lyte & Free)
  - Sample credit: Uncle Louie – "I Like Funky Music"

== 2004 ==
Angie Stone – Stone Love

- 04. "U-Haul" (co-produced by Craig Brockman & Nisan Stewart)

Ciara – Goodies

- 02. "1, 2 Step" (co-written by Ciara & Jazze Pha)

Fantasia Barrino – Free Yourself

- 02. "Free Yourself" (co-produced by Craig Brockman)
- 04. "Selfish (I Want You to Myself)" (featuring Missy Elliott)
- 09. "Good Lovin'"

213 – The Hard Way

- 19. "So Fly"
  - Sample credit: Monica – "So Gone"

Various – Shark's Tale

- 02. "Car Wash" - Christina Aguilera with Missy Elliott (additional production by Christina Aguilera, Ron Fair, T. Herzberg, C. Styles, Bang Out, Silence)

== 2005 ==
Missy Elliott – The Cookbook

- 04. "Lose Control" (featuring Ciara & Fatman Scoop)
  - Sample credit: Cybotron – "Clear", Hot Streak – "Body Work"
- 09. "Remember When"

Tweet – It's Me Again

- 02. "Turn da Lights Off" (featuring Missy Elliott) (co-produced by Kwamé)
  - Sample credit: Nat King Cole's – "Lost April", Marvin Gaye and Tammi Terrell – "If This World Were Mine"
- 05. "You" (co-produced by Soul Diggaz)
  - Sample credit: Louis Armstrong – "Stardust"
- 07. "Things I Don't Mean" (featuring Missy Elliott) (co-produced by Craig Brockman)
- 08. "My Man" (co-produced by Craig Brockman)
- 09. "Sports, Sex & Food" (co-produced by Soul Diggaz)
  - Sample credit: The Meters – "Hey Pocky A-Way"
- 16. "We Don't Need No Water" (featuring Missy Elliott)
  - Sample credit: Rock Master Scott & the Dynamic Three – "The Roof Is on Fire", Mandrill – "Mango Meat"

== 2006 ==
Fantasia – Fantasia

- 08. "I'm Not That Type" (co-produced by Lamb)
- 10. "Two Weeks Notice" (co-produced by Craig Brockman)
- 14. "Bump What Your Friends Say" (co-produced by Soul Diggaz, Phil Lees)

Monica – The Makings of Me

- 02. "Dozen Roses (You Remind Me)" (co-produced by David "Davey Boy" Lindsey & Cliff Jones)
  - Sample credit: Curtis Mayfield – "The Makings of You"
- 06. "Doin' Me Right" (co-produced by Lamb & Miguel "Pro" Castro)
  - Sample credit: The Whispers – "Chocolate Girl"
- 09. "Gotta Move on" (co-produced by Craig Brockman)

== 2007 ==
Keyshia Cole – Just Like You

- 03. "Let It Go" (featuring Missy Elliott & Lil' Kim)
  - Sample credit: Mtume – "Juicy Fruit", Yarborough and Peoples – "Don't Stop the Music"

== 2008 ==
Jazmine Sullivan – Fearless

- 02. "Need U Bad" (co-produced by Lamb)
  - Sample credit: Nicholas Taylor Stanton – "Higher Mediation Riddim Version", Tapper Zukie – "Papa Big Shirt"
- 08. "Dream Big" (co-produced by Lamb)
  - Sample credit: Daft Punk – "Veridis Quo"

Jennifer Hudson – Jennifer Hudson

- 08. "I'm His Only Woman" (featuring Fantasia Barrino) (co-produced by Jack Splash)

Jessica Betts – Jessie Pearl

- 03. "Block"
- 05. "Whisper"
  - Sample credit: Ying Yang Twins – "Wait (The Whisper Song)"
- 08. "Moon" (co-produced by Soul Diggaz)

== 2009 ==
Angie Stone – Unexpected

- 10. "Think Sometimes"

== 2010 ==
Monica – Still Standing

- 03. "Everything to Me" (co-produced by Lamb)
  - Sample credit: Deniece Williams – "Silly"
- 06. "If You Were My Man" (co-produced by Lamb)
  - Sample credit: Evelyn "Champagne" King – "Betcha She Don't Love You"
- 11. "Blackberry"

Jazmine Sullivan – Love Me Back

- 01. "Holding You Down (Goin' In Circles)" (co-produced by Lamb)
  - Sample credit: Slick Rick & Doug E. Fresh – "La Di Da Di", Mary J. Blige – "Be Happy", Audio Two – "Top Billin'", Biz Markie – "Make the Music with Your Mouth, Biz", Nas – "Affirmative Action"
- 07. "Excuse Me" (co-produced by Lamb)
  - Sample credit: The Manhattans – "Take It or Leave It"
- 12. "Luv Back"

== 2012 ==
Monica – New Life

- 08. "Until It's Gone"
- 16. "Anything (To Find You)" (featuring Rick Ross)
  - Sample credit: The Notorious B.I.G. – "Who Shot Ya

== 2014 ==
Sharaya J – Takin' It No More single

- 01. "Takin' It No More" (additional production, produced by DJ Jayhood)
  - Sample credit: Missy Elliott – "Take Away" (featuring Ginuwine & Kameelah "Meelah" Williams of 702)
- 02. "Shut It Down" (co-produced by Aaron "Dboy" Monroe)

Missy Elliott – Block Party

- 00. "9th Inning" (featuring Timbaland) (additional production, produced by Timbaland & Jerome "J-Roc" Harmon)
- 00. "Pin the Tail" (co-produced by Timbaland)
- 00. "Blow Ya Whistle" (co-produced by Souldiggaz)
- 00. "Talk a Lotta Trash" (co-produced by Alicia "4Bia" Cherry)
- 00. "Pre Madonna/Prima Donna" (co-produced by Timbaland)
- 00. "Bounce It Up and Down" (co-produced by Timbaland)
- 00. "Rather" (co-produced by Lamb)

== 2015 ==
Monica – Code Red

- 00. "Code Red" (featuring Missy Elliott & Laiyah Brown)
- 00. "I Love Him"

== 2016 ==
Tweet — Charlene

- 06. "Somebody Else Will" (featuring Missy Elliott) (co-produced by Timbaland)

Fifth Harmony — 7/27

- 10. "Not That Kinda Girl" (featuring Missy Elliott) (writing credit)

== 2019 ==
Missy Elliott – Iconology

- 01. "Throw It Back" (writing credit)
- 02. "Cool Off" (writing credit)
- 03. "DripDemeanor" (featuring Sum1) (writing credit) + (co-produced by Timbaland)
- 04. "Why I Still Love You" (writing credit)
- 05. "Why I Still Love You" (Acapella) (writing credit)

== 2020 ==
Toni Braxton – Spell My Name

- 02. "Do It (Remix)" (featuring Missy Elliott) (co-produced by Hannon Lane)

Bad Bunny – YHLQMDLG

- 13. "Safaera" (writing credit)

== 2023 ==
Various – The Color Purple soundtrack

- 23. Halle Bailey – "Keep Pushin'" (Missy Elliott Remix)
- 27. Fantasia, Shenseea – "Hell No!" (Reprise) (Missy Elliott Remix)

== Unreleased / Non-album songs ==
702

- "Speakers Blow" (featuring Missy Elliott)
- "Gotta Leave (Remix)" (featuring Missy Elliott)

Aaliyah

- "Sugar & Spice" (featuring Missy Elliott & Timbaland) (writing credit)
- "Where Could He Be" (featuring Missy Elliott & Tweet) (co-produced by Bink)
  - Sample credit: Lisa Stansfield – "All Around the World"

Blaque

- 02. "Ugly" (featuring Missy Elliott) (co-produced by CKB, Craig Brockman, Dante Nolen, Nisan Stewart)
- 03. "Freakazoid"
- 09. "Nappy Dugout"
- 10. "Dat's Right"
- 15. "No Ganksta"
- 00. "Lingerie"

Cheri Dennis

- "Wrapped Around Me" (co-produced by Timbaland)

Eminem

- "Tylenol Island" (co-produced by Timbaland)
  - Sample credit: Nicole Wray – "Bangin' (Don't Lie)"

Fantasia

- "Clap Ya Hands" (featuring Missy Elliott)
- "Turn This Party Up" (featuring Missy Elliott)
- "No Stoppin'"

Janet Jackson

- "Nasty Girl 2000" (featuring Missy Elliott & Aaliyah)
- "Almond Joy" (co-produced by Nisan Stewart)

Jazmine Sullivan

- 00. "Break My Little Heart"
- 00. "Don't Let Me Get Started"
- 00. "Feel Nice"
- 00. "Backstabbers" (co-produced by Timbaland)
- 00. "Where Did He Go? (Bus Stop)"

Jessica Betts

- "You Don't Have To" (co-produced by Souldiggaz)

Missy Elliott

- "What U Say" (featuring LaTocha Scott)
- "Come On Back"
- "Release the Tension"
- "Can We" (SWV demo)
- "Drop tha Bomb"
- "Let's Get Married" (co-produced by Timbaland)
- "It's a Woman's World"
- "Sexy Enough" (featuring Free & Raje Shwari)
- "Pussycat" (Remix) (featuring Janet Jackson & Lil' Kim)
- "Swing Your Partner" (featuring Eve)
- "I Want You Back" (Mel B demo)

Mocha

- "I Know Whutchu Like" (featuring Petey Pablo, Lil' Mo, & Missy Elliott) (co-produced by Rockwilder)

Monica

- "Best Friends"
- "Girl, Please"
- "No Stoppin'"
- "Let Me Know" (featuring Missy Elliott)
- "U Turn Me On" (featuring Missy Elliott)

Nicole

- 00. "Bangin' (Don't Lie)" (featuring Prodigy of Mobb Deep) (writing credit)
- 00. "Single Life (Interlude)" (featuring Missy Elliott)
- 00. "Last Night a DJ..." (featuring Missy Elliott)

Olivia

- "Cherry Pop"
- "Not Alone"
- "Right One for You"

Sarah Jo Martin

- "Fuck You" (co-produced by Timbaland)
- "I'm About to Lose It" (co-produced by Timbaland)
- "I'm Your Slave" (co-produced by Timbaland)
- "Put the Gun Down" (co-produced by Timbaland)

So Def

- "Navigator"
- "I Like It"
- "Hell Naw"
- "Happy Birthday" (featuring Izza Kizza & Missy Elliott) (co-produced by Souldiggaz)

Timbaland

- "The World Is Ours" (featuring Missy Elliott, Justin Timberlake, Kiley Dean & Bubba Sparxxx) (co-written by Justin Timberlake)

Torrey Carter

- 01. "Floss Ya Jewels"
- 02. "Take That" (featuring Missy Elliott) (co-produced by Charlamagne)
- 04. "The Life I Wanna Live" (featuring Nokio of Dru Hill) (co-produced by Nokio)
- 08. "Now I Got a Girl" (co-produced & co-written by Lil Mo)
- 09. "Same 'Ol" (featuring Missy Elliott) (co-produced by Timbaland)

Total

- "Trippin' (Missy's Mix)"

Tweet

- "Shook Up" (featuring Free)
- "Mr. DJ" (featuring Missy Elliott) (co-produced by Soul Diggaz)
- "Procrastination" (featuring Missy Elliott & Timbaland) (co-produced by Timbaland)
