= WTF (Where They From) =

2015 Missy Elliott single featuring Pharrell Williams

Single by Missy Elliott featuring Pharrell Williams
- Released: November 12, 2015
- Genre: Hip-hop
- Length: 3:12
- Label: Goldmind; Atlantic
- Songwriters: Melissa Elliott; Pharrell Williams
- Producer: Pharrell Williams

Missy Elliott singles chronology
"I Deserve It" (2014)	"WTF (Where They From)" (2015)	"This Is for My Girls" (2016)

Pharrell Williams singles chronology
"Freedom" (2015)	"WTF (Where They From)" (2015)	"Safari" (2016)

Music video
- "WTF (Where They From)" on YouTube

"WTF (Where They From)" is a song by American rapper Missy Elliott featuring American musician Pharrell Williams. Produced by Williams, it was released in 2015 as Elliott's first single and first music video, since 2008's "Shake Your Pom Pom", although she had been a featured artist on others' singles and videos and had released promotional singles, during the intervening years. The song received significant praise from critics, and was sometimes referred to as her "comeback".

== Background ==
Pick for a lead single of Elliott's seventh album stretches back as early 2008, when Elliott coined the soundtrack single "Ching-a-Ling" as a potential selection. However, by summer of that same year, Elliott decided against the idea and released the buzz record "Best, Best" instead. With "Best" servicing to minimal reaction nationwide, Elliott then entered recording sessions with recurring collaborator Pharrell Williams throughout the first quarter of 2009, as effort to produce a stronger radio single. The result was the Teyana Taylor-featured "Put It on Ya", which like its predecessor failed to gain commercial appeal; but managed to cite limited promo attention in European regions.

In 2012, in between both battling Graves' disease and contributing production for protégées Jazmine Sullivan and Sharaya J, Elliott returned to the making of her seventh album, and recruited childhood friend Timbaland to materialize the dual-promotional efforts "9th Inning" and "Triple Threat". While the songs met with lukewarm success on the digital charts, the releases failed to amass the proper impact needed to revive the "energy" of Elliott's seventh studio set. Elliott additionally had plans to release the Lil' Kim- and Eve-assisted "Murder She Wrote" as a follow-up single, however plans were ultimately shelved.

By late April 2014, reports surfaced of Elliott returning to the studio with Pharrell, in preparation of a potential collaboration. Further news circulated of the pair's work coming to light, when in April 2015, Pharrell alluded to Jimmy Fallon that new Elliott material was on the way and concluded that he "was so proud of her."

On October 26, 2015, Missy Elliott debuted a snippet of the Pharrell-produced cut "WTF" during an airing of Monday Night Football. Originally set for a release on November 13, "WTF" was released to digital outlets on November 12 at 9 a.m. EST, alongside the simultaneous release of its music video.

== Composition ==
"WTF (Where They From)" is a futuristic up-tempo number that incorporates a "drum line eseque" pattern and a trap backdrop. The song's entirety also features a female voice muttering the phrase "in person," which derives from Trayvon Martin's friend Rachel Jeantel, who uttered the wording in a 2013 interview with Huffpost Live.

== Critical reception ==
"WTF (Where They From)" received widespread praise from music critics. Maeve McDermott form USA Today named it "Song of the Week" and wrote that "after becoming a household name with a decade of classic records before stepping back for the next ten-year stretch, Missy sounds triumphant on "WTF", serving her classic sing-song braggadocio and figure-praising lyrics alongside a guest appearance from Pharrell." The Guardian writer Lanre Bakare summed: "What it is a welcome bit of weird, fun pop that exists in its own pristine bubble. Get Ur Freak On." In his review for the Los Angeles Times, Gerrick D. Kennedy wrote that "the new jam is Missy at her best. The beat is as off-kilter and futuristically funky as could be expected from a track with her name on it, and the lyrics are a barrage of tongue-twisty, nonsensical punches". Spencer Kornhaber from The Atlantic found that "no one is as reliably able and willing to start a party as Missy [...] She’s not buying melodies from Swedish pop geniuses in attempts to conquer multiple radio formats; she’s not lugging around a Narrative. She’s pure rhythm + attitude, an equation for joy. So it is on “WTF,” with its earthquaking low end and catchiness-through-elongated-syllables. Pharrell, another rap-master of body music, shows up for a verse that fits nicely into the nonsensical tapestry." Pitchfork Media awarded the song with their "Best New Track" tag, praising Elliott's comeback, the track's production and lyrical criticism of cultural appropriation, and eventually naming the track the 30th best of 2015.

Alexa Camp, author for Slant magazine, wrote that the song "pairs Pharrell's paint-can beats with deep, sinuous 808s, and if the track lacks an obvious hook, it makes up for it with sheer swagger. Of course, Missy doesn't miss a beat, spitting rhymes like it's 2005." Similarly, MTV News's Amanda Bell found that "the new Missy track is slick and stylish and all the things that made Missy slay back in the day (and now too, yay!)." Jon Blistein from Rolling Stone felt that "Elliott and Pharrell's [provide] infectious flows over the track's intergalactic production." The prestigious Village Voice named "WTF (Where They From)" the sixth-best single released in 2015 on their annual year-end critics' poll, Pazz & Jop.

== Music video ==
=== Filming background ===
Parts of the music video for "WTF (Where They From)" were filmed at the Pershing Square.

News of the video's formation first broke the air by TMZ in October 2015. The critically acclaimed "futuristic" visual features extensive directing control by Elliott's frequent collaborator Dave Meyers, alongside hyper-paced choreography by longtime friend Hi-Hat. Shooting locations included Downtown Los Angeles, Westlake, Los Angeles, Pershing Square (Los Angeles Metro station), and an "under-entrance" near Sixth Street Viaduct.

=== Synopsis ===
The Dave Meyers-directed piece opens with Downtown Los Angeles residents singing along to Elliott's "WTF" while going about their usual routines. The video then takes the viewers' attention to a glitzy-disco-cloaked Elliott dancing along an abandoned alleyway, before transitioning to rapid-paced choreography by Elliott and her background dancers. Elliott is then quickly shown rapping to the camera, where she begins to morph a cheetah-print tattoo from one side of her face to the other.

Moments later, a segment follows with Williams and Elliott as dancing marionettes rapping their verses. The remainder of the video then intercuts with Elliott and headlamp-sporting others dancing upon open boxes and moving hoverboards. Guest appearances throughout the visual's entirety comprises Les Twins and Missy Elliott's protégée Sharaya J. The marionettes were designed by the New York based Furry Puppet Studio.

=== Reception ===
Upon its release, the video received general acclaim from critics. The Guardian writer Lanre Bakare felt that "her first music video in seven years demonstrates that pop has missed Missy’s unique mix of street culture, futuristic imagery and off-kilter production." He summed it as "instantly recognizable [and] full of daft choreography". Additionally, less than 9 hours after its initial premiere, the video accumulated over 3 million views via YouTube.

== Charts ==
=== Weekly charts ===
Weekly chart performance for "WTF (Where They From)"
Chart (2015–2016)	Peak position
Australia (ARIA)	45
Australian Urban (ARIA)	4
Belgium (Ultratip Bubbling Under Flanders)	10
Belgium Urban (Ultratop Flanders)	12
Belgium (Ultratip Bubbling Under Wallonia)	45
Canada Hot 100 (Billboard)	21
France (SNEP)	73
Germany (GfK)	82
Scottish Singles Sales (Official Charts)	49
UK Singles (Official Charts)	66
UK Hip Hop/R&B (Official Charts)	9
US Billboard Hot 100	22
US Dance Club Songs (Billboard)	26
US Hot R&B/Hip-Hop Songs (Billboard)	8
US Rhythmic Airplay (Billboard)	16

=== Year-end charts ===
Year-end chart performance for "WTF (Where They From)"
Chart (2016)	Position
US Hot R&B/Hip-Hop Songs (Billboard)	78

== Certifications ==
Certifications for "WTF (Where They From)"
Region	Certification	Certified units/sales
United States (RIAA)	Platinum	1,000,000^{‡}
^{‡} Sales+streaming figures based on certification alone.

== Release history ==
Release history for "WTF (Where They From)"
Region	Date	Format(s)	Label	Ref.
Various	November 12, 2015	Digital download	Atlantic; Goldmind	
Italy	November 13, 2015	Contemporary hit radio	Warner Music	
United States	November 17, 2015	Urban radio	Atlantic	
Various	August 5, 2016	12-inch single	Atlantic	
