= Stone Love =

2004 studio album by Angie Stone

Studio album by Angie Stone
- Released: June 28, 2004
- Studios: Sho'nuff (Atlanta) (Note: Tracks 2 and 17); Jammin Downtown (New York City) (Note: Tracks 2, 3, 5, 9, 11 and 13–15); Majestic (North Hollywood, California) (Note: Tracks 3 and 12); Quad Recording (New York City) (Note: Tracks 3, 4 and 12–14); Westlake (West Hollywood, California) (Note: Track 4); The Hit Factory Criteria (Miami); Angel Baby Recording (New York City) (Note: Track 6); Conjunction (Los Angeles) (Note: Track 8); Larrabee North (North Hollywood, California); Blakeslee (North Hollywood, California) (Note: Track 10); 2 Ton Sound (New York City) (Note: Track 15)
- Length: 54:43
- Label: J
- Producers: Angie Stone; Prince Charles Alexander; Sherrod Barnes; Rufus Blaq; Craig X. Brockman; Warryn "Baby Dubb" Campbell; Missy Elliott; Andreao "Fanatic" Heard; Jazze Pha; Harold Lilly; Walter (DJ Walt) Millsap III; Jamel "Melekeyz" Oliver; Jonathan Richmond; John "Jubu" Smith; Nisan Stewart; Supa Ugly K-Love

Angie Stone chronology
| Mahogany Soul (2001) | Stone Love (2004) | Stone Hits: The Very Best of Angie Stone (2005) |

Singles from Stone Love
- 1. "I Wanna Thank Ya" Released: May 3, 2004; 2. "U-Haul" Released: July 26, 2004; 3. "Stay for a While" Released: October 11, 2004

Stone Love is the third studio album by American singer Angie Stone, released on June 28, 2004, by J Records. Originally conceived as a collaborative but introspective album which Stone planned to call Diary of a Soul Sister and was expected to feature female singers such as Gladys Knight and Chaka Khan, the album features a wide range of collaborators, including Warryn Campbell, Andreao Heard, Jazze Pha, and Missy Elliott. Duo Floetry, singers Betty Wright, Anthony Hamilton, and Snoop Dogg, as well as Stone's daughter Diamond and her former fiancée, rapper T.H.C., appear on Stone Love.

The album earned generally favorable reviews from music critics who noted its more upbeat, amorous nature and declared it another well-crafted effort from Stone. It reached number six on the Dutch Album Top 100 and entered the top twenty of the albums charts in Belgium, Finland, and Sweden. In the United States, it debuted at number 14 on the US Billboard 200. Stone Love produced three singles, including the Dance Club Songs chart-topper "I Wanna Thank Ya" as well as the Grammy Award-nominated song "U-Haul". Stone Love would mark Stone's final album with J Records.

== Background ==
As with her previous album, J Records consulted a wide ranger of producers and songwriters to work with Stone on her third solo album, including Prince Charles Alexander, Warryn Campbell, Andreao "Fanatic" Heard, Jazze Pha, and Harold Lilly as well as Missy Elliott and her producing partners Craig Brockman and Nisan Stewart. Unlike Black Diamond (1999) and Mahogany Soul though, Stone was motivated to produce a more upbeat, joyous album following the success of the Hex Hector and Mac Quayle-produced remix of her 2002 single "Wish I Didn't Miss You", telling The Advocate in 2004: "I didn't just want to appeal to the broken-spirited or the brokenhearted [but] to people that were having joy in their life."

Guest vocalists on Stone Love include rapper Snoop Dogg, Marsha Ambrosius and Natalie Stewart from English duo Floetry as well as singers Betty Wright and Anthony Hamilton which Stone cited as "natural partnerships". Stone's daughter Diamond Stone appears on the Walter Millsap III-produced "You're Gonna Get It", while her former fiancée, rapper T.H.C., appeared on "Karma". On her decision to name the album Stone Love, Stone told The San Antonio Current: "[It] encapsulates everything about love. That term to me embodies love. I find that a title is as important as the album, it connects the project. There is motherly and sisterly love, man and woman love, but no love is stronger than Stone Love."

== Promotion ==
Stone Love was preceded by its lead single "I Wanna Thank Ya". Produced by Jazze Pha, it features guest vocals from rapper Snoop Dogg and samples from Deodato's song "Skatin'" (1980), Joyce Sims's "Come into My Life" (1987), DeBarge's "All This Love" (1982) and "Take Your Time (Do It Right)" (1980) from The S.O.S. Band. Released by J Records as the album's lead single on May 3, 2004, it reached the top ten of the UK R&B Singles chart and was Stone's second single to reach number one on the US Billboard's Dance Club Songs chart.

"U-Haul", chiefly produced by Missy Elliott, was released as the album's second single on July 26, 2004. Apart from Elliott, singers Tweet and Betty Wright as well as Stone's daughter Diamond appear as backing vocalists on the song. It reached number 19 on Billboard's Adult R&B Songs. At the 47th Annual Grammy Awards, "U-Haul" was nominated for a Grammy Award for Best Female R&B Vocal Performance. Third and final single "Stay for a While", a duet with Anthony Hamilton, was issued on October 11, 2004. It peaked at number 21 on the Adult R&B Songs chart.

== Critical reception ==
Professional ratings
Aggregate scores
| Source | Rating |
|---|---|
| Metacritic | 68/100 |
Review scores
| Source | Rating |
| AllMusic | 4/5 stars |
| Blender | 4/5 stars |
| Entertainment Weekly | B |
| The Guardian | 3/5 stars |
| Los Angeles Times | 3.5/4 stars |
| MTV Asia | 6/10 |
| Rolling Stone | 3/5 stars |
| Uncut | 2/5 stars |
| Vibe | 3/5 stars |
| Yahoo! Music | 7/10 stars |

Upon its release, Stone Love received critical acclaim from music critics. At Metacritic, which assigns a normalized rating out of 100 to reviews from mainstream critics, the album has an average score of 68, based on 13 critical reviews, indicating "generally favorable reviews".

AllMusic editor Rob Theakston felt that Stone Love "pleasantly picks up where Mahogany Soul left off, presenting a wiser, more even-keel Stone putting her best foot forward right from the album's onset." He called the album Stone's "most focused and accomplished full-length to date. A delightful album for a summer day, and an enjoyable listen from start to finish." Gail Mitchell of Billboard found that "Stone's soulful, sassy vocals are once again the centerpiece of another well-crafted effort. Whether discoursing on love or heartbreak, the singer/songwriter/musician never leaves an emotional stone unturned." Robert Sandall, writing for The Daily Telegraph, felt that Stone Love differs from Stone's first two albums "principally in its upbeat, amorous mood" and that it "intricately played, [merges] old-school arrangements gracefully with modern beats. Her deceptively powerful voice, beautifully layered and never over-used, is, as ever, world class."

Entertainment Weekly's David Browne wrote that Stone Love "sways pleasurably from start to finish, buoyed by floaty old-school R&B [...] It's easy to luxuriate in its cushy production, to nod along with the occasionally clever line, or to enjoy the duo Floetry's stern-voiced harmonies [...] Everything is balmy, modestly funky – and strangely devoid of outright passion." Steve Hands from musicOMH critic found that Stone Love "neatly avoids the saccharine seasoning and horrendous filler that so bedevilled soul albums back in the day way before R&B got a healthy dose of hip-hop in its veins." He noted that while the album has its moments when you feel [Stone's] on automatic [and] it's a tad longer than it really needs to be," there "is more than enough here to wipe away the working day." People magazine remarked that "on her righteous third album, Stone continues to carve out retro-'70s R&B rich in the tradition of greats like Gladys Knight, Chaka Khan and Betty Wright."

== Chart performance ==
Stone Love debuted at number 14 on the US Billboard 200 in the week of July 24, 2004, selling 52,000 in its first week of release. The album also debuted and peaked at number four on the Top R&B/Hip-Hop Albums chart, and marked Stone's first top ten entry on the Dutch Album Top 100, peaking at number six. It also reached the top twenty of the albums charts in Belgium, Finland, and Sweden as well as on the R&B charts in Australia and the United Kingdom. Billboard ranked it 89th on its US Top R&B/Hip-Hop Albums year-end listing.

The following year, Stone asked for and was granted a release from J Records. In 2007, after signing with Stax Records, she opened up about the label change. Speaking with The Baltimore Sun, Stone said: "Originally, that album was called Diary of a Soul Sister. It was gonna be set up with me working with icons like Gladys Knight, Chaka Khan, Roberta Flack, Natalie Cole... But Alicia Keys was gonna use the title The Diary of Alicia Keys. So I was asked [by label founder Clive Davis] to change my concept. The focus was derailed on the last album, and I asked to be released after that." In his 2013 autobiography The Soundtrack of My Life, Davis contradicted Stone's impression that she had been treated unfavorably compared to Keys.

== Track listing ==
Stone Love track listing
| No. | Title | Writer(s) | Producer(s) | Length |
|---|---|---|---|---|
| 1. | "Stoned Love (Intro)" | Kenny Thomas; Frank E. Wilson | Angie Stone; Jonathan Richmond | 0:35 |
| 2. | "I Wanna Thank Ya" (featuring Snoop Dogg) | Stone; Phalon Alexander; Calvin Broadus; Joyce Sims; Eldra DeBarge | Jazze Pha | 3:47 |
| 3. | "My Man" (featuring Floetry) | Stone; Warryn Campbell; Harold Lilly; Marsha Ambrosius; Natalie Stewart | Warryn "Baby Dubb" Campbell; Lilly^{[a]} | 4:01 |
| 4. | "U-Haul" | Missy Elliott; Nisan Stewart; Craig Brockman; John Smith | Elliott; Stewart^{[a]}; Brockman^{[a]}; John "Jubu" Smith^{[a]} | 3:56 |
| 5. | "Stay for a While" (featuring Anthony Hamilton) | Stone; Richmond; Juanita Wynn; Hamilton | Stone; Richmond | 4:01 |
| 6. | "Lovers' Ghetto" | Rufus Moore; Richard Randolph; Ricky Smith; Kevin Spencer; Rod Temperton | Rufus Blaq; Prince Charles Alexander; Jamel "Melekeyz" Oliver^{[b]} | 4:05 |
| 7. | "Little Bit of This, Little Bit of That... (Interlude)" | | Stone; Richmond | 0:25 |
| 8. | "You're Gonna Get It" (featuring Diamond Stone) | Walter Millsap III; Tamara Savage; Joi Campbell; Keli Price; Thomas Bell; William Hart | Walter (DJ Walt) Millsap III | 4:15 |
| 9. | "Come Home (Live with Me)" | Stone; Courtney Terry; Keith Horne; André Previn; Dory Previn | Supa Ugly K-Love | 3:57 |
| 10. | "You Don't Love Me" | Stone; Richmond; Roger Nichols; Paul Williams | Stone; Richmond | 3:34 |
| 11. | "Remy Red" | Stone; Richmond; Wynn | Stone; Richmond | 3:50 |
| 12. | "That Kind of Love" (featuring Betty Wright) | Stone; Campbell; Lilly; Anthony Hester | Campbell; Lilly^{[a]} | 3:52 |
| 13. | "Touch It (Interlude)" | | Stone; Richmond | 1:20 |
| 14. | "Cinderella Ballin'" | Stone; Richmond; Crystal Johnson | Stone; Richmond | 4:35 |
| 15. | "Karma" (featuring T.H.C.) | Stone; Andreao Heard; Sherrod Barnes; Jerry Barnes; Berkeley Ronald Outen Jr. | Andreao "Fanatic" Heard; S. Barnes | 4:42 |
| 16. | "Wherever You Are (Outro)" | Stone | Stone; Richmond | 0:35 |
| 17. | "I Wanna Thank Ya" (No Rap) | Stone; P. Alexander; Broadus; Sims; DeBarge | Jazze Pha | 3:13 |

Notes

- ^{^[a]} signifies a co-producer
- ^{^[b]} signifies an associate producer

Sample credits

- "Stoned Love (Intro)" is a cover of the 1970 single by the Supremes.
- "I Wanna Thank Ya" contains re-sung lyrics from "Come into My Life" by Joyce Sims and interpolations of "All This Love" by DeBarge.
- "Lovers' Ghetto" contains elements from "Adventures in the Land of Music" by Dynasty and an interpolation of "Lady in My Life" by Michael Jackson.
- "You're Gonna Get It" contains samples from "La-La (Means I Love You)" by the Delfonics.
- "Come Home (Live with Me)" contains samples from "Come Live with Me" by Dorothy Ashby.
- "You Don't Love Me" contains excerpts from "We've Only Just Begun" by Curtis Mayfield.
- "That Kind of Love" contains samples from "(I'm Going By) The Stars in Your Eyes" by Ron Banks and the Dramatics.

== Personnel ==
Credits adapted from the liner notes of Stone Love.

=== Musicians ===
- Angie Stone – vocals (all tracks); background vocals (tracks 3–5, 10–14); additional keyboards (track 15)
- Snoop Dogg – vocals (track 2)
- Jazze Pha – vocal ad-libs (tracks 2, 17)
- Floetry – vocals (track 3)
- Warryn "Baby Dubb" Campbell – instruments, programming (tracks 3, 12)
- Sean Cooper – sound design (tracks 3, 12)
- Harold Lilly – background vocals (tracks 3, 12)
- Nisan Stewart – all instruments (track 4)
- Craig X. Brockman – all instruments (track 4)
- John "Jubu" Smith – all instruments (track 4)
- Missy Elliott – background vocals (track 4)
- Tweet – background vocals (track 4)
- Diamond Stone – background vocals (tracks 4, 6, 10, 12); vocals (track 8)
- Betty Wright – background vocals (track 4); vocals (track 12)
- Anthony Hamilton – vocals (track 5)
- Jonathan Richmond – all instruments (as Jon Rych) (tracks 5, 10, 11, 13, 14); background vocals (tracks 5, 10, 11, 13); additional vocal performance (track 11)
- Eric Walls – guitar (tracks 5, 8, 10)
- Juanita Wynn – background vocals (tracks 5, 11)
- Baby Paul – drum programming (track 6)
- Rufus Blaq – drum programming (track 6)
- Jamel "Melekeyz" Oliver – keyboards (track 6)
- Prince Charles Alexander – keyboards (track 6)
- Khadejia Bass – background vocals (track 6)
- Stephanie Bolton – background vocals (tracks 6, 10)
- Walter (DJ Walt) Millsap III – instruments, programming (track 8)
- Tamara Savage – background vocals (track 8)
- Joi Campbell – background vocals (track 8)
- Supa Ugly K-Love – additional programming (track 9)
- Jamal Peoples – Fender Rhodes (track 9)
- Steve Bethany – guitar (track 11)
- Crystal Johnson – background vocals (track 14)
- T.H.C. – vocals (track 15)
- Andreao "Fanatic" Heard – all instruments, programming (track 15)

=== Technical ===
- Angie Stone – production (tracks 1, 5, 7, 10, 11, 13, 14, 16); executive production
- Jonathan Richmond – production (tracks 1, 5, 7, 10, 11, 13, 14, 16)
- Jazze Pha – production (tracks 2, 17)
- Arnold Wolfe – recording (tracks 2, 17)
- Tim Donovan – recording (tracks 2, 4, 13–15); mixing (track 15)
- Yutaka Kawana – recording assistance (tracks 2, 3, 5, 11, 13–15); recording (track 9); mixing assistance (track 15)
- Serban Ghenea – mixing (tracks 2, 17)
- John Hanes – additional Pro Tools engineering (tracks 2, 17)
- Tim Roberts – engineering assistance (tracks 2, 17)
- Warryn "Baby Dubb" Campbell – production (tracks 3, 12)
- Harold Lilly – co-production (tracks 3, 12)
- Bruce Buechner – recording (tracks 3, 12)
- Ann Mincieli – recording (track 3)
- Manny Marroquin – mixing (tracks 3, 5, 8–14)
- Sandra Campbell – project coordination (tracks 3, 12)
- Alonzo Vargas – engineering assistance (tracks 3, 12)
- Missy Elliott – production (track 4)
- Nisan Stewart – co-production (track 4)
- Craig X. Brockman – co-production (track 4)
- John "Jubu" Smith – co-production (track 4)
- Carlos Bedoya – recording (track 4)
- Marcella Araica – recording assistance (track 4)
- Paul Falcone – mixing (track 4)
- Daniel "Boom" Wierup – recording (tracks 5, 11)
- Rob Barahona – recording assistance (tracks 5, 11)
- Rufus Blaq – production, recording (track 6)
- Prince Charles Alexander – production, recording, mixing (track 6)
- Jamel "Melekeyz" Oliver – associate production (track 6)
- Louis Alfred III – recording (track 6)
- Elai Tubo – recording (track 6)
- Walter (DJ Walt) Millsap III – production, recording (track 8)
- David Lopez – recording (track 8)
- Rabeka Tunei – mixing assistance (track 8)
- Supa Ugly K-Love – production (track 9)
- Andre Netto – recording assistance (track 9)
- Bill Importico – recording (track 13)
- Andreao "Fanatic" Heard – production (track 15)
- Sherrod Barnes – production (track 15)
- Eddie Krakaur – recording (track 15)
- Herb Powers Jr. – mastering
- Peter Edge – executive production

=== Artwork ===
- Alli – art direction, design
- Marc (Poppa) Baptiste – photography
- Chris LeBeau – art department production
- Racquel Honoré-Stylist

== Charts ==
=== Weekly charts ===
Weekly chart performance for Stone Love
| Chart (2004) | Peak position |
|---|---|
| Australian Albums (ARIA) | 92 |
| Australian Urban Albums (ARIA) | 19 |
| Belgian Albums (Ultratop Flanders) | 18 |
| Belgian Albums (Ultratop Wallonia) | 59 |
| Canadian R&B Albums (Nielsen Soundscan) | 26 |
| Danish Albums (Hitlisten) | 23 |
| Dutch Albums (Album Top 100) | 6 |
| Finnish Albums (Suomen virallinen lista) | 15 |
| French Albums (SNEP) | 82 |
| German Albums (Offizielle Top 100) | 87 |
| Swedish Albums (Sverigetopplistan) | 12 |
| Swiss Albums (Schweizer Hitparade) | 60 |
| UK Albums (Official Charts) | 56 |
| UK R&B Albums (Official Charts) | 12 |
| US Billboard 200 | 14 |
| US Top R&B/Hip-Hop Albums (Billboard) | 4 |

=== Year-end charts ===
Year-end chart performance for Stone Love
| Chart (2004) | Position |
|---|---|
| Dutch Albums (Album Top 100) | 94 |
| US Top R&B/Hip-Hop Albums (Billboard) | 89 |

== Release history ==
Release history for Stone Love
| Region | Date | Label | Ref. |
|---|---|---|---|
| United Kingdom | June 28, 2004 | Arista | |
| France | July 5, 2004 | BMG | |
| Germany | July 5, 2004 | BMG | |
| United States | July 6, 2004 | J | |
| Australia | July 16, 2004 | BMG | |
| Japan | July 21, 2004 | BMG | |
