= I Wanna Thank Ya =

Single by Angie Stone featuring Snoop Dogg

from the album Stone Love
- Released: May 3, 2004
- Length: 3:47
- Label: J
- Songwriters: Phalon Alexander; Calvin Broadus; Eldra DeBarge; Joyce Sims; Angie Stone
- Producer: Jazze Pha

Angie Stone singles chronology
"Bottles & Cans" (2003)	"I Wanna Thank Ya" (2004)	"U-Haul" (2004)

Snoop Dogg singles chronology
"Red Light-Green Light" (2003)	"I Wanna Thank Ya" (2004)	"Drop It Like It's Hot" (2004)

"I Wanna Thank Ya" is a song by American singer Angie Stone. It was produced by Jazze Pha for her third studio album Stone Love (2004) and features guest vocals from rapper Snoop Dogg. An uptempo R&B and neo soul track with heavy funk and disco elements, it samples from Deodato's song "Skatin'" (1980), Joyce Sims's "Come into My Life" (1987), DeBarge's "All This Love" (1982), and the S.O.S. Band's "Take Your Time (Do It Right)" (1980). "I Wanna Thank Ya" was released as the album's lead single on May 3, 2004.

The song earned largely positive reviews from music critics, who called it a "breezy summertime jam." It became a top ten hit on the UK R&B chart, but was less successful in the United States where it peaked at number 22 on the Adult R&B Songs chart, though a remix of the song, produced by Hex Hector and Mac Quayle became Stone's second number-one hit on the Billboard Dance Club Songs chart. British actor Idris Elba co-starred in the music video for "I Wanna Thank Ya," which was directed by Jessy Terrero.

== Background ==
"I Wanna Thank Ya" was written by Angie Stone along with rapper Snoop Dogg, and its producer Jazze Pha. An uptempo R&B and neo soul track with heavy funk and disco elements, it contains re-sung lyrics from American singer Joyce Sims' song "Come Into My Life" (1987) as well as interpolations of R&B band DeBarge's 1982 song "All This Love." The song also features uncreditd samples from Brazilian musician's Eumir Deodato's song "Skatin'" (1980) and American electro-funk group The S.O.S. Band's "Take Your Time (Do It Right)" (1980). Jazze Pha commented on the creation process: "[Stone] and I wrote the record together, and Snoop came on later. It was fun working with Angie. We let each other do our own thing. I came up with some of the grooves, and we agreed and disagreed, but eventually, we came up with the best product." Pha later recycled the beat he produced for "I Wanna Thank Ya" on American rapper The Notorious B.I.G.'s 2005 posthumous single "Nasty Girl."

== Critical reception ==
Billboard critic Gail Mitchell found that the song's "bass-driven, handclap-accented arrangement is a perfect let's-swing-into-summer record. The midtempo jam owes its charm to Stone's lilting vocal, as well as its smart lyrical reference to Joyce Sims' late-'80s club hit “Come Into My Life" [...] The song's voice-over intro may be off-putting to some. Don't let that detract you from the rest of the song's good-time groove." Caroline Sullivan from The Guardian called "I Wanna Thank Ya" a "warmhearted appreciation song," which she found to be routed in "floaty old-school R&B." Gary Crossing from Yahoo! Music noted that the song features a "mellifluous bassline and sensual, breezy feel," while People magazine declared the song as a "breezy summertime jam." Vibe's Taisha Rucker called the song a "jazzy lead single [...] that's sure to appeal to the masses."

Rolling Stone's Jon Caramanica felt that "I Wanna Thank Ya" "sports an ostentatious Jazze Pha beat and a grown-and-sexy rap by Snoop Dogg. When Stone insists, "Your love is gangsta," it sounds a hell of a lot better than it reads; she gasps the line like a disco diva, spent in the best sense possible." AllMusic editor Rob Theakston wrote: "The useless guest appearance of the tired Snoop Dogg and his "izzle" façade does very little to improve the quality of the [song] – if anything, it detracts from the song's overall atmosphere with constant interruptions that do nothing but serve as reminders that the Dogg is not having one of his better days." Now's Sarah Liss noted that "Snoop's fo shizzling on "I Wanna Thank Ya" is tired." Joe Warminsky from The Washington Post found that Stone's decision to include the rapper was a "slip-up" and called the song a "Snoop-filled summertime fluff."

== Chart performance ==
Released by J Records on May 3, 2004 in the United States, "I Wanna Thank Ya" marked Stone's first lead single to miss the US Billboard Hot 100. It, however, reached number 61 on Billboard's Hot R&B/Hip-Hop Songs and number 22 on the Adult R&B Songs, becoming Stone Love's highest-charting single on the former chart. The song fared better on the US Dance Club Songs, where a remix of the song, produced by Hex Hector and Mac Quayle, emerged as Stone's second number-one hit on the chart. In the United Kingdom, "I Wanna Thank Ya" debuted and peaked at number 31 on the UK Singles Chart in the week of August 14, 2004. It became Stone's highest-charting single since "Wish I Didn't Miss You" (2001). The song also reached number five on the UK R&B chart.

== Music video ==
A music video for "I Wanna Thank Ya" was filmed by Dominican director Jessy Terrero. Apart from Snoop Dogg, British actor Idris Elba appears as Stone's love interest in the video.

== Track listing ==
CD, maxi-single
No.	Title	Writer(s)	Producer(s)	Length
1.	"I Wanna Thank Ya" (radio edit) (featuring Snoop Dogg)	Phalon Alexander; Calvin Broadus; Eldra DeBarge; Joyce Sims; Angie Stone	Jazze Pha	3:47
2.	"I Wanna Thank Ya" (radio edit) (w/o Snoop Dogg)	Alexander; DeBarge; Sims; Stone	Pha	3:15
3.	"I Wish I Didn't Miss You" (Hex Hector/Mac Quayle remix)	Andrea Martin; Ivan Matias; Leon Huff; Gene McFadden; John Whitehead	Matias; Martin; Stone^{[a]}; Swizz Beatz^{[a]}; Hex Hector^{[b]}; Mac Quayle^{[b]}	3:56
4.	"I Wanna Thank Ya" (music video)

Notes

- ^{^a} signifies a co-producer
- ^{^b} signifies an additional producer

== Credits and personnel ==
Credits lifted from the liner notes of Stone Love.

- Dave Aron – recording engineer
- Eldra DeBarge – writer (sample)
- Snoop Dogg – guest vocalist, writer
- Tim Donovan – recording engineer
- Serban Ghenea – mixing engineer
- John Hanes – additional Pro Tools engineer
- Yutaka Kawana – engineer assistance
- Jazze Pha – background vocalist, producer, writer
- Tim Roberts – additional Pro Tools engineering assistance
- Joyce Sims – writer (sample)
- Angie Stone – lead vocalist, writer
- Arnold Wolfe – recording engineer

== Charts ==
=== Weekly charts ===
Weekly chart performance for "I Wanna Thank Ya"
Chart (2004)	Peak position
Belgium (Ultratip Bubbling Under Flanders)	5
Netherlands (Single Top 100)	57
Scotland Singles (OCC)	68
UK Singles (OCC)	31
UK Hip Hop/R&B (OCC)	9
US Adult R&B Songs (Billboard)	22
US Dance Club Songs (Billboard)	1
US Hot R&B/Hip-Hop Songs (Billboard)	61

=== Year-end charts ===
Year-end chart performance for "I Wanna Thank Ya"
Chart (2004)	Position
UK Urban (Music Week)	13

== Release history ==
Release history for "I Wanna Thank Ya"
Region	Date	Format(s)	Label(s)	Ref.
United States	May 3, 2004	Urban contemporary radio; urban AC radio	J; RMG	
