= Stay for a While =

Single by Angie Stone featuring Anthony Hamilton

from the album Stone Love
- Released: October 11, 2004
- Length: 4:01
- Label: J
- Songwriters: Angie Stone; Jonathan Richmond; Juanita Wynn; Anthony Hamilton
- Producers: Angie Stone; Jonathan Richmond

Angie Stone singles chronology
"U-Haul" (2004)	"Stay for a While" (2004)	"I Wasn't Kidding" (2005)

"Stay for a While" is a song by American singer Angie Stone, featuring singer Anthony Hamilton. It was written by Stone, Hamilton, Juanita Wynn, and Jonathan Richmond for Stone's third studio album Stone Love (2004), while production was helmed by Stone and Richmond. Released by J Records as the album's third and final single on October 12, 2004, it reached number 21 on the US Billboard Adult R&B Songs and peaked at number 70 on the Hot R&B/Hip-Hop Songs chart.

== Critical reception ==
AllMusic editor Rob Theakston ranked "Stay for a While" among his favorite tracks on parent album Stone Love and called Hamilton's performance on the song "exceptional." Jennifer F. Bogar from Today declared the song a "phenomenal track drenched in [both singers'] gospel roots."

== Chart performance ==
"Stay for a While" debuted at number 72 on the US Hot R&B/Hip-Hop Songs chart in the week of December 18, 2004 and peaked at number 70 on January 15, 2005. The song also peaked at number 22 on Billboard's Adult R&B Songs, becoming Stone Love' third consecutive single to enter the chart.

== Track listing ==
Promo CD single
No.	Title	Length
1.	"Stay for a While" (radio edit) (featuring Anthony Hamilton)	3:55
2.	"Stay for a While" (instrumental)	4:06
3.	"Stay for a While" (call-out hook)	0:10

== Personnel ==
- Rob Barahona – recording assistance
- Anthony Hamilton – vocals, writer
- Yutaka Kawana – recording assistance
- Manny Marroquin – mixing engineer
- Angie Stone – producer, vocals, writer
- Jonathan Richmond – producer, writer
- Jon Rych – instruments
- Daniel "Boom" Wierup – recording engineer
- Eric Walls – guitar
- Juanita Wynn – writer

== Charts ==
Weekly chart performance for "Stay for a While"
Chart (2004)	Peak position
US Hot R&B/Hip-Hop Songs (Billboard)	70

== Release history ==
Release dates for "Stay for a While"
Region	Date	Format(s)	Label(s)	Ref.
United States	October 11, 2004	Urban contemporary radio	J; RMG	
