= All About Love (Joyce Sims album) =

1989 studio album by Joyce Sims

Studio album by Joyce Sims
- Released: 1989
- Labels: Sleeping Bag; FFRR
- Producers: Joyce Sims; Andy Panda; Justin Strauss; Greg D. Smith; Royal Bayyan; Little Louie Vega; Todd Terry; Jerry Gottus; Dana "FREE-D" Vleck

Joyce Sims chronology
| Come into My Life (1987) | All About Love (1989) | A New Beginning (2006) |

Professional ratings
Review scores
| Source | Rating |
|---|---|
| AllMusic | 3/5 stars |

All About Love is the second album by American singer-songwriter Joyce Sims, released in 1989. The album includes two singles: "Looking for a Love" (No. 51 on the US Hot R&B/Hip-Hop Songs chart, No. 39 in the UK Singles Chart) and the title track "All About Love" (No. 69 on Hot R&B/Hip-Hop Songs, No. 34 on Dance Club Songs chart).

== Track listing ==
All tracks written by Joyce Sims, except where noted.

| No. | Title | Writer(s) | Length |
|---|---|---|---|
| 1. | "Looking for a Love" | | 3:50 |
| 2. | "Take Caution with My Heart" | | 5:35 |
| 3. | "(You Make Me Feel Like a) Natural Woman" | Gerry Goffin; Carole King; Jerry Wexler | 3:30 |
| 4. | "Here We Go Again" | | 5:08 |
| 5. | "(I'm Back) I Love You More" | | 5:10 |
| 6. | "Don't Let This Feeling Die" | | 5:25 |
| 7. | "I Surrender" | | 6:13 |
| 8. | "Crazy Love" | | 4:55 |
| 9. | "You Mean the World to Me" | | 4:50 |
| 10. | "All About Love" | | 4:16 |

Note

- Some versions of the album feature the tracks in a different order.

== Personnel ==
Adapted from the album's liner notes.

- Joyce Sims – producer, arranger (all tracks)
- Andy Panda – co-producer (track 1), post production & additional mix (track 6)
- Justin Strauss – post production & additional mix (track 2), co-producer (track 7)
- Greg D. Smith – additional production (tracks 3, 8)
- Royal Bayyan – co-producer (track 4)
- Todd Terry & Little Louie Vega – post production & additional mix (track 5)
- Jerry Gottus – co-producer (track 9)
- Dana "FREE-D" Vleck – additional production (track 10)
- Chep Nunez & Mervyn Jordan – editing
- Howie Weinberg – mastering
- Zoli Design – art direction
- Janette Beckman – photography
- Wendy Schecter – stylist
- Jeffrey Woodley – hair
- Patrick Poussard – make-up

== Charts ==
| Chart (1989) | Peak position |
|---|---|
| UK Albums Chart | 64 |
| US Top R&B/Hip-Hop Albums | 65 |
