= U-Haul (song) =

Single by Angie Stone

from the album Stone Love
- Released: July 26, 2004
- Length: 3:56
- Label: J
- Songwriters: Missy Elliott; Nisan Stewart; Craig Brockman; John Smith
- Producer: Missy Elliott

Angie Stone singles chronology
| "I Wanna Thank Ya" (2004) | "U-Haul" (2004) | "Stay for a While" (2004) |

"U-Haul" is a song by American singer Angie Stone. It was written and produced by Missy Elliott, Nisan Stewart, Craig Brockman, and John "Jubu" Smith for Stone's third studio album Stone Love (2004). Apart from Elliott, singers Tweet and Betty Wright as well as Stone's daughter Diamond appear as backing vocalists on the song. Released as the album's second single, it reached number 19 on Billboard's Adult R&B Songs. "U-Haul" was nominated for a Grammy Award for Best Female R&B Vocal Performance at the 47th Grammy Awards but lost to label mate Alicia Keys' "If I Ain't Got You."

== Critical reception ==
Elle magazine called the "I-should-have-left-your-ass-years-ago ballad" Stone Love's "standout track." while Lynn Norment from Ebony described the song as "brassy." In his review of Stone Love Robert Hilburn, writing for The Los Angeles Times, wrote: "Stone shines on her own, especially with "U-Haul," a song co-written and co-produced by Missy Elliott that serves as a playful statement of survival."

== Chart performance ==
"U-Haul" was released by J Records as the second single from Stone Love on July 26, 2004 in the United States. It debuted and peaked at number 68 on the US Billboard Hot R&B/Hip-Hop Songs chart in the week of October 30, 2004. The song fared better on the US Adult R&B Songs chart, peaking at number 19. It became Stone Love's highest-charting single on the Adult R&B Songs chart.

== Track listing ==
Promo CD single
| No. | Title | Length |
|---|---|---|
| 1. | "U-Haul" (Radio Edit #1) | 3:55 |
| 2. | "U-Haul" (Radio Edit #2) | 3:35 |
| 3. | "U-Haul" (Instrumental) | 3:56 |
| 4. | "U-Haul" (Call Out Hooks) | 0:10 |

== Personnel ==
- Marcella Araica – recording assistance
- Carlos Bedoya – recording
- Craig Brockman – co-production, writing
- Tim Donovan – recording
- Missy Elliott – backing vocals, production, writing
- Paul Falcone – mixing
- John "Jubu" Smith – co-production, writing
- Nisan Stewart – co-production, writing
- Angie Stone – vocals, backing vocals
- Diamond Stone – backing vocals
- Tweet – backing vocals
- Betty Wright – backing vocals

== Charts ==
Weekly chart performance for "U-Haul"
| Chart (2004) | Peak position |
|---|---|
| US Hot R&B/Hip-Hop Songs (Billboard) | 68 |

== Release history ==
Release history for "U-Haul"
| Region | Date | Format(s) | Label(s) | Ref. |
|---|---|---|---|---|
| United States | July 26, 2004 | Urban AC radio | J; RMG | |
