= Come into My Life (Joyce Sims song) =

Single by Joyce Sims

from the album Come into My Life
- B-side: "All in All"
- Released: 1987
- Genre: Funk; R&B; electronic; soul
- Length: 3:35
- Label: Sleeping Bag Records
- Songwriter: Joyce Sims
- Producer: Kurtis Mantronik

Joyce Sims singles chronology
"Lifetime Love" (1987)	"Come into My Life" (1987)	"Walk Away" (1987)

Music video
- "Come into My Life" on YouTube

"Come into My Life" is a song by American singer-songwriter Joyce Sims, released in 1987 by Sleeping Bag Records as the second single from the singer's debut album, Come into My Life (1987). Written by Sims and produced by Jamaican-born hip hop and electronic-music artist, DJ, remixer and producer Kurtis Mantronik, it was her most successful song and a sizeable hit in Europe. It peaked at number seven on the UK Singles Chart and number ten on the US Billboard R&B singles chart. Elsewhere in Europe, the song became a top-10 hit also in Belgium, West Germany, the Netherlands and Switzerland. In both 1995 and 2004, "Come into My Life" was re-released with new remixes. German magazine Spex included the song in their "The Best Singles of the Century" list in 1999.

== Critical reception ==
Andy Kellman from AllMusic wrote retrospectively that "Come into My Life" is "easily the best surrogate, low-budget Loose Ends song recorded". The American magazine Billboard noted that the singer "weaves seductive passages that spin their magic" on the track. The reviewer added, "Sims grasps dance dynamics and club appeal better than most and consistently creates ear-fetching grooves." James Hamilton from Music Week's RM Dance Update described it as a "sweetly warbled early Eighties style soul swayer". NME wrote, "The real trance dance of the insidious 'Come into My Life' carries a beautiful tune."

== Track listing ==
- 7" single, US (1987)
1. "Come into My Life" (Radio Version) – 3:35
2. "Come into My Life" (Dub Version) – 5:08
- 12", Germany (1987)
1. "Come into My Life" (Club Version) – 8:19
2. "Come into My Life" (Dub Version) – 5:04
3. "Lifetime Love"/"All in All" (Megamix) – 5:08
- 12" maxi, US (1987)
1. "Come into My Life" (Club Version) – 8:20
2. "Come into My Life" (Radio Version) – 3:39
3. "Come into My Life" (Dub Version) – 5:08
4. "Come into My Life" (Bonus Beats) – 2:32
- 12" (Remixes), US (2004)
1. "Come into My Life" (Club Mix) – 7:25
2. "Come into My Life" (Deep Mix) – 7:17
3. "Come into My Life" (Supaflyas Mix) – 3:20
4. "Come into My Life" (Sanz Remix) – 6:56
- 12", US (1995)
1. "Come into My Life" (Radio Version) – 3:40
2. "Come into My Life" (Club Version) – 7:21
3. "Come into My Life" (Hip Hop Version) – 5:05
4. "Come into My Life" (Spanish Version) – 4:31
5. "All and All" (Radio Version) – 4:00
6. "All and All" (Extended R&B Version) – 6:31
- CD maxi, Europe (1995)
1. "Come into My Life" (Radio Version) – 3:50
2. "Come into My Life" (Super Club Mix) – 6:00
3. "Come into My Life" (US Club Mix) – 5:08
4. "Come into My Life" (Parkside Late Night Club Mix) – 7:50
5. "Come into My Life" (Spanish Version) – 4:30
6. "Come into My Life" (Piano Acapella) – 3:05

== Charts ==
=== Weekly charts ===
Chart (1987–88)	Peak position
Belgium (Ultratop 50 Flanders)	9
Ireland (IRMA)	18
Israel (Israeli Singles Chart)	20
Italy Airplay (Music & Media)	11
Netherlands (Dutch Top 40)	7
Netherlands (Single Top 100)	7
Switzerland (Schweizer Hitparade)	7
UK Singles (Official Charts)	7
US Hot R&B/Hip-Hop Songs (Billboard)	10
West Germany (GfK)	4

Chart (1995)	Peak position
UK Singles (OCC)	72
UK Dance (OCC)	23
UK Club Chart (Music Week)	14
UK Pop Tip Club Chart (Music Week)	31

=== Year-end charts ===
Chart (1988)	Position
Belgium (Ultratop)	99
Netherlands (Dutch Top 40)	64
Netherlands (Single Top 100)	54
West Germany (Media Control)	27

== In media ==
- The song was used in the HBO mini-series Show Me a Hero, and can be heard playing on the radio in a scene during the 1995 film Species.
- The track influenced the Indian song "Dheere Dheere" by Nadeem–Shravan.
