= Best, Best =

Promotional single by Missy Elliott
- Released: June 13, 2008
- Length: 4:41
- Label: Goldmind; Atlantic
- Songwriters: Missy Elliott; Nate Hills; Marcella Araica
- Producers: Danja; Missy Elliott

"Best, Best" is a song by American rapper Missy Elliott. It was written by Elliott, Marcella Araica, and Nate "Danja" Hills for what was supposed to be Elliott's seventh studio album Block Party, while production was helmed by Elliott and Hills. Announced as the album's lead single, it was released by The Goldmind Inc. and Atlantic Records on June 13, 2008, and peaked at number 94 on the US Hot R&B/Hip-Hop Songs. Since Block Party was abandoned in the spring of 2009, "Best, Best" remains a standalone promotional single.

== Composition ==
Written and produced by Elliott and music producer Danja, "Best, Best" is a futuristic sounding, mid-tempo Hip-hop and R&B song. Like some of Elliott's other songs it is rapped and sung. After Billboard previewed the song they stated, "Elliott, repeated the last word to every sentence throughout, rhymes, ('We fuss fuss / we fight fight / we make up up / by the night night.')".

== Critical reception ==
In his review of the Block Party's preview listening party in 2008, Rap-Up editor Rajul Punjabi wrote: "Danja didn't do much for this track, although Missy herself claims that it's "what "Irreplaceable" did for Beyoncé's album [...] Mid-tempo with a lyrical ode to her man. Missy repeats the last word of every line ("We fuss fuss / we fight fight / we make up by the end of the night night.)"" In a retrospective review of the song, Steven J. Horowitz from Vulture remarked that "Danja turns in a B-level take on Timbalands clattering percussion, accenting the rumble below with Casio-type synths. The beat offers little to support the stuttering Auto-Tuned lyrics that come across as simple for such a dexterous lyricist."

== Release ==
When choosing which song was going to be the lead single off of her seventh studio album, Elliott had plans to release "Act a Fool" as the lead single, but plans were quickly scrapped and "Best, Best" was chosen in its place. Released as a digital download on June 13, 2008, it peaked at number 94 on the US Hot R&B/Hip-Hop Songs. A planned music video for "Best, Best", announced in June 2008, never came to fruition.

== Charts ==
Chart performance for "Best, Best"
Chart (2008)	Peak position
US Hot R&B/Hip-Hop Songs (Billboard)	94

== Release history ==
Release history for "Best, Best"
Region	Date	Format(s)	Label	Ref(s)
Various	June 13, 2008	Digital download	Goldmind; Atlantic	
Various	July 29, 2008	12-inch single	Goldmind; Atlantic	
