= Charlene (Tweet album) =

Studio album by Tweet
- Released: February 26, 2016
- Studios: Log Cabin Studio (Tallahassee, Florida); Ready Mix Music (North Hollywood, California)
- Length: 53:42
- Label: eOne
- Producers: Charlie Bereal; Craig Brockman; Chris Brown; Charlene "Tweet" Keys (also exec.); Jairus Mozee; Jubu Smith; Nisan Stewart; Timbaland

Tweet chronology
Simply Tweet (2013)	Charlene (2016)

Singles from Charlene
- 1. "Won't Hurt Me" Released: September 21, 2015; 2. "Magic" Released: January 21, 2016; 3. "Neva Shouda Left Ya" Released: February 11, 2016; 4. "Somebody Else Will" Released: February 19, 2016

Charlene is the third studio album by American singer Tweet. It was released on February 26, 2016, by eOne Music. "Won't Hurt Me" was released on September 21, 2015, as the album's lead single. The album was preceded by additional singles "Magic" and "Neva Shouda Left Ya". Rolling Stone listed Charlene as the 12th best R&B album of 2016.

== Background ==
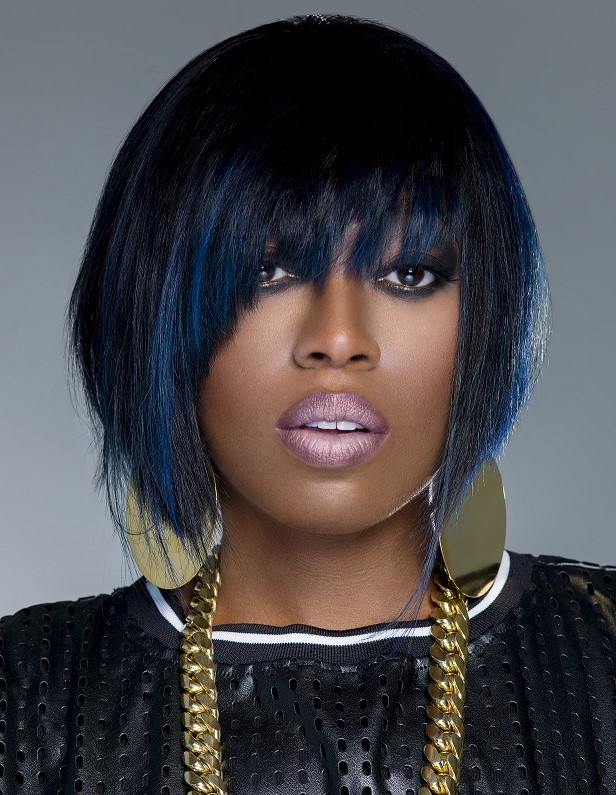
Tweet left Missy Elliott's record label in 2007 shortly after the release of It's Me Again. However, the pair reunited during the recording process of Charlene.

In 2007, Tweet departed from longtime friend Missy Elliott's The Goldmind Inc. label and signed to Jheryl Busby and Mike City's record label, Umbrella Recordings. There, she began recording material for her third album along with producers Nisan Stewart, Warryn Campbell and Novel. Tentatively titled Love, Tweet, the album was preceded by the buzz single "Good Bye My Dear", a collaboration with rapper T.I., and expected to be released on April 8, 2008. However, the release of lead single "Anymore" failed to materialize.

In 2010, Tweet parted ways with Umbrella due to lack of promotion and ongoing delays. In September 2011, Tweet signed to MC Lyte's record label DuBose Music Group. In June 2012, she began posting previously unreleased material from the It's Me Again and Love, Tweet recording sessions on her new website as a part of her weekly SoundCloud-hosted special, Tweet Tuesdays. She released an extended play titled Simply Tweet on February 26, 2013, through DuBose. The EP reached the top 30 on both the US Billboard Independent Albums and the Top R&B/Hip-Hop Albums charts.

After heaps of label troubles when Love, Tweet was shelved, in July 2015, Tweet confirmed that she had signed with the independent eOne Music label and confirmed that a new album was to be completed and released. Initially slated to feature vast production credits from Elliott and expected to be released on January 22, 2016, Charlene was pushed back to February 26, 2016, with further retooling and added contributions from other producers such as longtime collaborators Craig Brockman, Charlie Bereal, Nisan Stewart, and Timbaland.

== Critical reception ==
Professional ratings
Aggregate scores
Source	Rating
Metacritic	74/100
Review scores
Source	Rating
AllMusic	3.5/5 stars
HipHopDX	3.3/5
Now	4/5 Ns

Charlene was met with generally favorable reviews from music critic. On review aggregator Metacritic, the album received a score of 74 out of 100 based on four reviews. AllMusic editor Andy Kellman called the album "a relaxed, dimly lit collection, much of which could be replicated in an intimate setting with a simple instrumental setup." He noted that "Tweet has lost nothing vocally while gaining a decade's worth of wisdom. As ever, she exudes euphoria, longing, and irritation with the slightest of adjustments, and remains one of the best soft-voiced, low-volume singers around." Now critic Kevin Ritchie found that "as on her other best material, Charlene contains some of the most beautiful vocal arrangements in contemporary R&B. "Addicted", "Magic", "Priceless" and "Fool No Mo" are as sharply written and realized as they are unapologetically indulgent of heady atmospherics, each song its own exaltation of the understated power of Tweet's singular voice."

Mosi Reeves, writing for Spin, felt that "one of the pleasures of Charlene is how we can now enjoy Tweet – years removed from the burden of carrying Aaliyah's legacy – as a startlingly unique voice in her own right, a fact that we sometimes forgot during her brief reign on Top 40." Scott Glaysher from HipHopDX found that "the project doesn't sound much different from her 2013 EP or her 2005 LP [...] Tweet should by no means start teaming up with the likes of DJ Mustard [...] but the album should have come with more excitement. "Somebody Else Will" with Missy Elliott has a minor hip hop edge but other than that, not much pushes the proverbial envelope."

== Chart performance ==
Charlene debuted and peaked at number 42 on the US Billboard 200 in the week of March 29, 2016. It also reached number six on the Top R&B/Hip-Hop Albums chart, becoming Tweet's third consecutive album to enter the top ten, while also reaching number four on the Independent Albums chart.

== Track listing ==
Charlene track listing
No.	Title	Writer(s)	Producer(s)	Length
1.	"Intro: Soulfully Yours, Charlene"	Charlene "Tweet" Keys; John "Jubu" Smith	Keys; Smith	0:55
2.	"Magic"	Keys; Charlie Bereal	Bereal	3:37
3.	"Won't Hurt Me"	Keys; Smith	Smith; Bereal; Craig Brockman	3:25
4.	"Priceless"	Keys; Bereal; Brockman	Keys; Bereal; Brockman	5:31
5.	"Interlude: All I See Is You"	Keys; Bereal; Brockman	Keys; Bereal; Brockman	1:43
6.	"Somebody Else Will" (featuring Missy Elliott)	Melissa Elliott; Keys; Tim Mosley; Bereal; Giedrius Kuprevičius	Timbaland	4:20
7.	"Addicted"	Keys; Bereal	Keys; Bereal	4:15
8.	"Neva Shouda Left Ya"	Keys; Smith; Brockman; Nisan Stewart	Smith; Brockman; Stewart; Bereal	4:03
9.	"The Hardest Thing"	Keys; Smith	Smith; Bereal; Brockman; Stewart	4:48
10.	"Got Whatcha Want"	Keys; Smith	Smith; Bereal; Brockman; Stewart	4:38
11.	"Interlude: Will You Be Here"	Keys; Bereal; Chris Brown	Bereal; Brown	1:18
12.	"I Didn't Know"	Keys; Bereal; Brockman; Jairus Mozee	Bereal; Brockman; Mozee	3:06
13.	"Dadada.....Struggle"	Keys; Bereal; Brockman	Keys; Bereal; Brockman	5:35
14.	"I Was Created for This"	Keys; Charmelle Cofield; Bereal	Bereal	3:46
15.	"Outro: I Surrender"	Keys; Bereal; Brockman; Mozee	Keys; Bereal; Brockman; Mozee	2:42
Total length:				53:42

Best Buy exclusive edition bonus tracks
No.	Title	Writer(s)	Producer(s)	Length
16.	"Somewhere Out There"	Keys; Smith; Bereal; Brockman; Stewart	Smith; Bereal; Brockman; Stewart	4:14
17.	"Fool No Mo"	Keys; Bereal; Brockman	Keys; Bereal; Brockman	5:29

Sample credits

- "Somebody Else Will" contains a sample from "Be Pavadinimo (Untitled)" written and performed by Giedrius Kuprevičius.

== Personnel ==
Credits adapted from the liner notes of Charlene.

- Charlene "Tweet" Keys – vocals (all tracks); production (tracks 1, 4, 5, 7, 13, 15); guitar (tracks 4, 13); executive production
- Charlie Bereal – production (tracks 2–5, 7–15); guitar (tracks 2, 4, 5, 7, 8, 11–15); bass (tracks 2, 7, 9, 10, 13, 14); keyboards (tracks 2, 14); drums (tracks 3, 7, 11, 13)
- Craig Brockman – keyboards (tracks 2–5, 8); production (tracks 3–5, 8–10, 12, 13, 15); bass (track 4)
- Chris Brown – bass, production (track 11)
- Missy Elliott – vocals (track 6)
- Marc Ellus – mixing (tracks 1–5, 7–15)
- Chris Godbey – mixing (track 6)
- Paul Grosso – creative direction
- Paul Horabin – recording, vocal editing, vocal recording (all tracks); additional bass recording, drum recording, guitar recording (track 13)
- Andrew Kelley – art direction, design
- Kris Kolp – recording
- EJ Martin – percussion (tracks 2–4, 8–10, 12–14)
- Eric Morgeson – mastering
- Jairus Mozee – bass, production (tracks 12, 15)
- Dion Nuble – percussion (track 8)
- Qmillion – mixing (tracks 1–5, 7–15)
- Tyren Redd – photography
- Jubu Smith – guitar, production (tracks 1, 3, 8–10); bass (tracks 3, 8)
- Nisan Stewart – drums (tracks 3, 8–10); production (tracks 8–10)
- Chelsea Stratton – liner notes
- Scott Swanson – recording
- Phil "Phillionaire" Thornton – executive production
- Timbaland – instruments, production (track 6)

== Charts ==
=== Weekly charts ===
Weekly chart performance for Charlene
Chart (2016)	Peak position
US Billboard 200	42
US Independent Albums (Billboard)	4
US Top R&B/Hip-Hop Albums (Billboard)	6

=== Year-end charts ===
Year-end chart performance for Charlene
Chart (2016)	Position
US Top R&B/Hip-Hop Albums (Billboard)	96
