= Triple Threat (Missy Elliott song) =

Promotional single by Missy Elliott featuring Timbaland
- Released: September 18, 2012
- Length: 3:42
- Label: Goldmind; Atlantic
- Songwriter: Melissa Elliott
- Producers: J-Roc; Timbaland

"Triple Threat" is a song by American rapper Missy Elliott featuring a guest appearance by childhood friend and longtime collaborator Timbaland. Originally, a snippet of the song premiered in March 2012 during Timbaland's appearance on SXSW. This song, along with the accompanying "9th Inning," were both released as promotional singles on September 18, 2012.

== Critical reception ==
In a retrospective review of the song, Steven J. Horowitz from Vulture wrote: "Sweeping strings introduce "Triple Threat," the other A-side to 2012's "9th Inning." Elliott isn't heard until a minute into the track, and aside from her palpable verses, Timbaland holds court for the majority, circling the hook, “Missy and I going up, triple leader in our cup"."

== Charts ==
Chart performance for "Triple Threat"
Chart (2012)	Peak position
US Billboard Hot R&B/Hip-Hop Digital Songs	34
