= Joyce Sims =

American singer and songwriter (1959–2022)

- Born: Joyce Elizabeth Sims; August 6, 1959; Rochester, New York, U.S.
- Origin: Rochester, New York, U.S.
- Died: October 13, 2022 (aged 63) New Brunswick, New Jersey, U.S.
- Genres: R&B; dance; house; soul
- Occupations: Singer, songwriter
- Instruments: Voice; piano; drum machine
- Years active: 1986–2022
- Labels: Sleeping Bag Records; London/PolyGram records; Warlock Records; Vessel Entertainment
- Website: www.joycesimsonline.com

Joyce Elizabeth Sims-Sandiford (August 6, 1959 – October 13, 2022) was an American singer and songwriter, whose biggest hit single, "Come into My Life", reached the top 10 in both the US Billboard R&B Chart and the UK Singles Chart in 1987.

== Early life and education ==
Sims was born in Rochester, New York, on August 6, 1959. She formally studied music in college, learning a number of instruments. Sims was of the Baptist faith.

== Career ==
In 1986, Sims signed with the now-defunct record label Sleeping Bag Records. Her first hit single was "(You Are My) All and All" in 1986, which was produced by Kurtis Mantronik and reached No. 16 on the UK Singles Chart. It entered the US Dance Chart at #51; peaking at No. 6.

Sims followed up in 1988 with "Come into My Life" also produced by Kurtis Mantronik which peaked at No. 10 on the US Billboard R&B Chart and No. 7 on the UK Singles Chart. This became her biggest success, although it was her only top-10 single on the R&B chart. Both "All and All" and her remake of "Love Makes a Woman" with Jimmy Castor were also chart entries. Sims' debut album, Come into My Life, reached No. 22 in the US R&B album chart and No. 5 in the UK Albums Chart following the Top 10 success of the title track in the UK Singles Chart. All songs on the album were written by Sims except for "Love Makes a Woman". Sims' second album, All About Love, was released in 1989 and reached No. 64 in the UK Albums Chart.

In 1994, Sims released the single "Who's Crying Now" on Warlock Records, which absorbed her Sleeping Bag Records contract after purchasing the label in 1992.

In 2006, she released the single "What the World Needs Now is Love," from her album A New Beginning, after teaming up with record producers Junior Vasquez and Glen Frisica.

In 2009, Come into My Life: the Very Best of Joyce Sims, a double-CD of her greatest hits and remixes was released, which includes the original studio versions on the first disc and extended mixes on the second disc. That same year, she formed a record label, August Rose Records, and started work on a new album.

In 2014, Sims released the album Love Song, which includes a duet with reggae vocalist Maxi Priest.

Sims' music can be heard on the soundtrack of the film Species, and her songs have been recorded or sampled by Randy Crawford, Angie Stone, and Snoop Dogg. Sims released "Wishing You Were Here" on her own record label, August Rose Records, and another album, Back in Love Again.

== Death ==
Sims died unexpectedly in North Brunswick, New Jersey, on October 13, 2022, at the age of 63.

== Discography ==
=== Albums ===
Year	Album	Peak chart positions		Certifications
Year	Album	US R&B	UK	Certifications
1987	Come into My Life	22	5	BPI: Gold
1989	All About Love	65	64	
2006	A New Beginning	—	—	
2008	Come into My Life: Her Greatest Hits	—	—	
2009	Come into My Life: The Very Best of Joyce Sims	—	—	
2014	Love Song	—	—	
"—" denotes releases that did not chart or were not released in that territory.

=== Singles ===
Year	Title	Peak chart positions		
Year	Title	US R&B	US Dance	UK
1986	"All and All"	69	6	16
1987	"Lifetime Love"	23	10	34
1987	"Come into My Life"	10	48	7
1987	"Walk Away"	56	11	24
1988	"Love Makes a Woman"	29	―	85
1989	"Looking for a Love"	51	―	39
1989	"Take Caution with My Heart"	―	―	92
1990	"All About Love"	69	34	―
1994	"Come into My Life (remix)"	―	―	72
1994	"Who's Crying Now?"	―	―	―
2004	"Praise His Name"	―	―	―
2006	"What the World Needs Now"	―	14	―
2012	"Running Back to You"	―	―	―
2012	"Saving All My Love"	―	―	―
"—" denotes releases that did not chart or were not released.
