= 9th Inning =

Promotional single by Missy Elliott featuring Timbaland
- Released: September 18, 2012
- Length: 3:36
- Label: Goldmind; Atlantic
- Songwriter: Melissa Elliott
- Producers: J-Roc; Timbaland

"9th Inning" is a song by American rapper Missy Elliott featuring a guest appearance by childhood friend and longtime collaborator Timbaland. Originally, a snippet was released on Elliott's official website on September 10, 2012. This song, along with the accompanying "Triple Threat", made its full debut via Ustream on September 17, 2012, and were both released as promotional singles on September 18, 2012.

== Background ==
After many delays stretching from as far back as 2008 and after many choices for the lead single from Elliott's upcoming album Block Party, the songs "9th Inning" and "Triple Threat" were finally chosen and both released on September 18, 2012.

== Composition ==
"9th Inning" is a hip hop song that features vocals from both Elliott and Timbaland, with Elliott being the main vocalist and Timbaland being the guest vocalist. Its lyrics talk about the two performers preparing for their return to the music scene with brand new material and comparing their return as being in the ninth inning of a baseball game.

== Critical reception ==
In a retrospective review of the song, Steven J. Horowitz from Vulture found that it "lacked oomph, as well as the innovation of her more thought-out efforts."

== Charts ==
Chart performance for "9th Inning"
Chart (2012)	Peak position
US Billboard Hot R&B/Hip-Hop Digital Songs	43
