= Missy Elliott =

American rapper (born 1971)

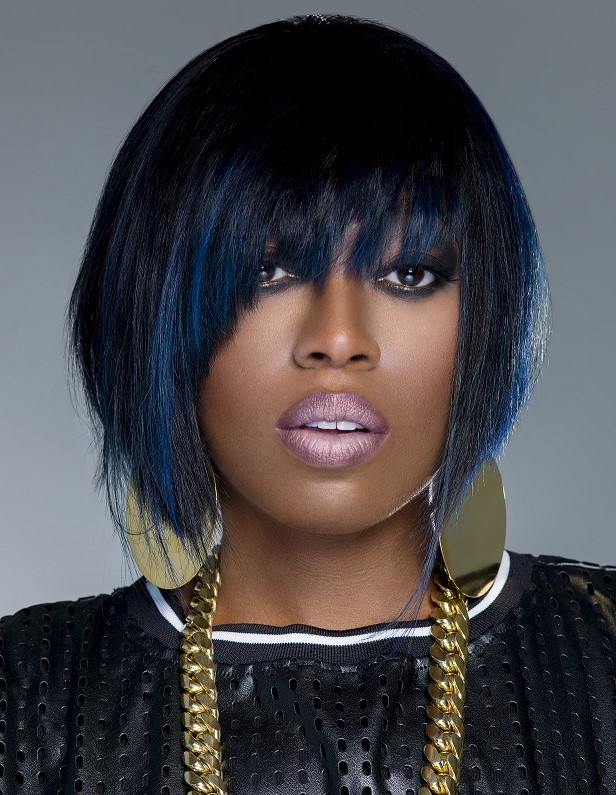
- Elliott in 2015

Background information
- Also known as: Misdemeanor; Miss E
- Born: Melissa Arnette Elliott; July 1, 1971 (age 55); Portsmouth, Virginia, U.S.
- Genres: Hip-hop; R&B; progressive rap; neo soul
- Occupations: Rapper; singer; songwriter; record producer; music executive
- Works: Recording; production
- Years active: 1988–present
- Labels: The Goldmind Inc.; East West; Elektra; Atlantic
- Formerly of: Swing Mob; Sista
- Website: missy-elliott.com

Signature
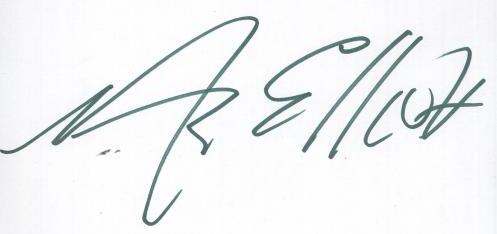

Melissa Arnette "Missy" Elliott (born July 1, 1971), also known as Misdemeanor, is an American rapper, singer, songwriter, and record producer. She began her musical career as a member of the R&B girl group Sista during the 1990s, who were part of the larger musical collective Swing Mob, led by DeVante Swing of Jodeci. Sista signed with Elektra Records to release their debut album, 4 All the Sistas Around da World (1994), which was critically praised but commercially unsuccessful. She collaborated with the album's producer and Swing Mob cohort Timbaland to work in songwriting and production for other acts, yielding commercially successful releases for 702, Aaliyah, SWV, and Total.

Elliott re-emerged as a solo act with several collaborative efforts and guest appearances by 1996. The following year, she released her debut solo album, Supa Dupa Fly, which peaked at number three on the US Billboard 200 and topped Billboard's Top R&B/Hip-Hop Albums chart. It spawned the Billboard Hot 100-top 20 single "Sock It 2 Me" (featuring Da Brat). Her second album, Da Real World (1999), produced the singles "She's a Bitch", "All n My Grill" (featuring Big Boi and Nicole Wray), and "Hot Boyz" (remixed featuring Lil' Mo, Nas, Eve and Q-Tip). The latter song set a 19-year record for most weeks atop the Hot R&B/Hip Hop Songs and spent 18 weeks atop the Hot Rap Songs chart.

Elliott's third and fourth albums, Miss E... So Addictive (2001) and Under Construction (2002) made her the sole recipient of both Grammy Awards for Best Female Rap Solo Performance with their respective songs "Scream a.k.a. Itchin" (featuring Timbaland) and "Work It". Furthermore, the albums peaked at numbers two and three on the Billboard 200, respectively, while "Work It" peaked at number two on the Billboard Hot 100. Her fifth and sixth albums, This Is Not a Test! (2003) and The Cookbook (2005), followed thereafter; the latter matched Under Construction on the Billboard 200 and spawned the Billboard Hot 100-top three single, "Lose Control" (featuring Ciara and Fatman Scoop). Following a long-term hiatus, her debut extended play, Iconology (2019) marked her first release in 14 years.

Elliott has received numerous accolades, including four Grammy Awards. Her overall discography has sold 40 million records worldwide, making her the best-selling female rapper in Nielsen Music history according to Billboard. She was the first female rapper to be inducted into the Songwriters Hall of Fame and to receive the MTV VMA's Michael Jackson Video Vanguard Award, for her impact on the music video landscape. In 2020, Billboard ranked her at No. 5 on their list of the 100 greatest music video artists of all time. In 2021, she was honored with a star on the Hollywood Walk of Fame. In 2023, she became the first female rapper to be nominated and inducted into the Rock and Roll Hall of Fame. In 2024, Elliott was honored as the 2022 recipient of the National Medal of Arts.

== Early life ==
Melissa Arnette Elliott was born on July 1, 1971, at Naval Medical Center Portsmouth in Portsmouth, Virginia, the only child of power company dispatcher Patricia and former Marine Ronnie Elliott. She grew up in an active church choir family, where singing was a normal part of her youth. At the age of four, she wanted to be a performer, with biographer Veronica A. Davis later writing that she "would sing and perform for her family". In later years, she feared no one would take her seriously because she was always the class clown. While her father was an active Marine, the family lived in a manufactured home community in Jacksonville, North Carolina. She blossomed during this part of her life, enjoying school for the friendships that she formed even though she had little interest in schoolwork. When her father returned from the Marines, the family moved back to Virginia, where they lived in extreme poverty.

Life in Virginia saw many hardships, and Elliott has talked about seeing her mother suffer domestic abuse at the hands of her father; she refused to attend sleepovers at her friends' homes out of fear that she would find her mother dead upon returning home. When she was eight, she was sexually abused by a cousin. In one violent incident, her father dislocated her mother's shoulders; during another, Elliott herself was threatened by her father with a gun. When Elliott was 14, her mother decided to end the situation and fled with Elliott on the pretext of taking a joyride on a local bus. In reality, the pair had found refuge at a family member's home, where their possessions were stored in a loaded U-Haul truck. Elliott told her mother that she feared her father would kill them both for leaving. She later stated, "When we left, my mother realized how strong she was on her own, and it made me strong. It took her leaving her home to be able to realize that." She and her mother lived in the Hodges Ferry neighborhood of Portsmouth, where Elliott graduated from Manor High School in 1990. She later said that she occasionally speaks to her father, but has not forgiven him for abusing her mother.

== Career ==
=== 1988–1995: Early work and Sista ===
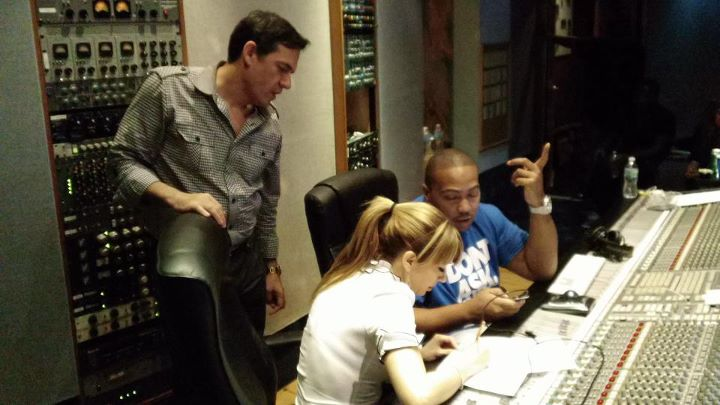
Elliott's childhood friend Timbaland (pictured in 2012, far right) helped define her sound and the two have continued working together for decades

In 1988, Elliott formed an all-women R&B group called Fayze (later renamed Sista) with friends La'Shawn Shellman, Chonita Coleman, and Radiah Scott. She was introduced to her neighborhood friend Timothy Mosley (Timbaland) by Melvin Barcliff (Magoo) who was trying to recruit Timbaland to be the group's producer and began making demo tracks, among them included the 1991 promo "First Move". Later in 1991, Fayze caught the attention of Jodeci member and producer DeVante Swing by performing Jodeci songs a cappella for him backstage after one of his group's concerts. In short order, Fayze moved to New York City and signed to Elektra Records through DeVante's Swing Mob imprint and also renaming the group Sista. Sista's debut song was titled "Brand New", which was released in 1993. Elliott took Mosley & Barclif whom DeVante re-christened the duo as Timbaland & Magoo.

All 20-plus members of the Swing Mob—among them future stars such as Ginuwine, Playa, and Tweet—lived in a single two-story house in New York and were often at work on material both for Jodeci and their own projects. While Elliott wrote and rapped on Raven-Symoné's 1993 debut single, "That's What Little Girls Are Made Of" which was her first big musical breakthrough, peaking at number 68 on the Billboard Hot 100 chart, she also contributed, credited and uncredited, to the Jodeci albums Diary of a Mad Band (1993) and The Show, the After Party, the Hotel (1995). Timbaland and DeVante jointly produced a Sista album, entitled 4 All the Sistas Around da World (1994). Though videos were released for the original and remix versions of the single "Brand New", the album was shelved and never released. One of the group's tracks, "It's Alright" featuring Craig Mack did however make the cut on the soundtrack of the 1995 motion picture Dangerous Minds but by the end of 1995, Swing Mob had folded and many of its members dispersed. Elliott, Timbaland, Magoo, Ginuwine, and Playa remained together and collaborated on each other's records for the rest of the decade as the musical collective The Superfriends.

=== 1996–1998: Supa Dupa Fly ===
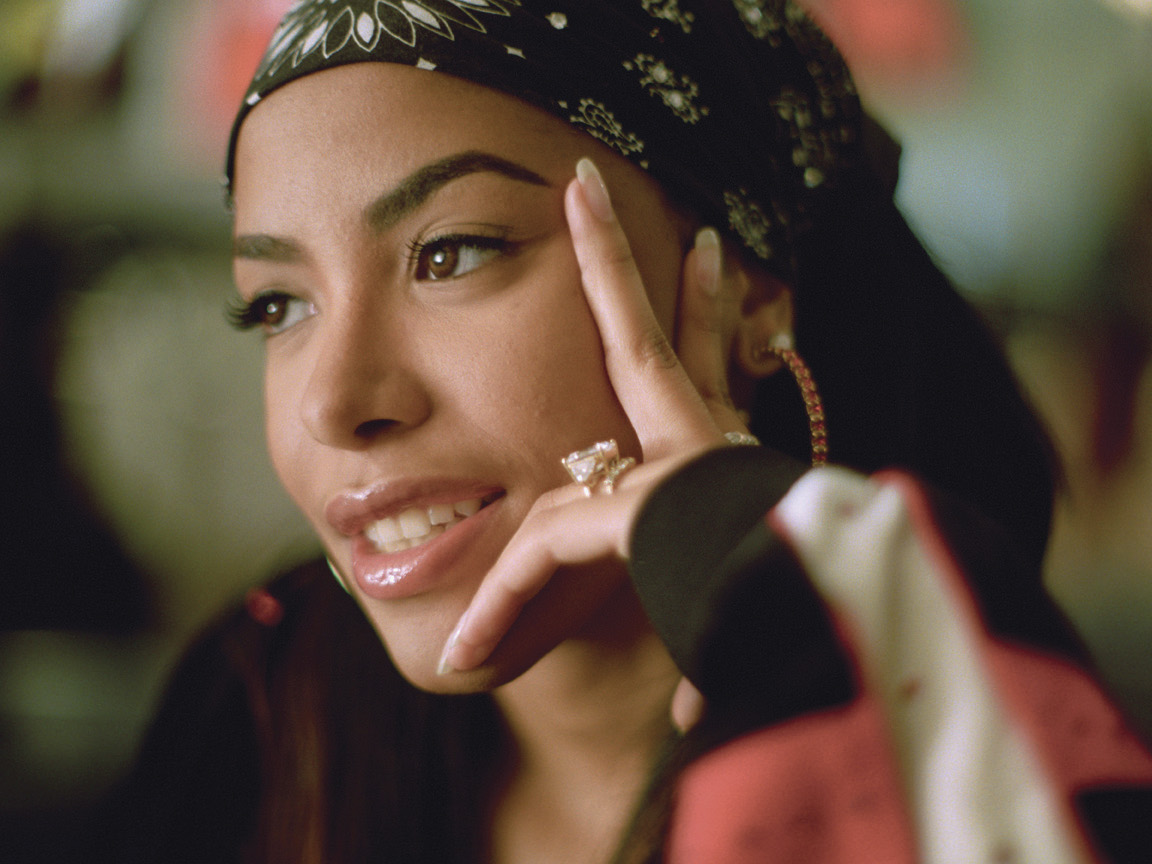
Elliott began collaborating with other artists in the late 1990s, including Aaliyah (pictured in 2000).

After leaving Swing Mob, Elliott and Timbaland worked together as a songwriting/production team, crafting tracks for acts including SWV, 702, and most notably Aaliyah. The pair wrote and produced nine tracks for Aaliyah's second album, One in a Million (1996), among them the hit singles "If Your Girl Only Knew", "One in a Million", "Hot Like Fire", and "4 Page Letter". Elliott contributed background vocals and/or guest raps to nearly all of the tracks on which she and Timbaland worked. One in a Million went double platinum and made stars out of the production duo. Elliott and Timbaland continued to work together for other artists, later creating hits for artists such as Total ("What About Us?"; 1997), Nicole Wray ("Make It Hot"; 1998), and Destiny's Child ("Get on the Bus"; 1998), as well as one final hit for Aaliyah, "I Care 4 U", before her death in 2001. Elliott also wrote the bulk of Total's second and final album Kima, Keisha, and Pam and Nicole Wray's debut Make It Hot (both released in 1998). Elliott began her career as a featured vocalist rapping on Sean "Puffy" Combs's Bad Boy remixes to Gina Thompson's "The Things That You Do", (which had a video featuring cameo appearances by Notorious B.I.G and Puff Daddy), MC Lyte's 1996 hit single "Cold Rock a Party" (backup vocals by Gina Thompson), and New Edition's 1996 single "You Don't Have to Worry". In 1996, Elliott also appeared on the Men of Vizion's remix of "Do Thangz" which was produced by Rodney Jerkins (coincidentally the producer of the original version of "The Things That You Do").

Combs had hoped to sign Elliott to his Bad Boy record label. Instead, she signed a deal in 1996 to create her own imprint, The Goldmind Inc., with East West Records, which at that time was a division of Elektra Entertainment Group, for which she would record as a solo artist. Timbaland was again recruited as her production partner, a role he would hold on most of Elliott's solo releases. Missy continued to work with other artists and appeared on LSG's song "All the Time" with Gerald Levert, Keith Sweat, Johnny Gill, Faith Evans, and Coko in 1997 on Levert Sweat Gill classic album. The same year, she rapped in "Keys To My House" with old friends group LeVert. In the center of a busy period of making guest appearances and writing for other artists, Elliott's debut album, Supa Dupa Fly, was released in mid-1997; the success of its lead single "The Rain" led the album to be certified platinum. Elliott wore an oversized trash-bag looking jumpsuit in the music video, and at Lilith Fair, an outfit media articles have considered one of her most recognizable "fashion moments".

The success was also a result of the music videos of her single releases, which were directed by Harold "Hype" Williams, who created many groundbreaking hip-hop, Afro-futuristic videos at the time. The album was nominated for Best Rap Album at the 1998 Grammy Awards, but lost to Puff Daddy's No Way Out. The year also saw Elliott perform live at the MTV Video Music Awards show on a remix to Lil' Kim's "Ladies Night" with fellow rappers Da Brat, Angie Martinez and TLC-rapper Left Eye. Elliott continued her successful career in the background as a producer and writer on Total's single "Trippin'", as well as working with several others in the hip-hop and R&B communities. Elliott co-wrote and co-produced two tracks on Whitney Houston's 1998 album My Love Is Your Love, providing vocal cameos for "In My Business" and "Oh Yes". Elliott also produced and made a guest appearance on Spice Girl Melanie Brown's debut solo single, "I Want You Back", which topped the UK Singles Chart in Brown's native United Kingdom and is Elliott's only chart-topping song in that country.

=== 1999–2001: Da Real World and Miss E... So Addictive ===
Although a much darker album than her debut, Elliott's second album was just as successful as the first, selling 1.5 million copies and 3 million copies worldwide. She remarked, "I can't even explain the pressure. The last album took me a week to record. This one took almost two months...I couldn't rush it the second time because people expect more." Da Real World (1999) included the singles "All n My Grill", a collaboration with Nicole Wray and Big Boi (from OutKast), a remix to "Hot Boyz" and "She's a Bitch". Also in 1999, Elliott was featured, alongside Da Brat, on the official remix to a Mariah Carey single "Heartbreaker". A music video was filmed for the remix, shot in black and white and featuring a cameo appearance by Dogg. The Desert Storm Remix is acclaimed by music critics and became a cult remix.

Missy Elliott next released Miss E... So Addictive on May 15, 2001. The album debuted at number two in the United States and sold 250,000 copies in its first week. It spawned the massive pop and urban hits "One Minute Man" (as to which MTV wrote: "Missy Elliott Plays Dr. Ruth On New Single"), featuring Ludacris and Trina, and "Get Ur Freak On", as well as the international club hit "4 My People" and the less commercially successful single "Take Away". The double music video for "Take Away/4 My People" was released in the fall of 2001, shortly after the sudden death of Elliott's close friend Aaliyah on August 25 and the 9/11 terrorist attacks. The "Take Away" video contained images of and words about Aaliyah, and the slow ballad acted as a tribute to her memory. The remainder of the video was the more upbeat "4 My People", contained scenes of people dancing happily in front of American flags and Elliott dressed in red, white and blue. Though "Take Away" was not a success on radio, "4 My People" went on to become an American and European club hit due to a popular remix by house music duo Basement Jaxx in 2002.

Tweet's appearance on Elliott's "Take Away" as well as her cameo at Elliott's house on MTV Cribs helped to create a buzz about the new R&B singer. Tweet's own debut single, "Oops (Oh My)", was co-written by Elliott and released through Goldmind in February 2002. The single was a top ten hit, thanks partially to Elliott's songwriting and guest rap, and to Timbaland's unusual production on the track. Elliott co-produced the Christina Aguilera, Lil' Kim, Mýa and Pink cover of "Lady Marmalade" for the album Moulin Rouge! Music from Baz Luhrmann's Film, which went to number one on the Billboard Hot 100 in 2001.

=== 2002–2004: Under Construction and This Is Not a Test! ===
For her next outing, Elliott and Timbaland focused on an old school sound, utilizing many old school rap and funk samples, such as Run–DMC's "Peter Piper" and Frankie Smith's "Double Dutch Bus". Elliott's fourth album, 2002's Under Construction sold 2.1 million copies in the United States. In 2002, Elliott won a Grammy Award for Best Rap Solo Performance for "Get Ur Freak On". In 2003, Under Construction received Grammy nominations for Best Rap Album and Album of the Year. The New York Times designated Under Construction "this year's best hip-hop album". Elliott released two singles off of Under Construction. The lead single, "Work It" reached No. 2 on Billboard's Hot 100 chart and won the "Video of the Year" award at MTV's Video Music Awards. The second single, "Gossip Folks" featuring Ludacris, became a Top 10 hit on Billboard's Hot 100 chart, was one of the most-played music videos on MTV, MTV2, MTV Jams, and BET in 2003 and was embraced by the dance community, as well as the mainstream, due to a Fatboy Slim remix. A third single was never released, though a video was shot for "Back In The Day" featuring Jay-Z and Elliott.

In between albums, Elliott produced the "American Dream Remix" (featuring Tweet's additional vocals) of Madonna's single "American Life", was featured rapper on Timbaland & Magoo's return single, "Cop That Shit", and produced "Fighting Temptation" (featuring herself, Beyoncé, Free and MC Lyte) for the soundtrack to the Cuba Gooding Jr. and Beyoncé Knowles movie of the same name. The track reached No. 1 in Japan but failed to chart in the U.S. Hot 100. Elliott was also featured on Wyclef Jean's "Party to Damascus" and Ghostface Killah's "Tush" singles, the latter of which became a minor 2004 dance hit, and had a pivotal role in the film Honey. Gap approached Elliott later in the year to co-star in a commercial with Madonna, which received much media attention. Elliott furthered her relationship with Madonna by performing the controversial 2003 MTV Video Music Awards show opening alongside Madonna, Britney Spears and Christina Aguilera. Also in September 2003, Elliott performed the theme song "The Opposite Sex" for the UPN sitcom Eve starring her good friend and fellow rapper Eve. It lasted for three seasons.

A year after Elliott's most successful album to date was released, Elliott felt pressured by her label to release another album hoping to capitalize on her recent success. Elliott's singles, "Pass That Dutch" and "I'm Really Hot", from her fifth album, This Is Not a Test! (released November 2003), both rose the urban charts. However, both were not as successful at pop radio in comparison to many of her previous efforts. This Is Not A Test sold 690,000 copies in the United States and has been certified Platinum by the Recording Industry Association of America (RIAA). Elliott has since stated that "the album This Is Not A Test came out extremely too quickly for me. I didn't want it to come out when it did." In 2004, Elliott was featured on Ciara's hit single "1, 2 Step", with her verse interpolating Teena Marie's single, "Square Biz". Elliott premiered her own reality show on the UPN Network, The Road to Stardom with Missy Elliott in 2005 even though it was not renewed for a second season. During the late 1990s and early 2000s, she sold more than 7.6 million copies in the United States, being the woman rapper with best-selling albums in the country, followed by Lauryn Hill (seven million), Lil' Kim (four million), and Eve (four million) at the time.

=== 2005–2006: The Cookbook ===
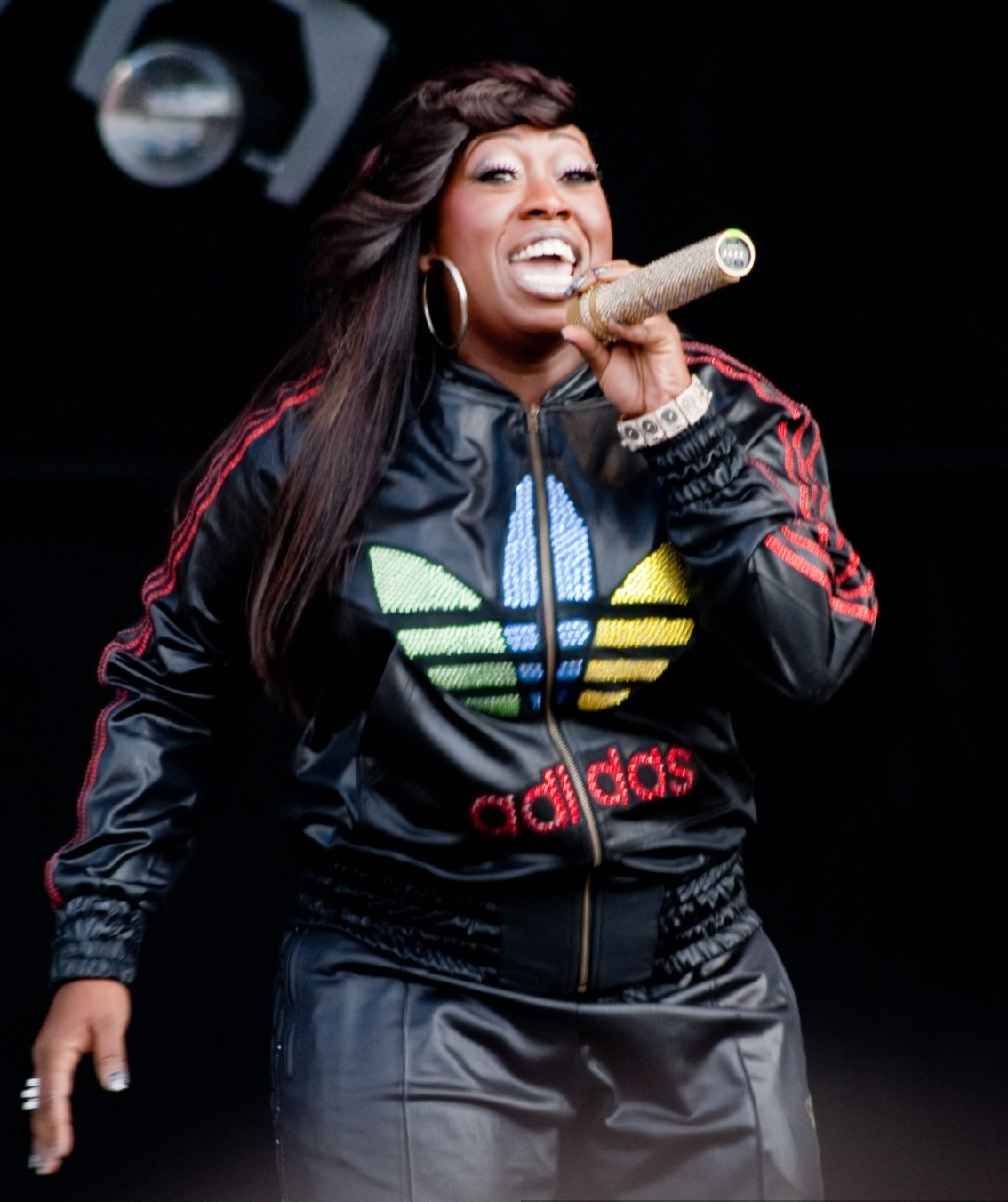
Elliott onstage in 2006

Elliott wanted to "give people the unexpected" by utilizing producers other than Timbaland and a "more to the center" sound not as far left as her other music. Her sixth solo album, The Cookbook was released on July 4, 2005, debuted at number two on the U.S. charts and was later certified platinum in 2022 by the Recording Industry Association of America (RIAA) for selling over 1,000,000 copies in the United States. Elliott's work during The Cookbook era was heavily recognized. Elliott received 5 Grammy nominations in 2005, including one for Best Rap Album for The Cookbook. The album's first single, "Lose Control", won a Grammy for Best Short Form Video and was nominated for Best Rap Song. "Lose Control" also garnered Elliott six 2005 MTV VMA award nominations (winning Best Dance Video and Best Hip-Hop Video). Elliott won Best Female Hip Hop Artist at the 2005 American Music Awards, and was nominated for Best International Female Artist at the 2006 BRIT Awards.

"Lose Control" featuring Ciara and Fatman Scoop, became a Top 5 hit in the midyear (peaking at number three on the Billboard Hot 100). The second single, Teary Eyed, did not chart, although the video charted on MTV's TRL for a few weeks, and BET's 106 & Park for a few days. The third single, "We Run This", was released with heavy airplay on VH1, MTV, and BET. It served as the lead single for the soundtrack to the gymnastics-themed film Stick It. The song was also nominated for a Grammy Award in the Best Rap Solo Performance category in 2006. Respect M.E., Elliott's first greatest hits album, was released outside the United States and Canada on September 4, 2006, only in South Africa, Australia, Europe, Japan, and Brazil. The collection became her second top ten album in the UK and her highest-charting album to date, peaking at number seven there.

=== 2007–2014: Production focus ===
Elliott was an honoree of the 2007 VH1 Hip Hop Honors. In honor of her career, many artists performed some of her biggest hits. Timbaland and Tweet performed "The Rain (Supa Dupa Fly)", Eve and Keyshia Cole performed "Hot Boyz" and "Work It", Fatman Scoop and Ciara performed "Lose Control", and Nelly Furtado performed "Get Ur Freak On (The Remix)". Since 2007, Elliott's seventh studio album has had several different forms with extensive delays. In 2007, she worked with Timbaland, Swizz Beatz, Danja, T-Pain and DJ Toomp and planned to release an album at the beginning of 2008. In January 2008, "Ching-a-Ling" was released as the lead single for the Step Up 2: The Streets soundtrack, which also featured "Shake Your Pom Pom" produced by Timbaland. Elliott released the song "Best, Best" in the same year and renamed the album's previous title FANomenal to its tentative title Block Party. She later decided against Block Party and four years later, in 2012, Elliott released two Timbaland-produced singles ("9th Inning" and "Triple Threat") exclusively to iTunes. Though the songs managed to chart on Billboard Hot Digital Songs, in an interview with Yahoo's The Yo Show, Missy talked about her hiatus from making records: "Your brain needs time to refresh! Things happen in your life where you can then write something else instead of the same three topics. Like, how many times we gonna talk about the club? I gotta feel like what I'm giving the fans is 100 percent and that it's game-changing. I don't just throw out microwave records."

In between the recording of her seventh album, Missy Elliott found success behind the scenes. Elliott's writing and production helped her reach No. 1 on Billboard's Hot R&B/Hip-Hop Songs with Keyshia Cole's "Let It Go" (2007), Jazmine Sullivan's "Need U Bad" (2008), and Monica's "Everything to Me" (2010). Since 2008, songs written and/or produced by Elliott for Fantasia ("Free Yourself"), Jennifer Hudson ("I'm His Only Woman"), Monica ("Everything to Me"), Keyshia Cole ("Let It Go"), and Jazmine Sullivan ("Need U Bad" and "Holding You Down (Goin' in Circles)") have all received Grammy nominations. Both Fantasia's "Free Yourself" (2005) and Sullivan's "Holding You Down (Goin' In Circles)" reached No. 3 on Billboard's Hot R&B/Hip-Hop Songs. In mid-2010, Elliott embarked on a two-part tour with stops in Europe, Asia, Africa and Australia, while she also performed at VH1's "Hip Hop Honors: The Dirty South" in a tribute to Timbaland, performing "Get Ur Freak On" and "Work It". In 2008 she made an appearance in "Whatcha Think About That" by The Pussycat Dolls, and performed live in different places with them. In 2011 and 2012, Elliott made guest appearances on "All Night Long" by Demi Lovato, "Nobody's Perfect" by J. Cole, the remix of "Why Stop Now" by Busta Rhymes with Chris Brown and Lil Wayne, and a remix of Katy Perry's "Last Friday Night (T.G.I.F.)" that helped catapult "T.G.I.F". to No. 1 on the Billboard Hot 100. She also produced Monica's singles "Anything (To Find You)" and "Until It's Gone".

Throughout 2013, Missy Elliott was featured on Eve's album cut "Wanna Be", as well as international artists' singles, Little Mix's "How Ya Doin'?" and "NiLiria" with K-pop musician G-Dragon, which was named by Complex magazine as one of the "50 Best Songs of 2013". Elliott also contributed to her protégée Sharaya J's two releases, "Banji" and "Smash Up The Place/Snatch Yo Wigs". In December 2013, Elliott received a Grammy nomination with Fantasia and Kelly Rowland for their song "Without Me". As early as July 2013, Missy Elliott and Timbaland held recording sessions for Kat Dahlia's debut, My Garden (2015). In August 2013, R&B singer Faith Evans revealed that Missy Elliott would be featured on her sixth studio album, tentatively titled Incomparable. In March 2014, Evans revealed one of the tracks was named "I Deserve It", featuring Missy and her protégée Sharaya J, in which Evans cited it as a "banger" and "feel good" record. Evans also revealed that in total Elliott contributed three tracks to her album. On July 7, 2014, fellow R&B singer Monica confirmed that Elliott would be a feature on her upcoming eighth studio album. On July 29, 2014, a snippet of a Missy Elliott–produced song, nickname "I Love Him", premiered on Monica's official Instagram account.

=== 2015–2018: Super Bowl XLIX halftime show and singles ===
In 2015, Elliott performed at the Super Bowl XLIX halftime show with Katy Perry. Elliott performed a medley of "Get Ur Freak On", "Work It", and "Lose Control". The performance was well-received, and boosted digital sales of Elliott's work that week, with a twenty-five-fold increase in album sales (to 2,000 units) and a ten-fold increase in sales of the three songs she performed (to 71,000 units) compared to the week before. It also became the most watched Super Bowl halftime show in NFL history, receiving 118.5 million viewers in the United States. On February 3, 2015, it was confirmed that Elliott would be a feature on the upcoming remix to Diplo and Skrillex's "Take Ü There". On February 11, Elliott stated that she was still in the process of recording her seventh studio album, Block Party, with Timbaland. On April 2, 2015, Pharrell Williams confirmed that he was working on Elliott's album during an episode of The Tonight Show with Jimmy Fallon. On November 12, 2015, "WTF (Where They From)" and its music video were simultaneously released to digital outlets. By November 19, the song and its video had been streamed 6.1 million times in the US alone, with an additional count of 16 million views per YouTube viewing.

On February 7, 2016, the day of the fiftieth Super Bowl, Elliott released a promotional single, "Pep Rally". Later that month, Elliott reunited with former protégée Tweet and frequent collaborator Timbaland on the cut "Somebody Else Will" taken from the former's third studio album, Charlene. By March 15, 2016, First Lady Michelle Obama proclaimed that she had assembled a collaborative track featuring vocals from Missy Elliott, Kelly Clarkson, Janelle Monáe and Zendaya alongside production credit from pop songwriter Diane Warren and Elliott titled "This Is for My Girls". The record was used to both coincide with Ms. Obama's SXSW speech and to promote her third-world educational initiative Let Girls Learn.

Following a surprise appearance with TLC on the 2016 televised special Taraji's White Hot Holidays, Elliott announced plans to release a documentary chronicling her impact on the production scene in both audio and video. The midnight of January 27, 2017, saw the full-length release to a new Elliott single titled "I'm Better", featuring production and vocal assistance from recurring sideman Lamb and shared directing credit by Elliott and longtime colleague Dave Meyers.

In July 2018, Missy Elliott teased fans by appearing on a snippet nicknamed "ID" by Skrillex, released in 2023 as RATATA. One month later, Elliott appeared on the Ariana Grande number "Borderline", taken from the singer's fourth studio album Sweetener (2018). In October 2018, Elliott announced that she is working on her new album, which would be released in 2019. On March 20, 2019, Lizzo released a collaboration with Elliott titled "Tempo".

=== 2019–present: EP, further collaborations, and Out Of This World tour ===
On June 13, 2019, Elliott was inducted to the Songwriters Hall of Fame, becoming the first female rapper to receive this honor. Elliott received an honorary Doctor of Music degree from Berklee College of Music, and the Michael Jackson Video Vanguard Award. She was also the first female rapper to receive the award.

Elliott released her first extended play on August 23, 2019, titled Iconology. The five-track EP features a variety of musical genres that cover the breadth of her career as an artist and has received favorable reviews from critics. Upon release of the album, she also released the lead single, "Throw It Back", with a music video featuring Teyana Taylor. Musically, Iconology is a pop, hip-hop and R&B EP reminiscent of Elliott's previous work. The opening track, "Throw It Back" contains "trap snares and a serpentine bassline", which along with the second track, "Cool Off", were described as "woozy, futuristic romps" containing "distorted bass lines and frenetic production". Lyrically, "Throw It Back" contains references to Elliott's history, as well as previous collaborators Tweet and Heavy D. Maura Johnson of Entertainment Weekly described "Cool Off" as calling "back to hip-hop's two-turntables-and-a-mic early days". "DripDemeanor" has been described as a slow jam that explores Elliott's "sensuous side". Musically, it contains "plush synths [that] skip-step underneath" the song's beat. "Why I Still Love You" is a doo-wop song with gospel influences and jazz influence that lyrically chronicles the singer's "conflicted emotions about holding on to a cheating lover". The EP closes with an a cappella version of "Why I Still Love You".

Elliott was motivated to write uplifting music to counter mainstream trends and encourage more dance music to feel good. "DripDemeanor" was released as the album's second single on October 22. "Why I Still Love You" was released as the third single on January 17, 2020. "Cool Off" was released as the fourth and final single from the EP on April 21, 2020. On June 26, 2020, Elliott appeared on the official remix to Toni Braxton's single "Do It". Elliott co-produced the track alongside Hannon Lane. On August 13, 2020, Elliott appeared on the remix single "Levitating" by Dua Lipa which also featured Madonna. The remix was produced by the Blessed Madonna. Unlike Madonna, Elliott appeared in the video. The music video was directed by Will Hooper.

On January 11, 2021, Elliott appeared on the single "ATM" by Bree Runway. She directed the music video for "Twerkulator" by the City Girls in July 2021.

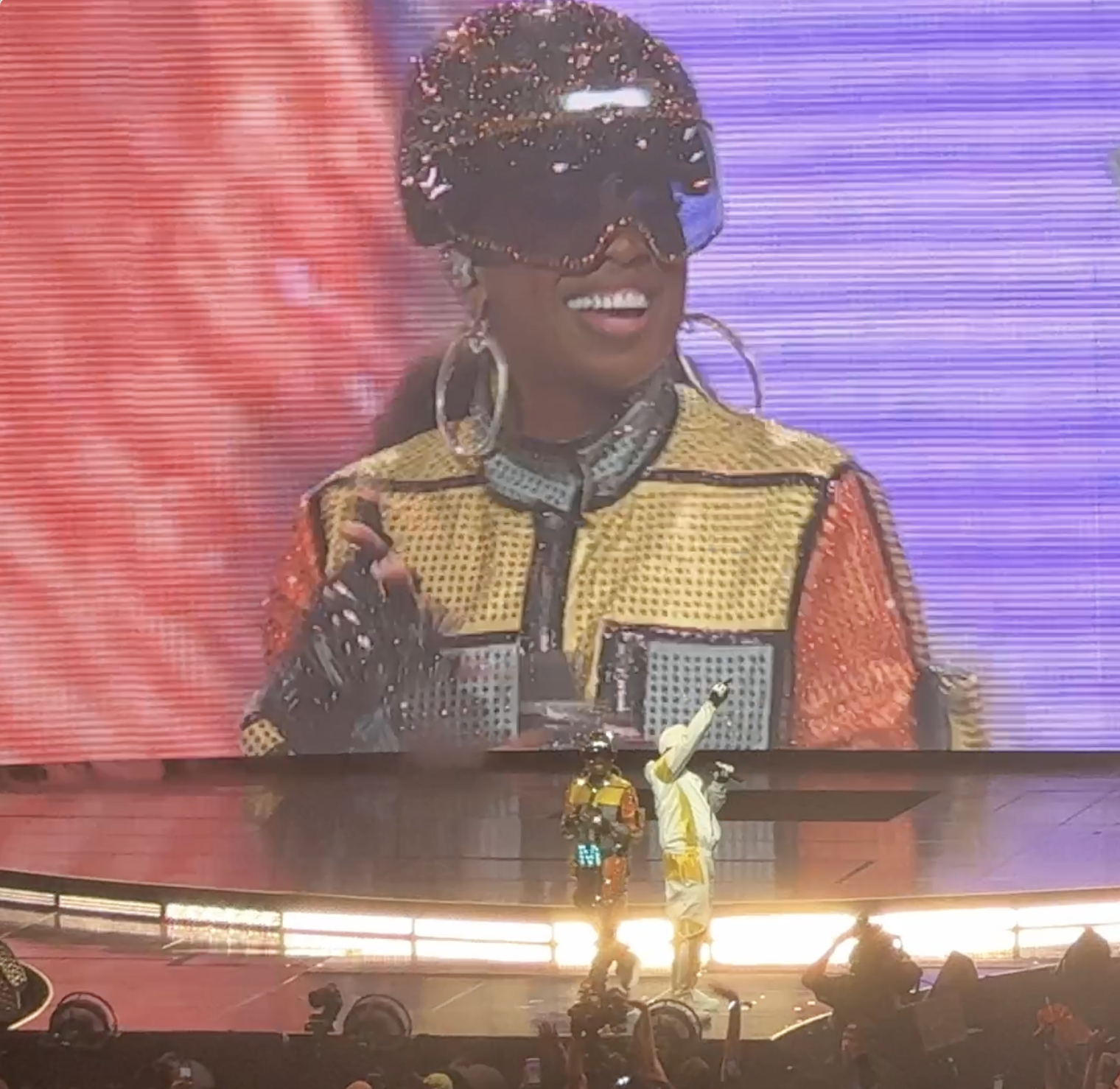
Missy Elliott on stage in Chicago during "Out of This World: The Missy Elliott Experience Tour"

On February 17, 2023, Elliott appeared on the track "RATATA" produced by Skrillex and Mr. Oizo, the second track on Skrillex's LP "Quest For Fire". This release confirmed rumors from 2018 regarding this collaboration, rumors that resurfaced in the months before the track's release as both Skrillex and Elliott teased the track on social media. On March 23, 2023, British group Flo released the single "Fly Girl", featuring Elliott; the song interpolates Elliott's "Work It", plus a new rap section.

On April 8, 2024, Elliott announced "Out of This World: The Missy Elliott Experience Tour," her first headlining tour of her career. The tour began on July 4 in Vancouver, Canada and featured Timbaland, Busta Rhymes and Ciara as its opening acts.

In an October 2025 interview with Rolling Stone, Elliott shared that she was working on new music, stating, "I have something in the works. It's just different. It's me being experimental again… I got some stuff coming. Some fire."

On April 10, 2026, singer Kehlani released the single "Back and Forth", which features Elliott; the single peaked at number 25 on the US Bubbling Under Hot 100 chart. On July 6, 2026, Elliott curated an Aaliyah tribute for the finale at that year's Essence Festival of Culture; the tribute featured performances of Aaliyah's best known songs by Mya, Chloe Bailey, Sevyn Streeter and Normani, use of AI video montages, and video tributes from Timbaland, Ginuwine, T-Boz, Monica and Queen Latifah.

== Other ventures ==
=== Film ===
In 2005, there were plans to make a biographical film about the life story of Elliott. It was to be co-produced by Robert De Niro and Jane Rosenthal, and written by Diane Houston. In mid-June 2007, Elliott said she was still working on the script with Houston in order "to come up with the right stuff 'cause I don't want it to be watered down. I want it to be raw and uncut the way my life was." Initially, it seemed Timbaland would not be a part of the movie. When Missy asked him, he refused, believing this dramatized his character; "the movie is about her life, her story, that goes deeper than putting me into the movie".

=== Philanthropy ===
In 2002, Elliott wrote a letter on behalf of PETA to the mayor of her hometown Portsmouth, Virginia, asking that all shelter animals be neutered/spayed before being adopted. For the reality TV show The Road to Stardom, there was a contest for viewers to create a public service ad for the Break the Cycle fund.

In 2004, she joined forces with MAC Cosmetics to promote their "Viva Glam" campaign. In addition to the ad campaign, Elliott promoted the MAC Viva Glam V lipstick from which 100% of the sale goes to the MAC AIDS Fund.

In 2007, Elliott appeared on ABC's Extreme Makeover and awarded four scholarships for a weight loss program to four underprivileged teens.

In August 2017, a 27-year-old Virginia man named Nathan Coflin began a Change.org petition that gained over 30,000 signatures in support of a statue to honor Elliott's philanthropic endeavors to be erected in her hometown of Portsmouth, Virginia. On the petition's proposed site for this statue a Confederate Monument previously stood. This led to widespread media coverage in several national publications including The Washington Post, HuffPost, Newsweek and Time Magazine.

In October 2022, a portion of McLean Street in Portsmouth, Virginia was renamed "Missy Elliott Boulevard".

== Reputation and influence ==
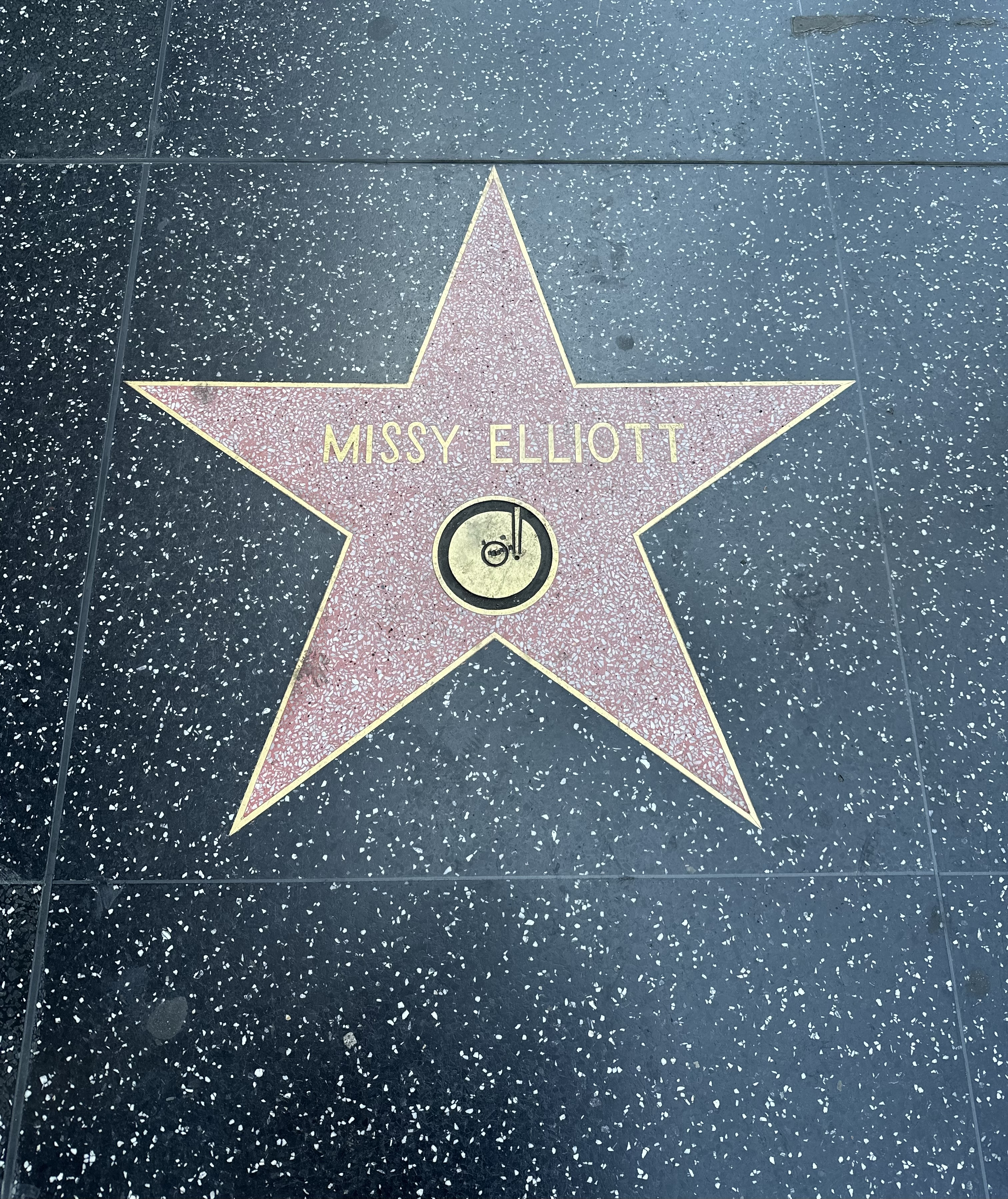
Missy Elliot's star on the Hollywood Walk of Fame

Elliott has been referred to as the "Queen of Rap", the "Queen of Hip Hop", and the "First Lady of Hip Hop" by several media outlets. Elliott's experimental concepts in her music videos changed the landscape of what a hip-hop video had as themes at the time. Her catalogue of songs has included themes of feminism, gender equality, body positivity and sex positivity since the beginning of her career, being one of the first to center on these topics among hip-hop and R&B performers. The Guardian and The Observer considered her America's first Black female music mogul, as she gained in 2001 total control over her image and music, and the opportunity to sign artists. The Observer's Ted Kessler stated that, with her studio albums, she has "revolutionized the sound of R&B and hip-hop" and reintroduced the notion "of fun and fantasy" to urban Black music—a style that matched the "futuristic, much-copied new sound" of her 1997 debut album, Supa Dupa Fly. Destiny's Child, Eve and Macy Gray have credited her for "clearing a path" in the American music industry towards "their own pop pre-eminence" as Black female R&B/hip-hop performers. The Recording Academy and Evening Standard have called her a "hip hop icon". The Economist considered that Elliott "is to rap what Prince was to R&B" due to their "impact upon the genre" and her ability to "weave in styles and strands from outside it".

The New Yorker stated that Elliott became the first Black female rapper to reach the mainstream in Middle America. An article from Vibe credits Elliott's debut album Supa Dupa Fly for "changing the rap game for women", noting the rapper's "refusal to be pigeonholed" with her image, and instead, embraced "the complexities inherent with Black womanhood", with the author commenting that female rappers tend to be placed into one of two categories: androgyny or hyper-sexualization. The New York Times and The Bulletin have called her the "Queen of the Beats". Jem Aswad of Variety commented that Elliott and longtime collaborator Timbaland "reshaped the sound of hip-hop", as they made songs "out of pings and bips and bloops (both vocal and electronic) that quickly became part of the foundation of virtually all that followed." Similarly, Doreen St. Félix of The New Yorker wrote that her debut album "expanded the definition of rap" and "defined a new hip-hop aesthetic", with Elliott and Timbaland developing a grammar by "collecting extra-musical noises", "crafting" a new R&B sound, and incorporating a "singsong technique" in her flow. The author noted that, a generation later, the majority of rappers "are also vocalists". For Los Angeles Times writer Gerrick D. Kennedy, Elliott "ushered in a new era of creatively ambitious music videos". The aesthetic for the music video for "The Rain (Supa Dupa Fly)" inspired several others released afterward. Commercially, Missy Elliott led female hip-hop album sales during the late 1990s and early 2000s. Missy Elliott in addition to Timbaland, Pharrell Williams and The Clipse are considered to have an intricate part of establishing Virginia as one of the East Coast's strongholds in hip-hop. As of 2015, she has remained the best selling female rap album artist in the US. ABC website editor Gab Burke expressed that Elliott "railed against the male-dominated mainstream rap scene throughout her career, constantly pushed the boundaries, and cemented a place for women in hip hop".

Elliott has influenced various musicians, both visually and vocally. Her work has been cited as an inspiration by acts such as Cardi B, Lil Wayne, Lizzo, Tyler, the Creator, Solange Knowles, Chloe Bailey, M.I.A., Janelle Monáe, Anderson .Paak, Rapsody, Ciara, Bree Runway, Doja Cat, Ivy Queen, Ari Lennox, Tayla Parx, Sean Bankhead, ASAP Ferg, Leikeli47, Tierra Whack, Noname, Okenyo, Little Simz, Coda Conduct, Dawn Richard, Banks, Rich the Kid, Crystal Caines, Coi Leray, Lady Leshurr, Stefflon Don, Flo Milli, Krept and Konan, Rye Rye, Le1f, Qveen Herby and Erica Banks.

== Achievements ==
Elliott has won four Grammy Awards, eight MTV Video Music Awards, two American Music Awards, six BET Awards, and a Billboard Women in Music award for Innovator. On June 13, 2019, Elliott was inducted to the Songwriters Hall of Fame, becoming the first female rapper to receive this honor, and the third overall, following Jay-Z and Jermaine Dupri. Also in 2019, Elliott received an honorary Doctor of Music degree from Berklee College of Music, and became the first female rapper to receive the Michael Jackson Video Vanguard Award at the MTV Video Music Awards.

In 2018, Elliott received Essence magazine's Black Women In Music honor. In 2020, Urban One presented her with the Music Innovation Award.

In May 2021, Elliott was among the inaugural inductees for the Black Music & Entertainment Walk of Fame. In November 2021, Elliott was honored with a star on the Hollywood Walk of Fame.

In December 2022, Elliott received a second honorary doctorate, this time from Norfolk State University, who also helped rename a Portsmouth street after her. She was also presented with a key to the city of Portsmouth.

In 2023, she became the first female hip-hop artist to receive a nomination for the Rock and Roll Hall of Fame, when she was nominated in her first year of eligibility. In November 2023, Elliott became the first female rapper in the Rock and Roll Hall of Fame. Billboard ranked her at number 40 on its 2025 "Top 100 Women Artists of the 21st Century" list.

== Personal life ==
Elliott said in 2008 that she wanted to start a family but was afraid of giving birth, stating, "I don't know if I can take that kind of pain. Maybe in the year 2020 you could just pop a baby out and it'd be fine. But right now I'd rather just adopt."

In June 2011, Elliott told People magazine that her absence from the music industry was due to having Graves' disease, with which she was diagnosed after she nearly crashed her car from having severe leg spasms while driving. She experienced severe symptoms from the condition and could not even hold a pen to write songs. After treatment, her symptoms stabilized.

== Discography ==
- Supa Dupa Fly (1997)
- Da Real World (1999)
- Miss E... So Addictive (2001)
- Under Construction (2002)
- This Is Not a Test! (2003)
- The Cookbook (2005)
- Memoir’s of The Supa Dupa Fly (2027)

== Filmography ==
=== Film ===
Year	Title	Role	Notes
2001	Pootie Tang	Diva	
2003	Ultrasound: Hip Hop Dollars	Herself	Documentary
2003	Honey	Herself	
2004	Fade to Black	Herself	Documentary
2004	Shark Tale	Missy	Voice role
2005	Just for Kicks	Herself	Documentary
2024	Piece by Piece	Herself	Voice role
—N/a	Golden	—N/a	Unreleased

=== Television ===
Year	Title	Role	Notes
1997	All That	Herself	Episodes: "702", "MC Lyte"
1997	Family Matters	Herself	Episode: "Original Gangster Dawg"
1998	The Wayans Bros.	Herself	Episode: "The Kiss"
2003	Eve	Herself	Episode: "Private Dancer"
2003	Punk'd	Herself	Episode: "Missy Elliott"
2005	The Road to Stardom with Missy Elliott	Herself	Reality series
2008	Ego Trip's Miss Rap Supreme	Herself	Reality series
2008	My Super Sweet 16	Herself	Episode: "Demetrius"
2008	America's Best Dance Crew	Judge assistant	Season 2
2009	Party Monsters Cabo	Herself	Episode: "Missy Elliott"
2010	What Chilli Wants	Herself	Episode: "What Chilli Wants"
2015	The Voice	Mentor assistant	Season 9
2016	American Dad!	YoYo	Voice role; episode: "Stan-Dan Deliver"
2016	Taraji P. Henson's White Hot Holidays	Herself	FOX television special
2017	Star	Pumpkin	2 episodes
2023	Craig of the Creek	Carla Frazier	Voice role; episode: "The Jump Off"

== Tours ==
Headlining

- Out of This World: The Missy Elliott Experience Tour (with Ciara and Busta Rhymes) (2024)

Co-headlining

- Lilith Fair Tour (with various artists) (1998)
- The Verizon Ladies First Tour (with Beyoncé, Tamia and Alicia Keys) (2004)
- Hip Hop: Don't Stop Tour (with Kelis and Talib Kweli) (2004)

Special guest

- All for You Tour (Janet Jackson) (2002)
- Anger Management Tour (Eminem and 50 Cent) (2003)
- Return of the Queen Tour (Lil' Kim) (2012)

Opening act

- Rainbow World Tour (Mariah Carey) (2000)
- Michael Jackson: 30th Anniversary Special (Michael Jackson) (2001)
- Rock the Mic Tour (Jay-Z and 50 Cent) (2003)
- Re-Invention World Tour (Madonna) (2004)
- Unbreakable World Tour (Janet Jackson) (2015)

== See also ==
- Honorific nicknames in popular music
- The Goldmind Inc.
