= Come into My Life (Joyce Sims album) =

Studio album by Joyce Sims
- Released: 1987; June 21, 1994 (US reissue)
- Recorded: 1985–1987
- Genre: Dance; funk; R&B
- Length: 46:21
- Label: Sleeping Bag; TLX-10: London; PolyGram 828 077; Sleeping Bag; Warlock (reissue); WAR-8705
- Producer: Kurtis Mantronik; Joyce Sims

Joyce Sims chronology
Come into My Life (1987)	All About Love (1989)

Alternative Cover
- European release

Professional ratings
Review scores
Source	Rating
New Musical Express	8/10

Come into My Life is the debut album by American singer-songwriter Joyce Sims, released in 1987. It was the first Sleeping Bag Records album to be released on compact disc in the United States, and it was licensed to London/PolyGram Records throughout Europe.

The album's title track became Sims's biggest hit single, reaching number 10 on the US Billboard R&B Chart and number 7 in the UK Singles Chart. The album contains the full version of the title track, the hard version of "Lifetime Love", and "(You Are My) All and All". However, for unknown reasons, the soft version of "Lifetime Love", despite getting as much radio airplay as the hard version, was not included—but the UK remix of "All and All" was.

Sims wrote all of the songs on the album except for "Love Makes a Woman", a cover of a Barbara Acklin song.

== Single releases ==
- "All and All" (peaked at 69 on the US Billboard R&B chart and number 16 on the UK Singles Chart)
- "Come into My Life" (US R&B number 10/UK number 7)
- "Lifetime Love" (US R&B number 23/UK number 34)
- "Love Makes a Woman" (US R&B number 29/UK number 85)
- "Walk Away" (US R&B number 56/UK number 24) released with remixes by Clivillés & Cole

== Track listing ==
All tracks written by Joyce Sims, unless otherwise noted.

No.	Title	Writer(s)	Length
1.	"Come into My Life"		7:49
2.	"Love Makes a Woman"	Eugene Record; Carl Davis; Will Sanders	4:09
3.	"It Wasn't Easy"		4:02
4.	"(You Are My) All and All"		6:11
5.	"Lifetime Love" (Hard Version)		6:22
6.	"A Change in You"		5:26
7.	"Walk Away"		5:10
8.	"The All and All UK Remix"		7:12

== Charts ==
Chart (1988)	Peak position
UK Albums Chart	5
US Top R&B/Hip-Hop Albums	22

== Certifications ==
Region	Certification	Certified units/sales
United Kingdom (BPI)	Gold	100,000^{^}
^{^} Shipments figures based on certification alone.
