= List of awards and nominations received by Missy Elliott =

Missy Elliott awards and nominations
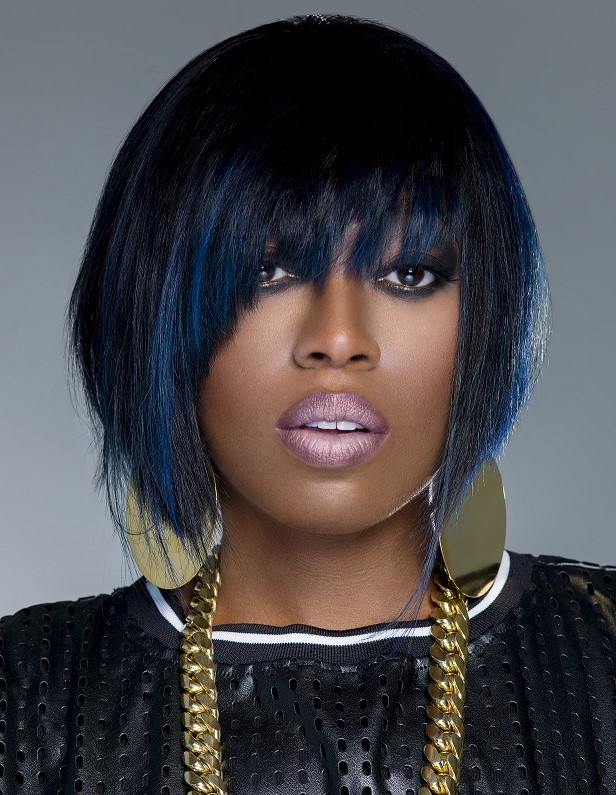
- Elliot in 2015
Awards and nominations
Award	Wins	Nominations
American Music Awards	2	3
BET Awards	9	19
Grammy Awards	5	23
MOBO Awards	1	4
MTV Video Music Awards	8	56
Soul Train Lady of Soul Awards	3	9
Teen Choice Awards	6	11

Totals (Note: Certain award groups do not simply award one winner. They acknowledge several different recipients, have runners-up, and have third place. Since this is a specific recognition and is different from losing an award, runner-up mentions are considered wins in this award tally. For simplification and to avoid errors, each award in this list has been presumed to have had a prior nomination.)
- Wins: 94
- Nominations: 360

Missy Elliott is an American rapper. Her debut album Supa Dupa Fly was released on July 15, 1997, in the United States under her own label The Goldmind Inc. signed under Elektra Records. Her second album Da Real World was then released on June 22, 1999, followed by her third album Miss E... So Addictive, released on May 15, 2001. Under Construction was the fourth album released by Elliott, which was released on November 12, 2002, followed by her fifth album This Is Not a Test! that saw a release on November 25, 2003, and The Cookbook, Elliott's latest album to date, which was released on July 4, 2005.

Throughout Missy Elliott's career, she has received several awards and nominations. Her debut, Supa Dupa Fly (1997) and the single "The Rain (Supa Dupa Fly)" would go on to score two Grammy nominations for Best Rap Album and Best Rap Solo Performance, alongside three MTV Music Video Awards nominations for "Best Direction in a Video," "Best Breakthrough Video" & "Best Rap Video".

Missy Elliott's second album Da Real World (1999) attained a Grammy nomination for Best Rap Album. She also received an award for "Best R&B/Soul or Rap Music Video" by the Soul Train Awards. The album went platinum in the US, making it Elliott's second platinum album. The follow-up, Miss E... So Addictive (2001), was also a commercial success. This album would attain twelve MTV Video Music Awards nominations throughout 2001 and 2002. Additionally, the effort gained Elliott several nominations from various award shows some including, the Grammy Awards, MTV Video Music Awards, and the BET Awards.

On March 27, 2001, Lil' Kim, Christina Aguilera, Pink, and Mýa recorded a cover version of the LaBelle song, "Lady Marmalade" as a medley for the feature film Moulin Rouge! that Missy Elliott produced, which topped the Billboard Hot 100 for seven weeks.

Missy Elliott's fourth album Under Construction (2002) was certified double platinum, making it her fourth platinum album. The effort gained Elliott eight MTV Video Music Awards in 2003, taking two awards for "Video of the Year & "Best Hip-Hop Video". The album also gained Elliott five Grammy nominations in 2004 for Best Rap Performance by a Duo or Group, Best Rap Album, Album of The Year, Best Rap Song & Best Female Rap Solo Performance taking an award for Best Female Rap Solo Performance. Elliott's follow-up This Is Not a Test! (2003) would also attain a platinum certification, as well as two MTV Video Music Awards and one MTV Music Video Japan Awards nominations.

The Cookbook (2005) is Missy Elliott's latest album to date. The effort attained three Grammy nominations in 2006 for Best Short Form Music Video, Best Rap Song & Best Rap Album. Elliott received the award for Best Short Form Music Video for her single "Lose Control". The Cookbook also gained Elliott seven MTV Video Music Awards nominations, taking two awards for "Best Dance Video" and "Best Hip-Hop Video". In 2014, Missy Elliott became nominated for a Grammy for Best R&B Song for the featured single, "Without Me".

== American Music Awards ==
The American Music Awards is an annual music awards ceremony and one of several major annual American music awards shows. is an annual music awards ceremony and one of several major annual American music awards shows.

Year	Nominee / work	Award	Result
2003	Herself	Favorite Rap/Hip-Hop Female Artist	Won
2003	"Under Construction"	Favorite Rap/Hip-Hop Album	Nominated
2005	Herself	Favorite Rap/Hip-Hop Female Artist	Won

== ASCAP ==
=== ASCAP Film and Television Music Awards ===
Year	Nominee / work	Award	Result
2002	" On"	Most Performed Songs from Motion Pictures	Won

=== ASCAP Pop Music Awards ===
Year	Nominee / work	Award	Result
2004	"Work It"	Award Winning Songs	Won
2006	"1, 2 Step" (with Ciara)	Most Performed Songs	Won
2006	"Lose Control"	Most Performed Songs	Won
2008	"Let It Go" (with Keyshia Cole & Lil' Kim)	Most Performed Songs	Won

=== ASCAP Rhythm & Soul Awards ===
Year	Nominee / work	Award	Result
1998	"Not Tonight" (with Lisa "Left Eye" Lopes of TLC, Da Brat, Angie Martinez, Lil' Kim)	Top R&B/Hip-Hop Song	Won
1999	"Make It Hot" (with Nicole Wray, Timbaland, Mocha)	Award-Winning R&B Songs	Won
2000	"Where My Girls At?" (with 702, co-written and co-produced by Missy Elliott)	Top R&B/Hip-Hop Song	Won
2001	"Hot Boyz"	R&S Award-Winning R&B/Hip-Hop Songs	Won
2001	"Hot Boyz"	Top Rap Song	Won
2002	"Get Ur Freak On"	Top R&B/Hip-Hop Song	Won
2003	"Work It"	Top R&B/Hip-Hop Song	Won
2003	"Gossip Folks" (featuring Ludacris)	Top R&B/Hip-Hop Song	Won
2003	"So Gone" (with Monica, produced and written by Missy Elliott)	Top R&B/Hip-Hop Song	Won
2004	"So Gone" (with Monica, produced and written by Missy Elliott)	Award Winning R&B/Hip Hop Songs	Won
2004	"Work It"	Award Winning Rap Songs	Won
2004	"Gossip Folks"	Award Winning Rap Songs	Won
2006	"1, 2 Step" (with Ciara)	Award Winning R&B/Hip Hop Songs	Won
2006	"Free Yourself" (with Fantasia)	Award Winning R&B/Hip Hop Songs	Won
2008	"Let It Go" (with Keyshia Cole & Lil' Kim)	Award Winning R&B/Hip Hop Songs	Won

== Berklee College of Music ==
Year	Nominee / work	Award	Result
2019	"Missy Elliott"	Honorary Doctorate	Won

== BET ==
=== BET Awards ===
Missy Elliott has won 6 BET Awards including 5 times for 'Best Female Hip-Hop Artist'.

Year	Nominee / work	Award	Result
2001	Herself	Best Female Hip-Hop Artist	Nominated
2002	Herself	Best Female Hip-Hop Artist	Won
2002	"One Minute Man"	Video of the Year	Nominated
2003	"Work It	Video of the Year	Nominated
2003	"Work It	Viewer's Choice	Nominated
2003	"Gossip Folks"	Best Collaboration	Nominated
2003	Herself	Best Female Hip-Hop Artist	Won
2004	Herself	Best Female Hip-Hop Artist	Won
2005	"1, 2 Step" (with Ciara)	Viewer's Choice	Nominated
2005	"1, 2 Step" (with Ciara)	Best Collaboration	Won
2006	"Touch It" (with Busta Rhymes)	Best Collaboration	Nominated
2006	"Lose Control"	Video of the Year	Nominated
2006	Herself	Best Female Hip-Hop Artist	Won
2008	Herself	Best Female Hip-Hop Artist	Won
2008	"Let It Go" (with Keyshia Cole & Lil' Kim)	Best Collaboration	Nominated
2008	"Let It Go" (with Keyshia Cole & Lil' Kim)	Viewer's Choice	Nominated
2010	Herself	Best Female Hip-Hop Artist	Nominated
2016	Herself	Best Female Hip-Hop Artist	Nominated
2017	Herself	Best Female Hip-Hop Artist	Nominated

=== BET Hip-Hop Awards ===
Year	Nominee / work	Award	Result
2006	"Lose Control" (with Missy Elliott)	Best Hip-Hop Collaboration	Nominated
2006	Herself	Best Hot Ticket Performer	Nominated
2006	"Touch It" (with Busta Rhymes)	Best Hip-Hop Collaboration	Won
2009	Herself	Salute to the Sisters of Hip-Hop Honor	Won
2021	Herself	Video Director of the Year	Won

== Black Girls Rock! Awards ==
Year	Nominee / work	Award	Result
2007	Herself	Creative Visionary	Won
2010	Herself	Visionary	Won

== Billboard Music Awards ==
=== Billboard Music Awards & Billboard R&B/Hip-Hop Awards ===
Year	Nominee / work	Award	Result
2001	Herself	Female R&B/Hip-Hop Artist of the Year	Won
2003	Herself	Top Female R&B/Hip-Hop Artist of the Year	Won
2003	"Work It"	Hot Rap Track	Won
2005	Herself	Hot 100 Airplay of the Year	Nominated
2005	"1, 2 Step"	Ringtone of the Year	Nominated

=== Billboard Women in Music Awards ===
The Billboard Women in Music Awards is an annual awards ceremony presented by Billboard magazine. Elliott was honored with an award on its 10th edition.

Year	Nominee / work	Award	Result
2015	Herself	Innovator	Won

== Brit Awards ==
Year	Nominee / work	Award	Result
1999	I Want You Back ft. Mel B	Video of the Year	Nominated
2003	Herself	Best International Female	Nominated
2004	Herself	Best International Female	Nominated
2006	Herself	Best International Female	Nominated

== DanceStar Awards ==
Year	Nominee / work	Award	Result
2003	"4 My People"	Best Video	Won

== EME Awards ==
Year	Nominee / work	Award	Result
2009	Herself (with John Legend)	Friend of Reggae	Won

== Essence Black Women In Music ==
Year	Nominee / work	Award	Result
2018	Missy Elliott	Visionary Award	Won

== Grammy Awards ==
Missy Elliott has received four Grammy Awards: 3 for her solo rap career ("Get Ur Freak On," "Scream aka Itchin" and "Work It"), and 1 for her music video work ("Lose Control"). Her nominations span three consecutive decades. In total, Elliott's six studio albums garnered 22 nominations. Five of six of Elliott's albums were nominated in any Grammy category, and four received Best Rap Album nominations.

Year	Nominee / work	Award	Result
1998	"Not Tonight (Ladies Night)" (with Lil' Kim, Angie Martinez, Da Brat & Lisa "Left Eye" Lopes of TLC)	Best Rap Performance by a Duo or Group	Nominated
1998	"The Rain (Supa Dupa Fly)"	Best Rap Solo Performance	Nominated
1998	Supa Dupa Fly	Best Rap Album	Nominated
2000	Da Real World	Best Rap Album	Nominated
2002	"One Minute Man"	Best Short Form Music Video	Nominated
2002	"Get Ur Freak On"	Best R&B Song	Nominated
2002	"Get Ur Freak On"	Best Rap Solo Performance	Won
2003	"The Knoc" (with Dr. Dre & Knoc-turn'al)	Best Short Form Music Video	Nominated
2003	"Scream a.k.a. Itchin"	Best Female Rap Solo Performance	Won
2004	"Gossip Folks" (featuring Ludacris)	Best Rap Performance by a Duo or Group	Nominated
2004	Under Construction	Best Rap Album	Nominated
2004	Under Construction	Album of the Year	Nominated
2004	"Work It"	Best Rap Song	Nominated
2004	"Work It"	Best Female Rap Solo Performance	Won
2006	"1, 2 Step" (with Ciara)	Best Rap/Sung Collaboration	Nominated
2006	"Free Yourself" (with Fantasia Barrino)	Best R&B Song	Nominated
2006	"Lose Control" (featuring Ciara & Fatman Scoop)	Best Rap Song	Nominated
2006	"Lose Control" (featuring Ciara & Fatman Scoop)	Best Short Form Music Video	Won
2006	The Cookbook	Best Rap Album	Nominated
2007	"We Run This"	Best Rap Solo Performance	Nominated
2008	"Let It Go" (with Keyshia Cole & Lil' Kim)	Best Rap/Sung Collaboration	Nominated
2014	"Without Me" (with Fantasia & Kelly Rowland)	Best R&B Song	Nominated
2023	Missy Elliott	Global Impact Award	Honored

== Hollywood Walk of Fame ==
Year	Nominee / work	Award	Result
2021	Missy Elliott	Induction to the pass of fame	Won

== Songwriters Hall of Fame ==
The songwriters hall of fame brings together composer prodigies.

Year	Nominee / work	Award	Result
2021	Missy Elliott	The first rapper in the hall of fame	Won

== Hungarian Music Awards ==
The Hungarian Music Awards have been given to artists in the field of Hungarian music since 1992. The award categories are similar to Grammy Awards in the United States and Brit Awards in the United Kingdom. The awards were known as the Golden Giraffe Awards until 2003. Missy Elliott has won 1 award.

Year	Nominee / work	Award	Result
2002	Miss E... So Addictive	Best International Rap/Hip-Hop Album	Won

== International Dance Music Awards ==
Year	Nominee / work	Award	Result
2002	"Get Ur Freak On"	Best Rap/Hip-Hop Track	Won
2003	"Work It"	Best Rap/Hip-Hop Track	Won
2004	"Pass That Dutch"	Best Dance Video	Won
2006	"Lose Control"	Best R&B/Urban Dance Track	Won
2006	"Lose Control"	Best Rap/Hip Hop Dance Track	Nominated
2006	"Lose Control"	Best Dance Video	Won

== MTV ==
=== MTV Asia Awards ===
Year	Nominee / work	Award	Result
2002	"Lady Marmalade"	Favorite Video	Nominated

=== MTV Music Video Japan Awards ===
Year	Nominee / work	Award	Result
2002	"Lady Marmalade" (with Mýa, Pink, Lil' Kim, Christina Aguilera)	Best Video from a Film	Won
2003	Work It	Best Hip-Hop Video	Nominated
2004	This Is Not a Test!	Album of the Year	Nominated
2004	Pass That Dutch	Video of the Year	Won
2004	Pass That Dutch	Best Hip-Hop Video	Nominated
2004	Herself	Best Live Performance	Nominated
2005	"Car Wash" (with Christina Aguilera)	Best Video from a Film	Nominated
2006	"Lose Control"	Best Collaboration	Nominated

=== MTV Europe Awards ===
Year	Nominee / work	Award	Result
1998	Herself	Best Rap	Nominated
2000	Herself	Best Hip-Hop Artist	Nominated
2001	Herself	Best Hip-Hop Artist	Nominated
2003	"Work It"	Best Video	Nominated
2003	Herself	Best Hip-Hop Artist	Nominated
2005	Herself	Best Female Artist	Nominated
2005	Herself	Best Hip-Hop Artist	Nominated
2006	Herself	Best Hip-Hop Artist	Nominated

=== MTV Video Music Awards ===
The MTV Video Music Awards (VMAs) is an award show by the cable network MTV to honor the top music videos of the year. It was first held at the end of the summer of 1984, and originally as an alternative to the Grammy Award in the video category. Missy Elliott has won 15 VMAs out of 45 nominations.

Year	Nominee / work	Award	Result
1997	"The Rain (Supa Dupa Fly)"	Best Direction in a Video	Nominated
1997	"The Rain (Supa Dupa Fly)"	Breakthrough Video	Nominated
1997	"The Rain (Supa Dupa Fly)"	Best Rap Video	Nominated
2001	"Get Ur Freak On"	Best Cinematography in a Video	Nominated
2001	"Get Ur Freak On"	Best Editing in a Video	Nominated
2001	"Get Ur Freak On"	Best Special Effects in a Video	Nominated
2001	"Get Ur Freak On"	Best Hip Hop Video	Nominated
2001	"Get Ur Freak On"	Best Female Video	Nominated
2001	"Get Ur Freak On"	Video of the Year	Nominated
2001	"Lady Marmalade"	Best Art direction in a Video	Nominated
2001	"Lady Marmalade"	Best Video from a film	Won
2001	"Lady Marmalade"	Best Choreography in a Video	Nominated
2001	"Lady Marmalade"	Best Dance Video	Nominated
2001	"Lady Marmalade"	Best Pop Video	Nominated
2001	"Lady Marmalade"	Video of the Year	Won
2002	"One Minute Man" (with Ludacris and Trina)	Best Cinematography in a Video	Nominated
2002	"One Minute Man" (with Ludacris and Trina)	Best Editing in a Video	Nominated
2002	"One Minute Man" (with Ludacris and Trina)	Best Art Direction in a Video	Nominated
2002	"One Minute Man" (with Ludacris and Trina)	Best Special Effects in a Video	Nominated
2002	"One Minute Man" (with Ludacris and Trina)	Best Direction in a Video	Nominated
2002	"One Minute Man" (with Ludacris and Trina)	Best Hip-Hop Video	Nominated
2003	"Work It"	Best Cinematography in a Video	Nominated
2003	"Work It"	Best Art Direction in a Video	Nominated
2003	"Work It"	Best Editing in a Video	Nominated
2003	"Work It"	Best Direction in a Video	Nominated
2003	"Work It"	Best Special Effects in a Video	Nominated
2003	"Work It"	Best Hip-Hop Video	Won
2003	"Work It"	Best Female Video	Nominated
2003	"Work It"	Video of the Year	Won
2004	"I'm Really Hot"	Best Dance Video	Nominated
2004	"I'm Really Hot"	Best Choreography in a Video	Nominated
2005	"Lose Control"	Best Special Effects in a Video	Nominated
2005	"Lose Control"	Best Choreography in a Video	Nominated
2005	"Lose Control"	Best Direction in a Video	Nominated
2005	"Lose Control"	Breakthrough Video	Nominated
2005	"Lose Control"	Best Dance Video	Won
2005	"Lose Control"	Best Hip-Hop Video	Won
2005	"1,2 Step (with Ciara)"	Best New Artist in a Video	Nominated
2006	"We Run This"	Best Special Effects in a Video	Won
2008	"Ching-a-Ling"/"Shake Your Pom Pom 3D"	Best Special Effects	Nominated
2016	"WTF (Where They From)"	Best Choreography	Nominated
2019	Missy Elliott	Michael Jackson Video Vanguard Award	Won

== MOBO Awards ==
Year	Nominee / work	Award	Result
1997	"The Rain (Supa Dupa Fly)"	Best Video	Nominated
1998	Herself	Best International Act	Nominated
2001	Herself	Best Hip-Hop Act	Won
2001	"Get Ur Freak On"	Best Single	Nominated

== MuchMusic Video Awards ==
Year	Nominee / work	Award	Result
2003	"Work It"	Best International Video – Artist	Nominated
2004	"Pass That Dutch"	Best International Video – Artist	Nominated

== NAACP Awards ==
Year	Nominee / work	Award	Result
1999	Herself	Outstanding Rap Artist	Nominated
2002	"Work It"	Outstanding Song	Won
2002	Herself	Outstanding Female Artist	Nominated
2003	Herself	Outstanding Female Artist	Nominated
2013	Herself	Outstanding Female Artist	Nominated
2021	"Cool Off"	Outstanding Hip Hop/Rap Song	Nominated

== NME Awards ==
Year	Nominee / work	Award	Result
2002	Herself	Best Hip Hop/Rap Act	Won

== Nickelodeon Kids' Choice Awards ==
Year	Nominee / work	Award	Result
2006	"1, 2 Step" (with Ciara)	Favorite Song	Nominated

== People's Choice Awards ==
Year	Nominee / work	Award	Result
2005	"Car Wash" (with Christina Aguilera)	Favorite Remake	Nominated
2005	"Car Wash" (with Christina Aguilera)	Favorite Combined Forces	Nominated

== Shorty Awards ==
The Shorty Awards, also known as the "Shortys", is an annual awards show recognizing the people and organizations that produce real-time short form content across Twitter, Facebook, Tumblr, YouTube, Instagram and the rest of the social web. Missy Elliott has received one nomination.

Year	Nominee / work	Award	Result
2020	Herself	Best in Music (Arts & Entertainment)	Nominated

== Soul Train ==
=== Soul Train Music Awards ===
Year	Nominee / work	Award	Result
1998	"One in a Million" (with Aaliyah)	Best R&B/Soul Single	Nominated
1998	"The Rain (Supa Dupa Fly)"	Best R&B/Soul or Rap Music Video	Nominated
2002	"Get Ur Freak On"	Best R&B/Soul or Rap Music Video	Won
2003	"Work It"	Best R&B/Soul or Rap Music Video	Won
2006	"Lose Control"	Best R&B/Soul or Rap Dance Cut	Won
2006	"Lose Control"	Best R&B/Soul or Rap Music Video	Nominated
2023	"Fly Girl" (with Flo)	Best Collaboration	Nominated

=== Soul Train Lady of Soul Awards ===
Year	Nominee / work	Award	Result
1998	"Not Tonight" (with Lil' Kim)	Best Video by a Female	Won
1999	"Where My Girls At?" (with 702)	Best R&B/Soul Single - Group, Band or Duo	Nominated
2000	"Hot Boyz"	Best R&B/Soul or Rap Music Video	Nominated
2001	"Get Ur Freak On"	Best R&B/Soul or Rap Music Video	Nominated
2002	"One Minute Man"	Best R&B/Soul or Rap Music Video	Nominated
2003	"Work It"	Best R&B/Soul or Rap Music Video	Won
2003	"Work It"	R&B/Soul or Rap Song of the Year	Nominated
2005	"1, 2 Step (with Ciara)	Best R&B/Soul or Rap Dance Cut	Nominated
2005	"Lose Control"	Best R&B/Soul or Rap Music Video	Won

== SPIN Awards ==
Year	Nominee / work	Award	Result
2004	Herself (with Cat Power)	Best Solo Artist	Won

== Teen Choice Awards ==
Year	Nominee / work	Award	Result
2001	Herself	Choice Music: R&B/Hip-Hop Artist	Won
2001	"Get Ur Freak On"	Choice Music: R&B/Hip-Hop Track	Won
2001	"Get Ur Freak On"	Choice Music: Dance Track	Nominated
2002	"Oops (Oh My)"	Choice Music: R&B/Hip-Hop Track	Won
2003	Herself	Choice Music: Female Artist	Nominated
2003	Herself	Choice Music: Rap Artist	Won
2003	"Work It"	Choice Music Single	Won
2004	Herself	Choice Music: Rap Artist	Nominated
2004	Herself	Choice Music: Tour	Nominated
2005	Choice TV Personality: Female	Herself	Nominated
2006	Herself	Choice Music: Rap Artist	Won

== TMF ==
=== TMF Belgium Awards ===
Year	Nominee / work	Award	Result
2001	"Lady Marmalade" (with Christina Aguilera, Pink & Mýa)	Video of the Year	Won

=== TMF Netherlands Awards ===
Year	Nominee / work	Award	Result
2001	"Lady Marmalade" (with Christina Aguilera, Pink & Mýa)	Video of the Year	Won

== VH1 Awards ==
Year	Nominee / work	Award	Result
2001	"Lady Marmalade" (with Christina Aguilera, Pink & Mýa)	My VH1 Favorite Video	Won
2001	"Lady Marmalade" (with Christina Aguilera, Pink & Mýa)	My VH1 Music Award for Is It Hot In Here Or Is It Just My Video?	Won
2001	"Lady Marmalade" (with Christina Aguilera, Pink & Mýa)	There's No "I" in Team (Best Collaboration)	Won

=== VH1 Hip Hop Honors Awards ===
Year	Nominee / work	Award	Result
2008	Herself	Hip Hop Honors	Won
2016	Herself	Hip Hop Honors	Won

== VIVA Comet Media Awards ==
Year	Nominee / work	Award	Result
1997	"The Rain (Supa Dupa Fly)"	Best International Video	Won
2001	"Get Ur Freak On"	Best International Video	Won
2001	Herself	International Hip-Hop	Nominated
2003	Herself	International Hip-Hop	Won

== Vibe Awards ==
Year	Nominee / work	Award	Result
2003	"Work It"	Reelist Video	Won
2003	Herself	Artist of the Year	Won
2005	"Lose Control"	Reelist Video	Nominated

== Wild Writings Online Awards ==
Year	Nominee / work	Award	Result
2003	This Is Not a Test!	Album of the Year Hip-Hop/Rap	Won

== Other accolades ==
=== Listicles ===
Publisher	Listicle	Year(s)	Result	Ref.
50/50innertainment	Top 50 Greatest Female Rappers of all time	2022	1st	
