= Work It (Missy Elliott song) =

2002 single by Missy Elliott

Single by Missy Elliott

from the album Under Construction
- B-side: "Pussycat"
- Released: September 16, 2002
- Studio: Hit Factory Criteria (Miami, Florida)
- Length: 4:53 (album version); 4:25 (radio edit); 5:04 (remix)
- Label: Goldmind; Elektra
- Songwriters: Melissa Elliott; Timothy Mosley
- Producers: Timbaland; Missy Elliott

Missy Elliott singles chronology
"Crew Deep" (2002)	"Work It" (2002)	"Honk Your Horn" (2002)

Audio sample
- file; help

Music video
- "Work It" on YouTube

"Work It" is a song by American rapper Missy Elliott. It was written and produced by Elliott and frequent collaborator Tim "Timbaland" Mosley for her fourth studio album Under Construction (2002). The song's musical style, and production by Timbaland, were heavily inspired by old school hip hop from the early 1980s. It samples Run-DMC's "Peter Piper" and Rock Master Scott & the Dynamic Three's "Request Line," while the synth pattern in the rhythm track samples the intro of "Heart of Glass" by Blondie.

The song received widespread acclaim for its inventive production, playful eroticism, and Elliott's commanding presence, with critics ranking it among the best songs of the 2000s and of her career. Released as the album's first single on September 16, 2002, "Work It" became a major international commercial success, peaking at number two on the US Billboard Hot 100 for ten weeks, while also reaching the top ten or top twenty across Europe, Australia, New Zealand, and Canada.

"Work It" earned major awards including a Grammy Award for Best Female Rap Solo Performance, a Billboard Music Award for Top Rap Song, and multiple ASCAP, NAACP, and Teen Choice honors, alongside Brit Award nominations. The Dave Meyers-directed video, featuring breakdancers and tributes to Aaliyah and "Lisa "Left Eye" Lopes, premiered on MTV's Total Request Live and won Video of the Year at the 2003 MTV Video Music Awards, receiving additional nominations for direction and technical categories.

== Background ==
"Work It" was written and produced by Elliott and longtime collaborator Timbaland and recorded at the Hit Factory Criteria in Miami, Florida. According to Timbaland, the song underwent multiple revisions before reaching its final form. Elliott and him recorded at least five versions, experimenting with different lyrics and flows, but none fully satisfied him. The breakthrough came during the last attempt, when Elliott proposed reversing the line "I put my thang down, flip it and reverse it." Upon hearing the reversed vocal, he immediately recognized it as the definitive version of the song. Timbaland challenged Elliott to deliver a strong and distinctive set of lyrics. Uncomfortable recording vocals in front of others, she worked in a separate room and then played her takes back for his evaluation, an experience she compared to presenting a report card. After several attempts, he ultimately approved the performance.

== Composition ==
"Work It" prominently incorporates elements from American old school rap group Rock Master Scott & the Dynamic Three's "Request Line" (1984), particularly the opening vocal scratches and the call-and-response phrase "Is it worth it? Let me work it," which serves as a rhythmic and textural component. In addition, "Work It" utilizes elements from hip-hop group Run-D.M.C.'s song "Peter Piper" (1986), which contribute to the percussive framework and rhythmic drive of the composition. Beyond these primary references, the track also incorporates subtler interpolations from American jazz keyboardist Bob James's instrumental cover of "Take Me to the Mardi Gras" (1975) and American rock band Blondie's 1978 number one hit "Heart of Glass", adding melodic and harmonic layers.

A portion of the song's lyrics helped popularize the slang term badonkadonk among mainstream audiences, describing the movement of the singer’s buttocks and challenging the listener. During the chorus, the lyric "I put my thing down, flip it, and reverse it" is immediately followed by the same line played in reverse, and later in the song, the phrase "Watch the way Missy like to take it backwards" is also reversed. "Work It" additionally employs creative sound effects to convey sexual innuendo. An elephant trumpeting is used in the chorus to obscure a sexual reference, present in both explicit and edited versions. Onomatopoeic expressions such as "ra-ta-ta-ta" and "buboomp buboomp boomp" simulate sexual bodily movements.

== Critical reception ==
NME editor Alex Needham described "Back in the Day" as "marvellously louche" and write: "It transpires that Missy's become more of a celery stick and glass of Evian type of person, the sex in "Work It" presumably to be fitted in between treadmill sessions. Fortunately Missys musical talents haven’t gone the way of her booty. She just seems to have lost some of her… Missyness," while his colleague Victoria Segal called the song an "incredible single," noting its "hilarious squirt of erotic nonsense" on a record full of "shocks and surprises." In review for Under Construction, Slant Magazine's Sal Cinquemani singled out "Work It" as one of the "funky, freaky, and fun" tracks. He felt that the song was picking up stylistically where Elliotty's earlier hit "Get Ur Freak On" left off. John Bush of AllMusic described the song as "turn[ing] the tables on male rappers, taking charge of the sex game, matching their lewdest, rudest rhymes, and also featuring the most notorious backmasked vocal of the year." Bush cited the song as an example of Elliott's "artistic progression, trying to push hip-hop forward [...] neatly emphasizing her differences from other rappers by writing tracks for nearly every facet of the female side of relationships." Drowned in Sound described "Work It" as having a "filthy, irresistible, old-school groove."

Rolling Stone ranked "Work It" 25th in its list "100 Best Songs of the 2000s" and number 56 on its list "Top 500 Greatest Songs of All Time. In 2003, The Village Voice named "Work It" the best single of 2002 on their annual year-end critics' poll Pazz & Jop; "Get Ur Freak On", a previous Elliott single, topped the same poll a year earlier. Stereogum and Paste ranked the song number two and number one, respectively, on their lists of the 10 greatest Missy Elliott Songs. In 2025, the Australian edition ranked of Rolling Stone ranked "Work It" 101st in its list of "The 250 Greatest Songs of the 21st Century So Far," writing: "To push music forward, Missy Elliott had to go backward. The buzzy, burbling "Work It" beat [...] was, even by their standards, so intergalactically freaky that Eliott needed a few tries at writing a song over it before she found the right approach."

== Commercial performance ==
"Work It" debuted on the US Billboard Hot 100 on chart issue dated September 14, 2002, at number 75. In its second and third weeks, it leaped up to number 42 and number 24, respectively, taking the Airplay Gainer title in both weeks. Within five weeks, it reached the top ten, at number 8, and gradually rose from there. On the chart issue dated November 16, 2002, the song reached number 2, but because of the massive success of "Lose Yourself" by Eminem, it never reached number one. Instead, the song stayed at number two for ten weeks, a record that it shares with "Waiting for a Girl Like You" by Foreigner from 1981. Despite never topping the Hot 100 chart, the song topped the Billboard Hot R&B/Hip-Hop Songs chart for five weeks. It has since been certified 3× Platinum by the Recording Industry Association of America (RIAA).

In the United Kingdom, the song peaked at number six on the UK Singles Chart and reached number two on the UK Hip Hop/R&B chart. It was later certified Platinum by the British Phonographic Industry (BPI), denoting sales of 600,000 units. Elsewhere in Europe, "Work It" reached number twelve on the Dutch Single Top 100 and number nineteen on the Dutch Top 40. The song also peaked at number eleven in Denmark, number fifteen in Sweden, and number sixteen in Norway, while reaching number fourteen in Switzerland. In Italy, "Work It" peaked at number 23 on the Italian Singles Chart and later earned a Gold certification from the Federazione Industria Musicale Italiana (FIMI), denoting sales of 35,000 units. The single also reached number nineteen on the Eurochart Hot 100.

In Canada, the song originally reached number 35 on the Canadian Singles Chart in 2003. In 2015, "Work It" re-peaked at number 31 on the chart, more than a decade after its original chart run a result of Elliott's performance at the Super Bowl XLIX halftime show earlier in the month. In Australia, the single reached number six on the ARIA Singles Chart and number five on the Australian Urban chart, becoming Elliott's highest-charting solo single by then, and earned a Gold certification from Australian Recording Industry Association (ARIA) for sales of 35,000 units. In New Zealand, "Work It" peaked at number three on the New Zealand Singles Chart, likewise becoming Elliott's highest-charting solo single in the market at the time, and was later certified 2× Platinum by Recorded Music NZ, representing 60,000 units sold.

== Accolades ==
"Work It" garnered multiple industry recognitions in both awards won and nominations. The song won the Grammy Award for Best Female Rap Solo Performance at the 46th Annual Grammy Awards in 2004, marking Elliott's third consecutive win in the category. It was also nominated in the Best Rap Song category at the same ceremony. At the 2003 Billboard Music Awards, "Work It" won for Hot Rap Track, acknowledging its strong performance on genre-specific charts. In awards presented by the American Society of Composers, Authors and Publishers (ASCAP), "Work It" received recognition at the ASCAP Pop Music Awards as one of the Award-Winning Songs of 2004, and at the ASCAP Rhythm & Soul Music Awards as a Top R&B/Hip-Hop Song and Award Winning Rap Song.

In addition, the song received two nominations at the Brit Awards 2003: Best Female Hip-Hop Artist (as part of Missy Elliott’s overall recognition) and Viewer’s Choice for the song itself. It went on to win Best Rap/Hip-Hop Track at the International Dance Music Awards, as well as Outstanding Song at the NAACP Image Awards. "Work It" also won the Teen Choice Award for Choice Music Single and the 2003 Soul Train Lady of Soul Award for R&B/Soul or Rap Song of the Year.

== Music video ==
Elliott reunited with frequent collaborator, director Dave Meyers to shoot the music video for "Work It." Filmed in Los Angeles, California, The visuals were choreographed by Nadine "Hi‑Hat" Ruffin, and features Alyson Stoner as the lead kid dancer, selected from a pool of 400 to 500 auditioning children. Elliott personally selected the breakdancers from New York and was present at every audition for the other dancers, including Stefan "Mr. Wiggles" Clemente. It includes visual tributes to Elliott's late friends and collaborators Aaliyah and Lisa "Left Eye" Lopes, whose images are airbrushed on the back of her jacket and hood of the car to commemorate their recent deaths. Timbaland, Tweet, and Eve make cameo appearances in the clip.

Meyers and Elliott conceived the video as a space where anything could happen. As with their previous collaborations, Elliott would propose initial ideas, such as setting portions of "Work It" in a beauty salon, after which Meyers expanded on the concepts, developing multiple visual scenarios and presenting a wide range of ideas for consideration. Meyers and his production designer conceived a sequence that uses bees, while brainstorming a shocking opening for the video. The scene was filmed without live honey bees on Elliott's face, using a mannequin head previously created for her video of 2001's "One Minute Man," which was refurbished and composited with separate footage of Elliott in post-production. In a restaurant scene, a glass of wine was mistakenly left in Elliott's hand instead of water, resulting in a take in which she appeared intoxicated and babbling playful nonsense when singer Janet Jackson visited the set. A model was brought from London to the set to appear as a Halle Berry lookalike in the scene.

"Work It" premiered on MTV's countdown show Total Request Live on September 19, 2002, and won Video of the Year at the 2003 MTV Video Music Awards. At the same ceremony, Elliott received additional nominations for Best Female Video, Best Hip-Hop Video, and Best Direction along with Meyers, while art director Charles Infante, editor Chris Davis, cinematograph Michael Bernard, and the staff at Realm Productions were also recognized with nominations in the categories of Best Art Direction, Best Editing, Best Cinematography, Best Special Effects in a Video categories, respectively. In 2015, Stoner reunited with former co-stars to release a tribute dance video for Elliott, responding to public curiosity about their absence from the 2015 Super Bowl performance with Elliott and Katy Perry. In 2018, Billboard ranked the "Work It" video second on their "The 100 Greatest Music Videos of the 21st Century" listing.

== Track listings ==
US 12-inch single

A1. "Work It" (album version)
A2. "Work It" (amended version)
A3. "Work It" (remix dirty featuring 50 Cent)
A4. "Work It" (remix clean featuring 50 Cent)
B1. "Pussycat" (album version)
B2. "Pussycat" (instrumental)
B3. "Work It" (instrumental)

UK CD single

1. "Work It" (album version) – 4:25
2. "Pussycat" (album version) – 3:36
3. "4 My People" (Basement Jaxx remix video) – 2:58

UK 12-inch and cassette single

1. "Work It" (album version) – 4:25
2. "Work It" (instrumental) – 4:25
3. "Pussycat" (album version) – 3:36

European CD single

1. "Work It" (album version) – 4:25
2. "Pussycat" (album version) – 3:36

Australian CD single

1. "Work It" (album version)
2. "Work It" (amended version)
3. "Pussycat" (album version)

== Charts ==
=== Weekly charts ===
2002–2003 weekly chart performance for "Work It"
Chart (2002–2003)	Peak position
Australia (ARIA)	6
Australian Urban (ARIA)	5
Belgium (Ultratop 50 Flanders)	22
Belgium (Ultratip Bubbling Under Wallonia)	2
Canada (Nielsen SoundScan)	35
Canada CHR (Nielsen BDS)	12
Denmark (Tracklisten)	11
Europe (Eurochart Hot 100)	19
France (SNEP)	60
Germany (GfK)	32
Ireland (IRMA)	19
Italy (FIMI)	23
Netherlands (Dutch Top 40)	19
Netherlands (Single Top 100)	12
New Zealand (Recorded Music NZ)	3
Norway (VG-lista)	16
Scottish Singles Sales (Official Charts)	17
Sweden (Sverigetopplistan)	15
Switzerland (Schweizer Hitparade)	14
UK Singles (Official Charts)	6
UK Hip Hop/R&B (Official Charts)	2
US Billboard Hot 100	2
US Hot R&B/Hip-Hop Songs (Billboard)	1
US Hot Rap Songs (Billboard)	1
US Pop Airplay (Billboard)	3
US Rhythmic Airplay (Billboard)	1

2015 weekly chart performance for "Work It"
Chart (2015)	Peak position
Canada (Nielsen SoundScan)	31

=== Year-end charts ===
2002 year-end chart performance for "Work It"
Chart (2002)	Position
Canada (Nielsen SoundScan)	193
UK Singles (OCC)	157
UK Urban (Music Week)	5
US Billboard Hot 100	54
US Hot R&B/Hip-Hop Singles & Tracks (Billboard)	41
US Hot Rap Tracks (Billboard)	17
US Rhythmic Top 40 (Billboard)	30

2003 year-end chart performance for "Work It"
Chart (2003)	Position
Australia (ARIA)	36
US Billboard Hot 100	36
US Hot R&B/Hip-Hop Singles & Tracks (Billboard)	37
US Hot Rap Tracks (Billboard)	20
US Mainstream Top 40 (Billboard)	42
US Rhythmic Top 40 (Billboard)	40

=== Decade-end charts ===
Decade-end chart performance for "Work It"
Chart (2000–2009)	Position
US Billboard Hot 100	96

== Certifications ==
Certifications for "Work It"
Region	Certification	Certified units/sales
Australia (ARIA)	Gold	35,000^{^}
Italy (FIMI)	Gold	35,000^{‡}
New Zealand (RMNZ)	2× Platinum	60,000^{‡}
United Kingdom (BPI)	Platinum	600,000^{‡}
United States (RIAA)	3× Platinum	3,000,000^{‡}
^{^} Shipments figures based on certification alone.^{‡} Sales+streaming figures based on certification alone.

== Release history ==
Release dates and formats for "Work It"
Region	Date	Format(s)	Label(s)	Ref.
United States	September 16, 2002	Rhythmic contemporary; urban radio	Goldmind; Elektra	
United States	September 30, 2002	Contemporary hit radio	Goldmind; Elektra	
Australia	November 4, 2002	CD	Goldmind; Elektra	
United Kingdom	November 4, 2002	12-inch vinyl; CD; cassette	Goldmind; Elektra	
New Zealand	December 16, 2002	CD	Goldmind; Elektra	

== Samples and cover versions ==
- In February 2023, DJ and record producer Skrillex released the album Quest for Fire, which includes the song "Ratata". The song heavily samples "Work It", with Elliott delivering new vocals.
- On March 23, 2023, British group Flo released the single "Fly Girl", featuring Elliott; the song samples and interpolates "Work It" plus a new rap section from Elliott.

== Bibliography ==
- Keazor, Henry; Thorsten Wuebbena: Video Thrills The Radio Star. Musikvideos: Geschichte, Themen, Analysen. 3rd. edition, Bielefeld 2011; ISBN 3899427289, pp. 83–113
- Michael Rappe, Under Construction. 2 Vols., Cologne 2011
