= Take Away (song) =

Single by Missy Elliott featuring Ginuwine and Tweet

from the album Miss E... So Addictive
- Released: October 18, 2001
- Studio: Westlake Recording Studios (Los Angeles, California)
- Genre: R&B
- Length: 4:58 (album version)
- Label: Goldmind; Elektra
- Songwriters: Melissa Elliott; Timothy Mosley
- Producers: Missy Elliott; Timbaland; Craig Brockman

Missy Elliott singles chronology
"One Minute Man" (2001)	"Take Away" (2001)	"Son of a Gun (I Betcha Think This Song Is About You)" (2001)

Ginuwine singles chronology
"Just Because" (2001)	"Take Away" (2001)	"Tribute to a Woman" (2002)

Tweet singles chronology
"Take Away" (2001)	"All Y'all" (2001)

Music video
- "Take Away" on YouTube

"Take Away" is a song by American rapper Missy Elliott. It was written by Elliott and Timbaland for her third studio album, Miss E... So Addictive (2001), while production was helmed by the latter, with Elliott and Craig Brockman served as co-producers. The downtempo track features guest vocals from R&B singer Ginuwine. While the album version of "Take Away" credits background vocals by 702 member, Kameelah Williams, the single version replaces Williams's vocals with then-newcomer, Elliott's former protégée Tweet.

Released as the album's third single, it reached the top 20 on the US Hot R&B/Hip-Hop Songs chart but was less successful than Elliott's previous singles "Get Your Freak On" and "One Minute Man." The accompanying music video was dedicated to Elliott's close friend Aaliyah, who was killed in a plane crash in August 2001. The remainder of the music video features a snippet of Elliott's single, "4 My People", which served as an aptly–upbeat dedication to the victims of the 9/11 attacks and citizens of the United States.

== Critical reception ==
Rolling Stone felt that the song was "awesome." Pitchfork found that "Take Away" attempts "to update early Prince ballads, and instead reveals how those slow R&B jams depended on The Artist's histrionics to carry the song. And despite having already proven herself more than capable of similar theatricalities, she relies on played-out vocoder, and irrationally allows Ginuwine to dumb things down with "sensitive" crooning." Stephen Dalton from NME called "Take Away" the "dullest cut off Miss E… So Addictive, a sugary R&B ballad with no subversive sexual sermons, no chop-socky speedbeats, no dazzling verbal somersaults – just a straight declaration of love which transcends mere earthly riches. With Ginuwine and newcomer Charlene "Tweet" Keys shouldering the bulk of the vocals, Missy the hyperkinetic maverick is cooking on a low heat here." Exclaim! critic Cam Lindsay found that the song "disappoints, with Ginuwine taking over the spotlight, and is a throwaway slow jam that seems to steer away from Missy's talents."

== Chart performance ==
"Take Away" was released via radio airplay as the third single from Miss E... So Addictive on October 18, 2001, and began charting as an album cut. Soon as it picked up heavier airplay and debuted on the US Billboard Hot R&B/Hip-Hop Singles & Tracks at number 84, the song was physically released in the United States on November 5, 2001, and in international regions on January 29, 2002.

== Music video ==
Directed by Dave Meyers, the video begins with a message from Missy Elliott:

I dedicate this to Aaliyah who brought life to my music...

Elliott is then shown singing her verses in a Fantasy Kingdom–themed palace; decorated with angelic statues and flowers. Tweet is then spotted singing the chorus with Elliott while holding an umbrella under showering flower petals. The following scene then shows Ginuwine singing his verses in two differing locations—one being a rocky cave; and the other being steps of the palace. During his verses, Ginuwine along with Elliott glance at the sight of waterfalls where pictures of Aaliyah are reflecting from the water. Tweet is then shown singing the chorus with Elliott, while playing the harp as people dressed in white begin to dance. The video then transitions to Elliott performing "4 My People" with an American crowd in an upbeat dedication to the 9/11 victims.

The video then ends with a message from Elliott:

There will never be a day that you will be forgotten, my guardian angel, Aaliyah. I love you.

— Missy

== Cover versions ==
On September 29, 2014, the album version of the song was sampled by Elliott's protégée Sharaya J for her single, "Takin' It No More".

== Track listings ==
European 12" vinyl
No.	Title	Writer(s)	Producer(s)	Length
1.	"Take Away" (album version) (featuring Ginuwine & Tweet)	Melissa Elliott; Timothy Mosley	Timbaland; Craig Brockman^{[a]}; Missy Elliott^{[a]}	4:58
2.	"Take Away" (radio edit) (featuring Ginuwine & Tweet)	Elliott; Mosley	Timbaland; Brockman^{[a]}; Elliott^{[a]}	3:41
3.	"One Minute Man" (original version) (featuring Ludacris & Trina)	Elliott; Mosley; Christopher Bridges	Timbaland; Big Tank^{[a]}; Elliott^{[a]}	4:25
4.	"Get Ur Freak On" (Superchumbo's Superfreakon remix)	Elliott; Mosley	Timbaland; Elliott^{[a]}; Tom Stephan^{[b]}	8:53

European CD/Maxi-single
No.	Title	Writer(s)	Producer(s)	Length
1.	"Take Away" (radio edit) (featuring Ginuwine & Tweet)	Elliott; Mosley	Timbaland; Brockman^{[a]}; Elliott^{[a]}	3:41
2.	"Take Away" (album version) (featuring Ginuwine & Tweet)	Elliott; Mosley	Timbaland; Brockman^{[a]}; Elliott^{[a]}	4:58
3.	"One Minute Man" (original version) (featuring Ludacris & Trina)	Elliott; Mosley; Bridges	Timbaland; Big Tank^{[a]}; Elliott^{[a]}	4:25
4.	"Get Ur Freak On" (Superchumbo's Superfreakon remix)	Elliott; Mosley	Timbaland; Elliott^{[a]}; Stephan^{[b]}	8:53
5.	"Get Ur Freak On" (Music video)			3:55

US CD single
No.	Title	Writer(s)	Producer(s)	Length
1.	"Take Away" (radio edit) (featuring Ginuwine & Tweet)	Elliott; Mosley	Timbaland; Brockman^{[a]}; Elliott^{[a]}	3:43
2.	"Take Away" (instrumental)	Elliott; Mosley	Timbaland; Brockman^{[a]}; Elliott^{[a]}	4:59
3.	"Take Away" (TV Track)	Elliott; Mosley	Timbaland; Brockman^{[a]}; Elliott^{[a]}	5:00
4.	"Take Away" (acappella) (featuring Ginuwine & Tweet)	Elliott; Mosley	Timbaland; Brockman^{[a]}; Elliott^{[a]}	3:48

Notes

- ^{^[a]} signifies a co-producer
- ^{^[b]} signifies a remix producer

== Credits and personnel ==
- Craig Brockman – co-producer
- Jimmy Douglass – engineer, mixing
- Missy Elliott – co-producer, vocals, writer
- Ginuwine – vocals
- Jesse Gorman – assistant engineer
- Bernie Grundman – mastering
- Steve Penny – assistant engineer
- Grayson Sumby – assistant engineer
- Timbaland – mixing, producer, writer
- Tweet – vocals
- Melah Williams – ad libs

== Charts ==
Weekly chart performance for "Take Away"
Chart (2001–2002)	Peak position
Belgium (Ultratip Bubbling Under Flanders)	9
Belgium (Ultratip Bubbling Under Wallonia)	14
Germany (GfK)	96
Netherlands (Dutch Top 40 Tipparade)	11
US Billboard Hot 100	45
US Hot R&B/Hip-Hop Songs (Billboard)	13
US Rhythmic Airplay (Billboard)	29

== Release history ==
Release history for "Take Away"
Region	Date	Format(s)	Label	Ref.
United States	October 18, 2001	Airplay	Atlantic; Goldmind	
United States	November 5, 2001	CD single	Atlantic; Goldmind	
United Kingdom	January 29, 2002	CD single	Atlantic; Goldmind	
