= Grammy Award for Best Female Rap Solo Performance =

Defunct music award

- Awarded for: Quality female rap performances
- Country: United States
- Presented by: National Academy of Recording Arts and Sciences
- First award: 2003
- Final award: 2004
- Website: grammy.com

The Grammy Award for Best Female Rap Solo Performance was an honor presented to female recording artists at the 45th Grammy Awards in 2003 and the 46th Grammy Awards in 2004 for quality rap solo performances. The Grammy Awards, an annual ceremony that was established in 1958 and originally called the Gramophone Awards, are presented by the National Academy of Recording Arts and Sciences of the United States to "honor artistic achievement, technical proficiency and overall excellence in the recording industry, without regard to album sales or chart position".

In 1991, the academy began to honor individual rap performances with the Best Rap Solo Performance category. In 2003, the category was split into two to recognize Female and Male Rap Solo Performances. The categories remained separated by gender until 2005 when they were combined into the genderless category originally called Best Rap Solo Performance. American artist Missy Elliott won the award for Best Female Rap Solo Performance both years it was presented.

== Background ==
In 1991, the academy began to honor individual rap performances with the Grammy Award for Best Rap Solo Performance category. The category name remained unchanged until 2004 when it was split into separate categories for Female and Male Rap Solo Performance. The categories remained separated by gender for one additional year. In 2005, they were merged into the genderless category originally known as Best Rap Solo Performance. Female rapper MC Lyte has campaigned for the reinstatement of the female-specific category and believes that: "it destroys [hip-hop] culture to not have the perspective of a woman". Bill Freimuth, Recording Academy Vice President of Awards, claimed that the category was eliminated because "[there] wasn't enough competition essentially, due to the lack of the number of releases in that category". Black Entertainment Television (BET) executive Stephen Hill cited a similar reason for the elimination of the female categories by the BET Hip Hop Awards and VH1's Hip Hop Honors, reflecting a lack of female representation in the hip hop music scene for several years. As of 2011, the category name has not changed since 2005.

== Recipients ==
Year	Winner(s)	Title	Nominees	Ref.
2003	Missy Elliott	"Scream a.k.a. Itchin'"	Charli Baltimore for "Diary..."; Eve for "Satisfaction"; Foxy Brown for "Na Na Be Like"; Lauryn Hill for "Mystery of Iniquity"	
2004	Missy Elliott	"Work It"	Da Brat for "Got It Poppin'"; Lil' Kim for "Came Back For You"; MC Lyte for "Ride Wit Me"; Queen Latifah for "Go Head"	

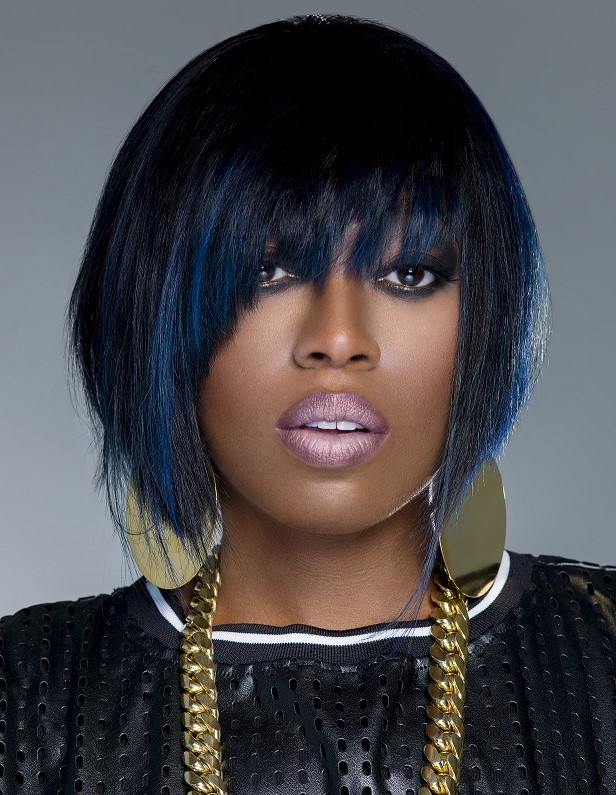
Two-time award winner Missy Elliott

For the 45th Grammy Awards (2003), Best Female Rap Solo Performance nominees included: Charli Baltimore for "Diary...", Missy Elliott for "Scream a.k.a. Itchin'", Eve for "Satisfaction", Foxy Brown for "Na Na Be Like", and Lauryn Hill for "Mystery of Iniquity". Baltimore was shocked when she learned of her album's nomination because she thought that it did not meet eligibility requirements. Elliott was also nominated for Best Short Form Music Video, along with Knoc-turn'al and Dr. Dre, for "Knoc". The award was presented to Elliott at Madison Square Garden in New York City, though not broadcast on television.

Nominees for the 46th Grammy Awards included: Da Brat for "Got It Poppin'", Elliott for "Work It", Lil' Kim for "Came Back for You", MC Lyte for "Ride Wit Me", and Queen Latifah for "Go Head". In addition, Elliott was nominated for: Album of the Year and Best Rap Album for Under Construction, Best Song Rap for "Work It", and Best Rap Performance by a Duo or Group for "Gossip Folks" (featuring Ludacris), for a total five nominations. Lil' Kim was also nominated for Best Pop Collaboration with Vocals for "Can't Hold Us Down" (with Christina Aguilera) and Best Rap Performance by a Duo or Group for "Magic Stick" (featuring 50 Cent). The award was presented to Elliott for "Work It", whose music video was awarded Video of the Year and Best Hip-Hop Video at the 2003 MTV Video Music Awards.

Elliott won the award for Best Female Rap Solo Performance both years it was presented. Prior to the female and male categories, she received the award for Best Rap Solo Performance in 2002 for "Get Ur Freak On". This marked the second time a female had received the award for Best Rap Solo Performance (Queen Latifah was presented the honor for "U.N.I.T.Y." at the 37th Grammy Awards in 1995). In 2007, following the return to the genderless category, Elliot was nominated for the song "We Run This".

== See also ==
- Grammy Award for Best Rap Performance
- Grammy Award for Best Rap Song
- History of hip hop music
- List of awards and nominations received by Missy Elliott
- List of music awards honoring women
- Misogyny in hip hop culture
