= Pussycat (Wyclef Jean song) =

Single by Wyclef Jean featuring Tom Jones

from the album Masquerade
- B-side: "Two Wrongs (So So Def Remix)"
- Released: November 18, 2002
- Recorded: 2002
- Length: 3:49
- Label: Columbia
- Songwriters: Jerry 'Wonder' Duplessis; Wyclef Jean
- Producers: Jerry 'Wonder' Duplessis, Wyclef Jean

Wyclef Jean singles chronology
"Two Wrongs" (2001)	"Pussycat" (2002)	"Party to Damascus" (2003)

Tom Jones singles chronology
"Sex Bomb" (2000)	"Pussycat" (200)	"Tom Jones International" (2002)

"Pussycat" is the second single from Wyclef Jean's third studio album, Masquerade. The song features a sample of "What's New Pussycat?" by Tom Jones.

== Track listing ==
German CD1

1. "Pussycat" (Album Version) (featuring Tom Jones)
2. "Pussycat" (Street Remix - Clean) (featuring Loon, Busta Rhymes And Robby & Ryan Of City High)

German CD2

1. "Pussycat" (Album Version) (featuring Tom Jones)
2. "Pussycat" (Street Remix - Clean) (featuring Loon, Busta Rhymes And Robby & Ryan Of City High)
3. "Pussycat" (Blackkat Remix)
4. "Two Wrongs" (So So Def Remix) (featuring Claudette Ortiz Of City High)
5. "Pussycat" (Video)

== Charts ==
Chart (2002)	Peak position
Australia (ARIA)	58
Australian Urban (ARIA)	16

== Release history ==
Region	Version(s)	Date	Format(s)	Label(s)	Ref.
United States	Remix	November 11, 2002	Rhythmic contemporary · urban contemporary radio	Columbia	
