= Back in the Day (Missy Elliott song) =

Promotional single by Missy Elliott featuring Jay-Z

from the album Under Construction
- Released: February 8, 2003
- Studio: The Hit Factory Criteria (Miami, Florida); Baseline Recording Studios (New York City)
- Length: 4:02
- Label: Goldmind
- Songwriters: Melissa Elliott; Shawn Carter; Timothy Mosley
- Producers: Missy Elliott; Timbaland

"Back in the Day" is a song by American rapper Missy Elliott, featuring guest vocals from Jay-Z. It was written by Elliott, Jay-Z and Timbaland for her fourth studio album Under Construction (2002), while production was helmed by the latter, with co-production from Elliott. At one time planned for release as a single, the song peaked at number 86 on Billboard's US Hot R&B/Hip-Hop Songs chart in May 2003 before being scrapped as a single.

== Background ==
Produced by Elliott's main producer and longtime collaborator Timbaland, "Back in the Day" is an ode to the classic era of old school hip-hop, when the hip-hop culture was, Elliott sings, fun and peaceful, compared to the more violent scope of modern-day hip-hop. "Back in the day/hip-hop has changed", she sings. During the bridge of the song she even makes a point of referencing "Self-Destruction", a 1989 collaborative benefit single for peace featuring a number of that era's hip-hop stars. Incidentally, MC Lyte's verse from "Self-Destruction" is sampled on another of Under Construction's album tracks, "Funky Fresh Dressed".

Jay-Z contributes a rap verse in which he "creatively" references a number of hip-hop artists (for example, stating "I kill at will like solid water, dude", a reference to Ice Cube's 1990 EP Kill At Will. At one point during his verse, Jay-Z raps "so fuck Chuck Philips and Bill O'Reilly/if they try to stop hip-hop, we all gon' rally", a reference to two of hip-hop's most vocal critics.

== Critical reception ==
Pitchfork found "although the song reeks of both a Confucian historical reworking and old-skool hip-hop dilettantism, Jay delivers a smoothly masterful verse that name-checks personal heroes Showbiz and A.G. and calls out the narrow-minded moralizing of political pundits Bill O'Reilly and Chuck Phillips [...] Missy's delivery ain't bad, either. I mean, it's not like she's composing anything traditionally deep or revelatory, but the ease with which she navigates the Timbaland's musical landmines is stunning – these two were made for each other." Caroline Sullivan from The Guardian felt that "Elliott is having fun here, playfully putting Jay-Z in his place on the sunny "Back in the Day"." British online newspaper The Independent singled out "Back in the Day" as the "key track" that hinges on hip-hop nostalgia and commentary about "gold chains, fat laces and old-skool" vibes. NME editor Victoria Segal mentioned "Back in the Day" as the "only low point" on its parent album due to its standard hip-hop nostalgia, even though she praised Elliott overall performance.

== Commercial performance ==
"Back in the Day" peaked at number 86 on the US Hot R&B/Hip-Hop Songs chart in the weeks of May 10, 2003.

== "Back in the Day" references ==
Below is a list of people and items Elliott and Jay-Z namedrop in "Back in the Day":

Hip hop fashion

- British Knights
- Gold chains
- Fat laces

Dances

- Prep
- Cabbage Patch

Hip hop artists

- Salt-N-Pepa
- Rakim
- Run-DMC
- Big Daddy Kane
- Heavy D
- Slick Rick
- MC Lyte
- Raekwon
- Ghostface Killah
- Showbiz and A.G.
- Dr. Dre
- LL Cool J
- Public Enemy
- M.O.P.
- Tag Team
- Ice Cube
- The Notorious B.I.G.
- 2Pac
- KRS-One
- EPMD

== Personnel ==
Credits lifted from the liner notes of Under Construction.

- Carlos "El Loco" Bedoya – recording engineer
- Demacio "Demo" Castellón – assistant engineer
- Jimmy Douglass – mixing and recording engineer
- Missy Elliott – co-producer, vocalist, writer
- Jay-Z – vocalist, writer
- Gimel "Guru" Keaton – recording engineer
- Marc Lee – assistant engineer
- Timbaland – mixing, producer
- Tweet – background vocalist
- Ben "Steamy" Williams – mixing assistant

== Charts ==
Chart performance for "Back in the Day"
| Chart (2003) | Peak position |
|---|---|
| US Hot R&B/Hip-Hop Songs (Billboard) | 86 |
