= The Preacher's Son =

Studio album by Wyclef Jean
- Released: November 4, 2003
- Length: 65:09
- Label: J
- Producers: Jerry "Wonda" Duplessis; Wyclef Jean; Lester Mendez; Malik Pendleton; Sedeck; T-Vice; Shea Taylor; Teflon

Wyclef Jean chronology
Greatest Hits (2003)	The Preacher's Son (2003)	Welcome to Haiti: Creole 101 (2004)

Singles from The Preacher's Son
- 1. "Party to Damascus" Released: September 30, 2003; 2. "Industry" Released: November 17, 2003; 3. "Take Me as I Am" Released: March 18, 2004

The Preacher's Son is the fourth studio album by Haitian rapper Wyclef Jean, released on November 4, 2003. The album, which was co-produced by Jean and long-time collaborator Jerry 'Wonda' Duplessis, combines elements of hip hop, reggae and reggae fusion. It uses a number of samples, including the Motown-inspired "Industry", which samples "What Becomes of the Brokenhearted". The album contains guest appearances by Missy Elliott, Patti LaBelle, Rah Digga and Redman, as well as a guitar feature by Carlos Santana on the song "Three Nights in Rio".

Three singles were released from the album. The lead single, "Party to Damascus", was the only single served to international radio and reached the top 30 of the UK Singles Chart. "Industry" served as a European-only single, with some territories, including Germany, releasing it as a double A-side with "Party to Damascus". "Take Me as I Am" was released as a US radio single in March 2004, with a new "Urban Remix" being serviced to certain radio stations.

== Critical reception ==
Professional ratings
Review scores
Source	Rating
AllMusic	4/5 stars
Blender	3/5 stars
The Guardian	2/5 stars
The Independent	4/5 stars
MTV Asia	8/10
New York Post	3/4 stars
Now	2/5 Ns
RapReviews	8/10
Rolling Stone	2/5 stars

AllMusic editor Rob Theakston felt that the album "finds Wyclef re-energized right from the opening moments [...] Preacher's Son doesn't let up there either thanks to an armada of guest cameos from Patti LaBelle, Redman, Carlos Santana, Scarface, and Monica, just to name a few. And unlike most rap albums, which rely on these guest appearances to carry the weight of the record's impact, these contributions only complement the stellar songwriting, arrangements, and production style that has made Wyclef one of the most in-demand producers of the 2000s and '90s. As with most records, there's a bit of filler that could be trimmed to make a great record into a phenomenal one, but it's easy to forgive when the quality is so high. The Preacher's Son is a welcome return to form and easily one of the biggest highlights of Wyclef's career." Dan Leroy from Yahoo! LAUNCH found that The Preacher's Son "reveals a somewhat simpler and humbler 'Clef, one who's as often satisfied to be a love chiropractor instead of the world-changing reincarnation of Bob Marley, and who even dreams about a Fugees reunion. And that helps make his usual crooning forays into reggae and soul – sweeter and more frequent here than normally – Jean's most satisfying post-Fugees music yet."

Dan Aquilante of the New York Post praised The Preacher's Son for its fusion of hip-hop with reggae, samba and smooth R&B, highlighting its message of peace and understanding and Patti LaBelle's "outstanding" guest appearance on "Celebrate." Dorian Lynskey from The Guardian found that "though The Preacher's Son opens with a flourish [...] it fizzles out with embarrassing speed. Vainly stuffing in high-powered guests like battery hens, Wyclef wobbles between humdrum Marleyisms and novelty codswallop like "Party By the Sea," which suggests Black Lace trapped in a 1980s Lilt advert." Matt Galloway, writing for Now, felt that the album "might be the first example of adult contemporary, easy listening hiphop. So watered down is his music, with novelty salsa and dancehall bits tossed into the mix for laughs, that Clef remains one of the few musicians who could make Redman and Elephant Man guest raps boring." The A.V. Club's Nathan Rabin noted that The Preacher's Son "is a hip-hop album for people who don't much like rap. With its corny story-songs, sugary ballads, superficial social consciousness, prominent guitar parts, and guest appearances [...], it's an album more likely to appeal to the C. Delores Tuckers of the world than to kids weaned on 2Pac, Eminem, and 50 Cent. Jean's ambition and eclecticism are admirable as ever, but the further he strays from his hip-hop roots, the less vital he seems."

== Commercial performance ==
The Preacher's Son debuted and peaked at number 22 on the US Billboard 200 and number five on the US Top R&B/Hip-Hop Albums chart.

== Track listing ==
The Preacher's Son – Standard edition
No.	Title	Writer(s)	Producer(s)	Length
1.	"Intro"	Wyclef Jean; Jerry Duplessis	Duplessis	0:29
2.	"Industry"	Jean; Duplessis; James Dean; Paul Riser; William Witherspoon	Duplessis	3:03
3.	"Party to Damascus" (featuring Missy Elliott)	Jean; Duplessis; Melissa Elliott	Duplessis	4:03
4.	"Celebrate" (featuring Cassidy and Patti LaBelle)	Jean; Duplessis; Barry Reese; Bobby Rush; Farel Jean; James Vanleer; Patti LaBelle	Sedeck; Duplessis	4:19
5.	"Baby Daddy" (featuring Redman)	Jean; Duplessis; Reggie Noble	Duplessis	4:01
6.	"Three Nights In Rio" (featuring Carlos Santana)	Jean; Duplessis	Lester Mendez; Duplessis	4:03
7.	"Class Reunion" (featuring Monica)	Jean; Duplessis; Devon Garnett; LaTabia Parker	Duplessis	3:52
8.	"Baby"	Jean; Duplessis; Sheldon Harris	Telfon; Duplessis	4:08
9.	"I Am Your Doctor" (featuring Wayne Wonder and Elephant Man)	Jean; Duplessis; Harris; Oneal Bryan; Charles Von Wayne	Duplessis	4:09
10.	"Linda" (featuring Carl Restivo)	Jean; Duplessis; Carl Restivo	Duplessis	4:11
11.	"Take Me As I Am" (featuring Sharissa)	Jean; Duplessis; Sharissa Dawes	Duplessis	4:18
12.	"Grateful"	Jean; Duplessis; Malik Pendleton	Pendleton; Duplessis	3:38
13.	"Next Generation" (featuring Rah Digga and Scarface)	Jean; Duplessis; Brad Jordan; Rashia Fisher; Shea Taylor	Taylor; Duplessis	4:40
14.	"Rebel Music" (featuring Prodigy)	Jean; Duplessis; A.R. Rahman; Albert Johnson; Anand Bakshi	Duplessis	3:57
15.	"Who Gave the Order" (featuring Buju Banton)	Jean; Duplessis; Mark Myrie	Duplessis	4:23
16.	"Party By the Sea" (featuring Buju Banton and T-Vice)	Jean; Duplessis; Myrie; Reynoldo Martinez; Roberto Martinez	T-Vice; Duplessis	3:52
17.	"Party to Damascus (Remix)" (featuring Missy Elliott)	Jean; Duplessis; Elliott	Duplessis	4:03

The Preacher's Son – Limited edition
No.	Title	Writer(s)	Producer(s)	Length
18.	"I Am Your Doctor" (Live in Studio Session)	Jean; Duplessis; Harris; Bryan; Wayne	Duplessis
19.	"Industry" (Marley Marl Remix)	Jean; Duplessis; Dean; Riser; Witherspoon	Duplessis

The Preacher's Son – Deluxe edition bonus DVD
No.	Title	Length
1.	"Next Generation" (Live Vibe Session)
2.	"I Am Your Doctor" (Live Vibe Session)
3.	"Class Reunion" (Live Vibe Session)
4.	"Three Nights in Rio" (Live Vibe Session)
5.	"Baby Daddy" (Live Vibe Session)
6.	"Shottas" (Live Vibe Session)

== Charts ==
Chart performance for The Preacher's Son
Chart (2003–04)	Peak position
Austrian Albums (Ö3 Austria)	60
Canadian Albums (Nielsen SoundScan)	54
Canadian R&B Albums (Nielsen SoundScan)	12
French Albums (SNEP)	117
German Albums (Offizielle Top 100)	59
Norwegian Albums (VG-lista)	20
Swiss Albums (Schweizer Hitparade)	36
US Billboard 200	22
US Top R&B/Hip-Hop Albums (Billboard)	5
