= Miss E... So Addictive =

Studio album by Missy Elliott
- Released: May 15, 2001
- Genres: Hip hop; dance; R&B
- Length: 57:07
- Labels: Goldmind; Violator; Elektra
- Producers: Timbaland; Missy Elliott; Craig Brockman; Nisan; D-Man; Big Tank

Missy Elliott chronology
Da Real World (1999)	Miss E... So Addictive (2001)	Under Construction (2002)

Singles from Miss E… So Addictive
- 1. "Get Ur Freak On" Released: March 13, 2001; 2. "Lick Shots" Released: May 1, 2001; 3. "One Minute Man" Released: June 22, 2001; 4. "Take Away" Released: November 5, 2001; 5. "4 My People" Released: March 25, 2002

Miss E... So Addictive is the third studio album by American rapper Missy Elliott. It was released by The Goldmind Inc. and Elektra Records on May 15, 2001, in the United States. The album spawned the club and R&B/hip-hop hits "One Minute Man", featuring Ludacris and Trina, and "Get Ur Freak On", as well as the international club hit "4 My People" and the less commercially successful single "Take Away".

The album debuted at number two on the US Billboard 200 chart, selling 250,000 copies in its first week. The album was certified platinum by the Recording Industry Association of America (RIAA). The album garnered two Grammy Awards for "Get Ur Freak On" and the non-single "Scream a.k.a. Itchin'" for Best Rap Solo Performance and Best Female Rap Solo Performance respectively.

== Critical reception ==
Professional ratings
Aggregate scores
Source	Rating
Metacritic	89/100
Review scores
Source	Rating
AllMusic	4.5/5 stars
Blender	4/5 stars
Entertainment Weekly	B+
The Guardian	5/5 stars
Los Angeles Times	3.5/4 stars
NME	8/10
Pitchfork	8.2/10
Q	4/5 stars
Rolling Stone	4/5 stars
Spin	8/10

Miss E... So Addictive received widespread acclaim from music critics. On Metacritic, the album holds a score of 89 out of 100 based on 16 reviews, indicating "universal acclaim". John Bush from AllMusic felt that Elliott was "sounding more assured of her various strengths than at any time since her startling debut" and called "her best album so far." He wrote that it's "a tribute to her incredible songwriting skills and Timbaland's continuing production excellence that she can have it any way she wants it and still come away with a full-length that hangs together brilliantly." Rolling Stone found that Miss E... So Addictive "proclaims unto all the world that Missy (the singer-rapper-songwriter), along with Tim (the producer), is back on top, making the most sonically inventive, rhythmically explosive pop music around. La freak, c'est chic."

The Guardian critic Alexis Petridis found that the album "certainly sounds a little disorientated and spacey" and it "an intriguing album. Packed with unique ideas and brilliantly realised, Miss E... So Addictive is further evidence of Elliott's refusal to play male rappers at their own game and her desire to change the rules entirely. It's an album that sets its own agenda and sounds like nothing else in hip-hop: an incomparable achievement." David Browne from Entertainment Weekly noted that "Elliott spends too much time dissing detractors, but the hooks come as fast as the reefer references, and for the first time since her debut, she sounds as if she's having a blast singing, rhyming, growling, hissing, and purring." The New Yorker called Miss E... So Addictive a "foot-tapping, hip-shaking ride from start to finish. Elliott's long-term producer Timbaland refuses to pad the album with filler, instead making every song count, from the driving hip-hop numbers to the languorous ballads."

=== Year-end lists ===
Year-end lists for Miss E... So Addictive
Publication	Accolade	Rank	Ref.
The Guardian	The 100 Best Albums of the 21st Century	96	
HipHopDX	HHDX's Top 20 Albums of 2001	—N/a	
NME	Best Albums and Tracks of 2001	26	
Now	Top 10 Decade-Defining Discs	9	
Pitchfork	The 200 Best Albums of the 2000s	77	
Q	Best 50 Albums of 2001	—N/a	
Rolling Stone	200 Greatest Hip-Hop Albums of All Time	7	
Slant	Top 10 Albums of 2001	9	
Slant	The 100 Best Albums of the 2000s	43	
Village Voice	The 2001 Pazz & Jop Critics Poll	24	

== Commercial performance ==
Miss E... So Addictive debuted at number two on the US Billboard 200 chart, selling 250,000 copies in its first week. This became Elliott's third US top ten debut. The album ended up spending a total of 43 weeks on the chart. On July 18, 2001, the album was certified platinum by the Recording Industry Association of America (RIAA) for sales of over a million copies in the United States. As of November 2015, the album has sold 1,767,000 copies in the US.

== Track listing ==
Miss E... So Addictive track listing
No.	Title	Writer(s)	Producer(s)	Length
1.	"...So Addictive" (Intro) (featuring Charlene "Tweet" Keys)	Melissa Elliott; Craig Brockman	Craig Brockman; Missy "Misdemeanor" Elliott	0:54
2.	"Dog in Heat" (featuring Method Man & Redman)	Elliott; Timothy Mosley; Reggie Noble; Clifford Smith	Timbaland; Elliott^{[a]}	5:01
3.	"One Minute Man" (featuring Ludacris)	Elliott; Mosley; Christopher Bridges	Timbaland; Big Tank^{[a]}; Elliott^{[a]}	4:35
4.	"Lick Shots"	Elliott; Mosley	Timbaland; Elliott^{[a]}	3:53
5.	"Get Ur Freak On"	Elliott; Mosley	Timbaland; Elliott^{[a]}	3:56
6.	"Scream a.k.a. Itchin'" (featuring Timbaland)	Elliott; Mosley	Timbaland; Elliott^{[a]}	3:57
7.	"Old School Joint"	Elliott; Mosley	Timbaland; Elliott^{[a]}	4:00
8.	"Take Away" (featuring Ginuwine)	Elliott; Mosley	Timbaland; Brockman^{[a]}; Elliott^{[a]}	4:58
9.	"4 My People" (featuring Eve)	Elliott; Mosley; Brockman; Nisan Stewart; Dante Nolan; Eve Jeffers	Nisan; D-Man; Elliott^{[a]}; Timbaland^{[b]}	4:50
10.	"Bus-a-Bus" (Interlude; performed by Busta Rhymes)	Trevor Smith; Mosley	Timbaland; Elliott^{[a]}	1:10
11.	"Whatcha Gon' Do" (featuring Timbaland)	Elliott; Mosley	Timbaland; Elliott^{[a]}	3:14
12.	"Step Off"	Elliott; Mosley	Timbaland; Elliott^{[a]}	3:58
13.	"X-Tasy"	Elliott; Mosley; Charlene Keys	Timbaland; Elliott^{[a]}	3:35
14.	"Slap! Slap! Slap!" (featuring Da Brat & Jade)	Elliott; Mosley; Shawntae Harris; Chevon Young	Timbaland; Elliott^{[a]}	4:05
15.	"I've Changed" (Interlude) (featuring Lil Mo)	Elliott; Mosley	Timbaland; Elliott^{[a]}	1:05
16.	"One Minute Man" (Remix) (featuring Jay-Z)	Elliott; Mosley; Shawn Carter	Timbaland; Big Tank^{[a]}; Elliott^{[a]}	4:35

Hidden bonus tracks (tracks 17 through 28 are blank)
No.	Title	Writer(s)	Producer(s)	Length
29.	"Higher Ground (Prelude)"	Elliott; Mosley; Kim Burrell	Timbaland; Elliott^{[a]}	1:46
30.	"Higher Ground" (featuring Karen Clark Sheard, Yolanda Adams, Kim Burrell, Dorinda Clark Cole, Mary Mary & Tweet)	Elliott; Mosley; Burrell	Timbaland; Elliott^{[a]}	5:02

Japanese bonus tracks
No.	Title	Writer(s)	Producer(s)	Length
16.	"Get Ur Freak On" (Bastone & Bernstein Club Mix)	Elliott; Mosley	Timbaland; Elliott^{[a]}; Bastone & Bernstein^{[b]}	4:11
17.	"Higher Ground (Prelude)"	Elliott; Mosley; Kim Burrell	Timbaland; Elliott^{[a]}	1:46
18.	"Higher Ground" (featuring Karen Clark Sheard, Yolanda Adams, Kim Burrell, Dorinda Clark Cole, Mary Mary & Tweet)	Elliott; Mosley; Burrell	Timbaland; Elliott^{[a]}	5:02

Reissue bonus tracks
No.	Title	Writer(s)	Producer(s)	Length
16.	"4 My People" (Basement Jaxx remix)	Elliott; Mosley; Brockman; Nisan Stewart; Dante Nolan; Eve Jeffers	Nisan; D-Man; Elliott^{[a]}; Timbaland^{[b]}; Basement Jaxx^{[b]}	4:56
17.	"Higher Ground (Prelude)"	Elliott; Mosley; Kim Burrell	Timbaland; Elliott^{[a]}	1:46
18.	"Higher Ground" (featuring Karen Clark Sheard, Yolanda Adams, Kim Burrell, Dorinda Clark Cole, Mary Mary & Tweet)	Elliott; Mosley; Burrell	Timbaland; Elliott^{[a]}	5:02

Notes

- ^{^[a]} signifies a co-producer
- ^{^[b]} signifies an additional producer

Sample credits

- "Whatcha Gon' Do" contains an uncredited sample of "Colonial Mentality" by Fela Kuti and the Afrika 70.

== Charts ==
=== Weekly charts ===
Weekly chart performance for Miss E... So Addictive
Chart (2001–2003)	Peak position
Austrian Albums (Ö3 Austria)	23
Belgian Albums (Ultratop Flanders)	16
Belgian Albums (Ultratop Wallonia)	11
Canadian Albums (Billboard)	8
Dutch Albums (Album Top 100)	14
European Top 100 Albums (Music & Media)	11
French Albums (SNEP)	22
German Albums (Offizielle Top 100)	12
Irish Albums (IRMA)	45
Japanese Albums (Oricon)	42
New Zealand Albums (RMNZ)	32
Norwegian Albums (VG-lista)	30
Scottish Albums (Official Charts)	29
Swedish Albums (Sverigetopplistan)	27
Swiss Albums (Schweizer Hitparade)	4
UK Albums (Official Charts)	10
UK R&B Albums (Official Charts)	2
US Billboard 200	2
US Top R&B/Hip Hop Albums (Billboard)	1

=== Year-end charts ===
2001 year-end chart performance for Miss E... So Addictive
Chart (2001)	Peak position
Belgian Albums (Ultratop Flanders)	96
Belgian Alternative Albums (Ultratop Flanders)	45
Belgian Albums (Ultratop Wallonia)	86
Canadian Albums (Nielsen SoundScan)	109
Canadian R&B Albums (Nielsen SoundScan)	27
Canadian Rap Albums (Nielsen SoundScan)	14
UK Albums (OCC)	133
US Billboard 200	61
US Top R&B/Hip-Hop Albums (Billboard)	22
Worldwide Albums (IFPI)	48

2002 year-end chart performance for Miss E... So Addictive
Chart (2002)	Position
Belgian Albums (Ultratop Flanders)	74
Belgian Alternative Albums (Ultratop Flanders)	35
Canadian R&B Albums (Nielsen SoundScan)	94
Canadian Rap Albums (Nielsen SoundScan)	51

== Certifications ==
Certifications for Miss E... So Addictive
Region	Certification	Certified units/sales
Canada (Music Canada)	Platinum	100,000^{^}
France (SNEP)	Gold	100,000^{*}
United Kingdom (BPI)	Platinum	317,000
United States (RIAA)	Platinum	1,767,000
^{*} Sales figures based on certification alone.^{^} Shipments figures based on certification alone.
