= I'm Really Hot =

2004 single by Missy Elliott

Single by Missy Elliott

from the album This Is Not a Test!
- Released: January 12, 2004
- Length: 3:30
- Label: The Goldmind Inc.; Elektra; Violator
- Songwriters: Missy Elliott; Tim Mosley
- Producers: Missy Elliott; Timbaland

Missy Elliott singles chronology
"Party to Damascus" (2004)	"I'm Really Hot" (2004)	"Tush" (2004)

Music video
- "I'm Really Hot" on YouTube

"I'm Really Hot" is a song by American rapper Missy Elliott. It was written and produced by Elliott and Timbaland for her fifth studio album, This Is Not a Test! (2003). Released as the second and final single from the album in January 2004, it reached the top 20 of the Danish Singles Chart. The accompanying music video makes reference to the Quentin Tarantino movie Kill Bill: Volume 1 (2003) and includes a dance break over "Hot Music" by Soho.

== Music video ==
A music video for "I'm Really Hot" was directed by Bryan Barber. Billboard critic Brian Josephs noted that the clip "expands on the love of Japanese culture from the Meyers videos and makes it the main crux. Missy has beef with a Japanese crew, so they dance through it. 'I'm Really Hot' works more as a time capsule than most Missy videos from the '00s, with its loose-fitting blazer/jeans attire. And krumping."

== Track listing ==
Maxi-CD single

1. "I'm Really Hot" (amended version) – 3:42
2. "I'm Really Hot" (explicit version) – 3:42
3. "I'm Really Hot" (instrumental) – 3:44
4. "Pass That Dutch" (remix amended; featuring Busta Rhymes) – 4:34
5. "Pass That Dutch" (remix explicit; featuring Busta Rhymes) – 4:34

CD single

1. "I'm Really Hot" (explicit version) – 3:42
2. "I'm Really Hot" (instrumental) – 3:44
3. "Hurt Sumthin" – 3:43
4. "Pass That Dutch" (remix explicit; featuring Busta Rhymes) – 4:34

== Charts ==
=== Weekly charts ===
Weekly chart performance for "I'm Really Hot"
Chart (2004)	Peak position
Australia (ARIA)	35
Australian Urban (ARIA)	15
Denmark (Tracklisten)	14
Ireland (IRMA)	32
Italy (FIMI)	47
New Zealand (Recorded Music NZ)	25
Scottish Singles Sales (Official Charts)	31
Switzerland (Schweizer Hitparade)	73
UK Singles (Official Charts)	22
UK Hip Hop/R&B (Official Charts)	8
US Billboard Hot 100	59
US Hot R&B/Hip-Hop Songs (Billboard)	26
US Hot Rap Songs (Billboard)	18
US Rhythmic Airplay (Billboard)	17

=== Year-end charts ===
Year-end chart performance for "I'm Really Hot"
Chart (2004)	Position
US Rhythmic Top 40 (Billboard)	87

== Release history ==
Release history for "I'm Really Hot"
Region	Date	Format(s)	Label(s)	Ref.
United States	January 12, 2004	Rhythmic contemporary; urban contemporary radio	The Goldmind Inc.; Elektra; Violator	
Australia	March 15, 2004	CD	The Goldmind Inc.; Elektra; Violator	
United Kingdom	March 22, 2004	CD	The Goldmind Inc.; Elektra; Violator	
