= Party to Damascus =

Single by Wyclef Jean featuring Missy Elliott

from the album The Preacher's Son
- Released: September 30, 2003 (UK); November 25, 2003 (Europe)
- Recorded: 2002
- Genre: Reggae fusion; hip hop; dancehall
- Length: 4:03
- Label: J Records
- Songwriters: Jerry Duplessis; Missy Elliott; Wyclef Jean
- Producers: Duplessis; Jean

Wyclef Jean singles chronology
"Pussycat" (2002)	"Party to Damascus" (2003)	"President" (2004)

Missy Elliott singles chronology
"Pass That Dutch" (2003)	"Party to Damascus" (2003)	"I'm Really Hot" (2004)

Audio video
- "Party to Damascus" on YouTube

"Party to Damascus" is a reggae fusion and hip hop song by Haitian rapper Wyclef Jean featuring guest vocals from Missy Elliott. It was written by Jean, Elliott, and Jerry Duplessis for his fourth studio album, The Preacher's Son (2003). Released as the album's lead single, it peaked at #65 on the Billboard Hot 100, #34 on the Hot R&B/Hip-Hop Songs Chart, #49 on the Swedish Singles Chart and #20 on the Norwegian Singles Chart. In Europe, the song was released as a double A-side with "Industry", a song which charted at #73 on the U.S. R&B chart due to strong downloads.

== Track listing ==
UK CD Single (82876 568222)

1. "Party to Damascus" - 4:03
2. "Party to Damascus" (Radio Edit - No Intro) - 3:45
3. "Party to Damascus" (Instrumental) - 4:03

European CD Single

1. "Party to Damascus" - 4:03
2. "Industry" - 3:02
3. "Industry" (Reggae Version Featuring Trial) - 3:26
4. "Industry" (Video) - 3:42

== Charts ==
=== Weekly charts ===
Chart (2003)	Peak position
Germany (GfK)	65
Norway (VG-lista)	20
Sweden (Sverigetopplistan)	49
UK Singles (Official Charts)	29
US Billboard Hot 100	65
US Hot R&B/Hip-Hop Songs (Billboard)	34
