= Masquerade (Wyclef Jean album) =

Studio album by Wyclef Jean
- Released: June 18, 2002
- Length: 68:55
- Label: Columbia
- Producer: Clep Sound; Jerry "Wonder" Duplessis; Wyclef Jean; Farel Jean; Jessica Harley; Shea Taylor

Wyclef Jean chronology
The Ecleftic: 2 Sides II a Book (2000)	Masquerade (2002)	Greatest Hits (2003)

Singles from Masquerade
- 1. "Two Wrongs" Released: May 13, 2002; 2. "Pussycat" Released: November 18, 2002; 3. "Masquerade" Released: May 4, 2003; 4. "Message to the Streets" Released: July 25, 2003

Masquerade is the third studio album released by Haitian hip hop musician Wyclef Jean. It was released by Columbia Records on June 18, 2002 in the United States. The album debuted at number six on the US Billboard 200 chart, making it Jean's highest-charting album. The title song "Masquerade" featuring M.O.P. was later removed from all streaming platforms and is no longer available.

== Promotion ==
The album features the singles "Two Wrongs", "Pussycat" and "Knockin' On Heaven's Door". Tom Jones makes a guest appearance on the album, singing his rendition of "Pussycat".

== Critical reception ==
Professional ratings
Aggregate scores
Source	Rating
Metacritic	60/100
Review scores
Source	Rating
AllMusic	3/5 stars
Blender	4/5 stars
The Guardian	3/5 stars
NME	8/10
Q	3/5 stars
RapReviews	7.5/10
Rolling Stone	3/5 stars
The Rolling Stone Album Guide	2/5 stars
The Source	4/5 stars
Spin	5/10

Masquerade was met with generally mixed or average reviews from music critic. On review aggregator Metacritic, the album received a score of 60 out of 100 based on 8 reviews. AllMusic editor Stephen Thomas Erlewine rated the album three out of five stars. He found that the "primary problem is that Wyclef wants to be everything to all people [...] He pushes too hard on sermonizing, no matter if it's pompous pleas to the ghettos or heartfelt laments, which offsets the lighter tracks. Instead of sounding generous and openhearted, it's a bit muddled and confusing, especially when taken all at once – but when isolated in parts, or heard in passing, it's an enjoyable record." Robert Christgau, writing for Rolling Stone, felt that "Wyclef's third solo album, while entertaining enough, is short on the sane, humane pleasures so plentiful on the first two. Even those who believe there's nothing wrong with star-time cameos, high-profile samples and world-music beats won't spin this disc a year from now and delight in one minor stroke after another."

PopMatters wrote: "As always, Wyclef’'s creativity and talent save the album from being a failure. His splendid guitar skills and knack for making strong tracks ultimately overshadow his second-rate skills on the mic. Nevertheless, without a clear theme or direction, Masquerade is the least enjoyable of Wyclef's three albums. For the next album, hopefully Wyclef will finally decide to stick to his strengths and leave the rapping to those who are good at it." The A.V. Club's Nathan Rabin found that Masquerade "is far from an embarrassment, but rarely has Jean's fabled eclecticism felt so tired." He noted that "Jean has always been a musician of outsized strengths and weaknesses, but on Masquerade, his weaknesses begin to obscure his formidable strengths. Yet another overreaching, overlong musical erector set, the album offers an uneven, conceptually muddled tour of the rapper's current musical obsessions, from gritty underground hip-hop to Caribbean music."

== Commercial performance ==
Masquerade debuted at number six on the US Billboard 200 chart, selling 82,000 copies in its first week of release. This became Jean’s second US top-ten album on the chart. The album also debuted at number two on the US Top R&B/Hip-Hop Albums chart. By May 2003, the album had sold 357,000 copies in the United States.

== Track listing ==
Masquerade – Standard edition
No.	Title	Writer(s)	Producer(s)	Length
1.	"Message to the Streets (Intro)" (performed by Eric Edwards, Felipe Luciano, and Raymond Duplessis)	Wyclef Jean; Jerry Duplessis		0:58
2.	"Peace God" (featuring Prolific)	W. Jean; Duplessis; Benjamin Lattimore; Toshio Nomura; Itsuro Hattori	Wyclef Jean; Jerry "Wonder" Duplessis; Clep Sound	3:51
3.	"PJ's" (featuring Governor and Prolific)	W. Jean; Duplessis; Shea Taylor	Wyclef Jean; Jerry "Wonder" Duplessis; Shea Taylor	3:59
4.	"80 Bars"	W. Jean; Duplessis	Wyclef Jean; Jerry "Wonder" Duplessis	4:30
5.	"Masquerade" (featuring M.O.P., Bumpy Knuckles, and Miri)	Farel Jean; W. Jean; Duplessis; Jamal Grinnage; Eric Murray; James F. Campbell; Jerry Lordan	Sedeck; Wyclef Jean; Jerry "Wonder" Duplessis	3:59
6.	"1-800-Henchman (Interlude)" (performed by Jimmy Henchman)			0:11
7.	"You Say Keep It Gangsta" (featuring Butch Cassidy and Sharissa)	W. Jean; Duplessis; Neftali Santiago	Wyclef Jean; Jerry "Wonder" Duplessis	3:58
8.	"Party Like I Party"	W. Jean; Duplessis; Teflon; Darryl Radcliff	Teflon; Wyclef Jean; Jerry "Wonder" Duplessis	3:46
9.	"Oh What a Night"	W. Jean; Duplessis	Wyclef Jean; Jerry "Wonder" Duplessis	4:01
10.	"Hot 93.1 (Interlude)" (performed by Eric Edwards)			0:04
11.	"Pussycat" (featuring Tom Jones)	W. Jean; Duplessis; Taylor; Burt Bacharach; Hal David	Wyclef Jean; Jerry "Wonder" Duplessis; Shea Taylor	3:48
12.	"Midnight Lovers (Interlude)" (performed by Eric Edwards)			0:07
13.	"Two Wrongs" (featuring Claudette Ortiz)	W. Jean; Duplessis	Wyclef Jean; Jerry "Wonder" Duplessis; Cory Rooney (add.)	3:49
14.	"Instant Request (Interlude)" (performed by Big E)			0:19
15.	"Thug Like Me"	W. Jean; Duplessis	Wyclef Jean; Jerry "Wonder" Duplessis	4:44
16.	"Daddy"	W. Jean; Duplessis; Jennifer Hamady	Wyclef Jean; Jerry "Wonder" Duplessis	3:30
17.	"Knockin' on Heaven's Door"	W. Jean (add.); Bob Dylan	Wyclef Jean; Jerry "Wonder" Duplessis	4:01
18.	"The Eulogy (Interlude)" (performed by Felipe Luciano)	W. Jean; Duplessis		0:40
19.	"War No More"	W. Jean; Duplessis	Wyclef Jean; Jerry "Wonder" Duplessis	3:59
20.	"The Mix Show" (featuring Prolific, FAMS, G.O.D., and D.G.)	W. Jean; Duplessis; Errol Sistrunk; Hakim Bey Scott; Damon Leigh; Eugene Alfonso	Ed Roc; Wyclef Jean; Jerry "Wonder" Duplessis	4:06

Masquerade – Bonus tracks
No.	Title	Writer(s)	Producer(s)	Length
21.	"MVP Kompa" (featuring Melky)	W. Jean; Duplessis	Wyclef Jean; Jerry "Wonder" Duplessis	5:09
22.	"Ghetto Racine (PJ's Creole Mix)" (featuring Ja Rah Rah)	W. Jean; Duplessis	Wyclef Jean; Jerry "Wonder" Duplessis	5:26

Masquerade – Japan bonus track
No.	Title	Producer(s)	Length
23.	"Africa"	Jerry "Wonder" Duplessis	6:46

Sample credits

- "Peace God" contains elements from:
  - "Let's Straighten It Out", written by Benjamin Lattimore, and performed by Latimore.
  - "Chuji Komari-Uta", written by Toshio Nomura and Itsuro Hattori, and performed by Yatsuo Koyama and Tokyo Mandalin.
- "Masquerade" contains replayed elements from "Apache", written by Jerry Lordan.
- "You Say Keep It Gangsta" contains elements from "Two Sisters of Mystery", written by Neftali Santiago, and performed by Mandrill.
- "Oh What a Night" contains replayed elements from:
  - "December, 1963 (Oh, What a Night)", written by Bob Gaudio and Judy Parker.
  - "Leaving on a Jet Plane", written by John Denver.
- "Pussycat" contains elements from "What's New Pussycat?", written by Burt Bacharach and Hal David, and performed by Tom Jones.
- "The Mix Show" contains elements from:
  - "Pass the Dutchie", written by Jackie Mittoo, Headley Bennett, Lloyd Ferguson, Leroy Sibbles, Robert Lyn, Huford Brown, and Fitzroy Simpson; performed by Musical Youth.
  - "Material Man", written by Gregory Isaacs and Sylvester Weise, performed by Gregory Isaacs.

== Charts ==
=== Weekly charts ===
Weekly chart performance for Masquerade
Chart (2002)	Peak position
Australian Albums (ARIA)	47
Austrian Albums (Ö3 Austria)	14
Dutch Albums (Album Top 100)	99
French Albums (SNEP)	76
German Albums (Offizielle Top 100)	20
New Zealand Albums (RMNZ)	20
Norwegian Albums (VG-lista)	7
Scottish Albums (OCC)	54
Swedish Albums (Sverigetopplistan)	8
Swiss Albums (Schweizer Hitparade)	13
UK Albums (OCC)	30
US Billboard 200	6
US Top R&B/Hip-Hop Albums (Billboard)	2

=== Year-end charts ===
Year-end chart performance for Masquerade
Chart (2002)	Position
Canadian R&B Albums (Nielsen SoundScan)	90
Canadian Rap Albums (Nielsen SoundScan)	48
US Top R&B/Hip-Hop Albums (Billboard)	62

== Certifications ==
Certifications for Masquerade
Region	Certification	Certified units/sales
New Zealand (RMNZ)	Gold	7,500^{‡}
^{‡} Sales+streaming figures based on certification alone.
