= Lick Shots =

Single by Missy Elliott

from the album Miss E... So Addictive
- Released: May 1, 2001
- Studio: Westlake (Los Angeles, California)
- Length: 3:52
- Label: Elektra; Goldmind
- Songwriters: Melissa Elliott; Timothy Mosley
- Producer: Timbaland

Missy Elliott singles chronology
"Get Ur Freak On" (2001)	"Lick Shots" (2001)	"Bootylicious" (remix) (2001)

Audio video
- "Lick Shots" on YouTube

"Lick Shots" is a buzz single by American rapper Missy Elliott from her third album, Miss E... So Addictive (2001). The song was written and produced by both Elliott and frequent collaborator Timbaland.

Although it was never intended to be released as an actual album single, the song was instead released as a buzz single to generate further attention for Elliott's third album. The song was released promotionally two weeks prior to the release of Elliott's third album and charted moderately on Billboard Hot Rap Songs and Hot R&B/Hip-Hop Singles & Tracks. Prior to its release, the song appeared as a snippet in the music video to Elliott's preceding single, "Get Ur Freak On".

In April 2008, the song was used during Anete Jensen & Daniel Sarr's "hip-hop" challenge as part of the second-week run of the now-defunct international reality dance competition, So You Think You Can Dance Scandinavia.

"Lick Shots" contains an uncredited sample of "Simchat He'amel", by Effi Netzer.

== Track listings and formats ==
12" vinyl

1. "Lick Shots" (Original)
2. "Get Ur Freak On" (Bastone & Bernstein Club Mix)
3. "Lick Shots" (Instrumental)
4. "Lick Shots" (Acapella)
5. "Get Ur Freak On" (Bastone & Bernstein Dub Mix)

12" promo

1. "Lick Shots" (Amended Version)
2. "Lick Shots" (Album Version)
3. "Lick Shots" (Instrumental)
4. "Lick Shots" (TV Track)
5. "Lick Shots" (Acappella)
6. "Lick Shots" (DJ Zinc vs. Missy "Misdemeanor" Elliott)

== Charts ==
Chart (2001)	Peak position
US Billboard Hot R&B/Hip-Hop Airplay	58
US Billboard Hot R&B/Hip-Hop Singles & Tracks	63
US Billboard Hot R&B/Hip-Hop Singles Sales	43
US Billboard Hot Rap Songs	25

== See also ==
- 2001 in music
- Timbaland production discography
- Missy Elliott production discography
- The Goldmind Inc.
