= 4 My People =

2002 single by Missy Elliott

Single by Missy Elliott featuring Eve

from the album Miss E... So Addictive
- Released: March 25, 2002
- Genre: Hip house
- Length: 4:49
- Label: Goldmind; Elektra
- Songwriters: Melissa Elliott; Timothy Mosley; Craig Brockman; Nisan Stewart; Dante Nolan; Eve Jeffers
- Producers: Nisan; D-Man

Missy Elliott singles chronology
"Burnin' Up" (2002)	"4 My People" (2002)	"Crew Deep" (2002)

Eve singles chronology
"Caramel" (2001)	"4 My People" (2002)	"Gangsta Lovin'" (2002)

Music video
- "4 My People" on YouTube

"4 My People" is a song by American rapper Missy Elliott. It was written by Elliott, Timbaland, Craig Brockman, Dante Nolan, Nisan Stewart, and Eve for her third studio album, Miss E... So Addictive (2001). Production was helmed by Stewart and Nolan, with Elliott serving as a co-producer and Timbaland credited as an additional producer. Eve provided additional vocals.

The track was released as the album's fourth and final single on March 25, 2002, and peaked at number two in the Netherlands and number five in the United Kingdom due to heavy airplay of the Basement Jaxx remix. The song also peaked at number eight in Denmark, and within the top 40 of the charts in Germany, Switzerland, France and Sweden.

== Critical reception ==
John Robinson from NME called "4 My People" a "four-to-the-floor straightahead dance record – even if it feels a bit on the random side in its construction. The house is bigged up." The Basement Jaxx remix of the song has been voted as one of "1001 Best Songs Ever" by Q magazine.

== Music video ==
Visuals for "4 My People" were initially released as the remaining half of the video for Elliott's previous single "Take Away" (2001), directed by Dave Meyers. They feature Elliott dancing with a big American crowd in honor of the victims of the September 11 attacks. An extended version of the clip was produced after "4 My People" was released as the fourth single from Miss E... So Addictive. It was released on March 9, 2002. In 2003, it was awarded the DanceStar Award in the Best Video category.

== Track listings ==
CD single
No.	Title	Writer(s)	Producer(s)	Length
1.	"4 My People" (Basement Jaxx remix radio edit)	Melissa Elliott; Tim Mosley; Eve Jeffers; Nisan Stewart; Craig Brockman; Dante Nolan	Nisan; D-Man; Elliott^{[a]}; Timbaland^{[b]}; Basement Jaxx^{[c]}	3:36
2.	"4 My People" (original radio edit)	Elliott; Mosley; Jeffers; Stewart; Brockman; Nolan	Nisan; D-Man; Elliott^{[a]}; Timbaland^{[b]}	3:49
3.	"Get Ur Freak On" (Superchumbo's Superfreakon remix)	Elliott; Mosley	Timbaland; Superchumbo^{[c]}	3:58

Notes

- ^{^a} denotes co-producer
- ^{^b} denotes additional producer
- ^{^c} denotes remix producer

== Credits and personnel ==
- Craig Brockman – writing
- Jimmy Douglass – engineering, mixing
- Missy Elliott – co-production, vocals, writing
- Jesse Gorman – assistant engineering
- Bernie Grundman – mastering
- Bill Importico – engineering
- Eve Jeffers – vocals (original version), writing
- Edith Louis – assistant engineering
- Tim "Timbaland" Mosley – additional production, mixing, writing
- Dante "D-Man" Nolan – production, writing
- Steve Penny – assistant engineering
- Nisan Stewart – production, writing
- Grayson Sumby – assistant engineering
- Tweet – additional vocals

== Charts ==
=== Weekly charts ===
Weekly chart performance for "4 My People"
Chart (2001–2002)	Peak position
Australia (ARIA)	20
Australian Urban (ARIA)	6
Austria (Ö3 Austria Top 40)	40
Belgium (Ultratop 50 Flanders)	3
Belgium (Ultratop 50 Wallonia)	13
Croatia International Airplay (HRT)	9
Denmark (Tracklisten)	8
Europe (Eurochart Hot 100)	15
France (SNEP)	37
Germany (GfK)	21
Hungary (Single Top 40)	9
Ireland (IRMA)	12
Netherlands (Dutch Top 40)	2
Netherlands (Single Top 100)	2
Norway (VG-lista)	12
Scottish Singles Sales (Official Charts)	8
Sweden (Sverigetopplistan)	19
Switzerland (Schweizer Hitparade)	40
UK Singles (Official Charts)	5
UK Hip Hop/R&B (Official Charts)	1

=== Year-end charts ===
Year-end chart performance for "4 My People"
Chart (2002)	Position
Belgium (Ultratop 50 Flanders)	27
Belgium (Ultratop 50 Wallonia)	62
Europe (Eurochart Hot 100)	83
Ireland (IRMA)	80
Netherlands (Dutch Top 40)	17
Netherlands (Single Top 100)	18
Sweden (Hitlistan)	82
UK Singles (OCC)	47
UK Airplay (Music Week)	48

== Certifications ==
Certifications for "4 My People"
Region	Certification	Certified units/sales
United Kingdom (BPI)	Silver	200,000^{^}
^{^} Shipments figures based on certification alone.

== Release history ==
Release dates and formats for "4 My People"
Region	Date	Format(s)	Label(s)	Ref.
United Kingdom	March 25, 2002	12-inch vinyl; CD	Goldmind; Elektra	
Australia	May 6, 2002	CD	Goldmind; Elektra	
Australia	September 2, 2002	12-inch vinyl	Goldmind; Elektra	
