= Under Construction (album) =

Studio album by Missy Elliott
- Released: November 12, 2002
- Studios: The Hit Factory Criteria (Miami, FL); Baseline Recording Studios (New York, NY); PatchWerk Recording Studios (Atlanta, GA); Quad Recording Studios (New York, NY)
- Genres: Hip-hop; old-school hip-hop; R&B
- Length: 51:31
- Labels: Goldmind; Violator; Elektra
- Producers: Missy Elliott; Timbaland; Craig Brockman; Errol "Poppi" McCalla; Nisan Stewart

Missy Elliott chronology
Miss E... So Addictive (2001)	Under Construction (2002)	This Is Not a Test! (2003)

Singles from Under Construction
- 1. "Work It" Released: September 16, 2002; 2. "Gossip Folks" Released: December 9, 2002; 3. "Back in the Day" Released: February 8, 2003

Under Construction is the fourth studio album by the American rapper Missy Elliott, released by The Goldmind Inc. and Elektra Records on November 12, 2002, in the United States. The album was primarily produced by Timbaland, with additional production by Craig Brockman, Nisan Stewart, Errol "Poppi" McCalla and Elliott herself.

The album debuted at number three on the US Billboard 200 chart, selling 259,000 copies in its first week. It was also certified double platinum by the Recording Industry Association of America (RIAA). The album received Grammy Award nominations for Best Rap Album and Album of the Year. Elliott dedicated the album to Aaliyah (who had died on August 25, 2001) and to victims of the September 11 attacks.

== Singles ==
"Work It" was released as the album's lead single on September 16, 2002. The single peaked at number 2 on the US Billboard Hot 100, staying at that position for ten weeks. As of 2023, "Work It" has sold over 3 million copies in the US alone. The official music video was directed by Dave Meyers.

Under Construction's second and final official single was "Gossip Folks", which was released on December 9, 2002. Dave Meyers directed the video. "Gossip Folks" charted in 14 countries worldwide.

"Back in the Day", featuring Jay-Z, was intended to be the album's third single. It was released in February 8, 2003, peaking at number 86 on the Billboard Hot R&B/Hip-Hop Singles & Tracks chart, but was scrapped as a single.

Additionally, another contender to be the album's official third single, was a newly recorded remix of "Pussycat" with guest vocals by Janet Jackson and featuring Lil' Kim. Elliott's label felt the song was too explicit to release and plans were withdrawn.

== Reception ==
Professional ratings
Aggregate scores
Source	Rating
Metacritic	81/100
Review scores
Source	Rating
AllMusic	5/5 stars
Blender	4/5 stars
Entertainment Weekly	B+
The Guardian	3/5 stars
Los Angeles Times	3/4 stars
NME	4/5 stars
Pitchfork	7.2/10
Q	4/5 stars
Rolling Stone	4/5 stars
USA Today	4/4 stars

Under Construction received universal acclaim from critics. At Metacritic, it earned an average score of 81 out of 100, based on 19 reviews, indicating "universal acclaim". The album was included in the book 1001 Albums You Must Hear Before You Die.

AllMusic editor John Bush called the album "one of the best rap LPs of the year." He felt that "while Timbaland's stark digital soul girds these tracks, Missy herself continues her artistic progression, trying to push hip-hop forward with an almost pleading intro and neatly emphasizing her differences from other rappers by writing tracks for nearly every facet of the female side of relationships." Rolling Stone's Gavin Edwards found that the album "sounds like habanero peppers, cinnamon and sweat" and that "Under Construction, uninhibited and unpredictable, is [Elliott's] best yet." Nathan Rabin wrote in his review for The A.V. Club: "Distraught over the death of [...] Aaliyah, Elliott finds comfort in rap's colorful past on Under Construction, which looks back while surging forward. She and Timbaland load the album with sonic and lyrical references to days gone by [...] In the long shadow of death, Elliott and Timbaland's funky, feisty, infectious music joyously celebrates life." Drowned in Sound's Chris Nettleton remarked that lead single "Work It" was a "good sample of the food for offer, individual, funky, sexy music. Add that to moments of sober thought, moments of Salt, Pepa and N.E.R.D.-y chilli sauce, moments of banging old-school, moments of silky R&B, and you have a killer album."

Blender critic Jonah Weiner felt that "like 2001's Miss E… So Addictive [...] Under Construction is a sex-obsessed dance-floor romp [...] Tempering futurism with retro-rap here, they feed the old through the new and refresh both. Shaken by violent hip-hop feuds and the passing of friends, [Elliott] asks herself how long she can keep the party going. Brilliantly reanimating the music of her youth through her club-ready sound, Elliott collapses past and present to defy death [...]." Steve Jones from USA Today considered Under Construction "Elliott's most sonically innovative effort to date, which is saying something considering the way she has always pushed the envelope [...] While everybody else is still trying to catch up to the previous trends she set, Elliott doggedly refuses to repeat herself." New York magazine's Ethan Brown described Under Construction as a "decidedly retro" album that "contrasts hip-hop's current seriousness with its more joyful past." He noted that Elliott and Timbaland "are odd authors of such paeans to the past — they share a futuristic sensibility that’s as bold as any electronic music producer's — and that's what makes Under Construction so strange and wonderful."

Entertainment Weekly's David Browne's noted that "the zigzagging, staccato lurches and wrecking-ball bass lines of [...] Timbaland, are back in force. This time, he's constructed dance-floor jams that are experimental and challenging in their malfunctioning-robot grooves or swooping and slippery. What sound like sitars, rapping aliens, and the world's funkiest vacuum cleaners zoom in and out." Los Angeles Times critic Natalie Nichols found thath "although not completely riveting, this alternately playful and serious set furthers the heavy tribal sound of 2001's Miss E ... So Addictive by fusing deceptively minimal throbbing percussion to skittering dance beats, dirty funk and lilting soul [...] If this is Missy so far, can’t wait to see what she comes up with next." NME's Victoria Segal noted that Under Construction was "stuck all over with shocks and surprises, more than enough to keep the rogue-scientist glitchmasters who mutated "Get Ur Freak On" in mischief for months." Sam Chennault from Pitchfork called Under Construction a "good record with some incredibly sick production work," while K.B. Tindal from HipHopDX found that the album was "simple yet original and it encompasses a style that's all" Elliott's." Less impressed, New York Times critic Jon Pareles wrote that "despite some charming stretches, the old-school sound wears thin over the course of an album. Having paid obeisance to the past, Elliott stands ready to take its lessons to her next party."

In 2010, Under Construction was included on Q magazine's Albums of the Century listing. The Yeah Yeah Yeahs' guitarist Nick Zinner commented on the album: "It still sounds incredibly fresh, in all meanings of the word. Karen [O, Yeah Yeah Yeahs' singer] and I listened to it all the time. We used to play it before we'd go onstage [...] "Funky Fresh Dressed" is my favourite track. I don't know what else to say other than it's amazing."

=== Year-end lists ===
Publication	Accolade	Rank	Ref.
BBC Radio 6 Music	16 Albums That Define 2002	—N/a	
HipHopDX	The 20 Best Rap Albums of All Time	3	
The Muse	The Best Albums of 2002	—N/a	
NME	Best Albums and Tracks of 2002	25	
Pitchfork	Top 50 Albums of 2002	28	
PopMatters	Best Music of 200	—N/a	
Rolling Stone	100 Best Albums of the 2000s	28	
Slant	Top 10 Albums and Singles of 2002	54	
Slant	The 100 Best Albums of the 2000s	54	
Village Voice	Top 10 Albums of 2002	10	

== Commercial performance ==
Under Construction debuted at number three on the US Billboard 200 chart, selling 259,000 copies in its first week. The album stayed on the chart for a total of 36 weeks. On July 14, 2003, the album was certified double platinum by the Recording Industry Association of America (RIAA) for sales of over two million copies in the United States. By November 2015, the album had sold 2,142,000 copies in the US.

== Track listing ==
Under Construction track listing
No.	Title	Writer(s)	Producer(s)	Length
1.	"Intro"/"Go to the Floor"	Melissa Elliott; Timothy Mosley	Timbaland; Elliott^{[A]}	5:06
2.	"Bring the Pain" (featuring Method Man)	Elliott; Mosley; Clifford Smith	Timbaland; Elliott^{[A]}	2:59
3.	"Gossip Folks" (featuring Ludacris)	Elliott; Mosley; Christopher Bridges	Timbaland; Elliott^{[A]}	3:54
4.	"Work It"	Elliott; Mosley	Timbaland; Elliott^{[A]}	4:53
5.	"Back in the Day" (featuring Jay-Z)	Elliott; Mosley; Shawn Carter	Timbaland; Elliott^{[A]}	4:55
6.	"Funky Fresh Dressed" (featuring Ms. Jade)	Elliott; Mosley	Timbaland; Elliott^{[A]}	3:56
7.	"Pussycat"	Elliott; Errol "Poppi" McCalla, Jr.	Elliott; McCalla	4:32
8.	"Nothing Out There for Me" (featuring Beyoncé)	Elliott; Craig Brockman; Nisan Stewart	Elliott; Brockman; Stewart	3:05
9.	"Slide"	Elliott; Mosley	Timbaland; Elliott^{[A]}	3:43
10.	"Play that Beat"	Elliott; Mosley	Timbaland; Elliott^{[A]}	3:02
11.	"Ain't that Funny"	Elliott; Mosley	Timbaland; Elliott^{[A]}	2:48
12.	"Hot"	Elliott; Mosley	Timbaland; Elliott^{[A]}	4:09
13.	"Can You Hear Me" (featuring TLC)	Elliott; Brockman; Stewart	Elliott; Brockman; Stewart	4:29

International bonus tracks
No.	Title	Writer(s)	Producer(s)	Length
14.	"Work It (Remix)" (featuring 50 Cent)	Elliott; Mosley; Curtis Jackson	Timbaland; Elliott^{[A]}	4:59
15.	"Drop the Bomb"	Elliott; Mosley	Timbaland; Elliott^{[A]}	3:27

Notes

- ^{^[A]} denotes co-producer

== Personnel ==
- Executive producers – Missy Elliott, Timbaland
- Producers – Missy Elliott, Timbaland, Craig Brockman, Errol "Poppi" McCalla
- Vocal assistance – Tweet, Lisa Crawford
- Engineers – Jeff Allen, Carlos "El Loco" Bedoya, Josh Butler, Jimmy Douglass, Guru, Mike "Hitman" Wilson
- Assistant engineers – Marc Stephen Lee, Steve Penny, David Snyder, Cory Williams
- Mixing – Jimmy Douglass, Timbaland
- Mixing assistance – Steamy
- Mastering – Herb Powers
- Design and art direction – Anita Marisa Boriboon, Lili Picou
- Photography – Roberto Fantauzzi

== Charts ==
=== Weekly charts ===
Weekly chart performance for Under Construction
Chart (2002)	Peak position
Australian Albums (ARIA)	26
Australian Urban Albums (ARIA)	6
Belgian Albums (Ultratop Flanders)	49
Belgian Albums (Ultratop Wallonia)	50
Canadian Albums (Nielsen SoundScan)	23
Canadian R&B Albums (Nielsen SoundScan)	5
Danish Albums (Hitlisten)	33
Dutch Albums (Album Top 100)	37
European Top 100 Albums (Music & Media)	32
French Albums (SNEP)	28
German Albums (Offizielle Top 100)	19
Irish Albums (IRMA)	53
New Zealand Albums (RMNZ)	32
Norwegian Albums (VG-lista)	36
Scottish Albums (Official Charts)	37
Singaporean Albums (RIAS)	9
Swedish Albums (Sverigetopplistan)	23
Swiss Albums (Schweizer Hitparade)	26
UK Albums (Official Charts)	23
UK R&B Albums (Official Charts)	3
US Billboard 200	3
US Top R&B/Hip-Hop Albums (Billboard)	2

=== Year-end charts ===
2002 year-end chart performance for Under Construction
Chart (2002)	Position
Canadian Albums (Nielsen SoundScan)	174
Canadian R&B Albums (Nielsen SoundScan)	31
Canadian Rap Albums (Nielsen SoundScan)	17
UK Albums (OCC)	157

2003 year-end chart performance for Under Construction
Chart (2003)	Position
Australian Albums (ARIA)	96
Australian Urban Albums (ARIA)	14
UK Albums (OCC)	148
US Billboard 200	30
US Top R&B/Hip-Hop Albums (Billboard)	7

== Certifications ==
Certifications for Under Construction
Region	Certification	Certified units/sales
Australia (ARIA)	Gold	35,000^{^}
Japan (RIAJ)	Gold	100,000^{^}
New Zealand (RMNZ)	Gold	7,500^{‡}
United Kingdom (BPI)	Gold	260,000
United States (RIAA)	2× Platinum	2,000,000^{^}
^{^} Shipments figures based on certification alone.^{‡} Sales+streaming figures based on certification alone.
