= This Is Not a Test! =

Studio album by Missy Elliott
- Released: November 25, 2003
- Recorded: April–August 2003
- Studio: The Hit Factory Criteria (Miami, FL); Skip Saylor Recording (California)
- Genre: Hip hop; dancehall; R&B
- Length: 56:05
- Label: Goldmind; Violator; Elektra
- Producer: Timbaland; Missy Elliott; Craig Brockman; Nisan Stewart; Soul Diggaz

Missy Elliott chronology
| Under Construction (2002) | This Is Not a Test! (2003) | The Cookbook (2005) |

Singles from This Is Not a Test!
- 1. "Pass That Dutch" Released: October 14, 2003; 2. "I'm Really Hot" Released: March 23, 2004

This Is Not a Test! is the fifth studio album by American rapper Missy Elliott, released by The Goldmind Inc. and Elektra Records on November 25, 2003, in the United States. It was primarily produced by Timbaland, with additional production from Craig Brockman, Nisan Stewart and Elliott herself.

The album received generally favorable reviews from critics. The album debuted at number thirteen on the US Billboard 200, selling 143,600 copies in the first week of release. It has been certified platinum by the Recording Industry Association of America (RIAA) and has sold 705,000 copies in the United States.

== Critical reception ==
Professional ratings
Aggregate scores
| Source | Rating |
|---|---|
| Metacritic | 79/100 |
Review scores
| Source | Rating |
| AllMusic | 3/5 stars |
| Entertainment Weekly | B |
| The Guardian | 3/5 stars |
| Los Angeles Times | 3.5/4 stars |
| NME | 8/10 |
| Pitchfork | 8.5/10 |
| Q | 4/5 stars |
| Rolling Stone | 4/5 stars |
| Spin | A− |
| The Village Voice | A |

This Is Not a Test! was met with generally positive reviews. At Metacritic, the album received an average score of 79 out of 100, based on 21 reviews. Rob Sheffield of Rolling Stone gave the album four out of five stars, saying, "Why anybody would choose to spend their life without a copy of This Is Not a Test! is a mystery." Dan Martin of NME gave the album eight out of ten stars, saying the album was "all about the beats" and "not a right lot else", adding it was "Missy's most uncompromising work yet". Nick Catucci of Blender gave the album three out of five stars, saying the album "lacks feeling" and asked, "besides beats, what else does she care about?" John Bush of AllMusic gave the album three out of five stars, saying the album "is an effective argument for song-by-song downloads." This Is Not a Test! placed on Slant Magazine's list of best albums of the 2000s at number 87.

=== Year-end lists ===
Appearances on year-end lists for This Is Not a Test!
| Publication | Accolade | Rank | Ref. |
|---|---|---|---|
| NPR | Best CDs of 2003 | 26 | |
| The Observer | Albums of 2003 | 8 | |

== Commercial performance ==
This Is Not a Test! debuted at number thirteen on the US Billboard 200, selling 143,600 copies in the first week of release. The album stayed on the chart for a total of 19 weeks. On December 17, 2003, the album was certified platinum by the Recording Industry Association of America (RIAA) for shipments of over one million copies in the United States. As of November 2015, the album has sold 705,000 copies in the US.

== Track listing ==
This Is Not a Test! track listing
| No. | Title | Writer(s) | Producer(s) | Length |
|---|---|---|---|---|
| 1. | "Baby Girl Interlude/Intro" (featuring Mary J. Blige) | Melissa Elliott; Timothy Mosley | Elliott; Timbaland | 2:13 |
| 2. | "Bomb Intro/Pass That Dutch" | Elliott; Mosley | Elliott; Timbaland | 3:37 |
| 3. | "Wake Up" (featuring Jay-Z) | Elliott; Mosley; Shawn Carter | Elliott; Timbaland | 4:06 |
| 4. | "Keep It Movin'" (featuring Elephant Man) | Elliott; Mosley; O'Neil Bryan | Elliott; Timbaland | 3:39 |
| 5. | "Is This Our Last Time" (featuring Fabolous) | Elliott; John Jackson; Karriem Mack; Shaun Owens | Soul Diggaz | 5:26 |
| 6. | "Ragtime Interlude/I'm Really Hot" | Elliott; Mosley; Craig Brockman | Elliott; Timbaland | 3:30 |
| 7. | "Dats What I'm Talkin About" (featuring R. Kelly) | Elliott; Nisan Stewart; Brockman | Elliott; Stewart; Brockman; Kelly | 4:48 |
| 8. | "Don't Be Cruel" (featuring Monica & Beenie Man) | Elliott; Mosley; Anthony Davis | Elliott; Timbaland | 4:33 |
| 9. | "Toyz Interlude/Toyz" | Elliott; Mosley; Brockman | Elliott; Timbaland; Brockman | 2:52 |
| 10. | "Let It Bump" | Elliott; Mosley | Elliott; Timbaland | 2:50 |
| 11. | "Pump It Up" (featuring Nelly) | Elliott; Mosley; Cornell Haynes | Elliott; Timbaland | 3:05 |
| 12. | "It's Real" | Elliott; Brockman | Elliott; Brockman | 2:52 |
| 13. | "Let Me Fix My Weave" | Elliott; Mosley | Elliott; Timbaland | 3:59 |
| 14. | "Spelling Bee Interlude/Spelling Bee" | Elliott; Mosley | Elliott; Timbaland | 3:34 |
| 15. | "I'm Not Perfect" (featuring The Clark Sisters) | Elliott; Stewart; Brockman | Elliott; Stewart; Brockman | 3:49 |
| 16. | "Outro" (featuring Mary J. Blige) | Elliott; Mosley | Elliott; Timbaland | 1:21 |

=== Sample credits ===
- "Pass That Dutch":
  - 'The Rapper' by The Jaggerz (1970)
  - 'Magic Mountain' by Eric Burdon and War (1970)
  - 'Don't Let Me Be Misunderstood' by Santa Esmeralda (1977)
  - 'Potholes in My Lawn' by De La Soul (1989)
  - 'Scenario' by A Tribe Called Quest feat. Leaders of the New School (1991)
- "Keep It Movin":
  - 'I Know I've Been Wrong' by Mashmakhan (1970)
- "Is This Our Last Time":
  - 'The Second Time Around' by Shalamar (1979)
- "I'm Really Hot":
  - 'Buffalo Gals' by Malcolm McLaren (1982)
  - 'Release Yourself' by Aleem (1984)
  - 'Hot Music (Jazz Mix)' by Soho (1989)
  - 'Doin It' by LL Cool J (1995)
- "Don't Be Cruel":
  - 'Push It' by Salt-N-Pepa (1986)
- "Let It Bump":
  - 'I Cram to Understand U' by MC Lyte (1988)
- "Pump It Up":
  - 'Please, Please, Please' by James Brown and The Famous Flames (1956)
- "Let Me Fix My Weave":
  - 'Please Understand' by MC Lyte (1989)

== Personnel ==
- June Ambrose – stylist
- Carlos "El Loco" Bedoya – engineer
- Beenie Man – vocals, guest appearance
- Ian Blanch – engineer
- Bless – scratching, group member
- Mary J. Blige – vocals, guest appearance
- Stacy Boge – photo production
- Anita Marisa Boriboon – art direction, design
- Craig "Boogie" Brockman – keyboards, producer
- Jay Brown – executive producer
- Suzanne Burge – product manager
- Demacio Castellon – mixing assistant
- Vadim Chislov – mixing assistant
- The Clark Sisters – vocals, guest appearance
- Annette Coleman – hair stylist
- Jimmy Douglass – engineer
- Elephant Man – vocals, guest appearance
- Missy Elliott – vocals, producer, executive producer
- Fabolous – vocals, guest appearance
- Roberto Fantauzzi – photo production
- Linda Fields – background vocals
- Andre Johnson – coordination
- Claudine Joseph – product manager
- R. Kelly – vocals, guest appearance
- Michael Kennedy – prop design
- Scott Kieklak – mixing
- Safiya Lewis – coordination
- Nelly – vocals, guest appearance
- Lili Picou – design
- Herb Powers – mastering
- Chris Puram – engineer
- Senator Jimmy D – mixing
- Nisan Stewart – producer
- Timbaland – producer, executive producer
- Alonzo Vargas – assistant engineer

== Charts ==
=== Weekly charts ===
Weekly chart performance for This Is Not a Test!
| Chart (2003–2004) | Peak position |
|---|---|
| Australian Albums (ARIA) | 39 |
| Australian Urban Albums (ARIA) | 5 |
| Austrian Albums (Ö3 Austria) | 67 |
| Belgian Albums (Ultratop Flanders) | 32 |
| Belgian Albums (Ultratop Wallonia) | 75 |
| Canadian Albums (Nielsen SoundScan) | 41 |
| Canadian R&B Albums (Nielsen SoundScan) | 7 |
| Dutch Albums (Album Top 100) | 44 |
| French Albums (SNEP) | 63 |
| German Albums (Offizielle Top 100) | 37 |
| Italian Albums (FIMI) | 60 |
| Japanese Albums (Oricon) | 22 |
| New Zealand Albums (RMNZ) | 35 |
| Scottish Albums (OCC) | 69 |
| Swedish Albums (Sverigetopplistan) | 50 |
| Swiss Albums (Schweizer Hitparade) | 25 |
| UK Albums (OCC) | 47 |
| UK R&B Albums (OCC) | 10 |
| US Billboard 200 | 13 |
| US Top R&B/Hip-Hop Albums (Billboard) | 3 |

=== Year-end charts ===
Year-end chart performance for This Is Not a Test!
| Chart (2004) | Position |
|---|---|
| Australian Urban Albums (ARIA) | 17 |
| US Billboard 200 | 110 |
| US Top R&B/Hip-Hop Albums (Billboard) | 41 |

== Certifications ==
Certifications for This Is Not a Test!
| Region | Certification | Certified units/sales |
|---|---|---|
| Australia (ARIA) | Gold | 35,000^{^} |
| Canada (Music Canada) | Gold | 50,000^{^} |
| New Zealand (RMNZ) | Gold | 7,500^{^} |
| United Kingdom (BPI) | Gold | 100,000^{^} |
| United States (RIAA) | Platinum | 1,000,000^{^} |
^{^} Shipments figures based on certification alone.

== Release history ==
This Is Not a Test! release history
| Region | Date |
|---|---|
| Germany | November 24, 2003 |
| United Kingdom | November 24, 2003 |
| Canada | November 25, 2003 |
| France | November 25, 2003 |
| Japan | November 25, 2003 |
| United States | November 25, 2003 |
