= Pass That Dutch =

2003 single by Missy Elliott

Single by Missy Elliott

from the album This Is Not a Test!
- B-side: "Wake Up"; "Hurt Sumthin"
- Released: September 29, 2003
- Studio: Hit Factory Criteria (Miami, Florida)
- Length: 3:41
- Label: The Goldmind Inc.; Elektra
- Songwriters: Melissa Elliott; Timothy Mosley; Paul Huston; David Jolicoeur; Vincent Mason; Kelvin Mercer; Thomas Allen; Harold Ray Brown; Morris Dickerson; Jerry Goldstein; Lonnie Jordan; Lee Levitin; Charles Miller; Howard E. Scott
- Producers: Missy Elliott; Timbaland

Missy Elliott singles chronology
"Cop That Shit" (2003)	"Pass That Dutch" (2003)	"Party to Damascus" (2003)

Music video
- "Pass That Dutch" on YouTube

"Pass That Dutch" is a song by American rapper Missy Elliott. It was written and produced by Elliott and Timbaland for her fifth studio album, This Is Not a Test! (2003), and contains samples of "Magic Mountain" by War and "Potholes in My Lawn" by De La Soul.

Released as the album's lead single in September 2003, "Pass That Dutch" reached number nine on the US Billboard Hot Rap Tracks chart and number 27 on the Billboard Hot 100. It additionally peaked at number 10 in United Kingdom and reached the top 20 in Finland and Norway. The song was ranked first on MuchMusic's "Top 50 MuchVibe Videos of All Time" countdown and 291st on Pitchfork Media's "Top 500 songs of the 2000s".

== Music video ==
The Dave Meyers directed video features Elliott on a farm, dancing under a UFO, on a stage as a beauty queen being cheered on by a crowd of Bratz dolls, in a car where one of the other passengers eats a man after he sets off the car alarm, and on the Empire State Building in a parody of King Kong. This is the second song where Elliott references Aaliyah, as her picture is on Elliott's desk in the beginning of the music video. The song also features the first verse and chorus of "Wake Up" alongside cameo appearances from former 106 & Park personality Free and Elliott's former protégé Lil' Brianna. Images of Aaliyah are displayed on t-shirts worn by Elliott and back up dancers in this closing segment.

== Track listings ==
US 12-inch single

A1. "Pass That Dutch" (amended main version)
A2. "Pass That Dutch" (main version)
A3. "Pass That Dutch" (instrumental)
A4. "Pass That Dutch" (acappella)
B1. "Wake Up" (amended main version)
B2. "Wake Up" (main version)
B3. "Wake Up" (TV track)
B4. "Wake Up" (acappella)

European CD single

1. "Pass That Dutch" (explicit version)
2. "Hurt Sumthin"

UK and Australian CD single

1. "Pass That Dutch" (amended version)
2. "Pass That Dutch" (explicit version)
3. "Hurt Sumthin"

UK 12-inch single

A1. "Pass That Dutch" (amended version)
A2. "Pass That Dutch" (explicit version)
B1. "Pass That Dutch" (acappella)
B2. "Pass That Dutch" (instrumental)
B3. "Hurt Sumthin"

== Charts ==
=== Weekly charts ===
Chart (2003–2004)	Peak position
Australia (ARIA)	26
Australian Urban (ARIA)	11
Belgium (Ultratop 50 Flanders)	27
Belgium (Ultratip Bubbling Under Wallonia)	10
Finland (Suomen virallinen lista)	18
Germany (GfK)	55
Hungary (Single Top 40)	2
Ireland (IRMA)	25
Italy (FIMI)	29
Netherlands (Dutch Top 40)	39
Netherlands (Single Top 100)	38
Norway (VG-lista)	17
Scottish Singles Sales (Official Charts)	19
Sweden (Sverigetopplistan)	49
Switzerland (Schweizer Hitparade)	31
UK Singles (Official Charts)	10
UK Hip Hop/R&B (Official Charts)	4
US Billboard Hot 100	27
US Dance Club Songs (Billboard) Scumfrog remix	35
US Hot R&B/Hip-Hop Songs (Billboard)	17
US Hot Rap Songs (Billboard)	9
US Rhythmic Airplay (Billboard)	8

=== Year-end charts ===
Chart (2003)	Position
UK Urban (Music Week)	16
US Rhythmic Top 40 (Billboard)	78

== Certifications ==
Certifications for "Pass That Dutch"
Region	Certification	Certified units/sales
New Zealand (RMNZ)	Gold	15,000^{‡}
^{‡} Sales+streaming figures based on certification alone.

== Release history ==
Region	Date	Format(s)	Label(s)	Ref.
United States	September 29, 2003	Rhythmic contemporary; urban radio	Goldmind; Elektra	
United States	October 6, 2003	Contemporary hit radio	Goldmind; Elektra	
United Kingdom	November 10, 2003	12-inch vinyl; CD	Goldmind; Elektra	
Australia	November 24, 2003	CD	Goldmind; Elektra	

== In popular culture ==
- The song was predated by "Pass the Dutchie", released by Musical Youth in 1982 and "Pass the Kouchie" by the Mighty Diamonds (also 1982)
- The song was featured in the film Mean Girls.
- It was briefly used in an episode of The Catherine Tate Show where Lauren Cooper gets married, the censored version was used.
