= One Minute Man =

2001 single by Missy Elliott featuring Ludacris

Single by Missy Elliott featuring Ludacris

from the album Miss E... So Addictive
- Released: July 3, 2001
- Length: 4:35
- Label: Goldmind; Elektra
- Songwriters: Melissa Elliott; Christopher Bridges; Timothy Mosley
- Producers: Missy Elliott; Timbaland; Big Tank

Missy Elliott singles chronology
"Bootylicious" (remix) (2001)	"One Minute Man" (2001)	"Take Away" (2001)

Ludacris singles chronology
"Bia' Bia'" (2001)	"One Minute Man" (2001)	"Area Codes" (2001)

Music video
- "One Minute Man" on YouTube

"One Minute Man" is a song by American rapper Missy Elliott. It was written and produced by Elliott and Timbaland for her third studio album, Miss E... So Addictive (2001), and features guest vocals by rapper Ludacris. Incorporating elements of East Asian music, the song deals with premature ejaculation.

"One Minute Man" was released as the album's second single in July 2001 and peaked at number 15 on the US Billboard Hot 100 chart. In the United Kingdom, the single reached number 10 and became Elliott's second consecutive song to reach the top 10. Elsewhere, "One Minute Man" entered the top 40 in several European countries.

Rapper Trina appears alongside Elliott and Ludacris in the video version remix of the song. A third version featuring Jay-Z was included as a bonus track on Miss E... So Addictive. Elliott performed "One Minute Man" and "Get Ur Freak On" at the 2001 MTV Video Music Awards as a medley and a tribute to Aaliyah.

== Background ==
The song includes samples from the 1976 David Pomeranz song "Greyhound Mary".

== Reception ==
Writing for Pitchfork, Dan Kilian, a music critic, describes the first half of Miss E... So Addictive as "a six-track attack that's rare for any genre" and notes that "Missy harmonizes with herself on 'One Minute Man', again keeping the beat simple under a squeaking synthesizer hook, and this time allowing Ludacris to reprise the record's freak-getting-on theme."

== Music video ==
A music video for "One Minute Man" was directed by Dave Meyers. Vibe editor Shenequa Golding called the visuals a "scandalous single fun. Whether it be a headless Missy dancing in the corner, or her sliding across the marble floor with the introduction of the fast-paced "Whatcha Gonna Do," the video proved to be more stimulating than the one minute some men can offer [...] All jokes aside, Missy could've taken a cliche uber sexual approach, but it's Missy, when has she ever been cliche or predictable?"

== Track listings ==
All tracks are written by Timbaland, Ludacris, Missy Elliott, David Pomeranz, Angie Fisher, and Katrina Laverne Taylor.

CD single
No.	Title	Producer(s)	Length
1.	"One Minute Man" (edit) (featuring Ludacris)	Timbaland; Big Tank]^{[a]}; Missy Elliott^{[a]}	3:40
2.	"One Minute Man" (album version) (featuring Ludacris)	Timbaland; Big Tank^{[a]}; Elliott^{[a]}	4:35
3.	"One Minute Man" (Oxide & Neutrino remix)	Timbaland; Big Tank^{[a]}; Elliott^{[a]}; Oxide & Neutrino^{[b]}	5:11

Notes

- ^{^[a]} signifies a co-producer
- ^{^[b]} signifies a remix producer

== Charts ==
=== Weekly charts ===
Weekly chart performance for "One Minute Man"
Chart (2001)	Peak position
Australia (ARIA)	91
Belgium (Ultratop 50 Flanders)	30
Belgium (Ultratop 50 Wallonia)	25
Europe (Eurochart Hot 100)	40
France (SNEP)	31
Germany (GfK)	38
Ireland (IRMA)	47
Netherlands (Dutch Top 40 Tipparade)	4
Netherlands (Single Top 100)	41
Scottish Singles Sales (Official Charts)	28
Sweden (Sverigetopplistan)	26
Switzerland (Schweizer Hitparade)	92
UK Singles (Official Charts)	10
UK Dance (Official Charts)	4
UK Hip Hop/R&B (Official Charts)	4
US Billboard Hot 100	15
US Hot R&B/Hip-Hop Songs (Billboard)	8
US Pop Airplay (Billboard)	30
US Rhythmic Airplay (Billboard)	5

=== Year-end charts ===
Year-end chart performance for "One Minute Man"
Chart (2001)	Position
UK Singles (OCC)	193
UK Urban (Music Week)	9
US Hot R&B/Hip-Hop Singles & Tracks (Billboard)	42
US Rhythmic Top 40 (Billboard)	25

== Certifications ==
Certifications
Region	Certification	Certified units/sales
New Zealand (RMNZ)	Gold	15,000^{‡}
^{‡} Sales+streaming figures based on certification alone.

== Release history ==
Release dates and formats for "One Minute Man"
Region	Date	Format(s)	Label(s)	Ref(s).
United States	July 3, 2001	Rhythmic contemporary radio	Elektra; Goldmind	
United States	July 3, 2001	Urban contemporary radio	Elektra; Goldmind	
United Kingdom	August 6, 2001	12-inch vinyl; CD; cassette	Elektra; Goldmind	
United States	August 28, 2001	Contemporary hit radio	Elektra; Goldmind	
Australia	September 17, 2001	CD	Elektra; Goldmind	
France	October 16, 2001	CD; maxi CD	Elektra; Goldmind	
