= Get Ur Freak On =

2001 single by Missy Elliott

Single by Missy Elliott

from the album Miss E... So Addictive
- Released: March 13, 2001
- Studio: Westlake (Los Angeles)
- Genre: Hip-hop; bhangra; avant-garde
- Length: 3:56
- Label: Elektra; Goldmind
- Songwriters: Melissa Elliott; Timothy Mosley
- Producer: Timbaland

Missy Elliott singles chronology
"Is That Your Chick (The Lost Verses)" (2000)	"Get Ur Freak On" (2001)	"Lick Shots" (2001)

Music video
- "Get Ur Freak On" on YouTube

"Get Ur Freak On" is a song by American rapper Missy Elliott. It was written and produced by Elliott and Timbaland for her third studio album, Miss E... So Addictive (2001), and was released as the album's lead single on March 13, 2001. Based on heavy bhangra elements, a popular music and dance form from the region of Punjab in India, the song features a six-note base that is a Punjabi melody played on a tumbi and rhythm and bassline played on tabla.

"Get Ur Freak On" reached number seven on the US Billboard Hot 100 chart. Internationally, "Get Ur Freak On" became a top-10 success in the Netherlands and the United Kingdom, where it became her first solo top-10 hit, peaking at number four. A remix of the song featuring Nelly Furtado was a dance club hit during this period. In February 2015, "Get Ur Freak On" re-entered the Hot 100 at number 40, following Elliott's performance at the Super Bowl XLIX halftime show. In 2025, the song was named the greatest of the 21st century by Rolling Stone magazine.

== Background ==
"Get Ur Freak On" was written and produced by Elliott and longtime collaborator Timbaland for her third studio album, Miss E... So Addictive (2001). Recorded late in the album’s production, Elliott felt that the project was missing a key element, while Timbaland considered this concern to be overanalyzing. During this period, Timbaland experimented with a keyboard, creating a series of sounds that eventually formed the basis for the track that would become "Get Ur Freak On."

== Critical reception and legacy ==
"Get Ur Freak On" is widely considered one of Missy Elliott's best songs. Stereogum and Paste ranked the song number one and number two, respectively, on their lists of the 10 greatest Missy Elliott Songs. In 2011, the song was listed 14th on Rolling Stone's "Best Songs of the 2000s". In 2004 and 2010, it was ranked at number 466 on their "500 Greatest Songs of All Time" list. In the 2021 reranking, it was ranked at number eight. In 2002, "Get Ur Freak On" was named the best single released in the year 2001 by The Village Voice's Pazz & Jop annual year-end critics' poll. The song also lists at number seven on Pitchfork Media's Top 500 Songs of the 2000s and number 16 on VH1's "Greatest Songs of Hip-Hop". In 2011, NME placed it at number 17 on its list "150 Best Tracks of the Past 15 Years". In April 2014, the song was remixed with the Black Keys' song "Keep Me" for the original soundtrack to Neighbors (2014). In 2002, "Get Ur Freak On" won Elliott the Grammy Award for Best Rap Solo Performance.

== Music video ==
"Get Ur Freak On" marked the first time that Elliott would team up with director Dave Meyers, who would become a frequent collaborator on subsequent projects. Elliott, a fan of his work, decided to consult Meyers after she had taken him to see Crouching Tiger, Hidden Dragon in theatre. Nadine "Hi-Hat" Ruffin served as the videos's choreographer. In "Get Ur Freak On," Elliott's dancers throw shapes in "some kind of industrial underworld – crouched on concrete blocks, hanging upside down like bats," while Elliott herself act both "queenly and cartoonish: craning her head from her body; swinging from a chandelier; and in one memorably trippy, Matrix-like effect, spitting long-distance into a male dancer's mouth." Rappers Ludacris, LL Cool J, Timbaland, Ja Rule, Busta Rhymes, Master P, Spliff Star, Lil' Romeo, Eve, Nate Dogg and singer Nicole Wray make cameo appearances in the video.

== Track listings ==
US 12-inch single

A1. "Get Ur Freak On" (album version) – 3:57
A2. "Get Ur Freak On" (amended version) – 3:57
B1. "Get Ur Freak On" (instrumental) – 3:53
B2. "Get Ur Freak On" (a cappella) – 3:10
B3. "Get Ur Freak On" (TV track) – 3:58

UK 12-inch single

A1. "Get Ur Freak On" (edit) – 3:31
A2. "Get Ur Freak On" (album version) – 3:57
B1. "Get Ur Freak On" (instrumental) – 3:53
B2. "Get Ur Freak On" (a cappella) – 3:11
B3. "Get Ur Freak On" (TV track) – 3:50

UK CD single

1. "Get Ur Freak On" (edit) – 3:31
2. "Get Ur Freak On" (amended version) – 3:57
3. "Get Ur Freak On" (instrumental) – 3:53

UK cassette single and European CD single

1. "Get Ur Freak On" (edit) – 3:31
2. "Get Ur Freak On" (album version) – 3:57

Australian CD single

1. "Get Ur Freak On" (edit) – 3:31
2. "Get Ur Freak On" (radio edit—Bastone & Bernstien club mix) – 3:27
3. "Get Ur Freak On" (amended version) – 3:57
4. "Get Ur Freak On" (instrumental) – 3:53

== Charts ==
=== Weekly charts ===
Weekly chart performance for "Get Ur Freak On"
Chart (2001)	Peak position
Australia (ARIA)	44
Australian Urban (ARIA)	11
Austria (Ö3 Austria Top 40)	44
Belgium (Ultratop 50 Flanders)	17
Belgium (Ultratop 50 Wallonia)	21
Canada (Nielsen SoundScan)	12
Europe (Eurochart Hot 100)	17
France (SNEP)	39
Germany (GfK)	19
Ireland (IRMA)	25
Italy (FIMI)	48
Netherlands (Dutch Top 40)	10
Netherlands (Single Top 100)	9
New Zealand (Recorded Music NZ)	24
Scottish Singles Sales (Official Charts)	16
Sweden (Sverigetopplistan)	22
Switzerland (Schweizer Hitparade)	16
UK Singles (Official Charts)	4
UK Dance (Official Charts)	1
UK Hip Hop/R&B (Official Charts)	2
US Billboard Hot 100	7
US Hot R&B/Hip-Hop Songs (Billboard)	3
US Hot Rap Songs (Billboard)	7
US Pop Airplay (Billboard)	19
US Rhythmic Airplay (Billboard)	3

=== Year-end charts ===
Year-end chart performance for "Get Ur Freak On"
Chart (2001)	Position
Belgium (Ultratop 50 Flanders)	98
Belgium (Ultratop 50 Wallonia)	78
Canada (Nielsen SoundScan)	100
Netherlands (Dutch Top 40)	75
Netherlands (Single Top 100)	62
UK Singles (OCC)	68
UK Urban (Music Week)	8
US Billboard Hot 100	35
US Hot R&B/Hip-Hop Singles & Tracks (Billboard)	11
US Mainstream Top 40 (Billboard)	94
US Rhythmic Top 40 (Billboard)	12

== Certifications ==
Certifications for "Get Ur Freak On"
Region	Certification	Certified units/sales
New Zealand (RMNZ)	Platinum	30,000^{‡}
United Kingdom (BPI)	Platinum	600,000^{‡}
United States (RIAA)	2× Platinum	2,000,000^{‡}
^{‡} Sales+streaming figures based on certification alone.

== Release history ==
Release dates and formats for "Get Ur Freak On"
Region	Date	Format(s)	Label(s)	Ref(s).
United States	March 13, 2001	Urban contemporary radio	Elektra; Goldmind	
United States	March 20, 2001	Rhythmic contemporary radio	Elektra; Goldmind	
United Kingdom	April 16, 2001	12-inch vinyl; CD; cassette	Elektra; Goldmind	
Australia	May 21, 2001	CD	Elektra; Goldmind	

== Cover versions ==
- In 2005, Scottish acoustic rocker KT Tunstall released her version of "Get Ur Freak On" performed for BBC Radio Live Lounge on certain versions of the single for "Suddenly I See".
- Anda Adam's single "Nai, Nai" from her debut album, Confidențial (2005), samples the Elliot's track.
- Shawn Lee's Ping Pong Orchestra released a surf rock rendition on the 2007 album Hits the Hits.
- American rock band Eels also released a version of "Get Ur Freak On" on Meet the Eels: Essential Eels Vol. I, having frequently performed it live during the Shootenanny! tour several years previously.
- On the comedy show Fonejacker, the track was parodied by Kayvan Novak as he tried to get "Sounds of the Universe" record shop manager Jon Burnip, to identify the track by singing the tune with nonsensical lyrics.
- In Britney Spears' Britney: Piece of Me revamped Vegas residency show, "Get Ur Freak On" was performed as a medley along with other Elliott songs.
- Though not covered, the melody of the song was sampled in the song “ILoveYourAunt” by American rappers A$AP Ferg and $ki Mask the Slump God.
- Japanese experimental music group Satanicpornocultshop sampled lyrics from "Get Ur Freak On" in their 2010 songs "[r.i.p.] Tide" and " Pinky."
- During James Corden's Carpool Karaoke segment Michelle Obama rapped with Missy Elliott "Get Ur Freak On".
