= Lil' Mo discography =

American R&B artist discography

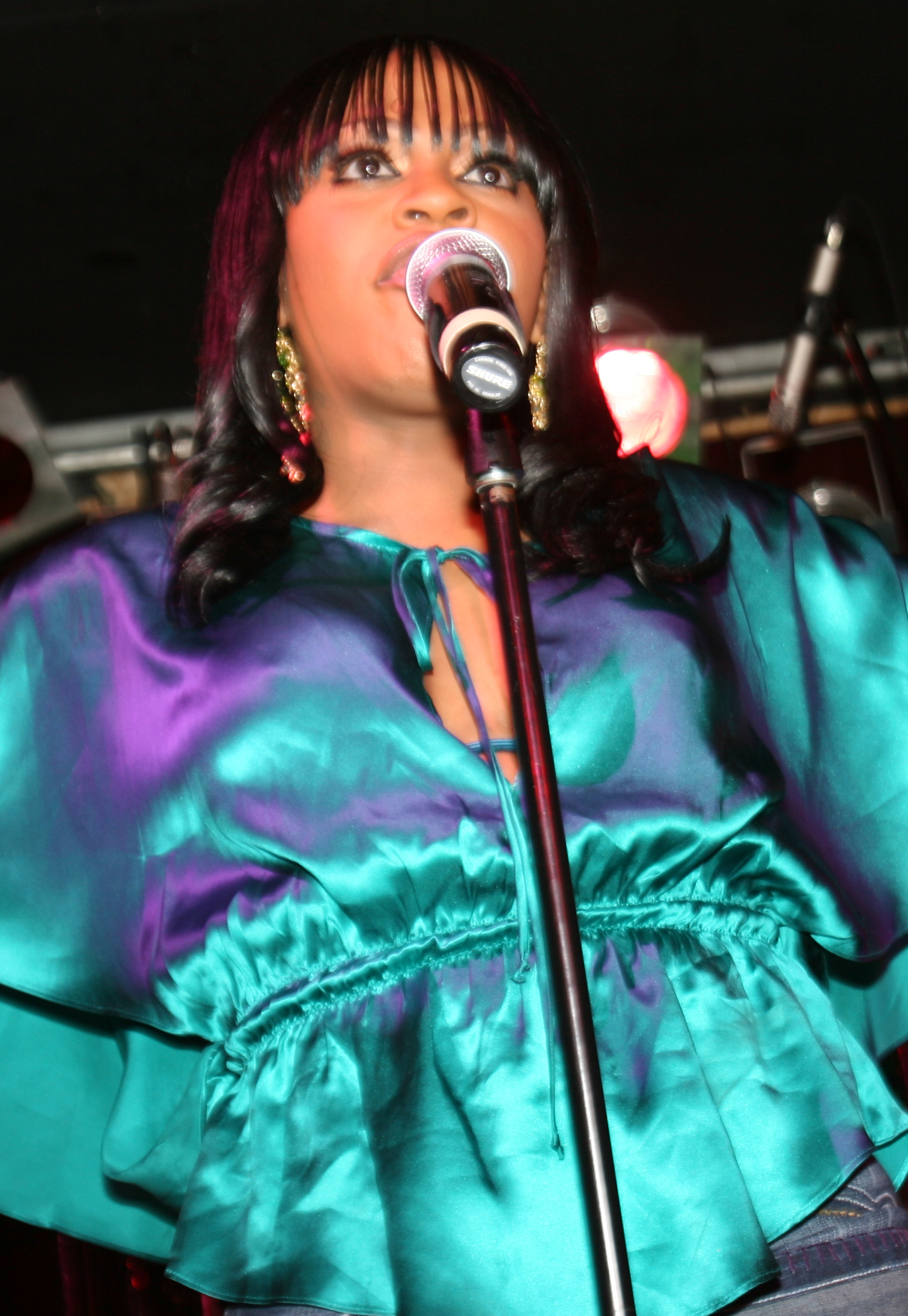
- Lil' Mo performing in October 2005
- Studio albums: 5
- Singles: 14
- Featured singles: 16

The discography of American R&B singer-songwriter and rapper Lil' Mo consists of five studio albums, two mixtapes and fourteen singles (sixteen as featured performer).

On June 26, 2001, Lil' Mo released her first album Based on a True Story. The album peaked at number 14 on the US Billboard 200 albums chart. The album spawn three singles: "Ta Da", "Superwoman Pt. II", and "Gangsta (Love 4 the Streets)". On April 29, 2003, she released her second album, Meet the Girl Next Door, which featured the single "4Ever".

In 2007 and 2011, Lil' Mo released her follow-up studio efforts, Pain & Paper and P.S. I Love Me respectively.

== Albums ==
=== Studio albums ===
List of albums, with selected chart positions, sales figures and certifications
Title	Album details	Peak chart positions	
Title	Album details	US	US R&B
Based on a True Story	Released: June 26, 2001; Label: Elektra, WEA; Formats: CD, digital download	14	6
Meet the Girl Next Door	Released: April 29, 2003; Label: Elektra, WEA; Formats: CD, digital download	17	4
Pain & Paper	Released: August 28, 2007; Label: Drakeweb Music Group, HoneyChild, Koch; Formats: CD, digital download	112	14
P.S. I Love Me	Released: November 1, 2011; Label: HoneyChild, Bronx Bridge Entertainment; Formats: CD, digital download	—	—
The Scarlet Letter	Released: October 27, 2014; Label: Penalty; Formats: CD, digital download	—	—
"—" denotes a recording that did not chart or was not released in that territory.

=== Mixtapes ===
Title	Album details
P.S. I Love You	Released: May 8, 2011; Label: Bronx Bridge Entertainment; Format: Digital download
No Shit Sherlock	Released: April 21, 2014; Label: HoneyChild Entertainment; Format: Digital download

== Singles ==
=== As lead artist ===
List of singles as a lead artist, with selected chart positions, showing year released and album name
Title	Year	Peak chart positions			Album
Title	Year	US	US R&B	UK	Album
"5 Minutes" (featuring Missy Elliott)	1998	—	—	72	Why Do Fools Fall in Love soundtrack
"Ta Da"	2000	95	21	—	Based on a True Story
"Superwoman Pt. II" (featuring Fabolous)	2001	11	4	80	Based on a True Story
"Gangsta (Love 4 the Streets)"	2001	—	57	—	Based on a True Story
"4Ever" (featuring Fabolous)	2003	37	13	—	Meet the Girl Next Door
"Ten Commandments" (featuring Lil' Kim)	2003	—	101	—	Meet the Girl Next Door
"Hot Boys, Hot Girls" (featuring Lil Wayne)	2004	—	28	—	Non-album singles
"Yeah Yeah Yeah" (featuring Miri Ben-Ari)	2005	—	—	—	Non-album singles
"Mother of Your Child"	2005	—	—	—	Non-album singles
"Dem Boyz"	2005	—	86	—	Non-album singles
"Sumtimes I" (featuring Jim Jones)	2007	—	—	—	Pain & Paper
"On the Floor" (solo or remix featuring Fatman Scoop)	2011	—	—	—	P.S. I Love Me
"I Love Me" (featuring Tweet)	2011	—	—	—	P.S. I Love Me
"I'm a Diva"	2013	—	—	—	Non-album singles
"L's Up"	2013	—	—	—	Non-album singles
"Should've Never Let You Go"	2014	—	—	—	The Scarlet Letter
"30 Minutes"	2017	—	—	—	Non-album singles
"Hold Me Down"	2017	—	—	—	Non-album singles
"Broken Heart"	2021	—	—	—	Non-album singles
"Shining Star" (featuring T-Pain and Fatman Scoop)	2021	—	—	—	Non-album singles
"—" denotes a recording that did not chart or was not released in that territory.

=== As featured artist ===
List of singles as a featured artist and certifications, with selected chart positions, showing year released and album name
Title	Year	Peak chart positions					Certifications	Album
Title	Year	US	US R&B	US Rap	NLD	UK	Certifications	Album
"Hot Boyz" (Missy Elliott featuring Lil' Mo)	1999	5	1	1	—	18	RIAA: Platinum	Da Real World
"Whatever" (Ideal featuring Lil' Mo)	2000	47	11	—	—	31		Ideal
"I'll Trade (A Million Bucks)" (Keith Sweat featuring Lil' Mo)	2000	—	36	—	—	—		Didn't See Me Coming
"Put It on Me" (Ja Rule featuring Lil' Mo and Vita)	2000	8	2	11	7	—	BPI: Silver	Rule 3:36
"I Cry" (Ja Rule featuring Lil' Mo)	2001	40	11	25	—	—		Rule 3:36
"Lay It Down" (Jermaine Dupri and R.O.C. featuring Lil' Mo)	2001	—	117	—	—	—		Instructions
"Niggaz Nature" (2Pac featuring Lil' Mo)	2001	—	—	—	—	—		Until the end of Time
"Pray for Me" (Mobb Deep featuring Lil' Mo)	2002	—	—	—	—	—		Infamy
"Where's My..?" (Adam F featuring Lil' Mo)	2002	—	—	—	100	37		Kaos: The Anti-Acoustic Warfare
"If I Could Go!" (Angie Martinez featuring Lil' Mo and Sacario)	2002	15	26	11	—	61		Animal House
"Can't Let You Go" (Fabolous featuring Lil' Mo and Mike Shorey)	2003	4	2	2	10	9	BPI: Silver	Street Dreams
"Thick & Thin" (E-40 featuring Lil' Mo)	2004	—	120	—	—	—		The Best of E-40: Yesterday, Today, and Tomorrow
"Endow Me" (Coko featuring Lil' Mo, Fantasia and Faith Evans)	2006	—	—	—	—	—		Grateful
"Bulletproof Love/One Love" (Foxy Brown featuring Lil' Mo)	2008	—	—	—	—	—		Brooklyn's Don Diva
"Cry" (LL Cool J featuring Lil' Mo)	2008	—	119	—	—	—		Exit 13
"It Ain't Love" (MSTRKRFT featuring Lil' Mo)	2009	—	—	—	—	—		Fist of God
"—" denotes a recording that did not chart or was not released in that territory.

=== Promotional singles ===
Year	Single	Chart position	Album
Year	Single	US R&B	Album
1999	"If You Wanna Dance"	—	—N/a
2003	"21 Answers" (featuring Free)	50	—N/a
2007	"Lucky Her"	—	Pain & Paper

== Guest appearances ==
List of guest appearances, with other performing artists, showing year released and album name
Title	Year	Other performer(s)	Album
"Curiosity"	1998	Nicole, Anthony Dent	Make It Hot
"Prelude (I Can't See)"	1998	Nicole	Make It Hot
"I Can't See"	1998	Nicole	Make It Hot
"Nervous"	1998	Nicole	Make It Hot
"Silly Love Song"	1998	Nicole	Make It Hot
"Borrowed Time"	1998	Nicole	Make It Hot
"Do You Wanna Ride?"	1998	Yo Yo, Kelly Price, Missy Elliott	Ebony
"I Would If I Could"	1998	Yo Yo, Missy Elliott	Ebony
"It's Alright"	1998	Queen Latifah, Faith Evans	Order in the Court
"You Don't Know"	1999	Missy Elliott	Da Real World
"Mr. D.J."	1999	Missy Elliott, Lady Saw	Da Real World
"Good Morning Heartache"	1999	Ol' Dirty Bastard	Nigga Please
"Is This the End"	1999	3rd Storee	3rd Storee
"Girlfriend/Boyfriend"	1999	Blackstreet, Janet Jackson, Ja Rule, Eve	Finally
"Tell Me"	1999	Case, Levar A. Wilson	Personal Conversation
"Hello It's Me"	1999	Gerald LeVert	The Mod Squad soundtrack
"Parking Lot Pimpin'"	2000	Jay-Z, Memphis Bleek, Beanie Sigel	The Dynasty: Roc La Familia
"Somebody's Gonna Die Tonight"	2000	Dave Bing	Irv Gotti Presents: The Murderers
"Somebody's Gonna Die Tonight"	2000	Dave Bing	Romeo Must Die soundtrack
"That's What I'm Lookin' For" (Mr. Dupri's Mix)	2000	Da Brat, Jermaine Dupri, Missy Elliott	Big Momma's House soundtrack
"Club 2G" (Demo)	2000	Missy Elliott	Dark Angel soundtrack
"Bounce with Me" (Radio Remix)	2000	Lil Bow Wow, R.O.C.	Bounce with Me single
"Last Night"	2000	Changing Faces	Visit Me
"Monica"	2000	Before Dark	Daydreamin'
"Secrets"	2000	Before Dark	—N/a
"Straight Up"	2000	Chanté Moore	Exposed
"No Disrespect"	2000	Tamar Braxton, Missy Elliott	Tamar
"Shotgun"	2000	Torrey Carter	The Life I Live
"It Takes Two"	2000	Torrey Carter	The Life I Live
"(Cream) Ride or Die"	2000	Torrey Carter, Nokio of Dru Hill	The Life I Live
"Keep It G.A.N.G.S.T.A."	2001	Nate Dogg, Xzibit	Music & Me
"Hottie"	2001	Code5, Missy Elliott, Timbaland	Hottie single
"Interlude"	2001	DJ Clue?	The Professional 2
"Hi Maintenance"	2001	Yukmouth	Thug Lord: The New Testament
"Take You Home"	2001	Fabolous	Ghetto Fabolous
"Can't Deny It"	2001	Fabolous, Nate Dogg	Ghetto Fabolous
"Niggaz Nature" (Remix)	2001	2Pac	Until the end of Time
"Wrong Idea"	2001	Bad Azz	Personal Business
"No Playaz"	2001	Angie Martinez, Tony Sunshine	Up Close and Personal
"Sponsor (I Need, I Need, I Need)"	2001	Canela Cox	Canela
"All Those Fancy Things"	2001	Koffee Brown	Mars/Venus
"Wore Out Your Welcome"	2001	Allure	Sunny Days
"So Low"	2001	Tha Eastsidaz	Duces 'n Trayz: The Old Fashioned Way
"Finders Keepers"	2001	Jaheim	Ghetto Love
"I've Changed" (Interlude)	2001	Missy Elliott	Miss E... So Addictive
"I Know Whutchu Like"	2001	Mocha, Petey Pablo, Missy Elliott	Bella Mafia
"Mardi Gras"	2001	Mocha, Missy Elliott	Bella Mafia
"The Streetz"	2001	Mocha	Bella Mafia
"Daddy Get the Cash"	2002	Styles P	A Gangster and a Gentleman
"I've Come too Far"	2002	Tina Moore	Time Will Tell
"Wreck Yo' Body"	2002	Tina Moore	Time Will Tell
"Ten Years"	2002	Darius Rucker	Back to Then
"Why You Tell Me That"	2002	Ms. Jade	Girl Interrupted
"She Wanna Know"	2003	Joe Budden	Joe Budden
"Thug Nature"	2003	Sheek Louch	Take It in Blood
"We Fly"	2003	Ja Rule, Vita, DJ Envy	The Desert Storm Mixtape: Blok Party, Vol. 1
"Keep It Real"	2003	Nate Dogg, Fabolous	Nate Dogg
"Holla at Somebody Real"	2004	Fabolous	Real Talk
"Don't Stop the Music"	2004	E-40, Lil' Flip, DJ Kay Slay	The Streetsweeper, Vol. 2
"Shake That Ass"	2004	Mannie Fresh	The Mind of Mannie Fresh
"Freak wit Me"	2004	Mannie Fresh	—N/a
"Chocolate Cities"	2004	Lady Luck	I Did the Remix mixtape
"Never Stop Thuggin'"	2004	Knoc-turn'al	The Way I Am
"Hold Your Head Up High"	2005	Miri Ben-Ari	The Hip-Hop Violinist
"Solid Chic"	2005	Birdman	Fast Money
"Could It Be"	2005	Snook da Rokk Star	Dirty South Ballin 2
"Baby" (Remix)	2006	Fabolous	Loso's Way: Rise to Power mixtape
"What Should I Do"	2007	Fabolous	From Nothin' to Somethin'
"Unbelievable"	2007	Whuteva	Cruise Control mixtape
"We Takin' Over" (Ladies Mix)	2007	Remy Ma, Jacki-O, Trina, DJ Lazy K	Shesus Khryst
"Make Me Better" (Remix)	2007	Fabolous	Make Me Better single
"Good Lovin'" (Back Like That Remix)	2007	Da Brat, DJ Cocoa Chanelle	—N/a
"Lovely"	2009	Felicia "Snoop" Pearson	—N/a
"Nothing to Lose"	2010	Mancini	—N/a
"Prayer Song for Haiti"	2010	Kim Burrell, Musiq Soulchild, Tye Tribbett, James Hall, Nancey Jackson-Johnson, Michelle Williams, Nikki Ross & Anaysha Figueroa	Prayer Song for Haiti single
"Troubled World (Part 2)"	2010	Faith Evans, Estelle	Something About Faith (Best Buy version)
"U & Me"	2011	Ja Rule	Renaissance Project
"Mystery"	2012	Mashonda	Love, Mashonda
"Cut U Off"	2014	Trina	—N/a
"Best of Me"	2018	Bre-Z	The Grl.
"Complicated"	2018	Akbar V	The Coldest Summer
"Next Lifetime"	2019	ShawNe	—N/a
"Know Better"	2024	Kehlani, Vince Staples	While We Wait 2
