= Hot Girl =

Hot Girl or Hot Girls may refer to:

== Film and television ==
- "Hot Girl" (The Office), an episode of the American TV series
- Hot Girl, a 2018 short film by Erin Richards

== Music ==
- "Hot Girl" (R.I.O. song), 2010
- "Hot Girl" (Belly song), 2009
- "Hot Girl" (Sabrina song), 1987
- "Hot Girls", by Lil' Mo, 2004
- "Hot Girl", a song by Megan Thee Stallion from the 2018 album Tina Snow
- "Hot Girl", a song by Charli XCX for the 2022 film Bodies Bodies Bodies
- "Hot Girl", a song by Dove Cameron from the 2026 album Final Girl

== See also ==
- Hot Girls, Bad Boys, a 1985 album by Bad Boys Blue
- "Hot Girls in Love", a 1983 song by Loverboy
- "I Need a Hot Girl", a 1999 single by Hot Boys
