= Dem Boyz =

Dem Boyz may refer to:

- "Dem Boyz" (Boyz n da Hood song)
- "Dem Boyz" (Lil' Mo song)

== See also ==
- "We Dem Boyz", Wiz Khalifa song
- Briscoe Brothers, often known as "Dem Boys"
