= Based on a True Story (Lil' Mo album) =

Studio album by Lil' Mo
- Released: June 26, 2001
- Length: 58:46
- Label: Elektra; WEA
- Producer: Michael Allen; Darryl McClary; Shep Crawford; Brycyn Evans; DJ Clue?; Duro; Troy Johnson

Lil' Mo chronology
Based on a True Story (2001)	Meet the Girl Next Door (2003)

Singles from Based on a True Story
- 1. "Ta Da" Released: April 10, 2000; 2. "Superwoman Pt. II" Released: March 6, 2001; 3. "Gangsta (Love 4 the Streets)" Released: August 2001

Based on a True Story is the debut album by American singer Lil' Mo. It was released on June 26, 2001, through Elektra Records and Warner Music Group. Created over a period of three years, in which its original version was delayed numerous times following arguments with Elektra executives over her image and material, and with preceding singles such as "5 Minutes" and "Ta Da" failing to chart noticeably on the mainstream charts, it went through major reconstructions throughout its creation process. Lil' Mo worked with production duo Flavahood on the majority of the album, with Shep Crawford, Duro and DJ Clue also contributing.

Upon its release, Based on a True Story earned generally mixed to positive reviews from music critics who complimented the album for its authenticity but were critical with its formulaic lyrics. It peaked at number 14 on the US Billboard 200 and number six on the Top R&B/Hip-Hop Albums, selling 73,000 copies in its first week of release. Elektra issued two further singles in support of the album, including "Superwoman Pt. II" featuring rapper Fabolous, which reached number 11 on the US Billboard Hot 100 and entered the top five of the Hot R&B/Hip-Hop Songs, and its follow-up "Gangsta (Love 4 the Streets)".

== Background ==
In 1998, Lil' Mo began her industry career as a songwriter, writing songs for 702, Blackstreet, Timbaland, and Total, among others. Based on her songwriting skills, she was signed by Elektra Records the same year and received exposure when she appeared on rapper Ol' Dirty Bastard's second studio album Nigga Please (1999) and Missy "Misdemeanor" Elliott's single "Hot Boyz" (1999). Elektra consulted a variety of producers to work with her on her debut album, including Shep Crawford, Brycyn Evans, DJ Clue and Troy Johnson. Darryl McClary and Mike Allen from production duo Flavahood would go on to executive produce Based on a True Story on which they placed eleven tracks. When asked about the conception of the album, Lil' Mo elaborated in a 2000 interview with Billboard: "This is a story based on my life. Each song is a chapter from my life. So there should be a chapter on there that other people can relate to as well."

Initially scheduled for a July 11, 2000 release, Elektra pushed Based on a True Story back at least three times. With the album several years in the making, and fighting with the label over her material and delays, Lil' Mo initially decided on quitting the project. Dissatisfied with what she considered mishandling by the label, she also credited the delays to Elektra's consistent tries to soften her "gangsta-girl image." While Merlin Bobb, then executive vice president of A&R, denied these claims, her manager Loreal Coppedge commented in a 2001 article for Vibe: "Fuck Elektra. In the beginning, they were punannies and scared." As part of the delays, several tracks which had been expected to appear on the album, were replaced, including "Starstruck" and "Club 2G", collaborations with rappers Missy Elliott and Naam, as well as "Why", "More Than You Know" and "What About the Children".

== Promotion ==
The project spawned several singles. In 1998, Elektra Records released the singles "If You Wanna Dance" and "5 Minutes," both of which were released as potential lead singles. However, the lack of proper charting performance from both singles resulted in a postponement for Based on a True Story; both singles would also be subsequently removed from the album project. In 2000, the label released "Ta Da" as the official lead single. The song managed to peak at 95 on the US Billboard Hot 100 and 21 on Billboard Hot R&B/Hip-Hop Songs chart but was later excluded from the standard edition of the album. In 2001, Lil' Mo later convinced Elektra to release her song "Superwoman" under the "Part II" version featuring additional vocals from rapper Fabolous. Elektra agreed and released the remixed single; the song would go on to peak at number 11 on Billboard Hot 100 and number 4 on Billboard Hot R&B/Hip-Hop Songs, becoming her most successful single by then. Another single, "Gangsta", failed to match the success of her preceding single.

== Critical reception ==
Professional ratings
Review scores
Source	Rating
AllMusic	3/5 stars
Blender	2/5 stars
NME	3.5/5 stars
USA Today	2.5/4 stars

Based on a True Story earned generally mixed to positive reviews from music critics. AllMusic editor Dan LeRoy remarked that "probably the best reference point for Lil' Mo's winning blend of street smarts and classic soul divaship is Mary J. Blige, and Based on a True Story suggests that Blige could have some serious competition in the years to come." Diana Evans from NME wrote that "for someone who’s been coined a Missy Elliott protege, this collection is heavily soulful with only a sprinkling of hiphop’s ego. Lyrically, it’s the usual formulaic I-always-wanted-to-be-a-superstar and that-man-done-me-wrong stuff, but the musical intimacy on tracks [...] suggests that Lil’ Mo may well outlive her name." USA Today's Steve Jones wrote that Based on a True Story was filled with "a slew" of "catchy hook[s]" and "infectious, quirky grooves," and while her story "isn't always compelling," it was "worth hearing more than once."

Nathasha Washington, writing for The Oklahoman, felt that Based on a True Story "affords the rapper plenty of opportunities to express her opinions regarding her family, friends and being a superstar. Lil' Mo is one artist to keep your eye on [...] The 13-track album details Lil Mo's sensuous, fierce and funny personality. Whether it's "My Story" as the album's opener or a memorable interpretation of Cyndi Lauper's "Time After Time," Lil' Mo establishes new ground in her solo effort." Billboard found that with the album, she "definitely holds her own. Whether singing about holding on to your dreams, remaining true to yourself, dissecting the relationship tango, or denouncing 'ghetto state-of-mind' materialism, Lil' Mo comes across as the real deal – not another assembly-line molded sound-alike." In a negative review for Blender, Keith Harris wrote: "Sadly, this autobiography is short on substance and long on gripes about the high-rolling lifestyle [...] Unfortunately, Story is longer on torch-song pianos and swelling post-gospel swoops than surefire melodies and state-of-the-art beats."

== Commercial performance ==
Based on a True Story debuted and peaked at number 14 on the US Billboard 200, selling 73,000 copies in its first week. On Billboard's component charts, it reached number six on the Top R&B/Hip-Hop Albums chart. The magazin ranked the album 88th on its 2001 Top R&B/Hip-Hop Albums year-end listing.

== Track listing ==
Based on a True Story
No.	Title	Writer(s)	Producer(s)	Length
1.	"Intro"	Cynthia Loving	Flavahood	0:45
2.	"My Story"	Loving	Flavahood	4:14
3.	"Supa Star" (featuring J-Star)	Loving; Michael Allen; Darryl McClary	Flavahood	4:18
4.	"Superwoman Pt. II" (featuring Fabolous)	Loving; John Jackson; Ernesto Shaw; Ken Iffil	DJ Clue; Duro	4:25
5.	"Player Not the Game" (featuring Carl Thomas)	Quincy Patrick; Joshua Thompson	Flavahood; Thompson	4:23
6.	"How Many Times"	Loving	Flavahood	4:35
7.	"2Moro"	Loving; Brycyn Evans; Troy Johnson	Evans; Johnson	4:20
8.	"Friends (Those Girls)"	Loving; Allen; McClary	Flavahood	3:52
9.	"Gangsta"	Loving; Allen; McClary	McClary; Allen	3:11
10.	"Saturday"	Loving	Flavahood	3:56
11.	"She Could Neva B Me"	Loving	Flavahood	5:13
12.	"Time After Time"	Cyndi Lauper; Rob Hyman	Flavahood	5:26
13.	"Outro"	Loving	Flavahood	1:08

Bonus tracks
No.	Title	Writer(s)	Producer(s)	Length
14.	"I Ain't Gotta"	Loving; Allen; McClary	Flavahood	4:10
15.	"Ta Da"	Anthony Crawford; Stacy Dove Daniels; Montell Jordan	Shep Crawford	4:22

Sample credits

- "Gangsta" embodies portions of "Gin and Juice", written by Harry Wayne Casey, Richard Finch, Calvin Broadus, Andre Young, S. Arrington, S. Washington, and M. Adams and performed by Snoop Dogg.
- "I Ain't Gotta" contains a sample from "Fuhgidabowdit", written by J.T. Smith, Jean-Claude Olivier, Samuel Barnes, Earl Simmons, Clifford Smith, and Reggie Noble and performed by LL Cool J.

== Personnel ==
Credits adapted from the liner notes of Based on a True Story.

- Michael Graham Allen – composer, engineer
- Ben Arrindell – engineer
- Quincy Patrick – composer
- Merlin Bobb – assistant executive producer
- Jay Brown – assistant executive producer
- Anne Catalino – engineer, mixing
- Earl Cohen – mixing
- Shep Crawford – composer, producer, vocal arrangement
- Kevin KD Davis – mixing
- C.J. DeVillar – engineer
- Fred Duro – producer
- Brycyn "Juvie" Evans – composer
- Fabolous – vocalse
- Flavahood – engineer, producer
- Andy Grassi – engineer
- Rob Hyman – composer
- Ken "Duro" Ifill – composer
- J.J. Jackson – composer
- Troy Johnson – composer, mixing, producer
- Quincy Patrick – composer
- Shae Jones – vocals (background)
- Montell Jordan – composer, vocal arrangement
- Cyndi Lauper – composer
- Lil' Mokey – vocals
- Dominick Maybank – bass
- Darryl McClary – composer, executive producer
- Pam Olivia – vocals
- Kenny Ortíz – engineer
- Herb Powers – mastering
- Todd Reynolds – orchestra
- Shawn Smith – keyboards
- Steve Souder – engineer, mixing
- Spaceman – bass, guitar
- J Star – vocals
- Carl Thomas – vocals
- Joshua Thompson – assistant producer, composer
- Alexis Yraola – design

== Charts ==
=== Weekly charts ===
Weekly chart performance for Based on a True Story
Chart (2001)	Peak position
Canadian R&B Albums (Nielsen SoundScan)	29
US Billboard 200	14
US Top R&B/Hip-Hop Albums (Billboard)	6

=== Year-end charts ===
Year-end chart performance for Based on a True Story
Chart (2001)	Position
US Top R&B/Hip-Hop Albums (Billboard)	88
