= Rule 3:36 =

Studio album by Ja Rule
- Released: October 3, 2000
- Studio: Battery Studios (New York City, New York); Sound On Sound (New York City, New York); Enterprise Studios (Los Angeles, California)
- Genre: Hardcore hip-hop; R&B
- Length: 57:48
- Label: Murder Inc.; Def Jam 2000; Island Def Jam
- Producer: Irv Gotti (also exec.); Ty Fyffe; Lil' Rob; Self Service; Damizza; Tru Stylze; Dat Nigga Reb

Ja Rule chronology
Venni Vetti Vecci (1999)	Rule 3:36 (2000)	Pain Is Love (2001)

Singles from Rule 3:36
- 1. "Between Me and You" Released: June 16, 2000; 2. "Put It on Me" Released: December 12, 2000; 3. "6 Feet Underground" Released: December 16, 2000; 4. "I Cry" Released: April 7, 2001

Rule 3:36 is the second studio album by American rapper Ja Rule. It was released on October 3, 2000, by The Island Def Jam Music Group, Def Jam Recordings and Irv Gotti's Murder Inc. Records. The album features guest appearances from Christina Milian, Lil' Mo, Shade Sheist and Jayo Felony, with producers Irv Gotti (who also executive produced the album), Ty Fyffe, Tru Stylze, Lil' Rob and Damizza contributing to the album. The album marked a significant change in Ja Rule's musical style, shifting from hardcore hip hop to a more radio-friendly pop rap oriented sound to greater success.

Rule 3:36 debuted atop of the US Billboard 200 with 276,000 copies sold in its first week and went on to be certified Triple Platinum by the Recording Industry Association of America (RIAA) on August 20, 2001, producing four singles; all of which had achieved varying degrees of chart success. The most successful single, "Put It on Me" featuring Vita, peaking at number 8 on the US Billboard Hot 100, becoming his first top-ten single on that chart as a lead artist, and scored his first nomination for Best Rap Performance by a Duo or Group at the 44th Grammy Awards.

== Background ==
Rule 3:36 contains the song titled "Fuck You", which is titled "Furious" as a clean version for radio play. The song received average airplay, and is also on the soundtrack to The Fast and the Furious (where it is titled "Furious"). The disc is still mostly radio-friendly pop-themed music unlike his later albums, which contain disses of a more dark tone. The album still contains explicit material, and was made in a clean version which only removes profanity and drug/violent lyrics are left in, although some profanity like the words "hoes" and "ass" are also left in.

== Critical reception ==
Professional ratings
Aggregate scores
Source	Rating
Metacritic	56/100
Review scores
Source	Rating
AllMusic	3/5 stars
Entertainment Weekly	B
NME	3/5 stars
Robert Christgau	(1-star Honorable Mention)
Rolling Stone	2/5 stars
The Rolling Stone Album Guide	4/5 stars
Vibe	3/5 stars
USA Today	3/4 stars

Initial critical response to Rule 3:36 was average. At Metacritic, which assigns a normalized rating out of 100 to reviews from mainstream critics, the album has received an average score of 56, based on five reviews. AllMusic editor Jason Birchmeier noted thath Rule 3:36 "includes a few radio-friendly rap-R&B hybrids, which are then filled out with the same style of Ruff Ryder-style hardcore rap that characterized his debut album, Venni Vetti Vecci (1999) [...] The result is an uneven album comprised of crossover-R&B singles and hardcore rap filler; even though the commercial prospects are improved, Rule 3:36 isn't any more satisfying than Venni Vetti Vecci had been." Derek A. Bardowell from NME found that "there's not an outstanding tune on the album to the degree of "Holla Holla", but Rule 3:36 has already proven to be successful, having topped the Billboard chart on the week of its release. And if you like Ja Rule, you’ll unquestionably love the album. Unfortunately, there's just no range and way too much negativity."

Entertainment Weekly's Josh Tyrangiel called the album a "solid follow-up" as well as a "moderately ambitious, moderately successful sophomore album." He noted that Rule 3:36 was a "soft-focus close-up of Ja Rule’s sensitive side." Wall of Sound editor Bob Gulla wrote that "there are some quasi-credible moments across the record — some aggressive, highly orchestrated, East Coast-style gangsta vignettes like "6 Feet Underground" and "One of Us" — but they don't resonate with the kind of urban drama necessary to put this one over the top." Rolling Stone's Kathryn Farr felt that "Ja Rule plays it painfully safe on his second album, doling out pop hooks over gimmicky production. His gruff voice hasn't changed, but aside from the nimble singsong flow he flexes on the fluffy radio hit "Between Me and You," Rule doesn't push himself much; he simply musters the requisite rawness ("Die") or throaty sentimentality ("I Cry"), and moves on [...] "Do you love me/ Do you hate me," Rule says on one song, but, too often, Rule 3:36 falls somewhere in between."

== Commercial performance ==
Rule 3:36 debuted at number one on both the US Billboard 200 and the Top R&B/Hip-Hop Albums chart, selling 276,000 during its first week. By November 2009, the album had sold 3,965,000 copies domestically. It was certified three-time platinum by the Recording Industry Association of America (RIAA). The album also reached Gold status in the United Kingdom and Platinum in Canada.

== Track listing ==
Rule 3:36 track listing
No.	Title	Writer(s)	Producer(s)	Length
1.	"Intro"		Lil' Rob; Irv Gotti	1:14
2.	"Watching Me"	Jeffrey Atkins; Robert Mays; Irving Lorenzo	Lil' Rob; Irv Gotti	1:55
3.	"Between Me and You" (featuring Christina Milian)	Atkins; Mays; Lorenzo	Lil' Rob; Irv Gotti	4:10
4.	"Put It on Me" (featuring Vita)	Atkins; Paul Walcott; Lorenzo; Taheem Crocker	Tru Stylze; Irv Gotti	4:23
5.	"6 Feet Underground"	Atkins; Edward Hinson; Lorenzo	Self; Irv Gotti	5:05
6.	"Love Me, Hate Me"	Atkins; Mays; Lorenzo	Lil' Rob; Irv Gotti; Ja Rule^{[a]}	4:44
7.	"Die" (featuring Tah Murdah, Black Child and Dave Bing)	Atkins; Tyrone Fyffe; Lorenzo; Ramel Gill; Crocker	Ty Fyffe; Irv Gotti	4:37
8.	"Fuck You" (featuring 01 and Vita)	Atkins; Lorenzo; Richard Wilson	Dat Nigga Reb; Irv Gotti	4:13
9.	"I'll Fuck U Girl" (Skit)		Irv Gotti	1:34
10.	"Grey Box" (Skit)		Irv Gotti	0:16
11.	"Extasy" (featuring Tah Murdah, Black Child and Jayo Felony)	Atkins; Mays; Lorenzo; Crocker; Gill; James Savage	Lil' Rob; Irv Gotti	5:06
12.	"It's Your Life" (featuring Shade Sheist)	Atkins; Lorenzo; Damion Young	Damizza	4:30
13.	"I Cry" (featuring Lil' Mo)	Atkins; Mays; Lorenzo; Cynthia Loving; Kenny Gamble; Leon Huff	Lil' Rob; Irv Gotti	5:18
14.	"One of Us"	Atkins; Fyffe; Gill; Crocker	Lil' Rob; Irv Gotti	6:00
15.	"Chris Black" (Skit)		Irv Gotti	3:02
16.	"The Rule Won't Die"	Atkins; Mays; Lorenzo	Lil' Rob; Irv Gotti	2:17
Total length:				57:48

Notes

- ^{^[a]} signifies co-producer(s)

Sample credits

- "I Cry" contains a sample from "Cry Together", written by Kenneth Gamble and Leon Huff, and performed by The O'Jays.

== Personnel ==
- Milwaukee Buck – engineer (14)
- Tom Coyne – mastering
- Supa Engineer DURO – mixing (2–8, 11, 13, 14, 16)
- Jonas Garbonick – engineer (4, 7, 8, 11, 13, 16)
- Irv Gotti – executive producer, mixing (2–8, 11–14, 16)
- Mike Schlesinger – mixing (12)
- Vachik the Terrorist – engineer (12)
- Pat Viala – engineer (2, 3, 5, 6)

== Charts ==
=== Weekly charts ===
Weekly chart performance for Rule 3:36
Chart (2000–02)	Peak position
Canadian Albums (Billboard)	8
Canadian R&B Albums (Nielsen SoundScan)	5
Dutch Albums (Album Top 100)	44
German Albums (Offizielle Top 100)	72
UK Albums (OCC)	83
UK R&B Albums (OCC)	10
US Billboard 200	1
US Top R&B/Hip-Hop Albums (Billboard)	1

=== Year-end charts ===
2000 year-end chart performance for Rule 3:36
Chart (2000)	Position
Canadian Albums (Nielsen SoundScan)	151
US Billboard 200	113
US Top R&B/Hip-Hop Albums (Billboard)	53

2001 year-end chart performance for Rule 3:36
Chart (2001)	Position
Canadian Albums (Nielsen SoundScan)	106
Canadian R&B Albums (Nielsen SoundScan)	24
Canadian Rap Albums (Nielsen SoundScan)	11
US Billboard 200	27
US Top R&B/Hip-Hop Albums (Billboard)	10

2002 year-end chart performance for Rule 3:36
Chart (2002)	Position
Canadian R&B Albums (Nielsen SoundScan)	148
Canadian Rap Albums (Nielsen SoundScan)	74

== Certifications ==
Certifications for Rule 3:36
Region	Certification	Certified units/sales
Canada (Music Canada)	Platinum	100,000^{^}
United Kingdom (BPI)	Gold	100,000^{‡}
United States (RIAA)	3× Platinum	3,000,000^{^}
^{^} Shipments figures based on certification alone.^{‡} Sales+streaming figures based on certification alone.

== See also ==
- List of Billboard 200 number-one albums of 2000
- List of Billboard number-one R&B albums of 2000
