= Grace After Midnight =

2007 memoir by Felicia "Snoop" Pearson and David Ritz

- Author: Felicia "Snoop" Pearson (Author), David Ritz (Contributor)
- Subject: Memoir
- Publisher: Grand Central Publishing
- Publication date: November 2007
- Media type: Print (hardcover)
- Pages: 240
- ISBN: 0-446-19518-9
- OCLC: 141188044
- Dewey Decimal: 791.4502/8092 B 22
- LC Class: PN2287.P34 A3 2007

Grace After Midnight: A Memoir is an American 2007 autobiographical memoir by Felicia Pearson, with author David Ritz credited as a contributor and co-author. The book chronicles Pearson's life in East Baltimore, including her birth as a 3-pound crack baby, her placement into foster care and her eight-year prison sentence in Jessup, Maryland, on second-degree murder charges. The book also chronicles her rehabilitation and how she was cast in the HBO series The Wire, where she played the eponymous character Felicia "Snoop" Pearson.

According to the memoir, Pearson says her life was turned around upon learning in prison that a close friend and drug dealer, whom she called "Uncle", was killed. Pearson said of her decision to write her book, "I just want to let people know where I came from ... to share my story. I know the Lord has blessed me. He gave me the power just to tell this story."

The book also depicts the difficulty with which Pearson attempts to adjust to life after prison; she was fired from two jobs due to her criminal background, which drove her to return temporarily to drug dealing. During an interview about the book, she said, "Every time I turned around, they kept firing me, so where else could I turn to? The streets never let you down. That's sad to say, but what (was) I supposed to be, starving? Go to a shelter?"

Pearson said she wrote the book, "so that I won't have to keep explaining" her past and her life story. She also said she hoped she could set an example for others in her situation: "(It's) just to let people know you can make it through your trials and tribulations. ... You can make it out of it." The title refers to a religious awakening Pearson had after midnight one particular night in the Jessup prison, but she also said the word "Midnight" represents her previous life, and the word "Grace" represents her new life.

Pearson was giving a book tour for Grace After Midnight while The Wire season 5 was being aired. Pearson said, "People really take this show to heart."

In the book, Pearson also describes how she used her real-life experiences in her acting performances. Specifically, she said she used to help her grandfather fix houses, which helped inspire her performance in the scene which opened The Wire's The Wire season 4, in which she purchases a nail gun that would be used to help conceal her murders.
