= Can't Let You Go =

Single by Fabolous featuring Mike Shorey and Lil' Mo

from the album Street Dreams
- Released: February 23, 2003
- Recorded: 2002
- Studio: Right Track Recording, New York City
- Genre: Hip hop; R&B
- Length: 3:43
- Label: Desert Storm, Elektra
- Songwriters: J. Jackson, C. Loving, J. Smith
- Producer: Just Blaze

Fabolous singles chronology
"4Ever" (2003)	"Can't Let You Go" (2003)	"Never Leave You (Uh Oooh, Uh Oooh)" (2003)

Lil' Mo singles chronology
"Ten Commandments" (2003)	"Can't Let You Go" (2003)	"Hot Girls" (2004)

"Can't Let You Go" is a song by American hip-hop artist Fabolous. It was released on February 23, 2003 as the second single from his second studio album Street Dreams. It is a hip hop and R&B song that features Mike Shorey and Lil' Mo and was produced by Just Blaze.

== Background ==
When Lil' Mo was going to record the first single to her debut album titled "Superwoman Pt. II", she asked DJ Clue for Fabolous to do the track with her after hearing him on one of Clue's mixtapes. She had previously worked with Jay-Z and Ja Rule, but wanted Fabolous on the track, despite only hearing him on a mixtape.

== Music video ==
The music video was filmed in Los Angeles, California on February 21 and 22, 2003, after the music video for Lil' Mo's "4Ever" was filmed in Brooklyn, New York the previous month.

Directed by Erik White, the music video starts with Fabolous creeping back into bed in the morning with one twin sister, after spending the night with the other twin. It continues showing him with the two women in similar places, expressing his admiration for both, even buying two copies of a necklace for each twin. Mike Shorey and Lil' Mo sing the chorus after each dating scene. At a restaurant, the two women confront each other, then confront Fabolous and begin to argue. The video then transitions to a song titled "Damn", where Fabolous is rapping in front of lighted letters that read "damn" while women dance behind him.

== Track listing ==
1. "Can't Let You Go" (album version)
2. "Can't Let You Go" (main remix original version)
3. "Young'n" (album version)
4. "Can't Deny It" (album version)

== Personnel ==
- Aladdin – A&R
- Tom Coyne – mastering
- Rick Rock – producer
- Jason Stasium – engineer
- Paul Gregory – assistant engineer
- Just Blaze – producer
- Fabolous – main performer
- E Bass – additional producer
- Nick Howard – assistant engineer
- Ken "DURO" Ifill – engineer, mixing
- DJ Clue? – executive producer, A&R
- DURO – executive producer, A&R
- Skane – executive producer

== Charts ==
=== Weekly charts ===
Chart (2003)	Peak Position
Australia (ARIA)	27
Australian Urban (ARIA)	9
Belgium (Ultratop 50 Flanders)	37
Germany (GfK)	70
Ireland (IRMA)	43
Netherlands (Dutch Top 40)	9
Netherlands (Single Top 100)	10
New Zealand (Recorded Music NZ)	33
Scotland Singles (Official Charts)	46
Sweden (Sverigetopplistan)	52
Switzerland (Schweizer Hitparade)	95
UK Singles (Official Charts)	14
UK Hip Hop/R&B (Official Charts)	4
US Billboard Hot 100	4
US Hot R&B/Hip-Hop Songs (Billboard)	2
US Hot Rap Songs (Billboard)	2
US Pop Airplay (Billboard)	23
US Rhythmic Airplay (Billboard)	1

=== Year-end charts ===
Chart (2003)	Position
Netherlands (Dutch Top 40)	78
Netherlands (Single Top 100)	91
UK Urban (Music Week)	25
US Billboard Hot 100	24
US Hot R&B/Hip-Hop Songs (Billboard)	11

== Certifications ==
Certifications for "Can't Let You Go"
Region	Certification	Certified units/sales
New Zealand (RMNZ)	Platinum	30,000^{‡}
United Kingdom (BPI)	Gold	400,000^{‡}
^{‡} Sales+streaming figures based on certification alone.

== Release history ==
Region	Date	Format(s)	Label(s)	Ref.
United States	February 3, 2003	Rhythmic contemporary radio	Elektra	
