= Felicia Pearson =

American actress

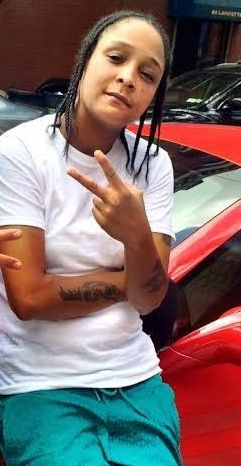
- Pearson in August 2015
- Born: May 18, 1980 (age 46); Baltimore, Maryland, U.S.
- Other name: Snoop
- Occupations: Actress; rapper; author
- Years active: 2004–present

Felicia Pearson (born May 18, 1980) is an American actress, rapper, and author. She is best known for playing Snoop, a fictionalized version of herself, on The Wire.

== Early life ==
Felicia Pearson was born in Baltimore, Maryland, on May 18, 1980, the daughter of incarcerated drug addicts; her mother was a crack addict and her father was an armed robber. She was premature at birth, weighing just 3 pounds (1.4 kg), and was not expected to live. She was so small that she was fed with an eyedropper until she could be fed normally. She grew up in an East Baltimore foster home and, according to her memoir, met her biological parents very few times. She decided to go by her foster family's surname.

Pearson was a tomboy from a young age and began dealing drugs as a teenager. At the age of 14, she was convicted of second-degree murder after shooting 15-year-old Okia Toomer, whom she later claimed was trying to attack her with a lead baseball bat. She described the incident as "the worst day of [her] life". She was tried as an adult and sentenced to two eight-year terms, to be served consecutively, at the Maryland Correctional Institution for Women in Jessup, Maryland. She was released in 2000 after serving five and a half years.

Pearson credited drug dealer Arnold Loney, whom she referred to as her uncle, with helping her turn her life around; he sent her money and visited her regularly in prison, discouraged her from getting more involved in crime, and urged her to study and get her GED. He nicknamed her "Snoop" because she reminded him of the cartoon dog Snoopy. He was shot and killed while she was in prison, prompting her to follow his advice and earn her GED. Upon her release, she found work at a car wash and fabricating car bumpers on an assembly line, but was fired from both when employers learned she had a criminal record.

== Career ==
Pearson met The Wire star Michael K. Williams in a Baltimore club. At the time, she had returned to dealing drugs as she could not hold down a job due to her criminal record. Williams invited her to come to the set one day, and introduced her to the writers and producers. After successful auditions, she was offered the role of Snoop, a fictionalized version of herself that she portrayed from 2004 to 2008. Author Stephen King called her "perhaps the most terrifying female villain to ever appear in a television series".

Pearson's role on the show launched her acting career and she appeared in music videos such as Lil' Mo's "Dem Boyz", Rick Ross' "The Boss" and "Here I Am", Ace Hood's "Cash Flow", A$AP Ferg's "Shabba", and Snoop Dogg's "So Many Pros". She acted in the Spike Lee films Da Sweet Blood of Jesus (2014) and Chi-Raq (2015), and appeared in an episode of the CBS series Blue Bloods (2016).

Outside of acting, Pearson wrote the memoir Grace After Midnight (2007). She was featured on the 2009 song "It's a Stick Up" with Tony Yayo and Mazaradi Fox, and its music video showed clips from The Wire. She appeared on the VH1 reality television series Love & Hip Hop: New York for its seventh and eighth seasons (2016–2018).

== Personal life ==
Pearson is a lesbian. As of 2008, she lives outside Baltimore with her girlfriend and their dog.

Pearson has visited prisons as a volunteer for anti-violence and literacy youth campaigns, and supported the Stay Strong Foundation.

Pearson and 60 others were arrested and charged with drug offenses on March 10, 2011, following a raid at her Baltimore home as part of a five-month DEA operation. At the first hearing, Judge John Addison Howard denied her bail and told her, "Well, you can change your appearance. I've seen the episodes of The Wire in which you appear. You look very different than you do here today, and I'm not talking about the jumpsuit, I'm talking about your general appearance." After one month in jail, Pearson was offered bail of $50,000 on April 8. In August, she pleaded guilty to the charges the day before her trial was to begin. She was sentenced to a suspended seven-year prison term, with credit for time served, and given three years of supervised probation.

== Filmography ==
Year	Title	Role	Notes
2004–2008	The Wire	Snoop	27 episodes
2009	Anthony Bourdain: No Reservations	Herself	Episode: "Rust Belt"
2013	They Die by Dawn	Bartender	
2014	Desiree	Lou(isa)	
2014	Da Sweet Blood of Jesus	Lucky Mays	
2015	Diamond Ruff	KK	
2015	By Any Means	WIZ	2 episodes
2015	Chi-Raq	Danai	
2016	Guns and Grams	Swerve	
2016	Blue Bloods	Roxy Barnes	Episode: "Good Cop Bad Cop"
2021	Asbury Park	Tag	
2021	Swagger	Lil Pip	2 episodes
2022	Scott Free	Detective Ferell	
2022	I Thought You Knew	Mia	
2023	The Family Plan	Toothpick	
