= 6 Feet Underground =

Single by Ja Rule

Single by Ja Rule

from the album Rule 3:36
- Released: December 16, 2000
- Genre: Hip hop, East Coast hip hop
- Length: 5:05
- Label: Def Jam; Murder Inc.
- Songwriters: Edward Hinson, Irving Lorenzo, Jeffrey Atkins
- Producers: Irv Gotti, Ja Rule, Self

Ja Rule singles chronology
"Put It on Me" (2000)	"6 Feet Underground" (2000)	"I Cry" (2001)

"6 Feet Underground" is the third single of Ja Rule's second studio album Rule 3:36. The song peaked #53 on the Hot R&B/Hip-Hop Songs and #25 on the Hot Rap Songs chart. In this song, Ja Rule raps about confronting his demons and his enemies who would love to see him dead. The song samples "A New Argentina" by Madonna from the 1996 film Evita.

== Music video ==
The official music video for "6 Feet Underground" was released in 2000, and was done completely in circa 2000 video game style animation. The music video is set at night. Ja Rule, while sitting on a park bench, briefly daps up three men, who then sit at a park table nearby. When Ja Rule gets up, he is approached by the same three men. This time, the three men are ominous shadowy figures with red eyes. Like a true video game hero, a long samurai sword manifests into his hand, and he slays the malicious figures. Intermittently, he is shown posing on a park bench as two small devils drinking beer dance around him. In the next scene, Ja Rule stands a top of the Apollo Theater, search lights announcing his presence as he performs. While performing, more shadowy figures with red eyes appear. Ja Rule then jumps in the back of a blue Cadillac, driven by the same two small devils earlier in the video.

In the next scene, the small devils and Ja Rule are riding around when the car comes to a stop and a police officer approaches the vehicle, flapping his arms as he rants and raves at Ja Rule, who is smoking marijuana. Slowly, his head and body start to become misshapen and he begins to turn the same color as the small devils driving the car. The Cadillac suddenly drives away after Ja Rule throws his blunt at the police officer, and the police officer spontaneously combusts in an explosion of red gore.

Ja Rule returns to the dark park from the beginning of the video and the shadowy figures do as well. However, the shadowy figures run away. Ja Rule walks back to the park bench, sits down, and pictures of Murder Inc. artists Irv Gotti, Black Child, Tah Murdah, O1, Ronnie Bumps, and Vita appear before Ja Rule disappears in a yellow flash of light.
