= Ta Da =

Single by Lil' Mo

from the album Based on a True Story
- Released: April 10, 2000
- Recorded: Paramount Studios (Hollywood, California)
- Length: 4:22
- Label: Elektra; EastWest
- Songwriters: Shep Crawford; Stacy Dove Daniels; Montell Jordan
- Producer: Shep Crawford

Lil' Mo singles chronology
"Hot Boyz" (1999)	"Ta Da" (2000)	"Whatever" (2000)

"Ta Da" is a song by American recording artist Lil' Mo. It was released as the lead single for Mo's debut album, Based on a True Story (2001). The song was written by fellow R&B singer Montell Jordan and featured production by Anthony "Shep" Crawford. Background vocals were contributed by Shae Jones, D'Andrea Foster, Shonte Taylor and Pam Olivia.

== Background ==
After the lack of success from Mo's previous singles: "5 Minutes" and "If You Wanna Dance,"—both of which were in consideration as a leading single for Based on a True Story—"Ta Da" was chosen by Mo's label Elektra as a lead single. Mo agreed with Elektra's decision, stating: "We thought it would be a good lead-up single because this is the point in a lot of females' lives when they claim their independence." When asked on the meaning of the song's title, Mo added: "So you tell your girlfriends, 'I wish he would leave.' But if you had magic, I'm pretty sure you'd make him disappear." While critics feared that the song would underperform due to its strong suggestive male–bashing content, Mo clarified that the song was just in reference to specific men who often rely on women then turn around and cheat on them, thus men like that "had to go."

== Critical reception ==
The song met generally favorable reviews from music critics. During its radio run, DJ Boogie from Pittsburgh radio station WAMO noted that the reception was "more positive than negative," and added, "The females especially have been feeling it." Chuck Taylor from Billboard magazine dubbed the song "[a] tale that hit home," with Lil' Mo's "young-leaning demographic"–based audience. Elysa Gardner from Vibe magazine cited the song as a "slamming single" that "tells off a wayward lover." AllMusic editor Dan LeRoy also praised the track's lyrical content for its "stunning, bitter kiss-off" synopsis.

== Music video ==
A music video for the single was directed by Dave Meyers and premiered on BET and The Box on April 15, 2000. Following its premiere, the video became a favorite amongst musical peers like hip-hop musician Jay-Z, who was so intrigued with Mo's "ghetto" style that he requested her to be a feature on his song "Parking Lot Pimpin'."

== Track listings ==
CD single

1. "Ta Da" (LP Version)
2. "My Story" (Snippet)
3. "Starstruck" (featuring Missy "Misdemeanor" Elliott) (Snippet)
4. "Saturday" (Snippet)

12" vinyl

1. "Ta Da" (LP Version)
2. "Ta Da" (Radio Edit)
3. "Ta Da" (Instrumental)
4. "Ta Da" (Acapella)

== Charts ==
Weekly chart performance for "Ta Da"
Chart (2000)	Peak position
US Billboard Hot 100	95
US Hot R&B Airplay (Billboard)	65
US Hot R&B/Hip-Hop Singles & Tracks (Billboard)	21

== Release history ==
"Ta Da" release history
Region	Date	Format	Ref(s)
United States	April 10, 2000	Radio airplay	
United States	June 13, 2000	CD single; 12" vinyl	
United States	July 18, 2000	CD; cassette tape	
United Kingdom	October 27, 2000	CD single	
