= Meet the Girl Next Door =

Studio album by Lil' Mo
- Released: April 29, 2003
- Recorded: 2002–2003
- Length: 56:06
- Label: Elektra; WEA
- Producer: Amadeus; Bastiany; Bryan-Michael Cox; Warryn Campbell; Missy Elliott; Heavy D; Lil' Mo; Craig Love; Walter Millsap III; Precision; Chucky Thompson

Lil' Mo chronology
| Based on a True Story (2001) | Meet the Girl Next Door (2003) | Pain & Paper (2007) |

Singles from Meet the Girl Next Door
- 1. "4Ever" Released: February 18, 2003; 2. "Ten Commandments" Released: October 25, 2003

Meet the Girl Next Door is the second studio album by American singer Lil' Mo. It was released on April 29, 2003 by Elektra Records. Written and recorded during her eighth-month pregnancy break in which she became a part-time anchor for Baltimore urban radio station WXYV-FM's The Lil' Mo Show, Lil' Mo worked with a variety of producers on the album, including Missy Elliott, Walter "Lil' Walt" Millsap III, Chucky Thompson, Bryan-Michael Cox, Craig Love, Warryn Campbell, Dwayne Bastiany, and Precision. Guest vocalists on Meet the Girl Next Door include rappers Fabolous, Free, and Lil' Kim.

The album was released to favorable reviews and mild charting on the US Billboard 200, reaching number 17, while entering the Top R&B/Hip-Hop Albums top five. Promotion for the album was limited; according to Lil' Mo, this was largely due to the fact that she was pregnant and Elektra did not give her proper support. Despite minimal promotion, Mo went on to perform the album singles on very few shows, including Jimmy Kimmel Live! and Soul Train. The album generated three singles, "4Ever", "21 Answers" and "Ten Commandments". Meet the Girl Next Door was her last album produced under Elektra Records.

== Background ==
In 2001, following several delays, Elektra Records released Lil' Mo's debut album Based on a True Story. The album debuted and peaked at number 14 on the US Billboard 200, selling 73,000 copies in its first week, and produced the hit single "Superwoman Pt. II" featuring rapper Fabolous, which reached number 11 on the US Billboard Hot 100 and entered the top five of the Hot R&B/Hip-Hop Songs. In early 2002, she found out that she was pregnant with her first child. While she was expecting a negative response from her label, Elektra embraced the news and encouraged her to start work on her second album during her pregnancy. As a result, Lil' Mo resigned from touring and became a part-time anchor for Baltimore urban radio station WXYV-FM for the next seven months. In the meantime, she appeared on rapper Angie Martinez's top 20 single "If I Could Go!" and spent four months writing and recording Meet the Girl Next Door. In a 2003 interview with Billboard magazine she elaborated that she decided to work with producers that "didn't get the credit they deserved" and she was going to purposely use a different sound for the effort in hopes of convincing the public to overlook her credibility for "Superwoman Pt. II".

== Promotion ==
The album produced several singles. In February 2003, "4Ever", another collaboration with Fabolous, was released as a lead single for the album, and received somewhat lukewarm reviews by most critics. The song peaked at number 37 on Billboard Hot 100 and at number 13 on he Hot R&B/Hip-Hop Songs. "Ten Commandments" featuring Lil' Kim was slated to follow as the second single; however, due to limited promotion, the single was never properly released. It however, peaked at number one at the Bubbling Under R&B/Hip-Hop Singles chart. "21 Answers", a known response to 50 Cent's song "21 Questions", was sent to radio in May 2003 as a promotional single.

== Critical reception ==
Professional ratings
Review scores
| Source | Rating |
|---|---|
| AllMusic | 4/5 stars |

Reviews for the album were mostly positive. Meet the Girl Next Door was rated four of five stars by AllMusic editor Andy Kellman, who described Mo's voice more "rangy" and "versatile." He also stated that the album had terrific highlights, as well as more better lyrics than her debut. However, he described the album being, "four songs too long." He also stated that "it's apparent that Lil' Mo really ought to devote the bulk of her working time — if not all of it — to making music." S. Tia Brown from Entertainment Weekly found that "with her sophomore effort, Meet the Girl Next Door, Lil’ Mo solidifies her brand – a hybrid of street sassiness and mature lyrics set to waist-swaying melodies. The new wife and mother soulfully belts misty-eyed ballads and R&B remakes without resorting to cliches and slang to express her take on love." Billboard remarked: "A merging of traditional R&B and hip-hop, Meet the Girl Next Door showcases a depper, more lyrical frank Lil' Mo who definitely still has the chops [...] However, the set is ultimately weighed down by unnecessary interludes and a formulaic sameness to several of the songs."

== Commercial performance ==
Meet the Girl Next Door debuted and peaked at number 17 on the US Billboard 200, selling 53,000 copies in its first week. It was a considerable decline from Lil' Mo's previous effort Based on a True Story, which had opened to sales of 73,000 units in 2001. On Billboard's component charts, it reached number four on the Top R&B/Hip-Hop Albums chart, becoming her first solo top five entry on any chart. Billboard ranked the album 99th on its 2003 Top R&B/Hip-Hop Albums year-end listing.

== Track listing ==
Meet the Girl Next Door track listing
| No. | Title | Writer(s) | Producer(s) | Length |
|---|---|---|---|---|
| 1. | "Intro" | Cynthia Loving | Lil' Mo | 1:18 |
| 2. | "Why Do We Fall in Love" | Loving; Larry Gates | Precision | 3:43 |
| 3. | "Doing Me Wrong" | Missy Elliott; Walter Millsap III; Erick Walls | Elliott; Millsap | 4:16 |
| 4. | "4Ever" (featuring Fabolous) | Loving; Bryan-Michael Cox; Craig Love; John Jackson | Cox; Love^{[a]} | 4:30 |
| 5. | "Ten Commandments" (featuring Lil' Kim) | Loving; Chucky Thompson; Kimberly Jones | Thompson | 5:05 |
| 6. | "Ain't No Reason" | Loving; Dwight Myers; Gates | Precision; Heavy D^{[a]} | 3:32 |
| 7. | "Heaven (Interlude)" | Loving; Warryn Campbell | Campbell | 1:54 |
| 8. | "Brand Nu" | Loving; Antwan "Amadeus" Thompson | Thompson | 4:25 |
| 9. | "1st Time" | Loving; Dwayne Bastiany | Bastiany | 4:24 |
| 10. | "So Lost Without You" | Loving; Bastiany | Bastiany | 4:00 |
| 11. | "Shoulda Known" | Loving; Thompson | Thompson | 5:32 |
| 12. | "Disturbing Phone Call (Interlude)" | Loving | Lil' Mo | 1:22 |
| 13. | "Get Over It" | Loving; Bastiany | Bastiany | 3:30 |
| 14. | "It's Your World" | Loving; Bastiany | Bastiany | 4:02 |
| 15. | "Letter From My #1 Fan (Interlude)" | Loving | Lil' Mo | 0:32 |
| 16. | "Letter From My #1 Fan" | Loving; Thompson | Thompson | 4:27 |
| Total length: | | | | 56:06 |

2011 re-release bonus track
| No. | Title | Writer(s) | Producer(s) | Length |
|---|---|---|---|---|
| 17. | "21 Answers" (featuring Free) | Loving; Kevin Risto | Dirty Swift | 3:28 |
| 18. | "4Ever (Midi Mafia Reggae Remix)" | Loving; Cox; Love; Jackson | Midi Mafia | 4:27 |

Notes

- ^{^a} signifies a co-producer

Sample credits

- "Ten Commandments" contains a sample from "Ten Crack Commandments", performed by The Notorious B.I.G.
- "Heaven (Interlude)" contains excerpts from "Love Is Watching You", written and performed by Peabo Bryson.

== Personnel ==
Credits adapted from the liner notes of Meet the Girl Next Door.

- Dwayne Bastiany – producer
- Charles "El Loco" Bedoya – engineer
- Kalixto Blount – hair stylist
- Merlin Bobb – A&R, executive producer
- Jay Brown – A&R, executive producer
- Sandra Campbell – project coordinator
- Candice Childress – project coordinator
- Sherry Clardy – artist coordination
- Steve Conover – assistant
- Bryan-Michael Cox – instrumentation, producer
- DJ Premier – producer
- Missy Elliott – producer
- Fabolous – vocals
- Mike Ging – engineer
- Heavy D – producer
- Jean-Marie Horvat – mixing
- J.J. Jackson – composer
- Andre Johnson – artist coordination
- Claudine Joseph – project manager
- Rich Keller – mixing
- Lil' Kim – vocals
- C.P. Love – vocals
- Craig Love – composer
- Anthony Mandler – photography
- Glen Marchese – mixing
- Manny Marroquin – mixing
- Ann Mincieli – assistant engineer
- Celeste Moses – artist coordination
- Tim Olmstead – mixing assistant
- Brian Stanley – engineer
- Nate Thelen – engineer
- A.P. Thompson – composer
- Chucky Thompson – mixing
- Patrick Viala – engineer

== Charts ==
=== Weekly charts ===
Weekly chart performance for Meet the Girl Next Door
| Chart (2003) | Peak position |
|---|---|
| US Billboard 200 | 17 |
| US Top R&B/Hip-Hop Albums (Billboard) | 4 |

=== Year-end charts ===
Year-end chart performance for Meet the Girl Next Door
| Chart (2003) | Position |
|---|---|
| US Top R&B/Hip-Hop Albums (Billboard) | 99 |
