= I Want You Back (Mel B song) =

1998 single by Melanie B

Single by Melanie B featuring Missy Elliott

from the album Why Do Fools Fall in Love and Hot
- Released: 14 September 1998
- Recorded: 21–24 June 1998
- Genre: R&B; hip-hop
- Length: 3:26 (radio edit); 3:51 (soundtrack version)
- Label: Virgin
- Songwriters: Melissa Elliott; Gerard Thomas; Donald Holmes
- Producer: Missy Elliott

Melanie B singles chronology
"I Want You Back" (1998)	"Word Up!" (1999)

Missy Elliott singles chronology
"5 Minutes" (1998)	"I Want You Back" (1998)	"Trippin'" (1998)

Music video
- "I Want You Back" on YouTube

"I Want You Back" is a song by British singer Melanie B featuring American rapper Missy "Misdemeanor" Elliott. It was released from the soundtrack to the 1998 film Why Do Fools Fall in Love. After two years, the song was also included on Melanie B's debut album, Hot (2000). Serving as Melanie B's debut single outside the Spice Girls, "I Want You Back" topped the UK Singles Chart on 20 September 1998.

== Background ==
Melanie B recalled, "This was the first time I'd even considered doing anything by myself. I was on tour with the Spice Girls when Missy "Misdemeanor" Elliott called me up and said 'Melanie, I've got a song for you, will you come and record it with me?' I checked it with the girls and within a month I was out there, I recorded it in a day, did the video, then came back. She's a genius!"

== Music video ==
The video was directed by Hype Williams. The video uses the radio edit version of the song and the cover for the single is a still from the music video. The entire video is show with a green hue on screen with occasional use of red and blue, the video starts with Melanie and Missy singing the intro and as the first verse starts, Melanie is seen with her then-fiancée, Jimmy Gulzar, as she smacks, hits and teases him. Melanie is pregnant in the video. In the second verse Melanie is seen crawling on a table to meet Jimmy at the end for more teasing, wearing Gene Simmons-esque make-up. As the bridge comes on, Melanie is seen in a cage with Jimmy high in the air. Shots of Melanie, Missy, and back up dancers in cowboy hats are seen dancing as the video ends.

== Track listings ==
UK CD and cassette single; Australian CD single

1. "I Want You Back" (radio edit) – 3:25
2. "I Want You Back" (soundtrack version) – 3:51
3. "I Want You Back" (MAW remix) – 8:22

UK 12-inch single

A1. "I Want You Back" (MAW remix) – 8:22
B1. "I Want You Back" (deep dub) – 8:17
B2. "I Want You Back" (soundtrack version) – 3:51

European CD single

1. "I Want You Back" (radio edit) – 3:25
2. "I Want You Back" (instrumental) – 3:52

== Charts ==
=== Weekly charts ===
Chart (1998)	Peak position
Australia (ARIA)	12
Belgium (Ultratop 50 Flanders)	24
Belgium (Ultratop 50 Wallonia)	10
Europe (Eurochart Hot 100)	13
France (SNEP)	56
Germany (GfK)	37
Ireland (IRMA)	6
Netherlands (Dutch Top 40)	6
Netherlands (Single Top 100)	6
New Zealand (Recorded Music NZ)	20
Scottish Singles Sales (Official Charts)	6
Sweden (Sverigetopplistan)	21
Switzerland (Schweizer Hitparade)	25
UK Singles (Official Charts)	1
UK Dance (Official Charts)	3
UK Hip Hop/R&B (Official Charts)	1

=== Year-end charts ===
Chart (1998)	Position
Belgium (Ultratop 50 Wallonia)	87
Netherlands (Dutch Top 40)	72
Netherlands (Single Top 100)	75
UK Singles (OCC)	82

== Certifications ==
Region	Certification	Certified units/sales
United Kingdom (BPI)	Silver	230,000

== Release history ==
Region	Date	Format(s)	Label(s)	Ref.
United States	21 July 1998	Rhythmic contemporary radio	Virgin	
United Kingdom	14 September 1998	12-inch vinyl; CD; cassette	Virgin	
