= Venni Vetti Vecci =

Studio album by Ja Rule
- Released: June 1, 1999
- Recorded: 1998–1999
- Studio: Electric Lady Studios (New York City, New York)
- Genres: East Coast hip hop; gangsta rap
- Length: 76:17
- Labels: Murder Inc.; Def Jam 2000; Rush Associated Labels
- Producers: Irv Gotti (also exec.); Tyrone Fyffe; Lil Rob; Erick Sermon; Tai; Self Service; DL

Ja Rule chronology
Venni Vetti Vecci (1999)	Rule 3:36 (2000)

Singles from Venni Vetti Vecci
- 1. "Holla Holla" Released: March 2, 1999

Venni Vetti Vecci is the debut studio album by American rapper Ja Rule, released on June 1, 1999 by Def Jam Recordings and Irv Gotti's Murder Inc. Records as the latter label's inaugural release. Production was mostly handled by Irv Gotti (who also executive produced the album), with additional work provided by Lil Rob, Ty Fyffe, Erick Sermon and Self Service. The album features guest appearances from Jay-Z, DMX, Case, Memphis Bleek, Black Child, Ronald Isley and Erick Sermon among others, and its title alludes to the Latin phrase "veni, vidi, vici", meaning "I came, I saw, I conquered".

Venni Vetti Vecci debuted at number three on the US Billboard 200, selling 184,000 copies in its first week. The album was supported by one successful single, "Holla Holla," which peaked at number 35 on the US Billboard Hot 100 singles chart. A music video was shot for the album track "Daddy's Little Baby" and was released.

== Background ==
In 1995, Ja Rule was one of the first artists to be featured on Mic Geronimo's "Time to Build". He then formed a group named "Cash Money Click" with his friends, which then signed a deal with TVT Records, under which they recorded two albums and released one single before being dropped from the label. Ja Rule later called it a "bullshit deal" as TVT withheld the publishing royalties of the recorded material. Irv Gotti was hired as an A&R while working as an executive producer for Def Jam, and convinced Ja Rule to sign a deal with the label.

Russell Simmons later allowed Gotti to have his own record label. Irv co-founded Murder Inc. Records and promoted Ja Rule, placing him on songs amongst rappers Jay-Z, LL Cool J, DMX, Method Man and Redman. Due to Ja Rule's exceptional performances on these songs, representatives from Def Jam gave his debut album a release date.

=== Music ===
The track titled "Only Begotten Son" alludes to the biblical verses John 3:16 and John 3:18, signifying "the father so feared the world that he left his only begotten son, in order to show that pain is love".

=== Artwork ===
The album cover of Venni Vetti Vecci features Ja Rule with his head turned upward, eyes closed and hands clasped together, standing in front of the statue of Christ the Redeemer. It has been interpreted as referring to the "only begotten son" metaphor.

== Critical reception ==
Professional ratings
Review scores
Source	Rating
AllMusic	2.5/5 stars
Los Angeles Times	2.5/4 stars
RapReviews	6/10
Rolling Stone	3/5 stars
Rolling Stone Album Guide	3/5 stars
The Source	3.5/5 stars

Upon its release, Venni Vetti Vecci received generally mixed reviews. Ja Rule received several comparisons to fellow rappers Tupac Shakur and DMX. Los Angeles Times critic Soren Baker noted that "on his debut, Ja Rule sticks largely to current rap lyric staples –confrontational rhymes about the inferiority of other rappers and his own sexual prowess [...] Producers Irv Gotti, Self, Tyrone Fyffe and others keep their beats spare, with pounding drums, undulating bass lines and wicked synthesizer tweaks serving as the foundation for soundscapes that contain as much bounce as bite."

AllMusic editor Stephen Thomas Erlewine found that Venni Vetti Vecci "isn't the stunner some may have expected, but it nevertheless is a strong opening salvo. Ja Rule doesn't bend the rules of East Coast hardcore hip-hop enough to truly distinguish himself, but he does deliver a solid record, filled with tough party jams and good straight-ahead gangsta. If the record runs a little long, it nevertheless has enough fine moments to make this a promising debut." Writing for Vibe, Shaheem Reid felt that the majority of the album was "hampered by colorless production", stating that Ja Rule "desperately needs tighter tracks to complement his MC skills".

== Commercial performance ==
Venni Vetti Vecci debuted and peaked at number three on the US Billboard 200 and at number one on the Top R&B/Hip-Hop Albums chart, selling 184,000 copies in its first week. It was eventually certified platinum by the Recording Industry Association of America (RIAA) on July 12, 1999. By November 2002, the album had sold over 1.8 million copies in the US and 2.5 million copies worldwide.

== Legacy ==
Ja Rule became one of the biggest hip hop stars of the late 1990s, along with Jay-Z and DMX, whose respective albums Vol. 2... Hard Knock Life and It's Dark and Hell Is Hot gained notoriety and multi-platinum sales. Because of these albums, Ja Rule was able to tour with these artists as they formed a group titled Murder Inc., who fittingly signed to Murder Inc. and Def Jam. He was an opening act for them on their 1998 "Hard Knock Life" tour, along with Memphis Bleek.

== Track listing ==
Venni Vetti Vecci track listing
No.	Title	Writer(s)	Producer(s)	Length
1.	"The March Prelude"		Irv Gotti	1:19
2.	"We Here Now" (featuring Black Child)	Jeffrey Atkins; Irving Lorenzo; Robert Mays; Ramel Gill	Irv Gotti; Lil' Rob	3:25
3.	"World's Most Dangerous" (featuring Nemesis)	Atkins; Tyrone Fyffe; Lorenzo; Otha Miller	Tyrone Fyffe; Irv Gotti; Lil' Rob	5:07
4.	"Let's Ride"	Atkins; Lorenzo; Mays	Irv Gotti; Lil' Rob	4:22
5.	"Holla Holla"	Atkins; Taiwan Green; Lorenzo	Tai; Irv Gotti	4:24
6.	"Kill 'Em All" (featuring Jay-Z)	Atkins; Lorenzo; Edward Hinson; Shawn Carter	Self; Irv Gotti^{[a]}	4:17
7.	"I Hate Nigguz (Skit)"			1:06
8.	"Nigguz Theme"	Atkins; Lorenzo; Mays	Irv Gotti; Lil' Rob	4:09
9.	"Suicide Freestyle" (featuring Case)	Atkins; Lorenzo; Robert Kelly	Irv Gotti	2:16
10.	"Story to Tell"	Atkins; Lorenzo; Mays	Irv Gotti; Lil' Rob	4:05
11.	"Chris Black (Skit)"			1:40
12.	"Count on Yo Nigga"	Atkins; Lorenzo; Mays	Irv Gotti; Lil' Rob	4:35
13.	"It's Murda" (featuring DMX and Jay-Z)	Atkins; Fyffe; Earl Simmons; Carter	Tyrone Fyffe; Irv Gotti^{[a]}; Richard "Love" Marshall^{[a]}	3:36
14.	"E-Dub and Ja" (featuring Erick Sermon)	Atkins; Erick Sermon; Lorenzo	Erick Sermon; Irv Gotti	4:14
15.	"187 Murda Baptiss Church (Skit)"			2:48
16.	"Murda 4 Life" (featuring Memphis Bleek)	Atkins; Green; Lorenzo; Malik Cox	Tai; Irv Gotti	4:48
17.	"Daddy's Little Baby" (featuring Ronald Isley)	Atkins; Lorenzo; Hinson; Rudolph Isley; Marvin Isley; Ronald Isley; O'Kelly Isley Jr.; Ernie Isley; Chris Jasper	Self; Irv Gotti^{[a]}	5:20
18.	"Race Against Time"	Atkins; Lorenzo; Mays	Irv Gotti; Lil' Rob	4:43
19.	"Only Begotten Son"	Atkins; Fyffe; Lorenzo; Mays	Tyrone Fyffe; Irv Gotti; Lil' Rob	4:55
20.	"The Murderers" (featuring Black Child and Tah Murdah)	Atkins; Lorenzo; Larry Ogletree; Gill; Taheem Crocker	DL; Irv Gotti	5:08
Total length:				76:17

Notes

- ^{^[a]} signifies co-producer(s)

Sample credits

- "Suicide Freestyle" contains a sample from "Suicide", written and performed by R. Kelly.
- "Daddy's Little Baby" contains an interpolation of "Voyage to Atlantis", written by Rudolph Isley, Marvin Isley, Ronald Isley, O'Kelly Isley Jr., Ernie Isley, and Chris Jasper.

== Personnel ==
Credits adapted from the album's liner notes.

- Bob Brown – assistant mix engineer (17, 18)
- Case – background vocals (8)
- Black Child – additional vocals (2, 8)
- Tom Coyne – mastering
- Glen E. Friedman – photography
- Irv Gotti – executive producer, mixing (2–6, 8–10, 12–14, 16–20)
- Ken Duro Ifill – mixing (2–6, 8–10, 12–14, 16–20)
- Lil' Rob – instrumentation (1–4, 6–13, 15, 17–20)
- Jonathan Mannion – photography
- Erick Sermon – instrumentation (14)
- Tai – instrumentation (5, 16)
- Tommy Uzzo – engineer (14)
- Pat Viala – engineer (2–6, 8–10, 12, 13, 16–20), mixing (16)

== Charts ==
=== Weekly charts ===
Weekly chart performance for Venni Vetti Vecci
Chart (1999)	Peak position
Canadian Albums (Billboard)	20
UK R&B Albums (Official Charts)	17
US Billboard 200	3
US Top R&B/Hip-Hop Albums (Billboard)	1

=== Year-end charts ===
Year-end chart performance for Venni Vetti Vecci
Chart (1999)	Position
US Billboard 200	74
US Top R&B/Hip-Hop Albums (Billboard)	27

== Certifications ==
Certifications for Venni Vetti Vecci
Region	Certification	Certified units/sales
United States (RIAA)	Platinum	1,000,000^{^}
^{^} Shipments figures based on certification alone.

== See also ==
- List of number-one R&B albums of 1999 (U.S.)
