= Why Do Fools Fall in Love (film) =

1998 film by Gregory Nava

- Theatrical release poster
- Directed by: Gregory Nava
- Screenplay by: Tina Andrews
- Produced by: Paul Hall; Stephen Nemeth
- Starring: Halle Berry; Vivica A. Fox; Lela Rochon; Larenz Tate; Little Richard
- Cinematography: Edward Lachman
- Edited by: Nancy Richardson
- Music by: Stephen James Taylor
- Production company: Rhino Films
- Distributed by: Warner Bros.
- Release date: August 28, 1998
- Running time: 116 minutes
- Country: United States
- Language: English
- Box office: $12,461,773

Why Do Fools Fall in Love is a 1998 American biographical drama film directed by Gregory Nava. Released by Warner Bros., it is based on the true story of Frankie Lymon, the lead singer of the pioneering rock and roll group The Teenagers for one year. Moreover, the film highlights the three women in his life, each of whom claims to have married Lymon and lay claim to his estate.

Written by Tina Andrews, Why Do Fools Fall in Love stars Halle Berry, Vivica A. Fox, Lela Rochon, and Larenz Tate, who portrays Lymon. Little Richard also appears in the film as himself.

"I Want You Back", one of the singles from the soundtrack, by Melanie Brown featuring Missy Elliott, peaked at number one on the UK Singles Chart.

== Plot ==
Lymon was aged 13 when the teenage group Frankie Lymon & the Teenagers erupted from radios and jukeboxes with their 1956 hit "Why Do Fools Fall in Love?" and appeared in the movie Rock, Rock, Rock! (1956).

After Mr. Rock and Roll (1957), Lymon started a solo singing career, but success quickly tapered off. Lymon's career was essentially over by the time he was aged 18, and he died of a heroin overdose seven years later.

Jumping between the 1950s–1960s and the 1980s, the film traces the rise and fall of Lymon (Larenz Tate) in a series of flashbacks, as courtroom claims on Lymon's royalties are outlined by three women: Zola Taylor (Halle Berry) of the R&B vocal group The Platters; Elizabeth Waters (Vivica A. Fox), a petty thief from Philadelphia; and Emira Eagle (Lela Rochon), a schoolteacher from Augusta, GA. The end credits show archival footage of the real Frankie Lymon performing his 1958 solo single "Goody Goody".

Little Richard also makes a courtroom appearance, and Miguel A. Nunez Jr. portrays Little Richard in scenes set in the 1950s.

The film ends with Emira winning Lymon's estate.

== Cast ==
- Halle Berry as Zola Taylor
- Vivica A. Fox as Elizabeth "Mickey" Waters
- Lela Rochon as Emira Eagle
- Larenz Tate as Frankie Lymon
- Paul Mazursky as Morris Levy
- Pamela Reed as Judge Lambrey
- Alexis Cruz as Herman Santiago
- Jon Huertas as Joe Negroni
- David Barry Gray as Peter Markowitz
- Miguel A. Nunez Jr. as Young Little Richard
- Clifton Powell as Lawrence Roberts
- Lane Smith as Ezra Grahme
- Ben Vereen as Richard Barrett
- Paula Jai Parker as Paula King
- Marcello Thedford as Drug Dealer
- Norris Young as Jimmy
- Little Richard as himself
- Aries Spears as Redd Foxx
- J. August Richards as Sherman
- Shirley Caesar as minister/singer at funeral

== Background ==
The screenplay of the film, written by actress-turned-screenwriter Tina Andrews, took 15 years to be produced. Director Gregory Nava used most of the technical staff from his prior film Selena.

=== Filming locations ===
Filming locations include Jacksonville, Florida; Los Angeles; and Starke, Florida.

=== Distribution ===
The film was first presented at the Urbanworld Film Festival on August 8, 1998. The film opened in wide release on August 28, 1998 (1,369 theaters), and sales on the opening weekend were $3,946,382. Why Do Fools Fall in Love ran for eight weeks and eventually grossed $12,506,676 in the United States. At its widest release, the film was shown in 1,377 screens.

== Reception ==
=== Critical response ===
On the review aggregator website Rotten Tomatoes, 52% of 58 critics' reviews are positive, with an average rating of 5.9/10. The website's consensus reads: "This is a fun comedy with delightful musical numbers." Roger Ebert was disappointed in the screenplay and ultimately Nava's direction of the film, and wrote: "There are several angles this material might have been approached from, and director Gregory Nava tries several without hitting on one that works. By the end of the film, we're not even left with anyone to root for; we realize with a little astonishment, waiting for the court verdict, that we don't care who wins."

Film critic Peter Stack liked the film, believing that director Nava smartly juggles a lot of elements in the picture. Stack wrote: "Why Do Fools Fall in Love is a fresh, enlightening example of how to take a tragic American show-business story and make it funny, warm and terrifically entertaining...[it] brims with joyful spirit and raucous comedy...[and the film] deftly juggles a surprising number of elements, but they all work."

=== Accolades ===
Wins

- ALMA Award: Outstanding Latino Director of a Feature Film, Gregory Nava, 1999
- American Black Film Festival: Black Film Award; Best Actor, Larenz Tate, 1999

Nominations

- ALMA Awards: Outstanding Actor in a Feature Film in a Crossover Role, Miguel A. Núñez Jr.; Outstanding Actor in a Supporting Role in a Feature Film, Alexis Cruz, 1999
- American Black Film Festival: Black Film Award; Best Screenplay, Tina Andrews; Best Soundtrack, 1999

== Soundtrack ==
Why Do Fools Fall in Love

Soundtrack album by Various artists
- Released: September 8, 1998
- Recorded: 1998
- Genres: Hip hop, R&B
- Labels: Goldmind; East West; Elektra; Warner Sunset
- Producers: Missy "Misdemeanor" Elliott, Timbaland, Big Baby, Suga Mike, Gerard Thomas, Donald "Lenny" Holmes, Anthony Dent, Brian Alexander Morgan, Kay Gee, Darren Lighty, Keri "K.L." Lewis

Singles from Why Do Fools Fall in Love
- 1. "5 Minutes" Released: June 29, 1998; 2. "No Fool, No More" Released: September 22, 1998; 3. "Get on the Bus" Released: September 29, 1998; 4. "I Want You Back" Released: October 13, 1998

Professional ratings
Review scores
Source	Rating
AllMusic	3/5 stars

Two soundtrack albums were released for Why Do Fools Fall in Love by Warner Music Group. Why Do Fools Fall in Love: Original Versions from the Movie, released on September 8, 1998, by Rhino Records, contained 14 songs, including five of Frankie Lymon & the Teenagers' original recordings. Also included are original hits by Little Richard, The Platters, The Shirelles, Otis Redding and others.

Why Do Fools Fall in Love: Music from and Inspired by the Motion Picture was released on the same day as Original Versions from the Movie, but on Warner's East West Records label in conjunction with Elektra Records and The Goldmind Inc. Save for one vintage Little Richard song, it features new hip-hop and contemporary R&B recordings practically unrelated to the actual film (one track, Gina Thompson's "Why Do Fools Fall in Love", interpolates the Teenagers' hit and is featured over the film's end credits). Produced by Missy "Misdemeanor" Elliott and Timbaland, the soundtrack album features songs by artists such as Elliott, Busta Rhymes, En Vogue, Destiny's Child, Coko of SWV, and Melanie Brown.

It peaked at number 55 on the Billboard 200 and number 15 on the Top R&B/Hip-Hop Albums and spawned the singles "I Want You Back" by Melanie Brown featuring Missy "Misdemeanor" Elliott (which peaked at number one on the UK Singles Chart), En Vogue's "No Fool No More" (which peaked at number 57 on the Billboard Hot 100), and Destiny's Child's "Get on the Bus" (which peaked at number 15 on the UK Singles Chart). Singer Lil' Mo also made her debut with the single and music video for "Five Minutes".

=== Track listing ===
Why Do Fools Fall in Love: Music from and Inspired by the Motion Picture
No.	Title	Performer(s)	Length
1.	"Why Do Fools Fall in Love"	Gina Thompson featuring Mocha	4:09
2.	"Get on the Bus"	Destiny's Child featuring Timbaland	4:46
3.	"He Be Back"	Coko featuring Missy "Misdemeanor" Elliott	4:53
4.	"No Fool, No More"	En Vogue	4:17
5.	"Get Contact"	Missy "Misdemeanor" Elliott & Busta Rhymes	3:31
6.	"Five Minutes"	Lil' Mo featuring Missy "Misdemeanor" Elliott	5:25
7.	"I Want You Back"	Melanie B featuring Missy "Misdemeanor" Elliott	3:53
8.	"About You"	Mista	5:13
9.	"Love Is for Fools"	Mint Condition	3:51
10.	"Without You"	Nicole Wray	4:22
11.	"Splash"	Next	5:09
12.	"What the Dealio"	Total featuring Missy "Misdemeanor" Elliott	4:01
13.	"Crazy Love"	Envyi featuring Baby Sham of the Flipmode Squad	4:00
14.	"Keep a Knockin'"	Little Richard	5:33

Why Do Fools Fall in Love: Original Versions from the Movie
No.	Title	Performer(s)	Length
1.	"Why Do Fools Fall in Love"	The Teenagers	2:19
2.	"Tutti Fruitti"	Little Richard	2:24
3.	"The Great Pretender"	The Platters	2:41
4.	"Baby, Baby"	Frankie Lymon & The Teenagers	2:08
5.	"Long Lonely Nights"	Clyde McPhatter	2:27
6.	"Smoke Gets in Your Eyes"	The Platters	2:40
7.	"Little Bitty Pretty One"	Frankie Lymon	2:43
8.	"California Dreamin'"	The Mamas and the Papas	2:39
9.	"All Day and All of the Night"	The Kinks	2:24
10.	"The ABC's of Love"	Frankie Lymon & The Teenagers	1:58
11.	"Will You Love Me Tomorrow"	The Shirelles	2:43
12.	"Try a Little Tenderness"	Otis Redding	3:49
13.	"California Dreaming"	Bobby Womack	3:23
14.	"Goody Goody"	Frankie Lymon	2:11
