= 4Ever (Lil' Mo song) =

Single by Lil' Mo featuring Fabolous

from the album Meet the Girl Next Door
- Released: February 18, 2003
- Recorded: 2002
- Studio: Quad Recording (New York, NY)
- Genre: R&B
- Length: 4:31
- Label: Elektra
- Songwriters: Cynthia Loving; Bryan-Michael Cox; Craig Love; John Jackson
- Producers: Cox; Love

Lil' Mo singles chronology
"If I Could Go!" (2002)	"4Ever" (2003)	"Ten Commandments" (2003)

Fabolous singles chronology
"Trade It All" (2002)	"4Ever" (2003)	"Can't Let You Go" (2003)

"4Ever" is a song by American singer Lil' Mo. It was written by Lil' Mo along with Bryan-Michael Cox, Craig Love, and Fabolous for her second album, Meet the Girl Next Door (2003), while production was helmed by Cox and Love. Prior to its official physical release, the song was serviced to radio stations through airplay in early December 2002. Upon its release, critics referred to the single as an "uptempo wedding" ode. In the United States, it reached number 37 on the US Billboard Hot 100.

== Music video ==
On January 19, 2003, a two-day filming shoot began for the music video of "4Ever", which was directed by Benny Boom in Brooklyn, New York. The video initially premiered on BET in late February 2003.

The synopsis of the video focuses on Lil' Mo's reminiscent memories of her boyfriend as she climbs the stairs of an apartment. Each step she takes, Mo receives a flashback, one of which of course features Fabolous.

== Track listings and formats ==
CD single

1. "4 Ever" (Album Version) (featuring Fabolous) — 4:34
2. "4 Ever" (Album Version w/ No Intro) (featuring Fabolous) — 3:55
3. "4 Ever" (No Rap Version w/ Intro) — 4:34
4. "4 Ever" (No Rap Version w/ No Intro) — 3:55
5. "4 Ever" (Instrumental) — 4:34
6. "4 Ever" (TV Track) (featuring Fabolous) — 4:34
7. "4 Ever" (A Cappella) (featuring Fabolous) — 4:30

12" vinyl

1. "4 Ever" (Album Version)
2. "4 Ever" (Album Version) (No Intro)
3. "4 Ever" (No Rap Version w/ Intro)
4. "4 Ever" (No Rap Version) (No Intro)
5. "Ten Commandments" (Amended Version) (featuring Lil' Kim)
6. "Ten Commandments" (Instrumental)
7. "4 Ever" (Instrumental)
8. "4 Ever" (Acappella)

Remix vinyl

1. "4Ever" (Midi Mafia Remix) (featuring Baby Cham)
2. "4Ever" (Midi Mafia Remix) (Instrumental)
3. "4Ever" (Midi Mafia Remix) (Acappella) (featuring Baby Cham)
4. "21 Answers" (featuring Free)

== Charts ==
=== Weekly charts ===
Chart (2003)	Peak position
US Billboard Hot 100	37
US Hot R&B/Hip-Hop Songs (Billboard)	13
US Rhythmic Airplay (Billboard)	24

=== Year-end charts ===
Chart (2003)	Position
US Hot R&B/Hip-Hop Songs (Billboard)	55
