= Ten Commandments (song) =

Single by Lil' Mo featuring Lil' Kim

Single by Lil' Mo featuring Lil' Kim

from the album Meet the Girl Next Door
- Released: October 25, 2002 (radio airplay); March 4, 2003 (12" vinyl)
- Recorded: 2002
- Studio: Quad Recording (New York, NY)
- Genre: R&B; hip hop
- Length: 5:03
- Label: Elektra
- Songwriter(s): C. Loving, C. Thompson, K. Jones
- Producer(s): Chucky Thompson

Lil' Mo singles chronology
"4Ever" (2003)	"Ten Commandments" (2002)	"Can't Let You Go" (2003)

Lil' Kim singles chronology
"The Jump Off" (2003)	"Ten Commandments" (2003)	"Magic Stick" (2003)

"Ten Commandments" is a hip hop song by Lil' Mo featuring Grammy Award–winning rapper Lil' Kim from the former's sophomore effort, Meet the Girl Next Door (2003). Although Elektra Records had announced in December 2002 that the song would be released as Meet the Girl Next Door's second single, plans for the release never followed resulting in a promotional "street" release a month prior to the release of Meet the Girl Next Door.

== Background ==
The song features a distinctive sample of The Notorious B.I.G.'s "10 Crack Commandments," featuring production by DJ Premier. The Biggie sample was also used in reference for Lil' Kim's feature, much similar to another single ("Let It Go") which would follow the same concept four years later. When asked on the meaning of the song, Lil' Mo told MTV News: "...[It was] to let [ladies] know how to keep your man. Stop telling all your homegirls all your business and problems. The ones that be like, 'Girl, he ain't no good' are the main ones trying to holla [at your man], 'So, you gonna call me?' Sometimes you have to think for yourself." In addition, Lil' Mo told Honey magazine that Lil' Kim's feature was the "perfect match" for the song.

== Critical reception ==
The song received generally mixed reviews. While critics praised the song for its "set of rules" and dubbed it as an anthem in its own right, others like Donnie Kwak of Vibe magazine were divided over the song's theme and sample. Kwak criticized the song's composition as a "dull relationship advice column," and its use of sampling Biggie's "10 Crack Commandments," as "breaking an essential Hip-Hop Commandment: Thou shall not tarnish a classic." However, Kwak praised Lil' Kim's feature by remarking, "Kim's verse saves the day," while criticizing Lil' Mo's vocals by stating, "Mo should stick to hooks." By contrast, another Vibe editor, Akiba J. Solomon, called in Hilda Hutcherson, M.D. to list advice in examination of the song's synopsis and lyrical structure. Throughout the examination, Hutcherson opposed more than half of the song's "Ten Commandments," and listed full explanatorily advice for each of the song's "commandments."

== Track listing ==
12" vinyl

1. "Ten Commandments" (Amended Version)
2. "Ten Commandments" (Album Version)
3. "Ten Commandments" (Instrumental)
4. "Ten Commandments" (Amended Acappella)

== Chart performance ==
Chart (2003)	Peak position
US Billboard Bubbling Under Hot R&B/Hip-Hop Songs	1
