= The Scarlet Letter (album) =

Studio album by Lil' Mo
- Released: October 27, 2014
- Recorded: 2012–2014
- Length: 35:00
- Labels: Penalty Entertainment; RED
- Producers: Craig Brockman; Hoza Clowney; Winfred Crabtree II; Keenan Ephriam; Garrick Smith; Ryan Marrone; Jarius Mozee; Gabriel Roland; Tavin Sparrow; Josh "JD" Thomas; David Walker

Lil' Mo chronology
P.S. I Love Me (2011)	The Scarlet Letter (2014)

Singles from The Scarlet Letter
- 1. "Should've Never Let You Go" Released: September 23, 2014

The Scarlet Letter (stylized The SCARlet Letter) is the fifth studio album by American recording artist Lil' Mo. It was first released on October 27, 2014 by Penalty Entertainment. Its first and only single, "Should've Never Let You Go" preceded its release on September 23, 2014.

== Background ==
In 2013, Mo became a cast member of TV One reality show R&B Divas: Los Angeles alongside Chanté Moore, Kelly Price, Claudette Ortiz (of City High), Michel'le and Dawn Robinson. The series premiered in July 2013. The premiere of a reunion special to R&B Divas: LA built on TV One's historic summer ratings success, attaining a total of 834,000 viewers. Additionally, the special's ratings tied with the debut of the original sitcom The Rickey Smiley Show as the network's No. 1 telecast among adults 25–54 in TV One history.

On September 10, 2013, Lil' Mo released the song "I'm a Diva" via iTunes. Another song titled "L's Up" was released the following week. In April 2014, as part of preparation for her fifth album, The Scarlet Letter, Lil' Mo released her second mixtape No Shit Sherlock, which featured contributions by Da Brat and songwriter Tiyon "TC" Mack. On August 20, Lil' Mo announced via Twitter that The SCARlet Letter would be released on October 28, 2014.

== Track listing ==
No.	Title	Length
1.	"iMight"	3:55
2.	"Money Moet"	3:15
3.	"Ride"	3:56
4.	"Handsome Complicated"	2:28
5.	"Should've Never Let You Go"	3:19
6.	"Wait for You"	3:39
7.	"Permission"	4:51
8.	"Just Not That into You (JNITY)"	3:59
9.	"Chest Pain"	2:22
10.	"Watching Me"	3:16
Total length:		35:00

== Credits and personnel ==
Credits for The Scarlet Letter adapted from Allmusic.

- Jason Acuna - Mixing
- Adam "Streets" Arnwine - Composer
- Craig Brockman - Producer
- C. Chavez - Composer
- Hoza Clowney - Composer, Producer
- D. Cooper - Composer
- Winfred Crabtree II - Producer
- Keenan Ephriam - Producer
- Garrick Smit - Producer
- Doug Gelkie - Mixing
- Lil' Mo - Primary Artist
- C. Loving - Composer
- Ryan Marrone - Producer
- Nigel McIntosh - Mixing
- Jarius Mozee - Additional Production, Producer
- Mumen "Mookie" Ngenge - Vocals, Vocals (Background)
- Gabriel Roland - Producer
- Tavin Sparrow - Composer, Producer
- Josh "JD" Thomas - Mixing, Producer
- David Walker - Composer, Producer
