= Pain & Paper =

Studio album by Lil' Mo
- Released: August 28, 2007
- Length: 69:45
- Label: Drakeweb
- Producers: Daniel "D-Up" Allen; Adam Arnwine; Corey "The Bakery" Baker; Jules "Judah" Batholomew; Shawn and Shawn Bristol; Bryan Michael Cox; Esteban "Cito" Crandle; Lil' Mo; Mike Moore; Shea Taylor; Troy Taylor; Antwan "Amadeus" Thompson; Howard "Versityle Beatz" Tolliver; Wesley "Mr. Wes" Toone; Asaph A. Ward; Young Yonny

Lil' Mo chronology
Meet the Girl Next Door (2003)	Pain & Paper (2007)	P.S. I Love Me (2011)

Singles from Pain & Paper
- 1. "Sumtimes I" Released: June 25, 2007

Pain & Paper is the third studio album by American recording artist Lil' Mo. The album was released on August 28, 2007, by Drakeweb Music Group & Koch Records. It sold only 6,000 copies it first week. Appearances include Da Brat, Jim Jones, Fabolous, and Trina. Producers and songwriters include Jazze Pha, Stargate, Sean Garrett and Ne-Yo.

== Background ==
In 2006, Lil' Mo, alongside Faith Evans, Fantasia, and R&B-turned-gospel singer Coko, appeared on the remake of The Clark Sisters' "Endow Me" from Coko's gospel album Grateful (2006). Under her independent label HoneyChild Entertainment, Lil' Mo released the album Pain & Paper on August 28, 2007, with support from Ike Morris and Morris Management Group. The album featured production from Joey Cutless, Bryan-Michael Cox, Jules "Judah," Mike Moore, Troy Taylor, Adam "Streets" Arwine, Daniel "D-Up" Allen, Wesley "Mister Wes" Toone, among others. The first single from the effort included "Sumtimes I" featuring rapper Jim Jones. Later in the year, a second and final single, "Lucky Her", was released.

== Critical reception ==
Professional ratings
Review scores
Source	Rating
About.com	3.5/5 stars

Mark Edward Nero from About.com wrote that the singer "has the vocal and stylistic maturity to also appeal people in their late 30s and 40s, making this the rare R&B album that has a lot for fans of traditional R&B as well as the more modern type." He felt that Pain & Paper "is a true gem that probably won't get a fraction of the attention it deserves." AllMusic found that on Pain & Paper, "Lil' Mo offers up a confident, sophisticated set of R&B. While many of her peers focus on vocal histrionics, Mo presents her songs with intuitive restraint and real emotion [...] Although she lacks a high profile, Mo proves that she's one of the better singers in the game with this excellent 2007 outing." AllHipHop remarked that "it's disappointing to fathom that Pain & Paper produces minimal growth from the woman who brought us such hood classics like "Superwoman." While each song appears to say something, most listeners will probably hear nothing. There is little intrinsically deep about Pain & Paper; it has no soul. While it can be assumed that Lil' Mo's experiences should inspire life-changing music, maybe her new label put the ax on that."

== Singles ==
The lead single "Sumtimes I" was released on June 25, 2007. It features rapper Jim Jones. Its music video was directed by Gabriel E. Hart of Drew Barrymore's unreleased VH1 program Shoot to Kill. The promotional single "Lucky Her" was released in September 2007.

== Track listing ==
No.	Title	Writer(s)	Producer(s)	Length
1.	"Intro"	Cynthia Loving	Loving	1:59
2.	"Officially Hollywood" (featuring Katt Williams)	Loving; Williams	Jules "Judah" Batholomew	4:01
3.	"Sumtimes I" (featuring Jim Jones)	Loving; Jones	Antwan "Amadeus" Thompson; Esteban "Cito" Crandle; Andre Johnson^{[a]}	3:49
4.	"Heartbeat" (featuring Donny Roc)	Loving; Donovan Green	Bryan Michael Cox	5:03
5.	"Lucky Her"	Loving	Shea Taylor	4:26
6.	"Broken Heart"	Loving; Batholomew	Loving; Batholomew	5:15
7.	"Husband"	Billy Beck; Larry Troutman	Howard "Versityle Beatz" Tolliver; Troy Taylor	3:34
8.	"Jus' Like That"	Asaph A. Ward	Ward	4:02
9.	"Youngin'" (featuring Da Brat)	Loving; Shawntae Harris	Daniel "D-Up" Allen; Mike Moore; Corey "The Bakery" Baker; Adam Arnwine	4:34
10.	"One for the Road"	Loving	Wesley "Mr. Wes" Toone	4:29
11.	"I Need You Now"	Loving	Young Yonny	4:08
12.	"How Can I Tell" (featuring Heaven)	Loving; Heaven Stone	Young Yonny	3:56
13.	"Sexy Pictures" (featuring Trina)	Loving; Katrina Taylor	Arnwine; Baker	4:07
14.	"No Hotel"	Loving	Allen; Moore; Toone	4:05
15.	"Baby Please"	Loving	Shawn and Shawn Bristol	3:42
16.	"Dotted I (I'm Not Perfect)"	Batholomew; Tyann Brown	Batholomew	3:46
17.	"Sumtimes Part II" (featuring Fabolous)	Loving; John Jackson	Thompson; Crandle; Andre Johnson^{[a]}	4:09

Notes

- ^{^[a]} denotes additional producer

== Charts ==
Chart (2007)	Peak position
US Billboard 200	112
US Top R&B/Hip-Hop Albums (Billboard)	14
