= Gangsta (Love 4 the Streets) =

Single by Lil' Mo

from the album Based on a True Story
- Released: August 2001
- Recorded: Flava Station Studios (Queens, New York)
- Genre: R&B; hip hop soul; g-funk
- Label: Elektra
- Songwriter(s): C. Loving, D. McClary, M. Allen
- Producer(s): Darryl "Big Baby" McClary, Michael "Suga Mike" Allen

Lil' Mo singles chronology
"I Cry" (2001)	"Gangsta (Love 4 the Streets)" (2001)	"If I Could Go!" (2002)

"Gangsta (Love 4 the Streets)", also known as "Gangsta", is a song by American recording artist Lil' Mo. It was released as the third and final single from Mo's debut album, Based on a True Story (2001). The song was produced and co-written by Darryl "Big Baby" McClary and Michael "Suga Mike" Allen from Mo's production team Flavahood, and features a notable sample of Snoop Dogg's 1994 single, "Gin and Juice".

== Music video ==
=== Background ===
A music video for the single was directed by Chris Robinson and featured a cameo appearance by Tom Lister, Jr. Originally, the video was slated to be a double-video shoot in conjunction with the cancelled accompanying single, "Supa Star", however, because Lil' Mo was assaulted during the closing of a San Francisco concert, plans were quickly changed to meet the deadline of mid-July 2001. In late-August 2001, the video premiered on BET.

=== Synopsis ===
The video opens with Lil' Mo and her girlfriends sitting in her living room while watching a television show called: Ghettoblanca, which coincidentally happens to feature Mo as the leading female role. After the show ends, Mo and her girls freshen up and get their hair fixed in Mo's kitchen. They are later seen walking out of the house and observing the neighborhood, which is in the style of an urban California-like setting. For the remainder of the video, Mo is either seen riding in a pink hoopty with her girls or dancing while reprising her role in Ghettoblanca.

== Track listings and formats ==
CD single

1. "Gangsta (Love 4 the Streets)" (Album Version)
2. "Gangsta (Love 4 the Streets)" (Instrumental)
3. "Gangsta (Love 4 the Streets)" (TV Track)
4. "Gangsta (Love 4 the Streets)" (Acapella)

12-inch vinyl

1. "Gangsta (Love 4 the Streets)" (Amended Version) (featuring Snoop Dogg)
2. "Gangsta (Love 4 the Streets)" (Original Version) (featuring Snoop Dogg)
3. "Gangsta (Love 4 the Streets)" (Album Version)
4. "Gangsta (Love 4 the Streets)" (Acapella)
5. "Gangsta (Love 4 the Streets)" (Instrumental)

== Chart performance ==
Prior to its physical release, the song began charting solely on urban airplay under its former title "Keep It Gangsta" in early August 2001. The song was later revised after its two-week stint on the Hot R&B/Hip-Hop Airplay chart to its single version title, "Gangsta (Love 4 the Streets)".

Chart (2001)	Peak position
US Hot R&B/Hip-Hop Singles & Tracks (Billboard)	57
US Rhythmic Top 40 (Billboard)	39
