= I Cry (Ja Rule song) =

2001 single by Ja Rule

Single by Ja Rule featuring Lil' Mo

from the album Rule 3:36
- Released: May 15, 2001
- Length: 4:32
- Label: Def Jam; Murder Inc.
- Songwriters: Jeffrey Atkins; Robert Mays; Irving Lorenzo; Cynthia Loving; Kenneth Gamble; Leon Huff
- Producers: Lil' Rob; Irv Gotti

Ja Rule singles chronology
"6 Feet Underground" (2000)	"I Cry" (2001)	"I'm Real" (Murder Remix) (2001)

Lil' Mo singles chronology
"Superwoman Pt. II" (2001)	"I Cry" (2001)	"Gangsta (Love 4 the Streets)" (2001)

"I Cry" is the fourth and final single from American rapper Ja Rule's second studio album, Rule 3:36. The song samples "Cry Together" by the O'Jays, written by Kenneth Gamble and Leon Huff. This was also the final collaborative single by Ja Rule and former associate Lil' Mo; it was after this release that Irv Gotti decided that Ja Rule should work with Ashanti.

Released on May 15, 2001, "I Cry" peaked at number 40 on the US Billboard Hot 100, number 25 on the Billboard Hot Rap Singles chart, and number 11 on the Billboard Hot R&B/Hip-Hop Singles & Tracks chart. In 2008, the song was used as a sample in LL Cool J's record "Cry", which also features Lil' Mo.

== Charts ==
=== Weekly charts ===
Chart (2001)	Peak position
US Billboard Hot 100	40
US Hot R&B/Hip-Hop Songs (Billboard)	11
US Hot Rap Songs (Billboard)	25
US Rhythmic Airplay (Billboard)	25

=== Year-end charts ===
Chart (2001)	Position
US Hot R&B/Hip-Hop Singles & Tracks (Billboard)	69
