= Dem Boyz (Lil' Mo song) =

Single by Lil' Mo

from the album Syndicated: The Lil' Mo Hour
- Released: May 24, 2005
- Recorded: Time Machine Studios (Accokeek, Maryland)
- Genre: R&B, funk, soul
- Length: 3:26
- Label: Cash Money, Universal, Roun'table
- Songwriters: C. Stone, C. Thompson, J. Banks, E. Marion, H. Thigpen
- Producer: Chucky Thompson

Lil' Mo singles chronology
"Mother of Your Child" (2005)	"Dem Boyz" (2005)	"Sumtimes I" (2007)

"Dem Boyz" is a song recorded by American recording artist Lil' Mo for her unreleased album, Syndicated: The Lil' Mo Hour (2005). The song features production by Chucky Thompson and a 1978 sample of Bar-Kays' "Holy Ghost (Reborn)." The inspiration for the song originally came from Lil' Mo's fascination with the R&B sound at the time "going back to its roots," and her consistency in "providing real music."

== Critical reception ==
The song met generally favorable reviews. Bret McCabe of Baltimore City Paper heavily praised the track for its production, citing the sound as a "discombobulating disco backbeat" and later referred to the song as a "pelvic pulse" and "booty-quake cake." McCabe also added that the production's "bob and shimmy kick-drum, rollicking whistle, and saucy horn blasts" set a party theme in similar fashion of Beyoncé's 2003 record, "Crazy In Love." Jermy Leeuwis of Music Remedy also praised the track, citing it as a "bona fide" hit.

== Music video ==
A music video for the single was directed by David Palmer and primarily took place in Lil' Mo's hometown Baltimore, Maryland. The video is also noted for featuring cameo appearances by the likes of Birdman, Tray Chaney and Felicia "Snoop" Pearson from the former HBO series, The Wire.

== Track listings and formats ==
iTunes download

1. "Dem Boyz (Radio Version)" [Clean] — 3:26

12"/CD single

1. "Dem Boyz" (Radio Version) — 3:26
2. "Dem Boyz" (Instrumental) — 3:26
3. "Dem Boyz" (Acapella) — 3:23
4. "Dem Boyz" (TV Track) — 3:25

== Charts ==
Weekly chart performance for "Dem Boyz"
Chart (2005)	Peak position
Netherlands Urban (MegaCharts)	95
US Hot R&B/Hip-Hop Songs (Billboard)	86
