= Hot Boyz (song) =

1999 single by Missy Elliott

Single by Missy Elliott featuring Nas, Eve and Q-Tip

from the album Da Real World
- Released: November 9, 1999
- Studio: Master Sound (Virginia Beach, Virginia)
- Length: 3:47
- Label: Goldmind; Elektra
- Songwriters: Melissa Elliott; Timothy Mosley
- Producer: Timbaland

Missy Elliott singles chronology
"Ya Di Ya" (1999)	"Hot Boyz" (1999)	"Take That" (2000)

Lil' Mo singles chronology
"5 Minutes" (1998)	"Hot Boyz" (1999)	"Ta Da" (2000)

Nas singles chronology
"Nastradamus" (1999)	"Hot Boyz" (1999)	"You Owe Me" (2000)

Eve singles chronology
"Gotta Man" (1999)	"Hot Boyz" (1999)	"Triflin'" (1999)

Q-Tip singles chronology
"Vivrant Thing" (1999)	"Hot Boyz" (1999)	"Breathe and Stop" (2000)

Music video
- "Hot Boyz" on YouTube

"Hot Boyz" is a song by American rapper Missy Elliott featuring background vocals from American singer Lil' Mo. The remix version of the song was an urban hit featuring Nas, Eve and Q-Tip. The remix broke the record for most weeks at number-one on the US R&B chart on the issue dated January 15, 2000; as well as spending 18 weeks at number one on the Hot Rap Singles from December 4, 1999, to March 25, 2000, a record not broken until "Old Town Road" by Lil Nas X in 2019. The song also reached number 5 on the US Hot 100 on January 15, 2000. In the UK, the song became the biggest hit from the Da Real World album; it peaked at #18, being Missy's sixth top 40 and fourth top 20 solo success. On February 4, 2000 the song was certified Platinum by the Recording Industry Association of America.

"Hot Boyz" would rank as the number-one rap song on the Billboard Year-End Hot Rap Singles of 2000.

== Music video ==
Hype Williams directed the music video from October 13–14, 1999, which features Elliott singing and rapping in a huge arena, intercut with clips of dancers and strobe lights. Williams also used a vast amount of pyrotechnics, primarily used in the fast cuts to important figures in the video. Cameos include Mary J. Blige, Ginuwine, and Timbaland. Nas and Eve were featured, but Q-Tip did not appear in the video. His section was replaced with Elliott's rap verse from the original version.

== Track listings ==
US 12-inch single Side A

1. "Hot Boyz" (Remix) (Original Version) (featuring Lil' Mo, Nas, Eve & Q-Tip) - 3:53
2. "Hot Boyz" (Instrumental) - 3:35
3. "Hot Boyz" (Remix) (Acapella) (featuring Lil' Mo, Nas, Eve & Q-Tip) - 3:50

Side B

1. "Hot Boyz" (Original Version) (featuring Lil' Mo) - 4:35
2. "Hot Boyz" (Amended Version) (featuring Lil' Mo) - 3:33

US CD single

1. "Hot Boyz" (Amended Version) (featuring Lil' Mo) - 3:33
2. "Hot Boyz" (Remix Amended Version) (featuring Lil' Mo, Nas, Eve & Q-Tip) - 3:53
3. "Hot Boyz" (Remix Original Version) (featuring Lil' Mo, Nas, Eve & Q-Tip) - 3:53

US CD maxi-single

1. "Hot Boyz" (Remix Original Version) (featuring Lil' Mo, Nas, Eve & Q-Tip)
2. "U Can't Resist" (Original Version) (featuring B.G. & Juvenile)
3. "She's a Bitch" (Original Version)
4. "She's a Bitch" (Blaze 2000 Remix)
5. "Hot Boyz" (Instrumental)
6. "Hot Boyz" (Remix Acapella) (featuring Nas, Eve & Q-Tip)

== Charts ==
=== Weekly charts ===
Chart (1999–2000)	Peak position
Europe (Eurochart Hot 100)	80
France (SNEP)	78
Germany (GfK)	52
New Zealand (Recorded Music NZ)	34
Scottish Singles Sales (Official Charts)	57
UK Singles (Official Charts)	18
UK Dance (Official Charts)	4
UK Hip Hop/R&B (Official Charts)	2
US Billboard Hot 100	5
US Hot R&B/Hip-Hop Songs (Billboard)	1
US Hot Rap Songs (Billboard)	1
US Rhythmic Airplay (Billboard)	7

=== Year-end charts ===
Chart (2000)	Position
US Billboard Hot 100	32
US Hot R&B/Hip-Hop Singles & Tracks (Billboard)	4
US Hot Rap Singles (Billboard)	1
US Rhythmic Top 40 (Billboard)	28

== Certifications ==
Region	Certification	Certified units/sales
United States (RIAA)	Platinum	1,000,000^{^}
^{^} Shipments figures based on certification alone.
