= Hot Girls =

Single by Lil' Mo featuring Lil Wayne

from the album Syndicated: The Lil' Mo Hour
- Released: November 9, 2004
- Recorded: Cutting Room (New York City, New York)
- Genre: R&B, hip hop
- Length: 3:52
- Label: Cash Money/Universal/Roun'table Entertainment
- Songwriters: C. Loving, D. Carter, B. Cox
- Producer: Bryan-Michael Cox

Lil' Mo singles chronology
"Can't Let You Go" (2003)	"Hot Girls" (2004)	"Yeah Yeah Yeah" (2005)

Lil Wayne singles chronology
"Go D.J." (2004)	"Hot Girls" (2004)	"Soldier" (2004)

"Hot Girls," also known as its alternate title "Hot Boys, Hot Girls," is a R&B and hip hop song recorded by American recording artist Lil' Mo for her unreleased album, Syndicated: The Lil' Mo Hour (2005). The song features guest vocals by former labelmate Lil Wayne and production by frequent collaborator Bryan-Michael Cox. A remix for the single featuring Fabolous was released on DJ Envy's mixtape, Ahead of the Game: The Final Chapter.

== Critical reception ==
In spite of the buzz garnered from Lil' Mo's record deal with Cash Money, reception for the song was generally mixed to negative. Critics felt that the song was an "insecure female anthem," due to Mo's recitation of "I'm not Britney, I'm not Jessica, I'm not Mýa but I'm still on fire." Many were also appalled by Mo's verse: "...Mine don't look like yours but I still got it going on," where critics believed Mo was further solidifying her point of feeling some sort of insecurity or jealousy. Others also did not take too likely of Lil Wayne's guest appearance either, where they felt he was "rapping like Jay-Z again." By contrast, Jermy Leeuwis of Music Remedy complimented the single as "sizzling" and praised Lil Wayne's feature as "precocious."

== Formats and track listings ==
- iTunes download

No.	Title	Length
1.	"Hot Girls" (Radio Version. Featuring Lil Wayne.)	3:52
2.	"Hot Girls" (Radio Version - No Rap)	3:21

- 12" vinyl

No.	Title	Length
1.	"Hot Girls" (Radio Version)	3:51
2.	"Hot Girls" (Radio Version No Rap)	3:51
3.	"Hot Girls" (Instrumental)	3:48
4.	"Hot Girls" (Acapella)	3:50
5.	"Hot Girls" (TV Track)	3:50

== Charts ==
Chart (2004)	Peak position
US Billboard Hot R&B/Hip-Hop Singles Sales	28
