= 5 Minutes (Lil' Mo song) =

Single by Lil' Mo featuring Missy Elliott

from the album Why Do Fools Fall in Love OST
- Released: June 29, 1998
- Recorded: 1998; Quad Studios (New York, New York)
- Genre: R&B; electro-funk; alternative hip hop
- Label: Elektra; EastWest; WEA
- Songwriters: Missy Elliott; Gerard Thomas; Donald Holmes; Kelly Price
- Producers: Missy "Misdemeanor" Elliott; Gerard Thomas; Donald "Lenny" Holmes

Lil' Mo singles chronology
"5 Minutes" (1998)	"Hot Boyz" (1999)

Missy Elliott singles chronology
"Make It Hot" (1998)	"5 Minutes" (1998)	"I Want You Back" (1998)

"5 Minutes" is the debut single performed by American R&B vocalist, Lil' Mo. The song features production and guest vocals by frequent collaborator Missy "Misdemeanor" Elliott and originally served as the lead single from the original soundtrack of Why Do Fools Fall in Love (1998). However, because it was ignored by American mainstream radio outlets, the song was instead released as the soundtrack's first international single while contenders "I Want You Back" and "No Fool No More" were chosen in its place as a leading single.

== Critical reception ==
The song met generally favorable reviews. Craig Seymour of SPIN Magazine reviewed the song as being "quirky," and even referenced its underperformance in the United States, stating: "If you slept on '5 Minutes,' you missed one of 1998's most badass singles." AllMusic contributor Stephen Thomas Erlewine praised the song for it being a "great moment to make [Why Do Fools Fall in Love] a first-rate urban contemporary and hip-hop soundtrack."

== Music video ==
=== Production and release ===
A music video for the single was directed by Rashidi Natara Harper in New York City and premiered on The Box in mid-July 1998. In spite of the single's non-charting performance in the US, the music video received frequent airplay on BET and College Television Network.

=== Synopsis ===
The video begins with a toddler riding her bike in a neighborhood in an opposite angle from a paper-machete alien strolling down the street. The video then cuts to Missy Elliott who is sitting in an open-trunk of a vehicle while performing her adlibs. Lil' Mo is then shown singing her verses while sitting in a blue chair in a front yard. The video then transitions to Mo picking up her girlfriends and riding in a car to meet up with the song's antagonist in an attempt to settle a feud. During the song's bridge, Mo and her girls are seen fighting with the antagonist. By the latter, Mo and accompanying backup dancers are caught in a still frame while the video intercuts with paper-machete aliens dancing with Missy, who is dressed in a Scottish attire.

== Track listings and formats ==
UK CD single

1. "5 Minutes" (Radio Version) — 4:08
2. "5 Minutes" (Video Version) — 4:38
3. "5 Minutes" (LP Version) — 4:52

UK 12" vinyl

1. "5 Minutes" (Radio Version) — 4:08
2. "5 Minutes" (Instrumental) — 4:51
3. "5 Minutes" (Acappella) — 4:53

"The Remixes" (Promo)

1. "Flavahood Remix" — 4:09
2. "Timbaland Remix" — 4:06

US 12" vinyl

1. "5 Minutes" (LP Version)
2. "5 Minutes" (Radio Version)
3. "5 Minutes" (Instrumental)
4. "5 Minutes" (Acapella)

US 12" promo vinyl

1. "5 Minutes" (Video Version)
2. "5 Minutes" (Instrumental)

== Chart performance ==
Chart (1998)	Peak position
UK Singles Chart	72

== Release history ==
Region	Date	Format
United States	June 29, 1998	Radio airplay, 12" vinyl
United States	August 14, 1998	Promo CDS
United Kingdom	October 26, 1998	CD single, Maxi
United States	November 17, 1998	CD single
