= Superwoman Pt. II =

Single by Lil' Mo featuring Fabolous

from the album Based on a True Story
- Released: March 6, 2001
- Recorded: Enterprise, Burbank, California
- Genre: R&B; hip hop; electro
- Length: 4:26
- Label: Elektra/WEA
- Songwriters: C. Loving, J. Jackson, E. Shaw, K. Ifill
- Producers: DJ Clue, Duro

Lil' Mo singles chronology
| "Put It on Me" (2000) | "Superwoman Pt. II" (2001) | "I Cry" (2001) |

Fabolous singles chronology
| "Superwoman Pt. II" (2001) | "Can't Deny It" (2001) |

"Superwoman Pt. II" is a song by American recording artist Lil' Mo from her debut album, Based on a True Story (2001). The song features the debut appearance by then-unknown Fabolous and remixed production by hip-hop producers DJ Clue and Ken "Duro" Ifill. To date, "Superwoman Pt. II" remains as Lil' Mo's most successful single to date as a leading artist.

== Background and meaning ==
Originally, the song was released as the Brian Michael Cox–produced "Superwoman, Pt. I" in February 2001 to generally mixed reviews. However, because the "Pt. 1" version failed to attain successful radio airplay, Elektra Records had no other choice but to push Lil' Mo's debut album back to a later release in 2001. Upset, Lil' Mo tried to convince Elektra that "Superwoman" would be a smash hit; to prove it, Mo contacted DJ Clue to remix the "Superwoman" track with a beat that he was holding for rap duo M.O.P. At first Clue was not in support of the idea, but when he loved the results, he premiered it on New York City's Hot 97 radio show. Following its premiere, the song began to circulate on numerous mixtapes and began to chart on Billboard; however because Billboard prohibited remixes from charting, Mo had to convince Elektra to re-release the single in an alternate title, now famously known as "Superwoman, Pt. II."

When interviewed on the song's meaning, Lil' Mo identified the song as being an "anti-chicken head" anthem, and explained that the concept behind it was to inform guys that she was independent, but at the same time, needed "that shoulder to lean on."

== Recording and composition ==
During a two-hour studio session, Lil' Mo recorded the "Superwoman" vocals at Enterprise Studios in Burbank, California. Additionally, Mo had to beatbox the infamous stuttering "da-da-da-da-da" beat to her production team since they were not understanding her vision. Since she was in Los Angeles, Mo had a deadline to transfer her vocals via a CD to give to DJ Clue at a New York airline.

Within that deadline, a relative of Mo's requested her to feature "the mixtape rapper who spells his name," unquestionably known as Fabolous. Mo would then contact Clue to see if it was possible to feature the rapper, and within a three-day span, Clue added the rapper to the record. Fabolous at the time was shocked of Lil' Mo's decision to feature him since Mo had worked with other well-known rappers like Jay-Z and Ja Rule.

While the original 'Part 1' version featured a mid-tempo sample of Graham Nash's 1970 record "Chicago," the 'Part 2' version was set in the key of F-sharp minor and featured a "crazy beat" backed up by a heavy bass.

== Music video ==
A music video for the single was directed by Chris Robinson and premiered in early March 2001. It begins with Lil' Mo dancing to the song's beat in the dark with glowing blue lights, while Fabolous begins rapping his first verse in a diner. The video then cuts to Lil' Mo working as a waitress in the diner where she spots her love interest (portrayed by Jensen Atwood) exiting to attend a county fair. Mo is later seen exiting the diner and saving a civilian from a purse robbery. The latter of the video then shows Mo in her infamous blue braids while playing at a bowling alley to gain the affection of her love interest.

== Track listings and formats ==
European CD single

1. "Superwoman Pt. II" (Soul Society Remix) (featuring Fabolous) — 4:02
2. "Superwoman Pt. II" (Amended Version without Rap) — 3:23
3. "Superwoman Pt. II" (Album Version w/ Rap) (featuring Fabolous) — 4:26
4. "Superwoman Pt. II" (Amended Version) — 3:54

UK CD single

1. "Superwoman" (Amended Version - No Rap) — 3:28
2. "Superwoman Pt. II" (Remix) (Amended Version with Rap) (Edit) (featuring Fabolous) — 4:00
3. "Superwoman Pt. II" (Remix) (Instrumental) — 4:23

US 12" vinyl

1. "Superwoman" (Album Version)
2. "Superwoman" (Instrumental)
3. "Superwoman" (Acapella)
4. "Superwoman Pt. II Remix" (Album Version w/ Rap) (featuring Fabolous)
5. "Superwoman Pt. II Remix" (Instrumental)
6. "Superwoman Pt. II Remix" (Acappella)

US CD single

1. "Superwoman Part I" (Amended Version w/ Rap) — 3:58
2. "Superwoman" (Instrumental) — 3:55
3. "Superwoman Part II" (Amended Version w/ Rap) (featuring Fabolous) — 4:29
4. "Superwoman" (Instrumental) — 4:23

== Charts ==
=== Weekly charts ===
| Chart (2001) | Peak position |
|---|---|
| US Billboard Hot 100 | 11 |
| US Hot R&B/Hip-Hop Songs (Billboard) | 4 |
| US Pop Airplay (Billboard) | 36 |
| US Rhythmic Airplay (Billboard) | 8 |

=== Year-end charts ===
| Chart (2001) | Position |
|---|---|
| US Billboard Hot 100 | 53 |
| US Hot R&B/Hip-Hop Songs (Billboard) | 20 |
