= Lil' Mo =

American singer (born 1978)

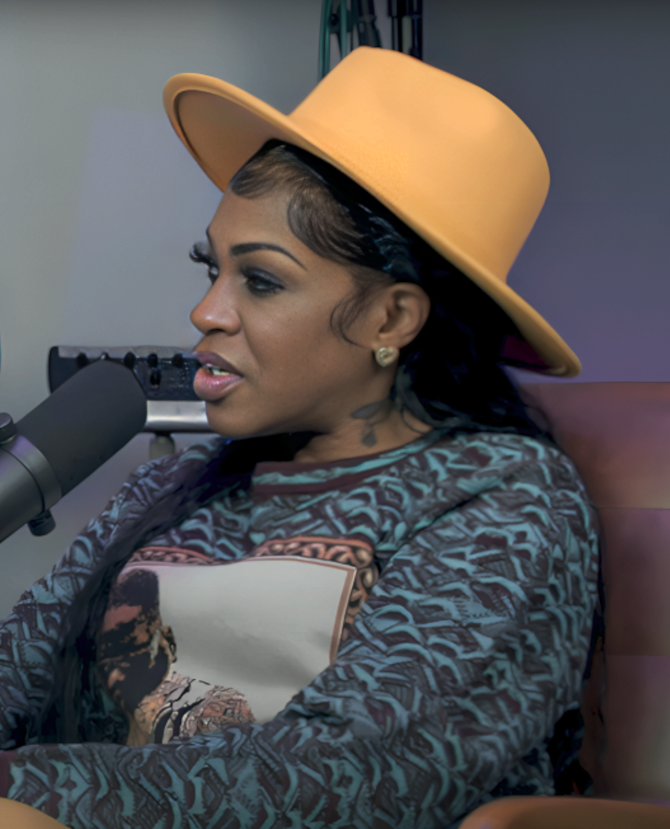
- Loving in 2023
- Born: Cynthia Karen Loving; November 19, 1978 (age 47); Long Island, New York, U.S.
- Other names: Godmother; Girl Next Door; Queen of Shade
- Occupations: Singer; songwriter; radio personality; actress
- Years active: 1998–present
- Spouses: Gus Stone (m. 2001; div. 2007) Phillip Bryant (m. 2008; div. 2014) Karl Dargan (m. 2014; div. 2021)
- Children: 5
- Awards: Full list
- Musical career
- Origin: Baltimore, Maryland, U.S. Manhattan, New York City, U.S.
- Genre: R&B
- Instrument: Vocals
- Labels: Penalty; Astra; HoneyChild Ent; Krian; Bronx Bridge; Global Music; Koch; Roun'table; Cash Money; Universal Violator; EastWest; Elektra
- Website: thelilmoshow.com

Cynthia Karen Loving (born November 19, 1978), known professionally as Lil' Mo, is an American R&B singer, songwriter, radio personality, television personality and actress. She is best known for her 2001 single "Superwoman Pt. II" (featuring Fabolous), which peaked at number 11 on the Billboard Hot 100 and is credited with launching Fabolous' career. Regarded as Missy Elliott's protégé, Elliott guest appeared on Lil Mo's 1998 debut single "5 Minutes", which was released for the Why Do Fools Fall in Love film soundtrack. The following year, Lil' Mo appeared alongside Nas, Eve, and Q-Tip on Elliott's 1999 single "Hot Boyz". She guest performed alongside Vita on Ja Rule's 2000 singles "Put It on Me", as well as his 2001 single "I Cry", the former of which was nominated for Best Rap Performance by a Duo or Group at the 44th Annual Grammy Awards.

== Early life ==
Mo was born into a military family. Her father, Bishop Jacob D. Loving, and her mother, First-Lady Cynthia Loving Sr., raised her primarily in Long Island, but moved regularly due to her father's military assignments. The family lived in Texas, Georgia and North Carolina before settling in Baltimore. As an adult, Mo moved to New York City's Manhattan borough to pursue her music career.

== Career ==
=== Beginnings (1996–2000) ===
Mo began her career as a backing vocalist, session musician and songwriter. In early 1998, while submitting demo material to Elektra Records for Nicole Wray's 1998 debut album, Make It Hot, Mo caught the attention of Missy Elliott, who helped land her a contract deal with Elektra. On June 29, 1998, Mo released her debut single "5 Minutes" from the soundtrack for the Frankie Lymon biographical film Why Do Fools Fall in Love. The song was planned to appear on Mo's debut album, however when it underperformed in the US, it was pulled from the final track listing. Mo's debut album was originally set to be released in March 1999, however, it was pushed back multiple times during Elektra's attempts to revamp Mo's image and sound.

Mo gained further exposure during this time for her features on Ol' Dirty Bastard's cover of Billie Holiday's "Good Morning Heartache", Missy Elliott's record-breaking single "Hot Boyz", which spent 18 weeks at number one on the Hot Rap Singles from December 4, 1999, to March 25, 2000, and Ja Rule's single "Put It on Me", which was a hit on both urban and pop radio, and reached number eight on the US pop charts. More collaborations by Ja Rule and Lil' Mo followed, including "I Cry", which repurposed The O'Jays' 1978 hit "Cry Together".

=== Breakthrough, Based on a True Story (2001) ===
On April 10, 2000, Mo released "Ta Da", her first solo single. After years of successful collaborations and features, Mo would finally release a successful hit of her own, "Superwoman Pt. II", her second single from her upcoming album. The single was released on March 6, 2001, and peaked at No. 11 on the Billboard Hot 100, helping bring then-underground rapper Fabolous to mainstream attention. On June 26, 2001, Mo's debut album, Based on a True Story was released to generally favorable reviews. The album peaked at No. 14 on the Billboard 200 and attained a gold certification from the RIAA, making it Mo's successful album to date. In August 2001, Mo released the follow-up single "Gangsta (Love 4 the Streets)", however, it failed to match the success of its predecessor.

=== Meet the Girl Next Door, career struggles (2002–05) ===
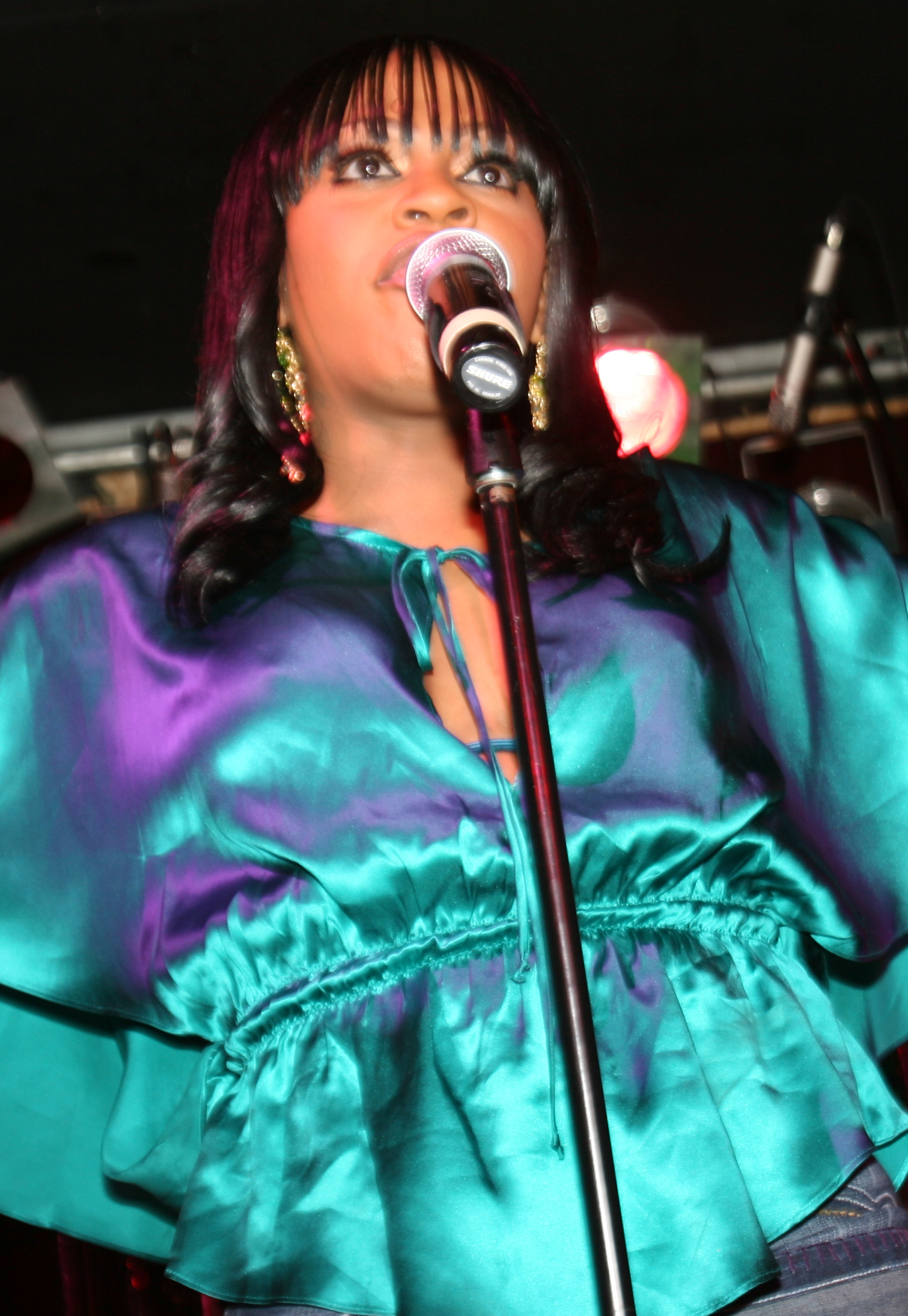
Loving in 2005.

While recovering from being assaulted with a champagne bottle after a performance in San Francisco, Mo began her radio career, working as a part-time anchor for Baltimore urban radio station WERQ-FM. That same year, Mo began preparations for her second album, Meet the Girl Next Door. The album was released on April 29, 2003, preceded by the singles "4Ever" and "Ten Commandments". While Mo promoted the singles on shows such as Jimmy Kimmel Live! and Soul Train, she would later criticise Elektra for their lack of support and minimal promotion for the album, which she attributed to being pregnant at the time.

Mo's contract with Elektra expired as the label was absorbed by Atlantic Records, and in July 2004, she signed Universal's Cash Money Records to record her third album, then titled Syndicated: the Lil' Mo Hour. The album was scheduled for an early 2005 release, before being pushed back to October, after its four singles (including "Hot Girls" and "Dem Boyz") failed to create any buzz. Following the destruction of Cash Money's New Orleans studio by Hurricane Katrina, Mo was dropped from the Cash Money roster and Syndicated was shelved.

=== Independent releases, Pain and Paper, P.S. I Love Me (2006–12) ===
Mo began releasing singles as an independent artist under her production company HoneyChild Entertainment, which was first founded by Mo in 2000. On August 28, 2007, Mo released the album Pain & Paper, distributed by Koch Entertainment and DrakeWeb Music Group and selling only 6000 copies. Its singles, "Sumtimes I", featuring Jim Jones, and "Lucky Her" failed to chart.

In 2008, Mo signed a two-album deal with Global Music Group and began work her fourth album, tentatively titled Tattoos & Roses: The Rebellion Against My Pain. The album was initially planned to include a second disc featuring Mo's live performances, however this was eventually scrapped. On May 8, 2011, Mo released the mixtape P.S. I Love You. On November 1, 2011, Mo released P.S. I Love Me in conjunction with Bronx Bridge Entertainment and distributed by Fontana Distribution. The album was preceded by the singles "On the Floor", "I Love Me", featuring Tweet, and "Take Me Away", featuring Maino.

=== Television career, The Scarlet Letter, retirement (2013–present) ===
In 2013, Mo became a cast member of the reality television series R&B Divas: Los Angeles, which premiered on TV One on July 10, 2013. The season's reunion special garnered a total of 834,000 viewers, tying with the debut of the sitcom The Rickey Smiley Show as the network's No. 1 telecast among adults 25–54 in TV One history. On September 10, 2013, Lil' Mo released the song "I'm a Diva" via iTunes. Another non-album single, "L's Up", was released the following week.

On October 28, 2014, Mo released her fifth album, The Scarlet Letter, under Penalthy Entertainment. The album was preceded by the single "Should've Never Let You Go", as well as her second mixtape No Shit Sherlock, which featured contributions by Da Brat and songwriter Tiyon "TC" Mack. On April 29, 2015, R&B Divas: Los Angeles ended after its third season.

In January 2016, Mo began hosting the WKYS radio show The Fam in the Morning with DJ Quick Silva. She was fired from the show in February 2017. Later that year, Mo joined the cast of VH1's Love & Hip Hop: New York and appeared in an episode of Couples Court with the Cutlers. She would also appear in We TV's Marriage Boot Camp: Reality Stars 12 — Hip Hop Edition.

On October 25, 2018, Mo announced her retirement from the music industry to pursue a career in law.

== Personal life ==
=== Assault ===
On June 22, 2001, while being escorted to a limousine, Lil' Mo was assaulted by a male at a San Francisco concert venue. She was bludgeoned in the head by the man's champagne bottle and was immediately hospitalized at California Pacific Medical Center, where she received 20 stitches. The incident traumatized Mo and left her suspicious of the attack, in which she felt it may have been a potential "set up". Mo confirmed to MTV News that she had to cancel many shows and cease a double-music video shoot for her single "Gangsta" so she could recover from the incident. A reward ranging from $1,000 to $5,000 was issued in hopes of catching the assailant. Though the alleged male attacker was never found, local San Francisco police received anonymous tips that the attacker boasted about his actions at a Hunters Point housing project near San Francisco, California.

=== Marriages and children ===
In 2001, Mo met her first husband, Augustus "Gus" Stone, at a Washington, D.C. gas station. After dating for five months, they wed on August 29, 2001. On August 19, 2002, Mo gave birth to her first child, Heaven Love'on Stone. On February 24, 2005, Mo gave birth to the couple's second child, God'Iss Love Stone. In December 2005, she filed for divorce. Their divorce was finalized in August 2007. Through the marriage, she became the stepmother to his son, Jerez Coleman, who in June 2014 appeared as "Kidd Cole" on an episode of MTV's television series Catfish: The TV Show.

On June 22, 2008, Mo married Gospel recording artist Phillip Bryant. On January 16, 2009, Mo gave birth to her third child, Justin McKenzie Phillip Bryant. On July 10, 2012, Mo gave birth to her fourth child, Jonah Maddox-Phillip Bryant. The couple separated due to his infidelity and officially divorced on September 15, 2014.

On October 1, 2014, Mo married professional boxer Karl Dargan. On August 28, 2015, Mo gave birth to Karl Sharif Dargan Jr., her fifth child and Karl's third. In 2018, at the reunion special of Love & Hip Hop: New York, Mo announced that she was expecting her sixth child. Mo admitted on social media that she had suffered a miscarriage a month before the reunion aired. In May 2019, Mo announced that she had left Karl, after he had spat on her in front of their children during an argument. Mo revealed in later interviews that he had been physically abusive throughout their marriage. Their divorce was finalized in April 2021.

=== Personal struggles ===
In 2003, Mo revealed to Vibe magazine that she struggled with an eating disorder since 2000.

In 2019, Mo revealed that she had struggled with an opioid addiction.

=== Religion ===
Mo was raised in a Christian household; her parents are Holiness preachers. In a 2017 episode of Love & Hip Hop: New York, Mo revealed that she had converted to Islam three years prior as a result of her marriage to Karl, and is seen praying in hijab.

== Feuds ==
=== Ja Rule ===
A feud between Mo and former collaborator Ja Rule embroiled in late 2001, when Murder Inc. began favoring Ashanti over her. In January 2003, while co-hosting 106 & Park: Prime, Mo sent a shout-out to 50 Cent, just seconds after she premiered a Ja Rule video. The incident angered Ja Rule and Murder Inc. Mo had told the press she assumed BET was going to edit out the shout, and did not think the gesture would cause an uproar. Ja Rule released the diss track "Loose Change," which targeted Eminem, 50 Cent, Dr. Dre, Chris Lighty and Lil' Mo. Rule credited himself as the reason why she had any hits. In May 2003, Mo released a freestyle diss to Ja Rule.

In April 2003, controversy arose regarding payment for Lil' Mo's contributions on "I Cry" and "Put It on Me". In 2005, Lil' Mo filed a lawsuit against Ja Rule, Murder Inc. and Def Jam for over $15 million. In 2010, the two reconciled, and the next year, recorded a track together titled "U & Me".

=== Keyshia Cole ===
The feud between Lil' Mo and R&B singer Keyshia Cole originated in August 2005 via the radio series Star and Buc Wild Morning Show. Mo was reported to have dismissed the vocal talent of a new crop of R&B performers, saying that they relied on dancing. Cole took offense and went to Dream Hotel in New York City, where she encountered Lil' Mo's manager Phil Thornton and a stylist, allegedly stating "You all are traitors. [Lil' Mo] is the enemy.". Lil' Mo shrugged off the incident, saying she was told that Cole was intoxicated at the time, which Cole denied.

In March 2013, Cole was criticized by urban media outlets for her Twitter critique of Beyoncé's "Bow Down/I Been On". This led to Mo and Cole exchanging hostile tweets over the next few days. Despite the exchanges, in May 2013, Mo said there was no beef between her and Cole, which led to the two exchanging hostile messages again via Instagram and Twitter.

== Discography ==
Studio albums

- Based on a True Story (2001)
- Meet the Girl Next Door (2003)
- Pain & Paper (2007)
- P.S. I Love Me (2011)
- The Scarlet Letter (2014)

== Tours ==
- Lilith Fair (with Missy Elliott) (1998)
- Missy Elliott: Live in Hamburg/Germany (1998–1999)
- Sprite Simon Dtour Live (with 3LW) (2003)
- Rock the Mic Tour (with Jay-Z and 50 Cent) (2003)
- Seagram's Gin Live Tour (with Xscape) (2005)

== Filmography ==
=== Television ===
Television
2013–15	R&B Divas: Los Angeles	Herself	Main Cast
2014	Black Dynamite	Rondell's Mom / Offscreen Nurse / Woman in Horse Carriage	4 episodes
2017	Love & Hip Hop: New York	Herself	Main Cast
2019	Marriage Boot Camp	Herself	Main cast
2023	Power Book II: Ghost	Herself	Episode: "Your Perception, Your Reality"

== Awards and nominations ==
Year	Ceremony	Category	Nominated work	Result
2001	MTV Video Music Awards	Best Rap Video	"Put It on Me" (with Ja Rule and Vita)	Nominated
2001	The Source Awards	Single of the Year	"Put It on Me" (with Ja Rule and Vita)	Nominated
2002	44th Grammy Awards	Best Rap Performance by a Duo or Group	"Put It on Me" (with Ja Rule and Vita)	Nominated
2002	ASCAP Rhythm & Soul Music Awards	Award-Winning R&B/Hip-Hop Songs	"Put It on Me" (with Ja Rule and Vita)	Won
2002	BMI Urban Music Awards	Songwriter of the Year (shared with Irv Gotti and Ja Rule)	"Put It on Me" (with Ja Rule and Vita)	Won
2002	BMI Pop Music Awards	Publishers/Writers of the Year	"Put It on Me" (with Ja Rule and Vita)	Won
2002	BDS Certified Spin Awards	50,000 Radio Spins	"If I Could Go!" (with Sacario and Angie Martinez)	Won
2002	BDS Certified Spin Awards	100,000 Radio Spins	"If I Could Go!" (with Sacario and Angie Martinez)	Won
2003	Teen Choice Awards	Choice R&B/Hip Hop Track	"4Ever"	Nominated
2003	Teen Choice Awards	Choice Rap Track	"Can't Let You Go" (with Fabolous and Mike Shorey)	Nominated
2003	The Source Awards	Best Rap/R&B Collabo	"Can't Let You Go" (with Fabolous and Mike Shorey)	Nominated
2003	ASCAP Rhythm & Soul Music Awards	Award-Winning R&B/Hip-Hop Songs	"Can't Let You Go" (with Fabolous and Mike Shorey)	Won
2003	ASCAP Rhythm & Soul Music Awards	Award-Winning Rap Songs	"Can't Let You Go" (with Fabolous and Mike Shorey)	Won
2003	BDS Certified Spin Awards	50,000 Radio Spins	"Can't Let You Go" (with Fabolous and Mike Shorey)	Won
2003	BDS Certified Spin Awards	100,000 Radio Spins	"Can't Let You Go" (with Fabolous and Mike Shorey)	Won
2003	BDS Certified Spin Awards	200,000 Radio Spins	"Can't Let You Go" (with Fabolous and Mike Shorey)	Won
2004	ASCAP Pop Music Awards	Award-Winning Pop Songs	"Can't Let You Go" (with Fabolous and Mike Shorey)	Won
2005	BDS Certified Spin Awards	100,000 Radio Spins	"Superwoman, Pt. II"	Won
