= Lenny Kravitz discography =

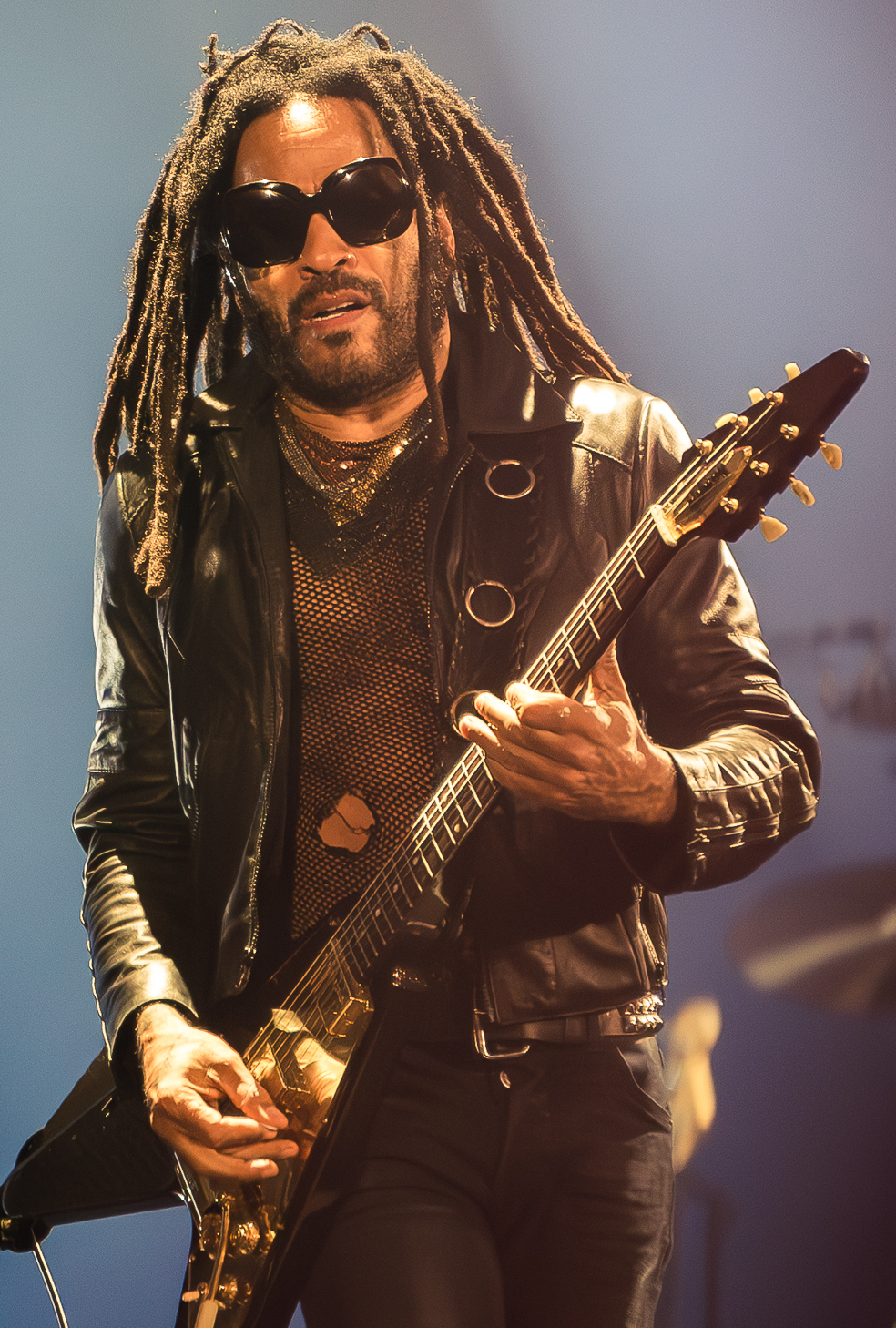
- Kravitz in 2024
- Studio albums: 12
- Extended plays: 2
- Soundtrack albums: 6
- Live albums: 3
- Compilation albums: 5
- Singles: 68
- Video albums: 8
- Music videos: 55

American rock singer Lenny Kravitz has released 12 studio albums, one greatest hits compilation album, four box set compilation albums, two extended plays, 68 singles, and eight video albums, including three live albums. His debut album, Let Love Rule (1989), peaked at number 61 in the US, and while receiving generally positive reviews, it became a huge success in Europe but took a long time to reach success in the US. Its followers, Mama Said (1991) and Are You Gonna Go My Way (1993), sold better overall than his debut, achieving platinum and multi-platinum status respectively, establishing Kravitz in the music industry and expanding his success in Europe and South America. However, despite only two years between albums, personal issues such as substance abuse problems, the aftermath of divorce, and his mother Roxie Roker's illness led to a decline in commercial sales with Circus (1995).

With 5 (1998), Kravitz embraced a fresh outlook towards his career and also experimented with electronic equipment such as Pro Tools. Initially, the album received only mediocre reviews, and slowly and steadily achieved worldwide success after spinning off hits such as "I Belong to You" and "Fly Away" to ultimately become Kravitz's most successful studio album to date. The album established his career at a higher level, with increasing worldwide popularity, especially in Europe, and won him his first two Grammy Awards. Greatest Hits (2000) would become Kravitz's most successful album to date, going on to sell over 10.5 million copies worldwide, earning him yet another Grammy Award. While Lenny (2001) sold briskly, although not quite comparing to 5 or Greatest Hits, it won Kravitz his fourth consecutive Grammy Award. However, Baptism was somewhat of a commercial disappointment for the multi-platinum artist when compared to its predecessors. His 2008 release It Is Time for a Love Revolution had Kravitz realising some of the best debut positions and opening sales weeks worldwide in years, along with his best critical reviews since Lenny.

Some of his albums (Let Love Rule, Mama Said, 5 and Greatest Hits) have sold enough copies to be certified at the next level within the sales threshold, but RIAA still has them certified at the lower sales level, with no official word on whether/when the certifications may occur. In addition to writing and producing all of his own work, Kravitz has produced albums for other artists, some reaching great success. He personally has scored three top-10 albums in the US, while having reached number one in both the UK and Australia. Kravitz has scored hits in virtually every continent: North America (US and Canada), Central America (Bahamas), Europe (United Kingdom, France, Germany, Spain and Scandinavia), South America (Brazil, Argentina and Colombia), Asia (Japan), Oceania (Australia and New Zealand), and Africa (Republic of South Africa). Considered one of the most successful and best-selling rock artists of his time, Kravitz has had sales of approximately 40 million albums alone worldwide (not including singles and video releases).

== Albums ==
=== Studio albums ===
Title	Album details	Peak chart positions										Sales	Certifications
Title	Album details	US	AUS	AUT	CAN	FRA	GER	NLD	NOR	SWI	UK	Sales	Certifications
Let Love Rule	Released: September 6, 1989; Label: Virgin; Formats: LP, cassette, CD, digital download	61	45	—	35	—	—	23	12	12	56	US: 760,000 (Note: Sales as of August 2001)	RIAA: Gold; BPI: Gold; IFPI SWI: Gold; MC: Platinum; NVPI: Gold; SNEP: Gold
Mama Said	Released: April 2, 1991; Label: Virgin; Formats: LP, cassette, CD, digital download	39	10	12	13	—	20	5	4	5	8	US: 1,880,000	RIAA: Platinum; ARIA: Gold; BPI: Platinum; BVMI: Gold; IFPI AUT: Gold; IFPI SWI: Gold; MC: Platinum; NVPI: Platinum; SNEP: Platinum
Are You Gonna Go My Way	Released: March 9, 1993; Label: Virgin; Formats: LP, cassette, CD, digital download	12	1	3	1	—	7	3	6	1	1	US: 2,160,000	RIAA: 2× Platinum; ARIA: 2× Platinum; BPI: Platinum; BVMI: Gold; IFPI NOR: Gold; IFPI SWI: Platinum; MC: 4× Platinum; NVPI: Platinum; SNEP: Platinum
Circus	Released: September 12, 1995; Label: Virgin; Formats: LP, cassette, CD, digital download	10	2	3	7	—	8	1	7	1	5	US: 527,000	RIAA: Gold; BPI: Gold; IFPI SWI: Gold; NVPI: Gold; SNEP: Gold
5	Released: May 12, 1998; Label: Virgin; Formats: LP, cassette, CD, digital download	28	17	1	22	9	6	8	7	3	18	US: 2,920,000	RIAA: 2× Platinum; ARIA: Platinum; BPI: Gold; BVMI: Gold; IFPI AUT: Gold; IFPI NOR: Gold; IFPI SWI: Platinum; MC: Platinum; NVPI: Gold; SNEP: 2× Gold
Lenny	Released: October 30, 2001; Label: Virgin; Formats: Cassette, CD, digital download	12	44	1	9	17	5	7	14	3	55		RIAA: Platinum; BVMI: Platinum; IFPI AUT: Gold; IFPI SWI: Platinum; MC: Platinum; NVPI: Gold
Baptism	Released: May 17, 2004; Label: Virgin; Formats: CD, digital download	14	42	4	12	8	2	3	17	3	74		RIAA: Gold; BVMI: Gold; IFPI AUT: Platinum; IFPI SWI: Gold; MC: Gold
It Is Time for a Love Revolution	Released: February 5, 2008; Label: Virgin; Formats: CD, digital download	4	47	2	5	5	3	2	28	1	42	US: 240,000 (Note: Sales as of August 2011)	BVMI: Gold; IFPI AUT: Gold; IFPI SWI: Gold; SNEP: Gold
Black and White America	Released: August 30, 2011; Label: Roadrunner, Atlantic; Formats: CD, digital download	17	59	2	45	7	1	2	—	1	75		IFPI SWI: Gold
Strut	Released: September 19, 2014; Label: Roxie, Kobalt Label Services; Formats: CD, LP, digital download	19	31	3	20	3	2	7	26	2	21		
Raise Vibration	Released: September 7, 2018; Label: Roxie, BMG; Formats: CD, LP, digital download	43	— (Note: Raise Vibration did not enter the ARIA Albums Chart, but peaked at number 40 on the ARIA Digital Albums Chart.)	4	—	3	3	8	—	3	19		SNEP: Gold
Blue Electric Light	Released: May 24, 2024; Label: Roxie, BMG; Formats: CD, LP, digital download	—	84	4	—	7	5	17	—	2	73		
"–" denotes a recording that did not chart or was not released in that territory.

=== Compilations ===
Title	Album details	Peak chart positions										Sales	Certifications
Title	Album details	US	AUS	AUT	CAN	FRA	GER	NLD	NOR	SWI	UK	Sales	Certifications
Greatest Hits	Released: October 24, 2000; Label: Virgin; Formats: CD, digital download, CD/DVD	2	14	1	2	89	2	4	6	2	12	US: 3,900,000 (Note: Sales as of May 2004)	RIAA: 3× Platinum; ARIA: 2× Platinum; BPI: 2× Platinum; BVMI: 2× Platinum; IFPI AUT: Platinum; IFPI NOR: Platinum; IFPI SWI: Platinum; MC: 4× Platinum; NVPI: Platinum; SNEP: Platinum

=== Box sets ===
Title	Album details
Let Love Rule / Mama Said	Released: October 22, 2001; Format: CD box set
Let Love Rule / Mama Said / Are You Gonna Go My Way	Released: October 7, 2002
5 / Lenny	Released: September 15, 2003; Format: CD box set
Lenny / Baptism	Released: 2004; Formats: CD box set

== EPs ==
- Spinning Around Over You (1994)
- Is There Any Love in Your Heart (1995)

== Singles ==
=== As lead artist ===
Year	Title	Peak chart positions										Certifications	Album
Year	Title	US	AUS	AUT	CAN	FRA	GER	ITA	NLD	SWI	UK	Certifications	Album
1989	"Let Love Rule"	89	36	—	—	—	—	—	26	59	39		Let Love Rule
1990	"I Build This Garden for Us"	—	83	—	—	—	—	—	51	—	83		Let Love Rule
1990	"Be"	—	—	—	—	—	—	—	—	—	—		Let Love Rule
1990	"Mr. Cab Driver"	—	—	—	—	—	—	—	—	—	58		Let Love Rule
1990	"Does Anybody Out There Even Care"	—	—	—	—	—	—	—	46	—	—		Let Love Rule
1991	"Always on the Run"	—	43	—	55	—	—	—	8	25	41		Mama Said
1991	"It Ain't Over 'til It's Over"	2	10	25	2	29	43	—	12	—	11	BPI: Gold; FIMI: Gold	Mama Said
1991	"Fields of Joy"	—	—	—	—	—	—	—	33	—	—		Mama Said
1991	"Stand by My Woman"	76	46	—	—	36	66	—	—	—	55		Mama Said
1991	"What the Fuck Are We Saying?"	—	—	—	—	—	—	—	34	—	—		Mama Said
1992	"What Goes Around Comes Around"	—	—	—	—	—	—	—	—	—	—		Mama Said
1992	"Stop Draggin' Around"	—	101	—	—	—	—	—	—	—	—		Mama Said
1993	"Are You Gonna Go My Way"	—	1	24	5	4	25	—	8	12	4	ARIA: Platinum; BPI: Gold; FIMI: Gold; SNEP: Gold	Are You Gonna Go My Way
1993	"Believe"	60	8	—	9	33	74	—	40	—	30	ARIA: Gold	Are You Gonna Go My Way
1993	"Heaven Help"	80	—	—	25	41	98	—	—	—	20		Are You Gonna Go My Way
1993	"Spinning Around Over You"	80	—	—	—	—	—	—	—	—	—		Reality Bites soundtrack
1993	"Is There Any Love in Your Heart"	—	32	—	53	—	—	—	—	—	52		Are You Gonna Go My Way
1994	"Deuce"	—	—	—	77	—	—	—	—	—	—		Kiss My Ass: Classic Kiss Regrooved
1995	"Rock and Roll Is Dead"	75	26	—	16	—	—	—	40	24	22		Circus
1995	"Circus"	—	—	—	85	—	—	—	—	—	54		Circus
1996	"Can't Get You Off My Mind"	62	—	—	33	—	—	—	—	—	54		Circus
1996	"The Resurrection" (Live)	—	—	—	—	—	—	—	—	—	—		Non-Album single
1998	"If You Can't Say No"	—	55	35	—	97	—	—	52	39	48		5
1998	"Thinking of You"	—	—	—	—	—	—	—	—	—	—		5
1998	"I Belong to You"	71	—	—	—	24	81	—	42	—	75		5
1998	"Fly Away"	12	8	11	3	56	15	—	49	19	1	ARIA: Gold; BPI: Platinum; FIMI: Gold	5
1999	"American Woman"	49	14	—	26	88	78	—	59	35	177	ARIA: Gold	Austin Powers: The Spy Who Shagged Me soundtrack
1999	"Black Velveteen"	—	—	—	—	—	—	—	—	94	83		5
2000	"Again"	4	30	6	—	57	19	1	9	25	—	ARIA: Gold	Greatest Hits
2001	"Dig In"	31	—	64	10	—	—	8	72	58	—		Lenny
2002	"Stillness of Heart"	—	—	51	22	83	38	16	84	31	44		Lenny
2002	"Believe in Me"	—	—	42	—	—	14	10	10	29	—		Lenny
2002	"If I Could Fall in Love"	—	—	—	—	—	—	31	98	85	—		Lenny
2002	"Yesterday Is Gone (My Dear Kay)"	—	—	—	—	—	—	—	—	—	—		Lenny
2004	"Show Me Your Soul" (with P. Diddy, Loon and Pharrell)	—	45	—	—	—	61	—	—	62	35		Bad Boys II soundtrack
2004	"Where Are We Runnin'?"	69	52	27	5	—	43	13	31	33	—		Baptism
2004	"Storm" (with Jay-Z)	98	—	—	—	—	—	—	—	—	—		Baptism
2004	"California"	—	—	56	—	—	—	—	64	57	62		Baptism
2004	"Lady"	27	—	—	49	—	—	—	99	—	—	RIAA: Gold	Baptism
2004	"Calling All Angels"	—	—	—	—	—	72	—	35	42	— (Note: "Calling All Angels" did not enter the Official UK Top 100 Chart, but debuted and peaked at number 79 on the Official Singles Downloads Chart Top 100 18 years later in March 2023, after Kravitz performed the song at the 95th Academy Awards.)		Baptism
2005	"Breathe"	—	—	—	—	—	—	—	—	—	—		Non-album single
2007	"Bring It On"	—	—	—	52	—	—	—	—	—	—		It Is Time for a Love Revolution
2007	"I'll Be Waiting"	73	—	6	45	27	6	4	5	4	104	BVMI: Gold; IFPI SWI: Gold	It Is Time for a Love Revolution
2008	"Love Love Love"	—	—	—	—	—	92	—	—	—	—		It Is Time for a Love Revolution
2008	"Dancin' Til Dawn"	—	—	—	—	—	—	—	96	—	—		It Is Time for a Love Revolution
2011	"Come On Get It"	—	—	—	—	—	—	—	—	—	—		Black and White America
2011	"Stand"	—	—	41	—	—	44	—	100	42	—		Black and White America
2011	"Rock Star City Life"	—	—	62	—	—	98	—	—	—	—		Black and White America
2011	"Black and White America"	—	—	—	—	100	—	—	92	—	—		Black and White America
2011	"Push"	—	—	—	—	—	—	—	—	—	—		Black and White America
2012	"Superlove"	—	—	—	—	—	—	—	25	—	49		Black and White America
2014	"The Chamber"	—	—	16	—	11	17	6	62	9	—	FIMI: Platinum	Strut
2014	"Sex"	—	—	—	—	107	—	—	—	—	—		Strut
2014	"New York City"	—	—	—	—	—	—	—	—	—	—		Strut
2014	"Dirty White Boots"	—	—	—	—	—	—	—	—	—	—		Strut
2015	"The Pleasure and the Pain"	—	—	—	—	—	80	—	—	—	—		Strut
2018	"It's Enough!"	—	—	—	—	75	—	—	—	—	—		Raise Vibration
2018	"Low"	—	—	—	—	9	61	53	—	69	—	FIMI: Gold	Raise Vibration
2018	"5 More Days 'Til Summer"	—	—	—	—	—	—	—	—	—	—		Raise Vibration
2019	"Johnny Cash"	—	—	—	—	—	—	—	—	—	—		Raise Vibration
2019	"Here to Love"	—	—	—	—	—	—	—	—	—	—		Raise Vibration
2020	"Ride"	—	—	—	—	—	—	—	—	—	—		Raise Vibration
2023	"TK421"	—	—	—	—	—	—	—	—	—	—		Blue Electric Light
2023	"Road to Freedom"	—	—	—	—	—	—	—	—	—	—		Rustin soundtrack
2023	"I Believe in Love Again" (with Peggy Gou)	—	—	—	—	—	—	—	—	—	—		I Hear You
2024	"Human"	—	—	—	—	—	—	—	—	—	—		Blue Electric Light
2024	"Paralyzed"	—	—	—	—	—	—	—	—	—	—		Blue Electric Light
2024	"Honey"	—	—	—	—	—	—	—	—	—	—		Blue Electric Light
2025	"Let It Ride"	—	—	—	—	—	—	—	—	—	—		Blue Electric Light
"—" denotes a release that did not chart.

=== As featured artist ===
Year	Single	Peak chart positions	Album
Year	Single	UK	Album
2020	"Stop Crying Your Heart Out" (as BBC Radio 2's Allstars)	7	Non-album single

== Music videos ==
List of music videos, showing director(s) and year released
Title	Year	Director(s)	Ref.
"Let Love Rule" (version 1)	1988	Lisa Bonet	
"Be"	1989	Jean-Baptiste Mondino	
"Let Love Rule" (version 2)	1989	Jim Gable	
"I Build This Garden for Us"	1990	Geoff Barish	
"Mr. Cab Driver"	1990	Geoff Barish	
"Always on the Run" (featuring Slash)	1991	Jesse Dylan	
"It Ain't Over 'til It's Over"	1991	Jesse Dylan	
"Stand by My Woman"	1991	Paul Boyd	
"Stop Draggin' Around" (live)	1991	Toru Uehara	
"More Than Anything In This World"	1991	Unknown	
"Are You Gonna Go My Way"	1993	Mark Romanek	
"Believe"	1993	Michel Gondry	
"Heaven Help" (version 1)	1993	Per Gustafson	
"Heaven Help" (version 2)	1993	Joel Schumacher	
"Is There Any Love in Your Heart"	1993	Mark Romanek	
"Spinning Around Over You"	1994	Doug Nichol	
"Rock and Roll Is Dead"	1995	Ruvén Afanador	
"Circus" (version 1)	1995	Ruvén Afanador	
"Circus" (version 2)	1996	Martyn Atkins	
"Can't Get You Off My Mind" (version 1)	1996	Matthew Rolston	
"Can't Get You Off My Mind" (version 2)	1996	Jim Gable	
"If You Can't Say No"	1998	Mark Romanek	
"Thinking of You"	1998	Matthew Rolston	
"I Belong to You"	1998	Mark Seliger, Fred Woodward	
"Fly Away"	1998	Paul Hunter	
"American Woman"	1999	Paul Hunter	
"Black Velveteen"	2000	Samuel Bayer	
"Again"	2000	Paul Hunter	
"Dig In"	2001	Samuel Bayer	
"Stillness of Heart"	2002	Mark Seliger	
"Believe in Me"	2002	Matthew Rolston	
"If I Could Fall in Love"	2002	Jonas Åkerlund	
"Yesterday Is Gone (My Dear Kay)"	2002	unknown	
"Where Are We Runnin'?"	2004	Philip Andelman, Lenny Kravitz	
"California"	2004	Philip Andelman	
"Storm" (remix) (featuring Jay-Z)	2004	Sanaa Hamri	
"Lady"	2004	Philip Andelman	
"Calling All Angels"	2004	Philip Andelman, Lenny Kravitz	
"I'll Be Waiting"	2008	Philip Andelman	
"Love Love Love"	2008	Philip Andelman	
"Dancin' Til Dawn"	2009	Jean-Baptiste Mondino	
"Let Love Rule" (remix) (Lenny Kravitz vs. Justice)	2009	Keith Schofield	
"Come On Get It"	2011	unknown	
"Stand"	2011	Paul Hunter	
"Push"	2011	Mathieu Bitton	
"Dream"	2011	Mathieu Bitton	
"The Chamber"	2014	Anthony Mandler	
"New York City"	2014	Francesco Carrozzini	
"Sex"	2015	Dikayl Rimmasch	
"The Pleasure and the Pain"	2015	Dikayl Rimmasch	
"It's Enough"	2018	Mikey Eaton	
"Low"	2018	Jean Baptiste Mondino	
"5 More Days til Summer"	2019	Noah Becker	
"Here To Love"	2019	Lenny Kravitz	
"Ride"	2020	Mark Seliger	
"Raise Vibration"	2021	Mark Seliger	
"TK421"	2023	Tanu Muino	
"Human"	2024	Joseph Kahn	
"Paralyzed"	2024	Anthony Mandler	
"Honey"	2024	Diana Kunst	

== Other appearances ==
Other notable works in Kravitz's repertoire are numerous charity albums and collaborations with artists of a wide range of genres. In 1990, he co-wrote and co-produced Madonna's "Justify My Love" single, for which he also provided background vocals. Kravitz sang a duet titled "Main Squeeze" with Teena Marie on her album Passion Play (Sarai Label, 1994). Upon her death, he posted a heartfelt tribute to her saying that she had contributed so much to who he is. In 1993 he appeared on Duff McKagan's debut album, Believe in Me, singing lead vocals on the song "The Majority". He has participated in numerous soundtracks, such as Reality Bites (1994), Austin Powers: The Spy Who Shagged Me (1999), and Bad Boys II (2003). He contributed tracks to Power of Soul: A Tribute to Jimi Hendrix and Goin' Home: A Tribute to Fats Domino. The 2004 album The Unplugged Collection, Volume One features a live version of "Are You Gonna Go My Way". In 2008, he wrote "Change" for the Change Is Now: Renewing America's Promise compilation album. Two of Kravitz's songs are featured separately on two different albums of the Big Shiny Tunes compilation series ("Fly Away" on Big Shiny Tunes 3 and "American Woman" on Big Shiny Tunes 4). He also appeared on Michael Jackson's posthumous track "(I Can't Make It) Another Day". Kravitz co-wrote most of the self-titled 1992 album by Vanessa Paradis, which produced the worldwide hit "Be My Baby".
