= If I Could Fall in Love =

2002 single by Lenny Kravitz

Single by Lenny Kravitz

from the album Lenny
- Released: July 29, 2002
- Genre: Rock
- Length: 4:12
- Label: Virgin
- Songwriter(s): Lenny Kravitz; Craig Ross
- Producer(s): Lenny Kravitz; Craig Ross

Lenny Kravitz singles chronology
"Believe in Me" (2002)	"If I Could Fall in Love" (2002)	"Yesterday Is Gone (My Dear Kay)" (2002)

"If I Could Fall in Love" is the fourth single (third in the United States) from American rock musician Lenny Kravitz's sixth studio album, Lenny (2001). released on July 29, 2002, by Virgin Records. The single was part of the soundtrack of the film Blue Crush (2002), as the main theme.

== Music video ==
The music video features Lenny performing the song in various locations including a beach and a swimming pool. Amplifiers and speakers are set up to give the viewers the impression that they are attending a special concert. The actors of the film Blue Crush, including Kate Bosworth and Michelle Rodriguez, appear on the beach in various movie clips intertwined with the music video.

== Track listing ==
European maxi-CD single

1. "If I Could Fall in Love" (vocal up) – 4:12
2. "If I Could Fall in Love" (album version) – 4:24
3. "Stillness of Heart" (Amsterdam acoustic version) – 8:16
4. "If I Could Fall in Love" (video) – 10:50

== Charts ==
Chart (2002–2003)	Peak position
Hungary (Single Top 40)	13
Italy (FIMI)	31
Netherlands (Single Top 100)	98
Switzerland (Schweizer Hitparade)	85
US Adult Pop Airplay (Billboard)	40

== Release history ==
Region	Date	Format(s)	Label(s)	Ref.
United States	July 29, 2002	Hot adult contemporary; mainstream rock; alternative; triple A radio	Virgin	
Australia	November 18, 2002	CD	Virgin	
