= Grammy Award for Best Male Rock Vocal Performance =

Honor presented to male recording artists for quality rock vocal performances

- Awarded for: Quality male vocal performances in the rock music genre
- Country: United States
- Presented by: National Academy of Recording Arts and Sciences
- First award: 1980
- Final award: 2004
- Currently held by: Dave Matthews, "Gravedigger" (2004)
- Website: grammy.com

The Grammy Award for Best Male Rock Vocal Performance was a Grammy Award presented to male recording artists for works (songs or albums) containing quality vocal performances in the rock music genre. Originally called the Grammy Award for Best Rock Vocal Performance, Male, the award was first presented to Bob Dylan in 1980. Beginning with the 1995 ceremony, the name of the award was changed to Best Male Rock Vocal Performance. However, in 1988, 1992, 1994, and since 2005, this category was combined with the Grammy Award for Best Female Rock Vocal Performance and presented in a genderless category known as Best Rock Vocal Performance, Solo. The solo category was later renamed to Best Solo Rock Vocal Performance beginning in 2005. This fusion has been criticized, especially when females are not nominated under the solo category. The Academy has cited a lack of eligible recordings in the female rock category as the reason for the mergers. While the award has not been presented since the category merge in 2005, an official confirmation of its retirement has not been announced.

Lenny Kravitz holds the record for the most wins in this category, with a total of four consecutive wins from 1999 to 2002. Bruce Springsteen has been presented the award three times, and two-time winners include Eric Clapton, Bob Dylan, Don Henley, and Robert Palmer. Since its inception, American artists have been presented with the award more than any other nationality, though it has been presented to musicians from the United Kingdom four times, from Australia once, and from South Africa once.

== Recipients ==
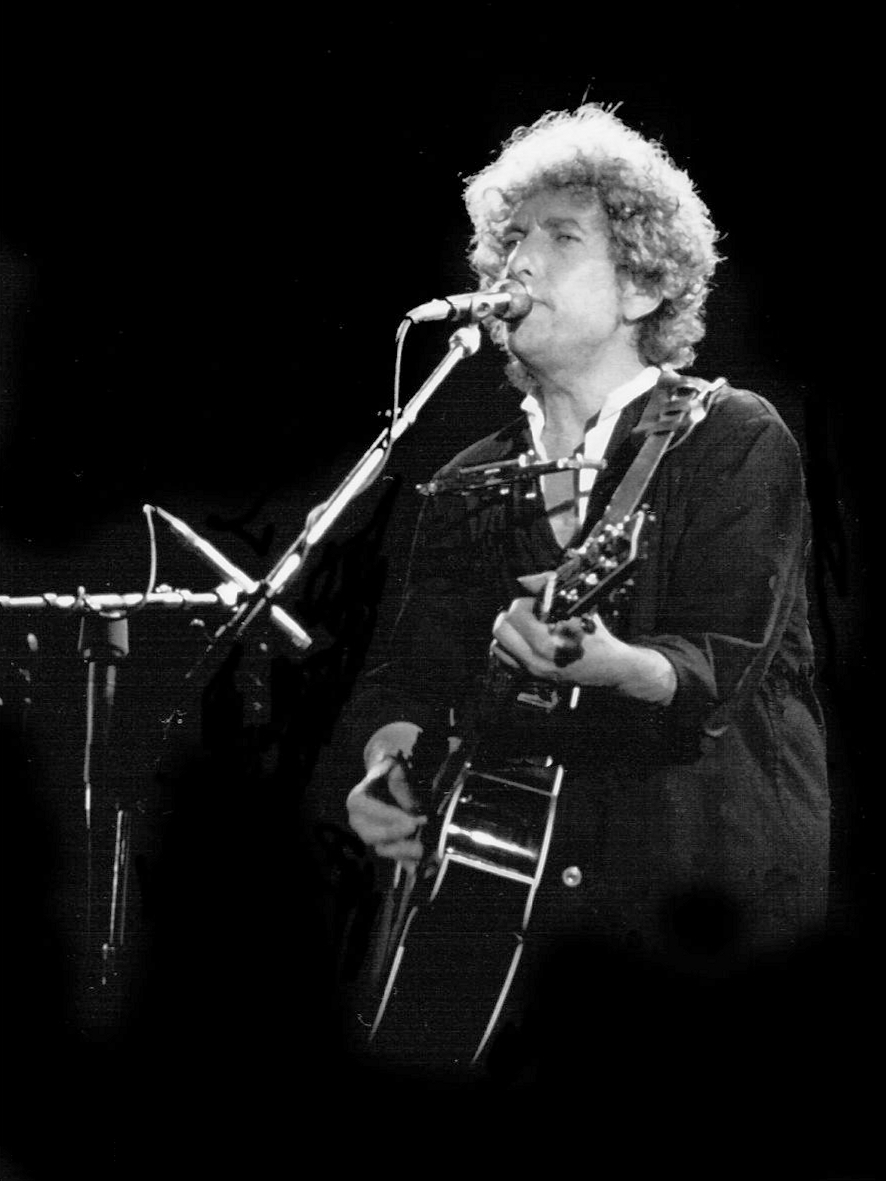
Two-time award winner Bob Dylan

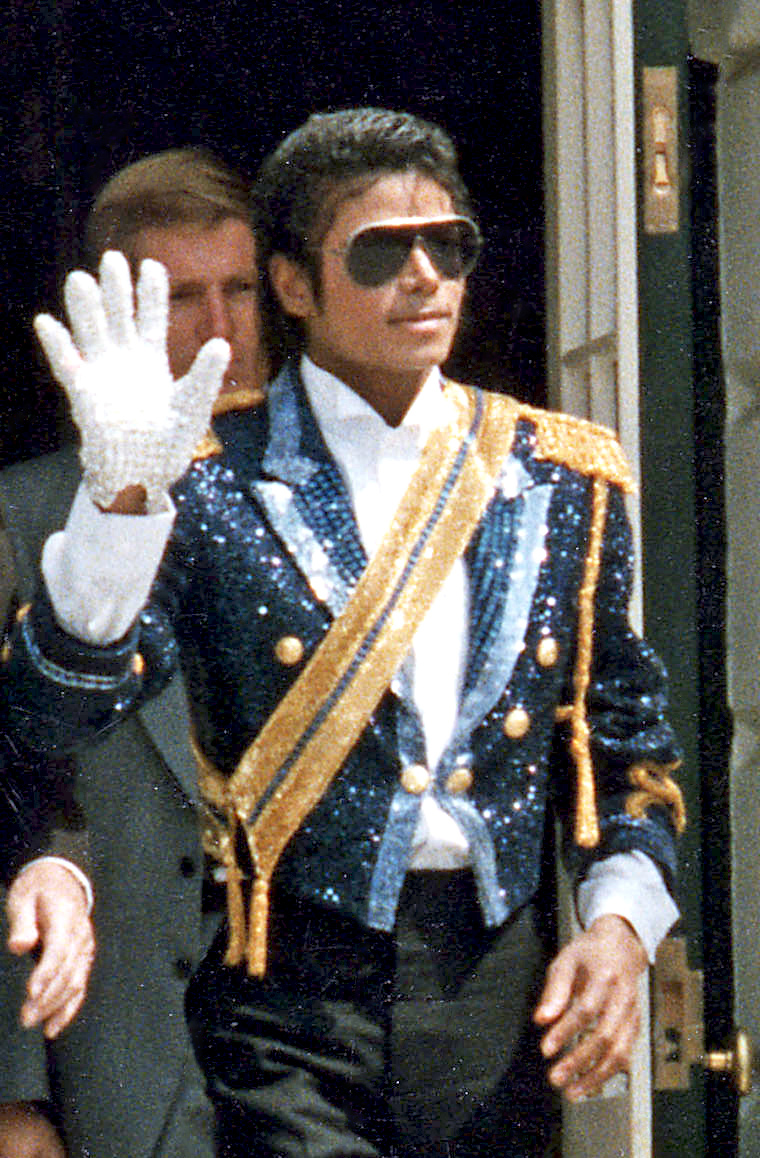
1984 award winner, Michael Jackson

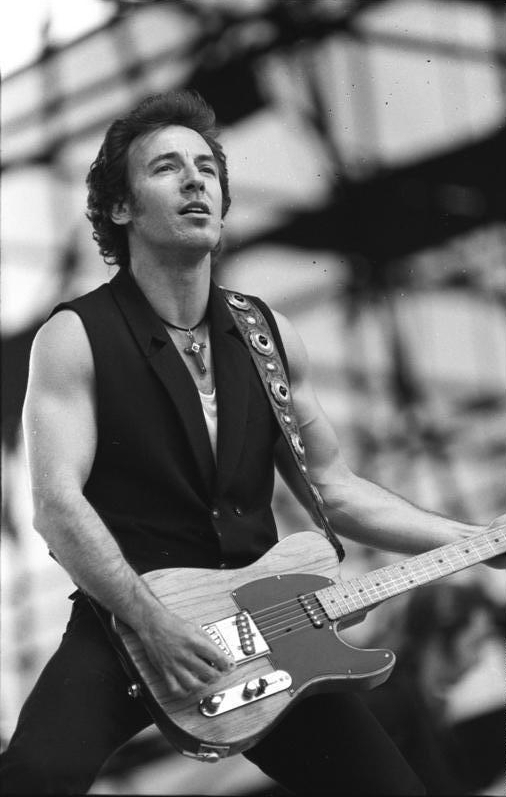
Three-time award winner Bruce Springsteen

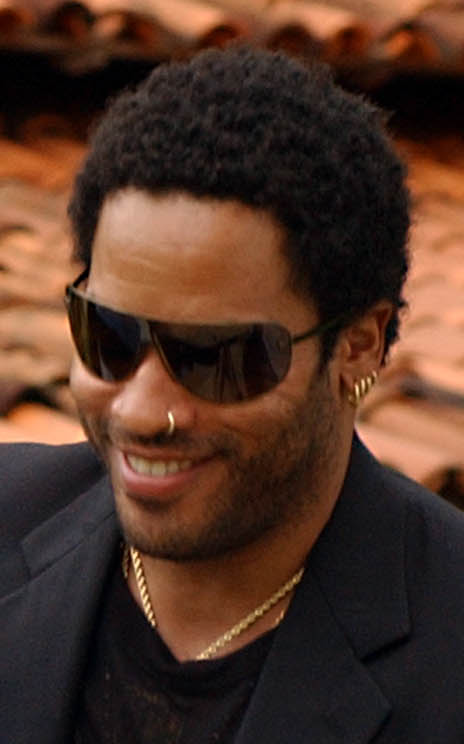
Four-time award winner Lenny Kravitz

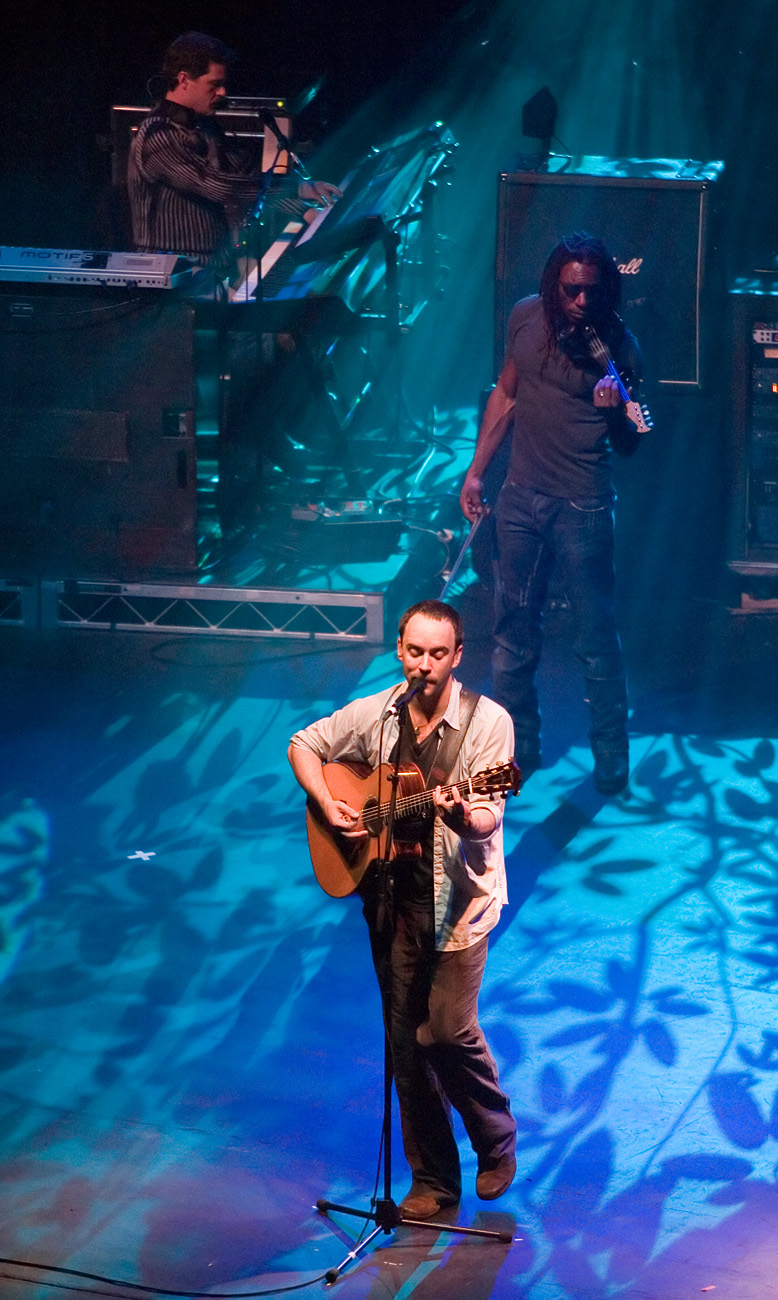
Dave Matthews, the most recent award recipient, performing with the Dave Matthews Band

Year^{[I]}	Performing artist	Work	Nominees	Ref.
1980	Bob Dylan	"Gotta Serve Somebody"	Joe Jackson – "Is She Really Going Out with Him?"; Robert Palmer – "Bad Case of Loving You (Doctor, Doctor)"; Rod Stewart – "Blondes Have More Fun"; Frank Zappa – "Dancin' Fool"	
1981	Billy Joel	Glass Houses	Jackson Browne – "Boulevard"; Kenny Loggins – "I'm Alright"; Paul McCartney – "Coming Up"; Bruce Springsteen – "Devil with the Blue Dress" / "Good Golly Miss Molly" / "Jenny Take a Ride"	
1982	Rick Springfield	"Jessie's Girl"	Gary U.S. Bonds – Dedication; Rick James – "Super Freak"; Bruce Springsteen – The River; Rod Stewart – "Young Turks"	
1983	John Mellencamp	"Hurts So Good"	Peter Gabriel – "Shock the Monkey"; Don Henley – "Dirty Laundry"; Rick Springfield – "I Get Excited"; Rod Stewart – Tonight I'm Yours	
1984	Michael Jackson	"Beat It"	David Bowie – "Cat People (Putting Out Fire)"; Phil Collins – "I Don't Care Anymore"; Bob Seger – The Distance; Rick Springfield – "Affair of the Heart"	
1985	Bruce Springsteen	"Dancing in the Dark"	David Bowie – "Blue Jean"; Billy Idol – "Rebel Yell"; Elton John – "Restless"; John Cougar Mellencamp – "Pink Houses"	
1986	Don Henley	"The Boys of Summer"	Bryan Adams – Reckless; John Fogerty – Centerfield; Mick Jagger – "Just Another Night"; John Cougar Mellencamp – Scarecrow	
1987	Robert Palmer	"Addicted to Love"	John Fogerty – Eye of the Zombie; Peter Gabriel – "Sledgehammer"; Billy Idol – "To Be a Lover"; Eddie Money – "Take Me Home Tonight"	
1988^{[II]}
1989	Robert Palmer	"Simply Irresistible"	Eric Clapton – "After Midnight"; Joe Cocker – Unchain My Heart; Robbie Robertson – Robbie Robertson; Rod Stewart – "Forever Young"	
1990	Don Henley	The End of the Innocence	Joe Cocker – "When the Night Comes"; Tom Petty – "Free Fallin'"; Lou Reed – New York; Neil Young – Freedom	
1991	Eric Clapton	"Bad Love"	Jon Bon Jovi – "Blaze of Glory"; Joe Cocker – "You Can Leave Your Hat On"; Billy Idol – "Cradle of Love"; Neil Young – "Rockin' in the Free World"	
1992^{[II]}
1993	Eric Clapton	Unplugged	Bryan Adams – "There Will Never Be Another Tonight"; Tom Cochrane – "Life Is a Highway"; Peter Gabriel – "Digging in the Dirt"; Bob Seger – "The Fire Inside"; Bruce Springsteen – Human Touch	
1994^{[II]}
1995	Bruce Springsteen	"Streets of Philadelphia"	Beck – "Loser"; Peter Gabriel – "Red Rain (Live)"; Van Morrison – "In the Garden" / "You Send Me"; Neil Young – "Philadelphia"	
1996	Tom Petty	"You Don't Know How It Feels"	Bob Dylan – "Knockin' on Heaven's Door"; Chris Isaak – "Somebody's Crying"; Lenny Kravitz – "Rock and Roll Is Dead"; Neil Young – "Peace and Love"	
1997	Beck	"Where It's At"	Bryan Adams – "The Only Thing That Looks Good on Me Is You"; Eric Clapton – "Ain't Gone 'N Give Up On Your Love"; John Hiatt – "Cry Love"; Bruce Springsteen – "Dead Man Walkin'"	
1998	Bob Dylan	"Cold Irons Bound"	David Bowie – "Dead Man Walking"; John Fogerty – "Blueboy"; John Mellencamp – "Just Another Day"; Bruce Springsteen – "Thunder Road"	
1999	Lenny Kravitz	"Fly Away"	Jeff Buckley – "Everybody Here Wants You"; John Fogerty – "Almost Saturday Night"; John Hiatt – "Have a Little Faith in Me"; John Mellencamp – "Your Life Is Now"	
2000	Lenny Kravitz	"American Woman"	Chris Cornell – "Can't Change Me"; Everlast – "What It's Like"; Bruce Springsteen – "The Promise"; Tom Waits – "Hold On"	
2001	Lenny Kravitz	"Again"	David Bowie – "Thursday's Child"; Bob Dylan – "Things Have Changed"; Don Henley – "Workin' It"; Nine Inch Nails – "Into the Void"	
2002	Lenny Kravitz	"Dig In"	Ryan Adams – "New York, New York"; Eric Clapton – "Superman inside"; Bob Dylan – "Honest with Me"; John Mellencamp – "Peaceful World"	
2003	Bruce Springsteen	"The Rising"	David Bowie – "Slow Burn"; Elvis Costello – "45"; Peter Gabriel – "The Barry Williams Show"; Robert Plant – "Darkness, Darkness"	
2004	Dave Matthews	"Gravedigger"	David Bowie – "New Killer Star"; Bob Dylan – "Down in the Flood"; Lenny Kravitz – "If I Could Fall in Love"; Tom Waits – "Return of Jackie and Judy"	

^{^[I]} Each year is linked to the article about the Grammy Awards held that year.
^{^[II]} Award was combined with the Best Female Rock Vocal Performance category and presented in a genderless category known as Best Rock Vocal Performance, Solo.

== Multiple wins ==
4 wins

- Lenny Kravitz

3 wins

- Bruce Springsteen

2 wins

- Bob Dylan
- Eric Clapton
- Don Henley
- Robert Palmer

== Multiple nominations ==
9 nominations

- Bruce Springsteen

6 nominations

- Bob Dylan
- David Bowie
- John Mellencamp
- Lenny Kravitz

5 nominations

- Peter Gabriel
- Eric Clapton

4 nominations

- Rod Stewart
- Don Henley
- John Fogerty
- Neil Young

3 nominations

- Robert Palmer
- Rick Springfield
- Billy Idol
- Bryan Adams
- Joe Cocker

2 nominations

- Bob Seger
- Tom Petty
- Beck
- John Hiatt
- Tom Waits

== See also ==
- American rock
