= Believe in Me (Lenny Kravitz song) =

2002 single by Lenny Kravitz

Single by Lenny Kravitz

from the album Lenny
- Released: April 23, 2002
- Length: 3:52
- Label: Virgin America
- Songwriter(s): Lenny Kravitz
- Producer(s): Lenny Kravitz

Lenny Kravitz singles chronology
| "Stillness of Heart" (2002) | "Believe in Me" (2002) | "If I Could Fall in Love" (2002) |

"Believe in Me" is the third single by American rock musician Lenny Kravitz from his 2001 sixth self-titled studio album Lenny, released on April 23, 2002, by Virgin Records America.

== Chart performance ==
The single performed very well on the European countries, being the most successful single of the album in Austria (where it peaked at number 42), Portugal (where it peaked at number six), the Netherlands (where it reached number seven), and Switzerland (where it reached number 29). In Italy, it reached the top 10, becoming the second song of the album to reach the top 10 there.

== Music video ==
The music video features Lenny performing in a small club setting in front of an audience full of people of different ages, races and walks of life. Kravitz is singing soulfully to the woman that he is in love with, while flashing images of the Virgin Mary and Jesus Christ appear in the club. Another scene shows back and forth imaging of the woman and of a shirtless, frustrated Kravitz boxing and lifting weights in his exercise room. The instrumental bridge features choreographed break dancers as Kravitz plays Spanish guitar, while in the end Kravitz and the woman are seen dancing together amongst the large crowd of people. The video features American model Megan Ewing.

== Track listing ==
1. "Believe in Me"
2. "Yesterday Is Gone (My Dear Kay)"
3. "A Million Miles Away"
4. "Stillness of Heart" (Video)

== Charts ==
=== Weekly charts ===
| Chart (2002) | Peak position |
|---|---|
| Austria (Ö3 Austria Top 40) | 42 |
| Belgium (Ultratip Bubbling Under Flanders) | 8 |
| Europe (Eurochart Hot 100) | 46 |
| Germany (GfK) | 14 |
| Italy (FIMI) | 10 |
| Netherlands (Dutch Top 40) | 7 |
| Netherlands (Single Top 100) | 10 |
| Portugal (AFP) | 6 |
| Switzerland (Schweizer Hitparade) | 29 |

=== Year-end charts ===
| Chart (2002) | Position |
|---|---|
| Germany (Media Control) | 52 |
| Netherlands (Dutch Top 40) | 37 |
| Netherlands (Single Top 100) | 66 |
| Switzerland (Schweizer Hitparade) | 75 |
