= Dig In =

2001 single by Lenny Kravitz

Single by Lenny Kravitz

from the album Lenny
- B-side: "Rosemary"; "Can't Get You Off My Mind" (acoustic)
- Released: September 10, 2001
- Genre: Rock
- Length: 3:37
- Label: Virgin
- Songwriter: Lenny Kravitz
- Producer: Lenny Kravitz

Lenny Kravitz singles chronology
"Again" (2000)	"Dig In" (2001)	"Stillness of Heart" (2002)

"Dig In" is a song by American singer-songwriter Lenny Kravitz, the lead single from his sixth studio album, Lenny (2001). It was released in September 2001. It was used in promos by the National Basketball Association for the 2002 NBA Playoffs, as well as the ending theme for the 2002 Japanese science fiction film Returner.

== Reception ==
In 2016, Carla Hay of AXS stated, "It’s got all the elements of a classic Kravitz rock song, including an addictive chorus and great rhythm. It’s hard to forget this song once you’ve heard it."

== Chart performance ==
"Dig In" is one of the most successful songs by Lenny Kravitz in the United States. In addition to its number 31 peak on the Billboard Hot 100 in December 2001, it peaked at number 13 on Billboard's Hot Modern Rock Tracks chart. In Europe, the single entered several charts, including those of Italy, Portugal, and Spain, reaching the top 10 in these regions.

== Music video ==
The music video was directed by Samuel Bayer, who also directed "Black Velveteen" for Kravitz. The video starts with a QVC-like program with a woman selling products such as expensive jewelry. Suddenly, there is a signal interference that leads to show Kravitz and his band performance at a floating base in the sea, while they are being surrounded by a helicopter. Much of the music video has special effects designed to make the video seem to have tracking issues.

== Awards ==
Kravitz was awarded the Grammy Award for Best Male Rock Vocal Performance at the 44th Annual Grammy Awards in 2002 for his performance on this song. It was his fourth consecutive win of this award.

== Track listings ==
UK and Australian CD single

1. "Dig In" – 3:37
2. "Rosemary" – 5:34
3. "Can't Get You Off My Mind" (acoustic) – 4:37

European CD single

1. "Dig In" – 3:37
2. "Can't Get You Off My Mind" (acoustic) – 4:37

== Charts ==
=== Weekly charts ===
Chart (2001–2002)	Peak position
Austria (Ö3 Austria Top 40)	64
Belgium (Ultratip Bubbling Under Flanders)	17
Canada (BDS)	10
Italy (FIMI)	8
Netherlands (Dutch Top 40)	40
Netherlands (Single Top 100)	72
New Zealand (Recorded Music NZ)	48
Portugal (AFP)	6
Spain (Promusicae)	9
Sweden (Sverigetopplistan)	48
Switzerland (Schweizer Hitparade)	58
US Billboard Hot 100	31
US Adult Alternative Airplay (Billboard)	2
US Adult Pop Airplay (Billboard)	7
US Alternative Airplay (Billboard)	13
US Mainstream Rock (Billboard)	11
US Pop Airplay (Billboard)	17

=== Year-end charts ===
Chart (2001)	Position
Canada Radio (Nielsen BDS)	58
US Adult Top 40 (Billboard)	81
US Modern Rock Tracks (Billboard)	69

Chart (2002)	Position
Canada Radio (Nielsen BDS)	85
US Adult Top 40 (Billboard)	26
US Mainstream Top 40 (Billboard)	85
US Triple-A (Billboard)	32

== Release history ==
Region	Date	Format(s)	Label(s)	Ref.
United States	September 10, 2001	Triple A radio	Virgin	
United States	September 11, 2001	Mainstream rock; active rock; alternative radio	Virgin	
Australia	November 12, 2001	CD	Virgin	
Japan	November 21, 2001	CD	Virgin	
United Kingdom	November 26, 2001	CD	Virgin	
