= Lenny (album) =

Studio album by Lenny Kravitz
- Released: October 30, 2001
- Genres: Psychedelic rock; pop rock
- Length: 50:21
- Label: Virgin
- Producer: Lenny Kravitz

Lenny Kravitz chronology
Greatest Hits (2000)	Lenny (2001)	Baptism (2004)

Singles from Lenny
- 1. "Dig In" Released: September 10, 2001; 2. "Stillness of Heart" Released: January 14, 2002; 3. "Believe in Me" Released: April 23, 2002; 4. "If I Could Fall in Love" Released: July 29, 2002

Lenny is the sixth studio album by American rock musician Lenny Kravitz, released in October 2001 through Virgin Records. It reached number 12 on the Billboard 200 and number 55 on the UK Albums Chart.

The lead single, "Dig In", which reached number 31 on the US Billboard Hot 100, was the album's most successful song that helped Kravitz win his fourth consecutive Grammy Award for Best Male Rock Vocal Performance, while the song "If I Could Fall in Love" was featured on the Blue Crush soundtrack and gave Kravitz yet another nomination in the aforementioned category in 2003.

== Album background ==
Stephen Thomas Erlewine wrote for AllMusic that "5 gave Lenny Kravitz a career revival, thanks to a really big hit with 'Fly Away', and he followed it with a hit, the cover of the Guess Who's 'American Woman', which surely benefited from its presence on the blockbuster Austin Powers: The Spy Who Shagged Me. Then, he threw out 'Again' as a new track for Greatest Hits (wh[ich] sold over 3,000,000 copies worldwide), setting the stage for the return to form that's Lenny." Kravitz has joined the ranks of Michael Jackson, Prince, George Michael, writing, arranging, producing and performing every song on the album, creating a minimalist one-man show of acoustic and electric guitars, live percussion and drum programming.

=== Music ===
The opening track, "Battlefield of Love", is built around a rudimentary guitar riff reminiscent of Grand Funk Railroad—on which Lenny incorporates a wah-wah solo into the mix. Fourth single "If I Could Fall in Love" and first single (described as "a gritty rocker" by Slant) "Dig In" make use of electric guitar work, with simple structures and pop melodies that have become Kravitz staples. Slant also said "'Dig In' evokes Sheryl Crow at times—only with slightly less keen lyrical content." "Yesterday Is Gone" was said by Entertainment Weekly to have a "Beatles feel, but [it] no longer feels like [Lenny's] consciously trying to rewrite 'Tomorrow Never Knows'." Slant elaborated further, "Kravitz's neo-hippie sentiments abound on tracks like 'God Save Us All' and 'Stillness of Heart' ('I'm feeling incomplete/What am I buying/My soul is crying')." "The stripped-down approach works well throughout the plaintive ballad 'Believe in Me', which sounds like a low-tech Seal song. The amusingly Chuck Berry-ish story line of the hard-charging 'Bank Robber Man', is based on a real-life incident in which the star was mistaken for a criminal and busted by Miami police officers last year. Do you think that I'm the one that did it/Just because I'm tan?/Just then the officer at hand said/'I don't give a damn that you are in a rock and roll band,' Kravitz sings, and for once the social commentary doesn't feel contrived."

== Reception ==
Professional ratings
Aggregate scores
Source	Rating
Metacritic	69/100
Review scores
Source	Rating
AllMusic	4/5 stars
Blender	3/5 stars
Drowned in Sound	1/10
Encyclopedia of Popular Music	3/5 stars
Entertainment Weekly	B−
Q	4/5 stars
Rolling Stone	3.5/5 stars
Slant Magazine	3/5 stars
Spin	6/10
USA Today	3/4 stars

Initial critical response to Lenny was positive. At Metacritic, which assigns a normalized rating out of 100 to reviews from mainstream critics, the album has received an average score of 69, based on 12 reviews, which indicates "generally favorable reviews".

Stephen Thomas Erlewine wrote a positive review for AllMusic, commenting that "There may not be singles that are as immediately grabbing as "It Ain't Over 'til It's Over", "Let Love Rule" and "Are You Gonna Go My Way", but there are no dull spots, either, and this easily stands alongside his first three albums as a set of classy, near-irresistible pop for listeners weaned on classic and college rock, which is a wholly welcome surprise." Tom Sinclair wrote for Entertainment Weekly that "While it's hard not to wish that Kravitz's music was just a few degrees better than it actually is, he has improved over the years." Graham Reed of Drowned in Sound wrote a negative review, stating "If you love music, take a hammer, and smash every copy you can find. You’ll be doing the world a favour. This is the exact antithesis of everything music stands for. Its stale, unoriginal, formulaic, repetitive, and shows as much originality and passion as a tribute band. There’s thousands of musicians out there with more originality and passion out there than Lenny. This is nothing more than a self-indulgent, artistic void of turd poured into plastic".

Sal Cinquemani wrote for Slant Magazine that "the singer's classic rock influence (and devoted recreation of it) is once again evident on Lenny, with tracks like "Yesterday Is Gone" and "A Million Miles Away" recalling the crisp harmonies of John Lennon and the electric guitar riffs of Jimi Hendrix." Billboard wrote that "It's an invigorating, electric blend that is pushed over the top by lyrics that are smart and spiritual without ever pressing too hard." Blender commented about "its 12 tracks", writing that "they are unusually raucous and raw, as Kravitz finds a comfort zone with turbocharged punk and arena rock." Rolling Stone perceived that "Nothing on Lenny can match "Again", but he gets close sometimes, lumbering with a meatball sense of purpose that's all his own." While Q magazine concluded that "As before, it's a heady swirl of rock, soul and hippy lyrics. However, it feels fantastic and, unless the record company is snoring soundly, it's full of hits."

== Track listing ==
All songs composed by Lenny Kravitz except where noted.

1. "Battlefield of Love" – 3:14
2. "If I Could Fall in Love" (Lenny Kravitz, Craig Ross) – 4:21
3. "Yesterday Is Gone (My Dear Kay)" – 3:52
4. "Stillness of Heart" (Lenny Kravitz, Craig Ross) – 4:15
5. "Believe in Me" (Lenny Kravitz, Henry Hirsch) – 4:41
6. "Pay to Play" – 2:49
7. "A Million Miles Away" – 4:32
8. "God Save Us All" – 3:53
9. "Dig In" – 3:37
10. "You Were in My Heart" – 5:29
11. "Bank Robber Man" – 3:31
12. "Let's Get High" – 5:39 (Contains 1:20min Dead End)
13. "Again" (Stankonia remix featuring Outkast) – 4:09 (Japanese bonus track)

Bonus Japanese acoustic CD

1. "Rosemary" – 5:35
2. "Can't Get You Off My Mind" – 4:38
3. "God Is Love" – 4:28
4. "Flowers for Zoe" – 2:48
5. "A Million Miles Away" – 4:32
6. "God Save Us All" – 3:49
7. "Yesterday Is Gone (My Dear Kay)" – 3:56
8. "Stillness of Heart" – 4:20

== Singles ==
- "Dig In" – No. 31 US Hot 100, No. 7 US Adult Top 40
- "Stillness of Heart" – No. 18 US Adult Top 40, No. 44 UK
- "Believe in Me"
- "If I Could Fall in Love" – No. 40 US Adult Top 40

== Personnel ==
Musicians

- Lenny Kravitz – vocals, electric guitar, drums, bass guitar (tracks 1–4, 7–9, 11, 12), acoustic guitar (tracks 3, 4, 7), Mini-Moog (tracks 5, 6, 10), drum programming (tracks 5, 6), stylophone (track 3), piano (track 9), timpani and orchestral cymbals (track 10), string arrangement (tracks 3, 5, 7, 8), orchestral arrangement (tracks 4, 10)
- Craig Ross – electric guitar (tracks 3, 4, 11), Hammond organ (track 3)
- Henry Hirsch – Hammond organ (track 12), string arrangement (tracks 3, 5, 7), orchestral arrangement (track 10)
- David Baron – sequenced synthesizer (track 10), string arrangement (track 7), orchestral arrangement (track 10)

Production and artwork

- Lenny Kravitz – producer, mixing
- Henry Hirsch – engineer, mixing
- Matt Knobel – Pro Tools engineer
- Alex Alvarez – studio and instrument technician
- Steve Rinkov – drum technician
- David Baron – synthesizer programming
- Len Peltier – art direction/design
- Terry Richardson – photography

== Charts ==
=== Weekly charts ===
Weekly chart performance for Lenny
Chart (2001)	Peak position
Australian Albums (ARIA)	44
Austrian Albums (Ö3 Austria)	1
Belgian Albums (Ultratop Flanders)	22
Belgian Albums (Ultratop Wallonia)	18
Canadian Albums (Billboard)	9
Danish Albums (Hitlisten)	9
Dutch Albums (Album Top 100)	7
Finnish Albums (Suomen virallinen lista)	16
French Albums (SNEP)	17
German Albums (Offizielle Top 100)	5
Greek Albums (IFPI Greece)	1
Hungarian Albums (MAHASZ)	31
Irish Albums (IRMA)	65
Italian Albums (FIMI)	6
Japanese Albums (Oricon)	6
New Zealand Albums (RMNZ)	22
Norwegian Albums (VG-lista)	14
Scottish Albums (Official Charts)	65
Spanish Albums (AFYVE)	12
Swedish Albums (Sverigetopplistan)	5
Swiss Albums (Schweizer Hitparade)	3
UK Albums (Official Charts)	55
US Billboard 200	12

=== Year-end charts ===
2001 year-end chart performance for Lenny
Chart (2001)	Position
Austrian Albums (Ö3 Austria)	55
Canadian Albums (Nielsen SoundScan)	136
Dutch Albums (Album Top 100)	96
Italian Albums (FIMI)	39
Swedish Albums (Sverigetopplistan)	88

2002 year-end chart performance for Lenny
Chart (2002)	Position
Austrian Albums (Ö3 Austria)	35
Canadian Alternative Albums (Nielsen SoundScan)	79
German Albums (Offizielle Top 100)	17
Swiss Albums (Schweizer Hitparade)	39
US Billboard 200	179

== Certifications ==
Certifications for Lenny
Region	Certification	Certified units/sales
Argentina (CAPIF)	Gold	20,000^{^}
Austria (IFPI Austria)	Gold	20,000^{*}
Belgium (BRMA)	Gold	25,000^{*}
Canada (Music Canada)	Platinum	100,000^{^}
Denmark (IFPI Danmark)	Gold	25,000^{^}
Germany (BVMI)	Platinum	300,000^{^}
Italy (FIMI)	2× Platinum	200,000^{*}
Japan (RIAJ)	Gold	100,000^{^}
Netherlands (NVPI)	Gold	40,000^{^}
Spain (Promusicae)	Platinum	100,000^{^}
Switzerland (IFPI Switzerland)	Platinum	40,000^{^}
United States (RIAA)	Platinum	1,000,000^{^}
Summaries
Europe (IFPI)	Platinum	1,000,000^{*}
^{*} Sales figures based on certification alone.^{^} Shipments figures based on certification alone.
