= Greatest Hits (Lenny Kravitz album) =

Greatest hits album by Lenny Kravitz
- Released: October 24, 2000
- Recorded: 1988–2000
- Length: 62:25 (main edition); 68:43 (limited tour edition)
- Label: Virgin
- Producer: Lenny Kravitz

Lenny Kravitz chronology
5 (1998)	Greatest Hits (2000)	Lenny (2001)

Singles from Greatest Hits
- 1. "Again" Released: September 22, 2000

Professional ratings
Review scores
Source	Rating
AllMusic	4.5/5 stars
Encyclopedia of Popular Music	4/5 stars
Entertainment Weekly	C+
laut.de	3/5 stars
Robert Christgau	(dud)

Greatest Hits is a greatest hits album by American rock musician Lenny Kravitz, released on October 24, 2000.

== Background ==
The album features an unreleased track for promotion called "Again", which became a hit, reaching number 4 on the Billboard Hot 100, following a very successful string of hits from the album 5. "Again" propelled the compilation to commercial success greater than any of his studio efforts.

Kravitz reported in an interview for VivaMusic.com that the selection of the songs were led by his record company, Virgin Records, which only chose the songs that were successful on the charts. The tracks were sequenced by Kravitz's engineer, Henry Hirsch.

The album reached number 2 on the Billboard 200 and number 12 on the UK Albums Chart.

This album has been released with the Copy Control protection system in some regions.

== Promotion ==
"Again" was released as the promotional single for this compilation, along with a music video. The single reached number four on the US Billboard Hot 100, becoming Kravitz's highest-charting song since "It Ain't Over 'Til It's Over".

== Reception ==
Stephen Thomas Erlewine of AllMusic commented "Lenny Kravitz's greatest gift is that he's a master synthesist, pulling together different sounds and styles from eras past to create a sound that isn't necessarily blazingly original, but fresh due to his craft and sheer mastery of the studio. Since he was an unabashed classicist, his records often suffered the brunt of nasty criticism, but they were often very good, particularly early in his career before he indulged in the mannerisms of guitar-blasting stadium rock... After all, it doesn't just have all the main songs, it also illustrates that he indeed is a master synthesist."

== Track listing ==
=== Original edition ===
No.	Title	Writer(s)	Original album	Length
1.	"Are You Gonna Go My Way"	Lenny Kravitz; Craig Ross	Are You Gonna Go My Way	3:30
2.	"Fly Away"	Kravitz	5	3:41
3.	"Rock and Roll Is Dead"	Kravitz	Circus	3:22
4.	"Again"	Kravitz	Previously unreleased	3:49
5.	"It Ain't Over 'til It's Over"	Kravitz	Mama Said	3:55
6.	"Can't Get You Off My Mind"	Kravitz	Circus	4:33
7.	"Mr. Cab Driver"	Kravitz	Let Love Rule	3:49
8.	"American Woman"	Burton Cummings; Michael James Kale; Garry Peterson; Randy Bachman	Austin Powers: The Spy Who Shagged Me / 5 (Re-release)	4:21
9.	"Stand by My Woman"	Kravitz; Henry Hirsch; Stephen Mark Pasch; Anthony Krizan	Mama Said	4:16
10.	"Always on the Run"	Kravitz; Saul Hudson	Mama Said	3:57
11.	"Heaven Help"	Gerry DeVeaux; Terry Britten	Are You Gonna Go My Way	3:10
12.	"I Belong to You"	Kravitz	5	4:17
13.	"Believe"	Kravitz; Hirsch	Are You Gonna Go My Way	4:50
14.	"Let Love Rule"	Kravitz	Let Love Rule	5:42
15.	"Black Velveteen"	Kravitz	5	4:48

=== Japanese edition ===
The Japan release has the song "Is There Any Love in Your Heart" appended as track 12. The tracks otherwise remained the same.

=== Greatest Hits: Limited Tour Edition ===
On November 8, 2005, the album was re-released due to Kravitz's 2005 tour, including the songs "Dig In" and "Where Are We Runnin'?", from his then-latest albums, Lenny and Baptism respectively.

CD
No.	Title	Writer(s)	Original album	Length
1.	"Are You Gonna Go My Way"	Kravitz; Ross	Are You Gonna Go My Way	3:30
2.	"Fly Away"	Kravitz	5	3:41
3.	"Rock and Roll Is Dead"	Kravitz	Circus	3:22
4.	"Again"	Kravitz	Previously unreleased	3:45
5.	"Dig In"	Kravitz	Lenny	3:43
6.	"It Ain't Over 'Til It's Over"	Kravitz	Mama Said	3:55
7.	"Can't Get You Off My Mind"	Kravitz	Circus	4:33
8.	"Mr. Cab Driver"	Kravitz	Let Love Rule	3:49
9.	"Heaven Help"	DeVeaux; Britten	Are You Gonna Go My Way	3:10
10.	"American Woman"	Burton Cummings; Michael James Kale; Garry Peterson; Randy Bachman	Austin Powers: The Spy Who Shagged Me / 5 (Re-release)	4:21
11.	"Where Are We Runnin'?"	Kravitz	Baptism	2:40
12.	"Stand By My Woman"	Kravitz; Hirsch; Stephen Mark Pasch; Anthony Krizan	Mama Said	4:16
13.	"Always on the Run"	Kravitz; Hudson	Mama Said	3:57
14.	"I Belong to You"	Kravitz	5	4:17
15.	"Believe"	Kravitz; Hirsch	Are You Gonna Go My Way	4:50
16.	"Let Love Rule"	Kravitz	Let Love Rule	5:42
17.	"Black Velveteen"	Kravitz	5	4:48

DVD

#	Title	Original album	Director	Time
1.	"Always on the Run"	Mama Said	Jesse Dylan	3:30
2.	"Are You Gonna Go My Way"	Are You Gonna Go My Way	Mark Romanek	3:41
3.	"Fly Away"	5	Paul Hunter	3:22
4.	"American Woman"	Austin Powers: The Spy Who Shagged Me (Original Soundtrack) / 5 (Re-release)	Paul Hunter	3:45
5.	"Dig In"	Lenny	Samuel Bayer	3:55
6.	"Where Are We Runnin'?"	Baptism	Philip Andelman; Lenny Kravitz	4:33

== Personnel ==
- Lenny Kravitz – vocals and lead guitar
- Craig Ross – rhythm guitar
- Cindy Blackman – drums
- Tony Breit – bass guitar

== Charts ==
=== Weekly charts ===
Chart (2000–2018)	Peak position
Australian Albums (ARIA)	14
Austrian Albums (Ö3 Austria)	1
Belgian Albums (Ultratop Flanders)	8
Belgian Albums (Ultratop Wallonia)	11
Canadian Albums (Billboard)	2
Colombian Albums (ASINCOL)	2
Danish Albums (Hitlisten)	14
Dutch Albums (Album Top 100)	4
Finnish Albums (Suomen virallinen lista)	1
French Albums (SNEP)	89
German Albums (Offizielle Top 100)	2
Hungarian Albums (MAHASZ)	12
Irish Albums (IRMA)	7
Italian Albums (FIMI)	1
Japanese Albums (Oricon)	5
New Zealand Albums (RMNZ)	2
Norwegian Albums (VG-lista)	6
Portuguese Albums (AFP)	34
Scottish Albums (Official Charts)	11
Spanish Albums (AFYVE)	8
Swedish Albums (Sverigetopplistan)	5
Swiss Albums (Schweizer Hitparade)	2
UK Albums (Official Charts)	12
US Billboard 200	2

=== Year-end charts ===
Year-end chart performance for Greatest Hits by Lenny Kravitz
Chart (2000)	Position
Australian Albums (ARIA)	50
Austrian Albums (Ö3 Austria)	20
Belgian Albums (Ultratop Flanders)	60
Belgian Albums (Ultratop Wallonia)	84
Canadian Albums (Nielsen SoundScan)	20
Dutch Albums (Album Top 100)	33
European Albums (Music & Media)	43
French Compilations (SNEP)	7
German Albums (Offizielle Top 100)	57
Italian Albums (FIMI)	8
Swiss Albums (Schweizer Hitparade)	16
UK Albums (OCC)	72

Chart (2001)	Position
Australian Albums (ARIA)	24
Austrian Albums (Ö3 Austria)	28
Belgian Albums (Ultratop Flanders)	54
Belgian Albums (Ultratop Wallonia)	59
Canadian Albums (Nielsen SoundScan)	41
Dutch Albums (Album Top 100)	27
German Albums (Offizielle Top 100)	57
Italian Albums (FIMI)	44
New Zealand Albums (RMNZ)	25
Swedish Albums (Sverigetopplistan)	46
Swiss Albums (Schweizer Hitparade)	32
US Billboard 200	18

Chart (2002)	Position
Canadian Alternative Albums (Nielsen SoundScan)	71
German Albums (Offizielle Top 100)	72
US Billboard 200	194

=== Decade-end charts ===
Chart (2000–2009)	Position
US Billboard 200	82

== Certifications ==
Region	Certification	Certified units/sales
Argentina (CAPIF)	2× Platinum	120,000^{^}
Australia (ARIA)	2× Platinum	140,000^{^}
Austria (IFPI Austria)	Platinum	50,000^{*}
Belgium (BRMA)	3× Platinum	150,000^{*}
Brazil	—	248,000
Canada (Music Canada)	4× Platinum	400,000^{^}
Denmark (IFPI Danmark)	Gold	25,000^{^}
Finland (Musiikkituottajat)	Gold	20,587
France (SNEP)	Platinum	300,000^{*}
Germany (BVMI)	2× Platinum	600,000^{^}
Italy (FIMI) sales since 2009	Platinum	50,000^{‡}
Japan (RIAJ)	Platinum	200,000^{^}
Mexico (AMPROFON)	Gold	75,000^{^}
Netherlands (NVPI)	Platinum	80,000^{^}
New Zealand (RMNZ)	3× Platinum	45,000^{^}
Norway (IFPI Norway)	Platinum	50,000^{*}
Poland (ZPAV)	Platinum	70,000^{*}
Spain (Promusicae)	2× Platinum	200,000^{^}
Sweden (GLF)	Platinum	80,000^{^}
Switzerland (IFPI Switzerland)	Platinum	50,000^{^}
United Kingdom (BPI)	2× Platinum	600,000^{‡}
United States (RIAA)	3× Platinum	3,900,000
Uruguay (CUD)	Platinum	6,000^{^}
Summaries
Europe (IFPI)	3× Platinum	3,000,000^{*}
Worldwide	—	10,000,000
^{*} Sales figures based on certification alone.^{^} Shipments figures based on certification alone.^{‡} Sales+streaming figures based on certification alone.
