= Black Velveteen =

1999 song by Lenny Kravitz

- One of artworks for non-US releases

Single by Lenny Kravitz

from the album 5
- Released: November 29, 1999
- Length: 4:48
- Label: Virgin
- Songwriter: Lenny Kravitz
- Producer: Lenny Kravitz

Lenny Kravitz singles chronology
"American Woman" (1999)	"Black Velveteen" (1999)	"Again" (2000)

Music video
- "Lenny Kravitz - Black Velveteen" on YouTube

"Black Velveteen" is the sixth and last single to be released from the 5 album by American rock musician Lenny Kravitz. It was released on November 29, 1999. The song was also used to promote his Greatest Hits album.

== Composition ==
Lenny Kravitz on the inspiration for "Black Velveteen" in an interview from 2000:

"Black Velveteen" is about technology and we're getting so pulled in by computers and technology and our kids have their face in the computers all day. We have our face in computers all day and the human relationship is being diminished by this so I figured, well ok, we're so into computers, and we're so into technology and now we're also beginning to play God and get into cloning and all kinds of things. So we don't like to have relationships we like to have them but we don't like to keep them and we don't know how to keep them. We give up quickly. Divorce is an easy option. So why not just create your own mate? And synthesize a human being. You get tired of it, you turn it off and put it in the closet, you know, like the vacuum cleaner. (laughs) You pull it out when you want it. Oh you don't want this one, and then you want, you start, it's probably going to happen one day. We're going to get to a really sick point of designing fake people."

The song features notable sound effects that can be associated with everyday machines, such as the vacuum cleaner and drill.

== Track listing ==
- UK CD single edition
1. "Black Velveteen" (Album Version) – 4:49
2. "American Woman" (Timbaland Remix) – 3:49
3. "Black Velveteen" (S-Man's Ghost in the Machine Mix) – 7:11

Note: This release also contains the uncensored version of the music video for the song.

- UE CD single edition
1. "Black Velveteen" (Edit) – 3:31
2. "Live" (Live Version) – 6:19
3. "Supersoulfighter" – 7:08
4. "Fly Away" (Reggae Version) – 5:06
- 12" edition
1. "Black Velveteen" (S-Man's Ghost in the Machine Mix) – 7:10
2. "Black Velveteen" (S-Man's Ghost in the Machine Dub) – 5:58
3. "Black Velveteen" (S-Man's Ghost in the Machine Instrumental) – 5:55
4. "Black Velveteen" (Stonebridge EXFM Mix) – 4:57
5. "Black Velveteen" (Stonebridge Club Dub) – 6:21
6. "Black Velveteen" (RPO Ready To Please Mix) – 6:16
7. "Black Velveteen" (RPO Titanium Spin Dub Mix) – 5:41
