= Again (Lenny Kravitz song) =

2000 song by Lenny Kravitz

- Standard non-US artwork

Single by Lenny Kravitz

from the album Greatest Hits
- Released: September 22, 2000
- Genre: Rock; neo soul
- Length: 3:50
- Label: Virgin
- Songwriter: Lenny Kravitz
- Producer: Lenny Kravitz

Lenny Kravitz singles chronology
"Black Velveteen" (1999)	"Again" (2000)	"Dig In" (2001)

Music video
- "Again" on YouTube

"Again" is a song by American rock musician Lenny Kravitz, being the only new song from his first Greatest Hits album, released in 2000. Written, arranged and produced by himself, "Again" was initially set to be on his sixth studio album Lenny; however, Kravitz found that the song did not fit the tone of the album, releasing it instead as the lead single from the compilation on September 22, 2000, through Virgin Records. The mid-tempo rock ballad finds Kravitz wondering if he will ever see his former lover again and if they will reunite once more.

"Again" received generally favorable reviews from music critics, who called it a "magnificent" and "anthemic pounder". "Again" also won Kravitz a Grammy Award for Best Male Rock Vocal Performance at the 43rd Annual Grammy Awards in 2001, a feat he had already achieved twice consecutively, with "Fly Away" and "American Woman". Commercially, the single reached number four on the US Billboard Hot 100, becoming Kravitz's first top-five hit in nearly nine years. "Again" was also successful internationally, topping the charts of Iceland and Italy, reaching number five in New Zealand, and becoming a top-10 hit in Austria, Croatia, Portugal, Spain, and Switzerland. The song's music video was directed by Paul Hunter and stars Lenny and actress Gina Gershon as two-thirds of a romantic triangle.

== Background and release ==
In 1998, Lenny Kravitz released his fifth studio album, 5. The album received mixed reviews from critics, who praised the revitalization of his sound, but believed the album was not as enjoyable as his previous offerings. Despite the negative reviews, the album sold six million copies worldwide and spawned one of Kravitz's most successful singles, "Fly Away", which peaked inside the top 10 in many countries and topped the UK Singles Chart, While releasing 5's final single, "Black Velveteen", Kravitz announced the release of his first greatest hits album. Driven by the approach of the holiday shopping season, Virgin Records released the compilation featuring one new song, "Again," and 14 old tracks. "Again" was one of the several tracks Kravitz wrote for his then-upcoming album Lenny, but he decided to release it separately and include it on Greatest Hits, deciding it did not fit in with the album's tone. There was an aggressive media campaign for the release of the song utilizing the Internet. It was released on September 22, 2000, and was the most added song on the "rock format" during its first week on radio.

== Composition and lyrics ==
"Again" was written, arranged and produced solely by Lenny Kravitz. According to the digital sheet music published by Sony/ATV Music Publishing, the song is written in the key of A major, and set in a moderate tempo. Kravitz's vocals span from the low note of E3 to the high note of A4. Lyrically, "Again" details about losing contact with a past lover and wondering if they will ever encounter each other in the future to give the relationship another chance.

== Critical reception and accolades ==
"Again" received high praise from music critics. In his review of Greatest Hits, Stephen Thomas Erlewine of AllMusic selected the song as one of the album's highlights as well as calling the song "magnificent". Matthew S. Robinson of Music Dish wrote that the song is "an anthemic pounder which, like so many of his other songs, is hook-heavy and a bit repetitive and for which Kravitz diligently handles much of the orchestration and performance himself." Rob Brunner of Entertainment Weekly was more critical with the song, calling it a "ridiculous mid-tempo snooze", where Kravitz "sings like Bryan Adams and plays guitar like he's auditioning for a Journey tribute band."

"Again" was nominated and eventually won a Grammy Award for Best Male Rock Vocal Performance, in its 43rd Annual Grammy Awards. By doing so, Kravitz managed to set a Grammy Award record, by having the most consecutive Grammys won for Best Male Rock Vocal Performance with "Fly Away" (1999), "American Woman" (2000), "Again" (2001) and later "Dig In" (2002). The song also entered VH1's list of "25 Greatest Power Ballads" at number 13.

== Commercial performance ==
"Again" debuted on the Billboard Hot 100 chart at number 72, becoming the "Hot Shot Debut" of the week ending November 18, 2000. The song entered the top-ten nine weeks later, on the edition of January 20, 2001, climbing from number 11 to number 9, becoming his second top-ten single. On the issue of February 10, 2001, "Again" climbed to number 5, with a gain of 5 million listeners, becoming the most-played song in the country. The song went on to peak higher a week later, climbing to number 4, becoming its peak position for four consecutive weeks. It became Kravitz's most successful song in nearly nine years, the last being 1991's "It Ain't Over 'til It's Over", which peaked at number two. The song also topped the Adult Top 40 and Mainstream Top 40 charts simultaneously, a record at the time.

The song was also successful elsewhere. It debuted and peaked at the top of the Italian charts on November 23, 2000. It later re-entered the charts at number 3 and after falling to number 5, the song climbed to number 2, spending a total of ten weeks on the charts. In New Zealand, the song climbed slowly the charts until peaking at number 5, in its fourteenth week, on February 25, 2001; his highest-charting single since "Believe" (1993). The song also peaked inside the top-ten in Switzerland, becoming one of his most successful songs there, while in Austria, it remains as Kravitz's most successful song, reaching a peak of number six.

== Music video ==
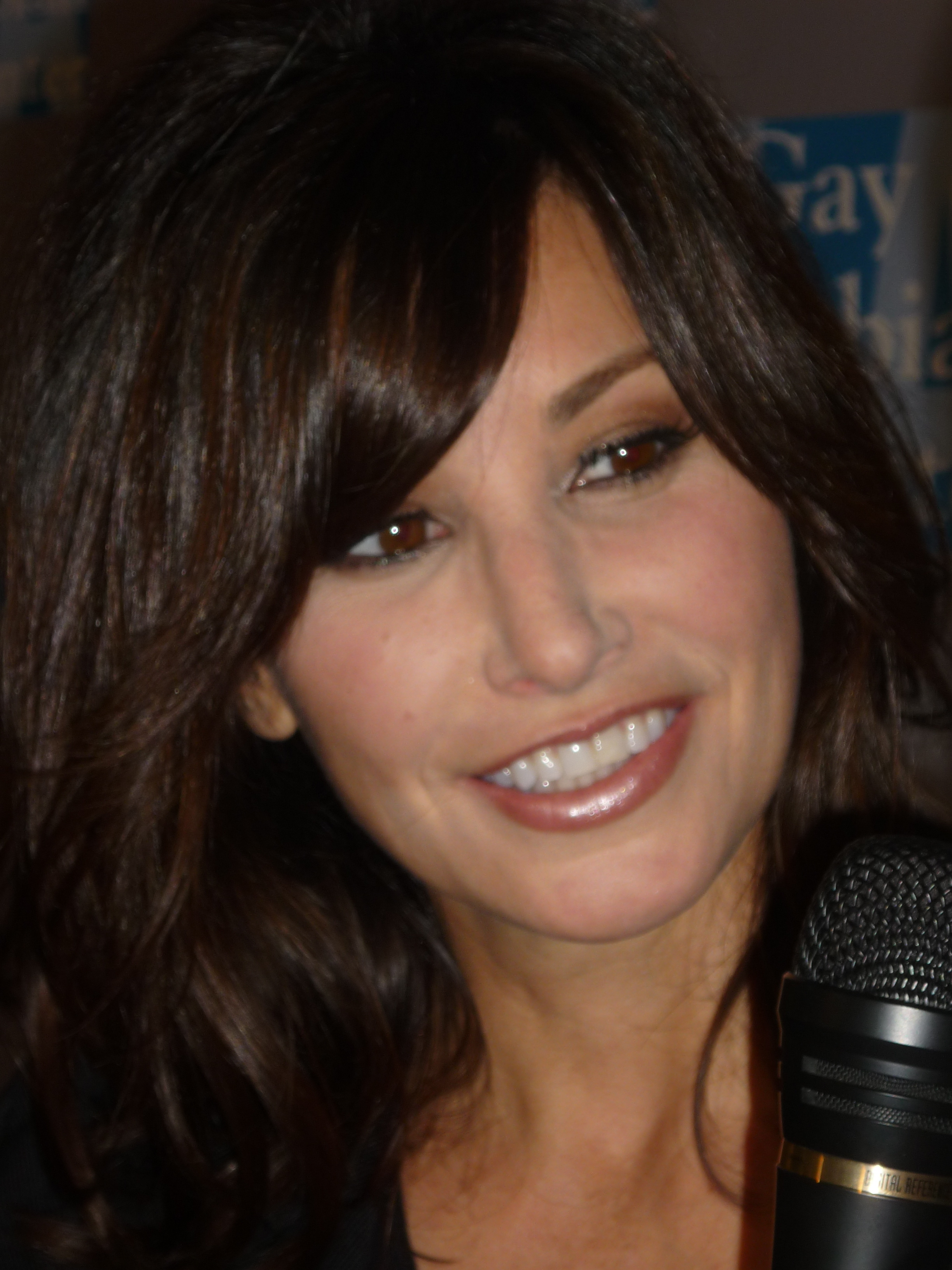
Gina Gershon plays Kravitz's girlfriend in the video.

The music video for the song was directed by acclaimed video director Paul Hunter and was filmed in New York City's TriBeCa neighborhood. It stars Lenny and actress Gina Gershon as two-thirds of a sordid romantic triangle. The video became the first ever downloadable video on MTV.com and VH1.com.

=== Synopsis ===
The music video for "Again" features Kravitz with his girlfriend in his apartment (Gershon), whom he does not seem to be interested in. Similar to the song's lyrical content, he meets a girl (Teresa Lourenco), who works as a waitress in the Nolita restaurant Café Habana. At the end of the video, Kravitz goes to the restaurant to meet her again, but she is not there and Kravitz leaves. Soon after he leaves, the waitress enters the restaurant, not knowing he was there to see her. Kravitz returns to his apartment, losing the chance to meet her one more time. Some other shots of the video show Kravitz performing the song at the Limelight club. Other scenes show Kravitz in his apartment, wandering around, shown nude after taking a shower, watching television and some sexually suggestive scenes where he is seen making out with Teresa.

== Track listings ==
Australian CD1 and Japanese CD single

1. "Again"
2. "Fly Away" (live)
3. "Always on the Run" (live)
4. "Are You Gonna Go My Way" (live)
5. "Again" (video)

Australian CD2

1. "Again" – 3:52
2. "Fly Away" (live) – 5:45
3. "Always on the Run" (live) – 12:06
4. "Are You Gonna Go My Way" (live) – 5:41
5. "Again" (Stankonia remix feat. Outkast—clean version) – 4:09
6. "Again" (Stankonia remix feat. Outkast) – 4:09
7. "Again" (video)

UK CD single

1. "Again"
2. "Fly Away" (live)
3. "Always on the Run" (live)
4. "Again" (video)

European CD single

1. "Again" – 3:51
2. "Let Love Rule" (live) – 6:54

European CD single with free poster

1. "Again"
2. "Are You Gonna Go My Way" (live)
3. "Let Love Rule" (live)

== Charts ==
=== Weekly charts ===
Chart (2000–2001)	Peak position
Australia (ARIA)	30
Austria (Ö3 Austria Top 40)	6
Belgium (Ultratop 50 Flanders)	39
Belgium (Ultratip Bubbling Under Wallonia)	3
Canada Airplay	1
Canada Rock/Alternative (RPM)	6
Croatia (HRT)	5
Europe (Eurochart Hot 100)	25
Finland (Suomen virallinen lista)	16
France (SNEP)	57
Germany (GfK)	19
Iceland (Íslenski Listinn Topp 40)	1
Italy (FIMI)	1
Netherlands (Dutch Top 40)	25
Netherlands (Single Top 100)	25
New Zealand (Recorded Music NZ)	5
Poland Airplay (Music & Media)	4
Portugal (AFP)	2
Spain (Promusicae)	10
Sweden (Sverigetopplistan)	39
Switzerland (Schweizer Hitparade)	9
US Billboard Hot 100	4
US Adult Alternative Airplay (Billboard)	3
US Adult Pop Airplay (Billboard)	2
US Alternative Airplay (Billboard)	23
US Pop Airplay (Billboard)	1
US Rhythmic Airplay (Billboard)	34

=== Year-end charts ===
Chart (2000)	Position
Iceland (Íslenski Listinn Topp 40)	78
Switzerland (Schweizer Hitparade)	78
US Adult Top 40 (Billboard)	91

Chart (2001)	Position
Australia (ARIA)	88
Canada Radio (Nielsen BDS)	7
New Zealand (RIANZ)	31
US Billboard Hot 100	9
US Adult Top 40 (Billboard)	5
US Mainstream Top 40 (Billboard)	2
US Modern Rock Tracks (Billboard)	65
US Triple-A (Billboard)	17

== Certifications ==
Region	Certification	Certified units/sales
Australia (ARIA)	Gold	35,000^{^}
Brazil (Pro-Música Brasil)	Platinum	60,000^{*}
^{*} Sales figures based on certification alone.^{^} Shipments figures based on certification alone.

== Release history ==
Region	Date	Format(s)	Label(s)	Ref.
United States	September 22, 2000	Top 40; rock; triple-A radio	Virgin	
Japan	November 29, 2000	CD	Virgin	
Australia	February 21, 2001	CD1	Virgin	
Australia	May 21, 2001	CD2	Virgin	
