= Can't Get You Off My Mind =

1996 single by Lenny Kravitz

Single by Lenny Kravitz

from the album Circus
- Released: February 19, 1996
- Genre: Country rock
- Length: 4:34; 4:13 (edit)
- Label: Virgin
- Songwriter: Lenny Kravitz
- Producer: Lenny Kravitz

Lenny Kravitz singles chronology
"Circus" (1995)	"Can't Get You Off My Mind" (1996)	"The Resurrection" (1996)

Music video
- "Can't Get You Off My Mind" on YouTube

"Can't Get You Off My Mind" is a song written and performed by American musician Lenny Kravitz. It was released in February 1996 by Virgin Records, as the third single from his fourth studio album, Circus (1995). It peaked at numbers 62 and 63 on the US Billboard Hot 100 and Cash Box Top 100 charts. There were produced two versions of the music video for the song: one was directed by Matthew Rolston, the other by Jim Gable. "Can't Get You Off My Mind" was later included in the albums Greatest Hits (2000) and Lenny (2001) as a bonus track.

== Background ==
The song was inspired by Kravitz's missing his then-girlfriend while being on tour. Also, he missed his mother who died in December 1995. He explained to The Guardian that he envisioned the song while he stayed at the Royalton Hotel in New York. The song was initially called "The Country Song." Kravitz also said to Q, "...lyric was not a pastiche, man. It came out of me naturally, just as all my lyrics do. I don't analyze songwriting, I simply write... And anyway, when you are on tour a lot, as I was, life is a lonely highway, and I did get lonely out there on the open road, OK?".

== Reception ==
Daina Darzin from Cash Box noted that Kravitz "is positively countrified on this languid, pretty ballad, which turns gracefully soulful in midstream. Mellifluous vocals, gently twinning harmonies and easy-going, soaring instruments make this a track that could work on any number of radio formats." CD Review stated, "Kravitz is inspired by a lot more than just Jimi Hendrix and Sly Stone, and the second half of Circus slows down to accommodate a little mood and melody . But the lovey 'Can't Get You Off My Mind' has a little too calculated country feel".

Paul Moody from NME felt it "is so lovestruck dumb you can't help but fall for it". Rob Wagner of The Tech added, "Obviously, Kravitz's touring with the Rolling Stones has greatly influenced him. His song 'Can't Get You Off My Mind' steals some chords from 'Wild Horses' by the Stones. I kept expecting to hear Mick Jagger jump in." Kevin Powell of Vibe wrote, "With its country western texture, the song feels distant, as if Kravitz were somewhere deep in the sticks, chilling, dreaming about a woman he'd met at a local bar."

== Charts ==
Chart (1996)	Peak position
Canada Top Singles (RPM)	33
Canada Rock/Alternative (RPM)	20
UK Singles (Official Charts)	54
US Billboard Hot 100	62
US Adult Contemporary (Billboard)	36
US Cash Box Top 100	63

== Release history ==
Region	Date	Format(s)	Label(s)	Ref.
United States	January 30, 1996	Contemporary hit radio	Virgin	
United Kingdom	February 19, 1996	CD; cassette	Virgin	
United Kingdom	February 26, 1996	10-inch vinyl	Virgin	
Japan	March 20, 1996	CD	Virgin	
