= Stillness of Heart =

2002 single by Lenny Kravitz

Single by Lenny Kravitz

from the album Lenny
- B-side: "Flowers for Zöe" (acoustic)
- Released: January 14, 2002
- Length: 4:14
- Label: Virgin
- Songwriters: Lenny Kravitz; Craig Ross
- Producer: Lenny Kravitz

Lenny Kravitz singles chronology
"Dig In" (2001)	"Stillness of Heart" (2002)	"Believe in Me" (2002)

"Stillness of Heart" is a song written by Lenny Kravitz and Craig Ross. The song was included on Kravitz's 2001 album, Lenny, and was released as a single on January 14, 2002. "Stillness of Heart" charted at number 38 on the US Billboard Modern Rock Tracks charts, number 22 on the Canadian Singles Chart, and number 16 on the Italian Singles Chart.

== Track listings ==
Canadian CD single

1. "Stillness of Heart" (edit) – 3:48
2. "Flowers for Zöe" (acoustic version) – 2:46

UK CD single

1. "Stillness of Heart" (edit) – 3:48
2. "Stillness of Heart" (acoustic version) – 4:20
3. "Flowers for Zöe" (acoustic version) – 2:46

European CD single

1. "Stillness of Heart" – 4:15
2. "Flowers for Zöe" (acoustic version) – 2:46

European DVD single

1. "Stillness of Heart" (video) – 3:48
2. "Stillness of Heart" (rock remix audio) – 3:58
3. "God Is Love" (acoustic version) – 4:26
4. Bonus DVD footage

Australian CD single

1. "Stillness of Heart" – 4:15
2. "Stillness of Heart" (acoustic version) – 4:20
3. "Flowers for Zöe" (acoustic version) – 2:46
4. "Dig In" (video) – 4:07

== Charts ==
=== Weekly charts ===
Weekly chart performance for "Stillness of Heart"
Chart (2002)	Peak position
Austria (Ö3 Austria Top 40)	51
Belgium (Ultratip Bubbling Under Wallonia)	16
Canada (Nielsen SoundScan)	22
France (SNEP)	83
Germany (GfK)	38
Italy (FIMI)	16
Netherlands (Single Top 100)	84
Romania (Romanian Top 100)	60
Scotland Singles (OCC)	48
Switzerland (Schweizer Hitparade)	31
UK Singles (OCC)	44
US Bubbling Under Hot 100 (Billboard)	18
US Adult Alternative Airplay (Billboard)	7
US Adult Pop Airplay (Billboard)	18
US Alternative Airplay (Billboard)	38
US Dance Club Songs (Billboard) Remixes	13

=== Year-end charts ===
Year-end chart performance for "Stillness of Heart"
Chart (2002)	Position
Canada (Nielsen SoundScan)	126
Canada Radio (Nielsen BDS)	41
US Adult Top 40 (Billboard)	60
US Triple-A (Billboard)	29

== Release history ==
Release dates and formats for "Stillness of Heart"
Region	Date	Format(s)	Label(s)	Ref.
Europe	January 14, 2002	Maxi-CD	Virgin	
United States	January 28, 2002	Mainstream rock; active rock; alternative radio	Virgin	
United States	February 4, 2002	Triple A radio	Virgin	
United States	March 1, 2002	Contemporary hit; adult contemporary; hot AC radio	Virgin	
United Kingdom	March 25, 2002	CD	Virgin	
Japan	March 29, 2002	CD	Virgin	
Australia	June 17, 2002	CD	Virgin	
