= Lenny Kravitz =

American rock musician (born 1964)

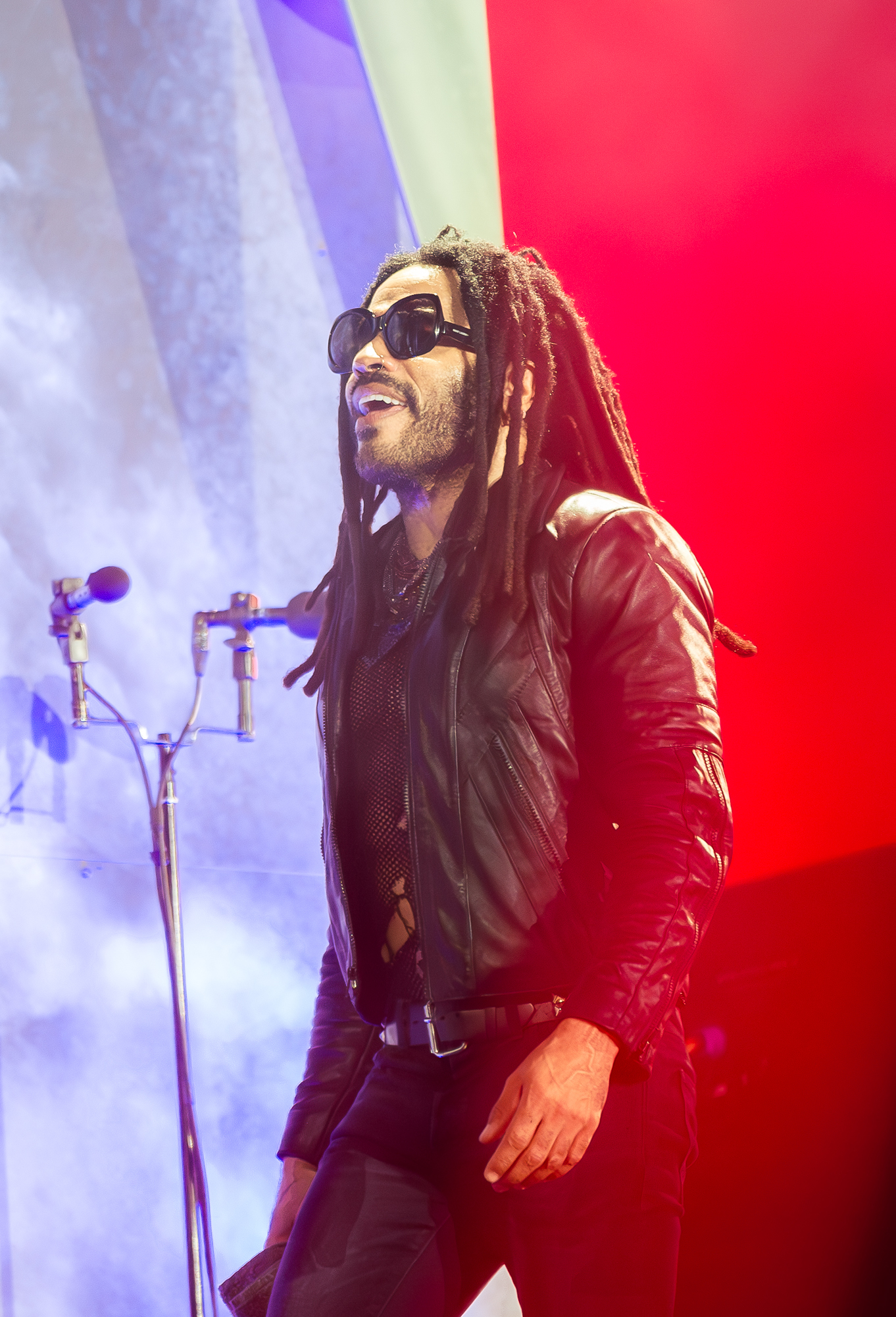
- Kravitz performing in 2024
- Born: Leonard Albert Kravitz; May 26, 1964 (age 62); New York City, U.S.
- Other name: Romeo Blue
- Occupations: Singer; songwriter; multi-instrumentalist; record producer; actor
- Years active: 1984–present
- Works: Discography; filmography
- Spouse: Lisa Bonet (m. 1987; div. 1993)
- Children: Zoë Kravitz
- Mother: Roxie Roker
- Relatives: Leonard M. Kravitz (uncle); Al Roker (second cousin)
- Awards: Full list
- Musical career
- Genres: Rock; funk; soul
- Instruments: Vocals; guitar; bass; drums; keyboards
- Labels: Virgin; EMI; Roadrunner; Kobalt; Loud & Proud; BMG
- Website: lennykravitz.com

Leonard Albert Kravitz (born May 26, 1964) is an American singer, musician, songwriter, record producer, and actor. His debut album Let Love Rule (1989) was characterized by a blend of rock, funk, reggae, hard rock, soul, and R&B, along with his subsequent releases.

Kravitz has had hit singles, including "It Ain't Over 'til It's Over" (1991) and "Again" (2000), both of which peaked within the Billboard Hot 100's top ten. His other hits include "Let Love Rule" (1989), "Always on the Run" (1991), "Are You Gonna Go My Way" (1993), "Fly Away" (1998), and "American Woman" (1999), all of which peaked within the top ten of the Alternative Airplay chart. Kravitz has won several awards, including the Grammy Award for Best Male Rock Vocal Performance, which he received four years in a row from 1999 to 2002, breaking the record for most wins in that category, and setting the record for most consecutive wins in one category by a male performer. Kravitz has sold over 40 million albums worldwide and was ranked 93 on VH1's "100 Greatest Artists of Hard Rock".

Aside from his music career, Kravitz has acted in films including Precious (2009) and the first two installments of The Hunger Games film series (2012–13). In addition, he also founded the creative studio Kravitz Design Inc. Kravitz was previously married to Lisa Bonet, with whom he has a daughter, Zoë Kravitz.

== Early life ==
Kravitz was born on May 26, 1964, in New York City, the only child of NBC television news producer Sy Kravitz (1924–2005) and actress Roxie Roker (1929–1995). His mother came from a Christian family that was of African American and Bahamian descent. His grandfather was Russian-Jewish. Kravitz's paternal grandparents emigrated to the United States from Kyiv. Through his mother, Kravitz is a second cousin of television weather presenter Al Roker, as their grandfathers were brothers. Kravitz was named after his uncle, Leonard M. Kravitz, a private first class who was killed in action in the Korean War at the age of 20, while single-handedly holding off a Chinese attack, enabling most of his platoon to escape. (Note: Leonard M. Kravitz was posthumously awarded the Distinguished Service Cross but was denied the Medal of Honor. In 2014, he received the Medal of Honor in a ceremony that awarded it to 24 servicemen who had been passed over because of their ethnicity or religion.)

During his early years, Kravitz did not grow up in a religious environment. After a spiritual experience when he was 13, he started attending church and later became a non-denominational Christian. Kravitz grew up spending weekdays on the Upper East Side of Manhattan with his parents, attending P.S. 6 for elementary school, and spending weekends at his grandmother Bessie's house in the Bedford-Stuyvesant neighborhood of Brooklyn.

Kravitz began banging on pots and pans in the kitchen, playing them as drums at the age of three. He decided that he wanted to be a musician at the age of five. He began playing the drums and soon added guitar. He grew up listening to the music his parents listened to: R&B, jazz, classical, opera, gospel, and blues. He said, "My parents were very supportive of the fact that I loved music early on, and they took me to a lot of shows." Around the age of seven, he saw the Jackson 5 perform at Madison Square Garden, and they became his favorite performers. His father, who was a jazz promoter, was friends with Duke Ellington, Sarah Vaughan, Count Basie, Ella Fitzgerald, Bobby Short, Miles Davis, and other jazz greats; Ellington played "Happy Birthday" for him on his fifth birthday.

In 1974, at the age of 10, Kravitz relocated to Los Angeles with his parents when his mother landed her role on The Jeffersons. At his mother's urging, he joined the California Boys Choir for three years, where he performed a classical repertoire, and sang with the Metropolitan Opera. He took part in Mahler's Third Symphony at the Hollywood Bowl. It was in Los Angeles that Kravitz was introduced to rock music, listening to the Beatles, the Rolling Stones, Led Zeppelin, Jimi Hendrix, the Grateful Dead, Aerosmith, Black Sabbath, Creedence Clearwater Revival, Kiss, Pink Floyd, and the Who, and he said he was "attracted to the cool style, the girls, the rock 'n' roll lifestyle." During his junior high school years, he was also introduced to marijuana; he has stated that he was a "pothead" during his youth. His other musical influences at the time included Fela Kuti, Bill Withers, Marvin Gaye, Pharoah Sanders, and Miles Davis. Later influences came in the form of John Lennon and Bob Marley. Kravitz attended Beverly Hills High School, where he was classmates with Maria McKee, Nicolas Cage, and Slash. He taught himself to play piano and bass and made friends with Zoro, who would later become his long-time collaborator. His parents divorced in 1985.

== Career ==
=== 1985–1990: Virgin Records and career debut ===
With record labels reportedly telling him his music was not "black enough" or "white enough", Kravitz decided to record an album on his own under the name Romeo Blue. Kravitz had met the recording engineer, keyboardist, and bassist Henry Hirsch in 1985 when recording a demo at his Hoboken, New Jersey, recording studio. The two shared an interest in using real instruments and vintage recording equipment, as well as a love of R&B, jazz, and rock. Kravitz would go on to collaborate with Hirsch on most of his albums. Kravitz began working on his debut album with Hirsch over the next year and a half, with Kravitz's father paying for the studio time. Kravitz met saxophonist Karl Denson and invited him to play on the song "Let Love Rule". Kravitz was so impressed with his playing that Denson played on much of the album. Beginning in the late 1980s, Denson toured with Kravitz for five years.

In October 1988, after completing most of the recording, Kravitz approached friend Stephen Elvis Smith, who had served as the music supervisor on Lisa Bonet's The Cosby Show spin-off A Different World. Smith had also worked with Kravitz's mother on the hit sitcom The Jeffersons. Kravitz urged Smith to manage his career and assist him in finding a record deal. In less than a month of shopping the recordings, five labels (Warner Bros, Elektra, Geffen, Capitol, and Virgin) were in a bidding war for Kravitz. Eventually, a deal was made with Virgin Records in January 1989, and signed by Virgin A&R executive Nancy Jeffries. The label was "excited" about the music he was making, music inspired by his relationship with wife Bonet and their new daughter, Zoe. On Smith's urging, Kravitz dropped the name Romeo Blue and reclaimed the Lenny Kravitz moniker. About his time as Romeo Blue, Kravitz said, "Ultimately, it got me back to myself. And when I finally did accept myself for myself, music started flowing out of me."

Kravitz released his debut album Let Love Rule in 1989, a combination of rock and funk with a 1960s vibe. Music critics were mixed: some felt Kravitz was a gifted new artist, others felt he was overpowered by his musical influences. The album was a moderate success in the United States, but became an instant hit outside of the US, especially in Europe. Lisa Bonet directed the debut music video for the title track, "Let Love Rule". Stephen Smith signed Kravitz with talent booking agency CAA, who soon were fielding offers for Kravitz, first on a club tour, and then in opening slots for Tom Petty & the Heartbreakers, Bob Dylan, and David Bowie. Having played essentially all of the instruments on the album, Kravitz had to quickly assemble a touring band to support the Let Love Rule release.

=== 1991–2001: Popularity established ===
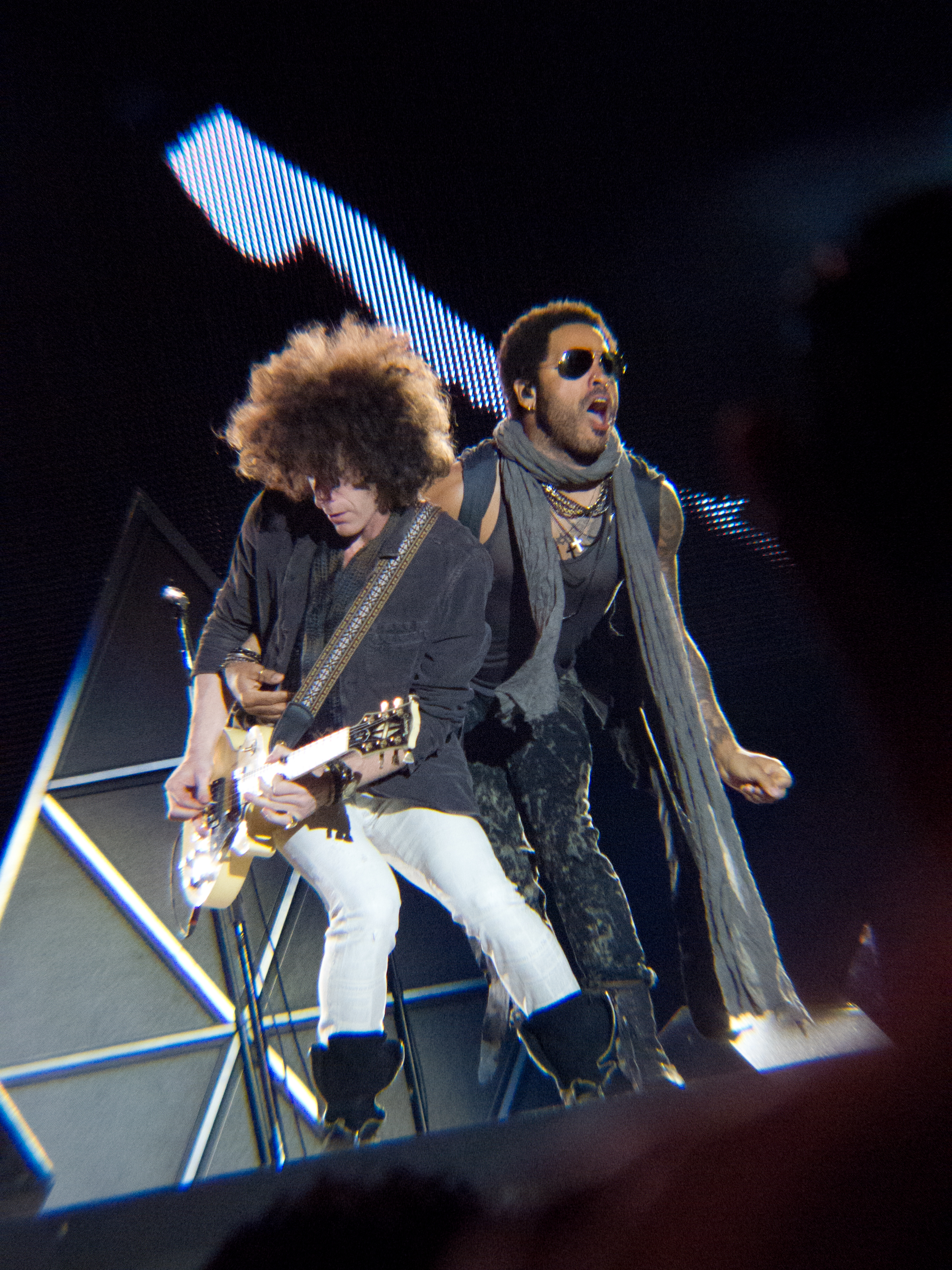
Kravitz and Craig Ross during a concert

In 1990, Kravitz produced the song "Justify My Love" for Madonna, which he co-wrote with Ingrid Chavez. The song appeared on her greatest hits album The Immaculate Collection.

Kravitz separated from Lisa Bonet in 1991, amid rumors of an affair between him and Madonna. Kravitz has denied any infidelity. Kravitz and Bonet divorced in 1993. Kravitz produced the self-titled album Vanessa Paradis (1991) for French singer and actress Vanessa Paradis. He played most of the instruments and co-wrote most of the songs on the album.

In 1991, Kravitz released his second album, Mama Said. The songs on the album were about Bonet and documented his depression over their breakup. The single, "It Ain't Over 'til It's Over", went to number 2 on the Billboard Hot 100. A second single "Always on the Run", a tribute to his mother, featured Slash on guitar. "Stand by My Woman" and "What Goes Around Comes Around" followed. Sean Lennon co-wrote and played piano on the song "All I Ever Wanted".

His third album, Are You Gonna Go My Way (1993), solidified his global popularity, with the title track topping both the Billboard Album Rock Tracks and Modern Rock Tracks charts. The song's music video also earned him the MTV Video Music Award for Best Male Video for 1993.

In 1994, Kravitz recorded "Main Squeeze" with Teena Marie from her Passion Play album. Kravitz also made a video to pay tribute to Marie when she suddenly died on December 26, 2010. He recorded a funk-rock version of the song "Deuce" for the Kiss cover album Kiss My Ass: Classic Kiss Regrooved. The track featured Stevie Wonder on harmonica and background vocals.

With 5 (1998), Kravitz won the first of his four consecutive Grammy for Best Male Rock Vocal Performance at the Grammy Awards of 1999. In 1999 he produced and sang with Cree Summer on her solo album Street Faërie.

His cover version of the Guess Who's hit "American Woman" won him another Grammy at the Grammy Awards of 2000 and helped the Guess Who's song reach a new audience. Kravitz's version of the song originally came from the soundtrack of Austin Powers: The Spy Who Shagged Me and was added to 5 as a bonus track in 1999. Kravitz worked on two songs for Michael Jackson's Invincible album released in 2001; a snippet of "Another Day" was leaked, and the full version was officially released on the album Michael in 2010.

Kravitz released a Greatest Hits album in 2000. The single "Again" earned him his third consecutive Grammy for the Best Male Rock Vocal at the Grammy Awards of 2001.

=== 2006–2009: Live Earth, charity work, and It Is Time for a Love Revolution ===
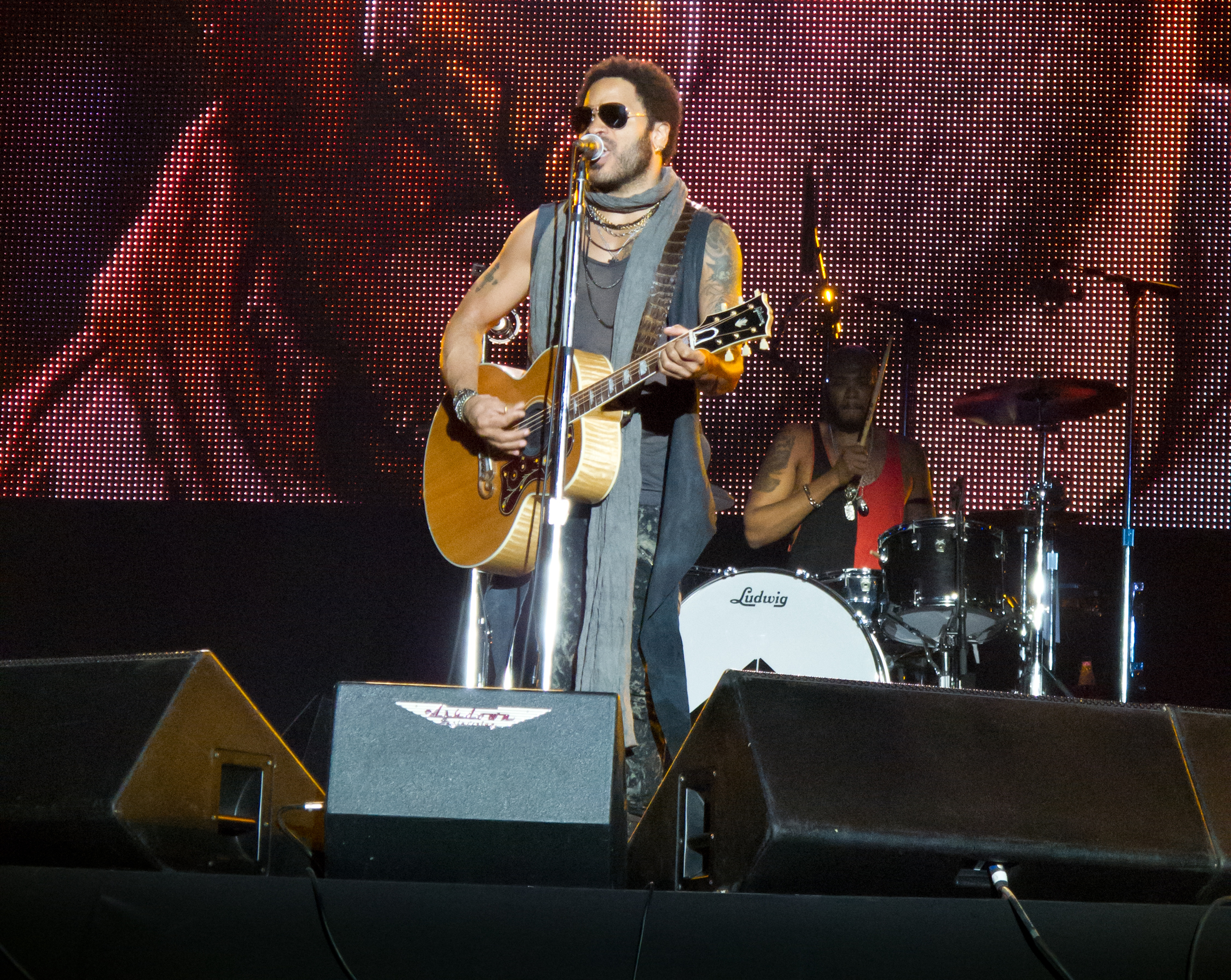
Kravitz performing in 2012

In January 2006, Kravitz contributed "Breathe" to absoluttracks, a project sponsored by Absolut Vodka. This song was re-mixed by ten musical producers and distributed via the internet. Kravitz appeared in the audience of Madonna's Confessions Tour (2006) during numerous shows. He later joined Madonna live on stage to play guitar on the song, "I Love New York", at the last of four Paris shows. Kravitz founded a design firm named Kravitz Design, stating if he hadn't been a musician he would have been a designer. Kravitz Design, focused on interior and furniture design, has designed residential spaces, as well as a chandelier for the crystal company Swarovski, named "Casino Royale".

On July 7, 2007, Kravitz performed at the Brazilian leg of Live Earth in Rio de Janeiro, making him one of three major international rock stars to perform two huge free concerts at the world-famous Copacabana Beach along with Macy Gray and the Rolling Stones. Kravitz had already played there on March 21, 2005, drawing 300,000 people on a concert of his own. The Live Earth concert, with eight other acts on the bill, including Pharrell and Macy Gray had an audience of 400,000 on the beach. Also in 2007, Kravitz released a version of "Cold Turkey" by John Lennon on the charity CD Instant Karma: The Amnesty International Campaign to Save Darfur. Kravitz also spent time recording his latest album, It Is Time for a Love Revolution, released February 5, 2008. On September 25, 2007, the Fats Domino tribute album Goin' Home; A Tribute To Fats Domino was released. Kravitz was on the song "Whole Lotta Lovin'" along with Rebirth Brass Band, Troy "Trombone Shorty" Andrews, Fred Wesley, Pee Wee Ellis, and Maceo Parker.

Kravitz made his feature film acting debut in Precious which premiered at the Sundance Film Festival in January 2009.

=== 2009–2011: U2 tour and Black and White America ===
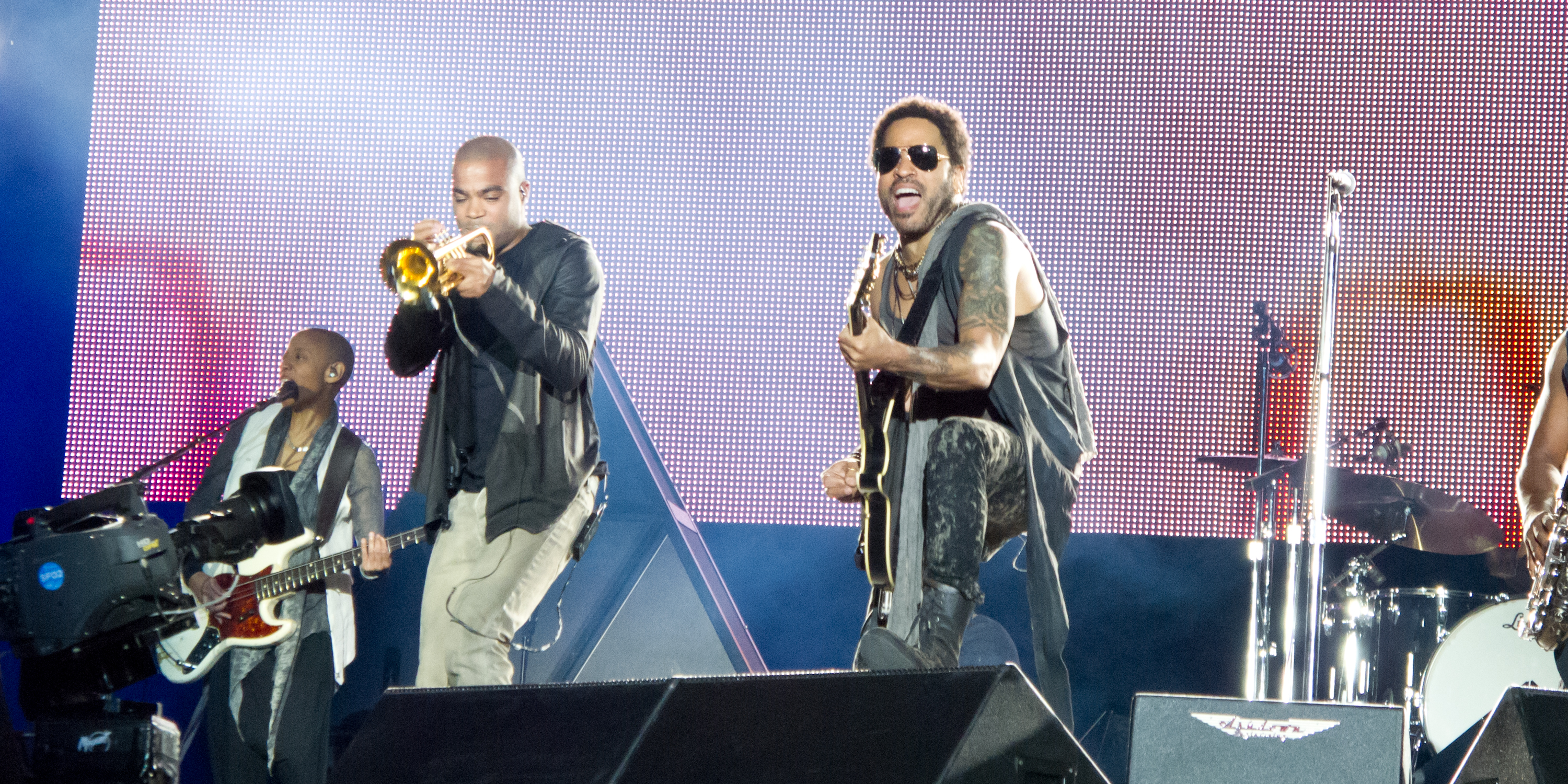
Kravitz performing in 2012

In June 2010 it was announced that Kravitz would guest star on an episode of the upcoming season of Entourage.

In 2011 Kravitz was honored with one of the highest cultural awards in France when he was made an Officer of the Ordre des Arts et des Lettres by French cultural minister Frederic Mitterrand in Paris. Kravitz stated he was "particularly touched" to receive the award in France as his success in the country pre-dated his success in the United States and still enjoys great record sales in the country today. Kravitz joined other American recipients such as Martin Scorsese, George Clooney, and Bob Dylan. On February 26, 2012, he performed at the Daytona International Speedway for the Daytona 500, the opening race of the 2012 NASCAR Sprint Cup season. A sample of "Are You Gonna Go My Way" was used in American singer Chris Willis's single "Too Much In Love", released on August 16, 2011.

=== 2012–present: The Hunger Games films, Super Bowl performance, and further albums ===
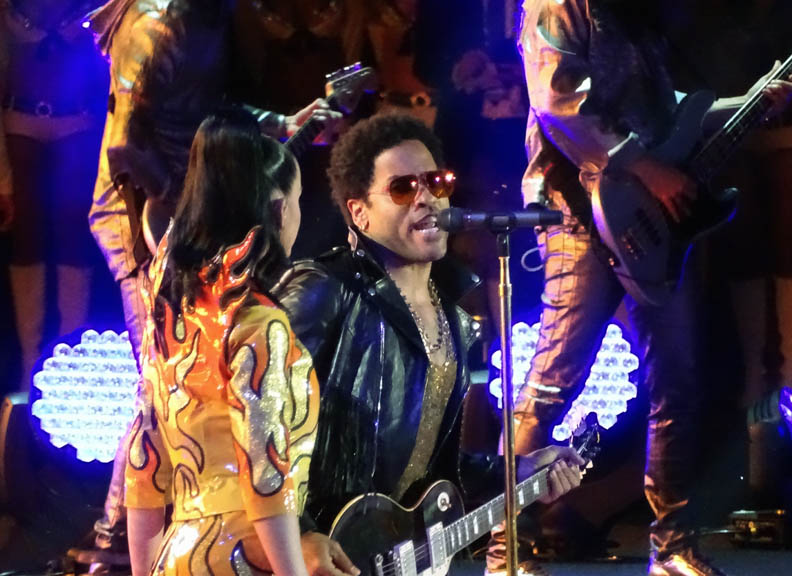
Kravitz performing with Katy Perry at the Super Bowl XLIX halftime show

Lenny Kravitz played the part of Katniss's creative stylist, Cinna, in the first two Hunger Games films, The Hunger Games released on March 23, 2012, and The Hunger Games: Catching Fire released on November 22, 2013.

In 2014 Lenny Kravitz released his tenth studio album Strut on his own Roxie Records via Kobalt Label Services. In 2015, Kravitz performed alongside Katy Perry at the Super Bowl XLIX halftime show.

During an August 2015 show in Stockholm, Kravitz experienced a wardrobe malfunction. His leather pants ripped open, exposing his penis.

As a designer, Kravitz launched a furniture collection in partnership with CB2 in 2015.

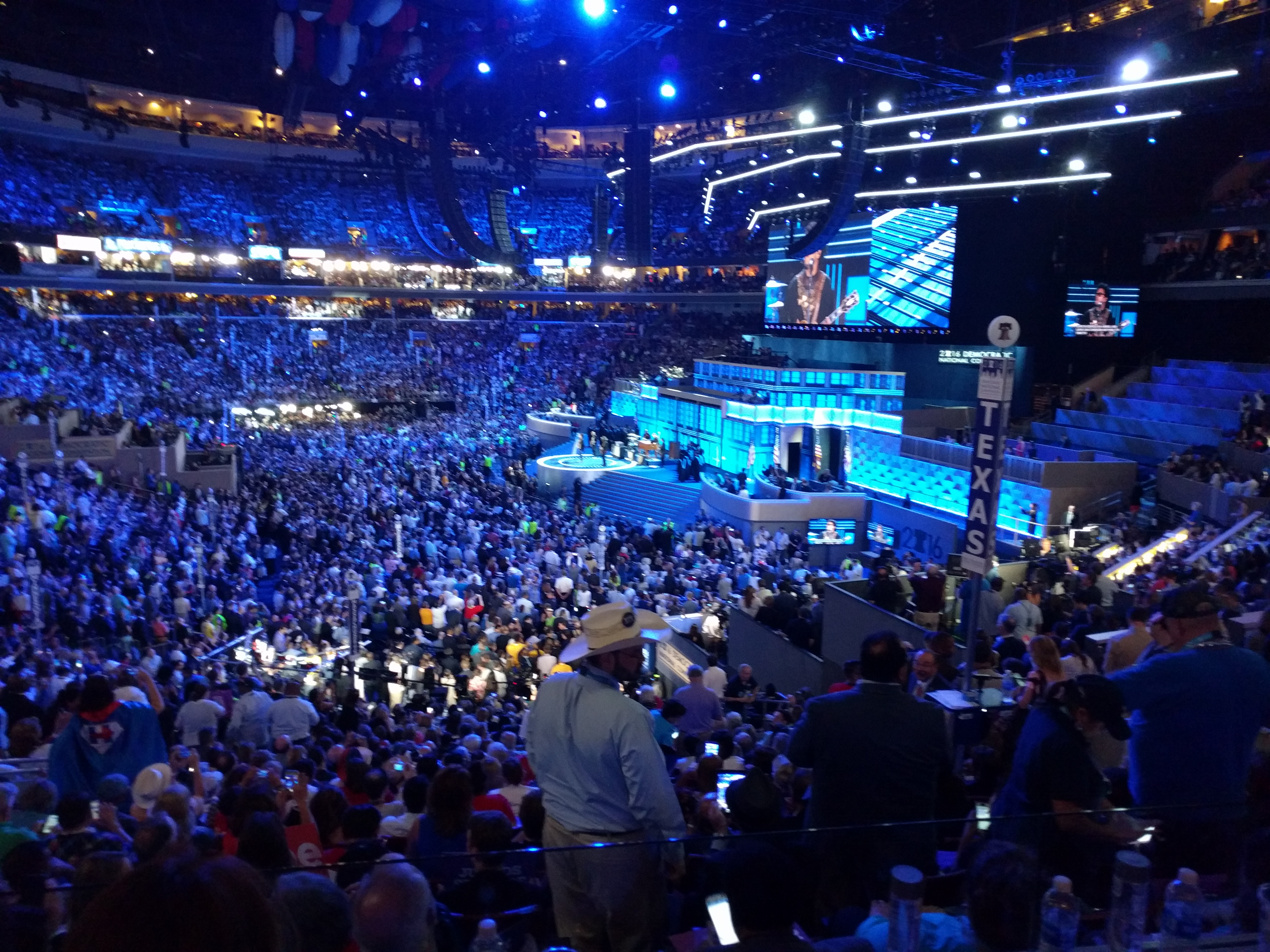
Kravitz performing at the 2016 Democratic National Convention

In 2015, he became a furniture designer for the first time ever, launching a collection of furniture products marketed under the label CB2 x Kravitz design through retailer CB2. The collection was apparently inspired by the 70s and by the work of Italian designer Gabriella Crespi.

The Raise Vibration world tour (2018) coincided with the release of his 11th studio album.

In April 2018, Kravitz signed with BMG Rights Management for a new worldwide publishing music deal to go with his new album Raise Vibration, released in September 2018. BMG had acquired Kravitz's music publishing rights in 2013, as part of Virgin Music Publishing.

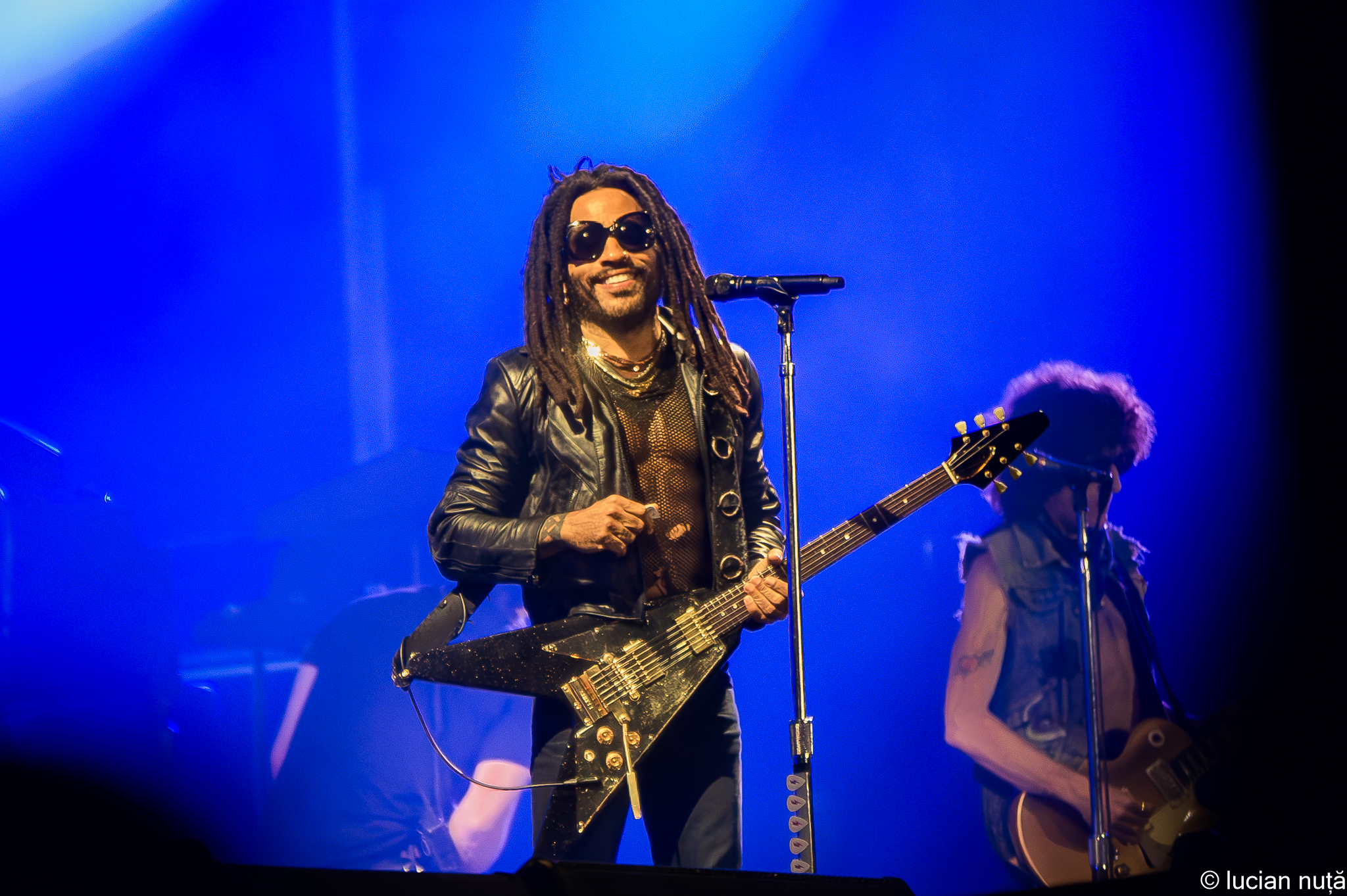
Kravitz performing at Untold Festival in 2024

In 2023, Kravitz wrote and performed a song for the film Rustin titled "Road to Freedom". The song was nominated for a Golden Globe Award for Best Original Song. In December 2023, the Academy of Motion Picture Arts and Sciences announced shortlists for the 96th Oscars ceremony, and "Road to Freedom" was included in the Best Original Song category. Kravitz won Music Icon of the Year at the 49th People's Choice Awards. In March 2024, he received a star on the Hollywood Walk of Fame.

On May 24, 2024, he released his 12th album, Blue Electric Light, which was supported by a world tour with the same name.

In 2026, Kravitz appeared in his first video game acting role playing the villain Bawma in 007 First Light, lending his voice and likeness to the role of a pirate king who faces off against secret agent James Bond.

== Other work ==
=== Photography and collaboration with Leica ===
Kravitz has partnered with Leica on two occasions: in 2015, a Leica M-P edition titled "The Correspondent", and again in 2019 with a Monochrom edition titled "Drifter". The 2019 collaboration also included a gallery of his own work, which was unveiled on May 24, 2019, and was on display at the Leica Gallery in Wetzlar Germany.

=== Kravitz Design ===
Kravitz Design is a New York City–based company founded by Kravitz in 2003. Kravitz Design focuses on commercial, residential and product creative direction and design.

Among its clients are the Morgans Hotel Group, Swarovski Crystal, and The Setai Group. Swarovski selected Kravitz Design in 2005 and 2006 to participate in their Crystal Palace Collection. Kravitz Design also envisioned a luxury recording studio for The Setai Resort and Residences in Miami Beach, New York, Paris, and New Orleans. In 2010, Kravitz Design collaborated with Flavor Paper wallpaper on the Tropicalismo Collection, a line inspired by Brazil's Tropicalia art movement of the late 1960s.

== Personal life ==
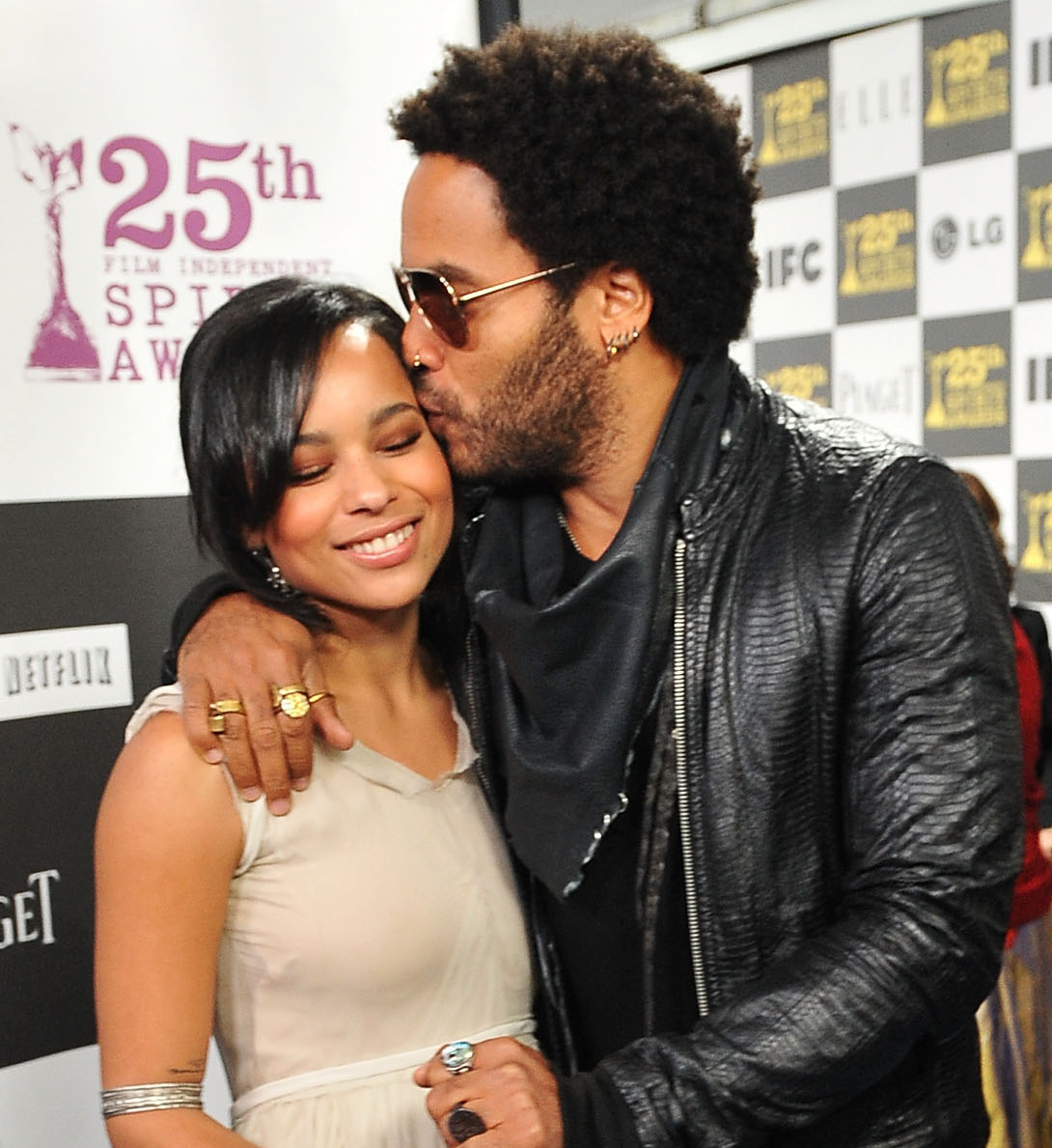
Kravitz with his daughter Zoë in March 2010

In 1985, Kravitz met actress Lisa Bonet backstage at a concert in California. They were close friends for two years before beginning a relationship. In 1987, Kravitz moved back to New York City, to move in with Bonet. They eloped in Las Vegas on November 16, 1987, her 20th birthday. Kravitz, still known as Romeo Blue at the time, found himself in the headlines of tabloids. He and Bonet had a daughter, Zoë Isabella Kravitz, on December 1, 1988, who became an actress, singer and model. Kravitz and Bonet separated in 1991. They divorced amicably in 1993.

Kravitz dated French singer and model Vanessa Paradis from 1991 to 1996. He began dating Brazilian model Adriana Lima in 2001, and they lived together before becoming engaged in 2002. The engagement was called off in August 2003. Lima was featured in the music video for Kravitz's 2002 single "Yesterday Is Gone (My Dear Kay)". He briefly dated and was engaged to Australian actress Nicole Kidman from 2003 to 2004.

Kravitz identifies himself as a Christian in a religious sense "through choice" but stated: "I'm also a Jew. It's all the same to me." During another interview, he stated: "I'm half Jewish, I'm half black, I look in-between." He notes that spirituality "has been an important issue in [his] growth", citing his upbringing by parents of different faiths. Such spirituality is prominently featured in many of his songs, such as the lyrics on his album Baptism, and a tattoo on his back that is inscribed with "My Heart Belongs to Jesus Christ". In 2011, he stated that his 2005 religious commitment to remain celibate until remarriage was unchanged. In a 2014 interview with Men's Health, however, he reconsidered his previous stance. In 2024, Kravitz reaffirmed his desire to remain celibate once again, stating that it was his father's infidelity that inspired him to make a change. "After the marriage [to ex-wife Lisa Bonet], I became more like him. I was becoming a player... I didn't like it. I didn't want to be that guy. So I had to tackle that and it took years... by taking responsibility. Discipline. Not letting my own desires take over." Kravitz stated in the same interview that he had not been in a romantic relationship for nine years at that point.

He owns a house in Paris, a farm compound in Brazil, and a trailer with the surrounding land in The Bahamas.

He follows veganism with a primarily raw vegan diet, and uses his land in Brazil and The Bahamas to grow his own food. PETA named Kravitz one of the Most Beautiful Vegan Celebrities of 2022.

== Legacy ==
A street has been named after Lenny Kravitz in Saint-Jean-d'Heurs, a rural commune of France.

== Discography ==
Studio albums

- Let Love Rule (1989)
- Mama Said (1991)
- Are You Gonna Go My Way (1993)
- Circus (1995)
- 5 (1998)
- Lenny (2001)
- Baptism (2004)
- It Is Time for a Love Revolution (2008)
- Black and White America (2011)
- Strut (2014)
- Raise Vibration (2018)
- Blue Electric Light (2024)

== Filmography ==
=== Film ===
Year	Title	Role	Notes
1998	The Rugrats Movie	Newborn Baby (voice)	Nominated—Kids Choice Award for Best Cameo Voice in Animated Film
2001	Zoolander	Himself	Cameo role
2007	The Diving Bell and the Butterfly	Himself	Cameo role
2009	La Traversée du Désir	Himself	Documentary
2009	Precious	Nurse John	Supporting role
2012	The Hunger Games	Cinna	Supporting role
2012	The World Is Watching: Making the Hunger Games	Himself	Documentary
2013	The Butler	James Holloway	Supporting role
2013	The Hunger Games: Catching Fire	Cinna	Supporting role
2014	Holy Ghost	Himself	Guest star
2022	Shotgun Wedding	Sean	Supporting role
2024	The Trainer	Himself	Supporting role
2025	Opus	Moretti Superfan No. 1	Cameo role (uncredited)

=== Television ===
Year	Title	Role	Notes
2001	Being Mick	Himself	Supporting role Television film
2002	The Simpsons	Himself	Episode: "How I Spent My Strummer Vacation"
2004	Rebelde	Himself	Guest star Episode: "Capítulo 127"
2010	Entourage	Himself	Guest star Episode: "Tequila and Coke"
2016	Better Things	Mel Trueblood	Guest star Episode: "Brown"
2016	Star	Roland Crane	2 episodes

=== Video games ===
Year	Title	Role	Notes
2026	007 First Light	Bawma	Voice role

== Tours ==
- Let Love Rule Tour (1990)
- There Is Only One Truth Tour (1991)
- Universal Love Tour (1993)
- Are You Gonna Go My Way Tour (1994) (opening for The Rolling Stones)
- Circus Tour (1995–96)
- The Freedom Tour (1998–99)
- Lenny Tour (2002)
- The Baptism Tour (2004)
- Celebration Tour (2005)
- Electric Church Tour: One Night Only (2005)
- Get on the Bus Mini-Tour (2008)
- Love Revolution Tour (2008)
- LLR 20(09) Tour (2009)
- Black and White Tour (2011)
- Strut Tour (2014–15)
- Raise Vibration Tour (2018–19)
- Here to Love Tour (2020)
- Blue Electric Light Tour (2024–25)
- Lenny Kravitz LIVE Tour (2026-Present)

== Awards and nominations ==
=== Grammy Awards ===
Year	Category	Recipient	Outcome
1994	Best Rock Song	"Are You Gonna Go My Way"	Nominated
1994	Best Male Rock Vocal Performance	"Are You Gonna Go My Way"	Nominated
1996	Best Male Rock Vocal Performance	"Rock and Roll Is Dead"	Nominated
1999	Best Male Rock Vocal Performance	"Fly Away"	Won
2000	Best Male Rock Vocal Performance	"American Woman"	Won
2001	Best Male Rock Vocal Performance	"Again"	Won
2001	Best Rock Song	"Again"	Nominated
2002	Best Male Rock Vocal Performance	"Dig In"	Won
2004	Best Male Rock Vocal Performance	"If I Could Fall In Love"	Nominated

=== Billboard Music Awards ===
Year	Nominee / work	Award	Result
1993	"Are You Gonna Go My Way"	Top Album Rock Track	Nominated
1993	Himself	Top Album Rock Tracks Artist	Nominated
1993	Himself	Top Modern Rock Tracks Artist	Nominated
1999	Himself	Top Modern Rock Tracks Artist	Nominated
1999	Himself	Top Hot 100 Artist - Male	Nominated
1999	"Fly Away"	Top Mainstream Rock Track	Nominated
2001	Himself	Top Male Artist	Nominated
2001	Himself	Top Billboard 200 Artist - Male	Nominated

=== Other awards and nominations ===
Year	Awards	Category	Recipient	Outcome
1990	MTV Video Music Awards	Best New Artist in a Video	"Let Love Rule"	Nominated
1991	Pollstar Concert Industry Awards	Club Tour of the Year	Let Love Rule Tour	Nominated
1991	Denmark GAFFA Awards	Best Foreign Solo Act	Himself	Nominated
1992	ASCAP Pop Music Awards	"It Ain't Over 'til It's Over"	Most Performed Songs	Won
1992	ASCAP Pop Music Awards	"Justify My Love"	Most Performed Songs	Won
1993	MTV Video Music Awards	Best Male Video	"Are You Gonna Go My Way"	Won
1993	MTV Video Music Awards	Best Art Direction	"Are You Gonna Go My Way"	Nominated
1993	Denmark GAFFA Awards	Best Foreign Album	Are You Gonna Go My Way	Nominated
1993	Denmark GAFFA Awards	Best Concert	Universal Love Tour	Nominated
1993	Denmark GAFFA Awards	Best Foreign Solo Act	Himself	Nominated
1994	Brit Awards	International Male Solo Artist	Himself	Won
1994	Pollstar Concert Industry Awards	Small Hall Tour of the Year	Universal Love Tour	Nominated
1994	Pollstar Concert Industry Awards	Most Creative Stage Production	Universal Love Tour	Nominated
1995	MTV Europe Music Awards	Best Male	Himself	Nominated
1998	VH1/Vogue Fashion Awards	Most Fashionable Artist, Male	Himself	Won
1998	Denmark GAFFA Awards	Best Foreign Songwriter	Himself	Nominated
1998	Fryderyk	Best Foreign Album	5	Nominated
1998	Kids Choice Awards	Best Cameo Voice in Animated Film	The Rugrats Movie	Nominated
1999	MTV Video Music Awards	Best Male Video	"Fly Away"	Nominated
1999	MTV Video Music Awards	Best Rock Video	"Fly Away"	Nominated
1999	MTV Europe Music Awards	Best Rock	Himself	Nominated
1999	Billboard Music Video Awards	FAN.tastic Video	"Fly Away"	Won
1999	Pollstar Concert Industry Awards	Small Hall Tour of the Year	The Freedom Tour	Nominated
1999	VH1 Fashion Awards	Most Fashionable Artist, Male	Himself	Nominated
1999	Online Music Awards	Favorite Male Artist	Himself	Nominated
2000	MVPA Awards	Best Pop Video	"American Woman"	Nominated
2000	MVPA Awards	Best Rock Video	"American Woman"	Nominated
2000	MVPA Awards	Soundtrack Video of the Year	"American Woman"	Nominated
2000	My VH1 Music Awards	Man of the Year	Himself	Nominated
2000	Teen Choice Awards	Choice Music: Male Artist	Himself	Nominated
2001	Teen Choice Awards	Choice Music: Male Artist	Himself	Nominated
2001	MTV Video Music Awards	Best Male Video	"Again"	Nominated
2001	MVPA Awards	Rock Video of the Year	"Again"	Nominated
2001	MVPA Awards	Best Styling in a Video	"Again"	Nominated
2001	Radio Music Awards	Artist of the Year/Pop Alternative Radio	Himself	Won
2001	Blockbuster Entertainment Awards	Favorite Male Artist – Rock	Himself	Won
2001	My VH1 Awards	Favorite Male Artist	Himself	Won
2002	American Music Awards	Favorite Pop/Rock Male Artist	Himself	Won
2002	Microsoft Windows Media Innovation Awards	Microsoft Windows Media Innovation Award	Himself	Won
2002	MTV Europe Music Awards	Best Live Act	Himself	Nominated
2002	MTV Europe Music Awards	Best Male	Himself	Nominated
2003	Lunas del Auditorio	Best Foreign Rock Artist	Himself	Nominated
2003	Teen Choice Awards	Choice Fashion Icon: Male	Himself	Nominated
2004	BDSCertified Spin Awards	50,000 Spins	"Lady"	Won
2005	Lunas del Auditorio	Best Foreign Rock Artist	Himself	Won
2006	ASCAP Pop Awards	Most Performed Song	"Lady"	Won
2008	MVPA Awards	Best Editing	"I'll Be Waiting"	Nominated
2008	MVPA Awards	Best Editing	"Love Love Love"	Nominated
2009	ECHO awards	Best International Male Artist	Himself	Nominated
2009	NRJ Music Awards	International Male Artist of the Year	Himself	Nominated
2009	Screen Actors Guild Awards	Best Performance by a Cast in a Motion Picture	Precious	Nominated
2009	Black Reel Awards	Best Ensemble	Precious	Won
2009	Black Reel Awards	Best Supporting Actor	Precious	Nominated
2009	Boston Society of Film Critics Awards	Best Cast	Precious	Won
2009	Critics' Choice Movie Awards	Best Acting Ensemble	Precious	Nominated
2009	NAACP Image Awards	Outstanding Supporting Actor in a Motion Picture	Precious	Nominated
2009	Washington D.C. Area Film Critics Association	Best Ensemble	Precious	Nominated
2010	D&AD Awards	Music Video	"Let Love Rule" (Justice Remix)	Wood Pencil
2012	DJ Awards	Best Ibiza Live Performance	Himself	Won
2012	MTV Movie Awards	Best Cast	The Hunger Games	Nominated
2013	NAACP Image Awards	Outstanding Supporting Actor in a Motion Picture	The Hunger Games	Nominated
2013	Critics' Choice Movie Awards	Best Acting Ensemble	The Butler	Nominated
2013	Screen Actors Guild Awards	Outstanding Performance by a Cast in a Motion Picture	The Butler	Nominated
2013	DJ Awards	Best Ibiza Live Performance	Himself	Won
2014	NRJ Music Awards	NRJ Award of Honor	Himself	Won
2015	UK Music Video Awards	Best Live Music Coverage	"Just Let Go"	Won
2018	UK Music Video Awards	Best Rock Video - International	"Low"	Nominated
2018	Lunas del Auditorio	Best Foreign Rock Artist	Himself	Nominated
2019	GAFFA-Prisen Awards	Best International Artist	Himself	Nominated
2019	MTV Video Music Awards	Best Rock Video	"Low"	Nominated
2024	MTV Video Music Awards	Best Rock Video	"Human"	Won
2024	Rock and Roll Hall of Fame	Performer	Himself	Nominated
2025	MTV Video Music Awards	Best Rock Video	"Honey"	Nominated
2026	Clio Awards	Fan Engagement - Experiential	Blue Electric Light	Nominated

== See also ==
- Category:Works by Lenny Kravitz
- List of artists who reached number one on the U.S. Mainstream Rock chart
- List of artists who reached number one on the U.S. Modern Rock chart
- List of artists who reached number one on the UK Singles Chart
- List of artists who reached number one on the Australian singles chart
- List of blues musicians
- List of Gibson players
- List of Number 1 albums from the 1990s (UK)
- List of Number 1 singles from the 1990s (UK)
- List of performers on Top of the Pops
- List of Saturday Night Live hosts and musical guests

== General sources ==
- di Martino, Dave. Singer-songwriters: Pop music's performer-composers, from A to Zevon, Billboard Books, 1994.
- Gregory, Hugh. 1000 Great Guitarists: Rock, Jazz, Country, Funk ..., Balafon Books, 1994.
- la Blanc, Michael (ed.). Contemporary musicians, Vol. 5, Gale Research, 1991.
- Larkin, Colin. The Guinness Encyclopedia of Popular Music, Guinness Publishing, 1992.
- Whitburn, Joel. The Billboard Book of Top 40 Hits, 5th edition, Watson-Guptill Publications, 1992.

Awards and achievements
Grammy Award
Preceded by Bob Dylan for "Cold Irons Bound"	Best Male Rock Vocal Performance; 1999 for "Fly Away"	Succeeded by Lenny Kravitz for "American Woman"
Preceded by Lenny Kravitz for "Fly Away"	Best Male Rock Vocal Performance; 2000 for "American Woman"	Succeeded by Lenny Kravitz for "Again"
Preceded by Lenny Kravitz for "American Woman"	Best Male Rock Vocal Performance; 2001 for "Again"	Succeeded by Lenny Kravitz for "Dig In"
Preceded by Lenny Kravitz for "Again"	Best Male Rock Vocal Performance; 2002 for "Dig In"	Succeeded by Bruce Springsteen for "The Rising"
MTV Video Music Awards
Preceded by Eric Clapton for "Tears in Heaven"	Best Male Video; 1993 for "Are You Gonna Go My Way"	Succeeded by Tom Petty and the Heartbreakers for "Mary Jane's Last Dance"

Preceded by Nelly Furtado	Grey Cup Halftime Show; 2007	Succeeded by Theory of a Deadman
