= 95th Academy Awards =

- Official poster
- Date: March 12, 2023
- Site: Dolby Theatre; Hollywood, Los Angeles, California, U.S.
- Hosted by: Jimmy Kimmel
- Preshow hosts: Ashley Graham; Vanessa Hudgens; Lilly Singh
- Produced by: Glenn Weiss; Ricky Kirshner
- Directed by: Glenn Weiss

Highlights
- Best Picture: Everything Everywhere All at Once
- Most awards: Everything Everywhere All at Once (7)
- Most nominations: Everything Everywhere All at Once (11)

TV in the United States
- Network: ABC
- Duration: 3 hours, 37 minutes
- Ratings: 18.75 million; 9.9% (Nielsen ratings)

The 95th Academy Awards ceremony, presented by the Academy of Motion Picture Arts and Sciences (AMPAS), took place on March 12, 2023, at the Dolby Theatre in Hollywood, Los Angeles. During the gala, the AMPAS presented Academy Awards (commonly referred to as Oscars) in 23 categories honoring films released in 2022. The ceremony, televised in the United States by ABC, was produced by Glenn Weiss and Ricky Kirshner, with Weiss also serving as director. Comedian Jimmy Kimmel hosted the show for the third time, following the 89th ceremony in 2017 and the 90th ceremony in 2018.

In related events, the Academy held its 13th annual Governors Awards ceremony at the Fairmont Century Plaza Hotel in Century City, California, on November 19, 2022. The Academy Scientific and Technical Awards were presented by host Simu Liu on February 24, 2023, in a ceremony at the Academy Museum of Motion Pictures in Los Angeles.

Everything Everywhere All at Once won seven awards, including Best Picture. Other winners included All Quiet on the Western Front with four awards, The Whale with two, and Avatar: The Way of Water, Black Panther: Wakanda Forever, The Boy, the Mole, the Fox and the Horse, The Elephant Whisperers, Guillermo del Toro's Pinocchio, An Irish Goodbye, Navalny, RRR, Top Gun: Maverick, and Women Talking with one. The telecast drew 18.75 million viewers in the United States.

== Winners and nominees ==
The nominees for the 95th Academy Awards were announced on January 24, 2023, at the Samuel Goldwyn Theater in Beverly Hills, by actors Riz Ahmed and Allison Williams. Everything Everywhere All at Once led all nominees with eleven nominations; All Quiet on the Western Front and The Banshees of Inisherin tied for second with nine nominations each.

The winners were announced during the awards ceremony on March 12, 2023. Everything Everywhere All at Once became the first science fiction film to win Best Picture, and became the third film, alongside A Streetcar Named Desire (1951) and Network (1976), to win three acting awards. Best Director winners Daniel Kwan and Daniel Scheinert became the third pair of directors to win for the same film. (Note: Jerome Robbins and Robert Wise first achieved this distinction for co-directing West Side Story (1961). Brothers Joel Coen and Ethan Coen later earned this same feat for their direction of No Country for Old Men (2007).) For the first time since the 7th ceremony in 1935, all five Best Actor nominees were first-time nominees. Michelle Yeoh became the first Asian winner for Best Actress and the second woman of color overall after Halle Berry, who won for her performance in Monster's Ball (2001). Furthermore, she became the first woman to identify as Asian to be nominated in that category. (Note: Many consider Merle Oberon, who was nominated for her role in The Dark Angel (1935), to be the first Asian nominee in this category, but she hid her mixed-race heritage due to fears regarding discrimination and the impact it would have on her career.) Ke Huy Quan became the first Vietnamese person to win an Oscar and the second Asian winner for Best Supporting Actor after Haing S. Ngor, who won for his role in The Killing Fields (1984).

The 42-year span between Judd Hirsch's first nomination, for his supporting role in Ordinary People (1980), and his second, for The Fabelmans, set the record for the longest gap between Oscar nominations. At age 90, Best Original Score nominee John Williams became the oldest person nominated competitively in Oscars history. Best Costume Design winner Ruth E. Carter became the first Black woman to win two Oscars.

=== Awards ===
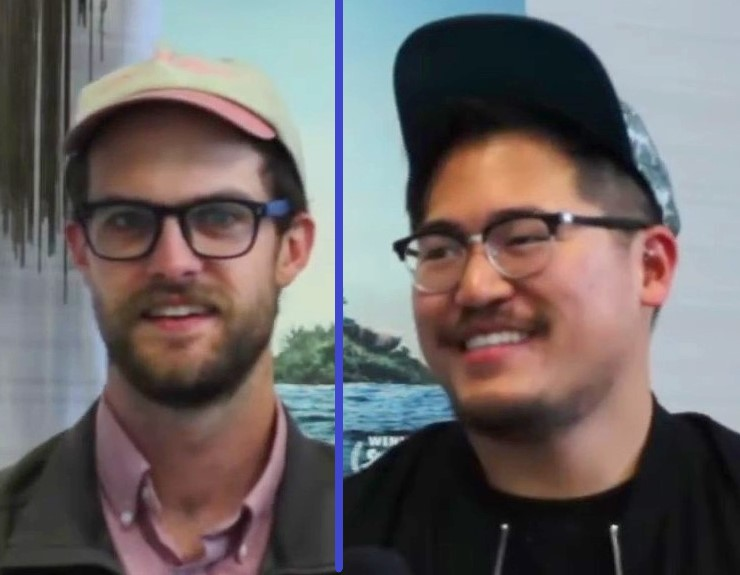
Daniel Scheinert and Daniel Kwan, Best Picture co-winners, and Best Director and Best Original Screenplay winners

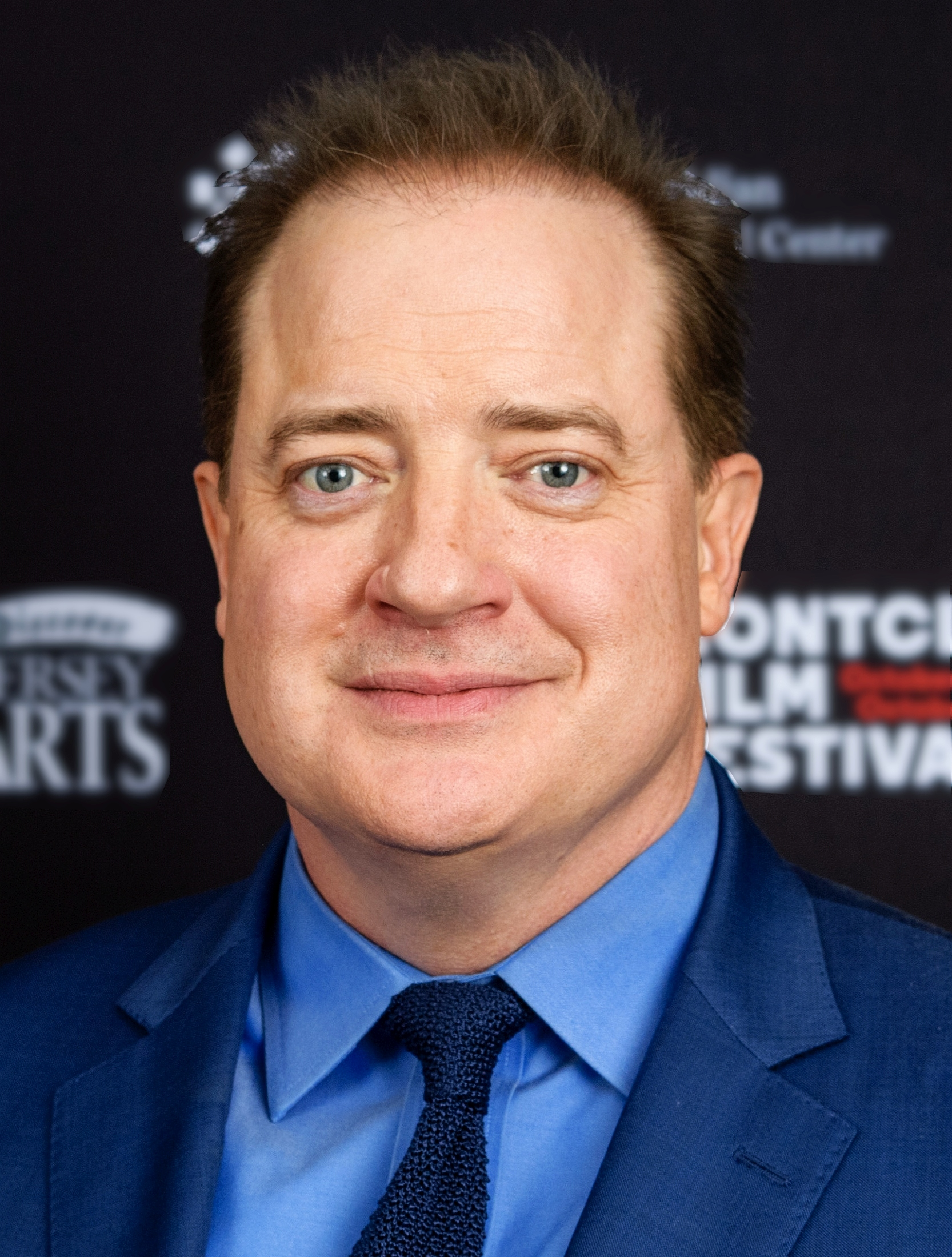
Brendan Fraser, Best Actor winner

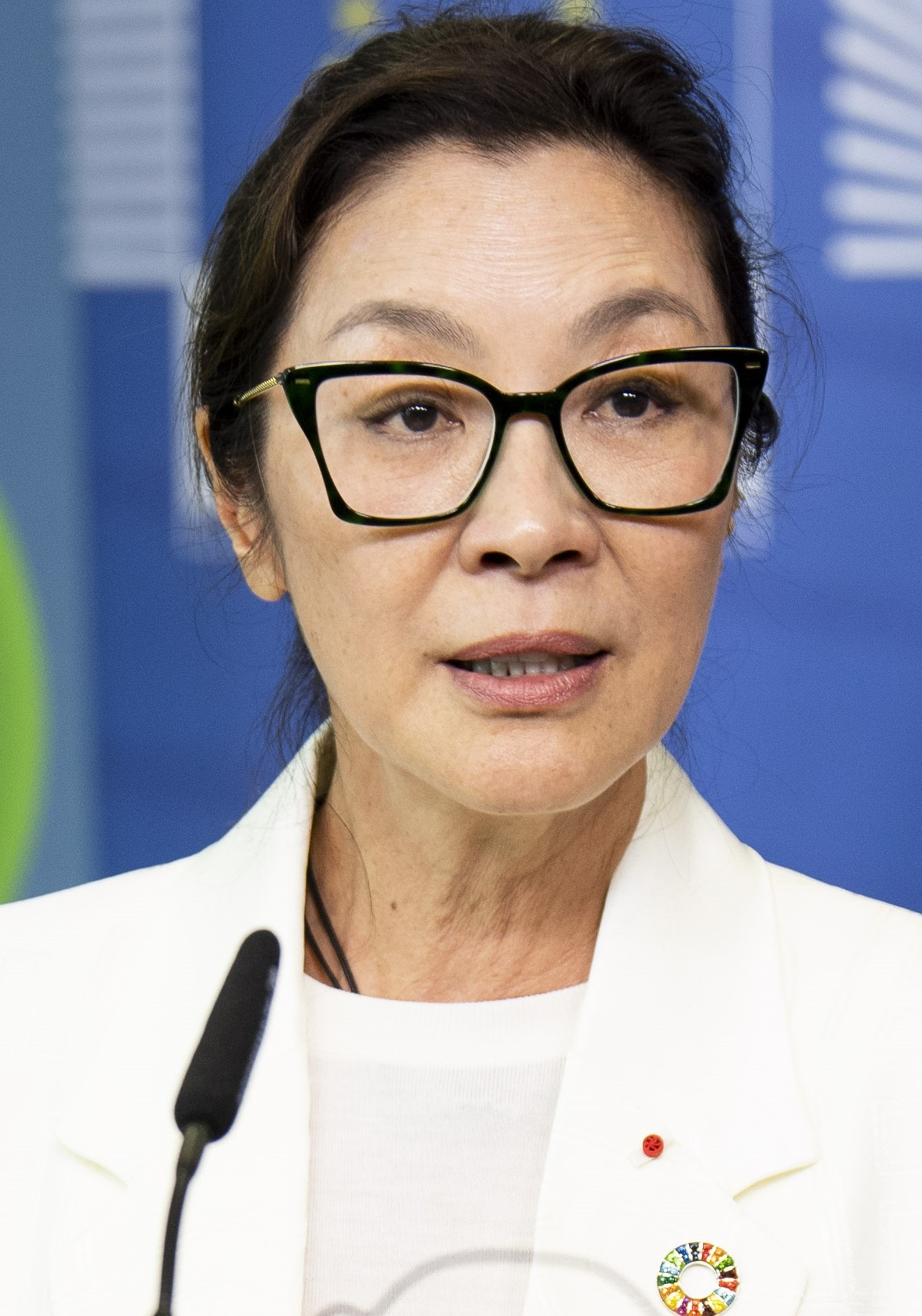
Michelle Yeoh, Best Actress winner

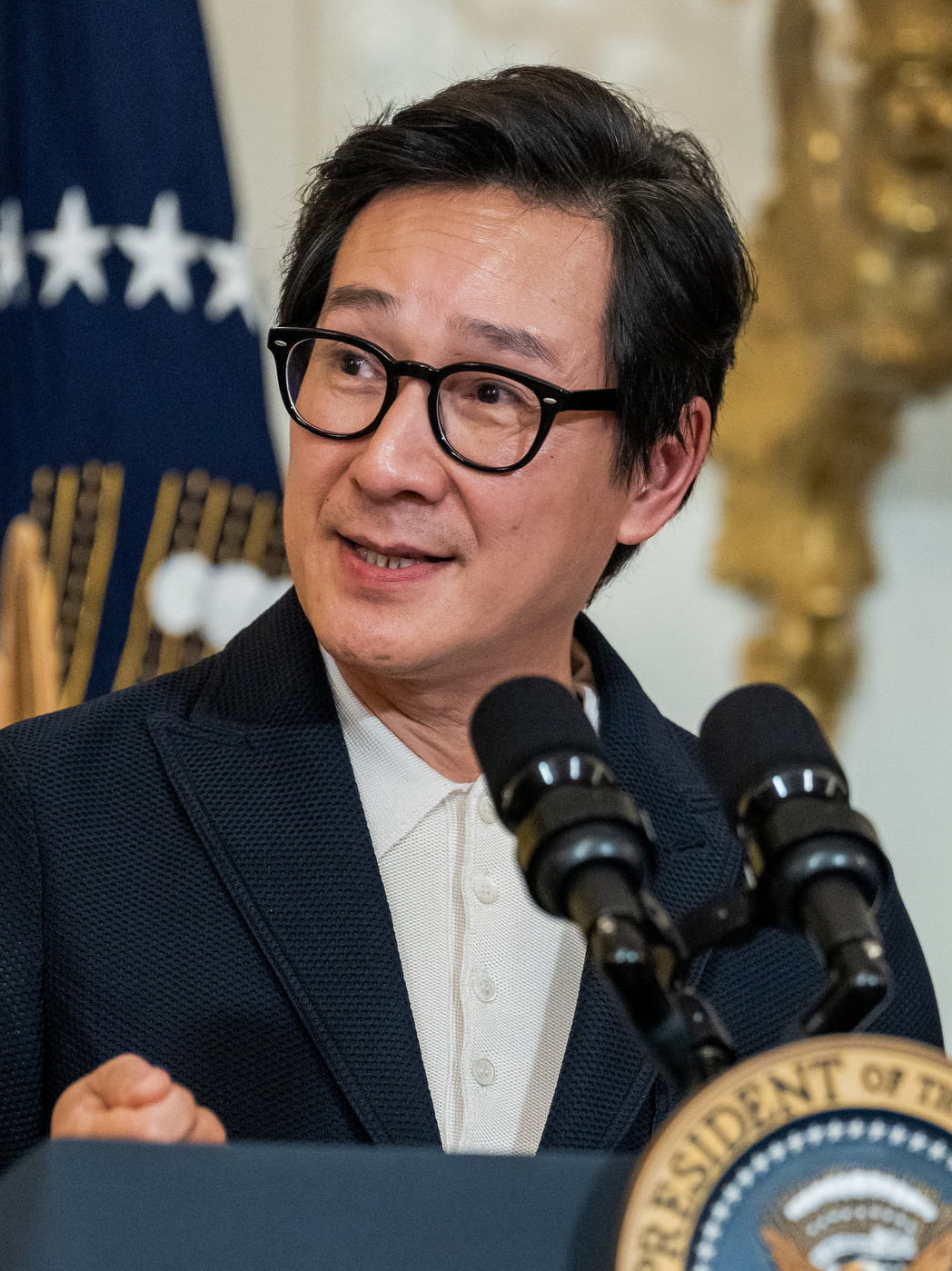
Ke Huy Quan, Best Supporting Actor winner

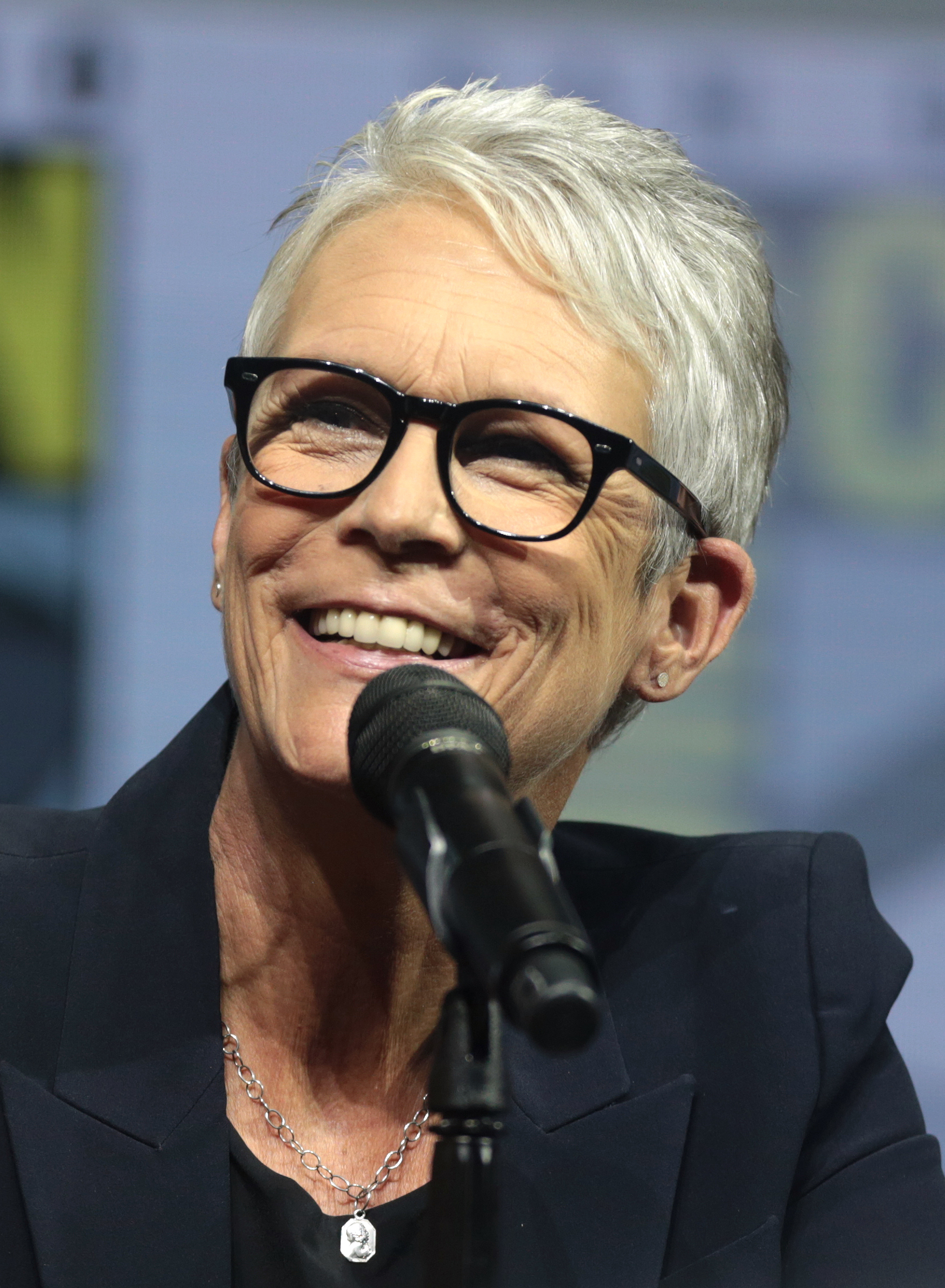
Jamie Lee Curtis, Best Supporting Actress winner

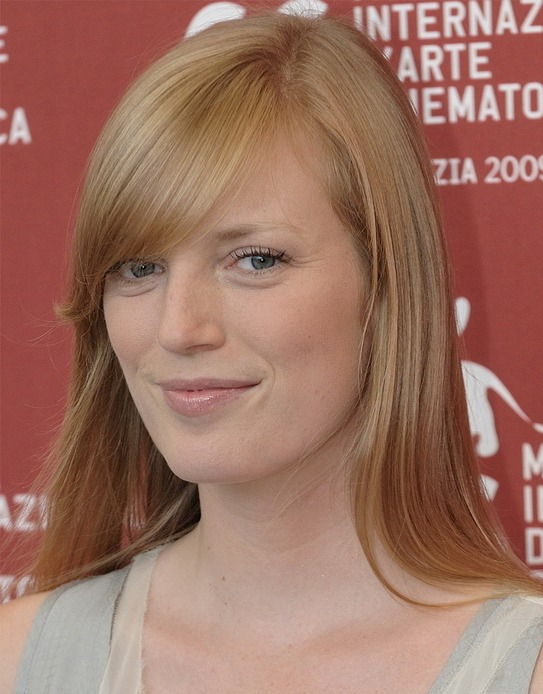
Sarah Polley, Best Adapted Screenplay winner

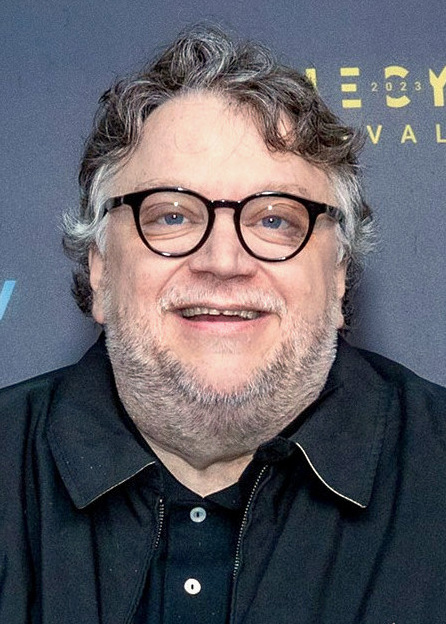
Guillermo del Toro, Best Animated Feature co-winner

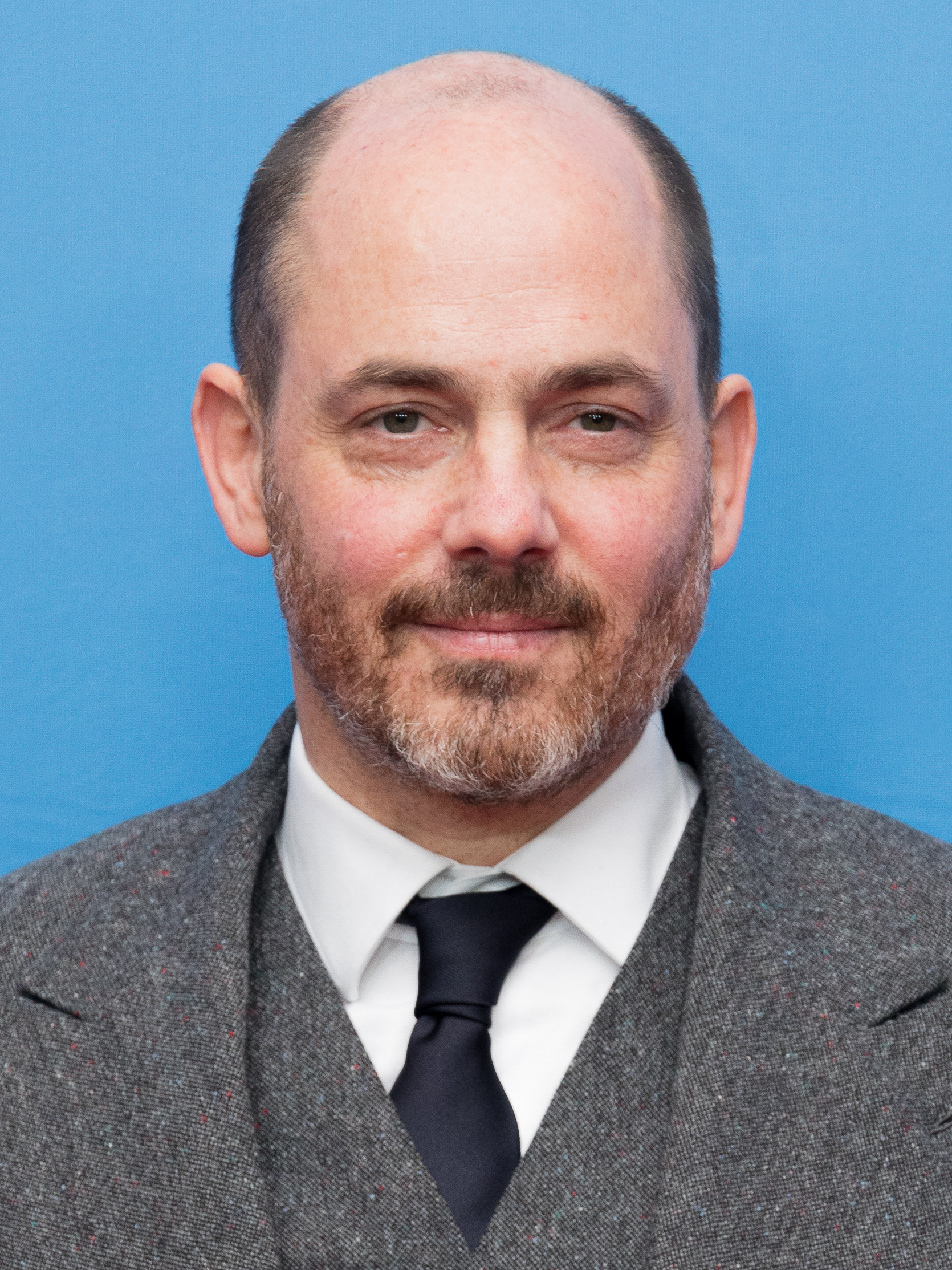
Edward Berger, Best International Feature Film winner

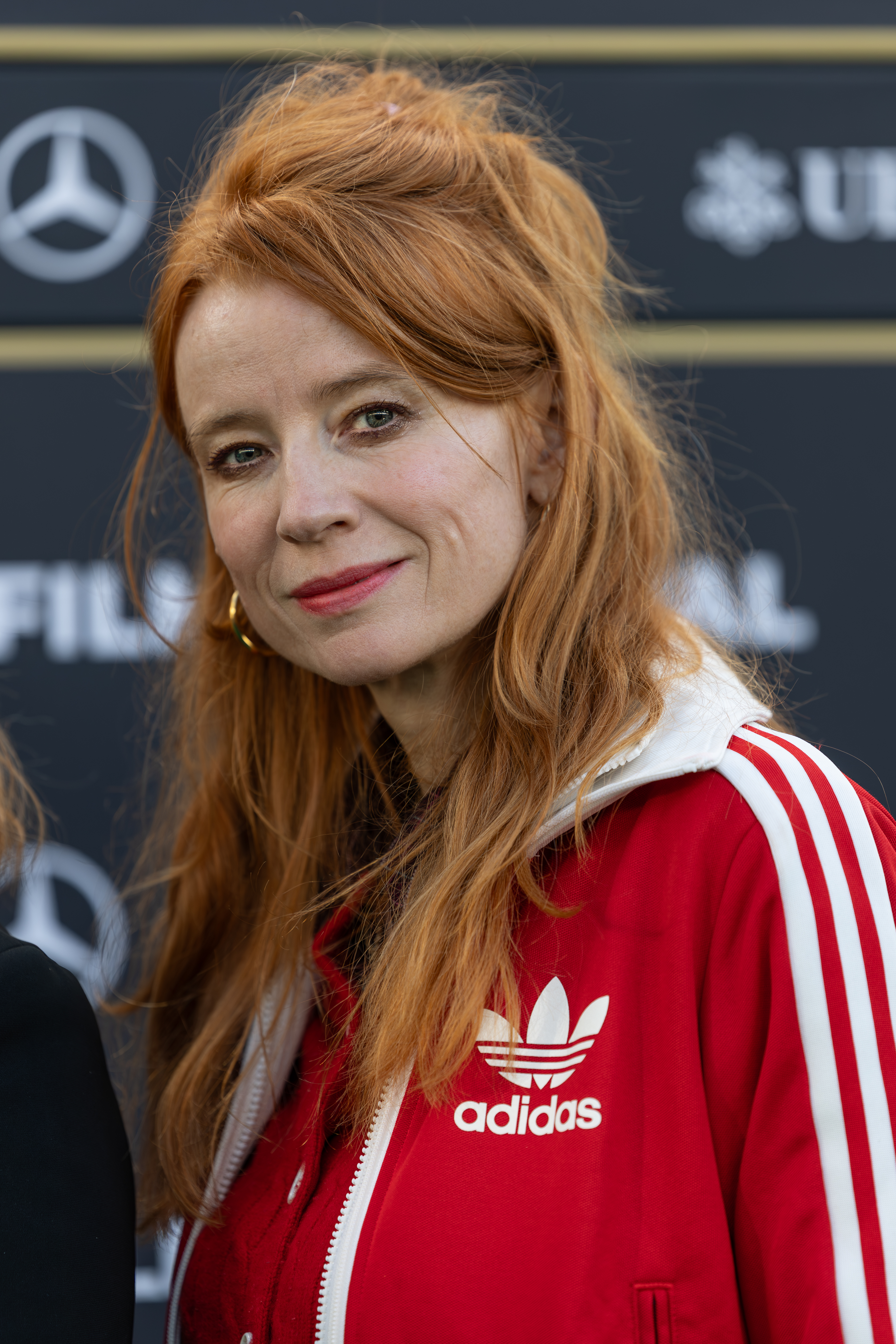
Odessa Rae, Best Documentary Feature Film co-winner

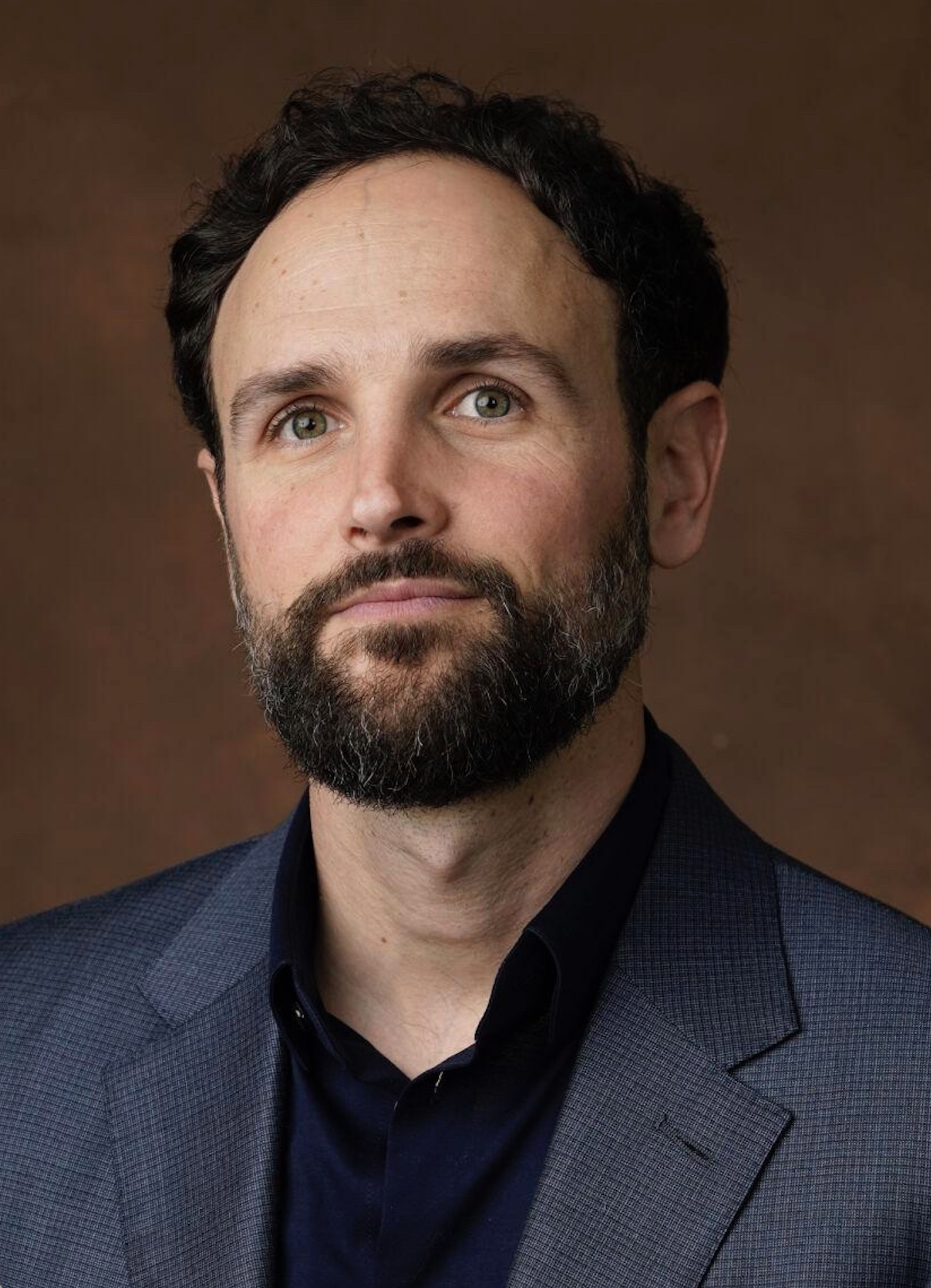
Shane Boris, Best Documentary Feature Film co-winner

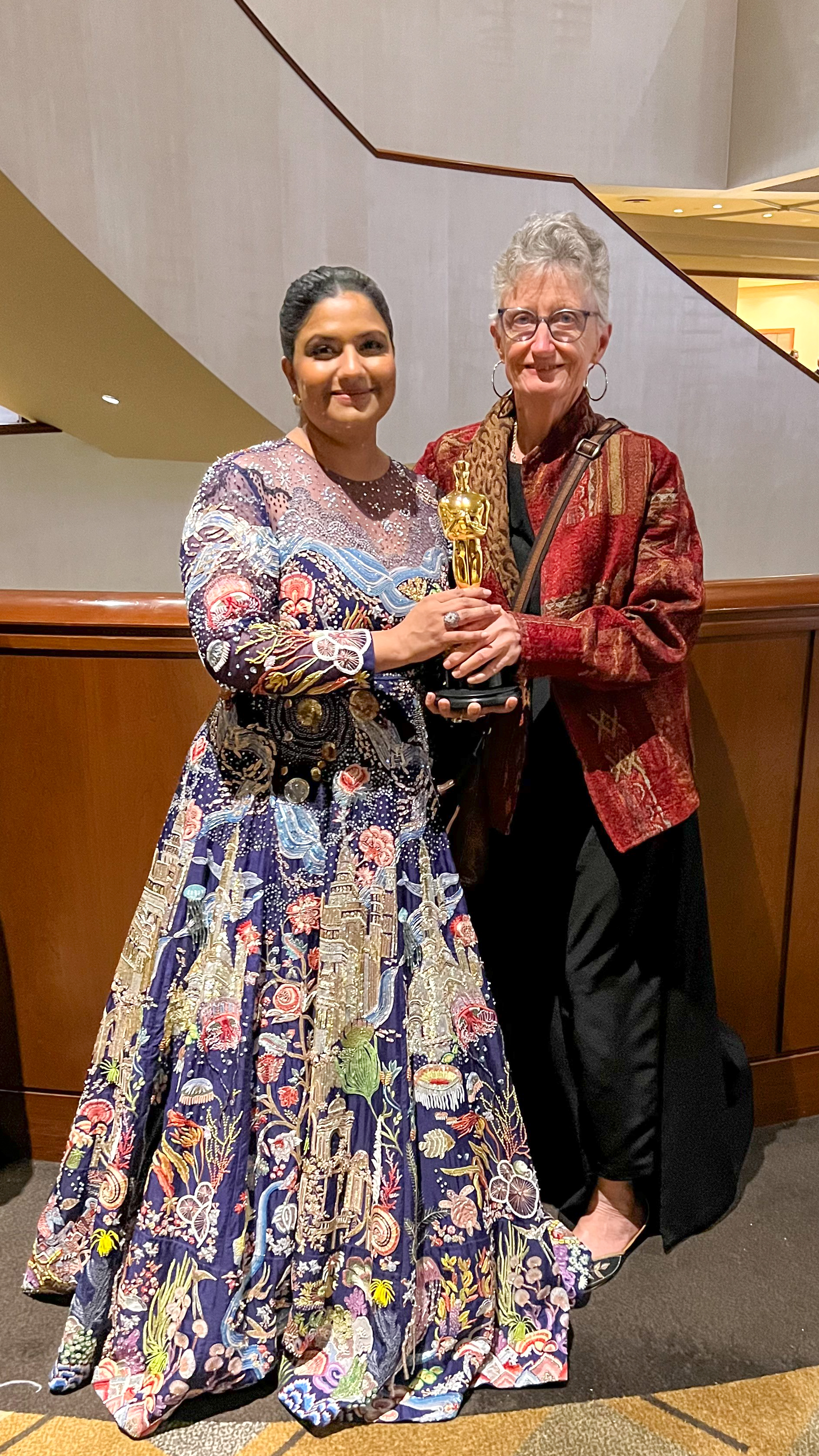
Kartiki Gonsalves (left), Best Documentary Short Film co-winner, holding her award

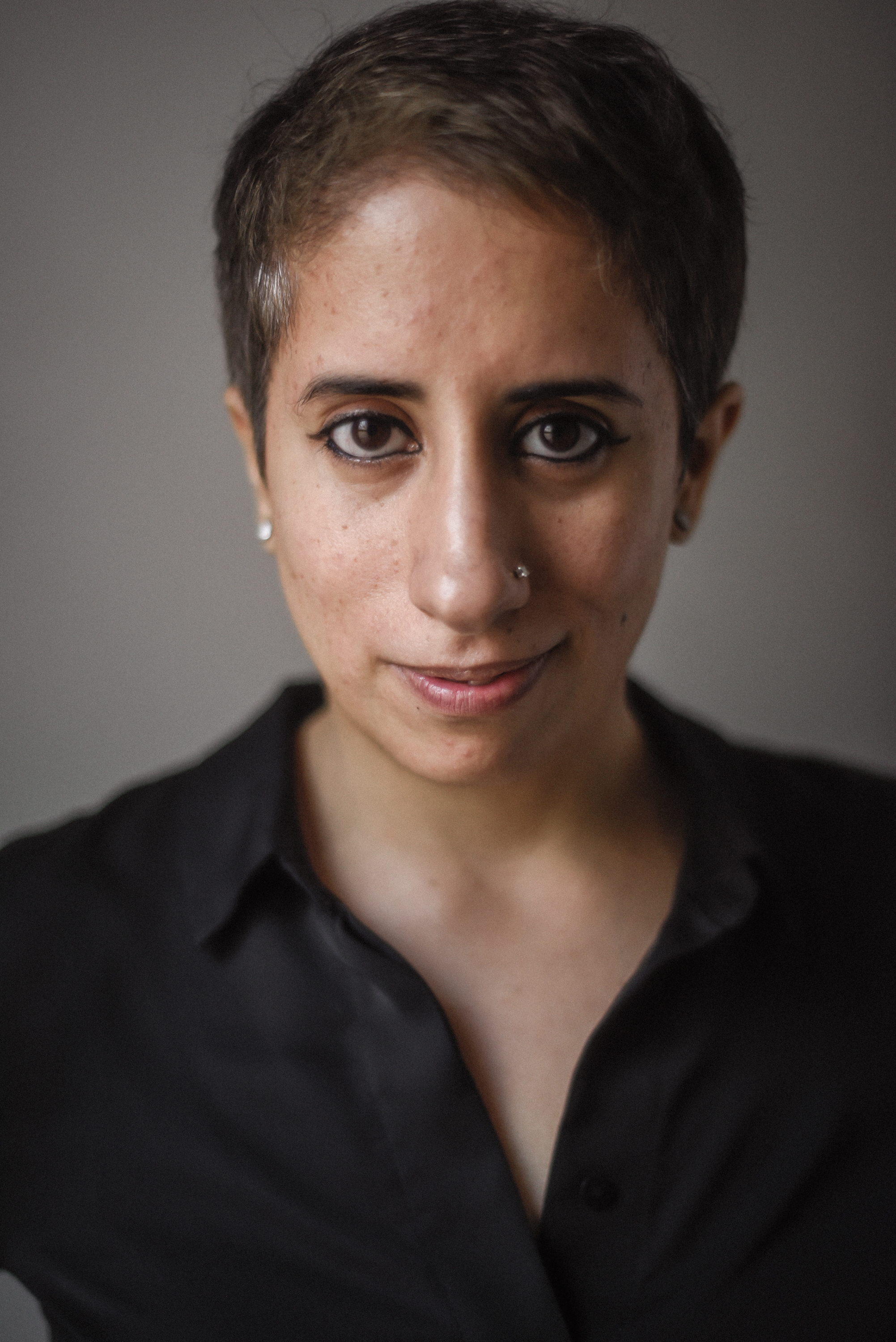
Guneet Monga, Best Documentary Short Film co-winner

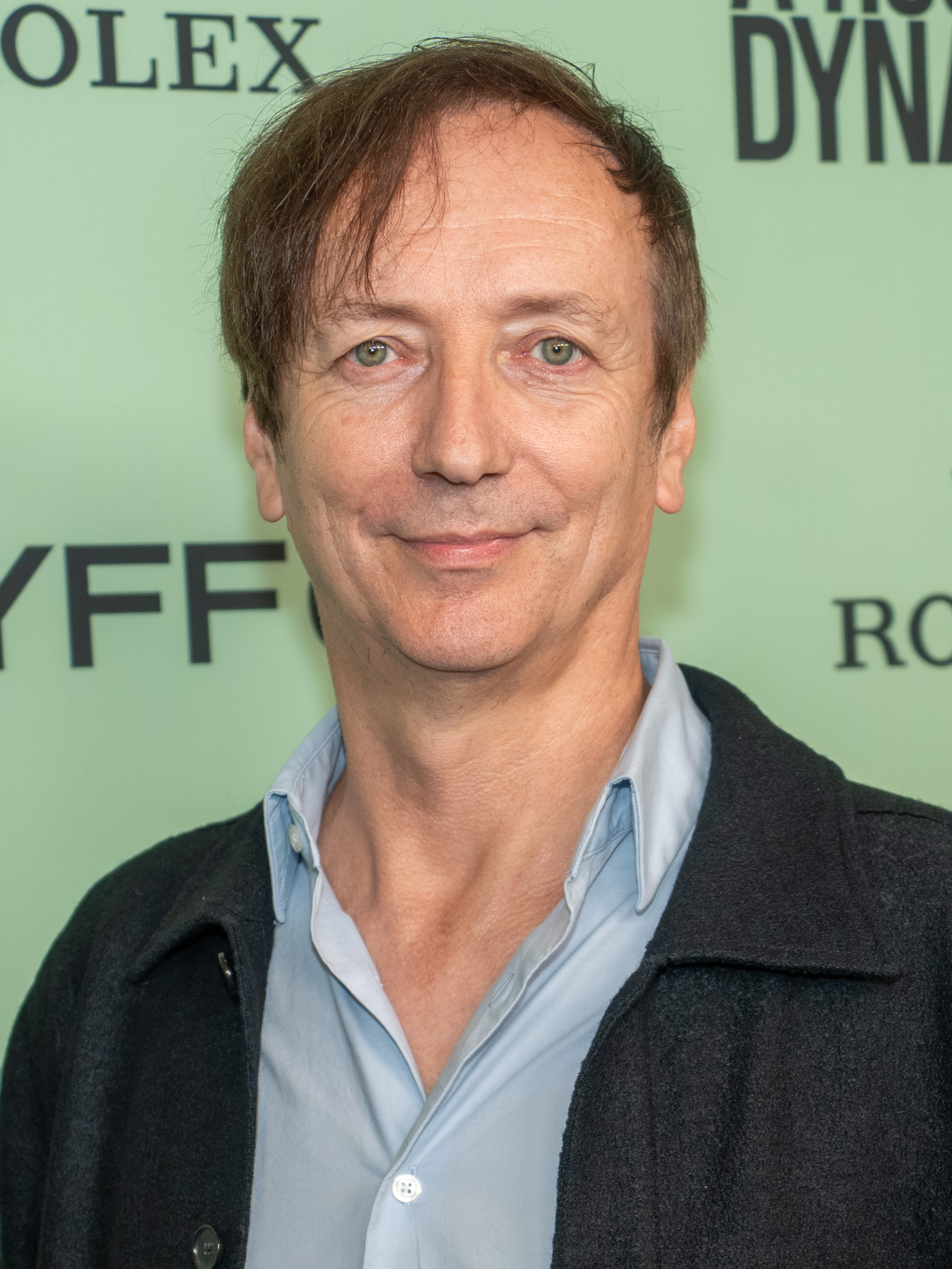
Volker Bertelmann, Best Original Score winner

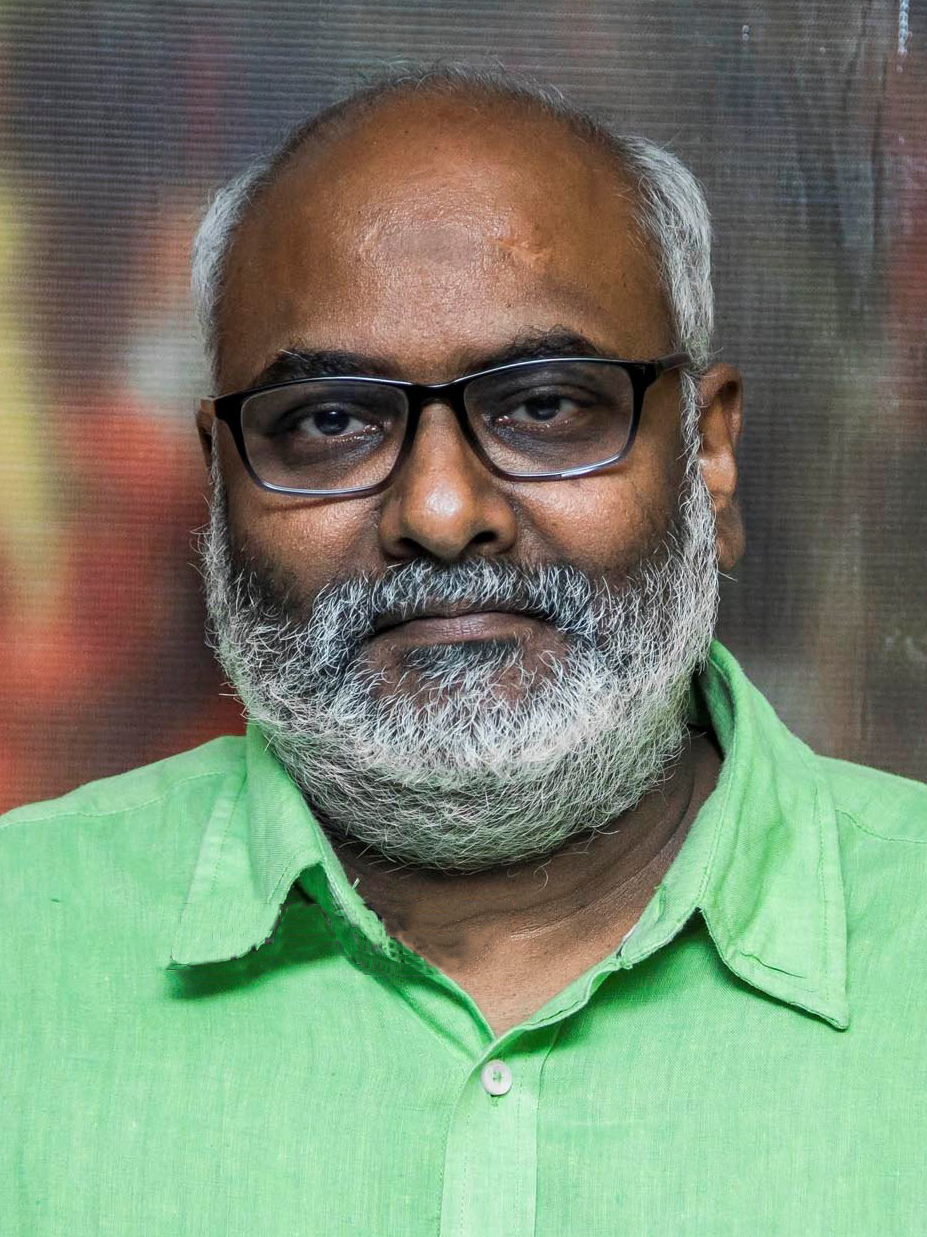
M. M. Keeravani, Best Original Song co-winner

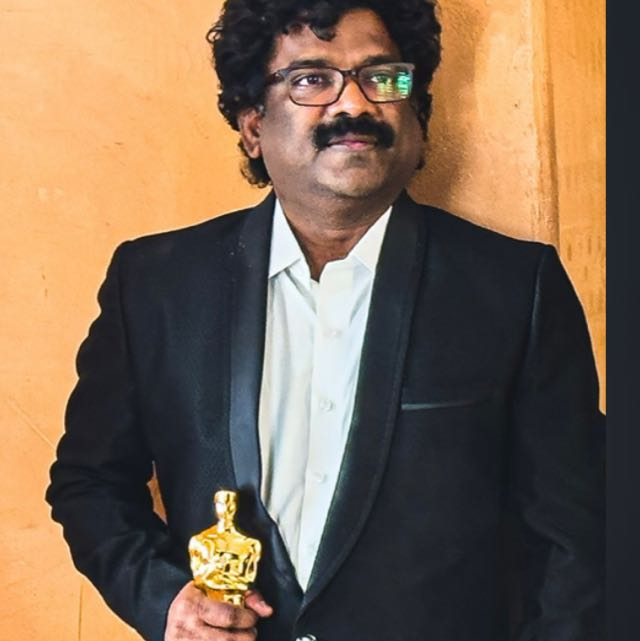
Chandrabose, Best Original Song co-winner, holding his award

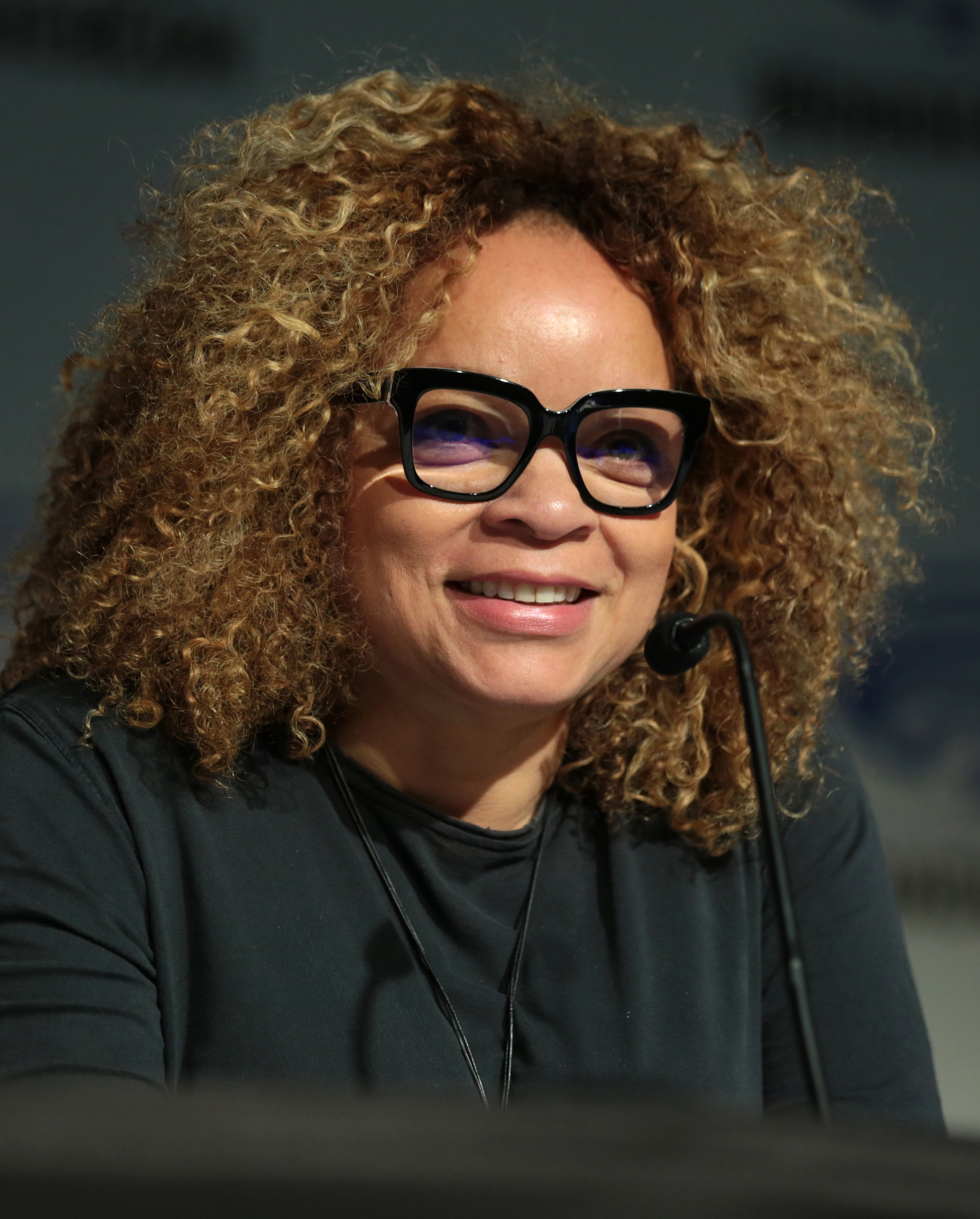
Ruth E. Carter, Best Costume Design winner

Winners are listed first, highlighted in boldface, and indicated with a double dagger (‡).

**Best Picture**: **Everything Everywhere All at Once – Daniel Kwan, Daniel Scheinert, and Jonathan Wang, producers**‡; All Quiet on the Western Front – Malte Grunert, producer; Avatar: The Way of Water – James Cameron and Jon Landau, producers; The Banshees of Inisherin – Graham Broadbent, Pete Czernin, and Martin McDonagh, producers; Elvis – Baz Luhrmann, Catherine Martin, Gail Berman, Patrick McCormick, and Schuyler Weiss, producers; The Fabelmans – Kristie Macosko Krieger, Steven Spielberg, and Tony Kushner, producers; Tár – Todd Field, Alexandra Milchan, and Scott Lambert, producers; Top Gun: Maverick – Tom Cruise, Christopher McQuarrie, David Ellison, and Jerry Bruckheimer, producers; Triangle of Sadness – Erik Hemmendorff and Philippe Bober, producers; Women Talking – Dede Gardner, Jeremy Kleiner, and Frances McDormand, producers	**Best Directing**: **Daniel Kwan and Daniel Scheinert – Everything Everywhere All at Once**‡; Martin McDonagh – The Banshees of Inisherin; Steven Spielberg – The Fabelmans; Todd Field – Tár; Ruben Östlund – Triangle of Sadness
**Best Actor in a Leading Role**: **Brendan Fraser – The Whale as Charlie**‡; Austin Butler – Elvis as Elvis Presley; Colin Farrell – The Banshees of Inisherin as Pádraic Súilleabháin; Paul Mescal – Aftersun as Calum Patterson; Bill Nighy – Living as Mr. Rodney Williams	**Best Actress in a Leading Role**: **Michelle Yeoh – Everything Everywhere All at Once as Evelyn Quan Wang**‡; Cate Blanchett – Tár as Lydia Tár; Ana de Armas – Blonde as Norma Jeane; Andrea Riseborough – To Leslie as Leslie Rowlands; Michelle Williams – The Fabelmans as Mitzi Fabelman
**Best Actor in a Supporting Role**: **Ke Huy Quan – Everything Everywhere All at Once as Waymond Wang**‡; Brendan Gleeson – The Banshees of Inisherin as Colm Doherty; Brian Tyree Henry – Causeway as James Aucoin; Judd Hirsch – The Fabelmans as Uncle Boris; Barry Keoghan – The Banshees of Inisherin as Dominic Kearney	**Best Actress in a Supporting Role**: **Jamie Lee Curtis – Everything Everywhere All at Once as Deirdre Beaubeirdre**‡; Angela Bassett – Black Panther: Wakanda Forever as Queen Ramonda; Hong Chau – The Whale as Liz; Kerry Condon – The Banshees of Inisherin as Siobhán Súilleabháin; Stephanie Hsu – Everything Everywhere All at Once as Joy Wang / Jobu Tupaki
**Best Writing (Original Screenplay)**: **Everything Everywhere All at Once – Daniel Kwan and Daniel Scheinert**‡; The Banshees of Inisherin – Martin McDonagh; The Fabelmans – Steven Spielberg and Tony Kushner; Tár – Todd Field; Triangle of Sadness – Ruben Östlund	**Best Writing (Adapted Screenplay)**: **Women Talking – Sarah Polley; based on the novel by Miriam Toews**‡; All Quiet on the Western Front – Edward Berger, Lesley Paterson, and Ian Stokell; based on the novel by Erich Maria Remarque; Glass Onion: A Knives Out Mystery – Rian Johnson; based on characters created by Johnson and the film Knives Out; Living – Kazuo Ishiguro; based on the original motion picture screenplay Ikiru by Akira Kurosawa, Shinobu Hashimoto, and Hideo Oguni; Top Gun: Maverick – Screenplay by Ehren Kruger, Eric Warren Singer, and Christopher McQuarrie; story by Peter Craig and Justin Marks; based on the film Top Gun written by Jim Cash and Jack Epps Jr.
**Best Animated Feature Film**: **Guillermo del Toro's Pinocchio – Guillermo del Toro, Mark Gustafson, Gary Ungar, and Alex Bulkley**‡; Marcel the Shell with Shoes On – Dean Fleischer Camp, Elisabeth Holm, Andrew Goldman, Caroline Kaplan, and Paul Mezey; Puss in Boots: The Last Wish – Joel Crawford and Mark Swift; The Sea Beast – Chris Williams and Jed Schlanger; Turning Red – Domee Shi and Lindsey Collins	**Best International Feature Film**: **All Quiet on the Western Front (Germany) – directed by Edward Berger**‡; Argentina, 1985 (Argentina) – directed by Santiago Mitre; Close (Belgium) – directed by Lukas Dhont; EO (Poland) – directed by Jerzy Skolimowski; The Quiet Girl (Ireland) – directed by Colm Bairéad
**Best Documentary Feature Film**: **Navalny – Daniel Roher, Odessa Rae, Diane Becker, Melanie Miller, and Shane Boris**‡; All That Breathes – Shaunak Sen, Aman Mann, and Teddy Leifer; All the Beauty and the Bloodshed – Laura Poitras, Howard Gertler, John Lyons, Nan Goldin, and Yoni Golijov; Fire of Love – Sara Dosa, Shane Boris, and Ina Fichman; A House Made of Splinters – Simon Lereng Wilmont and Monica Hellström	**Best Documentary Short Film**: **The Elephant Whisperers – Kartiki Gonsalves and Guneet Monga**‡; Haulout – Evgenia Arbugaeva and Maxim Arbugaev; How Do You Measure a Year? – Jay Rosenblatt; The Martha Mitchell Effect – Anne Alvergue and Beth Levison; Stranger at the Gate – Joshua Seftel and Conall Jones
**Best Short Film (Live Action)**: **An Irish Goodbye – Tom Berkeley and Ross White**‡; Ivalu – Anders Walter and Rebecca Pruzan; Le pupille – Alice Rohrwacher and Alfonso Cuarón; Night Ride – Eirik Tveiten and Gaute Lid Larssen; The Red Suitcase – Cyrus Neshvad	**Best Short Film (Animated)**: **The Boy, the Mole, the Fox and the Horse – Charlie Mackesy and Matthew Freud**‡; The Flying Sailor – Amanda Forbis and Wendy Tilby; Ice Merchants – João Gonzalez and Bruno Caetano; My Year of Dicks – Sara Gunnarsdóttir and Pamela Ribon; An Ostrich Told Me the World Is Fake and I Think I Believe It – Lachlan Pendragon
**Best Music (Original Score)**: **All Quiet on the Western Front – Volker Bertelmann**‡; Babylon – Justin Hurwitz; The Banshees of Inisherin – Carter Burwell; Everything Everywhere All at Once – Son Lux; The Fabelmans – John Williams	**Best Music (Original Song)**: **"Naatu Naatu" from RRR – Music by M. M. Keeravani; lyrics by Chandrabose**‡; "Applause" from Tell It Like a Woman – Music and lyrics by Diane Warren; "Hold My Hand" from Top Gun: Maverick – Music and lyrics by Lady Gaga and BloodPop; "Lift Me Up" from Black Panther: Wakanda Forever – Music by Tems, Rihanna, Ryan Coogler, and Ludwig Göransson; lyrics by Tems and Ryan Coogler; "This Is a Life" from Everything Everywhere All at Once – Music by Ryan Lott, David Byrne, and Mitski; lyrics by Ryan Lott and David Byrne
**Best Sound**: **Top Gun: Maverick – Mark Weingarten, James H. Mather, Al Nelson, Chris Burdon, and Mark Taylor**‡; All Quiet on the Western Front – Viktor Prášil, Frank Kruse, Markus Stemler, Lars Ginzel, and Stefan Korte; Avatar: The Way of Water – Julian Howarth, Gwendolyn Yates Whittle, Dick Bernstein, Christopher Boyes, Gary Summers, and Michael Hedges; The Batman – Stuart Wilson, William Files, Douglas Murray, and Andy Nelson; Elvis – David Lee, Wayne Pashley, Andy Nelson, and Michael Keller	**Best Production Design**: **All Quiet on the Western Front – Production design: Christian M. Goldbeck; set decoration: Ernestine Hipper**‡; Avatar: The Way of Water – Production design: Dylan Cole and Ben Procter; set decoration: Vanessa Cole; Babylon – Production design: Florencia Martin; set decoration: Anthony Carlino; Elvis – Production design: Catherine Martin and Karen Murphy; set decoration: Bev Dunn; The Fabelmans – Production design: Rick Carter; set decoration: Karen O'Hara
**Best Cinematography**: **All Quiet on the Western Front – James Friend**‡; Bardo, False Chronicle of a Handful of Truths – Darius Khondji; Elvis – Mandy Walker; Empire of Light – Roger Deakins; Tár – Florian Hoffmeister	**Best Makeup and Hairstyling**: **The Whale – Adrien Morot, Judy Chin, and Annemarie Bradley**‡; All Quiet on the Western Front – Heike Merker and Linda Eisenhamerová; The Batman – Naomi Donne, Mike Marino, and Mike Fontaine; Black Panther: Wakanda Forever – Camille Friend and Joel Harlow; Elvis – Mark Coulier, Jason Baird, and Aldo Signoretti
**Best Costume Design**: **Black Panther: Wakanda Forever – Ruth Carter**‡; Babylon – Mary Zophres; Elvis – Catherine Martin; Everything Everywhere All at Once – Shirley Kurata; Mrs. Harris Goes to Paris – Jenny Beavan	**Best Film Editing**: **Everything Everywhere All at Once – Paul Rogers**‡; The Banshees of Inisherin – Mikkel E. G. Nielsen; Elvis – Matt Villa and Jonathan Redmond; Tár – Monika Willi; Top Gun: Maverick – Eddie Hamilton
**Best Visual Effects**: **Avatar: The Way of Water – Joe Letteri, Richard Baneham, Eric Saindon, and Daniel Barrett**‡; All Quiet on the Western Front – Frank Petzold, Viktor Müller, Markus Frank, and Kamil Jafar; The Batman – Dan Lemmon, Russell Earl, Anders Langlands, and Dominic Tuohy; Black Panther: Wakanda Forever – Geoffrey Baumann, Craig Hammack, R. Christopher White, and Dan Sudick; Top Gun: Maverick – Ryan Tudhope, Seth Hill, Bryan Litson, and Scott R. Fisher

=== Governors Awards ===
The Academy held its 13th annual Governors Awards ceremony on November 19, 2022, during which the following awards were presented:

==== Honorary Awards ====
- To Euzhan Palcy, a masterful filmmaker who broke ground for Black women directors and inspired storytellers of all kinds across the globe.
- To Diane Warren, for her genius, generosity and passionate commitment to the power of song in film.
- To Peter Weir, a fearless and consummate filmmaker who has illuminated the human experience with his unique and expansive body of work.

==== Jean Hersholt Humanitarian Award ====
- Michael J. Fox – "For his tireless advocacy of research on Parkinson's disease alongside his boundless optimism exemplifies the impact of one person in changing the future for millions."

=== Films with multiple nominations and awards ===
Films with multiple nominations
Nominations	Film
11	Everything Everywhere All at Once
9	All Quiet on the Western Front
9	The Banshees of Inisherin
8	Elvis
7	The Fabelmans
6	Tár
6	Top Gun: Maverick
5	Black Panther: Wakanda Forever
4	Avatar: The Way of Water
3	Babylon
3	The Batman
3	Triangle of Sadness
3	The Whale
2	Living
2	Women Talking

Films with multiple wins
Awards	Film
7	Everything Everywhere All at Once
4	All Quiet on the Western Front
2	The Whale

== Presenters and performers ==
The following individuals, listed in order of appearance, presented awards or performed musical numbers:

Presenters
Name(s)	Role
Sylvia Villagran	Served as announcer for the 95th Academy Awards
Emily Blunt; Dwayne Johnson	Presented the award for Best Animated Feature
Ariana DeBose; Troy Kotsur	Presented the awards for Best Supporting Actor and Best Supporting Actress
Cara Delevingne	Introduced the performance of "Applause"
Riz Ahmed; Ahmir "Questlove" Thompson	Presented the awards for Best Documentary Feature Film and Best Live Action Short Film
Halle Bailey; Melissa McCarthy	Presented the trailer for The Little Mermaid
Michael B. Jordan; Jonathan Majors	Presented the award for Best Cinematography
Donnie Yen	Introduced the performance of "This Is a Life"
Jennifer Connelly; Samuel L. Jackson	Presented the award for Best Makeup and Hairstyling
Morgan Freeman; Margot Robbie	Presented the Warner Bros. 100 Years tribute
Paul Dano; Julia Louis-Dreyfus	Presented the award for Best Costume Design
Deepika Padukone	Introduced the performance of "Naatu Naatu"
Eva Longoria; Janet Yang	Presented a montage promoting the Academy Museum of Motion Pictures
Antonio Banderas; Salma Hayek Pinault	Presented the award for Best International Feature Film
Elizabeth Olsen; Pedro Pascal	Presented the awards for Best Documentary Short Film and Best Animated Short Film
Hugh Grant; Andie MacDowell	Presented the award for Best Production Design
John Cho; Mindy Kaling	Presented the award for Best Original Score
Elizabeth Banks	Presented the award for Best Visual Effects
Danai Gurira	Introduced the performance of "Lift Me Up"
Andrew Garfield; Florence Pugh	Presented the awards for Best Original Screenplay and Best Adapted Screenplay
Kate Hudson; Janelle Monáe	Presented the awards for Best Sound and Best Original Song
John Travolta	Presented the "In Memoriam" segment
Zoe Saldaña; Sigourney Weaver	Presented the award for Best Film Editing
Idris Elba; Nicole Kidman	Presented the award for Best Director
Halle Berry; Jessica Chastain	Presented the awards for Best Actor and Best Actress
Harrison Ford	Presented the award for Best Picture

Performers
Name	Role	Work
Rickey Minor	Music director; Conductor	Orchestral
Sofia Carson; Diane Warren	Performers	"Applause" from Tell It Like a Woman
David Byrne; Stephanie Hsu; Son Lux	Performers	"This Is a Life" from Everything Everywhere All at Once
Kaala Bhairava; Rahul Sipligunj	Performers	"Naatu Naatu" from RRR
Lady Gaga	Performer	"Hold My Hand" from Top Gun: Maverick
Rihanna	Performer	"Lift Me Up" from Black Panther: Wakanda Forever
Lenny Kravitz	Performer	"Calling All Angels" during the annual "In Memoriam" tribute

== Ceremony information ==
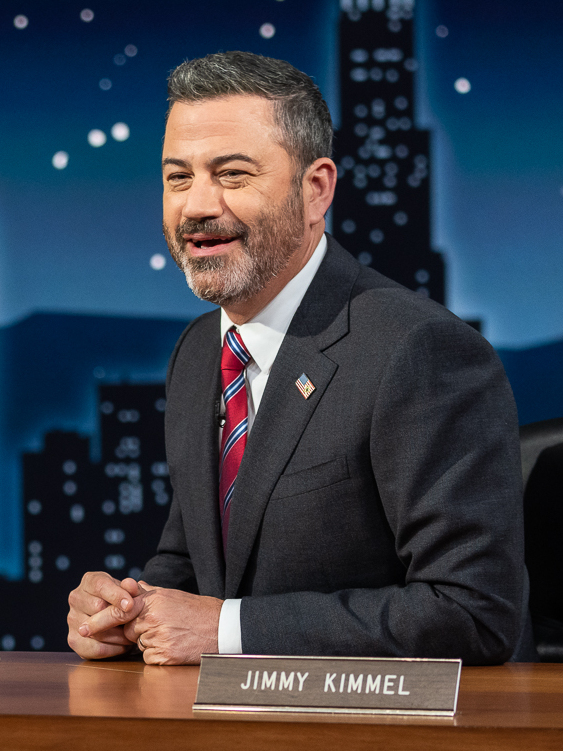
Jimmy Kimmel hosted the 95th Academy Awards.

In September 2022, the Academy hired television producers Glenn Weiss and Ricky Kirshner to oversee production of the 2023 ceremony. Additionally, Weiss was set to direct it for an eighth consecutive year. AMPAS president Janet Yang and CEO Bill Kramer remarked that they looked "to deliver an exciting and energized show" with Weiss and Kirshner. Two months later, comedian and talk show host Jimmy Kimmel was announced as host of the gala. "Being invited to host the Oscars for a third time is either a great honor or a trap," Kimmel stated in a press release regarding his selection. "Either way, I am grateful to the Academy for asking me so quickly after everyone good said no", he concluded. Furthermore, AMPAS announced that all 23 categories would be presented live during the gala. The announcement came in response to an internal survey which indicated negative feedback regarding the previous year's decision to present eight below-the-line categories prior to the live portion of last year's gala.

In light of the Chris Rock–Will Smith slapping incident during the previous year's telecast, AMPAS announced that the organization hired a "crisis team" in the event a similar altercation or if an unexpected fiasco arose. In an interview published by Time magazine, Kramer explained: "We have a whole crisis team, something we've never had before, and many plans in place. We've run many scenarios. So it is our hope that we will be prepared for anything that we may not anticipate right now but that we're planning for just in case it does happen."

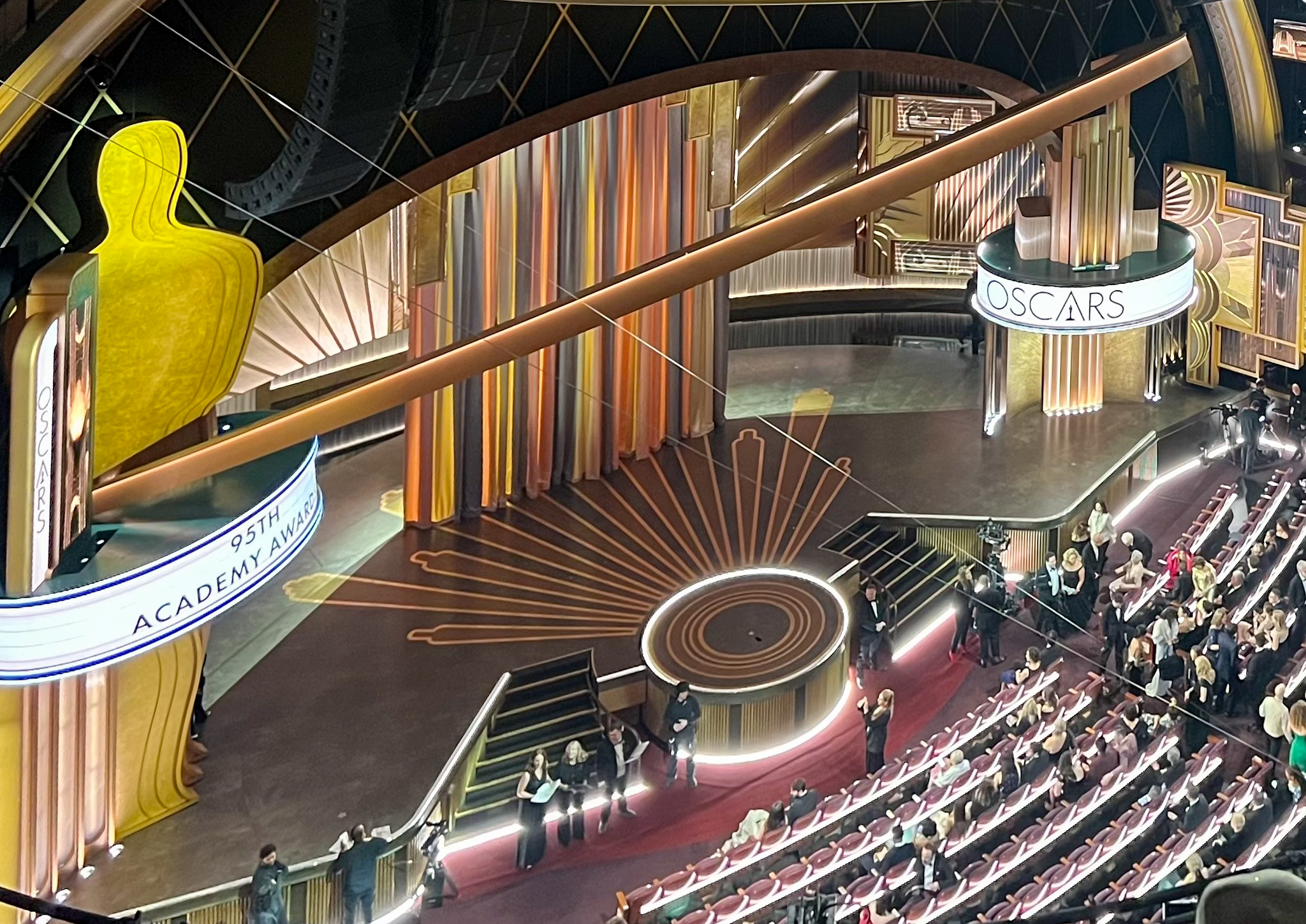
The Dolby Theatre stage on the day of the ceremony

Several others participated in the production of the ceremony and related events. Rickey Minor served as musical director for the ceremony. Production designers Misty Buckley and Alana Billingsley, who were the first women-led design team for an Oscars telecast, designed a new stage for the show. According to Buckley and Billingsley, the stage was designed to resemble Art Deco movie palaces from the Golden Age of Hollywood. Additionally, the set utilized several LED panels that were used to display the category names, winners' names, or images from the nominated films. Notably, the arrivals area along Hollywood Boulevard outside the Dolby Theatre was lined with a champagne-colored carpet, marking the first time since the 32nd ceremony in 1960 that a non-red colored carpet was utilized for the gala. According to red carpet consultant Lisa Love, the production team chose a lighter shade of carpet color in order to not clash with a sienna-colored tent erected to shield attendees from the sun or potential rain. She also added that the shades of color for both the carpet and tent were inspired by "watching the sunset on a white-sand beach at the 'golden hour' with a glass of champagne in hand, evoking calm and peacefulness".

Lady Gaga was initially not scheduled to perform her nominated song "Hold My Hand" from Top Gun: Maverick due to prior commitments involving her role in Joker: Folie à Deux. On the morning of the ceremony, however, it was reported that Gaga would perform at the ceremony. Meanwhile, actress Glenn Close, who was originally scheduled as a presenter during the gala, canceled her appearance due to a positive COVID-19 test.

=== Box office performance of Best Picture nominees ===
When the nominations were announced, nine of the ten films nominated for Best Picture had earned a combined gross of $1.57 billion at the American and Canadian box offices at the time. Top Gun: Maverick was the highest-grossing film among the Best Picture nominees with $718.7 million in domestic box office receipts. Avatar: The Way of Water came in second with $598.4 million; this was followed by Elvis ($151 million), Everything Everywhere All at Once ($70 million), The Fabelmans ($15 million), The Banshees of Inisherin ($9 million), Tar ($5.6 million), Triangle of Sadness ($4.2 million), and Women Talking ($1.1 million). The box office figures for All Quiet on the Western Front were unavailable due to their distributor Netflix's policy of refusing to release such figures. Furthermore, by virtue of Avatar: The Way of Water and Top Gun: Maverick's Best Picture nominations, it marked the first time since the 55th ceremony in 1983 that the two highest grossing films of the year were both nominated in the aforementioned category.

=== Andrea Riseborough's nomination and controversy ===
Andrea Riseborough's Best Actress nomination for To Leslie was controversial amongst critics and pundits, as Momentum Pictures, the film's distributor, did not fund a conventional advertising-driven awards campaign for the film. Instead, director Michael Morris and his wife, actress Mary McCormack, organized a "celeb-backed campaign" to get Riseborough nominated. They contacted friends and colleagues in the entertainment industry, asking them to view the film and share it with others if they enjoyed it. Morris and Riseborough also hired publicists to coordinate the efforts. While not initially regarded as a serious contender, the campaign raised Riseborough's profile; dozens of celebrities praised her performance on social media, and some hosted screenings of the film during voting for the Academy Award nominations in January 2023. Riseborough's nomination was announced on January 24, which the Los Angeles Times called "one of the most shocking nominations in Oscar history".

After her nomination was announced, speculation arose that the tactics might have violated AMPAS rules against directly lobbying voters. A post on the film's Instagram account was noted by several AMPAS members for possibly violating a rule prohibiting "[singling] out 'the competition' by name" by featuring a quote from film critic Richard Roeper, who praised Riseborough's performance as better than Cate Blanchett's in Tár, a fellow nominee for Best Actress. On January 27, the Academy announced a review of the year's campaigns "to ensure that no guidelines were violated, and to inform us whether changes to the guidelines may be needed in a new era of social media and digital communication".

The Academy has rescinded nominations for nominees who participated in unsanctioned campaigning. However, there were no reports that Riseborough had been involved in such, or that any Academy members had lodged formal complaints about the campaign's behavior. On January 31, the Academy concluded its review by pledging to address "social media and outreach campaigning tactics" which they said caused "concern", but confirming that Riseborough's nomination would be retained. Following the controversy, the Academy introduced new campaigning rules and clarifications in May 2023.

=== Critical reviews ===
Variety columnist Owen Gleiberman wrote: "It didn't rock the boat, it didn't overstay its welcome, and it left you feeling that the world's preeminent awards show, all doom-saying punditry to the contrary, is still, on balance, a very good thing." He also added that the wins received by Everything Everywhere All at Once "lent the evening a rare emotional unity". Television critic Daniel Fienberg of The Hollywood Reporter similarly praised the show's emotional beats and found its flaws "were mitigated more gracefully than just about any Oscars telecast" he could recall. Mick LaSalle of the San Francisco Chronicle commended Kimmel's stint as host stating: "He was establishing that 2023 would not be a repeat of 2022 — and it wasn't. It was such a relief to see something, anything, actually get better."

Mike Hale of The New York Times remarked on "the ordinariness and sameness of the ABC broadcast" compared to the prior year, while USA Today's Kelly Lawler criticized it as "terribly fake" and felt that Kimmel's role "felt phoned in, or at least maybe monitored by corporate overlords looking to avoid controversy" despite some of his jokes tackling controversial subjects such as the January 6 United States Capitol attack and Tom Cruise's Scientology advocacy. Hale added that "the modern Oscars have become something more to be endured than enjoyed".

=== Ratings and reception ===
The American telecast on ABC drew in an average of 18.75 million people over its length, which was a 13% increase from the previous year's ceremony and marked the first time that the Academy Awards experienced consecutive years of viewership increase since the 86th Academy Awards in 2014. The show also earned higher Nielsen ratings compared to the previous ceremony with 9.9% of households watching the ceremony. In addition, it garnered a higher 18–49 demo rating with a 4.43 rating among viewers in that demographic. It was the 15th most-watched prime time broadcast of 2023 in the United States, behind only sport events. In July 2023, the broadcast was nominated for four awards at the 75th Primetime Creative Arts Emmys but failed to win in any of the categories for which it was nominated.

== "In Memoriam" ==
The annual "In Memoriam" segment was introduced by John Travolta. Singer Lenny Kravitz performed his song "Calling All Angels" during the tribute.

- Olivia Newton-John – singer, actress
- John Korty – director, producer
- May Routh – costume designer
- Louise Fletcher – actress
- John Zaritsky – cinematographer
- Albert Brenner – production designer
- Irene Papas – actress
- Mitchell Goldman – executive
- Bob Rafelson – director, writer, producer
- Albert Saiki – design engineer
- Ian Whittaker – set decorator
- Robbie Coltrane – actor
- Kirstie Alley – actress
- Ray Liotta – actor
- Vicky Eguia – publicity executive
- Angelo Badalamenti – composer
- Greg Jein – visual effects artist, model maker
- Neal Jimenez – writer, director
- Mike Hill – film editor
- Tom Luddy – producer, film festival co-founder
- Marina Goldovskaya – director, cinematographer, educator
- Christopher Tucker – special effects makeup artist
- Irene Cara – actress, singer, songwriter
- Gregory Allen Howard – writer, producer
- Owen Roizman – cinematographer
- Luster Bayless – costume designer
- Gray Frederickson – producer
- Robert Dalva – film editor
- Nichelle Nichols – actress
- Edward R. Pressman – producer
- Douglas McGrath – writer, director, actor
- Julia Reichert – producer, director
- Edie Landau – producer, executive
- Mike Moder – assistant director, producer
- Jean-Luc Godard – director, writer
- Ralph Eggleston – animator, production designer
- Marvin March – set decorator
- Burt Bacharach – composer
- Nick Bosustow – producer
- Clayton Pinney – special effects artist
- Simone Bär – casting director
- Donn Cambern – film editor
- Tom Whitlock – songwriter
- Amanda Mackey – casting director
- Angela Lansbury – actress
- Wolfgang Petersen – director, writer, producer
- John Dartigue – publicity executive
- Burny Mattinson – animator
- Maurizio Silvi – makeup artist
- Jacques Perrin – actor, producer, director
- Mary Alice – actress
- Gina Lollobrigida – actress
- Carl Bell – animator
- Douglas Kirkland – photographer
- Vangelis – composer, musician
- James Caan – actor, producer
- Raquel Welch – actress
- Walter Mirisch – producer, former President of the Academy

== See also ==
- List of submissions to the 95th Academy Awards for Best International Feature Film
