= It Is Time for a Love Revolution =

Studio album by Lenny Kravitz
- Released: February 5, 2008
- Recorded: 2006–2007
- Genre: Rock
- Length: 62:09
- Label: Virgin
- Producer: Lenny Kravitz

Lenny Kravitz chronology
Baptism (2004)	It Is Time for a Love Revolution (2008)	Black and White America (2011)

Singles from It Is Time for a Love Revolution
- 1. "Bring It On" Released: October 25, 2007; 2. "I'll Be Waiting" Released: December 6, 2007; 3. "Love Love Love" Released: February 17, 2008; 4. "Dancin' Til Dawn" Released: November 25, 2008

Professional ratings
Aggregate scores
Source	Rating
Metacritic	57/100
Review scores
Source	Rating
AllMusic	4/5 stars
The A.V. Club	C−
Entertainment Weekly	B
The Guardian	3/5 stars
Mojo	2/5 stars
Now	4/5 stars
Q	2/5 stars
Record Collector	2/5 stars
Rolling Stone	3/5 stars
Spin	3.5/5 stars

It Is Time for a Love Revolution is the eighth studio album by American rock musician Lenny Kravitz, released on February 5, 2008. The album produced four singles released in 2007 and 2008. This is Kravitz's final album for Virgin Records.

== Background ==
It includes 14 original tracks, written, composed, arranged, performed, and produced by Kravitz. The album received Kravitz's best reviews in years, with Rolling Stone giving it three stars out of a possible five and suggesting that "As a blast back to the past, this is the best album Lenny Kravitz has ever made."

Kravitz toured with the album's material for two years after the release, starting with a performance of two new songs on Times Square New Year's Eve show, hosted by Carson Daly.

== Release ==
It debuted at No. 4 on the Billboard 200, selling about 73,000 copies in its first week and becoming Kravitz's first US Top 5 album since 2000's Greatest Hits.

== Reception ==
At Metacritic, which assigns a weighted mean rating out of 100 to reviews from mainstream critics, the album received an average score of 57, based on 17 reviews, which indicates "mixed or average reviews".

Michaelangelo Matos of The A.V. Club stated "Well, there go the rumors that with each album, Lenny Kravitz was going to jump ahead three years stylistically, catching up with the present some time around 2008. From its title on down, It Is Time For A Love Revolution is spiritually interchangeable with his debut, 1989's Let Love Rule". Stephen Thomas Erlewine of AllMusic wrote "...by the measure of pure sound, It Is Time for a Love Revolution is a glorious feast of retro-rock pleasures – a feast of empty calories perhaps, but sometimes fast food is more irresistible than a five-course meal". Betty Clarke of The Guardian wrote "having given up sex in a quest to find a wife, renowned lothario Lenny Kravitz has directed all his extra energy into getting back to his best. His eighth album is another collection of vintage riffs, funky rhythms and hippy-dippy sentiments but like an abstinence-propelled prize fighter, Kravitz sounds leaner and hungrier than for years... Ultimately bogged down by spirituality, guitar solos and soppy ballads, this comeback should nonetheless win Kravitz a few hearts, even if he doesn't discover a soulmate".

Leah Greenblatt of Entertainment Weekly commented "His infamous mane may be shorn but the songs on It Is Time for a Love Revolution remain the same: guitar-heavy, psychedelic-swirly, and determinedly flower-powered". Chad Grinshaw of IGN stated "It Is Time for a Love Revolution is a half-hearted return to Kravitz's bluesy-rock roots. There are glimpses of the rocker he used to be but too much of the album is nothing more than the same bland adult contemporary fodder he has been dishing out lately, dressed up with slightly cranked up guitar". A reviewer of Daily Express said "Energetic, youthful and without the cynical by-numbers feel of his recent albums, this feels like a fiery return to form". Terry Staunton of Record Collector wrote "Lenny's got a new album out, it's painfully similar to all his others and nowhere near as good as the records he listens to". David Fricke of Rolling Stone stated "As a blast back to the past, this is the best album Lenny Kravitz has ever made – a visceral, expertly tailored blend of late-Sixties and early-Seventies classic-rock paraphrases with just enough modernizing to justify the record's copyright date".

== Track listing ==
All lyrics are written by Lenny Kravitz, except for "Love Revolution", by Kravitz and Craig Ross.

Original LP
No.	Title	Music	Length
1.	"Love Revolution"	Lenny Kravitz, Craig Ross	3:14
2.	"Bring It On"	Lenny Kravitz	3:35
3.	"Good Morning"	Lenny Kravitz, Tony LeMans	4:17
4.	"Love Love Love"	Lenny Kravitz, Craig Ross	3:21
5.	"If You Want It"	Lenny Kravitz, Craig Ross	5:08
6.	"I'll Be Waiting"	Lenny Kravitz, Craig Ross	4:19
7.	"Will You Marry Me"	Lenny Kravitz, Craig Ross	3:43
8.	"I Love the Rain"	Lenny Kravitz	4:43
9.	"A Long and Sad Goodbye"	Lenny Kravitz, Craig Ross	5:58
10.	"Dancin' Til Dawn"	Lenny Kravitz, Craig Ross	5:09
11.	"This Moment Is All There Is"	Lenny Kravitz	5:07
12.	"A New Door"	Lenny Kravitz	4:38
13.	"Back in Vietnam"	Lenny Kravitz	3:45
14.	"I Want to Go Home"	Lenny Kravitz	5:04
Total length:			62:09

Japan deluxe edition
No.	Title	Music	Length
15.	"Uncharted Terrain"	Lenny Kravitz	4:28
16.	"Confused"	Lenny Kravitz	6:48
17.	"I'll Be Waiting" (acoustic version)	Lenny Kravitz, Craig Ross	4:22
Total length:			77:48

=== Deluxe edition bonus DVD ===
1. "It Is Time for a Love Revolution Intro" (Interview)
2. "Let Love Rule" (5.1 Surround Video) (originally on Let Love Rule)
3. "Mr. Cab Driver" (originally on Let Love Rule)
4. "I'll Be Waiting" (Interview)
5. "It Ain't Over 'Til It's Over" (originally on Mama Said)
6. "Are You Gonna Go My Way" (originally on Are You Gonna Go My Way)
7. "If You Want It" (Interview)
8. "Rock and Roll Is Dead" (5.1 Surround Video) (originally on Circus)
9. "A Long and Sad Goodbye" (Interview)
10. "Fly Away" (originally on 5)
11. "Lady" (originally on Baptism)
12. "Love Revolution" (Interview)
13. "Where Are We Runnin'?" (originally on Baptism)

== Personnel ==
Musicians

- Lenny Kravitz – lead vocals, background vocals (tracks 1–10, 12–14), electric guitar (tracks 1, 3, 5, 6, 8, 10, 11, 13, 14), electric guitar solo (track 7), bass (tracks 1–11, 13, 14), drums (tracks 1–11, 13, 14), piano (tracks 6, 12), Mellotron (tracks 4, 8), Wurlitzer electric piano (track 3), Moog (track 4), synthesizer (track 7), harpsichord (track 11), Hammond B-3 organ (track 14), harmonica (track 2), tambourine and handclaps (track 1), congas and cowbell (track 7), finger snaps (track 11), orchestral arrangement (tracks 3, 5, 6, 9), string arrangement (track 12)
- Craig Ross – electric guitar (tracks 1–4, 7, 9), acoustic guitar (tracks 5, 8, 12, 13), mandolin (track 13), handclaps (track 1), orchestral arrangement (track 6)
- Darrett Adkins – cello (tracks 3, 5, 6, 9)
- Tawatha Agee – background vocals (track 5)
- Michael Block – cello (track 5)
- David Bowlin – violin (tracks 5, 6)
- Tony Breit – bass (track 12)
- Kenji Bunch – viola (tracks 3, 5, 9)
- Robert Carlisle – French horn (track 5)
- Cornelius Dufallo – violin (tracks 3, 9)
- Edison String Group – strings (track 12)
- Chris Gross – cello (track 5)
- Amy Kauffman – violin (track 5)
- Alexandra Knoll – oboe (track 6)
- Katie Kresek – violin (track 5)
- Conway Kuo – violin (tracks 5, 6)
- Elizabeth Lim-Dutton – violin (track 5)
- Kurt Nikkanen – violin (track 5)
- Lenny Pickett – saxophone (track 10)
- Stewart Rose – French horn (track 5)
- Dov Scheindlin – viola (track 6)
- Anoushka Shankar – sitar (track 2)
- Antoine Silverman – violin (track 5)
- Liuh-Wen Ting – viola (track 5)

Production

- Lenny Kravitz – producer, mixing
- Henry Hirsch – engineer, mixing
- Cyrille Taillandier, Chris Theis, Tony Lowe, Cal Harris Jr. – assistant engineers
- Alex Alvarez – guitar and bass engineer (track 3)
- Ted Jensen – mastering

== Charts ==
=== Weekly charts ===
Weekly chart performance for It Is Time for a Love Revolution
Chart	Peak position
Australian Albums (ARIA)	47
Austrian Albums (Ö3 Austria)	2
Belgian Albums (Ultratop Flanders)	4
Belgian Albums (Ultratop Wallonia)	9
Canadian Albums (Billboard)	5
Danish Albums (Hitlisten)	17
Dutch Albums (Album Top 100)	2
Finnish Albums (Suomen virallinen lista)	9
French Albums (SNEP)	5
German Albums (Offizielle Top 100)	3
Greek Albums Chart	14
Hungarian Albums Chart	16
Italian Albums (FIMI)	3
Japanese Albums (Oricon)	10
Mexican Albums Chart	38
New Zealand Albums (RMNZ)	30
Norwegian Albums (VG-lista)	28
Polish Albums Chart	2
Portuguese Albums (AFP)	11
Scottish Albums (Official Charts)	49
Spanish Albums (Promusicae)	6
Swedish Albums (Sverigetopplistan)	17
Swiss Albums (Schweizer Hitparade)	1
UK Albums (Official Charts)	42
US Billboard 200	4

=== Year-end charts ===
Year-end chart performance for It Is Time for a Love Revolution
Chart (2008)	Position
Germany	44

== Certifications and sales ==
Certifications and sales for It Is Time for a Love Revolution
Region	Certification	Certified units/sales
Austria (IFPI Austria)	Platinum	20,000^{*}
France (SNEP)	Platinum	100,000^{*}
Germany (BVMI)	Gold	100,000^{^}
Russia (NFPF)	Gold	10,000^{*}
Switzerland (IFPI Switzerland)	Gold	15,000^{^}
United States	—	240,000
^{*} Sales figures based on certification alone.^{^} Shipments figures based on certification alone.
