= Let Love Rule =

Let Love Rule may refer to:

- Let Love Rule (Archie Roach album) or the title song, 2016
- Let Love Rule (Ledisi album) or the title song, 2017
- Let Love Rule (Lenny Kravitz album), 1989
  - "Let Love Rule" (song), the title song
- Let Love Rule, a reality dating show format developed by ITV Studios, broadcast in the UK as The Cabins
