= California (Lenny Kravitz song) =

2004 single by Lenny Kravitz

Single by Lenny Kravitz

from the album Baptism
- Released: July 12, 2004
- Length: 2:36
- Label: Virgin
- Songwriter: Lenny Kravitz
- Producer: Lenny Kravitz

Lenny Kravitz singles chronology
"Storm" (2004)	"California" (2004)	"Lady" (2004)

"California" is a song written, produced, and performed by American singer Lenny Kravitz, released as the second single from his seventh studio album, Baptism (2004), on July 12, 2004. Kravitz plays all the instruments on the song and uses his own handclaps. The song reached number 28 in Italy and charted moderately in several other European countries. It was released in the United States as a radio single and maxi-single but did not appear on any Billboard charts.

== Track listings ==
US maxi-CD single

1. "California"
2. "Mr. Cab Driver" (acoustic)

UK 7-inch orange vinyl

1. "California"
2. "Mr. Cab Driver" (live from Sessions@AOL)

UK CD single

1. "California" – 2:37
2. "Where Are We Runnin'?" (live at WXRK, New York City) – 3:40

European and Australasian maxi-CD single

1. "California" – 2:37
2. "Mr. Cab Driver" (live from Sessions@AOL) – 4:00
3. "Where Are We Runnin'?" (live at WXRK, New York City) – 3:40

== Charts ==
Chart (2004)	Peak position
Austria (Ö3 Austria Top 40)	56
Italy (FIMI)	28
Netherlands (Dutch Top 40)	38
Netherlands (Single Top 100)	64
Switzerland (Schweizer Hitparade)	57
Scotland Singles (OCC)	81
UK Singles (OCC)	62

== Release history ==
Region	Date	Format(s)	Label(s)	Ref.
United Kingdom	July 12, 2004	CD	Virgin	
United States	July 26, 2004	Hot AC; mainstream rock; triple A radio	Virgin	
Australia	August 30, 2004	CD	Virgin	
