= Baptism (Lenny Kravitz album) =

Studio album by Lenny Kravitz
- Released: May 17, 2004
- Recorded: 2003–2004
- Studio: Hotel Edison Studios, Miami, Florida, US
- Length: 54:00
- Label: Virgin
- Producer: Lenny Kravitz

Lenny Kravitz chronology
Lenny (2001)	Baptism (2004)	It Is Time for a Love Revolution (2008)

Singles from Baptism
- 1. "Where Are We Runnin'?" Released: April 5, 2004; 2. "Storm" Released: July 6, 2004; 3. "California" Released: July 12, 2004; 4. "Lady" Released: August 30, 2004; 5. "Calling All Angels" Released: November 15, 2004

Baptism is the seventh studio album by American rock musician Lenny Kravitz, released on May 17, 2004, by Virgin Records. The album produced five singles and reached number 14 on the Billboard 200 and number 74 on the UK Albums Chart.

== Production ==
Lenny Kravitz originally intended this album to be a 1970s style funk album, simply titled The Funk Album. However, he changed his mind when he picked up an acoustic guitar to write the songs for the album. Having stated that songs started pouring out of him, Kravitz decided that his special project could wait. Instead, Kravitz recorded a more straightforward rock album similar to his 1989 album Let Love Rule. The album was recorded at Hotel Edison studios in Miami, Florida, and also features a contribution from rapper Jay-Z on the song "Storm". "Storm" was originally titled "(I Can't Make It) Another Day" and was originally recorded with Michael Jackson. Kravitz had previously played guitar on Jay-Z's album The Blueprint²: The Gift & the Curse. Kravitz had mentioned in an interview that at the time of the album's production, he was in dispute with his record label, who did not agree with his decisions to alter his project, saying that the album featured some darker material representing his stage of depression and other problems he was going through at that time.

== Promotion ==
For the promotion of the album, Kravitz kicked off the Baptism tour in April of that year across North America. In 2005, Kravitz embarked on yet another tour called The Electric Church Tour: One Night Only in select cities. Kravitz also had a prominent role in the Gap campaign of 2004–2005 as he modelled for the brand and his image was used in stores across North America as a major celebrity seal. Kravitz's single "Lady" was used very heavily in the company's "How Do You Wear It?" campaign and also filmed two commercials with Gap spokesmodel Sarah Jessica Parker playing the song to and dancing with Parker.

== Reception ==
Professional ratings
Aggregate scores
Source	Rating
Metacritic	43/100
Review scores
Source	Rating
AllMusic	1.5/5 stars
Blender	1.5/5 stars
Encyclopedia of Popular Music	3/5 stars
E!	C−
Entertainment Weekly	C
Mojo	1/5 stars
Now	2/5 stars
Q	3/5 stars
Rolling Stone	3/5 stars
Slant Magazine	1/5 stars

Initial critical response to Baptism ranged from average to negative. At Metacritic, which assigns a normalized rating out of 100 to reviews from mainstream critics, the album has received an average score of 43, based on 10 reviews.

Sal Cinquemani of Slant Magazine wrote "His highly stylized brand of retro rock has always been a guilty pleasure, even though it's been largely hit or miss, but with Baptism, Kravitz's seventh album, it's become sad and limp, like a wet, leftover noodle or a stash gone bad. He should just do a cover album and be done with it". Stephen Thomas Erlewine of AllMusic wrote "While these are fine individual moments, they wind up being a bit dispiriting since they're surrounded by lazy, exhausted retreads where it sounds as if the act of making music is a chore to Kravitz—something that he nearly admits in his lyrics. It's a shame and embarrassment, and hopefully it will be a temporary slump like Circus—unless he really does want to quit this business called show, since it would be better for him to stop making records than to crank out depressing sludge like this."

Ryan Lenz of Today added "Some have speculated that Kravitz is intent on cementing a place in the Rock and Roll Hall of Fame. For the fans, Baptism seems more intent on giving them something to worship." Kevin Forest Moreau of ShakingThrough.net wrote "Lenny Kravitz became a star by peddling familiar wares in a flashy package: If there was always an element of "Been there, heard that" in his rock, soul and funk classicism, Kravitz's craftsmanship and charisma were usually enough to carry the day. But those elements are critically missing from Baptism." Caroline Bansal of musicOMH added "The production is in fact what lets this album down. The mix is all wrong, with the drums far too high and the guitars way too low."

== Track listing ==
Baptism track listing
No.	Title	Writer(s)	Length
1.	"Minister of Rock 'n Roll"	Lenny Kravitz; Craig Ross	3:34
2.	"I Don't Want to Be a Star"	Kravitz	4:25
3.	"Lady"	Kravitz; Ross	4:15
4.	"Calling All Angels"	Kravitz	5:12
5.	"California"	Kravitz	2:36
6.	"Sistamamalover"	Kravitz	4:29
7.	"Where Are We Runnin'?"	Kravitz; Ross	2:41
8.	"Baptized"	Terry Britten; Gerry DeVeaux; Kravitz	4:48
9.	"Flash"	Kravitz	4:12
10.	"What Did I Do with My Life?"	Kravitz	4:04
11.	"Storm" (featuring Jay-Z)	Kravitz; Shawn Carter	3:58
12.	"The Other Side"	Kravitz	4:50
13.	"Destiny"	Kravitz; Lionel Richie	4:55
Total length:			54:00

Japanese edition bonus track
No.	Title	Writer(s)	Length
14.	"Uncharted Terrain"	Kravitz	3:34
Total length:			57:34

== Personnel ==
Musicians

- Lenny Kravitz – vocals, electric guitar (tracks 1–3, 5–13), acoustic guitar (tracks 1, 2, 5, 6, 8, 10, 13), guitar solo (tracks 3, 6, 7), bass guitar (tracks 1, 2, 4–12), drums (tracks 1, 2, 4–6, 8–12), piano (tracks 1, 2, 4–6, 10, 11), hand claps (tracks 5, 8, 12), Moog synthesizer and Mellotron (track 1), timpani (track 4), Hammond organ and wood block (track 11), synthesizer (track 12), string arrangement (tracks 4, 10, 11)
- Tawatha Agee – background vocals (track 8)
- Tyra Alston – handclaps (track 8)
- David Baron – baritone saxophone (track 3), string arrangement (track 4)
- Henry Hirsch – bass guitar (track 3), piano (track 7)
- Jay-Z – rap (track 11)
- Denine LaBat – handclaps (track 8)
- Norma Rodgers – handclaps (track 8)
- Craig Ross – electric guitar (tracks 3, 6, 7, 10, 12), guitar solo (track 9), drums (tracks 3, 7), piano (track 3), tambourine (track 7)
- David Sanborn – saxophone (tracks 9, 10, 12)
- The Uncle Clappers (Uncle Bruce, Uncle Hans, Uncle Craig) – handclaps (track 6)
- David Whyko – handclaps (track 8)

Production

- Lenny Kravitz – producer, mixing
- Henry Hirsch – engineer, mixing
- Cyrille Taillandier – assistant engineer, Pro Tools engineer
- Ted Jensen – mastering

== Charts ==
=== Weekly charts ===
Weekly chart performance for Baptism
Chart (2004)	Peak position
Australian Albums (ARIA)	42
Austrian Albums (Ö3 Austria)	4
Belgian Albums (Ultratop Flanders)	8
Belgian Albums (Ultratop Wallonia)	16
Danish Albums (Hitlisten)	10
Dutch Albums (Album Top 100)	3
Finnish Albums (Suomen virallinen lista)	8
French Albums (SNEP)	8
German Albums (Offizielle Top 100)	2
Hungarian Albums (MAHASZ)	35
Italian Albums (FIMI)	5
Japanese Albums (Oricon)	7
Norwegian Albums (VG-lista)	17
Portuguese Albums (AFP)	7
Scottish Albums (OCC)	85
Spanish Albums (AFYVE)	5
Swedish Albums (Sverigetopplistan)	13
Swiss Albums (Schweizer Hitparade)	3
UK Albums (OCC)	74
US Billboard 200	14

=== Year-end charts ===
Year-end chart performance for Baptism
Chart (2004)	Position
Austrian Albums (Ö3 Austria)	38
Belgian Albums (Ultratop Flanders)	88
Dutch Albums (Album Top 100)	56
German Albums (Offizielle Top 100)	60
Italian Albums (FIMI)	66
Swiss Albums (Schweizer Hitparade)	26

== Certifications and sales ==
Certifications and sales for Baptism
Region	Certification	Certified units/sales
Argentina (CAPIF)	Gold	20,000^{^}
Austria (IFPI Austria)	Platinum	30,000^{*}
Canada (Music Canada)	Gold	50,000^{^}
Germany (BVMI)	Gold	100,000^{^}
Portugal (AFP)	Silver	10,000^{^}
Switzerland (IFPI Switzerland)	Gold	20,000^{^}
United States (RIAA)	Gold	551,000
^{*} Sales figures based on certification alone.^{^} Shipments figures based on certification alone.
