= Calling All Angels =

Calling All Angels may refer to:

- "Calling All Angels" (Train song), 2003
- "Calling All Angels" (Jane Siberry song), 1991
- "Calling All Angels" (Lenny Kravitz song), 2004
