= I Build This Garden for Us =

Single by Lenny Kravitz

from the album Let Love Rule
- Released: January 18, 1990
- Recorded: 1989
- Genre: Psychedelic rock
- Length: 6:16 (album version); 4:40 (single version)
- Label: Virgin
- Songwriter: Lenny Kravitz
- Producer: Lenny Kravitz

Lenny Kravitz singles chronology
"Let Love Rule" (1989)	"I Build This Garden for Us" (1990)	"Mr. Cab Driver" (1990)

"I Build This Garden for Us" is a song by American rock musician Lenny Kravitz, released in 1990 by Virgin Records as the second single from his debut album, Let Love Rule (1989).

== Critical reception ==
In a review on 3 February 1990, Simon Reynolds of Melody Maker named the musician a "hi-fibre, organic version of Prince" and summarized on a single, "Well made, but not what you could call 'music'". John Mackie from The Vancouver Sun declared it a "standout" from Let Love Rule, noting that the song "sounds like it was teleported in from the golden era of psychedelia".

== Track listing ==
1. "I Build This Garden for Us" – 6:16 (Kravitz)
2. "Flower Child" – 2:56 (Kravitz)
3. "Fear" – 5:25 (Kravitz, Lisa Bonet)

== Personnel ==
- Lenny Kravitz – vocals, guitar, drums
- Jean McClain – backing vocals
- Yolanda Pittman – backing vocals
- Tisha Campbell – backing vocals
- Nancy Ives – cello
- Henry Hirsch – bass, organ, electric piano (Rhodes piano)
- Eric Delente – violin

== Charts ==
Chart performance for "I Build This Garden for Us"
Chart (1990)	Peak position
Australia (ARIA)	83
Netherlands (Single Top 100)	51
UK Singles (OCC)	83
US Alternative Airplay (Billboard)	25
