= The Red Suitcase =

2022 short film

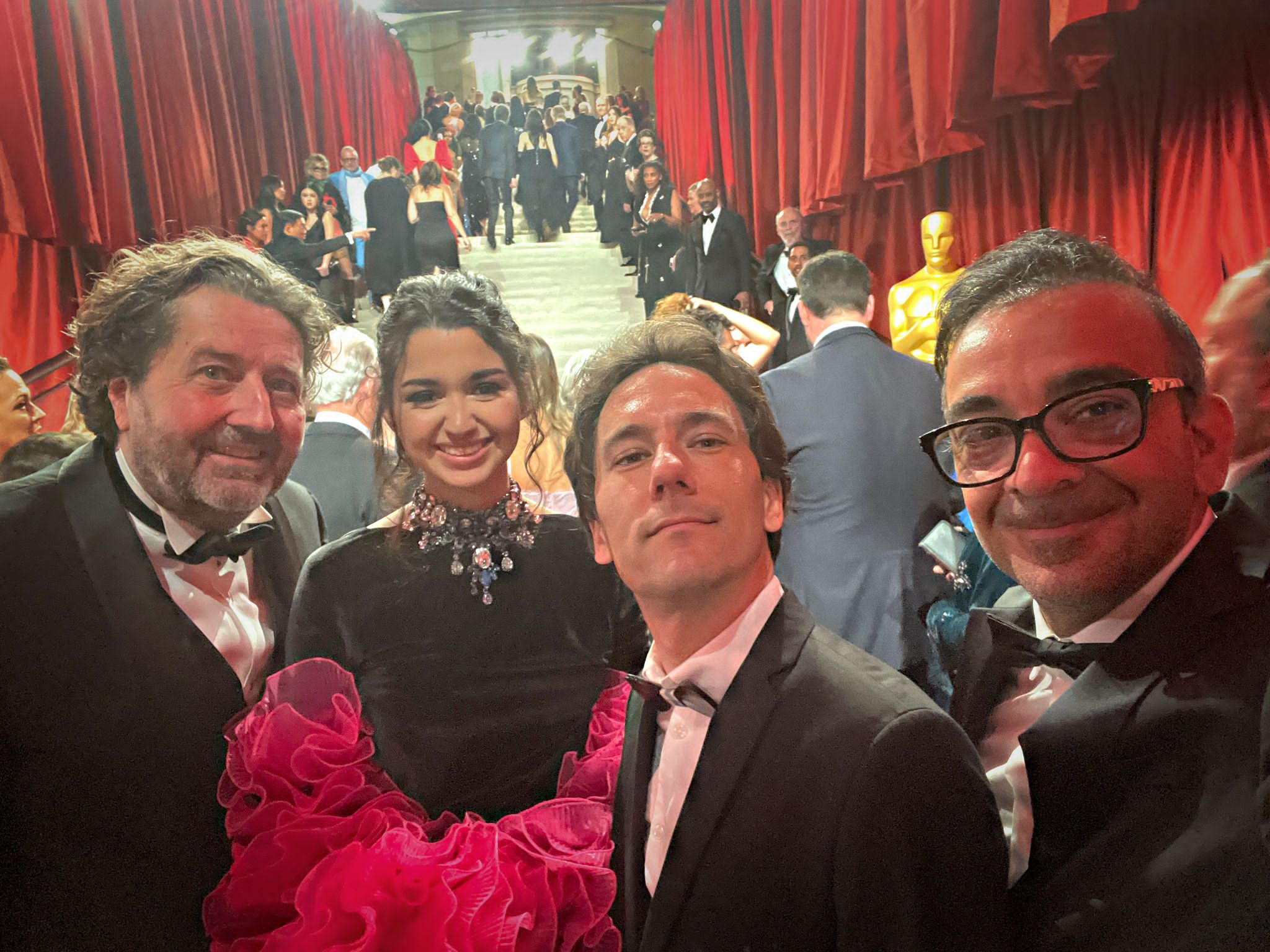
The "Red Suitcase" team at Oscars 2023

The Red Suitcase (French: La Valise rouge) is a 2022 short film directed by Cyrus Neshvad.

== Accolades ==
The film was nominated for the 2023 Academy Award for Best Live Action Short Film.

== Summary ==
Ariane, a 16-year-old Muslim girl with a talent for art, arrives at the Luxembourg airport from Iran, but is reluctant to leave the baggage claim. It was revealed that her father arranged her marriage to a much older man, who will be picking her up to take to their wedding ceremony. Ariane, terrified at the prospect, removes her hijab in the bathroom in order to sneak past the oblivious man, who begins to search for her in the terminal. Ariane exchanges her money for Euros and throws away the envelope of money from her father. She hides from her fiancé, who grows increasingly upset at Ariane's disappearance. However, when he discovers the envelope in the garbage, he realizes that she is nearby. Ariane hurries to a nearby bus in order to escape, losing most of her money in the process, but after an oblivious worker reveals to her fiancé that she is on the bus, he storms on board to search for her. Ariane escapes outside and hides in the luggage compartment. The fiancé does not notice her, but finds and takes her suitcase, which includes all of her artwork and supplies. A devastated Ariane watches him leave before reading a text message from her father begging her to come home. Ariane turns off her phone and waits in the luggage compartment as the bus departs.

== Cast ==
- Nawelle Ewad as Adiane
- Sarkaw Gorany as Man
- Céline Camara as Counter Woman
- Anne Klein as Customs Officer
- Jerome Funk as Customs Officer
- Denis Jousselin as Bus Driver
- Oscar Martin as Security

== Production ==
The film was shot is 6 days at the Luxembourg airport being produced and directed by Cyrus Neshvad. In an interview with No Film School, Neshvad claims to have developed the idea for The Red Suitcase after talking with his Iranian mother about her hearings of disappearing women in Iran.
