= Love Love Love (Lenny Kravitz song) =

Single by Lenny Kravitz

from the album It Is Time for a Love Revolution
- Released: February 2008
- Length: 3:21
- Label: Virgin
- Songwriters: Lenny Kravitz; Craig Ross
- Producer: Lenny Kravitz

Lenny Kravitz singles chronology
"I'll Be Waiting" (2007)	"Love Love Love" (2008)	"Dancin' Til Dawn" (2008)

"Love Love Love" is the second single written by rock singer Lenny Kravitz and Craig Ross for Kravitz's eighth studio album, It Is Time for a Love Revolution (2008). The domestic version of the video premiered on MTV's TRL on June 3, 2008.

== Chart performance ==
Chart (2008)	Peak position
Germany	92
Dutch Mega Top 50	25
