= (I Can't Make It) Another Day =

2010 song by Michael Jackson featuring Lenny Kravitz

Song by Michael Jackson featuring Lenny Kravitz

from the album Michael
- Released: December 10, 2010
- Recorded: 1999–2001 (original); 2010 (additional mixes and overdubs)
- Studio: Marvin's Room (Los Angeles)
- Genre: Pop rock; R&B; funk rock; industrial rock
- Length: 3:55
- Label: Epic
- Songwriter: Lenny Kravitz
- Producers: Lenny Kravitz; Michael Jackson (co-producer)

"Storm"

Single by Lenny Kravitz featuring Jay-Z

from the album Baptism
- Released: July 6, 2004
- Genre: Rap rock; funk rock
- Length: 3:58
- Label: Virgin
- Songwriters: Lenny Kravitz; Shawn Carter
- Producer: Lenny Kravitz

Lenny Kravitz singles chronology
| "Where Are We Runnin'?" (2004) | "Storm" (2004) | "California" (2004) |

Jay-Z singles chronology
| "99 Problems" (2004) | "Storm" (2004) | "Big Chips" (2004) |

"(I Can't Make It) Another Day" is a song by American singer, songwriter and recording artist Michael Jackson featuring Lenny Kravitz, released on the posthumous album Michael. Initially leaked as a 90-second snippet, it was referred to as "Another Day". Shortly after the leak, singer-songwriter Lenny Kravitz confirmed that he had produced and composed "Another Day"; he stated that although he did not leak the song, he would like to have the full version of the song—in which he also features—officially released. Kravitz later referred to the song as "(I Can't Make It) Another Day" on Facebook prior to the release of the Michael album. The song was recorded for the album Invincible, but dropped from the final track list. It was later re-written and re-titled "Storm", a collaboration between Kravitz and rapper Jay-Z which is featured on the former's 2004 album Baptism and was released as the album's second single on July 6, 2004, as well as peaking at number 98 in the United States.

Shortly after the leak, both Jackson's estate and record label, Sony Music Entertainment, revealed that they were in the process of removing "Another Day" from the Internet for copyright reasons. Despite successful attempts, the song has continued to be re-uploaded to the Internet and listened to thousands of times. "Another Day" is the second Jackson track to be posthumously leaked, as it follows "A Place with No Name", which was unofficially released on July 16, 2009.

== Background ==
In June 2009, singer Michael Jackson died at the age of 50 following cardiac arrest. Three weeks after Jackson's death, celebrity news website TMZ.com (who were the first media outlet to report his death) obtained a 24-second snippet of a song entitled "A Place with No Name", and released it on the Internet. At the time of the leak there were news reports that there was a "vast vault" and "dozens and dozens" of unreleased Jackson songs that could be issued for several years to come. The curator of the Rock and Roll Hall of Fame, Jim Henke, commented that any future Jackson releases would receive a significant amount of attention, stating, "What we have seen happen in the last three weeks is that the albums that are out here right now are selling in amazing numbers. I think we are going to see amazing interest in any released Michael Jackson material that will come out in the future or a year from now on."

After Jackson's death, rock musician Lenny Kravitz wrote a letter about the late singer that was published by AOL Music's website Spinner.com. In it he spoke of collaborating with Jackson on an unspecified song: "I got to work with Michael on a track that has not been released and it was the most amazing experience I've had in the studio. He was funny. Very funny and we laughed the whole time." Kravitz added, "He was a beautiful human being."

On December 10, 2010, the song was officially released on the posthumous album Michael. It features more vocals and instrumentation.

== Leak and music ==
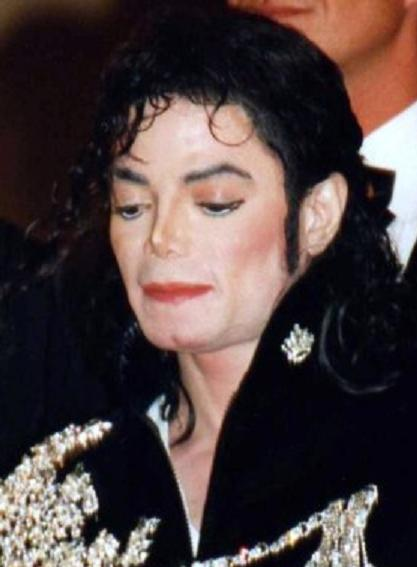
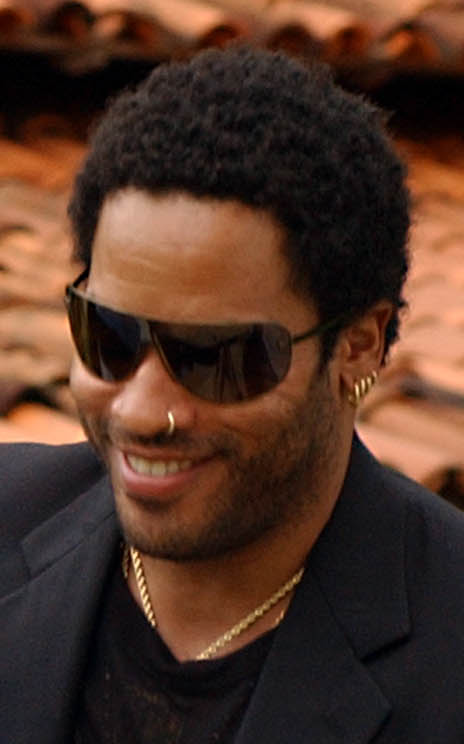
Michael Jackson recorded "Another Day", a song written, produced and composed by Lenny Kravitz, who also appears on the track.

A 90-second snippet of a song called "Another Day" was leaked onto the Internet on January 2, 2010. It features the vocals of Michael Jackson and Winnipeg Free Press stated the song originated from TMZ.com. At the beginning of the leaked snippet, two DJs, one calling himself Kels, are name-checked. The full song is said to feature both Jackson and Kravitz, with the Huffington Post insisting that while the latter does not appear on the snippet of "Another Day", the song is a duet between the two musicians.

Gil Kaufman of MTV spoke of the snippet's composition, proclaiming that it had a "thumping R&B beat and soaring strings". She stated that "the tune rides a grinding R&B beat" as Jackson sings in a "plaintive falsetto": "My life has taken me beyond the planets and the stars/ And you're the only one that could take me this far/ I'll be forever searching for your love." Kaufman noted that Jackson became more forceful during the chorus, when he sang, "You're the one that makes me strong / I can't make it another day / You're the fire that keeps me warm / I can't make it another day." The journalist also noted the lyrical and melodical similarities between "Another Day" and "Storm", which features Kravitz singing, "I walked away but I was wrong / You're the one that keeps me strong / You're the fire that keeps me warm / How will I get through this storm?"

== Response ==
The song had not been intended for release and Jackson's record label Sony Music Entertainment gained the support of the late entertainer's estate and its lawyers in their endeavor to have the track removed from the Internet on the basis of copyright infringement. Some of their attempts at removal were successful, though individuals continued to upload the audio, one clip garnering 20,000 views within hours.

Following the leak, Kravitz discussed the song in a video he uploaded to the social networking site Twitter. He confirmed that he had written, produced and played instruments on the song, as well as record it with Jackson. Kravitz stated that he was not responsible for the unofficial release, as his copy "has been locked up in a vault". He noted that the two DJs on the snippet were not involved in the recording process, stating, "I don't know what their purpose is, but that person has nothing to do with the track." Kravitz reflected that working with Jackson had been "one of the most amazing musical experiences" that he had ever had. "It was done by two people who had respect for each other and who love music — that was it." The singer-songwriter concluded that "Another Day" had not been mixed or completed but added that he hoped the full song would be released and heard "the way me and Michael intended it to be". It later would be completed and officially released in 2010.

== Critical reception ==
The song received generally positive reviews. Leah Greenblatt of Entertainment Weekly said the song "galvanizes him further", yielding the album (Michael)'s "most genuinely fierce moment". Sarah Rodman of The Boston Globe review the song as "a faint echo of vintage rock-oriented Jackson tracks such as Dirty Diana and Beat It"., " Jody Rosen of Rolling Stone also draw a comparison with this song and Dirty Diana. Jason Lipshutz with Gail Mitchell and Gary Graff from Billboard said the song developed an industrial rock groove that was a bit reminiscent of Nine Inch Nails, "Jackson bellows on the chorus, as guitars envelop his voice and Kravitz repeats the song title like a lullaby,"."

Negative reviews came from Alexis Petridis of The Guardian, he said "of exactly the standard you might expect from a track that failed to make the cut for his worst solo album." Michael Roffman of Consequence of Sound said that the "chalky riff tired 45 seconds into the song" and that "it doesn't beg for a re-listen." Huw Jones of Slant Magazine thought the song "a gutless rock track with dull guest spots from Lenny Kravitz."

=== Dave Grohl controversy ===
Although Dave Grohl is credited as having played drums on the track "(I Can't Make It) Another Day", Grohl himself claimed in the November 2011 issue of The Red Bulletin that he does not perform on the track. According to Grohl, Lenny Kravitz asked him to play on the song but neither Kravitz nor Michael Jackson contacted him after he had recorded his drums and the version of the song that appears on Michael does not feature his playing. Grohl called the fact that he was credited in the album notes despite not playing on the record "not cool".

== Personnel ==
"(I Can't Make It) Another Day" personnel

- Written, produced, mixed, arranged, background vocals, electric guitar, bass, mini moog, timpani, gong, string and horn samples: Lenny Kravitz
- Lead, background vocals and co-produced: Michael Jackson
- 12-string electric guitar: Craig Ross
- Drum programming and noise: David Barron and Lenny Kravitz
- Synthesizer programming: David Baron
- Programming: Craig Ross
- Studio technician and additional synthesizer programming: Alex Alvarez

"Storm" personnel

- Lead vocals, written, produced, mixed, arranged, bass, drums, electric guitar, Hammond organ, piano, wood block: Lenny Kravitz
- Rap vocals, co-written: Jay-Z

== See also ==
- List of unreleased songs recorded by Michael Jackson
- Death of Michael Jackson
- List of music released posthumously
