= I'll Be Waiting (Lenny Kravitz song) =

Single by Lenny Kravitz

from the album It Is Time for a Love Revolution
- Released: November 6, 2007 (iTunes)
- Genre: Rock
- Length: 4:17; 3:58 (w/fade - Radio Version)
- Label: Virgin
- Songwriters: Lenny Kravitz; Craig Ross
- Producer: Lenny Kravitz

Lenny Kravitz singles chronology
"Bring It On" (2007)	"I'll Be Waiting" (2007)	"Love Love Love" (2008)

"I'll Be Waiting" is a rock song written by Lenny Kravitz and Craig Ross for Kravitz's eighth studio album, It Is Time for a Love Revolution (2008). It was released as the album's lead single on December 6, 2007 (although "Bring It On" had been previously released as a radio-only single to U.S. rock stations). The iTunes download release date for the song was November 6, 2007.

The song is a power ballad, where Kravitz sings of waiting for someone, heartbroken over a failed relationship, to realize he is the one who really loves her.

== Chart performance ==
"I'll Be Waiting" has been highly successful across Europe; it topped the charts in the Czech Republic and reached the top five in Italy, the Netherlands, Belgium, and Switzerland and the top ten in Germany, Austria, and Slovakia, peaking at number 13 on a composite European Hot 100 Singles. In Germany, it was his first top-ten single and his best-selling single, reaching number six. It saw mild success in North America, where it peaked at number 73 on the U.S. Billboard Hot 100 and number 45 on the Canadian Hot 100. The single has not charted in Oceania.

== Music video ==
The original video for "I'll Be Waiting" was shot in Central Park in New York City with Marc Webb directing but that video was later shelved and a new version, which Kravitz co-directed with Philip Andelman, was filmed in Kravitz's New York City recording studio. The video which premiered on VH1's Top 20 Countdown at number three is shot entirely in black and white. It features Kravitz in the studio recording the song. He is shown playing the piano, the drums, the guitar, and the bass, and simply singing the song throughout the video. He is also shown towards the end directing the orchestra on the track.

== In popular culture ==
Kravitz performed the song at the American Music Awards of 2007 and on the 2008 Dick Clark's New Year's Rockin' Eve. This song is also featured in the ending credits of the film L: Change the World.

== Charts ==
=== Weekly charts ===
Chart (2007–08)	Peak position
Austria (Ö3 Austria Top 40)	6
Belgium (Ultratop 50 Flanders)	5
Belgium (Ultratop 50 Wallonia)	5
Canada Hot 100 (Billboard)	45
Czech Republic Airplay (ČNS IFPI)	1
Europe (Eurochart Hot 100)	13
Euro Digital Song Sales (Billboard)	13
France (SNEP)	27
Germany (GfK)	6
Hungary (Editors' Choice Top 40)	20
Italy (FIMI)	4
Mexico (Top 20 – Inglés)	5
Netherlands (Dutch Top 40)	5
Netherlands (Single Top 100)	5
Romania (Romanian Top 100)	45
Slovakia Airplay (ČNS IFPI)	6
Sweden (Sverigetopplistan)	16
Switzerland (Schweizer Hitparade)	4
US Billboard Hot 100	73
US Adult Alternative Airplay (Billboard)	14
US Pop 100 (Billboard)	51

=== Year-end charts ===
Chart (2008)	Position
Austria (Ö3 Austria Top 40)	30
Belgium (Ultratop 50 Flanders)	26
Belgium (Ultratop 50 Wallonia)	21
Europe (Eurochart Hot 100)	48
France (SNEP)	95
Germany (Official German Charts)	39
Netherlands (Dutch Top 40)	23
Netherlands (Single Top 100)	56
Switzerland (Schweizer Hitparade)	18

== Certifications ==
Region	Certification	Certified units/sales
Germany (BVMI)	Gold	150,000^{‡}
Japan (RIAJ) Full-length ringtone	Gold	100,000^{*}
Switzerland (IFPI Switzerland)	Gold	15,000^{^}
^{*} Sales figures based on certification alone.^{^} Shipments figures based on certification alone.^{‡} Sales+streaming figures based on certification alone.

== Release history ==
Release dates and formats for "I'll Be Waiting"
Region	Date	Format	Label(s)	Ref.
United States	January 15, 2008	Mainstream airplay	Virgin	
