= Kamil Jafar =

Czech special effects artist

- Occupation: Special effects artist

Kamil Jafar is a Czech special effects artist. He was nominated for an Academy Award in the category Best Visual Effects for the film All Quiet on the Western Front.

== Selected filmography ==
- All Quiet on the Western Front (2022; co-nominated with Frank Petzold, Viktor Müller and Markus Frank)
