= Frank Petzold (visual effects artist) =

German visual effects artist

- Occupation: Visual effects artist

Frank Petzold is a German visual effects artist. He was nominated for an Academy Award in the category Best Visual Effects for the film All Quiet on the Western Front.

== Selected filmography ==
- All Quiet on the Western Front (2022; co-nominated with Viktor Müller, Markus Frank and Kamil Jafar)
