= Markus Frank (visual effects artist) =

German visual effects artist

- Occupation: Visual effects artist

Markus Frank is a German visual effects artist. He was nominated for an Academy Award in the category Best Visual Effects for the film All Quiet on the Western Front.

== Selected filmography ==
- All Quiet on the Western Front (2022; co-nominated with Frank Petzold, Viktor Müller and Kamil Jafar)
