= Camille Friend =

American hairstylist

- Occupation: Hairstylist

Camille Friend is an American hairstylist. She was nominated for an Academy Award in the category Best Makeup and Hairstyling for the film Black Panther: Wakanda Forever.

In addition to her Academy Award nomination, she was nominated for a Primetime Emmy Award in the category Outstanding Hairstyling for her work on the television program 3rd Rock from the Sun. Her nomination was shared with Pixie Schwartz.

== Selected filmography ==
- Black Panther: Wakanda Forever (2022; co-nominated with Joel Harlow)
