= Lady (Lenny Kravitz song) =

2004 single by Lenny Kravitz

Single by Lenny Kravitz

from the album Baptism
- Released: August 30, 2004
- Genre: Rock
- Length: 4:15
- Label: Virgin
- Composers: Lenny Kravitz; Craig Ross
- Lyricist: Lenny Kravitz
- Producer: Lenny Kravitz

Lenny Kravitz singles chronology
"California" (2004)	"Lady" (2004)	"Calling All Angels" (2004)

"Lady" is a song by American rock musician Lenny Kravitz, released as the final single from his seventh studio album, Baptism (2004), in August 2004. In an interview with Hello!, Kravitz revealed that it was inspired by his then-girlfriend, Nicole Kidman. The song reached number 27 in the United States and number 99 in the Netherlands.

== Chart performance ==
"Lady" was the most successful song from Baptism on the US Billboard Hot 100, where it peaked at number 27. It also charted briefly in the Netherlands, reaching number 99 in July 2005.

== Music video ==
The video was directed by Philip Andelman. It consists of Lenny Kravitz playing guitar and singing in a circular stage, while women are dancing around him. There are lights that change depending on the intensity of the sound of the song.

== Track listings ==
European CD single

1. "Lady"
2. "Are You Gonna Go My Way" (live at WXRK, New York City)

European maxi-CD single

1. "Lady"
2. "Are You Gonna Go My Way" (live at WXRK, New York City)
3. "Always on the Run" (live at WXRK, New York City)

== Charts ==
=== Weekly charts ===
Chart (2005)	Peak position
Canada Hot AC (Radio & Records)	12
Canada Rock Top 30 (Radio & Records)	24
Netherlands (Single Top 100)	99
US Billboard Hot 100	27
US Adult Alternative Airplay (Billboard)	6
US Adult Pop Airplay (Billboard)	4
US Adult Contemporary (Billboard)	26
US Pop Airplay (Billboard)	26

=== Year-end charts ===
Chart (2004)	Position
US Adult Top 40 (Billboard)	54

Chart (2005)	Position
US Adult Top 40 (Billboard)	17
US Mainstream Top 40 (Billboard)	90
US Triple-A (Billboard)	23

== Certifications ==
Region	Certification	Certified units/sales
United States (RIAA)	Gold	500,000^{*}
^{*} Sales figures based on certification alone.

== Release history ==
Region	Date	Format(s)	Label(s)	Ref.
United States	August 30, 2004	Hot adult contemporary radio	Virgin	
United States	October 11, 2004	Contemporary hit radio	Virgin	
United Kingdom	November 22, 2004	CD	Virgin	
