= Viktor Müller (visual effects artist) =

Czech visual effects artist

- Occupation: Visual effects artist

Viktor Müller is a Czech visual effects artist. He was nominated for an Academy Award in the category Best Visual Effects for the film All Quiet on the Western Front.

== Selected filmography ==
- All Quiet on the Western Front (2022; co-nominated with Frank Petzold, Markus Frank and Kamil Jafar)
