= Calling All Angels (Lenny Kravitz song) =

2004 single by Lenny Kravitz

Single by Lenny Kravitz

from the album Baptism
- Released: November 15, 2004
- Length: 5:12
- Label: Virgin America
- Songwriter: Lenny Kravitz
- Producer: Lenny Kravitz

Lenny Kravitz singles chronology
"Lady" (2004)	"Calling All Angels" (2004)	"Breathe" (2005)

"Calling All Angels" is the fourth single produced, written, arranged and performed by Lenny Kravitz from his album Baptism, released in 2004.

== Live performances ==
In 2023, Kravitz performed the song for the "In Memoriam" segment at the 95th Academy Awards.

== Chart performance ==
Following the surge in popularity in 2023, "Calling All Angels" charted at number 79 on the UK's Singles Downloads Chart on 17 March 2023.

== Charts ==
Weekly chart performance for "Calling All Angels"
Chart (2004)	Peak position
Germany (GfK)	72
Netherlands (Single Top 100)	35
Switzerland (Schweizer Hitparade)	42

Chart (2023)	Peak position
UK Singles (OCC)	84

== Certifications ==
Region	Certification	Certified units/sales
Brazil (Pro-Música Brasil)	Platinum	60,000^{*}
^{*} Sales figures based on certification alone.
