= Mr. Cab Driver =

- Standard non-US artwork (Australasian release pictured)

Single by Lenny Kravitz

from the album Let Love Rule
- Released: June 29, 1990
- Recorded: 1989
- Length: 3:50 (album version); 3:29 (radio edit)
- Label: Virgin
- Songwriter: Lenny Kravitz
- Producer: Lenny Kravitz

Lenny Kravitz singles chronology
"I Build This Garden for Us" (1990)	"Mr. Cab Driver" (1990)	"Freedom Train" (1990)

"Mr. Cab Driver" is the third single released from Lenny Kravitz debut album, Let Love Rule. It was released in 1990.

== Song information ==
Kravitz wrote the song after an altercation with a cab driver. Although the song deals with racism and discrimination, he wrote it with a sense of humor.

== Music video ==
The black and white music video for Mr. Cab Driver, directed by Geoff Barish, features Kravitz in a similar situation of the song's topic. The music video was shot in the streets of New York City.

== Track listing ==
1. "Mr. Cab Driver" – 3:52
2. "Blues for Sister Someone" (live – 03.1990 – Boston) – 3:33
3. "Does Anybody Out There Even Care" – 3:59
4. "Rosemary" (live – 12.12.1989 – Amsterdam) – 7:11

== See also ==
- Anti-racism
