= Let Love Rule (song) =

Single by Lenny Kravitz

from the album Let Love Rule
- Released: July 23, 1989
- Recorded: 1988
- Genre: Psychedelic rock; neo-psychedelia
- Length: 5:42 (album version); 3:42 (7" edit)
- Label: Virgin
- Songwriter: Lenny Kravitz
- Producer: Lenny Kravitz

Lenny Kravitz singles chronology
| "Spirit of the Forest" (1989) | "Let Love Rule" (1989) | "I Build This Garden for Us" (1990) |

Music video
- "Lenny Kravitz - Let Love Rule (Official Music Video)" on YouTube

Music video
- "Lenny Kravitz - Let Love Rule 2009" on YouTube

"Let Love Rule" is the debut single by American musician Lenny Kravitz and appeared on his debut studio album, Let Love Rule (1989). The song was released in July 1989 by Virgin Records, and is both written and produced by Kravitz. It charted at number 23 on the US Billboard Mainstream Rock Tracks chart, and number five on the Billboard US Modern Rock chart. The song also reached numbers 85 and 89 on the US Cash Box Top 100 and Billboard Hot 100 charts. Kravitz's then-wife Lisa Bonet appears in the accompanying music video for the single.

In April 2009, a remix of the song by the French house duo Justice was released to help promote the 20th anniversary deluxe edition of the album. A music video for the remix was later released in October, directed by Keith Schofield. It depicts a main character interacting with a closing credits scroll.

The song is available as a download for Rock Band and Guitar Hero 5.

== Critical reception ==
David Giles from Music Week wrote, "Debut from a New York vocalist who has astonishingly managed to reproduce the classic sound of Al Green in full flight. His voice isn't quite as syrupy, naturally, but he's got the woozy Hammond organ and the fat brass down to a tee. And the song itself isn't at all bad either." Pan-European magazine Music & Media selected the track as a single of the week and called it "a lesson in classic pop." As per reviewer: "Kravitz's raucous voice, a cross between Elvis Costello and TT D'Arby is well supported by a rootsy organ, jangling guitar and 60s style drums. The saxophone solo is splendid as are the Beatles-style bass-riffs and backing vocals."

== Track listings ==
- CD / 12"
1. "Let Love Rule" – 5:42
2. "Empty Hands" – 4:42
3. "Blues For Sister Someone" – 3:00
4. "Flower Child" – 2:56
- CD / 12" another version
1. "Let Love Rule" – 5:42
2. "Cold Turkey" (Live) at Los Angeles – 5:25
3. "My Precious Love" (Live) at New York – 3:00
- 7"

A. "Let Love Rule"
B. "Empty Hands"

- Limited Edition 10"

A. "Let Love Rule" – 5:39
B1. "If Six Were Nine" – 6:44
B2. "My Precious Love" – 7:08

== Charts ==
| Chart (1989–1990) | Peak position |
|---|---|
| Australia (ARIA) | 36 |
| Europe (Eurochart Hot 100) | 92 |
| Netherlands (Dutch Top 40) | 23 |
| Netherlands (Single Top 100) | 26 |
| UK Singles (OCC) | 39 |
| US Billboard Hot 100 | 89 |
| US Mainstream Rock Tracks (Billboard) | 23 |
| US Modern Rock Tracks (Billboard) | 5 |
| US Cash Box Top 100 | 85 |

== Members ==
- Lenny Kravitz – vocals, guitar, bass, drums
- Henry Hirsch – organ
- Karl Denson – saxophone
