= Where Are We Runnin'? =

2004 single by Lenny Kravitz

Single by Lenny Kravitz

from the album Baptism
- B-side: "Uncharted Terrain"; "Destiny"
- Released: April 5, 2004
- Genre: Rock
- Length: 2:41
- Label: Virgin
- Composers: Lenny Kravitz; Craig Ross
- Lyricist: Lenny Kravitz
- Producer: Lenny Kravitz

Lenny Kravitz singles chronology
"Show Me Your Soul" (2003)	"Where Are We Runnin'?" (2004)	"Storm" (2004)

Music video
- "Where Are We Runnin'?" on YouTube

"Where Are We Runnin'?" is a song performed by American rock musician Lenny Kravitz. It was released on April 5, 2004, as the lead single from his seventh studio album, Baptism (2004). Kravitz wrote the song with his long-time collaborator Craig Ross and produced it himself. Following its release, the song reached number 69 in the United States, number 13 in Italy, number five in Canada, and number four in Spain.

== Composition ==
"Where Are We Runnin'?" is an uptempo rock song. Lenny Kravitz wrote the song inspired by contemporary rock musicians' lives, describing them as busy and worried.

== Critical reception ==
Carla Hay of AXS stated, "'Where Are We Runnin'' is an often-overlooked, high-energy stomper of a song that stands as one of Kravitz's best. It was the first single from his 2004 album, Baptism, and showed that Kravitz wasn't going to be mellowing out anytime soon."

== Chart performance ==
The song peaked at number 69 on the US Billboard Hot 100, Kravitz's first appearance on that chart since 2001's "Dig In". It also peaked at number 30 on the Billboard Mainstream Rock Tracks chart and number 40 on the Billboard Modern Rock Tracks chart; this is his last song to date to appear on the latter chart. It charted in several countries worldwide, reaching number 18 in the Netherlands, number 13 in Italy, and number four in Spain.

== Music video ==
The music video for "Where Are We Runnin'?" was directed by Philip Andelman and Lenny Kravitz. Kravitz portrays an amplified version of himself as he wakes up in a hotel room surrounded by nude women and empty bottles of alcohol. Once awoken, he is taken by his team out of the hotel—where he and his entourage are mobbed by innumerable cheering fans—and to the airport via limousine. Inside a private jet, Kravitz, his band and additional women are shown engaging in varying levels of debauchery as they eat, drink and make love. At the concert venue, a fight breaks out in the dressing room and Kravitz passes out from exhaustion and drug use. He is taken care of on the spot by paramedics. On stage, Kravitz and his band deliver an electrifying performance of the final chorus before retreating to the dressing room. Against the sound of filtered radio interference, Kravitz walks for a full minute in a single shot from the stage back to the dressing room, where he collapses in a chair from exhaustion and the chemicals rushing through his system.

== Track listings ==
Canadian and European CD single

1. "Where Are We Runnin'?" – 2:44
2. "Uncharted Terrain" – 4:20

European and Australian maxi-CD single

1. "Where Are We Runnin'?" – 2:44
2. "Uncharted Terrain" – 4:20
3. "Destiny" – 4:53

== Personnel ==
Personnel are taken from the US promo CD liner notes.

- Lenny Kravitz – words, music, vocals, electric guitar solo, bass, production, arrangement
- Craig Ross – music, electric guitar, drums, tambourine
- Henry Hirsch – piano

== Charts ==
=== Weekly charts ===
Chart (2004)	Peak position
Australia (ARIA)	52
Austria (Ö3 Austria Top 40)	27
Belgium (Ultratip Bubbling Under Flanders)	12
Belgium (Ultratip Bubbling Under Wallonia)	13
Canada (Nielsen BDS)	5
Canada Rock Top 30 (Radio & Records)	5
Croatia (HRT)	6
Germany (GfK)	43
Greece (IFPI)	48
Hungary (Rádiós Top 40)	35
Italy (FIMI)	13
Netherlands (Dutch Top 40)	18
Netherlands (Single Top 100)	33
Spain (Promusicae)	4
Switzerland (Schweizer Hitparade)	31
US Billboard Hot 100	69
US Adult Alternative Airplay (Billboard)	2
US Adult Pop Airplay (Billboard)	12
US Alternative Airplay (Billboard)	40
US Mainstream Rock (Billboard)	30
US Pop Airplay (Billboard)	35

=== Year-end charts ===
Chart (2004)	Position
US Adult Top 40 (Billboard)	46
US Triple-A (Billboard)	17

== Release history ==
Region	Date	Format(s)	Label(s)	Ref.
United States	April 5, 2004	Hot AC; mainstream rock; active rock; triple A; alternative radio	Virgin	
United States	April 12, 2004	Contemporary hit radio	Virgin	
Australia	May 3, 2004	CD	Virgin	
United Kingdom	May 3, 2004	CD	Virgin	
