= Let Love Rule (Lenny Kravitz album) =

Studio album by Lenny Kravitz
- Released: September 6, 1989
- Recorded: 1988–1989
- Genre: Psychedelic rock; psychedelic soul
- Length: 55:27
- Label: Virgin
- Producer: Lenny Kravitz

Lenny Kravitz chronology
Let Love Rule (1989)	Mama Said (1991)

Alternative cover
- Digipak cover

Singles from Let Love Rule
- 1. "Let Love Rule" Released: July 23, 1989; 2. "I Build This Garden for Us" Released: January 18, 1990; 3. "Mr. Cab Driver" Released: June 29, 1990; 4. "Be" Released: August 13, 1990; 5. "Does Anybody Out There Even Care" Released: February 6, 1991

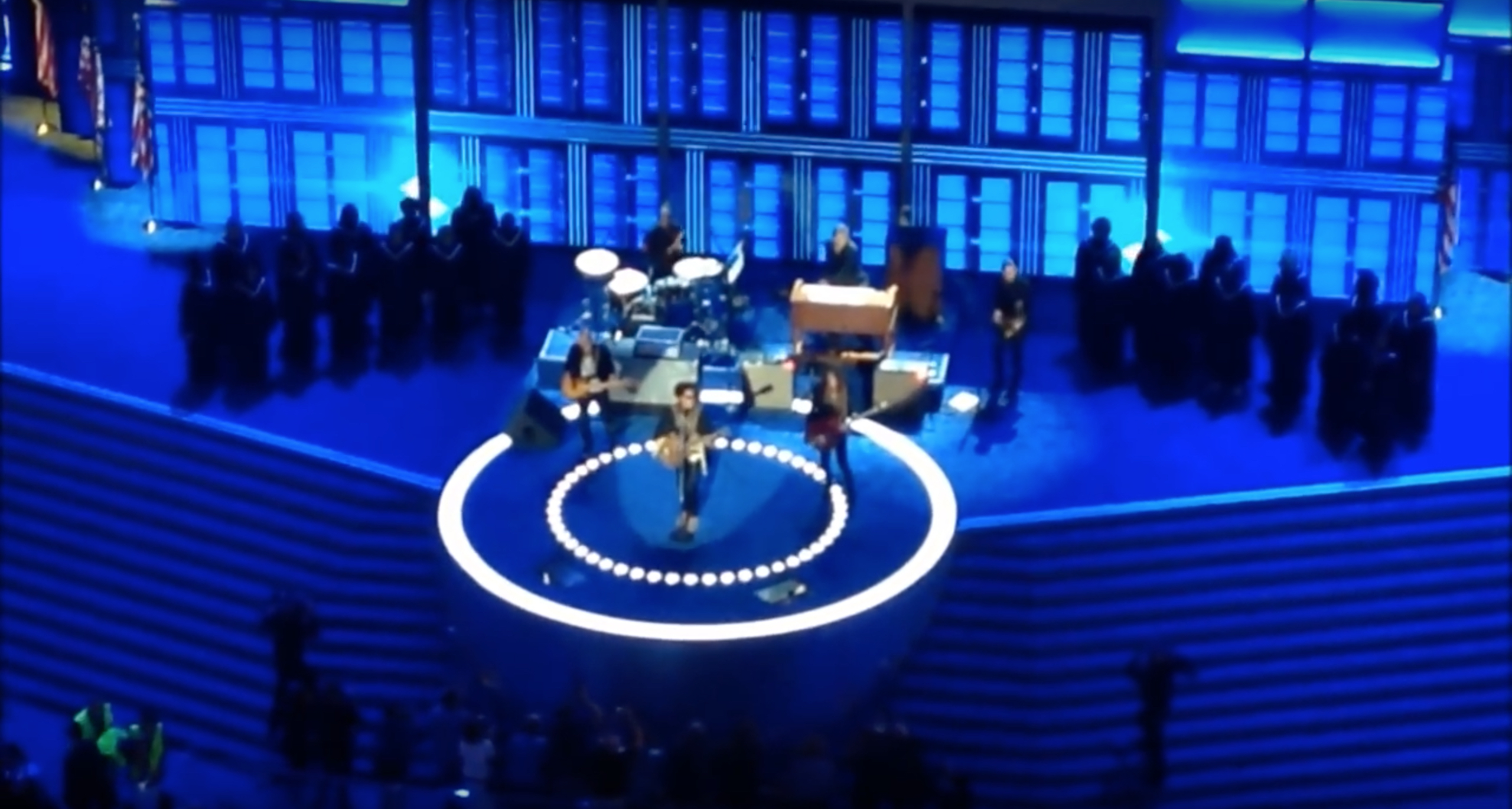
Kravitz performing "Let Love Rule" at the 2016 Democratic National Convention

Let Love Rule is the debut studio album of American rock musician Lenny Kravitz, released on September 6, 1989, by Virgin Records. Then-wife Lisa Bonet wrote the lyrics to "Fear" and co-wrote the lyrics on the song "Rosemary"; other than that the album is virtually a one-man Kravitz show, as he wrote and produced all the songs and played nearly all the instruments.

Let Love Rule reached number 61 on the Billboard 200, while it peaked at number 56 on the UK Albums Chart. The album is also featured in the book 1001 Albums You Must Hear Before You Die. The video for the lead single "Let Love Rule" was nominated for an MTV Video Music Award for Best New Artist.

== Critical reception ==
Professional ratings
Review scores
Source	Rating
AllMusic	4.5/5 stars
American Songwriter	4.5/5 stars
Chicago Tribune	3/4 stars
Los Angeles Times	3/5 stars
Mojo	4/5 stars
NME	8/10
Q	4/5 stars
Record Collector	3/5 stars
Rolling Stone	4/5 stars
The Village Voice	B−

The Globe and Mail concluded that Kravitz is "still a little raw and the lyrics ... are forgettable, but there are enough good ideas here—even if a few of them were borrowed wholesale from the Beatles—to make Let Love Rule a satisfying debut."

== Track listing ==
All tracks written by Lenny Kravitz, except "Fear" lyrics by Lisa Bonet, and "Rosemary" lyrics by Kravitz and Bonet.

1. "Sittin' on Top of the World" – 3:16
2. "Let Love Rule" – 5:42
3. "Freedom Train" – 2:50
4. "My Precious Love" – 5:15
5. "I Build This Garden for Us" – 6:16
6. "Fear" – 5:20
7. "Does Anybody Out There Even Care" – 3:42
8. "Mr. Cab Driver" – 3:49
9. "Rosemary" – 5:27
10. "Be" – 3:16

CD bonus tracks

11. "Blues for Sister Someone" – 2:51
12. "Empty Hands" – 4:42
13. "Flower Child" – 2:56

American version

14. "What The ... Are We Saying? – Live"
15. "Stop Draggin' Around – Live"
16. "Always on the Run – Live"
17. "I'll Be Around – Live"

=== 20th anniversary edition bonus tracks ===
All tracks written by Lenny Kravitz, except where noted.

14. "Let Love Rule" (Basic Rough Mix)
15. "Cold Turkey" (John Lennon)
16. "Light Skin Girl from London"
17. "Fear" (1987 demo)
18. "Mr. Cab Driver" (home demo)
19. "Let Love Rule" (home demo)
- Track 16 first appeared on the single "Always on the Run", but was originally recorded on tour with "Let Love Rule".

Disc 2 (Let Love Rule Live)

1. "Flower Child"
2. "Blues for Sister Someone"
3. "Mr. Cab Driver"
4. "Freedom Train"
5. "Be"
6. "My Precious Love"
7. "Does Anybody Out There Even Care"
8. "Let Love Rule"
9. "Rosemary" (lyrics by Kravitz and Bonet)
10. "Fear" (lyrics by Bonet)
11. "My Flash on You" (Arthur Lee)
12. "If 6 Was 9" (Jimi Hendrix)
- Tracks 1–10 recorded at The Paradise, Boston, Mass. – 3/28/90
- Tracks 11–12 recorded at The Paradiso, Amsterdam – 12/20/89

== Personnel ==
Credits adapted from the album's liner notes from the 20th Anniversary Deluxe Edition.

Musicians

- Lenny Kravitz – lead and backing vocals, all other instruments
- Alfred Brown – viola (tracks 6, 10)
- Tisha Campbell – additional background vocals (track 5)
- Eric Delente – violin (tracks 5, 12)
- Karl Denson – saxophone (tracks 2–4, 7, 8, 11, 13)
- Lou Elex – violin (track 6)
- Henry Hirsch – bass (tracks 5, 12), Fender Rhodes (tracks 5–7), harmonium (track 12), organ (tracks 2, 4, 5, 9), piano (tracks 4, 10, 13)
- Nancy Ives – cello (tracks 5, 12)
- Lee Jaffe – harmonica (tracks 9, 12)
- Jean McClain – additional background vocals (track 5)
- Kermit Moore – cello (tracks 6, 10)
- Gene Orloff – violin (track 6)
- Yolanda Pittman – additional background vocals (track 5)
- Matthew Raimondi – violin (tracks 6, 10)
- Maxine Roach – viola (track 6)
- Mark Shuman – cello (tracks 6, 10)
- John Tintaualle – violin (track 6)
- Adam Widoff – 2nd guitar (track 6)
- Winterton Yarvey – violin (track 6)

Production

- Lenny Kravitz – producer, mixing (tracks 15, 16)
- Henry Hirsch – recording engineer (tracks 2–13, 16), mixing (tracks 1–13, 16)
- David Domanich – recording engineer (tracks 2–13)
- Jeff Goodman – recording engineer (track 1), mixing (track 14)
- Greg Calbi – mastering
- Mathieu Bitton – producer (20th anniversary deluxe edition)
- Gavin Lurssen – remastering (20th anniversary deluxe edition)
- Ruben Cohen – remastering assistant (20th anniversary deluxe edition)

Let Love Rule Live

- Lenny Kravitz – vocals, guitar
- Kenneth Crouch – keyboards
- Zoro – drums
- Adam Widoff – guitar
- Lebron Scott – bass
- Karl Denson – saxophone
- Steven Remote – recording engineer and mixing engineer (tracks 1–10)
- Tom "Bone" Edmonds – recording engineer and mixing engineer (tracks 11, 12), original mixing (tracks 1–10)
- Mathieu Bitton – editing
- Gabriel Wallach – editing

== Charts ==
=== Weekly charts ===
Weekly chart performance for Let Love Rule
Chart (1989–1990)	Peak position
Australian Albums (ARIA)	45
Dutch Albums (Album Top 100)	26
Swedish Albums (Sverigetopplistan)	32
Swiss Albums (Schweizer Hitparade)	12
UK Albums (OCC)	56
US Billboard 200	61

=== Year-end charts ===
Year-end chart performance for Let Love Rule
Chart (1990)	Position
Dutch Albums (Album Top 100)	87

== Certifications and sales ==
Certifications and sales for Let Love Rule
Region	Certification	Certified units/sales
Canada (Music Canada)	Platinum	100,000^{^}
France (SNEP)	Gold	100,000^{*}
Netherlands (NVPI)	Gold	50,000^{^}
Switzerland (IFPI Switzerland)	Gold	25,000^{^}
United Kingdom (BPI)	Gold	100,000^{^}
United States (RIAA)	Gold	760,000
^{*} Sales figures based on certification alone.^{^} Shipments figures based on certification alone.
