= Black Diamond (Angie Stone album) =

Studio album by Angie Stone
- Released: September 28, 1999
- Genre: R&B; neo soul; funk
- Length: 54:46
- Label: Arista
- Producer: Gerry DeVeaux; Angie Stone; Cutfather & Joe; DJ U-Neek; Russell Elevado; Aaron "Freedom" Lyles; Ali Shaheed Muhammad; Rex Rideout; Phil Temple

Angie Stone chronology
Black Diamond (1999)	Mahogany Soul (2001)

Singles from Black Diamond
- 1. "No More Rain (In This Cloud)" Released: August 17, 1999; 2. "Life Story" Released: 2000; 3. "Everyday" Released: 2000

Black Diamond is the debut album by American singer Angie Stone. It was released on September 28, 1999, by Arista Records. The album was named after Stone's daughter Diamond Ti'ara.

== Background ==
Stone rose to fame in the late 1970s as member of the hip-hop trio the Sequence who scored a hit on the US Top Black Singles chart with their 1979 single "Funk You Up." After Sequence disbanded, she began writing songs for Jill Jones and had a stint playing saxophone in Lenny Kravitz's band. In the early 1990s, she became the lead vocalist of the R&B trio Vertical Hold, with whom she released two studio albums, and made herself a name as a songwriter for Mary J. Blige, and with D'Angelo who was Stone's boyfriend at the time. In 1996, Stone became a featured vocalist for Gerry DeVeaux and Charlie Mole's group DeVox. Together, they recorded one album, Devox featuring Angie B. Stone. it received a Japan-wide release only through DeVeaux's DeVox label, serving as its inaugural release.

In 1997, one song co-written by Stone and D'Angelo, "Everyday," was featured on the soundtrack to the 1997 film Money Talks. Though she had signed with the United Kingdom division of Arista Records earlier that year, the song prompted the label's then A&R manager Peter Edge to bring Stone to label head Clive Davis's attention, who was impressed by "her voice and deep emotional connection to traditional soul music" and signed her to his US division.

== Critical reception ==
Professional ratings
Review scores
Source	Rating
AllMusic	4/5 stars
The Daily Telegraph	4/5 stars
Entertainment Weekly	B+
Hot Press	9/12
The Independent	5/5 stars
NOW	4/5 Ns
Q	3/5 stars
Rolling Stone	3.5/5 stars
USA Today	3/4 stars

In his review for Billboard, Michael Paoletta declared the album "a musically rich and empowering journey through life's many ups and downs" that pairs "smooth, mellow grooves [...] with emotion-packed lyrics." He further wrote: "For those lamenting the lack of honest R&B/soul, stop worrying: With Black Diamond, it's back where it belongs." AllMusic editor Theresa E. LaVeck noted that "purposefully positive, the album chronicles Stone's journeys maintaining personal faith and loving relationships, resplendent with new takes on traditional soul sounds. Stone supports her songwriting and vocal talents with help from A-list musicians/writer/producers such as Lenny Kravitz and D'Angelo. The sophisticated mix is elevated by Stone's incredible voice." Ronda Racha Penrice from Vibe wrote that Stone's "soul-rendering delivery and vocal lushness is a welcomed addition to Arista's House of R&B Divas. With that said, the resident divas [...] should have no problem making accommodations for Stone in their humble abode at Arista."

USA Today's Steve Jones remarked "South Carolina native Stone honed her songwriting skills penning tunes for people such as D'Angelo and Mary J. Blige, but on this earthy debut she quickly establishes herself as an artist to be reckoned with. Stone's rich, mature voice lends an authenticity to lyrics that touch the jagged surface and underlying emotions between people trying to work out or move on from relationships. She deftly blends old-school sentiments and current sensibilities and wraps them around grooves that work at any time." Ayana Byrd, writing for Rolling Stone, compared Stone's vocal performance with Chaka Khan and Gladys Knight and remarked that "Stone's Southern country-road sensibilities prevent her from being derivative of her obvious influences; instead, Black Diamond shines with the intensity of brilliant soul." BBC Music critic Daryl Easlea called the album "a fine debut" that proclaims "after years of struggle, Stone's arrival as an artist in her own right." Kerry Potter from Q described Black Diamond as "a low-key album of quietly poetic soul, epitomised by the muffled funk of "Green Grass Vapors." [It] is meandering and over-polished at times, but, in the main, hints at a sparkling future." Exclaim! editor Del F. Cowie complimented the album for its "classy and subdued mood."

== Chart performance ==
Black Diamond debuted at number 144 on the US Billboard 200 in the week of October 16, 1999, with first week sales of 10,000 copies. It was not until February 19, 2000, that it peaked at number 46. Two weeks prior, on February 2, 2000, the album had been certified Gold by the Recording Industry Association of America (RIAA). By September 2003, Black Diamond had sold 812,000 copies in the United States.

== Track listing ==
Standard edition
No.	Title	Writer(s)	Producer(s)	Length
1.	"Freedom (Intro)"	Angie Stone	Stone	0:42
2.	"No More Rain (In This Cloud)"	Stone; Bert Williams; Gordon Chambers; Jim Weatherly	Stone	4:42
3.	"Green Grass Vapors"	Aaron Lyles; Stephanie Bolton	Aaron "Freedom" Lyles; Stone	4:14
4.	"Everyday"	Stone; D'Angelo	Russell Elevado	3:28
5.	"Coulda Been You"	Stone; Sekou Aiken; Rex Rideout; Phil Temple	Rideout; Temple; Stone	4:25
6.	"Visions"	Virgil Davis Jr.; Tim Middleton; Jon Lind; Maurice White	DJ U-Neek	3:31
7.	"Life Story"	Gerry DeVeaux; Craig Ross	DeVeaux; Cutfather & Joe^{[a]}	4:07
8.	"Just a Pimp"	Lyles; Bolton	Lyles; Stone	4:12
9.	"Trouble Man"	Marvin Gaye	Stone; Lyles	2:33
10.	"Bone 2 Pic (Wit U)"	Ali Shaheed Muhammad; Stone; Chalmers Alford	Muhammad	5:19
11.	"Man Loves His Money"	Lyles; Bolton	Lyles; Stone	4:11
12.	"Love Junkie"	Stone	Stone; Lyles	4:18
13.	"Black Diamonds & Blue Pearls (Interlude)"	Stone	Stone	1:35
14.	"Heaven Help" (bonus track)	DeVeaux; Terry Britten	DeVeaux	3:19
15.	"Don't Wanna Ride Without You" (hidden track)	Stone		4:10
Total length:				54:46

German edition bonus tracks
No.	Title	Writer(s)	Length
15.	"Without You"	Stone	3:35
16.	"Thank You"	Stone; Robyn Smith	0:23

UK edition
No.	Title	Writer(s)	Producer(s)	Length
1.	"Freedom (Intro)"	Stone	Stone	0:42
2.	"No More Rain (In This Cloud)"	Stone; Williams; Chambers; Weatherly	Stone	4:42
3.	"Everyday"	Stone; D'Angelo	Elevado	3:28
4.	"Bone 2 Pic (Wit U)"	Muhammad; Stone; Alford	Muhammad	5:19
5.	"Life Story"	DeVeaux; Ross	DeVeaux; Cutfather & Joe^{[a]}	4:07
6.	"Visions"	Davis; Middleton; Lind; White	DJ U-Neek	3:31
7.	"Coulda Been You"	Stone; Aiken; Rideout; Temple	Rideout; Temple; Stone	4:25
8.	"Just a Pimp"	Lyles; Bolton	Lyles; Stone	4:12
9.	"Black Diamonds & Blue Pearls (Interlude)"	Stone	Stone	1:35
10.	"Green Grass Vapors"	Lyles; Bolton	Lyles; Stone	4:14
11.	"Baby Slow Down"	DeVeaux; Stone; Charlie Mole	DeVeaux	4:09
12.	"Love Junkie"	Stone	Stone; Lyles	4:18
13.	"Trouble Man"	Gaye	Stone; Lyles	2:33
14.	"My Lovin' Will Give You Something"	DeVeaux; David Gamson; Melvin Ragin	DeVeaux	4:33
15.	"Heaven Help"	DeVeaux; Britten	DeVeaux	3:19
16.	"Life Story" (Jazz Hop Mix) (includes hidden track "Don't Wanna Ride Without You")	DeVeaux; Ross	DeVeaux; Full Crew^{[a]}	8:14

Japanese edition and German reissue
No.	Title	Writer(s)	Producer(s)	Length
15.	"Thank You"	Stone; Smith		0:23
16.	"Heaven Help"	DeVeaux; Britten	DeVeaux	3:19
17.	"Life Story" (Jazz Hop Mix)	DeVeaux; Ross	DeVeaux; Full Crew^{[a]}	4:16
18.	"Without You"	Stone		3:35

Digital deluxe edition (disc one)
No.	Title	Writer(s)	Producer(s)	Length
1.	"Freedom (Intro)"	Stone	Stone	0:42
2.	"No More Rain (In This Cloud)"	Stone; Williams; Chambers; Weatherly	Stone	4:42
3.	"Green Grass Vapors"	Lyles; Bolton	Lyles; Stone	4:14
4.	"Everyday"	Stone; D'Angelo	Elevado	3:28
5.	"Coulda Been You"	Stone; Aiken; Rideout; Temple	Rideout; Temple; Stone	4:25
6.	"Visions"	Davis; Middleton; Lind; White	DJ U-Neek	3:31
7.	"Life Story"	DeVeaux; Ross	DeVeaux; Cutfather & Joe^{[a]}	4:07
8.	"Just a Pimp"	Lyles; Bolton	Lyles; Stone	4:12
9.	"Trouble Man"	Gaye	Stone; Lyles	2:33
10.	"Bone 2 Pic (Wit U)"	Muhammad; Stone; Alford	Muhammad	5:19
11.	"Man Loves His Money"	Lyles; Bolton	Lyles; Stone	4:11
12.	"Love Junkie"	Stone	Stone; Lyles	4:18
13.	"Black Diamonds & Blue Pearls (Interlude)"	Stone	Stone	1:35
14.	"Heaven Help"	DeVeaux; Britten	DeVeaux	3:19
15.	"Without You"	Stone		3:35
16.	"Thank You"	Stone; Smith		0:22
17.	"Baby Slow Down"	DeVeaux; Stone; Mole	DeVeaux	4:09
18.	"Ear-Responsible"			4:32
19.	"Work It Out"	Stone		3:23
20.	"My Lovin' Will Give You Something"	DeVeaux; Gamson; Ragin	DeVeaux	4:33
21.	"I Gotta Thing for You"	Stone		5:08

Digital deluxe edition (disc two)
No.	Title	Writer(s)	Producer(s)	Length
1.	"No More Rain (In This Cloud)" (StarGate Radio Mix)	Stone; Williams; Chambers; Weatherly	Stone; StarGate^{[b]}	3:57
2.	"No More Rain (In This Cloud)" (Erick Sermon Remix) (featuring Loon)	Stone; Williams; Chambers; Weatherly	Stone; Sermon^{[b]}	4:17
3.	"No More Rain (In This Cloud)" (Wookie Vocal Mix)	Stone; Williams; Chambers; Weatherly	Stone; Wookie^{[b]}	4:48
4.	"Everyday" (Mike City Remix)	Stone; D'Angelo	Elevado; Mike City^{[a]}^{[b]}	3:58
5.	"Everyday" (Neptunes Remix) (featuring Pusha T)	Stone; D'Angelo	Elevado; The Neptunes^{[a]}^{[b]}	4:20
6.	"Everyday" (Suli & Stef Bass Remix) (featuring Mad Snake)	Stone; D'Angelo	Elevado; Suli & Stef^{[a]}^{[b]}	4:49
7.	"Everyday" (Full Crew Rap Mix) (featuring Phoebe 1)	Stone; D'Angelo	Elevado; Amos Oke^{[a]}^{[b]}; Orlando Gittens^{[a]}^{[b]}	3:52
8.	"Everyday" (Soultown Mix) (featuring Phoebe 1)	Stone; D'Angelo	Elevado; Oke^{[a]}^{[b]}; Gittens^{[a]}^{[b]}	4:23
9.	"Life Story" (Jazz Hop Mix)	DeVeaux; Ross	DeVeaux; Full Crew^{[a]}^{[b]}	4:15
10.	"Life Story" (Full Crew Hip Hop Mix)	DeVeaux; Ross	DeVeaux; Full Crew^{[a]}^{[b]}	4:21
11.	"Life Story" (Booker T Vocal Mix)	DeVeaux; Ross	DeVeaux; Booker T^{[a]}^{[b]}	5:39
12.	"Life Story" (Club 69 Future Mix)	DeVeaux; Ross	DeVeaux; Peter Rauhofer^{[a]}^{[b]}	3:36
13.	"Life Story" (music video)			4:08
14.	"Everyday" (music video)			3:26
15.	"No More Rain (In This Cloud)" (music video)			4:13
16.	"Behind the Scenes" (video)			8:02
17.	"Everyday" (Neptunes Remix) (music video)			3:29

Notes

- ^{^a} signifies an additional producer
- ^{^b} signifies a remixer

Sample credits

- "No More Rain (In This Cloud)" contains excerpts and samples of "Neither One of Us (Wants to Be the First to Say Goodbye)" by Gladys Knight & the Pips.

== Personnel ==
Credits adapted from the liner notes of Black Diamond.

=== Musicians ===
- Angie Stone – vocals
- Joe Belmaati – programming, musician
- Rex Rideout – programming, musician
- Chalmers "Spanky" Alford – musician
- D'Angelo – musician
- Iran – musician
- Jonas Krag – musician
- Lenny Kravitz – musician
- Aaron "Freedom" Lyles – musician
- Ali Shaheed Muhammad – musician
- Joe Quinde – musician
- Craig Ross – musician
- Sekou Aiken – background vocals
- Stephanie Bolton – background vocals
- Gerry DeVeaux – background vocals
- Tenita Jordan Dreher – background vocals
- Gemini – background vocals
- Juliet Roberts – background vocals

=== Technical ===
- Angie Stone – production (tracks 1–3, 5, 8, 9, 11–13); recording engineering, mix engineering, executive production
- Aaron "Freedom" Lyles – production (tracks 3, 8, 9, 11, 12); recording engineering, mix engineering
- Ali Shaheed Muhammad – production (track 10); recording engineering
- Russell Elevado – production (track 4)
- Rex Rideout – production (track 5); engineering assistance
- Phil Temple – production (track 5)
- DJ U-Neek – production (track 6)
- Gerry DeVeaux – production (tracks 7, 14); executive production
- Cutfather & Joe – remix, additional production (track 7); mix engineering
- Aaron Connor – recording engineering
- Tim Donovan – recording engineering, mix engineering
- Tim Hunt – recording engineering
- Eli Lishinsky – recording engineering
- Kevin "K.D." Davis – mix engineering
- Tony Maserati – mix engineering
- Mads Nilsson – mix engineering
- Soul Spin – mix engineering
- Denise Barbarita – engineering assistance
- Erik Fryland – engineering assistance
- Charles McCrorey – engineering assistance
- Jeff Gregory – engineering assistance
- Susanne Savage – production coordination
- Miriam Gonzales – production coordination
- Jo Jones – production coordination
- Lesvia Castro – production coordination
- Coen Antonisse – production coordination
- Herb Powers Jr. – mastering
- Peter Edge – executive production

=== Artwork ===
- Margery Greenspan – art direction
- Sheri G. Lee – art direction, design
- Ruvén Afanador – photography
- Phil Knott – back cover photography
- Angie Stone – collage construction
- Lori Demsey – collage construction

== Charts ==
=== Weekly charts ===
Weekly performance for Black Diamond
Chart (2000–2002)	Peak position
Australian Albums (ARIA)	84
Dutch Albums (Album Top 100)	28
Norwegian Albums (VG-lista)	38
UK Albums (OCC)	62
UK R&B Albums (OCC)	4
US Billboard 200	46
US Top R&B/Hip-Hop Albums (Billboard)	9

=== Year-end charts ===
Year-end performance for Black Diamond
Chart (2000)	Position
US Billboard 200	158
US Top R&B/Hip-Hop Albums (Billboard)	31

== Certifications ==
Certifications for Black Diamond
Region	Certification	Certified units/sales
Netherlands (NVPI)	Gold	50,000^{^}
United Kingdom (BPI)	Gold	100,000^{^}
United States (RIAA)	Gold	812,000
^{^} Shipments figures based on certification alone.

== Release history ==
Release dates and formats for Black Diamond
Region	Date	Format	Edition	Label	Ref.
United States	September 28, 1999	CD; cassette	Standard	Arista	
Germany	November 8, 1999	CD	Standard	BMG	
Canada	February 8, 2000	CD	Standard	BMG	
Japan	February 16, 2000	CD	Standard	EMI	
United Kingdom	February 28, 2000	CD	Standard	Arista	
Germany	March 20, 2000	CD	Reissue	BMG	
Various	September 18, 2012	Digital download	Deluxe	BRM; Peace Bisquit	
