= Heaven Help =

1993 single by Lenny Kravitz

Single by Lenny Kravitz

from the album Are You Gonna Go My Way
- B-side: "Spinning Around Over You"; "B Side Blues"
- Released: August 16, 1993
- Genre: Soul
- Length: 3:11
- Label: Virgin America
- Songwriters: Gerry DeVeaux; Terry Britten
- Producer: Lenny Kravitz

Lenny Kravitz singles chronology
"Believe" (1993)	"Heaven Help" (1993)	"The Buddha of Suburbia" (1993)

Music video
- "Heaven Help" on YouTube

"Heaven Help" is a song by American rock musician Lenny Kravitz, released in August 1993 by Virgin America as the third single from his third studio album, Are You Gonna Go My Way (1993). The song was written by Gerry DeVeaux and Terry Britten, and produced by Kravitz. It made a brief appearance on the US Billboard Hot 100, reaching number 92. In the United Kingdom, it became his second top-20 hit from Are You Gonna Go My Way, peaking at number 20, while in Canada and New Zealand, the song reached the top 30. The accompanying music video was directed by Per Gustafsson, featuring a shirtless Kravitz performing in between a story of him making out with a girlfriend in an old apartment. "Heaven Help" was later included on Kravitz' compilation album Greatest Hits.

== Critical reception ==
Larry Flick from Billboard magazine wrote, "A quiet moment from Kravitz's rightfully acclaimed Are You Gonna Go My Way. Simple piano/drum ballad places much emphasis on his expressive vocals and the song's gorgeous melody. A sure bet for album rock play, this deserves to be a massive hit at Top 40. It would add a nice touch of class to any playlist." Speed and Martinucci from the Gavin Report noted that accompanied simply by a piano and guitar, "Kravitz comes with a soulful love song that's reminiscent early '70s soul ballads recorded with real instruments." Gavin Report editor Dave Sholin concluded, "This release should help win him even more fans." Adam Sweeting from The Guardian felt Kravitz is "squeezing a mellow soulful feel" out of the song. In his weekly UK chart commentary, James Masterton commented, "Third hit in a row for the superstar finds him this time wearing his Isley Brothers influences on his sleeve." Alan Jones from Music Week wrote, "A gentle and intimate delight, sweet and understated, with hints of Curtis Mayfield. Given plenty of airplay, there's no reason why it shouldn't make the Top 20."

== Track listings ==
- US maxi-CD single
1. "Heaven Help" – 3:10
2. "Spinning Around Over You" – 3:35
3. "B Side Blues" – 3:32
4. "Are You Gonna Go My Way – 3:30
5. "Freedom Time" / "Always on the Run" (live) – 9:42
- US cassette single
1. "Heaven Help" – 3:10
2. "Spinning Around Over You" – 3:34
- UK CD1
1. "Heaven Help"
2. "Eleutheria"
3. "Sister" (live)
4. "Heaven Help" (acoustic version)
- UK CD2 and 12-inch single, Australasian CD single
1. "Heaven Help" – 3:09
2. "Eleutheria" – 4:48
3. "Ascension" – 3:45
4. "Brother" – 4:16
- UK 7-inch and cassette single, European CD single
1. "Heaven Help" – 3:10
2. "Eleutheria" – 4:48
- European maxi-CD single
1. "Heaven Help"
2. "Ascension"
3. "Brother"
4. "Sister" (live)
5. "Heaven Help" (acoustic version)
- Japanese mini-album
1. "Heaven Help"
2. "Brother"
3. "Ascension"
4. "I Build This Garden for Us"
5. "Fields of Joy"
6. "Stand by My Woman"
7. "Sister" (live)
8. "Heaven Help" (acoustic version)

== Charts ==
Chart (1993)	Peak position
Australia (ARIA)	76
Canada Top Singles (RPM)	25
Europe (Eurochart Hot 100)	59
Europe (European Hit Radio)	13
France (SNEP)	41
Germany (GfK)	98
Iceland (Íslenski Listinn Topp 40)	7
Netherlands (Dutch Top 40 Tipparade)	10
Netherlands (Single Top 100 Tipparade)	5
New Zealand (Recorded Music NZ)	21
UK Singles (Official Charts)	20
UK Airplay (Music Week)	15
US Billboard Hot 100	92

== Release history ==
Region	Date	Format(s)	Label(s)	Ref.
United Kingdom	August 16, 1993	CD	Virgin	
Australia	September 27, 1993	CD; cassette	Virgin	
Japan	October 20, 1993	CD	Virgin	
