= Video Retrospective =

Video by Lenny Kravitz
- Released: November 25, 1991 (United States)
- Recorded: 1989–1991 (United States)
- Genre: Video collection, live (rock, hard rock, soul, R&B, gospel)
- Length: 55 mins
- Label: Virgin Records America
- Producer: Lenny Kravitz

Lenny Kravitz chronology
Video Retrospective (1991)	Lenny Kravitz: Alive From Planet Earth (1994)

Video Retrospective is the first video album by American rock singer-songwriter Lenny Kravitz, released on November 25, 1991, in VHS format by Virgin Records America due to the success of his second album Mama Said. The album contains all of Kravitz's first music videos filmed from 1989 to 1991 from his first two albums, Let Love Rule and Mama Said.

== Video content ==
1. "Let Love Rule"
2. "Mr. Cab Driver"
3. "I Build This Garden For Us"
4. "Be"
5. "Always on the Run" (feat. Slash)
6. "It Ain't Over 'Til It's Over"
7. "Stand by My Woman"
8. "Stop Draggin' Around"
9. "More Than Anything in this World" (Live)
