= Rock and Roll Is Dead =

1995 single by Lenny Kravitz

Single by Lenny Kravitz

from the album Circus
- B-side: "Another Life"; "Confused"; "Is It Me, Is It You?"
- Released: August 28, 1995
- Length: 3:22
- Label: Virgin
- Songwriter: Lenny Kravitz
- Producer: Lenny Kravitz

Lenny Kravitz singles chronology
"Is There Any Love in Your Heart" (1994)	"Rock and Roll Is Dead" (1995)	"Circus" (1995)

Music video
- "Rock and Roll Is Dead" on YouTube

"Rock and Roll Is Dead" is a song by American musician Lenny Kravitz, released in August 1995 by Virgin Records, as the first single from his fourth album, Circus (1995). The song, both written and produced by Kravitz, became a top-20 hit in Canada, Finland, New Zealand, and Spain, but it underperformed in the United States, peaking at numbers 75 and 80 on the US Billboard Hot 100 and Cash Box Top 100 charts. The accompanying music video was storyboarded by Andrew Trovaioli and directed by Ruvén Afanador. It shows Kravitz performing the song with his band, as well as Kravitz with visual artistic related backgrounds. Kravitz was nominated for a Grammy Award for Best Male Rock Vocal Performance for the song in 1996.

== Content ==
Kravitz told on the meaning of "Rock and Roll Is Dead":

That song was completely misunderstood. A lot of people don't take [the song] that one layer deeper--they hear the title and chorus and take it at face value. They think I'm being serious when actually I'm a very big clown. But you have to know me to see that. I'm constantly cracking up and cracking everybody else around me up. People see my photos and think I labor over my image and I'm this cool, brooding artist. But I'm just having fun with it.

== Critical reception ==
Everett True from Melody Maker said in his review of the song, "F***ing way to go, Lenny!" Pan-European magazine Music & Media wrote, "Borrowing half of the riff from Led Zeppelin's "Heartbreaker" is not exactly the way to back up the statement he's making here. By going retro again, Kravitz reanimates rock totally. DJ Hans Van Rijn at Danish radio station The Voice/Copenhagen said, "As rock is still very big in Scandinavia, it will be a big radio hit. It's typical of him, the way it's structured. Although playable in all day slots, in the evening it will do best on EHR stations which pretend to cater to youth." Paul Moody from NME felt it "could've been a classic opener" of the album, noting that it "is the riff from 'Are You Gonna...' played backwards".

== Chart performance ==
The song reached number 75 on the US Billboard Hot 100, number 80 on the US Cash Box Top 100 and number 22 on the UK Singles Chart. It was a top-10 hit in Finland, New Zealand and Spain, reaching numbers 10, eight, and five, respectively. In Canada, the song reached number 16. Elsewhere, the song reached the top 40 in Australia, the Netherlands, and Switzerland.

== Track listings ==
- US and Canadian CD single; US cassette single
1. "Rock and Roll Is Dead" – 3:22
2. "Another Life" – 3:59
3. "Are You Gonna Go My Way" (live) – 4:00
- UK CD and 10-inch single
1. "Rock and Roll Is Dead" – 3:22
2. "Another Life" – 4:21
3. "Confused" – 6:48
4. "Is It Me, Is It You?" – 3:54
- UK cassette single and European CD single
1. "Rock and Roll Is Dead" – 3:22
2. "Another Life" – 4:21
- Japanese mini-CD single
1. "Rock and Roll Is Dead" – 3:24
2. "God Is Love" – 4:26

== Charts ==
Chart (1995)	Peak position
Australia (ARIA)	26
Canada Top Singles (RPM)	16
Canada Rock/Alternative (RPM)	3
Europe (Eurochart Hot 100)	31
Europe (European Hit Radio)	14
Finland (Suomen virallinen lista)	10
Iceland (Íslenski Listinn Topp 40)	18
Netherlands (Single Top 100)	40
New Zealand (Recorded Music NZ)	8
Scottish Singles Sales (Official Charts)	23
Spain (AFYVE)	5
Switzerland (Schweizer Hitparade)	24
UK Singles (Official Charts)	22
US Billboard Hot 100	75
US Alternative Airplay (Billboard)	10
US Mainstream Rock Airplay (Billboard)	4
US Cash Box Top 100	80

== Release history ==
Region	Date	Format(s)	Label(s)	Ref.
United Kingdom	August 28, 1995	10-inch vinyl; CD; cassette	Virgin	
Japan	September 6, 1995	Mini-CD	Virgin	
United States	September 12, 1995	Contemporary hit radio	Virgin	
