= Are You Gonna Go My Way =

Studio album by Lenny Kravitz
- Released: March 9, 1993
- Recorded: 1992–1993
- Studio: Waterfront Recording Studios
- Genres: Rock; hard rock; blues rock; soul
- Length: 46:14
- Label: Virgin
- Producer: Lenny Kravitz

Lenny Kravitz chronology
Mama Said (1991)	Are You Gonna Go My Way (1993)	Circus (1995)

Singles from Are You Gonna Go My Way
- 1. "Are You Gonna Go My Way" Released: February 8, 1993; 2. "Believe" Released: May 10, 1993; 3. "Heaven Help" Released: August 16, 1993; 4. "Is There Any Love in Your Heart" Released: November 22, 1993

Professional ratings
Review scores
Source	Rating
AllMusic	4.5/5 stars
American Songwriter	3.5/5 stars
Chicago Tribune	3.5/4 stars
Robert Christgau	(dud)
Entertainment Weekly	B
Los Angeles Times	2.5/4 stars
Music Week	4/5 stars
PopMatters	5/10
Record Collector	3/5 stars
Rolling Stone	3/5 stars
The Rolling Stone Album Guide	3/5 stars
Select	3/5

Are You Gonna Go My Way is the third studio album by American singer Lenny Kravitz, released on March 9, 1993, by Virgin Records. It was recorded at Waterfront Studios, Hoboken, New Jersey, by Henry Hirsch. It became Kravitz's first top 20 album on the United States Billboard 200, and his first number-one album in both Australia and the United Kingdom, achieving worldwide success that helped to establish his popularity as a performer.

== Album information ==
The album had a good reception by fans and music critics and it is still considered one of Kravitz's best works.

Musically, it contained songs inspired by classic rock artists such as Jimi Hendrix, the Beatles, Curtis Mayfield, Sly and Robbie, and Prince.

Additional guitars were contributed by Craig Ross.

== Singles ==
"Are You Gonna Go My Way" was released as the lead single. The song peaked at number one on the Australian Singles Chart, and also peaked at number one on the US Mainstream Rock chart, becoming his first number-one single in both countries, while it peaked at number 2 on the Hot Modern Rock Tracks. It was only released for airplay in the US and therefore did not chart on the Hot 100, but was a worldwide hit, peaking at number 4 in both the United Kingdom and France. The song is not only considered to be one of Kravitz's greatest hits as an artist, but also as one of the biggest anthems of the 1990s. Appears in the video games Gran Turismo 3: A-Spec (in a GT Remix) and Guitar Hero World Tour as well as Guitar Hero Live.

"Believe" was the second single from the album. It is a rock ballad that speaks of faith and freedom. The song was another major success from the album, peaking at number 60 on the Billboard Hot 100, number 15 on the US Mainstream Rock chart, number 10 on the Hot Modern Rock Tracks, number 30 on the UK, and number 8 in Australia.

"Heaven Help", the third single from the album, is an R&B and soul song. It originally entered at number 92 on the Billboard Hot 100 but later peaked at number 80, being charted as a double A-side single along with "Spinning Around Over You". The double A-side format also peaked at number 92 on the Hot R&B/Hip-Hop Songs, while in the United Kingdom, it became Kravitz's second top 20 single from the album, reaching number 20.

"Is There Any Love in Your Heart" was released as the final single from the album. It peaked at number 19 on the Hot Mainstream Rock Tracks chart, number 52 in the UK, and number 32 in Australia.

"Spinning Around Over You" charted as a double A-side single along with "Heaven Help", peaking at number 80 on the Billboard Hot 100 and number 37 on the Hot Mainstream Rock tracks chart. The single was originally featured on the soundtrack to the film Reality Bites and was featured on the album as a bonus track, thus being the final single from the album.

== Chart performance ==
Are You Gonna Go My Way has been very successful not only in the United States, but also worldwide, particularly in the major markets of Europe and South America. It reached number 12 on the Billboard 200 and number one on the UK Albums Chart and the Australian Albums Chart. As of March 2008, the album has sold 2.2 million units in the US.

The title track has been considered one of Kravitz's signature songs and was nominated for two Grammy Awards. It was also voted in at number 28 in Triple J's Hottest 100 of 1993, an Australian music poll run by the radio station Triple J.

== Track listing ==
=== Original edition ===
1. "Are You Gonna Go My Way" (Lenny Kravitz, Craig Ross) – 3:31
2. "Believe" (Kravitz, Henry Hirsch) – 4:50
3. "Come on and Love Me" (Kravitz) – 3:52
4. "Heaven Help" (Gerry DeVeaux, Terry Britten) – 3:10
5. "Just Be a Woman" (Kravitz) – 3:50
6. "Is There Any Love in Your Heart" (Kravitz, Ross) – 3:39
7. "Black Girl" (Kravitz) – 3:42
8. "My Love" (Kravitz, Ross) – 3:50
9. "Sugar" (Kravitz) – 4:00
10. "Sister" (Kravitz) – 7:02
11. "Eleutheria" (Kravitz) – 4:48

=== Vinyl edition bonus CD track listing ===
1. "Ascension" (Kravitz, Hirsch) – 3:45
2. "Brother" (Kravitz) – 4:16
3. "Good Lovin'" (DeVeaux, Britten) – 3:34
4. "Someone Like You" (Kravitz, Ross, Hirsch) – 4:14
5. "All My Life" (Kravitz) – 6:24
6. "Spinning Around Over U" (Kravitz, Ross) – 3:35
7. "For the First Time" (Kravitz) – 3:38
8. "Lonely Rainbows" (Kravitz, Hirsch) – 2:26

=== 20th anniversary edition bonus tracks ===
Disc one

Bonus Tracks (The B-Sides)

12. "Spinning Around Over You" (Kravitz, Ross) – 3:35
13. "Ascension" (Kravitz, Hirsch) – 3:44
14. "All My Life" (Kravitz) – 6:25
15. "Brother" (Kravitz) – 4:18
16. "Someone Like You" (Kravitz, Ross, Hirsch) – 4:15
17. "For the First Time" (Kravitz) – 3:41
18. "B-Side Blues" (Kravitz) – 3:32

Disc two
The Acoustic Versions

1. "Believe" (acoustic version) (Kravitz, Hirsch) – 4:07
2. "Sister" (acoustic version) (Kravitz) – 6:07
3. "Heaven Help" (acoustic version) (DeVeaux, Britten) – 3:58

Work in Progress: Demos & Outtakes

4. "Work Like the Devil" (Kravitz) – 4:46
5. "Feeling Alright" (instrumental) (Kravitz) – 3:49
6. "Getting Out (Will You Marry Me)" (Kravitz, Ross) – 4:16
7. "Good Lovin'" (Kravitz) – 3:34
8. "Blood/Papa (A Long and Sad Goodbye)" (instrumental) (Ross, Hirsch) – 10:59
9. "Early Morning Blues" (instrumental) (Kravitz) – 4:33

The Vanessa Paradis Demos

10. "I May Not Be a Star (Light Piece for Vanessa)" (Kravitz) – 4:43
11. "Travelogue (Your Love Has Got a Handle On My Mind)" – 4:21
12. "Lonely Rainbows" (Kravitz, Hirsch) – 2:26

Bonus Interview

13. "BBC Interview with Mick Wilkojc" – 15:28

== Personnel ==
Credits adapted from the album's liner notes.

Musicians

- Lenny Kravitz – lead and background vocals, electric guitar (tracks 3, 7, 9, 11), electric guitar solo (tracks 7, 9, 11), acoustic guitar (tracks 4, 5, 10), bass (tracks 2, 3, 7, 9, 11), drums (tracks 1–3, 5–11), Mellotron (track 5), chimes and orchestral arrangement (track 2), string arrangement (tracks 5, 9, 10), horn arrangement (tracks 9, 10)
- Craig Ross – electric guitar (tracks 1–3, 6–11), acoustic guitar (track 2)
- Henry Hirsch – bass (tracks 4, 10), piano and ARP string ensemble (track 4), Wurlitzer organ and orchestral arrangement (track 2)
- Tony Breit – bass (tracks 1, 5, 6, 8)
- Dave Domanich – drums and electric guitar (track 4)
- Michael Hunter – French horn (track 2), flugelhorn (tracks 9, 10)
- Michael "Ibo" Cooper – Hammond B-3 organ and clavinet (track 11)
- Eric Delente – violin (track 2)
- Soye Kim – violin (tracks 2, 9, 10)
- Robert Lawrence – violin (track 2)
- Sarah Adams – viola (track 2)
- Liuh-Wen Ting – viola (track 2)
- Allen Whear – cello (track 2)
- Frank Murphy – cello (track 2)
- Carolyn Davies Fryer – double bass (track 2)
- Gerry DeVeaux – background vocals (track 4)
- Angie Stone – background vocals (track 4)

Production

- Produced by Lenny Kravitz
- Engineered and mixed by Henry Hirsch
- Assistant engineer – Greg Di Gesu
- Mastered by Greg Calbi at Sterling Sound Studios
- Art direction by Len Peltier
- Design by Jean Krikorian and Len Peltier
- Cover photography by Jean-Baptiste Mondino

== Charts ==
=== Weekly charts ===
Weekly chart performance for Are You Gonna Go My Way
Chart (1993)	Peak position
Australian Albums (ARIA)	1
Austrian Albums (Ö3 Austria)	3
Canada Top Albums/CDs (RPM)	1
Dutch Albums (Album Top 100)	3
Finnish Albums (Suomen virallinen lista)	2
French Albums (SNEP)	4
German Albums (Offizielle Top 100)	7
Japanese Albums (Oricon)	6
New Zealand Albums (RMNZ)	2
Norwegian Albums (VG-lista)	6
Spanish Albums (AFYVE)	14
Swedish Albums (Sverigetopplistan)	5
Swiss Albums (Schweizer Hitparade)	1
UK Albums (Official Charts)	1
US Billboard 200	12

=== Year-end charts ===
Year-end chart performance for Are You Gonna Go My Way
Chart (1993)	Position
Australian Albums (ARIA)	11
Austrian Albums (Ö3 Austria)	13
Canada Top Albums/CDs (RPM)	2
Dutch Albums (Album Top 100)	26
German Albums (Offizielle Top 100)	35
New Zealand Albums (RMNZ)	6
Spanish Albums (AFYVE)	36
Swiss Albums (Schweizer Hitparade)	8
US Billboard 200	37

== Certifications and sales ==
Certifications and sales for Are You Gonna Go My Way
Region	Certification	Certified units/sales
Argentina (CAPIF)	Gold	30,000^{^}
Australia (ARIA)	2× Platinum	140,000^{^}
Canada (Music Canada)	4× Platinum	400,000^{^}
France (SNEP)	Platinum	300,000^{*}
Germany (BVMI)	Gold	250,000^{^}
Japan (RIAJ)	Platinum	200,000^{^}
Netherlands (NVPI)	Platinum	100,000^{^}
New Zealand (RMNZ)	Platinum	15,000^{^}
Norway (IFPI Norway)	Gold	25,000^{*}
Spain (Promusicae)	Gold	50,000^{^}
Sweden (GLF)	Gold	50,000^{^}
Switzerland (IFPI Switzerland)	Platinum	50,000^{^}
United Kingdom (BPI)	Platinum	300,000^{^}
United States (RIAA)	2× Platinum	2,160,000
^{*} Sales figures based on certification alone.^{^} Shipments figures based on certification alone.

== Sources ==
- Are You Gonna Go My Way on cduniverse.com
