= Everyday (Angie Stone song) =

Single by Angie Stone

from the album Black Diamond
- Released: 2000
- Length: 3:28
- Label: Arista
- Songwriters: Angie Stone; D'Angelo
- Producer: Russell Elevado

Angie Stone singles chronology
"Life Story" (2000)	"Everyday" (2000)	"U Make My Sun Shine" (2001)

"Everyday" is a song by American recording artist Angie Stone. It was written by Stone along with D'Angelo and first appeared on the soundtrack to the 1997 action comedy film Money Talks. Produced by Russell Elevado, it was instrumental in securing Stone a recording deal with the US division of Arista Records. "Everyday" was later included on her debut studio album, Black Diamond (1999).

== Background ==
"Everyday" was written by Stone along with D'Angelo, while production was helmed by Russell Elevado. In 1997, the song was featured on the soundtrack to the 1997 film Money Talks. Though Stone had signed with the United Kingdom division of Arista Records earlier that year, the song prompted the label's then A&R manager Peter Edge to bring Stone to label head Clive Davis's attention, who was impressed by "her voice and deep emotional connection to traditional soul music" and signed her to his US division. "Everyday" was eventually included on her solo debut album, Black Diamond (1999).

== Chart performance ==
In the United Kingdom, "Everyday" was released by Arista Records as a single from the Money Talks soundtrack in fall 1997. The song debuted and peaked at number 11 in the week ending November 15, 1997. In the United States, "Everyday" was released as the album's third single in the first quarter of 2000. It peaked at number 52 on the US Hot R&B/Hip-Hop Songs chart in the week of May 6, 2000. The same week, it also reached number 21 on the US Adult R&B Songs chart.

== Music video ==
A music video for "Everyday" was directed by Canadian film maker Director X.

== Track listings ==
CD single
No.	Title	Writer(s)	Producer(s)	Length
1.	"Everyday" (US radio edit)	Stone; D'Angelo	Russell Elevado	3:58
2.	"Everyday" (Full Crew Rap Club mix)	Stone; D'Angelo	Elevado; Full Crew^{[a]}	3:36
3.	"Everyday" (Bass remix)	Stone; D'Angelo	Elevado	4:14
4.	"My Lovin' Will Give You Something"	David Gamson; Gerry DeVeaux; Melvin Ragin	DeVeaux	4:34

20th Anniversary Edition – digital single
No.	Title	Writer(s)	Producer(s)	Length
1.	"Everyday" (7" version)	Stone; D'Angelo	Elevado	4:32
2.	"Everyday" (album version)	Stone; D'Angelo	Elevado	3:29
3.	"Everyday" (The Neptunes Remix featuring Pusha T)	Stone; D'Angelo; Terrence Thornton	Elevado; The Neptunes^{[a]}	4:20
4.	"Everyday" (The Neptunes Remix)	Stone; D'Angelo	Elevado; The Neptunes^{[a]}	3:22
5.	"Everyday" (Mike City Remix)	Stone; D'Angelo	Elevado; Mike City^{[a]}	3:58
6.	"Everyday" (Suli and Stef bass remix)	Stone; D'Angelo	Elevado; Suli and Stef^{[a]}; Mad Snake^{[a]}	4:49
7.	"Everyday" (Full Crew Rap Club mix)	Stone; D'Angelo	Elevado; Full Crew^{[a]}	3:52
8.	"Everyday" (Full Crew Soul Town mix)	Stone; D'Angelo	Elevado; Full Crew^{[a]}	4:23

Notes

- ^{^a} signifies additional producer(s)

== Charts ==
Weekly performance for "Everyday"
Chart (1997–2000)	Peak position
UK Singles (OCC)	80
UK Hip Hop/R&B (OCC)	11
US Hot R&B/Hip-Hop Songs (Billboard)	52
