= Circus (Lenny Kravitz song) =

1995 single by Lenny Kravitz

Single by Lenny Kravitz

from the album Circus
- Released: December 11, 1995
- Genre: Rock
- Length: 4:48
- Label: Virgin
- Songwriters: Terry Britten; Gerry DeVeaux; Lenny Kravitz
- Producer: Lenny Kravitz

Lenny Kravitz singles chronology
"Rock and Roll Is Dead" (1995)	"Circus" (1995)	"Can't Get You Off My Mind" (1995)

Music video
- "Circus" on YouTube

"Circus" is a song co-written and performed by American singer Lenny Kravitz and released on December 11, 1995, by Virgin Records as the second single from his fourth studio album, Circus (1995). There were two music videos produced for the song: one directed by Ruvén Afanador and the other by Martyn Atkins. Kravitz explained to Billboard, "it gets more like a circus with all this suff—management people, fans, bankers, investment people. It's like, My God! What happened? It gets harder to be yourself."

== Critical reception ==
Steve Baltin from Cash Box described "Circus" as "a slow blues-based rocker with a killer chorus, a smoking guitar solo near the end and a great fade out. Despite all that, it's not immediately obvious what radio formats will embrace this heavy single." John Perry from NME commented, "Here's Lenny the Krav with another of his homages to the loon pant. Instead of his usual pillion ride on Jimi's big Chopper, this time the Kravster has opted to paint himself a rather weak shade of Blue Öyster Cult." Mark Kemp of Rolling Stone stated, "In the title track of Lenny Kravitz's new album, the singer struggles with the dictates of reality that come to bear on fantasy. "Welcome to the real world", he sings to himself. But in the real world according to Kravitz, rock stars still flash diamond rings and coke spoons, and bumper-sticker platitudes like god is love still soften the blows of the real real world."

== Charts ==
Chart (1995–1996)	Peak position
Canada Top Singles (RPM)	85
Scottish Singles Sales (Official Charts)	55
UK Singles (Official Charts)	54

== Release history ==
Region	Date	Format(s)	Label(s)	Ref.
United States	November 6, 1995	Rock radio	Virgin	
United Kingdom	December 11, 1995	10-inch vinyl	Virgin	
