= Fly Away (Lenny Kravitz song) =

1998 single by Lenny Kravitz

- Standard non-US artwork

Single by Lenny Kravitz

from the album 5
- B-side: "Believe" (live acoustic)
- Released: May 11, 1998
- Genre: Funk rock; alternative rock; pop rock
- Length: 3:41 (album version); 3:06 (radio edit)
- Label: Virgin
- Songwriter: Lenny Kravitz
- Producer: Lenny Kravitz

Lenny Kravitz singles chronology
"I Belong to You" (1998)	"Fly Away" (1998)	"American Woman" (1999)

Music video
- "Fly Away" on YouTube

"Fly Away" is a song by American singer Lenny Kravitz. It was released as the fourth single from his fifth studio album, 5 (1998). Released to radio on May 11, 1998, "Fly Away" peaked at number 12 on the US Billboard Hot 100, topped the charts of Iceland and the United Kingdom, and peaked within the top 10 of the charts of several other countries, including Australia, Canada, Ireland, and New Zealand. The song won a Grammy Award for Best Male Rock Performance in 1999.

== Background ==
"Fly Away" emerged from Lenny Kravitz testing an amp that was brought to the studio. After plugging in the available guitar, Kravitz started playing the song, stating, "I was listening to the way different chords were ringing, just moving between A, C, G and D, and the next thing I knew I was telling the engineer to hook up the mics and record."

By the time he wrote "Fly Away", Kravitz had already turned in the completed album 5 to Virgin Records, and he considered releasing the song as a B-side. However, after playing the song for a friend, they responded, "If you don't put it on the album, I'm gonna be so pissed off at you." After Kravitz contacted his label about the inclusion of the song, they were reluctant, but he sent them the song anyway. Upon hearing the track, they added it to the album.

== Critical reception ==
Birmingham Evening Mail commented, "If you watch TV you'll already be familiar with this—it's the song from the Peugeot TV ad which seems to have rarely been off the screen during the past few weeks. It's about time Kravitz returned to the big time—remember when he sold out the NEC in '91?—and this could see him back in the chart big time."

== Chart performance ==
"Fly Away" reached number 12 on the Billboard Hot 100 and topped both the Mainstream Rock and Modern Rock Tracks charts. On Canada's RPM Top Singles chart, "Fly Away" reached number three and stayed in the top 20 for six weeks. Outside North America, the song reached number one in Iceland and on the UK Singles Chart; its success in the UK is attributed to its appearance in a television advertisement for the Peugeot 206 Supermini car. In Australia and New Zealand, "Fly Away" peaked at number eight and was certified Gold in both countries. The song helped to expand the success of his fifth studio album, 5, in Europe and earned Kravitz a Grammy Award in 1999 for Best Male Rock Performance, his first of four consecutive wins in this category.

== Music video ==
The music video for the single was directed by American director Paul Hunter. It features Kravitz and his band playing in a club, surrounded by a crowd dancing to the song, with some of them having fun and others making out. Special effects were added to the video to make it look beat up and grainy. A girl in the crowd is briefly shown topless several times during the video with her breasts blurred out. The video is featured on the DVD for Kravitz's 2000 Greatest Hits album tour edition.

Kravitz also appears in a 2010 video in which he joined the Voice of Praise Choir from the First Baptist Church of Lewisville, Texas, as they performed "Fly Away" on a street in New Orleans.

== Track listings ==
International CD and cassette single

1. "Fly Away" – 3:41
2. "Fly Away" (live acoustic) – 4:03
3. "Believe" (live acoustic) – 5:14

European CD single

1. "Fly Away"
2. "Believe" (live acoustic)

French CD single

1. "Fly Away" – 3:41
2. "Fly Away" (live acoustic) – 4:03

== Charts ==
=== Weekly charts ===
Chart (1998–1999)	Peak position
Australia (ARIA)	8
Austria (Ö3 Austria Top 40)	11
Belgium (Ultratip Bubbling Under Flanders)	11
Canada Top Singles (RPM)	3
Europe (Eurochart Hot 100)	5
France (SNEP)	56
Germany (GfK)	15
Iceland (Íslenski Listinn Topp 40)	1
Ireland (IRMA)	5
Netherlands (Dutch Top 40 Tipparade)	2
Netherlands (Single Top 100)	49
New Zealand (Recorded Music NZ)	8
Scottish Singles Sales (Official Charts)	3
Sweden (Sverigetopplistan)	22
Switzerland (Schweizer Hitparade)	19
UK Singles (Official Charts)	1
US Billboard Hot 100	12
US Adult Alternative Airplay (Billboard)	17
US Adult Pop Airplay (Billboard)	8
US Alternative Airplay (Billboard)	1
US Mainstream Rock (Billboard)	1
US Pop Airplay (Billboard)	7

Chart (2019)	Peak position
Poland Airplay (ZPAV)	61

=== Year-end charts ===
Chart (1998)	Position
US Mainstream Rock Tracks (Billboard)	21
US Modern Rock Tracks (Billboard)	39

Chart (1999)	Position
Australia (ARIA)	52
Brazil (Crowley)	41
Canada Top Singles (RPM)	79
Europe (Eurochart Hot 100)	66
Germany (Media Control)	61
UK Singles (OCC)	50
UK Airplay (Music Week)	34
US Billboard Hot 100	29
US Adult Top 40 (Billboard)	19
US Mainstream Rock Tracks (Billboard)	5
US Mainstream Top 40 (Billboard)	27
US Modern Rock Tracks (Billboard)	11

Year-end chart performance
Chart (2025)	Position
Argentina Anglo Airplay (Monitor Latino)	95

== Certifications ==
Region	Certification	Certified units/sales
Australia (ARIA)	Gold	35,000^{^}
Brazil (Pro-Música Brasil)	Platinum	60,000^{*}
Italy (FIMI)	Gold	50,000^{‡}
New Zealand (RMNZ)	Gold	5,000^{*}
Spain (Promusicae)	Gold	30,000^{‡}
United Kingdom (BPI)	Platinum	556,000
^{*} Sales figures based on certification alone.^{^} Shipments figures based on certification alone.^{‡} Sales+streaming figures based on certification alone.

== Release history ==
Region	Date	Format(s)	Label(s)	Ref.
United States	May 11, 1998	Active rock radio	Virgin	
United States	October 20, 1998	Contemporary hit radio	Virgin	
United States	November 9, 1998	CD	Virgin	
United Kingdom	February 8, 1999	CD; cassette	Virgin	

== In popular culture ==
From 2002 to 2003, the song was featured in MSN commercials.

Internet personality Neil Cicierega made a lyric video of the song with the vocal tracks heavily altered, which received coverage from several websites. The song has also been used in a tourism campaign for The Bahamas, featuring Kravitz who is of Bahamian descent.

In August 2024, Kravitz and American rapper Quavo teamed up for a remix of the song, simply titled "Fly". This remix was featured in Fortnite Festival and Madden NFL 25.

=== Charts ===
==== Weekly charts ====
Weekly chart performance for "Fly Away" (Quavo Remix)
Chart (2024)	Peak position
Lithuania Airplay (TopHit)	12
Poland (Polish Airplay Top 100)	39
San Marino Airplay (SMRTV Top 50)	27
US Rhythmic Airplay (Billboard)	36

==== Monthly charts ====
Monthly chart performance for "Fly Away" (Quavo Remix)
Chart (2024)	Peak position
Lithuania Airplay (TopHit)	56
