= Life Story (song) =

Single by Angie Stone

from the album Black Diamond
- Released: April 3, 2000
- Length: 4:07
- Label: Arista
- Songwriter(s): Gerry DeVeaux; Craig Ross
- Producer(s): Gerry DeVeaux

Angie Stone singles chronology
"No More Rain (In This Cloud)" (1999)	"Life Story" (2000)	"Everyday" (2000)

"Life Story" is a song by American recording artist Angie Stone. It was written by Gerry DeVeaux and Craig Ross and originally recorded for DeVox's collaborative album DeVox featuring Angie B. Stone (1996). A slightly remixed version of the song was later included on Stone's solo debut album with Arista Records, Black Diamond (1999), featuring additional production from Cutfather & Joe.

Released in 2000 as the second international single from Black Diamond, "Life Story" peaked at number 22 on the UK Singles Chart number six on the UK R&B Singles chart, while reaching the Dutch and German Singles Charts. Mixmag included the Booker T Vocal Mix of "Life Story" in their list of "16 of the Best Uplifting Vocal Garage Tracks".

== Track listings ==
All tracks written by Gerry DeVeaux and Craig Ross.

CD single
No.	Title	Producer(s)	Length
1.	"Life Story" (Radio Edit)	DeVeaux; Cutfather & Joe^{[a]}	3:59
2.	"Life Story" (Club 69 Future Mix Radio Edit)	DeVeaux; Peter Rauhofer^{[a]}	3:36
3.	"Life Story" (Full Crew Jazz Hop Mix)	DeVeaux; Full Crew^{[a]}	4:14
4.	"Life Story" (Devox Original Version 1)	DeVeaux	3:49
5.	"Life Story" (Club 69 Future Dub)	DeVeaux; Rauhofer^{[a]}	6:16

== Credits and personnel ==
Credits lifted from the liner notes of Black Diamond.

- Cutfather & Joe – additional producer (radio edit)
- Gerry DeVeaux – producer, writer
- Angie Stone – vocalist
- Craig Ross – writer

== Charts ==
Weekly chart performance for "Life Story"
Chart (2000)	Peak position
Belgium (Ultratip Bubbling Under Flanders)	18
Germany (GfK)	83
Netherlands (Single Top 100)	88
Scotland (OCC)	39
UK Singles (OCC)	22
UK Dance (OCC)	20
UK Hip Hop/R&B (OCC)	6

== Release history ==
Release dates and formats for "Life Story"
Region	Date	Format(s)	Label(s)	Ref.
United Kingdom	April 3, 2000	CD single	Arista	
