= I Belong to You (Lenny Kravitz song) =

1998 single by Lenny Kravitz

- Standard non-US artwork

Single by Lenny Kravitz

from the album 5
- Released: August 3, 1998
- Genre: Rock; pop
- Length: 4:17
- Label: Virgin
- Songwriter: Lenny Kravitz
- Producer: Lenny Kravitz

Lenny Kravitz singles chronology
"Thinking of You" (1998)	"I Belong to You" (1998)	"Fly Away" (1998)

Music video
- "I Belong To You" on YouTube

"I Belong to You" is a song by American rock musician Lenny Kravitz, released in August 1998 as the album's third single from his fifth studio album, 5. The song peaked at number 15 on the US Billboard Adult Top 40 and number 71 on the Billboard Hot 100.

== Critical reception ==
Carla Hay of AXS stated, "This calypso-inspired rock/pop ballad is all kinds of laid-back and sexy. One of the singles from Kravitz’s 1998 album, 5, 'I Belong to You' is one of his most sensual songs."

== Music video ==
The music video was directed by Mark Seliger and Fred Woodward. It is set in the Bahamas, from where the family of Lenny Kravitz's mother, Roxie Roker, hailed. It visually expanded the reggae influence of the song. Kravitz was filmed singing and dancing among the people, also walking and biking along the streets. Another scene from the video features Kravitz singing while submerged up to his stomach in the ocean.

== Track listings ==
The single includes several remixes for his previous single "If You Can't Say No".

European maxi-CD single

1. "I Belong to You" – 4:17
2. "If You Can't Say No" (Flunky in the Attic mix) – 5:16
3. "If You Can't Say No" (Just Say No mix) – 6:00
4. "If You Can't Say No" (BT Twilo dub) – 8:02
5. "If You Can't Say No" (Dallas Austin mix) – 4:45

UK CD single

1. "I Belong to You" – 4:17
2. "If You Can't Say No" (Flunky in the Attic mix) – 5:16
3. "If You Can't Say No" (BT Twilo dub) – 8:02

== Charts ==
=== Weekly charts ===
Chart (1998–2000)	Peak position
Belgium (Ultratip Bubbling Under Flanders)	14
Belgium (Ultratop 50 Wallonia)	32
Europe (Eurochart Hot 100)	84
France (SNEP)	24
Germany (GfK)	81
Greece (IFPI)	7
Iceland (Íslenski Listinn Topp 40)	3
Italy Airplay (Music & Media)	1
Netherlands (Single Top 100)	42
Scottish Singles Sales (Official Charts)	99
UK Singles (Official Charts)	75
US Billboard Hot 100	71
US Adult Pop Airplay (Billboard)	15
US Pop Airplay (Billboard)	36

=== Year-end charts ===
Chart (1998)	Position
Iceland (Íslenski Listinn Topp 40)	42

Chart (2000)	Position
US Adult Top 40 (Billboard)	47

== Release history ==
Region	Date	Format(s)	Label(s)	Ref.
Europe	August 3, 1998	CD	Virgin	
United Kingdom	September 28, 1998	CD; cassette	Virgin	
United States	January 18, 2000	Contemporary hit radio	Virgin	
