= Circus (Lenny Kravitz album) =

Studio album by Lenny Kravitz
- Released: September 12, 1995
- Recorded: 1994–1995
- Studios: Chateau Des Conde, France; Compass Point Studios, Nassau, Bahamas; and Waterfront Studios, Hoboken, New Jersey
- Genres: Rock; hard rock; pop rock; soul; psychedelic pop
- Length: 51:04
- Label: Virgin
- Producer: Lenny Kravitz

Lenny Kravitz chronology
Are You Gonna Go My Way (1993)	Circus (1995)	5 (1998)

Singles from Circus
- 1. "Rock and Roll Is Dead" Released: August 28, 1995; 2. "Circus" Released: December 11, 1995; 3. "Can't Get You Off My Mind" Released: February 19, 1996

Professional ratings
Review scores
Source	Rating
AllMusic	2/5 stars
Cash Box	(favorable)
Robert Christgau	(dud)
Encyclopedia of Popular Music	2/5 stars
Entertainment Weekly	C−
NME	7/10
Rolling Stone	3/5 stars
Select	2/5 medals

Circus is the fourth studio album by American rock musician Lenny Kravitz, released in 1995 by Virgin Records. It reached number 10 on the US Billboard 200 and number five on the UK Albums Chart, becoming Kravitz's first top 10 album in the US and second in the UK.

== Background ==
The album deals with different topics, such as rock star lifestyles on "Rock and Roll Is Dead" and religion on "God Is Love" and "The Resurrection". Kravitz is quoted as saying that the making of the album was a very tedious process—he was unhappy with the music business at the time, and his mother's illness was also weighing on his mind. The recording locations were Chateau Des Conde, France; Compass Point Studios, Nassau, Bahamas; and Waterfront Studios, Hoboken, NJ.

== Reception ==
Rob Wagner of The Tech stated, "Though Circus is a bit of a rip-off album, it could be justified. Kravitz believes that rock and roll is dead, so he could be trying to revive it by copying past rock and roll songs that worked. Two things are for sure: Circus definitely sounds better than his last album, and it is infinitely better than any inane drivel released by Live. Kravitz avoids the characteristically annoying sound he inflicted on people in Are You Gonna Go My Way. He avoids cheesy '70s style Muzak orchestrations, and, most of the time, he avoids incessantly singing, "Ooooooh!" Mark Kemp of Rolling Stone stated, "Whereas Kravitz's last album at least offered several possible new paths for him, Circus finds him falling back on the most transparent one. Whether it's a calculated attempt to cash in on arena rock while it's all the rage again or an unshakable desire to re-create the 70s-style rock star in his own image is hard to say. What's clear is that Kravitz is not the slick reassembler of funk, R&B, and classic rock that he was two years ago."

== Track listing ==
1. "Rock and Roll Is Dead" (Kravitz) – 3:23
2. "Circus" (Gerry DeVeaux, Terry Britten, Kravitz) – 4:48
3. "Beyond the 7th Sky" (Craig Ross, Kravitz) – 4:54
4. "Tunnel Vision" (Kravitz) – 4:19
5. "Can't Get You Off My Mind" (Kravitz) – 4:34
6. "Magdalene" (Kravitz) – 3:48
7. "God Is Love" (Kravitz, Henry Hirsch) – 4:26
8. "Thin Ice" (Ross, Kravitz) – 5:33
9. "Don't Go and Put a Bullet in Your Head" (Kravitz) – 4:22
10. "In My Life Today" (Ross, Kravitz) – 6:29
11. "The Resurrection" (Ross, Kravitz) – 4:28
12. "Another Life" [Japan bonus] – 3:59

== Personnel ==
- Bass by Henry Hirsch for track 3 and Tony Breit for tracks 2
- Electric guitar by Craig Ross on tracks 2, 3, 5, 6, 7, 8 and 10
- Electric piano by Henry Hirsch on track 11
- Mastered by Greg Calbi at Masterdisk
- Mixed by David Domanich, Henry Hirsch and Lenny Kravitz
- Recorded by Henry Hirsch at Waterfront Studios, NJ; Chateau Des Conde, France and Compass Point Studios, Bahamas
- Art direction by Len Peltier
- Artwork design by Len Peltier and Steve Gerdes
- Photography by Ruvén Afanador

== Charts and certifications ==
=== Weekly charts ===
Weekly chart performance for Circus
Chart (1995)	Peak position
Australian Albums (ARIA)	2
Austrian Albums (Ö3 Austria)	3
Belgian Albums (Ultratop Flanders)	3
Belgian Albums (Ultratop Wallonia)	14
Dutch Albums (Album Top 100)	1
European Albums (European Top 100 Albums)	2
Finnish Albums (Suomen virallinen lista)	7
French Albums (SNEP)	7
German Albums (Offizielle Top 100)	8
Japanese Albums (Oricon)	1
New Zealand Albums (RMNZ)	4
Norwegian Albums (VG-lista)	7
Scottish Albums (Official Charts)	18
Spanish Albums (AFYVE)	9
Swedish Albums (Sverigetopplistan)	7
Swiss Albums (Schweizer Hitparade)	1
UK Albums (Official Charts)	5
US Billboard 200	10

=== Year-end charts ===
1995 year-end chart performance for Circus
Chart (1995)	Position
Austrian Albums (Ö3 Austria)	46
Canada Top Albums/CDs (RPM)	62
Dutch Albums (Album Top 100)	79
European Albums (European Top 100 Albums)	82

=== Certifications and sales ===
Certifications and sales for Circus
Region	Certification	Certified units/sales
Argentina (CAPIF)	Gold	30,000^{^}
France (SNEP)	Gold	100,000^{*}
Japan (RIAJ)	Platinum	200,000^{^}
Netherlands (NVPI)	Gold	50,000^{^}
New Zealand (RMNZ)	Gold	7,500^{^}
Spain (Promusicae)	Gold	50,000^{^}
Switzerland (IFPI Switzerland)	Gold	25,000^{^}
United Kingdom (BPI)	Gold	100,000^{^}
United States (RIAA)	Gold	527,000
^{*} Sales figures based on certification alone.^{^} Shipments figures based on certification alone.
