= 5 (Lenny Kravitz album) =

Studio album by Lenny Kravitz
- Released: May 12, 1998
- Recorded: October 1997–February 1998
- Studios: Ghetto Lounge Studios and Compass Point Studios
- Genres: Funk rock; psychedelic soul; trip hop
- Length: 66:00 (original); 75:00 (re-release)
- Label: Virgin
- Producer: Lenny Kravitz

Lenny Kravitz chronology
| Circus (1995) | 5 (1998) | Greatest Hits (2000) |

Singles from 5
- 1. "If You Can't Say No" Released: April 20, 1998; 2. "Thinking of You" Released: July 6, 1998; 3. "I Belong to You" Released: August 3, 1998; 4. "Fly Away" Released: November 9, 1998; 5. "American Woman" Released: May 10, 1999; 6. "Black Velveteen" Released: November 29, 1999

Professional ratings
Review scores
| Source | Rating |
|---|---|
| AllMusic | 2.5/5 stars |
| Encyclopedia of Popular Music | 2/5 stars |
| Entertainment Weekly | C |
| NME | 4/10 |
| Robert Christgau | C |
| Rolling Stone | 2/5 stars |
| Spin | 3/10 |

5 is the fifth full-length studio album by American rock musician Lenny Kravitz, released on May 12, 1998, by Virgin Records. The album produced six singles released over the course of 1998 and 1999.

== Writing and recording ==
Pre-production work on 5 commenced during early 1997. It began being recorded in Kravitz' New York carriage house studio in October 1997. Celebrities including Madonna, Chris Rock, Bobby Brown, Marilyn Manson and Gwen Stefani visited this studio during the recording. Later sessions took place at engineer Terry Manning's Compass Point Studios in The Bahamas.

The album contained more of his '70s-inspired songs, funk and soul, mixed with his rock style. In the production of the album, Kravitz worked with digital technology such as synthesizers and tape loops providing the album with a more modern sound. It was his first album to be done using Pro Tools. In a 1998 interview with Audio Technology magazine, Manning said "we recorded the whole album on ProTools, we never went to tape, we just stayed in the digital domain. Which is a different tack for Lenny to take given his retro reputation, but it really worked well." Regarding digital plug-ins, Manning said "that’s one area of ProTools that I’m not wild about. There are some plug-ins that work extremely well, for instance the [Antares] Autotune plug-in is amazing. But for the most part the plug-ins that function like outboard gear – such as compressors, EQ, chorus and flangers – I don’t generally like very much. I think that they have a harsh artificial sound. [Although] I’m not saying we didn’t use any plug-ins."

== Release and commercial performance ==
The album featured such hits as "Fly Away" and "I Belong to You", which helped Kravitz to expand his success in Europe. The album won two Grammy Awards.

5 was re-issued in 1999, including Lenny Kravitz's latest single from the soundtrack of Austin Powers: The Spy Who Shagged Me, "American Woman", plus a bonus track called "Without You"—initially a B-side to the lead single, "If You Can't Say No".

Initially, the album received mediocre reviews by some critics, and its rise to commercial success was quite slow, until it gained traction towards the end of 1998 and throughout 1999 producing a string of worldwide hits and becoming one of the most successful albums of 1999. Despite paling in comparison in US chart position with Kravitz's other albums, it managed to have a remarkably long chart-life, charting for nearly three years straight on the Billboard 200, two of which were spent in the top 100.

The album gained Kravitz multiple awards nominations and gave him his first two Grammy Awards in the Best Male Rock Vocal Performance category for the hits "Fly Away" and "American Woman".

== Critical reception ==
Stephen Thomas Erlewine of AllMusic stated "Without hooks, melodies, and style, Kravitz's Sly, Mayfield, Hendrix, Lennon, and Prince pastiches are a bore. 5 has a few passable cuts, yet it falls short of the quirky hero worship and melodic smarts that made his first three records so enjoyable". Jim Farber of Entertainment Weekly commented "It's useless to keep railing about Kravitz’ endless grave robbing. On 5, he shows no signs of halting his lifts from Sly Stone, Curtis Mayfield, and the Beatles. At least this time he targets some new catalogs (Gary Numan, Depeche Mode)". Robert Christgau wrote "His racially convoluted formalism having long since come clean as a total absence of original ideas, he grabs the brass ring from the back of a tacked-on Guess Who cover best heard on the far more imaginative Austin Powers soundtrack. Lenny, your work here on earth is done". A reviewer of Classic Rock Review added "This winner of two Grammy Awards, successfully found Kravitz both establishing himself as a genuine funk and R&B artist while also advancing his incredibly diverse fusion of rock and soul which he had established early on in his recording career. The result is an accessible and accomplished work that offers an array of sonic candy... While 5 is pretty solid throughout, the second half of the album is where real gems lie with rock, funk and soul musical diversity". Stephen Thompson of The A.V. Club wrote "Kravitz's fifth album—appropriately enough, it's titled 5—has a few exhilarating fragments scattered throughout its 66 minutes. But those moments are too infrequent to be easily extracted... Kravitz's most forgiving fans will appreciate the diversity and sheer volume of 5; everyone else should give it a pass."

== Track listing ==
All tracks are written by Lenny Kravitz, except where noted. All tracks produced by Kravitz.

Standard edition
| No. | Title | Writer(s) | Length |
|---|---|---|---|
| 1. | "Live" | Kravitz; Craig Ross | 5:10 |
| 2. | "Supersoulfighter" | | 4:59 |
| 3. | "I Belong to You" | | 4:17 |
| 4. | "Black Velveteen" | | 4:49 |
| 5. | "If You Can't Say No" | | 5:17 |
| 6. | "Thinking of You" | Kravitz; Lysa Trenier | 6:24 |
| 7. | "Take Time" | | 4:32 |
| 8. | "Fly Away" | | 3:42 |
| 9. | "It's Your Life" | | 5:02 |
| 10. | "Straight Cold Player" | | 4:20 |
| 11. | "Little Girl's Eyes" | | 7:45 |
| 12. | "You're My Flavor" | | 3:48 |
| 13. | "Can We Find a Reason?" | | 6:25 |
| Total length: | | | 66:30 |

1999 re-release bonus tracks
| No. | Title | Writer(s) | Length |
|---|---|---|---|
| 14. | "American Woman" | Burton Cummings; Jim Kale; Garry Peterson; Randy Bachman | 4:24 |
| 15. | "Without You" | | 4:46 |
| Total length: | | | 75:40 |

== Personnel ==
- Lenny Kravitz – vocals, all other instruments
- Craig Ross – electric guitar, slide guitar, keyboards
- Terry Manning – toy piano on "I Belong to You" and Screams on "Straight Cold Player"
- Cindy Blackman – drums on "Straight Cold Player"
- Jack Daley – bass guitar
- Michael Hunter – trumpet
- Harold Todd – saxophone
- George Laks – keyboards
- Alex Alvarez – keyboards
- Stephen Dorff – 'uh' sounds on "American Woman"

Production

- Engineered by Terry Manning except "American Woman" engineered by Matt Knobel
- Recorded by Tom "T-Bone" Edmonds
- Mixed by Manning and Kravitz
- Pro Tools operation by Matt Knobel
- Programming by Kravitz, Knobel, Mark Browne and Eric Rehl
- Horn arrangements by Kravitz, Michael Hunter and Harold Todd
- Art direction and design by Len Peltier
- Photography by Mark Seliger

== Singles ==
- "If You Can't Say No" – No. 48 UK
- "Thinking of You"
- "I Belong to You" – No. 71 US, No. 75 UK
- "Fly Away" – No. 12 US, No. 1 UK
- "American Woman" – No. 49 US
- "Black Velveteen" – No. 83 UK

== Charts ==
=== Weekly charts ===
Weekly chart performance for 5
| Chart (1998) | Peak position |
|---|---|
| Australian Albums (ARIA) | 17 |
| Austrian Albums (Ö3 Austria) | 1 |
| Belgian Albums (Ultratop Flanders) | 15 |
| Belgian Albums (Ultratop Wallonia) | 24 |
| Canada Top Albums/CDs (RPM) | 20 |
| Dutch Albums (Album Top 100) | 8 |
| Finnish Albums (Suomen virallinen lista) | 23 |
| French Albums (SNEP) | 9 |
| German Albums (Offizielle Top 100) | 6 |
| Hungarian Albums (MAHASZ) | 31 |
| Japanese Albums (Oricon) | 5 |
| New Zealand Albums (RMNZ) | 17 |
| Norwegian Albums (VG-lista) | 7 |
| Scottish Albums (Official Charts) | 42 |
| Spanish Albums (AFYVE) | 8 |
| Swedish Albums (Sverigetopplistan) | 3 |
| Swiss Albums (Schweizer Hitparade) | 3 |
| UK Albums (Official Charts) | 18 |
| US Billboard 200 | 28 |

2008 weekly chart performance for 5
| Chart (2008) | Peak position |
|---|---|
| Italian Albums (FIMI) | 95 |

=== Year-end charts ===
1998 year-end chart performance for 5
| Chart (1998) | Position |
|---|---|
| Austrian Albums (Ö3 Austria) | 21 |
| Belgian Albums (Ultratop Flanders) | 84 |
| Belgian Albums (Ultratop Wallonia) | 88 |
| Dutch Albums (Album Top 100) | 42 |
| French Albums (SNEP) | 49 |
| German Albums (Offizielle Top 100) | 37 |
| Swiss Albums (Schweizer Hitparade) | 31 |
| US Billboard 200 | 181 |

1999 year-end chart performance for 5
| Chart (1999) | Position |
|---|---|
| Australian Albums (ARIA) | 77 |
| Austrian Albums (Ö3 Austria) | 30 |
| Dutch Albums (Album Top 100) | 71 |
| German Albums (Offizielle Top 100) | 22 |
| New Zealand Albums (RMNZ) | 36 |
| Swiss Albums (Schweizer Hitparade) | 32 |
| US Billboard 200 | 43 |

2000 year-end chart performance for 5
| Chart (2000) | Position |
|---|---|
| US Billboard 200 | 142 |

== Certifications ==
Certifications for 5
| Region | Certification | Certified units/sales |
|---|---|---|
| Argentina (CAPIF) | Platinum | 60,000^{^} |
| Australia (ARIA) | Platinum | 70,000^{^} |
| Austria (IFPI Austria) | Gold | 25,000^{*} |
| Canada (Music Canada) | Platinum | 100,000^{^} |
| France (SNEP) | 2× Gold | 200,000^{*} |
| Germany (BVMI) | Gold | 250,000^{^} |
| Japan (RIAJ) | Platinum | 200,000^{^} |
| Netherlands (NVPI) | Platinum | 100,000^{^} |
| New Zealand (RMNZ) | Platinum | 15,000^{^} |
| Norway (IFPI Norway) | Gold | 25,000^{*} |
| Poland (ZPAV) | Gold | 50,000^{*} |
| Spain (Promusicae) | Platinum | 100,000^{^} |
| Sweden (GLF) | Gold | 40,000^{^} |
| Switzerland (IFPI Switzerland) | Platinum | 50,000^{^} |
| United Kingdom (BPI) | Gold | 100,000^{^} |
| United States (RIAA) | 2× Platinum | 2,920,000 |
Summaries
| Europe (IFPI) | 2× Platinum | 2,000,000^{*} |
| Worldwide | — | 6,000,000 |
^{*} Sales figures based on certification alone.^{^} Shipments figures based on certification alone.
