= No More Rain (In This Cloud) =

Single by Angie Stone

from the album Black Diamond
- Released: July 29, 1999
- Genre: Soul; R&B
- Length: 4:42
- Label: Arista
- Songwriters: Angie Stone; Bert Williams; Gordon Chambers; Jim Weatherly
- Producer: Angie Stone

Angie Stone singles chronology
"No More Rain (In This Cloud)" (1999)	"Life Story" (2000)

"No More Rain (In This Cloud)" is a song by American recording artist Angie Stone. It was written by Stone along with Bert Williams and Gordon Chambers for Stone's debut studio album, Black Diamond (1999), while production was helmed by Stone. The song is built around a sample of the 1972 record "Neither One of Us (Wants to Be the First to Say Goodbye)" by Gladys Knight & the Pips. Due to the inclusion of the sample, original writer Jim Weatherly is also credited as a songwriter.

Arista Records released the song as Stone's solo debut single in July 1999. It earned generally positive reviews from music critics and earned her the 2000 Soul Train Lady of Soul Award for Best Solo R&B/Soul Single as well as a Best New Artist nomination at the 2000 Soul Train Music Awards. On the charts, it reached number nine on the US Hot R&B/Hip-Hop Songs and also topped Billboard's Adult R&B Songs chart. Nigerian photographer and filmmaker Andrew Dosunmu produced an accompanying music video for "No More Rain (In This Cloud)."

== Background ==
"No More Rain (In This Cloud)" was written by Stone along with Bert Williams and Gordon Chambers, while production on the song was overseen by Stone herself. It contains excerpts of American R&B group Gladys Knight & the Pips's 1972 record "Neither One of Us (Wants to Be the First to Say Goodbye)" as written by Jim Weatherly. Due to the sample, Weatherly is also credited as a songwriter on "No More Rain (In This Cloud)." The song and its uplifting nature were largely inspired by the birth of Stone's son Michael D'Angelo Archer II, her only child with neo soul singer D'Angelo, who saved her from a state of depression. Billboard magazine noted that the song largely "focuses on the emotions associated with the end of a relationship."

== Critical reception ==
"No More Rain (In This Cloud)" received generally favorable reviews from music critics and earned Stone a nomination for Best New Artist at the 2000 Soul Train Music Awards. Entertainment Weekly critic Laura Morgan wrote: "Stone sings like a recovering victim of macho mistreatment. When she croons "My sunshine has come" on "No More Rain," the illumination feels like a hard-won victory." AllMusic editor Theresa E. LaVeck called the song a "beautiful standout single," while BBC Music described "No More Rain (In This Cloud)" as "sunny" and "soulful."

Chuck Taylor from Billboard remarked that the song possesses "the retro, '70s-vintage musical backdrop that much of the moment's revolutionary R&B-oriented movement is going for, along with a vocal that no one will question." He further wrote: "Commanding and yet supple, Stone sounds like a long-lived vet in her approach to this track about cleansing one's soul as the rain of life is at last done, with thoughts of rebirth close at heart. This incredibly effective track will certainly ignite, particularly in light of the artist's talk-back techniques throughout the song that will leave listeners convinced [...] that there's a new voice in town. Stone is destined for abundant rewards; one listen, and the truth will ring clearly."

== Chart performance ==
"No More Rain (In This Cloud)" peaked at number 56 on the US Billboard Hot 100 and became a top ten hit on the US Hot R&B/Hip-Hop Songs chart, peaking at number nine in the week of February 5, 2000. It also became Stone's first number-one hit on the US Adult R&B Songs chart. With ten weeks atop the chart, it was Stone's longest-running number-one hit on the Adult R&B Songs. Following her death in March 2025, "No More Rain (In This Cloud)" soared to number one on Billboard's R&B Digital Song Sales chart. It also debuted at number 15 on the Digital Song Sales chart.

== Music video ==
A music video for "No More Rain (In This Cloud)" was directed by Nigerian photographer and filmmaker Andrew Dosunmu.

== Track listings ==
CD maxi single
No.	Title	Writer(s)	Producer(s)	Length
1.	"No More Rain (In This Cloud)" (Radio Edit)	Angie Stone; Bert Williams; Gordon Chambers; Jim Weatherly	Stone	4:00
2.	"No More Rain (In This Cloud)" (Wookie Vocal Mix featuring Lain)	Stone; Williams; Chambers; Weatherly; Luther Lain Gray	Stone; Wookie^{[a]}	4:48
3.	"My Lovin' Will Give You Something"	David Gamson; Gerry DeVeaux; Melvin Ragin	DeVeaux	4:34
4.	"No More Rain (In This Cloud)" (Wookie Dub featuring Lain)	Stone; Williams; Chambers; Weatherly; Gray	Stone; Wookie^{[a]}	5:00
5.	"U Had a Lady" (duet with Carl Thomas)	Stone; Phil Temple; Rex Rideout; Sekou Aiken	Temple; Rideout	4:55

Remix single
No.	Title	Writer(s)	Producer(s)	Length
1.	"No More Rain (In This Cloud)" (Radio Edit)	Stone; Williams; Chambers; Weatherly	Stone	4:00
2.	"No More Rain (In This Cloud)" (StarGate Mix – Radio Edit)	Stone; Williams; Chambers; Weatherly	Stone; Stargate^{[a]}	3:54
3.	"No More Rain (In This Cloud)" (Erick Sermon Remix featuring Loon)	Stone; Williams; Chambers; Weatherly	Stone; Erick Sermon^{[a]}	4:16
4.	"No More Rain (In This Cloud)" (Wookie Vocal Mix featuring Lain)	Stone; Williams; Chambers; Weatherly; Gray	Stone; Wookie^{[a]}	4:48
5.	"No More Rain (In This Cloud)" (Album Version)	Stone; Williams; Chambers; Weatherly	Stone	4:42

Notes

- ^{^a} denotes additional producer

== Credits and personnel ==
Credits lifted from the liner notes of Black Diamond.

- Gordon Chambers – writer
- Gerry DeVeaux – executive producer
- Angie Stone – executive producer, producer, vocalist, writer
- Jim Weatherly – writer (sample)
- Bert Williams – writer

== Charts ==
=== Weekly charts ===
Weekly chart performance for "No More Rain (In This Cloud)"
Chart (1999–2000)	Peak position
Netherlands (Dutch Top 40 Tipparade)	18
Netherlands (Single Top 100)	90
US Adult R&B Songs (Billboard)	1
US Billboard Hot 100	56
US Hot R&B/Hip-Hop Songs (Billboard)	9

=== Year-end charts ===
Year-end chart performance for "No More Rain (In This Cloud)"
Chart (2000)	Position
US Hot R&B/Hip-Hop Songs (Billboard)	41

== Release history ==
Release dates and formats for "No More Rain (In This Cloud)"
Region	Date	Format(s)	Label(s)	Ref.
United States	July 29, 1999	Urban contemporary radio	Arista	
