= Is There Any Love in Your Heart =

1993 single by Lenny Kravitz

Single by Lenny Kravitz

from the album Are You Gonna Go My Way
- B-side: "Always on the Run" (live); "Freedom Train" (live); "What Goes Around Comes Around" (live); "Black Girl"
- Released: November 22, 1993
- Genre: Rock
- Length: 3:39
- Label: Virgin
- Composers: Lenny Kravitz; Craig Ross
- Lyricist: Lenny Kravitz
- Producer: Lenny Kravitz

Lenny Kravitz singles chronology
"The Buddha of Suburbia" (1993)	"Is There Any Love in Your Heart" (1993)	"Deuce" (1994)

Music video
- "Is There Any Love in Your Heart" on YouTube

"Is There Any Love in Your Heart" is a song by American musician Lenny Kravitz and released on November 22, 1993, by Virgin Records as the fourth single from his third studio album, Are You Gonna Go My Way (1993). Following its release, the song reached the top 50 in Australia and New Zealand and peaked at number 19 on the US Billboard Album Rock Tracks chart. The song was later included on the Japanese edition of Kravitz' 2000 compilation album, Greatest Hits. The music video was directed by Mark Romanek and features Canadian model Ève Salvail playing a vampire.

== Reception ==
James E. Perone in The Album: A Guide to Pop Music's Most Provocative, Influential, and Important Creations stated, "The Kravitz and Craig Ross collaboration 'Is There Any Love in Your Heart' re-creates the style of late 1960s' and early 1970s hard rock." Alan Sculley of The Crisis noted, "There is one particularly acidic track directed to gold diggers attracted by his celebrity status, "Is There Any Love in Your Heart."

== Track listings ==
All tracks are written by Lenny Kravitz. Additional writers are noted below.

UK CD single
No.	Title	Writer(s)	Length
1.	"Is There Any Love in Your Heart"	Craig Ross	3:39
2.	"Always on the Run" (live)	Slash	7:58
3.	"Freedom Train" (live)		2:41
4.	"What Goes Around Comes Around" (live)		10:29

UK 12-inch single
No.	Title	Writer(s)	Length
1.	"Is There Any Love in Your Heart"	Ross	3:39
2.	"Black Girl"		3:44
3.	"What Goes Around Comes Around" (live)		12:35

UK 7-inch and cassette single; Japanese mini-CD single
No.	Title	Writer(s)	Length
1.	"Is There Any Love in Your Heart"	Ross	3:39
2.	"Black Girl"		3:44

European CD single
No.	Title	Writer(s)	Length
1.	"Is There Any Love in Your Heart"	Ross	3:39
2.	"Always on the Run" (live)	Slash	3:44

Australian CD single
No.	Title	Writer(s)	Length
1.	"Is There Any Love in Your Heart"	Ross
2.	"Spinning Around Over You"	Ross
3.	"Freedom Train" (live)
4.	"Always on the Run" (live)	Slash
5.	"Stop Draggin' Around" (live)

Japanese mini-album
No.	Title	Writer(s)	Length
1.	"Is There Any Love in Your Heart"	Ross
2.	"All I Ever Wanted"	Sean Lennon Ono
3.	"More Than Anything in This World"
4.	"Spinning Around Over You"	Ross
5.	"Stop Draggin' Around" (live)
6.	"My Precious Love" (live)
7.	"Always on the Run" (live)	Slash
8.	"Believe" (live)	Henry Hirsch

== Charts ==
Chart (1993–1994)	Peak position
Australia (ARIA)	32
Canada Top Singles (RPM)	53
Japan (Oricon)	27
New Zealand (Recorded Music NZ)	50
UK Singles (Official Charts)	52
UK Airplay (ERA)	41
US Mainstream Rock (Billboard)	19

== Release history ==
Region	Date	Format(s)	Label(s)	Ref.
United Kingdom	November 22, 1993	12-inch vinyl; CD; cassette	Virgin	
United Kingdom	November 29, 1993	7-inch vinyl	Virgin	
Japan	January 12, 1994	Mini-CD	Virgin	
Australia	January 24, 1994	CD; cassette	Virgin	
Japan	February 16, 1994	Mini-album	Virgin	

== Uses ==
- The song was featured in the season 7 episode "Pumping Iron" of the MTV animated television series Beavis and Butt-Head.
