= Life Story =

Life Story may refer to:

- Life Story (TV series), a 2014 British natural history television series
- Life Story (film), a 1987 TV film dramatisation of the discovery of the structure of DNA
- Life Story (album), the 2000 debut album by Black Rob
- Life story work, a social work psychological intervention
- "Life-Story", a widely anthologized short story from Lost in the Funhouse by John Barth
- "Life Story" (song), a 1999 song by Angie Stone
- "Life Story", a song by Barbra Streisand from the album Guilty
- Fantastic Four: Life Story, a 2021 comic by Marvel Comics
