= Ève Salvail =

Canadian model (born 1971)

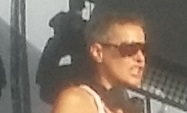
- Salvail in 2019
- Born: April 7, 1971 (age 55); Matane, Quebec
- Modeling information
- Height: 177 cm (5 ft 9 1/2 in)
- Hair color: Naturally brown; usually bleached, dyed, or shaved
- Eye color: Brown

Ève Salvail (born 7 April 1971) is a Canadian model known for her distinctive bald head and dragon tattoo. Rising to international prominence in the 1990s, she became one of the first models to challenge conventional beauty standards in high fashion. Her career has included work with major fashion houses such as Versace and Jean Paul Gaultier, appearances in films, and later ventures into music and television.

== Early career and breakthrough ==
Salvail was born in Matane, Quebec. While modelling in Japan in the early 1990s, she made the decision to shave her head bald and have a Chinese dragon tattooed on her scalp. Her distinctive look was spotted by Jean Paul Gaultier and she became a top model in the European fashion capitals. She worked with some of the biggest names in the industry, including Versace and Karl Lagerfeld.

She would often grow her hair and dye it blonde, red, or even pink. In later years, she sported very short blonde hair and moved away from modelling, though she has occasionally returned to her signature shaved head look.

== Media and entertainment work ==
Salvail appeared as herself in the Robert Altman film Prêt-à-Porter. She also made appearances in The Fifth Element and Zoolander. She has appeared on the covers of several magazines including Elle, Marie Claire, and Wired. Salvail also appeared in a Lenny Kravitz music video "Is There Any Love in Your Heart". She also made an appearance on America's Next Top Model where she spoke to the contestants of Cycle 6 about how her career got started.

In 2024, Salvail appeared as a contestant on the fourth season of Big Brother Célébrités, the French-Canadian celebrity version of the reality television series. She finished in 11th place and later returned to the show as the "patronne invisible" (invisible boss).

== Other ventures ==
She was the lead singer in a band called Ten Watt Mary. She has also collaborated with Bryan Adams. Since at least 2005, Salvail has been working as a DJ in New York, often using the name DJ Evalicious.

== Return to modeling ==
In 2011, she returned to high-profile modelling, appearing in a shoot for a Jean-Paul Gaultier exhibition in Montreal and later returned to the catwalk for his 2011/12 haute couture Fall/Winter show in Paris. She had her head completely shaved again, reverting to the bald, tattooed look she wore as a Gaultier muse in the mid-1990s.

Salvail continued to model in 2016 for the Chinese designer Ms Min.

== Personal life ==
Salvail publicly came out as a lesbian on the 9 January 2007 episode of the Tyra Banks Show titled "Coming Out Stories".
