= If You Can't Say No =

1998 single by Lenny Kravitz

Single by Lenny Kravitz

from the album 5
- Released: April 20, 1998
- Genre: Trip hop
- Length: 5:17 (album version); 4:17 (radio edit)
- Label: Virgin
- Songwriter: Lenny Kravitz
- Producer: Lenny Kravitz

Lenny Kravitz singles chronology
| "The Resurrection" (1996) | "If You Can't Say No" (1998) | "Thinking of You" (1998) |

Music video
- "If You Can't Say No" on YouTube

"If You Can't Say No" is a song by American singer-songwriter Lenny Kravitz, released in April 1998, by Virgin Records, as the first single from his fifth studio album, 5 (1998). The song was written by Kravitz and reached number eight in Iceland, number nine in Spain, and number 39 on the US Billboard Modern Rock Tracks chart. In Italy, it was a number-one airplay hit. Dance producer Brian Transeau and electronica band Zero 7 remixed the track. All instruments on the track were played by Kravitz.

== Critical reception ==
Larry Flick from Billboard magazine wrote, "The first radio slice of Kravitz's long-anticipated new collection, 5, shows the chameleon-like artist in excellent form—and donning the role of forlorn soul belter. Working within an instrumental context that carefully merges elements of electronica, classic funk, and traditional blues, the artist belts with a heartfelt authority that will make the hairs on the back of your neck stand up. Holding the track together is a subtle, pop-framed chorus that gradually seeps into the brain and is ultimately unshakable. Though none of 'em match the raw intensity of the original recording, several jeep and electronic remixes are included. In the end, they should do the trick in drawing newcomers to the Kravitz fold."

== Music video ==
The music video for "If You Can't Say No" was directed by American filmmaker Mark Romanek. It consists of Kravitz performing in a futuristic blue room, while he is being illuminated by a floating lamp. Supermodel and actress Milla Jovovich made a notable appearance in the video as Kravitz's girlfriend. The music video won an award for Best Art Direction at the 8th Annual MVPA Awards in 1999.

== Charts ==
| Chart (1998) | Peak position |
|---|---|
| Australia (ARIA) | 55 |
| Austria (Ö3 Austria Top 40) | 35 |
| Canada Rock/Alternative (RPM) | 21 |
| France (SNEP) | 97 |
| Iceland (Íslenski Listinn Topp 40) | 8 |
| Italy Airplay (Music & Media) | 1 |
| Netherlands (Dutch Top 40 Tipparade) | 4 |
| Netherlands (Single Top 100) | 52 |
| Scottish Singles Sales (Official Charts) | 55 |
| Spain (AFYVE) | 9 |
| Switzerland (Schweizer Hitparade) | 39 |
| UK Singles (Official Charts) | 48 |
| US Alternative Airplay (Billboard) | 39 |

== Release history ==
| Region | Date | Format(s) | Label(s) | Ref. |
|---|---|---|---|---|
| United States | April 20, 1998 | Alternative radio | Virgin | |
| United States | April 21, 1998 | Rhythmic contemporary; contemporary hit radio | Virgin | |
| Europe | April 27, 1998 | CD | Virgin | |
| United Kingdom | May 4, 1998 | 12-inch vinyl; CD; cassette | Virgin | |
