= Are You Gonna Go My Way (song) =

1993 single by Lenny Kravitz

Single by Lenny Kravitz

from the album Are You Gonna Go My Way
- B-side: "My Love"
- Released: February 8, 1993
- Genre: Hard rock; funk rock
- Length: 3:32
- Label: Virgin
- Songwriters: Lenny Kravitz; Craig Ross
- Producer: Lenny Kravitz

Lenny Kravitz singles chronology
"What the Fuck Are We Saying?" (1992)	"Are You Gonna Go My Way" (1993)	"Believe" (1993)

Music video
- "Are You Gonna Go My Way" on YouTube

"Are You Gonna Go My Way" is a song by American musician Lenny Kravitz, released in February 1993 by Virgin Records as the first single from his third studio album, Are You Gonna Go My Way (1993). The song was written by Kravitz and Craig Ross, while Kravitz produced it. It peaked at number one in Australia and number four on the UK Singles Chart, as well as number one on the US Billboard Album Rock Tracks chart and number two on the Billboard Modern Rock Tracks chart. The accompanying music video was directed by Mark Romanek.

The success of the song and the music video led to Kravitz being nominated for and winning several awards at the 1994 Grammy Awards and the 1993 MTV Video Music Awards. Since its release, "Are You Gonna Go My Way" has been covered by numerous artists, such as Metallica, Tom Jones, Robbie Williams, Mel B, Cactus Jack and Adam Lambert.

== Chart performance ==
"Are You Gonna Go My Way" was released as an airplay-only single in the US and thus was not eligible to chart on the Billboard Hot 100, but reached number one on the Billboard Album Rock Tracks chart and number two on the Billboard Modern Rock Tracks chart. It also reached the top five in the UK, peaking at number four. It is Kravitz's most successful single in Australia, where it peaked at number one for six weeks through April and May 1993. "Are You Gonna Go My Way" is the only diamond-certified single in Brazil, with over 500,000 downloads.

== Critical reception ==
AllMusic editor Stephen Thomas Erlewine described the song as "roaring". American magazine Billboard said it is Kravitz's "hardest and fastest to date". Billboard editor Larry Flick described it as a "passionate" track, that is "wrapped in the kind of retro, Jimi Hendrix-style guitar riffs that album-rock programmers go wild for." He added, "Spare boogie rhythms and a simply irresistible hook provide added radio incentive." Tony Harris from The Corsair called it a "throwaway hit single". David Browne from Entertainment Weekly felt that it "opens with a blast of phase-shifter electric guitar that could have been lifted directly off an old Jimi Hendrix or Isley Brothers album. And the lyrics are prime Kravitz." Dave Sholin from the Gavin Report declared it as "'90s rock", adding that "it doesn't get much better than this." Adam Sweeting from The Guardian remarked that Kravitz is "rocking it up a bit on the riffsome title track". In his weekly UK chart commentary, James Masterton wrote, "Kravitz returns to his own career in full Jimi Hendrix mode and at a stroke matching the peak of his biggest hit ever 'It Ain't Over 'til It's Over'."

Pan-European magazine Music & Media commented, "A special warning before you fasten your headphones. Kravitz cracks your nut with his hardest rocking single to date. A delicious earache." John Kilgo from The Network Forty wrote that "shades of Hendrix-a nice grungy-driven guitar with a crunchy rhythm beat highlights this funked rock release." Rick de Yampert from The News Journal viewed it as "feverish Hendrix". Rick Marin from The New York Times described the music video as a "frenzied, orgiastic performance exhuming (if not reincarnating) the spirit of Jimi Hendrix, complete with phase-shifter guitar and sexily slurred lyrics." A reviewer from Reading Evening Post declared the song as a "mixture of stomping drums and guitars, built around a grinding sub-Hendrixian riff", adding that "it's a bit too relentless and repetitive" to achieve the top 20 success of "It Ain't Over 'til It's Over". Jamie Parmenter from Renowned for Sound named it a stand out from the album, complimenting it for being an anthem of the early '90s, "a rollicking fast-paced rock masterpiece that shows Lenny's eye for a chart-topping tune and mastery at a catchy riff." Leesa Daniels from Smash Hits declared it as "a scorcher".

== Music video ==
A music video was shot to accompany the song, directed by American filmmaker Mark Romanek. It consists of Kravitz and his band playing in a large circular arena, with three tiered balconies stepped back from the center, filled by people dancing. Above the band and the dancers, lighting designer and director Michael Keeling created a chandelier of 983 cylindrical 23 cm incandescent light tubes (originally designed for aquarium use) that could be brightened and dimmed to create patterns of light. Cindy Blackman appears on drums in the music video, although she did not perform on the studio recording that plays in the video's audio track. "Are You Gonna Go My Way" was later made available by VEVO on YouTube in 2011, remastered in HD, and had generated more than 66 million views as of early 2024.

== Awards ==
The success of the song and the music video led to Kravitz being nominated for and winning several awards:

- Grammy Award for Best Rock Vocal Performance, Solo: Nominated
- Grammy Award for Best Rock Song: Nominated
- MTV Video Music Award for Best Art Direction: Nominated
- MTV Video Music Award for Best Male Artist: Won

== Track listings ==
- UK CD 1
1. "Are You Gonna Go My Way"
2. "It Ain't Over 'til It's Over"
3. "Always on the Run"
4. "Let Love Rule"
- UK CD 2 and Australian CD single
1. "Are You Gonna Go My Way"
2. "My Love"
3. "All My Life"
4. "Someone Like You"
- UK 7-inch and cassette single; Japanese mini-CD single
1. "Are You Gonna Go My Way"
2. "My Love"

== Charts ==
=== Weekly charts ===
Chart (1993)	Peak position
Australia (ARIA)	1
Austria (Ö3 Austria Top 40)	24
Belgium (Ultratop 50 Flanders)	12
Canada Top Singles (RPM)	5
Europe (Eurochart Hot 100)	7
Europe (European Hit Radio)	6
Finland (Suomen virallinen lista)	13
France (SNEP)	4
Germany (GfK)	25
Iceland (Íslenski Listinn Topp 40)	2
Ireland (IRMA)	6
Israel (Israeli Singles Chart)	20
Netherlands (Dutch Top 40)	6
Netherlands (Single Top 100)	8
New Zealand (Recorded Music NZ)	2
Norway (VG-lista)	7
Sweden (Sverigetopplistan)	18
Switzerland (Schweizer Hitparade)	12
UK Singles (Official Charts)	4
UK Airplay (Music Week)	3
US Album Rock Tracks (Billboard)	1
US Modern Rock Tracks (Billboard)	2

=== Year-end charts ===
Chart (1993)	Rank
Australia (ARIA)	11
Belgium (Ultratop 50 Flanders)	75
Canada Top Singles (RPM)	69
Europe (Eurochart Hot 100)	28
Germany (Media Control)	97
Iceland (Íslenski Listinn Topp 40)	9
Netherlands (Dutch Top 40)	60
Netherlands (Single Top 100)	76
New Zealand (RIANZ)	5
UK Singles (OCC)	47
UK Airplay (Music Week)	19
US Album Rock Tracks (Billboard)	2
US Modern Rock Tracks (Billboard)	14

== Certifications and sales ==
Region	Certification	Certified units/sales
Australia (ARIA)	Platinum	70,000^{^}
Brazil (Pro-Música Brasil)	Diamond	250,000^{*}
France (SNEP)	Gold	250,000^{*}
Italy (FIMI)	Gold	50,000^{‡}
New Zealand (RMNZ)	Gold	5,000^{*}
United Kingdom (BPI)	Gold	400,000^{‡}
^{*} Sales figures based on certification alone.^{^} Shipments figures based on certification alone.^{‡} Sales+streaming figures based on certification alone.

== Release history ==
Region	Date	Format(s)	Label(s)	Ref.
United Kingdom	February 8, 1993	7-inch vinyl; CD; cassette	Virgin	
Japan	February 26, 1993	Mini-CD	Virgin	
Australia	February 28, 1993	CD; cassette	Virgin	

== Covers ==
The song has been covered by numerous artists, such as Metallica, in a medley for "MTV Hits" at the 2003 MTV Music Video Awards, Tom Jones for the Jerky Boys OST, Robbie Williams on Jones' 1999 album Reload and Mel B in her solo section of the Spice Girls 2007 Reunion Tour. Serbian hard rock band Cactus Jack recorded a version on their live cover album DisCover in 2002. A remixed version is played as the opening theme song in Gran Turismo 3: A-spec. Adam Lambert covered the song in November 2012 in his swing through South Africa. Australian punk band Private Function covered the song on their 2020 album Whose Line Is It Anyway?

== See also ==
- List of Billboard Mainstream Rock number-one songs of the 1990s
- List of number-one singles in Australia during the 1990s
- The Unplugged Collection, Volume One
