= What the Fuck Are We Saying? =

Single by Lenny Kravitz

from the album Mama Said
- Released: September 1991
- Genre: Rock
- Length: 5:13
- Label: Virgin
- Songwriter: Lenny Kravitz
- Producer: Lenny Kravitz

Lenny Kravitz singles chronology
"Stand by My Woman" (1991)	"What the Fuck Are We Saying?" (1991)	"Stop Draggin' Around" (1991)

Music video
- What The .... Are We Saying? (2012 Remaster/Explicit) on YouTube

"What the Fuck Are We Saying?" is a song written and recorded by American singer Lenny Kravitz and released in September 1991, as the fifth single from his second studio album, Mama Said.

== Reception ==
Christopher A. Daniel of Albumism stated, "On the concerned 'What the Fuck Are We Saying?,' Kravitz takes crash courses in studying Stevie Wonder’s lyricism on the 1973 Grammy-winning LP Innervisions and Brian Eno’s (or maybe Kraftwerk’s) synthesizer methodology."

== Track listing ==
No.	Title	Writer(s)	Length
1.	"What the Fuck Are We Saying?"	Lenny Kravitz	5:13
2.	"Stop Draggin' Around"	Lenny Kravitz	3:05
3.	"Fields of Joy (Reprise)"	Hal Fredericks, Michael Kamen	4:00

== Charts ==
Chart (1991)	Peak position
Netherlands (Dutch Top 40)	25
Netherlands (Single Top 100)	34
