= Stand by My Woman =

Single by Lenny Kravitz

from the album Mama Said
- Released: September 2, 1991
- Genre: Rock
- Length: 4:19
- Label: Virgin
- Songwriters: Henry Hirsch; Stephen Mark Pasch; Anthony Krizan; Lenny Kravitz
- Producer: Lenny Kravitz

Lenny Kravitz singles chronology
"Fields of Joy" (1991)	"Stand by My Woman" (1991)	"What the Fuck Are We Saying?" (1991)

Music video
- Lenny Kravitz - Stand By My Woman on YouTube

"Stand by My Woman" is a song recorded by American musician Lenny Kravitz and released on September 2, 1991 by Virgin Records, as the fourth single from his second studio album, Mama Said (1991). The song is written by Kravitz with Henry Hirsch, Stephen Mark Pasch and Anthony Krizan, and was also produced by him. It peaked at numbers 64 and 76 on the US Cash Box Top 100 and Billboard Hot 100 charts. The accompanying music video was directed by Paul Boyd. "Stand by My Woman" was later included as a track on his 2000 album Greatest Hits.

== Critical reception ==
Christopher A. Daniel of Albumism named "Stand by My Woman" as "one of the album's more remorseful moments, allowing Kravitz to be vulnerable over gospel-inspired pianos and organs." Greg Kot of the Chicago Tribune wrote, "As demonstrated on 'All I Ever Wanted' and 'Stand by My Woman', Kravitz is particularly fond of John Lennon's Plastic Ono Band phase, in which Phil Spector's echo-laden production inflated the sparest instrumentation-simple snare beats, bell-like piano chords-around gut-wrenching vocals." Elysa Gardner of Rolling Stone stated, "Prince – a musician whose penchant for producing and playing various instruments Kravitz shares and a singer whose whisper-to-a-scream vocal style he adopts for urgent numbers like 'Stand by My Woman'." Caroline Sullivan from Smash Hits deemed it "a slow, serious one." She added, "This is all brooding and emotional and you can just see Len furrowing his brow as he sings. It's not as immediately catchy as the last one, but repeated listenings make you feel like you're doing something educational and mind-improving. Sort of."

== Music video ==
The music video for "Stand by My Woman" was directed by Scottish director Paul Boyd, and was included in Kravitz's first video album Video Retrospective released in 1991. Also in the video is Quincy Jones' daughter Kidida Jones, and includes the second film work of then-teenage actress Angelina Jolie but her footage was limited to two shots. Kravitz told Us Weekly magazine, "Angelina Jolie auditioned for the lead in my Stand by My Woman video. The director passed!"

== Track listing ==
All tracks are written by Henry Hirsch, Stephen Mark Pasch, Anthony Krizan, Lenny Kravitz.

No.	Title	Length
1.	"Stand by My Woman"	4:19
2.	"Flowers For Zoe"	2:45

== Charts ==
Chart (1991)	Peak position
Australia (ARIA)	46
France (SNEP)	36
Germany (GfK)	66
UK Singles (Official Charts)	55
UK Airplay (Music Week)	40
US Billboard Hot 100	76
US Cash Box Top 100	64
