= Ruvén Afanador =

Colombian photographer (b. 1959)

- Born: 1959 (age 66–67); Bucaramanga, Colombia
- Occupation: Photographer
- Known for: Fashion photography; portrait photography
- Partner: Edward Bess
- Website: ruvenafanador.com

Ruvén Afanador (sometimes spelled Ruven Afanador; born 1959, Bucaramanga, Colombia) is a Colombian-American photographer known for fashion photography and celebrity portraits. His work has appeared in Vogue, Vanity Fair, and The New York Times Magazine, and he has photographed subjects including Jennifer Aniston, Bill Clinton, and Rihanna.

Afanador has also published monographs on Spanish flamenco and Colombian indigenous communities.

== Early life and education ==
Afanador was born to Isabel Peña de Afanador, a teacher, and Ernesto Afanador, a watchmaker and antique collector. He has three sisters. The family belonged to the Seventh-day Adventist Church.

In 1972, when Afanador was 14, his family immigrated to the United States, first settling in Harbor Springs, Michigan before moving to Maryland. Born Rubén, he changed his name to Ruvén for easier pronunciation.

Afanador studied fine arts with a concentration in sculpture and graphic design. He delayed taking a required photography class until his final year. After his first photography assignment, he saw the film The Eyes of Laura Mars and concentrated on fashion photography.

== Career ==
Afanador brings historical reference into his images, and his work is influenced by classical painting and the early era of photography. Classical dance has been a consistent influence throughout his work.

=== Fashion and portrait photography ===
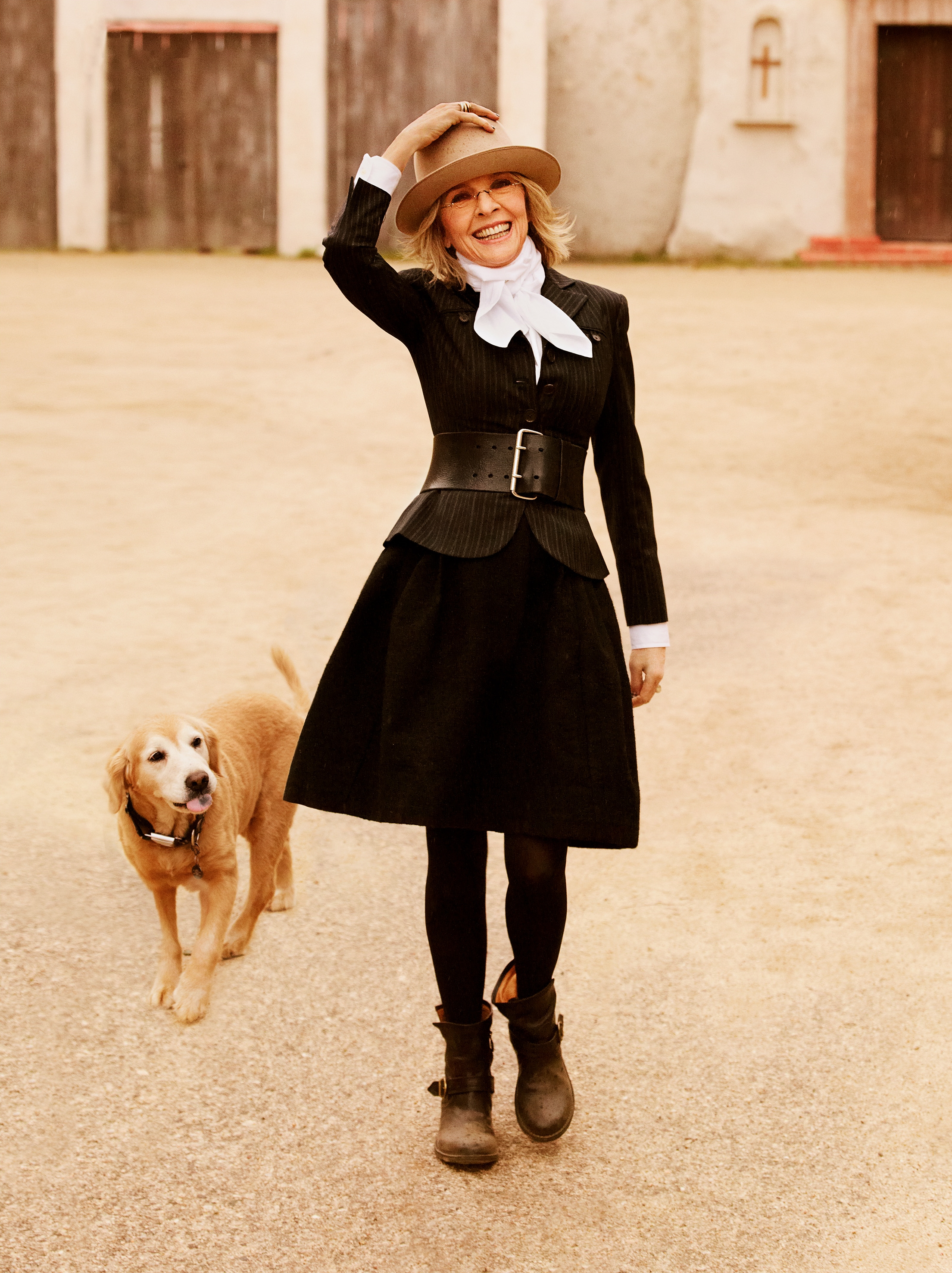
Afanador's 2012 portrait of actor Diane Keaton

Afanador's work has appeared in American Elle, Esquire, GQ, New York Magazine, The New Yorker, The New York Times Magazine, Rolling Stone, Vanity Fair, and American and French Vogue.

He has photographed numerous celebrities including Jennifer Aniston, Bill Clinton, Diane Keaton, Rossy de Palma, Robert Redford, Rihanna, Oprah Winfrey, and the Duchess of Alba.

Afanador photographed the cover of Tina Fey's 2011 memoir Bossypants. He also shot the album covers for Gerald Levert's Groove On (1994), Diana Ross's Take Me Higher, Lenny Kravitz's Circus (both 1995), Tweet's Southern Hummingbird (2002), and Amel Larrieux's Lovely Standards (2007), and directed the music videos for Kravitz's "Rock and Roll Is Dead" and "Circus", and Qkumba Zoo's "The Child (Inside)" (all 1995).

=== Monographs ===
==== Torero ====
Afanador's first book, Torero (2001), is a collection of portraits of aspiring bullfighters in his native Colombia, during various stages of preparation for the corrida. The book subverts conventional bullfighting iconography, focusing on the ritualistic aspects of the sport and the details of clothing and costumes.

==== Sombra ====
His second book, Sombra, released in June 2004, is of classical dancers. The models in Sombra wore body makeup to appear sun-weathered. Afanador's future partner, Edward Bess, appears in the book as a "faun-like creature".

==== Mil besos ====
Mil besos (2009) was conceived to celebrate women. The monograph features flamenco dancers, photographed over two and a half years in Andalusia.

==== Ángel gitano ====
Ángel gitano: The Men of Flamenco is of male flamenco dancers photographed against stark white backgrounds. The subjects were men of all types, variously styled with oversized mustaches, flowing dresses, thick black eye makeup, or simply nude. The images were captured in the Andalusia region of southern Spain. A documentary titled Ángeles gitanos was created as a making-of for the book.

==== Hijas del agua ====
Hijas del agua (2018) was created in collaboration with artist Ana González. To make portraits of women, men, and children from Colombia's indigenous communities, including the Wayuu, Guna-Dule, Misak, and Arhuaco peoples, the artists traveled through mountains and jungle, and González embroidered flowers onto Afanador's photographs, printed on various materials.

== Personal life ==
Afanador's partner is makeup artist and fragrance creator Edward Bess.

== Accolades ==
- 2000: Fashion Awards-Paris Photographer of the Year
- 2022: Smithsonian National Portrait Gallery "Portrait of a Nation" program: His 2013 portrait of civil rights activist Marian Wright Edelman was acquired for the museum's permanent collection
- 2025: The Ballet Nacional de España production Afanador, named for him and inspired by the flamenco photography of his Mil besos and Ángel gitano, won five Premio Max awards, including Mejor Espectáculo de Danza (Best Dance Show)

== Publications ==
- Torero (2001). Prologue by Héctor Abad Faciolince. Zurich: Edition Stemmle. ISBN 978-3-908163-48-0
- Sombra (2004). Prologue by Jean-Paul Gaultier. London: Merrell Publishers. ISBN 978-1-85894-249-0
- Mil besos (2009). New York: Rizzoli. ISBN 978-0-8478-3339-9
- Ángel gitano: The Men of Flamenco (2014). New York: Rizzoli. ISBN 978-0-8478-4343-5
- Hijas del agua (2020). With Ana González Rojas. Bogotá: Ediciones Gamma. ISBN 978-958-742-078-4
