= Fields of Joy =

Single by Lenny Kravitz

from the album Mama Said
- Released: July 16, 1991
- Genre: Rock
- Length: 3:57
- Label: Virgin
- Songwriter(s): Michael Kamen, Hal Fredricks
- Producer(s): Lenny Kravitz

Lenny Kravitz singles chronology
"It Ain't Over 'til It's Over" (1991)	"Fields of Joy" (1991)	"Stand by My Woman" (1991)

Music video
- Fields Of Joy (2012 Remaster) on YouTube

"Fields of Joy" is an original song by The New York Rock Ensemble (also known as The New York Rock & Roll Ensemble) released in 1971. Lenny Kravitz released a remake on July 16, 1991, as the third single from his second studio album Mama Said.

== Background ==
"Fields of Joy" is a cover of the 1971 song of the same name by the band New York Rock and Roll Ensemble. The song lyrics is about leaving all the troubles behind and go through the fields with a lover. The track features a guitar solo performed by Guns N' Roses' Slash. Slash and Kravitz were classmates at Beverly Hills High School but were not close. Kravitz explained to Music Radar, "When my first album was out, I went to the American Music Awards and Guns N’ Roses were getting awards and they were sitting in front of me. He and I just kept looking at each other. Then we realized we knew each other from school. So we started talking and were excited to meet each other again, especially the fact we were both making music. I was doing some overdub sessions for Mama Said, so he came in and played the solo on 'Fields of Joy.' It was a one-take solo and he wanted to play it over again, but I wouldn't let him. I always love first takes."

== Reception ==
Elysa Gardner of Rolling Stone stated, "After 'Fields of Joy,' an opening cut that segues from a gentle acoustic intro into a searing burst of electric guitar, much of the first half of Mama Said plays like a sampling of black pop circa, say, 1972." Christopher A. Daniel of Albumism added, "Mama Said kicks off with 'Fields of Joy,' opening with a folky acoustic riff backing Kravitz’s psychedelic vocals resembling post-Beatles John Lennon. Guitarist Slash contributes some funk/rock shredding to boot."

== Charts ==
Chart (1991)	Peak position
Netherlands (Single Top 100)	33
Netherlands (Dutch Top 40)	28
