= Believe (Lenny Kravitz song) =

1993 single by Lenny Kravitz

Single by Lenny Kravitz

from the album Are You Gonna Go My Way
- B-side: "Sister" (acoustic); "For the First Time"
- Released: May 10, 1993
- Genre: Rock
- Length: 4:50
- Label: Virgin
- Songwriters: Lenny Kravitz; Henry Hirsch
- Producer: Lenny Kravitz

Lenny Kravitz singles chronology
"Are You Gonna Go My Way" (1993)	"Believe" (1993)	"Heaven Help" (1993)

Music video
- "Believe" on YouTube

"Believe" is a song by American musician Lenny Kravitz, released by Virgin Records on May 10, 1993, as the second single from his third album, Are You Gonna Go My Way (1993). It is a rock ballad with string orchestration, and was co-written, arranged and produced by Kravitz, with Henry Hirsch also contributing to the orchestration and composition. Its lyrics concern one being able to achieve freedom and "eternal grace" if they believe in themselves and put their faith in God.

"Believe" was the first song from the album to be issued as a commercial single and to chart in the United States, where it reached number 60 on the Billboard Hot 100 chart. It found bigger success internationally, reaching number one in Iceland and the top 10 in Australia, Canada, and New Zealand. The accompanying music video was directed by Michel Gondry.

== Critical reception ==
Like much of Kravitz's previous material and the Are You Gonna Go My Way album, critics noted its musical influences, with Scott Poulson-Bryant of Rolling Stone pointing out the similarity between its "string-laden" coda and that of the 1971 song "Layla" by Derek and the Dominos. Larry Flick from Billboard magazine felt the track "makes easy switches between styles, from swaying pop ballad to treated psychedelia, and it builds to a grand finish." Writing for the Chicago Tribune, Patrick Kampert compared its sound, along with that of album track "Just Be a Woman", to the works of the Beatles. In his weekly UK chart commentary, James Masterton wrote that "the Beatlesque 'Believe' [is] tipping a nod in the direction of 'I am the Walrus' coupled with an anthemic chorus". Pan-European magazine Music & Media noted, "Church bells ring in the outro... Kravitz sees the light on the finest track off his current album. With this soulful ballad, he'll be the messiah for many formats."

In retrospective reviews of the album, Renowned for Sound said the track "still sounds relevant today", calling it an "uplifting rock ballad" and acclaiming its "impressive vocals and violin filled chorus [that is] very pleasant to the ear". Reviewing the album's deluxe edition for The Morton Report, Chaz Lipp called it a "rock radio hit" and "one of the biggest production numbers, with lush orchestration and phased lead vocals. It's a soaring, inspirational gem."

== Music video ==
The music video for "Believe" was directed by French director Michel Gondry, with visual effects contributed by the French company BUF Compagnie. It is an homage to Stanley Kubrick's 1968 science fiction film 2001: A Space Odyssey, with the Deutsches Filminstitut calling it "pretty close" to the look of the original film. "Believe" was later made available on YouTube in May 2011, and had generated more than nine million views as of August 2025.

== Track listings ==
CD single and CD maxi
No.	Title	Length
1.	"Believe" (album version)	4:51
2.	"Believe" (acoustic version)	4:07
3.	"Sister" (acoustic version)	6:07
4.	"For the First Time"	3:41

7-inch vinyl
No.	Title	Length
1.	"Believe" (album version)	4:50
2.	"Believe" (acoustic version)	4:00

== Credits and personnel ==
Credits adapted from album liner notes.

- Lenny Kravitz – lead and background vocals, bass guitar, drums, production
- Henry Hirsch – Wurlitzer, engineering, mixing
- Craig Ross – acoustic and electric guitar
- Michael Hunter – French horn
- Eric Delente – violin
- Soye Kim – violin
- Robert Lawrence – violin
- Sarah Adams – viola
- Liuh-Wen Ting – viola
- Allen Whear – cello
- Frank Murphy – cello
- Carolyn Davies Fryer – double bass

== Charts ==
=== Weekly charts ===
Chart (1993)	Peak position
Australia (ARIA)	8
Belgium (Ultratop 50 Flanders)	35
Canada Top Singles (RPM)	9
Europe (Eurochart Hot 100)	46
Europe (European Hit Radio)	8
France (SNEP)	33
Germany (GfK)	74
Iceland (Íslenski Listinn Topp 40)	1
Netherlands (Single Top 100)	40
New Zealand (Recorded Music NZ)	5
Sweden (Sverigetopplistan)	35
UK Singles (Official Charts)	30
UK Airplay (Music Week)	21
US Billboard Hot 100	60
US Alternative Airplay (Billboard)	10
US Mainstream Rock (Billboard)	15
US Cash Box Top 100	47

=== Year-end charts ===
Chart (1993)	Position
Australia (ARIA)	54
Canada Top Singles (RPM)	52
Iceland (Íslenski Listinn Topp 40)	18
New Zealand (RIANZ)	25
US Modern Rock Tracks (Billboard)	20

== Certifications ==
Region	Certification	Certified units/sales
Australia (ARIA)	Gold	35,000^{^}
^{^} Shipments figures based on certification alone.

== Release history ==
Region	Date	Format(s)	Label(s)	Ref.
United Kingdom	May 10, 1993	7-inch vinyl; 10-inch vinyl; CD; cassette	Virgin	
Japan	June 30, 1993	Mini-CD	Virgin	
