= It Ain't Over 'til It's Over =

1991 single by Lenny Kravitz

Single by Lenny Kravitz

from the album Mama Said
- B-side: "I'll Be Around"
- Released: June 3, 1991
- Genre: Philly soul; pop soul
- Length: 3:55
- Label: Virgin
- Songwriter: Lenny Kravitz
- Producer: Lenny Kravitz

Lenny Kravitz singles chronology
"Always on the Run" (1991)	"It Ain't Over 'til It's Over" (1991)	"Fields of Joy" (1992)

Music video
- "It Ain't Over 'til It's Over" on YouTube

"It Ain't Over 'til It's Over" is a song written, produced, and performed by American musician Lenny Kravitz for his second studio album, Mama Said (1991). Released as the album's second single in June 1991 by Virgin Records, the song is a mid-tempo ballad musically inspired by Motown, Philly soul, and Earth, Wind & Fire (particularly "That's the Way of the World"). The horn line at the end is performed by the Phenix Horns from Earth, Wind & Fire. "That song just came out one day, and I knew it had a classic vibe. And I still love that song very much today," Kravitz said in an interview for VivaMusic.com in 2000. The line is based on a Yogiism, or quotation from Yogi Berra: "It ain't over 'til it's over."

"It Ain't Over 'til It's Over" was Kravitz's first top-10 hit on the US Billboard Hot 100, reaching No. 2 to become his highest-peaking song on the chart. Worldwide, the single reached No. 2 in Canada and peaked within the top 10 in Australia, the Netherlands, and New Zealand. In the United Kingdom, it reached No. 11 on the UK Singles Chart. Jesse Dylan directed its music video. British singer Mutya Buena's 2007 song "Real Girl" contains a sample from "It Ain't Over 'til It's Over"; this recording peaked at No. 2 on the UK chart.

== Background ==
The song was written by Kravitz while dealing with a struggling marriage to his then wife, Lisa Bonet, and was an attempt to rekindle the relationship. Kravitz has described his thinking at that time as "not just a depression, but a fog. I didn’t know which way was up".

Initially Kravitz, realizing the hit potential of the song, did not want to release the song himself, wishing to remain an underground artist, thinking instead of giving the song to Smokey Robinson. His label, however, eventually persuaded him to include it on the album.

== Critical reception ==
Stephen Thomas Erlewine from AllMusic noted the song's "swirling Philly soul", describing it as "instantly addictive". Larry Flick from Billboard magazine complimented it as a "delicious slice of Philly soul/pop, flavored with lush strings, understated funk bass and guitar riffs, and Kravitz's engaging falsetto vocal. Could be a sleeper smash." Alex Henderson from Cashbox named the song one of the "goodies" from the album, describing it as "uptown soul"-flavoured. Adam Sweeting from The Guardian declared it as "nimble soul with chart potential". Pan-European magazine Music & Media felt the singer "sings in smooth tones, reminiscent of Curtis Mayfield and the Style Council. Soultime on EHR." Parry Gettelman from Orlando Sentinel complimented "a nice guitar solo that sounds a bit like Hall & Oates circa 'She's Gone'." Sunday Tribune's reviewer also noted the echoes of Paul Weller and Mayfield in the song.

=== Retrospective response ===
In a 2016 retrospective review, Christopher A. Daniel from Albumism remarked that the song "marries his Curtis Mayfield-inspired falsetto with chunky Stax Records guitars and a lush MFSB-flavored (possibly Love Unlimited Orchestra) string arrangement." In 2020, Carla Hay of AXS ranked it number four in her list of "The Top 10 Best Lenny Kravitz Songs". She wrote, "Kravitz has said he wrote this song about the breakdown of his marriage to actress Lisa Bonet (they eventually divorced), and the heartbreak is oozing all over this song." She added, "With a Motown-ish 1960s vibe, this ballad (from 1991's Mama Said album) is one of Kravitz's best ballads."

== Chart performance ==
"It Ain't Over 'til It's Over" is Kravitz's most successful single on the US Billboard Hot 100 chart to date, peaking at No. 2 having been held from the No. 1 spot by Bryan Adams' blockbuster hit "(Everything I Do) I Do It For You". It also reached No. 6 on the Cash Box Top 100, as well as No. 2 on the Canadian RPM Top Singles chart. The song was also popular in the United Kingdom, where it peaked at No. 11 on the UK Singles Chart.

== Music video ==
The accompanying music video for "It Ain't Over 'til It's Over", directed by American film director and production executive Jesse Dylan, features Kravitz and his band performing the song. Different kinds of background lighting colors were featured in the video.

== Track listings ==
- US cassette single

A. "It Ain't Over 'til It's Over"
B. "I'll Be Around"

- 7-inch single and UK cassette single
1. "It Ain't Over 'til It's Over" – 3:55
2. "The Difference Is Why" – 4:48
- 12-inch and CD single
1. "It Ain't Over 'til It's Over" – 3:55
2. "I'll Be Around"
3. "The Difference Is Why" – 4:48
- UK 12-inch picture disc

A. "It Ain't Over 'til It's Over" – 3:55
B. Lenny Kravitz talking to Robert Sandall in an interview for Q magazine – 15:20

- Japanese CD single
1. "It Ain't Over 'til It's Over" – 4:01
2. "Let Love Rule" – 5:43
3. "I'll Be Around" – 2:55
4. "Always on the Run" (instrumental) – 3:56

== Personnel ==
- Lenny Kravitz – vocals, electric guitar, bass, electric piano, drums, electric sitar, strings arrangements and horn arrangements
- The Phenix Horns – horn section
- Strings contracted by Al Brown

== Charts ==
=== Weekly charts ===
Chart (1991)	Peak position
Australia (ARIA)	10
Austria (Ö3 Austria Top 40)	25
Belgium (Ultratop 50 Flanders)	20
Canada Top Singles (RPM)	2
Canada Adult Contemporary (RPM)	6
Europe (Eurochart Hot 100)	23
Europe (European Hit Radio)	2
France (SNEP)	29
Germany (GfK)	43
Ireland (IRMA)	14
Luxembourg (Radio Luxembourg)	3
Netherlands (Dutch Top 40)	9
Netherlands (Single Top 100)	12
New Zealand (Recorded Music NZ)	5
Sweden (Sverigetopplistan)	21
UK Singles (Official Charts)	11
UK Airplay (Music Week)	1
US Billboard Hot 100	2
US Adult Contemporary (Billboard)	5
US Hot R&B/Hip-Hop Songs (Billboard)	10
US Cash Box Top 100	6

=== Year-end charts ===
Chart (1991)	Position
Australia (ARIA)	72
Canada Top Singles (RPM)	16
Canada Adult Contemporary (RPM)	60
Europe (European Hit Radio)	15
Netherlands (Dutch Top 40)	96
Netherlands (Single Top 100)	86
New Zealand (RIANZ)	44
US Billboard Hot 100	35
US Adult Contemporary (Billboard)	40
US Cash Box Top 100	46

== Certifications ==
Certifications for "It Ain't Over 'til It's Over"
Region	Certification	Certified units/sales
Denmark (IFPI Danmark)	Gold	45,000^{‡}
Italy (FIMI) Since 2009	Gold	50,000^{‡}
New Zealand (RMNZ)	Platinum	30,000^{‡}
Spain (Promusicae)	Gold	30,000^{‡}
United Kingdom (BPI) Sales since 2005	Gold	400,000^{‡}
^{‡} Sales+streaming figures based on certification alone.

== Release history ==
Region	Date	Format(s)	Label(s)	Ref.
United Kingdom	June 3, 1991	7-inch vinyl; CD	Virgin	
United States	June 1991	Cassette	Virgin	
Australia	June 17, 1991	7-inch vinyl; 12-inch vinyl; CD; cassette	Virgin	
Japan	June 21, 1991	CD	Virgin	
United Kingdom	July 1, 1991	12-inch picture disc	Virgin	
