= Mama Said (album) =

Studio album by Lenny Kravitz
- Released: April 2, 1991
- Recorded: 1990
- Genres: Rock; hard rock; psychedelic rock; soul
- Length: 52:38
- Label: Virgin
- Producer: Lenny Kravitz

Lenny Kravitz chronology
| Let Love Rule (1989) | Mama Said (1991) | Are You Gonna Go My Way (1993) |

Singles from Mama Said
- 1. "Always on the Run" Released: March 18, 1991; 2. "It Ain't Over 'til It's Over" Released: June 3, 1991; 3. "Fields of Joy" Released: July 16, 1991 (EU); 4. "Stand by My Woman" Released: September 2, 1991; 5. "What the Fuck Are We Saying?" Released: September 1991 (EU); 6. "What Goes Around Comes Around" Released: January 1992; 7. "Stop Draggin' Around" Released: April 1992 (AUS & NZ)

Mama Said is the second studio album by American rock musician Lenny Kravitz, released in April 1991 by Virgin Records. Guns N' Roses guitarist Slash co-wrote and played on the song "Always on the Run". He also played on the song "Fields of Joy". The song "All I Ever Wanted" was co-written by Sean Lennon.

Although the album has sold enough copies to be certified double platinum, the RIAA still has it listed as platinum. In the UK, the album reached number 8 on the UK Albums Chart. In 2012, Virgin Records released an expanded, double-disc version of the album with a number of remixes and bonus tracks.

== Critical reception ==
Professional ratings
Review scores
| Source | Rating |
|---|---|
| AllMusic | 4/5 stars |
| Chicago Tribune | 2.5/4 stars |
| Christgau's Consumer Guide | (2-star Honorable Mention) |
| Entertainment Weekly | C− |
| NME | 5/10 |
| Q | 4/5 stars |
| Record Collector | 4/5 stars |
| Rolling Stone | 3/5 stars |
| The Rolling Stone Album Guide | 4/5 stars |
| Select | 4/5 |

"Rather than synthesizing his influences in a way that allows him some personal expression," wrote Elysa Gardner of Rolling Stone, "Kravitz seemingly aims to acknowledge as many of them as he can in the course of an hour; the result is a rather disjointed album that lacks freshness and distinction. Kravitz continues to demonstrate a talent for crafting and arranging engaging songs; unfortunately, up to this point it has proven less a creative talent than a recreative one." Similarly, Chicago Tribune critic Greg Kot opined that "until Kravitz begins transforming his influences instead of just copying them, he'll remain a promising but minor artist." Phil Sutcliffe was more positive in Q, finding that Kravitz, while "not so much influenced as tie-dyed to the bone by the late '60s", sounds "truly inspired". The Village Voice's Robert Christgau commented, "don't think Hendrix–Beatles, think Prince–George Michael", later giving the album a "two-star honorable mention" grade.

In a retrospective review for AllMusic, Stephen Thomas Erlewine said that Kravitz had downplayed "some of the joy that informed Let Love Rule" in favor of a "more polished and studied" sound on Mama Said, which he deemed "another thoroughly enjoyable guilty pleasure ... it doesn't really matter that it's talking loud and saying nothing, because it sounds good while it's talking." Writing for Record Collector, Terry Staunton found it "even more accomplished" than its predecessor: "Rarely had traditional guitar rock and sweet soul merged so confidently, so effortlessly: further proof that we were in the midst of a major talent."

== Track listing ==
All songs were written by Lenny Kravitz, except where noted.

=== Original edition ===
1. "Fields of Joy" (Michael Kamen, Hal Fredricks) – 3:58
  - Arranged by Doug Neslund and Kravitz
2. "Always on the Run" (Kravitz, Slash) – 3:53
  - Featuring Slash
3. "Stand by My Woman" (Kravitz, Henry Hirsch, Stephen Mark Pasch, Anthony Krizan) – 4:20
4. "It Ain't Over 'til It's Over" – 4:03
5. "More Than Anything in This World" – 3:28
6. "What Goes Around Comes Around" – 4:50
7. "The Difference Is Why" – 4:53
8. "Stop Draggin' Around" – 2:39
9. "Flowers for Zoë" – 2:44
10. "Fields of Joy (Reprise)" (Kamen, Fredricks) – 3:59
  - Arranged by Kravitz
11. "All I Ever Wanted" (Kravitz, Sean Ono Lennon) – 4:14
12. "When the Morning Turns to Night" – 2:59
13. "What the Fuck Are We Saying?" – 5:14
14. "Butterfly" – 1:51

=== 21st anniversary edition bonus tracks ===
Disc one
The Studio B-Sides

15. "Light Skin Girl from London" – 2:42
16. "I'll Be Around" – 2:55
17. "Always on the Run" (instrumental) (Kravitz, Slash) – 3:54

The Unreleased 12"

18. "It Ain't Over 'Til It's Over" (12" remix instrumental) – 4:37
19. "It Ain't Over 'Til It's Over" (12" extended/dub version) – 8:08

Disc two
The Demos: Mama in Progress

1. "Riding on the Wings of My Lord" (rough demo) – 3:02
2. "It Ain't Over 'Til It's Over" (home demo) – 2:05
3. "What the Fuck Are We Saying?" (home demo) – 3:35
4. "The Difference Is Why" (home demo) – 3:55
5. "Riding on the Wings of My Lord" (funky vocal) – 3:41
6. "Riding on the Wings of My Lord" (instrumental) – 3:03
7. "Framed, Lying Crying" (instrumental segue) – 0:23
8. "Stand by My Woman" (instrumental) (Kravitz, Hirsch, Pasch, Krizan) – 4:20

Live in Rotterdam Nov. 15, 1991

9. "Stop Draggin' Around" – 3:06
10. "Always on the Run" (Kravitz, Slash) – 5:26
11. "Fields of Joy" (Kamen, Fredricks) – 4:19
12. "Stand by My Woman" (Kravitz, Hirsch, Pasch, Krizan) – 4:59
13. "More Than Anything in This World" – 8:16

The Live in Japan B-Sides

14. "Always on the Run" (Kravitz, Slash) – 5:20
15. "Stop Draggin' Around" – 3:06
16. "What the Fuck Are We Saying?" – 5:20

== Personnel ==
- Lenny Kravitz – vocals, guitar, keyboards, bass, drums, electric sitar
- Slash – guitar solos on tracks 1 and 2
- Henry Hirsch – keyboards, bass
- Karl Denson – saxophone on tracks 2, 3, 6 and 13
- Butch Thomas – saxophone on track 2
- Mike Hunter – trumpet on track 2
- Phenix Horns – horns on track 4
- Zoro – drums on track 6
- Lebron Scott – bass on track 6
- Adam Widoff – guitar on track 6
- David Domanich – drums on track 8
- Nancy Ives – cello on track 9
- Sean Ono Lennon – piano on track 11

=== Production and design ===
- Engineering by David Domanich and Henry Hirsch
- Mastered by Greg Calbi at Sterling Sound Studios
- 21st Anniversary Edition mastered by Evren Göknar at Capitol Mastering
- Mixed by Henry Hirsch at Waterfront Studios
- Art direction by Melanie Nissen
- Artwork design by Tom Bouman
- Photography by James Colderaro

== Charts ==
=== Weekly charts ===
Weekly chart performance for Mama Said
| Chart (1991) | Peak position |
|---|---|
| Australian Albums (ARIA) | 10 |
| Austrian Albums (Ö3 Austria) | 12 |
| Dutch Albums (Album Top 100) | 5 |
| Finnish Albums (Suomen virallinen lista) | 15 |
| French Albums (SNEP) | 11 |
| German Albums (Offizielle Top 100) | 20 |
| New Zealand Albums (RMNZ) | 19 |
| Norwegian Albums (VG-lista) | 4 |
| Spanish Albums (AFYVE) | 38 |
| Swedish Albums (Sverigetopplistan) | 14 |
| Swiss Albums (Schweizer Hitparade) | 5 |
| UK Albums (Official Charts) | 8 |
| US Billboard 200 | 39 |

| Chart (2012) | Peak position |
|---|---|
| Belgian Albums (Ultratop Wallonia) | 143 |

=== Year-end charts ===
Year-end chart performance for Mama Said
| Chart (1991) | Position |
|---|---|
| Australian Albums (ARIA) | 37 |
| Austrian Albums (Ö3 Austria) | 35 |
| Dutch Albums (Album Top 100) | 4 |
| German Albums (Offizielle Top 100) | 56 |
| New Zealand Albums (RMNZ) | 49 |
| Swiss Albums (Schweizer Hitparade) | 15 |

== Certifications and sales ==
Certifications and sales for Mama Said
| Region | Certification | Certified units/sales |
|---|---|---|
| Argentina (CAPIF) | Gold | 30,000^{^} |
| Australia (ARIA) | Gold | 35,000^{^} |
| Austria (IFPI Austria) | Gold | 25,000^{*} |
| Canada (Music Canada) | Platinum | 100,000^{^} |
| France (SNEP) | Platinum | 300,000^{*} |
| Germany (BVMI) | Gold | 250,000^{^} |
| Netherlands (NVPI) | Platinum | 100,000^{^} |
| New Zealand (RMNZ) | Gold | 7,500^{‡} |
| Sweden (GLF) | Gold | 50,000^{^} |
| Switzerland (IFPI Switzerland) | Gold | 25,000^{^} |
| United Kingdom (BPI) | Platinum | 300,000^{^} |
| United States (RIAA) | Platinum | 1,880,000 |
^{*} Sales figures based on certification alone.^{^} Shipments figures based on certification alone.^{‡} Sales+streaming figures based on certification alone.
