= Always on the Run (Lenny Kravitz song) =

1991 single by Lenny Kravitz

Single by Lenny Kravitz featuring Slash

from the album Mama Said
- Released: March 18, 1991
- Genre: Funk rock
- Length: 3:53
- Label: Virgin
- Songwriters: Lenny Kravitz; Slash
- Producer: Lenny Kravitz

Lenny Kravitz singles chronology
"Does Anybody Out There Even Care" (1990)	"Always on the Run" (1991)	"It Ain't Over 'til It's Over" (1991)

Slash singles chronology
"Hey Stoopid" (1991)	"Always on the Run" (1991)	"Break Like the Wind" (1992)

Music video
- "Lenny Kravitz - Always On The Run (Official Music Video)" on YouTube

"Always on the Run" is a song by American rock musician Lenny Kravitz, released as the first single from his second album, Mama Said (1991), in March 1991 by Virgin Records. It features a contribution by Guns N' Roses guitarist Slash. Slash had written the music for the song with the original intention of releasing it on a Guns N' Roses studio album, but since former drummer Steven Adler had difficulty playing the song, he saved it for this eventual collaboration with Kravitz. Its music video was directed by Jesse Dylan. On June 6, 1992, during Guns N' Roses's Use Your Illusion Tour stop in Paris, Kravitz joined the band onstage and played guitar and sang vocals for this track.

== Background ==
Slash met up with Kravitz for a vodka fueled songwriting session directly after finishing his European tour. After the last date, he jumped on the concorde and flew from London to New York at nine in the morning. Kravitz recalled to Rolling Stone, "He had me get a gallon of vodka and a bag of ice and we went into the studio and bang, there it was. The two of us wrote and cut the tune. I played drums; he played guitar; Then I played my guitar, bass and did vocals. I brought the horn players in and it was done. Then he got on a plane the next morning and went to LA. It was a wild day."

== Critical reception ==
In a retrospective review, Carla Hay of AXS stated, "As the first single from his 1991 album, Mama Said, 'Always on the Run' further established Kravitz as a powerhouse rocker who expertly blended retro influences with modern sounds." Upon the release, Simon Reynolds from Melody Maker said, "During the rather nifty boogie-funk [...], Kravitz's persona shifts with every vocal phrase – Hendrix/Sly Stone/Costello – and sometimes all at once. I like it, but sometimes you have to be firm." Pan-European magazine Music & Media wrote, "Kravitz has always been heavily influenced by '60s artists like Lennon and Hendrix, and this time it is James Brown's turn to play godfather, too. The song leans on a strong staccato rhythm guitar and a sharp horn section. Good grooves provided."

== Chart performance ==
"Always on the Run" reached the top ten on the US Billboard Modern Rock Tracks chart, peaking at number eight.

== Music video ==
The accompanying music video for "Always on the Run" was directed by American film director and production executive Jesse Dylan. It consists of the performance of the song featuring Lenny Kravitz' band and Slash, filmed in black and white.

== Track listing ==
1. "Always on the Run"
2. "Butterfly"
3. "Light Skin Girl from London"
4. "Always on the Run" (instrumental)

== Charts ==
=== Weekly charts ===
Chart (1991)	Peak position
Australia (ARIA)	43
Belgium (Ultratop 50 Flanders)	26
Finland (Suomen virallinen lista)	29
Netherlands (Dutch Top 40)	5
Netherlands (Single Top 100)	8
Switzerland (Schweizer Hitparade)	25
UK Singles (OCC)	41
US Alternative Airplay (Billboard)	8
US Mainstream Rock (Billboard)	40

=== Year-end charts ===
Chart (1991)	Position
Netherlands (Dutch Top 40)	59
Netherlands (Single Top 100)	90

== Release history ==
Region	Date	Format(s)	Label(s)	Ref.
United Kingdom	March 18, 1991	7-inch vinyl; 12-inch vinyl; CD	Virgin	
Australia	April 1, 1991	7-inch vinyl; 12-inch vinyl; CD; cassette	Virgin	
Japan	April 3, 1991	Mini-CD	Virgin	
United Kingdom	April 15, 1991	12-inch vinyl box set; cassette	Virgin	
