= Craig Ross =

American guitarist

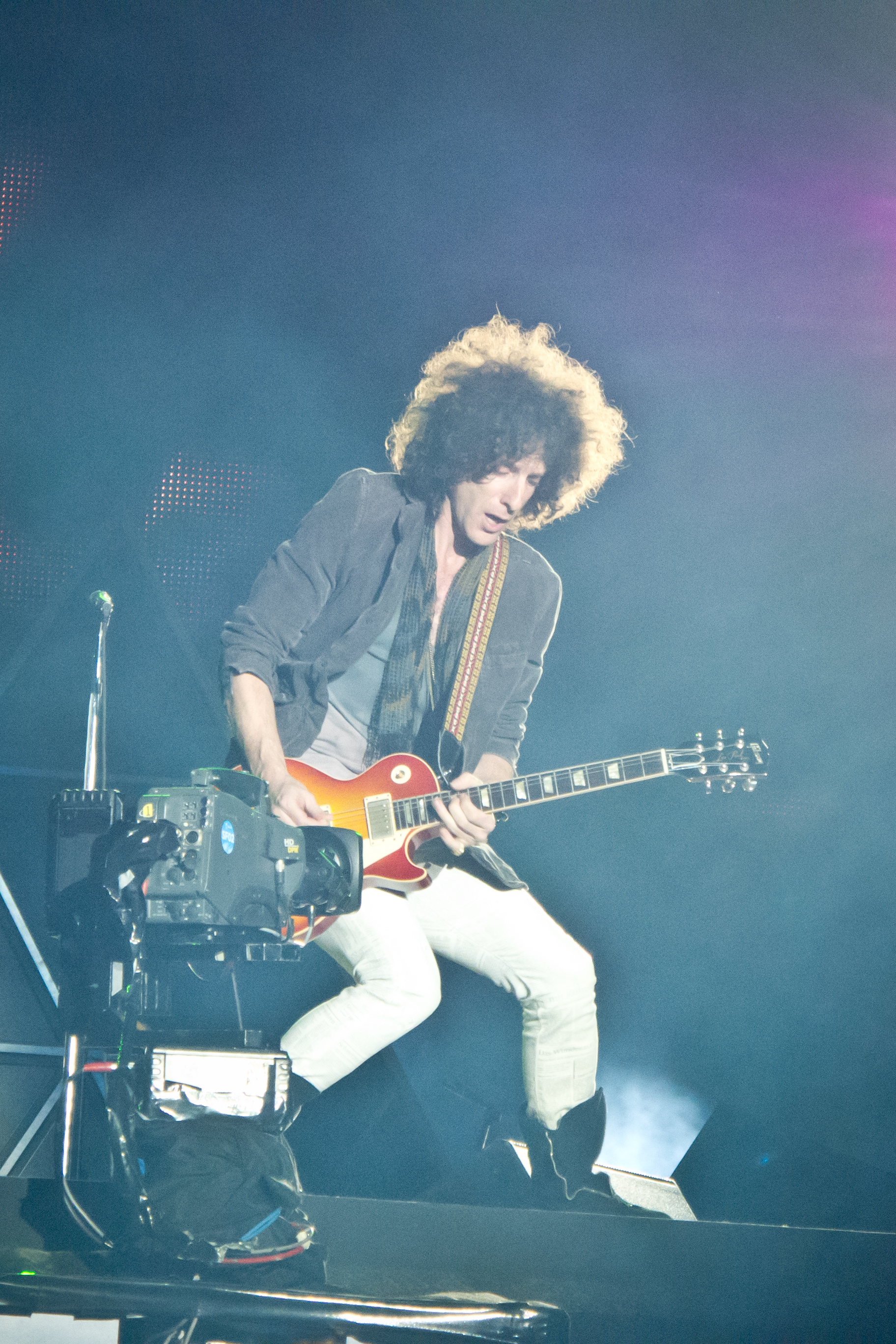
- Ross performing in 2012

Background information
- Born: Craig David Ross; March 10, 1964 (age 62)
- Origin: Los Angeles, California, U.S.
- Genres: Rock
- Occupations: Guitarist; songwriter
- Instruments: Guitar; mandolin; keyboards; percussion
- Years active: 1986–present
- Labels: MCA; Virgin
- Formerly of: The Broken Homes
- Spouse: Goya Toledo (m. 2014)
- Website: craigross.net

Craig David Ross (born March 10, 1964) is an American guitarist, best known for his work with singer Lenny Kravitz.

== Early life ==
Craig Ross was born and raised in Los Angeles, California. He borrowed a guitar from a neighbor's garage at age eight. He began playing the music of the Beatles and Chuck Berry, his early influences.

== Career ==
By the age of 16, Ross began playing guitar at Los Angeles clubs, and formed the band the Broken Homes c. 1980s; he performed under the stage name Kreg Ross. The band opened for prominent musical acts including Stevie Ray Vaughan, INXS, Jerry Lee Lewis, Guns N' Roses and Jane's Addiction. The Broken Homes signed with MCA Records to release three albums during the 1980s, on which they worked with producers such as Andy Johns. This seminal period gave Ross his start in professional musical work. He describes his musical influences as including Freddie King, Albert King, Jimi Hendrix, and Jimmy Page.

A "chance meeting" in a Los Angeles pool hall with Lenny Kravitz (facilitated by Kathy Valentine of the Go-Go's) led to a long-lasting musical partnership. After touring with Kravitz for 1991's "Mama Said", Craig joined Lenny in the studio, co-writing and playing guitars on his track "Are You Gonna Go My Way", an anthem that helped elevate Kravitz's career. The collaboration continued with stand-out solos on tracks such as "Believe" and "Is There Any love in Your Heart". Ross has since written songs and performed instruments on each of Kravitz's albums, as well as for other artists including Sheryl Crow, Mick Jagger, B.B. King, Eric Clapton, The Black Crowes, and Nikka Costa, among others.

Ross co-wrote the songs "Spinning Around Over You", "Are You Gonna Go My Way", "Is There Any Love in Your Heart", "Where Are We Runnin'?", "Stillness of Heart", and "Lady" with Kravitz, as well as various songs on Kravitz's 2008 album It Is Time for a Love Revolution. He also toured with Kravitz, most notably at the Glastonbury Festival in 1999. Ross and Kravitz performed at the 2012 Kennedy Center Honors tribute to Led Zeppelin, covering their 1969 song "Whole Lotta Love".

Ross played on The Black Crowes 2001 album, Lions on the track "Greasy Grass River", as well as on the band's former guitarist Marc Ford's first solo album, It's About Time in 2003.

== Personal life ==
Ross has two daughters named Mia and Devon with his first wife Anna. Since 2014, he has been married to Spanish actress Goya Toledo.
