= Gerry DeVeaux =

Bahamian television producer, presenter and host; magazine editor

Sir "Gerry" Gerald DeVeaux is a Bahamian songwriter/producer and creative director. DeVeaux was a contributing editor for style magazine Tatler. He was style consultant for MTV Networks co-hosting shows like MTV Style and contributing to shows like Who Wore What. He was a Creative Director and Judge on the show Britain's Next Top Model and Style Director and judge for Scandinavia’s Next Top Model.

He was a guest presenter on Australia's Next Top Model sharing on-screen style tips with Elle Macpherson. DeVeaux also shared his fashion advice on Project Catwalk and in the Channel 4 series Slave to Fashion with June Sarpong. He served as style Ambassador for Sony Cybershot and co-hosted the Sony-sponsored Sydney Fashion week. His other projects include producing and presenting his own half-hour BBC programme Living Style with Gerry DeVeaux, shown globally on BBC World and an MTV special showing his behind the scenes perspective for the US launch of Topshop with Kate Moss. He was also Creative Director for the charity campaign Fashion Targets Breast Cancer.

Among his multi-platinum music hits were "Be My Baby" for French singer/actress Vanessa Paradis and international hits for his cousin Lenny Kravitz, including 'Heaven Help'. He wrote and produced hits for Kylie Minogue and Angie Stone whom he signed to his label/imprint DeVox Records. The DeVeaux co-produced Angie Stone album Black Diamond was voted Best Album of The Year in the U.S. by Billboard, and was an international platinum seller. He has written hits for Chaka Khan including "Never Miss the Water".

DeVeaux was awarded a Knighthood in 2024 at Windsor Castle by HM King Charles III for Outstanding Services to Humanity and Entertainment..
