= Angie Stone discography =

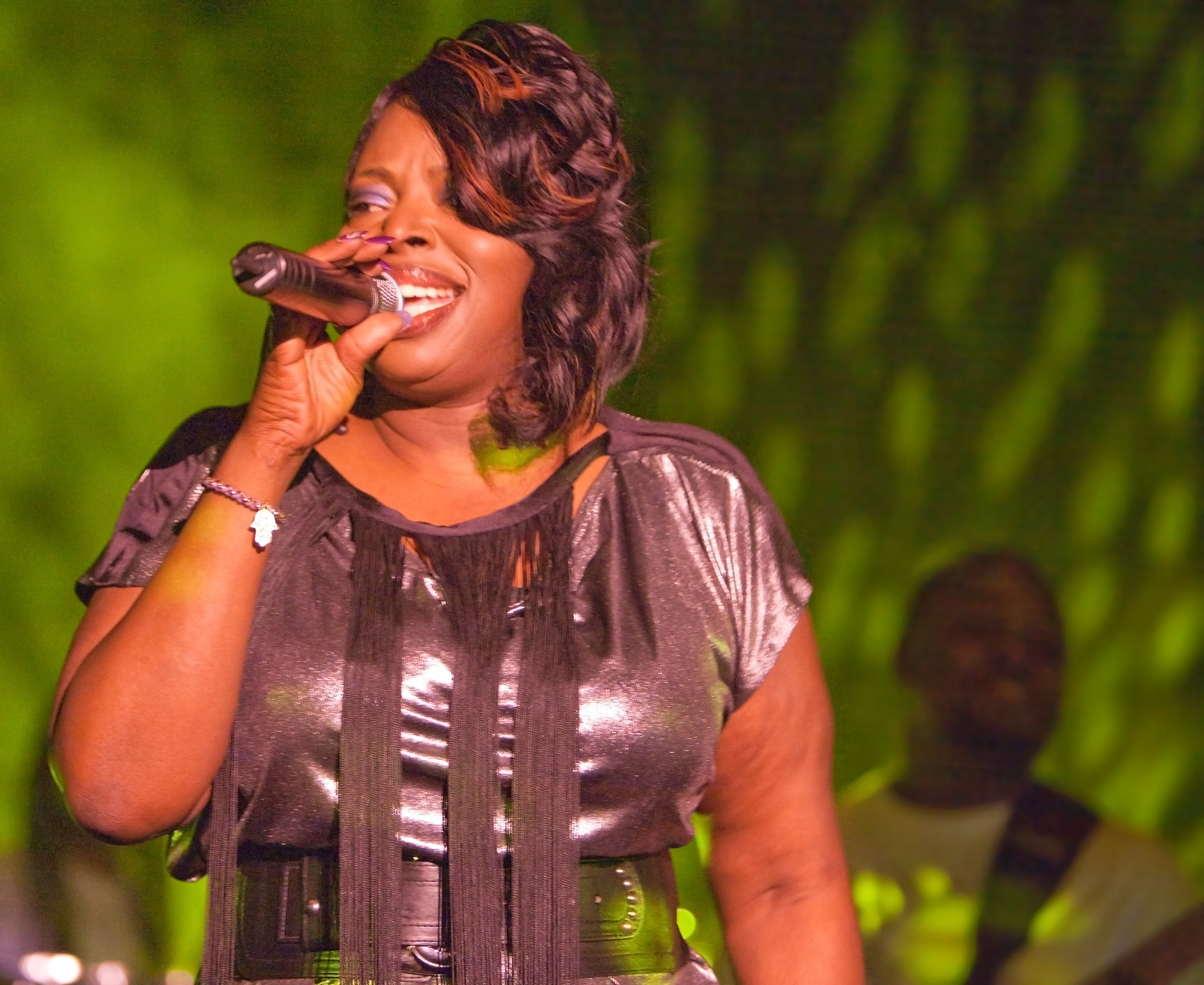
- Angie Stone performing live at the Berns Salonger in Stockholm, Sweden in 2010.
- Studio albums: 10
- Compilation albums: 1

Angie Stone was an American singer who released ten studio albums, one compilation album, and more than two dozen singles. She has sold near five million records as a solo artist, including over 1.4 million albums in the United States. Stone's career began as a member of the hip hop trio The Sequence in the late 1970s. In 1999, she released her first solo album, Black Diamond, on Arista Records. It debuted at number 46 on the US Billboard 200 and peaked at number nine on the Top R&B/Hip-Hop Albums, eventually selling more than 750,000 copies. Black Diamond was awarded gold by the Recording Industry Association of America (RIAA) and the British Phonographic Industry (BPI), and produced the singles "No More Rain (In This Cloud)", "Life Story" and "Everyday", the first of which became a number-one hit on the Adult R&B Songs chart.

Following her transition to J Records, Stone released her second album, Mahogany Soul. Another gold-seller in the United Kingdom and United States, it peaked at number four on the US Top R&B/Hip-Hop Albums, while reaching the top twenty of the Dutch, Finnish and Flemish Album Charts. Mahogany Soul sold more than 1.2 million copies worldwide, and produced four singles, including "Brotha" and its remix version featuring Alicia Keys and Eve as well as the international hit single "Wish I Didn't Miss You", which marked her first chart topper on the US Dance Club Songs. Stone Love, Stone's third album, was released in June 2004 and debuted at number 14 on the US Billboard 200, selling 53,000 copies in its first week of release. Her highest-charting international success, it entered the top twenty in Belgium, Finland, Sweden and the Netherlands. Its release was preceded by the single "I Wanna Thank Ya" featuring Snoop Dogg, a top five hit in Belgium and Stone's second chart topper on the US Dance Club Songs.

In 2005, Stone began recording what was expected to become her fourth regular album, but was eventually transferred to her first compilation album, Stone Hits: The Very Best of Angie Stone, which compromised songs from her first three albums. With "I Wasn't Kidding", the album produced one single. Following her departure from J Records, Stone signed with Stax Records and released The Art of Love & War. The album debuted at number eleven on the US Billboard 200, selling 45,000 copies in its first week, becoming Stone's highest-charting album in the United States, as well as her first and only album to top the Top R&B/Hip-Hop Albums chart. Lead single "Baby", a duet with Betty Wright, became her second number-one hit on the US Adult R&B Songs and was followed by two further singles. Elsewhere, The Art of Love & War failed to chart noticeably. Stone's second effort with Stax, her fifth studio album, Unexpected, was released in November 2009. A commercial failure, the album debuted and peaked at number 133 on the US Billboard 200. "I Ain't Hearin' U", the album's lead single, reached number 14 on Billboard's Adult R&B Songs.

Rich Girl, Stone's sixth album, was released to similar success. Issued by Saguaro Road Records following another label change, it peaked at number 15 on Billboard's Top R&B/Hip-Hop Albums. The album spawned two singles, including "Do What U Gotta Do", which reached number 13 on the US Adult R&B Songs. In 2015, Stone signed with Shanachie Records to release her seventh album, Dream, with the company. Her highest-charting effort since 2007's The Art of Love & War, it debuted and peaked at number 59 on the US Billboard 200 and number three on the Top R&B/Hip-Hop Albums chart. The album produced two singles, including "2 Bad Habits." The following year, Stone recorded and released her next studio album, Covered in Soul, through Goldenlane Records, which compromised cover versions of popular Phil Collins, Hot Chocolate, and Neil Diamond songs. Preceded by the single "These Eyes", a cover of the same-titled The Guess Who song, it failed to chart. Full Circle, Stone's ninth studio album, was released on July 12, 2019. Her tenth album, Love Language, was released on May 19, 2023.

== Albums ==
=== Studio albums ===
List of albums, with selected chart positions and certifications
Title	Album details	Peak chart positions										Certifications	Sales
Title	Album details	US	US R&B /HH	AUS	BEL	GER	FIN	NLD	SWE	UK	UK R&B	Certifications	Sales
Black Diamond	Released: September 28, 1999; Label: Arista; Formats: CD, cassette, digital download	46	9	84	—	—	—	28	—	62	4	RIAA: Gold; BPI: Gold; NVPI: Gold	US: 812,000
Mahogany Soul	Released: October 16, 2001; Label: J; Formats: CD, cassette, digital download	22	4	— (Note: Mahogany Soul did not enter the ARIA Albums Chart, but peaked at number 13 on the ARIA Hitseekers Albums Chart.)	15	—	5	15	23	89	15	RIAA: Gold; BPI: Gold; NVPI: Gold	World: 1,200,000; US: 758,000
Stone Love	Released: July 6, 2004; Label: J; Formats: CD, digital download	14	4	92	18	87	15	6	12	56	12		
The Art of Love & War	Released: October 16, 2007; Label: Stax; Formats: CD, digital download	11	1	—	—	—	—	—	—	103	10		
Unexpected	Released: November 23, 2009; Label: Concord, Stax; Formats: CD, digital download	133	17	—	—	—	—	—	—	—	37		
Rich Girl	Released: September 25, 2012; Label: Saguaro Road Rhythm; Formats: CD, digital download	109	15	—	—	—	—	—	—	—	—		
Dream	Released: November 6, 2015; Label: Shanachie; Formats: CD, digital download	59	3	—	—	—	—	—	—	—	29		
Covered in Soul	Released: August 5, 2016; Label: Goldenlane; Formats: CD, LP, digital download, vinyl,	—	—	—	—	—	—	—	—	—	—		
Full Circle	Released: July 12, 2019; Label: Conjunction, Cleopatra; Formats: CD, LP, digital download, streaming	—	—	—	—	—	—	—	—	—	—		
Love Language	Released: May 19, 2023; Label: Conjunction, SoNo; Formats: CD, digital download, streaming	—	—	—	—	—	—	—	—	—	—		

=== Compilation albums ===
List of albums, with selected chart positions
Title	Album details	Peak chart positions	
Title	Album details	US R&B /HH	UK R&B
Stone Hits: The Very Best of Angie Stone	Released: June 21, 2005; Label: J; Format: CD, digital download	50	29

== Singles ==
=== As lead artist ===
List of singles as lead artist, with selected chart positions and certifications, showing year released and album name
Title	Year	Peak chart positions										Certifications	Albums
Title	Year	US	US R&B /HH	US Adult R&B	US Dance	AUS	BEL (FL)	GER	NLD	UK	UK R&B	Certifications	Albums
"No More Rain (In This Cloud)"	1999	56	9	1	—	—	—	—	90	—	—		Black Diamond
"Life Story"	2000	—	—	—	—	—	— (Note: "Life Story" did not enter the Flemish Ultratop 50, but peaked at number 18 on the Ultratip chart.)	83	88	22	6		Black Diamond
"Everyday"	2000	—	52	21	—	—	—	—	—	80	11		Black Diamond
"Heaven Help"	2000	—	—	—	—	—	—	—	—	—	—		Black Diamond
"Brotha"	2001	52	13	3	—	—	— (Note: "Brotha" did not enter the Flemish Ultratop 50, but peaked at number five on the Ultratip chart.)	—	49	37	8		Mahogany Soul
"Wish I Didn't Miss You"	2002	79	31	2	1	7	19	94	45	30	7	BPI: Platinum; RMNZ: Gold	Mahogany Soul
"More Than a Woman" (featuring Joe)	2002	—	63	4	—	—	—	—	—	—	—		Mahogany Soul
"Bottles & Cans"	2003	—	—	—	18	—	—	—	—	—	—		Mahogany Soul
"I Wanna Thank Ya" (featuring Snoop Dogg)	2004	—	61	22	1	—	— (Note: "I Wanna Thank Ya" did not enter the Flemish Ultratop 50, but peaked at number five on the Ultratip chart.)	—	57	31	9		Stone Love
"U-Haul"	2004	—	68	19	—	—	—	—	—	—	—		Stone Love
"Stay for a While" (featuring Anthony Hamilton)	2004	—	70	21	—	—	—	—	—	—	—		Stone Love
"I Wasn't Kidding"	2005	—	—	35	17	—	— (Note: "I Wasn't Kidding" did not enter the Flemish Ultratop 50, but peaked at number 13 on the Ultratip chart.)	—	—	—	—		Stone Hits: The Very Best of Angie Stone
"Baby" (featuring Betty Wright)	2007	— (Note: "Baby" did not enter the Billboard Hot 100, but peaked at number three on the Bubbling Under Hot 100 Singles chart.)	22	1	3	—	—	—	—	—	—		The Art of Love & War
"Sometimes"	2008	—	26	7	—	—	—	—	—	—	—		The Art of Love & War
"Pop Pop"	2008	—	87	35	—	—	—	—	—	—	—		The Art of Love & War
"I Ain't Hearin' U"	2009	—	42	14	—	—	—	—	—	—	—		Unexpected
"Free" (featuring Young Nate)	2010	—	—	—	—	—	—	—	—	—	—		Unexpected
"Do What U Gotta Do"	2012	—	52	13	—	—	—	—	—	—	—		Rich Girl
"Backup Plan"	2012	—	69	23	—	—	—	—	—	—	—		Rich Girl
"God's Grace"	2013	—	—	—	—	—	—	—	—	—	—		Non-album single
"Dream"	2015	—	—	—	—	—	—	—	—	—	—		Dream
"2 Bad Habits"	2015	—	—	18	—	—	—	—	—	—	—		Dream
"These Eyes"	2016	—	—	—	—	—	—	—	—	—	—		Covered in Soul
"Dinosaur"	2019	—	—	27	—	—	—	—	—	—	—		Full Circle
"Kiss You"	2023	—	—	—	—	—	—	—	—	—	—		Love Language
"The Gym" (featuring Musiq Soulchild)	2023	—	—	—	—	—	—	—	—	—	—		Love Language
"Good Man"	2023	—	—	—	—	—	—	—	—	—	—		Love Language
"All I'm Missing" (featuring J. Brown and Juanita Wynn)	2024	—	—	—	—	—	—	—	—	—	—		Non-album single
"—" denotes the single failed to chart or was not released

=== As a featured artist ===
List of singles as a featured artist, with selected chart positions and certifications, showing year released and album name
Title	Year	Peak chart positions									Albums
Title	Year	US	US R&B /HH	US Rap	AUS	BEL (FL)	GER	NLD	NZ	UK	Albums
"Keep Your Worries" (Guru featuring Angie Stone)	2000	—	99	31	—	—	—	—	—	57	Jazzmatazz, Vol. 3: Streetsoul
"U Make My Sun Shine" (duet with Prince)	2001	59	— (Note: "U Make My Sun Shine" did not enter the Hot R&B/Hip-Hop Songs, but peaked at number eight on the Bubbling Under R&B/Hip-Hop Singles chart.)	—	—	—	—	—	—	—	Non-album single
"Be Thankful" (Omar featuring Angie Stone)	2001	—	—	—	—	—	—	—	—	85	Best by Far
"Signed, Sealed, Delivered I'm Yours" (Blue featuring Stevie Wonder and Angie Stone)	2003	—	—	—	31	38	29	16	22	11	Guilty
"No Stressing" (Damon Little featuring Angie Stone)	2023	—	—	—	—	—	—	—	—	—	Non-album single
"—" denotes the single failed to chart or was not released.

=== Promotional singles ===
List of promotional singles, with selected chart positions, showing year released and album name
Title	Year	Peak chart positions	Albums
Title	Year	US Adult R&B	Albums
"Coulda Been You"	2000	27	Black Diamond
"—" denotes the single failed to chart or was not released

== Other charted songs ==
List of other charted songs, with selected chart positions, showing year released and album name
Title	Year	Peak chart positions	Album
Title	Year	US Jazz	Album
"Happy Being Me?" (Angie Stone featuring Pauletta Washington)	2008	29	The Art of Love & War

== Other appearances ==
=== Album appearances ===
Title	Year	Artist(s)	Album
"Keep Your Worries"	2000	Guru featuring Angie Stone	Streetsoul
"Be Thankful"	2001	Omar featuring Angie Stone	Best by Far
"My Nutmeg Phantasy"	2001	Macy Gray featuring Angie Stone & Mos Def	The Id
"Jam for the Ladies"	2002	Moby featuring Angie Stone & MC Lyte	18
"Excuse Me"	2002	Raphael Saadiq featuring Angie Stone & Calvin Richardson	Instant Vintage
"The Messenger"	2002	Angie Stone	Sign of Things to Come: Steve's Picks of the Year
"Black Magic"	2002	Styles P featuring Angie Stone	A Gangster and a Gentleman
"The Prayer"	2002	Josh Groban featuring Angie Stone	Josh Groban in Concert
"Signed, Sealed, Delivered I'm Yours"	2003	Blue featuring Stevie Wonder & Angie Stone	Guilty
"You Will Know"	2003	Angie Stone	Conception: An Interpretation of Stevie Wonder's Songst
"Hold Me Down"	2004	Toshi featuring Angie Stone	Time to Share
"Jones vs. Jones"	2004	Kool & the Gang featuring Angie Stone	The Hits: Reloaded
"Since I Lost My Baby"	2005	Angie Stone	So Amazing: An All-Star Tribute to Luther Vandross
"All I Want to Do"	2005	Ray Charles with Angie Stone	Genius & Friends
"Come Together Now"	2005	Various Artists	Hurricane Relief: Come Together Now
"All for Me"	2006	Omar featuring Angie Stone	Sing (If You Want It)
"I Tried"	2006	Al Di Meola featuring Angie & and Macy Gray	Vocal Rendezvous
"The Windows of the World"	2006	Dionne Warwick with Angie Stone, Chanté Moore, Deborah Cox & Da Brat	My Friends & Me
"Who's to Blame"	2007	Angie Stone	We Are Family 2007
"Be Ever Wonderful"	2007	Angie Stone	Interpretations: Celebrating the Music of Earth, Wind & Fire
"Feel the Same"	2007	Groove Armada featuring Angie Stone	Soundboy Rock
"Life's Quest"	2012	8Ball featuring Angie Stone	Life's Quest
"Love T.K.O."	2016	Teddy Pendergrass featuring Angie Stone	Duets – Love & Soul
"Receipts"	2016	Dave Hollister featuring Angie Stone	The Manuscript
"Don't Stop the Music"	2018	Reel People featuring Angie Stone	Retroflection
"The Human Stone"	2019	KDA featuring Angie Stone	

=== Other collaborations ===
Title	Year	Artist	Album	Collaboration
"Baby Cries (Ay Yah)"	1987	Jill Jones	"G-Spot" (single)	Songwriting
"The Midnight Special"	1992	Buckwheat Zydeco	On Track	Background vocals
"Hey Joe"	1992	Buckwheat Zydeco	On Track	Background vocals
"Heaven Help"	1993	Lenny Kravitz	Are You Gonna Go My Way	Background vocals
"We Had a Good Thing Goin'"	1994	Debelah	Debelah	Songwriting
"Jonz in My Bonz"	1995	D'Angelo	Brown Sugar	Songwriting
"Let It Go"	1995	Maysa	Maysa	Songwriting
—	1998	Lenny Kravitz	5	Background vocals
—	1998	D'Angelo	Live at the Jazz Cafe	Background vocals
"Crazy Bout U"	1998	Solo	4 Bruthas and a Bass	Songwriting
"Playa Playa"	2000	D'Angelo	Voodoo	Songwriting
"Send It On"	2000	D'Angelo	Voodoo	Songwriting
"Greatdayndamornin'/Booty"	2000	D'Angelo	Voodoo	Songwriting
"Africa"	2000	D'Angelo	Voodoo	Songwriting
"Won't Be a Fool"	2000	Alex Bugnon	...As Promised	Songwriting
"Call on Me"	2000	Terry Ellis	Disappearing Acts soundtrack	Songwriting
"Someday"	2000	Toshinobu Kubota	Nothing But Your Love	Songwriting
"Pu Pu"	2000	Toshinobu Kubota	Nothing But Your Love	Songwriting
"Shame"	2000	Toshinobu Kubota	Nothing But Your Love	Songwriting
"Something Inside"	2001	Boney James featuring Dave Hollister	Ride	Songwriting
"Doing What I Can"	2002	Raphael Saadiq	Instant Vintage	Background vocals
"OPH"	2002	Raphael Saadiq	Instant Vintage	Songwriting
"I Got What You Need"	2002	Shabazz	Better Day	Songwriting
"Jehovah Jirah" (Live)	2002	Knagui	Meaning of Love	Songwriting
"The Prayer" (Live)	2002	Josh Groban	Josh Groban IN CONCERT	Live Duet
"Fell in Love with a Boy"	2003	Joss Stone	The Soul Sessions	Background vocals
"Love of My Life Worldwide"	2003	Erykah Badu	Worldwide Underground	Songwriting
"Tired of the Game"	2004	Roy Tyler & New Directions	Three Way Calling	Songwriting
"Security"	2004	Joss Stone	Mind Body & Soul	Fender Rhodes
"Beating of My Heart"	2004	Toshinobu Kubota	Time to Share	Songwriting, background vocals, producer
"Shadows of Your Love"	2004	Toshinobu Kubota	Time to Share	Songwriting, background vocals, producer
"It's Time"	2004	Toshinobu Kubota	Time to Share	Songwriting, background vocals, producer

=== Soundtrack appearances ===
Title	Year	Film
"Everyday"	1997	Money Talks
"Holding Back the Years"	2000	Love & Basketball
"My Lovin' Will Give You Something"	2000	Shaft
"Slippery Shoes"	2000	Bamboozled
"Get to Know You Better"	2000	Disappearing Acts
"Makin' Me Feel"	2001	Dr. Dolittle 2
"20 Dollars"	2001	Ali
"Groove Me"	2002	Austin Powers in Goldmember
"Bring Your Heart" (featuring Diamond Stone)	2002	Brown Sugar
"Rain Down" (with Eddie Levert of The O'Jays)	2003	The Fighting Temptations
"Time to Come Home" (with Beyoncé and Melba Moore)	2003	The Fighting Temptations
"Miracle of Love" (with BeBe Winans)	2004	The Passion of the Christ
"Different Directions"	2006	Diary of a Mad Black Woman

== Music videography ==
List of music videos as lead artist
Title	Year	Director	Ref.
"No More Rain (In This Cloud)"	1999	Andrew Dosunmu	
"Life Story"	2000	—N/a	
"Everyday"	2000	Little X	
"Brotha"	2001	Chris Robinson	
"Brotha (Part II)"	2001	Chris Robinson	
"Wish I Didn't Miss You"	2002	Kevin Bray	
"I Wanna Thank Ya"	2004	Jessy Terrero	
"Baby"	2007	Gina Prince-Bythewood	
"Sometimes"	2008	Felicia D. Henderson	
"I Ain't Hearin' U"	2009	Billie Woodruff	
"Do What U Goota Do"	2012	Kai Crawford	
"2 Bad Habits"	2015	Phil Reed	
"Love the Feeling"	2023	Charles West	
"Good Man"	2023	Charles West	
