= Do What You Gotta Do (disambiguation) =

Do What You Gotta Do may refer to:

== Music ==
=== Albums ===
- Do What You Gotta Do, by Bobby Vee, 1967

=== Songs ===
- Do What You Gotta Do, by Jimmy Webb, 1967
- Do What You Gotta Do, by Garth Brooks, 2000
- Do What U Gotta Do, by Angie Stone, 2012

== See also ==
- Do What You Wanna Do, debut single by T-Connection
- Do What You Do (disambiguation)
