= The Language of Love =

The Language of Love or language of love may refer to:

- Language of Love (Swedish: Kärlekens språk) 1969 Swedish sex-education film
- The French language or Italian language

== Music ==
=== Albums ===
- Language of Love, 1961 charting album by John D. Loudermilk
- The Language of Love (album), 1963 album by Jerry Vale
- The Language of Love, 2003 album by Carol Welsman
- The Language of Love, classical album by Duo Trobairitz - Faye Newton (soprano) and Hazel Brooks (vielle)
- The Language of Love, 2014 album by Julia Fordham

=== Songs ===
- "Language of Love", hit song by John D. Loudermilk (US No. 32, UK Top 20) in 1961
- "The Language of Love", hit song by Dan Fogelberg (US No.13 hit single) from the album Windows and Walls 1984
- "Language of Love", by Who's Who from Ulterior Motives (The Lost Album), 2024

== See also ==
- Love Language (disambiguation)
