= Full Circle (Angie Stone album) =

Studio album by Angie Stone
- Released: July 12, 2019
- Studios: The Writer's Room Recording (Atlanta, Georgia) (Note: Tracks 1–5 and 7–10); Lair (Los Angeles, California)
- Length: 35:54
- Labels: Conjunction; Cleopatra
- Producers: Terrance Abney; Marcella Brailsford; Sheldon "Coz" Ellerby; Xavier Gordon; KayGee; Walter Millsap III; Balewa Muhammad; Candice C. Nelson; Jason Rome; Willie "Chuck" Shivers; Tubbyoung; Teak Underdue

Angie Stone chronology
Covered in Soul (2016)	Full Circle (2019)	Love Language (2023)

Singles from Full Circle
- 1. "Dinosaur" Released: March 13, 2019

Full Circle is the ninth studio album by American singer Angie Stone. Initially set for a June 7 release, it was released on July 12, 2019, by Conjunction Entertainment and Cleopatra Records.

== Background ==
In 2014, Angie Stone released her seventh studio album, Dream. A top three success on the US Top R&B/Hip-Hop Albums chart, the album marked a turning point for Stone who had been uncertain whether she should continue her music career after the lukewarm commercial response to her previous two albums Unexpected (2009) and Rich Girl (2012), both of which had failed to chart within the upper half of the US Billboard 200. Barely nine months after the release of Dream, she collaborated with Peter Amato and Jürgen Engler on her next project Covered in Soul. Largely ignored upon its release, the cover album earned mixed to negative reviews from music critic and failed to chart.

== Promotion ==
"Dinosaur" was released as the first single from Full Circle on March 13, 2019.

== Critical reception ==
Professional ratings
Review scores
Source	Rating
AllMusic	3/5 stars

AllMusic editor Andy Kellman rated the album three out of five stars. He found that on Full Circle "Stone is at her best here when she is granted material that wouldn't make half as much sense handled by any other artist. These moments include a burning and conflicted throwback ballad with Jaheim, the strutting summertime groove "Perfect," and the reflectively frank "Neverbride"." He noted however, that "it gets a little too candid on "Grits," a graphic slow jam in which Stone acts as a voyeuristic sex therapist for a younger couple. The album's slightly reedy mix unfortunately diminishes the richness of Stone's voice." Diamond Alexis, writing for BET.com, called Full Circle the "masterful neo-soul nostalgia that 2019 needs." She remarked that "for her eighth studio album, the vocal legend marries classic neo-soul with the contemporary tropes of today's rhythm and blues [...] Graced by her deep soul-driven vocals and natural storytelling talent, Full Circle embraces the trials and the triumphs in the everlasting journey of womanhood." Dave Burke from British music magazine Blues & Soul declared it an "excellent new album [...] with plenty to offer."

== Chart performance ==
Full Circle became Stone's first album of original material to neither reach the US Billboard 200 nor the Top R&B/Hip-Hop Albums chart. It however became her second album to enter the Independent Albums chart, debuting and peaking at number 34 in the week ending July 27, 2019.

== Track listing ==
Full Circle track listing
No.	Title	Writer(s)	Producer(s)	Length
1.	"Perfect"	Walter Millsap III; Candice C. Nelson; Kier Gist; Terrance Abney; Marcella Brailsford; William Patterson; Balewa Muhammad; Sheldon Ellerby; Joel Kipnis	Millsap; Nelson; KayGee; Abney; Brailsford; Muhammad	3:48
2.	"Same Number"	Millsap; Nelson; Muhammad; Rick Watford; Toby Davis; James Jones; Ellerby; Kipnis	Millsap; Sheldon "Coz" Ellerby; Nelson; Muhammad	3:46
3.	"Dinosaur"	Millsap; Nelson; Muhammad; Teak Underdue; Ellerby; Kipnis	Millsap; Underdue; Nelson; Muhammad	3:27
4.	"Gonna Have to Be You" (featuring Jaheim)	Millsap; Nelson; Muhammad; Underdue; Ellerby; Kipnis	Millsap; Underdue; Nelson; Muhammad	3:58
5.	"Neverbride"	Millsap; Nelson; Xavier T. Gordon; Ellerby; Kipnis	Millsap; Gordon; Nelson; Muhammad	3:28
6.	"Ain't Nobody Got Time for That"	Willie "Chuck" Shivers; Angie Stone; Latasha M. Williams	Shivers	3:58
7.	"Recipe"	Millsap; Nelson; Ellerby; Davis; Rashon Murphy; Muhammad; Kipnis	Millsap; Ellerby; Nelson; Muhammad	3:25
8.	"Grits"	Millsap; Nelson; Gordon; Muhammad; Ellerby; Kipnis	Millsap; Gordon; Nelson; Muhammad	3:35
9.	"While We Still Can"	Millsap; Nelson; Muhammad; Jason Rome; Calvin M. Frazier; Ellerby; Kipnis	Millsap; Rome; Tubbyoung; Nelson; Muhammad	3:51
10.	"Let Me Know"	Millsap; Nelson; Gordon; Muhammad; Ellerby; Kipnis	Millsap; Gordon; Nelson; Muhammad	2:43
Total length:				35:54

== Charts ==
Chart performance for Full Circle
Chart (2019)	Peak position
US Independent Albums (Billboard)	34
