= Walter Millsap III =

American singer-songwriter

- Also known as: Lil Walt
- Born: Walter Millsap III
- Occupations: Singer; songwriter; record producer; rapper; musical director; music executive

Walter Worth Millsap III, sometimes also credited as Lil Walt, is an American singer, songwriter, record producer, rapper and music executive.

== Career ==
In 1997, as a teenager, Millsap inked a publishing deal with Jon Platt at EMI and signed a management contract with Jay Brown of Elektra Records. In the early 2000s, he became a protégé of producer Timbaland, with whom he engineered "Heatburn" on Alicia Keys' second album The Diary of Alicia Keys (2003). His work on the song later earned him a Grammy Award nomination in the Album of the Year category. Along with Timbaland, Millsap also co-wrote songs for artists such as Jennifer Lopez and Kiley Dean. In 2004, he co-wrote the majority of Brandy's fourth studio album Afrodisiac.

In the late 2000s, Millsap ventured into artist development and founded his own label Conjunction Entertainment. He teamed up with Streamline Records chief Vincent Herbert to find members for a boy group which was later named Mindless Behaviour. Millsap signed them to Interscope Records and produced their top ten debut album Number 1 Girl. In the 2010, he would sign singers Angie Stone and Dave Hollister, both of whom he had worked before, to Conjunction Entertainment. Stone would release three out of four final studio albums, before her death, with Millsap, who co-wrote and produce most of her material and took over Stone's management.

== Written and produced songs ==
Name of song, featured performers, originating album, year released and specified role.
Year	Title	Artist	Album	Songwriter	Producer		Ref(s).
Year	Title	Artist	Album	Songwriter	Primary	Secondary	Ref(s).
1999	"He'll Arrive (Coming Back)"	Yolanda Adams	Mountain High... Valley Low	check	check		
2000	"Don't Take My Girl Away"	Dave Hollister	Chicago '85... The Movie		check		
2002	"I've Been Changed"	Karen Clark Sheard	2nd Chance	check	check		
2002	"All Because of You"	Next	The Next Episode	check	check		
2002	"Girl, Lady, Woman"	Next	The Next Episode	check	check		
2002	"Lights Out"	Next	The Next Episode	check	check		
2002	"As Long as U Know"	RL	RL: Ements	check	check		
2002	"Elements"	RL	RL: Ements	check	check		
2002	""K.N.O.W."	RL	RL: Ements	check	check		
2002	"Tempted"	RL	RL: Ements	check	check		
2002	"Thank You"	RL	RL: Ements	check	check		
2002	"Whatcha Wanna Do"	RL	RL: Ements	check	check		
2003	"Doing Me Wrong"	Lil Mo	Meet the Girl Next Door	check	check		
2003	"Make Me a Song"	Kiley Dean	—	check			
2003	"Insane"	Timbaland & Magoo	Under Construction, Part II	check			
2004	"Finally"	Brandy	Afrodisiac	check			
2004	"Focus"	Brandy	Afrodisiac	check			
2004	"I Tried"	Brandy	Afrodisiac	check			
2004	"How I Feel"	Brandy	Afrodisiac	check	check		
2004	"Nodding Off"	Brandy	Afrodisiac	check			
2004	"Should I Go"	Brandy	Afrodisiac	check			
2004	"Turn It Up"	Brandy	Afrodisiac	check			
2004	"Who Is She 2 U"	Brandy	Afrodisiac	check			
2004	"You're Gonna Get It"	Angie Stone	Stone Love	check	check		
2004	"Heartburn"	Alicia Keys	The Diary of Alicia Keys	check			
2004	"By Your Side"	Timbaland, Kiley Dean, Utada	Unity	check			
2005	"Could It Be"	Tweet	It's Me Again	check	check		
2005	"Long as You Come Home"	Brooke Valentine	Chain Letter	check			
2005	"He'll Be Back"	Jennifer Lopez	Rebirth	check			
2006	"No More"	LeToya	LeToya	check	check		
2006	"She Don't"	LeToya	LeToya	check	check		
2006	"Resentment"	Beyoncé	B'Day	check	check		
2007	"Something I Wanna Give You"	Sunshine Anderson	Sunshine at Midnight	check	check		
2007	"So Right for Me"	Marques Houston	Veteran	check	check		
2007	"Fantasy"	Timbaland	Shock Value	check	check		
2007	"2 Man Show"	Timbaland	Shock Value	check			
2009	"Return the Favor"	Keri Hilson	In a Perfect World...	check		check	
2011	"#1 Girl"	Mindless Behavior	Number 1 Girl	check	check		
2011	"Future"	Mindless Behavior	Number 1 Girl	check		check	
2011	"Girls Talkin' Bout"	Mindless Behavior	Number 1 Girl	check		check	
2011	"Hello"	Mindless Behavior	Number 1 Girl	check	check		
2011	"Hook It Up"	Mindless Behavior	Number 1 Girl	check	check		
2011	"Mrs. Right"	Mindless Behavior	Number 1 Girl	check	check		
2011	"My Girl"	Mindless Behavior	Number 1 Girl	check	check		
2011	"Missing You"	Mindless Behavior	Number 1 Girl	check	check		
2015	"2 Bad Habits"	Angie Stone	Dream	check	check		
2015	"Begin Again"	Angie Stone	Dream	check	check		
2015	"Clothes Don't Make a Man"	Angie Stone	Dream	check	check		
2015	"Didn't Break Me"	Angie Stone	Dream	check	check		
2015	"Dollar Bill"	Angie Stone	Dream	check	check		
2015	"Dream"	Angie Stone	Dream	check	check		
2015	"Forget About Me"	Angie Stone	Dream	check	check		
2015	"Magnet"	Angie Stone	Dream	check	check		
2015	"Quits"	Angie Stone	Dream	check	check		
2016	"Barbershop"	Dave Hollister	The Manuscript	check	check		
2016	"Blind"	Dave Hollister	The Manuscript	check	check		
2016	"Creation (H.E.R.)"	Dave Hollister	The Manuscript	check	check		
2016	"Definition of a Woman"	Dave Hollister	The Manuscript	check	check		
2016	"Geometry"	Dave Hollister	The Manuscript	check	check		
2016	"Let Him"	Dave Hollister	The Manuscript	check	check		
2016	"Ooh Ya Ya"	Dave Hollister	The Manuscript	check	check		
2016	"One Great Love"	Dave Hollister	The Manuscript	check	check		
2016	"Receipts"	Dave Hollister	The Manuscript	check	check		
2016	"Shortage"	Dave Hollister	The Manuscript	check	check		
2019	"Dinosaur"	Angie Stone	Full Circle	check	check		
2019	"Grits"	Angie Stone	Full Circle	check	check		
2019	"Gonna Have to Be You"	Angie Stone	Full Circle	check	check		
2019	"Let Me Know"	Angie Stone	Full Circle	check	check		
2019	"Neverbride"	Angie Stone	Full Circle	check	check		
2019	"Perfect"	Angie Stone	Full Circle	check	check		
2019	"Recipe"	Angie Stone	Full Circle	check	check		
2019	"Same Number"	Angie Stone	Full Circle	check	check		
2019	"Magnet"	Angie Stone	Full Circle	check	check		
2023	"All I Need"	Angie Stone	Love Language	check	check		
2023	"Good Man"	Angie Stone	Love Language	check	check		
2023	"The Gym"	Angie Stone	Love Language	check	check		
2023	"High"	Angie Stone	Love Language	check	check		
2023	"Love Is Real"	Angie Stone	Love Language	check	check		
2023	"Love Language"	Angie Stone	Love Language	check	check		
2023	"Love the Feeling"	Angie Stone	Love Language	check	check		
2023	"Old Thang Back"	Angie Stone	Love Language	check	check		
2024	"Because of Your Grace"	Vanessa Bell Armstrong	Today	check	check		
2024	"Everything You Are"	Vanessa Bell Armstrong	Today	check	check		
2024	"I Trust in You"	Vanessa Bell Armstrong	Today	check	check		
2024	"Lift Him Up"	Vanessa Bell Armstrong	Today	check			
2024	"Miracles"	Vanessa Bell Armstrong	Today	check	check		
2024	"Never Ending Grace"	Vanessa Bell Armstrong	Today	check			
2024	"Satisfied with Me"	Vanessa Bell Armstrong	Today	check	check		
2024	"Today"	Vanessa Bell Armstrong	Today	check	check		
2024	"Until the End"	Vanessa Bell Armstrong	Today	check	check		
