= Vertical Hold (American group) =

American musical group

- Genres: R&B; hip hop; neo soul; jazz
- Years active: 1988–1995
- Label: A&M
- Past members: David Bright; Willie Bruno, Jr.; Gordon Mack III; Angie B. Stone

Vertical Hold was an American musical group, consisting of vocalist Angie Stone, David Bright, and Willie Bruno. Initially a quartet, also involving Gordon Mack III, and active from 1988, the trio came to prominence with their second single "Seems You're Much Too Busy" and disbanded after the release of their second studio album with A&M Records, Head First (1995).

== History ==
=== 1988–1991: Early beginnings ===
Following her departure from female hip hop group The Sequence, Angie B. Stone made several attempts to start a solo career. She began writing solo material and booked studio time at her own expense. Through the studio's engineer Gordon Mack III, Stone was introduced to musicians David Bright and Willie Bruno, Jr., who were impressed by her songwriting abilities and asked her to write on their songs. While she initially saw the collaboration as just an opportunity to work in the studio for free and have access to a team of musicians, it eventually led to the formation of the R&B/hip hop quartet It's Us. Renamed Vertical Hold, they released their first single "Summertime" in 1988 through Criminal Records. The song peaked at number 82 on the US Hot Black Singles chart. In the same year, the group wrote and produced "Knockout" for American rapper Special K. In 1989, the group wrote and produced "What Am I Gonna Do About Your Love?" for singer Andrea Tafuri.

=== 1992–1995: A&M Records, A Matter of Time, and Head First ===
Following Mack's withdrawal from the band, Stone, Bright and Bruno managed to secure another recording deal with A&M Records. On June 22, 1993, they released their debut album A Matter of Time. The album peaked at number 33 on the US Top R&B Albums chart, and sold more than 62,000 copies domestically. The album's lead single "Seems You're Much Too Busy" peaked at number 17 on US Hot R&B Singles chart. Their follow up singles "A.S.A.P." and "Matter of Time" performed commercially less successful, with the former peaking at number 83 on US Hot R&B Singles chart.

Vertical Hold's second album, 1995's Head First, reached number 67 on the US Top R&B Albums chart. Its first and only single "Love Today" peaked at number 49 on the Hot R&B Singles. The group disbanded after being disappointed by the mechanisms of the industry.

== Disbandment and aftermath ==
In late 1995, Stone began working with music producers Gerry DeVeaux and Charlie Mole as the featured vocalist for their group Devox. On September 25, 1996, the group released their only album titled Devox Featuring Angie B. Stone, exclusively in Japan. The album featured a few songs by Vertical Hold as well as new songs that Stone recorded. Devox disbanded after Stone declined to become a full member of the group as she wanted to pursue a solo career. The project eventually caught the attention of Arista Records A&R manager Peter Edge, which lead to Stone being offered a solo recording contract with Arista Records.

== Member timeline ==
- Angie B. Stone – lead vocals (1987–1995)
- David Bright – drums, keyboardist, vocals (1987–1995)
- Willie Bruno, Jr. – keyboardist, vibraphonist, vocals (1987–1995)
- Gordon Mack III – programming and engineering (1987–1992)

== Discography ==
=== Studio albums ===
List of albums, with selected chart positions and sales figures
Title	Album details	Peak chart positions	Sales
Title	Album details	US R&B	Sales
A Matter of Time	Released: June 22, 1993; Format: CD, LP, cassette; Label: A&M	33	US: 62,000
Head First	Released: May 31, 1995; Format: CD, LP, cassette; Label: A&M	67	

=== Singles ===
List of singles, with selected chart positions
Title	Year	Peak chart positions	Albums
Title	Year	US R&B	Albums
"Summertime"	1988	82	Non-album single
"Seems You're Much Too Busy"	1992	17	A Matter of Time
"A.S.A.P."	1993	83	A Matter of Time
"Matter of Time"	1993	—	A Matter of Time
"Love Today"	1995	49	Head First
