= What You Do =

What You Do may refer to:

- What You Do (Margaret song), 2017
- What You Do (Margaret Bell song), 1992
- What You Do, a 2009 single by Chrisette Michele from Epiphany

== See also ==
- What You Do (Bastard), a 1998 single by Stellar*
- Do What You Do (disambiguation)
