= Love Language (disambiguation) =

Love Language is a concept popularised by Gary Chapman's 1992 book The Five Love Languages.

Love Language may also refer to:

- Love Language (Teddy Pendergrass album), 1984
- Love Language (Angie Stone album), 2023
- Love Language (film), upcoming film directed by Joey Power
- "Love Language", a 2015 album by Wouter Kellerman
- "Love Language", a song by Ariana Grande from the 2020 album Positions
- "Love Language", a song by Crooked Colours from the 2020 album Tomorrows
- "Love Language", a song by Catriona Gray which is self-written
- "Love Language", a song by Queen Naija from the 2022 album Missunderstood
- "Love Language", a song by SZA from the 2022 album SOS
- "Love Language", a 2025 song by Tomorrow X Together

== See also ==
- The Love Language, American indie rock band
