= Covered in Soul =

Studio album by Angie Stone
- Released: August 5, 2016
- Length: 46:15
- Label: Goldenlane
- Producer: Peter Amato; Jürgen Engler

Angie Stone chronology
Dream (2015)	Covered in Soul (2016)	Full Circle (2019)

Singles from Covered in Soul
- 1. "These Eyes" Released: January 22, 2016

Covered in Soul is the eighth studio album by American recording artist Angie Stone, released on August 5, 2016, by Goldenlane Records. A cover album, it marked her first release with the label following short stints with Stax Records, Saguaro Road, and Shanachie Records. Preceded by the single "These Eyes", a cover of the same-titled The Guess Who song, it failed to chart.

== Critical reception ==
Professional ratings
Review scores
Source	Rating
AllMusic	2/5 stars
The Observer	2/5 stars

Covered in Soul earned largely mixed to negative reviews. Michael Cragg from The Guardian rated the album two out of five stars. He called Covered in Soul a "creative curveball" and added: "Unfortunately, too often the songs are hampered by their listless production, Stone's honeyed vocals trying their best to inject some life into proceedings. Tacked on to the end are three reworkings of Stone's own songs, including the ever excellent "Brotha," but this is one for completists only." AllMusic editor Andy Kellman gave the album two out of five stars. He found that "the nine covers [...] plink and plod with none of the depth of Stone's prior studio albums. Stone sounds like she's enjoying herself, though the performances come across as casual, sometimes verging on spirited karaoke [...] Stone's previous album was issued by Shanachie, a label with a catalog deep in covers sets executed with session musicians. It's unfortunate that she didn't remain with them to carry out this concept."

Tirhaka Love from Spectrum Culture wrote that "it's unfortunate that Covered in Soul, couldn't match the meticulous craftsmanship and boisterous energy overflowing" on Stone's previous album Dream. He noted that this is "primarily a result of false advertising: The record doesn't sound soulful. Instead, Covered in Soul suffers from low production value — a departure from Dream — and Stone doesn't sound as inspired by the artists she covers as she'd like us to believe." Fabian Wolff, writing for German newspaper Die Zeit, called Covered in Soul a "truly sad album, one of the saddest of the year." He remarked that "today, her voice is rougher, sandier, like many soul singers after 20 years of career. With the right producers and the right material, this could still be the beginning of a great second half of her career [...] unfortunately, the same Europop lounge paste is poured over everything."

== Track listing ==
Covered in Soul track listing
No.	Title	Writer(s)	Original Artist(a)	Length
1.	"These Eyes"	Randy Bachman; Burton Cummings	The Guess Who	3:40
2.	"Smiling Faces Sometimes"	Norman Whitfield; Barrett Strong	The Undisputed Truth	3:57
3.	"In the Air Tonight"	Phil Collins	Phil Collins	4:05
4.	"I Believe (When I Fall in Love It Will Be Forever)"	Stevie Wonder; Yvonne Wright	Stevie Wonder	3:23
5.	"O-o-h Child"	Stan Vincent	Five Stairsteps	3:05
6.	"Every 1's a Winner" (with Eric Gales)		Hot Chocolate	4:14
7.	"Red Red Wine"	Neil Diamond	Neil Diamond	2:56
8.	"Is This Love"	Bob Marley	Bob Marley and the Wailers	3:48
9.	"It's Too Late"	Carole King; Toni Stern	Carole King	3:42
10.	"Wish I Didn't Miss You" (Soul Sessions)	Andrea Martin; Ivan Matias; Leon Huff; Gene McFadden; John Whitehead	Angie Stone	4:02
11.	"Baby" (Soul Sessions)	Angie Stone; Corey Tatum; K. Norton; Curtis Mayfield	Angie Stone	5:01
12.	"Brotha" (Soul Sessions)	Stone; Raphael Saadiq; Harold Lilly; Glenn Standridge; Robert C. Ozuna	Angie Stone	3:56
Total length:				46:15

== Release history ==
Covered in Soul release history
Region	Date	Format	Label	Ref(s)
Various	August 5, 2016	CD; digital download; streaming	Goldenlane	
