= Dream (Angie Stone album) =

Studio album by Angie Stone
- Released: November 6, 2015
- Length: 36:42
- Label: Shanachie
- Producers: Sheldon "Coz" Ellerby; The Heavyweights; Walter Millsap III; Balewa Muhammad; Candice Nelson; Monte Neuble; Jason Penncock; Tim Stewart; Teak Underdue

Angie Stone chronology
Rich Girl (2012)	Dream (2015)	Covered in Soul (2016)

Singles from Dream
- 1. "2 Bad Habits" Released: September 11, 2015

Dream is the seventh studio album by the American singer Angie Stone. It was released on November 6, 2015, by Shanachie Entertainment in collaboration with Conjunction Entertainment and TopNotch Music. Following short stints with Stax Records and Saguaro Road Records, Stone signed with Shanachie through a partnership with frequent collaborator Walter Millsap III. Millsap and Stone co-wrote the majority of the album with a core group that included former The Clutch members Candice Nelson and Balewa Muhammad as well as the producers Teak Underdue and The Heavyweights.

The album received generally positive reviews from music critics, who called the record "another solid and empowering effort" and felt that it was very much in line with Stone's discography. Dream debuted and peaked at number 59 on the US Billboard 200 and marked Stone's return to the Top R&B/Hip-Hop Albums top five, peaking at number three. Several promotional singles were issued in support of the album, including "Dream" which appeared in the TV One film For the Love of Ruth. Lead single "2 Bad Habits" became a top 20 hit on Billboard's Adult R&B Songs chart.

== Background ==
In 2009, Stone released her fifth studio album Unexpected, her second effort with Stax Records, followed by Rich Girl, her 2012 debut with Saguaro Road Rhythm. Both projects failed to reprise the commercial success of previous releases and had significantly shorter promotional runs, eventually ending her association with each company. Disillusioned by label executives who Stone felt lacked ideas on what to do with an artist her age and "tired of putting out great music, not getting any recognition for it," the singer seriously thought about quitting her music career after a much-publicised altercation with her daughter Diamond and a two season stint on the TV One reality show R&B Divas: Atlanta had made her believe that "the industry only wanted to hear about bad news, not good news."

It was not until producer Walter "DJ Walt" Millsap III, with whom Stone had previously worked on her third album Stone Love (2004), persuaded her to work with her on a new project that she decided against retirement. Millsap consulted a team of frequent collaborators to work with him and Stone, including former The Clutch members Candice Nelson and Balewa Muhammad as well as Teak Underdue and The Heavyweights. Calling him the "brainchild" behind Dream, Stone said in a 2015 interview: "I really have to give Walter Milsap the credit for being the inspiration behind the project and everything about it [...] I was just the voice. Candice Nelson was the pen and there were so many other components to the production. Dream is an amazing project and it's not just the best of the Dream but it's running neck and neck with Mahogany Soul."

== Promotion ==
The release of the album was preceded by the promotional single "Dream," released digitally on May 8, 2015. The song appeared in the TV One film For the Love of Ruth, based on the biblical story of Ruth and broadcast on May 9, 2015, co-starring Stone alongside Loretta Devine and Gary Dourdan. A music video for "Dream," interspliced with clips from the movie, was released on May 6, 2015.

"2 Bad Habits," Dream's lead single, was released on September 11, 2015, while it accompanying music video was released on October 6, 2015. The song peaked at number 18 on Billboard's Adult R&B Songs chart. On October 3, the album was made available for pre-order with another promotional single, "Magnet," open for downloading. On December 5, 2015, Stone revealed on her official Facebook page that further singles would be chosen by fans through a seven-day poll on Singersroom.com, though none of her options were later issued as a single.

== Critical reception ==
Professional ratings
Review scores
Source	Rating
AllMusic	3.5/5 stars
Exclaim!	8/10
Music Connection	8/10

Dream received generally positive reviews from music critics. AllMusic editor Andy Kellman found that "while it doesn't sound as big-budgeted as her earlier releases, Dream is very much in line with Stone's discography, neither straight retro-soul nor pop-oriented contemporary R&B, though it does lean closer to the former." He called the album "a concise album where the singer covers a lot of ground, batting her eyelashes, declaring devotion, seeking affirmation, repairing a relationship, and scolding an immature lover". Melody Charles from SoulTracks felt that "unlike [Stone's] 2012 CD, the enjoyable but overlooked Rich Girl, the tracks here employ some vintage touches, yet retain modern flair as Angie offers glimpses into the present and past."

Matt Bauer of Exclaim! gave the album an 8/10 rating and wrote that its themes of personal and romantic renewal as well as tackling the rocky terrain of failed relationships never seem redundant over the listen, calling the record "another solid and empowering effort". In his review for Music Connection, Jonathan Widran found that with Dream Stone "lays a powerful, emotional and spiritual foundation even when she's floating dreamily in atmospheric old-school soul textures. Deftly balancing the passion with the pain, she artfully—and with sensuality to spare—traverses the classic sounds she emerged with in the late ‘70s and created for D’Angelo in the ‘90s with more contemporary driving beats. Stone gives R&B fans of all generations something to dream on." In his review for YouKnowIGotSoul.com Edward T. Bowser called Dreams an "ode to the travails of love, delivered by a woman who has been through it all." He found that it was "very concise, thankfully not overstaying its welcome."

== Commercial performance ==
The album debuted at number 59 on the US Billboard 200 and number three on the Top R&B/Hip-Hop Albums chart, with approximately 9,000 copies sold in the week ending November 12, 2015, according to Nielsen Music. This marked Stone's highest debut on both charts since her fourth album, The Art of Love & War (2007).

== Track listing ==
Dream track listing
No.	Title	Writer(s)	Producer(s)	Length
1.	"Dollar Bill"	Walter Millsap III; Candice Nelson; Balewa Muhammad; Perry Mapp; Angie Stone; Tenille Johnson	Millsap; Sheldon "Coz" Ellerby; Nelson; Muhammad	3:15
2.	"Begin Again" (featuring Dave Hollister)	Millsap; Nelson; Muhammad; Mapp; Monte Neuble; Tim Stewart; Stone	Millsap; Neuble; Stewart; Nelson; Muhammad	4:03
3.	"Clothes Don't Make a Man"	Millsap; Nelson; Muhammad; Mapp; Stone; Albert Walton; Teak Underdue	Millsap; Underdue; Nelson; Muhammad	2:36
4.	"Magnet"	Millsap; Nelson; Muhammad; Mapp; Xavier T. Gordon; Stone	Millsap; Gordon; Nelson; Muhammad	4:06
5.	"Dream"	Millsap; Nelson; Muhammad; Mapp; Underdue; Stone	Millsap; Underdue; Nelson; Muhammad	3:29
6.	"2 Bad Habits"	Millsap; Nelson; Muhammad; Mapp; Underdue; Stone	Millsap; Underdue; Nelson; Muhammad	3:57
7.	"Quits"	Millsap; Nelson; Muhammad; Mapp; Underdue; Stone	Millsap; Underdue; Nelson; Muhammad	3:12
8.	"Think it Over"	Stone; Jamie Jones; Jack Kugell; Jason Penncock; Robert Louis Daniel	The Heavyweights; Pennock; Stone	4:22
9.	"Forget About Me"	Millsap; Nelson; Muhammad; Mapp; Underdue; Stone	Millsap; Underdue; Nelson; Muhammad	3:42
10.	"Didn't Break Me"	Millsap; Nelson; Muhammad; Mapp; Underdue; Stone	Millsap; Underdue; Nelson; Muhammad	3:38
Total length:				36:42

== Personnel ==
Credits adapted from the liner notes of Dream.

- Charles Amos – assistant
- Bobby & The Heavyweights – arranger, engineer, vocal producer
- John Cranfield – assistant
- Toby Davis – keyboards
- Sheldon Ellerby – engineer, producer
- Xavier Gordon – instrumentation, producer
- John Greenham – mastering
- Lavi Hendin – art direction
- Dave Hollister – vocals
- Breyona Holt – photography
- Dae Howerton – photo editing
- Adam Johnson – bass
- Jamie Jones – instrumentation
- David Lopez – mixing
- Perry Mapp – assistant
- Alec Jace Millsap – assistant
- Walter Millsap III – engineer, executive producer, producer
- Walter Millsap IV – assistant, executive producer
- Peter Mokran – mixing
- Monte Neuble – instrumentation, producer
- Balewa Muhammad – assistant, engineer, executive producer, producer
- Candice Nelson – executive producer, coordinator, backing vocalist
- Jason Pennock – instrumentation, producer
- Brian Peters – executive producer, project coordinator
- Jim Reid – horn
- David Rideau – mixing
- Tim Stewart – guitar, instrumentation, producer
- Angie Stone – executive producer, vocals
- Teak Underdue – executive producer, instrumentation, producer
- Rick Watford – guitar

== Charts ==
Weekly chart performance for Dream
Chart (2015)	Peak position
US Billboard 200	59
US Independent Albums (Billboard)	5
US Top R&B/Hip-Hop Albums (Billboard)	3

== Release history ==
Release history and formats for Dream
Region	Date	Format(s)	Label	Ref.
United States	November 6, 2015	CD; digital download; streaming	Shanachie; Conjunction; TopNotch	
