= I Ain't Hearin' U =

Single by Angie Stone

from the album Unexpected
- Released: October 12, 2009
- Length: 3:27
- Label: Concord; Stax
- Songwriter(s): Steven White; Juanita Wynn; Willie Lester; Rodney Brown
- Producer(s): Steven "Supe" White

Angie Stone singles chronology
"Pop Pop" (2008)	"I Ain't Hearin' U" (2009)	"Free" (2010)

"I Ain't Hearin' U" is a song by American singer Angie Stone. It was written by Steven "Supe" White and Juanita Wynn and produced by the former for Stone's fifth studio album Unexpected (2009). The song contains a sample from the 1981 record "What Are You Waiting for?" by American R&B singer Evelyn "Champagne" King. Due to the sample, original writers Willie Lester and Rodney Brown are also credited as songwriters. Released by Stax Records as the lead single from Unexpected, "I Ain't Hearin' U" reached number 14 on Billboard's US Adult R&B Songs chart.

== Background ==
"I Ain't Hearin' U" was written by Juanita Wynn for Angie Stone's fifth studio album Unexpected (2009), her second album with Stax Records. Production on the song was overseen by Steven "Supe" White. The song contains a sample of the record "What Are You Waiting for?" from American R&B singer Evelyn "Champagne" King's 1981 album I'm in Love, as written by Willie Lester and Rodney Brown. Due to the sample, original writers Willie Lester and Rodney Brown are also credited as songwriters on "I Ain't Hearin' U." In a December 2009 interview, Stone commented on the uptempo song: "This song is actually about five or six years old [...] Juanita and I kept going back and forth about it. I kept asking her what she wanted to do with it, and she kept telling me it was up to me. Finally, I just took it and ran with it. I think it was just a matter of the time being right."

== Critical reception ==
"I Ain't Hearin' U" earned generally positive reviews from music critics. AllMusic editor Thom Jurek ranked the song among the standouts on parent album Unexpected. He felt that it was "drenched in neo-soul grooves." Tyler Lewis from PopMatters found that "I Ain't Hearin' U" was "truly thrilling and has the kind of groove that animated the great '80s songs by Stephanie Mills and Shirley Murdock." Similarly, Popdose noted that "I Ain't Hearin' U" was "reminiscent of old-school Stephanie Mills classics like "What Cha Gonna Do With My Lovin'," while Andy Gill, writing for The Independent, remarked that the "itchy guitar groove of "I Ain't Hearin' U" recalls the slick 1980s funk-soul of such as Patrice Rushen."

== Music video ==
A music video for "I Ain't Hearin' U" was directed by Billie Woodruff and shot in Atlanta, Georgia. Filming took place at Door 44, a Midtown nightclub on 12th Street, in the heart of the Crescent nightlife district. The visuals feature a cameo by actress Terry Vaughn.

== Track listings ==
Digital single
No.	Title	Writer(s)	Producer(s)	Length
1.	"I Ain't Hearin' U"	Steven "Supe" White; Juanita Wynn; Willie Lester; Rodney Brown	White	3:26

Sample credits

- "I Ain't Hearin' U" contains a sample of "What Are You Waiting for?" by Evelyn "Champagne" King, written by Willie Lester and Rodney Brown.

== Credits and personnel ==
Credits lifted from the liner notes of Unexpected.

- Rodney Brown – writing (sample)
- Tyrrell Harrell – engineering assistance
- Willie Lester – writing (sample)
- Merion "Joei" Powers – recording
- Alvin Speights – mastering, mixing
- Steven "Supe" White – production, writing
- Juanita Wynn – backing vocals, writing

== Charts ==
Weekly chart performance for "I Ain't Hearin' U"
Chart (2009)	Peak position
Japan (Japan Hot 100)	68
South Korea International (Gaon)	67
US Adult R&B Songs (Billboard)	14
US Hot R&B/Hip-Hop Songs (Billboard)	42
