= The Art of Love & War =

Studio album by Angie Stone
- Released: October 15, 2007
- Studios: Marvin's Room, Hollywood, California (Note: Tracks 1–7, 9, 10 and 13; additional recording on tracks 8 and 14); Doug's Dungeon (Note: Tracks 8 and 14); ATM, North Hollywood, California (Note: Tracks 11 and 12)
- Length: 56:47
- Label: Stax
- Producers: Angie Stone (also exec.); Colin Stanback (exec.); 5 Star; Co-T; The Designated Hitters; Dris; Victor Flores; Elijah "Vato" Harris; Chris Hutch; MJ McClain; Jon Nettlesbey; Ervin "EP" Pope; Jonathan Richmond

Angie Stone chronology
Stone Hits: The Very Best of Angie Stone (2005)	The Art of Love & War (2007)	Unexpected (2009)

Singles from The Art of Love & War
- 1. "Baby" Released: August 28, 2007; 2. "Sometimes" Released: January 28, 2008; 3. "Pop Pop" Released: August 25, 2008

The Art of Love & War is the fourth studio album by American singer Angie Stone. It was released on October 15, 2007, by Stax Records. Her debut release with the then re-launched label, following her split with J Records in 2005, it saw Stone working with a group of less well-known musicians, including The Designated Hitters, Elijah "Vato" Harris, Ervin Pope and Jonathan Richmond, the latter of which went on to produce most material on the album. English actor and DJ Idris Elba contributed "My People," a duet with singer James Ingram. Stone co-wrote and produced or co-produced most songs on the album.

Upon release, The Art of Love & War earned generally mixed reviews from critics, some of whom complimented the well-crafted production and Stone's delivery, while others criticized the album for its number of downtempo songs, finding it too conservative. While less successful internationally, the album debuted and peaked at number 11 on the US Billboard 200 and number one on the Top R&B/Hip-Hop Albums, becoming Stone's highest-charting album in the US. Lead single "Baby" featuring Betty Wright reached the top of the Adult R&B Songs chart and was nominated for Best R&B Performance by a Duo or Group with Vocals at the 50th Annual Grammy Awards.

== Background ==
In June 2004, Stone released Stone Love, her second studio album with J Records. While it debuted at number 14 on the US Billboard 200 and entered the top twenty in Belgium, Finland, Sweden and the Netherlands, the album was commercially less successful than its predecessors Black Diamond (1999) and Mahogany Soul (2001) both of whom had become gold-sellers in the United Kingdom and the United States. The following year, Stone began recording what as expected to become her fifth regular album, but to save costs J Records asked her to transfer her new material, including the previously unreleased single "I Wasn't Kidding", to a compilation album halfway through the recording process. Speaking volumes to her what her future with the company would be, Stone subsequently asked for and received an unconditional release from the label. Her third full-length release, the compilation Stone Hits: The Very Best of Angie Stone, released in June 2005, marked her final release with the company. The following year, Stone was approached by the reworked Stax Records and signed with the label.

== Critical reception ==
Professional ratings
Aggregate scores
Source	Rating
Metacritic	60/100
Review scores
Source	Rating
About.com	3.5/5 stars
AllMusic	3.5/5 stars
The Guardian	3/5 stars
Now	4/5 Ns
PopMatters	6/10
Prefix	8/10

The Art of Love & War received mixed reviews from music critics. At Metacritic, which assigns a normalized rating out of 100 to reviews from mainstream publications, the album received an average score of 60, based on 11 reviews. AllMusic rated the album three and a half stars out of five and complimented the track listing for its "nods to classic styles, blending funk, soul, balladry, and R&B in one tasty package", adding: "Yet The Art of Love & War is contemporary through and through. Shimmering with a modern, digital production sheen, the album is clearly steeped in urban contemporary R&B, more lush and languid than stripped down and raw. Stone is no mere puppet of the past: her voice, delivery, and feel are all her own, whether on butter-smooth love songs or hard-swinging groovers." Billboard wrote that the album "emphasizes gratitude above anything else [...] Stone remains impressive as a vocalist, an old-school soul with an understated delivery that's more hushed than histrionic."

Prefix called the album "one of the best neo-soul albums to come out in years" and wrote: "About ten of the album's tracks are produced in a similar style, channeling the musical complexity of the '70s over a simple funky track. The formula works well, so when the album moves away from this style [...] it's a bit of a jolt [...] The strength of the album rests not on one aspect. From the dense lyrics spanning a wealth of topics to the perfect production, The Art of Love & War proves that Stone isn't going anywhere. Jon Pareles, writer for The New York Times noted that "love decisively outnumbers war as the subject of songs on The Art of Love and War, as Angie Stone luxuriates in the ways her voice can warm and soothe a melody." He felt that the album "is filled with lush, suavely undulating ballads that have Ms. Stone cooing quietly and intimately."

Maddy Costa of The Guardian found that The Art of Love and War "radiates beatific, confident optimism [...] You can't blame [Stone] for indulging in a little self-adulation, not least when she does so with such musical grace [...] but that mood of indulgence also leads to a surfeit of mellifluous vocals, syrupy beats and billowing, sugary melodies that makes the album cloy." Mike Joseph from PopMatters noted that "even though you wish Stone would broaden her sonic palette just a little bit, there's something to be said for knowing your lane and staying in it." He felt that with The Art of Love and War, "Stone provides the perfect midpoint between vets like Gladys Knight and Chaka Khan and the younger divas like Mary J. Blige and Keyshia Cole. It's old-school soul with just a pinch of contemporary flavor [...] Although she could occasionally use a co-lyricist, The Art of Love & War marks yet another solid entry into the musical canon of an under appreciated vocalist."

== Commercial performance ==
The Art of Love & War debuted at number 11 on the US Billboard 200 with 45,000 copies sold in its first week, becoming Stone's highest-charting album to date. It also debuted at number one on the Top R&B/Hip-Hop Albums chart, Stone's first album to do so.

== Track listing ==
The Art of Love & War track listing
No.	Title	Writer(s)	Producer(s)	Length
1.	"Take Everything In"	Angie Stone; Juanita Wynn; Shamora Crawford; Jonathan Richmond	Richmond; Stone^{[a]}	3:52
2.	"Baby" (featuring Betty Wright)	Stone; Corey Tatum; Kevin Norton; Curtis Mayfield	Co-T; 5 Star; Stone^{[a]}	4:50
3.	"Here We Go Again"	Stone; Richmond	Richmond; Stone^{[a]}	3:33
4.	"Make It Last"	Stone; Wynn; Richmond	Richmond; Stone^{[a]}	3:46
5.	"Sometimes"	Stone; Wynn; Crawford; Richmond	Richmond; Stone^{[a]}	3:21
6.	"Go Back to Your Life"	Stone	Stone	1:22
7.	"Half a Chance" (featuring Chino)	Stone; Thomas Seabrooks; Richmond	Stone	4:06
8.	"These Are the Reasons"	Crawford; Derek Allen; Saleem Asad	The Designated Hitters; Stone^{[a]}	4:58
9.	"My People" (featuring James Ingram)	Stone; Ingram; Idris Elba; Birdell Fitch; Duke Ellington	Dris; MJ McClain; Stone^{[a]}; Jon Nettlesbey^{[b]}	5:59
10.	"Sit Down"	Stone; Elijah Harris	Elijah "Vato" Harris; Stone^{[a]}	4:32
11.	"Play wit It"	Stone; Patrice Rushen	Stone; Victor Flores^{[b]}; Chris Hutch^{[b]}	2:50
12.	"Pop Pop"	Stone; Wynn; Ervin Pope	Pope; Stone^{[a]}	3:51
13.	"Wait for Me"	Stone; Gordon Chambers; Richmond	Richmond; Stone^{[a]}	4:58
14.	"Happy Being Me" (featuring Pauletta Washington)	Stone; Allen	The Designated Hitters; Stone^{[a]}	4:28

Notes

- ^{^[a]} signifies a co-producer
- ^{^[b]} signifies an additional producer

Sample credits

- "Baby" contains elements of "Give Me Your Love (Love Song)" by Curtis Mayfield.
- "My People" contains elements from "My People" by Duke Ellington.
- "Play wit It" contains elements of "Hang It Up" by Patrice Rushen.

== Charts ==
=== Weekly charts ===
Weekly performance for The Art of Love & War
Chart (2007)	Peak position
French Albums (SNEP)	122
UK Albums (OCC)	106
UK R&B Albums (Official Charts)	10
US Billboard 200	11
US Top R&B/Hip-Hop Albums (Billboard)	1

=== Year-end charts ===
Year-end performance for The Art of Love & War
Chart (2008)	Position
US Top R&B/Hip-Hop Albums (Billboard)	75

== Release history ==
Release dates for The Art of Love & War
Region	Date	Label
United Kingdom	October 15, 2007	Concord
United States	October 16, 2007	Stax
Japan	October 17, 2007	Universal
Germany	October 26, 2007	Universal
Canada	October 30, 2007	Universal
Australia	November 17, 2007	Universal
