= Damon Little =

American gospel singer

- Born: Damon Little; Baltimore, Maryland, U.S.
- Genres: Gospel; Inspirational; R&B; worship
- Occupations: Singer, composer, musician, producer
- Years active: 1990–present
- Labels: Little World Music; Little Fats Music
- Website: damonlittleworld.com

Damon Little is an American singer, songwriter, producer, record label executive, and national spokesperson for the UOAA (United Ostomy Association of America). In 2021, his single, "Stand Up" charted at #1 on Billboard's Hot Gospel Songs chart, and subsequent single "No Stressin" (featuring Angie Stone) reached #1 on the Billboard Gospel Airplay chart in 2024. He has performed on BET and has shared the stage with Kirk Franklin, Yolanda Adams, Hezekiah Walker, Mary J. Blige, and Dionne Warwick, among others.

== Early life ==
Damon Little was born in Baltimore, Maryland and spent part of his childhood in Pensacola, Florida. His first studio recording was with his uncle, Clarence Fountain, a founding member of the band The Blind Boys of Alabama. Little suffered from Ostomy for most of his youth until a reversal at age thirteen and is now a national spokesperson for UOAA (United Ostomy Associations of America).

== Career ==
Little began writing music and performing as, "Damon Little and the Sons of Power," in 1990. They released one album titled, "I've Been Changed." In 2001, Little released an album as a featured artist with Nu Beginning titled, "You Can't Straddle the Fence," whose title track was included on the compilation album, "Spirit Rising Vol. 1", which included Destiny's Child and Deniece Williams, among others.

In 2002, Little wrote and produced the song, "I May Not Can See" on the Blind Boys of Alabama's, "Higher Ground," album. In 2003, NU BEGINNING (featuring Little) released the album, "Do Right," whose title track charted at #7 on Billboard's Hot Gospel Songs chart in 2005.

In 2008, he performed on Radio One's, "One Love Gospel Cruise", with Patti LaBelle, Kirk Franklin, and Hezekiah Walker, among others. He has also shared the stage with artists such as Mary J. Blige, Dionne Warwick, Blondie, and Lisa Page Brooks.

In 2023, he won a BMI "Trailblazer of Gospel Music Award" for "Stand Up" being of the one most performed songs on digital streaming services in 2023. In 2024, Little was ranked at #8 on Billboard's Top 10 Gospel Songwriters in 2024.

== Discography ==
| Year | Work | | | |
| Year | Work | Hot Gospel Songs | Gospel Airplay | Ref |
|---|---|---|---|---|
| 2005 | "Do Right" | 7 | | |
| 2015 | "Because of You" | 9 | | |
| 2017 | "I Won't Be Defeated" | 2 | | |
| 2019 | "Be Alright" | | 15 | |
| 2021 | "Stand Up" | 1 | | |
| 2024 | "No Stressing" (featuring Angie Stone) | | 1 | |

== Personal life ==
Little suffered from Ostomy for most of his youth until a reversal at age thirteen. He is now a national spokesperson for UOAA (United Ostomy Associations of America). In 2013, he underwent open heart bypass surgery.
