= Do What You Do =

Do What You Do may refer to:

- "Do What U Do", a song by Pink from Can't Take Me Home, 2000
- "Do What You Do" (Jermaine Jackson song), 1984
- "Do What You Do" (Mudvayne song), 2008
- "Do What You Do", a song by Tina Turner from Wildest Dreams, 1996
- "Do What You Do", a song by Air Supply from The Whole Thing's Started, 1977

== See also ==
- What You Do (disambiguation)
