= Do What U Gotta Do =

Single by Angie Stone

from the album Rich Girl
- Released: June 5, 2012
- Length: 3:24
- Label: Saguaro Road
- Songwriters: Isaac Lewis; Levi Stephens; Warren Jones; Y'anna Crawley
- Producers: Lewis; Stephens; Jones

Angie Stone singles chronology
| "Free" (2010) | "Do What U Gotta Do" (2012) | "Backup Plan" (2012) |

"Do What U Gotta Do" is a song by American recording artist Angie Stone. It was written by Isaac Lewis, Levi Stephens, Warren Jones, and Y'anna Crawley for Stone's sixth studio album Rich Girl (2012), while production was helmed by Lewis, Stephens, and Jones. Released as the album's lead single, it reached number 13 on Billboard's Adult R&B Songs.

== Track listings ==
Digital download
| No. | Title | Length |
|---|---|---|
| 1. | "Do What U Gotta Do" | 3:24 |

== Charts ==
| Chart (2012) | Peak position |
|---|---|
| US Adult R&B Songs (Billboard) | 13 |
| US Hot R&B/Hip-Hop Songs (Billboard) | 52 |
