= Love Language (Angie Stone album) =

Studio album by Angie Stone
- Released: May 19, 2023
- Length: 37:43
- Labels: Conjunction; SoNo

Angie Stone chronology
Full Circle (2019)	Love Language (2023)

Singles from Love Language
- 1. "Kiss You" Released: February 10, 2023

Love Language is the tenth and final studio album by American singer Angie Stone, released on May 19, 2023, by Conjunction Entertainment and SoNo recordιng, and the last to be released during Stone's lifetime. The songs "Kiss You" and "The Gym" featuring Musiq Soulchild were released prior to the album. The album includes an additional collaboration with Stone's son Swayvo Twain.

The album artwork photography was shot by Nora Bonds.

== Critical reception ==
Professional ratings
Review scores
Source	Rating
AllMusic	3.5/5 stars

AllMusic editor Andy Kellman rated the album three and half stars out of five. He found that Love Language was "in the same mode" as Stone's previous album Dream (2015) and Full Circle (2019), calling it "another serving of feel-good songs brightly colored with shades of classic Southern R&B and Philly soul." He noted that "the slight increase of grain in Stone's voice isn't at the expense of power."

== Track listing ==
Love Language track listing
No.	Title	Writer(s)	Producer(s)	Length
1.	"Love Is Real"	Balewa Muhammad; Candice Nelson; Elye Franklin; Raymond McCloud; Theo Sai; Walter Millsap III; Xavier Gordon	Millsap; Gordon; Muhammad; Nelson	3:25
2.	"The Gym" (featuring Musiq Soulchild)	Muhammad; Nelson; Franklin; Teak Underdue; Millsap	Millsap; Underdue; Muhammad; Nelson	3:19
3.	"Kiss You"	Muhammad; Nelson; Franklin; McCloud; Sai; Underdue; Millsap; Gordon; Kiara White	Millsap; Gordon; Muhammad; Nelson	3:45
4.	"Good Man"	Muhammad; Nelson; Underdue; Millsap; Gordon; White	Millsap; Underdue; Muhammad; Nelson	3:32
5.	"High"	Muhammad; Nelson; Lewis; Donte Lamar Perkins; Millsap; White	Millsap; Lewis; Tae Beast; Muhammad; Nelson	3:47
6.	"Love Language"	Muhammad; Nelson; Aaron P. Burns-Lyles; George "G-Smoove" McDonald; Kevin J. Bridges; Marco Richh; Nathaniel C. Stallworth; Tanisha Blacks; Millsap	Millsap; Burns-Lyles; Stallworth; Scantlebury; Bridges; Muhammad; Nelson	2:57
7.	"All I Need"	Muhammad; Nelson; Richh; Nathaniel C. Stallworth; Blacks; Tierre Maurice Harris; Millsap	Millsap; Harris; Muhammad; Nelson	3:30
8.	"Love the Feeling"	Muhammad; Nelson; McDonald; Richh; Blacks; Millsap; Gordon	Millsap; Gordon; Muhammad; Nelson	3:54
9.	"Old Thang Back" (featuring Swayvo Train)	Angie Stone; Muhammad; Nelson; McDonald; Richh; Blacks; Millsap; Gordon	Millsap; Gordon; Muhammad; Nelson	3:27
10.	"Kiss You" (X mix)	Muhammad; Nelson; Franklin; McCloud; Sai; Underdue; Millsap; Gordon; White	Millsap; Gordon^{[a]}; Muhammad; Nelson	3:48
11.	"Kiss You" (Jersey club mix)	Muhammad; Nelson; Franklin; McCloud; Sai; Underdue; Millsap; Gordon; White	Millsap; Gordon^{[a]}; Muhammad; Nelson	2:20
Total length:				37:43

Notes

- ^{^[a]} signifies a producer and remix producer

Sample credits

- "Kiss You" contains an interpolation of "I Miss You" by Harold Melvin & the Blue Notes.
