= Stone Hits: The Very Best of Angie Stone =

2005 greatest hits album by Angie Stone

Greatest hits album by Angie Stone
- Released: June 21, 2005
- Label: J
- Producer: Angie Stone; Craig Brockman; Eddie F; Russell Elevado; Missy Elliott; Gerald Isaac; Jake and the Phatman; Jazze Pha; Darren Lighty; Ivan Matias; Andrea Martin; Vada Nobles; Jonathan Richmond; Raphael Saadiq; Ali Shaheed Muhammad; John Smith; Nisan Stewart; Swizz Beatz; Eran Tabib

Angie Stone chronology
Stone Love (2004)	Stone Hits: The Very Best of Angie Stone (2005)	The Art of Love & War (2007)

Singles from Stone Hits: The Very Best of Angie Stone
- 1. "I Wasn't Kidding" Released: October 10, 2005

Stone Hits: The Very Best of Angie Stone is a greatest hits album by American singer Angie Stone, released on June 21, 2005, by J Records. Stone's highest-charting UK single, "Life Story", appears as a bonus track.

== Background ==
In June 2004, Stone released Stone Love, her second studio album with J Records. While it debuted at number 14 on the US Billboard 200 and entered the top twenty in Belgium, Finland, Sweden and the Netherlands, the album was commercially less successful than its predecessors Black Diamond (1999) and Mahogany Soul (2001) both of whom had become gold-sellers in the United Kingdom and the United States. The following year, Stone began recording what as expected to become her fifth regular album, but to save costs J Records asked her to transfer her new material, including the previously unreleased single "I Wasn't Kidding," to a compilation album halfway through the recording process. Speaking volumes to her what her future with the company would be, Stone subsequently asked Clive Davis for and received an unconditional release from the label, with Stone Hits: The Very Best of Angie Stone becoming her final release with the record company.

== Promotion ==
J Records decided to include two previously unreleased songs on Stone Hits: The Very Best of Angie Stone, including "Little Boy" and "I Wasn't Kidding," the latter of which was released as the album's first and only single on October 10, 2005. Co-written and produced by Andrea Martin, who had produced on Stone's 2002 hit single "Wish I Didn't Miss You," it peaked at number 17 on the US Dance Club Songs chart. Music Week ranked it 26th on its UK Urban 2005 year-end chart.

== Critical reception ==
Professional ratings
Review scores
Source	Rating
AllMusic	4/5 stars
The New Zealand Herald	4/5 stars

AllMusic editor Rob Theakston found that "it seems premature in a five-year career to have a best-of compilation out, but these 15 selections add up to a most satisfying listening experience. With her vocal delivery, Stone belts tunes out better than most, and covers some of soul music's more obscure classics, making them her own with reverence and ease. And it seems that with each new release she becomes more focused and distinct from her contemporaries, and as a result turns out one of the better greatest-hits compilations from this era." Rebecca Barry from The New Zealand Herald wrote: "With just three albums to her name, neo-soul's most underrated artist can hardly claim this as a greatest hits. But with classic cuts [...], plus a dance mix, a collaboration with Alicia Keys and Eve and a live version of "What U Dyin' For," this is just as effective an introduction." Jet magazine found that "Stone's fearless delivery of heart-on-sleeve messages of love and heartbreak are just the right recipe."

== Commercial performance ==
Stone Hits: The Very Best of Angie Stone debuted and peaked at number 50 on the US Top R&B/Hip-Hop Albums chart in the week of November 12, 2005.

== Track listing ==
Stone Hits – US edition
No.	Title	Writer(s)	Producer	Length
1.	"Wish I Didn't Miss You"	Andrea Martin; Ivan Matias; Leon Huff; Gene McFadden; John Whitehead	Matias; Martin; Stone^{[a]}; Swizz Beatz^{[a]}	4:30
2.	"Brotha"	Stone; Raphael Saadiq; Harold Lilly; Glenn Standridge; Robert C. Ozuna	Saadiq; Jake and the Phatman^{[a]}	4:28
3.	"Stay for a While" (featuring Anthony Hamilton)	Stone; Jonathan Richmond; Juanita Wynn; Hamilton	Stone; Richmond	3:58
4.	"I Wasn't Kidding"	Martin; Adrian Austin; Cecil Womack; Linda Womack	Martin; Vada Nobles	4:28
5.	"I Wanna Thank Ya" (featuring Snoop Dogg)	Stone; Phalon Alexander; Calvin Broadus; Joyce Sims; Eldra DeBarge	Jazze Pha	3:47
6.	"Pissed Off"	Stone; Eran Tabib; Rufus Moore; Stephanie Bolton	Stone; Tabib; Chucky T^{[b]}	4:41
7.	"U-Haul"	Missy Elliott; Nisan Stewart; Craig Brockman; John Smith	Elliott; Stewart^{[a]}; Brockman^{[a]}; John "Jubu" Smith^{[a]}	3:56
8.	"Little Boy"	Omar Christopher Hammer	Carl Thompson	5:01
9.	"Lovers' Ghetto"	Rufus Moore; Richard Randolph; Ricky Smith; Kevin Spencer; Rod Temperton	Rufus Blaq; Prince Charles Alexander; Jamel "Melekeyz" Oliver^{[d]}	4:05
10.	"Brotha Part II" (featuring Alicia Keys and Eve)	Stone; Saadiq; Lilly; Standridge; Ozuna; Jerry Beach	Saadiq; Jake and the Phatman^{[c]}; Kerry "Krucial" Brothers^{[c]}	4:02
11.	"Bottles & Cans"	Gerald Isaac	Isaac	3:54
12.	"Time of the Month"	Isaac	Isaac	4:09
13.	"What U Dyin' For" (live)	Stone; Ali Shaheed Muhammad	Muhammad	5:26

Bonus tracks
No.	Title	Writer(s)	Producer	Length
14.	"Wish I Didn't Miss You" (Pound Boys Stoneface Bootleg Remix)	Martin; Matias; Huff; McFadden; Whitehead	Matias; Martin; Stone^{[a]}; Swizz Beatz^{[a]}; Pound Boys^{[c]}	7:52
15.	"Gotta Get to Know You Better"	Stone; Jamal Peoples; Larry Peoples Sr.; Larry Peoples Jr	Butterfingers	3:52

Stone Hits – International edition
No.	Title	Writer(s)	Producer	Length
1.	"Wish I Didn't Miss You"	Andrea Martin; Ivan Matias; Leon Huff; Gene McFadden; John Whitehead	Matias; Martin; Stone^{[a]}; Swizz Beatz^{[a]}	4:30
2.	"Brotha"	Stone; Raphael Saadiq; Harold Lilly; Glenn Standridge; Robert C. Ozuna	Saadiq; Jake and the Phatman^{[a]}	4:28
3.	"No More Rain (In This Cloud)"	Stone; Bert Williams; Gordon Chambers; Jim Weatherly	Stone	4:42
4.	"Stay for a While" (featuring Anthony Hamilton)	Stone; Jonathan Richmond; Juanita Wynn; Hamilton	Stone; Richmond	3:58
5.	"I Wasn't Kidding"	Martin; Adrian Austin; Cecil Womack; Linda Womack	Martin; Vada Nobles	4:28
6.	"I Wanna Thank Ya" (featuring Snoop Dogg)	Stone; Phalon Alexander; Calvin Broadus; Joyce Sims; Eldra DeBarge	Jazze Pha	3:47
7.	"Everyday"	Stone; D'Angelo	Russell Elevado	3:28
8.	"Pissed Off"	Stone; Eran Tabib; Rufus Moore; Stephanie Bolton	Stone; Tabib; Chucky T^{[b]}	4:41
9.	"More Than a Woman" (featuring Joe)	Calvin Richardson; Balewa Muhammad; Eddie Ferrell; Darren Lighty; Clifton Lighty	Eddie F; D. Lighty	4:53
10.	"U-Haul"	Missy Elliott; Nisan Stewart; Craig Brockman; John Smith	Elliott; Stewart^{[a]}; Brockman^{[a]}; John "Jubu" Smith^{[a]}	3:56
11.	"Bottles & Cans"	Gerald Isaac	Isaac	3:54
12.	"Little Boy"	Omar Christopher Hammer	Carl Thompson	5:01
13.	"Makings of You (Interlude)"	Curtis Mayfield	Stone	2:30
14.	"Bone 2 Pic (Wit U)"	Ali Shaheed Muhammad; Stone; Chalmers Alford	Muhammad	5:19
15.	"Brotha Part II" (featuring Alicia Keys and Eve)	Stone; Saadiq; Lilly; Standridge; Ozuna; Jerry Beach	Saadiq; Jake and the Phatman^{[c]}; Kerry "Krucial" Brothers^{[c]}	4:02

Bonus tracks
No.	Title	Writer(s)	Producer	Length
16.	"Wish I Didn't Miss You" (Pound Boys Stoneface Bootleg Remix)	Martin; Matias; Huff; McFadden; Whitehead	Matias; Martin; Stone^{[a]}; Swizz Beatz^{[a]}; Pound Boys^{[c]}	7:52
17.	"Life Story" (Booker T Mix)	Gerry DeVeaux; Craig Ross	DeVeaux; Cutfather & Joe^{[a]}; Booker T^{[c]}	4:07

Notes

- ^{^a} signifies a co-producer
- ^{^b} signifies a programming producer
- ^{^c} signifies an additional producer and remixer
- ^{^d} signifies an associate producer

Sampling credits

- "Wish I Didn't Miss You" contains elements from "Back Stabbers" by The O'Jays.
- "I Wasn't Kidding" contains a sample of Womack & Womack's "Baby I'm Scared of You".
- "I Wanna Thank Ya" contains re-sung lyrics from "Come into My Life" by Joyce Sims and interpolations of "All This Love" by DeBarge.
- "Lovers' Ghetto" contains elements from "Adventures in the Land of Music" by Dynasty and elements of "Lady in My Life" by Rod Temperton.
- "Brotha Part II" contains excerpts from "I'll Play the Blues for You" by Albert King.
- "Time of the Month" contains replayed elements from "I Can't Say No" as written by C. Jackson and M.J. Yancey.
- "No More Rain (In This Cloud)" contains samples of "Neither One of Us (Wants to Be the First to Say Goodbye)" by Gladys Knight & the Pips.

== Charts ==
Weekly performance for Stone Hits: The Very Best of Angie Stone
Chart (2005)	Peak position
US Top R&B/Hip-Hop Albums (Billboard)	50

== Release history ==
Release dates and formats for Stone Love
Region	Date	Label
United States	June 21, 2005	J
Canada	June 21, 2005	Sony
Australia	October 1, 2005	Sony BMG
United Kingdom	November 7, 2005	BMG
Germany	November 18, 2005	Sony BMG
Japan	December 7, 2005	BMG
