= Rich Girl (album) =

Studio album by Angie Stone
- Released: September 25, 2012
- Length: 50:31
- Label: Saguaro Road Rhythm
- Producers: Angie Stone (also exec.); Sammy Blues; Korey Bowie; Bobby Brass; Mike City; J & J2 Productions; Warren Jones; Isaac Lewis; Demond Mickens; Levi Stephens; Corey "Co-T" Tatum

Angie Stone chronology
Unexpected (2009)	Rich Girl (2012)	Dream (2015)

Rich Girl is the sixth studio album by American singer Angie Stone. It was released on September 25, 2012, by Saguaro Road Rhythm, selling 4,000 units in the US in its first week of release. The lead single, '"Do What U Gotta Do" was released on June 5, 2012, and the music video premiered on July 21, 2012.

== Critical reception ==
Professional ratings
Review scores
Source	Rating
AllMusic	3/5 stars
Daytona Beach News-Journal	3.5/4 stars

Washington Post critic Bill Friskics-Warren found that on Rich Girl Stone "sounds as assured as ever with a groove-steeped mix of ballads and mid-tempo testimonials to self-possession and resilience [...] Without a misstep among the pressing beats and handclaps that animate these 15 tracks, the redoubtable Stone proves herself to be in complete command of the smart, sexy neo-soul she's been perfecting ever since the release of her signature 1999 single, "No More Rain (In This Cloud)"." Biana Roach from Associated Press called the album a "triumphant return" and described it as a "a collection of positive, in-your-face, fresh funky tunes" as well as an "easy listening."

L. Michael Gipson, writing for SoulTracks, called Rich Girl "classic Angie Stone old school cry." Less impressed with the uptempo material which he felt was "enjoyable, but just shy of must-listen artistry," Gipson noted that "ballads here fare better." Allmusic editor Andy Kellman remarked that "this album doesn't offer as many high points as her two previous Stax albums, and it's as scattered quality-wise as it is stylistically diverse. Stone's beaming, easygoing nature and typically excellent vocals save the majority of the substandard material [...] If Stone really wanted to get back to basics, she could have made a whole album with the terminally undervalued Mike City. His smacking but smoothened grooves are a great fit [...]"

== Chart performance ==
Rich Girl debuted and peaked at number 109 on the US Billboard 200 in the week of October 13, 2012, selling 4,000 units in its first week of release. The second-highest debut on the Top R&B/Hip-Hop Albums, it also debuted and peaked at number 15 on the chart. As of June 16, 2013, Rich Girl has sold 19,762 units in the US.

== Track listing ==
Rich Girl track listing
No.	Title	Writer(s)	Producer(s)	Length
1.	"Intro: Real Music"	Stone	Stone	0:48
2.	"Do What U Gotta Do"	Isaac Lewis; Levi Stephens; Warren Jones; Y'anna Crawley	Lewis; Stephens; Jones	3:24
3.	"Backup Plan"	Stone; Michael Flowers	Mike City	3:26
4.	"Proud of Me"	Stone; James Owens Jr.; James Owens Sr.; Joi Campbell	J & J2 Productions	3:54
5.	"First Time"	Ametria Dock; Demond Mickens; Kameron Jones; Kevin D. Owens; Montsho Eshe; Temeka Gaither	Korey Bowie; Mickens	3:30
6.	"Guilty"	Aaron Lyles; Robert Gerongco; Samuel T. Gerongco	Lyles; Bobby Brass; Sammy Blues	5:01
7.	"Interlude" (featuring Malcolm-Jamal Warner)	Jamal-Warner	Stone	1:07
8.	"Alright"	Stone; Owens Jr.; Owens Sr.	J & J2 Productions	3:52
9.	"Livin' It Up"	Bowie; Mickens	Bowie; Mickens	3:39
10.	"Rich Girl"	Lewis; Stephens; Jones; Crawley; Jared X.G. Anderson	Lewis; Stephens; Jones	3:38
11.	"Right in Front of Me"	Stone; Flowers	City	3:03
12.	"I Can't Take it"	Stone; Corey "Co-T" Tatum	Stone; Tatum	3:21
13.	"Push N' Pull"	Stone; Owens Jr.; Owens Sr.; Gary Noel	J & J2 Productions	3:25
14.	"U Lit My Fire"	Stone; Carnell Damahn Bowden; Tatum	Tatum	4:11
15.	"Sisters" (featuring Y'Anna Crawley, Tweet, Danetra Moore and Diamond Stone)	Stone; Charlene Keys; Moore; Lewis; Jones; Crawley	Stephens	4:14
Total length:				50:33

== Charts ==
Weekly performance for Rich Girl
Chart (2012)	Peak position
US Billboard 200	109
US Top R&B/Hip-Hop Albums (Billboard)	15

== Release history ==
Release dates and formats for Rich Girl
Region	Date	Format(s)	Label	Ref.
Various	September 25, 2012	CD; digital download; streaming	Saguaro Road Rhythm	
