= Angie Stone =

American singer and actress (1961–2025)

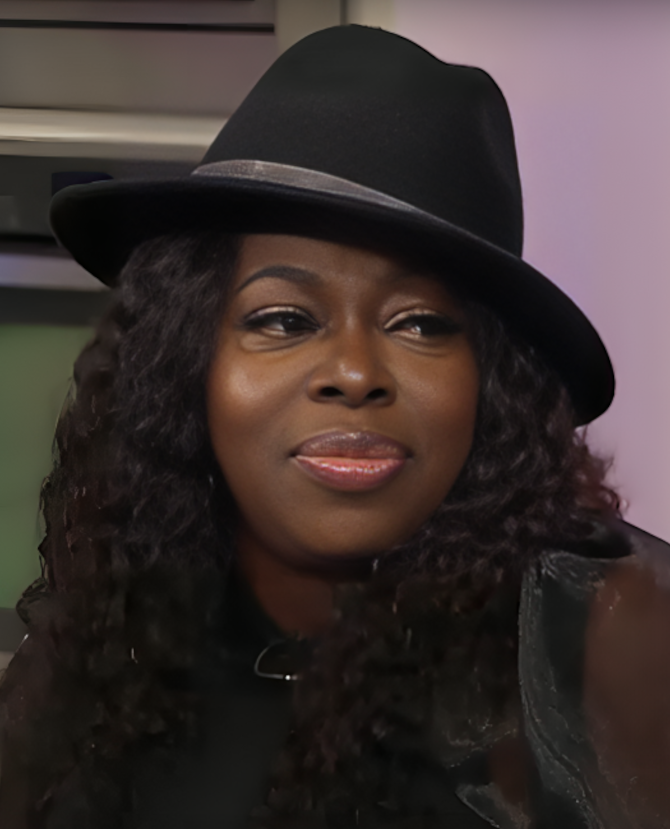
- Stone in 2019
- Born: Angela Laverne Brown; December 18, 1961; Columbia, South Carolina, U.S.
- Died: March 1, 2025 (aged 63); Montgomery County, Alabama, U.S.
- Other name: Angie B.
- Occupations: Singer-songwriter; rapper; actress; record producer
- Years active: 1979–2025
- Spouse(s): Lil' Rodney C! (m. 1983; div. late 1980s)
- Partner: D'Angelo (1994–1999)
- Children: 2
- Musical career
- Genres: R&B; soul; neo soul; hip-hop
- Instruments: Vocals; keyboards; saxophone
- Works: Angie Stone discography
- Labels: Arista; J; Stax; Shanachie
- Formerly of: The Sequence; Vertical Hold
- Website: theangiestone.com

Angela Laverne Stone (née Brown; December 18, 1961 – March 1, 2025) was an American singer-songwriter, rapper, actress, and record producer. With a career spanning more than four decades, she has been credited with revolutionizing the sound of hip-hop and neo soul.

Originally known as Angie B., she rose to fame in 1979 as a member of The Sequence, the first female music act in hip hop music. In the early 1990s, she became a member of the R&B group Vertical Hold. In late 1990s, she pursued a solo career as Angie Stone and signed with Arista Records to release her debut solo album Black Diamond (1999), which received a gold certification by the Recording Industry Association of America (RIAA) and spawned the single "No More Rain (In This Cloud)". After transitioning to J Records, she released her second album, Mahogany Soul (2001), which spawned the hit single "Wish I Didn't Miss You". It was followed by Stone Love (2004) and The Art of Love & War (2007), the latter which became her first and only number-one album on the US Billboard Top R&B/Hip-Hop Albums chart.

Stone ventured into acting in the 2000s, making her film debut in the 2002 comedy film The Hot Chick, and her stage debut in 2003, in the role of Big Mama Morton in the Broadway musical Chicago. She then went on to appear in supporting roles in films and television series as well as several musical productions, including VH1's Celebrity Fit Club and TV One's R&B Divas, and movies such as The Fighting Temptations (2003), Pastor Brown (2009), and School Gyrls (2010).

Her accolades included two Soul Train Lady of Soul Awards and an Edison Award, alongside nominations for three Grammy Awards and three Soul Train Music Awards. In 2021, she was honored with the Soul Music Icon Award at the Black Music Honors, followed by her induction into the Women Songwriters Hall of Fame in 2024. Over the course of her career, she earned two gold-certified studio albums with total solo sales exceeding five million records worldwide.

== Early life ==
Angela Laverne Brown was born in Columbia, South Carolina, to Iona Williams (née Brown), a hospital technician, and Bobby Williams, a lawyer's assistant and gospel singer. She attended W.A. Perry Middle School and later C.A. Johnson High School. Brown was also a member of the choir at First Nazareth Baptist Church in Columbia where she sang her first solo.

== Career ==
=== 1979–1985: Career beginnings and The Sequence ===
In 1979, Brown formed a female hip-hop group known as The Sequence. Brown, along with her childhood friends and group mates Gwendolyn Chisolm and Cheryl Cook, attended a concert by hip-hop group The Sugarhill Gang. The group made their way backstage and met Sylvia Robinson who was the CEO of hip hop label Sugar Hill Records. They auditioned for Robinson who signed them to the label as their first female act. While in the group, Brown adopted the stage name Angie B. They released their debut single "Funk You Up" in December 1979. The song became one of the first original hip hop songs to be released without sampling. "Funk You Up" peaked at number fifteen on the Hot Soul Singles. In 1980, The Sequence released their debut album Sugarhill presents The Sequence, which received positive reviews from music critics.

In 1981, the group began doing session work for other music acts on Sugar Hill Records. They wrote and provided background vocals for "Sing a Simple Song" and "Let's Dance (Make Your Body Move)" by West Street Mob, the latter of which peaked at number eighty-eight on Billboard's Hot 100 chart and number eighteen on the Hot Soul Singles. In 1982, The Sequence released their self-titled second album, which peaked at number fifty-one on the Black LPs chart. The album's first single "I Don't Need Your Love (Part One)" peaked at number forty on Billboard's Hot Soul Singles chart. In 1983, they released their third album The Sequence Party. The Sequence followed up with the release of their single "I Just Want to Know". In 1985, they released their final singles: "Funk It Up '85" and "Control".

In 1985, the group refused to renew their recording contract after a dispute with Sugar Hill Records CEO Sylvia Robinson. The group's dispute with the label stemmed from not being paid their royalties from the songs they wrote and recorded. The group also felt like the money from their royalties were being used to support other musical acts on Sugar Hill Records. Stone briefly pursued a solo music career and also began working at Kiss-FM radio station in New York. Angie B. began performing as Angie B. Stone and later simply Angie Stone, carrying the last name of her first husband Rodney "Lil' Rodney C" Stone.

=== 1986–1996: Vertical Hold and DeVox ===
Following her departure from Sugar Hill Records, Stone made attempts to start a solo career. She began writing solo material and booked studio time at her own expense. Through the studio's engineer Gordon Mack III, Stone was introduced to musicians David Bright and Willie Bruno Jr., who were impressed by her songwriting abilities and asked her to write on their songs. While she initially saw the collaboration as just an opportunity to work in the studio for free and have access to a team of musicians, it eventually led to the formation of the R&B/hip hop quartet It's Us. Renamed Vertical Hold, they released their first single "Summertime" in 1988 on Criminal Records. The group secured a recording deal with A&M Records. She also secured a songwriting and publishing deal with MCA Records. She also mentored the label's newly-signed talents including Mary J. Blige. In 1990, Stone performed as the saxophonist for Lenny Kravitz's Let Love Rule Tour.

In June 1993, the group released their debut album A Matter of Time. The album peaked at number thirty-three on the US Top R&B Albums chart, selling more than 62,000 copies in the first week of its release. The album's lead single "Seems You're Much Too Busy" peaked at number seventeen on the US Hot R&B Singles chart. Their follow-up single "A.S.A.P." peaked at number eighty-three on the US Hot R&B Singles chart. Through their parent label Universal Music Group, Stone was offered a songwriting deal with Midnight Songs LLC. She was eventually brought in to help newly signed singer D'Angelo complete his first album Brown Sugar.

In early 1995, Stone vocally arranged the single "Freedom (Theme from Panther)", which became the theme song for drama film Panther. In May 1995, Vertical Hold released their second and final album Head First. Due to a lack of promotional support from their record label, Vertical Hold parted way at the end of 1995. Also in the same year, Stone toured as a background vocalist for D'Angelo's Brown Sugar Tour. One of their concerts was recorded at Jazz Café in London, England, on September 14, 1995, and released as D'Angelo's live album Live at the Jazz Cafe (1998). In 1996, Stone became a featured vocalist for Gerry DeVeaux and Charlie Mole who had formed a group called DeVox. The group released an album titled Devox featuring Angie B. Stone, exclusively in Japan. The project caught the attention of Arista Records A&R manager Peter Edge, which lead to Stone being offered a solo recording contract with Arista Records.

=== 1997–2004: Black Diamond, Mahogany Soul, and career breakthrough ===
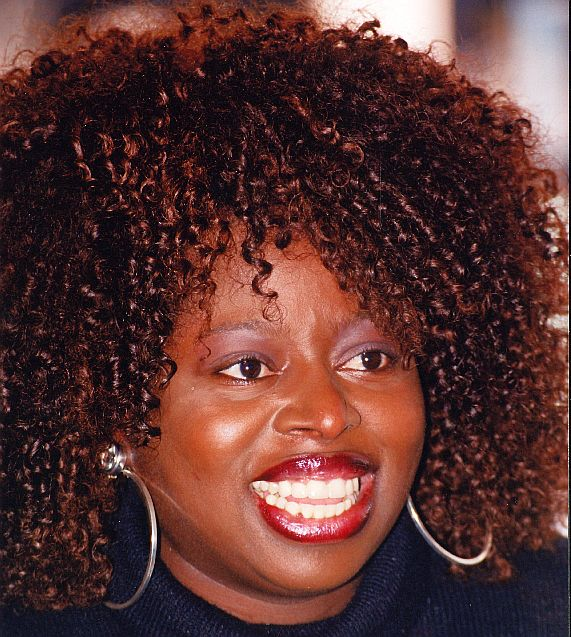
Stone in 1997

In September 1999, Stone released her debut solo album Black Diamond on Arista Records. Black Diamond peaked at number forty-six on the Billboard 200 chart and number nine on the US Top R&B Albums chart. The album's lead single, "No More Rain (In This Cloud)", peaked at number fifty-six on Billboard Hot 100 and also became Stone's first number-one song on the US Adult R&B Songs chart, spending ten weeks atop of the chart. The singles "Life Story and "Everyday" peaked in the top twenty on the UK Hip Hop and R&B Singles chart. Black Diamond was eventually certified gold by both the Recording Industry Association of America (RIAA) and the British Phonographic Industry (BPI). Stone also won Best Solo R&B/Soul New Artist and Best Solo R&B/Soul Single for "No More Rain (In This Cloud)" at the 2000 Soul Train Music Awards. She also co-wrote four songs on D'Angelo's album Voodoo (2000).

In 2000, Stone transitioned from Arista to music executive Clive Davis's venture J Records. She recorded the theme song for American sitcom television series Girlfriends. Stone's second solo album, Mahogany Soul, was released on October 16, 2001. The album debuted and peaked at number twenty-two on the US Billboard 200, selling 71,000 copies in its first week of release. The album's lead single, "Brotha", reached number fifty-two on the Billboard Hot 100 chart and number three on the US Adult R&B Songs chart. The second single, "Wish I Didn't Miss You", reach the top-ten on the charts in several territories worldwide, including the U.S. on the Dance Club Songs chart. The song also became certified gold by the British Phonographic Industry (BPI). The album also produced several additional singles, including "More Than a Woman" and "Bottles and Cans". At the 2003 Grammy Awards, "More Than a Woman" received a nomination for Best R&B Performance By A Duo or Group With Vocal. Mahogany Soul earned a gold certification by both the Recording Industry Association of America (RIAA) and the British Phonographic Industry (BPI). In November 2001, Stone embarked on the BK Got Music Summer Soul Tour alongside Luther Vandross, Gerald Levert, and Michelle Williams.

In December 2002, Stone made her theatrical film debut, portraying the character Madame Mambuza alongside Rob Schneider in the comedy The Hot Chick. The film debuted at number five at the U.S. box office and earned $7 million during its opening weekend. She later starred alongside Cuba Gooding Jr. in the musical comedy The Fighting Temptations (2003), portraying Alma; a singing laundromat employee. It received mixed reviews from critics and underperformed at the box office. Stone performed several songs for the film's soundtrack, including "Rain Down" and "Time to Come Home". Stone made her theatre debut as Matron Mama Morton in the Broadway production of Chicago.

Her third studio album, Stone Love, was released on June 28, 2004, in the U.S. and debuted at number fourteen on the Billboard 200, selling 53,000 copies in its first week. Stone Love included her number one US dance single "I Wanna Thank Ya" and top-twenty US Hot R&B/Hip-Hop Songs song "U-Haul", the latter which received a nomination for Best Female R&B Vocal Performance at the 2005 Grammy Awards. By 2005, Stone became dissatisfied with her record label J Records as the label began shifting focus to other newly signed talent. The record label released a compilation album Stone Hits: The Very Best of Angie Stone in June 2005, which anthologized her previous singles along with a new single "I Wasn't Kidding". Following the release of the compilation album, Stone left J Records.

=== 2006–2017: The Art of Love and War and subsequent releases ===
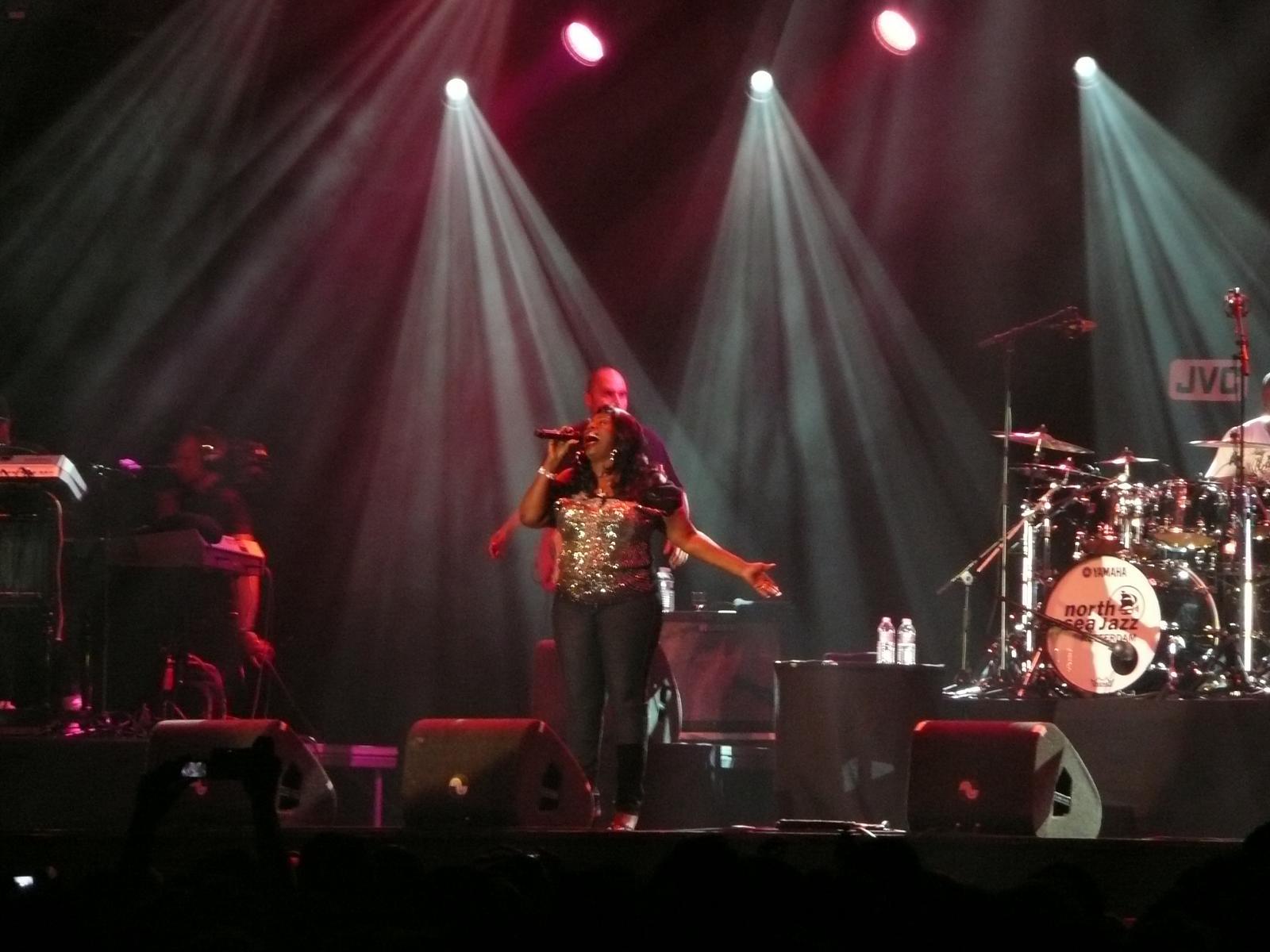
Stone performing live at the North Sea Jazz Festival in Rotterdam, Netherlands, on July 11, 2008

In 2006, Stone appeared on the VH1's reality television series Celebrity Fit Club for the fourth season, which began on August 6, 2006. While on the show, she lost eighteen pounds, the second lowest loss in the history of the show. Later that year, she signed a recording contract with the newly-revived label Stax Records. In January 2007, Stone embarked on the Sisters in the Spirit Tour alongside Shirley Caesar, Dorinda Clark-Cole, Nicole C. Mullen, and Kelly Price. On October 15, 2007, she released her fourth album The Art of Love & War. The album debuted at number eleven on the Billboard 200, selling 45,000 copies in its first week, becoming Stone's highest-charting album to date, as well as her first and only album to top the Top R&B/Hip-Hop Albums chart. The album's lead single, "Baby", a duet with Betty Wright, became her second number-one hit on the US Adult R&B Songs chart. The singles "Sometimes" and "Pop Pop" both peaked within the top thirty on the US Hot R&B/Hip-Hop Songs chart, respectively. The song "Baby" earned a nomination for Best R&B Performance By A Duo or Group With Vocal at 50th Annual Grammy Awards in 2008.

In April 2009, she released a cover of "Wade in the Water" for the soundtrack of the documentary film Soundtrack for a Revolution. Stone continued to expand her acting career by portraying strip-club owner Rick Fredericks in the drama film Pastor Brown (2009). In November 2009, she released her fifth album Unexpected. "I Ain't Hearin' U", the album's lead single, reached number fourteen on Billboard's Adult R&B Songs. In May 2011, Stone co-starred in the stage production Loving Him is Killing Me. In the summer of 2012, Stone also toured nationally in a Hinton Battle production of Love Lies. In September 2012, she released her sixth album Rich Girl on Saguaro Road Records. The following year, she joined the cast of TVOne's R&B Divas: Atlanta.

In 2014, Stone began working with music producer Walter Millsap III on her next album. In November 2015, she released her seventh album Dream on Shanachie Entertainment. Received well by music critics, the album debuted at number fifty-nine on the US Billboard 200 and number three on the US Top Hip-Hop/R&B Albums chart, her highest-charting album since The Art of Love & War (2007). The album's lead single "2 Bad Habits" peaked at number twenty on the Adult R&B Songs chart. The following year, she released her eighth album Covered in Soul on Goldenlane Records in August 2016. The album featured cover versions of popular R&B and soul music songs. In the same year, she co-starred alongside Rodney Perry in the drama film To Love the Soul of a Woman.

=== 2018–2025: Final years ===
Stone changed labels again for her 2019 album Full Circle, which saw her reteaming with her collaborators from the Dream album and was issued through Conjunction Entertainment in partnership Cleopatra Records. Released to generally positive reviews, it debuted and peaked at number 34 on the US Independent Albums chart and produced the Adult R&B songs top 30 hit "Dinosaur."

In 2021, she co-starred in the comedy film Entanglement. Love Language, her tenth and final solo album, was released in May 2023 through Conjunction and SoNo Recordιng. Once again largely penned by Milsap and his team, it failed to chart but was met with a warm response from music critics, who noted a slight increase of grain in Stone's voice. Also in 2023, she scored a supporting role in the Urbanflix television series Heaux Phase, in which she played the main character's mother, and appeared as a featured vocalist on singer Damon Little's song "No Stressing," which peaked at number one on US Gospel Airplay chart in early 2024, becoming her first song to do so.

In November 2024, Stone released her final single "All I'm Missing", which featured J. Brown and Juanita Wynn. In December 2024, Stone made an announcement via live stream that she was preparing to sue Universal Music Group for unpaid royalties.

== Death ==
Stone was killed in a car crash near Montgomery, Alabama, on March 1, 2025, at the age of 63. She and her band members were traveling in a Mercedes-Benz Sprinter van to Atlanta following a Mardi Gras concert in Mobile, Alabama, when it overturned on Interstate 65. The stationary vehicle was then hit by a Freightliner Cascadia semi-trailer truck while the passengers were trying to exit. Stone was the only fatality.

=== Remembrances and reactions ===
Numerous musicians and cultural figures reacted to Stone's death. Stone's funeral was held on March 14, 2025, at the Word of Faith Cathedral in Austell, Georgia. The memorial service was televised and live streamed. Kirk Franklin, Anthony Hamilton, Tamela Mann, Darlene McCoy, and Keke Wyatt performed at the memorial, and former Sequence groupmates Cheryl "the Pearl" Cook and Gwendolyn "Blondy" Chisholm gave tearful eulogies. Tyler Perry receiving a standing ovation with cheers when he addressed the crowd: "I'm tired of seeing us struggle. All of those years, all of those songs, all of that money that was owed to her – where is it? It’s wrong, this is wrong, and I’m tired of seeing us struggle and go through things and work hard and not reap the benefits of what we were supposed to reap. Fair is not too much to ask." In June 2025, Brittney Spencer performed "No More Rain (In This Cloud)" at the BET Awards 2025. A second ceremony was held in her hometown, Columbia, South Carolina, on March 15, 2025. However, the BET Awards came under fire as Stone was not mentioned or featured during the "In Memoriam" segment of the show; a tribute honoring and remembering Black entertainers who died from 2024 through 2025. Historic Columbia, a non-profit organization in the hometown of Angie Stone, organized a special tribute act dedicated to Angie Stone for the annual Jubilee: Festival of Black History & Culture which took place on September 20, 2025.

On September 2, 2025, a wrongful death lawsuit was filed in Gwinnett County State Court that contained allegations that Stone was alive after the Sprinter van she was in overturned, she tried to escape, and the tractor-trailer truck that crashed into the van caused her death. The lawsuit defendants include the drivers and owners of both the truck and the van, the truck manufacturer Daimler Truck North America, the truck driver Jared Wilkinson, and the van driver Leethel Carter, as well as the producer of the collision mitigation system that was in the truck.

=== Posthumous sales ===
Stone's music catalog earned more than 621,000 official on-demand American music streams in the week preceding her death from February 21 to February 27. During the week of her death, the figure rose 1,263% to more than 8.4 million official streams. Her song "No More Rain (In This Cloud)" became one of her biggest streaming song during the week of her death, collecting 2.1 million official on-demand American streams – a 538% boost from the week prior. The song "Wish I Didn't Miss You" rose 1,008% during the week of February 28 to March 6, collecting 1.44 million official on-demand American streams. Her song "Brotha" also experienced one of the biggest streaming boosts in Stone's catalog following her death. During the week of February 21 and February 27, the song earned slightly more than 42,000 official on-demand American steams. The following week, that figure leapt 2,026% to more than 907,000 official streams. Additionally, all three songs debuted in the top five of the R&B Digital Song Sales chart dated March 15: "No More Rain (In This Cloud)" debuted at number one, "Wish I Didn't Miss You" debuted at number two, and "Brotha" debuted at number five. The former two remained on the chart for two weeks.

== Personal life ==
=== Marriage and relationships ===
In 1980, Stone began dating rapper Lil' Rodney C! of the hip-hop group Funky Four Plus One More. In 1983, the couple married without publicity. In 1984, Stone gave birth to her daughter Diamond Stone, who became a singer and songwriter. Stone eventually named her first solo album Black Diamond after her daughter. In late 1980s, Stone and Lil' Rodney C! divorced. In the early 1990s, Stone began dating her Vertical Hold groupmate David Bright. The couple's relationship began to dissolve in 1992. In response, Stone wrote the song "Seems You're Much Too Busy", which became the lead single of Vertical Hold's debut album A Matter of Time.

In 1994, Stone began dating singer D'Angelo after the couple met while working on his first album Brown Sugar. Inspired by their relationship, the couple wrote several songs together, including "Send It On". In 1997, Stone gave birth to their son Michael Archer Jr, who became a musician who performs under the stage name Swayvo Twain. In 1999, Stone ended her relationship with D'Angelo, citing infidelity after the birth of his second child. In 2009, she began dating Ashanti Graves who became her manager. Although the couple became engaged, the relationship ended when Stone discovered that Graves had an alleged affair with a staff member of the production crew on the set of R&B Divas: Atlanta.

=== Health ===
In 2009, Stone disclosed that she was diagnosed with Type 2 diabetes in 1999. She later became part of the F.A.C.E Diabetes (Fearless African-Americans Connected and Empowered) program sponsored by Eli Lilly and Company, which helps African Americans understand their risk for diabetes and how to control it. Stone said that both her mother and her mother's sister were diabetic. In 2010, Stone had disclosed that she had battled sarcoidosis for an undisclosed period of twelve years. During the recording of Vertical Hold's second album Head First, Stone revealed that she had lost 70 pounds in 1995. By 1999, Stone had weighed 230 pounds, which she attributed the weight gain to taking the prescribed steroid medication prednisone to manage her sarcoidosis. In mid-2023, Stone became the subject of a death hoax after a viral picture began circulating on social media depicting her in a wheelchair and head wrap. Stone later debunked the rumor, stating that she had temporarily wheelchair-bound due to a sprained ankle. In late 2024, Stone was hospitalized for two weeks due to a bacterial blood infection.

=== Activism ===
In response to being diagnosed with diabetes, Stone founded a national non-profit organization called Angel Stripes. The organization aimed to bring awareness of the arts to local communities and preserve art programs for the youth. The organization also aimed to protect the voting rights of senior citizens.

== Legacy ==
Angie Stone has been recognized as a pioneer of both hip-hop and neo soul music. As part of the female hip hop group The Sequence, Stone became one of the first female rappers to have an original hip-hop record "Funk You Up" sell more than a half of a million copies worldwide, as well as to be released on vinyl by a female act. "Funk You Up" has become one of the most frequently sampled songs in music history, most notably in hip hop music.

In June 2021, Stone was presented with the Soul Music Icon Award at the Black Music Honors. In June 2024, Stone was inducted into the Women Songwriters Hall of Fame. An honorary member of Zeta Phi Beta Sorority, Incorporated, she was also inducted at the sorority's Boulé in Indianapolis, Indiana in July 2024. In September 2025, Stone was selected for induction into the National Rhythm and Blues Hall of Fame due to her trailblazing 45-year career.

== Discography ==
Studio albums

- Black Diamond (1999)
- Mahogany Soul (2001)
- Stone Love (2004)
- The Art of Love & War (2007)
- Unexpected (2009)
- Rich Girl (2012)
- Dream (2015)
- Covered in Soul (2016)
- Full Circle (2019)
- Love Language (2023)

== Filmography ==
=== Films ===
List of films and roles
Year	Title	Role
2002	The Hot Chick	Madame Mambuza
2003	The Fighting Temptations	Alma
2008	Caught on Tape	Diane
2009	Pastor Brown	Rick Fredericks
2010	School Gyrls	Headmaster Jones
2010	Baby Mama's Club	Mrs. Jackson
2012	The Wonder Girls	Betty
2012	A Cross to Bear	Sunshine
2013	Dreams	Marlene
2014	Ride Along	Market Shopper
2014	My Other Mother	Delores
2016	To Love the Soul of a Woman	Ursula Sanders
2021	Entanglement	Sadie

=== Television ===
List of television appearances and roles
Year	Title	Role	Notes
2000	Moesha	Herself	"D-Money Loses His Patience" (season 5, episode 22)
2002	Girlfriends	Darla Mason	"Blinded by the Lights" (season 3, episode 7)
2004	One on One	Herself	"It's a Mad, Mad, Mad, Mad Hip Hop World" (season 3, episode 14)
2008	Lincoln Heights	Octavia	"Prom Night" (season 3, episode 9) "The Ground Beneath Our Feet" (season 3, episode 10)
2013–2014	R&B Divas: Atlanta	Herself	(season 2 – 3, main)
2014	Celebrity Wife Swap	Herself	1 episode
2023	Heaux Phase	Margaret	

=== Theatre ===
List of stage roles
Year	Title	Role
2003	Chicago	Big Mama Morton
2011	Loving Him Is Killing Me	Mutha
2013	Love Lies	Victoria Davis

== Tours ==
Headlining tours

- Mahogany Soul Tour (2002)

Co-headlining tours

- BK Got Music Summer Soul Tour (with Luther Vandross, Gerald Levert, and Michelle Williams) (2002)
- Silk and Sandpaper Tour (with Anthony Hamilton) (2004)
- Sisters in the Spirit Tour (with Shirley Caesar, Dorinda Clark-Cole, Nicole C. Mullen, and Kelly Price) (2007)

Opening act

- Now Tour (2001)

Residencies

- Blue Note Tokyo (2007)

== Awards and nominations ==
Year	Award	Category	Nominee(s)	Result	Ref.
2000	Soul Train Lady of Soul Awards	Best Solo R&B/Soul New Artist	Angie Stone	Won	
2000	Soul Train Lady of Soul Awards	Best Solo R&B/Soul Single	"No More Rain (In This Cloud)"	Won	
2000	Soul Train Music Awards	Best New Artist	Angie Stone	Nominated	
2001	MOBO Awards	Best Jazz Act	Angie Stone	Nominated	
2002	Soul Train Music Awards	Best R&B/Soul Single – Female	"Brotha"	Nominated	
2003	Black Reel Awards	Best Original or Adapted Song	"Bring Your Heart" (from Brown Sugar)	Nominated	
2003	DanceStar Awards	Best Chart Act	Angie Stone	Nominated	
2003	DanceStar Awards	Best Remix Award	"Wish I Didn't Miss You"	Nominated	
2003	Grammy Awards	Best R&B Performance by a Duo or Group with Vocals	"More Than a Woman" (with Joe)	Nominated	
2003	Soul Train Music Awards	Best R&B/Soul Album – Female	Mahogany Soul	Nominated	
2004	Edison Awards	R&B/Hip Hop	Stone Love	Won	
2005	Grammy Awards	Best Female R&B Vocal Performance	"U-Haul"	Nominated	
2008	Grammy Awards	Best R&B Performance by a Duo or Group with Vocals	"Baby" (with Betty Wright)	Nominated	
2008	BET Awards	BET Centric Award	Angie Stone	Nominated	
2021	Black Music Honors	Soul Music Icon Award	Angie Stone	Won	
