= Baby (Angie Stone song) =

Single by Angie Stone featuring Betty Wright

from the album The Art of Love & War
- Released: August 28, 2007
- Length: 4:50
- Label: Stax
- Songwriter(s): Angie Stone; Corey Tatum; Kevin Norton; Curtis Mayfield
- Producer(s): 5 Star; Co-T

Angie Stone singles chronology
"I Wasn't Kidding" (2005)	"Baby" (2007)	"Sometimes" (2008)

"Baby" is a song by American recording artist Angie Stone. It was written by Stone along with Corey "Co-T" Tatum and Kevin "5 Star" Norton for her fourth studio album, The Art of Love & War (2007), while production was helmed by Tatum and Noton 5 Star. The song is built around a sample of "Give Me Your Love (Love Song)" by Curtis Mayfield. Due to the inclusion of the sample, Mayfield is also credited as a songwriter. It served as the album's first single as well as Stone's debut released with Stax Records. "Baby" became her second song to reach the top of Billboard's Adult R&B Songs in the United States.

== Music video ==
A music video for "Baby" was directed by Maeyen A. Bassey. It features comedian Mike Epps as Stone's love interest, while Eva Pigford appears as a movie starlet. Singer Raz-B makes a cameo appearance in the clip.

== Track listings ==
Promo CD single
No.	Title	Length
1.	"Baby" (radio edit)	4:21
2.	"Baby" (album version)	4:24
3.	"Baby" (instrumental)	4:53
4.	"Baby" (acappella)	4:24

== Personnel ==
- Alex Al – bass guitar
- Michael Butler – guitar
- Khaliq "Khaliq-O-Vision" Glover – mixing
- Jon Nettlesbey – mixing
- Rex Rideout – piano
- Angie Stone – vocals
- Diamond Stone – backing vocals
- Tianna Vallen – backing vocals
- Betty Wright – vocals

== Charts ==
=== Weekly charts ===
Weekly chart performance for "Baby"
Chart (2007)	Peak position
Global Dance Songs (Billboard)	37
US Bubbling Under Hot 100 (Billboard)	3
US Adult R&B Songs (Billboard)	1
US Dance Club Songs (Billboard)	3
US Hot R&B/Hip-Hop Songs (Billboard)	22

=== Year-end charts ===
Year-end chart performance for "Baby"
Chart (2007)	Peak position
US Adult R&B Songs (Billboard)	18
US Hot R&B/Hip-Hop Songs (Billboard)	91
