= I Wasn't Kidding =

Single by Angie Stone

from the album Stone Hits: The Very Best of Angie Stone
- Released: October 10, 2005
- Length: 4:28
- Label: J
- Songwriters: Andrea Martin; Adrian Austin; Cecil Womack; Linda Womack
- Producers: Andrea Martin; Vada Nobles

Angie Stone singles chronology
"Stay for a While" (2004)	"I Wasn't Kidding" (2005)	"Baby" (2007)

"I Wasn't Kidding" is a song by American singer Angie Stone. It was written by Andrea Martin and Adrian Austin for Stone's first greatest hits album, Stone Hits: The Very Best of Angie Stone (2005), while production was overseen by Martin and Vada Nobles. The song is built around a sample from the 1984 record "Baby I'm Scared of You" as written and performed by Womack & Womack.

== Background ==
"I Wasn't Kidding" was written by Andrea Martin and Adrian Austin. Inspired by Martin's wish to use the beat of the Womack & Womack song "Baby I'm Scared of You" (1984) in a new "break-up song," much of the lyrics were penned by Austin.

== Critical reception ==
Billboard felt that "Stone conjures the 1980s with the booty-bumping" song and declared "I Wasn't Kidding" a "fun track, a stellar vocal and deserving entry on Stone Hits: The Very Best of Angie Stone. South African news website Independent Online called the song "a great old school jam."

== Track listing ==
Digital single
No.	Title	Length
1.	"I Wasn't Kidding" (radio edit)	4:30
2.	"I Wasn't Kidding" (extended version)	5:06
3.	"I Wasn't Kidding" (instrumental)	4:31
4.	"I Wasn't Kidding" (tv track)	4:31
5.	"I Wasn't Kidding" (acapella)	4:19

== Personnel ==
- Kamel Abdo – recording engineer
- Adrian Austin – writer
- Justin Goodman – bass
- Jason Groucott – recording engineer
- Andrea Martin – arranger, producer, strings, writer
- Tony Maserati – mixing engineer
- Vada Nobles – producer
- Sax – guitars
- Keith Warren – strings
- Stuart White – recording engineer
- Cecil Womack – writer (sample)
- Linda Womack – writer (sample)

== Charts ==
=== Weekly charts ===
Weekly chart performance for "I Wasn't Kidding"
Chart (2005)	Peak position
Belgium (Ultratip Bubbling Under Flanders)	13
Global Dance Songs (Billboard)	36
US Adult R&B Songs (Billboard)	35
US Dance Club Songs (Billboard)	17

=== Year-end charts ===
2005 year-end chart performance for "I Wasn't Kidding"
Chart (2005)	Position
UK Urban (Music Week)	26

== Release history ==
Release history for "I Wasn't Kidding"
Region	Date	Format(s)	Label(s)	Ref.
United States	October 10, 2005	Urban contemporary radio; urban AC radio	J; RMG	
