= Unexpected (Angie Stone album) =

Studio album by Angie Stone
- Released: November 23, 2009
- Length: 39:26
- Label: Stax
- Producers: Angie Stone (also exec.); John McClain (exec.); John Burk (exec.); Saleem Asad; Cozmo; Terrance Freeman; Jazze Pha; Karrim King; Melvin Lowery, Jr.; One Drop Scott; Fitzroy Reid; Jonathan Richmond; Willie Shivers; Steven White; Sly Williams

Angie Stone chronology
The Art of Love & War (2007)	Unexpected (2009)	Rich Girl (2012)

Singles from Unexpected
- 1. "I Ain't Hearin' U" Released: October 12, 2009; 2. "Free" Released: March 14, 2010

Unexpected is the fifth studio album by American singer Angie Stone. It was released by Stax Records on November 23, 2009, in United States. Conceived following the death of her father, Stone's spiritual anchor and creative mentor, the album marked a breakaway from the neo soul elements on Stone's first four studio efforts, taking her work further into the dance pop, funk, and contemporary R&B genres. As a result, Unexpected incorporates more upbeat material, produced by Jazze Pha, among others.

The album received generally positive reviews, with critics perceiving its sound as more stylistically diverse than on previous discs. Commercially, Unexpected became Stone's lowest-charting entry yet. It peaked at number 17 on the US Billboard Top R&B/Hip-Hop Albums but failed to reach the upper half of the Billboard 200. Lead single "I Ain't Hearin' U," released in October 2009, reached the top 20 of the Adult R&B Songs chart. The album marked Stone's final release with Stax Records.

== Background ==
Much of Unexpected was produced in response to the sudden death of Stone's father, who died mid-way through the recording process of the album. Grief-stricken and struggling with vocal recordings, Stone abandoned the possibility to record another "kind of neo-soul record" and instead requested more upbeat, joyful material to record. In an interview with Windy City Times, Stone said: "My father passed away unexpectedly this year, and that was a shock to me. When I recorded the album, I didn't have a title so I said, "This is so unexpected. So I'm gonna go for broke and do whatever the hell I want to do."

While she feet obliged to record "some classic Angie Stone" material for the album," much of the album was inspired by singer Evelyn "Champagne" King. Upon the album's release in the United Kingdom in February 2010, Stone told Blues & Soul: "Being as I've delivered four decent albums already, I felt it was safe to switch up and do something different this time. And musically overall I just wanted to have fun. I wanted to do something that embodies a jam kinda feel, so that we could have some fun in concert and show people everything doesn't always have to be so serious."

== Promotion ==
The album was preceded by lead single "I Ain't Hearin' U," an uptempo song about gossip and innuendo that Stone co-wrote with longtime collaborator Juanita Wynn. Premiered on Stone's website on October 5, 2009, and released digitally by Stax Records on October 12, 2009, it reached number 42 on Billboard's Hot R&B/Hip-Hop Songs chart and peaked at number 14 on the Adult R&B Songs chart. A remixed version of "Free", a "fast club" track that was contributed by producer Jazze Pha, was released as the second and final single from the album. Featuring additional vocals by rapper Young Nate, it failed to chart.

== Critical reception ==
Professional ratings
Aggregate scores
Source	Rating
Metacritic	67/100
Review scores
Source	Rating
About.com	3.5/5 stars
AllMusic	3.5/5 stars
Clash	8/10
Entertainment Weekly	B−
The Independent	3/5 stars
PopMatters	8/10

Unexpected received a weighted score of 67 out of 100 from review aggregate website Metacritic, indicating "generally favorable reviews", based on nine reviews from music critics. In his review for Clash, Kevin Angel declared the album Stone's "strongest to date, as she delivers an LP that effortlessly combines the finest elements of neo soul with old-skool R&B. The album sees Stone lay down some of her most honest tunes to date." Chris Roberts from BBC Music called the album "a likeable blend of soul and funk with judicious little dashes of rap," adding: "It’s a neo-soul record. A very good one, because that’s what she does, her passionate voice bringing abundant personality [...] The album’s unsurprising, and often unconscionably fine."

AllMusic editor Thom Jurek found that with Unexpected Stone "delves deeper into funk and hip-hop than on her previous outings [...] These dozen tracks continue to reveal her versatility as a vocalist and recording artist; she can sing whatever it is she wants to with equal verve, authenticity, and flair. Despite the slicker and more diverse sounds on Unexpected, the soul quotient is high, even if this isn’t strictly a neo-soul album [...] Unexpected simply feels like a leap more than a step." Tyler Lewis from PopMatters noted that "it’s another great Angie Stone record that gives you plenty to savor [...] She is singular in her ability to be among the most stylistically diverse contemporary artists of our time, without being flashy about it. By now, Stone should know that we know this and love her for it. That she doesn’t, is perhaps, what’s really unexpected."

The Boston Globe journalist Siddhartha Mitter wrote that Unexpected offers "more musical variety than previous discs," adding that "Stone needn’t fret about keeping up with the Beyoncés; her church-infused, middle-class songs carry a proud legacy, and when she decries her 'haters', it rings false." Mitter felt that Stone shines most on the ballads, which she called "classic slow jams of the old school, a sadly fading form of which Stone is one of the great current purveyors." Critical with its misleading title, Simon Vozick-Levinson from Entertainment Weekly noted that "for the most part, Unexpected is one tasteful midtempo jam after another, with Stone’s honey-sweet harmonies unfolding over easygoing throwback vibes. That’s not necessarily a bad thing – the neo-soul approach has always suited Stone. But this is precisely what her old fans expect by now, and it’s unlikely to reel in many new ones." Q magazine found that the "album mixes positive-message R&B, hip hop and funk with variable and often unsubstantial results."

== Commercial performance ==
Unexpected debuted at number 133 on the US Billboard 200 and number 17 on the Top R&B/Hip-Hop Albums chart, with first week sales of 10,000 units. A major drop from her previous effort The Art of Love & War (2007), which had opened at number 11 on the Billboard 200, the album marked her lowest-charting entry yet. It was however ranked 93rd on Billboard's Top R&B/Hip-Hop Albums year-end chart.

== Track listing ==
Unexpected track listing
No.	Title	Writer(s)	Producer(s)	Length
1.	"Unexpected"	Stone; Sylvester Stewart; Juanita Wynn	Stone	1:28
2.	"I Ain't Hearin' U"	Steven "Supe" White; Wynn; Willie Lester; Rodney Brown	White	3:27
3.	"Free" (featuring Ricco Barrino)	Phalon Alexander; Barrino; Jevon Sims; Terrance Freeman	Jazze Pha; Freeman^{[a]}	3:57
4.	"Maybe"	Jonathan Richmond; Wynn	Richmond	4:40
5.	"Hey Mr. DJ"	Stone; Richard Rudolph; Sly Williams; Arthur Philips	Williams	2:37
6.	"Kiss All Over Your Body"	Stone; Williams	Williams	4:45
7.	"I Don't Care" (featuring Diamond Stone and Juanita Wynn)	Stone; Wynn; Willie "Chuck" Shivers; Diamond Stone; Scott Roberts; Cozmo Hickox; Saleem Asad	Shivers	3:12
8.	"Why Is It"	Stone; Wynn; Williams	Williams	3:43
9.	"Tell Me" (featuring Dose)	Stone; Wynn; Karrim "Ikon" King; Fitzroy Reid; Michael Thomas	King; Reid	3:16
10.	"Think Sometimes"	Stone; Shivers	Shivers	3:34
11.	"I Found a Keeper"	Stone; Williams; Dalton P. Smith	Williams	3:20
12.	"Unexpected (Reprise)"	Stone; Stewart; Wynn	Stone	1:25
Total length:				39:26

Notes

- ^{^[a]} signifies a co-producer

Sample credits

- "Unexpected" and "Unexpected (Reprise)" contain elements from "Family Affair" by Sly and the Family Stone.
- "I Ain't Hearin' U" contains a sample of "What Are You Waiting for?" by Evelyn "Champagne" King, written by Willie Lester and Rodney Brown.
- "Hey Mr. DJ" samples from "Here We Go" by Minnie Riperton, written by Arthur Phillips and Richard Rudolph.

== Charts ==
=== Weekly charts ===
Weekly chart performance for Unexpected
Chart (2009)	Peak position
US Billboard 200	133
US Top R&B/Hip-Hop Albums (Billboard)	17

=== Year-end charts ===
Year-end chart performance for Unexpected
Chart (2009)	Position
US Top R&B/Hip-Hop Albums (Billboard)	93

== Release history ==
Release history and formats for Unexpected
Region	Date	Format(s)	Label	Ref.
United States	November 23, 2009	CD; digital download	Stax	
