= Ashanti discography =

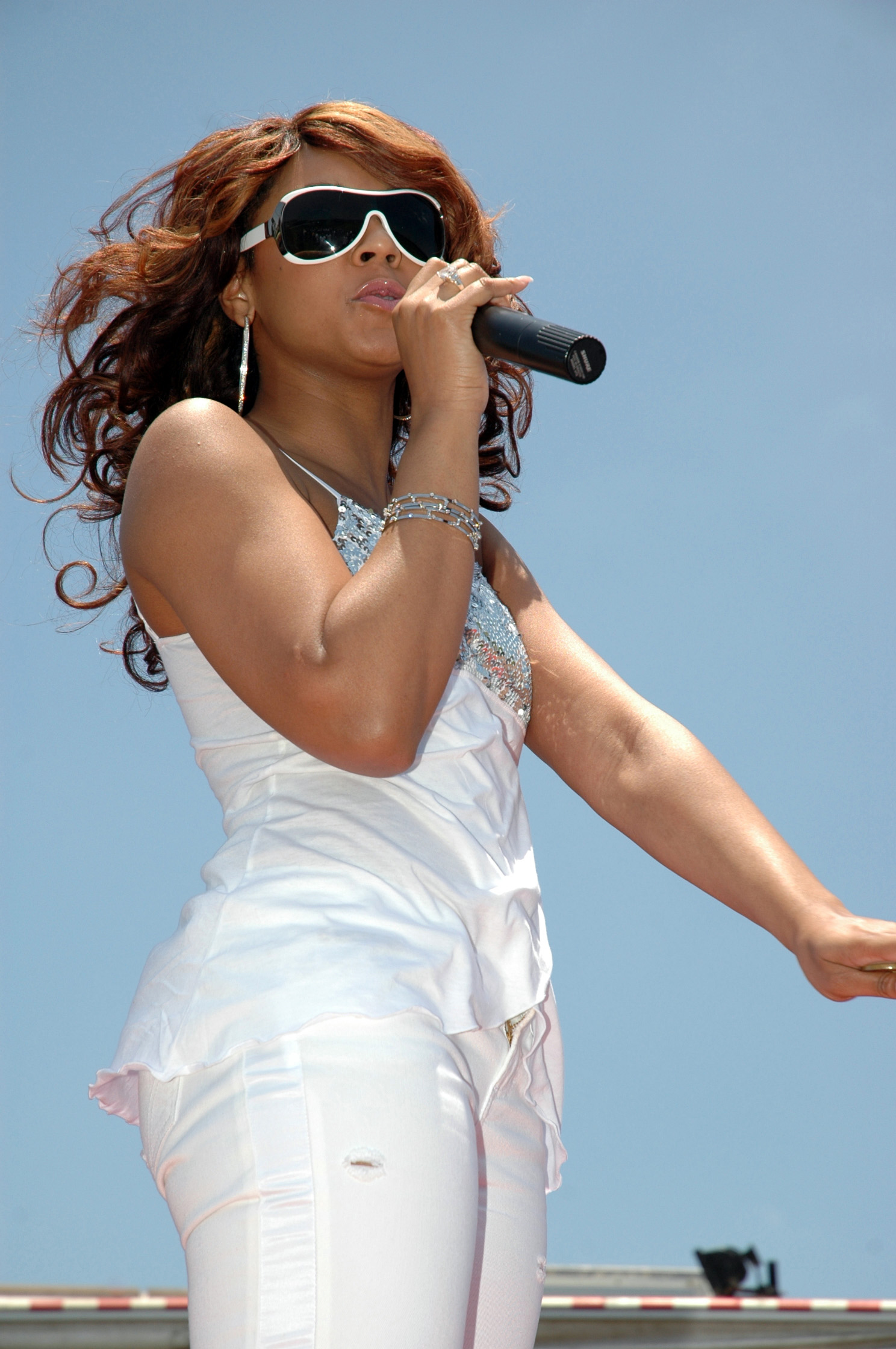
- Ashanti performing in June 2005
- Studio albums: 6
- Soundtrack albums: 6
- Compilation albums: 3
- Singles: 23
- Video albums: 2
- Music videos: 23

As of March 2014, American pop and R&B singer Ashanti has released six studio albums, twenty-four singles, and twenty-one music videos on her record labels Murder Inc., Def Jam, and Motown.

Ashanti's eponymous debut album was released in April 2002, and sold over three million copies in the United States. It produced the number-one hit "Foolish", the top ten hit "Happy" and the top twenty single "Baby". Her second album Chapter II (2003), another platinum-seller, was released a year after and enjoyed international chart success, spawning the top ten hits "Rock wit U (Awww Baby)" and "Rain on Me". The singer's third studio album Concrete Rose was released in December 2004 stateside and certified platinum by the RIAA one month after release. A minor success in international music markets, however it produced two singles only, including the top twenty hit single "Only U". Following a hiatus and a label switch from Murda Inc to Motown, Ashanti's The Declaration (2008) was released in June 2008 in the United States. Throughout her career Ashanti has sold nearly 15 million records worldwide.

== Albums ==
=== Studio albums ===
Title	Details	Peak chart positions										Certifications
Title	Details	US	AUS	CAN	FRA	GER	JPN	NLD	NZ	SWI	UK	Certifications
Ashanti	Released: April 2, 2002; Label: Murder Inc., Island Def Jam; Format: CD	1	10	5	29	10	14	12	15	15	3	RIAA: 3× Platinum; ARIA: Gold; BPI: Platinum; IFPI SWI: Gold; MC: 2× Platinum; RMNZ: Platinum
Chapter II	Released: July 1, 2003; Label: Murder Inc., Island Def Jam; Format: CD	1	19	5	62	12	9	26	22	9	5	RIAA: Platinum; BPI: Gold
Ashanti's Christmas	Released: November 18, 2003; Label: Murder Inc.; Format: CD	160	—	—	—	—	48	—	—	—	—	
Concrete Rose	Released: December 14, 2004; Label: Murder Inc., Def Jam; Format: CD	7	89	65	98	36	16	73	—	66	25	RIAA: Platinum; BPI: Gold
The Declaration	Released: June 3, 2008; Label: The Inc., Universal; Format: CD	6	—	—	—	—	26	—	—	—	119	
Braveheart	Released: March 4, 2014; Label: Written Entertainment, eOne Music; Formats: CD, digital download	10	—	—	—	—	—	—	—	—	—	
"—" denotes items which were not released in that country or failed to chart.

=== Compilation albums ===
Title	Details	Peak
Title	Details	US
Collectables by Ashanti	Released: December 6, 2005; Label: Murder Inc./Def Jam; Format: CD	59
Can't Stop	Released: January 25, 2006; Label: Stomp, Black Claw, Simply Music, Big; Format: CD	—
The Vault	Released: February 18, 2009; Label: AJM Records/The Orchard; Format: Digital download	—
"—" denotes items which were not released in that country or failed to chart.

== Extended plays ==
Title	Details	Peak
Title	Details	US
7 Series Sampler	Released: May 20, 2003; Label: Murder Inc./Island Def Jam; Formats: CD	142
A Wonderful Christmas with Ashanti	Released: December 3, 2013; Label: Written Entertainment, eOne Music; Formats: CD, digital download	—

== Singles ==
=== As lead artist ===
List of singles, with selected chart positions
Title	Year	Peak chart positions										Certifications	Album
Title	Year	US	AUS	CAN	FRA	GER	IRE	NLD	NZ	SWI	UK	Certifications	Album
"Foolish"	2002	1	6	—	62	26	14	12	8	15	4	RIAA: 2× Platinum; ARIA: Platinum; BPI: Platinum; RMNZ: 2× Platinum	Ashanti
"Happy"	2002	8	29	—	40	41	22	10	19	24	13	BPI: Silver; RMNZ: Gold	Ashanti
"Baby"	2002	15	—	—	—	89	—	48	—	—	—		Ashanti
"Rock wit U (Awww Baby)"	2003	2	19	4	—	41	21	28	24	33	7	BPI: Gold; RMNZ: Platinum	Chapter II
"Rain on Me"	2003	7	—	27	—	70	—	—	—	85	19		Chapter II
"Breakup 2 Makeup" (Remix) (featuring Black Child)	2004	—	—	—	—	—	—	—	—	—	—		Collectables by Ashanti
"Only U"	2004	13	24	—	33	12	4	18	14	12	2	RIAA: Gold; BPI: Silver	Concrete Rose
"Don't Let Them"	2005	—	—	—	—	—	41	—	—	—	38		Concrete Rose
"Still on It" (featuring Paul Wall and Method Man)	2005	— (Note: "Still on It" did not chart on the Billboard Hot 100 but peaked at number 15 on the Billboard Bubbling Under Hot 100 chart, which is a 25-song addendum to the Billboard Hot 100.)	—	—	—	—	—	—	—	—	—		Collectables by Ashanti
"The Way That I Love You"	2008	37	96	—	—	—	—	—	—	—	—		The Declaration
"Good Good"	2008	—	—	—	—	—	—	—	—	—	—		The Declaration
"The Woman You Love" (featuring Busta Rhymes)	2011	—	—	—	—	—	—	—	—	—	—		Non-album single
"Never Should Have"	2013	—	—	—	—	—	—	—	—	—	—		Braveheart
"I Got It" (featuring Rick Ross)	2013	—	—	—	—	—	—	—	—	—	—		Braveheart
"Early in the Morning" (featuring French Montana)	2014	—	—	—	—	—	—	—	—	—	—		Braveheart
"Let's Go"	2015	—	—	—	—	—	—	—	—	—	—		Non-album singles
"Say Less" (featuring Ty Dolla $ign)	2017	—	—	—	—	—	—	—	—	—	—		Non-album singles
"Pretty Little Thing" (featuring Afro B)	2019	—	—	—	—	—	—	—	—	—	—		Non-album singles
"2:35 (I Want You)"	2021	—	—	—	—	—	—	—	—	—	—		Non-album singles
"Baby" (with Aitch)	2022	—	—	—	—	—	5	—	— (Note: "Baby" did not enter the NZ Top 40 Singles Chart, but peaked at number 10 on the NZ Hot Singles Chart.)	—	2	ARIA: Platinum; BPI: Platinum; RMNZ: Gold	Non-album singles
"Falling for You"	2022	—	—	—	—	—	—	—	—	—	—		Non-album singles
"—" denotes items which were not released in that country or failed to chart.

=== As featured artist ===
Title	Year	Peak chart positions										Certifications	Album
Title	Year	US	AUS	CAN	FRA	GER	IRE	NLD	NZ	SWI	UK	Certifications	Album
"Always on Time" (Ja Rule featuring Ashanti)	2001	1	3	16	45	22	22	12	2	4	6	ARIA: Gold; BPI: 2× Platinum; RMNZ: 3× Platinum	Pain Is Love
"What's Luv?" (Fat Joe featuring Ja Rule and Ashanti)	2002	2	4	12	27	10	17	7	5	2	4	ARIA: Gold; BPI: 2× Platinum; RMNZ: 4× Platinum	Jealous Ones Still Envy (J.O.S.E.)
"Down 4 U" (Irv Gotti featuring Ja Rule, Ashanti, Charli Baltimore and Vita)	2002	6	—	—	—	54	—	39	23	43	4		Irv Gotti Presents: The Inc.
"Mesmerize" (Ja Rule featuring Ashanti)	2003	2	5	19	66	71	19	39	3	79	12	ARIA: Platinum; BPI: Gold; RMNZ: 2× Platinum	The Last Temptation
"Into You" (Fabolous featuring Tamia or Ashanti)	2003	4	—	—	—	—	—	—	—	—	—	BPI: Silver; RMNZ: Gold	Street Dreams
"Wonderful" (Ja Rule featuring R. Kelly and Ashanti)	2004	5	6	—	—	20	12	13	6	12	1	RIAA: Gold; ARIA: Gold; BPI: Silver	R.U.L.E.
"Southside" (Lloyd featuring Ashanti)	2004	24	—	—	—	—	—	—	—	—	—	RIAA: Platinum; MC: Gold; RMNZ: Gold	Southside
"Jimmy Choo" (Shyne featuring Ashanti)	2004	—	—	—	—	—	—	—	—	—	—		Godfather Buried Alive
"Wake Up Everybody" (with Various Artists)	2004	—	—	—	—	—	—	—	—	—	—		Wake Up Everybody
"Pac's Life" (2Pac featuring Ashanti and T.I.)	2006	—	34	—	—	31	9	—	38	—	21	RMNZ: Gold	Pac's Life
"Put a Little Umph in It" (Jagged Edge featuring Ashanti)	2007	—	—	—	—	—	—	—	—	—	—		Baby Makin' Project
"Body on Me" (Nelly featuring Akon and Ashanti)	2008	42	32	57	—	—	12	—	19	—	17	BPI: Silver; RMNZ: Platinum	Brass Knuckles
"Just Stand Up!" (with Artists Stand Up to Cancer)	2008	11	39	—	—	—	—	—	19	—	26		Charity single
"Want It, Need It" (Plies featuring Ashanti)	2009	96	—	—	—	—	—	—	—	—	—		Da Realist
"Just Believe" (with Artie Green, Gerry Gunn and Robbie Nova)	2013	—	—	—	—	—	—	—	—	—	—		Non-album singles
"Early in the Morning" (Willie XO featuring Ashanti)	2019	—	—	—	—	—	—	—	—	—	—		Non-album singles
"Nasty" (DaBaby featuring Ashanti and Megan Thee Stallion)	2020	50	—	—	—	—	—	—	—	—	—	RIAA: Gold	Blame It on Baby
"Fall Slowly" (Joyner Lucas featuring Ashanti)	2020	—	—	—	—	—	—	—	—	—	—	RIAA: Gold	Evolution
"This Lil' Game We Play" (Jermaine Dupri featuring Nelly, Ashanti and Juicy J)	2024	—	—	—	—	—	—	—	—	—	—		Non-album single
"—" denotes items which were not released in that country or failed to chart.

=== Promotional singles ===
List of promotional singles, showing year released and album name
Title	Year	Album
"Dreams"	2003	Ashanti
"Turn It Up" (featuring Ja Rule)	2004	Concrete Rose
"Don't Leave Me Alone" (featuring 7 Aurelius)	2005	Concrete Rose
"Switch" (featuring Nelly)	2007	Non-album single
"Hey Baby (After the Club)"	2007	The Declaration
"Never Too Far Away" (from the Motion Picture Dream House)	2011	Braveheart
"No One Greater" (featuring French Montana and Meek Mill)	2012	Non-album singles
"That's What We Do" (featuring R. Kelly)	2012	Non-album singles
"Pride N Joy" (Remix) (Fat Joe featuring Trey Songz, Pusha T, Ashanti and Miguel)	2012	Non-album singles

== Other certified songs ==
List of other certified songs, showing year released and album name
Title	Year	Certifications	Album
"Unfoolish"	2002	BPI: Silver; RMNZ: Platinum	Ashanti

== Guest appearances ==
Year	Song	Album
2001	"POV City Anthem" (Caddillac Tah featuring Ashanti)	POV City Anthem (Album Sample)
2001	"Just Like a Thug" (Caddillac Tah featuring Ashanti)	POV City Anthem (Album Sample)
2001	"How We Roll" (Big Pun featuring Ashanti)	Endangered Species
2001	"The INC." (Ja Rule featuring Ashanti, Caddillac Tah and Black Child)	Pain Is Love
2001	"Always on Time" (Ja Rule introducing Ashanti)	Pain Is Love
2002	"What's Luv?" (Fat Joe featuring Ja Rule and Ashanti)	Jealous Ones Still Envy (J.O.S.E.)
2002	"Unfoolish" (Remix) (Ashanti featuring The Notorious B.I.G.)	We Invented the Remix
2002	"Down 4 U" (Irv Gotti featuring Ashanti, Ja Rule, Charli Baltimore and Vita)	Irv Gotti Presents: The Inc.
2002	"No One Does It Better" (Irv Gotti featuring Charli Baltimore and Ashanti)	Irv Gotti Presents: The Inc.
2002	"The Pledge" (Irv Gotti featuring Ashanti and Caddillac Tah)	Irv Gotti Presents: The Inc.
2002	"The Pledge" (Remix) (Irv Gotti featuring Ja Rule, Ashanti and Nas)	Irv Gotti Presents: The Remixes
2002	"Come-N-Go" (Irv Gotti featuring Ja Rule, Ashanti and Cadillac Tah)	Irv Gotti Presents: The Remixes
2002	"Baby" (Remix) (Irv Gotti featuring Ashanti)	Irv Gotti Presents: The Remixes
2002	"Happy" (Remix) (Irv Gotti featuring Ashanti and Charli Baltimore)	Irv Gotti Presents: The Remixes
2002	"No One Does It Better" (Remix) (Irv Gotti featuring Ashanti and Charli Baltimore)	Irv Gotti Presents: The Remixes
2002	"Baby" (Remix) (Irv Gotti featuring Ashanti and Scarface)	Irv Gotti Presents: The Remixes
2002	"No One Does It Better" (Remix) (Irv Gotti featuring Ashanti, Ja Rule, Caddillac Tah and Black Child)	Irv Gotti Presents: The Remixes
2002	"Baby" (Remix) (Irv Gotti featuring Ashanti and Crooked I)	Irv Gotti Presents: The Remixes
2003	"Into You" (Fabolous featuring Ashanti)	Street Dreams
2003	"Mesmerize" (Ja Rule featuring Ashanti)	The Last Temptation
2003	"The Pledge" (Remix) (Ja Rule featuring Ashanti and Nas)	The Last Temptation
2004	"Wonderful" (Ja Rule featuring Ashanti and R. Kelly)	R.U.L.E.
2004	"Southside" (Lloyd featuring Ashanti)	Southside
2004	"Southside" (Remix) (Lloyd featuring Ashanti and Scarface)	Southside
2004	"Jimmy Choo" (Shyne featuring Ashanti)	Godfather Buried Alive
2004	"Wake Up Everybody" (featuring various artists)	Wake Up Everybody
2005	"1st Time Again" (Z-Ro featuring Ashanti)	Let the Truth Be Told
2006	"Pac's Life" (2Pac featuring Ashanti and T.I.)	Pac's Life
2007	"Put a Little Umph in It" (Jagged Edge featuring Ashanti)	Baby Makin' Project
2008	"Body on Me" (Nelly featuring Akon and Ashanti)	Brass Knuckles
2008	"Just Stand Up!" (with Artists Stand Up to Cancer)	Charity single
2011	"Changing the Locks" (Jim Jones featuring Ashanti)	Capo
2011	"Soft Rhodes" (Game featuring Ashanti)	Purp & Patron
2012	"Woman to Woman" (Keyshia Cole featuring Ashanti)	Woman to Woman
2013	"Just Believe" (with Artie Green, Gerry Gunn & Robbie Nova)	Songs for a Healthier America
2016	"Seven Day Love" (Belly featuring Ashanti)	Inzombia
2016	"Helpless" (with Ja Rule)	The Hamilton Mixtape
2018	"Start This Shit Off Right" (Lil Wayne featuring Ashanti and Mack Maine)	Tha Carter V
2019	"A Fools Tale (Running Back)" (Tory Lanez featuring Ashanti)	Chixtape 5
2020	"Nasty" (DaBaby featuring Ashanti and Megan Thee Stallion)	Blame It on Baby
2021	”Wockesha” (Remix) (Moneybagg Yo featuring Lil Wayne and Ashanti)	Wockesha - Single

=== Soundtracks ===
Year	Song	Film
2001	"POV City Anthem" (Caddillac Tah featuring Ashanti)	The Fast and the Furious
2001	"When a Man Does Wrong"	The Fast and the Furious
2001	"Justify My Love" (Vita featuring Ashanti)	The Fast and the Furious
2002	"What's Luv?" (Fat Joe featuring Ashanti)	Juwanna Mann
2004	"I Know"	Johnson Family Vacation
2005	"(Gotta Get Outta) Kansas"	The Muppets' Wizard of Oz
2005	"When I'm with You" (Ashanti and The Muppets)	The Muppets' Wizard of Oz
2005	"Good Life"	The Muppets' Wizard of Oz
2011	"Never Too Far Away"	Dream House

== DVDs ==
Year	DVD
2004	Ashanti: The Making of a Star: Released: December 14, 2004 (version one) June 21, 2005 (version two); Label: The Inc./The Island Def Jam Music Group

== Music videos ==
=== As lead artist ===
Year	Song title	Director
2002	"Foolish"	Irv Gotti
2002	"Happy"	Irv Gotti
2002	"Baby"	Irv Gotti and Nia Long
2002	"Baby" (Remix) (featuring Crooked I)	Irv Gotti
2003	"Rock wit U (Awww Baby)"	Paul Hunter
2003	"Rain on Me"	Hype Williams
2003	"Rain on Me" (Remix) (featuring Charli Baltimore, Hussein Fatal and Ja Rule)	Irv Gotti
2003	"Dreams"	N/A
2004	"Breakup 2 Makeup" (Remix) (featuring Black Child)	Juan Carlos
2004	"Only U"	Hype Williams
2005	"Don't Let Them"	Irv Gotti and Ashanti
2005	"Still on It" (featuring Paul Wall and Method Man)	Fat Cats
2008	"The Way That I Love You"	Kevin Bray
2008	"Good Good"	Melina
2011	"The Woman You Love" (featuring Busta Rhymes)	Sean Coles
2013	"Never Should Have"	Sanji
2014	"I Got It" (featuring Rick Ross)	Eif Rivera
2014	"Early in the Morning" (featuring French Montana)	Eif Rivera
2015	"Let's Go"	Carl Addy
2018	"Say Less" (featuring Ty Dolla $ign)	Noyz and L.T. Hutton
2019	"Pretty Little Things" (featuring Afro B)	Eif Rivera
2021	"2:35 (I Want You)"	JaQuel Knight
2021	"Diamonds"	Trey Fanjoy
2022	"Falling For You"	Jet Phynx

=== As featured artist ===
Year	Tile	Director
2001	"POV City Anthem" (Caddillac Tah featuring Ashanti)	
2001	"Just Like a Thug" (Caddillac Tah featuring Ashanti)	
2001	"How We Roll" (Big Pun featuring Ashanti)	
2001	"Justify My Love" (Vita featuring Ashanti)	
2001	"Always on Time" (Ja Rule featuring Ashanti)	Dave Meyers
2002	"What's Luv?" (Fat Joe featuring Ashanti)	Irv Gotti
2002	"Down 4 U" (Irv Gotti featuring Ashanti, Ja Rule, Charli Baltimore and Vita)	Irv Gotti
2002	"The Pledge (Remix)" (Ja Rule featuring Ashanti and Nas)	Irv Gotti
2003	"Mesmerize" (Ja Rule featuring Ashanti)	Irv Gotti
2004	"Southside" (Lloyd featuring Ashanti)	Irv Gotti
2004	"Southside" (Remix) (Lloyd featuring Ashanti and Scarface)	Irv Gotti
2004	"Jimmy Choo" (Shyne featuring Ashanti)	Benny Boom
2004	"Wonderful" (Ja Rule featuring R. Kelly and Ashanti)	Hype Williams
2006	"Pac's Life" (2Pac featuring Ashanti and T.I.)	
2008	"Body on Me" (Nelly featuring Akon and Ashanti)	Benny Boom
2009	"Want It, Need It" (Plies featuring Ashanti)	Yolanda Gerald and Plies
2013	"Just Believe" (with Artie Green, Gerry Gunn & Robbie Nova)	
2018	"Ashanti Remix" (Fabolous featuring Ashanti)	@justgerard
2019	"Early in the Morning" (Willie XO featuring Ashanti)	Mbrella Films
2019	"The Road" (Machel Montano featuring Ashanti)	Director X
2022	"Gotta Move On" (Diddy featuring Bryson Tiller, Yung Miami and Ashanti)	Kid Art
