= Braveheart (Ashanti album) =

Studio album by Ashanti
- Released: March 4, 2014
- Recorded: February 2010 – 2014
- Studios: Charleston Sound (Charleston, SC)
- Genre: R&B
- Length: 52:29
- Labels: Written; eOne
- Producers: Yusuf Sef Millz Alexander; Timothy Bullock; Detail; DJ Clue; Drone; E-Bass; Mista Raja Greene; L.T. Hutton; Rico Love; Pierre Medor; Reefa; 12Keyz; Teetimus; Mansur Zafr

Ashanti chronology
A Wonderful Christmas with Ashanti (2014)	Braveheart (2014)

Singles from Braveheart
- 1. "Never Should Have" Released: March 25, 2013; 2. "I Got It" Released: November 26, 2013; 3. "Early in the Morning" Released: October 14, 2014

Braveheart is the sixth studio album by American singer Ashanti, released on March 4, 2014, by Ashanti's independent record label Written Entertainment. This was her first studio album to be released in six years, with her last studio album having been 2008's The Declaration. It was also her first release since leaving Murder Inc Records.

"Never Should Have" was used in the season 7 finale of the TV show Army Wives, which Ashanti starred in. On November 26, 2013, Ashanti released "I Got It", featuring Rick Ross in support of the album. French Montana, Jeremih and Beenie Man are all featured on the album too. Upon release, the album garnered favorable reviews, with music critics describing Braveheart's sound as an "evolution of R&B" and praising the themes of empowerment, but criticizing the romantic clichés and lack of interesting moments on the album. On the charts, Braveheart opened at number ten on the U.S. Billboard 200, becoming Ashanti's fifth consecutive top-ten album, as well as her first Independent Albums chart topper. It also debuted in the top-thirty of the UK R&B Albums Chart and top-forty of the UK Indie Albums Chart. "Braveheart" is primarily an R&B album with electro, trap, and urban pop influences.

== Background ==
On June 3, 2008, Ashanti released her fourth album The Declaration, which spawned the singles "The Way That I Love You", "Body on Me" (with Akon & Nelly) and "Good Good". The first peaked within the top-forty on the Billboard Hot 100, while "Body on Me" peaked at number forty-two; "Good Good" managed to reach the top-forty on the Hot R&B/Hip-Hop Songs chart. These singles became the lowest charting among Ashanti's career thus far. While The Declaration peaked at number six and sold 86,000 copies in its first week, Concrete Rose (2004) reached number seven with 254,000 copies sold. The Declaration became her first album not to be certified platinum by the Recording Industry Association of America (RIAA). Just under a year later in May 2009 Irv Gotti, the president of Ashanti's label Murder Inc., told MTV News that Ashanti's affiliation with the label was over. He said "The relationship has run its course. The chemistry of what's needed — we're in two totally different places. You're talking to somebody that took her and shaped and molded her and put her out there for the world, and it blew up. We [hold the record] for the [fastest] selling debut by a female R&B artist — 503 [thousand]. We did it! My views and philosophies and her views and philosophies are not meeting up."

On December 15, 2011, "The Woman You Love" featuring American rapper Busta Rhymes was unveiled as the album's lead single and was released for digital download a day later. Trent Fitzgerald of Popcrush wrote "This song is a great start for Ashanti" and expressed great interest in "what she is going to bring in 2012 now that she is an independent woman". The video premiered on BET's 106 & Park on March 13, 2012, and peaked at number 5 on April 23, 2012. "The Woman You Love" debuted at number ninety-seven on the Billboard Hot R&B/Hip-Hop Songs chart for the week of January 7, 2012. Three weeks later the song re-entered at number ninety-five for the week of January 28, 2012. An "R&B Mix" of the song, sans Busta Rhymes, was released on February 14, 2012. "The Woman You Love" peaked at number fifty-nine. "The Woman You Love" was excluded from the final album track list.

== Production ==
In February 2010, Ashanti begun work in recording studios for a brand new album, and in December the same year, Ashanti confirmed that fans could expect new music in 2011. In July 2011, a promo picture was released announcing that new music was on the way and a brand new single was due in August 2011. On July 26, 2011, Ashanti announced that her fifth album would be the first to be independently released via her own newly established record label, Written Entertainment. Details of the label and distribution came out in December, when it was unveiled that Written Entertainment would be independently distributed worldwide through eOne Music. In a press release, the President of eOne Music, Alan Grunblatt said: "eOne is proud to have a partnership with Ashanti and her label Written Entertainment. Ashanti truly has the independent entrepreneurial attitude that eOne was built on, and we're thrilled to be working with her." Ashanti added, "I'm so excited to have my own record label, Written Entertainment. With eOne as my distributor, I feel that their innovative and ambitious approach to the music industry, really gives my label a worldwide presence. They have the top radio people in the business and are hungry to win! The more I learned the business the more I knew this is what I wanted. Ownership is so important. As a business woman this was a great move for me!"

During an interview on 106 & Park, Ashanti stated that there would be two collaborations on the album, one with a male vocalist and one with a female vocalist; Boombox later revealed that the male artist was R. Kelly and the female was Keyshia Cole. Ashanti worked with R. Kelly ("That's What We Do"), Rico Love ("Perfect So Far"), and Keyshia Cole ("Woman to Woman"). In total, Ashanti recorded sixty songs for the album.

== Title and artwork ==
In an interview with Power 99 FM in Los Angeles, Ashanti explained how the Oscar-winning film Braveheart inspired her album title. "The metaphor that I took was basically in the movie you have the Europeans, you have the soldiers from London and the U.K.," she said. "They have the big horses, they have the shields, the guns, the weapons... They're all armored up. And then you have the Scots. They're all raggedy, homemade weapons, and paint on their faces. It's not an even playing ground, so I feel like with the [major labels], they're bossed up. They have the big engine and all the artists signed to them and with the indies, it's depending. It's homemade, it's homegrown. It's a lesser engine. So the metaphor I was using was being brave and putting your blood and guts into it and fighting passionately to win." The album's artwork was released on March 22, 2012. The artwork was described as "The warrior princess strikes a bold pose on the dramatic cover art." The image used is a screenshot from the music video for "The Woman You Love"; it was later revealed on April 13, 2013, that Ashanti flew out to Atlanta to shoot a brand new artwork with photographer Robert Ector. In January 2014, the singer unveiled the brand-new album artwork on her official Instagram account.

== Composition ==
=== Sound and influence ===
Ashanti spoke on the influences of the album, also explaining how the Oscar-winning film Braveheart inspired her album title. "The metaphor that I took was basically in the movie you have the Europeans, you have the soldiers from London and the U.K.," she said. "They have the big horses, they have the shields, the guns, the weapons... They're all armored up. And then you have the Scots. They're all raggedy, homemade weapons, and paint on their faces. It's not an even playing ground, so I feel like with the [major labels], they're bossed up. They have the big engine and all the artists signed to them and with the indies, it's depending. It's homemade, it's homegrown. It's a lesser engine. So the metaphor I was using was being brave and putting your blood and guts into it and fighting passionately to win."

=== Songs and lyrics ===
The album opens with a monologue introduction spoken by Ashanti in which she says; "A lot of people counted me out and that feeds my hunger and ignites my passion to continue my journey, I will continue to thrive, continue to prosper, I will continue to be brave. I am Braveheart." "She Can't" was produced by Mansur, which was described as a sexy mid-tempo number with a chaotic beat. "Never Should Have", also produced by Mansur, sees the singer cooing over a former lover she now regrets over a marching band-driven beat. Rico Love co-wrote the guitar-laden track "Perfect So Far".

== Promotion and release ==
Ashanti performed "The Woman You Love" live on Good Morning America on February 13, 2012, and also performed the song on April 17, 2012, as the musical guest on Jimmy Kimmel Live!. Over a year later, in June 2013, Ashanti took to the stage of Marie to perform "Never Should Have" live for the first time. "Never Should Have" along with snippets of "She Can't" and "I Got It" (featuring Future) all featured on DJ Ty Boogie's Str8 RnB pt. 6 mixtape, hosted by Ashanti. On July 30, 2013, the date BraveHeart was supposed to be released, Ashanti confirmed that the album would now be released in September 2013. Via her Instagram account she posted a new promotional picture and said, "Hey y'all! So Braveheart is NOT coming out today we have clearances & legalities to take of... It costs to be the boss!!!". The album was then slated for release in early 2014, preceded by the single "I Got It" featuring rapper Rick Ross. Originally set for a February 18 release, the album was released on March 4, 2014.

=== Singles ===
According to Ashanti's website, On March 25, 2013, a brand new song titled "Never Should Have" was released for digital download. The official music video was filmed in March 2013 by director Sanji. The song impacted US Rhythmic and Urban radio on April 29, 2013. After it was announced that the album was pushed back from July 30, 2013, Ashanti announced that two exclusive remixes, The JButtah and AllStyle Remixes of "Never Should Have" would be released and promoted to radio stations. Despite not peaking in any US chart, "Never Should Have" won Ashanti a 2013 Soul Train Music Award for Best Independent R&B/Soul Performance. The album's next single "I Got It" featuring Rick Ross, was made available for purchase via iTunes on November 26, 2013. It was sent to US urban contemporary radio stations on January 28, 2014. On February 20, 2014, Rap-Up confirmed that "First Real Love" would be the album's next music video. However, in April 2014, during an interview with Mike Wass for Idolator, Ashanti said she was going with "Early in the Morning" featuring French Montana as the album's next single after its skyrocketing performance on the US iTunes R&B Chart.

In July 2014, Ashanti announced that future official singles from Braveheart would be voted on by fans.

== Reception ==
=== Critical response ===
Professional ratings
Review scores
Source	Rating
AllMusic	4/5 stars
HipHopDX	3/5 stars
Rolling Stone	(favorable)
USA Today	2.5/4 stars

Upon its release, BraveHeart was met with generally positive from music critics. Jon Reyes of HipHopDX gave the album three out of five stars, saying "Braveheart has a few of those moments that demonstrate sonic evolution and connectedness. Though it is concise and cohesive, more than any of Ashanti's albums, it's still marred with glimpses of wanted grandiosity at the expense of artistic revelation." Andy Kellman of AllMusic gave the album four out of five stars, saying "Although it took longer to complete than Ashanti, Chapter II, and Concrete Rose combined, Braveheart doesn't sound like it. More importantly, The Declaration's lack of success – relative to those previous albums – doesn't seem to have changed Ashanti's direction one bit." At USA Today, Elysa Gardner rated the album two-and-a-half stars out of four, stating that "Ashanti defies and succumbs to romantic clichés, her piquant soprano alternately teasing and sulking, lashing out and standing firm."

=== Commercial performance ===
The album debuted at number 10 on the Billboard 200 chart, with first-week sales of 28,000 copies in the United States.

== Track listing ==
Standard edition
No.	Title	Writer(s)	Producer(s)	Length
1.	"Intro" / "Braveheart"	Ashanti Douglas; Lenton T. Hutton	L.T. Hutton; Mista Raja Greene; Yusuf "Sef Millz" Alexander; Kevin Randolph^{[a]}	5:23
2.	"Nowhere"	Douglas; Jaramye Daniels; Akil King; Kibwe Luke; Sharif "Reefa" Slater	Slater; 12Keyz; Fresh^{[b]}; Daniels^{[b]}	3:02
3.	"Runaway"	Douglas; King; JeanOlivier; James Brown; Samuel Barnes; James Smith; Daniels; Lynne Collins; Slater; Kibwe Luke	Slater; 12Keyz; Fresh^{[b]}; Daniels^{[b]}	3:10
4.	"Count"	Douglas; Noel "Detail" Fisher	DJ Clue; Detail; Drone; E-Bass	2:53
5.	"Early in the Morning" (featuring French Montana)	Douglas; Karim Kharbouch; Ernesto "DJ Clue" Shaw; Eric Johnson; Carlton Sye	DJ Clue	4:07
6.	"3 Words"	Douglas; Hutton	L.T. Hutton	3:23
7.	"Love Games" (featuring Jeremih)	Timothy Bullock		4:12
8.	"Scars"	Douglas; Hutton; Randolph	Hutton; Randolph^{[a]}	5:49
9.	"Never Should Have"	Douglas; Zafr	Zafr	3:58
10.	"She Can't"	Douglas; Zafr	Zafr	3:44
11.	"Don't Tell Me No"	Douglas; India Boodram; Kesia Hollins; Jazmyn Boodram; James Fauntleroy; Zafr	Zafr	3:49
12.	"I Got It" (featuring Rick Ross)	Douglas; Hutton; Williams Roberts II	L.T. Hutton	4:06
13.	"First Real Love" / "Outro" (featuring Beenie Man)	Douglas; Victan Edmund; Moses Davis; Dorrett Wisdom	Teetimus; Greene	4:53
Total length:				52:29

iTunes Store / Japan edition bonus tracks
No.	Title	Writer(s)	Producer(s)	Length
14.	"Perfect So Far"	Douglas; Rico Love; Pierre Medor	Love; Medor	4:52
15.	"Never Too Far Away"	Douglas; Hutton	L.T. Hutton	5:28
Total length:				62:49

Target bonus tracks
No.	Title	Writer(s)	Producer(s)	Length
14.	"Bonafide Survivor"	Douglas; Warryn Campbell	Campbell	3:50
15.	"RIP"	Douglas; Alan Cameron; Marvin D. Floyd	Cameron; Floyd	4:12
Total length:				60:33

Notes

- ^{^[a]} denotes co-producer
- ^{^[b]} denotes vocal producer
- "Runaway" features an interpolation of "Put It on the Line", written by James Brown and Gloria Lyn Collins. It also contains interpolations of "I Shot Ya", as written by Brown, Collins, Jean Claude Olivier and James Todd Smith.
- Sample and producers credits taken from album liner. Writing credits taken from Universal Music Publishing, ASCAP Repertoire or BMI Repertoire.

== Charts ==
=== Weekly charts ===
Chart (2014–15)	Peak position
UK Independent Albums (Official Charts)	40
UK R&B Albums (Official Charts)	29
US Billboard 200	10
US Top R&B/Hip-Hop Albums (Billboard)	4

=== Year-end charts ===
Chart (2014)	Position
US Top R&B/Hip-Hop Albums (Billboard)	69

== Release history ==
Country	Date	Format	Label
United States	March 4, 2014	CD; digital download; streaming	Written Entertainment; eOne Music
United Kingdom	March 4, 2014	Digital download	eOne Music
United Kingdom	March 24, 2014	CD	eOne Music
Japan	March 26, 2014	CD	Victor
United States	January 7, 2022	Vinyl	Written Entertainment; MNRK Music Group
