= The Best of Nelly =

Greatest hits album by Nelly
- Released: February 4, 2009
- Genre: Hip hop
- Length: 78:54
- Label: Universal International

Nelly chronology
6 Derrty Hits (2008)	The Best of Nelly (2009)	5.0 (2010)

The Best of Nelly is a compilation album by rapper Nelly, released in Japan on February 4, 2009.

== Track listing ==
1. "Country Grammar (Hot Shit)" – 4:47 :: Originally appears on Country Grammar (2000)
2. "Ride wit Me" (featuring City Spud) – 4:51 :: Originally appears on Country Grammar (2000)
3. "E.I." (radio edit) – 4:44 :: Originally appears on Country Grammar (2000)
4. "Hot in Herre" – 3:48 :: Originally appears on Nellyville (2002)
5. "Air Force Ones" (featuring St. Lunatics) – 5:03 :: Originally appears on Nellyville (2002)
6. "Dilemma" (featuring Kelly Rowland) – 4:48 :: Originally appears on Nellyville (2002)
7. "#1" – 3:18 :: Originally appears on Nellyville (2002)
8. "My Place" (featuring Jaheim) – 5:36 :: Originally appears on Suit (2004)
9. "Over and Over" (featuring Tim McGraw) – 4:13 :: Originally appears on Suit (2004)
10. "Tilt Ya Head Back" (featuring Christina Aguilera) – 4:13 :: Originally appears on Sweat (2004)
11. "Flap Your Wings" – 4:09 :: Originally appears on Sweat (2004)
12. "Grillz" (featuring Paul Wall) – 4:39
13. "Wadsyaname" – 4:06
14. "Party People" (featuring Fergie) – 4:02 :: Originally appears on Brass Knuckles (2008)
15. "Body on Me" (featuring Akon and Ashanti) – 3:33 :: Originally appears on Brass Knuckles (2008)
16. "One & Only" – 4:19 :: Originally appears on Brass Knuckles (2008)
17. "Dilemma" (Jermaine Dupri remix; featuring Kelly Rowland and Ali) – 4:39
18. "One & Only" (remix; featuring Double) – 4:20

== Charts ==
Chart performance for The Best of Nelly
Chart (2009)	Peak position
Japanese Albums (Oricon)	9

== Certifications ==
Certifications for The Best of Nelly
Region	Certification	Certified units/sales
United Kingdom (BPI)	Gold	100,000^{‡}
^{‡} Sales+streaming figures based on certification alone.
