= Stepped on My J'z =

Single by Nelly featuring Ciara and Jermaine Dupri

from the album Brass Knuckles
- Released: July 1, 2008
- Recorded: 2008
- Genre: Crunk; hip-hop
- Length: 5:03 (album version); 4:40 (single version)
- Label: Derrty; Universal Motown
- Songwriters: Cornell Haynes; Ciara Harris; Jermaine Mauldin; James Phillips
- Producer: Jermaine Dupri

Nelly singles chronology
"Body on Me" (2008)	"Stepped on My J'z" (2008)	"Warrior" (2008)

Ciara singles chronology
"Can't Leave 'em Alone" (2007)	"Stepped on My J'z" (2008)	"Go Girl" (2008)

Jermaine Dupri singles chronology
"Finer Things" (2008)	"Stepped on My J'z" (2008)	"Good Good" (2008)

"Stepped on My J'z" is a song by American rapper Nelly featuring American singer Ciara and American producer Jermaine Dupri; produced by the latter, it was released as the second single from Nelly's fifth studio album, Brass Knuckles.

== Song information ==
This is the second time Ciara has worked with Jermaine Dupri, the first time working on the single "Like You" with Bow Wow. The song was originally to be the official second single, but was changed to the third single due to the single "Body on Me" charting early. At the BET Awards 2008, Ashanti announced that instead of them collaborating with the same single, she went her way with a different single for her album, and Nelly finally decided to make "J'z" the official second single once again.

The song was performed on the BET Awards '08 by Nelly, Ciara and Jermaine.

== Music video ==
The music video for "Stepped on My J'z" was filmed in the middle of May 2008 and directed by Benny Boom. It then premiered on the show Access Granted on June 11 on BET. The video also peaked at #1 on BET's 106 & Park. The music video starts off with young comedian/actor Lil' JJ, actor/singer Maestro Harrell, and another friend skipping school and returning with newly bought pairs of Jordans. Nelly starts his first verse seated atop an Ariel Atom with a video girl behind, both wearing Jordans. It then cuts over to the scene where Jeffrey Scott Bailey with a careless attitude walks past with a bike and steps on Nelly's freshly bought Jordans. Nelly then immediately confronts him, with his homeboys co-signing behind him, in a scene reminiscent to that of a cut from the popular Spike Lee film, Do the Right Thing. The video then cuts to Jermaine Dupri doing his verse in his "personal shoe garage" dancing in front of a mirror and trying on different pairs of Jordans. It then quickly cuts to a black and white scene with Dupri atop a basketball goal imitating a popular commercial in which Michael Jordan continuously attempts to make free throws as Spike Lee blocks each and every shot, with Nelly portraying Michael in this scene. The video then cuts to Ciara and two other dancers pulling up to a basketball park in a blue candy-painted donk. Ciara and her dancers then cut to a sexy choreographed dance scene (which was made up literally two hours before the video was shot) as she sings her verse and shows off her turquoise Melody Ehsani "POW" 3-finger rings, Melody Ehsani "FOCUSED" plated necklace, and her pair of exclusive Jordans with a Chanel pocket purse attached to her left shoe. After her verse, Ciara dances to the words of Nelly's verse immediately following hers, throwing up the numbered Jordan signs as Nelly raps them. The video finally cuts to a collaborative scene with Nelly, Ciara, and Dupri on a basketball court with spectators cheering and dancing on the sidelines. The video ends this way with the three "artists" performing a choreographed "J'z" step, dancing around, and interacting with the fans. The St. Lunatics, Avery Storm and DJ Drama make cameo appearances in this video.

== Charts ==
Chart (2008)	Peak position
US Billboard Hot 100	90
US Bubbling Under R&B/Hip-Hop Singles (Billboard)	4
