= 6 Derrty Hits =

EP by Nelly
- Released: November 25, 2008
- Genre: Hip hop
- Length: 26:46
- Label: Universal Motown

Nelly chronology
Brass Knuckles (2008)	6 Derrty Hits (2008)	The Best of Nelly (2009)

6 Derrty Hits is an EP by rapper Nelly. It includes songs from Country Grammar, Nellyville, and Brass Knuckles and includes some of Nelly's most popular hits.

== Track listing ==
6 Derrty Hits track listing
No.	Title	Producer(s)	Length
1.	"Country Grammar"	Jason "Jay E" Epperson	4:16
2.	"Ride wit Me" (featuring City Spud)	Jason "Jay E" Epperson	4:51
3.	"Hot in Herre"	The Neptunes	3:48
4.	"Air Force Ones" (featuring St. Lunatics)	The Trackboyz	5:04
5.	"Dilemma" (featuring Kelly Rowland)	BAM & Ryan	4:49
6.	"Party People" (featuring Fergie)	Polow Da Don	3:58

== Charts ==
Chart performance for 6 Derrty Hits
Chart (2008)	Peak position
US Top R&B/Hip-Hop Albums (Billboard)	57
