= Warrior (Nelly song) =

Single by Nelly

from the album AT&T TEAM USA Soundtrack
- Released: July 29, 2008
- Recorded: 2007 – 2008
- Genre: Hip hop
- Length: 2:44
- Label: Universal Motown
- Songwriters: C. Haynes & T. Feemster

Nelly singles chronology
"Stepped on My J'z" (2008)	"Warrior" (2008)	"One & Only" (2008)

"Warrior" is a hip hop song performed by rapper Nelly. It was released on July 29, 2008 promotionally for the 2008 Summer Olympics. The song appears on the AT&T TEAM USA Soundtrack, and later included as an iTunes Store bonus tracks of Nelly's fourth studio album, Brass Knuckles.

The video of the song was released on August 18, 2008, and features scenes of American Olympians intercut with scenes of Nelly recording the song.

This song is also the theme song of George Balhan's Mohawk Warrior Monster Truck that is held in Monster Jam events until his retirement in 2016.

== Charts ==
Chart (2008)	Peak position
US Billboard Hot 100	96
