= A Wonderful Christmas with Ashanti =

EP by Ashanti
- Released: December 3, 2013
- Recorded: 2013–2014
- Genre: Christmas; R&B
- Length: 16:16 (original); 25:15 (2014 digital deluxe edition); 31:42 (Target edition)
- Label: Written Entertainment, Entertainment One

Ashanti chronology
The Vault (2009)	A Wonderful Christmas with Ashanti (2013)	Braveheart (2014)

A Wonderful Christmas with Ashanti is a holiday EP by American R&B recording artist Ashanti. Originally released digitally on December 3, 2013, as a five-song EP, the collection featured recordings from the Lifetime original movie Christmas in the City. On October 27, 2014, it was re-issued to digital platforms as a deluxe edition with three newly recorded songs. Furthermore, the album was given a CD release exclusively to Target stores in the U.S. on the same date, with an additional two exclusive songs. In a 2014 interview with Arise Entertainment 360, Ashanti revealed that her parents, sister and cousin provided backing vocals for her rendition of "White Christmas", which was recorded for the expanded 2014 re-issue of the album.

== Track listing ==
A Wonderful Christmas with Ashanti track listing
No.	Title	Producer(s)	Length
1.	"Let It Snow"	Jingle Punks	1:56
2.	"It's Christmas"	Marvin Floyd	3:56
3.	"Christmas Love"	Ron "Neff-U" Feemster	3:47
4.	"Sleigh Ride"	Jingle Punks	2:05
5.	"Christmas Is the Time" (reworked version of "Time of Year" from Ashanti's Christmas)	Floyd	4:33
Total length:			16:16

2014 digital deluxe edition
No.	Title	Producer(s)	Length
1.	"Sleigh Ride"	Jingle Punks	2:05
2.	"Christmas Love"	Ron "Neff-U" Feemster	3:47
3.	"Let It Snow"	Jingle Punks	1:56
4.	"It's Christmas"	Floyd	3:56
5.	"Give Love on Christmas Day"	Floyd	2:59
6.	"Christmas Is the Time" (reworked version of "Time of Year" from Ashanti's Christmas)	Floyd	4:33
7.	"Santa Baby"	Floyd	3:21
8.	"White Christmas" (featuring Mom, Dad, Shi Shi and Cousin Lonney)	Floyd	2:39
Total length:			25:15

Target CD edition
No.	Title	Producer(s)	Length
1.	"Sleigh Ride"	Jingle Punks	2:05
2.	"Can't Wait for Christmas"	Marvin Floyd	2:56
3.	"Christmas Love"	Ron "Neff-U" Feemster	3:47
4.	"Let It Snow"	Jingle Punks	1:56
5.	"It's Christmas"	Floyd	3:56
6.	"Give Love on Christmas Day"	Floyd	2:59
7.	"Christmas Is the Time" (reworked version of "Time of Year" from Ashanti's Christmas)	Floyd	4:33
8.	"The First Noel"	Floyd	3:32
9.	"Santa Baby"	Floyd	3:21
10.	"White Christmas" (featuring Mom, Dad, Shi Shi and Cousin Lonney)	Floyd	2:39
Total length:			31:42
