= The Vault (Ashanti album) =

Compilation album by Ashanti
- Released: February 18, 2009
- Recorded: 2001–2009
- Genre: R&B
- Length: 48:15
- Label: AJM; The Orchard
- Producer: Miguel "Migs" Baeza; Kidd Kold; Nocko; Steven White; Kenny Flav

Ashanti chronology
The Declaration (2008)	The Vault (2009)	A Wonderful Christmas with Ashanti (2013)

The Vault is a collection of 12 previously unreleased songs by R&B singer Ashanti, released in Japan on February 18, 2009, and in the US on May 19 by AJM Records and The Orchard. The songs were written during Ashanti's teenage years and some songs were used as demos for later songs, in addition the majority of the song lyrics can be found in her previously released book of poetry Reflections on Love (2002). The songs were recorded while Ashanti was still under contract to AJM and before she signed with Murder Inc. Records. Further production was added before the album's release in 2009. The collection was released without input or support from Ashanti. It was released in Japan on February 18, 2009, as the first project in the Avex Group–The Orchard alliance. According to Billboard, "Let's Do Something Crazy" featuring Flo Rida was lined up as the album's first single, followed by "Imagine Life".

== Track listing ==
1. "Imagine Life" – 3:52
2. "Don't Need You" – 3:43
3. "Let's Do Something Crazy" (featuring Flo Rida) – 4:08
4. "Pretty Little Flower" (featuring J Star) – 3:45
5. "Where I Stand" – 4:12
6. "Satisfy" – 3:42
7. "Show You" – 4:11
8. "Mrs. So So" – 3:19
9. "No Words" – 3:50
10. "Saw Your Face" – 4:02
11. "Girls in the Movies" – 3:37
12. "To the Club" – 4:21
13. "Summertime" (international bonus track) – 3:34
14. "To the Club" (Remix) (Amazon MP3 bonus track) – 3:27
15. "Gotta Get Out" (Migs Mix) (iTunes Store bonus track) – 4:13
16. "Gotta Get Out" (Japan bonus track) – 4:35
17. "To the Club" (Kidd Kold Remix) (Japan bonus track) – 3:28
18. "Let's Do Something Crazy" (DJ Komori Remix) (featuring Flo Rida) (Japan bonus track) - 4:04

== Charts ==
Chart (2009)	Peak position
Japanese Albums (Oricon)	110
