= The Declaration =

Studio album by Ashanti
- Released: June 3, 2008
- Recorded: 2007–2008
- Studios: Studio Center Recording (Miami, Florida); The Program Studios (Hollywood, California); 2nd Floor Studios (Atlantic City, New Jersey); Quad Recording Studios (New York, New York); Brandon's Way Recording Studios (Los Angeles, California); Southside Studios (Atlanta, Georgia); Record Plant (Los Angeles, California); Tiki Recording Studios (Glen Cove, New York); Realsongs Recording Studios (Los Angeles, California); Banana Boat Studios (Burbank, California)
- Genre: R&B
- Length: 49:22
- Labels: The Inc.; Universal Motown
- Producers: Ashanti Douglas; Akon; Babyface; Chad Beatz; Keith Biz; Channel 7; Jermaine Dupri; Theron "Neff-U" Feemster; L.T. Hutton; Rodney Jerkins; Manuel Seal; Peter Stengaard; Diane Warren; Mario Winans; Yinon Yahel

Ashanti chronology
Collectables by Ashanti (2005)	The Declaration (2008)	The Vault (2009)

Singles from The Declaration
- 1. "The Way That I Love You" Released: February 26, 2008; 2. "Body on Me" Released: June 10, 2008; 3. "Good Good" Released: July 16, 2008

The Declaration is the fifth studio album by American singer Ashanti. It was released by The Inc. Records and Universal Motown Records on June 3, 2008. Her first project in four years, it followed the end of The Inc.'s distribution deal with Def Jam Recordings after a three-year investigation in which label head Irv Gotti was acquitted, a process that nonetheless reshaped their professional relationship. The album marked a strategic departure for Ashanti, featuring collaborations with a new set of producers, including Babyface, Rodney Jerkins, Jermaine Dupri, L.T. Hutton, and Pharrell Williams.

The album received mixed reviews, with critics praising its subtlety and signs of artistic growth while criticizing its lack of standout hits, originality, and strong personality. Commercially, it debuted at number six on the US Billboard 200 with significantly lower sales than her previous albums, marking a noticeable decline in momentum. Three singles were released in support of the album, including lead single "The Way That I Love You," which reached number two on the US Hot R&B/Hip-Hop Songs chart. The Declaration would mark her final album to be released on Gotti's label.

== Background ==
In December 2004, Ashanti released her fourth studio album Concrete Rose through The Inc. Records. The album debuted at number seven on the US Billboard 200 with 254,000 first-week sales but performed less strongly internationally, peaking in the top 20 in Japan and top 30 in the United Kingdom. Critics gave it mixed reviews, often calling it unoriginal. Despite this, it earned platinum certification in the US and gold in Japan and the UK, with its lead single, "Only U" reaching the top 20 in several countries. However, the album's promotion was soon hindered by legal issues involving The Inc. and label head Irv Gotti, who was arrested shortly after the release. As a result, Def Jam, The Inc.'s parent label, required the company to fulfill its existing contractual obligations with Ashanti and other artists by issuing compilation projects. Afterward, Def Jam chose not to renew those contracts, leading to the release of the remix compilation album Collectables by Ashanti in December 2005, which marked her final release under the label.

With Murder Inc. spending 2005 and part of 2006 searching for distribution before eventually signing with Universal Motown in August 2006, Ashanti turned her focus to other pursuits and began building her acting career. During this period, she appeared in several films, including the biographical sports drama Coach Carter (2005), the made-for-television film The Muppets' Wizard of Oz (2005), the teen comedy John Tucker Must Die (2006) and the action horor film Resident Evil: Extinction (2007). Intent on distancing herself from Irv Gotti, she sought out a new circle of collaborators for her next album, including Robin Thicke, Jermaine Dupri, L.T. Hutton, and Pharrell Williams, while minimizing the involvement of The Inc.'s in-house team. Titled The Declaration, she conceived the project as a long-overdue but necessary shift, centered on themes of womanhood, growth, and empowerment. She later revealed that she recorded fifty-two tracks for the album, of which fifteen were ultimately selected.

== Singles ==
- "The Way That I Love You" was referred to as the real "first single" in press material and media reports. It was released in February 2008 to Urban radio. It was released to digital retailers in March 2008 and to Rhythmic radio in April 2008. It reached number two on the Hot R&B/Hip-Hop Songs chart and number thirty-seven on the Billboard Hot 100, becoming Ashanti's first song to reach the top forty since "Only U" in 2004.
- "Good Good" was released to urban radio stations on July 16, 2008. The song contains elements of Elton John's 1974 single "Bennie and the Jets", and has the same melody arrangement as Michael Jackson's "The Girl Is Mine".

=== Other Songs ===
- In mid-2007, MTV News reported that the first single from The Declaration was "Switch", which was produced by Shy Carter and released digitally in the United States on July 24, 2007. It was later reported that "Switch" will not be included on the album's track listing, and that the first single would be "Hey Baby (After the Club)".
- "Hey Baby (After the Club)", featuring Mario Winans, initially replaced "Switch" as the album's lead single. It samples Prince and The Revolution's 1984 single "Erotic City"; music reviewers criticized this decision as Sean Combs had already used this sample earlier that year for "Last Night". The song peaked at number eighty-seven on the Billboard Hot R&B/Hip-Hop Songs chart. "Hey Baby (After the Club)" was later replaced by "The Way That I Love You" as The Declaration's official lead single; it was not included on the US editions of the album, but was a bonus track for international releases.
- "Body On Me" was recorded not only for Ashanti's The Declaration, but also for Nelly's fifth studio album Brass Knuckles. The track is produced by Akon and Giorgio Tuinfort. It went to number one on Billboard's Hot Videoclip Tracks chart in its first week, becoming the first number one single from Nelly's album.

== Critical reception ==
Professional ratings
Aggregate scores
Source	Rating
Metacritic	52/100
Review scores
Source	Rating
AllMusic	3/5 stars
Daily News	3/5 stars
Entertainment Weekly	C+
Newsday	B
Now	2/5 stars
Rolling Stone	2/5 stars
Slant Magazine	2.5/5 stars
Toronto Star	2/4 stars
USA Today	3/4 stars
Vibe	2.5/5 stars

The Declaration received generally mixed reviews from music critics. At Metacritic, which assigns a normalized rating out of 100 to reviews from mainstream critics, the album received an average score of 52, based on 11 reviews, indicating "mixed or average" reviews. Dan Gennoe of Yahoo! Music UK felt that the album was "surprisingly short of anything even approaching a commercial hit [but] even without instant hooks to grab on to, it's amazingly compelling." He called The Declaration a "supremely subtle and sophisticated record" as well as "the best album of Ashanti's career." Sal Cinquemani from Slant Magazine felt that while "past releases have displayed an ostensible desire to follow in the melodramatic steps of Mary J. Blige and much of Declaration continues in that quest," it also "aims to prove that Ashanti is indeed growing up."

AllMusic editor Andy Kellman found that "even though this album marks a nearly complete break from The Inc., it's very much in line with what came before it, hardly a major departure [...] This is neither a great nor a poor Ashanti album. It's decent, just like the rest of them." Leah Greenblatt from Entertainment Weekly wrote that The Declaration "simply doesn't make much of a statement, and its high point – the prettily emotive ballad "The Way That I Love You" – isn't enough to unseat the Beyoncés and Mary J.'s of the world." Rolling Stone's Christian Hoard thought that Ashanti "is still doing the diva-by-numbers thing, alternating between angry-at-her-man anthems and lovey pleasantry [...] But even with A-list producers like Babyface, Jermaine Dupri and Rodney Jerkins, the beats stick to straightforward bounce or subdued ballads. And Ashanti doesn't offer any more personality."

Shanel Odum of Vibe gave a mixed review to the album, writing that "her voice is pleasant if sometimes uninspiring, but on soulful songs like "You’re Gonna Miss," the pain in her sweet-as-Smarties voice is definite. But even with all the emo-passion, nearly half of this album is lukewarm." Now writer Benjamin Boles found that it's "all too evident why The Declaration was delayed. Producer LT Hutton is behind most of these beats, and it’s easy to see why he hasn’t had a hit in years. A few bigger names drop in (Nelly and Akon might as well be sleepwalking here), but none sound like they’re putting much into their appearances. Ashanti’s still got a decent voice, but she’s badly in need of a better songwriting and production team." The Boston Globe remarked that "after four years away, Ashanti declares that she's back, but this middling, familiar set of songs is unlikely to reclaim her spotlight."

== Commercial performance ==
The Declaration debuted and peaked at number six on the US Billboard 200, selling 86,000 copies in its first week of release. It marked Ashanti's lowest opening sales for a regular studio album to then and was a considerable decline from her previous effort Concrete Rose, which had opened to sales of 254,000 units in 2004. On the Top R&B/Hip Hop Albums chart the album debuted at number two where it spent a total of 34 consecutive weeks on the chart. By October 2008, The Declaration had sold 246,000 copies.

== Track listing ==
The Declaration track listing
No.	Title	Writer(s)	Producer(s)	Length
1.	"Intro"	Seven Aurelius	Channel 7	1:05
2.	"The Way That I Love You"	Ashanti Douglas; L.T. Hutton	Hutton; Douglas	4:27
3.	"You're Gonna Miss"	Douglas; Hutton	Hutton; Douglas	3:14
4.	"So Over You"	Douglas; Rodney Jerkins	Jerkins	3:59
5.	"Struggle"	Douglas; Hutton	Hutton	4:34
6.	"Girlfriend"	Douglas; Hutton	Hutton	3:30
7.	"Things You Make Me Do" (featuring Robin Thicke)	Douglas; Thicke; Aurelius; Frenchie Vein; Chad Beatz; Keith Biz	Channel 7; Beats^{[a]}; Keith Biz^{[a]}	4:28
8.	"In These Streets"	Douglas; Theron Feemster	Neff-U	4:24
9.	"Good Good"	Douglas; Jermaine Dupri; Manuel Seal	Dupri; Seal^{[a]}	3:36
10.	"Body on Me" (featuring Nelly & Akon)	Douglas; Cornell Haynes; Aliaume Thiam	Akon	3:20
11.	"Mother"	Douglas; Kenneth Edmonds	Babyface	5:10
12.	"Shine"	Douglas; Diane Warren	Peter Stengaard; Warren^{[b]}	3:40
13.	"The Declaration"	Douglas; Aurelius; Yinon Yahel	Channel 7; Yahel	3:55
Total length:				49:22

United States iTunes Store and international digital bonus track
No.	Title	Writer(s)	Producer(s)	Length
14.	"Why"	Douglas; Jim Beanz	Beanz	4:32
Total length:				53:54

United Kingdom bonus track
No.	Title	Writer(s)	Producer(s)	Length
14.	"Hey Baby (After the Club)" (featuring Mario Winans)	Douglas; Aurelius; Winans	Aurelius; Winans	4:30
Total length:				53:52

Notes

- ^{^[a]} denotes Co-Producer
- ^{^[b]} denotes Additional Producer

== Credits and personnel ==
Credits are taken from the album's liner notes.

- Seven Aurelius – producer, vocals (background)
- Chad Beat – producer, programming, vocals (background)
- Keith Bizz – producer, programming
- Paul Boutin – engineer, mixing
- Sandy Brummels – art direction, creative director
- Channel 7 – engineer, Instrumentation, producer, vocals (background)
- Mike Donaldson – engineer
- Jermaine Dupri – producer
- Kenneth Edmonds – composer, drums, guitar, keyboards, producer
- Theron Feemster – producer
- Mark "Exit" Goodchild – engineer
- John Horesco IV – engineer
- Bob Horn – engineer
- L.T. Hutton – composer
- Rodney "Darkchild" Jerkins – producer
- Khris Kellow – keyboards
- Christopher Kornmann – art direction, design
- Sam Lobue II – engineer
- Mario Lucy – engineer
- John Marie – mixing
- Nelly – primary artist
- Eddy C. Richardson – a&R
- Andros Rodriguez – engineer
- Matthew Rolston – photography
- Gillian Russell – A&R
- Manuel Seal, Jr. – producer
- Peter Stengaard – engineer, instruments, producer, programming
- Aliaume Thiam – Instrumentation, producer, programming
- Diane Warren – executive producer (track 12)
- James M. Wisner – engineer
- Legal [Legal Representation For Ashanti] – Stephan Dweck, William Archer
- Legal [Legal Representation For Universal Music Group] – Jerry Juste, Michael Reinert
- Management [Business Management For Ashanti] – Jerome Leventhal
- Management [Personal Management For Ashanti] – Momanger, Tina Y. Douglas
- Marketing [Marketing For Universal Music Group] – Shanti Das
- Photography By – Matthew Rolston

== Charts ==
=== Weekly charts ===
Chart (2008)	Peak position
Japanese Albums (Oricon)	26
UK Albums (Official Charts)	119
UK R&B Albums (Official Charts)	7
US Billboard 200	6
US Top R&B/Hip-Hop Albums (Billboard)	2

=== Year-end charts ===
Chart (2008)	Position
US Billboard 200	169
US Top R&B/Hip-Hop Albums (Billboard)	45

== Release history ==
List of release dates, showing region, formats, label, and reference
Region	Date	Format(s)	Label	Ref
United States	June 3, 2008	CD; digital download	The Inc.; Universal Motown	
United Kingdom	June 9, 2008	CD; digital download	The Inc.; Universal Motown	
Brazil	July 18, 2008	CD; digital download	The Inc.; Universal Motown	
