= Wadsyaname =

Single by Nelly

from the album Brass Knuckles (Japanese bonus track)
- Released: August 21, 2007
- Recorded: 2007
- Genre: Hip hop, R&B
- Length: 4:08
- Label: Derrty, Universal Motown
- Songwriter: Cornell Haynes, Jr.
- Producer: Neff-U

Nelly singles chronology
"Call on Me" (2006)	"Wadsyaname" (2007)	"5000 Ones" (2007)

"Wadsyaname" is a song by American rapper Nelly, released to the iTunes Store on August 22, 2007. It was supposed to be the first official single from his fifth studio album Brass Knuckles (2008), but Nelly later confirmed that the single will not make the album (however it is a bonus track featured as #16 on the UK and Japanese edition of Brass Knuckles). It was replaced by "Party People". It is produced by Neff-U, and sampled the piano line from "All My Life" by K-Ci & JoJo. Nelly performed the single along with "Let It Go" at the 2007 BET Hip Hop Awards.

== Music video ==
The music video was directed by Chris Robinson.

== Charts ==
Chart (2007–2008)	Peak position
New Zealand (Recorded Music NZ)	4
Slovakia Airplay (ČNS IFPI)	90
US Billboard Hot 100	43
US Hot R&B/Hip-Hop Songs (Billboard)	31
US Hot Rap Songs (Billboard)	13
US Pop 100 (Billboard)	46
US Rhythmic Airplay (Billboard)	13

== Certifications ==
Region	Certification	Certified units/sales
New Zealand (RMNZ)	Gold	7,500^{*}
^{*} Sales figures based on certification alone.
