= Say Less (Ashanti song) =

Single by Ashanti featuring Ty Dolla $ign
- Released: November 6, 2017
- Studio: Tyrese Gibson's studio (Miami, FL)
- Genre: West Coast hip hop; R&B; club
- Length: 3:14
- Label: Written Entertainment
- Songwriters: Ashanti; Ty Dolla $ign
- Producer: DJ Mustard

Ashanti singles chronology
"Let's Go" (2015)	"Say Less" (2017)	"Encore" (2018)

Ty Dolla $ign singles chronology
"Leg Over (Remix)" (2017)	"Say Less" (2017)	"Ex" (2017)

"Say Less" is a song recorded by American singer Ashanti that features fellow American singer Ty Dolla $ign. It was released on November 6, 2017. Media outlets reported that it was the lead single from Ashanti's upcoming sixth album. The single was produced by DJ Mustard and was written by two said artists. It is an R&B, club, and West Coast hip hop song whose lyrics are about someone telling critics to mind their own businesses; Ashanti and Ty Dolla $ign also flirt with one another on the track.

"Say Less" was praised by critics following its release; its vocals were frequently cited as the highlights, though commentators were divided over the production. The song was used in a commercial for Cîroc vodka, and Ashanti further promoted it with live performances. A music video was released on April 6, 2018, on Ashanti's Vevo account. In the video, Ashanti confronts rumors around her career and experiences media scrutiny.

== Recording and release ==
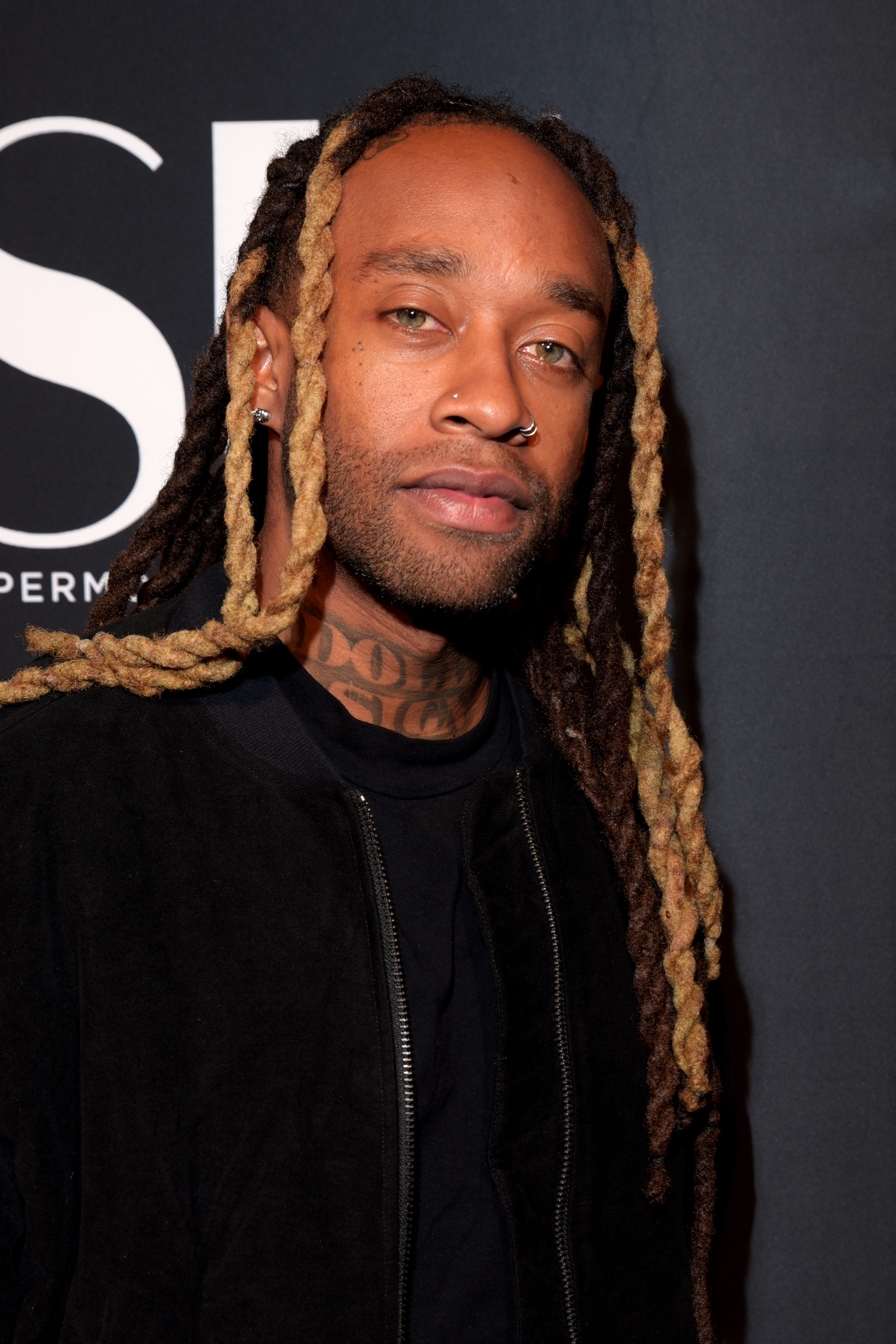
Ty Dolla Sign features on the single.

Ashanti wrote "Say Less" with Ty Dolla $ign while working with him in a recording studio; the song was produced by DJ Mustard. Ty Dolla $ign provided collaborative verses for the song. Ty Dolla $ign and Ashanti had agreed to work together after talking on a group text started by Ashanti's brother; they first met in Los Angeles. Ashanti said she thought his melody and cadence fit her music. "Say Less" was recorded in Tyrese Gibson's recording studio in Miami and was mixed in Atlanta.

"Say Less" was made available through her record label Written Entertainment. Media outlets reported that it was the lead single from Ashanti's upcoming sixth album, and referred to it as her comeback single. In a Billboard interview, Ashanti said that she considered releasing one or two other songs from her upcoming album instead of "Say Less". She picked it as a single since it was featured in an advertisement for Cîroc vodka.

The song was released on November 6, 2017, as a digital download. Ashanti first announced it during a conversation with a TMZ cameraman. Clean and explicit versions of the song were made available. The cover art shows Ashanti naked and covered only with an oversized checkered purse. The day following its release, the track was uploaded to WorldStarHipHop's YouTube account.

== Composition and lyrics ==
"Say Less"
An audio sample of the song. Music critics identified it as a R&B, club, and West Coast hip hop composition.

"Say Less" is an R&B, club and West Coast hip hop song, that lasts three minutes and 14 seconds. Carl Lamarre of Billboard wrote that the composition featured Mustard's "signature flavor", while Trevor Smith of HotNewHipHop identified it as having a West-Coast hip hop sound. Glenn Gamboa of Newsweek described it as an R&B take on Demi Lovato's pop music. Brooke Marine of W wrote that "Say Less" is an example of the album's "slew of fun party bops that fit in with Ashanti's idea of empowerment". Several music critics called the track "bouncy".

The song revolves around Ashanti telling critics to stay out of her business, and lyrics include "bitch, say less". Ashanti said about the song's lyrics: "I think nowadays we have to make it very clear that if it's B.S., say less, I'm a New Yorker. It's a very New York term. And I think it's just about being bold and getting to the point. I don't have time for you to waste it." During the song, Ashanti and Ty Dolla $ign flirt with one another. In the single edit, she sings: "This is your body/ Ain't no way I could hide it/ I wanna be your top supplier/ Cause I'll provide this all to you". She also talks about acting like a boss: "If it ain't about the money, say less". Ty Dolla $ign boasts about his wealth in the verses: "Young n---a got the pool with me / Make it rain, got a budget on me". He brags about stealing a man's girlfriend by rapping: "Pull up to the party / Jewels all on my body / Your chick on my body / And they can't tell me nothin'".

== Critical reception ==
"Say Less" received primarily positive reviews from music critics. Praising the song's composition and Mustard's production as "catchy", Carl Lamarre wrote "Ashanti's dulcet vocals are sweeter than ever". Emmanuel C.M. of XXL called it "a fun club record", and Claire Valentine of Paper praised Ashanti's confidence. Sydney Gore of MTV said the single "will definitely spark the fire of your desire this winter". A reviewer from Rap-Up praised Mustard's production and Ashanti's vocals, and referred to Ty Dolla $ign's contributions as "soothing vocals". Trevor Smith described Ty Dolla $ign and Mustard as "a proven hitmaking team", and wrote that they acted as "a strong support section" for Ashanti.

Other critics responded negatively to the song's composition. D-Money of SoulBounce.com praised "Say Less" as "the kind of frothy, club-ready R&B aimed straight for the mainstream", but criticized it for lacking "substance, memorability or staying power". Tom Breihan of Stereogum was more critical of the single, writing that it was stuck in "the hot sound of four years ago" and does not sound like an Ashanti song.

== Music video and promotion ==
=== Promotion and live performances ===
On November 21, 2017, "Say Less" was featured in a 20-second advertisement for Cîroc vodka, in which Ashanti wears a bikini. She promoted the commercial with images posted to her Instagram account. Sean Combs had asked Ashanti to appear in the commercial during a meeting at a Las Vegas party. During the filming, Combs told her to create a "Bo Derek moment" for the video. According to Glenn Gamboa, Ashanti collaborated with Cîroc "to empower women by offering her keys to a successful career". Ashanti explained: "I think I always try to just give the message of being an empowered woman and being able to empower women". When discussing the wardrobe for the video, she said: "Women should just be proud without having to feel any pressure."

Ashanti performed "Say Less" as part of a co-headlining concert tour with Ja Rule. Victor D. Infante of Telegram & Gazette wrote that she "delivered with equal measures sass and style". She sang the track at Billboard Live as part of medley with her previous songs; Bryan Kess of Billboard included it in his list of the top 20 Billboard Live performances of 2017. Ashanti also appeared on Genius' YouTube channel to explain the song's meaning and lyrics. On May 21, 2018, she performed "Say Less" on Good Day L.A..

=== Music video ===
In a 2017 interview with Billboard, Ashanti said a music video for the single was planned, and a preview clip was scheduled to be shown on Total Request Live. The video, directed by Noyz and LT Hutton, was released on April 6, 2018 on Ashanti's Vevo account. Throughout the video, Ashanti is confronted by media scrutiny, and Ty Dolla $ign makes minor appearances in several scenes. Abby Jones of Billboard described the video as including "theatrical elements".

In the opening scene, Ashanti narrates: "Sometimes I feel like, 'Is it really all worth it, for people to attack you and judge you, without even knowing what kind of pain and suffering you might be going through behind closed doors?'". In the video, Ashanti reflects on her life while a television presenter discusses previous scandals involving her career. The reports include her interview with Joe Budden about a fan throwing money at her during a live performance, the indictment of Murder, Inc., and allegations of a hit and run. Ashanti also watches television host Wendy Williams on her daytime talk show and looks at gossip websites. According to the media, Ashanti pushed a fan into a pool; this is later proven untrue because the fan had accidentally fallen into the water. Ashanti responds to the media by saying: "Honestly, people need to just say less." The video ends with "to be continued".

== Track listing ==
Digital download
No.	Title	Length
1.	"Say Less"	3:14

== Credits and personnel ==
- Production – DJ Mustard
- Songwriting – Ashanti, Ty Dolla $ign

== Release history ==
Region	Date	Format	Label	Ref
Worldwide	November 6, 2017	Digital download	Written Entertainment	
