= The Woman You Love =

Single by Ashanti featuring Busta Rhymes
- Released: December 13, 2011
- Recorded: 2011
- Genre: R&B
- Length: 3:15
- Label: Written; eOne
- Songwriter(s): Arden Altino; Eric Bellinger; Peter Brown; John Bruce; Ashanti Douglas; Jerry Duplessis; Shama Joseph; Trevor Smith; Alozono Stevenson
- Producer(s): Jerry Wonda; Sak Pase; Arden "Keys" Altino; Alonzo Stevenson

Ashanti singles chronology
| "Want It, Need It" (2009) | "The Woman You Love" (2011) | "Never Should Have" (2013) |

"The Woman You Love" is a song recorded by American recording artist Ashanti and Brooklyn native rapper Busta Rhymes. It was written by Arden "Keys" Altino, Eric Bellinger, Peter Brown, John Bruce, Ashanti, "Jerry Wonder" Duplessis, Shama "Sak Pase" Joseph, Rhymes and Alozono Stevenson while Sak Pase, Jerry Wonder and Arden "Keys" Altino produced the song. "The Woman You Love" samples elements of Cream's 1968 single "White Room", written by Bruce and Brown.

== Background ==
"The Woman You Love" is notable for being Ashanti's first independent release on her own record label, Written Entertainment. Whilst discussing the move, Ashanti said, "I’m so excited to have my own record label, Written Entertainment. With eOne as my distributor, I feel that their innovative and ambitious approach to the music industry, really gives my label a worldwide presence". Elaborating further, she also said, "they have the top radio people in the business and are hungry to win! The more I learned the business the more I knew this is what I wanted. Ownership is so important. As a business woman this was a great move for me!" "The Woman You Love" samples elements of Cream's 1968 single "White Room", written by Peter Brown and John Bruce.

== Composition ==
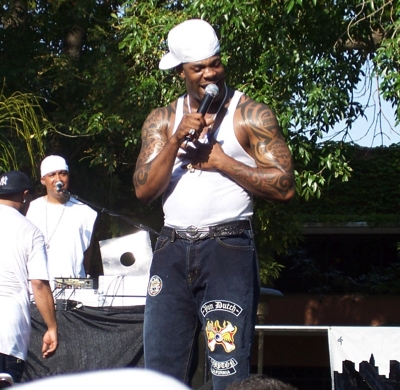
"The Woman You Love" features rapper Busta Rhymes (pictured)

MTV writer, William E. Ketchum III, wrote "the song features a pulsating backdrop, and Ashanti singing about a love interest who wasted her time, despite her trying her best to make him happy" while "[Busta Rhymes] caps off the song by admitting the man’s guilt and asking for her back, before insisting that he’s gone for good if he leaves". Likewise, Trent Fitzgerald of PopCrush described "The Woman You Love" as featuring "a thumping beat and a grooving bass line" with lyrics "about a failed relationship with no reconciliation in sight" and a "cameo" appearance by rapper Busta Rhymes who stars "as the apologetic beau looking for a second chance with ‘Shanti." The Prophet Blog wrote that Busta Rhymes adds "some serious street cred to the song that sounds closer to the hood than the radio" before describing the song as being "definitely targeted towards the R&B/Hip-Hop crowd" and thus "should please Ashanti stans and urban listeners alike" but also wrote, "it may be a little too edgy to crossover like the diva’s past records have."

== Critical reception ==
"The Woman You Love" received general acclaim from critics. Trent Fitzgerald of Popcrush wrote "This song is a great start for Ashanti" and expressed great interest in "what she is going to bring in 2012 now that she is an independent woman". The Prophet Blog published that "for her first indie release, Ashanti’s taking it back to basics", writing that the song "harks back to the hard-edged hip-hop of the 90s" and "during a time when most rappers are lining up to collaborate with David Guetta and RedOne, that’s incredibly refreshing".

== Music video ==
On January 28, 2012, Ashanti began shooting the video for the single proving it to be sci-fi themed. The video features actor/model Marcus Patrick to serve as her leading man in the clip. The video premiered on BET's 106 & Park on March 13, 2012, and peaked at number 5 on April 23, 2012.

== Synopsis ==
The video opens with the camera zooming into the galaxy. The words appear as the camera zooms into a spaceship below the title of the album: As a tortured soul floats into the future, the only way to heal is to accept and let go of the past. The song begins as we see Ashanti dressed like a space queen floating into zero gravity before landing on her feet singing the song. During the video, we look at her spending time with Patrick through a red projected screen before they have a fall-out because of Patrick cheating on Ashanti with another girl. We then see Busta Rhymes rapping as scenes of his face on a blue projected screen in the galaxy are shown as well as extra scenes of Patrick and his new flame making love with each other and Ashanti realizing that she is pregnant. Towards the end of the video we see Ashanti walking up to Patrick (now shirtless) as he tries to reconcile with her before giving them one final kiss as the camera pans out from the spaceship revealing her name and the album title once more.

== Live performances ==
Ashanti performed the song live on "Good Morning America" on February 13, 2012. Ashanti appeared as the musical guest and performed the song on Jimmy Kimmel Live! on April 17, 2012. Ashanti performed "The Woman You Love" on Live With Kelly on April 25, 2012.

== Chart performance ==
"The Woman You Love" debuted at number ninety-seven on the Billboard Hot R&B/Hip-Hop Songs chart for the week of January 7, 2012. Three weeks later the song re-entered at number ninety-five for the week of January 28, 2012.

== Track listing ==
Digital download

1. "The Woman You Love" – 3:15

== Charts ==
| Chart (2012) | Peak position |
|---|---|
| Canada Urban Airplay (Nielsen BDS) | 35 |
| South Korea International (Gaon Chart) | 49 |
| US Hot R&B/Hip-Hop Songs (Billboard) | 59 |

== Release history ==
| Region | Date | Format | Label |
|---|---|---|---|
| United Kingdom | December 13, 2011 | Digital download | E1 Universal |
| United States | December 15, 2011 | Digital download | Written, E1 Music |
| United States | January 24, 2012 | Urban contemporary airplay | Written, E1 Music |
