= The Way That I Love You =

2008 single by Ashanti

Single by Ashanti

from the album The Declaration
- Released: February 26, 2008
- Studio: Program Studios (Hollywood, CA)
- Genre: R&B
- Length: 4:30
- Label: Universal; The Inc.
- Songwriters: Ashanti Douglas; L.T. Hutton
- Producers: Ashanti Douglas; L.T. Hutton

Ashanti singles chronology
"Put a Little Umph in It" (2007)	"The Way That I Love You" (2008)	"Body on Me" (2008)

"The Way That I Love You" is a song recorded by American singer-songwriter Ashanti from her fourth studio album, The Declaration (2008). It was released as the album's lead single on February 26, 2008, through Universal and The Inc. Ashanti wrote and produced the song with L.T. Hutton. Backed by piano, guitar, and horns, "The Way That I Love You" is a midtempo R&B ballad whose lyrics tell of betrayal.

Critical response was primarily positive; some reviewers said it was a highlight from The Declaration while others felt it was inferior to music released by Beyoncé and Mary J. Blige. Commercially, the song peaked at number 37 on the Billboard Hot 100 chart and appeared on the publication's Hot R&B/Hip-Hop Songs and Adult R&B Songs component charts. Ashanti performed "The Way That I Love You" at Sessions@AOL and on tour.

Kevin Bray directed the music video which tells the story of Ashanti and her boyfriend—he cheats on her, she discovers it, and she murders him. The story for the video was inspired by the true crime TV shows Snapped and Forensic Files. The video's emphasis on violence attracted critical attention. As part of the song's promotion, Ashanti launched a website that allowed users to create and send a personalized news report and death threat to a contact. The campaign was received negatively and incited a protest in Los Angeles. The website was ultimately taken down.

== Background and release ==
For her fourth studio album The Declaration (2008), Ashanti collaborated with songwriters and producers outside of her record label Murder Inc. Her previous album Concrete Rose (2004) had been overshadowed by negative news regarding the label, including a feud with G-Unit and an FBI investigation. L.T. Hutton produced a majority of The Declaration, instead of Ashanti's longtime producer Irv Gotti. Ashanti said that she had more artistic freedom with the album. Hutton and Ashanti wrote and produced "The Way That I Love". Ashanti said that she "just started jotting down words, and it just kind of poured out" upon hearing the opening instrumental. She produced the lead and background vocals, and Hutton programmed the song and played the instruments. The final version was mixed at Brandons Way Recording Studios in Los Angeles, California.

"Switch", which featured Nelly, and "Hey Baby (After the Club)" were both announced as the album's lead single in 2007. They were replaced by "The Way That I Love You", which was released to urban radio on February 26, 2008, and rhythmic radio on April 1, 2008. It was the number one most-added song on urban radio in the week of its release. The single was included on a July 2008 Cartier charity playlist created to support the Boys & Girls Clubs of America organization.

== Composition and lyrics ==
"The Way That I Love You"
Performed with a "moderate hip-hop" tempo, the song features a "descending piano arpeggio and horn arrangement".

"The Way That I Love You" is a midtempo R&B ballad that lasts four minutes and thirty seconds. It is composed in the key of E minor using common time and a "moderate hip-hop" tempo. The instrumentation is provided by a piano, a guitar, and horns; Sal Cinquemani of Slant Magazine wrote that the single is "driven by a distinct descending piano arpeggio and horn arrangement". The song samples Hungarian Sonata by Richard Clayderman.

Ashanti's vocal range spans from the low note of D_{4} to the high note of E_{5}. AllMusic's Andy Kellman compared her vocals to her 2003 single "Rain on Me" because of their similar "melodramatic flourishes" but said the lyrics of "The Way That I Love You" were "much more vengeful in nature than depressive." Ashanti felt both men and women would relate to the single's theme of betrayal.

== Reception ==
"The Way That I Love You" was praised by critics who identified it as a highlight of The Declaration. The New York Daily News' Jim Farber felt Ashanti's collaboration with Hutton was her best work, and described "The Way That I Love You" as a "strut of a song." Noah Berlatsky of the Chicago Reader noted the song's piano loop as one of the few standouts from the album. A Dayton Daily News reviewer summed up the single as "cliche but effective."

On the other hand, some commentators negatively compared "The Way That I Love You" to music released by other singers. Despite praising Ashanti's performance as emotional, Leah Greenblatt of Entertainment Weekly found the single to be inferior to those by Beyoncé and Mary J. Blige. Vibe's Shanel Odum dismissed the song as "barely set[ting] off a smoke detector, let alone ring[ing] any alarms", in a reference to Beyoncé's 2006 single "Ring the Alarm".

Commercially, "The Way That I Love You" peaked at number 37 on the Billboard Hot 100 chart on May 17, 2008, and remained on the chart for 18 weeks. It reached number two on the Hot R&B/Hip-Hop Songs and R&B/Hip-Hop Airplay chart, and number 18 on the Adult R&B Songs component charts compiled by the same publication.

== Music video ==
Ashanti debuted the Kevin Bray-directed music video on 106 & Park and it was played on BET, MTV Hits, and MTV Jams. It was uploaded on Ashanti's YouTube account on December 22, 2009. A rough cut had leaked a few weeks before its premiere in February 2008. Another version of the video, with the subtitle "Access Denied", was released on Ashanti's YouTube account on November 22, 2009. Ashanti used the true crime TV shows Snapped and Forensic Files as the primary inspiration for the video. She felt that the storyline of a woman driven to murder fit the single's dramatic, painful, and emotional lyrics. She said that she wanted the video to be "very cinematic as opposed to a regular music video" to make a larger impact after her absence from the music industry. When discussing the overall message, Ashanti said: "Don't cheat."

Throughout the video, Ashanti is shown in a volatile relationship with her boyfriend, played by actor Christian Keyes. After learning about his infidelity, the singer poses with a butcher's knife while dressed in an evening gown. Images of evidence, including a bloody knife, footprints, and walls, intercut the video. It ends when Ashanti leaves her partner after killing him in a bathtub.

The video received critical attention for its representation of violence. In a 2015 article for The Atlantic, Kornhaber said it was part of a trend in music videos of violent female pop artists who want to avoid being presented as the victim. A The Boombox contributor summarized the video as "Hell hath no fury like a woman scorned." The music video was popular on MTV.com and Total Request Live where it peaked at number one and two, respectively.

== Promotion ==
=== Promotional campaign ===
TheWayThatILoveYou.com (pictured) and its gotcha-gram campaign received criticism for its violent content.

A publicity stunt was coordinated with the music video's release through Ashanti's website (TheWayThatILoveYou.com). The website allowed a user to create and send a personalized news report and a death threat to a contact. The message, stylized as a "gotcha-gram", featured a news report about a series of murders inspired by "The Way That I Love You" music video and the upcoming release of The Declaration. The message could be customized to include the victim's name and crime, the murder weapon, and the sender's name and home state. The choices for crimes were sleeping around, suspected sleeping around, playing you like a fool, and breaking your heart. The weapons included a boot, knife, can, sledgehammer, rolling pin, and a guillotine. The news report ends with the disclaimer, "Ashanti and Universal Music Group do not encourage or condone violence of any kind. This is for parody purposes only." Each message was attributed to the fictional Universal Crime Network. An example of a gotcha-gram, sent to CNN's Lola Ogunnaike, was: "Do you know the person pictured in the following video. If so, please contact me immediately. Your life might be in danger."

The campaign received a primarily negative response. The civil rights organization Project Islamic Hope and the think tank Industry Ears led a protest that called for the website's removal. These groups felt that the project encouraged violence as a valid means to handle disputes. Ogunnaike deemed the messages "disturbing", and felt that they damaged Ashanti's public image as a "good girl". Universal closed the site, but Ashanti defended it as "a better alternative to actual violence" and "an incredible online viral tool." Ashanti's publicist, Michelle Huff, clarified that the video was intended to have a similar tone to a Saturday Night Live sketch and said that the singer had received primarily positive feedback for the site. Shanti Das, Motown's vice president for urban marketing, referred to the campaign as a parody of the music video and said that Ashanti does not promote violence against women.

=== Live performances ===
Ashanti promoted "The Way That I Love You" with a live performance at a 2008 Sessions@AOL. In 2016, she sang it as part of the Natural Born Hitters Tour with rapper Ja Rule. The Boombox's Liz Ramanand said the performance was a highlight from the show. Ashanti subsequently included the song on the setlist for a 2018 tour with Ja Rule. Victor D. Infante of Telegram & Gazette praised her for providing a "soulful rendition" of the single and her decision to provide "an air of vulnerability" by singing it without backup dancers.

== Track listing ==
Digital download
No.	Title	Length
1.	"The Way That I Love You"	4:30
2.	"The Way That I Love You" (video)	4:25

== Credits and personnel ==
Credits adapted from the liner notes of The Declaration:

- Arranged by (all lead and background vocals), backing vocals, lead vocals, lyrics by (all), producer (all lead and background vocals) – Ashanti Douglas
- Instruments (all), programmed by – L.T. Hutton
- Producer, written by – Ashanti Douglas, L.T. Hutton

== Charts ==
=== Weekly charts ===
Chart (2008)	Peak position
Australia (ARIA)	96
Japan (Japan Hot 100)	96
US Billboard Hot 100	37
US Hot R&B/Hip-Hop Songs (Billboard)	2
US Rhythmic Airplay (Billboard)	23

=== Year-end charts ===
Chart (2008)	Position
US Hot R&B/Hip-Hop Songs (Billboard)	37

== Release history ==
Region	Format	Date	Label
United States	Urban contemporary radio	February 26, 2008	Universal; The Inc.
United States	Rhythmic contemporary radio	April 1, 2008	Universal; The Inc.
