= Good Good (Ashanti song) =

Single by Ashanti

from the album The Declaration
- Released: 2008
- Studio: Southside Studios (Atlanta, Georgia); Record Plant (Los Angeles, California)
- Length: 3:36
- Label: The Inc.; Universal; Written Entertainment
- Songwriters: Ashanti Douglas; Jermaine Dupri; Manuel Seal
- Producers: Jermaine Dupri; Manuel Seal

Ashanti singles chronology
"Body on Me" (2008)	"Good Good" (2008)	"Want It, Need It" (2009)

"Good Good" is a song by American singer Ashanti from her fourth studio album The Declaration (2008), which was released as the album's second single. Jermaine Dupri and Manuel Seal produced the song and wrote it with Ashanti. The lyrics revolve around sexuality and innuendo with the title phrase "Good Good". It received positive reviews from music critics, and several commentators cited it as the best track from the album. The song peaked at number 30 on the Hot R&B/Hip-Hop Songs Billboard chart. A well-received music video, directed by Melina Matsoukas, was released to promote the single; Ashanti said that it focused on sexual fantasy with influences from pin-up models. She promoted "Good Good" through live performances.

== Background and composition ==
Jermaine Dupri and Manuel Seal produced "Good Good" and wrote it with Ashanti. The song was recorded by John Horesco IV, and it samples Elton John's 1974 single "Bennie and the Jets" and Michael Jackson's 1982 single "The Girl Is Mine". "Good Good" includes the piano melody from the John song, which Billy Johnson Jr. of Yahoo! Music described as a "more subdued" take on the original in order "to escape a barrage of comparisons to Elton's version". In 2008, "Good Good" was the second single from Ashanti's fourth studio album The Declaration (2008). It was released through The Inc., Universal, and Written Entertainment.

The song's lyrics revolve around sexual innuendo with the phrase "Good Good". American singer-songwriter Kehlani re-used the concept in her 2015 song of the same name. According to Ashanti, Nelly developed the idea during a recording session. She sings about her lover through the lyrics: "Ladies don't believe half what you hear, cause it's all a waste of time/ If you know you got that good, good good, everything will be just fine." "Good Good" also features Ashanti discussing "her abilities to please in bed". Her mother and manager Tina Douglas referred to it as a "feel-good record", and said that Ashanti requested that the composition have a "bounce". A writer for The Post-Tribune described the instrumental as "playful".

== Reception ==
"Good Good" received positive reviews from music critics. In an article for International Women's Day, Da'Shan Smith of Billboard included it in its list of songs about female empowerment. From the same publication, a separate reviewer praised Ashanti's confidence and vocals. A writer for Rap-Up, Steve Jones of USA Today, and a contributor for Metacritic cited it as the strongest track from The Declaration. Praising the track as "bouncy [and] attitude-laden", Ashante Infantry of the Toronto Star felt that it should have been the album's lead single. In a more negative review, Brett Johnson, writing for the Associated Press, said Ashanti's "sexy-soul" songs, "Good Good" and "Body on Me", contradict the album's "good-girl balladry", "Mother" and "Shine".

Commercially, "Good Good" peaked at number 30 on the Hot R&B/Hip-Hop Songs Billboard chart on September 27, 2008, and remained on the chart for 20 weeks.

== Promotion ==
A music video, directed by Melina Matsoukas, was released to promote the single, and features Nelly as one of the lead characters. While discussing the visual, Ashanti said that it focused on reality versus fantasy with influences from pin-up models. She felt that the video's message was about how to keep your significant other through sex appeal, citing a scene in which she cleans the house while wearing high heels, diamonds, and sunglasses as an example.

The music video received positive reviews from critics. In an article about the video, a contributor for Uproxx wrote: "Is it just me or Ashanti keeps getting sexier?" A reviewer from Rap-Up praised its art direction, and identified it as Ashanti's strongest release at that point. A writer from the same publication described it as one of the top ten music videos from 2008. It was uploaded on Ashanti's YouTube account on December 19, 2009, and a behind-the-scenes video was released on YouTube on January 25, 2011.

Ashanti also promoted the song through live performances. On June 13, 2008, she performed "Good Good" on The Tonight Show with Jay Leno. During a 2008 tour, she sang it while dressed in a tight black outfit and posed in front of an oversized milkshake prop. The same year, she performed the single as part of J&R's MusicFest.

== Credits and personnel ==
Credits adapted from the liner notes of The Declaration:

- Co-producer – Manuel Seal
- Producer – Jermaine Dupri
- Recorded By – John Horesco IV
- Written By – Ashanti Douglas, Jermaine Dupri, Manuel Seal

== Charts ==
Weekly chart performance for "Good Good"
Chart (2008)	Peak position
US Hot R&B/Hip-Hop Songs (Billboard)	30
