= Body on Me (Nelly song) =

Single by Nelly featuring Ashanti and Akon

from the album Brass Knuckles and The Declaration
- Released: June 10, 2008
- Recorded: 2008
- Studio: Tiki Recording Studios (Glen Cove, NY)
- Genre: Hip hop; R&B
- Length: 3:31 (Brass Knuckles version); 3:20 (The Declaration version); 3:57 (alternative version); 2:57 (UK radio edit)
- Label: Derrty; Universal Motown
- Songwriters: Cornell Haynes, Jr.; Aliaune Thiam; Ashanti Douglas; Giorgio Tuinfort
- Producers: Akon; Giorgio Tuinfort

Nelly singles chronology
"Here I Am" (2008)	"Body on Me" (2008)	"Stepped on My J'z" (2008)

Ashanti singles chronology
"The Way That I Love You" (2008)	"Body on Me" (2008)	"Good Good" (2008)

Akon singles chronology
"Get Low Wit It" (2008)	"Body on Me" (2008)	"That's Right" (2008)

Alternative cover
- Promotional cover

"Body on Me" is a song by American rapper Nelly featuring American singers Akon and Ashanti. It was recorded for Ashanti's fourth album The Declaration and Nelly's fifth album Brass Knuckles. The track is produced by Akon and Giorgio Tuinfort. It was released as Ashanti's third single from The Declaration, and Nelly's second single from Brass Knuckles.

== Background ==
The track was originally intended to be Ashanti's second single, from her album The Declaration, but instead it became the second single from Nelly's album Brass Knuckles. The track appears on both albums, and it went for adds at rhythm crossover and urban radio stations October 28, 2008. The song was released as a digital download June 10, 2008 The song was originally made for former B2K member Lil' Fizz, a version leaked in late 2006. However, Akon decided to take the song back once Lil Fizz was told he would not be releasing an album. It was then given to Nelly to use. There are four different versions of "Body on Me". Nelly has three versions, and Ashanti has one. In Nelly's first version of the song, only Ashanti's first verse is used, and Nelly does the second and third verses. That version is 3:57. On the second version of the song, Nelly's first two verses are used, and a different third verse by Ashanti is used. This is the album version. There is also one version which doesn't feature Ashanti.

On Ashanti's version, it's the opposite. She has two verses and only Nelly's first verse is used, and she adds ad-libs. Her version is shorter, at 3:20. Akon sings the chorus on both versions. The version that is being released is the Nelly version. The radio edit cuts the song by about 25 seconds, making the song 3:33.

== Music video ==
The music video was shot in Las Vegas at the Red Rock Casino, Resort, & Spa. The video was directed by Benny Boom. The music video premiered on FNMTV on July 18, 2008 alongside the video for "Good Good".

The video begins with the opening credits "20 Miles West Of Vegas" and moving over to a casino while cutting back to slot machines. It then cuts to Ashanti in a beige dress walking into the casino with a group of female friends with "Body On Me" written on the screen. As they are walking in they walk past 3 Lamborghini's with Nelly and Akon and their male friends in. They then get out and follow Ashanti inside. They all enter the V.I.P entrance. The video continues with Ashanti in different outfits around the pool and Nelly admiring her. The video comes to an end in a casino where the TV screens say "Starring tonight: Ashanti" and she goes on stage to sing her verse in the song. It finished with Ashanti and Nelly laughing and joking by a bar and then running off.

== Charts ==
"Body on Me" charted at number 57 on the Canadian Hot 100 and number 78 on the Billboard Hot 100 in the United States, but dropped off both charts the following week. Shortly after the release of the song's music video, it re-entered the Hot 100, and eventually peaked at number 42. The song sold 300,000 downloads. In the United Kingdom it was released as a download on July 28, 2008. "Body on Me" also peaked on the UK Singles Chart at number 17.

=== Weekly charts ===
Chart (2008)	Peak position
Australia (ARIA)	32
Canada Hot 100 (Billboard)	57
Ireland (IRMA)	12
New Zealand (Recorded Music NZ)	19
Scottish Singles Sales (Official Charts)	18
Slovakia Airplay (ČNS IFPI)	75
UK Singles (Official Charts)	17
UK Hip Hop/R&B (Official Charts)	3
US Billboard Hot 100	42
US Dance Singles Sales (Billboard)	44
US Hot R&B/Hip-Hop Songs (Billboard)	69
US Hot Rap Songs (Billboard)	10
US Rhythmic Airplay (Billboard)	7
US Pop 100 (Billboard)	58

=== Year-end charts ===
Chart (2008)	Position
US Rhythmic (Billboard)	33

== Certifications ==
Region	Certification	Certified units/sales
Brazil (Pro-Música Brasil)	Gold	30,000^{‡}
New Zealand (RMNZ)	2× Platinum	60,000^{‡}
United Kingdom (BPI)	Silver	200,000^{‡}
^{‡} Sales+streaming figures based on certification alone.
