= Brass Knuckles (album) =

Studio album by Nelly
- Released: September 16, 2008
- Genre: Hip hop
- Length: 58:15
- Labels: Derrty; Universal Motown; Universal
- Producers: Akon; Tha Bizness; Boom-Batts; Droop-E; Jermaine Dupri; Free Agentz; Sean Garrett; G Koop; James "JLack" Lackey; Neff-U; The Neptunes; Polow da Don; Giorgio Tuinfort; Andrew Wansel; Wyshmaster

Nelly chronology
Sweatsuit (2005)	Brass Knuckles (2008)	5.0 (2010)

Singles from Brass Knuckles
- 1. "Wadsyaname" Released: August 21, 2007; 2. "Party People" Released: April 15, 2008; 3. "Body on Me" Released: June 10, 2008; 4. "Stepped on My J'z" Released: July 1, 2008; 5. "One and Only" Released: November 18, 2008

Brass Knuckles is the fifth studio album by American rapper Nelly. It was released on September 16, 2008, through Derrty Entertainment and Universal Motown Records. For the project, Nelly worked with a wide range of producers and collaborators, including Tha Bizness, Droop-E, Jermaine Dupri, Sean Garrett, G Koop, Neff-U, The Neptunes, Polow da Don, and Wyshmaster. Guest vocalists on the album include Fergie, Usher, Ciara, Lil Wayne, Snoop Dogg, Ashanti, and LL Cool J.

Critics saw Brass Knuckles as a solid, well-produced pop-rap album with consistent highlights, but few groundbreaking moments, ultimately maintaining rather than elevating Nelly's status. It debuted at number 3 on the US Billboard 200 with first-week sales of 83,717 copies, but quickly dropped off the chart and sold just over 223,000 copies by 2010. Although it was eventually certified gold, the album was significantly less successful than Nelly's previous releases, both in the United States and internationally.

"Wadsyaname," released in August 2007, was originally intended as the album's lead single but was primarily issued to fulfill Nelly's contract with Universal Motown and was later replaced by "Party People" amid the album's repeated delays. Further singles, including "Body on Me" with Akon and Ashanti, and Stepped on My J'z with Ciara and Dupri, were released in 2008, preceding the full album's September release. In 2008, Nelly embarked on The Brass Knuckles Tour in support of the album.

== Background ==
In September 2004, Nelly released the albums Sweat and Suit. Suit, an R&B-oriented album, debuted at number one on the Billboard 200 chart, while Sweat, a rap-oriented album, opened at number two. Boosted by the success of the singles "My Place", "Over and Over", "Tilt Ya Head Back", "N Dey Say", and "Grillz," both albums sold more than 4.3 million copies combined in the United States and also achieved widespread international success comparable to his earlier releases Country Grammar and Nellyville.

For his next album, Nelly planned to work with a variety of producers, including Bryan-Michael Cox, Theron Feemster, Polow da Don, Jermaine Dupri, and Pharrell Williams, among others. Nelly aimed for some high-profile collaborations, notably attempting to bring together Janet Jackson, Mariah Carey, and himself on one track, as well as expressing interest in working with Bruce Springsteen. Regarding the album's concept, Nelly explained that he wanted it to make a strong impact with a symbolic cover rather than just featuring his face. He noted that, while the album was not as melodic as his previous work, it still included smoother tracks, some of which he worked on with Babyface, though their song ultimately went unused.

== Singles ==
"Cut It Out," featuring rappers Pimp C and Sean P of YoungBloodZ and released in 2007, was initially rumored to be the album's first single. However, it was later confirmed as a promotional track, with "Wadsyaname," released digitally on August 21, 2007, ultimately taking its place as the official lead single. Originally intended as a standalone track rather than a single from the album, it was produced and released primarily to fulfill contractual obligations with Universal Motown, with whom Nelly had been in dispute over payments for some time. "Wadsyaname," produced by Tha Bizness, was later included as a bonus track on the Japanese edition of Brass Knuckles.

Beset by long delays, "Party People" featuring Fergie was eventually seclected as the lead single from Brass Knuckles. It was released on March 18, 2008 and peaked at number forty on the US Billboard Hot 100 and number fourteen on the UK Singles Chart. The album's second single "Body on Me", which features Akon and Ashanti, was released on June 9, 2008. It peaked at number forty-two on the US Billboard Hot 100 and number three on the UK Singles Chart. Just two days later, "Stepped on My J'z", which features Ciara and Jermaine Dupri was released on June 11, 2008. It peaked at number ninety on the US Billboard Hot 100. After several single releases amid delays, accompanied by noticeable anticipation, the full Brass Knuckles album was released in September 2008.

== Critical reception ==
Professional ratings
Aggregate scores
Source	Rating
Metacritic	61/100
Review scores
Source	Rating
AllMusic	3/5 stars
HipHopDX	3/5
IGN	7.5/10
musicOMH	3/5 stars
NOW	3/5 stars
PopMatters	5/10
RapReviews	8/10
Rolling Stone	3/5 stars
Slant Magazine	2/5 stars
URB	2.5/5 stars

Reviews for the album were generally mixed. At Metacritic, which assigns a normalized rating out of 100 to reviews from mainstream critics, Brass Knuckles has an average score of 61 based on nine reviews. Billboard's Mariel Concepcion called 5.0 a "solid, well-rounded album" and added: "The 36-year-old artist gives fans the stuff they fell in love with 10 years ago on debut Country Grammar—and with a new pop-driven sound, he demonstrates he hasn’t lost a beat." IGN found that the album had Nelly moving "deeper into the realm of pop," further writing: "For all its perceived posturing Brass Knuckles takes what Nelly explored on Sweat and Suit and condenses it into one singular album. To this end it is more of the same from the St. Louis rapper, delivering sing-song slices of urban pop wrapped up in swagger and circumstance." PopMatters critic Chris Gaerig felt that Brass Knuckles was Nelly's "most consistent record. There's nothing that's boldly offensive or immediately dismissible, save a few slight missteps. It's possible then that Nelly's turn toward hip-hop legitimacy actually did make him a better rapper." Azeem Ahmad from musicOMH felt that there was a "sense of liberation from the restriction of Sweat/Suit helped in no small part by relatively unknown Atlanta producer Polow da Don's desk-work on four of Brass Knuckles' tracks."

AllMusic editor David Jeffries found that Brass Knuckles was "neither a disaster nor a brilliant mistake. It's an album where the forgettable lows marginalize the towering highs, while the feeling that something is missing covers it all. Maybe it's [...] the lack of any fresh, breakthrough number, but this parade of mostly unsurprising pop-rap tracks has no anchor. Still, there are plenty of winners." Writing for, Christian Hoard remarked that "Nelly has mastered his own brand of crossover appeal. On his fifth album, he mostly sticks to that pop-rap formula, cranking his distinctly melodic flow to hyper-speeds and playing the good-natured hedonist on cuts like "Party People." But when he tries to come off hard on a handful of Dirty South brawlers, he ends up sounding generic. Now concluded: "It's sure not a knockout, but it's his hardest-hitting album yet. Just don't call it a comeback." Pharoh Martin of Vibe stated that Brass Knuckles was "standard Nelly fare," with Steve Juon, writing for RapReviews, noting that "underneath the materialistic veneer Nelly's got a good delivery, sharp lyrics and impeccable breath control." XXL editor Paul Cantor concluded that "instead of elevating the St. Louis rapper's status, the project merely maintains the status quo. Even if this album isn't as noteworthy as his previous efforts, Nelly cranks out a few surefire moments of greatness that prove he can still make it go down, down, baby."

== Commercial performance ==
Brass Knuckles debuted at number 3 on the US Billboard 200, selling 83,717 copies in its first week in the United States. Only 8 weeks later, the album was left on the Billboard 200 chart, re-appearing at number 152 in the week of March 21, 2009. On December 12, 2008, Brass Knuckles was certified gold by the Recording Industry Association of America (RIAA) for shipping over 500,000 copies in the United States. By September 2010, it had sold over 223,000 copies in the United States. In 2011, during an interview for VH1's documentary series Behind the Music, Nelly expressed his dissatisfaction with the album's overall performance and the material he had produced for it, admitting that Brass Knuckles "wasn't my best work. My mind wasn't in it, I wasn't prepared. Four years had passed, so much had happened. I didn't deliver the music. I'll take responsibility for that."

== Track listing ==
Brass Knuckles track listing
No.	Title	Writer(s)	Producer(s)	Length
1.	"U Ain't Him" (featuring Rick Ross)	Cornell Haynes, Jr.; William Roberts II; Adam Cherrington	Wyshmaster	3:15
2.	"Hold Up" (featuring T.I. and LL Cool J)	Haynes; Rufus Morgan; Tadd Mingo; Clifford Harris, Jr.; Todd Smith	Free Agentz	3:48
3.	"LA" (featuring Snoop Dogg and Nate Dogg)	Haynes; Calvin Broadus, Jr.; Nathaniel Hale; Christopher Whitacre; Justin Henderson	Tha Bizness	4:23
4.	"Long Night" (featuring Usher)	Haynes; Ryon Lovette; Usher Raymond IV; James "JLack" Lackey	Lackey	3:15
5.	"Lie" (featuring St. Lunatics)	Haynes; Jamal Jones; Brian Kennedy; Ali Jones; Robert Cleveland; Torhi Harper	Polow da Don	4:20
6.	"Party People" (featuring Fergie)	Haynes; Jones; Garrett Hamler; Stacy Ferguson	Polow da Don; Garrett	3:58
7.	"Self-Esteem" (featuring Chuck D)	Haynes; Robert Mandell; Carlton Ridenhour	G Koop	3:37
8.	"Body on Me" (featuring Akon and Ashanti)	Haynes; Aliaune Thiam; Giorgio Tuinfort; Ashanti Douglas	Akon; Tuinfort	3:29
9.	"Stepped on My J'z" (featuring Ciara and Jermaine Dupri)	Haynes; Dupri; James Phillips	Dupri	5:03
10.	"Let It Go Lil' Mama" (featuring Pharrell)	Haynes; Pharrell Williams	The Neptunes	4:22
11.	"One and Only"	Haynes; Jones; Darnell Dalton; Lamar Taylor	Haynes; Andrew "Papa Justifi" Wansel	4:20
12.	"Chill" (featuring St. Lunatics)	Haynes; Adam Cherrington; Jones; Cleveland; Harper; Lavell Webb	Wyshmaster	5:42
13.	"Who Fucks wit Me" (featuring Avery Storm)	Haynes; Matthew Battle; Christopher Saleh	Boom-Batt Productions	4:08
14.	"Ucud Gedit" (featuring Gucci Mane and R. Kelly)	Haynes; Jones; Robert Kelly; Radric Davis	Polow da Don	4:28
Total length:				58:15

Walmart bonus tracks
No.	Title	Writer(s)	Producer(s)	Length
15.	"Bay"	Haynes; Earl Stevens, Jr.	Droop-E	3:42
16.	"Problems"	Haynes; Jones	Polow da Don	3:11
Total length:				65:09

Japanese bonus tracks
No.	Title	Writer(s)	Producer(s)	Length
17.	"Wadsyaname"	Haynes	Tha Bizness	4:07
Total length:				66:05

iTunes bonus tracks
No.	Title	Writer(s)	Producer(s)	Length
18.	"Warrior"	Haynes; Haynes; Theron "Neff-U" Feemster	Feemster	2:43
19.	"Let's Go"	Haynes; Cherrington	Wyshmaster	3:44
Total length:				64:44

Sample credits

- "Stepped on My J'z" contains a sample of "Tipsy" performed by J-Kwon.
- "Wadsyaname" samples elements from "All My Life" by K-Ci & JoJo.

== Charts ==
=== Weekly charts ===
Weekly chart performance for Brass Knuckles
Chart (2008)	Peak position
Australian Albums (ARIA)	15
Belgian Albums (Ultratop Flanders)	90
Canadian Albums (Billboard)	22
French Albums (SNEP)	88
Irish Albums (IRMA)	60
Japanese Albums (Oricon)	6
New Zealand Albums (RMNZ)	22
Scottish Albums (Official Charts)	34
Swiss Albums (Schweizer Hitparade)	55
UK Albums (Official Charts)	20
UK R&B Albums (Official Charts)	6
US Billboard 200	3
US Top R&B/Hip-Hop Albums (Billboard)	2
US Top Rap Albums (Billboard)	1

=== Year-end charts ===
Year-end chart performance for Brass Knuckles
Chart (2008)	Position
US Top R&B/Hip-Hop Albums (Billboard)	78

== Certifications ==
Certifications for Brass Knuckles
Region	Certification	Certified units/sales
United States (RIAA)	Gold	500,000^{^}
^{^} Shipments figures based on certification alone.
