= Ashanti (singer) =

American singer and songwriter (born 1980)

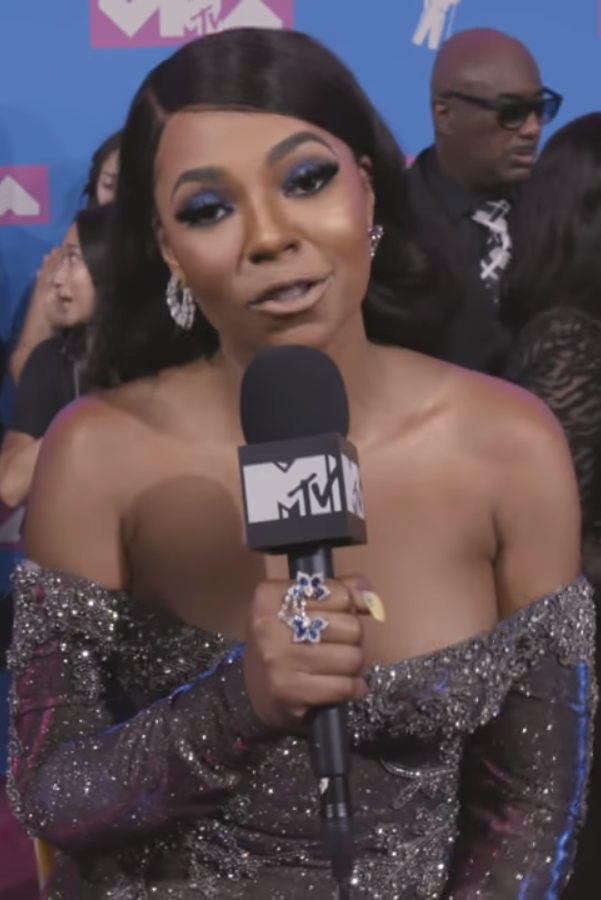
- Ashanti in 2018

Background information
- Born: Ashanti Shequoiya Douglas; October 13, 1980 (age 46); Glen Cove, New York, U.S.
- Genres: R&B; pop; hip hop; soul
- Occupations: Singer; songwriter; actress
- Works: Ashanti discography
- Years active: 1992–present
- Labels: Written; eOne; AJM; Murder Inc.; Def Jam; Island Def Jam
- Spouse: Nelly (m. 2023)
- Website: ashantithisisme.com

Ashanti Shequoiya Douglas (born October 13, 1980) is an American singer, songwriter and actress. She was discovered as a teenager by record producer Irv Gotti, and signed with his label Murder Inc. Records, an imprint of Def Jam Recordings in 2002. That same year, Ashanti guest appeared on the singles "What's Luv?" by Fat Joe, and "Always on Time" by Ja Rule, which peaked at numbers two and one on the Billboard Hot 100, respectively; the latter, with her 2002 debut single "Foolish", made her the first female artist to occupy the top two positions the chart simultaneously. (Note: On the week dated April 20, 2002.)

Ashanti's eponymous debut album (2002) debuted atop the Billboard 200, received triple platinum certification by the Recording Industry Association of America (RIAA), won Best Contemporary R&B Album at the 45th Annual Grammy Awards, and spawned the Billboard Hot 100-top 40 singles "Happy" and "Baby". She then co-wrote and provided background vocals for Jennifer Lopez's 2002 single "Ain't It Funny (Murder Remix)", which peaked the Billboard Hot 100. Her second album, Chapter II (2003), became her second to peak the Billboard 200 and received platinum certification by the RIAA. It received three nominations at the 46th Annual Grammy Awards, while its lead singles, "Rock wit U (Awww Baby)" and "Rain on Me", peaked at numbers two and seven on the Billboard Hot 100, respectively. Her third album, Ashanti's Christmas, was released that same year as a Christmas album; it was met with a steep critical and commercial decline.

Ashanti's fourth album, Concrete Rose (2004), debuted at number seven on the Billboard 200 despite mixed critical response. Its lead single, "Only U", peaked at number 13 on the Billboard Hot 100 and number two on the UK Singles Chart—her most successful song in that country. Its second single, "Don't Let Them", saw limited success due to Def Jam's legal issues with Murder Inc. label head Irv Gotti. Her fifth album, The Declaration (2008), was met with moderate reception and became her final release on a major label; her sixth album, Braveheart (2014), was released independently. Ashanti has sold nearly 30 million records worldwide.

Ashanti has acted in several productions, debuting in the film Coach Carter and starring in the TV special The Muppets' Wizard of Oz (both 2005), the latter of which attracted nearly eight million viewers. She also appeared in John Tucker Must Die (2006) and Resident Evil: Extinction (2007).

== Early life ==
Ashanti Shequoiya Douglas was born on October 13, 1980, in Glen Cove, New York. Her mother, Tina Douglas, is African American and a former dance teacher. Her father, Ken-Kaide Thomas Douglas, is also African American and a former singer. She is the oldest of her parents' children, with a younger sister named Kenashia "Shia" Douglas. Ashanti's mother named her after the Ashanti Empire in Ghana; in this nation, women had power and influence, and Tina wanted Ashanti to follow that model. Her grandfather, James, was a civil rights activist who was associated with Martin Luther King Jr. in the 1960s.

Ashanti's mother discovered her full singing potential when she overheard Ashanti singing Mary J. Blige's "Reminisce" at age 12 (after the song was released on Ashanti's birthday). While attending high school, Ashanti began to write songs. As a teenager, she performed in a local talent show and at several small festivals. She got her first taste of acting as a child extra in Spike Lee's Malcolm X (1992) and in Ted Demme's Who's the Man?. She also had a couple of minor appearances in music videos, such as KRS-One's "MC's Act Like They Don't Know" as well as 8-Off's "Ghetto Girl".

Ashanti struggled to find success as a singer after being courted by several record labels, including Bad Boy and Jive. Despite this, she continued to perform in and around New York and began hanging out at the Murder Inc. recording studio, hoping for a big break.

== Career ==
=== 2001–2003: Ashanti, Chapter II and Ashanti's Christmas ===
Ashanti was first noticed by Irv Gotti because of her vocal skills. He asked her to pen hooks for his rap artists and to perform with them in duets. Ashanti provided the melodic response to their call. Ashanti was first featured as a background vocalist on rapper Big Pun's song "How We Roll". In the same year, Ashanti was featured on fellow labelmate Cadillac Tah's singles "Pov City Anthem" and "Just Like a Thug". She also appeared on the 2001 The Fast and the Furious soundtrack as a featured artist on Vita's 2001 hip hop remake of Madonna's "Justify My Love" and on the solo track "When a Man Does Wrong". She was then featured on Fat Joe's "What's Luv?" and Ja Rule's "Always on Time". "What's Luv?" and "Always on Time" were released simultaneously and became two of the biggest hit songs of 2002. Ashanti became the first woman to occupy the top two positions on the U.S. Billboard Hot 100 chart simultaneously when "Always on Time" and "What's Luv?" were at numbers one and two, respectively.

Following the success of her collaborations with Ja Rule and Fat Joe, Ashanti released her debut single, "Foolish", which contains a sample of the 1983 song "Stay with Me" by DeBarge (also used by The Notorious B.I.G. in his 1995 single "One More Chance", and by Big L in "MVP"). This is her biggest success to date, spending ten weeks atop the Billboard Hot 100. She became the second artist (after The Beatles) to have their first three chart entries in the top ten of the Hot 100 simultaneously. Ashanti's self-titled debut album, Ashanti, was released on Irv Gotti's Murder Inc. record label in April 2002. It debuted at number one on the U.S. Billboard 200 albums chart. The album has been certified triple platinum in the United States and sold six million copies worldwide. Ashanti wrote the album's twelve tracks, most of which were written on the spot in the studio. Ashanti's follow-up singles, "Happy" and "Baby", were not as successful as her debut single but peaked inside the top ten and top twenty in the U.S., respectively. Ashanti's debut album earned her many awards, including eight Billboard Music Awards, two American Music Awards, and a Grammy Award in 2003 for Best Contemporary R&B Album. Ashanti was the first artist to win Best Contemporary R&B Album before the category was last awarded in 2011. She was nominated as Best New Artist and "Foolish" was nominated in the Best Female R&B Vocal Performance category. She also received a Comet Award and two Soul Train Music Awards that same year.

Ashanti became the subject of controversy when it was announced that she would receive the Soul Train Aretha Franklin Award for "Entertainer of the Year". A high school student took offense and started an online petition against her, explaining to The Seattle Times that she was too new to deserve the award. Nearly 30,000 people agreed with him, signing the petition. Many said that established artists such as Mary J. Blige and Missy "Misdemeanor" Elliott or critically acclaimed singers like Alicia Keys and India Arie were more deserving of an award that carries the name of a musical legend. Despite the petition, the Soul Train committee and Don Cornelius stuck by their decision. Ashanti was applauded by her musical peers as she entered the Pasadena Civic Auditorium to accept her award and she was supported onstage by Patti LaBelle, who stated "she's a baby and we have to support our babies."

Just before the release of her second album, Ashanti headlined VH1 Divas Duets alongside Whitney Houston, Chaka Khan, Beyoncé, and Lisa Marie Presley. During the concert, she performed duets with the Isley Brothers and Stevie Wonder and participated in the all-star finale performance of Wonder's "Higher Ground."

In July 2003, Ashanti released her second album, Chapter II, which debuted at number one on the Billboard 200, with first-week sales of 326,000 copies in the U.S. The album went platinum, selling over 1.5 a million copies in the U.S. Chapter II's first single, "Rock wit U (Awww Baby)", became a hit, peaking at number two on the Billboard Hot 100. Its video, which showed Ashanti in a bikini frolicking on a beach and riding an elephant, was nominated for two 2003 MTV Video Music Awards. A remix of the song contains interpolations of Michael Jackson's "Rock with You". The second single, "Rain on Me", reached the number seven spot on the Hot 100 and number two on the Hot 100 R&B Songs chart. Chapter II was nominated for a 2004 Grammy Award for Best Contemporary R&B Album, and "Rock wit U (Awww Baby)" and "Rain on Me" were nominated in the categories of Best R&B Song and Best Female R&B Vocal Performance, respectively. In the "Rain on Me," mini-movie music video—directed by Hype Williams and co-starring Larenz Tate—Ashanti portrays a troubled young woman in an abusive relationship. She received a Lifetime Channel Achievement Award for her message speaking out against domestic violence. That same year, she began dating rapper Nelly.

In November 2003, Ashanti released a Christmas album titled Ashanti's Christmas. It contained 10 Christmas songs and was a modest commercial success and sold just around 100,000 units in the U.S. The album peaked at No. 160 in the Billboard charts.

=== 2004–2007: Concrete Rose, Collectibles by Ashanti and acting ===
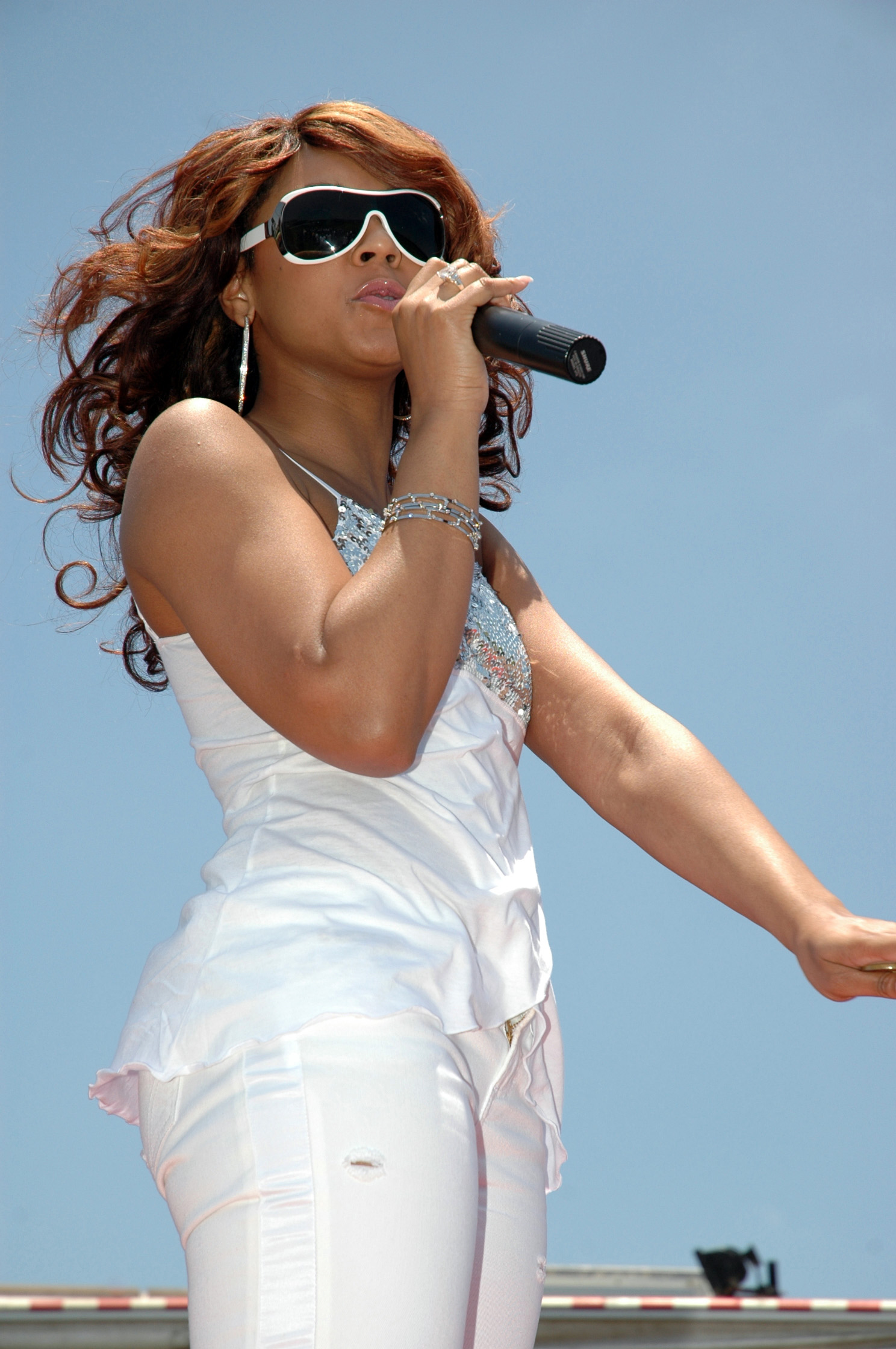
Ashanti in 2005

Before Concrete Rose was released, Ashanti did some major promotion for her single "Only U", when she premiered it at the 2004 Vibe Music Awards. She featured on "Wonderful"—with Ja Rule and R. Kelly—that year, which peaked at number five in the U.S. and at number one in the UK. In December 2004, Ashanti released her third studio album, Concrete Rose, the title of which took on Tupac Shakur's pseudonym "The Rose That Grew from Concrete". The album debuted at number seven in the U.S., with first-week sales of 254,000 copies, and eventually became her third platinum-certified album. The first single, "Only U", reached number thirteen on the Billboard Hot 100 and became her biggest hit in the United Kingdom, peaking at number two. A second single, the ballad "Don't Let Them", garnered little chart success after Def Jam refused to fund a music video due to Irv Gotti's legal troubles during his money laundering trial. The single was released only in the U.S., where it failed to chart, and the UK, where it reached the lower end of the top forty. After the release of Concrete Rose, Ashanti released the DVD Ashanti: The Making of a Star, which was available only for a limited time. The deluxe DVD includes an exclusive photo and video shoot footage, music from the albums Ashanti, Chapter II and Concrete Rose, special concert footage, unreleased childhood school performances, and behind-the-scenes interviews with family, friends, and fans.

In 2005, Ashanti focused more on her acting career, making her feature film acting debut in the film Coach Carter alongside Samuel L. Jackson, as well as starring as Dorothy Gale in the made-for-television film The Muppets' Wizard of Oz, which pulled in nearly 8 million viewers when it premiered. She sang "When I'm with You" for the film which was nominated for a Primetime Emmy in the Outstanding Music and Lyrics category. In Coach Carter, she played a pregnant teenager named Kyra who has to decide whether or not to abort her unborn child. The movie opened at number-one at the U.S. box office, eventually grossing $67 million domestically. Later in 2005, Ashanti was invited to Oprah Winfrey's Legends Ball, which honored some of the most influential and legendary African American women of the twentieth century in the fields of art, entertainment, and civil rights. In December 2005, Ashanti released a remix album of Concrete Rose titled Collectables by Ashanti. The album was an opportunity for her to fulfill her contract with Def Jam (and have the option of working with another label). It did not fare well on the charts.

In 2006, she starred in the teen comedy John Tucker Must Die, which opened and peaked at number three at the U.S. box office (competing with Pirates of the Caribbean: Dead Man's Chest and Miami Vice) and grossed $68,818,076 worldwide. In 2007, she played a supporting role in the action film Resident Evil: Extinction (2007).

=== 2008–2010: The Declaration, departure from The Inc. and The Wiz ===
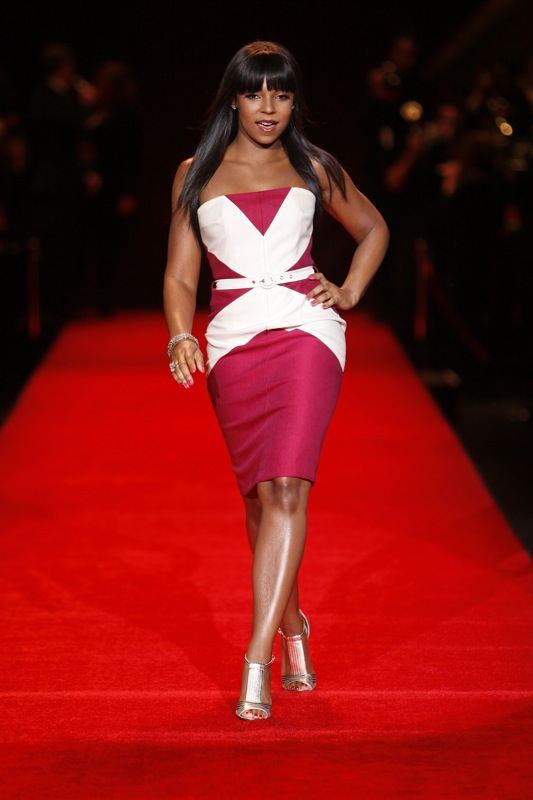
Ashanti at the Heart Truth Fashion Show in 2008

Her fourth studio album, The Declaration, was released on June 3, 2008, and sold 86,000 units its first week of release, which were the lowest first-week sales for any of Ashanti's studio albums. In mid-2007, MTV News reported that the first single from The Declaration was "Switch", which was produced by Shy Carter and released digitally in the United States on July 24, 2007. It was later reported that "Switch" may not be included on the album's track listing, and that the first single would be "Hey Baby (After the Club)" it was released to radio and digital outlets on October 16. The song, which does not appear on the U.S. editions of the album, peaked at number eighty-seven on the Billboard Hot R&B/Hip-Hop Songs chart. "The Way That I Love You", was released to radio and digital outlets in January 2008, and was referred to as the "first single" in press material and media reports.

It reached number two on the Hot R&B/Hip-Hop Songs chart and number thirty-seven on the Billboard Hot 100, becoming Ashanti's first song to reach the top forty since "Only U" in 2004. "Body On Me" was recorded not only for Ashanti's The Declaration, but also for Nelly's fifth studio album Brass Knuckles. The track is produced by Akon and Giorgio Tuinfort. It went to number one on Billboard's Hot Videoclip Tracks chart in its first week, becoming the first number-one single from Nelly's album."Good Good" was released to urban radio stations on July 16, 2008. The song contains elements of Elton John's 1974 single "Bennie and the Jets", and has the same melody arrangement as Michael Jackson's "The Girl Is Mine". In July 2008, Ashanti was named an ambassador of tourism for Nassau County, Long Island.

In May 2009, Irv Gotti announced that he was officially releasing Ashanti from The Inc. Records, stating that "The relationship has run its course. The chemistry of what's needed—we're in two totally different places. You're talking to somebody that took her and shaped and molded her and put her out there for the world, and it blew up. We [hold the record] for the [fastest] selling debut by a female R&B artist—503 [thousand]. We did it! My views and philosophies and her views and philosophies are not meeting up." Gotti also admitted that he and Ashanti have not spoken to each other in a long time. A representative for Ashanti did not respond. On September 24, 2009, Ashanti announced her fifth studio album would be released from her new label, Written Entertainment.

Ashanti headlined the cast of The Wiz in the New York City Center Encores! Summer Stars staging from June 12 to July 5, 2009. Ashanti's role as Dorothy has since received mixed reviews from critics as most praised her vocals but was less pleased with her acting ability. BET and Entertainment Weekly both praised the singer's performance as The New York Post and New York Times gave lukewarm reviews. Though the first night was sold out, some of the other shows were unable to follow its success. On October 27, 2008, Ashanti took part in The Yellow Brick Road Not Taken, a one night only concert to celebrate the fifth anniversary of Wicked, featuring songs written by Stephen Schwartz, that were cut from the show.

=== 2011–2014: Hiatus and Braveheart ===
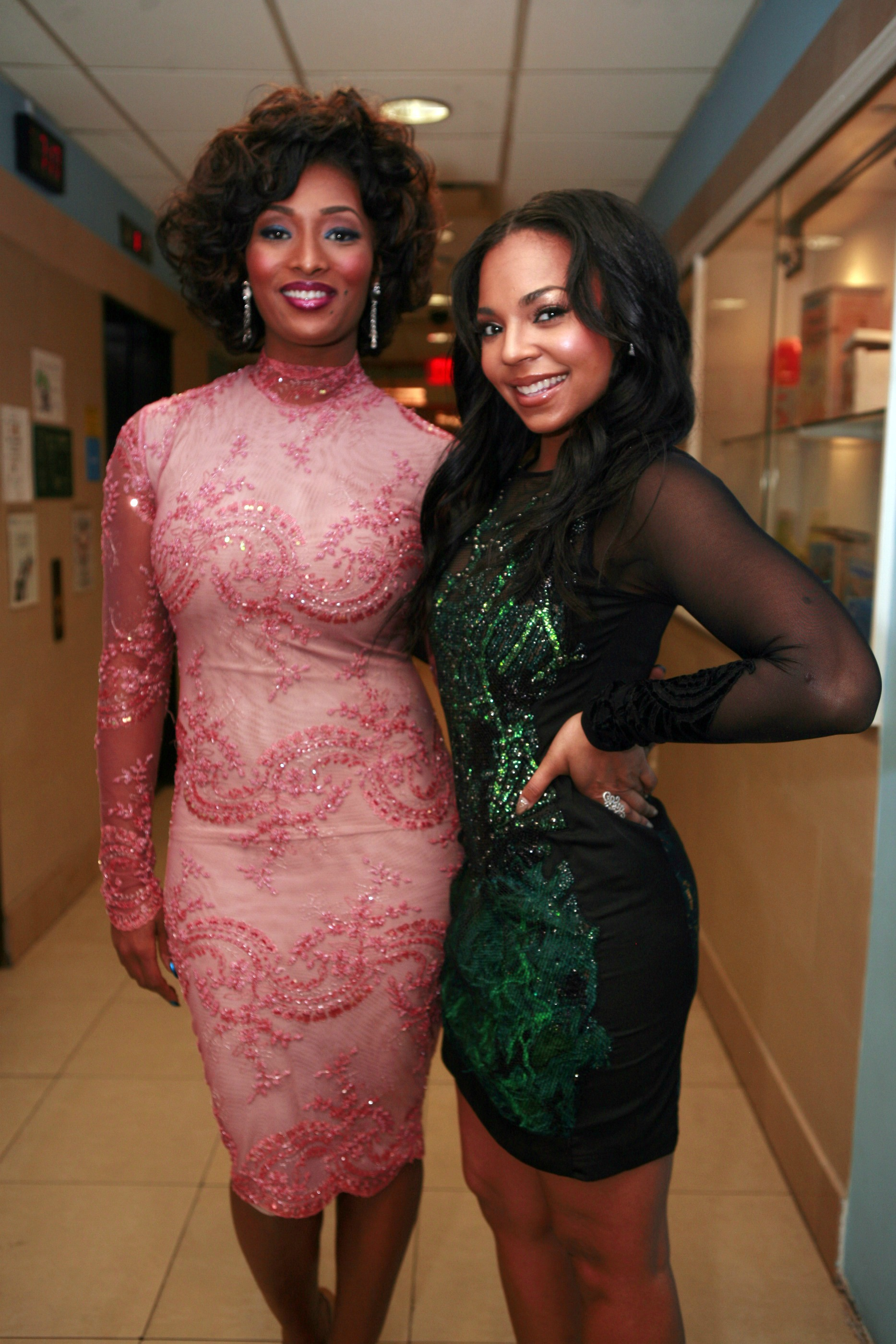
Toccara Jones and Ashanti at the New York Fashion Week of 2012

After a four-year hiatus, Ashanti released the song "Never Too Far Away", which was featured in Morgan Creek's film Dream House starring Daniel Craig, Rachel Weisz with Naomi Watts. The lead single from her fifth studio album, "The Woman You Love" featuring American rapper Busta Rhymes, was released online on December 15, 2011. Ashanti teamed up with Meek Mill and French Montana for the second single "No One Greater", which was produced by 7 Aurelius, Irv Gotti and Chink Santana. In April 2013, she released another single called "Never Should Have", which later won "Best Independent R&B/Soul Performance" at the 2013 Soul Train Awards. A music video for the track was also released.

In November 2012, it was reported that she had landed her first series regular role in the seventh season of Army Wives, playing Latasha Montclair. The series was canceled on September 24, 2013. In the fall of 2013, she appeared in a guest spot on Law & Order: Special Victims Unit alongside Clay Aiken and Taylor Hicks. She also starred in the Lifetime film Christmas in the City which premiered on December 7, 2013.

In August 2013, Ashanti announced her plans to once again work with Ja Rule, who'd been released from prison in July of that year following a six-year sentence stemming from a gun charge. On January 8, 2014, she revealed the official cover art and release date for Braveheart, her fifth album, which was released on March 4, 2014. In January 2014, Ashanti shot the video for the official first single from Braveheart titled "I Got It" featuring Rick Ross. The video was shot in Miami, Florida, and was directed by Eif Rivera. In July, Ashanti announced that the second official single from BraveHeart would be "Early in the Morning" featuring French Montana. Upon release, the album garnered favorable reviews, with music critics describing Braveheart's sound as an "evolution of R&B" and praising the themes of empowerment but criticizing the romantic clichés and lack of interesting moments on the album. On the charts, Braveheart opened at number ten in the U.S. Billboard 200, becoming Ashanti's fifth consecutive top-ten album, as well as her first Independent Albums chart-topper. It also debuted in the top thirty of the UK R&B Albums Chart and top-forty of the UK Indie Albums Chart.

=== 2015–present: Collaborations ===
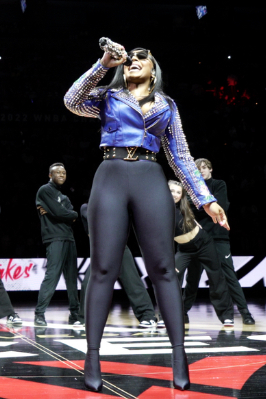
Ashanti performing at the 2023 WNBA Finals in Las Vegas in October 2023.

In 2015, she announced that she had worked on new music for her seventh album, with an unknown release date. Ashanti collaborated with Michelle Obama for her #Let'sMove campaign to spread awareness of drinking water with her new video and song "Let's Go" released in 2015. In 2016, she collaborated on the song "Seven Day Love" included in the album "Inzombia" by Canadian singer Belly. She has also worked with numerous artists, including Sia, Alicia Keys, John Legend, Queen Latifah, Usher and Kelly Clarkson to interpret the songs of the Broadway musical "Hamilton" for the compilation "The Hamilton Mixtape".

In 2017, Ashanti announced her seventh studio album, revealing it would be released in 2018. She denied this in June 2018, confirming the future release of an album in collaboration with rapper Ja Rule. Between 2017 and 2018 she returned to the music scene with several collaborations including the single "Say Less" with Ty Dolla Sign, the track "The Road" by Machel Montano, and the song "Start This Shit Off Right" with Mack Maine, from the album "Tha Carter V" by Lil Wayne.

Ashanti released the collaboration "Pretty Little Thing" with Afro B in August 2019. She was also featured on the soundtrack of the film Stuck, which she produced. In November 2019, Ashanti guest-starred as herself in two episodes of the third season of The CW's Dynasty reboot: "Mother, I'm At La Mirage" and "Something Desperate".

In January 2021, Ashanti released her single "2:35 (I Want You)". On March 10, 2022, Ashanti's single "Rock wit U (Awww Baby)" was heavily sampled for British rapper Aitch's single "Baby". In October 2022, Ashanti was featured on Diddy’s “Gotta Move On” remix which also features Bryson Tiller and Yung Miami. In February 2024, she was featured on Jermaine Dupri's single "This Lil' Game We Play" alongside Nelly and Juicy J.

== Artistry ==
Ashanti has a lyric soprano voice type. Critics have referred to her voice as "pretty" and her soprano as "sultry" and "sweet but slight". Jason Birchmeier of AllMusic noted her reputation for using her "swooning voice" in duets with Big Pun, Fat Joe, and Ja Rule. As a young girl, Ashanti was influenced by Ella Fitzgerald, Whitney Houston, Michael Jackson, Prince, and Tupac Shakur, but she cites Mary J. Blige as the main reason she wanted to pursue a singing career. Further musical influences include Janet Jackson, Mariah Carey, Madonna, Smokey Robinson, Donna Summer, and Blue Magic.

== Philanthropy ==
In 2003, Ashanti partnered with LidRock and the San Francisco-based Family Violence Prevention Fund (FVPF) to raise awareness about the issue of domestic violence during National Domestic Violence Awareness Month and to distribute the "Rain on Me" mini-movie using LidRock's unique platform. Proceeds from the $5 mini-disc went towards helping to stop domestic violence. Ashanti also recorded a public service announcement that appeared in more than 4,000 film screens and reached millions of people. Ashanti also gives back by raising money for sickle cell research and she is active in helping the Make-A-Wish Foundation stating, "I'll go and do just about anything for them." In 2005, Ashanti helped by recording public service announcement and raising money for the Southeast Asia tsunami disaster. Later that year, she helped raise money for the Hurricane Katrina victims and storm evacuees.

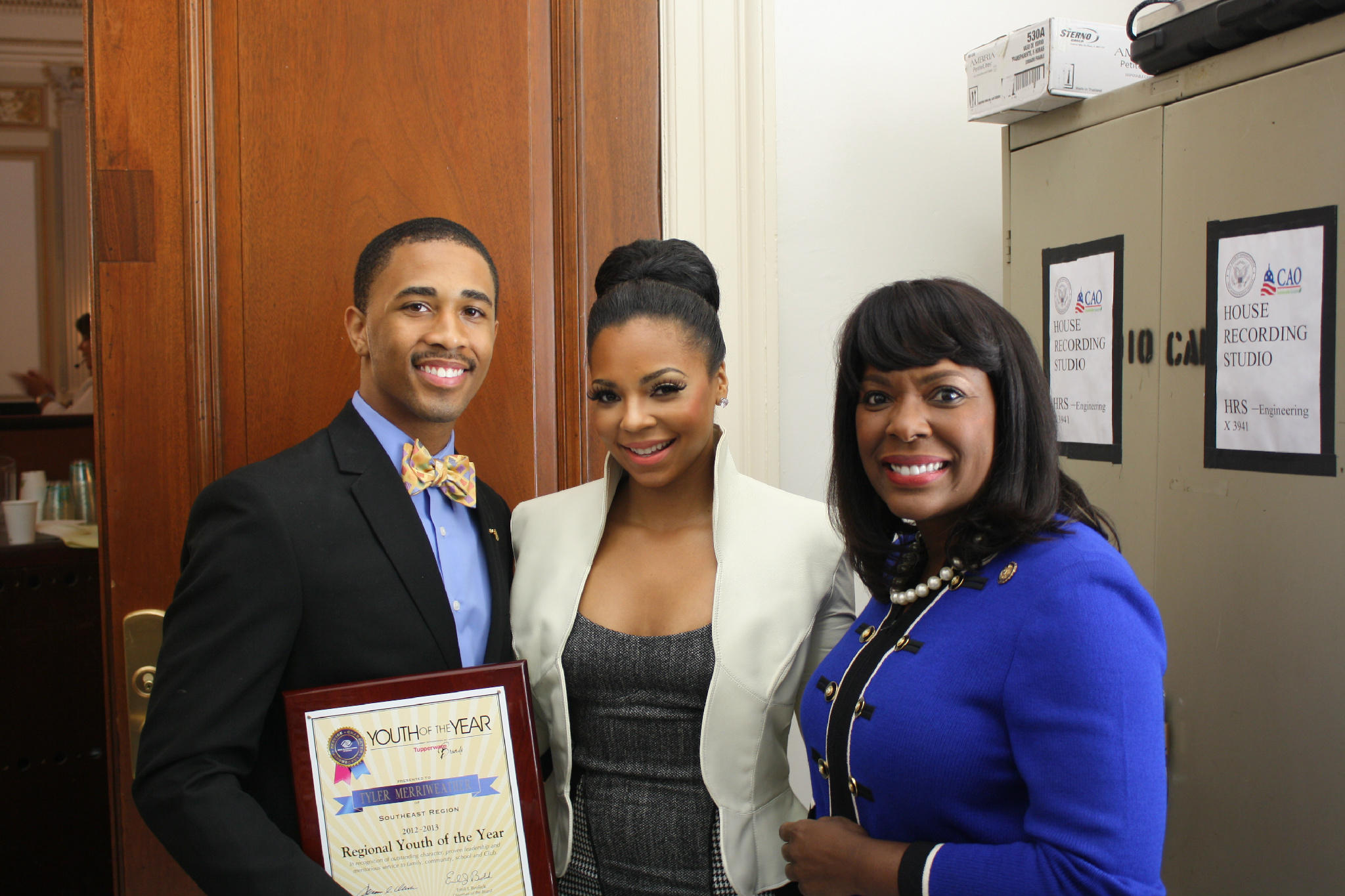
Ashanti receiving Boys & Girls Clubs of America Youth of the Year Ambassador Award in 2012. Also pictured is Representative Terri Sewell.

In November 2009, Ashanti joined the crew of ABC's Extreme Makeover: Home Edition. In the episode, which aired on January 24, 2010, the singer assisted in the rebuilding of the Powell Family home in Buffalo, New York. The efforts from the show expanded significantly to include not just the family home but the entire neighborhood surrounding it. In 2013, Ashanti featured on the 19-track compilation album Songs for a Healthier America, a collaborative project by the Partnership for a Healthier America, whose honorary chair is Michelle Obama, and Hip Hop Public Health. Her song "Just Believe" also featured Artie Green, Gerry Gunn, Robbie Nova and Chauncey Hawkins. Additionally, she is affiliated with the Jumpstart reading program, the Tupperware Brand and the Boys and Girls Club of America.

== Personal life ==
Ashanti dated Nelly from 2003 to 2013 after meeting at the 2003 Grammy Awards. The two began dating again in 2023. In December 2023, it was reported that the couple were expecting their first child together and had married on December 27, 2023. In April 2024, Ashanti confirmed her pregnancy and the couple's engagement in Essence magazine. On July 18, 2024, the couple welcomed their first child, a boy named Kareem Kenkaide Haynes. In 2025, she and Nelly began starring in their own reality series, Nelly & Ashanti: We Belong Together.

== Discography ==
Studio albums

- Ashanti (2002)
- Chapter II (2003)
- Ashanti's Christmas (2003)
- Concrete Rose (2004)
- The Declaration (2008)
- Braveheart (2014)

== Filmography ==
=== Film ===
Year	Title	Role	Notes
1992	Malcolm X	Student in Harlem Classroom	
1993	Who's the Man?	Kid No. 4	
1997	Bouge!	Rudy	
2004	Bride and Prejudice	Herself	
2005	Coach Carter	Kyra	
2005	The Muppets' Wizard of Oz	Dorothy Gale	TV movie
2006	John Tucker Must Die	Heather	
2007	Resident Evil: Extinction	Betty	
2013	Christmas in the City	Teanna Musk	TV movie
2014	Mutant World	The Preacher	
2016	Mothers and Daughters	Kelly	
2017	Stuck	Eve	
2019	Winter Song	Clio	
2021	Honey Girls	Fancy G	
2022	A New Diva’s Christmas Carol	Aphrodite	TV movie
2023	The Plus One	Lizzie Anders	
2025	No Address	Violet	

=== Television ===
Year	Title	Role	Notes
1989	Disneyland	Herself/Child Dancer	Episode: "Polly"
2001	Saturday Night Live	Herself	Episode: "John Goodman/Ja Rule"
2002–05	Top of the Pops	Herself	Recurring Guest
2002	The Saturday Show	Herself	Episode: "Episode #1.41" & "#1.54"
2002	Diary	Herself	Episode: "Ashanti: Princess of Her Domain"
2002	Sabrina the Teenage Witch	Herself	Episode: "Call Me Crazy"
2002	American Dreams	Dionne Warwick	Episode: "Silent Night"
2003	Punk'd	Herself	Episode: "Episode #2.4"
2003	Intimate Portrait	Herself	Episode: "Ashanti"
2003	Buffy the Vampire Slayer	Lissa	Episode: "First Date"
2003	The Proud Family	Randi (voice)	Episode: "It Takes a Thief"
2004	Driven	Herself	Episode: "Episode #3.1"
2004	Style Star	Herself	Episode: "Ashanti"
2005	Las Vegas	Herself	Episode: "Magic Carpet Fred"
2006	TV Land's Top Ten	Herself	Episode: "Top Ten Musical Moments"
2006	Access Granted	Herself	Episode: "2Pac ft. T.I. & Ashanti 'Pac's Life'"
2007	HypaSpace	Herself	Episode: "Episode #6.186"
2009	Access Granted	Herself	Episode: "Plies Feat. Ashanti: Want It, Need It"
2010	The Biggest Loser	Herself	Episode: "Episode #9.16"
2013	The Chew	Herself	Episode: "Camp Chew"
2013	Army Wives	Latasha Montclair	Main Cast: Season 7
2013	Law & Order: Special Victims Unit	Herself	Episode: "Dissonant Voices"
2014	The View	Herself/Guest Co-Host	Episode: "Episode #18.43" & "#18.62"
2015	The Meredith Vieira Show	Herself/Panelist	Episode: "Episode #1.63"
2015	Unforgettable	Stella	Episode: "Behind the Beat"
2016	The Real	Herself/Guest Co-Host	Recurring Guest Co-Host: Season 3
2018	Amazingness	Herself	Episode: "Episode #1.8"
2018	RuPaul's Drag Race	Herself/Guest Judge	Episode: "Evil Twins"
2018	Steve	Herself/Panelist	Episode: "Episode #1.100" & "#1.159"
2018	Feed Me TV	Herself	Episode: "Ashanti Digs In"
2019	Unsung	Herself	Episode: "Lloyd"
2019	Dynasty	Herself	Episode: "Mother? I'm at La Mirage"
2020	To Tell the Truth	Herself/Panelist	Episode: "Ashanti, Gary Cole, Michael Ealy, Sherri Shepherd"
2020	Love & Listings	Herself	Recurring Cast: Season 2
2021	The $100,000 Pyramid	Herself/Celebrity Player	Episode: "Ana Gasteyer vs. Luke Kirby and Ashanti vs. Clay Aiken"
2022	I Can See Your Voice	Herself	Episode: "Episode #2.4"
2022	Supreme Team	Herself	Episode: "Truth & Consequences"
2025–present	Nelly & Ashanti: We Belong Together	Herself	Main Cast
2026	Not Suitable for Work	Herself	Episode: "A Birthday Party for the Whole World"

=== Theater ===
Year	Title	Role	Notes
2009	The Wiz	Dorothy	

== See also ==
- List of artists who reached number one in the United States
- List of awards and nominations received by Ashanti
