= Irv Gotti production discography =

The following list is a discography of productions by Irv Gotti, an American record producer and record executive from New York City, New York. It includes a list of songs produced, co-produced and remixed by year, artist, album and title.

== Singles produced ==
List of singles, with selected chart positions, showing year released and album name
Title	Year	Peak chart positions										Certifications	Album
Title	Year	US	US R&B	AUS	CAN	FRA	GER	IRE	NL	SWI	UK	Certifications	Album
"Shit's Real" (Mic Geronimo)	1994	—	89	—	—	—	—	—	—	—	—		The Natural
"Can I Get A..." (Jay-Z featuring Ja Rule and Amil)	1998	19	6	—	36	—	12	—	30	26	24		Vol. 2... Hard Knock Life
"Hot Spot" (Foxy Brown)	1998	91	22	—	54	—	—	—	54	—	31		Chyna Doll
"Grand Finale" (DMX featuring Ja Rule, Method Man and Nas)	1998	—	—	—	—	—	—	—	—	—	—		Belly (soundtrack)
"Holla Holla" (Ja Rule)	1999	35	11	—	15	—	—	—	—	—	—		Venni Vetti Vecci
"What's My Name?" (DMX)	1999	67	23	—	—	—	—	—	—	—	—	RIAA: Gold	...And Then There Was X
"Come Back in One Piece" (Aaliyah featuring DMX)	2000	117	36	—	—	—	—	—	59	—	—		Romeo Must Die: The Album
"Between Me and You" (Ja Rule featuring Christina Milian)	2000	11	5	—	—	—	—	—	48	—	26		Rule 3:36
"Put It on Me" (Ja Rule featuring Lil' Mo and Vita)	2000	8	2	—	—	—	—	—	7	—	—		Rule 3:36
"6 Feet Underground" (Ja Rule)	2000	—	53	—	—	—	—	—	—	—	—		Rule 3:36
"How We Roll" (Big Pun featuring Ashanti)	2001	—	53	—	—	—	—	—	—	—	—		Endangered Species
"I Cry" (Ja Rule featuring Lil' Mo)	2001	40	11	—	—	—	—	—	—	—	—		Rule 3:36
"I'm Real (Murder Remix)" (Jennifer Lopez featuring Ja Rule)	2001	1	2	3	6	3	11	13	2	6	4		J.Lo/Pain Is Love
"Livin' It Up" (Ja Rule featuring Case)	2001	6	4	6	—	32	—	20	29	—	5	BPI: Gold	Pain Is Love
"Always on Time" (Ja Rule featuring Ashanti)	2001	1	1	3	16	45	22	22	11	4	6	ARIA: Gold; BPI: Platinum	Pain Is Love
"Ain't It Funny (Murder Remix)" (Jennifer Lopez featuring Ja Rule and Caddillac Tah)	2002	1	4	9	12	—	18	—	7	7	4	ARIA: Gold	J to tha L–O! The Remixes
"What's Luv?" (Fat Joe featuring Ashanti and Ja Rule)	2002	2	3	4	12	27	10	17	7	2	4	ARIA: Gold; GLF: Gold; BPI: Platinum	Jealous Ones Still Envy (J.O.S.E.)
"Foolish" (Ashanti)	2002	1	1	6	—	62	26	14	12	15	4	ARIA: Platinum; BPI: Gold; RIAA: 2× Platinum	Ashanti
"Rainy Dayz" (Mary J. Blige featuring Ja Rule)	2002	12	8	—	—	—	58	25	13	65	17		No More Drama
"Down Ass Bitch" (Ja Rule featuring Charli Baltimore)	2002	21	8	37	—	—	—	—	55	75	91		Pain Is Love
"Down 4 U" (Irv Gotti featuring Ja Rule, Ashanti, Charli Baltimore, and Vita)	2002	6	3	—	—	—	54	22	22	43	4		Irv Gotti Presents: The Inc.
"Gangsta Lovin'" (Eve featuring Alicia Keys)	2002	2	2	4	—	20	21	15	8	6	6	ARIA: Platinum	Eve-Olution
"Happy" (Ashanti featuring Ja Rule)	2002	8	6	29	—	40	41	22	10	24	13		Ashanti
"Baby" (Ashanti)	2002	15	7	—	—	—	89	—	48	—	—		Ashanti
"Thug Lovin'" (Ja Rule featuring Bobby Brown)	2002	42	16	7	10	—	36	26	21	89	15	ARIA: Gold	The Last Temptation
"Mesmerize" (Ja Rule featuring Ashanti)	2002	2	5	5	19	66	17	19	33	79	12	ARIA: Platinum; BPI: Silver	The Last Temptation
"Rock wit U (Awww Baby)" (Ashanti)	2003	2	4	19	4	—	41	21	28	33	7	BPI: Silver	Chapter II
"Rain on Me" (Ashanti)	2003	7	2	—	27	—	70	—	—	85	19		Chapter II
"Breakup 2 Makeup" (Ashanti featuring Black Child)	2004	—	76	—	—	—	—	—	—	—	—		Chapter II
"Southside" (Lloyd featuring Ashanti)	2004	24	13	—	—	—	—	—	—	—	—		Southside
"Wonderful" (Ja Rule featuring R. Kelly and Ashanti)	2004	5	3	6	—	—	20	12	15	12	1	BPI: Silver; RIAA: Gold	R.U.L.E. and Concrete Rose
"Only U" (Ashanti)	2004	13	10	24	—	33	12	4	18	12	2	RIAA: Gold	Concrete Rose
"New York" (Ja Rule featuring Fat Joe and Jadakiss)	2004	27	14	—	—	—	—	—	—	—	—		R.U.L.E.
"Don't Let Them" (Ashanti)	2005	—	—	—	—	—	—	41	—	—	38		Concrete Rose
"Caught Up" (Ja Rule featuring Lloyd)	2005	—	65	34	—	—	—	20	—	—	20		R.U.L.E.
"Still on It" (Ashanti featuring Paul Wall & Method Man)	2005	115	55	—	—	—	—	—	—	—	—		Collectables by Ashanti
"Violent Crimes"/"Brothers" (Kanye West/featuring Charlie Wilson)	2018	27	16	40	30	167	—	33	—	—	—	BPI: Silver; RIAA: Platinum	Ye ("Violent Crimes")
"—" denotes a recording that did not chart or was not released in that territory.

== 1994 ==
=== Ca$h Money Click ===
- "4 My Click"
- "Get tha Fortune"

== 1995 ==
=== Mic Geronimo - The Natural ===
- 06. "Time to Build" (featuring Ja Rule, Jay-Z and DMX)
- 07. "Shit's Real"

== 1996 ==
=== Jay-Z - Reasonable Doubt ===
- 08. "Can I Live"
- 15. "Can't Knock the Hustle" (Fool's Paradise remix with Meli'sa Morgan)

== 1997 ==
=== Various Artists - Dangerous Ground (soundtrack) / Streets Is Watching ===
- 03. "Only a Customer" (performed by Jay-Z)

=== Mic Geronimo - Vendetta ===
- 04. "Life N Lessons" _{(produced with Lil Rob)}
- 09. "Single Life" (featuring Jay-Z) _{(produced with Lil Rob)}

== 1998 ==
=== Various Artists - Streets Is Watching ===
- 03. "Only a Customer" (performed by Jay-Z)

=== DMX - It's Dark and Hell Is Hot ===
- 01. "Intro" _{(produced with Lil Rob)}
- 12. "Crime Story" _{(produced with Lil Rob)}

=== Jay-Z - Vol. 2... Hard Knock Life / Rush Hour (soundtrack) ===
- 09. "Can I Get A..." (featuring Ja Rule and Amil) _{(produced with Lil Rob)}

=== Various Artists - Belly soundtrack ===
- 03. "Grand Finale" (performed by DMX, Ja Rule, Method Man and Nas) _{(produced with Lil Rob)}
- 09. "Story to Tell" (performed by Ja Rule)

=== DMX - Flesh of My Flesh, Blood of My Blood ===
- 05. "We Don't Give a Fuck" (featuring Jadakiss and Styles P) _{(produced with Dat Nigga Reb)}

== 1999 ==
=== Foxy Brown - Chyna Doll ===
- 04. "Hot Spot" (produced with Lil Rob)
- 14. "BWA" (featuring Mia X & Gangsta Boo) _{(produced with Lil Rob)}

=== Various Artists - Whiteboys (soundtrack) ===
- 17. "I Can Relate" (Blackchild)

=== Ja Rule - Venni Vetti Vecci ===
- 01. "The March Prelude"
- 02. "We Here Now" (featuring Black Child) _{(produced with Lil Rob)}
- 03. "World's Most Dangerous" (featuring Nemesis) _{(produced with Tyrone Fyffe and Lil Rob)}
- 04. "Let's Ride" _{(produced with Lil Rob)}
- 05. "Holla Holla" _{(produced with Tai)}
- 06. "Kill 'Em All" (featuring Jay-Z) _{(produced with Self)}
- 08. "Nigguz Theme" _{(produced with Lil Rob)}
- 09. "Suicide Freestyle" (featuring Case)
- 10. "Story to Tell" _{(produced with Lil Rob)}
- 12. "Count on Yo Nigga" _{(produced with Lil Rob)}
- 13. "It's Murda" (featuring DMX and Jay-Z) _{(produced with Ty Fyffe)}
- 14. "E-Dub and Ja" (featuring Erick Sermon) _{(produced with Erick Sermon)}
- 16. "Murda 4 Life" (featuring Memphis Bleek) _{(produced with Tai)}
- 17. "Daddy's Little Baby" (featuring Ronald Isley) _{(produced with Self)}
- 18. "Race Against Time" _{(produced with Lil Rob)}
- 19. "Only Begotten Son" _{(produced with Tyrone Fyffe and Lil Rob)}
- 20. "The Murderers" (featuring Black Child and Tah Murdah) _{(produced with DL)}

=== Memphis Bleek - Coming of Age ===
- 05. "Murda 4 Life" (featuring Ja Rule) _{(produced with Mr. Fingers)}
- 08. "You a Thug Nigga"
- 12. "My Hood to Your Hood" (featuring Beanie Sigel) _{(produced with Mr. Fingers)}

=== Cha Cha - Dear Diary ===
- 11. "wheredapaperat" (feat. Ja Rule & Memphis Bleek)

=== Ol' Dirty Bastard - Nigga Please ===
- 02. "I Can't Wait" _{(produced with Dat Nigga Reb)}
- 05. "Rollin' Wit You" _{(produced with Mr. Fingers)}
- 07. "You Don't Want to Fuck With Me" _{(produced with DL)}

=== Funkmaster Flex & Big Kap - The Tunnel ===
- 19. "Live at the Tunnel" (feat. The Murderers) _{(produced with Lil Rob)}

=== Various artists - Next Friday soundtrack ===
- 03. "We Murderers Baby" (performed by Vita and Ja Rule) _{(produced with Dat Nigga Reb)}

=== DMX - ... And Then There Was X ===
- 10. "What's My Name?" _{(produced with Self Service)}
- 17. "Angel" (featuring Regina Belle)

=== Jay-Z - Vol. 3... Life and Times of S. Carter ===
- 10. "Watch Me" (featuring Dr. Dre) _{(produced with Lil Rob)}

== 2000 ==
=== Various Artists - Bamboozled (soundtrack) ===
- 10. "Charli" (performed by Charli Baltimore) _{(produced with Styles)}

=== Various artists - Romeo Must Die soundtrack ===
- 02. "Come Back in One Piece" (performed by Aaliyah and DMX) _{(produced with Lil Rob)}
- 12. "Somebody's Gonna Die Tonight" (performed by Dave Bing and Lil' Mo) _{(produced with Lil Rob)}

=== DJ Clue - Backstage: Music Inspired by the Film ===
- 17. "Crime Life" (feat. Memphis Bleek, Ja Rule & Lil Cease) _{(produced with DB)}

=== Canibus - 2000 B.C. (Before Can-I-Bus) ===
- 10. "Lost @ "C"" _{(produced with Taiwan Green)}

=== Do or Die - Victory ===
- 14. "Murderers, Pimps & Thugs" (featuring Ja Rule)

=== Ja Rule - Rule 3:36 ===
- 01. "Intro" _{(produced with Lil Rob)}
- 02. "Watching Me" _{(produced with Lil Rob)}
- 03. "Between Me and You" (featuring Christina Milian) _{(produced with Lil Rob)}
- 04. "Put It on Me" (featuring Vita) _{(produced with Tru Stylze)}
- 05. "6 Feet Underground" _{(produced with Self Service)}
- 06. "Love Me, Hate Me" _{(produced with Lil Rob and Ja Rule)}
- 07. "Die" (featuring Tah Murdah, Black Child and Dave Bing) _{(produced with Ty Fyffe)}
- 08. "Fuck You" (featuring 01 and Vita) _{(produced with Dat Nigga Reb)}
- 09. "I'll Fuck U Girl (Skit)"
- 10. "Grey Box (Skit)"
- 11. "Extasy" (featuring Tah Murdah, Black Child and Jayo Felony) _{(produced with Lil Rob)}
- 12. "It's Your Life" (featuring Shade Sheist) _{(produced with Damizza)}
- 13. "I Cry" (featuring Lil' Mo) _{(produced with Lil Rob)}
- 14. "One of Us" _{(produced with Lil Rob)}
- 15. "Chris Black (Skit)"
- 16. "The Rule Won't Die" _{(produced with Lil Rob)}

=== Funkmaster Flex - The Mix Tape, Vol. IV ===
- 01. "Do You" (feat. DMX)
- 15. "Feelin' the Hate" (feat. The Murderers)

== 2001 ==
=== Mil - Street Scripture ===
- 03. "Problems" (feat. Petey Pablo) _{(produced with Mr. Fingerz)}

=== Various artists - Exit Wounds: The Album ===
- 02. "State to State" (performed by Black Child & Ja Rule) _{(produced with Mr. Fingerz)}

=== Big Pun - Endangered Species ===
- 05. "How We Roll" (featuring Ashanti) _{(produced with Tru Stylez)}

=== Mary J. Blige - No More Drama ===
- 07. "Rainy Dayz" (feat. Ja Rule)

=== Ja Rule - Pain Is Love ===
- 02. "Dial M for Murder" _{(produced with Ty Fyffe)}
- 03. "Livin' It Up" (featuring Case) _{(produced with Lil Rob)}
- 04. "The Inc." (featuring Caddillac Tah, Black Child & Ashanti)
- 05. "Always on Time" (featuring Ashanti)
- 06. "Down Ass Bitch" (featuring Charli Baltimore)
- 07. "Never Again"
- 08. "Worldwide Gangsta" (featuring Caddillac Tah, Black Child, Boo & Gotti)
- 10. "I'm Real (Murder Remix)" (featuring Jennifer Lopez)
- 11. "Smokin' & Ridin'" (featuring Jodie Mack & O-1)
- 12. "X" (featuring Missy Elliott & Tweet) ^{(to be found on Violator: The Album, V2.0)}
- 14. "Lost Little Girl"
- 15. "So Much Pain" (featuring 2Pac) _{(produced with Lil Rob)}
- 16. "Pain Is Love"

=== Krayzie Bone - Thug On Da Line'' ===
- 6. "Da Thugs"

=== Christina Milian - N/A ===
- "AM to PM (Irv Gotti's Gutta Remix)"

=== Fat Joe - Jealous Ones Still Envy (J.O.S.E.) ===
- 04. "Opposites Attract (What They Like)" (featuring Remy Ma) _{(produced with Self Service)}
- 09. "What's Luv?" (featuring Ja Rule & Ashanti) _{(produced with Chink Santana)}

=== Ruff Ryders - Ryde or Die Vol. 3: In the "R" We Trust ===
- 04. "U, Me & She" (performed by Eve)

== 2002 ==
=== Nivea - N/A ===
- "Don't Mess With My Radio (Irv Remix) [feat. Cadillac Tah]

=== Beenie Man - Tropical Storm ===
- 04. "Real Gangsta" _{(produced with Chink Santana)}

=== Ashanti - Ashanti ===
- 01. "Intro" _{(produced with 7 Aurelius and Chink Santana)}
- 02. "Foolish" _{(produced with 7 Aurelius)}
- 03. "Happy" _{(produced with Chink Santana)}
- 04. "Leaving (Always on Time Part II)" (featuring Ja Rule) _{(produced with 7 Aurelius)}
- 06. "Call" _{(produced with 7 Aurelius)}
- 07. "Scared" (featuring Irv Gotti) _{(produced with Chink Santana)}
- 08. "Rescue" _{(produced with 7 Aurelius)}
- 09. "Baby" _{(produced with 7 Aurelius and Chink Santana)}
- 10. "VooDoo" _{(produced with 7 Aurelius)}
- 11. "Movies" _{(produced with 7 Aurelius, Reggie Wright, and Jared Thomas)}
- 13. "Over" _{(produced with Chink Santana)}
- 14. "Unfoolish" (featuring The Notorious B.I.G.) _{(produced with 7 Aurelius)}
- 16. "Dreams" _{(produced with 7 Aurelius)}

=== N.O.R.E. - God's Favorite ===
- 08. "Live My Life" (featuring Ja Rule)

=== Eve - Eve-Olution ===
- 03. "Gangsta Lovin'" (featuring Alicia Keys) _{(produced with 7 Aurelius)}
- 04. "Irresistible Chick" _{(produced with 7 Aurelius)}
- 18. "U, Me & She"

=== Toni Braxton - More Than a Woman ===
- 09. "Me & My Boyfriend"

=== Fat Joe - Loyalty ===
- 06. "Turn Me On" (featuring Ronda Blackwell) _{(produced with Chink Santana)}

=== Ja Rule - The Last Temptation ===
- 02. "Thug Lovin'" (featuring Bobby Brown) _{(produced with Chink Santana)}
- 03. "Mesmerize" (featuring Ashanti) _{(produced with Chink Santana)}
- 05. "The Pledge (Remix)" (featuring Ashanti, Nas & 2Pac) _{(produced with 7 Aurelius)}
- 06. "Murder Reigns" (featuring Celeste Scalone) _{(produced with 7 Aurelius)}
- 07. "Last Temptation" (featuring Charli Baltimore) _{(produced with Chink Santana)}
- 08. "Murder Me" (featuring Caddillac Tah & Alexi) _{(produced with Chink Santana)}
- 09. "The Warning" _{(produced with Chink Santana)}
- 10. "Connected" (featuring Eastwood & Crooked I) _{(produced with Chink Santana)}
- 11. "Emerica" (featuring Young Life & Chink Santana) _{(produced with Chink Santana)}
- 12. "Rock Star" _{(produced with Chink Santana)}

== 2003 ==
=== Various artists - Dysfunktional Family soundtrack ===
- 08. "All My" (performed by Ashanti) _{(produced with China Black)}

=== Ruben Studdard - Soulful ===
- 05. "What is Sexy" (featuring Fat Joe)

=== Ja Rule - Blood In My Eye ===
- 01. "Murder Intro"
- 02. "The Life" (featuring Hussein Fatal, Cadillac Tah, James Gotti) _{(produced with Jimi Kendrix)}
- 03. "Clap Back" _{(produced with Scott Storch)}
- 04. "The Crown" (featuring Sizzla) _{(produced with Chink Santana)}
- 06. "Things Gon' Change" (featuring Black Child, Young Merc, D.O. Cannons) _{(produced with Jimi Kendrix)}
- 07. "Always Time" _{(produced with Jimi Kendrix)}
- 09. "N***** & B******"
- 10. "The I.N.C. Is Back" (featuring Shadow, Sekou 720, Black Child)
- 12. "Blood In My Eye" (featuring Hussein Fatal) _{(produced with Jimi Kendrix)}
- 13. "It's Murda Freestyle" (featuring Hussein Fatal)
- 14. "The Wrap Freestyle" (featuring Hussein Fatal)

== 2004 ==
=== Lloyd - Southside ===
- 01. "ATL Tales / Ride Wit Me" (featuring Ja Rule) _{(produced with Jimi Kendrix)}
- 03. "Southside" (featuring Ashanti) _{(produced with Wirlie Morris)}
- 04. "Feelin You" _{(produced with Chink Santana)}
- 05. "Take It Low" _{(produced with Demi-Doc)}
- 06. "Hustler" (featuring Chink Santana) _{(produced with Chink Santana)}
- 07. "My Life" _{(produced with Demi-Doc)}
- 10. "Feels So Right" _{(produced with Demi-Doc)}
- 15. "Yesterday" _{(produced with Artie Green)}

=== Shyne - Godfather Buried Alive ===
- 08. "Jimmy Choo" (featuring Ashanti)

=== Ja Rule - R.U.L.E. ===
- 02. "Last of The Mohicans" (featuring Black Child) _{(produced with Chink Santana)}
- 03. "Wonderful" (featuring R. Kelly & Ashanti) _{(produced with Jimi Kendrix)}
- 04. "What's My Name" (featuring Ashanti) _{(produced with Jimi Kendrix)}
- 05. "New York" (featuring Fat Joe & Jadakiss) _{(produced with Cool & Dre)}
- 07. "The Manual" _{(produced with Jimi Kendrix and Francion Corbett)}
- 08. "Get It Started" (featuring Claudette Ortiz) _{(produced with Jimi Kendrix)}
- 09. "R.U.L.E." _{(produced with Jimi Kendrix)}
- 11. "Caught Up" (featuring Lloyd) _{(produced with Jimi Kendrix and Boogz)}
- 12. "Gun Talk" (featuring Black Child) _{(produced with Chink Santana)}
- 13. "Never Thought" _{(produced with Jimi Kendrix)}
- 14. "Life Goes On" (featuring Trick Daddy & Chink Santana) _{(produced with Chink Santana)}
- 16. "Where I'm From" (featuring Lloyd) _{(produced with Chink Santana)}
- 17. "Bout My Business" (featuring Caddillac Tah, Black Child & Young Merc) _{(produced with DJ Twinz)}
- 18. "Passion" _{(produced with Jimi Kendrix and Boogz)}

=== Ashanti - Concrete Rose ===
- 01. Concrete Rose" (Intro) _{(produced with 7 Aurelius)}
- 02. "Still Down" (featuring T.I.) _{(produced with Malcolm Flythe and Jimi Kendrix)}
- 03. "Message to the Fans" (Skit) _{(produced with 7 Aurelius)}
- 04. "Only U" _{(produced with 7 Aurelius)}
- 05. "Focus" _{(produced with 7 Aurelius)}
- 06. "Don't Let Them" _{(produced with Demi-Doc)}
- 07. "Love Again" _{(produced with 7 Aurelius)}
- 08. "Take Me Tonight" (featuring Lloyd) _{(produced with Jimi Kendrix)}
- 09. "U" _{(produced with 7 Aurelius)}
- 10. "Every Lil' Thing" _{(produced with 7 Aurelius)}
- 11. "Turn It Up" (featuring Ja Rule) _{(produced with Jimi Kendrix)}
- 13. " Hot" _{(produced with Demi-Doc and Chink Santana)}
- 14. "Don't Leave Me Alone" (featuring 7 Aurelius) _{(produced with 7 Aurelius)}
- 16. "Freedom" _{(produced with Demi-Doc)}
- 17. "Wonderful" (Remix) (featuring Ja Rule & R. Kelly) _{(produced with Jimi Kendrix)}

== 2005 ==
=== Memphis Bleek - 534 ===
- 04. "Infatuated" (Feat. Boxie) _{(produced with Demi-Doc)}

== 2008 ==
=== Bang Bang Boogie - The Machine, Vol. 1 ===
- 4. "Murdergram" _{(produced with Ty Fyffe)}

=== The Game - LAX ===
- 23. "Nice" {Bonus Track}

== 2012 ==
=== Lil B - Glassface ===
- 02. "Mr. Glassface" _{(produced with Ty Fyffe)}

== 2018 ==
=== Kanye West - Ye ===
- 07. "Violent Crimes" _{(produced with 7 Aurelius and Kanye West)}
