= Only U =

2004 single by Ashanti

Single by Ashanti

from the album Concrete Rose
- B-side: "Turn It Up"
- Released: October 18, 2004
- Studio: C.H. (New York City); Armoury (Vancouver)
- Genre: Rock; R&B
- Length: 3:06
- Label: The Inc.
- Songwriters: Ashanti Douglas; Seven Aurelius; Irving Lorenzo
- Producers: Seven Aurelius; Irv Gotti

Ashanti singles chronology
"Wonderful" (2004)	"Only U" (2004)	"Don't Let Them" (2005)

Audio sample
- "Only U": file; help

Music video
- "Only U" on YouTube

"Only U" is a song by American singer Ashanti from her third studio album, Concrete Rose (2004). The song's introduction uses a sample of Club Nouveau's 1986 song "Why You Treat Me So Bad". "Only U" is a rock-tinged song that finds Ashanti in love and willing to do anything to be with the one she loves, no matter the cost.

Released on October 18, 2004, as the album's lead single, the track reached number 13 on the US Billboard Hot 100 in January 2005. Internationally, it peaked at number two in the United Kingdom and number four in Ireland, becoming Ashanti's most successful single in both countries. The song received generally favorable reviews from music critics, with most praising its sensual lyrics, guitar riff and her vocal performance.

== Background and release ==
After her successful second studio album Chapter II (2003), which topped the Billboard 200 chart and was certified Platinum, spawned two hit singles, "Rock wit U (Awww Baby)" and "Rain on Me", and earned her three Grammy nominations, Ashanti released her first Christmas album called Ashanti's Christmas in 2003. However, the album received overwhelming negative reviews and did not provide much success on the charts.

Later in September 2004, Ashanti collaborated with Ja Rule and R. Kelly on the track "Wonderful" for Rule's sixth studio album R.U.L.E. The song was a success, topping the UK Singles Chart and peaking inside the top 10 in the U.S., Australia and New Zealand, as well as reaching the top 20 in Ireland, Switzerland, Denmark, the Netherlands, and Germany. A month later, on October 18, 2004, "Only U" was serviced to US urban radio, and on October 26, the song was released through iTunes and Amazon as the lead single from Ashanti's third studio album, Concrete Rose (2004). The song was released to radio stations on January 11, 2005.

=== Remix ===
The official remix was included on Ashanti's 2005 compilation album Collectables by Ashanti, and features Caddillac Tah, Young Merc, Ja Rule, and Black Child. There is a second official remix that replaces Caddillac Tah and Young Merc with Dipset rappers Cam'ron and Juelz Santana.

== Composition and lyrics ==
"Only U" was written by Ashanti, Seven Aurelius, and Irv Gotti, with production handled by the latter two. "Only U" is a rock-tinged song. The song's introduction uses a sample of Club Nouveau's 1986 song "Why You Treat Me So Bad", followed by a guitar riff, taken from the song "Presence" by Aurelius. Lyrically, "Only U" has Ashanti imagining a man providing sexual pleasure for her, finding herself always standing by his side or looking for reasons to be close to him, acting out of character and falling for him more with each day.

"Oh I can't wait to get next to you/ Oh I just can't leave you alone/ Boy you got me doing things that I would never do," she sings. In the chorus, she emphasizes that the guy is only one who makes her feel in love and turned on, "Only u can make me feel and only u can take me there," she chants.

== Critical reception ==
"Only U" received generally favorable reviews from music critics. Hattie Collins of The Guardian called it "a deliciously dark song." Chuck Arnold of People Magazine wrote that "the rock-edged 'Only U,' show Ashanti truly blossoming." Khalil Regarty of The Age called it "a No. 1-single-by-numbers in which Aurelius' Linkin Park-style guitar riffs sit atop a shuffling beat the Trackmasters or the Neptunes could have put their hands to." Low Key of MV Remix wrote that "'Only U' finds Ashanti taking a risk with a rock-influenced sound, which thankfully works out well. Ashanti sounds better than ever over Seven Aurelius smashing guitar riffs and ambient sirens, making for one of her best efforts yet." Steve Jones of USA Today praised the song for having "engaging beats and airy vocals," writing that "it works well."

"The Bland Is Out There" review was positive, writing that, "The beat complements Ashanti's slight voice It's the one single so far which has fit right into her range. There isn't any high-pitched screaming or an excess of 'baby's' for her to sing. 'Only U' is...worth a listen." Kelefa Sanneh of The New York Times was mixed, writing that the song "revolves around a corroded keyboard line that sounds distinctly menacing - that is, until Ashanti arrives, singing, 'Ooh, I can't wait to get next to you'." Sal Cinquemani of Slant Magazine called it a "promising edgy, rock-leaning" song.

== Chart performance ==
"Only U" proved to be successful on the charts. In the United States, the song debuted at number 63 on the Billboard Hot 100 chart issue dated November 24, 2004, and peaked at number 13 on the chart issue dated January 22, 2005. In March 2005, the single was certified gold. The song was also a success on the Hot R&B/Hip-Hop Singles & Tracks chart, peaking at number 10, while it also peaked at number eight on the Rhythmic Top 40 chart and number 19 on the Mainstream Top 40 chart. In the United Kingdom, the song was even more successful, debuting at number two, becoming her most successful solo single in the United Kingdom. On the Irish Singles Chart, the song debuted and peaked at number four on the chart issue dated January 27, 2005.

The song also reached top-twenty positions in several countries. In New Zealand, "Only U" debuted at number 31, on February 7, 2005, and peaked at number 14, on February 14, 2005. In Switzerland, the song was her best solo single on the charts, peaking at number 12 on the Swiss Singles Chart. In Germany, the song also peaked at number 12, on the German Singles Chart. In the Flanders region of Belgium, the song debuted at number 36 before peaking at number 17 in its second week. In the Netherlands, the single debuted and peaked at number 18 on the Dutch Top 40 chart. Elsewhere, the song attained top-forty positions. In the Wallonia region of Belgium, the song debuted at number 38 before climbing to its peak of number 23 in its second week. In Australia, the song debuted and peaked at number 24 on the ARIA Singles Chart. In Austria, the song debuted at number 41, while it peaked at number 30, in its fourth week. In France, the song debuted and peaked at number 33 on the SNEP chart week of March 26, 2005.

== Music videos ==
There are two official versions of the video, both directed by Hype Williams and shot in Vancouver and Mexico City. It is notable for making use of a blue-hue effect in numerous shots with overt noir and neo-noir influences in many shots. The first version is the original video (which has an alternate version itself) and the second version is the Dance Version, which was only aired on BET.

=== Original version ===
The original version is shot in widescreen format but the slots that are normally left black at the top and bottom of the screen were replaced with upside down or reversed images of the main shot in the middle of the screen, which flickered back and forth to give the illusion that two scenes were playing at once. The alternate version had the scenes shown in regular widescreen format with the shots and the top and bottom of the screen plain black. It opens with a Blade Runner-inspired environment and imagery of Ashanti's face projected onto a skyscraper—similar to a scene in Blade Runner. In addition, there is a scene where she is sitting down on a seat while smoking as she appears to be watching something through a projector—again, a shot similar to that of a scene in Blade Runner. The rest of the video features Ashanti in various situations, posing and wearing a variety of outfits. In one scene, Ashanti is in the shower and in another she is inside a cocoon-like lamp as air gushes from beneath, creating a vacuum effect—reminiscent of the scene in Blade Runner where Zhora (Joanna Cassidy) goes to dry her hair inside a clear, fishbowl-like dryer. The video ends with her and a group of female dancers performing the song in concert. Bottles of Herbal Essences hair products are seen during the shower scene as Ashanti was the then-new spokesperson for the haircare company. Seven Aurelius, who co-wrote and produced the song, makes a guest appearance at the beginning and at the end of the video playing the guitar.

=== Dance version ===
The "Dance Version" of the video consisted of the dance scene that is also shown at the end of the original video, with Ashanti and the back-up dancers dancing throughout the entire video. Seven Aurelius makes a cameo appearance in this version as well at the beginning and at the end of the video as the guitar player. Director Hype Williams featured his signature style of widescreen format in this version of the video also, except the slots that are normally left blank at the top and bottom of the screen were replaced with upside down or reversed images of the main shot in the middle of the screen.

== Track listings ==
US 12-inch single

A1. "Only U" (clean)
A2. "Only U" (instrumental)
A3. "Only U" (a cappella)
B1. "Turn It Up" (featuring Ja Rule—clean)
B2. "Turn It Up" (featuring Ja Rule—main)
B3. "Turn It Up" (featuring Ja Rule—instrumental)

UK 12-inch single

A1. "Only U" – 3:07
B1. "Turn It Up" (radio edit featuring Ja Rule) – 4:21
B2. "Spend the Night" – 3:30

UK CD1

1. "Only U" – 3:07
2. "Turn It Up" (radio edit featuring Ja Rule) – 4:21
3. "Spend the Night" – 3:30
4. "Only U" (video)

UK CD2 and European CD single

1. "Only U" – 3:07
2. "Turn It Up" (radio edit featuring Ja Rule) – 4:21

French CD single

1. "Only U"
2. "Wonderful" (remix with Ja Rule and R. Kelly)

Australian CD single

1. "Only U"
2. "Turn It Up" (featuring Ja Rule)
3. "Only U" (Kelly G's club mix)
4. "Only U" (video)

Japanese CD single

1. "Only U" (radio edit)
2. "Only U" (remix)
3. "Only U" (instrumental)

== Charts ==
=== Weekly charts ===
Chart (2005)	Peak position
Australia (ARIA)	24
Australian Urban (ARIA)	7
Austria (Ö3 Austria Top 40)	30
Belgium (Ultratop 50 Flanders)	17
Belgium (Ultratop 50 Wallonia)	23
Canada CHR/Pop Top 30 (Radio & Records)	18
Croatia (HRT)	9
Europe (European Hot 100 Singles)	4
France (SNEP)	33
Germany (GfK)	12
Ireland (IRMA)	4
Netherlands (Dutch Top 40)	18
Netherlands (Single Top 100)	18
New Zealand (Recorded Music NZ)	14
Scottish Singles Sales (Official Charts)	3
Sweden (Sverigetopplistan)	43
Switzerland (Schweizer Hitparade)	12
UK Singles (Official Charts)	2
UK Hip Hop/R&B (Official Charts)	1
US Billboard Hot 100	13
US Hot R&B/Hip-Hop Songs (Billboard)	10
US Pop Airplay (Billboard)	19
US Rhythmic Airplay (Billboard)	8

=== Year-end charts ===
Chart (2005)	Position
Belgium (Ultratop 50 Flanders)	87
Europe (European Hot 100 Singles)	88
Switzerland (Schweizer Hitparade)	75
UK Singles (OCC)	86
US Hot R&B/Hip-Hop Songs (Billboard)	59
US Rhythmic Top 40 (Billboard)	56

== Certifications ==
Region	Certification	Certified units/sales
United Kingdom (BPI)	Silver	200,000^{‡}
United States (RIAA)	Gold	500,000^{*}
^{*} Sales figures based on certification alone.^{‡} Sales+streaming figures based on certification alone.

== Release history ==
Region	Date	Format(s)	Label(s)	Ref.
United States	October 18, 2004	Urban radio	The Inc.	
United States	October 26, 2004	Digital download	The Inc.	
Japan	December 1, 2004	CD	The Inc.	
United States	January 11, 2005	Contemporary hit radio	The Inc.	
Australia	January 17, 2005	CD	The Inc.	
United Kingdom	January 24, 2005	12-inch vinyl; CD	The Inc.	

== "Split (Only U)" ==
"Split (Only U)"

Single by Tiësto and the Chainsmokers

from the album Collide (Original Motion Picture Soundtrack)
- Released: August 31, 2015
- Recorded: 2014/15
- Length: 5:06
- Label: Musical Freedom; Spinnin'
- Songwriters: Marcus Vest; Irving Domingo Lorenzo Jr.; Tijs Verwest; Alexander Pall; Andrew Taggart
- Producers: 7 Aurelius; Irv Gotti; Tiësto; the Chainsmokers

Tiësto singles chronology
"The Only Way Is Up" (2015)	"Split (Only U)" (2015)	"Chemicals" (2015)

The Chainsmokers singles chronology
"Waterbed" (2015)	"Split (Only U)" (2015)	"Until You Were Gone" (2015)

"Split (Only U)" is a song by Dutch disc jockey and producer Tiësto and American disc jockeys and producers the Chainsmokers. It was released on August 31, 2015, in the Netherlands. The song is included in the soundtrack of the 2016 action movie, Collide.

=== Background ===
In the track, Tiësto and the Chainsmokers used a sample of "Only U". The track was premiered during Tiësto's set at Ultra Europe 2015 in Split, Croatia. The title of the track comes from the name of the city.

=== Reviews ===
Fabien Dori from French webmedia Guettapen praises the track that he considered as "excellent", despite the fact that he notices a second part of the track with a "too offensive" sound of the synthesizers.

=== Music video ===
The music video premiered on Spinnin' Records' official YouTube Channel on September 3, 2015. The music video was directed by Joe Zohar and produced by Moving Box Studios. The music video starts with the Chainsmokers waking up after a party in their hotel room of Las Vegas. They receive a scoffer Snapchat message from Tiësto and decide to get revenge. They decide to kidnap him while he is producing music in his room. With a bag on his head, they bring him out of Las Vegas to kill him in the desert after that the prisoner digs his own tomb. Later, for the night, the duo guest two girls in their room to spend the night together. But, they die after a retaliation of the new walking dead.

=== Track listings ===
Digital download (MF132)

1. "Split (Only U)" – 5:06

2017 translucent blue 7-inch vinyl

1. "Split (Only You)" (extended mix) – 5:06
2. "Split (Only You)" (radio edit) – 4:18

=== Charts ===
Chart (2015)	Peak position
Belgium Dance (Ultratop Wallonia)	24
France (SNEP)	184

== In popular culture ==
The song was sampled by Playboi Carti for the track "Cocaine Nose" on his 2025 album Music.
