= Collectables by Ashanti =

Remix album by Ashanti
- Released: December 6, 2005
- Recorded: 2003–2005
- Genre: R&B
- Length: 40:27
- Label: Murder Inc.; Def Jam

Ashanti chronology
Concrete Rose (2004)	Collectables by Ashanti (2005)	Can't Stop (2006)

Singles from Collectables
- 1. "Still on It" Released: November 7, 2005

Collectables by Ashanti is a remix compilation album by American singer Ashanti. It was released by Murder Inc. and Def Jam on December 6, 2005. The album, which consists of six remixes of past singles and four new tracks, was the last Murder Inc. release to be distributed by Def Jam. Collectables by Ashanti had a parental advisory, but a "clean" version was also released.

== Critical reception ==
Professional ratings
Review scores
Source	Rating
AllMusic	3/5 stars

Collectables by Ashanti elicited a mixed reaction from music critics upon its release. AllMusic editor Andy Kellman was skeptical of the album, noting that it looks "illegit". He went on to call the album "a lukewarm scramble of some of her biggest singles", also commenting that casual fans would be disappointed by the record but awarding the album three stars nonetheless and commending "Still on It" for being "ruggedly sweet" and "I Love You" for being "drama-free."

== Commercial performance ==
The album debuted and peaked at number 59 on the US Billboard 200. It became Ashanti's fourth album to reach the Top 10 on Billboard's Top R&B/Hip-Hop Albums chart, peaking at number 10. "Still on It", the only single released from the album, was a commercial disappointment, peaking at number 55 on the Hot R&B/Hip Hop Songs chart and failing to enter the Hot 100 altogether.

== Track listing ==
Collectables by Ashanti track listing
No.	Title	Writer(s)	Producer(s)	Length
1.	"Still on It" (featuring Paul Wall and Method Man)	Ashanti Douglas; Irving Lorenzo, Jr.; M. McGregor; Paul Slayton; Clifford Smith; Tyrone Kelse	Irv Gotti; Arizona Slim	3:49
2.	"Only U" (Remix featuring Caddillac Tah, Merce, Ja Rule and Black Child)	Douglas; Lorenzo; Marcus Vest	Gotti; Seven Aurelius	4:12
3.	"I Love You"	Douglas; Lorenzo; Kendred T. Smith; B. Attmore	Gotti; Jimi Kendrix	4:22
4.	"Rain on Me" (Remix featuring Ja Rule, Charli Baltimore and Hussein Fatal)	Douglas; Lorenzo; Andre Parker; Jeffrey Atkins; Bruce Washington; Tiffany Lane Jarmon; Burt Bacharach; Hal David	Gotti; Chink Santana	5:15
5.	"Still Down" (Remix featuring Caddillac Tah)	Douglas; Lorenzo; Tiheem Crocker; Samuel Barnes; Jean-Claude Olivier; Robin Mays; Nasir Jones; Malcolm Flythe; Inga D. Marchand; Dave Atkinson; Cory McKay; C. Harris; Anthony Cruz	Gotti; Lil Rob	4:36
6.	"Show You"	Douglas; Lorenzo; Parker	Gotti; Santana	3:30
7.	"I Found It in You"	Brian P. George; Curtis T. Bedeau; Full Force; Gerard Charles; Hugh L. Clarke; Larry Troutman; Lucien J. George; Shelene Thomas; Sherrod Barnes; Shirley Murdock	Gotti; Full Force	3:36
8.	"Breakup 2 Makeup" (Remix featuring Black Child)	Douglas; Lorenzo; Parker; James Brown; Christopher Wallace; Fred Wesley; Roy Charles Hammond	Gotti; Santana	3:44
9.	"Rock wit U (Awww Baby)" (Remix)	Douglas; Lorenzo; Parker	Gotti; Santana	3:52
10.	"Focus" (Remix featuring Free)	Douglas; Lorenzo; Vest; Marie Wright; Jerry Barnes; Selan Lerner	Gotti; Seven Aurelius	3:27
Total length:				40:27

Samples credits

- "Breakup 2 Makeup (Remix)" contains samples of "Hot Pants" by James Brown and "Impeach the President" by The Honey Drippers and an interpolation of "Just Playing" by The Notorious B.I.G.

== Charts ==
Weekly chart performance for Collectables by Ashanti
Chart (2005)	Peak position
Japanese Albums (Oricon)	155
US Billboard 200	59
US Top R&B/Hip-Hop Albums (Billboard)	10

== Release history ==
Collectables by Ashanti release history
Region	Date	Format	Label	Ref(s)
Various	December 6, 2005	CD; digital download	Murder Inc.; Def Jam	
