= Real Life Fantasy =

Single by Ja Rule featuring Anita Louise

from the album Pain Is Love 2
- Released: December 13, 2011
- Recorded: 2011
- Genre: Hip-hop; R&B
- Length: 3:39
- Label: Mpire Music Group, Fontana Distribution
- Songwriters: Jeffrey Atkins, Marcus Vest, J Angel
- Producers: 7 Aurelius, Roc The Producer

Ja Rule singles chronology
"Fly" (2009)	"Real Life Fantasy" (2011)	"She Tried (Remix)" (2013)

"Real Life Fantasy", abbreviated occasionally as "R.L.F.", is the first official single from Ja Rule's seventh studio album, Pain Is Love 2. The original song samples "Bohemian Rhapsody" by Queen but the final album version does not, this is because the sample was denied. The song was released on December 13, 2011.

Three versions of this song were made; the first one was said to be only 30% complete and the other was just a promo. The final version premiered on November 11, 2011, on Ja Rule's SoundCloud the Queen sample was omitted from this version.

== Music video ==
The music video for "Real Life Fantasy" was filmed in May 2011. The song's music video was directed by Hype Williams, who also directed many of Ja Rule's previous videos, such as "Holla Holla", "Murda 4 Life", "Daddy's Little Baby", "How Many Wanna Die", "Between Me and You", "Put It On Me", " Body" and "Wonderful". It was released on February 1, 2012 on WorldStarHipHop.com and was viewed over 3 million times in the first 24 hours.

== Track listing ==
Digital download

1. "Real Life Fantasy" (featuring Anita Louise) – 3:38
