= Concrete Rose =

2004 studio album by Ashanti

Studio album by Ashanti
- Released: December 14, 2004
- Studios: The Hit Factory (New York, NY); C.H. Studios (New York, NY); Armoury Studios (Vancouver, BC); The Enterprise (Burbank, CA)
- Genre: R&B
- Length: 54:48
- Labels: The Inc.; Def Jam
- Producers: Ashanti Douglas (also exec.); Irv Gotti (also exec.); Seven Aurelius (also exec.); Chink Santana; Malcolm Flythe; Jimi Kendrix; Demetrius McGhee

Ashanti chronology
Ashanti's Christmas (2003)	Concrete Rose (2004)	Collectables by Ashanti (2005)

Singles from Concrete Rose
- 1. "Only U" Released: October 26, 2004; 2. "Don't Let Them" Released: April 5, 2005

Concrete Rose is the fourth studio album by American singer Ashanti, released on December 14, 2004, by The Inc. Records and Def Jam Recordings. In addition to working with frequent collaborators Irv Gotti, Chink Santana, and 7 Aurelius, Ashanti also enlisted new collaborators Malcolm Flythe, Jimi Kendrix, and Demi-Doc, to assist. The album features guest appearances from rappers T.I., Ja Rule, and Lloyd.

The album debuted at number seven on the US Billboard 200 in the United States, with first-week sales of 254,000 units. Outside the United States, the album was less successful, with its strongest ranking being in the top 20 in Japan and the top 30 of the UK Albums Chart. Critical reception to the project was mixed, with most deeming the album unoriginal. Nonetheless, the album did receive a platinum certification from the Recording Industry Association of America (RIAA), and gained gold status in Japan and the United Kingdom.

Concrete Rose was preceded by lead single "Only U", which received positive reviews and reached the top-twenty in several countries. The album and its promotion was vastly overshadowed by the legal troubles that faced The Inc. and Gotti, who was arrested on money laundering charges only a month after Concrete Rose's release. As a result, Def Jam severed ties with The Inc. in May 2005, and refused to promote the album's second single "Don't Let Them", which only charted moderately in Ireland and the United Kingdom.

== Background ==
Following the success of her sophomore studio album Chapter II, Ashanti confirmed in November 2003 that she had begun planning her third studio album, due to be out in mid-2004. In February 2004, Ashanti said the album had "a new sound, a new flavor", and said she wanted "to touch on more topics that I didn't touch on with the first and the second record." She also confirmed that she had already recorded three songs for the album. By July, Ashanti confirmed she had already finished the record, and planned its release for November.

The album's title was inspired by The Rose That Grew from Concrete, a poetry collection of poetry written between 1989 and 1991 by Tupac Shakur. Ashanti explained that Concrete Rose serves as a metaphor for blending musical styles: when people think of hip-hop, they often imagine something gritty, raw, and "like concrete," while R&B suggests something smooth, sensual, and soft, like a rose. Because her music combines both hip-hop and R&B, she felt the title Concrete Rose captured that balance.

== Singles and promotion ==
The song "Turn It Up", featuring rapper Ja Rule, was initially released as the lead single off the album. However, it was downscaled to a buzz single after The Inc. decided to release "Only U" as Concrete Rose's lead single instead. The song, released on October 26, 2004, reached the top ten of several countries, including Ireland (#4), Japan (#), and the United Kingdom (#2); the song also reached the top twenty in Germany (#12), New Zealand (#14), Switzerland (#12), and the United States (#13).

The album was largely overshadowed by the legal issues surrounding Murder Inc./The Inc. and its head, Irv Gotti. In January 2003, during recording of Chapter II, the offices Murder Inc. were raided during an investigation into Gotti's ties to gangster Kenneth McGriff. In November, Murder Inc. changed its name to The Inc., in an attempt to distance the company from its several controversies. Between November 2004 and January 2005, Gotti, McGriff, and several employees and associates of The Inc. were arrested on charges of money laundering, racketeering, and murder, regarding to the killing of rapper E-Money Bags. In April 2005, Ashanti chose "Don't Let Them" to be the second single from the album. The single failed to chart in the United States; however, charted moderately well in Ireland (#41) and the United Kingdom (#38).

== Critical reception ==
Professional ratings
Aggregate scores
Source	Rating
Metacritic	47/100
Review scores
Source	Rating
AllMusic	2.5/5 stars
Blender	2/5 stars
Entertainment Weekly	C−
The Guardian	2/5 stars
Los Angeles Times	1.5/4 stars
Now	2/5 stars
PopMatters	5/10
Rolling Stone	2/5 stars
Slant Magazine	2/5 stars
USA Today	2.5/4 stars

Concrete Rose received mixed reviews from music critics. At Metacritic, which assigns a normalized rating out of 100 to reviews from mainstream critics, the album received an average score of 47, based on 10 reviews, which indicates "mixed or average" reviews. Andy Kellman from Allmusic found that "disregarding the ill-suited standards, an Ashanti album is always good for a handful of strong singles, as Concrete Rose helps indicate [...] it's no better or worse than her 2002 debut or 2003's Chapter II, with the standout singles, decent album cuts, and filler fluff provided in equal doses." USA Today journalist Steve Jones found that with Concrete Rose Ashanti "sticks closely to her usual formula of engaging beats and airy vocals [...] Still, she is consistent enough to make this Rose bloom full time." Nicholas Tayor from PopMatters called the album "a decent, 54-minute collection of mostly mid-tempo tracks by a decent R&B singer." Billboard noted that "a more confident-sounding Ashanti is onboard for her third time out. Powered by sensual lead single "Only You," Concrete Rose contains several other equally rhythmic jams."

Hattie Collins, writing for The Guardian, found that "Ashanti doesn't stray from the R&B rulebook that has so far seen her sell some 7m albums in the US alone – namely a hip-hop backdrop of hard-knock beats tempered by a soul-lite vocal [...] A lack of originality and too much filler mark Ashanti more as a pedestrian than the princess she purports to be." Steve Appleford from the Los Angeles Times wrote that Ashanti and Concrete Rose sound "trapped, sapped of strength and ideas, and buried beneath all the worst cold and calculated production tendencies of her label [...] What follows is modern R&B; formula at its most flat and uninspired. For all her lovesick panting, pleading and purring, Ashanti is never emotionally engaged with the songs, which aren't worth the trouble anyway." Entertainment Weekly's Raymond Fiore remarked that "the thin-voiced vixen's third disc bruises both genres with a slew of mostly midtempo clunkers built with her weapons of choice: faux grit and forced sensuality." In his review for Slant Magazine, Sal Cinquemani wrote: "Ashanti is incapable of doing slinky or sexy and, despite her incessant attempts at vamping, she can't all-out sing either – she's even upstaged by a Hammond organ."

== Chart performance ==
During the week of Christmas, Concrete Rose debuted at number seven on the US Billboard 200 with first-week sales of 254,000 units. On the Top R&B/Hip Hop Albums chart the album debuted at number two where it spent a total of 28 consecutive weeks on the chart. On January 14, 2005, the album was certified Platinum by the Recording Industry Association of America (RIAA) for one million shipped units. By April 2008, the album had sold 871,000 copies, according to Nielsen Soundscan. Elsewhere, Concrete Rose debuted or peaked at number 16 in Japan, number 25 in the United Kingdom, number 36 in Germany, and number 65 in Canada. In Japan, the album was certified Gold by the Recording Industry Association of Japan (RIAJ). In the United Kingdom, it also peaked at number four on the UK R&B Albums chart and was eventually certified Gold by the British Phonographic Industry (BPI).

== Track listing ==
Concrete Rose track listing
No.	Title	Writer(s)	Producer(s)	Length
1.	"Concrete Rose" (Intro)	Seven Aurelius; Irv Gotti	Gotti; Aurelius	1:17
2.	"Still Down" (featuring T.I.)	Ashanti Douglas; Clifford Harris; Gotti; Kendred Smith; Malcolm Flythe	Gotti; Flythe; Jimi Kendrix^{[a]}	4:13
3.	"Message to the Fans" (Skit)	Douglas; Aurelius; Gotti; Denzil Foster; Jay King; Thomas McElroy	Gotti; Aurelius	0:23
4.	"Only U"	Douglas; Aurelius; Gotti	Gotti; Aurelius	3:06
5.	"Focus"	Douglas; Aurelius; Gotti; Jerry Barnes; Selan Lerner	Gotti; Aurelius	3:17
6.	"Don't Let Them"	Douglas; Gotti; Demetrius McGhee; Earl Randle; Lawrence Seymour; Willie Mitchell; Yvonne Mitchell	Gotti; Demi-Doc	4:23
7.	"Love Again"	Douglas; Aurelius; Gotti; Devin Copeland; Mike Dean; Brad Jordan; Winston Rogers; Todd Shaw	Gotti; Aurelius	4:08
8.	"Take Me Tonight" (featuring Lloyd)	Douglas; Gotti; Lloyd Polite; Smith	Gotti; Jimi Kendrix	4:05
9.	"U"	Douglas; Aurelius; Gotti; Donald DeGrate	Gotti; Aurelius	3:35
10.	"Every Lil' Thing"	Douglas; Aurelius; Gotti	Gotti; Aurelius	3:56
11.	"Turn It Up" (featuring Ja Rule)	Douglas; Aurelius; Gotti; Jeffrey Atkins; Curtis Mayfield; Smith	Gotti; Kendrix	4:16
12.	"Buck 3000" (Skit)	Douglas; Gotti; Andre Parker		0:22
13.	"So Hot"	Douglas; Gotti; Parker	Gotti; Demi-Doc; Chink Santana	4:57
14.	"Don't Leave Me Alone" (featuring 7 Aurelius)	Douglas; Aurelius; Gotti	Gotti; Aurelius	3:33
15.	"Sister Stories" (Skit) (featuring Shi Shi)	Douglas		0:45
16.	"Freedom"	Douglas; Gotti; McGhee	Gotti; Demi-Doc	3:51
17.	"Wonderful" (Remix) (featuring Ja Rule & R. Kelly)	Douglas; Gotti; Atkins; Smith; Robert Kelly	Gotti; Kendrix	4:41
Total length:				54:48

United Kingdom bonus track
No.	Title	Writer(s)	Producer(s)	Length
18.	"Touch My Body"	Douglas; Gotti; Kendrix	Gotti; Kendrix	3:30
Total length:				58:18

Japan bonus tracks
No.	Title	Writer(s)	Producer(s)	Length
18.	"Touch My Body"	Douglas; Gotti; Kendrix	Gotti; Kendrix	3:30
19.	"Spend the Night"	Douglas; Aurelius; Gotti; Parker	Gotti; Santana; Aurelius^{[a]}	3:30
Total length:				61:48

Notes

- ^{^a} denotes additional producer

Sample credits

- "Message to the Fans (Skit)" contains samples from "Why You Treat Me So Bad" by Club Nouveau, written by Denzil Foster, Jay King, Jocelyn McElroy, and Thomas McElroy.
- "Don't Let Them" contains interpolations of "Could I Be Falling In Love" by Syl Johnson, written by Willie Mitchell, Yvonne Mitchell, Earl Randle, and Lawrence Seymour.
- "Love Again" contains an interpolation of "Fuck Faces" by Scarface featuring Too Short, Tela, & Devin the Dude, and written by Devin Copeland, Mike Dean, Brad Jordan, Winston Rogers, and Todd Shaw.
- "U" contains interpolations of "Freek'n You (Mr. Dalvin's Freek Remix)" by Jodeci featuring Raekwon and Ghostface Killah, written by Donald DeGrate.
- "Turn It Up" contains a sample from "Short Eyes", written and performed by Curtis Mayfield.

== Personnel ==
- 7 Aurelius – vocals, background vocals, producer, associate executive producer, instrumentation
- Won "Engineer to the Stars" Bee Allen – engineer
- Chuck Amos – hair stylist
- David Ashton – engineer
- Ashaunna Ayars – marketing
- Jerry Barnes – bass guitar
- William Barnes – guitar
- Erica Bowen – recording director
- Milwaukee "Protools King" Buck – engineer
- Al "Boogie" Carty – bass
- Robin Clark – executive assistant
- Tom Coyne – mastering
- Kenneth Crouch – keyboards
- Ashanti Douglas – executive producer
- Tinya Y. Douglas – management
- Tony Duran – photography
- Easy Mo Bee – drum programming, beats
- Malcolm Flythe – producer
- Stephen George – mixing
- Irv Gotti – producer, executive producer, mixing
- Deidre Graham – marketing
- Terry "Murda Mac" Herbert – assistant engineer
- Bashiri Johnson – percussion
- Gavin "YG" Johnston – assistant engineer
- Terese Joseph – A&R
- Jimi Kendrix – producer
- Darcell Lawrence – production executive
- Trevor Lawrence – drums
- Selan Lerner – keyboards
- Jerome Leventhal – management
- Chris "Gotti" Lorenzo – A&R
- Tammy Lucas – background vocals
- Deborah Mannis-Gardner – sample clearance
- Glen "It's Crazy" Markazi – engineer, mixing
- Josh McDonnell – assistant engineer
- Demetrius McGhee – organ, strings, bass guitar, keyboards, producer, instrumentation
- Rosie Michel – stylist
- Fred Moore – A&R
- Karen Moskowitz – photography
- Rick Patrick – creative director
- Tenisha Ramos – marketing
- Bill Sample – Hammond organ
- Chink Santana – producer
- Adam Scheurmann – engineer, assistant engineer
- Paul Silveira – engineer
- Todd "Shortma" Simms – A&R
- Quinshae Snead – personal assistant
- Rob Stefanson – assistant engineer
- Supa Engineer "Dura" – mixing
- Laura Tamburino – art producer
- Errol "Breezie" Jr. Vaughn – A&R
- Andy West – art direction

== Charts ==
=== Weekly charts ===
Weekly chart performance for Concrete Rose
Chart (2005)	Peak position
Australian Albums (ARIA)	89
Australian Urban Albums (ARIA)	13
Canadian Albums (Nielsen SoundScan)	65
Dutch Albums (Album Top 100)	73
French Albums (SNEP)	98
German Albums (Offizielle Top 100)	36
Japanese Albums (Oricon)	16
Scottish Albums (Official Charts)	59
Swiss Albums (Schweizer Hitparade)	66
Taiwanese Albums (Five Music)	18
UK Albums (Official Charts)	25
UK R&B Albums (Official Charts)	4
US Billboard 200	7
US Top R&B/Hip-Hop Albums (Billboard)	2

=== Year-end charts ===
Year-end chart performance for Concrete Rose
Chart (2005)	Position
US Billboard 200	76
US Top R&B/Hip-Hop Albums (Billboard)	28

== Certifications ==
Certifications for Concrete Rose
Region	Certification	Certified units/sales
Japan (RIAJ)	Gold	100,000^{^}
United Kingdom (BPI)	Gold	100,000^{^}
United States (RIAA)	Platinum	1,000,000^{^}
^{^} Shipments figures based on certification alone.
