= Don't Let Them =

Single by Ashanti

from the album Concrete Rose
- Released: April 5, 2005
- Recorded: 2004
- Studio: C.H. (New York City); Armoury (Vancouver)
- Genre: R&B; downtempo
- Length: 4:10
- Label: The Inc.; Def Jam
- Songwriters: Ashanti Douglas; Irv Gotti; Demetrius McGhee; Earl Randle; Lawrence Seymour; Willie Mitchell; Yvonne Mitchell
- Producers: Irv Gotti; Demi-Doc

Ashanti singles chronology
"Only U" (2004)	"Don't Let Them" (2005)	"Still on It" (2005)

"Don't Let Them" is a song by American singer Ashanti. It was written by Ashanti along with its producers Irv Gotti and Demetrius "Demi-Doc" McGhee for her third studio album, Concrete Rose (2004). The song contains interpolations from "Could I Be Falling in Love" (1974) by American blues and soul singer Syl Johnson. Due to the inclusion of the sample, Willie Mitchell, Yvonne Mitchell, Earl Randle, and Lawrence Seymour are also credited as songwriters.

The song was selected as the album's second and final single and only released in the United States, where it failed to chart, and the United Kingdom, reaching the number 38 on the UK Singles Chart. The song also gained minimal success in Ireland, peaking at 41 on the Irish Singles Chart. A music video for "Don't Let Them," directed by Ashanti and Gotti, as shot in March 2005 and features Chink Santana as Ashanti's love interest.

== Background ==
"Don't Let Them" was written by Ashanti, Irv Gotti and Demetrius "Demi-Doc" McGhee and recorded for her third studio album, Concrete Rose (2004). Production on the track was helmed by Gotti and McGhee. "Don't Let Them" contains interpolations from the song "Could I Be Falling in Love" (1974) by American blues and soul singer Syl Johnson, written by Willie Mitchell, Yvonne Mitchell, Earl Randle, and Lawrence Seymour. Billboard initially reported that "Don't Leave Me Alone" had been selected as the second single from Concrete Rose.

== Critical reception ==
In a negative review for Billboard, editor Chuck Taylor wrote about "Don't Let Them" that "because many of her sample-heavy novelty songs have become smash hits, the R&B siren has now found the courage to attempt singing without so many gimmicks and instruments engulfing her voice. This was not an informed decision. Ashanti's vocals are as melodic as a 40-car pileup and about as emotional as a fence post. "Don't Let Them" is perhaps the emptiest offering yet from an artist whose popularity remains inexplicable."

== Music video ==
A music video for "Don't Let Them" was shot in March 2005 and directed by Ashanti and Irv Gotti. It starts off with her from early in the morning and introduces the video play system, while depicting the on-and-off relationships between a couple. Fellow The Inc. recording artist Chink Santana portrays Ashanti's love interest in the video.

== Track listing ==
UK CD maxi-single
No.	Title	Writer(s)	Producer(s)	Length
1.	"Don't Let Them" (Album Version)	Ashanti Douglas; Irv Gotti; Demetrius McGhee; Earl Randle; Lawrence Seymour; Willie Mitchell; Yvonne Mitchell	Gotti; Demi-Doc	4:23
2.	"Only U" (Kelly G's Club Mix)	Douglas; Seven Aurelius; Gotti	Gotti; Aurelius; Kelly Griffin^{[a]}	6:42
3.	"Foolish" (Album Version)	Douglas; Gotti; Mark DeBarge; Etterlene Jordan	Gotti	3:47

Notes

- ^{^[a]} denotes additional producer

Sample credits

- "Don't Let Them" contains interpolations from "Could I Be Falling in Love" by Syl Johnson.
- "Foolish" contains a sample from "Stay with Me" by DeBarge.

== Charts ==
Weekly chart performance for "Don't Let Them"
Chart (2005)	Peak position
Ireland (IRMA)	41
Scotland Singles (OCC)	50
UK Singles (OCC)	38
UK Hip Hop/R&B (OCC)	8

== Release history ==
Release dates and formats for "Don't Let Them"
Region	Date	Format	Label	Ref.
United States	April 5, 2005	Urban radio; Rhythmic contemporary radio	The Inc.; Def Jam	
United States	April 12, 2005	Contemporary hit radio	The Inc.; Def Jam	
United Kingdom	June 6, 2005	CD	Mercury	
