= Pain Is Love 2 =

Studio album by Ja Rule
- Released: February 28, 2012
- Recorded: 2011
- Genre: Hip hop
- Length: 43:58
- Label: Mpire Music Group; Fontana
- Producer: 7 Aurelius; Ja Rule; Irv Gotti; Tony Dofat; Roc; Jim Beanz; 700; Ghost Kasen; Bks; Gibson; Ko

Ja Rule chronology
Icon (2012)	Pain Is Love 2 (2012)

Singles from PIL2
- 1. "Real Life Fantasy" Released: December 13, 2011

Pain Is Love 2 (also known under the acronym PIL2) is the seventh studio album by American rapper Ja Rule. It was released on February 28, 2012, by Mpire Music Group and Fontana Distribution. The album was released during Ja Rule's incarceration on charges of gun possession and tax evasion. The album was delayed several times prior to its release.

Production on the album was handled by 7 Aurelius. This is the sequel to his album Pain Is Love (2001). The album debuted at number 197 on the US Billboard 200 chart, with 3,200 copies sold in its first week.

== Critical reception ==
Professional ratings
Review scores
Source	Rating
AllMusic	3.5/5 stars
HipHopDX	3.5/5 stars
RapReviews	(6.5/10)

AllMusic's David Jeffries noted some tonal whiplash throughout the album when going from "party and crossover numbers" to honest ruminations on the downfalls of fame but said that the listener can rearrange it to maximize the latter's impact. He concluded that: "It's enough for fans to ignore the flaws of PIL2, and enough to keep them faithful during the coming drought." Andres Tardio of HipHopDX wrote that: "Pain is Love 2 acts as an update on where Ja Rule has traveled in life in recent years and it is an honest look at how he views those travels. His self-awareness and honesty bring a fresh take. This insight comes with a darker tone that could have been delivered in a more cohesive manner. However, by trying to add something for everyone, Rule lost some of that consistency. While it is no perfect return, Pain is Love 2 is a reminder of why Rule was once atop the Hip Hop sphere. Now the question is if he can ever truly return to the top." Pete T. of RapReviews called it "a fairly mixed bag of sultry club jams and sweet R&B collaborations", saying that 7 Aurelius' production can move from being "sleek and contemporary" to stale and inoffensive at points, and Ja's musicianship carries "hackneyed lyricism" but a newfound self-awareness of fame and fortune, concluding that: "PIL 2" is flawed but commendable. Through it all, it's vintage Ja - none of the posturing and rumbling street anthems of Murder Inc.'s early days, but rather music that is perhaps more central to Ja's essence: heartfelt pop tunes and some long-overdue introspection. Although some of the material is predictably insubstantial, it's an inspiring effort from a guy who's been bruised and battered but will live to see another day.

== Track listing ==
- All songs produced by 7 Aurelius.

No.	Title	Writer(s)	Length
1.	"Fuck Fame (Intro)" (featuring Leah Siegel)	Jeffrey Atkins; Marcus Vest; Tony Dofat	2:33
2.	"Real Life Fantasy" (featuring Anita Louise)	Atkins; Vest; A. Schwartz; Joseph Angel; Raymond Angry; Roc The Producer. (Additional Production)	3:38
3.	"Parachute" (featuring Leah Siegel)	Atkins; Vest	3:23
4.	"SuperStar (Intro)"	Atkins; Vest	0:16
5.	"SuperStar"	Atkins; Vest	4:54
6.	"Black Vodka"	Atkins; Vest	5:01
7.	"Drown" (featuring Somong)	Atkins; Vest	4:40
8.	"Never Had Time" (featuring John Doe)	Atkins; Vest	3:15
9.	"Strange Days" (featuring 7 Aurelius and Ramzo)	Atkins; Vest	2:44
10.	"To the Top" (featuring Kalenna Harper)	Atkins; Vest; James BKS Edjouma	3:28
11.	"Pray" (featuring Leah Siegel)	Atkins; Vest; AJ Platinum	3:12
12.	"Believe"	Atkins; James BKS Edjouma	2:57
13.	"Spun a Web" (featuring Amina)	Atkins; Vest	3:51
Total length:			43:58

== Personnel ==
- Art Direction – Pini
- Art Direction, Executive-Producer – Ja Rule
- Art Direction, Layout [Design Lay Out]
- Executive-Producer – Seven
- Artwork [Design Consultant] – Dawud
- Design [Album Cover] – Pini Siluk
- Executive-Producer – Irv Gotti
- Layout [Design Lay Out] – Scorpio Of Coutain Designs
- Painting ["Fuck Fame"] – Jeremy Schinazi

== Charts ==
Chart (2012)	Peak position
US Billboard 200	197
US R&B/Hip-Hop Albums (Billboard)	34
US Rap Albums (Billboard)	21
US Independent Albums (Billboard)	28
