= Still on It =

Single by Ashanti featuring Paul Wall & Method Man

from the album Collectables by Ashanti
- Released: November 7, 2005
- Recorded: 2004 (Los Angeles)
- Length: 4:25
- Label: The Inc.
- Songwriters: Ashanti Douglas; Irving Lorenzo; M McGregor; Paul Slayton; Clifford Smith; Andre Brown; Eric McIntosh; Tyrone Kelse
- Producers: Irv Gotti; Arizona Slim

Ashanti singles chronology
"Don't Let Them" (2005)	"Still on It" (2005)	"Pac's Life" (2006)

Method Man singles chronology
"The Show" (2004)	"Still on It" (2005)	"Say" (2006)

Paul Wall singles chronology
"Grillz" (2005)	"Still on It" (2005)	"They Don't Know" (2005)

"Still on It" is a song by American singer Ashanti featuring rappers Paul Wall and Method Man. It was written by Ashanti, Wall, and Method Man along with its producers, Irv Gotti and Marlon "Arizona Slim" McGregor, for her first remix album Collectables by Ashanti (2005). The song contains samples from "Sittin' on Chrome" (1995) by American hip hop crew Masta Ace Incorporated. Due to the sample, Masta Ace is also credited as a songwriter.

The song was seclected as the album's first and only single and released in late November 2005. "Still on It" generated less commercial interest than previous Ashanti singles, reaching number 55 on the US Hot R&B/Hip-Hop Songs chart. The Inc. produced and issued to further versions of the song aside from the original version with Wall and Method Man, including remixes featuring T.I. and labelmate Caddillac Tah, respectively.

== Critical reception ==
AllMusic called the song "ruggedly sweet." In a negative review, Billboard described the song as a "nameless offering." The magazine found that "as usual, [Ashanti's] whispy light vocals deserve a place in the background rather than representing the marquee namesake of this single."

== Track listings ==
12-inch single

1. "Still on It" (Main) (featuring Method Man and Paul Wall)
2. "Still on It" (Instrumental)
3. "Still Down (Remix)" (Main) (featuring T.I.)
4. "Still on It" (A Cappella) (featuring Method Man and Paul Wall)
5. "Still Down (Remix)" (Clean) (featuring Cadillac Tah)
6. "Still Down (Remix)" (Main) (featuring Cadillac Tah)
7. "Still Down (Remix)" (Instrumental)

== Charts ==
Weekly chart performance for "Still on It"
Chart (2005)	Peak position
US Hot R&B/Hip-Hop Songs (Billboard)	55
