= Breakup 2 Makeup =

"Breakup 2 Makeup (Remix)"

Single by Ashanti featuring Black Child

from the album Chapter II and Collectables by Ashanti
- Released: 2004
- Studio: Crackhouse Studios (New York, NY)
- Length: 3:44
- Label: Murder Inc.; Island Def Jam
- Songwriter(s): Ashanti Douglas; Andre Parker; Irving Lorenzo; Christopher Wallace; Fred Wesley; James Brown; Roy C. Hammond
- Producer(s): Irv Gotti; Chink Santana

Ashanti singles chronology
"Rain on Me" (2003)	"Breakup 2 Makeup (Remix)" (2004)	"Southside" (2004)

"Breakup 2 Makeup (Remix)" is a song by American singer Ashanti, released as the first single from her first remix album Collectables by Ashanti. It features her labelmate Black Child. It reached number 76 on the US Billboard Hot R&B/Hip-Hop Singles & Tracks chart, becoming Ashanti's first single to not reach the US Billboard Hot 100. The song was originally recorded as a solo version on Ashanti's second album Chapter II but was later remixed for the single release while Ashanti was working on her next album.

The video was produced by Irv Gotti and begins in black and white before progressing to color. It shows Ashanti and Black Child singing to each other and includes a dance off towards the beginning of the video, as well as Ashanti and her female backup dancers performing a choreographed dance-break near the end. It was released in early 2004 to BET's 106 & Park.

== Track listing ==
1. "Breakup 2 Makeup (Remix)" (radio edit)
2. "Breakup 2 Makeup (Remix)" (instrumental version)
3. "Breakup 2 Makeup (Remix)" (call out research hook)

== Charts ==
Chart (2004)	Peak position
US Hot R&B/Hip-Hop Songs (Billboard)	76
