= Can't Stop (album) =

Demo album by Ashanti
- Released: January 25, 2006
- Recorded: February 7, 1994–July 15, 1997
- Genre: R&B
- Length: 42:28
- Label: Stomp; Black Claw; Simply Music; Big

Ashanti chronology
Collectables by Ashanti (2005)	Can't Stop (2006)	The Declaration (2008)

Can't Stop is a demo album featuring music recorded by American singer Ashanti. The album was first released in 2004 and then on January 25, 2006, in United States. It was re-released multiple times under different labels throughout 2007. It was released on May 31, 2012, for digital download in United Kingdom only.

== Background and release ==
"Can't Stop" features material that Ashanti (born Ashanti Douglas) recorded on July 15, 1997. The tapes resurfaced in September 2004 and was re-mixed and mastered by Genard Parker and Ernie Lake.

Ashanti claims she recorded the material for demo-shopping purposes and never intended the recordings to be released to the public.

"I was just a teenager following my dreams when I signed with Parker. Me and my mother went to his house to work on some songs hoping to launch my career. Genard couldn't deliver for me and he signed a release permitting me to go to another record company."

Further, on two of the tracks she only sings background vocals, while on another she is not performing at all.

Ashaniti filed suit to stop distribution. In addition to Genard Parker (and possibly Ernie Lake), Big Records Australia, Farm Records, Unique Corp., Simply Vinyl, Team Entertainment, ZYX Music and others are named as defendants in the lawsuit. The album has a street date of February 21, 2005.

== Lawsuit ==
Genard Parker sued Ashanti for breach of contract and the jury awarded $630,000. When Ashanti got a record deal, he let her out of the contract she signed with him, with the understanding that he would get to produce some songs for her and earn royalties. Although the jury took Parker's side, they did not give him everything he asked for. He had sued Ashanti for $2.2 million. Of the $630,000 awarded by the jury, US District Judge Jed Rakoff rejected all but $50,000 of the award on the grounds that the jurors did not have adequate facts to determine damages so they were left to speculate. Ashanti sought an injunction to block the release and damages in excess of $1 million. On September 19, 2006, Ashanti settled the lawsuit with Parker out of court, dropping all litigation in their contract dispute.

== Track listing ==
=== US standard edition ===
1. "Can't Stop" – 4:01
2. "Come 2 Me" – 3:52
3. "More Than a Melody" – 4:49
4. "You Don't Have 2 Love Me" – 4:50 (performed by Kenny Greene)
5. "Believe" – 4:17
6. "Don't Ever Let Me Go" – 3:47
7. "It's About Time" – 3:52
8. "Baby Baby" – 4:00
9. "You Always Seem to Make Me Feel" – 3:41
10. "By My Side (Prelude)" – 3:26
11. "Baby Baby" (Red Rhythm Radio Mix) – 3:53

=== Japanese edition ===
1. "Can't Stop" – 4:01
2. "Come 2 Me" – 3:52
3. "More Than a Melody" – 4:49
4. "You Don't Have 2 Love Me" – 4:50 (performed by Kenny Greene)
5. "Believe" – 4:17
6. "Don't Ever Let Me Go" – 3:47
7. "It's About Time" – 3:52
8. "Baby Baby" – 4:00
9. "You Always Seem to Make Me Feel" – 3:41
10. "By My Side (Prelude)" – 3:26
11. "Baby Baby (Remix)"
12. "Can't Stop (Remix)"
13. "You Don't Have 2 Love Me (Remix)"
14. "Believe [Smoker Remix]"

== Personnel ==
- Ashanti – primary artist
- Anna Blightman – project coordinator
- Simon Britton – producer, remixing
- Dave Cintron – multi instruments, producer, programming, remixing
- Jocelyn McElroy – writing, background vocals
- Kenny Greene – composer
- Adam Kudzin – composer, multi instruments, producer
- Ernie Lake – producer
- Gene Lake – producer
- Aaron Lindsey – composer
- James Loughrey – digital editing, mixing
- Ulf Magnusson – photography
- Richard Mayes – executive producer, project director
- Genard Parker – executive producer, multi instruments, producer, programming, vocal arrangement
- Red Rhythm – remixing
- Parkes Stewart – composer
- Steve Thompson – producer
- Mike Warner – multi instruments, producer
- Kyle West – multi instruments
- Darin Whittington – composer, producer
- Kurt Woodley – A&R, arranger, engineer

Credits for Can't Stop adapted from AllMusic.

== Release history ==
Region	Date	Label	Format	Catalog
United States	January 25, 2006	Simply Music	CD	002
United States	February 21, 2006	Black Claw	CD	50024
United States	September 18, 2006	Stomp	CD	305
United States	October 31, 2006	Black Claw	CD	50024
Japan	March 24, 2007	Japanese Import	CD	305
United States	April 19, 2007	Big	CD	11
United Kingdom	May 31, 2012	Entertain Me Europe	Digital download	—N/a
