= List of Billboard 200 number-one albums of 2003 =

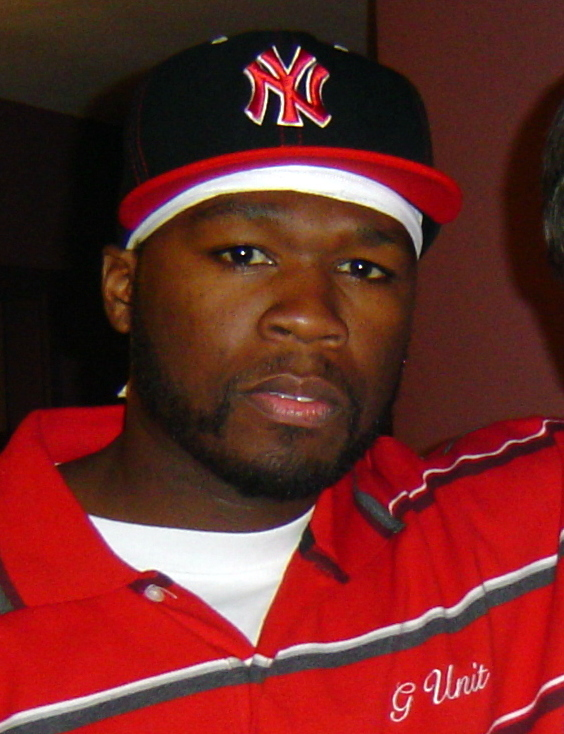
Get Rich or Die Tryin' by 50 Cent was the best-selling album of 2003.

The highest-selling albums and EPs in the United States are ranked in the Billboard 200, published by Billboard magazine. The data are compiled by Nielsen Soundscan based on each album's weekly discrete and download sales.

In 2003, 34 different albums reached the #1 spot on the Billboard 200. Get Rich or Die Tryin' by the American rapper 50 Cent spent the longest time at #1, with 6 non-consecutive weeks at the top of the albums list. It also became the best performing album of 2003.

== Chart history ==
Key
| † | Indicates best performing album of 2003 |

| Issue date | Album | Artist(s) | Sales | Ref. |
|---|---|---|---|---|
| January 4 | Up! | Shania Twain | 459,000 | |
| January 11 | 8 Mile | Soundtrack | 313,000 | |
| January 18 | 8 Mile | Soundtrack | 119,000 | |
| January 25 | Come Away with Me | Norah Jones | 108,000 | |
| February 1 | Come Away with Me | Norah Jones | 114,000 | |
| February 8 | Come Away with Me | Norah Jones | 112,000 | |
| February 15 | Home | Dixie Chicks | 104,000 | |
| February 22 | Get Rich or Die Tryin' † | 50 Cent | 872,000 | |
| March 1 | Get Rich or Die Tryin' † | 50 Cent | 822,000 | |
| March 8 | Chocolate Factory | R. Kelly | 532,000 | |
| March 15 | Come Away with Me | Norah Jones | 621,000 | |
| March 22 | Get Rich or Die Tryin' † | 50 Cent | 359,000 | |
| March 29 | Get Rich or Die Tryin' † | 50 Cent | 280,000 | |
| April 5 | Get Rich or Die Tryin' † | 50 Cent | 234,000 | |
| April 12 | Meteora | Linkin Park | 810,000 | |
| April 19 | Meteora | Linkin Park | 265,000 | |
| April 26 | Faceless | Godsmack | 269,000 | |
| May 3 | Thankful | Kelly Clarkson | 297,000 | |
| May 10 | American Life | Madonna | 241,000 | |
| May 17 | Get Rich or Die Tryin' † | 50 Cent | 128,000 | |
| May 24 | Body Kiss | The Isley Brothers featuring Ronald Isley | 150,000 | |
| May 31 | The Golden Age of Grotesque | Marilyn Manson | 118,000 | |
| June 7 | 14 Shades of Grey | Staind | 220,000 | |
| June 14 | How the West Was Won | Led Zeppelin | 154,000 | |
| June 21 | St. Anger | Metallica | 418,000 | |
| June 28 | Dance with My Father | Luther Vandross | 442,000 | |
| July 5 | After the Storm | Monica | 185,000 | |
| July 12 | Dangerously in Love | Beyoncé | 317,000 | |
| July 19 | Chapter II | Ashanti | 326,000 | |
| July 26 | Chapter II | Ashanti | 135,000 | |
| August 2 | Bad Boys II | Soundtrack | 324,000 | |
| August 9 | Bad Boys II | Soundtrack | 197,000 | |
| August 16 | Bad Boys II | Soundtrack | 155,000 | |
| August 23 | Bad Boys II | Soundtrack | 121,000 | |
| August 30 | Greatest Hits Volume II and Some Other Stuff | Alan Jackson | 328,000 | |
| September 6 | The Neptunes Present... Clones | The Neptunes / Various Artists | 249,000 | |
| September 13 | Love & Life | Mary J. Blige | 286,000 | |
| September 20 | Metamorphosis | Hilary Duff | 131,000 | |
| September 27 | Heavier Things | John Mayer | 316,500 | |
| October 4 | Grand Champ | DMX | 312,000 | |
| October 11 | Speakerboxxx/The Love Below | OutKast | 509,600 | |
| October 18 | Speakerboxxx/The Love Below | OutKast | 235,000 | |
| October 25 | Chicken*N*Beer | Ludacris | 429,000 | |
| November 1 | Measure of a Man | Clay Aiken | 613,000 | |
| November 8 | Measure of a Man | Clay Aiken | 225,000 | |
| November 15 | Speakerboxxx/The Love Below | OutKast | 142,000 | |
| November 22 | Shock'n Y'all | Toby Keith | 585,000 | |
| November 29 | The Black Album | Jay-Z | 464,000 | |
| December 6 | In the Zone | Britney Spears | 609,000 | |
| December 13 | The Black Album | Jay-Z | 260,000 | |
| December 20 | The Diary of Alicia Keys | Alicia Keys | 618,000 | |
| December 27 | Soulful | Ruben Studdard | 416,500 | |

== See also ==
- 2003 in music
