= Rain on Me (Ashanti song) =

2003 single by Ashanti

Single by Ashanti

from the album Chapter II
- Released: August 11, 2003
- Studio: Crackhouse (New York City)
- Genre: R&B
- Length: 4:57
- Label: Murder Inc.
- Songwriters: Ashanti Douglas; Irving Lorenzo; Andre Parker; Burt Bacharach; Hal David
- Producers: Irv Gotti; Chink Santana

Ashanti singles chronology
"Rock wit U (Awww Baby)" (2003)	"Rain on Me" (2003)	"Breakup 2 Makeup (Remix)" (2004)

Audio sample
- "Rain on Me": file; help

"Rain on Me" is a song recorded by R&B singer-songwriter Ashanti. Produced by Irv Gotti and Chink Santana, it was released as the second single from her second album Chapter II on August 11, 2003. The record contains a sample of "The Look of Love" by Isaac Hayes. A commercial success, it reached number seven on the US Billboard Hot 100 chart and the top 20 in the United Kingdom.

In 2004, the song earned Ashanti a Grammy nomination for Best Female R&B Vocal Performance. The song's music video was released on August 28, 2003, and features Ashanti playing a superstar abused by a jealous boyfriend, played by actor Larenz Tate. The rap remix found on the Collectibles by Ashanti album interpolates "Can I Live" by rapper Jay-Z, which also samples the same Hayes song (and also produced by Irv Gotti). The remix also features Hussein Fatal and fellow The Inc. Records labelmates Charli "Chuck" Baltimore and Ja Rule.

== Lyrics and music video ==
Ashanti's lyrics for "Rain on Me" address the pains and challenges of facing, and eventually overcoming, an abusive relationship. Wanting to make a cinematic and narrative-driven video for the song, she worked with LidRock and director Hype Williams to produce the clip. Ashanti explained: "We wanted to make a short movie that was 'real' — that showed that no matter if you're rich or poor, black or white, famous or not, domestic violence can touch your life."

The abusive boyfriend was played by actor Larenz Tate, best known for starring in Dead Presidents, a film which also features "The Look of Love" by Isaac Hayes. In the video, Ashanti and Tate (playing her boyfriend André) are shown in a relationship together while close-up scenes of her bruised face and glimpses of the two of them fighting appear throughout. Towards the climax, Tate is caught cheating on Ashanti with another girl as she tells him to leave. After a last confrontation, Ashanti ends the relationship as sounds of rain and thunder are heard gradually increasing leaving André behind. In the mini-movie version, we see Tate driving in a car as previous scenes are shown before he is hit by a truck and killed.

There are three versions of the video: one where the song begins at the start with the video's end showing Ashanti still sitting in a limo looking out of the window; the second with Ashanti singing in the rain wearing a yellow dress as scenes from the first video play in between, and the third (the mini-movie), which has more dialogue spoken by Ashanti and Tate themselves.

=== LidRock and the Family Violence Prevention Fund ===
Ashanti partnered with LidRock and the San Francisco-based Family Violence Prevention Fund (FVPF) to raise awareness of domestic violence during National Domestic Violence Awareness Month and to help distribute the mini-movie, which was also shown on MTV, BET, and other music video programs. Proceeds from sales of the LidRock discs were put toward the FVPF.

Esta Soler, founder and president of the Family Violence Prevention Fund said: "When we heard 'Rain on Me' and saw the Ashanti LidRock mini movie, we knew the powerful messages about violence that they artfully convey would speak to a lot of people. Ashanti wrote an amazing song that, by itself, has incredible power and emotional resonance. The LidRock minimovie just enhances the song's power, as it realistically portrays the complexity of domestic violence and the characters' inspiring strength in addressing the situation."

Additionally, a public service announcement about domestic violence featuring Ashanti was aired nationwide on October 17, 2003, on more than 4,000 screens at Regal Cinemas, United Artists Theatres, Edwards Theatres, and Hoyts Cinemas.

== Charts ==
=== Weekly charts ===
Chart (2003)	Peak position
Belgium (Ultratip Bubbling Under Flanders)	15
Belgium (Ultratip Bubbling Under Wallonia)	17
Canada (Nielsen SoundScan)	27
Germany (GfK)	70
Scottish Singles Sales (Official Charts)	32
Switzerland (Schweizer Hitparade)	85
UK Singles (Official Charts)	19
UK Hip Hop/R&B (Official Charts)	10
US Billboard Hot 100	7
US Dance Singles Sales (Billboard)	27
US Hot R&B/Hip-Hop Songs (Billboard)	2
US Rhythmic Airplay (Billboard)	11

=== Year-end charts ===
Chart (2003)	Position
US Billboard Hot 100	83
US Hot R&B/Hip-Hop Singles & Tracks (Billboard)	32

== Release history ==
Region	Date	Format(s)	Label(s)	Ref.
United States	August 11, 2003	Rhythmic contemporary; urban radio	Murder Inc.	
United States	October 6, 2003	Urban AC radio	Murder Inc.	
