= Ashanti's Christmas =

Studio album by Ashanti
- Released: November 18, 2003
- Studios: CHS Studios (New York, NY)
- Genres: Christmas; R&B
- Length: 29:22
- Label: The Inc.
- Producers: Ashanti Douglas (also exec.); Irv Gotti (also exec.); Chink Santana; Demi McGhee

Ashanti chronology
Chapter II (2003)	Ashanti's Christmas (2003)	Concrete Rose (2004)

Ashanti's Christmas is the third studio album by American singer Ashanti, released on November 18, 2003, by The Inc. Records. Chiefly produced by label head Irv Gotti, it is a follow-up to her second studio album, Chapter II (2003) and her first Christmas album. Ashanti's Christmas consists of ten tracks, featuring four original songs co-penned by Ashanti and six cover versions of Christmas standards and carols, including "The Christmas Song", "Silent Night", "Winter Wonderland" and others.

The album earned largely negative reviews from music critics, who panned its production and Ashanti's singing. Ashanti's Christmas peaked at number 160 on the Billboard 200 and number 43 on the Top R&B/Hip-Hop Albums chart. As for singles, Ashanti released a medley which featured the songs "Christmas Time Again", "The Christmas Song", and "Hey Santa". A video was shot for the medley and it received moderate rotation on BET and MTV. A reworked version of the original song "Time of Year" would later appear on Ashanti's second Christmas project, the 2013 EP A Wonderful Christmas with Ashanti.

== Critical reception ==
Professional ratings
Review scores
Source	Rating
AllMusic	1.5/5 stars
Slant	1.5/5 stars

Ashanti's Christmas earned largely negative reviews from music critics. Caroline Sullivan from The Guardian found that Ashanti exhibits "zip" on Ashanti's Christmas, further writing: "Her pure tones complement a very contemporary minxy streak that's dying to unwrap all those exciting presents. "Hey Santa" is the stand-out: a list of demands ("How about a diamond bracelet, a baby-blue convertible...") delivered with the charm that typifies the rest of the album." Slant Magazine editor Alexa Camp felt that the "production values on Ashanti’s Christmas are so bargain-basement that they actually match the poor girl’s singing abilities. Occasionally (and I stress occasionally), Ashanti’s voice actually outshines the low-budget, Casio keyboard production and Karaoke machine synth strings."

AllMusic editor David Jeffries found that Ashanti's Christmas features Irv Gotti's "least slick and least satisfying production work. Ashanti's voice fits sweet holiday music well, and she could deliver an excellent Christmas album given the chance, but it seems Gotti can't be bothered to surround her with anything worthwhile [...] A drum machine that chugs on and on before someone has the good sense to turn it off takes up the last 30 seconds of the 20-minute album. It's a perfectly lifeless moment that caps off a perfectly humdrum album." In another negative review, Tracy E. Hopkins from Rolling Stone wrote that "if you're looking for spirit, you won't find it on Ashanti's joyless Christmas album." She noted that "the thin-piped songbird nearly redeems herself, however, on the sentimental "Time of Year" and karaoke-worthy covers of Donny Hathaway's "This Christmas" and the old standby "Silent Night." But even those songs don't generate enough warmth to shake off the album's bah humbugs."

== Chart performance ==
Ashanti's Christmas debuted at number 167 on the US Billboard 200 in the week of December 6, 2003. It eventually peaked at number 160 two weeks later. It also reached number 13 on the Top Holiday Albums chart. On December 16, 2003, MTV News reported that the album had sold 37,000 copies in the United States.

== Track listing ==
Ashanti's Christmas track listing
No.	Title	Writer(s)	Producer(s)	Length
1.	"Christmas Time Again"	Ashanti Douglas; Irving Lorenzo, Jr.; Andre Parker	Irv Gotti; Chink Santana	4:05
2.	"The Christmas Song"	Mel Tormé; Robert Wells	Gotti	3:19
3.	"Hey Santa"	Douglas; Lorenzo	Gotti	1:55
4.	"This Christmas"	Donny Hathaway; Nadine McKinnor	Gotti	2:59
5.	"Sharing Christmas"	Douglas; Lorenzo	Gotti	4:14
6.	"Silent Night"	Franz Xaver Gruber; Joseph Mohr	Gotti	2:13
7.	"Joy to the World"	Lowell Mason; Isaac Watts	Gotti	1:56
8.	"Winter Wonderland"	Felix Bernard; Dick Smith	Gotti	2:16
9.	"Time of Year"	Douglas; Lorenzo; Demi McGhee	Gotti; McGhee	4:50
10.	"We Wish You a Merry Christmas"	Traditional	Gotti	1:35
Total length:				29:22

== Credits ==
- Milwaukee Buck – engineer
- Daniel Cooper – marketing
- Tom Coyne – mastering
- Ashanti Douglas – vocals
- Duro – mixing
- Daniela Federici – cover photo
- Chris G.O.T.T.I. – A&R
- Irv Gotti – mixing, producer
- Deidre Graham – marketing
- Terry "Murda Mac" Herbert – assistant
- Graham Kuhm – inlay photography

- Darcell Lawrence – A&R
- Demi McGhee – instrumentation, producer
- Fred Moore – A&R assistance
- Rick Patrick – creative director
- Patrick "Plain Pat" Reynolds – A&R
- Chink Santana – producer
- Todd "Shortma" Simms – A&R assistance
- Tony Vanias – recording director
- Errol "Eezie" Vaughan, Jr. – A&R
- Andy West – art direction

== Charts ==
Weekly chart performance for Ashanti's Christmas
Chart (2003)	Peak position
Japanese Albums (Oricon)	48
US Billboard 200	160
US Top Holiday Albums (Billboard)	13
US Top R&B/Hip-Hop Albums (Billboard)	43

== Release history ==
Ashanti's Christmas release history
Region	Date	Format	Label	Ref(s)
Various	November 18, 2003	CD; digital download	The Inc.	
