= Rock wit U (Awww Baby) =

2003 single by Ashanti

Single by Ashanti

from the album Chapter II
- Released: May 19, 2003
- Studio: Crackhouse (New York City)
- Length: 3:40
- Label: Def Jam; Murder Inc.
- Songwriters: Ashanti Douglas; Irving Lorenzo; Andre Parker
- Producers: Irv Gotti; Chink Santana

Ashanti singles chronology
"Mesmerize" (2002)	"Rock wit U (Awww Baby)" (2003)	"Rain on Me" (2003)

"Rock wit U (Awww Baby)" is a song by American R&B singer-songwriter Ashanti. Written by her along with Irv Gotti and Chink Santana for her second studio album, Chapter II (2003), and produced by Gotti and Santana, the song was released by Def Jam Records and Murder Inc. on May 19, 2003, as the lead single from Chapter II. "Rock wit U" peaked at No. 2 on the US Billboard Hot 100 chart for one week and charted worldwide, reaching No. 4 in Canada, No. 7 in the United Kingdom, and No. 19 in Australia.

== Music video ==
Directed by Paul Hunter and filmed in Miami in early May 2003, the music video for "Rock wit U (Awww Baby)" features Ashanti at a beach with her boyfriend while they flirt in bed together and driving down the road in a Jeep. In some scenes, the boyfriend watches Ashanti dance for him in the house and behind some trees at night. There is also a scene where she rides on an elephant in the water. The video was nominated at the 2003 MTV Video Music Awards for Best R&B Video.

== Samples ==
The song was sampled for British rapper Aitch's single "Baby". The single was released on 10 March 2022. It debuted on the UK Official Singles Top 100 on 18 March 2022, placing at No. 2. Three years later was resampled for Trippie Redd's single World Boss.

== Track listings ==
US 12-inch single
No.	Title	Producer(s)	Length
1.	"Rock wit U (Awww Baby)" (main)	Chink Santana; Irv Gotti	3:38
2.	"Rock wit U (Awww Baby)" (instrumental)	Santana; Gotti	3:38
3.	"Rock wit U (Awww Baby)" (acapella)	Santana; Gotti	3:26

UK CD single
No.	Title	Producer(s)	Length
1.	"Rock wit U (Awww Baby)" (album version clean)	Santana; Gotti	3:38
2.	"Baby" (clean remix featuring Crooked I)	Santana; Gotti; 7^{[a]}	4:54
3.	"Baby" (Panjabi Hit Squad mix)	Santana; Gotti; 7^{[a]}	4:32

UK 12-inch single
No.	Title	Producer(s)	Length
1.	"Rock wit U (Awww Baby)" (album version clean)	Santana; Gotti	3:38
2.	"Rock wit U (Awww Baby)" (Taz & Vanguard remix)	Santana; Gotti; Taz & Vanguard^{[a]}	4:24
3.	"Rock wit U (Awww Baby)" (JD remix)	Santana; Gotti; JD^{[a]}	3:54
4.	"Rock wit U (Awww Baby)" (Jay Hannan Lazy Dog mix)	Santana; Gotti; Jay Hannan^{[a]}	6:30

European CD single
No.	Title	Producer(s)	Length
1.	"Rock wit U (Awww Baby)" (album version clean)	Santana; Gotti	3:38
2.	"Rock wit U (Awww Baby)" (instrumental)	Santana; Gotti	3:38

Australian CD single
No.	Title	Producer(s)	Length
1.	"Rock wit U (Awww Baby)" (album version clean)	Santana; Gotti	3:38
2.	"Rock wit U (Awww Baby)" (instrumental)	Santana; Gotti	3:38
3.	"Rock wit U (Awww Baby)" (Taz & Vanguard remix)	Santana; Gotti; Taz & Vanguard^{[a]}	4:24
4.	"Rock wit U (Awww Baby)" (Jay Hannan Lazy Dog mix)	Santana; Gotti; Hannan^{[a]}	6:30

Japanese CD single
No.	Title	Producer(s)	Length
1.	"Rock wit U (Awww Baby)" (radio edit)	Santana; Gotti	3:40
2.	"Rock wit U (Awww Baby)" (album version)	Santana; Gotti	3:33
3.	"Rock wit U (Awww Baby)" (instrumental)	Santana; Gotti	3:39

Notes

- ^{^[a]} denotes additional producer

== Personnel ==
Personnel are lifted from the liner notes of Chapter II.

- Rob Bacon – guitar
- Milwaukee Buck – recording engineer
- Ashanti Douglas – vocals, writing
- Duro – mix engineering
- Terry Hubert – recording assistance
- Irving Lorenzo – mix engineering, production, writing
- Demetrius McGhee – additional keyboards
- Andre Parker – production, writing

== Charts ==
=== Weekly charts ===
Chart (2003)	Peak position
Australia (ARIA)	19
Australian Urban (ARIA)	9
Belgium (Ultratip Bubbling Under Flanders)	5
Belgium (Ultratip Bubbling Under Wallonia)	15
Canada (Nielsen SoundScan)	4
Croatia (HRT)	5
Europe (Eurochart Hot 100)	21
Germany (GfK)	41
Ireland (IRMA)	21
Netherlands (Dutch Top 40)	30
Netherlands (Single Top 100)	28
New Zealand (Recorded Music NZ)	24
Scottish Singles Sales (Official Charts)	20
Sweden (Sverigetopplistan)	54
Switzerland (Schweizer Hitparade)	33
UK Singles (Official Charts)	7
UK Hip Hop/R&B (Official Charts)	3
US Billboard Hot 100	2
US Dance Club Songs (Billboard)	6
US Dance Singles Sales (Billboard)	4
US Dance Airplay (Billboard)	12
US Hot R&B/Hip-Hop Songs (Billboard)	4
US Pop Airplay (Billboard)	5
US Rhythmic Airplay (Billboard)	2

=== Year-end charts ===
Chart (2003)	Position
UK Singles (OCC)	141
UK Urban (Music Week)	18
US Billboard Hot 100	29
US Hot R&B/Hip-Hop Singles & Tracks (Billboard)	35
US Mainstream Top 40 (Billboard)	37
US Rhythmic Top 40 (Billboard)	15

== Certifications ==
Region	Certification	Certified units/sales
New Zealand (RMNZ)	Platinum	30,000^{‡}
United Kingdom (BPI)	Gold	400,000^{‡}
^{‡} Sales+streaming figures based on certification alone.

== Release history ==
Region	Date	Format(s)	Label(s)	Ref.
United States	May 19, 2003	Contemporary hit; rhythmic contemporary; urban radio	Murder Inc.	
United Kingdom	June 16, 2003	CD	Murder Inc.	
Japan	June 25, 2003	CD	Murder Inc.	
Australia	June 30, 2003	CD	Murder Inc.	
