= Chapter II (Ashanti album) =

Studio album by Ashanti
- Released: July 1, 2003
- Recorded: 2002–2003
- Studios: Crackhouse (New York); SoundCastle Studios (Los Angeles)
- Genre: R&B
- Length: 65:04
- Labels: Murder Inc.; Def Jam
- Producers: Irv Gotti; Ashanti; Chink Santana

Ashanti chronology
7 Series Sampler (2003)	Chapter II (2003)	Ashanti's Christmas (2003)

Singles from Chapter II
- 1. "Rock wit U (Awww Baby)" Released: May 19, 2003; 2. "Rain on Me" Released: August 11, 2003; 3. "Breakup 2 Makeup" Released: 2004

Chapter II is the second studio album by American singer-songwriter Ashanti. It was released on July 1, 2003, by Murder Inc. Records and Def Jam Recordings. Ashanti reteamed with Murder Inc. head Irv Gotti and producer Chink Santana to work on the album. Chapter II features a guest appearance by rapper Ja Rule, Chink Santana, and Gunnz. Critical reception towards the album was generally mixed, with critics commending the album's autobiographical lyrics, and its fun yet light nature, while other critics felt Chapter II lacked creativity and personality and relied too heavily on the formula of her debut album (2002).

Upon its release, the album debuted at number one on the US Billboard 200 chart with first-week sales of 326,000 units. It also reached the top 10 in Canada, Switzerland, and the United Kingdom. Chapter II was eventually certified platinum by the Recording Industry Association of America (RIAA). At the 46th Annual Grammy Awards (2004), it earned Ashanti nominations for Best Contemporary R&B Album, Best Female R&B Vocal Performance, and Best R&B Song. Chapter II spawned three singles, including the Billboard Hot 100 top-10 hits "Rock wit U (Awww Baby)" and "Rain on Me", as well as "Breakup 2 Makeup".

== Promotion ==
Murder Inc. selected "Rock wit U (Awww Baby)," which they considered a continuation from her debut single "Foolish" (2002), to be released as the album's first single from Chapter 2. Issued on May 19, 2003, the song became a commercial success stateside and Ashanti's third solo top ten hit. It peaked at number two on the US Billboard Hot 100, while reaching number four on the Billboard Hot R&B/Hip-Hop Songs chart. Internationally, it was a moderate success, reaching the top five in Canada and Japan, the top ten in the United Kingdom, top twenty in Australia, and the top forty in Ireland, New Zealand, and Switzerland.

The album's second single "Rain on Me", was released on August 11, 2003. It peaked at number seven on the Billboard Hot 100 and number two on the Hot R&B/Hip-Hop Songs chart. Elsewhere, it reached the top twenty in Belgium and the United Kingdom. In 2004, "Rain on Me" earned Ashanti a Grammy Award nomination for Best Female R&B Vocal Performance. In 2004, a remix version of "Breakup 2 Makeup" featuring labelmate Black Child was released as a single. It served as the lead single from Ashanti's remix compilation album Collectables by Ashanti, released in 2005, reaching number 76 on the Hot R&B/Hip-Hop Songs.

== Critical reception ==
Professional ratings
Aggregate scores
Source	Rating
Metacritic	51/100
Review scores
Source	Rating
AllMusic	3/5 stars
Blender	2/5 stars
Entertainment Weekly	B−
Mojo	3/5 stars
PopMatters	6/10 stars
Q	1.5/5 stars
Rolling Stone	2/5 stars
The Rolling Stone Album Guide	1.5/5 stars
Slant Magazine	2/5 stars
The Village Voice	C

Chapter II received mixed reviews from music critics. At Metacritic, which assigns a normalized rating out of 100 to reviews from mainstream publications, the album received an average score of 51, based on 11 reviews, indicating "mixed or average" reviews. The New York Times writer Kelefa Sanneh remarked that Chapter II "isn't perfect, but once you edit out the skits (which are, without exception, excruciating), you're left with an album that's graceful, beguiling and above all, light, in the best sense of the word." People magazine noted that "the singer's sophomore CD, though, proves wrong those who thought she would be a one-hit-album wonder. Chapter II, which continues the same hip-hop soul theme as her self-titled debut, is the equivalent of a good beach read: It's easy, breezy listening that doesn't require much brainpower."

Billboard wrote that Chapter II "doesn't stray too far from its predecessor" and complimented the autobiographical songs on the album. Ernest Hardy from Rolling Stone found that the "album is filled with the same beat-driven, slickly produced midtempo tracks and ballads that made up her debut [and] the disc's best moments have a decidedly old-school feel to them [...] Still, dullard schoolgirl insights into love and heartache dominate the album; add some boring between-song skits about 'haters,' and Chapter II wears thin long before its halfway mark." While he complimented Ashanti for her writing credits on the album, Entertainment Weekly journalist Tom Sinclair felt that "Chapter II is too mired in tired R&B conventions to achieve true magnificence."

Allmusic editor Stephen Thomas Erlewine found that "the songs have about as much personality as Ashanti's voice, but that actually is a point in its favor, since it keeps everything on an even keel and makes Gotti and Santana's stylish production the star. They are the secret ingredients that make Chapter II good romantic mood music for the summer." Alexa Camp from Slant Magazine wrote that "the album's got some great tunes, but they'd be better suited for someone like Mary J. Blige, whom Shany & Co. bite off." Robert Christgau gave Chapter II a "C" rating in his review for The Village Voice, calling it a "pathologically modest follow-up." PopMatters from Maurice Bottomley assured that "Chapter 2 is not going to feature as any scribe's R&B album of the year."

== Commercial performance ==
In the United States, Chapter II debuted at number one on the Billboard 200 with first-week sales of 326,000 units sold. While it became Ashanti's second chart topper, it was a considerable decline from her previous effort Ashanti, which had opened to sales of 502,500 units in April 2002. In total, it remained on the Billboard 200 chart for 30 consecutive weeks. In addition, it reached the top position on Billboard's Top R&B/Hip Hop Albums chart, where it stayed at the top spot for two consecutive weeks. On August 14, 2003, The album was certified platinum by the Recording Industry Association of America (RIAA). Towards the end of 2003, Billboard ranked the album at number 54 and 27 respectively on its Billboard 200 and Top R&B/Hip-Hop Albums year end chart lists. By January 2005, Chapter II had sold 1.5 million copies, according to Nielsen SoundScan.

Elsewhere, Chapter II reached the top five on the Canadian and UK Singles Chart. It was certified gold by the British Phonographic Industry (BPI), indicating sales in excess of 100,000 copies, and also went gold in Japan. In Switzerland, it reached the top ten, debuting and peaking at number nine on the Swiss Albums Chart, making it Ashanti's highest-charting album to date. Chapter II also entered the top 20 in Australia and Germany. To date, the album has sold 3 million copies worldwide.

== Track listing ==
Chapter II track listing
No.	Title	Writer(s)	Length
1.	"Intro (Medley)"	Ashanti Douglas; Andre Parker; Irving Lorenzo; Marcus Vest; Etterlene Jordan; Mark DeBarge; Raymond Calhoun; Mike Dean; Brad Jordan; Thom Bell; Linda Creed; Jeffrey Atkins; Tiffany Lane; Roger Troutman; Larry Troutman	1:18
2.	"Shany's World" (featuring Chink Santana)	Douglas; Parker; Lorenzo	3:05
3.	"Rock wit U (Awww Baby)"	Douglas; Parker; Lorenzo	3:29
4.	"What Are They Gonna Say Now" (Skit)		0:31
5.	"Breakup 2 Makeup"	Douglas; Parker; Lorenzo	3:41
6.	"I Found Lovin'"	Johnny Flippin; Michael L. Walker	4:15
7.	"Rain on Me"	Douglas; Parker; Lorenzo; Burt Bacharach; Hal David	4:57
8.	"Then Ya Gone" (featuring Chink Santana)	Douglas; Parker; Lorenzo; Ernie Isley; Marvin Isley; O'Kelly Isley Jr.; Rudolph Isley; Ronald Isley; Chris Jasper	4:59
9.	"Living My Life"	Douglas; Parker; Lorenzo	3:46
10.	"Black Child" (Skit)	Douglas; Parker; Lorenzo; Ramel Gills	1:28
11.	"Feel So Good"	Douglas; Parker; Lorenzo; Austin Johnson; Smead Hudman	4:31
12.	"Carry On"	Douglas; Parker; Lorenzo	3:15
13.	"The Sugar Shack" (Skit)		1:10
14.	"The Story of 2"	Douglas; Parker; Lorenzo; Rick James	4:33
15.	"Ohhh Ahhh"	Douglas; Parker; Lorenzo	4:36
16.	"Shany Shia" (Skit)		1:11
17.	"Sweet Baby" (featuring Ja Rule)	Douglas; Parker; Lorenzo; Vest; Atkins; Al Green	4:08
18.	"U Say, I Say" (featuring Gunnz)	Douglas; Parker; Lorenzo	4:09
19.	"I Don't Mind"	Douglas; Parker; Lorenzo	5:04
20.	"Outro" (featuring Chink Santana)	Douglas; Parker; Lorenzo	0:58
Total length:			65:04

Japan, and United Kingdom bonus track
No.	Title	Length
21.	"I Know"	4:42
Total length:		69:46

Japan bonus track
No.	Title	Length
22.	"I'm Not Scared"	4:13
Total length:		73:59

Samples

- "Intro (Medley)" contains samples of Ashanti tracks "Foolish", "Happy", "Down 4 U" (with Ja Rule, Charli Baltimore & Vita), "Baby" and "Mesmerize" (with Ja Rule).
- "Breakup 2 Makeup" contains a sample of "I'm Gonna Love You Just a Little More Baby" by Barry White.
- "Rain on Me" contains a sample of "Look of Love" by Isaac Hayes.
- "Then Ya Gone" contains samples of "Ain't I Been Good to You" by The Isley Brothers, and "One Day" by UGK.
- "Feel So Good" contains a sample of "Playing Your Game, Baby" by Barry White.
- "The Story of 2" contains a sample of "Dream Maker" by Rick James.
- "Sweet Baby" contains a sample of "I'm Glad You're Mine" by Al Green.
- "U Say I Say" contains a sample of "Never Enough" by Groove Theory.
- "I Found Lovin'" is a cover of the same-titled song by Fatback Band.

== Personnel ==
- Ashanti Douglas – lead and background vocals (1, 3, 5, 7, 8, 9, 11–12, 14, 15, 17, 18, 19), executive producer
- Robert Bacon – guitar (3, lead on 5, 7, 14, 19), bass guitar (5, 7, 14), additional keyboards (15)
- Black Child – rap vocals (10)
- Irv Gotti – producer (all tracks), audio mixing (1–3, 5–12, 14–15, 18–20), additional vocals (3–4, 19), executive producer
- Gunnz – background vocals (18)
- Ja Rule – rap vocals (1, 17)
- Demetrius McGhee – piano solo (13), additional keyboards (2–3, 6, 9, 14)
- Marquies "Keez" Parker – bass guitar (8)
- Chink Santana – producer (all tracks), vocals (13, lead on 2, 8, 20), additional vocals
- Shia - vocals (16)
- Milwaukee Buck – recording engineer (1–3, 5–12, 14–15, 17–18, 20), audio mixing (1, 20)
- Duro – audio mixing (2–3, 5–12, 14–15, 17–19)
- Daniela Federici – photography
- Brian "Big Bass" Gardner – mastering
- Terri "Murda Mac" Hubert – assistant engineer (1–3, 5–12, 14–15, 18, 20)
- JJ – make-up
- Rosie Michel – stylist
- Rick Patrick – creative director
- Shereese Slate – hair stylist
- Laura Tamburino – art producer
- Tony Vanias – recording director
- Andy West – art direction

== Charts ==
=== Weekly charts ===
Weekly chart performance for Chapter II
Chart (2003)	Peak position
Australian Albums (ARIA)	19
Australian Urban Albums (ARIA)	4
Austrian Albums (Ö3 Austria)	65
Canadian Albums (Billboard)	5
Dutch Albums (Album Top 100)	26
European Top 100 Albums (Music & Media)	7
French Albums (SNEP)	62
German Albums (Offizielle Top 100)	12
Japanese Albums (Oricon)	9
New Zealand Albums (RMNZ)	22
Scottish Albums (Official Charts)	25
Swiss Albums (Schweizer Hitparade)	9
UK Albums (Official Charts)	5
UK R&B Albums (Official Charts)	2
US Billboard 200	1
US Top R&B/Hip-Hop Albums (Billboard)	1

=== Year-end charts ===
Year-end chart performance for Chapter II
Chart (2003)	Position
UK Albums (OCC)	156
US Billboard 200	54
US Top R&B/Hip-Hop Albums (Billboard)	27

== Certifications ==
Certifications for Chapter II
Region	Certification	Certified units/sales
Japan (RIAJ)	Gold	100,000^{^}
United Kingdom (BPI)	Gold	100,000^{^}
United States (RIAA)	Platinum	1,000,000^{^}
^{^} Shipments figures based on certification alone.

== See also ==
- List of Billboard 200 number-one albums of 2003
- List of Billboard number-one R&B albums of 2003
