= Irv Gotti =

American record producer (1970–2025)

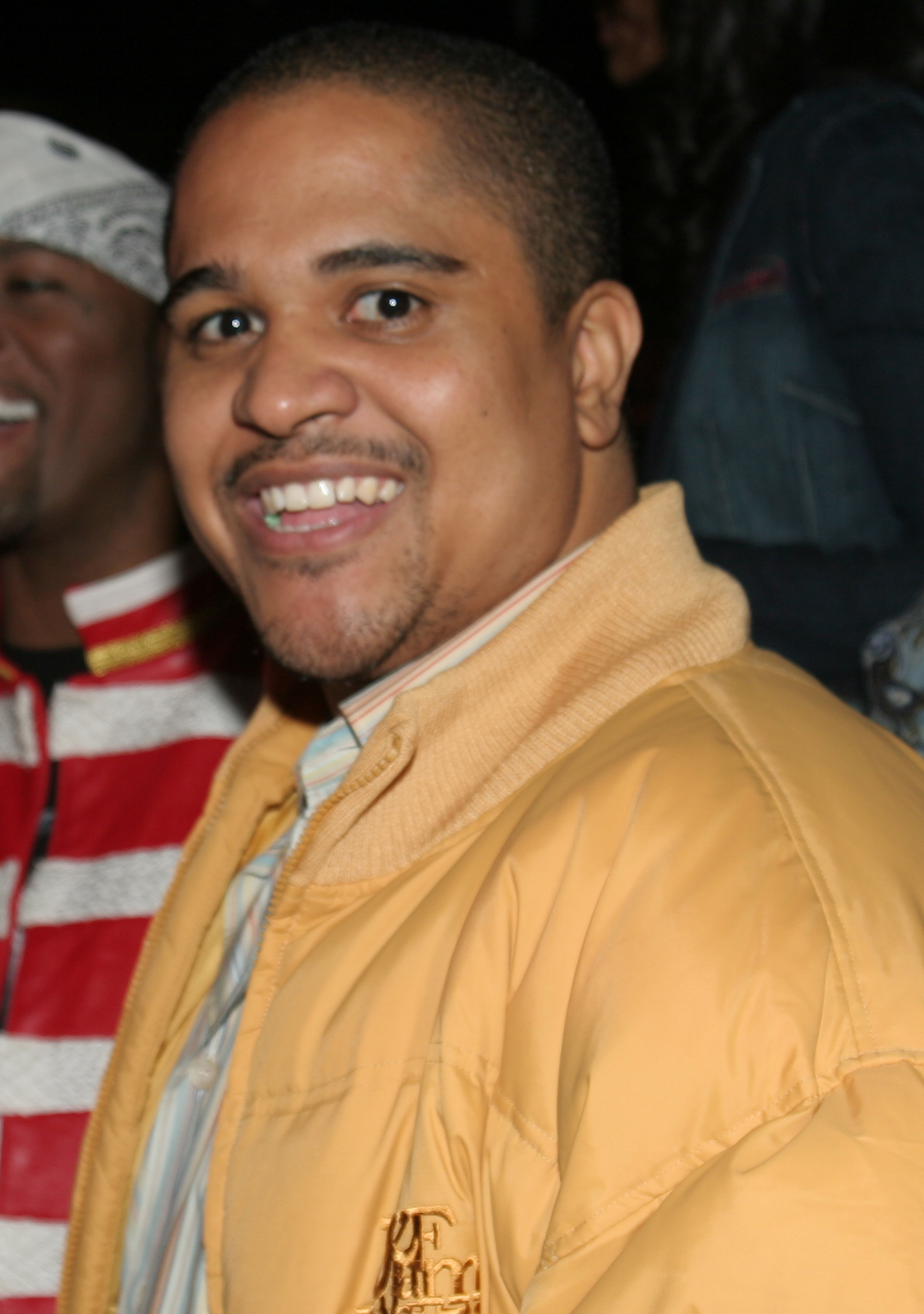
- Gotti in 2005

Background information
- Also known as: DJ Irv; Gotti; IG
- Born: Irving Domingo Lorenzo Jr. June 26, 1970; New York City, U.S.
- Died: February 5, 2025 (aged 54) New York City, U.S.
- Genres: Hip-hop; R&B
- Occupations: Record producer; disc jockey; songwriter; record executive; television producer
- Years active: 1985–2025
- Labels: Top Dawg Productions; Blunt/TVT; Def Jam; Murder Inc.; Visionary

Irving Domingo Lorenzo Jr. (June 26, 1970 – February 5, 2025), known professionally as Irv Gotti or DJ Irv, was an American record producer and record executive. Gotti started off as a New York hip-hop DJ in the 1980s, then becoming an A&R talent scout for TVT Records in 1995 and moved to Def Jam Recordings in 1997. He co-founded the record label Murder Inc. Records with his brother Chris in 1999, which was an imprint of Def Jam. Gotti is credited with having helped discover or sign rappers Jay-Z, DMX, Vita, Charli Baltimore, and Ja Rule, as well as singers Ashanti and Lloyd.

Gotti executive produced the debut albums for DMX (It's Dark and Hell Is Hot), Ja Rule (Venni Vetti Vecci), Ashanti (Ashanti) and Lloyd (Southside). He received production credits for most of the recordings by artists signed to the label—including Ja Rule (Rule 3:36, Pain Is Love, The Last Temptation, R.U.L.E.), The Inc. (Irv Gotti Presents: The Inc.), Ashanti (Chapter II, Concrete Rose), and Lloyd (Street Love)—as well as singles for other artists such as Jennifer Lopez ("I'm Real (Murder Remix)", "Ain't It Funny (Murder Remix)"), Fat Joe ("What's Luv"), Eve ("Gangsta Lovin'"), and Kanye West ("Violent Crimes"), among others.

Rolling Stone magazine and The New York Times described Gotti as one of the architects of hip-hop and R&B fusion of the late 1990s and early 2000s, earning 28 Billboard Hot 100 hits, four went to number one on the charts. In 2002, Gotti received a Guinness World Record for having produced a Billboard Hot 100 single that held the number one position for nineteen weeks consecutively. Gotti won a Grammy Award in 2003 and was nominated once more in 2004, both were for his work with Ashanti. He won nineteen BMI Awards and was named BMI Songwriter of the Year in 2002, 2003, and 2004. He was a two time nominee for the MOBO Awards in 2002 and 2003, and was nominated for three Billboard R&B/Hip-Hop Awards in 2002 and one in 2003.

Two highly publicized incidents surrounding Gotti occurred around the turn of the century, the first being a feud between Murder Inc. and G-Unit from 1999 to 2003. The second occurred from 2002 to 2005 when the United States government opened a three-year-long investigation and trial on the relationship of the Lorenzo brothers and Murder Inc. with drug lord Kenneth McGriff, where Gotti and his brother Chris, received acquittal of money-laundering charges.

Gotti pivoted to television in the late 2000s first starring in the VH1 reality show Gotti's Way from 2007 to 2009. He was the creator of the 2017–2022 BET series Tales, which was produced through his entertainment production company, Visionary Ideas. In July 2022, he sold the rights to his master recordings, through a multi-million dollar production deal with Iconoclast. Gotti had other shows and movies in development at the time of his death.

== Early life ==
Irving Domingo Lorenzo Jr. was born in the Hollis neighborhood of Queens, New York City, on June 26, 1970. Lorenzo was of African-American and Filipino descent, though he was commonly mistaken for having Dominican heritage. His father Irving was a taxicab driver and dispatcher. He was the youngest of eight siblings, including two sisters and an older brother named Christopher, who later became known as Chris Gotti.

== Career ==
=== 1985–1996: Early career and TVT ===
Gotti's career started as a preteen when his sister Christina bought him turntables for his birthday. Under the moniker DJ Irv, he would make mixtapes with beats and DJ mixes in the family basement, selling them for $10 at local barbershops. According to rapper Jaz-O, Gotti was one of the first to do hip-hop street mixtapes. Many of his initial mixtape customers were hustlers and drug dealers, and for a brief period Gotti was a small-time dealer of both cocaine and crack cocaine. After a run in with local police, however, he left the trade. By the age of fifteen, Gotti would go on to DJ at parties at local parks and nightclubs in Queens. This caught the attention of record executive Russell Simmons, and rappers Rev Run and LL Cool J would visit his family's home as word spread.

In 1987, Gotti and Jaz-O were under the same management company Joss Productions, and Jaz-O's record label had an idea to record an album with a concept similar to DJ Jazzy Jeff & the Fresh Prince, with Gotti as the DJ, Jaz-O as the rapper and Jay-Z as the hype man. While recording the album Word to the Jaz in London in 1988, Jay-Z and Gotti began to foster their relationship on the trip. In 1988, while on a promotional tour for Jaz-O, Gotti was roommates with producer Chad Elliott, who later introduced him in Yonkers to DMX and brothers Joaquin "Waah" and Darrin "Dee" Dean, who had mentioned they were creating a company called Ruff Ryders together. In 1989, Elliott and Gotti worked on a beat called "Born Loser", which became one of DMX's first music demo's and was later released as his debut single in 1992. Producer Large Professor later taught Gotti how to produce on a E-mu SP-12 and Akai S950 while recording the 1991 remix for "It's a Boy" by Slick Rick.

One of the first musicians he discovered was rapper Mic Geronimo at a local high school talent show. Gotti, under the moniker DJ Irv, produced and independently distributed the 1993 recording of "Shit's Real" by Mic Geronimo; the single was re-released in 1994 under Blunt/TVT. This helped Gotti secure a job as a talent scout in the A&R department at the record label, where he was hired by Steve Gottlieb in 1995. During his time at TVT, he signed Mic Geronimo and Queens-based rap group Cash Money Click, of which rapper Ja Rule was a member, after discovering them in 1991. Gotti produced songs on Mic Geronimo's 1995 debut album The Natural, which rap supergroup Murder Inc. consisting of DMX, Ja Rule, and Jay-Z was first featured on the song "Time to Build". Gotti convinced Waah to buy him a Akai MPC60 drum machine to produce records for DMX, which resulted in the 1995 single "Make a Move".

In 1995, Jay-Z claimed DJ Irv to be "The Don of Hip-Hop", giving him the moniker Irv Gotti, which was inspired by mobster John Gotti. Gotti later produced the song "Can I Live" from Jay-Z's 1996 debut album, Reasonable Doubt, and helped service "Ain't No Playa" to radio. He also acted as Jay-Z's tour DJ, and helped create the joint venture between Roc-A-Fella Records and Def Jam in 1997.

=== 1997–2005: Def Jam and Murder Inc. era and trial ===
In 1997, DMX was featured on the album Vendetta by Mic Geronimo which Gotti executive produced. The same year, as Blunt Recordings was folding, Gotti left TVT to become an A&R for Def Jam Recordings. In May 1997, through Gotti, Def Jam signed DMX. Initially, there was a dispute over signing DMX and Gotti had threatened to leave the company if they did not follow through with signing him. Gotti, as executive producer, oversaw DMX's first studio album, It's Dark and Hell is Hot, which was released on May 12, 1998. The album debuted and peaked atop the Billboard 200 and sold over 250,000 copies in its first week. The album went on to sell four million copies in the United States, being certified quadruple platinum by the RIAA, and sold five million copies worldwide.

Gotti was an A&R for Def Jam on the 1997 albums Back in Business by EPMD, How to Be a Player soundtrack and the 1998 albums Flesh of My Flesh, Blood of My Blood by DMX, the Belly soundtrack, and the Rush Hour soundtrack. One of his last major singles produced under solely Def Jam was "Hot Spot" by Foxy Brown. Gotti turned down demo tapes from a young 50 Cent in 1997 suggesting his sound was too similar to Jay-Z after Jam Master Jay had shown the songs for a potential record deal. 50 Cent would be featured in his first studio release on the 1998 single "React" for the Onyx album Shut 'Em Down which Gotti was the A&R for. He also advised a young Pitbull in 1998 to focus on writing records instead of only freestyle rapping. In 1998, Gotti co-produced his first Hot 100 single, which was Jay-Z's "Can I Get A..." featuring Ja Rule and Amil.

After helping Def Jam with the success of Jay-Z and the pending development of DMX, the label had grown over $100 million in value, and from 1997 to 1998 Lyor Cohen planned to give Gotti his own label under Def Jam, which he co-founded with his brother Chris in 1999. While watching Biography on A&E during gangster week, Gotti saw a Murder, Inc. logo appear on the screen and decided to use the name for his label because Murder, Inc. put out hits for murder and Gotti wanted to put out hit records. The label was given $3 million to start up with, and an additional $5 million more in label advances after renegotiation. Prior to the label's founding, Gotti was first earning $30,000 a year in salary and later $60,000 annually.

The first album released under Murder Inc. was Ja Rule's 1999 debut album, Venni Vetti Vecci. Gotti was the album's executive producer and oversaw the development of the entire album. The album's single "Holla Holla" earned Ja Rule his first top 40 Hot 100 hit. Gotti also executive produced Ja Rule's second studio album, Rule 3:36. Gotti contributed to a majority of the album soundtrack for The Fast and the Furious, while his brother Chris co-executive produced the album. He also contributed to the soundtrack for Romeo Must Die and executive produced Irv Gotti Presents: The Murderers. From 1999 to 2003, Gotti, Ja Rule, and Murder Inc. were all involved in a well-publicized feud with G-Unit Records, Aftermath Records, and Shady Records over the history between 50 Cent and Ja Rule.

Gotti met Ashanti through a mutual friend; initially, he had too many projects to also work on her music but invited her to visit the studio while he executive produced on Ja Rule's 2001 album Pain Is Love. After months of being around the studio together, Ashanti was placed on the 2001 single "How We Roll" by Big Pun. The 2001 single "I'm Real (Murda Remix)" by Jennifer Lopez was Gotti’s first number one on the Hot 100. Following this, her "Ain't It Funny" remix, as well as Ja Rule's "Always on Time" featuring Ashanti, went to number one on the Hot 100. Ashanti's Gotti-produced 2002 debut single "Foolish" was their second number one together. "What's Luv" by Fat Joe featuring Ashanti was released a week prior and peaked at number two. In 2003, Ashanti and Gotti won the inaugural Grammy Award for Best Contemporary R&B Album for her self-titled debut, Ashanti. The following year, they were nominated for the Grammy Award for Best R&B Song with "Rock wit U (Awww Baby)".

In 2002, Gotti released Irv Gotti Presents The Inc, featuring the Murder Inc. roster. The album, executive produced by Gotti, featured the Gotti-produced hit single, "Down 4 U", which was a top 10 single on the Billboard Hot 100. Gotti executive produced the album The Last Temptation for Ja Rule, and produced the single "Rainy Dayz" for Mary J. Blige the same year. His relationship with Jay-Z soured for a brief period in 2002 when Gotti tried to sign Nas, whom Jay-Z had been feuding with, to a record deal with Murder Inc. Gotti frequently used MDMA pills over a three-year period around 2002, which caused rifts with Jennifer Lopez and Nas. Many of his notable records were made under the influence at the time. Around 2002, Gotti began to network with record executives Suge Knight and James Prince with plans to form a union and distribution company for recording artists. All three encountered legal issues simultaneously, so the concept was halted.

In January 2003, the United States government opened public investigations, which had been privately conducted during the year prior, on Gotti's and Murder Inc.'s relationship with drug lord Kenneth McGriff founder of the organized crime syndicate the Supreme Team. Due to the ongoing feuds and investigations, in December 2003, Murder Inc. changed their name to "The Inc." and did a rebrand of their website without mob imagery. During the same year Gotti executive produced Ashanti's Chapter II and Ashanti's Christmas, as well as Ja Rule's Blood in My Eye album. Gotti began working with singer Lloyd in 2004, he executive produced the albums Southside for Lloyd, R.U.L.E. for Ja Rule, and Concrete Rose for Ashanti that year.

In the first five years of inception, from 1999 to 2004, the label earned $50 million in profit from the sale of 14 million CDs. Annually, the label grossed over $100 million during this period, going on to sell over 30 million albums, and nearly a $1 billion for Universal and Island Def Jam for almost a decade. Throughout the peak run of Murder Inc., Gotti worked predominately with his Top Dawg crew of producers, which included 7 Aurelius, Chink Santana, Lil' Rob and Jimi Kendrix. Gotti's rate for a song at that time was as high as $250,000, ten years after he could command no more than $10,000 to produce a record.

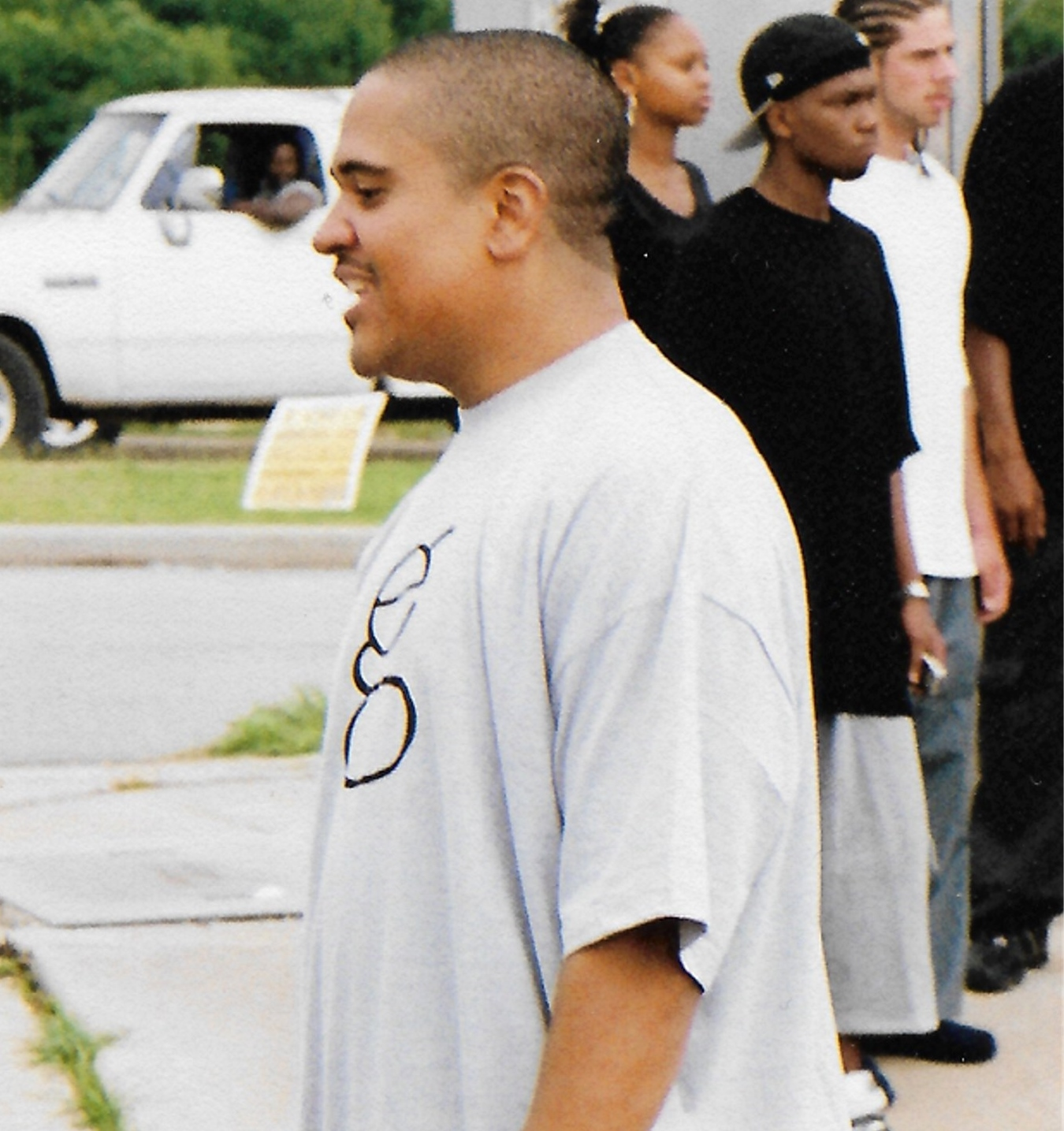
Gotti in 2004

=== 2006–2024: Comeback and decline, resurgence in television ===
After the McGriff legal cases were settled in December 2005, Universal Records offered $10 million in an advance and provisions for Gotti to buy his master recordings. Gotti had considered leaving Universal to start a new label with hedge fund manager Larry Goldfarb for $30 million. Uncertain about the potential return on investment, Goldfarb bailed out of the agreement. Gotti also considered joining Warner Music with Lyor Cohen, but after a low offer from Warner and a counteroffer from Universal record executive Doug Morris, Gotti stayed with Universal. Gotti also dealt with contract disputes related to Lloyd in the same year. Production for Gotti's first television show Gotti's Way began in 2006.

Under The Inc. banner, Gotti moved the label to Universal Motown and signed Vanessa Carlton, executive producing with Stephan Jenkins her third album, Heroes & Thieves, which was released in October 2007. Lloyd released the album Street Love the same year and Lessons in Love the following year; both were executive produced by Gotti. Gotti starred in a television reality series produced by VH1 called Gotti's Way from 2007 to 2009. Gotti and the Inc. cut ties with Ashanti in May 2009 and parted ways with Lloyd in September 2009. After The Inc.'s distribution deal ended in 2009, the label started to struggle as more artists and in-house producers left. Gotti had offered to sign rapper Nicki Minaj but she countered with an offer for him to become her manager which he declined; he later helped inspire her to write the 2010 single "Moment 4 Life".

In 2011, Gotti unsuccessfully campaigned to become the president of Def Jam, abandoning projects for Shyne and The Diplomats. In 2012, Gotti executive produced Ja Rule's Pain Is Love 2 album. In September 2013, Murder Inc. was relaunched as an umbrella label under Gotti's new label, Visionary.

Gotti began production on the BET show Tales in 2016. The show premiered in June 2017. In May 2017, Gotti and 300 Entertainment announced a partnership. In 2018, Gotti co-produced the songs "Violent Crimes" and "Brothers" by Kanye West.

In July 2022, Gotti signed a distribution deal with Kevin Liles' 300 Elektra Entertainment. That same month, Gotti sold his fifty percent ownership stake in the master recordings of Murder Inc. to brand management and music rights company Iconoclast for $100 million. Another $200 million as a line of credit was included to produce film and television projects for his company, Visionary Ideas Entertainment. He was in the process of creating a show called Double Threat and turning the TV show Tales into a movie, Tales Presents: We Made it in America, which included a theme song by Jay-Z, Kanye West, and Frank Ocean. Gotti also secured a development deal with Viacom/CBS, which included BET and Showtime at the time. In August 2022, BET released a five-part documentary which Gotti starred in, titled The Murder Inc Story, detailing the history of the record label, the FBI investigations, and the feuds of the era. In August 2024, Gotti announced he was producing a biopic on DMX.

== Legal issues ==
=== United States v. Irving Lorenzo, et al. (2003–2005) ===
On January 3, 2003, federal agents of the DOJ, IRS, and New York Police Department investigators raided the headquarters of Murder Inc., located at One Worldwide Plaza in Midtown Manhattan, after a $65 million check from Universal Music was written. The raid was part of a year-long investigation into the connection between the Lorenzo brothers and American drug lord Kenneth "Supreme" McGriff. Investigators believed that the Lorenzos used over $1 million in drug money supplied by McGriff to launch Murder Inc. as a way to launder the illegal funds. Investigators also believed the brothers helped McGriff launder drug money through the making of the 2003 film Crime Partners. Although computers and documents were seized, no charges were immediately filed, and no arrests were immediately made. The probe was handled by prosecutors Carolyn Pokorny, Richard Weber, and Tracy Dayton. A week after the FBI seized bank accounts of companies related to the production and soundtrack of the film Crime Partners 2000 and two weeks later subpoenas for financial documents from Universal were requested. At the time Lorenzo was represented by law firm Kaye Scholer.

Chris and Irv "Gotti" Lorenzo's history with McGriff dated back to around 1995 at Irv's first music video shoot across the street from a Kentucky Fried Chicken McGriff frequented. When McGriff, newly paroled from prison, met Chris and Irv through a mutual friend. McGriff wanted to go into film production and sought help from the Lorenzo brothers to produce and direct a film based on Donald Goines' novel Crime Partners he had read while in jail. The Lorenzos from then on maintained a friendship with McGriff, helping initially finance for $250,000-300,000 then a $500,000 advance on a $1 million soundtrack deal for the dream film project, Crime Partners 2000. The film which credited McGriff as producer and co-writer, was released direct-to-video, and featured appearances by Ja Rule, Charli Baltimore, Snoop Dogg, and Ice-T.

On January 25, 2005, the Lorenzos, talent manager Ronald Robinson, and bookkeeper Cynthia Brent surrendered to authorities in New York City and were officially charged with money laundering and conspiracy to launder money. The brothers were released on $1 million bonds after putting up their parent's home to receive the funds. The trial was presided over by judge Edward Korman. A task force was created by the office of Roslynn Mauskopf with Raymond Kelly, Pasquale D'Amuro, Michael J. Thomas, and William G. McMahon. During the trial, Irv was represented by Gerald B. Lefcourt, and Chris was represented by Gerald Shargel, if convicted the brothers and the two Murder Inc staff members each could have faced a maximum of 20 years in prison. On December 2, 2005, the Lorenzos received acquittal from all charges. Legal fees were in excess of $10 million.

=== Jane Doe v. Irving Domingo Lorenzo Jr. (2024) ===
In July 2024, a lawsuit was filed in Miami-Dade by a Jane Doe plaintiff against Lorenzo, alleging that he sexually assaulted and abused her over a two-year relationship between 2020 and 2022 in Saint Martin, Miami, and Atlanta. The woman alleged they had met at a poker tournament in the summer of 2020. The complaint alleged that, during a January 2022 trip to a hotel in Miami, Lorenzo forced her to perform oral sex in an elevator at a Four Seasons hotel, and again in an Uber during a subsequent trip to Atlanta later that year.

== Personal life and death ==
From 2003 to 2013, Lorenzo was married to his wife Debra (also known as Debbie). The couple had two sons and a daughter together. Lorenzo claimed he had romantically dated Ashanti while separated from his wife, which the singer denied, though she did confirm they were casually dating at one point. The two had a tumultuous relationship with communication breaking down in 2009 when Ashanti left The Inc.

Lorenzo had two properties in Encino, California, and had previously owned homes in Sherman Oaks and in New Rochelle.

Lorenzo, who was diabetic, avoided hospitals and doctors for years, and struggled to take insulin and change his diet. In 2024, Lorenzo suffered a minor stroke, as a result of his diabetes, which caused him to walk with a cane. On February 5, 2025, he died in New York City at the age of 54, from a hemorrhagic stroke he suffered after eating American Chinese food and playing poker with friends the night before his death.

== Discography ==
=== Singles produced ===
- 1994
  - "Shit's Real" (Mic Geronimo)
- 1998
  - "Can I Get A..." (Jay-Z featuring Amil & Ja Rule)
  - "Hot Spot" (Foxy Brown)
- 1999
  - "What's My Name" (DMX)
  - "Holla Holla" (Ja Rule)
- 2000
  - "Come Back in One Piece" (Aaliyah & DMX)
  - "Between Me and You" (Ja Rule featuring Christina Milian)
- 2001
  - "What's Luv?" (Fat Joe featuring Ashanti & Ja Rule)
  - "I'm Real (Murder Remix)" (Jennifer Lopez featuring Ja Rule)
  - "Ain't It Funny (Murder Remix)" (Jennifer Lopez featuring Ja Rule & Caddillac Tah)
  - "I Cry" (Ja Rule)
  - "Always on Time" (Ja Rule featuring Ashanti)
- 2002
  - "Foolish" (Ashanti)
  - "Happy" (Ashanti)
  - "Down 4 U" (Irv Gotti featuring Ja Rule, Ashanti, Vita & Charli Baltimore)
  - "Mesmerize" (Ja Rule featuring Ashanti)
  - "Rainy Dayz" (Mary J. Blige featuring Ja Rule)
  - "Gangsta Lovin" (Eve featuring Alicia Keys)
- 2003
  - "Rock wit U (Awww Baby)" (Ashanti)
  - "Rain on Me" (Ashanti)
- 2004
  - "Breakup 2 Makeup" (Ashanti featuring Black Child)
  - "Wonderful" (Ja Rule featuring Ashanti and R. Kelly)
- 2018
  - "Violent Crimes" (Kanye West)
- 2019
  - "Brothers" (Kanye West featuring Charlie Wilson)
