= Chink Santana =

American R&B musician

- Born: Andre Parker; Washington, D.C.
- Genres: R&B, hip hop
- Years active: 2000 -present
- Label: Murder Inc.

Andre Parker, known by his stage name Chink Santana, is an American R&B record producer from Washington, D.C. He is known for co-producing albums including Ashanti (2002), by singer of the same name, as well as its follow-up, Chapter II (2003). He also co-wrote and produced tracks on Judgement Days (2005), the second album by English singer Ms. Dynamite.

He guest appeared on Jim Jones' 2009 single "Perfect Day", having also co-produced several of Jones' albums beginning with Hustler's P.O.M.E. (Product of My Environment) (2006).

== Early career ==
Originally from Washington, D.C., Santana was an original member of the rap group CCOC (Cap City Outzyda Clique) and a member of the Junkyard Band. Chris Gotti, brother of Irv Gotti, of Murder Inc. Records heard an independent release by CCOC and, impressed with Santana's production work, brought him into the record label.

== Cameos and featured appearances ==
He co-starred with Keyshia Cole in her "I Should Have Cheated" music video as her cheating boyfriend. Santana also appeared as singer Ashanti's love interest in the music video for her single "Don't Let Them".

== Production credits ==
=== 2002 ===
Ashanti – Ashanti

- Intro
- Happy
- Scared
- Baby
- Over

More Than a Woman – Toni Braxton

- Me & My Boyfriend

=== 2003 ===
Chapter II – Ashanti

- Intro/Medley
- Shany's World
- Rock Wit U (Awww Baby)
- Breakup 2 Makeup
- Rain On Me
- Then Ya Gone
- Living My Life
- Black Child (Skit)
- Feel So Good
- Carry On
- The Story of 2
- Ohhh Ahhh
- U Say, I Say
- I Don't Mind
- Outro

Ashanti's Christmas – Ashanti

- Christmas Time Again

=== 2004 ===
Southside – Lloyd

- Feelin You
- Hustler

Concrete Rose – Ashanti

- So Hot

=== 2005 ===
The Way It Is – Keyshia Cole

- Situations

Judgement Days – Ms. Dynamite

- Judgement Day
- Father
- Put Your Gun Away
- You Don't Have To Cry
- Unbreakable
- Gotta Let It Go
- She Don't Live Here Anymore

Exodus – Ja Rule

- Thug Lovin'
- Mesmerize
- Exodus (Outro)

=== 2006 ===
Hustler's P.O.M.E. (Product of My Environment) – Jim Jones

- So Harlem
- Emotionless
- Get It Poppin'
- I Know

=== 2007 ===
Mixtape Messiah 3 – Chamillionaire

- Rain

=== 2008 ===
The Mirror – Ja Rule

- Enemy of the State
- Sing A Prayer For Me

Tha Comeback – Lil J

=== 2009 ===
Pray IV Reign – Jim Jones

- Album Intro
- Pulling Me Back
- Medicine
- Frienemies
- Precious
- Girlfriend

=== 2010 ===
Calling All Hearts – Keyshia Cole

- Take Me Away
- What You Do To Me

=== 2013 ===
Pimps in the Pulpit – Pastor Troy & Jack Trip

- Money & The Power
- See No Evil
- It Ain't My Fault
- Honey
- Precious Girl
- Feds Is Comin

=== 2018 ===
Pimps in the Pulpit 2 – Pastor Troy & Jack Trip

- Respect The Block
- Rep Ur City
- 400 Degreez
- Money & Power
- You Don't Want It
- Oou

== Filmography ==
Television
Year	Title	Role	Notes	Ref
2015	Love & Hip Hop: New York	Himself	Supporting cast	
