= Channel 7 (musician) =

American musician and record producer

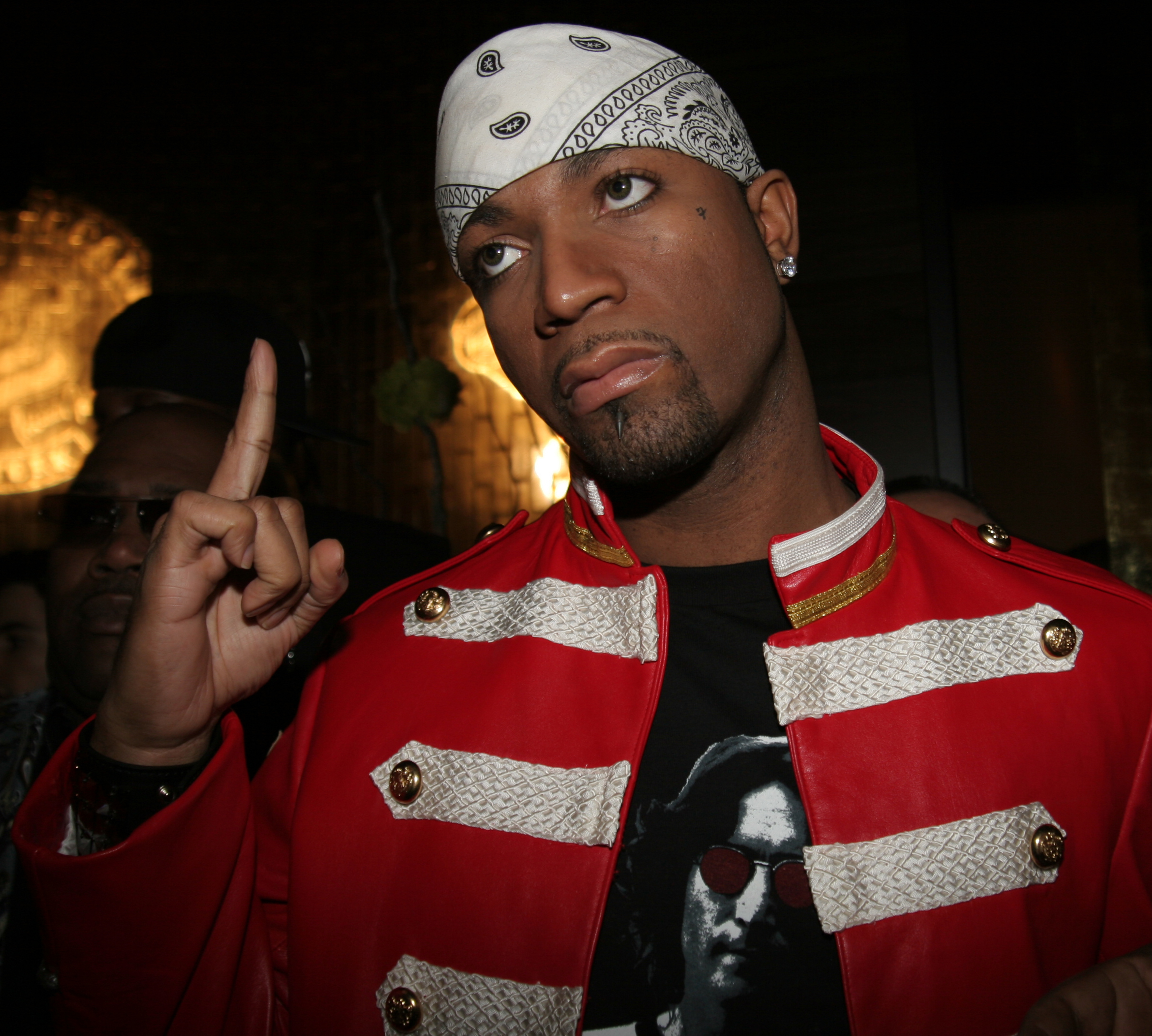
- Vest in 2005

Background information
- Also known as: 7 Aurelius
- Born: Marcus Vest
- Origin: Lexington, Kentucky, U.S.
- Genres: R&B; hip hop; soul
- Occupations: Musician; record producer; songwriter; rapper
- Instruments: Vocals; guitar; bass guitar
- Years active: 2001–present
- Labels: The Aurelius Group; Def Jam; Interscope; Atlantic; Universal

Marcus Vest, known by his stage names Channel 7 and 7 Aurelius, is an American musician, record producer, rapper and songwriter.

== Life and career ==
Vest learned how to play drums at a Pentecostal church growing up. His career started with Rap-A-Lot Records and shifted labels to work with Irv Gotti and Murder Inc. Records. Vest later went independent as the Aurelius Group.

== Awards ==
- Grammy Best Contemporary R&B Album - Ashanti - Producer/ Engineer
- ASCAP Pop Music Awards
  - Songwriter of the Year ("Always on Time"/"Foolish"/"I'm Real (Murder Remix)")
  - Award-Winning Pop Songs ("Always on Time")
  - Award-Winning Pop Songs ("Foolish")
  - Award-Winning Pop Songs ("I'm Real (Murder Remix)")

== Selected production and songwriting credits ==
=== Albums ===
- Pain Is Love by Ja Rule (All instruments by 7)

=== Songs ===
==== 2001 ====
- "Lost Little Girl" by Ja Rule
- "X" by Ja Rule featuring Missy Elliott & Tweet
- "Down Ass Bitch" by Ja Rule featuring Charlie Baltimore
- "Always on Time" by Ja Rule featuring Ashanti
- "Pain Is Love" by Ja Rule
- "Never Again" by Ja Rule
- "Worldwide Gangsta" by Ja Rule
- "Smokin and Ridin" by Ja Rule
- "I'm Real (Murder Remix)" by Jennifer Lopez & Ja Rule
- "Dial M for Murder" by Ja Rule
- "The Inc." by Ja Rule
- "Ain't It Funny (Murder Remix)" by Jennifer Lopez
- "When A Man Does Wrong" by Ashanti
- "Justify My Love" by Vita featuring Ashanti
- "AM to PM (Irv Gotti' Gutta Remix)" by Christina Milian
- "The Pledge" by Irv Gotti featuring Caddillac Tah & Ashanti
- "No One Does It Better" by Irv Gotti featuring Charlie Baltimore & Ashanti
- "Good Life (Remix)" by Faith Evans featuring Ja Rule, Caddillac Tah & Vita

==== 2002 ====
- "Intro" by Ashanti
- "Foolish" by Ashanti
- "Leaving (Always On Time Part II)" by Ashanti featuring Ja Rule
- "Call" by Ashanti
- "Rescue" by Ashanti
- "Reach for the Sky" (unreleased) by Mariah Carey
- "Baby" by Ashanti
- "VooDoo" by Ashanti
- "Movies" by Ashanti
- "Unfoolish" by Ashanti featuring The Notorious B.I.G.
- "Dreams" by Ashanti
- "Rainy Dayz" by Mary J. Blige featuring Ja Rule
- "Gangsta Lovin'" by Eve featuring Alicia Keys
- "Down 4 U" by Irv Gotti featuring Ja Rule, Ashanti, Vita & Charli Baltimore
- "Irresistible Chick" by Eve
- "Subtle Invitation" by Mariah Carey
- "The Rain" by Irv Gotti featuring Ja Rule, Jody Mack & O-1
- "Thugz Mansion (7 Remix)" by 2Pac

==== 2003 ====
- "I Need A Man" by Foxy Brown featuring Celeste Scalone
- "Murder Reigns" by Ja Rule featuring Celeste Scalone
- "Waiting by Loon featuring Celeste Scalone-Stoney
- "The Pledge (Remix)" by Ja Rule featuring Nas & Ashanti
- "Intro/Meledy" by Ashanti
- "Sweet Baby" by Ashanti
- "There Goes My Heart" by Mariah Carey
- "I Wanna Kiss You" by Nicole Wray

==== 2004 ====
- "Officially Missing You" by Tamia
- "Hush" by LL Cool J featuring 7 Aurelius
- "Concrete Rose Intro" by Ashanti
- "A Message to the Fans (Skit)" by Ashanti
- "Only U" by Ashanti
- "Focus" by Ashanti
- "Love Again" by Ashanti
- "U" by Ashanti
- "Every Lil' Thing" by Ashanti
- "Don't Leave Me Alone" by Ashanti (feat. 7 Aurelius)
- "Relearn Love" by Scott Stapp (w/ 7 Aurelius and The Tea Party)

==== 2005 ====
- "Kitty Box" by Lil' Kim

==== 2007 ====
- "Lollipop" by Nicole Wray
- "M-A-K-E-L-O-V-E-T-O-M-E" 7 Aurelius featuring Vanessa Carlton
- "Here's My Number Babe" 7 Aurelius featuring Ashanti
- "Drums" by Nicole Wray
- "Hey Baby (After the Club)" by Ashanti
- "Body" by Ja Rule featuring Ashley Joi

==== 2008 ====
- "Dr. Love" by Donnie Klang
- "Just a Rolling Stone" by Donnie Klang
- "Spank Me"
- "My House - Cassie"
- "Lay It Down"
- "Just Like Magic"
- "Tonight" by Cassie
- "Things You Make Me Do" by Ashanti featuring Robin Thicke
- "The Declaration" by Ashanti
- "Ride in My Space Ship" by James Andrew
- "She Can't Love You" by Danity Kane
- "Love in stereo" Donnie Klang

==== 2010 ====
- "Strobe Lights" by Diddy-Dirty Money featuring Lil' Wayne

==== 2011 ====
- "Strange dayz" by Ja Rule feat. 7 Aurelius

==== 2012 ====
- "Pain Is Love 2" by Ja Rule (All instruments by 7)

Co production and additional programming by Roc the producer for 700 degrees

==== 2018 ====
- "Violent Crimes" by Kanye West

==== 2023 ====
- "Selecta (feat. Stefflon Don)" by Chase & Status

==== 2025 ====
- "Cocaine Nose" by Playboi Carti
