= Billboard Year-End Hot R&B/Hip-Hop Singles & Tracks of 2002 =

American music chart

This is a list of Billboard magazine's Top Hot R&B/Hip-Hop Singles & Tracks of 2002.

No.	Title	Artist(s)
1	"Foolish"	Ashanti
2	"U Don't Have to Call"	Usher
3	"Halfcrazy"	Musiq
4	"Hot in Herre"	Nelly
5	"Anything"	Jaheim featuring Next
6	"Dilemma"	Nelly featuring Kelly Rowland
7	"Always on Time"	Ja Rule featuring Ashanti
8	"Oh Boy"	Cam'ron featuring Juelz Santana
9	"Lights, Camera, Action!"	Mr. Cheeks
10	"Nothin'"	N.O.R.E.
11	"I Love You"	Faith Evans
12	"Butterflies"	Michael Jackson
13	"Addictive"	Truth Hurts featuring Rakim
14	"I Need a Girl (Part Two)"	P. Diddy and Ginuwine featuring Loon, Mario Winans, and Tammy Ruggeri
15	"Oops (Oh My)"	Tweet
16	"Move Bitch"	Ludacris featuring Mystikal and I-20
17	"What's Luv?"	Fat Joe featuring Ashanti
18	"U Got It Bad"	Usher
19	"Pass the Courvoisier, Part II"	Busta Rhymes featuring P. Diddy and Pharrell
20	"I Need a Girl (Part One)"	P. Diddy featuring Usher and Loon
21	"Still Fly"	Big Tymers
22	"Nothing in This World"	Keke Wyatt featuring Avant
23	"Someone to Love You"	Ruff Endz
24	"I Care 4 U"	Aaliyah
25	"Luv U Better"	LL Cool J
26	"Rock the Boat"	Aaliyah
27	"A Woman's Worth"	Alicia Keys
28	"Gangsta Lovin'"	Eve featuring Alicia Keys
29	"Don't You Forget It"	Glenn Lewis
30	"Gimme the Light"	Sean Paul
31	"Just a Friend 2002"	Mario
32	"Baby"	Ashanti
33	"More Than a Woman"	Aaliyah
34	"Ain't It Funny (Murder Remix)"	Jennifer Lopez featuring Ja Rule and Caddillac Tah
35	"Rainy Dayz"	Mary J. Blige featuring Ja Rule
36	"Stingy"	Ginuwine
37	"Makin' Good Love"	Avant
38	"Down 4 U"	Irv Gotti presents Ja Rule, Ashanti, Charli Baltimore, and Vita
39	"We Thuggin'"	Fat Joe featuring R. Kelly
40	"Happy"	Ashanti
41	"Work It"	Missy Elliott
42	"Good Times"	Styles P
43	"Why Don't We Fall in Love"	Amerie
44	"Dontchange"	Musiq
45	"Call Me"	Tweet
46	"Grindin'"	Clipse
47	"You Know That I Love You"	Donell Jones
48	"Welcome to Atlanta"	Jermaine Dupri featuring Ludacris
49	"What About Us?"	Brandy
50	"Rollout (My Business)"	Ludacris
51	"The Whole World"	OutKast featuring Killer Mike
52	"Bouncin' Back (Bumpin' Me Against the Wall)"	Mystikal
53	"Take Away"	Missy Elliott featuring Ginuwine and Tweet
54	"Differences"	Ginuwine
55	"Down Ass Bitch"	Ja Rule featuring Charli Baltimore
56	"Gots ta Be"	B2K
57	"Hey Ma"	Cam'ron featuring Juelz Santana, Freekey Zekey and Toya
58	"Two Wrongs"	Wyclef Jean featuring Claudette Ortiz
59	"Roc the Mic"	Beanie Sigel and Freeway
60	"Saturday (Oooh! Ooooh!)"	Ludacris featuring Sleepy Brown
61	"Lifetime"	Maxwell
62	"Break Ya Neck"	Busta Rhymes
63	"Family Affair"	Mary J. Blige
64	"Po' Folks"	Nappy Roots
65	"What If a Woman"	Joe
66	"Trade It All, Pt. 2"	Fabolous featuring P. Diddy and Jagged Edge
67	"Love of My Life (An Ode to Hip-Hop)"	Erykah Badu featuring Common
68	"No More Drama"	Mary J. Blige
69	"Full Moon"	Brandy
70	"Brotha"	Angie Stone
71	"When the Last Time"	Clipse
72	"This Woman's Work"	Maxwell
73	"Young'n (Holla Back)"	Fabolous
74	"One Mic"	Nas
75	"Gone"	NSYNC
76	"Burnin' Up"	Faith Evans featuring Missy Elliott
77	"Cleanin' Out My Closet"	Eminem
78	"Uh Huh"	B2K
79	"Without Me"	Eminem
80	"You Gets No Love"	Faith Evans
81	"Wish I Didn't Miss You"	Angie Stone
82	"Say I Yi Yi"	Ying Yang Twins
83	"Let's Stay Home Tonight"	Joe
84	"Round and Round"	Jonell featuring Method Man
85	"Awnaw"	Nappy Roots
86	"Hey Luv (Anything)"	Mobb Deep featuring 112
87	"I'd Rather"	Luther Vandross
88	"Caramel"	City High featuring Eve
89	"If I Could Go!"	Angie Martinez featuring Lil' Mo and Sacario
90	"Don't Mess with My Man"	Nivea featuring Brian and Brandon Casey
91	"Take Ya Home"	Lil' Bow Wow
92	"In da Wind"	Trick Daddy featuring Big Boi and Cee Lo Green
93	"Girls, Girls, Girls"	Jay-Z
94	"'03 Bonnie & Clyde"	Jay-Z featuring Beyoncé Knowles
95	"Part II"	Method Man & Redman
96	"Any Other Night"	Sharissa
97	"Got Ur Self a Gun"	Nas
98	"React"	Erick Sermon featuring Redman
99	"My Neck, My Back (Lick It)"	Khia
100	"Goodbye"	Jagged Edge

== See also ==
- 2002 in music
- Billboard Year-End Hot 100 singles of 2002
- Billboard Year-End Hot Rap Singles of 2002
- List of Hot R&B/Hip-Hop Singles & Tracks number ones of 2002
