= List of Billboard Hot 100 top-ten singles in 2002 =

This is a list of singles that charted in the top ten of the Billboard Hot 100 during 2002.

Ashanti scored five top ten hits during the year with "Always on Time", "What's Luv?", "Foolish", "Down 4 U", and "Happy", the most among all other artists.

== Top-ten singles ==
Key

- † – indicates Best performing song of the year
- (#) – 2002 year-end top 10 single position and rank

List of Billboard Hot 100 top ten singles which peaked in 2002
Top ten entry date	Single	Artist(s)	Peak	Peak date	Weeks in top ten
Singles from 2001
December 22	"Always on Time"	Ja Rule featuring Ashanti	1	February 23	16
December 29	"My Sacrifice"	Creed	4	February 9	11
Singles from 2002
January 5	"A Woman's Worth"	Alicia Keys	7	February 9	7
January 26	"Wherever You Will Go" (#5)	The Calling	5	March 16	11
February 2	"Hey Baby"	No Doubt featuring Bounty Killer	5	March 2	7
February 2	"In the End" (#7)	Linkin Park	2	March 30	13
February 9	"Ain't It Funny (Murder Remix)"	Jennifer Lopez featuring Ja Rule	1	March 9	15
February 23	"What About Us?"	Brandy	7	March 16	5
March 2	"7 Days"	Craig David	10	March 2	1
March 9	"Blurry" (#10)	Puddle of Mudd	5	May 11	13
March 16	"Can't Get You Out of My Head"	Kylie Minogue	7	March 23	3
March 23	"Oops (Oh My)"	Tweet featuring Missy Elliott	7	May 4	7
March 23	"What's Luv?" (#8)	Fat Joe featuring Ashanti and Ja Rule	2	April 6	14
March 30	"Foolish" (#2)	Ashanti	1	April 20	17
March 30	"Girlfriend"	'N Sync featuring Nelly	5	April 6	6
April 6	"U Don't Have to Call"	Usher	3	May 4	12
April 20	"A Thousand Miles" (#6)	Vanessa Carlton	5	May 18	15
April 27	"I Need a Girl (Part One)"	P. Diddy featuring Usher and Loon	2	May 25	11
May 4	"Don't Let Me Get Me"	Pink	8	May 11	4
May 11	"All You Wanted"	Michelle Branch	6	May 25	5
May 18	"Underneath Your Clothes"	Shakira	9	May 18	1
May 25	"The Middle"	Jimmy Eat World	5	June 22	10
May 25	"Without Me"	Eminem	2	June 29	12
June 1	"Hot in Herre" (#3)	Nelly	1	June 29	18
June 8	"Addictive"	Truth Hurts featuring Rakim	9	June 8	6
June 15	"Oh Boy"	Cam'ron featuring Juelz Santana	4	July 6	8
June 29	"Hero"	Chad Kroeger featuring Josey Scott	3	July 13	8
June 29	"I'm Gonna Be Alright"	Jennifer Lopez featuring Nas	10	June 29	5
July 13	"Complicated"	Avril Lavigne	2	August 3	16
July 13	"I Need a Girl (Part Two)"	P. Diddy featuring Tammy Ruggeri, Ginuwine, Loon, and Mario Winans	4	August 3	14
July 27	"Dilemma" (#4)	Nelly featuring Kelly Rowland	1	August 17	19
August 3	"Down 4 U"	Irv Gotti presents The Inc. featuring Ja Rule, Ashanti, Charli Baltimore and Vita	6	August 17	5
August 3	"Just a Friend 2002"	Mario	4	August 24	8
August 10	"Heaven"	DJ Sammy and Yanou featuring Do	8	August 10	2
August 10	"Nothin'"	N.O.R.E.	10	August 10	4
August 17	"Just Like a Pill"	Pink	8	August 17	7
August 24	"Gangsta Lovin'"	Eve featuring Alicia Keys	2	September 14	12
August 24	"Happy"	Ashanti	8	September 7	6
August 31	"Cleanin' Out My Closet"	Eminem	4	September 21	7
August 31	"Long Time Gone"	Dixie Chicks	7	August 31	1
September 14	"One Last Breath"	Creed	6	September 28	7
September 28	"Gotta Get thru This"	Daniel Bedingfield	10	September 28	1
October 5	"Hey Ma"	Cam'ron featuring Juelz Santana, Freekey Zekey and Toya	3	November 2	10
October 5	"A Moment Like This"	Kelly Clarkson	1	October 5	7
October 5	"Move Bitch"	Ludacris featuring Mystikal and Infamous 2.0	10	October 5	2
October 12	"Work It"	Missy Elliott	2	November 16	16
October 19	"Lose Yourself"	Eminem	1	November 9	16
October 19	"Luv U Better"	LL Cool J	4	November 16	9
October 19	"Underneath It All"	No Doubt featuring Lady Saw	3	November 23	12
November 2	"The Game of Love"	Santana featuring Michelle Branch	5	November 30	11
November 2	"Sk8er Boi"	Avril Lavigne	10	November 2	1
November 9	"Die Another Day"	Madonna	8	November 9	4
November 16	"Gimme the Light"	Sean Paul	7	December 7	6
November 23	"Jenny from the Block"	Jennifer Lopez featuring Jadakiss and Styles	3	December 7	9
December 7	"'03 Bonnie & Clyde"	Jay-Z featuring Beyoncé	4	December 28	11
December 14	"Don't Mess with My Man"	Nivea featuring Brian and Brandon Casey	8	December 21	7

=== 2001 peaks ===
List of Billboard Hot 100 top ten singles in 2002 which peaked in 2001
Top ten entry date	Single	Artist(s)	Peak	Peak date	Weeks in top ten
September 22	"Family Affair"	Mary J. Blige	1	November 3	19
October 13	"Differences"	Ginuwine	4	October 27	15
October 27	"Hero"	Enrique Iglesias	3	November 17	14
November 3	"U Got It Bad" (#9)	Usher	1	December 15	20
November 17	"How You Remind Me" † (#1)	Nickelback	1	December 22	23
December 8	"Get the Party Started"	Pink	4	December 29	12
December 15	"Whenever, Wherever"	Shakira	6	December 29	8

=== 2003 peaks ===
List of Billboard Hot 100 top ten singles in 2002 which peaked in 2003
Top ten entry date	Single	Artist(s)	Peak	Peak date	Weeks in top ten
December 7	"Air Force Ones"	Nelly featuring Kyjuan, Ali and Murphy Lee	3	January 4	10
December 21	"Beautiful"	Christina Aguilera	2	February 1	12
December 28	"Bump, Bump, Bump"	B2K featuring P. Diddy	1	February 1	11

== Artists with most top-ten songs ==
List of artists by total songs peaking in the top-ten
Artist	Numbers of songs
Ashanti	5
Ja Rule	4
Nelly	4
Usher	3
Jennifer Lopez	3
P. Diddy	3
Pink	3
Eminem	3
Loon	2
Alicia Keys	2
Creed	2
Cam'ron	2
Missy Elliott	2
No Doubt	2
Michelle Branch	2
Avril Lavigne	2
Juelz Santana	2
Ginuwine	2
Shakira	2

== See also ==
- 2002 in music
- List of Billboard Hot 100 number ones of 2002
- Billboard Year-End Hot 100 singles of 2002
