= Billboard Year-End Hot 100 singles of 2002 =

Ranking of recorded music

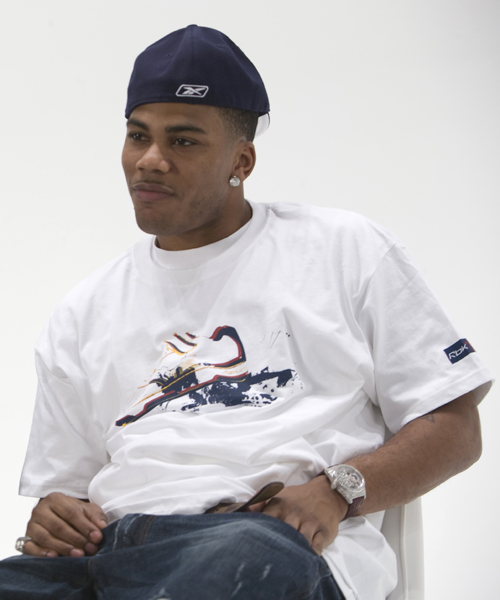
Nelly's "Dilemma" which spent 10-non consecutive weeks at number one and "Hot in Herre" which spent seven weeks atop of the chart during the summer of 2002 both ranked at number three and four respectively.

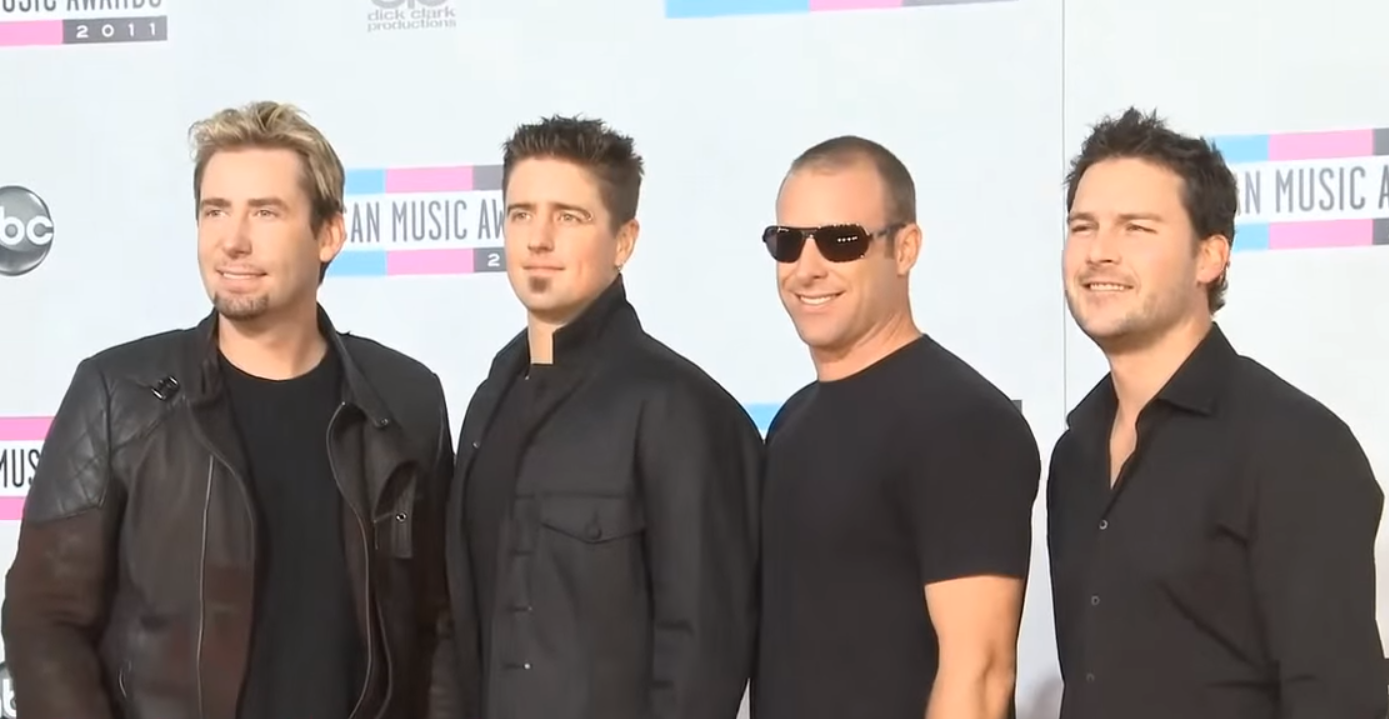
Nickelback's "How You Remind Me" which spend four weeks at number between 2001 and 2002, was the number one song of 2002.

The Billboard Hot 100 is a chart that ranks the best-performing singles of the United States. Its data, published by Billboard magazine and compiled by Nielsen SoundScan, is based collectively on each single's weekly physical as well as airplay. Throughout a year, Billboard will publish an annual list of the 100 most successful songs throughout that year on the Hot 100 chart based on the information. For 2002, the list was published on December 29, calculated with data from December 1, 2001 to November 30, 2002.

There were only nine songs that topped the Hot 100 in 2002, the second lowest number in Billboard history. Eminem's "Lose Yourself" was the longest running #1 of the year, spending 12 weeks at #1 with eight of its weeks in 2002 and another four in 2003. Ashanti's "Foolish" and Nelly's "Dilemma" both spent 10 weeks at #1.

"Lose Yourself" also held the record for the longest rap song to stay at number one; it would eventually be tied with The Black Eyed Peas's "Boom Boom Pow" in 2009 and Wiz Khalifa's "See You Again" in 2015. All three of these songs would keep the record until Lil Nas X's "Old Town Road" broke it by spending 19 weeks at #1 in 2019.

Nickelback's "How You Remind Me", which spent 4 weeks at #1 between 2001 and 2002, ended up topping the year-end list.

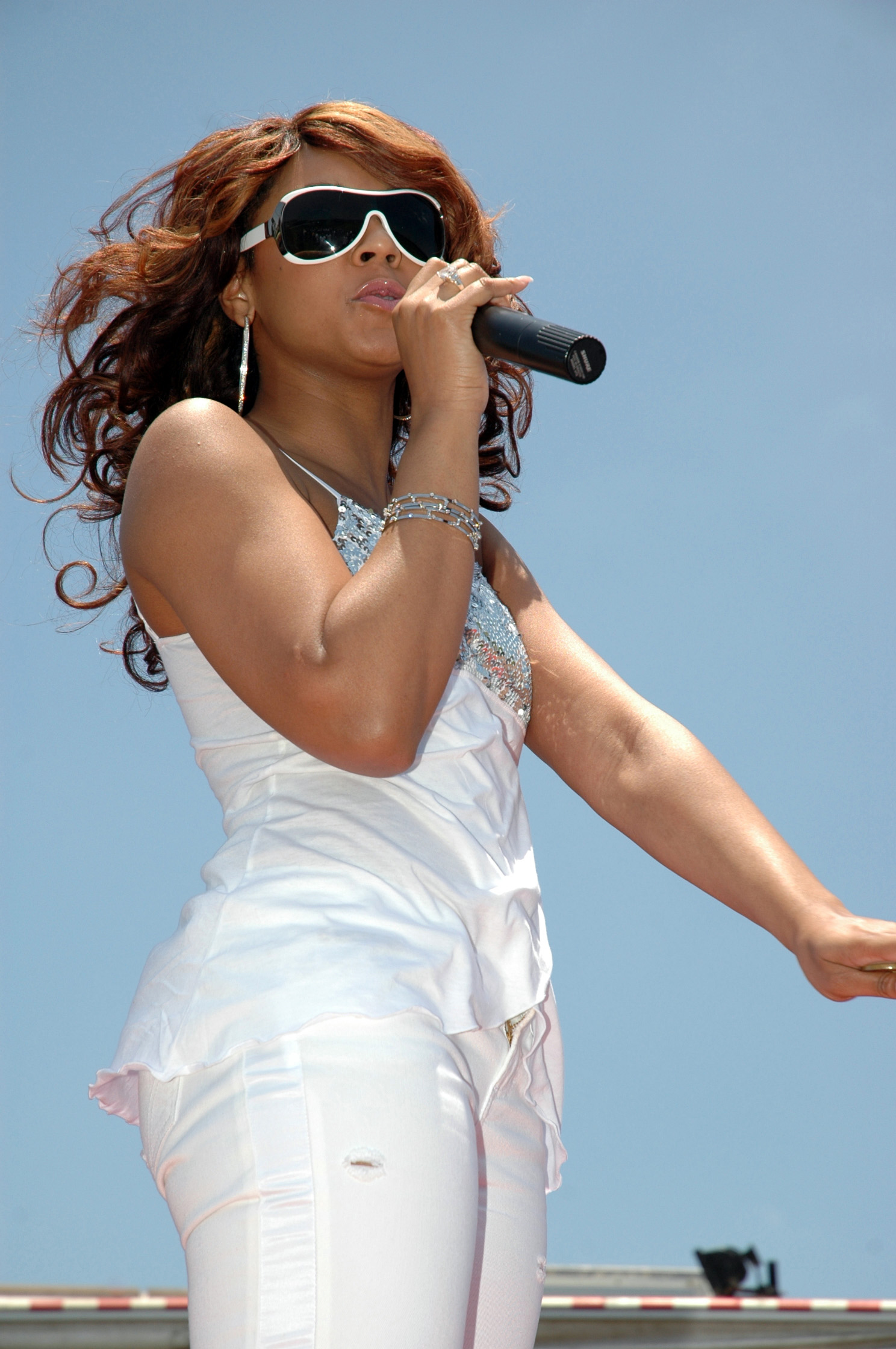
Ashanti has the most songs on this list. Two songs inside the Top 10, Her highest being "Foolish" which spent 10 weeks at number one and her collaboration with Fat Joe's "What's Luv" which ranked at number eight.

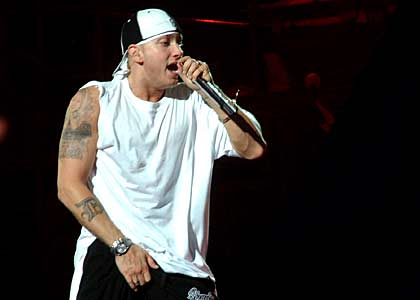
Eminem's "Lose Yourself was the longest running number one song of 2002, spending 12 weeks in total (8 in 2002 and 4 more weeks in 2003). The song won multiple Grammy Awards and has a massive legacy.

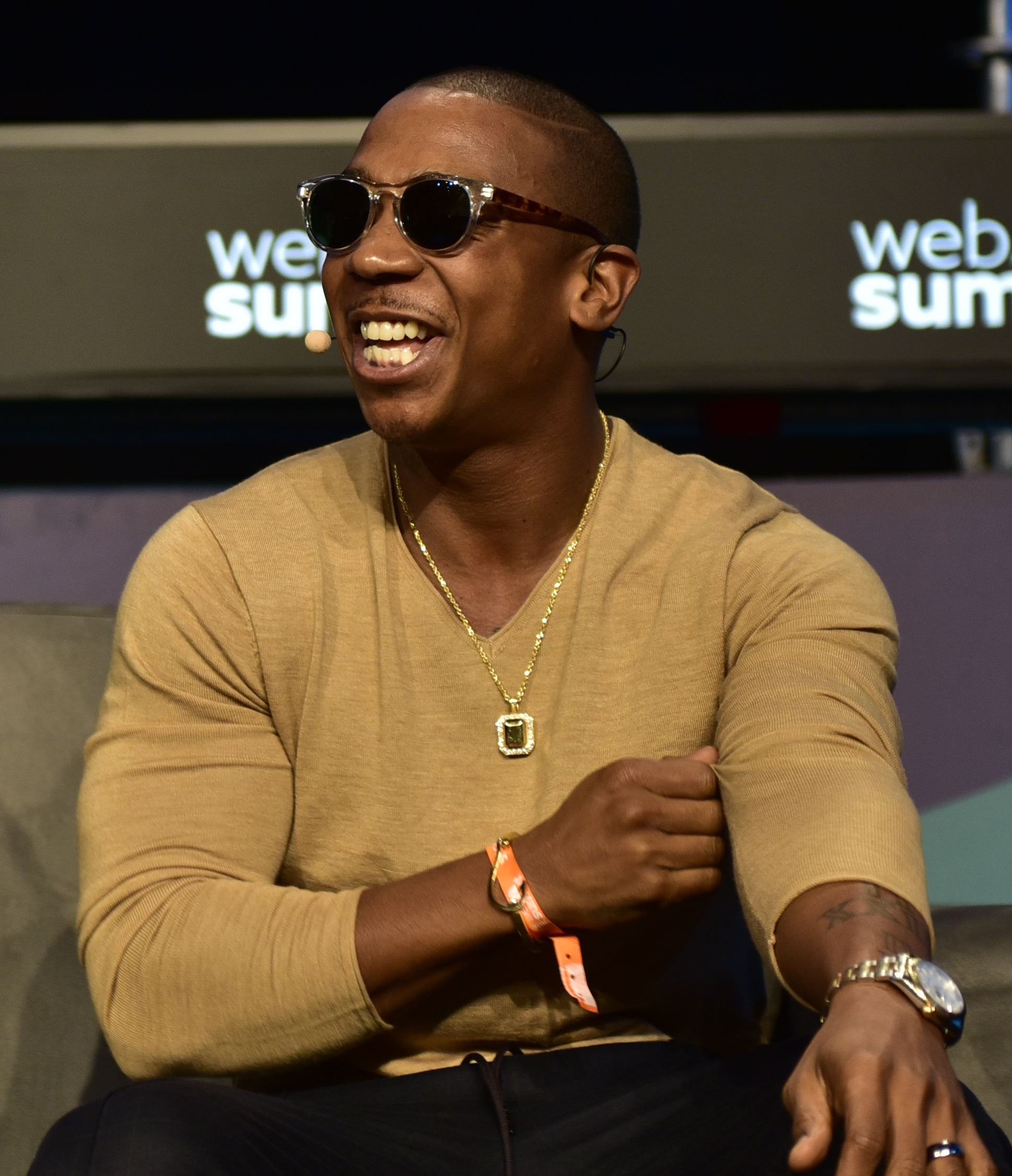

Ja Rule had multiple songs on this list. Rule earned his first number one hit "Always on Time" as a lead artist, and replaced himself on "Ain't It Funny (Murder Remix)" with Jennifer Lopez.

No.	Title	Artist(s)
1	"How You Remind Me"	Nickelback
2	"Foolish"	Ashanti
3	"Hot in Herre"	Nelly
4	"Dilemma"	Nelly featuring Kelly Rowland
5	"Wherever You Will Go"	The Calling
6	"A Thousand Miles"	Vanessa Carlton
7	"In the End"	Linkin Park
8	"What's Luv?"	Fat Joe featuring Ashanti
9	"U Got It Bad"	Usher
10	"Blurry"	Puddle of Mudd
11	"Complicated"	Avril Lavigne
12	"Always on Time"	Ja Rule featuring Ashanti
13	"Ain't It Funny (Murder Remix)"	Jennifer Lopez featuring Ja Rule
14	"The Middle"	Jimmy Eat World
15	"I Need a Girl (Part One)"	P. Diddy featuring Usher and Loon
16	"U Don't Have to Call"	Usher
17	"Family Affair"	Mary J. Blige
18	"I Need a Girl (Part Two)"	P. Diddy featuring Ginuwine, Loon and Mario Winans
19	"Gangsta Lovin'"	Eve featuring Alicia Keys
20	"My Sacrifice"	Creed
21	"Without Me"	Eminem
22	"Hero"	Enrique Iglesias
23	"All You Wanted"	Michelle Branch
24	"Get the Party Started"	Pink
25	"Hero"	Chad Kroeger featuring Josey Scott
26	"Wasting My Time"	Default
27	"One Last Breath"	Creed
28	"Whenever, Wherever"	Shakira
29	"I'm Gonna Be Alright"	Jennifer Lopez featuring Nas
30	"Oh Boy"	Cam'ron featuring Juelz Santana
31	"Heaven"	DJ Sammy featuring Yanou and Do
32	"Hey Baby"	No Doubt featuring Bounty Killer
33	"Girlfriend"	NSYNC featuring Nelly
34	"Just a Friend 2002"	Mario
35	"Soak Up the Sun"	Sheryl Crow
36	"Don't Let Me Get Me"	Pink
37	"Nothin'"	N.O.R.E.
38	"Oops (Oh My)"	Tweet featuring Missy Elliott
39	"A Moment Like This"	Kelly Clarkson
40	"Addictive"	Truth Hurts featuring Rakim
41	"Happy"	Ashanti
42	"No Such Thing"	John Mayer
43	"Just Like a Pill"	Pink
44	"Down 4 U"	Ja Rule featuring Ashanti, Charli Baltimore and Vita
45	"Can't Get You Out of My Head"	Kylie Minogue
46	"Superman (It's Not Easy)"	Five for Fighting
47	"Cleanin' Out My Closet"	Eminem
48	"Halfcrazy"	Musiq Soulchild
49	"Lights, Camera, Action!"	Mr. Cheeks
50	"Still Fly"	Big Tymers
51	"A Woman's Worth"	Alicia Keys
52	"7 Days"	Craig David
53	"Hey Ma"	Cam'ron featuring Juelz Santana and Freekey Zekey
54	"Work It"	Missy Elliott
55	"Move Bitch"	Ludacris featuring Mystikal and I-20
56	"Can't Fight the Moonlight"	LeAnn Rimes
57	"Escape"	Enrique Iglesias
58	"More Than A Woman"	Aaliyah
59	"Hella Good"	No Doubt
60	"I Love You"	Faith Evans
61	"Gotta Get thru This"	Daniel Bedingfield
62	"Pass the Courvoisier, Part II"	Busta Rhymes featuring P. Diddy and Pharrell
63	"Lose Yourself"	Eminem
64	"Butterflies"	Michael Jackson
65	"What About Us?"	Brandy
66	"Underneath Your Clothes"	Shakira
67	"Rainy Dayz"	Mary J. Blige featuring Ja Rule
68	"Differences"	Ginuwine
69	"If I Could Go!"	Angie Martinez featuring Lil' Mo and Sacario
70	"The Whole World"	Outkast featuring Killer Mike
71	"Underneath It All"	No Doubt featuring Lady Saw
72	"Caramel"	City High featuring Eve
73	"Luv U Better"	LL Cool J
74	"Gimme the Light"	Sean Paul
75	"Gone"	NSYNC
76	"Livin' It Up"	Ja Rule featuring Case
77	"Rollout (My Business)"	Ludacris
78	"Here Is Gone"	Goo Goo Dolls
79	"No More Drama"	Mary J. Blige
80	"Days Go By"	Dirty Vegas
81	"Baby"	Ashanti
82	"The Good Stuff"	Kenny Chesney
83	"We Thuggin'"	Fat Joe featuring R. Kelly
84	"Good Morning Beautiful"	Steve Holy
85	"Rock the Boat"	Aaliyah
86	"Drive (For Daddy Gene)"	Alan Jackson
87	"Standing Still"	Jewel
88	"Anything"	Jaheim featuring Next
89	"Full Moon"	Brandy
90	"Uh Huh"	B2K
91	"A New Day Has Come"	Celine Dion
92	"Turn Off the Light"	Nelly Furtado
93	"Living and Living Well"	George Strait
94	"My List"	Toby Keith
95	"Hands Clean"	Alanis Morissette
96	"Sk8er Boi"	Avril Lavigne
97	"Long Time Gone"	Dixie Chicks
98	"Where Were You (When the World Stopped Turning)"	Alan Jackson
99	"Like I Love You"	Justin Timberlake
100	"I Do!!"	Toya

== See also ==
- 2002 in music
- Billboard Year-End Hot Rap Tracks of 2002
- List of Billboard Hot 100 number-one singles of 2002
- List of Billboard Hot 100 top-ten singles in 2002
