= 7 Series Sampler: Ashanti =

EP by Ashanti
- Released: May 20, 2003
- Recorded: 2001–2002
- Studio: Crackhouse Studios (New York City, New York); SoundCastle Studios (Los Angeles, California)
- Genre: R&B
- Length: 29:11
- Label: Murder Inc.; Island Def Jam
- Producer: Irv Gotti; Chink Santana; 7 Aurelius; Jared Thomas; Reggie Wright

Ashanti chronology
Ashanti (2002)	7 Series Sampler: Ashanti (2003)	Chapter II (2003)

Professional ratings
Review scores
Source	Rating
AllMusic	3/5 stars

7 Series Sampler: Ashanti is an EP by American R&B singer Ashanti, released in the United States on May 20, 2003. The EP contains no original material, only cuts from her multi-platinum self-titled debut album. The EP peaked at number 142 on the Billboard 200 on June 21, 2003.

== Track listing ==
7 Series Sampler: Ashanti track listing
No.	Title	Writer(s)	Length
1.	"Foolish"	7Aurelius, Debarge, Douglas, Jordan, Lorenzo	3:48
2.	"Happy"	Callhoun, Douglas, Lorenzo, Parker	4:22
3.	"Baby"	7Aurelius, Dean, Douglas, Jordan, Lorenzo, Parker	4:25
4.	"Over"	Douglas, Lorenzo, Parker	5:35
5.	"Dreams"	7Aurelius, Douglas, Jordan, Lorenzo	4:15
6.	"Leaving (Always on Time, Pt.2)" (featuring Ja Rule)	7Aurelius, Atkins, Douglas, Lorenzo	3:57
7.	"Movies"	7Aurelius, Bridges, Douglas, Lorenzo, Miller, Thomas, Wiggins	4:09
Total length:			29:11

== Charts ==
=== Weekly charts ===
Chart (2003)	Peak position
US Billboard 200	142
US Top R&B/Hip-Hop Albums (Billboard)	87

== Release history ==
Region	Date	Label	Format	Catalog
United States	May 20, 2003	Murder Inc.; Island Def Jam	CD	000049402
