= Billboard Year-End Hot Rap Tracks of 2002 =

American music chart

This is a list of Billboard magazine's Top Hot Rap Tracks of 2002.

The chart was renamed from Hot Rap Singles to Hot Rap Tracks in 2002.

| No. | Title | Artist(s) |
|---|---|---|
| 1 | "Hot in Herre" | Nelly |
| 2 | "Always on Time" | Ja Rule featuring Ashanti |
| 3 | "Dilemma" | Nelly featuring Kelly Rowland |
| 4 | "What's Luv?" | Fat Joe featuring Ashanti |
| 5 | "I Need a Girl (Part Two)" | P. Diddy and Ginuwine featuring Loon, Mario Winans and Tammy Ruggeri |
| 6 | "Oh Boy" | Cam'ron featuring Juelz Santana |
| 7 | "Nothin'" | N.O.R.E. |
| 8 | "I Need a Girl (Part One)" | P. Diddy featuring Usher and Loon |
| 9 | "Gangsta Lovin'" | Eve featuring Alicia Keys |
| 10 | "Move Bitch" | Ludacris featuring Mystikal and I-20 |
| 11 | "Still Fly" | Big Tymers |
| 12 | "Pass the Courvoisier, Part II" | Busta Rhymes featuring P. Diddy and Pharrell Williams |
| 13 | "Lights, Camera, Action!" | Mr. Cheeks |
| 14 | "Down 4 U" | Ja Rule, Ashanti, Charli Baltimore and Vita |
| 15 | "We Thuggin'" | Fat Joe featuring R. Kelly |
| 16 | "Welcome to Atlanta" | Jermaine Dupri featuring Ludacris |
| 17 | "Work It" | Missy Elliott |
| 18 | "Luv U Better" | LL Cool J |
| 19 | "Rollout (My Business)" | Ludacris |
| 20 | "Hey Ma" | Cam'ron featuring Juelz Santana, Freekey Zekey and Toya |
| 21 | "The Whole World" | Outkast featuring Killer Mike and Joi |
| 22 | "Gimme the Light" | Sean Paul |
| 23 | "Good Times" | Styles P |
| 24 | "Break Ya Neck" | Busta Rhymes |
| 25 | "Down Ass Bitch" | Ja Rule featuring Charli Baltimore |

== See also ==
- 2002 in music
- Billboard Year-End Hot 100 singles of 2002
- List of Billboard number-one rap singles of 2002
