= Opposites Attract (disambiguation) =

Opposites Attract can refer to:

== Music ==
- "Opposites Attract", a song by Paula Abdul
- "Opposites Attract", a track from Black Swan: Original Motion Picture Soundtrack
- "Opposites Attract (What They Like)", a track from Jealous Ones Still Envy (J.O.S.E.)

== Television ==
- "Opposites Attract (Dexter's Laboratory)", an episode of Dexter's Laboratory
