= Ashanti (album) =

2002 studio album by Ashanti

Studio album by Ashanti
- Released: April 2, 2002
- Recorded: 2001–2002
- Studios: Crackhouse (New York); SoundCastle (Los Angeles)
- Genre: R&B
- Length: 60:59
- Labels: Murder Inc.; Def Jam
- Producers: Irv Gotti; 7 Aurelius; Chink Santana; Ashanti; Jared Thomas; Reggie Wright

Ashanti chronology
Ashanti (2002)	7 Series Sampler: Ashanti (2003)

Singles from Ashanti
- 1. "Foolish" Released: February 11, 2002; 2. "Happy" Released: June 17, 2002; 3. "Baby" Released: September 9, 2002

Ashanti is the debut studio album by American singer Ashanti. It was released on April 2, 2002, by Murder Inc. and Def Jam Recordings. The album was recorded in New York City and Los Angeles between 2001 and 2002, during the period of time where Ashanti was writing for other artists. The album features guest vocals from Gotti, Ja Rule, and the late the Notorious B.I.G. Contributions to the album's production came from a wide range of producers, including Irv Gotti, 7 Aurelius, Chink Santana, Jared Thomas and Reggie Wright.

Ashanti debuted at number one on the US Billboard 200 and the Top R&B/Hip-Hop Albums chart with first-week sales of 503,000 units, the biggest first-week sales for a debut female artist up to then. The album was certified triple platinum by the Recording Industry Association of America (RIAA) for shipments of three million copies on December 17, 2002. It earned Ashanti three Grammy Award nominations for Best New Artist, Best Female R&B Vocal Performance and Best Contemporary R&B Album, winning in the latter category. Billboard magazine ranked Ashanti at number 100 on its Top 200 Albums of the Decade. The album has sold six million copies worldwide.

The album was promoted by three singles. "Foolish" was released as the lead single from the project and peaked atop the US Billboard Hot 100. Subsequent singles "Happy" and "Baby" reached the top 10 and top 20, respectively, on the Billboard Hot 100. She also performed on several television shows and award ceremonies. Furthermore, Ashanti later opened for the North American leg for Mariah Carey's worldwide concert tour Charmbracelet World Tour.

== Background ==
When Ashanti was 14, she was discovered by P. Diddy's Bad Boy Records. Initially, she went to Bad Boy Records and sang one of Mary J. Blige's songs in front of P. Diddy and Biggie Smalls. After being impressed by her singing ability, Diddy later signed her to a development deal, but, due to a bad contract, Ashanti did not sign with Diddy. This ultimately led to a record deal with Jive Records in 1994. This relationship soured when Jive tried to make Ashanti into a pop singer. Ashanti subsequently involved herself in schoolwork, cheerleading, and running on her school's track team. She was an honor student in English and belonged to the English club where she began writing poetry. She was also in the Drama club and performed in a few plays. She put college pursuits aside when Epic Records approached her with a contract in 1998. However, the label's management changes quickly made Ashanti a low priority. She continued to perform at local New York clubs and began hanging out at the Murder Inc. recording studio, hoping for another big break.

Ashanti was first noticed by Irv Gotti because of her vocal skills. Ashanti initially asked him to produce a few demo songs for her to record so she could say she had some strong tracks by the big time producer but Gotti had a different idea. He asked her to pen hooks for his rap artists and to perform with them in duets. Ashanti provided the melodic response to their call. Ashanti was first featured as a background vocalist on rapper Big Pun's song "How We Roll". In the same year, Ashanti was featured on fellow labelmate Cadillac Tah's singles "Pov City Anthem" and "Just Like a Thug". She also appeared on the 2001 The Fast and the Furious soundtrack as a featured artist on rapper Vita's 2001 hip hop remake of Madonna's "Justify My Love" and on the solo track "When a Man Does Wrong". She appeared as a background vocalist on "I'm Real (Murder Remix)", a collaboration by labelmate Ja Rule and Jennifer Lopez (she also appeared in the music video for "Aint It Funny (Murder Remix)", the second duet between Lopez and Rule, for which she wrote and also sang background vocals on), and was featured on Fat Joe's "What's Luv?" and Ja Rule's "Always on Time". "What's Luv?" and "Always on Time" were released simultaneously and became two of the biggest hit songs of 2002. Ashanti became the first female artist to occupy the top two positions on the US Billboard Hot 100 chart simultaneously when "Always on Time" and "What's Luv?" were at numbers one and two, respectively.

== Promotion ==
The album's lead single, titled "Foolish" was released on February 11, 2002. The song became Ashanti's biggest solo successes to date, spending ten consecutive weeks on top of the US Billboard Hot 100, and Hot R&B/Hip-Hop Singles & Tracks charts. It was eventually first ranked on the US Billboard Hot 100, and Hot R&B/Hip-Hop Singles 2002 year-end charts for eleven straight weeks (Tying with Nelly's single "Dilemma", but not for eleven straights weeks). It was a breakthrough hit internationally entering the top five in the United Kingdom, the top ten in Australia, New Zealand, Canada, Germany and Japan, and the top twenty in Switzerland and the Netherlands. "Foolish" was later officially remixed, titled "Unfoolish", with guest appearances from a decease rapper The Notorious B.I.G., was released only just for radio ads.

The album's second single, "Happy" was released on June 17, 2002. The song peaked at number 8 on US Billboard Hot 100, and number 6 on the Hot R&B/Hip-Hop Songs charts. The single became Ashanti's second top ten hit as a solo artist. It was a moderate success internationally, reaching the top ten in the Netherlands, the top twenty in the United Kingdom, New Zealand, and the top forty in Australia, Ireland, Switzerland and France. The album's third single, "Baby" was released on September 9, 2002. The song peaked at number 15 on the US Billboard Hot 100, and number 7 on the Hot R&B/Hip-Hop Songs charts. The single became Ashanti's third top-twenty hit as a solo artist in her career. "Dreams" was released as a promotional single, with a live-performance music video with clips from Ashanti's career.

== Critical reception ==
Professional ratings
Review scores
Source	Rating
AllMusic	3/5 stars
Entertainment Weekly	B−
Los Angeles Times	2.5/4 stars
Pitchfork	7.2/10
Q	3/5 stars
Robert Christgau	(1-star Honorable Mention)
Rolling Stone	2.5/5 stars
The Rolling Stone Album Guide	2/5 stars
Slant Magazine	2.5/5 stars

Ashanti earned generally mixed reviews from music critics. AllMusic editor Stephen Thomas Erlewine gave it a three-out-of-five-star rating and praised the "modern, post-hip-hop soul" sound, stating the album has "fairly fresh beats and lightly insistent hooks, and is just naughty enough". However, he felt it lacked distinctive material: "It's not bad by any means, and it has its moments, but at 17 tracks, including skits, it all becomes a blur. A pleasing blur, one that shows promise, but a blur all the same." Entertainment Weekly commended the album's "coy hooks" and "jagged-edged rappers", continuing to say "her voice is supple and pretty but rarely rises above a whisper, making it a background instrument even when it's Ashanti's turn to shine". The Los Angeles Times had a mixed view of the album, writing "Ashanti's breathy, cooing vocals are well suited to the mellow mood of this collection", however was unimpressed because it was not "substantial".

In another mixed review, Slant critic Sal Cinqueman found that, "the songs are infectious and fine-tuned and most of the album is underscored with bristling live instrumentation [...] But tracks like the flute-infused "Happy" are admittedly — and perhaps too obviously — influenced by other R&B divas like Mary J. Blige and rarely give way to anything fresh or new. Ultimately, Ashanti fails to carve a unique niche for the budding singer." Rolling Stone's Kris Ex complimented the album's overall production with its "bass-heavy, slow-burning R&B grooves that sound like everything else on R&B radio" and noted that Ashanti's "voice is the perfect radio-ready R&B; instrument: strong enough to ride over street-savvy beats but unassuming enough to be open to interpretation; better than Britney but less distinctive than Mary J. Blige." Alluding to her previous collaborations, People magazine wrote that "it’s one thing to sing a hook on someone else’s record, quite another to carry your own album, as Ashanti fails to do on this desultory debut [...] Ashanti, with her sweet but slight soprano, doesn’t have the grit and power of [other] divas. It doesn’t help that, despite sporadic sampling [...] lack memorable melodies."

== Legacy ==
Her debut album earned Ashanti three Grammy nominations for Best New Artist, Best Contemporary R&B Album and Best Female R&B Vocal Performance at the 45th Annual Grammy Awards. The same year, she also received two additional Grammy nominations for other projects, both in the category of Best Rap/Sung Collaboration. Ashanti took home a record 8 Billboard Music Awards, winning all the categories she was nominated for.

Billboard magazine ranked Ashanti at number 100 on magazine's Top 200 Albums of the Decade. In April 2002, Ashanti sold 503,000 copies in its first week of release in the United States, becoming a record-breaking feat. It was the highest first week sales for a female artist's debut ever. The album stayed atop the Billboard 200 for three consecutive weeks. In the same week, she became the first female performer to simultaneously hold the top two places on the Billboard Hot 100 singles chart with "Foolish" and "What's Luv" (with Fat Joe).

She broke records again by having three top ten songs ("Foolish", "What's Luv", and "Always on Time" (with Ja Rule)) on the Billboard Hot 100 charts in the same week. Only The Beatles have achieved this up to that point. In 2009, Billboard.com reported that Ashanti has had the most top 10 songs (16 to date) on the R&B/Hip-hop charts by a female for that respective decade. The album's lead single was named the 19th most successful song of the 2000s on the Billboard Hot 100 Songs of the Decade. As of June 2012, it is the third best selling physical single of the 21st century.

== Commercial performance ==
On April 20, 2002, Ashanti debuted at number one on the US Billboard 200 chart with first-week sales of 502,500 copies sold. In total, the album remained on the Billboard 200 albums chart for 55 consecutive weeks. In addition, it reached the top position on the Top R&B/Hip Hop Albums chart, where it stayed at the top spot for four consecutive weeks; it remained on the chart for 64 weeks. On December 17, 2002, the album was certified triple platinum by the Recording Industry Association of America (RIAA). As of June 2022, Ashanti has sold 3.7 million copies in the United States according to Nielsen SoundScan.

In Canada, it peaked at number 5 on the chart and was certified two times platinum for shipments of 200,000 copies. As of March 2005, the album had sold six million copies worldwide.

== Track listing ==
No.	Title	Writer(s)	Producer(s)	Length
1.	"Intro"	Jeffrey Atkins; 7 Aurelius; Taheem Crocker; Ashanti Douglas; Irving Lorenzo; Joseph Cartagena; Andre Parker; Christopher Rios; Takwon Green; Ramel Gill; Paul Walcott	7; Chink Santana; Irv Gotti	1:25
2.	"Foolish"	Douglas; 7 Aurelius; Lorenzo; Etterlene Jordan; Mark DeBarge	7; Irv Gotti	3:47
3.	"Happy"	Raymond Calhoun; Douglas; Parker; Lorenzo	Chink Santana; Irv Gotti	4:22
4.	"Leaving (Always on Time Part II)" (featuring Ja Rule)	Douglas; 7 Aurelius; Lorenzo; Atkins	7; Irv Gotti	3:55
5.	"Narrative Call (Skit)"			0:36
6.	"Call"	Douglas; 7 Aurelius; Lorenzo	7; Irv Gotti	5:05
7.	"Scared" (featuring Irv Gotti)	Douglas; Parker; Lorenzo	Chink Santana; Irv Gotti	4:43
8.	"Rescue"	Douglas; 7 Aurelius; Lorenzo	7; Irv Gotti	7:25
9.	"Baby"	Douglas; Parker; Lorenzo; 7 Aurelius; Mike Dean; Brad Jordan	Chink Santana; Irv Gotti; 7^{[a]}	4:25
10.	"Voodoo"	Douglas; 7 Aurelius; Lorenzo	7; Irv Gotti	4:42
11.	"Movies"	Douglas; 7 Aurelius; Lorenzo; Reggie Wiggins; Gerard Thomas	7; Irv Gotti; Wiggins^{[a]}; Thomas^{[a]}	4:09
12.	"Fight (Over Skit)"			1:18
13.	"Over"	Douglas; Parker; Lorenzo	Chink Santana; Irv Gotti	5:34
14.	"Unfoolish" (featuring the Notorious B.I.G.)	Douglas; 7 Aurelius; Lorenzo; Jordan; M. DeBarge; Sean Combs; Daron Jones; Robert Kelly; Christopher Wallace	7; Irv Gotti	3:14
15.	"Shi Shi (Skit)"			0:14
16.	"Dreams"	Douglas; 7 Aurelius; Lorenzo; El DeBarge	7; Irv Gotti	4:18
17.	"Thank You"	Douglas	Ashanti	1:47
Total length:				60:59

2023 digital deluxe edition bonus tracks
No.	Title	Length
18.	"Foolish" (Topnotch remix) (featuring DJ Olabean)	3:20
19.	"I'm So Happy" (remix) (featuring Charli Baltimore and Young Merc)	3:53
20.	"Happy" (remix) (featuring Ja Rule)	3:57
21.	"Baby" (remix) (featuring Crooked I)	4:52
22.	"Baby" (remix) (featuring Scarface)	4:47
23.	"Foolish" (instrumental)	3:51
24.	"Happy" (instrumental)	4:25
25.	"Baby" (instrumental)	4:28
26.	"Rescue" (instrumental)	7:28
27.	"Voodoo" (instrumental)	4:43
28.	"Unfoolish" (instrumental)	3:04
29.	"Foolish" (a capella)	3:21
30.	"Happy" (a capella) (featuring Ja Rule)	4:03
31.	"Voodoo" (a capella)	4:11
32.	"Unfoolish" (a capella)	3:15

=== Notes ===
- ^{^[a]} signifies a co-producer

=== Sample credits ===
- "Intro" contains elements of "Always on Time" (with Ja Rule), "What's Luv?" (with Fat Joe & Ja Rule), "Just Like a Thug" & "POV City Anthem" (both with Cadillac Tah), "The I.N.C." (with Ja Rule, Cadillac Tah and Black Child), "How We Roll" (with Big Pun) and "When a Man Does Wrong" which are all previous Ashanti songs and features.
- "Foolish" and "Unfoolish" contains a sample from "Stay with Me" by DeBarge.
- "Happy" contains an interpolation of "Outstanding" by the Gap Band.
- "Baby" contains an interpolation of "Mary Jane" by Scarface.
- "Unfoolish" contains samples from "F*** You Tonight" by the Notorious B.I.G.
- "Dreams" contains a portion of "Love Me in a Special Way" by DeBarge.

== Personnel ==
Credits adapted from the liner notes of Ashanti.

- Ashanti – lead vocals (1–4, 6–11, 13–14, 16–17), background vocals (1–4, 6–11, 13–14, 16,17)
- Irv Gotti – vocals (7, additional on 8), audio mixing (2–4, 6–11, 13–14, 16–17)
- Ja Rule – vocals (1, 4, additional on 3)
- Robert Bacon – guitar (4, 8, acoustic on 16), bass guitar (16)
- Courtnie Cox – additional vocals (16)
- Steven Cox – additional vocals (16)
- Kenneth Crouch – grand piano (16)
- Free – additional vocals (1)
- Kevin T. Green – additional vocals (16)
- Janae Huff – additional vocals (16)
- Darwin Johnson – bass (3)
- Trevor Lawrence Jr. – drums (16)
- Jasmine L. Morris – additional vocals (16)
- Chink Santana – live drums (13), instruments (7, 9, 13, additional on 3)
- 7 Aurelius – grand piano, electric guitar (16), instruments (6, 10–11, additional on 2, 4, 8, 14, 16), additional music programming (9), audio mixing (4, 6, 8, 10–11, 14, 16)
- Shia – vocals (15)
- Butch Small – percussion (14)
- Asif Ali – recording engineer (4, 17)
- Chris Dela Pena – assistant engineer (16), assistant mixing (4, 8, 10–11, 13–14, 17)
- Tony Duran – photography
- (Supa Engineer) Duro – audio mixing (2, 9)
- Brian "Big Bass" Gardener – mastering
- Deidre Graham – marketing
- Charles "Chee" Heath – assistant engineer (3, 7, 9, 13)
- Terry "Murda Mac" Herbert – assistant engineer (2, 6, 8, 10–11, 14)
- Jeremy Makenzie – assistant engineer (4, 17)
- Milwaukee Buck – recording engineer (2–3, 6–11, 13–14)
- Brian Springer – recording engineer (16), audio mixing (1, 3–4, 6–8, 10–11, 13–14, 16–17)
- David Tan – marketing
- Tony Vanias – recording coordinator

== Charts ==
=== Weekly charts ===
Weekly chart performance for Ashanti
Chart (2002)	Peak position
Australian Albums (ARIA)	10
Australian Urban Albums (ARIA)	2
Austrian Albums (Ö3 Austria)	36
Belgian Albums (Ultratop Flanders)	24
Belgian Albums (Ultratop Wallonia)	29
Canadian Albums (Billboard)	5
Canadian R&B Albums (Nielsen SoundScan)	1
Dutch Albums (Album Top 100)	12
European Top 100 Albums (Music & Media)	7
French Albums (SNEP)	29
German Albums (Offizielle Top 100)	10
Irish Albums (IRMA)	11
Japanese Albums (Oricon)	14
New Zealand Albums (RMNZ)	15
Scottish Albums (Official Charts)	26
Swiss Albums (Schweizer Hitparade)	15
UK Albums (Official Charts)	3
UK R&B Albums (Official Charts)	1
US Billboard 200	1
US Top R&B/Hip-Hop Albums (Billboard)	1

=== Year-end charts ===
2002 year-end chart performance for Ashanti
Chart (2002)	Position
Australian Albums (ARIA)	94
Australian Urban Albums (ARIA)	9
Belgian Albums (Ultratop Flanders)	90
Canadian Albums (Nielsen SoundScan)	31
Canadian R&B Albums (Nielsen SoundScan)	5
Dutch Albums (Album Top 100)	55
European Top 100 Albums (Music & Media)	60
German Albums (Offizielle Top 100)	74
Swiss Albums (Schweizer Hitparade)	61
UK Albums (OCC)	38
US Billboard 200	12
US Top R&B/Hip-Hop Albums (Billboard)	4
Worldwide Albums (IFPI)	17

2003 year-end chart performance for Ashanti
Chart (2003)	Position
US Billboard 200	160
US Top R&B/Hip-Hop Albums (Billboard)	91

=== Decade-end charts ===
Decade-end chart performance for Ashanti
Chart (2000–2009)	Position
US Billboard 200	101

== Certifications and sales ==
Certifications and sales for Ashanti
Region	Certification	Certified units/sales
Australia (ARIA)	Gold	35,000^{^}
Canada (Music Canada)	2× Platinum	200,000^{^}
Japan (RIAJ)	Platinum	200,000^{^}
New Zealand (RMNZ)	Platinum	15,000^{‡}
Switzerland (IFPI Switzerland)	Gold	20,000^{^}
United Kingdom (BPI)	Platinum	300,000^{^}
United States (RIAA)	3× Platinum	3,000,000^{^}
Summaries
Worldwide	—	6,000,000
^{^} Shipments figures based on certification alone.^{‡} Sales+streaming figures based on certification alone.

== Release history ==
Release dates and formats for Ashanti
Region	Date	Format	Label	Catalog No.	Ref.
United States	April 2, 2002	CD	Murder Inc.	5868302	
United States	April 2, 2002	Cassette	Murder Inc.	586830	
United States	April 2, 2002	LP	Murder Inc.	AA3145868301	
United Kingdom	April 8, 2002	CD	Mercury	586 830-2	
