= Loyalty (Fat Joe album) =

Studio album by Fat Joe
- Released: November 12, 2002
- Recorded: 2001–2002
- Studios: Sony Music Studios (New York, NY); TMF Studios (New York, NY); PatchWerk Recording Studios (Atlanta, GA); The Hit Factory Criteria (Miami, FL)
- Genre: Hip hop
- Length: 59:53
- Labels: Terror Squad; Atlantic
- Producers: Alchemist; Armageddon; Buckwild; Chink Santana; Cool & Dre; Irv Gotti; Precision; Ron Browz; Teflon; Ty Fyffe

Fat Joe chronology
Jealous Ones Still Envy (J.O.S.E.) (2001)	Loyalty (2002)	All or Nothing (2005)

Singles from Loyalty
- 1. "Crush Tonight" Released: October 1, 2002; 2. "All I Need" Released: December 17, 2002

Loyalty is the fifth studio album by American rapper Fat Joe. It was released on November 12, 2002, via Terror Squad/Atlantic Records. Recording sessions took place at Sony Music Studios and TMF Studios in New York, PatchWerk Recording Studios in Atlanta and The Hit Factory Criteria in Miami. Production was handled by Cool & Dre, Alchemist, Armageddon, Buckwild, Chink Santana, Irv Gotti, Larry "Precision" Gates, Ron Browz, Teflon and Ty Fyffe. It features guest appearances from fellow Terror Squad members Tony Sunshine, Remy Ma, Armageddon and Prospect, as well as Birdman, Ginuwine, Lamagic, Ronda Blackwell and Scarface.

The album debuted at number 31 on the US Billboard 200 and number 11 on the Top R&B/Hip-Hop Albums charts in the United States. It was supported with two singles: "Crush Tonight" and "All I Need". Its lead single, "Crush Tonight", peaked at number 77 on the Billboard Hot 100 and number 42 on the UK singles chart. The second single from the album, "All I Need", made it to number 86 on the Billboard Hot 100. The song "Take a Look At My Life" can be heard in the 2004 video game Def Jam: Fight for NY, which featured Fat Joe as a playable character.

== Critical reception ==
Professional ratings
Review scores
Source	Rating
AllMusic	3/5 stars
HipHopDX	2.5/5
laut.de	2/5 stars
RapReviews	7.5/10
The New Rolling Stone Album Guide	2/5 stars
The Source	4/5 stars
USA Today	3/4 stars

Mr. S of RapReviews gave praise to the production quality throughout the track listing, singling out Cool & Dre for their contributions that showcase their talents, and Joe for delivering on his lyrical content with hard-edged, introspective street bangers and romantic rap ballads despite getting a "little too commercial for his own good" in the middle portion of the album, concluding that "when all things are considered, Fat Joe did a nice job of balancing this album for different crowds and fanbases, if not a great job of doing so like he did on Don Cartagena and J.O.S.E.". Mike Oduro of HipHopDX wrote: "Fat Joe's Loyalty isn't anything more than average in the end. The hodge-podge of grimy, ghetto inspired tracks and commercially acceptable songs leave this album in staccato. Overall, as a product it's easy to recommend to the radio hungry hip hop fan, it's just that Fat Joe is not going to be remembered for the time he put into this release".

== Track listing ==
No.	Title	Writer(s)	Producer(s)	Length
1.	"Take a Look at My Life"	Joseph Cartagena; Anthony Best	Buckwild	4:00
2.	"Bust at You" (featuring Baby, Scarface and Tony Sunshine)	Cartagena; Bryan Williams; Brad Jordan; Alan Maman; George Clinton; William Collins; Gary Cooper	Alchemist	4:37
3.	"Prove Something"	Cartagena; Marcello Valenzano; Andre Lyon; Thomas David Richardson; Doug Edwards	Cool & Dre	3:55
4.	"TS Piece" (featuring Remy Ma and Tony Sunshine)	Cartagena; Reminisce Smith; Valenzano; Lyon	Cool & Dre	3:50
5.	"It's Nothing" (featuring Tony Sunshine)	Cartagena; Tyrone Fyffe; Valenzano; Lyon	Ty Fyffe	4:06
6.	"Turn Me On" (featuring Ronda Blackwell)	Cartagena; Irving Lorenzo; Andre Parker; Valenzano; Lyon	Irv Gotti; Chink Santana	3:41
7.	"Born in the Ghetto" (featuring Lamajic)	Cartagena; Valenzano; Lyon; Eddie Floyd	Cool & Dre	3:50
8.	"Crush Tonight" (featuring Ginuwine)	Cartagena; Elgin Lumpkin; Larry Gates; John Eaddy; Valenzano; Lyon	Precision	5:17
9.	"Gangsta"	Cartagena; Eaddy	Armageddon	3:54
10.	"All I Need" (featuring Tony Sunshine and Armageddon)	Cartagena; Eaddy; Valenzano; Lyon; James Harris III; Terry Lewis; Winfred Lovett	Cool & Dre	4:39
11.	"Life Goes On"	Cartagena; Valenzano; Lyon	Cool & Dre	4:53
12.	"Loyalty" (featuring Armageddon, Prospect and Remy Ma)	Cartagena; Eaddy; Richard Perez; Smith; Valenzano; Lyon; Michael Denne; Ken Gold	Cool & Dre	4:57
13.	"We Run This Shit"	Cartagena; Rondell Turner	Ron Browz	3:58
14.	"Shit Is Real Pt. III"	Cartagena; Sheldon Harris	Teflon	4:21
Total length:				59:53

== Personnel ==
- Joseph "Fat Joe" Cartagena — vocals, executive producer
- Bryan "Baby/Birdman" Williams — vocals (track 2)
- Brad "Scarface" Jordan — vocals (track 2)
- Antonio "Tony Sunshine" Cruz — vocals (tracks: 2, 4, 5, 10), additional vocals (track 8)
- Reminisce "Remy Martin" Smith — vocals (tracks: 4, 12)
- Ronda Blackwell — vocals (track 6)
- Floyd "Lamagic" Massey — vocals (track 7)
- Elgin "Ginuwine" Lumpkin — vocals (track 8)
- John "Armageddon" Eaddy — vocals (tracks: 10, 12), producer (track 9), executive producer
- Richard "Prospect" Perez — vocals (track 12)
- Charlie Rock — additional vocals (track 13)
- David Cabrera — guitar (track 4)
- Chris Feinstein — bass (tracks: 5, 14)
- Tom DeKorte — Wurlitzer electric piano (track 14), recording assistant (tracks: 2–5, 7–14)
- Anthony "Buckwild" Best — producer (track 1)
- Alan "The Alchemist" Maman — producer (track 2)
- Marcello "Cool" Valenzano — producer (tracks: 3, 4, 7, 10–12)
- Andre "Dre" Lyon — producer (tracks: 3, 4, 7, 10–12)
- Tyrone "Ty" Fyffe — producer (track 5)
- Irving "Irv Gotti" Lorenzo — producer (track 6)
- Andre "Chink Santana" Parker — producer (track 6)
- Larry "Precision" Gates — producer (track 8)
- Rondell "Ron Browz" Turner — producer (track 13)
- Sheldon "Teflon" Harris — producer (track 14)
- Christian "Soundboy" Delatour — recording
- Fabian Marasciullo — recording (track 6)
- Josh Butler — additional recording (track 2)
- Geoff Rice — recording assistant (tracks: 1, 2, 4, 6), mixing assistant (tracks: 3, 7)
- Toshikazu Yoshioka — recording assistant (tracks: 2–5, 7–14)
- Kent Hertz — recording assistant (track 6)
- Ken "Duro" Ifill — mixing (tracks: 1, 2, 5, 6, 13)
- Jason Goldstein — mixing (tracks: 3, 4, 7–12, 14)
- Nick Howard — mixing assistant (tracks: 1, 2, 5, 6, 13)
- Pablo Arraya — mixing assistant (tracks: 3, 4, 8–12, 14)
- Chris Gehringer — mastering
- Chris Athens — additional mastering
- Rob "Reef" Tewlow — co-executive producer, A&R
- Ola Kudu — art direction, design
- Christina Dittmar — art direction
- Kon Trubkovich — additional design
- Vincent Soyez — photography
- Anne DeClemente — A&R
- Craig Rosen — A&R
- Tara Balzano — A&R

== Charts ==
Chart (2002)	Peak position
UK R&B Albums (Official Charts)	28
US Billboard 200	31
US Top R&B/Hip-Hop Albums (Billboard)	11
