= List of Hot R&B/Hip-Hop Singles & Tracks number ones of 2002 =

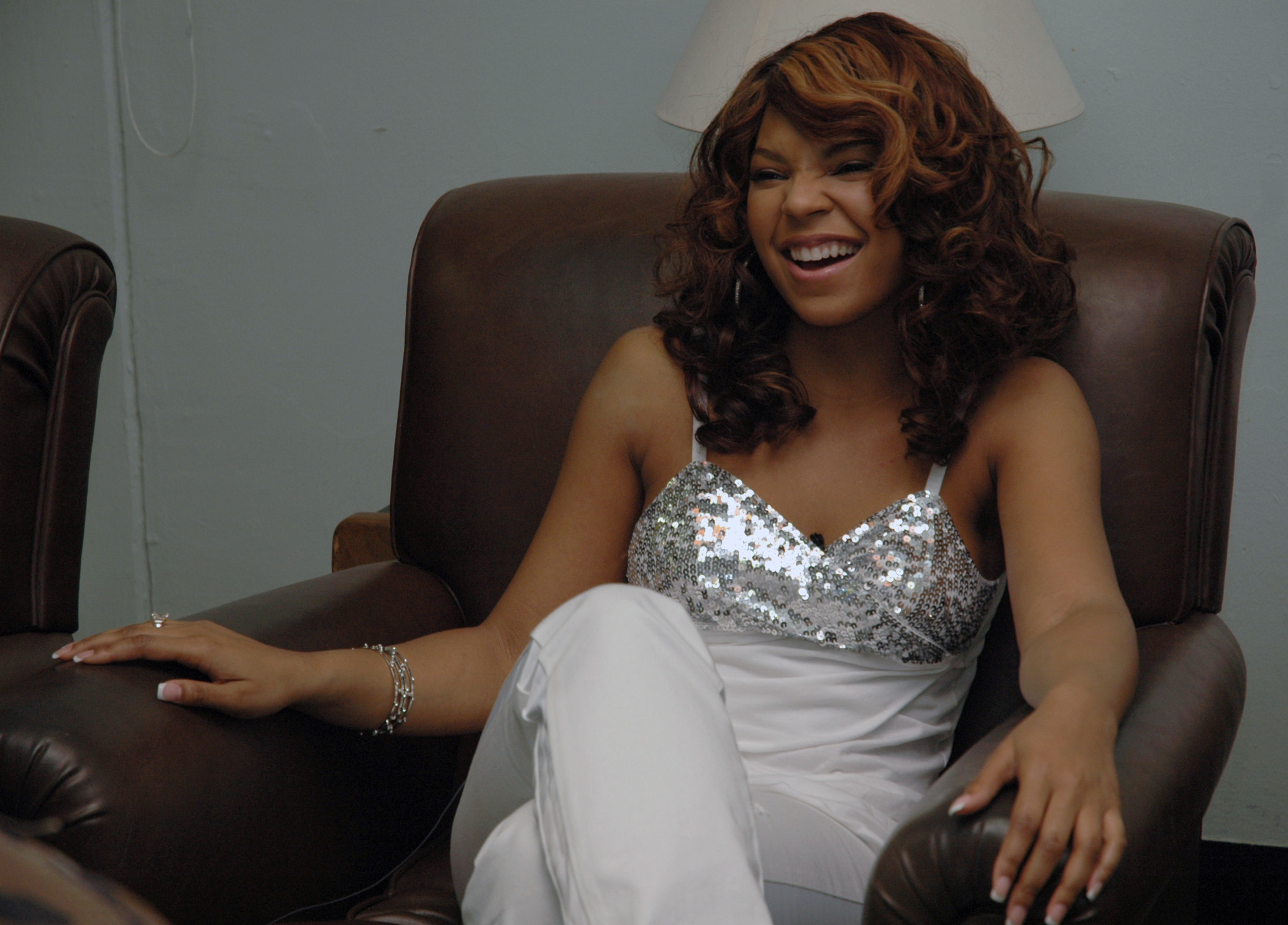
Ashanti had two long-running number ones in 2002.

These are the Billboard R&B singles chart number-one singles of 2002.

== Chart history ==
Key
†	Indicates best-charting R&B single of 2002

Issue date	Song	Artist
January 5	"Always on Time"	Ja Rule featuring Ashanti
January 12	"Always on Time"	Ja Rule featuring Ashanti
January 19	"Always on Time"	Ja Rule featuring Ashanti
January 26	"Always on Time"	Ja Rule featuring Ashanti
February 2	"Always on Time"	Ja Rule featuring Ashanti
February 9	"Always on Time"	Ja Rule featuring Ashanti
February 16	"Always on Time"	Ja Rule featuring Ashanti
February 23	"Always on Time"	Ja Rule featuring Ashanti
March 2	"Lights, Camera, Action!"	Mr. Cheeks
March 9	"Oops (Oh My)"	Tweet featuring Missy Elliott
March 16	"Oops (Oh My)"	Tweet featuring Missy Elliott
March 23	"Oops (Oh My)"	Tweet featuring Missy Elliott
March 30	"Foolish" †	Ashanti
April 6	"Foolish" †	Ashanti
April 13	"Foolish" †	Ashanti
April 20	"Foolish" †	Ashanti
April 27	"Foolish" †	Ashanti
May 4	"Foolish" †	Ashanti
May 11	"Foolish" †	Ashanti
May 18	"Foolish" †	Ashanti
May 25	"Foolish" †	Ashanti
June 1	"Foolish" †	Ashanti
June 8	"Oh Boy"	Cam'ron featuring Juelz Santana
June 15	"Oh Boy"	Cam'ron featuring Juelz Santana
June 22	"Oh Boy"	Cam'ron featuring Juelz Santana
June 29	"Oh Boy"	Cam'ron featuring Juelz Santana
July 6	"Oh Boy"	Cam'ron featuring Juelz Santana
July 13	"Hot in Herre"	Nelly
July 20	"Hot in Herre"	Nelly
July 27	"Hot in Herre"	Nelly
August 3	"Hot in Herre"	Nelly
August 10	"Hot in Herre"	Nelly
August 17	"Hot in Herre"	Nelly
August 24	"Dilemma"	Nelly featuring Kelly Rowland
August 31	"Dilemma"	Nelly featuring Kelly Rowland
September 7	"Dilemma"	Nelly featuring Kelly Rowland
September 14	"Dilemma"	Nelly featuring Kelly Rowland
September 21	"Dilemma"	Nelly featuring Kelly Rowland
September 28	"Dilemma"	Nelly featuring Kelly Rowland
October 5	"Dilemma"	Nelly featuring Kelly Rowland
October 12	"Dilemma"	Nelly featuring Kelly Rowland
October 19	"Dilemma"	Nelly featuring Kelly Rowland
October 26	"Luv U Better"	LL Cool J
November 2	"Luv U Better"	LL Cool J
November 9	"Luv U Better"	LL Cool J
November 16	"Luv U Better"	LL Cool J
November 23	"Work It"	Missy "Misdemeanor" Elliott
November 30	"Work It"	Missy "Misdemeanor" Elliott
December 7	"Work It"	Missy "Misdemeanor" Elliott
December 14	"Work It"	Missy "Misdemeanor" Elliott
December 21	"Work It"	Missy "Misdemeanor" Elliott
December 28	"Love of My Life (An Ode to Hip-Hop)"	Erykah Badu featuring Common

== See also ==
- 2002 in music
- List of number-one R&B hits (United States)
