= Crush Tonight =

Single by Fat Joe featuring Ginuwine

from the album Loyalty
- Released: August 27, 2002
- Recorded: 2002
- Genre: Hip hop
- Label: Terror Squad; Atlantic
- Songwriters: Joseph Cartagena; Elgin Lumpkin; Larry Gates; John Eaddy; Marcello Valenzano; Andre Lyon
- Producer: Larry "Precision" Gates

Fat Joe singles chronology
"What's Luv?" (2002)	"Crush Tonight" (2002)	"All I Need" (2003)

Ginuwine singles chronology
"Stingy" (2002)	"Crush Tonight" (2002)	"Hell Yeah" (2002)

"Crush Tonight" is a song performed by American rapper Fat Joe featuring American R&B singer Ginuwine. It was released on August 27, 2002 via Atlantic Records as the lead single from Fat Joe's fifth studio album Loyalty. Written by Fat Joe, Ginuwine, Larry "Precision" Gates, Armageddon, Cool & Dre, it was produced by Precision. An accompanying music video was directed by Benny Boom.

In the United States, the song peaked at number 77 on the Billboard Hot 100, number 29 on both the Hot R&B/Hip-Hop Songs and the R&B/Hip-Hop Airplay, and number 17 on the Hot Rap Songs charts. It also made it to number 42 on the UK singles chart and number 12 on the UK Official Hip Hop and R&B Singles Chart, as well as reaching number 92 in Germany.

DJ Khaled had made a cameo appearance in the music video.

== Track listing ==
US 12" 33 ⅓ RPM vinyl
No.	Title	Producer(s)	Length
1.	"Crush Tonight (Clean)" (featuring Ginuwine)	Precision
2.	"Crush Tonight (Dirty)" (featuring Ginuwine)	Precision
3.	"Crush Tonight" (Instrumental)	Precision
4.	"It's Nothing (Clean)" (featuring Tony Sunshine)	Ty Fyffe
5.	"It's Nothing (Dirty)" (featuring Tony Sunshine)	Ty Fyffe
6.	"It's Nothing" (Instrumental)	Ty Fyffe

EU 12" 33 ⅓ RPM vinyl
No.	Title	Length
1.	"Crush Tonight (Explicit Album Version)" (featuring Ginuwine)
2.	"Crush Tonight (Instrumental)" (featuring Ginuwine)
3.	"Crush Tonight (Blackout Remix)" (featuring Ginuwine)
4.	"Crush Tonight (Tia Maria Remix)" (featuring Ginuwine)

German 12" 33 ⅓ RPM vinyl
No.	Title	Length
1.	"Crush Tonight (Original Album Version)" (featuring Ginuwine)
2.	"Crush Tonight" (Blackout Remix)
3.	"Crush Tonight" (Tia Maria Remix)
4.	"Crush Tonight" (Original Instrumental)
5.	"Crush Tonight" (Blackout Remix Instrumental)
6.	"Crush Tonight" (Tia Maria Remix Instrumental)

EU enhanced CD maxi single
No.	Title	Length
1.	"Crush Tonight (Original Album Version)" (featuring Ginuwine)
2.	"Crush Tonight" (Blackout Remix)
3.	"Crush Tonight" (Tia Maria Remix)
4.	"Crush Tonight (MTV Clean Version) (Video)" (featuring Ginuwine)

== Charts ==
Chart (2002)	Peak position
Germany (GfK)	92
UK Singles (Official Charts)	42
UK Hip Hop/R&B (Official Charts)	12
US Billboard Hot 100	77
US Hot R&B/Hip-Hop Songs (Billboard)	29
US R&B/Hip-Hop Airplay (Billboard)	29
US Hot Rap Songs (Billboard)	17
