= List of Billboard Hot 100 number ones of 2002 =

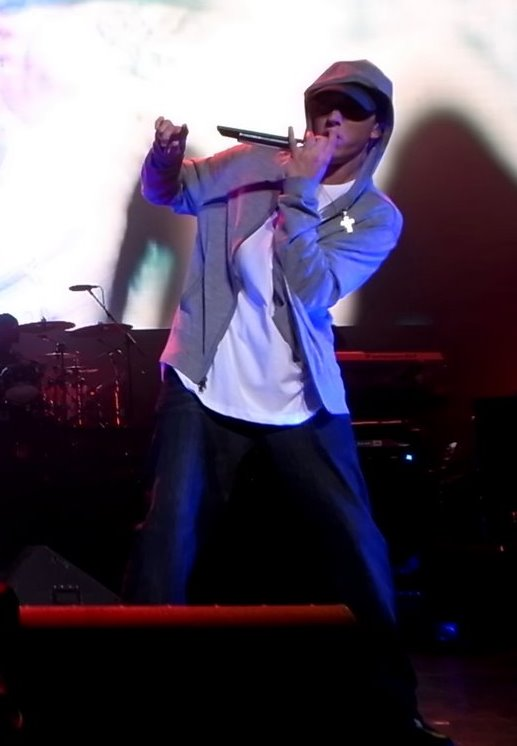
Rapper Eminem's "Lose Yourself" was the longest-running number-one single released in 2002.

The Billboard Hot 100 is a chart that ranks the best-performing singles of the United States. Published by Billboard magazine, the data are compiled by Nielsen SoundScan based collectively on each single's weekly physical sales and airplay. In 2002, there were seven singles that topped the chart, the lowest number of singles to top the chart in a single year ever (if the two songs which peaked in 2001 are included, 2002 would have the second lowest number of chart-topping singles in a year, behind 2005). Although nine singles reached number one in fifty-two issues of the magazine in the calendar year, two songs began their peak position in 2001 and are thus excluded.

In 2002, five acts earned their first U.S. number one single, either as a lead artist or featured guest. These artists were Ashanti, Nelly, Kelly Clarkson, and Eminem. Kelly Rowland, despite having hit number one with Destiny's Child, also earns her first number one song as a solo act. In 2002, Ja Rule, Ashanti, and Nelly had two number-one singles in the Billboard Hot 100.

Most of the number-one singles in 2002 were extended chart-toppers. "Lose Yourself" is the longest-running single, topping the Billboard Hot 100 for 12 consecutive weeks, eight of which were in this calendar year. "Foolish" and "Dilemma" both stayed at number one for 10 weeks, the latter of which was non-consecutive. "Ain't It Funny" by Jennifer Lopez, in its remix version with Ja Rule, peaked at number one for six weeks.

Rock band Nickelback's "How You Remind Me", which first peaked at number one in 2001, is the best-performing single of 2002. "Lose Yourself", which is the soundtrack to the 2002 film 8 Mile, is the second most-successful soundtrack song in the entire rock era. It is behind Whitney Houston's version of "I Will Always Love You", having topped the chart for 14 weeks. "Lose Yourself" is also the longest-running Oscar-winning number-one song since singer-actor Bing Crosby's "White Christmas" had 14 weeks on top in the 1940s. "A Moment Like This" is noted for its fifty-two-to-one leap in 2002, breaking the 38-year-old record set by The Beatles' "Can't Buy Me Love", which jumped from number twenty-seven to one.

Nelly became the first act to have consecutive number-one singles as the lead artist since 1994, when Boyz II Men had consecutive number-ones.

== Chart history ==
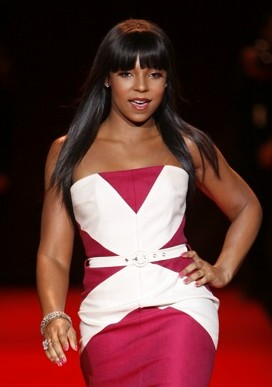
Singer Ashanti's debut single "Foolish" topped the chart for 10 straight weeks.

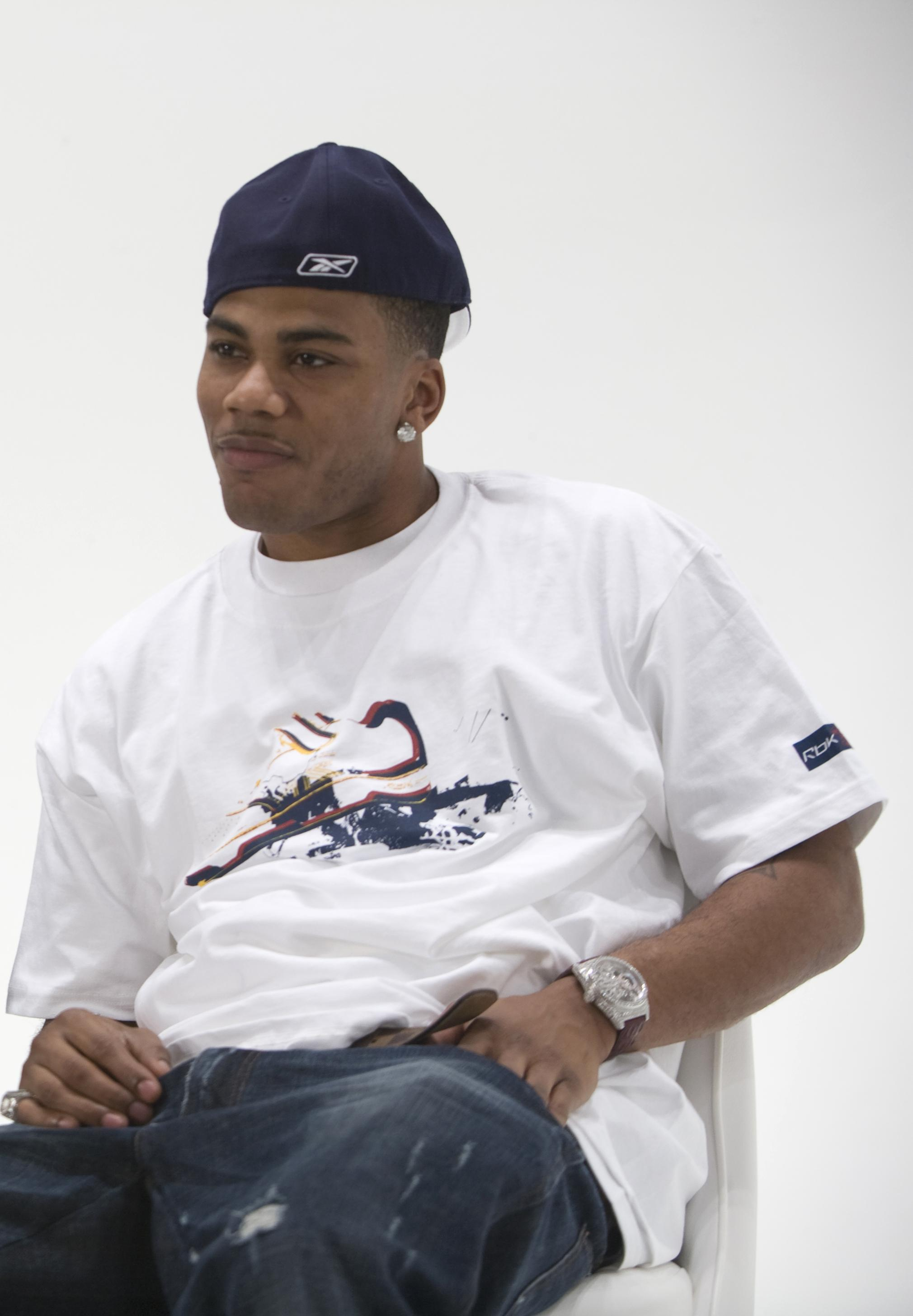
Rapper Nelly's "Dilemma" stayed at the top spot for 10 weeks, tying with Ashanti's "Foolish".

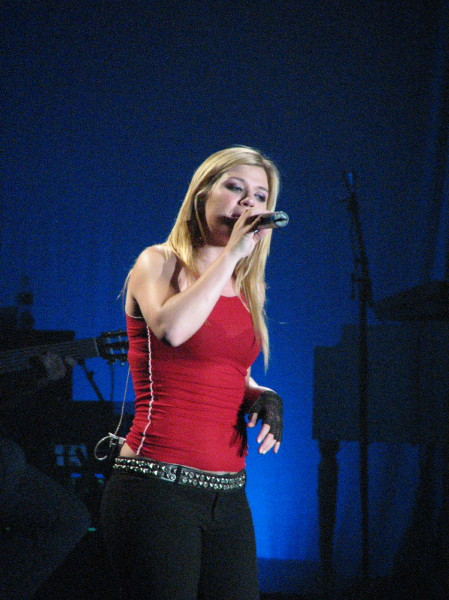
Singer Kelly Clarkson's debut single "A Moment Like This" is noted for its 52-to-one leap in 2002, breaking the 38-year-old record set by The Beatles' "Can't Buy Me Love", which jumped from number 27 to one.

Key
†	Indicates best-performing single of 2002

No.	Issue date	Song	Artist(s)	Ref.
881	January 5	"How You Remind Me" †	Nickelback	
881	January 12	"How You Remind Me" †	Nickelback	
re	January 19	"U Got It Bad"	Usher	
re	January 26	"U Got It Bad"	Usher	
re	February 2	"U Got It Bad"	Usher	
re	February 9	"U Got It Bad"	Usher	
re	February 16	"U Got It Bad"	Usher	
882	February 23	"Always on Time"	Ja Rule featuring Ashanti	
882	March 2	"Always on Time"	Ja Rule featuring Ashanti	
883	March 9	"Ain't It Funny (Murder Remix)"	Jennifer Lopez featuring Ja Rule	
883	March 16	"Ain't It Funny (Murder Remix)"	Jennifer Lopez featuring Ja Rule	
883	March 23	"Ain't It Funny (Murder Remix)"	Jennifer Lopez featuring Ja Rule	
883	March 30	"Ain't It Funny (Murder Remix)"	Jennifer Lopez featuring Ja Rule	
883	April 6	"Ain't It Funny (Murder Remix)"	Jennifer Lopez featuring Ja Rule	
883	April 13	"Ain't It Funny (Murder Remix)"	Jennifer Lopez featuring Ja Rule	
884	April 20	"Foolish"	Ashanti	
884	April 27	"Foolish"	Ashanti	
884	May 4	"Foolish"	Ashanti	
884	May 11	"Foolish"	Ashanti	
884	May 18	"Foolish"	Ashanti	
884	May 25	"Foolish"	Ashanti	
884	June 1	"Foolish"	Ashanti	
884	June 8	"Foolish"	Ashanti	
884	June 15	"Foolish"	Ashanti	
884	June 22	"Foolish"	Ashanti	
885	June 29	"Hot in Herre"	Nelly	
885	July 6	"Hot in Herre"	Nelly	
885	July 13	"Hot in Herre"	Nelly	
885	July 20	"Hot in Herre"	Nelly	
885	July 27	"Hot in Herre"	Nelly	
885	August 3	"Hot in Herre"	Nelly	
885	August 10	"Hot in Herre"	Nelly	
886	August 17	"Dilemma"	Nelly featuring Kelly Rowland	
886	August 24	"Dilemma"	Nelly featuring Kelly Rowland	
886	August 31	"Dilemma"	Nelly featuring Kelly Rowland	
886	September 7	"Dilemma"	Nelly featuring Kelly Rowland	
886	September 14	"Dilemma"	Nelly featuring Kelly Rowland	
886	September 21	"Dilemma"	Nelly featuring Kelly Rowland	
886	September 28	"Dilemma"	Nelly featuring Kelly Rowland	
887	October 5	"A Moment Like This"	Kelly Clarkson	
887	October 12	"A Moment Like This"	Kelly Clarkson	
re	October 19	"Dilemma"	Nelly featuring Kelly Rowland	
re	October 26	"Dilemma"	Nelly featuring Kelly Rowland	
re	November 2	"Dilemma"	Nelly featuring Kelly Rowland	
888	November 9	"Lose Yourself"	Eminem	
888	November 16	"Lose Yourself"	Eminem	
888	November 23	"Lose Yourself"	Eminem	
888	November 30	"Lose Yourself"	Eminem	
888	December 7	"Lose Yourself"	Eminem	
888	December 14	"Lose Yourself"	Eminem	
888	December 21	"Lose Yourself"	Eminem	
888	December 28	"Lose Yourself"	Eminem	

== Number-one artists ==
List of number-one artists by total weeks at number one
Position	Artist	Weeks at No. 1
1	Nelly	17
2	Ashanti	12
3	Kelly Rowland	10
4	Ja Rule	8
4	Eminem	8
6	Jennifer Lopez	6
7	Usher	5
8	Nickelback	2
8	Kelly Clarkson	2

== See also ==
- 2002 in music
- List of Billboard number-one singles
- Billboard Year-End Hot 100 singles of 2002
- List of Billboard Hot 100 number-one singles of the 2000s

== Additional sources ==
- Fred Bronson's Billboard Book of Number 1 Hits, 5th Edition (ISBN 0-8230-7677-6)
- Joel Whitburn's Top Pop Singles 1955-2008, 12 Edition (ISBN 0-89820-180-2)
- Joel Whitburn Presents the Billboard Hot 100 Charts: The 2000s (ISBN 0-89820-182-9)
- Additional information obtained can be verified within Billboard's online archive services and print editions of the magazine.
