= Jealous Ones Still Envy (J.O.S.E.) =

Studio album by Fat Joe
- Released: December 4, 2001
- Studios: TMF Studios (New York, NY); The Hit Factory Criteria (Miami, FL); The Crackhouse (New York, NY); Circle House Studios (Miami, FL); TransContinental Studios (Orlando, FL); Chung King Studios (New York, NY); Sound On Sound (New York, NY); The Studio (Philadelphia, PA); The Enterprise (California)
- Genre: Hip hop
- Length: 1:00:02
- Labels: Terror Squad; Atlantic
- Producers: Alchemist; Bink!; Buckwild; Chink Santana; Cool & Dre; DJ Nasty & LVM; Irv Gotti; Psycho Les; Rob "Reef" Tewlow; Rockwilder; Ron G; Sean Cane; Self; Younglord

Fat Joe chronology
The Album (1999)	Jealous Ones Still Envy (J.O.S.E.) (2001)	Loyalty (2002)

Singles from Jealous Ones Still Envy
- 1. "We Thuggin'" Released: October 2, 2001; 2. "What's Luv?" Released: February 4, 2002

Professional ratings
Review scores
Source	Rating
AllMusic	3.5/5 stars
HipHopDX	2/5
RapReviews	8/10
The Guardian	4/5 stars
The New Rolling Stone Album Guide	3/5 stars

Jealous Ones Still Envy (J.O.S.E.) is the fourth solo studio album by American rapper Fat Joe. Originally scheduled for a summer 2000 release, the album was released on December 4, 2001, via Atlantic Records and Fat Joe's Terror Squad Productions. Recording sessions took place at TMF Studios, The Crackhouse, Chung King Studios and Sound On Sound in New York, The Hit Factory Criteria and Circle House Studios in Miami, TransContinental Studios in Orlando, The Studio in Philadelphia, and The Enterprise in California. Production was handled by Buckwild, Irv Gotti, Ron G, Alchemist, Bink!, Chink Santana, Cool & Dre, DJ Nasty & LVM, Psycho Les, Reef, Rockwilder, Sean C, Self and Younglord. It features guest appearances from Remy Ma, Armageddon, Prospect, R. Kelly, Ashanti, Busta Rhymes, Buju Banton, Ja Rule, Ludacris, M.O.P., Noreaga, Petey Pablo and Xzibit.

The album serves as a sequel to Fat Joe's second album, Jealous One's Envy, released in 1995, and prequels his ninth solo LP, Jealous Ones Still Envy 2 (J.O.S.E. 2), which was released in 2009.

== Singles ==
The album was supported with two singles: "We Thuggin'" and "What's Luv?".

Its lead single, "We Thuggin'", released on October 2, 2001, prior to the album, made it to number 15 on the US Billboard Hot 100, number 37 in Australia, number 48 on the UK singles chart and number 70 in Germany.

The second single off of the album, "What's Luv?", released on February 4, 2002, peaked at number two on the US Billboard Hot 100 and in Switzerland, number four in Australia and the UK, number five in New Zealand, number seven in the Netherlands, number ten in Germany, and also made it to the Top 20 in Canada, Norway, Denmark, Scotland, Wallonia and Ireland. It achieved Gold certifications by the Australian Recording Industry Association and the Swedish Recording Industry Association and Platinum certification by the BPI. An accompanying music video for the song was directed by Bille Woodruff.

== Commercial performance ==
In the United States, the album debuted at number 37 on the Billboard 200 and number 6 on the Top R&B/Hip-Hop Albums charts on the week of December 22, 2001. It peaked at number 21 on the Billboard 200 on the week of April 20, 2002. It received a platinum certification by the Recording Industry Association of America on May 22, 2002, for shipping and selling over a million copies in the US alone.

The album marks Fat Joe's first entry into the UK Albums Chart and the Scottish Albums Chart, reaching number 19 and number 45, respectively. It also made it to the UK Hip Hop and R&B Albums Chart, peaking at number 5. The album was certified Silver by the British Phonographic Industry on May 17, 2002, for sales of 60,000 copies in the United Kingdom. To date, it is Fat Joe's best selling album.

== Track listing ==
No.	Title	Writer(s)	Producer(s)	Length
1.	"Intro"			0:27
2.	"J.O.S.E."	Joseph Cartagena; Lester Fernandez	Psycho Les	2:26
3.	"King of N.Y." (featuring Buju Banton)	Cartagena; Marcello Valenzano; Andre Lyon; Leonard Caston Jr.; Anita Poree	Cool & Dre	4:07
4.	"Opposites Attract (What They Like)" (featuring Remy Ma)	Cartagena; Reminisce Smith; Irving Lorenzo; Edward Hinson; Chester William Powers, Jr.	Irv Gotti; Self	4:03
5.	"Definition of a Don" (featuring Remy Ma)	Cartagena; Alan Maman	Alchemist	3:54
6.	"My Lifestyle"	Cartagena; Anthony Best	Buckwild	3:25
7.	"We Thuggin'" (featuring R. Kelly)	Cartagena; Robert Kelly; Ronald Bowser	Ron G	3:33
8.	"Fight Club" (featuring M.O.P. and Petey Pablo)	Cartagena; Jamal Grinnage; Eric Murray; Moses Barrett III; Rob Tewlow; Lamont Dozier; Brian Holland; Eddie Holland	Rob "Reef" Tewlow	5:17
9.	"What's Luv?" (featuring Ashanti and Ja Rule)	Cartagena; Jeffrey Atkins; Lorenzo; Andre Parker; Christopher Rios	Irv Gotti; Chink Santana	4:27
10.	"He's Not Real" (Intro)			0:22
11.	"He's Not Real" (featuring Prospect and Remy Ma)	Cartagena; Richard Perez; R. Smith; Richard Frierson	Younglord	3:43
12.	"The Fuck Up" (Interlude)			0:57
13.	"Get the Hell On with That" (featuring Ludacris and Armageddon)	Cartagena; Christopher Bridges; John Eaddy; Roosevelt Harrell	Bink!	4:03
14.	"It's O.K."	Cartagena; Sean Matthews; Louis Freese; Senen Reyes; Lawrence Muggerud; Lowell Fulson; James David Walker, Jr.	Sean Cane	3:20
15.	"Murder Rap" (featuring Armageddon)	Cartagena; Eaddy; Dana Stinson	Rockwilder	4:17
16.	"The Wild Life" (featuring Prospect and Xzibit)	Cartagena; Perez; Alvin Joiner; Johnny Mollings; Leonardo V. Mollings; Isaac Hayes	DJ Nasty & LVM	3:36
17.	"Still Real"	Cartagena; Best; Raeford Gerald; Reginald Spruill	Buckwild	4:10
18.	"We Thuggin' (Remix)" (featuring R. Kelly, Busta Rhymes, N.O.R.E. and Remy Ma)	Cartagena; Kelly; Trevor Smith; Victor Santiago; R. Smith; Bowser	Ron G	3:55
Total length:				1:00:02

Sample credits

- Track 3 contains excerpts from the composition "Just Memories", written by Leonard Caston Jr. and Anita Poree, performed by Eddie Kendricks.
- Track 4 contains excerpts from "Fresh Air", written by Jesse Farrow, performed by Quicksilver Messenger Service.
- Track 8 contains samples from the composition "Stop! In the Name of Love", written by Lamont Dozier, Brian Holland and Eddie Holland, as performed by Margie Joseph.
- Track 14 contains excerpts from "How I Could Just Kill a Man", written by Louis Freese, Senen Reyes, Lawrence Muggerud, Lowell Fulson and Jimmy McCracklin, performed by Cypress Hill.
- Track 16 contains interpolations from the composition "Ike's Rap I" written by Isaac Hayes.
- Track 17 contains excerpts from "You're the Joy of My Life", written by Raeford Gerald and Reginald Spruill, performed by Millie Jackson.

== Personnel ==
- Joseph "Fat Joe" Cartagena — vocals, executive producer
- Mark "Buju Banton" Myrie — vocals (track 3)
- Reminisce "Remy Martin" Smith — vocals (tracks: 4, 5, 11, 18)
- Robert Kelly — vocals (tracks: 7, 18)
- Jamal "Lil' Fame" Grinnage — vocals (track 8)
- Eric "Billy Danze" Murray — vocals (track 8)
- Moses "Petey Pablo" Barrett III — vocals (track 8)
- Ashanti Douglas — vocals (track 9)
- Jeffrey "Ja Rule" Atkins — vocals (track 9)
- Richard "Prospect" Perez — vocals (tracks: 11, 16)
- Christopher "Ludacris" Bridges — vocals (track 13)
- John "Armageddon" Eaddy — vocals (tracks: 13, 15), co-executive producer
- Alvin "Xzibit" Joiner — vocals (track 16)
- Trevor "Busta Rhymes" Smith — vocals (track 18)
- Victor "Noreaga" Santiago — vocals (track 18)
- Kid Ra-Ye — additional vocals (track 2)
- DJ Khaled — additional vocals (track 3)
- Ed Goldson — guitar & bass (tracks: 1, 14)
- Levar "DJ LV" Coppin — scratches (track 14), programming (track 1)
- Lenny "LVM" Mollings — keyboards & producer (track 16)
- Lester "Psycho Les" Fernandez — producer (track 2)
- Marcello "Cool" Valenzano — producer (track 3)
- Andre "Dre" Lyon — producer (track 3)
- Edward "Self" Hinson — producer (track 4)
- Irving "Irv Gotti" Lorenzo — producer & mixing (tracks: 4, 9)
- Daniel Alan "The Alchemist" Maman — producer (track 5)
- Anthony "Buckwild" Best — producer (tracks: 6, 17)
- Ronald "Ron G" Bowser — producer (tracks: 7, 18)
- Rob "Reef" Tewlow — producer (track 8), co-executive producer, A&R
- Andre "Chink Santana" Parker — producer (track 9)
- Richard "Younglord" Frierson — producer & mixing (track 11)
- Roosevelt "Bink!" Harrell III — producer (track 13)
- Deleno "Sean Cane" Matthews — producer (track 14), programming (track 1)
- Dana "Rockwilder" Stinson — producer (track 15)
- Johnny David "DJ Nasty" Mollings — producer (track 16)
- Christian "Soundboy" Delatour — recording (tracks: 1–8, 13–18), additional recording (track 11), recording assistant (track 9), mixing (track 1)
- James "Milwaukee Buck" Olowokere — recording (track 9)
- Christos Tsantilis — recording (track 11)
- Fabian Marasciullo — additional recording (track 3)
- Charles Hee — additional recording (track 4)
- Collin York — additional recording (track 4)
- Abel Garibaldi — additional recording (tracks: 7, 18)
- Ian Mereness — additional recording (tracks: 7, 18)
- Bart Migal — additional recording & mixing assistant (track 13)
- Jeff Chestek — additional recording (track 16)
- Asif Ali — additional recording (track 18)
- Gimel "Young Guru" Keaton — additional recording (track 18)
- Tom DeKorte — recording assistant (tracks: 1–9, 13–18), additional recording assistant (track 11), mixing assistant (track 1)
- Toshikazu Yoshioka — recording assistant (tracks: 1–9, 13–18), additional recording assistant (track 11), mixing assistant (track 1)
- Tavar Johnson — recording assistant (track 9), additional recording assistant (track 4)
- Terry "Murda Mac" Herbert — recording assistant (track 9)
- Vadim Chislov — additional recording assistant (track 3)
- Brian Kraz — additional recording assistant (track 4)
- Louis Diaz — additional recording assistant (track 4)
- Andy Gallas — additional recording assistant (tracks: 7, 18)
- Bojan Dugić — additional recording assistant (track 18)
- Ken "Duro" Ifill — mixing (tracks: 2, 3, 5–8, 11, 14–18)
- Carlisle Young — mixing (track 4)
- Brian Springer — mixing (track 9)
- Doug Wilson — mixing (track 13)
- Andrew Felluss — mixing assistant (tracks: 2, 5, 15)
- Paul Gregory — mixing assistant (tracks: 3, 7, 8, 11, 14, 16)
- Kris Lewis — mixing assistant (track 4)
- Rene Antelmann — mixing assistant (track 4)
- Timmy Olmstead — mixing assistant (tracks: 6, 17, 18)
- Aaron Lepley — mixing assistant (track 9)
- Blair Wells — additional engineering (track 14), digital editing
- Chris Gehringer — mastering
- Leon Zervos — additional mastering
- Thomas Bricker — art direction, design
- Piotr Sikora — photography
- Deborah Mannis-Gardner — sample clearances
- Anne Declemente — A&R
- Craig Rosen — A&R
- Gregg Nadel — A&R
- James Lopez — marketing
- Lorena Rios — stylist

== Charts ==
=== Weekly charts ===
Chart (2001–2002)	Peak position
Canadian Albums (Nielsen SoundScan)	39
Canadian R&B Albums (Nielsen SoundScan)	6
Dutch Albums (Album Top 100)	87
European Top 100 Albums (Music & Media)	65
French Albums (SNEP)	79
German Albums (Offizielle Top 100)	27
New Zealand Albums (RMNZ)	32
Scottish Albums (Official Charts)	45
Swiss Albums (Schweizer Hitparade)	43
UK Albums (Official Charts)	19
UK R&B Albums (Official Charts)	5
US Billboard 200	21
US Top R&B/Hip-Hop Albums (Billboard)	6

=== Year-end charts ===
Chart (2002)	Position
Canadian R&B Albums (Nielsen SoundScan)	39
Canadian Rap Albums (Nielsen SoundScan)	20
US Billboard 200	81
US Top R&B/Hip-Hop Albums (Billboard)	37

== Certifications ==
Region	Certification	Certified units/sales
United Kingdom (BPI)	Silver	60,000^{^}
United States (RIAA)	Platinum	1,000,000^{^}
^{^} Shipments figures based on certification alone.
