= We Thuggin' =

Single by Fat Joe featuring R. Kelly

from the album Jealous Ones Still Envy (J.O.S.E.)
- Released: October 2, 2001
- Recorded: 2000
- Genre: Hip hop
- Label: Terror Squad, Atlantic
- Songwriters: Ronald Bowser, Joseph Cartagena, R. Kelly
- Producers: Ron G, R. Kelly

Fat Joe singles chronology
"Feelin' So Good" (2000)	"We Thuggin'" (2001)	"What's Luv?" (2002)

R. Kelly singles chronology
"Feelin' on Yo Booty" (2001)	"We Thuggin'" (2001)	"The World's Greatest" (2001)

"We Thuggin'" is a single by American rapper Fat Joe featuring American singer R. Kelly. It is a single from Fat Joe's 2001 album Jealous Ones Still Envy (J.O.S.E.).

The official remix was also included in the album and features R. Kelly, Busta Rhymes, N.O.R.E. a.k.a. Noreaga and Remy Ma.

== Music video ==
The music video is directed by Bille Woodruff. It includes an appearance from DJ Khaled.

== Charts ==
=== Weekly charts ===
Chart (2001–2002)	Peak position
Australia (ARIA)	37
Germany (GfK)	70
UK Singles (Official Charts)	48
US Billboard Hot 100	15
US Hot R&B/Hip-Hop Songs (Billboard)	5
US Hot Rap Songs (Billboard)	7

=== Year-end charts ===
Chart (2002)	Position
US Billboard Hot 100	83
US Hot R&B/Hip-Hop Songs (Billboard)	39
