= Baby (Ashanti song) =

2002 single by Ashanti

Single by Ashanti

from the album Ashanti
- Released: September 9, 2002
- Studio: Crackhouse (New York City)
- Length: 4:31
- Label: Murder Inc.
- Songwriters: Ashanti Douglas; Andre Parker; Irving Lorenzo; 7 Aurelius; Mike Dean; Brad Jordan
- Producers: Chink Santana; Irv Gotti

Ashanti singles chronology
"Happy" (2002)	"Baby" (2002)	"Mesmerize" (2002)

Music video
- "Baby" on YouTube

"Baby" is the third single from American R&B singer Ashanti's self-titled debut album (2002). Written by Ashanti, Chink Santana, Irv Gotti, and 7 Aurelius, the song was released as the album's third and final single on September 9, 2002. "Baby" contains an interpolation of Scarface's "Mary Jane", which was also co-produced by 7 Aurelius, so Scarface and Mike Dean are credited as writers. A remix of the song features Scarface.

"Baby" reached number 15 on the US Billboard Hot 100 and number seven on the Billboard Hot R&B/Hip-Hop Singles & Tracks chart, becoming Ashanti's fifth top-10 entry on the latter chart. Internationally, the song charted at numbers 48 and 89 in the Netherlands and Germany, respectively.

== Music video ==
The music video features actress Nia Long. It is directed by CEO and founder of Murder Inc., Irv Gotti. A video was also made for a remix that features Crooked I.

== Track listings ==
US 12-inch single

A1. "Baby" (remix featuring Crooked I—clean)
A2. "Baby" (remix featuring Crooked I—clean without rap)
A3. "Baby" (remix featuring Crooked I—instrumental)
B1. "Baby" (remix featuring Scarface—clean)
B2. "Baby" (remix featuring Scarface—instrumental)

European CD1

1. "Baby" (radio edit)
2. "Baby" (remix with Scarface)

European CD2

1. "Baby" (radio edit)
2. "Baby" (album version)
3. "Baby" (remix with Scarface)
4. "Baby" (video)

== Credits and personnel ==
Credits are lifted from the European CD1 liner notes.

Studios

- Recorded at Crackhouse Studios (New York City)
- Mixed at Right Track Studios (New York City)

Personnel

- Ashanti – writing (as Ashanti Douglas), vocals
- Chink Santana – writing (as Andre Parker), all instruments, production
- Irv Gotti – writing (as Irving Lorenzo), production, mixing
- 7 Aurelius – writing, co-production, additional programming
- Mike Dean – "Mary Jane" writing
- Scarface – "Mary Jane" writing (as Brad Jordan)
- Milwaukee Buck – recording
- Charles "Chee" Heath – recording assistant
- Supa Engineer DURO – mixing

== Charts ==
=== Weekly charts ===
Chart (2002)	Peak position
Germany (GfK)	89
Netherlands (Dutch Top 40 Tipparade)	6
Netherlands (Single Top 100)	48
US Billboard Hot 100	15
US Hot R&B/Hip-Hop Songs (Billboard)	7
US Rhythmic Airplay (Billboard)	7

=== Year-end charts ===
Chart (2002)	Position
US Billboard Hot 100	81
US Hot R&B/Hip-Hop Singles & Tracks (Billboard)	32
US Rhythmic Top 40 (Billboard)	68
