= Happy (Ashanti song) =

2002 single by Ashanti

Single by Ashanti

from the album Ashanti
- B-side: "I'm So Happy"; "Call"
- Released: June 17, 2002
- Studio: Crackhouse (New York City)
- Length: 4:22
- Label: Murder Inc.
- Songwriters: Raymond Calhoun; Ashanti Douglas; Andre Parker; Irv Lorenzo
- Producers: Irv Gotti; Chink Santana

Ashanti singles chronology
"Down 4 U" (2002)	"Happy" (2002)	"Baby" (2002)

Music video
- "Happy" on YouTube

"Happy" is a song by American singer Ashanti from her self-titled debut album (2002). The track was written by Ashanti, Chink Santana, and Irv Gotti, with production overseen by Santana and Gotti, and contains a sample of Gap Band's "Outstanding" (1982), written by Raymond Calhoun. "Happy" was released as the album's second single on June 17, 2002, reaching number eight on the US Billboard Hot 100 and number six on the Billboard Hot R&B/Hip-Hop Singles & Tracks chart. Elsewhere, the single entered the top 10 in the Netherlands and reached the top 20 in Ireland, New Zealand, and the United Kingdom.

== Remix ==
The remix of "Happy", titled "I'm So Happy", was produced by Santana and features rapper Charli Baltimore and further integrates a sample of "Outstanding". This version was later included on the Murder Inc. remix-compilation Irv Gotti Presents: The Remixes.

== Track listings ==
UK CD single

1. "Happy" (radio edit featuring Ja Rule) – 3:59
2. "I'm So Happy" (remix featuring Charli Baltimore) – 3:58
3. "Happy" (explicit remix featuring Ja Rule) – 3:59
4. "Happy" (DnD vocal mix featuring Ja Rule) – 4:51
5. "Happy" (video featuring Ja Rule) – 4:00

UK cassette single

1. "Happy" (radio edit featuring Ja Rule) – 3:59
2. "I'm So Happy" (remix featuring Charli Baltimore) – 3:58

European CD single

1. "Happy" (album version)
2. "Call" (album version)

Australian CD single

1. "Happy" (album version)
2. "Call" (album version)
3. "I'm So Happy" (remix featuring Charli Baltimore)
4. "Happy" (video)

== Credits and personnel ==
Credits are adapted from the UK CD single liner notes.

Studios

- Recorded at Crackhouse Studios (New York City)
- Mixed at Sound Castle Studios (Los Angeles)
- Mastered at Sony Music Studios (London, England)

Personnel

- Raymond Calhoun – writing ("Outstanding")
- Ashanti Douglas – writing, vocals
- Chink Santana – writing (as Andre Parker), all instruments, production
- Irv Gotti – writing (as Irv Lorenzo), production, mixing, video director
- Ja Rule – featured vocals
- Darwin Johnson – bass guitar
- Milwaukee Buck – recording
- Charles "Chee" Heath – assistant recording engineer
- Brian Springer – mixing
- Naweed "Dirty" Ahmed – mastering

== Charts ==
=== Weekly charts ===
Chart (2002)	Peak position
Australia (ARIA)	29
Australian Urban (ARIA)	8
Belgium (Ultratop 50 Flanders)	49
Belgium (Ultratop 50 Wallonia)	35
Europe (European Hot 100 Singles)	45
France (SNEP)	40
Germany (GfK)	41
Ireland (IRMA)	22
Netherlands (Dutch Top 40)	10
Netherlands (Single Top 100)	10
New Zealand (Recorded Music NZ)	19
Scotland Singles (OCC)	24
Switzerland (Schweizer Hitparade)	24
UK Singles (OCC)	13
UK Hip Hop/R&B (OCC)	5
US Billboard Hot 100	8
US Hot R&B/Hip-Hop Songs (Billboard)	6
US Pop Airplay (Billboard)	12
US Rhythmic Airplay (Billboard)	4

=== Year-end charts ===
Chart (2002)	Position
Netherlands (Dutch Top 40)	80
Netherlands (Single Top 100)	93
US Billboard Hot 100	41
US Hot R&B/Hip-Hop Singles & Tracks (Billboard)	40
US Mainstream Top 40 (Billboard)	68
US Rhythmic Top 40 (Billboard)	25

== Certifications ==
Region	Certification	Certified units/sales
New Zealand (RMNZ)	Gold	15,000^{‡}
United Kingdom (BPI)	Silver	200,000^{‡}
^{‡} Sales+streaming figures based on certification alone.

== Release history ==
Region	Date	Format(s)	Label(s)	Ref.
United States	June 17, 2002	Rhythmic contemporary; urban radio	Murder Inc.	
Australia	September 30, 2002	CD	Murder Inc.	
United Kingdom	November 11, 2002	CD; cassette	Murder Inc.	
