= Foolish (Ashanti song) =

2002 single by Ashanti

Single by Ashanti

from the album Ashanti
- Released: February 11, 2002
- Studio: Crackhouse (New York City)
- Genre: R&B
- Length: 3:47
- Label: Def Jam; AJM; Murder Inc.
- Songwriters: Ashanti Douglas; 7 Aurelius; Irving Lorenzo; Mark DeBarge; Etterlene Jordan
- Producer: Irv Gotti

Ashanti singles chronology
"What's Luv?" (2002)	"Foolish" (2002)	"Down 4 U" (2002)

Audio sample
- "Foolish": file; help

Music video
- "Foolish" on YouTube

"Foolish" is a song by American singer-songwriter Ashanti. It was released as the lead single from her self-titled debut album (2002) on February 11, 2002, serving as Ashanti's debut solo single. "Foolish" was written by Ashanti, 7 Aurelius, and Irv Gotti, while production was overseen by Gotti. The song heavily samples DeBarge's "Stay with Me", so Mark DeBarge and Etterlene Jordan are also credited as songwriters. A promotional version of the single called "Unfoolish" features a verse from The Notorious B.I.G. from his song "Fucking You Tonight".

"Foolish" spent 10 consecutive weeks at number one on both the US Billboard Hot 100 and Hot R&B/Hip-Hop Singles & Tracks charts, becoming Ashanti's second number one and third top-10 entry on both charts. It is Ashanti's highest-charting single as a lead artist. Elsewhere, "Foolish" became a top-10 hit in the Australia, Canada, New Zealand, and the United Kingdom. The song was nominated for Best Female R&B Vocal Performance at the 2003 Grammy Awards, and won the Soul Train Music Award for Best R&B/Soul Single – Female. In 2009, Billboard ranked it 19th on its Hot 100 Songs of the 2000s Decade.

== Composition ==
The song is performed in the key of C major in common time with a tempo of 89 beats per minute. It follows a chord progression of Fmaj7–G, and Ashanti's vocals span from A_{3} to C_{6}.

== Commercial performance ==
"Foolish" spent 10 consecutive weeks at number one on the Billboard charts and a total of 17 weeks in the top 10. It would later get ranked the second best performing single of 2002, and listed as the 132nd best single.

== Music video ==
The filming session of the video for the single took place during January 2002. It was directed by Irv Gotti. The video shows the viewer a relationship where a man, played by Terrence Howard, gets involved into some criminal acts after telling his girlfriend [Ashanti] that he is in construction and is unfaithful to Ashanti with Love & Hip Hop: Atlanta reality star Althea, which ends up in a break-up after some quarrel. As the song suggests, Ashanti feels that she still loves her ex and that she just can't seem to get over him and becomes frustrated since her heart and her mind force her to love him and hate him at the same time. The video is set in the fashion of the movie Goodfellas, with Ashanti in the role of Karen Hill and Terrence Howard in the role of Henry Hill. Irv Gotti and Ja Rule are also in a scene appearing to take the roles of Jimmy Conway and Paulie Cicero. Additionally, Murder Inc. affiliate Ron Robinson and artists Vita, Charli Baltimore, O-1 and Jodie Mack cameo appearances. The video was a three-time nominee at the 2002 MTV Video Music Awards for Best Female Video, Best R&B Video, and Best New Artist.

== Track listings ==
European CD single

1. "Foolish" (radio edit) – 3:52
2. "Foolish" (instrumental) – 3:52

Australian and US maxi single

1. "Foolish" (radio edit) – 3:52
2. "Foolish" (album version) – 3:48
3. "Foolish" (instrumental) – 3:51
4. "Foolish" (video)

UK CD single

1. "Foolish" (album version) – 3:48
2. "Unfoolish" (clean album version) – 3:15
3. "Foolish" (Topnotch Remix)
4. "Foolish" (video)

== Credits and personnel ==
Credits are adapted from the liner notes of Ashanti.

- Instrumentation – 7 Aurelius
- Mixing – Supa Engineer Duro, Irv Gotti
- Production – 7 Aurelius, Irv Gotti
- Songwriting – 7 Aurelius, A. Douglas, E. Jordan, I. Lorenzo, M. DeBarge
- Recording – Milwaukee Buck
- Recording assistance – Terry "Murda Mac" Herbert

== Charts ==
=== Weekly charts ===
Weekly chart performance for "Foolish"
Chart (2002)	Peak position
Australia (ARIA)	6
Australian Urban (ARIA)	3
Austria (Ö3 Austria Top 40)	49
Belgium (Ultratop 50 Flanders)	49
Belgium (Ultratop 50 Wallonia)	37
Canada CHR (Nielsen BDS)	1
Europe (Eurochart Hot 100)	16
France (SNEP)	62
Germany (GfK)	26
Ireland (IRMA)	14
Netherlands (Dutch Top 40)	8
Netherlands (Single Top 100)	12
New Zealand (Recorded Music NZ)	8
Scottish Singles Sales (Official Charts)	11
Sweden (Sverigetopplistan)	52
Switzerland (Schweizer Hitparade)	15
UK Singles (Official Charts)	4
UK Hip Hop/R&B (Official Charts)	1
US Billboard Hot 100	1
US Hot R&B/Hip-Hop Songs (Billboard)	1
US Pop Airplay (Billboard)	2
US Rhythmic Airplay (Billboard)	1

=== Year-end charts ===
Year-end chart performance for "Foolish"
Chart (2002)	Position
Australia (ARIA)	32
Australian Urban (ARIA)	4
Canada Radio (Nielsen BDS)	49
Ireland (IRMA)	91
Netherlands (Dutch Top 40)	53
Netherlands (Single Top 100)	65
Switzerland (Schweizer Hitparade)	82
UK Singles (OCC)	72
UK Airplay (Music Week)	23
UK Urban (Music Week)	1
US Billboard Hot 100	2
US Hot R&B/Hip-Hop Singles & Tracks (Billboard)	1
US Mainstream Top 40 (Billboard)	18
US Rhythmic Top 40 (Billboard)	1

=== Decade-end charts ===
Decade-end chart performance for "Foolish"
Chart (2000–2009)	Position
US Billboard Hot 100	19

=== All-time charts ===
All-time chart performance for "Foolish"
Chart (1958–2018)	Position
US Billboard Hot 100	132

== Certifications ==
Certifications for "Foolish"
Region	Certification	Certified units/sales
Australia (ARIA)	Platinum	70,000^{^}
New Zealand (RMNZ)	2× Platinum	60,000^{‡}
New Zealand (RMNZ) "Unfoolish"	Platinum	30,000^{‡}
United Kingdom (BPI)	Platinum	454,000
United Kingdom (BPI) "Unfoolish"	Silver	200,000^{‡}
United States (RIAA)	2× Platinum	2,000,000^{‡}
^{^} Shipments figures based on certification alone.^{‡} Sales+streaming figures based on certification alone.

== Release history ==
Release dates and formats for "Foolish"
Region	Date	Format(s)	Label(s)	Ref.
United States	February 11, 2002	Rhythmic contemporary; urban radio	Murder Inc.; Def Jam	
United States	April 8, 2002	Contemporary hit radio	Murder Inc.; Def Jam	
Australia	May 20, 2002	CD	Murder Inc.; Def Jam	
United Kingdom	July 8, 2002	12-inch vinyl; CD; cassette	Murder Inc.; Def Jam	

== See also ==
- List of Hot 100 number-one singles of 2002 (U.S.)
- List of number-one R&B singles of 2002 (U.S.)
- List of best-selling singles
