= Hot in Herre =

2002 single by Nelly

Single by Nelly

from the album Nellyville
- B-side: "Not in My House"; "Kings Highway"
- Released: May 7, 2002
- Genre: Hip-hop
- Length: 3:49
- Label: Universal; Fo' Reel
- Songwriters: Cornell Haynes; Pharrell Williams; Chad Hugo; Charles Brown
- Producer: The Neptunes

Nelly singles chronology
"Girlfriend" (remix) (2002)	"Hot in Herre" (2002)	"Dilemma" (2002)

Music videos
- "Hot in Herre" on YouTube; "Hot in Herre" (St. Louis Arch version) on YouTube

"Hot in Herre" is a song by American rapper Nelly, released as the lead single from his second album, Nellyville (2002). It was released on May 7, 2002, by Universal Records. The song was written by Nelly, Chuck Brown, and the production duo the Neptunes, and incorporates elements of Brown's 1979 single "Bustin' Loose", Neil Young's 1972 song "There's a World", and Nancy Sinatra's 1966 cover of the Rolling Stones' "As Tears Go By". It features additional vocals by Dani Stevenson.

"Hot in Herre" is widely considered one of Nelly's signature songs, alongside follow-up single "Dilemma". The two singles became back-to-back number-one hits on the Billboard Hot 100 in 2002. The song also reached number one in Canada and entered the top 10 in 12 additional countries.

== Commercial performance ==
"Hot in Herre" premiered on April 15, 2002, several weeks before its official release, through AOL Music's First Listen online streaming service. It received more than 760,000 streams, setting a record for the website.

The song peaked at number one in Canada, reached number four in the United Kingdom, and charted within the top 10 in several other international markets. In the United States, it became Nelly's first number-one hit on the Billboard Hot 100 and the Neptunes' first number-one hit as producers. It entered the Hot 100 on May 4, 2002, reached number one on June 29, and remained there until it was replaced by Nelly's follow-up single "Dilemma" on August 10. "Hot in Herre" ultimately finished at number three on the 2002 Billboard Year-End Hot 100 singles chart.

== Awards and accolades ==
At the 45th Annual Grammy Awards in 2003, the song won the inaugural Grammy Award for Best Male Rap Solo Performance In 2008, the song was ranked number 36 on VH1's "100 Greatest Songs of Hip Hop". In 2014, San Francisco radio station Hot 105.7 played the song on a continuous loop to promote its change from Latin music to rhythmic contemporary. The stunt lasted 72 hours and attracted media attention.

== Music video ==
Two music videos were produced for song. The original, known as the "St. Louis Arch Version" and serviced to MTV Europe, depicts a nightclub inside the Gateway Arch in St. Louis and features cameo appearances by Cedric the Entertainer, Carmelo Anthony, T. J. Duckett, and Julius Peppers. A second version, released in North America, is similarly set in a nightclub and features Cedric the Entertainer as a DJ who briefly interrupts the song to announce a “fire” on the dance floor, though the crowd continues singing along.

== Track listings ==
US CD single

1. "Hot in Herre" (radio edit) – 3:50
2. "Hot in Herre" (clean album version) – 3:50

US 12-inch single

A1. "Hot in Herre" (clean—with drops) – 3:50
A2. "Hot in Herre" (clean—no drops) – 3:50
B1. "Hot in Herre" (album version) – 3:50
B2. "Hot in Herre" (instrumental) – 3:50

Canadian and European CD single

1. "Hot in Herre" (radio edit) – 3:50
2. "Hot in Herre" (X-Ecutioners remix) – 3:58

UK CD and cassette single

1. "Hot in Herre" (radio edit) – 3:50
2. "Hot in Herre" (X-Ecutioners remix) – 3:58
3. "Not in My House" – 2:58

UK 12-inch single

A1. "Hot in Herre" (X-Ecutioners remix) – 3:58
A2. "Hot in Herre" (radio edit) – 3:50
B1. "Hot in Herre" (Third Eye remix) – 4:57

Australasian CD single 1

1. "Hot in Herre" (radio edit) – 3:50
2. "Hot in Herre" (Third Eye remix) – 4:57
3. "Hot in Herre" (Maximum Risk remix) – 3:51
4. "Kings Highway" – 5:31

Australasian CD single 2

1. "Hot in Herre" (radio edit) – 3:50
2. "Hot in Herre" (X-Ecutioners remix) – 3:58
3. "Not in My House" – 2:58
4. "Hot in Herre" (Corporate remix) – 3:36

== Charts ==
=== Weekly charts ===
2002 weekly chart performance for "Hot in Herre"
Chart (2002)	Peak position
Australia (ARIA)	3
Australian Urban (ARIA)	1
Austria (Ö3 Austria Top 40)	16
Belgium (Ultratop 50 Flanders)	7
Belgium (Ultratop 50 Wallonia)	13
Canada (Nielsen SoundScan)	1
Croatia (HRT)	10
Denmark (Tracklisten)	2
Europe (Eurochart Hot 100)	8
France (SNEP)	23
Germany (GfK)	8
Ireland (IRMA)	10
Italy (FIMI)	37
Netherlands (Dutch Top 40)	4
Netherlands (Single Top 100)	4
New Zealand (Recorded Music NZ)	3
Norway (VG-lista)	5
Scottish Singles Sales (Official Charts)	11
Sweden (Sverigetopplistan)	6
Switzerland (Schweizer Hitparade)	10
UK Singles (Official Charts)	4
UK Hip Hop/R&B (Official Charts)	1
US Billboard Hot 100	1
US Hot R&B/Hip-Hop Songs (Billboard)	1
US Hot Rap Songs (Billboard)	1
US Pop Airplay (Billboard)	1
US Rhythmic Airplay (Billboard)	1

2022 weekly chart performance for "Hot in Herre"
Chart (2022)	Peak position
Canada Digital Song Sales (Billboard)	29

=== Year-end charts ===
Year-end chart performance for "Hot in Herre"
Chart (2002)	Position
Australia (ARIA)	17
Australian Urban (ARIA)	3
Belgium (Ultratop 50 Flanders)	30
Belgium (Ultratop 50 Wallonia)	64
Canada (Nielsen SoundScan)	5
Europe (Eurochart Hot 100)	38
Germany (Media Control)	39
Ireland (IRMA)	36
Netherlands (Dutch Top 40)	14
Netherlands (Single Top 100)	20
New Zealand (RIANZ)	22
Sweden (Hitlistan)	35
Switzerland (Schweizer Hitparade)	48
UK Singles (OCC)	27
UK Airplay (Music Week)	26
UK Urban (Music Week)	10
US Billboard Hot 100	3
US Hot R&B/Hip-Hop Singles & Tracks (Billboard)	4
US Hot Rap Tracks (Billboard)	1
US Mainstream Top 40 (Billboard)	10
US Rhythmic Top 40 (Billboard)	3

=== Decade-end charts ===
Decade-end chart performance for "Hot in Herre"
Chart (2000–2009)	Position
US Billboard Hot 100	32

=== All-time charts ===
All-time chart performance for "Hot in Herre"
Chart (1958–2018)	Position
US Billboard Hot 100	184

== Certifications ==
Certifications and sales for "Hot in Herre"
Region	Certification	Certified units/sales
Australia (ARIA)	Platinum	70,000^{^}
Denmark (IFPI Danmark)	Gold	45,000^{‡}
Germany (BVMI)	Gold	250,000^{‡}
New Zealand (RMNZ)	3× Platinum	90,000^{‡}
United Kingdom (BPI) physical	Silver	200,000^{^}
United Kingdom (BPI) digital	2× Platinum	1,200,000^{‡}
United States (RIAA)	2× Platinum	2,000,000^{‡}
^{^} Shipments figures based on certification alone.^{‡} Sales+streaming figures based on certification alone.

== Release history ==
Release dates and formats for "Hot in Herre"
Region	Date	Format(s)	Label(s)	Ref.
United States	May 7, 2002	Rhythmic contemporary; urban radio	Universal; Fo' Reel	
United States	May 20, 2002	Contemporary hit radio	Universal; Fo' Reel	
Australia	June 10, 2002	CD single	Universal; Fo' Reel	
United Kingdom	June 17, 2002	12-inch single; CD single; cassette single	Universal; Fo' Reel	
