= What's Luv? =

2002 single by Fat Joe

Single by Fat Joe featuring Ashanti

from the album Jealous Ones Still Envy (J.O.S.E.)
- B-side: "Definition of a Don"; "Hustlin'"
- Released: February 4, 2002
- Studio: The Crackhouse (New York City)
- Length: 4:27 (album version); 3:51 (radio version)
- Label: Atlantic; Terror Squad
- Songwriters: Joseph Cartagena; Jeffrey Atkins; Andre Parker; Irving Lorenzo; Christopher Rios; Terry Britten; Graham Lyle
- Producers: Chink Santana; Irv Gotti

Fat Joe singles chronology
| "We Thuggin'" (2001) | "What's Luv?" (2002) | "Crush Tonight" (2002) |

Ashanti singles chronology
| "Always on Time" (2001) | "What's Luv?" (2002) | "Foolish" (2002) |

Ja Rule singles chronology
| "Ain't It Funny (Murder Remix)" (2002) | "What's Luv?" (2002) | "Rainy Dayz" (2002) |

Music video
- "What's Luv?" on YouTube

"What's Luv?" is a song by American rapper Fat Joe, released through Atlantic Records and Fat Joe's Terror Squad Productions as the second single from his fourth studio album, Jealous Ones Still Envy (J.O.S.E.) (2001). The song features additional vocals from singer Ashanti and from rapper Ja Rule on the remix and album version of the song. "What's Luv?" was produced by Irv Gotti and Chink Santana. The lyrics of the song's chorus are based in part on the title refrain of the 1984 Tina Turner hit "What's Love Got to Do with It". The song additionally includes a lyric ("I'm not a hater, I just crush a lot") that references the 1998 song "Still Not a Player" by Big Pun. Fat Joe, Ja Rule, and the song's two producers are credited as the writers of "What's Luv?", as are Big Pun and the lyricist of "What's Love Got to Do with It", Terry Britten.

"What's Luv?", released in the United States on February 4, 2002, peaked at number two on the US Billboard Hot 100 chart that April, becoming Fat Joe's highest-charting single as a lead artist. The single stayed on the chart for 20 weeks, giving Ashanti her second top-10 single and Fat Joe his first. The song additionally topped the Billboard Hot Rap Tracks and Rhythmic Top 40 charts. "What's Luv?" made Ashanti the first female artist to simultaneously occupy the top two positions on the Hot 100. The single was also a success internationally, reaching the top five in Australia, New Zealand, Switzerland, and the United Kingdom.

== Production ==
Producer Chris Lighty had introduced Fat Joe to producer Irv Gotti. After attending the funeral for rapper Big Pun together, Gotti offered "What's Luv?" to Fat Joe, with the chorus having already been written by Ja Rule. Fat Joe said that Ashanti recorded vocals for the demo, with the plan being to replace her on the record with Jennifer Lopez to appeal to the Latin market. When Joe heard the demo, he insisted on doing the record with Ashanti instead.

== Music video ==
The video for "What's Luv?" was filmed in New York City, at Fordham University. The music video features cameo appearances from DJ Kay Slay, Capone, Young Noble, Kastro, Treach, Fat Joe's son Ryan, Tony Sunshine, Maia Campbell as Tony's former then Joe's love interest and Remy Martin. Tommy Davidson and Miguel A. Núñez Jr. also appear in the video since the song was included in the 2002 film Juwanna Mann, in which Davidson and Núñez star, which plays on a TV behind Tony and Maia.

In the video, Joe starts dancing with some backup dancers, and also at times with Ashanti. One scene shows him attending a basketball game with two women as they watch from the stands. A scene with Ashanti shows her walking into a men's locker room, and rounding up with some men as she sings her verses from the song.

== Track listings ==
US 12-inch single

A1. "What's Luv?" (clean version featuring Ashanti) – 3:51
A2. "What's Luv?" (dirty version featuring Ashanti) – 3:51
A3. "What's Luv?" (instrumental) – 3:51
B1. "Definition of a Don" (clean version featuring Remy) – 3:54
B2. "Definition of a Don" (dirty version featuring Remy) – 3:54
B3. "Definition of a Don" (instrumental) – 3:55

European CD single

1. "What's Luv?" (explicit version featuring Ashanti)
2. "Hustlin'" (featuring Armageddon)

UK CD single

1. "What's Luv?" (clean version featuring Ashanti) – 3:51
2. "What's Luv?" (explicit version featuring Ashanti) – 3:51
3. "Hustlin'" (featuring Armageddon) – 3:34
4. "What's Luv?" (video—clean version featuring Ashanti) – 3:51

UK 12-inch single and Australian CD single

1. "What's Luv?" (clean version featuring Ashanti) – 3:51
2. "What's Luv?" (explicit version featuring Ashanti) – 3:51
3. "Hustlin'" (featuring Armageddon) – 3:34

== Credits and personnel ==
Credits are lifted from the European CD single liner notes.

Studio

- Recorded at The Crackhouse Studios (New York City)

Personnel

- Fat Joe – writing (as Joseph Cartagena), vocals, executive production
- Ja Rule – writing (as Jeffrey Atkins), vocals
- Christopher Rios – writing
- Irv Gotti – writing (as Irving Lorenzo), production, mixing
- Chink Santana – writing (as Andre Parker), production
- Terry Britten – lyrics ("What's Love Got to Do with It")
- Ashanti – vocals
- Armageddon – co-executive production
- Rob "Reef" Tewlow – co-executive production
- Milwaukee Buck – recording
- Thomas Bricker – art direction and design
- Piotr Sikora – photography

== Charts ==
=== Weekly charts ===
| Chart (2002) | Peak position |
|---|---|
| Australia (ARIA) | 4 |
| Australian Urban (ARIA) | 2 |
| Austria (Ö3 Austria Top 40) | 33 |
| Belgium (Ultratop 50 Flanders) | 23 |
| Belgium (Ultratop 50 Wallonia) | 16 |
| Canada (Nielsen SoundScan) | 12 |
| Canada CHR (Nielsen BDS) | 10 |
| Denmark (Tracklisten) | 16 |
| Europe (Eurochart Hot 100) | 4 |
| France (SNEP) | 27 |
| Germany (GfK) | 10 |
| Hungary (Single Top 40) | 8 |
| Ireland (IRMA) | 17 |
| Netherlands (Dutch Top 40) | 7 |
| Netherlands (Single Top 100) | 7 |
| New Zealand (Recorded Music NZ) | 5 |
| Norway (VG-lista) | 14 |
| Romania (Romanian Top 100) | 23 |
| Scottish Singles Sales (Official Charts) | 16 |
| Sweden (Sverigetopplistan) | 36 |
| Switzerland (Schweizer Hitparade) | 2 |
| UK Singles (Official Charts) | 4 |
| UK Hip Hop/R&B (Official Charts) | 1 |
| US Billboard Hot 100 | 2 |
| US Dance Singles Sales (Billboard) | 12 |
| US Hot R&B/Hip-Hop Songs (Billboard) | 3 |
| US Hot Rap Songs (Billboard) | 1 |
| US Pop Airplay (Billboard) | 3 |
| US Rhythmic Airplay (Billboard) | 1 |

=== Year-end charts ===
| Chart (2002) | Position |
|---|---|
| Australia (ARIA) | 49 |
| Australian Urban (ARIA) | 15 |
| Belgium (Ultratop 50 Flanders) | 89 |
| Belgium (Ultratop 50 Wallonia) | 67 |
| Europe (Eurochart Hot 100) | 81 |
| France (SNEP) | 86 |
| Germany (Media Control) | 95 |
| Netherlands (Dutch Top 40) | 39 |
| Netherlands (Single Top 100) | 37 |
| Switzerland (Schweizer Hitparade) | 21 |
| UK Singles (OCC) | 75 |
| UK Airplay (Music Week) | 43 |
| UK Urban (Music Week) | 4 |
| US Billboard Hot 100 | 8 |
| US Hot R&B/Hip-Hop Singles & Tracks (Billboard) | 17 |
| US Hot Rap Tracks (Billboard) | 4 |
| US Mainstream Top 40 (Billboard) | 17 |
| US Rhythmic Top 40 (Billboard) | 2 |

== Certifications ==
| Region | Certification | Certified units/sales |
|---|---|---|
| Australia (ARIA) | Gold | 35,000^{^} |
| New Zealand (RMNZ) | 3× Platinum | 90,000^{‡} |
| Sweden (GLF) | Gold | 15,000^{^} |
| United Kingdom (BPI) | Platinum | 600,000^{‡} |
^{^} Shipments figures based on certification alone.^{‡} Sales+streaming figures based on certification alone.

== Release history ==
| Region | Date | Format(s) | Label(s) | Ref. |
|---|---|---|---|---|
| United States | February 4, 2002 | Rhythmic contemporary; urban radio | Terror Squad Entertainment; Atlantic | |
| United States | February 25, 2002 | Contemporary hit radio | Terror Squad Entertainment; Atlantic | |
| Australia | May 6, 2002 | CD | Terror Squad Entertainment; Atlantic | |
| United Kingdom | May 13, 2002 | 12-inch vinyl; CD; cassette | Terror Squad Entertainment; Atlantic | |
