= Hype Williams videography =

This is a list is of music videos directed by Hype Williams.

== 1990s ==
=== 1991 ===
- BWP – "We Want Money"
- Main Source – "Just Hangin' Out"

=== 1992 ===
- Strictly Roots – "Duck the Boys in Blue"
- Zhigge – "Rakin' in the Dough"
- Cutty Ranks – "Living Condition"

=== 1993 ===
- Erick Sermon – "Hittin' Switches"
- Positive K – "I Got a Man" (version 1)
- Mangu – "La Playa"
- K7 – "Zunga Zeng"
- M.O.P. – "How About Some Hardcore"
- K7 – "Come Baby Come"
- Poor Righteous Teachers – "Nobody Move"
- Mysterme – "Unsolved Mysterme"

=== 1994 ===
- Sam Sneed feat. Dr. Dre – "U Better Recognize"
- Craig Mack feat. Notorious B.I.G., LL Cool J, Rampage and Busta Rhymes – "Flava in Ya Ear" (remix)
- Wu-Tang Clan – "Can It Be All So Simple"
- Jodeci – "Feenin'" (Co-directed with DeVante Swing)
- Mic Geronimo – "Shit's Real"
- Da Bush Babees – "We Run Things (It's Like That)"
- Gravediggaz – "Diary of a Madman"
- Craig Mack – "Get Down"
- Wu-Tang Clan – "Wu-Tang Clan Ain't Nuthing ta Fuck Wit/Shame on a Nigga"
- Miss Jones – "Where I Wanna Be Boy"
- Casserine – "Why Not Take All of Me"
- Mary J. Blige – "Be Happy" (co-directed with Sean "Diddy" Combs) (uncredited)
- Men At Large – "Let's Talk About It"
- Usher – "Think of You"
- Usher – "The Many Ways"

=== 1995 ===
- Snow – "Anything for You"
- Naughty by Nature – "Craziest"
- The Notorious B.I.G. – "One More Chance" (version 2: remix)
- Warren G – "So Many Ways"
- LL Cool J feat. Boyz II Men – "Hey Lover"
- LL Cool J – "Doin' It"
- Brandy – "Baby"
- The Notorious B.I.G. – "Warning"
- The Notorious B.I.G. – "Big Poppa" (co-directed with Sean "Diddy" Combs)
- Brandy feat. Queen Latifah, MC Lyte and Yo-Yo – "I Wanna Be Down" (version 2: remix)
- Adina Howard – "Freak Like Me"
- The Notorious B.I.G. – "One More Chance" (version 1)
- Guru feat. Chaka Khan – "Watch What You Say"
- Montell Jordan – "Somethin' 4 Da Honeyz" (version 1)
- Boyz II Men feat. Treach, Craig Mack, Busta Rhymes and Method Man – "Vibin'" (version 2)
- Brandy – "Sittin' Up in My Room"
- Blackstreet feat. SWV and Craig Mack – "Tonite's the Night" (remix)
- Hodge – "Head Nod" (remix)
- Mic Geronimo – "Masta I.C."
- OutKast – "Benz or Beamer"
- Ol' Dirty Bastard – "Shimmy Shimmy Ya/Baby C'Mon"
- Solo – "Where Do You Want Me to Put It"
- Lin Que feat. MC Lyte – "Let It Fall"
- Immature feat. Smooth – "We Got It"
- Double XX Posse – "Money Talks"
- A Few Good Men – "Tonite"
- Little Shawn feat. The Notorious B.I.G – "Dom Perignon"
- Brownstone feat. Craig Mack – "If You Love Me (Street Vibe Remix)"
- World Renown – "How Nice I Am"

=== 1996 ===
- Tupac Shakur feat. Dr. Dre and Roger Troutman – "California Love" (version 2: Mad Max, version 3: remix)
- D'Angelo – "Lady"
- R. Kelly feat. Ronald Isley – "Down Low (Nobody Has to Know)" (version 1)
- Busta Rhymes – "Woo Hah!! Got You All in Check" (version 1)
- R. Kelly – "Thank God It's Friday"
- Maxi Priest feat. Shaggy – "That Girl"
- Nas feat. Lauryn Hill – "If I Ruled the World (Imagine That)"
- Nas – "Street Dreams"
- Nas feat. R. Kelly – "Street Dreams (Remix)"
- A Tribe Called Quest – "1nce Again"
- Blackstreet feat. Dr. Dre and Queen Pen – "No Diggity"
- R. Kelly – "I Can't Sleep Baby (If I)" (remix)
- Brandy feat. Wanya Morris of Boyz II Men – "Brokenhearted" (Soulpower Remix)
- A Tribe Called Quest – "Stressed Out" (version 1)
- Jay-Z feat. Mary J. Blige – "Can't Knock the Hustle"
- LL Cool J feat. Total – "Loungin'" (remix)
- Foxy Brown feat. Blackstreet – "Get Me Home"
- R. Kelly – "I Believe I Can Fly"
- Group Therapy feat. Dr. Dre, RBX, KRS-One, B-Real and Nas – "East Coast West Coast Killaz"
- B-Real, Coolio, Method Man, LL Cool J and Busta Rhymes – "Hit 'Em High (The Monstars' Anthem)"
- Mista – "Blackberry Molasses"
- The Isley Brothers feat. R. Kelly – "Let's Lay Together"
- Total – "No One Else"
- Babyface feat. LL Cool J, Jody Watley, etc. – "This Is For The Lover In You"
- LL Cool J feat. Keith Murray, Prodigy, Fat Joe, and Foxy Brown – "I Shot Ya"
- R. Kelly – "I Can't Sleep (Baby If I)"
- R. Kelly – "Down Low Remix (Blame it on the Mo)"

=== 1997 ===
- Missy Elliott – "The Rain (Supa Dupa Fly)"
- Puff Daddy feat. Faith Evans and 112 – "I'll Be Missing You"
- R. Kelly – "Gotham City"
- The Notorious B.I.G. feat. Puff Daddy and Mase – "Mo Money Mo Problems"
- Mary J. Blige – "Everything"
- Busta Rhymes – "Put Your Hands Where My Eyes Could See"
- Missy Elliott feat. Da Brat – "Sock It 2 Me"
- Jay-Z feat. Foxy Brown and Babyface – "(Always Be My) Sunshine"
- Busta Rhymes – "Dangerous"
- Mase – "Feel So Good"
- Wild Orchid – "Supernatural"
- Will Smith – "Gettin' Jiggy wit It"
- Usher – "Nice and Slow"
- Refugee Camp All-Stars feat. Pras and Ky-Mani Marley – "Avenues"
- Scarface – "Mary Jane"
- R. Kelly – "Gotham City Remix"
- Snow – "Anything for You" (All-Star Cast Remix)
- The Firm - "Firm Biz"

=== 1998 ===
- DMX feat. Sheek Louch (The Lox) – "Get At Me Dog"
- DMX feat. Faith Evans – "How's It Goin' Down"
- Faith Evans – "Love Like This"
- Mel B feat. Missy Elliott – "I Want You Back"
- Jermaine Dupri feat. Mariah Carey – "Sweetheart"
- Mýa feat. Noreaga and Raekwon – "Movin' On"
- Kelly Price feat. R. Kelly and Ron Isley – "Friend of Mine"
- Busta Rhymes – "Gimme Some More'"
- DMX, Nas, Method Man and Ja Rule – "Grand Finale"
- Made Men feat. The Lox - "Tommy's Theme"
- R. Kelly – "Half on a Baby"
- R. Kelly feat. Keith Murray – "Home Alone"
- Taral Hicks – "Silly"
- Taral Hicks – "Ooh, Ooh Baby"

=== 1999 ===
- 112 feat. Lil' Zane – "Anywhere"
- TLC – "No Scrubs"
- Q-Tip – "I Can Do It"
- Ja Rule – "Holla Holla"
- Ja Rule – "Holla Holla (Remix)"
- Ja Rule feat. Cadillac Tah and Black Child – "Murda 4 Life"
- Ja Rule – "It's Murda/Kill 'Em All"
- Ja Rule feat. Ronald Isley – "Daddy's Little Baby"
- Ja Rule – "How Many Wanna"
- Method Man feat. D'Angelo – "Break Ups 2 Make Ups"
- Busta Rhymes – "Tear da Roof Off/Party Going on Over Here"
- Busta Rhymes feat. Janet Jackson – "What's It Gonna Be?"
- Nas feat. Puff Daddy – "Hate Me Now"
- Missy Elliott – "She's a Bitch"
- Mase feat. Blackstreet – "Get Ready"
- Noreaga – "Oh No"
- Puff Daddy feat. R. Kelly – "Satisfy You"
- Mobb Deep feat. Lil' Kim – "Quiet Storm" (version 2: remix)
- Dr. Dre feat. Snoop Dogg – "Still D.R.E."
- Q-Tip – "Vivrant Thing"
- Ol' Dirty Bastard feat. Kelis – "Got Your Money"
- Missy Elliott feat. Big Boi and Nicole – "All n My Grill"
- Kelis – "Caught out There"
- Mobb Deep feat. Nas – "It's Mine"
- Sisqó – "Got to Get It"
- Missy Elliott feat. Nas, Lil' Mo and Eve – "Hot Boyz"
- So Plush – "Things I've Heard Before"
- Q-Tip – "Breathe and Stop" (version 2)
- Bush – "Jesus Online" (canceled)

== 2000s ==
=== 2000 ===
- Jay-Z feat. UGK – "Big Pimpin'"
- No Doubt – "Ex-Girlfriend"
- Busta Rhymes – "Get Out!!"
- Macy Gray – "Why Didn't You Call Me"
- R. Kelly – "Bad Man"
- DMX feat. Sisqó – "What They Really Want"
- LL Cool J – "Imagine That"
- Wyclef Jean feat. The Rock – "It Doesn't Matter"
- Busta Rhymes – "Fire"
- Jay-Z feat. Memphis Bleek and Amil – "Hey Papi"
- Mýa feat. Jay-Z – "Best of Me (Holla Main Mix)"
- Funkmaster Flex feat. DMX – "Do You?"
- Roni Size & Reprazent – "Who Told You"
- Ja Rule feat. Lil' Mo and Vita – "Put It On Me"
- The Murderers – "We Don't Give A %^#$"
- The Murderers feat. Vita – "Vita, Vita, Vita"
- Kobe Bryant feat. Tyra Banks – "K.O.B.E."
- The Murderers feat Ja Rule, Vita, Black Child, Tah Murdah, Memphis Bleek and Busta Rhymes – "Holla Holla Remix"
- Crystal Sierra feat. Stylez Skillz – "Playa No More"
- Outsiderz 4 Life – "College Degree"

=== 2001 ===
- DMX – "Ain't No Sunshine"
- Busta Rhymes feat. Kelis – "What It Is/Grimey"
- Snoop Dogg feat. Tha Eastsidaz, Master P and Nate Dogg – "Lay Low"
- Eric Benet – "Love Don't Love Me"
- Babyface – "There She Goes"
- Vita – "Justify My Love"
- Lisa "Left Eye" Lopes – "The Block Party"
- Jessica Simpson – "A Little Bit"
- Ginuwine – "Differences"
- FUBU feat. LL Cool J, Keith Murray, and Ludacris – "Fatty Girl"
- Busta Rhymes – "As I Come Back/Break Ya Neck"
- Shelby Lynne – "Killin' Kind"
- Stella Soleil – "Kiss Kiss"
- Method Man – "Party & Bull%#!*"
- Aaliyah – "Rock the Boat"

=== 2002 ===
- N*E*R*D – "Rock Star" (unreleased version)
- Nelly Furtado – "...On the Radio (Remember the Days)"
- Boyz II Men – "The Color of Love"
- Blu Cantrell feat. Sean Paul – "Breathe" (remix)

=== 2003 ===
- Ashanti – "Rain on Me" (version 1)

=== 2004 ===
- Ja Rule feat. R. Kelly & Ashanti – "Wonderful"
- Ashanti – "Only U"
- Teedra Moses – "Be Your Girl"
- New Edition – "Hot 2Nite"
- Rupee – "Tempted to Touch"
- The Game feat. 50 Cent – "How We Do"

=== 2005 ===
- Queen Latifah feat. Al Green – "Simply Beautiful"
- Ashanti - "Only U" (version 2: Dance Version)
- Slim Thug feat. Bun B – "I Ain't Heard of That"
- Kanye West – "Diamonds from Sierra Leone"
- Kanye West feat. Jamie Foxx – "Gold Digger"
- Smitty – "Diamonds on My Neck"
- Robin Thicke feat. Pharrell Williams – "Wanna Love U Girl" (version 2)
- Jamie Foxx feat. Ludacris – "Unpredictable"
- Beyoncé feat. Slim Thug and Bun B – "Check on It"
- Pharrell Williams – "Angel"
- Ne-Yo – "So Sick"
- Killer Mike feat. Big Boi – "My Chrome"

=== 2006 ===
- LL Cool J feat. Jennifer Lopez – "Control Myself"
- Young Jeezy – "My Hood"
- Mary J. Blige – "Enough Cryin'"
- Hoobastank – "If I Were You"
- LL Cool J feat. Lyfe Jennings – "Freeze"
- Lil Jon feat. E-40 and Sean Paul (Youngbloodz) – "Snap Yo Fingers"
- Young Jeezy feat. Lil' Scrappy and T.I. – "Bang"
- Kanye West feat. Paul Wall, GLC and T.I. – "Drive Slow (Remix)"
- Pharrell Williams feat. Kanye West – "Number 1"
- Janet Jackson feat. Nelly – "Call on Me"
- John Legend – "Heaven"
- t.A.T.u. – "Gomenasai"

=== 2007 ===
- Kanye West – "Can't Tell Me Nothing"
- Twista feat. Pharrell – "Give It Up"
- Kenna – "Say Goodbye to Love"
- Kanye West – "Stronger"
- Fam-Lay – "The Beeper Record"
- Ja Rule – "Body"
- Jay-Z feat. Pharrell Williams – "Blue Magic"
- Lupe Fiasco feat. Matthew Santos – "Superstar"
- Ne-Yo – "Go On Girl"

=== 2008 ===
- Shaggy feat. Akon – "What's Love"
- Kanye West – "Homecoming"
- Sean Garrett feat. Ludacris – "Grippin'"
- Mary J. Blige – "Stay Down"
- Lloyd feat. Lil Wayne – "Girls Around the World"
- Coldplay – "Viva la Vida"
- N.E.R.D feat. CRS & Pusha T – "Everyone Nose (All the Girls ....) (Remix)"
- Common feat. Pharrell Williams – "Universal Mind Control"
- Common feat. Pharrell Williams - "Announcement (song)" (Version 2)
- Kanye West – "Heartless"
- DJ Khaled feat. Kanye West and T-Pain – "Go Hard"

=== 2009 ===
- Bow Wow feat. Jermaine Dupri – "Roc the Mic"
- Bow Wow feat. Jonhtá Austin – "You Can Get It All"
- Jamie Foxx feat. T-Pain – "Blame It"
- Busta Rhymes feat. T-Pain – "Hustler's Anthem '09"
- Kanye West feat. Young Jeezy – "Amazing"
- Kanye West – "Robocop" (unreleased)
- Swizz Beatz – "When I Step in the Club" (Hennessy Black commercial)
- The-Dream feat. Kanye West – "Walkin' on the Moon"
- Big Sean – "Getcha Some"
- Jamie Foxx feat. Kanye West, The-Dream and Drake – "Digital Girl (remix)"
- Consequence feat. Kanye West and John Legend – "Whatever U Want"
- Drake feat. Kanye West, Lil Wayne and Eminem – "Forever"
- Diddy – Dirty Money feat. The Notorious B.I.G. – "Angels"
- Dan Balan – "Chica Bomb"
- Mariah Carey – "I Want to Know What Love Is"
- Jay-Z feat. Alicia Keys – "Empire State of Mind"
- Beyoncé feat. Lady Gaga – "Video Phone" (Extended Remix)

== 2010s ==
=== 2010 ===
- Nicki Minaj – "Massive Attack"
- Audio feat. Akon – "Magnetic"
- Christina Aguilera – "Not Myself Tonight"
- Diddy – Dirty Money feat. Rick Ross and T.I. – "Hello Good Morning"
- Diddy – Dirty Money feat. Nicki Minaj and Rick Ross – "Hello Good Morning" (remix)
- Rick Ross feat. Kanye West – "Live Fast, Die Young"
- Jessica Mauboy feat. Snoop Dogg – "Get 'Em Girls"
- Bob Sinclar feat. Sean Paul – "Tik Tok"
- Ke$ha – "We R Who We R"
- Jessica Mauboy feat. Ludacris – "Saturday Night"
- Kanye West – "Runaway" (script)
- Busta Rhymes feat. Swizz Beatz – "Stop the Party" (canceled)

=== 2011 ===
- Lil Wayne feat. Cory Gunz – "6 Foot 7 Foot"
- Miguel – "Sure Thing"
- Kanye West feat. Rihanna – "All of the Lights"
- Kim Kardashian – "Jam (Turn It Up)"
- Big Sean feat. Kanye West and Roscoe Dash – "Marvin & Chardonnay"
- Coldplay – "Paradise" (unreleased)
- Ja Rule – "Real Life Fantasy"
- Josh Baze – "We Made It"
- Robin Thicke – "Love After War"
- Willow Smith feat. Nicki Minaj – "Fireball"

=== 2012 ===
- Nicki Minaj – "Stupid Hoe"
- Busta Rhymes feat. Chris Brown – "Why Stop Now"
- Brandy feat. Chris Brown – "Put It Down"
- Jack White – "Freedom at 21"
- DJ Khaled – "I Wish You Would" (feat. Kanye West and Rick Ross) / "Cold"
- Fat Joe feat. Kanye West – "Pride N Joy"
- Nicki Minaj – "Va Va Voom"
- Nicki Minaj – "Roman in Moscow" (unreleased)

=== 2013 ===
- Nikki Williams – "Glowing"
- Joe – "I'd Rather Have Love"
- Meek Mill – "Levels"
- Beyoncé feat. Jay-Z – "Drunk in Love"
- Beyoncé – "Blow"

=== 2014 ===
- Ludacris feat. Jeremih and Wiz Khalifa – "Party Girls"
- Future feat. Kanye West – "I Won"
- Common feat. Vince Staples – "Kingdom"
- Jennifer Lopez feat. Iggy Azalea – "Booty"

=== 2015 ===
- Jodeci – "Every Moment"
- Jennifer Lopez – "Feel the Light"
- Adam Lambert – "Ghost Town"
- Puff Daddy feat. Pharrell – "Finna Get Loose"
- The Neighbourhood – "R.I.P. 2 My Youth"
- Rick Ross feat. The Dream – "Money Dance"
- Puff Daddy – "Workin'"
- Puff Daddy & The Family feat. King Los, Styles P and Lil' Kim – "The Auction"

=== 2016 ===
- Travis Scott – "90210"
- Alicia Keys feat. ASAP Rocky – "Blended Family (What You Do For Love)"

=== 2017 ===
- Tyga feat. Desiigner – "Gucci Snakes"
- Dice Soho – "Giraffe"

=== 2018 ===
- Nicki Minaj feat. Ariana Grande – "Bed"
- Nicki Minaj – "Barbie Dreams"
- Post Malone feat. Nicki Minaj – "Ball for Me" (unreleased)

=== 2019 ===
- Megan Thee Stallion – "Cash Sh*t" (feat. DaBaby) (unreleased)

== 2020s ==
=== 2020 ===
- Griselda – "Dr. Birds"
- PartyNextDoor feat. Drake – "Loyal" (unreleased version)
- T.I. feat. Rahky – "Hypno"
- Future & Lil Uzi Vert – Pluto x Baby Pluto (promotion videos)
- Future & Lil Uzi Vert – "That's It"
- Future & Lil Uzi Vert – "Over Your Head"
- A Boogie wit da Hoodie & Young Thug – "Might Not Give Up"
- Kanye West – "Life Of The Party" (unreleased)

=== 2021 ===
- DJ Khaled feat. Nas, Jay-Z, James Fauntleroy and Harmonies by the Hive – "Sorry Not Sorry"

=== 2024 ===
- Five Finger Death Punch feat. DMX – "This Is the Way"

=== 2025 ===
- KITH Clothing Spring Collection feat. JADAKISS, FABOLOUS & LEXA GATES - "New York To The World"
- Kanye West - “Bully” (film)

=== 2026 ===
- T.I.- “Let 'Em Know”
- T.I.- "Mr. Him"
- Busta Rhymes - "Woman"
