= 1,000 Grams =

1,000 Grams, Vol. 1

Mixtape by Young Jeezy
- Released: August 12, 2010
- Genre: Hip-hop; Southern hip-hop
- Label: Corporate Thugz
- Producer: DJ Scream (Host DJ)

1,000 Grams, Vol. 1 is a mix-tape by American rapper Young Jeezy hosted by DJ Scream. It was released on August 12, 2010.

== Background ==
The mixtape has Jeezy rapping over samples of some of the most popular hip hop beats of 2010. The first track to be leaked from 1,000 Grams, was "Death B4 Dishonor", in which Jeezy samples Rick Ross' hit single "B.M.F. (Blowin' Money Fast)". On the track, Jeezy appears to be criticising Rick Ross by saying "How you blowin' money fast, you don't know the crew / Oh you're part of the fam, shit I never knew." However, in an interview with MTV, Jeezy claimed it was not a criticism and that the line was not aimed at anyone in particular. DJ Scream hosts this mixtape and has many tags on it; a tagless (or no DJ) version of the mixtape has also been released. This is volume one of what appeared to be a new series by Jeezy, but so far there have been no official statements on when volume 2 will be released.

== Critical reception ==
Professional ratings
Review scores
Source	Rating
Pitchfork Media	(4.2/10)
The Washington Post	(average)

Pitchfork's Tom Breihan wrote that the mixtape "seems to exist to support his opening salvo against Ross. And judging by the respective quality of both this tape and Ross' great new Teflon Don, Jeezy is heading for a big L here." David Malitz of The Washington Post called Jeezy's rhymes "cheaply glorifying" and the backing tracks "predictable". Sam Hockley-Smith of The Fader said that while most mixtapes in which the artist raps over other people's songs consist of "watered down versions of the original" tracks, Jeezy on this mixtape is "always stable. Never really varying in tempo too much, just working with any beat that gets thrown his way. It’s a pretty sweet example of why this guy has outlasted a lot of his peers."

== Track listing ==
- All songs performed by Jeezy.

#	Title	Length	Producer	Instrumentals/sample
1	"Intro"	2:05		
2	"Death B4 Dishonor"	3:25	Lex Luger	"B.M.F. (Blowin' Money Fast)" by Rick Ross
3	"Choppa N Da Paint"	3:08	Lex Luger	"Hard in da Paint" by Waka Flocka Flame
4	"Dope Boy Swag"	3:13	G5 Kids	"Pretty Boy Swag" by Soulja Boy
5	"In Da Wall"	2:24		"On the Wall" by Brisco
6	"Powder"	2:29	S1, Kanye West, Jeff Bhasker, Mike Dean	"Power" by Kanye West
7	"Whippin All of Dat"	2:25	Phenom	"Roger That" by Young Money
8	"Spray Something"	3:24	Timbaland, J-Roc	"Say Something" by Timbaland
9	"Yayo"	3:31	Danja, Timbaland, Carmelo Famouss	"Hello Good Morning" by Dirty Money
10	"Drug Dealin' Muzik"	2:43	L-Don Beatz	"O Let's Do It" by Waka Flocka Flame
11	"Popular Demand"	2:59		"Popular Demand" By Clipse
12	"Porsche Music"	3:13	The Olympicks	"Mafia Music 2" by Rick Ross
