= Live Fast Die Young =

Live Fast Die Young may refer to:

== Literature and film ==
- "Live fast, die young, and have a good-looking corpse", a quotation from the 1947 novel Knock on Any Door by Willard Motley and its 1949 film adaptation
- Live Fast, Die Young (film), a 1958 American film noir directed by Paul Henreid
- Live Fast, Die Young, a 2008 film by Christopher Showerman
- Live Fast, Die Young, a 2005 biography of James Dean by Lawrence Frascella and Al Weisel

== Music ==
- "Live Fast, Die Young" (song), by Rick Ross, 2010
- "Live Fast Die Young", a song by Black Tide from Light from Above, 2008
- "Live Fast Die Young", a song by Circle Jerks from Group Sex, 1980
- "Live Fast Die Young" a song by Sub Zero Project and Rebelion, 2022

== See also ==
- "Live Fast, Love Hard, Die Young", a 1955 song by Faron Young
