= Nothin' Move But the Money =

Single by Mic Geronimo featuring Puff Daddy and Kelly Price

from the album Vendetta
- B-side: "Usual Suspects"
- Released: January 24, 1998
- Recorded: 1997
- Genre: Hip hop
- Length: 4:44
- Label: TVT
- Songwriter: Michael McDermon
- Producers: Sean "Puffy" Combs; Daven "Prestige" Vanderpool

Mic Geronimo singles chronology
"Wherever You Are" (1996)	"Nothin' Move But the Money" (1998)

Puff Daddy singles chronology
"Been Around the World" (1997)	"Nothin' Move But the Money" (1998)	"Victory" (1998)

"Nothin' Move But the Money" is the lead single released from Mic Geronimo's second album, Vendetta.

The song was produced by Daven "Prestige" Vanderpool from Sean "Puffy" Combs' production team, The Hitmen, and featured vocals from Combs and R&B singer Kelly Price. The official remix featured verses from Black Rob and DMX and was produced by another Hitmen member Nashiem Myrick.

The song became Geronimo's most successful single, becoming his only appearance on the Billboard Hot 100. The official music video was directed by Christopher Erskin.

The song features samples from Nona Hendryx's 1983 single, Transformation.

== Single track listing ==
=== A-side ===
1. "Nothin' Move But the Money" (Radio version)
2. "Nothin' Move But the Money" (Album version)
3. "Nothin' Move But the Money" (Instrumental version)
4. "Nothin' Move But the Money" (A cappella version)

=== B-side ===
1. "Usual Suspects" (Radio version)
2. "Usual Suspects" (Album version)
3. "Usual Suspects" (Instrumental version)

== Charts ==
Chart (1998)	Peak position
US Billboard Hot 100	70
US Hot R&B/Hip-Hop Songs (Billboard)	31
US Hot Rap Songs (Billboard)	11
Billboard Hot Dance Music/Maxi-Singles Sales	3
