= Vendetta (Mic Geronimo album) =

Studio album by Mic Geronimo
- Released: November 4, 1997
- Recorded: 1997
- Genre: Hip hop
- Length: 51:34
- Label: TVT
- Producer: Daven "Prestige" Vanderpool, Puff Daddy, Legendary Traxter, Havoc, Lil Rob, K-Def, Chris Large, Chris "Ju Ju" Whitney, Ghetto Melody, Pete Rock, Prince Kaysaan, Royal Flush, Buckwild

Mic Geronimo chronology
The Natural (1995)	Vendetta (1997)

Singles from Vendetta
- 1. "Nothin' Move But the Money" Released: January 24, 1998; 2. "Vendetta" Released: April 11, 1998

Vendetta is the second album by rapper Mic Geronimo, released on November 4, 1997, through TVT Records.

The album was produced by Marley Marl and Pete Rock, among others. It was an improvement on the Billboard charts over his previous album, peaking at number 112 on the Billboard 200 and number 20 on the Top R&B/Hip-Hop Albums chart. The album also featured his only Billboard Hot 100 hit, "Nothin' Move But the Money", which managed to find minor-success and peaked at number 70 on the chart. The album is now out of print.

There is a version of "Usual Suspects" which features Hussein Fatal in place of Tragedy Khadafi and The LOX. It is uncertain which version of the song is the original.

== Critical reception ==
Professional ratings
Review scores
Source	Rating
AllMusic	4/5 stars
The Source	3.5/5 stars

AllMusic's Leo Stanley was critical of the Puff Daddy-produced "Nothin' Move But the Money" but gave praise to the "R&B-flavored productions" throughout the album and Geronimo's rhyming abilities that make Vendetta worth listening for people.

== Track listing ==
No.	Title	Length
1.	"Nothin' Move But the Money" (featuring Puff Daddy and Kelly Price)	4:44
2.	"Vendetta"	4:09
3.	"Survival"	3:41
4.	"Life n Lessons"	4:38
5.	"For tha Family"	3:39
6.	"Street Life" (featuring Monifah)	4:39
7.	"Be Like Mic"	4:34
8.	"Unstoppable"	4:04
9.	"Single Life" (featuring Carl Thomas and Jay-Z)	4:16
10.	"Things Ain't What They Used to Be"	3:54
11.	"How You Been?" (featuring Khadejia Bass)	4:36
12.	"Usual Suspects" (featuring DMX, Ja Rule, the LOX and Tragedy Khadafi)	4:40

== Samples ==
Nothin' Move but the Money

- "Transformation" by Nona Hendryx

Life n Lessons

- "Stop on By" by Rufus & Chaka Khan

For tha Family

- "Pastures" by Ahmad Jamal

Street Life

- "Second to None" by Atlantic Starr
- "Risin' to the Top" by Keni Burke

Unstoppable

- "Poor Abbey Walsh" by Marvin Gaye
- "The Champ" by the Mohawks
- "Dizzy" by Hugo Montenegro

Single Life

- "Single Life" by Cameo

Things Ain't What They Used to Be

- "Touching You" by Stanley Turrentine
- "Mercy Mercy Me (The Ecology)" by Marvin Gaye

Usual Suspects

- "Mango Meat" by Mandrill
- "UFO" by ESG

== Charts ==
Chart (1997)	Peak position
US Billboard 200	112
US Heatseekers Albums (Billboard)	2
US Top R&B/Hip-Hop Albums (Billboard)	20
