= B.M.F. (Blowin' Money Fast) =

Single by Rick Ross featuring Styles P

from the album Teflon Don
- Released: June 29, 2010
- Genre: Gangsta rap; Southern hip hop; trap
- Length: 4:16
- Label: Maybach, Slip-n-Slide, Def Jam
- Songwriters: Lexus Lewis, William Roberts, David Styles
- Producer: Lex Luger

Rick Ross singles chronology
"Super High" (2010)	"B.M.F. (Blowin' Money Fast)" (2010)	"Live Fast, Die Young" (2010)

Styles P singles chronology
"Blow Ya Mind" (2007)	"B.M.F. (Blowin' Money Fast)" (2010)	"Send a Kite" (2010)

"B.M.F. (Blowin' Money Fast)" is the second single from Rick Ross' fourth studio album Teflon Don. It features Styles P. It was produced by Lex Luger. The song was originally released as an unmastered version on Ross' promotional mixtape, the Albert Anastasia EP. The song was named as MTV News' #4 Song of 2010.

== Remixes ==
Spose, Papoose, Yo Gotti, Haystak, Cuban Link, Brabo Gator, French Montana, Hot Dollar, Skepta, Lil' Flip, Yelawolf, Jermaine Dupri, Tyga, Frenchie and Bun B have recorded their own remixes to the song. Lupe Fiasco remixed the song under the name "Building Minds Faster". Spose recorded a remix for his successful collaborative mixtape titled We Smoked It All Vol. II with label mate Cam Groves. Jeezy made a remix for the song titled Death B4 Dishonor on his mixtape 1,000 Grams which was originally thought to be a Rick Ross diss, but was later revealed by Jeezy that it was a misunderstanding. Ross replied to Jeezy's "Death Before Dishonor" on August 12, 2010, called "The Summa's Mine". Trademark da Skydiver and Curren$y also made a remix to this song, entitled "J.E.T.S.". Slovak rapper Rytmus also has recorded his own version titled "BMF (Best rapper in Europe)" supported by video.

== Music video ==
The music video premiered on July 13, 2010, and was directed by Parris. It was premiered on BET's 106 & Park on August 2, 2010. Diddy, Bun B, DJ Envy, Jadakiss, Triple C's, Gunplay, Sheek Louch, DJ Khaled, DJ Clue, Young Jeezy, Trick Daddy, Mack Maine, Ace Hood, Plies, Fabolous, Fat Joe, Shawty Lo, Cassie and Lex Luger, the song's producer, appear in the music video.

== Cultural references ==
The title itself, "BMF", is a reference to the gang Black Mafia Family. Ross then shouts out the gang's founder Demetrius "Big Meech" Flenory when he raps the line, "I think I'm Big Meech". In the following line, he references Larry Hoover, former leader of the Black Gangster Disciple Nation.

Flenory himself has stated that he is a fan of the record.

Styles P also made a reference to the video game, Red Dead Redemption.

Ross also uses "Archie Bunker" as a synonym for cocaine. Archie Bunker was a white character in All in the Family who frequently made prejudiced or racist remarks.

The song was covered on the second part of the "History of Rap" skit by Jimmy Fallon and Justin Timberlake on the Jimmy Fallon Show.

MLB player Will Benson used the song as his walk-up music.

== Charts ==
"B.M.F" debuted at No. 60 on the Billboard Hot 100.

=== Weekly charts ===
Chart (2010)	Peak position
US Billboard Hot 100	60
US Hot R&B/Hip-Hop Songs (Billboard)	6
US Hot Rap Songs (Billboard)	4
US Rhythmic Airplay (Billboard)	28

=== Year-end charts ===
Chart (2010)	Position
US Hot R&B/Hip-Hop Songs (Billboard)	40

== Certifications ==
Region	Certification	Certified units/sales
United States (RIAA)	Platinum	1,000,000^{‡}
^{‡} Sales+streaming figures based on certification alone.
