= Super High =

Single by Rick Ross featuring Ne-Yo

from the album Teflon Don
- Released: May 4, 2010
- Recorded: 2010
- Genre: Mafioso rap; R&B
- Length: 3:48
- Label: Maybach, Slip-n-Slide, Def Jam
- Songwriters: Emanuel Johnson, Knight, Mark Richardson, Mike Stokes, Roberts, Shaffer Chimere Smith, Jr.
- Producers: DJ Clark Kent & The Remedy

Rick Ross singles chronology
"Maybach Music 2" (2009)	"Super High" (2010)	"B.M.F. (Blowin' Money Fast)" (2010)

Ne-Yo singles chronology
"Angels Cry" (2010)	"Super High" (2010)	"Beautiful Monster" (2010)

"Super High" is the first single from rapper Rick Ross from his fourth studio album Teflon Don. The song features Ne-Yo.

The song samples "Silly Love Song" by Enchantment.

== Music video ==
The music video premiered on May 24, 2010 on MTV Jams. The F. Gary Gray-directed video stars actress Stacey Dash. The song contains samples of "Gangsta Gangsta" by N.W.A and the drum break of Barry White's "I'm Gonna Love You Just A Little Bit More Babe".

== Remixes ==
The official remix is called the "Sativa Remix" and features Ne-Yo, Curren$y & Wiz Khalifa. A viral music video was also released. Another remix was released featuring Ace Hood and Wiz Khalifa instead of Curren$y.

== Charts ==
Chart (2010)	Peak position
U.S. Billboard Hot 100	100
U.S. Billboard Hot R&B/Hip-Hop songs	19
U.S. Billboard Rap Songs	13
German Black Chart	35
