= Mic Geronimo =

American rapper

- Born: Michael Craig McDermon; September 14, 1973 (age 52)
- Origin: Queens, New York City, New York
- Genres: Hip hop
- Years active: 1994–present
- Labels: Blunt; TVT Records

Michael Craig McDermon (born September 14, 1973, in Queens, New York), better known by his stage name Mic Geronimo, is an American rapper who was acquainted with Irv Gotti of Murder Inc. Gotti and his brother met Mic Geronimo at a Queens high school talent show, and Mic agreed to record a single ("Shit's Real"), which became a classic underground hit. Mic Geronimo landed a deal with Blunt/TVT Records and debuted with the 1995 LP The Natural. His song "Wherever You Are" was sampled by Moby for the track "Jam for the Ladies" in 2002.

The 1997 album Vendetta saw him with a higher profile, working with Jay-Z, Ja Rule, DMX, the LOX and Puff Daddy on the single "Nothin' Move but the Money", the video for which featured porn star Heather Hunter. The video was supposed to be shot by director Hype Williams, but Hype was filming an Usher video, so instead this became the first video directed by Christopher Erskin, who later directed the 2004 film Johnson Family Vacation.

In 2003, Mic Geronimo released Long Road Back, followed by Alive 9/14/73 in 2007.

== Discography ==
=== Studio albums ===
Year	Title	Chart positions	
Year	Title	U.S.	U.S. R&B
1995	The Natural: Released: November 28, 1995; Label: TVT	144	23
1997	Vendetta: Released: November 4, 1997; Label: TVT	112	20
2003	Long Road Back: Released: April 8, 2003; Label: Warlock		
2007	Alive 9/17/73: Released: April 24, 2007; Label: Hbd Label Group		

=== Singles ===
Year	Single	Chart positions			Album
Year	Single	U.S. Hot 100	U.S. R&B	U.S. Rap	Album
1994	"Shit's Real"	117	89	23	The Natural
1995	"Masta I.C."	–	–	30	The Natural
1995	"The Natural"	–	–	42	The Natural
1996	"Wherever You Are"	–	–	43	The Natural
1998	"Nothin' Move But the Money"	70	31	11	Vendetta
2003	"Up Now"				Long Road Back
2021	"Smoke"				
2021	"The One"				
2021	"Got EM"				
2022	"The Bag"				
2025	"First Take"				
2025	"Ghost Gun"				
