= Teflon Don (album) =

Studio album by Rick Ross
- Released: July 20, 2010
- Recorded: 2009–2010
- Genres: Hip-hop; trap; mafioso rap
- Length: 49:17
- Labels: Maybach; Slip-n-Slide; Def Jam
- Producers: Rick Ross (exec.); Clark Kent; Danja; The Inkredibles; J.U.S.T.I.C.E. League; Kanye West; Lex Luger; No I.D.; The Olympicks; The Remedy

Rick Ross chronology
Deeper Than Rap (2009)	Teflon Don (2010)	God Forgives, I Don't (2012)

Singles from Teflon Don
- 1. "Super High" Released: May 4, 2010; 2. "B.M.F. (Blowin' Money Fast)" Released: June 29, 2010; 3. "Live Fast, Die Young" Released: July 11, 2010; 4. "Aston Martin Music" Released: October 5, 2010

Teflon Don is the fourth studio album by American rapper Rick Ross, released on July 20, 2010, on Maybach Music Group, Slip-n-Slide Records and Def Jam Recordings. Production for the album took place during 2009 to 2010 and was handled by several record producers, including Clark Kent, No I.D., The Olympicks, J.U.S.T.I.C.E. League, Lex Luger, Danja, The Inkredibles, The Remedy, and Kanye West.

The album debuted at number two on the US Billboard 200 chart, selling 176,300 copies in its first week. It attained some international charting and produced three singles with moderate Billboard chart success. On its release, Teflon Don received generally positive reviews from most music critics, earning praise for its cinematic production and Ross' lyrical persona. Based on an average score of 79 at Metacritic, it remains Ross's most critically acclaimed album to date.

== Background ==
In 2010, Ross announced to MTV that his next album would be entitled Teflon Don. On the remix to his earlier single, "Maybach Music 2", DJ Khaled hyped the album, along with "Maybach Music III". In April 2010, on his official website, he stated that "Super High" would be the first single. Artists Kanye West, Jay-Z, T.I., Raphael Saadiq, and Drake were confirmed to be represented on the album. Producers for the album included West and No I.D.

== Release and promotion ==
The album was set for release on June 29, 2010, but was pushed back twice to a July 20 release date. It was released through Maybach Music Group and Def Jam Recordings. Ross supported the album with his international Blowin' Money Fast Tour.

=== Singles ===
The album's first single, "Super High" featuring Ne-Yo, peaked at number 100 on the US Billboard Hot 100. Its music video received airplay on MTV and BET. The album's second single, "B.M.F. (Blowin' Money Fast)", was released on June 29, 2010, and features the rapper Styles P. The song reached number 60 on the Billboard Hot 100. The radio single was "Live Fast Die Young" which was sent to Rhythm/Crossover radio on July 13, 2010. It did not receive promotion and did not chart. The song "Aston Martin Music", featuring the Canadian rapper Drake and the American singer Chrisette Michele, debuted at number 98 on the Billboard Hot 100 after heavy downloads the week of the album's release. "Aston Martin Music" was released as the album's third single on October 5, 2010. It peaked at number 30, making it the highest peaking single from the album.

== Critical reception ==
Professional ratings
Aggregate scores
Source	Rating
Metacritic	79/100
Review scores
Source	Rating
AllMusic	4/5 stars
The A.V. Club	B
Billboard	4.5/5 stars
Entertainment Weekly	B+
Los Angeles Times	3.5/4 stars
Pitchfork	8.0/10
Rolling Stone	3.5/5 stars
Spin	8/10
USA Today	3/4 stars
XXL	4/5

Teflon Don received critical acclaim from music critics. At Metacritic, which assigns a normalized rating out of 100 to reviews from mainstream critics, the album received an average score of 79, based on 18 reviews, which indicates "generally favorable reviews". Critics noted it as Ross's strongest album at the time and found its production cinematic and "epic". AllMusic writer David Jeffries gave the album 4 out of 5 stars and viewed it as an improvement over Ross's previous album Deeper Than Rap, stating "Teflon plays up the chilled and soulful elements of its predecessor, meaning Ross has graduated to a level where words like 'organic' and 'poignant' come into play". Entertainment Weekly's Simon Vozick-Levinson called Ross "a competent rapper" and complimented his "ear for lush, expansive beats". Jon Caramanica of The New York Times described him as "a ferocious character, an impressive rapper... a clever and loose thinker" and wrote that Teflon Don "establishes him as one of rap's most potent and creative forces". Sean Fennessey of The Washington Post praised Ross's lyricism and wrote that he "is an enunciator of the highest order, his voice a tidal wave baritone... his word choice and onomatopoetic gestures... are unmatched in rap right now". Brian Richardson of Tiny Mix Tapes gave it 3½ out of 5 stars and wrote "he employs such confidence and panache staying within his limitations". XXL writer Rob Markman gave the album an XL rating and stated "if it is simply judged on the music, Teflon Don is damn near spotless. The lyrics are on par, the beats are lush, and the imagery is larger than life".

However, some critics thought that the album favored style over substance and criticized Ross's lyrics. Slant Magazine's Jesse Cataldo wrote that "despite fitful spots of brilliance, [it] feels distinctly swampy... too often comes off as a conspicuous mishandling of both assets and signifiers: too much drug posturing, too much repetition, too little real effort". OC Weekly writer Nate Jackson gave the album a C+ rating and stated "Ross squanders opportunities to expand the content of his verses beyond the digits of his bankroll". Nathan Rabin of The A.V. Club gave it a B rating and stated "Producers [...] provide lush, cinematic, larger-than-life soundscapes for Ross' crass consumerism, while classy guest vocalists [...] regularly outshine the star... the only thing deep about Ross are his pockets and his rumbling voice. Teflon Don excels as sleek, smooth, shiny pop escapism, pure and simple". Wesley Case of The Baltimore Sun noted his lyrics as "sleek, too-often shallow", but praised its "elegance" and "grandiose stunting". USA Today's Steve Jones gave the album 3 out of 4 stars and wrote that Ross's "booming voice and colorful tales of ill-gotten wealth are hard to ignore. His Maybach music always sounds good rattling the trunk, even if your ride is less ostentatious". Ian Cohen of Pitchfork compared the album's embracement of "an aura of dominance" to late-1990s hip-hop music and elaborated on its indulgent Mafioso-themes and sound, stating:

Ross' greatest gift is the ability to conjure a fully-formed Planet Boss, a refuge from the dwindling fortunes of gangsta rap and the general economic downturn ... J.U.S.T.I.C.E. League, No I.D., and Kanye West create beats that really do sound like they're fantastically out of reach to anyone but the financial elite, and you can hear every dollar that went into the record ... Lyrics that might look clumsy on paper turn into grand pronouncements through pure self-belief. And like a great action hero, Ross never lets cleverness get in the way of saying something memorable. Understandably, money is about the only tie Planet Boss has to reality, and nearly every interaction can be broken down as a financial transaction.

— Ian Cohen

Saxon Baird of PopMatters viewed that Ross's performance compensates for his "wet-dream fantastical lyrics" and stated "Ross is good at what he does and rap needs guys like him to liven up the party and get us hyped". Rolling Stone writer Jody Rosen complimented Ross's "gloating with wit and goofiness", stating "[he] pours out smart rhymes over sleek, synth-heavy beats". Tray Hova of Vibe lauded Ross's "penchant for exaggerated 16s and larger-than-life soundscapes" and "knack for picking colossal beats". Ben Detrick of Spin commented on Ross's assumption of his "kingpin" persona, stating "If the Miami rapper has been a shell, though, he's become Fabergé on Teflon Don, his fourth and best album. The songs here are baroquely structured, richly musical creations with humor and emotional depth". Jayson Greene of The Village Voice noted Ross's subject matter as "transcendent absurdity" and called the album "ridiculously extravagant and extravagantly ridiculous". Los Angeles Times writer Jeff Weiss gave it 3½ out of 4 stars and commended Ross's "chimerical mythologizing", while noting its sound as "beautifully constructed... a symphonic grandeur to match Ross' elaborate delusions". Steve Juon of RapReviews gave Teflon Don a 7.5/10 rating and wrote "Over a short but impactful 50 minutes of music, the gravelly guru of hustling expands his repertoire beyond debates about authenticity... he's still able to weave together dope beats with great stories". was number 30 on Rolling Stone's list of the 30 Best Albums of 2010. Pitchfork placed it at number 38 on its list "The Top 50 Albums of 2010". In 2012, Complex named the album one of the classic albums of the previous decade.

== Commercial performance ==
Teflon Don debuted at number two on the US Billboard 200 chart behind Eminem's Recovery, with first-week sales of 176,300 copies. It is Ross's first album not to debut at number one in the United States. It also entered at number two on Billboard's R&B/Hip-Hop Albums, Rap Albums and Digital Albums charts. In its second week, the album dropped to number three on the chart, selling 63,000 copies. In its third week, the album dropped to number five on the chart, selling 39,000 copies that week. On November 10, 2010, the album was certified gold by the Recording Industry Association of America for sales of over 500,000 copies in the United States. As of May 2012, the album had sold 724,000 copies in the US.

In the United Kingdom, the album entered the UK Albums Chart at number 169, and also at number 23 on the Top 40 RnB Albums chart. In Canada, it debuted at number 17 on the Top 100 Albums chart.

== Track listing ==
Writers for Teflon Don adapted from physical edition booklet.

No.	Title	Writer(s)	Producer(s)	Length
1.	"I'm Not a Star"	William Leonard Roberts II; Erik Ortiz; Kevin Crowe	J.U.S.T.I.C.E. League	3:00
2.	"Free Mason" (featuring Jay-Z)	Roberts II; Maurice Carpenter; Leigh Elliott; Lenny Mollings; Johnny Mollings; John Stephens; Shawn Carter	The Inkredibles	4:07
3.	"Tears of Joy" (featuring Cee Lo Green)	Roberts II; Bobby Seale; Dion Wilson; Thomas DeCarlo Callaway; Willie McKinley Hutchison	No I.D.	5:33
4.	"Maybach Music III" (featuring T.I., Jadakiss & Erykah Badu)	Roberts II; Ortiz; Crowe; Clifford Joseph Harris Jr.; Erica Abi Wright; Jason Phillips	J.U.S.T.I.C.E. League	4:26
5.	"Live Fast, Die Young" (featuring Kanye West)	Roberts II; Frederick Knight; Marvin Gaye; Kanye West	Kanye West	6:13
6.	"Super High" (featuring Ne-Yo)	Roberts II; Knight; Emanuel Johnson; Mark Richardson; Mike Stokes Shaffer Chimere Smith Jr.	Clark Kent; The Remedy for F.A.T.E.; LLC	3:46
7.	"No. 1" (featuring Diddy & Trey Songz)	Roberts II; Floyd Nathaniel Hills; Sean John Combs; Tremaine Aldon Neverson	Danja	3:54
8.	"MC Hammer" (featuring Gucci Mane)	Roberts II; Louis K. Burell; Michael Kelly; James Earley; Felton Pilate; Lex Luger; Radric Davis; Stanley Kirk Burrell	Lex Luger	4:59
9.	"B.M.F. (Blowin' Money Fast)" (featuring Styles P)	Roberts II; Lewis; David Styles	Lex Luger	4:10
10.	"Aston Martin Music" (featuring Drake & Chrisette Michele)	Roberts II; Crowe; Ortiz; Aubrey Drake Graham; Chrisette Michele Payne	J.U.S.T.I.C.E. League	4:30
11.	"All the Money in the World" (featuring Raphael Saadiq)	Roberts II; David Stokes; Jayson James; Kyle Miller; Brian Parker; Bob Wicler; Charles Ray Wiggins	The Olympicks	4:40
Total length:				49:17

iTunes bonus track
No.	Title	Writer(s)	Producer(s)	Length
12.	"Audio Meth" (featuring Raekwon)	Roberts II; Albert Johnson; Andrew Harr; Corey Woods; Jermaine Jackson; Kejuan Muchita	The Runners	3:33

Notes

- "Free Mason" features additional vocals from John Legend

Sample credits

- "Tears of Joy" contains a sample of "Hospital Prelude of Love Theme" by Willie Hutch and an interpolation of "D.O.A. (Death of Auto-Tune)" by Jay-Z
- "Maybach Music III" contains a sample of "Ancient Source" by Caldera
- "Live Fast, Die Young" contains a sample of "If This World Were Mine" by The Bar-Kays, "Uphill Peace Of Mind" by Kid Dynamite and "Funky President (People It's Bad)" by James Brown
- "Super High" contains a sample of "Silly Love Song" by Enchantment and "Gangsta Gangsta" by N.W.A
- "No.1" contains a sample of "Hello Good Morning" by Diddy Dirty Money
- "MC Hammer" contains a vocal sample of "Too Legit to Quit" by MC Hammer
- "Aston Martin Music" contains an interpolation of "I Need Love" by LL Cool J
- "Audio Meth" contains an interpolation of "Shook Ones (Part II)" by Mobb Deep

== Personnel ==
Credits for Teflon Don adapted from AllMusic.

- Chris Athens – mastering
- Chris Atlas – marketing
- Inderan K. Bailey – assistant
- Gabriel Bartolomei – drums
- Scott Berger-Felder – engineer
- Alex "Gucci Pucci" Bethune – A&R
- Jeff Bhasker – keyboards
- Chris Bonawandt – engineer
- Leslie Brathwaite – mixing
- Kidus Henok – A&R
- Adam Brooks – conductor, French horn
- Dee Brown – assistant
- Leesa D. Brunson – A&R
- Tanner Chung – cello
- Andre Cleghorn – bass guitar
- Andrew Colella – viola
- Andrew Dawson – engineer
- Ben Diehl – engineer
- Kaye Fox – vocals
- Samuel Gibbs – trombone
- Jacob Goins – violin
- Jaymz Hardy-Martin III – engineer
- Eldwardo "Eddie Mix" Hernandez – engineer
- Nate "Danja" Hills – producer
- Keith "Pika" Holme – stylistic assistant
- The Inkredibles – producer
- Derrick Jackson – trombone
- Rennie Johnson – electric guitar
- Darrel Jones – viola
- Terese Joseph – A&R
- J.U.S.T.I.C.E. League – producer, additional production
- Sang Kang – cello
- Gimel "Young Guru" Keaton – engineer, mixing
- Clark Kent – producer
- Khaled Khaled – A&R
- Anthony Kilhoffer – engineer
- Rob Kinelski – engineer
- Brent Kolatalo – instrumentation
- Anthony Kronfle – assistant
- Juliene Kung – viola
- Stephen Lawrence – violin
- John Legend – vocals, background vocals
- Ken Lewis – instrumentation
- Tai Linzie – artwork, photo coordination
- Andre Lipscomb – assistant
- Michael Lu – violin
- Lex Luger – producer
- Phil Mallory – bass guitar
- Jonathan Mannion – photography
- Deborah Mannis-Gardner – sample clearance
- Marlon Marcel – engineer
- Graham Marsh – engineer
- Connie Mitchell – vocals
- Latoya Murray-Berry – stylist
- Edward J. "Uk" Nixon – engineer
- No I.D. – producer
- The Olympicks – producer
- Duncan Osborn – violin
- Joe Peluso – mixing
- Poobs – engineer
- Kevin Randolph – keyboards
- Remedy – producer
- Derek Roche – stylist
- Rick Ross – executive producer
- TaVon Sampson – art direction, design
- Ray Seay – mixing
- Noah Shebib – engineer
- Antonie Swain – trombone
- Matthew Testa – engineer
- Forrest Watkins – French horn
- Kanye West – producer
- Jonathan White – viola
- Edward Williams III – trumpet
- Tony Williams – – background vocals
- Brandon Wilson – trumpet
- Steve Wyreman – guitar
- Jordan "DJ Swivel" Young – engineer
- Tina Yu – violin

== Charts ==
=== Weekly charts ===
Chart (2010)	Peak position
Canadian Albums (Billboard)	17
UK Albums (OCC)	169
UK R&B Albums (Official Charts)	23
US Billboard 200	2
US Top R&B/Hip-Hop Albums (Billboard)	2
US Top Rap Albums (Billboard)	2

=== Year-end charts ===
Chart (2010)	Position
US Billboard 200	55
US Top R&B/Hip-Hop Albums (Billboard)	18
Chart (2011)	Position
US Top R&B/Hip-Hop Albums (Billboard)	38

== Certifications ==
Region	Certification	Certified units/sales
United States (RIAA)	Gold	500,000^{^}
^{^} Shipments figures based on certification alone.
