= Power (Kanye West song) =

Single by Kanye West

from the album My Beautiful Dark Twisted Fantasy
- Released: July 1, 2010
- Recorded: 2009–2010
- Genre: Hip hop; rap rock
- Length: 4:52 (album version); 1:34 (video version)
- Label: Roc-A-Fella; Def Jam
- Songwriters: Kanye West; Larry Griffin; Michael Dean; Jeff Bhasker; Andwele Gardner; Ken Lewis; Francois Bernheim; Jean-Pierre Lang; Boris Bergman; Robert Fripp; Michael Giles; Greg Lake; Ian McDonald; Peter Sinfield; Ronald Isley; O'Kelly Isley; Rudolph Isley; Billy Carter; Harold Cowart; Jimmy O'Rourke; Ron Ziegler
- Producers: S1; Kanye West; Jeff Bhasker; Mike Dean

Kanye West singles chronology
"We Are the World 25 for Haiti" (2010)	"Power" (2010)	"Live Fast, Die Young" (2010)

Music video
- "Power" on YouTube

"Power" (often stylized as "POWER") is a song by American rapper Kanye West, released as the lead single from his fifth studio album, My Beautiful Dark Twisted Fantasy (2010). The song features additional vocals by soul singer Dwele and is co-produced by West and produced by Symbolyc One. It is built around samples of "21st Century Schizoid Man" by King Crimson, "Afromerica" by Continent Number 6, and "It's Your Thing" by Cold Grits. After having recorded it in Hawaii, West reported that 5,000 man-hours were spent developing "Power". In its lyrics, West comments about the United States, his mental health and his critics. Its chorus features an abrasive vocal-riff.

"Power" was West's comeback single following his 2008 album 808s & Heartbreak and his controversial incident with Taylor Swift at the 2009 MTV Video Music Awards. The song received critical acclaim, and was listed among the best tracks of 2010 by several publications, including Time, Pitchfork Media, Spin, and Rolling Stone. Critics described it as a return to form for West, praising its intricate production, lyrical merit, and scope. It was nominated for a Grammy Award for Best Rap Solo Performance at the 53rd Grammy Awards.

The song debuted on the Billboard Hot 100 at position 22 and thereafter declined. The track was promoted by a music video, which was directed by Marco Brambilla. The video features a long take of the camera pulling away from West. The video received positive reviews from critics and received two nominations for MTV Video Music Awards. West performed the song on Saturday Night Live, at the 2010 BET Awards, at the 2011 Coachella Music Festival, and his Watch the Throne Tour. A remix of the track featuring Jay-Z was released on August 20, 2010, as a part of West's weekly GOOD Fridays series. On January 6, 2025 the song reached 1 billion streams on Spotify.

== Background ==
2009 was a troubled year for Kanye West, who had faced various controversies, including the divisive nature of his previous album, 808s & Heartbreak and his interruption of country singer-songwriter Taylor Swift at the 2009 MTV Video Music Awards during her acceptance speech. West explained that the motivation of some of his questionable decisions stemmed from over-work. The ensuing media controversy caused West to exile himself to Oahu, Hawaii and record his fifth studio album mostly in a reclusive nature, shying away from collaborating with artists he was not personally close to. While composing the album, West assembled a large staff of established producers including Pete Rock, RZA and Q-Tip, with West handling portions of the production himself.

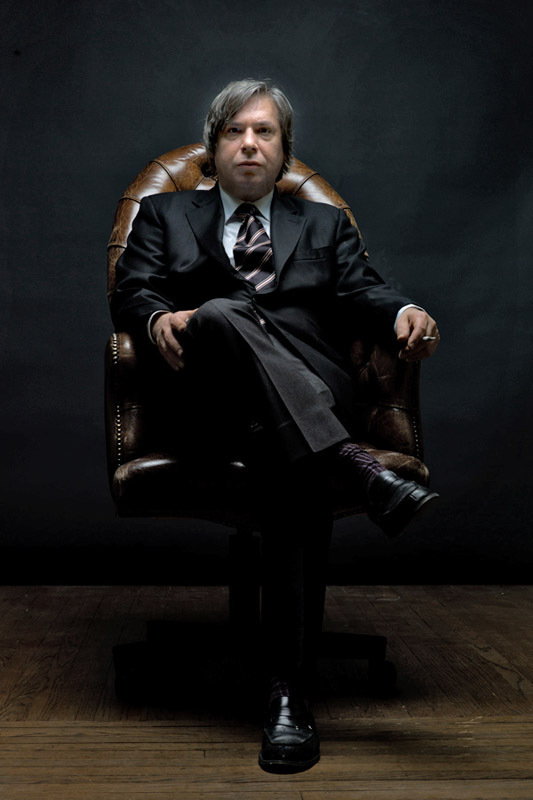
Contemporary visual artist George Condo designed the two cover artworks for "Power", along with the cover of the album My Beautiful Dark Twisted Fantasy.

Despite having several well-known producers on his recording team, the majority of the production featured on "Power" was done by the lesser-known Symbolyc One. The song was primarily produced by him and was initially intended to be given to rapper Rhymefest, until West listened to the song and expressed interest in using the beat himself. According to Symbolyc One, West was an admirer of the composition, and asked him to fly down to Hawaii, where he discovered that West had already recorded some of his version of the song. A month later, the producer was asked to return to Hawaii and discovered that the beat had been further modified by West, who added "polish" to the track. Symbolyc One expressed surprise that West was so interested in using the beat, since the song features drums reminiscent of a song from West's Late Registration entitled "Crack Music". S1 would later state that tons of verses didn't make the final cut, as well as there being 8 or 9 different versions of the song itself.

In an outtake from the 2012 documentary Something from Nothing: The Art of Rap directed by rapper Ice-T, West mused that he had never actually written down his lyrics before, and that "Power" represented a turning point in his songwriting process:

I didn't write my raps down for my first four albums—like at all, I did it from the head straight to the booth. But on this last album, My Beautiful Dark Twisted Fantasy, I wrote it. I really put myself in the zone that my life was dependent on the success of this album. With that being the case, I said, 'You know what? No matter what anybody says about me, they won't—I can write something that can make someone that hates me the most have to really respect or love the song.' So even a song like 'Power,' I spent 5,000 hours writing it, and it's really the psychology behind the lyrics; it's not just blatantly, 'I've got all the power'—'No one man should have all that power.' It's worded it in a really sensitive way that opens it up for everyone. Even if I use first person and say 'I, I, I,' it's always for everyone.

West also declared influence from his previous singles "Stronger" and "Good Life" from his third album Graduation, stating that the track was meant to be inspirational for the listener. According to West, he wanted his music to be appealing in an economy facing a recession. On June 30, 2010, the single was released on iTunes for digital download. The cover art work for "Power" was produced by American visual artist George Condo, who also designed the artwork for My Beautiful Dark Twisted Fantasy. The artwork depicts a decapitated bleeding head wearing a crown, pierced with a sword through it. The single had two other alternate cover designs, both produced by Condo. A second one was released featuring a depiction of West with a gaping, demented mouth. In a January 2020 interview with GQ, West claimed that "Power" was his weakest first single to ever be released because he "felt like it was bowing to the expectations". West explained, viewing the track as "the ultimate Kanye West song" but claiming that it was a mix of his previous works, rather than one of his "songs that people never heard before".

== Composition ==
"Power"
The track has been described as "a contemplation on fame and obsolescence that quotes King Crimson's '21st Century Schizoid Man'".

"Power" marked a stylistic return to hip hop for West after the sparse electro of 808s & Heartbreak. It has been described as surreal, frightening, dark, and strange in nature. The production of "Power" centers on samples of "21st Century Schizoid Man" by English progressive rock band King Crimson, "Afromerica" by French disco act Continent Number 6, and "It's Your Thing" by American funk band Cold Grits. The song's production is reinforced with a vocal harmony provided by Dwele, with a line delivery mostly inspired by braggadocio rapping methods. The song has been described as dark thematically and was called "apocalyptic." According to Alex Denney of NME, the track is the first moment of catharsis on My Beautiful Dark Twisted Fantasy, stating that the track made use of "tribal fanfare and supercharged lyrics". He mused that lines like "I guess every superhero need his theme music" appear to be West's imagining of a warm welcome to heaven. Pitchfork Media's Ryan Dombal described West's delivery as urgent, summarizing the production:

More than ever, though, "Power" has Kanye internalizing his multiple minds and coming to an ecstatic peace with them. "Power" is not a bitchfest. It's an exaltation. All of his various guises-- King of the Assholes, drama queen, Red Bull'd 12-year-old, Next Chappelle, strangely relatable Megaman-- are mashed up in this proudly schizoid roll call. Every sound is ready for the arena, and every couplet is ready for the 140 character treatment, including this one: "I don't need yo pussy, bitch, I'm on my own dick / I ain't gotta power trip, who you goin' home with?" He knows the answer, and so do we.

The song takes several influences from previous projects by West and was called a summation of his prior styles. The song takes cues from the militant chants of West's song "Jesus Walks" from his first album The College Dropout, the drum-style of "Crack Music" from West's Late Registration, the inspirational aspect of "Stronger" from Graduation and the atmospheric piano and strings featured on 808s & Heartbreak. The chorus is "simultaneously boastful, condemning, and anxious", and anthemic in nature, featuring a wordless vocal chant. West utilizes a military-inspired, "take-no-prisoner" approach on the song, purposely failing to be apologetic, even going as far as mocking some of his critics. Other topics discussed on the song include social commentary on the state of the United States, and his thoughts on race issues.

The lyrics of the song have been cited as "classic Kanye", featuring many of the traits that have been exhibited in his lyricism in the past. Themes that have defined much of his work, such as egotism, cultural criticism, and personal issues, are featured prominently in the song. West self-described the song as "superhero theme music", with the track darting back from being depressing and bombastic in nature, with the sample occasionally cutting through the song in an abrasive manner. The track seemingly culminates with the suicide of its main character, ending with a menacing laugh provided by West. During an interview with New York radio station Power 105.1, West said he spent thousands of hours working on this carefully crafted song. "A song like 'Power' took 5,000 hours, like literally 5,000 man-hours to do this one record."

== Reception ==
=== Critical response ===
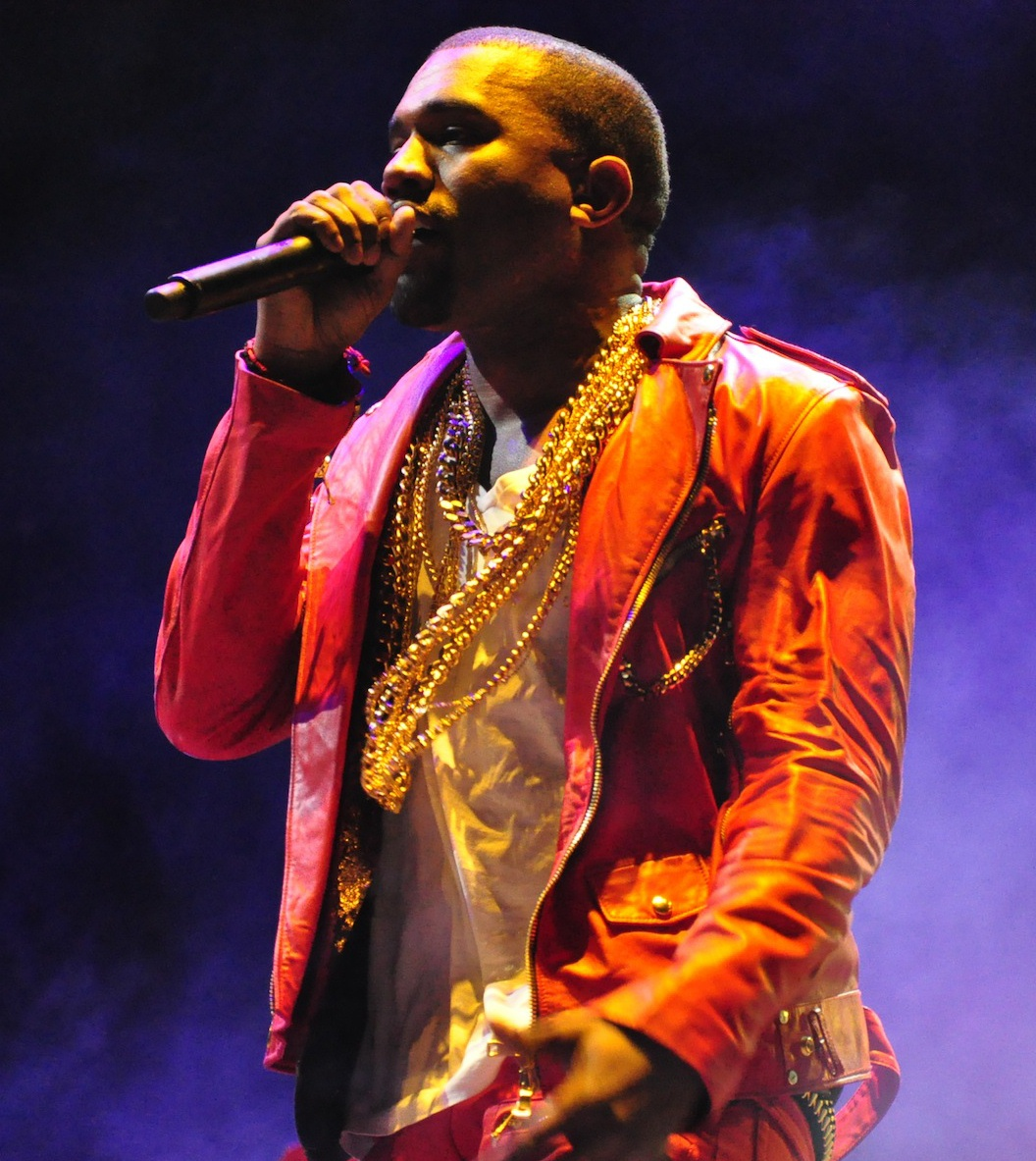
West's "Power" was widely acclaimed by music critics, with Rolling Stone calling it West's best single in years. Several publications named it amongst the best songs of 2010.

"Power" received widespread acclaim from music critics upon release, many calling it West's best single in years. Jon Dolan of Rolling Stone gave a positive review to the song, describing it as West's best single since "Stronger", writing that West "rides a torrid whipsaw beat, as he takes on his spelunking media image, pinballing from self-aware ('I'm an asshole') to defiant ('Kiss my asshole'). The sentiment is classic Kanye, but he hasn't melted down this brilliantly in a long time." Jason Lipshutz from Billboard praised the song, saying, "with its stunning mix of rock-leaning production, memorable rhymes and unadulterated attitude, new single 'Power' is a pissed-off shot of adrenaline that plays upon all of the controversial rapper's strengths. Rhyming over a soulful vocal harmony and an abrasive sample of King Crimson's "21st Century Schizoid Man," West dismisses his doubters, takes a shot at Saturday Night Live and shrugs off his recent hiatus from hip-hop." Ryan Dombal of Pitchfork Media dubbed the track 'Best New Music' in June 2010, and viewed it as an adequate response to West's self-imposed exile and public scrutiny.

Talking about the album version of the song, David Amidon of PopMatters praised the new minor additions featured in the production, musing "from mere sonic details to a litany of background histrionics on guitar that play off of West's delivery throughout," and compared the production favorably to Late Registration. HipHopDX writer Jake Paine felt that one of the best moments of the album occurred early on, during "Power" and that track will likely be the most remembered song "in lyrical circles". Nathan Rabin of The A.V. Club called the track a terrific single, declaring that it "soars to adrenaline-fueled heights on the strength of urgent, stomping percussion-driven, serpentine electric guitar, and a show-stopping sample of King Crimson’s "21st Century Schizoid Man", stating that the song best showcases West's vision on the album. BBC's Stephen Kelly called the song "brilliantly pompous".

Chicago Tribune writer Greg Kot called the song exhilarating in nature, with a furious, layered, percussion beat, praising the song's narrative about a man who "lost in translation with a whole... nation". MT Richards of Slant Magazine stated that "Power" sounded nothing like any hip-hop song of recent memory, going as far as saying that the single signified that West was in a "league of his own." Richards largely praised the song, musing that the "misanthropic 'Power' will surely alienate those longing for another sunny hit like "Hey Mama". At last, West has emerged steely-eyed, bold, and out of his mind." AbsolutePunk's Drew Beringer stated that the track was a classic West song, with the track featuring a "brilliant sample of King Crimson" and infectious hand claps.

The song was also well received by former King Crimson member Greg Lake, the original lead vocalist and bassist on "21st Century Schizoid Man." When asked for his own stance on sampling during an interview with O2 Academy, Lake gave a positive response. He stated, "What I was pleased with was, is the relevance of '21st Century Schizoid Man' today. You know, it still sounds current. It still sounds relevant. That's really gratifying after all of these years. I mean, that record is what—40, 50 years old? I don't know, but very old. Old like me! But it's lovely to hear a really contemporary artist doing it." In an interview with Rolling Stone, Lake further commented, "In a way, that song still sounds modern to me. I think when you hear Kanye West do it, or include it in his own song, it's relevant. He's speaking about that crazy world that we live in. It's as true now as it was then. It's an honor when something like that happens." Due in part to West's usage, "21st Century Schizoid Man" has since become a favorite of Lake, who became known for opening each of his one-man shows during his 2012 Songs of a Lifetime theatre tour by performing the song. Lake went into detail regarding a typical performance of "21st Century Schizoid Man" at his concerts:

It starts with the lights going out and everything is black. The first thing you hear is the Kanye West piece. When the hook comes on, "21st Century Schizoid Man," the spotlight comes on and there's no one on the stage. Then the track carries, but the second time the hook comes, it's me, and me singing it. And I open up with "Schizoid Man." It's a great shocker, but it's a statement too. It's enabled me to link the past with the present.

=== Accolades ===
Pitchfork Media named the song the sixth best song of 2010, with the staff writing "it's all of My Beautiful Dark Twisted Fantasy's pathology and genius in digest form, the vicarious, timeless thrill of hearing a crazy talented person act crazy and talented." Rolling Stone placed the song at position 40 amongst their 50 best tracks of the year. The song was on an unordered list of the 20 best songs of the year by Spin, with critic Charles Aaron musing that "as if he's inciting an Afro-futurist convocation, Kanye creates the theme music for his spectacularly ambivalent "superhero" alter ego." MTV News declared the track the third best of the year, citing it as a definitive single from the album. Time listed the song third in its list of the 10 best songs of the year. Complex magazine listed it as the sixth best of the year, commenting that with "all the great music Kanye released this year, you might have forgotten just how absolutely amazing 'Power' was." In January 2011, The Village Voice's Pazz & Jop annual critics' poll named "Power" the fifth-best song of 2010 to find the best music of that year; West's other singles "Runaway" and "Monster" were ranked at numbers four and six, respectively. Their parent album, My Beautiful Dark Twisted Fantasy was ranked the best album of 2010 on the same poll. NME named it the fourth best song of 2010. The song was named the third best song of 2010 by Spectrum Culture. Pop Matters named it the fifth best song of 2010. Consequence of Sound named "Power" the best song of 2010.

As "Power" was released before the Grammy cutoff date of August, it was the only work by West eligible for Grammy consideration that year, with the rest of the album eligible the following year. The track was nominated for Best Rap Performance at the 53rd Grammy Awards, being West's only Grammy nomination that year. It lost the award to "Not Afraid" by Eminem. Though the album, and its songs, later won three Grammys at the 54th Grammy Awards in 2012. In 2019, The song was included Billboard's "100 Songs That Defined the Decade" list, with writer Bryan Kress' summarising; "the most endearing aspect of "Power" is the hard-earned salvation of Kanye's reputation at a pivotal juncture in his career. At the eve of a new decade with his legacy tarnished and largely unfulfilled, West rewrote the narrative, and changed the course of the music industry as a continually groundbreaking force that could not be stopped." NME named it the sixth best song of the 2010s decade in 2019.

=== Commercial performance ===
While a significant critical success, "Power" performed less well commercially. During the week entering 8 July 2010, "Power" charted on the Billboard Hot 100 at number 22; named as the week's Hot Shot Debut. While the song attained a high debut, the song only remained there for one week, which was also the song's peak. Despite this fall in the charts, the song did eventually go platinum. On 4 September 2010, the single also debuted on the UK Singles Chart and UK R&B Chart at number 36 and 10 respectively, before falling to number 42 on its second week in the chart. It debuted with sales of 6,254 downloads and marked West's 6th singles chart entry in less than six years. On 18 September 2010, the single fell 38 places to number 80, marking its third week within the Top 100. Following the release of the album My Beautiful Dark Twisted Fantasy, the single re-entered the chart at number 57 and as of 23 October 2010 has spent a total of five weeks within the Top 100. In 2011, the single re-entered the UK singles chart and urban chart, at number 38 and 12 respectively.

By 2017, Official Charts Company revealed that "Power" was the 83rd best-selling hip-hop song of all time in the UK. In 2018, Spotify named the song the fourth most popular workout song of all time, while West's "Stronger" was third on the list. As of October 24, 2019, the former ranks as West's seventh most popular track of all time on the UK Singles Chart. As of January 5, 2025, the song has reached 1 billion streams on Spotify.

== Marketing ==
=== Remix ===
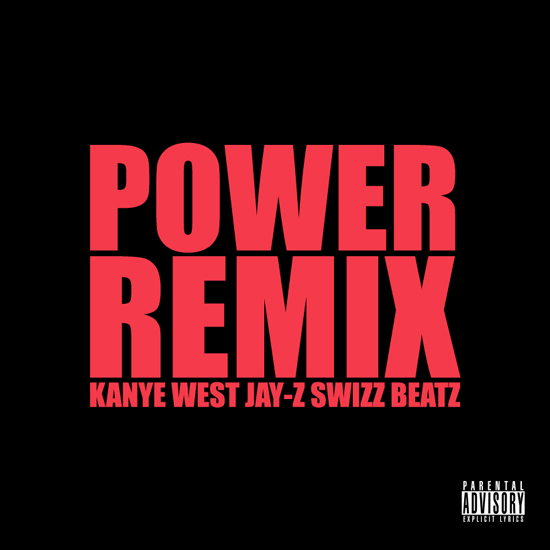
"Power (Remix)" was released as a free single through West's G.O.O.D. Fridays program.

In promotion of West's My Beautiful Dark Twisted Fantasy, he launched GOOD Fridays, a weekly free music giveaway. The intention was to release a free new song every Friday for a few months to promote his album, and the weekly tracks generally featured various rappers from his label, GOOD Music, and other artists he usually collaborated with. A remix of "Power" was the very first GOOD Friday released, and in an interview with Hot 97, West said that the remix was to feature his good friend and rapper Jay-Z. It was originally intended to be released on August 13, 2010, but was premiered on August 20, 2010, on Hot 97 by Funkmaster Flex. The song also features vocals and production from Swizz Beatz and all new verses provided by West. Swizz Beatz produced the second half of the song which samples Snap!'s hip house hit, "The Power." The remix was described as more intricate than an average remix, with Jay-Z discussing the ups and downs of life and referencing Norman Mailer.

=== Live performances ===
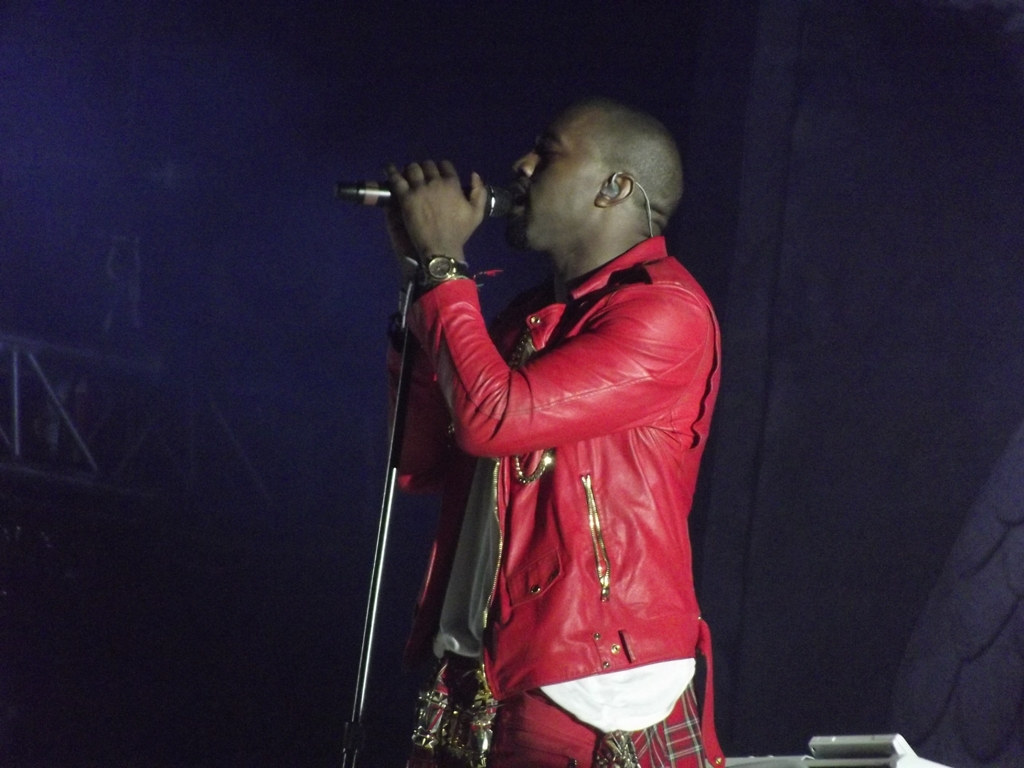
The mostly red outfit worn by West during some performances of "Power"

West debuted "Power" live at the 2010 BET Awards, where he performed the song atop a mountain-like prop, with a video compilation of footage shot on top of a mountain playing in the back. West performed the track on Saturday Night Live on October 2, where he also substituted a verse containing profane language, as well as a diss towards the show itself ("Fuck SNL and the whole cast"), with an entirely new version. For the first time in the show's history, the signature black instrument filled stage gave place to an all-white, backlit canvas.

West's performance was heavily publicized and received positive notices. HitFix's Gregory Ellwood praised the performance, writing "note to Lorne Michaels: whatever West had to do to let you break form and come up with such a visually stunning and impressive performance was well, well worth it. This is memorable television. Hands down." E! Online's Megan Masters mused that "West's SNL performance proved once again that no matter what's going on in his personal life, he is an artist and will continue to take chances in the music industry—ultimately breaking new ground," adding that "Kanye West is a comeback king". Kevin O'Donnell of Spin wrote that West delivered one of the show's "most unique performances of all-time". West performed the song in an entirely red outfit.

West also performed the track live at the EMAs 2010, in Madrid, during Thirty Seconds to Mars's performance of their song "Hurricane", which also features a verse by West. The remixed version of the song were performed by West and Jay-Z during their Watch the Throne Tour. The remixed version was performed at Jay-Z's and Eminem's "Home & Home" concert in the new Yankee Stadium, during Jay-Z portion of the performance. West joined Jay-Z on stage and also performed single "Monster". During his set at the 2011 Coachella Valley Music and Arts Festival, West performed "Power" during the start of the performance. West's performance was described as "one of the most memorable performances in Coachella history." Matthew Perpetua of Rolling Stone noted that "with its stomping beat and chanted chorus, 'Power'—one of West's most grandiose songs anyway—was an early highlight of his show." When performing with a choir at the festival in 2019, West directed the choir through a re-make of the song that praised God's capacity.

== Music video ==
A screenshot of the music video

The New York Times previewed a clip of the music video directed by artist Marco Brambilla, featuring Irina Shayk, Jessica White and African-American albino fashion model Diandra Forrest. The video premiered on MTV on August 5, 2010, preceding a new episode of Jersey Shore. The "Power" video commences with a portrait-view headshot of West staring intensely into the camera with illuminated eyes and wearing a large, low-hanging gold chain necklace with an equally large pendant of Horus.

As the music begins, the camera slowly tracks out in one continuous take to reveal West standing at the end of a hallway of black columns, and surrounded by partially dressed female characters. Some kneel before him, some embrace, four figures wear ibex-like horns; and some are inverted, pouring water that flows upward. Two horned, staff-bearing figures, loosely resembling interpretations of Isis and Hathor, stand on either side of West; each slowly strikes the ground with their staff, in time to the music. The Sword of Damocles hangs over the rapper's head, while other slowly moving figures appear ready to strike West with blades. The various figures within the painting are presented in poses similar to the Major Arcana and Minor Arcana of the Etteilla occult tarot deck. Anthony Beningo of Daily News described the ending of the video:

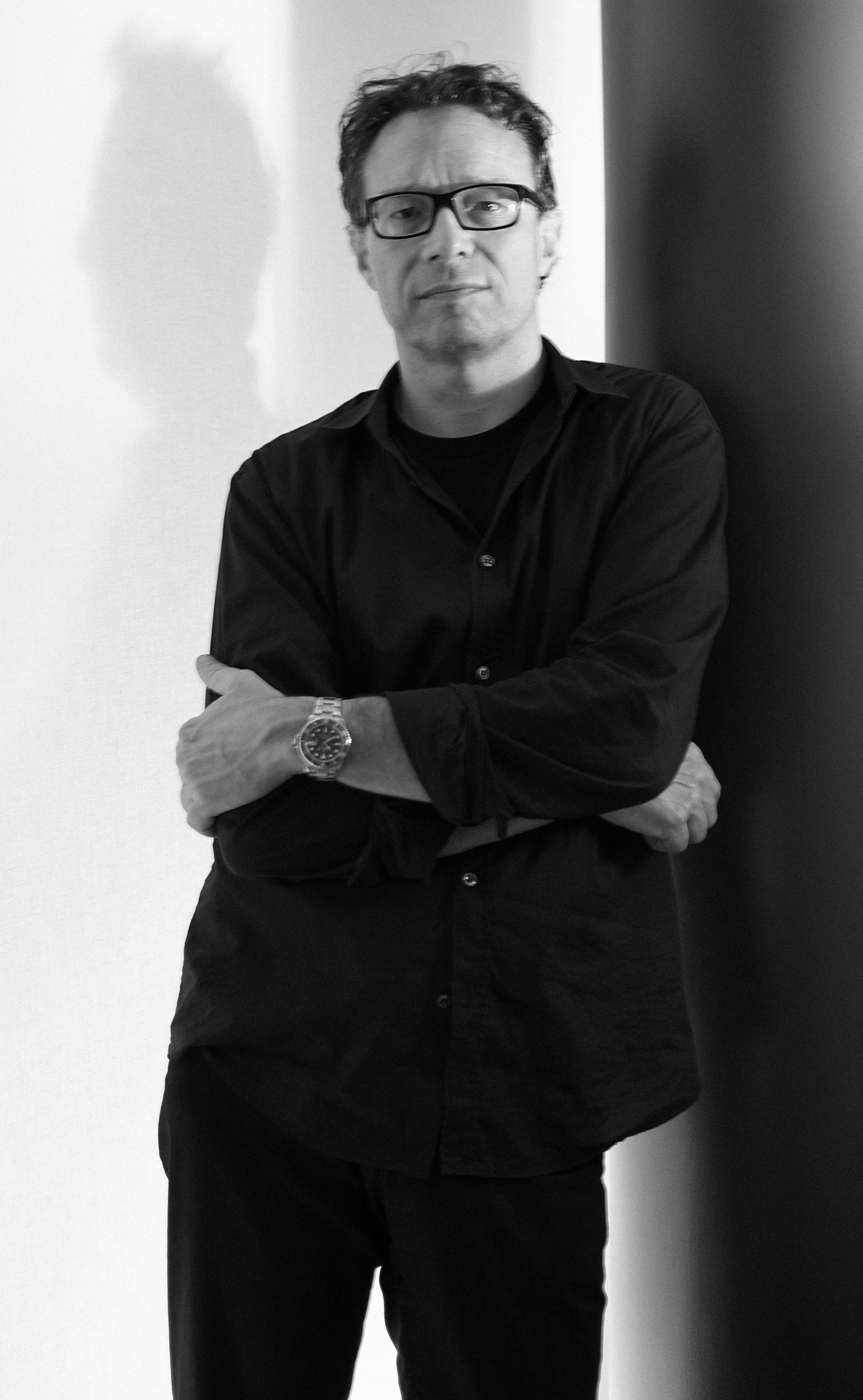
Music video director Marco Brambilla described his "Power" video as personal and apocalyptic in nature, stating that the video exaggerated the message of the song.

"The focus of the video turns out to be West's death. After a few close-up shots of the rapper's surroundings, Brambilla's camera pulls back and everyone disappears, leaving only West and the two warriors. Realization dawns that they aren't swinging at each other, but rather converging on King Kanye. But before they can decapitate him, however, the video cuts to black."

West has called the video a "moving painting." Brambilla mused about the video that "it's kind of apocalyptic, in a very personal way," and that "it's a very exaggerated hyper-sensational version of what the song is saying". The video is much shorter than the actual song, lasting less than two minutes and only covering the first verse. It was later revealed that the 103-second video, which invokes cultural references from the Renaissance period to Greek mythology, is a teaser for a longer clip, though the full-length version of the video never surfaced. One of the reasons proposed why the full version never was released was because "Power" was also used during Runaway, a 35-minute music video directed by West set to music from My Beautiful Dark Twisted Fantasy.

=== Reception ===
MTV Buzzworthy's Chris Ryan gave a positive review of the video, stating that it "marks a change in the way we look at music videos as a medium—it's less a music video, more a modern art montage with a heavy dose of ancient Egyptian imagery and possible references to Michelangelo's "The Creation of Adam" (with a fair Kanye-esque helping of chesty females). In it, Kanye West ironically builds an unattainable artistic empire fit for a king (or pharaoh), while condemning the role power plays in our lives. So much to think about." Beningo of Daily News compared the video to the work of Michael Jackson, calling it an event of a video. Hitfix's Katie Hasty mused that West "put on a crown for 'Jesus Walks,' so it was only a matter of time before he ascended into heaven," describing the video as a "little weird, a little funny." The video for "Power" earned multiple nominations; Best Special Effects and Best Art Direction at the 2011 MTV Video Music Awards, Best Visual Effects and Best Urban Video at the 2010 UK Music Video Awards., along with Best Hip-Hop Video at the 2011 MTV Video Music Aid Japan. NME named it the second best music video of 2010. Rolling Stone listed it among the ten best music videos of 2010.

== Lawsuit ==
In 2022, Declan Colgan Music Ltd, the owners of the mechanical license for "21st Century Schizoid Man", filed a lawsuit against UMG, claiming that West had sampled it in "Power" without an appropriate license. They claimed that they had been underpaid in royalties by UMG. The case was settled in May 2024.

== Personnel ==
- Produced by S1 and Kanye West
- Additional Production by Jeff Bhasker and Mike Dean
- Recorded by Andrew Dawson, Anthony Kilhoffer and Mike Dean at the Avex Recording Studio, Honolulu
- Engineered by Ken Lewis and Brent Kolatalo
- Mixed by Manny Marroquin at Larrabee Studios, LA
- Assistant Mix Engineers: Christian Plata and Erik Madrid
- Chant Vocals: Alvin Fields and Ken Lewis
- Handclaps by Ian Allen, Wilson Christopher, Uri Djemal and Chris Soper
- Keyboards: Jeff Bhasker and Mike Dean
- Guitar and Bass: Mike Dean
- Cello: Chris "Hitchcock" Chorney
- Additional Vocals: Dwele

== Media usage ==
- "Power" was used in a hip-hop routine on the hit dance show So You Think You Can Dance in its seventh season.
- Professional skateboarder Paul Rodriguez used the song for his 2010 Plan B Skateboards solo skate video Me, Myself & I.
- The song appeared in promotional trailers for 2010 film The Social Network.
- "Power" appeared in the trailer for 2011 film Limitless.
- The song was used in TV spots for the 2015 reboot of Fantastic Four.
- "Power" was featured in the trailer for 2013 crime drama film Broken City.
- It was featured in an episode of Gossip Girl entitled "Goodbye, Columbia."
- The single was featured in the video game Saints Row: The Third. It appeared in the single-player campaign and in-game radio stations, as well as its soundtrack, end credits, and a trailer.
- The song was utilized in the official trailer for Forza Motorsport 4.
- The track was used in the pilot episode of Hit the Floor on VH1.
- Texas A&M University uses "Power" as their football team's intro music.
- Creighton University uses "Power" at the beginning of their men's basketball games.
- Iowa State University uses "Power" as their football team's intro music.
- American Airlines used the song in a 2013 commercial titled: "New Plane Smell".
- ITV News used "Power" in their promotional campaigns for their coverage of the 2015 general election.
- The song was used in a TV spot for the BBC One show Ripper Street.
- "Power" was used as the backdrop to a bumper for The Daily Show featuring its new host, Trevor Noah.
- Paco Rabanne's Invictus and Olympea fragrance television commercials featured the song.
- The 2017 film Power Rangers used the song in its trailer, as well as during a scene in the movie.
- It was featured in a scene on UK reality TV series Love Island during season 3, episode 33.
- "Power" was used in an Xbox One X TV commercial entitled "Feel True Power".
- An orchestral cover of "Power" was used in the second trailer for 2017 film All the Money in the World.
- The song was used in a scene of 2013 film The Bling Ring, and appeared on its soundtrack.
- "Power" was featured in a 2019 Ford Mustang Mach-E European ad campaign, entitled: Ford: Bring on Tomorrow.
- English association football team A.F.C. Bournemouth use the song during their pre-match routine.
- The song served as Pittsburgh Pirates Kevin Newman's at-bat tune.
- "Power" was featured in a scene of the 2022 superhero film Black Adam.

== Charts ==
=== Weekly charts ===
Chart (2010)	Peak position
Australia (ARIA)	100
Belgium (Ultratip Bubbling Under Flanders)	38
Canada Hot 100 (Billboard)	49
Germany (German Black Charts)	4
Ireland (IRMA)	30
Mexico Ingles Airplay (Billboard)	21
UK Hip Hop/R&B (Official Charts)	10
UK Singles (Official Charts)	36
US Billboard Hot 100	22
US Hot R&B/Hip-Hop Songs (Billboard)	22
US Hot Rap Songs (Billboard)	14

Chart (2011)	Peak position
Scotland (Official Charts Company)	39
UK Singles (Official Charts Company)	38
UK R&B (Official Charts Company)	12

Chart (2013)	Peak position
France (SNEP)	137

=== Year-end charts ===
Chart (2010)	Position
US Hot R&B/Hip-Hop Songs (Billboard)	90

== Certifications ==
Region	Certification	Certified units/sales
Brazil (Pro-Música Brasil)	Platinum	60,000^{‡}
Denmark (IFPI Danmark)	Platinum	90,000^{‡}
Germany (BVMI)	Platinum	300,000^{‡}
Italy (FIMI)	Gold	25,000^{‡}
New Zealand (RMNZ)	3× Platinum	90,000^{‡}
Spain (Promusicae)	Gold	30,000^{‡}
United Kingdom (BPI)	2× Platinum	1,200,000^{‡}
United States (RIAA)	6× Platinum	6,000,000^{‡}
^{‡} Sales+streaming figures based on certification alone.

== Release history ==
Region	Date	Format
United States	May 28, 2010	Radio premiere
United States	July 1, 2010	Digital download
United Kingdom	August 29, 2010	Digital download
United Kingdom	October 30, 2010	Digital Download
