= Shit's Real =

Single by Mic Geronimo

from the album The Natural
- B-side: "Hemmin Heads"
- Released: 1993; June 10, 1994 (reissue)
- Recorded: 1993
- Genre: Hip hop
- Length: 3:59
- Label: Mic Geronimo; TVT (reissue)
- Songwriters: Michael McDermon, Irving Lorenzo
- Producer: DJ Irv

Mic Geronimo singles chronology
"Shit's Real" (1993)	"Masta I.C." (1995)

"Shit's Real", also known by its censored title "It's Real", is the first single released by rapper Mic Geronimo. It appears on his debut studio album The Natural (1995).

== Background and composition ==
Produced by a then-unknown DJ Irv (later known as Irv Gotti), "Shit's Real" was the first song Mic Geronimo ever recorded. After meeting Irv at a high school talent show, Geronimo and Irv came together to record a single, which became "Shit's Real". The song uses a looped sample of "Free" by Deniece Williams, and finds Mic Geronimo rapping about his daily routine. Gotti makes a cameo appearance in the song's video.

The single became an underground classic and made it to three different Billboard charts including 23 on the Hot Rap Singles chart when TVT picked it up in 1994 following its street buzz the previous year. After Geronimo was approved an album budget by TVT, "Shit's Real" was included on his debut The Natural.

== Track listing ==
=== A-side ===
1. "Shit's Real" (Vocal Mix) – 3:59
2. "Shit's Real" (Radio Mix) – 3:54
3. "Shit's Real" (Instrumental Mix) – 3:54
4. "Shit's Real" (Yeah Version) – 3:59

=== B-side ===
1. "Hemmin Heads" (Vocal Mix)- 4:56
2. "Hemmin Heads" (Radio Mix) – 4:56
3. "Hemmin Heads" (Instrumental Mix) – 4:56
4. "Hemmin Heads" (Cheeba Version) – 4:48

=== A-side ===
1. "Shit's Real" – 3:59
2. "Hemmin Heads" – 4:56
3. "Shit's Real" (instrumental) – 3:54
4. "Hemmin Heads" (instrumental) – 4:56

=== B-side ===
1. "It's Real"- 3:55
2. "Hemmin Heads" (radio version) – 4:56
3. "Hemmin Heads" (Cheeba version) – 4:48
4. "Shit's Real" (a cappella) – 3:55

== Charts ==
Chart (1994)	Peak position
Billboard Hot R&B/Hip-Hop Singles & Tracks	89
Billboard Hot Rap Singles	23
Billboard Hot Dance Music/Maxi-Singles Sales	43
