= The Natural (Mic Geronimo album) =

Studio album by Mic Geronimo
- Released: November 28, 1995
- Recorded: 1993–95
- Studios: D&D; Sony; Homeboy; Diner Dog; Ghetto Lab (New York City); Reflections (Charlotte, North Carolina)
- Genre: Hip hop
- Length: 52:52
- Labels: Blunt, TVT
- Producers: Buckwild; Chyskillz; Da Beatminerz; Irv Gotti; Mark Sparks; Nashiem Myrick

Mic Geronimo chronology
The Natural (1995)	Vendetta (1997)

Singles from The Natural
- 1. "Shit's Real" Released: 1993 June 10, 1994 (reissue); 2. "Masta I.C." Released: March 21, 1995; 3. "The Natural" Released: July 16, 1995; 4. "Wherever You Are" Released: April 23, 1996

Professional ratings
Review scores
Source	Rating
AllMusic	4/5 stars
Muzik	4/5 stars
The Source	3.5/5 stars

The Natural is the debut studio album by American rapper Mic Geronimo. It was released on November 28, 1995, via Blunt Recordings/TVT Records. The album was produced by Mark Sparks, Buckwild, Irv Gotti, Da Beatminerz, and Chyskillz. It features guest appearances from Royal Flush, Murder Inc., O.C., and the Lost Boyz. It peaked at number 144 on the Billboard 200. The album spawned four singles: "Shit's Real", "Masta I.C.", "The Natural" and "Wherever You Are".

== Release ==
"Masta I.C." was produced and co-written by Diggin' in the Crates member Buckwild, with Royal Flush contributing guest vocals and X-Ecutioners member Roc Raida providing scratches for the song. It peaked in 1995 charts at number 30 on the Billboard's Hot Rap Singles and at number 48 on Billboard Hot Dance Music/Maxi-Singles Sales. Its music video was directed by Hype Williams. Ja Rule and Irv Gotti made cameo appearances in the video. The official remix was produced by Irv Gotti and featured verses from Royal Flush and the Lost Boyz, it was the last track on The Natural. The B-Side of the single was "Time to Build", which featured guest appearances by then unknown DMX, Jay-Z and Ja Rule, each of whom would become multi-platinum superstars shortly after.

"The Natural" was produced by Mark Sparks and featured Royal Flush. It peaked in 1995 charts at number 42 on Billboard Hot Rap Singles and at number 28 on Billboard Hot Dance Music/Maxi-Singles Sales.

"Wherever You Are" is produced by Mark Sparks. It peaked in 1996 at 43 on the Hot Rap Singles and at number 42 on Billboard Hot Dance Music/Maxi-Singles Sales. It was sampled in American electronica musician Moby's 2003 single "Jam for the Ladies".

== Track listing ==
No.	Title	Producer(s)	Length
1.	"The Natural" (featuring Royal Flush)	Mark Sparks	3:12
2.	"Lifecheck"	Da Beatminerz	4:04
3.	"Wherever You Are"	Mark Sparks	4:04
4.	"Masta I.C." (featuring Royal Flush)	Buckwild	4:16
5.	"Man of My Own" (featuring Royal Flush)	Chyskillz	3:57
6.	"Time to Build" (featuring DMX, Ja Rule and Jay-Z)	DJ Irv	4:21
7.	"Shit's Real"	DJ Irv	4:26
8.	"Three Stories High" (featuring Royal Flush)	Buckwild	3:22
9.	"Sharane"	Mark Sparks	3:15
10.	"Men Vs. Many" (featuring O.C. and Royal Flush)	Da Beatminerz	4:17
11.	"Train of Thought"	Buckwild	3:52
12.	"Things Change" (featuring Royal Flush)	Mark Sparks	3:48
13.	"Masta I.C. (Remix)" (featuring Lost Boyz and Royal Flush)	Nashiem Myrick	5:58
Total length:			52:52

Sample credits

- Track 3 contains elements of "Night Crawler" by Bob James.

== Charts ==
Chart (1995)	Peak position
US Billboard 200	144
US Top R&B/Hip-Hop Albums (Billboard)	23
US Heatseekers Albums (Billboard)	15
