= Live Fast, Die Young (song) =

Single by Rick Ross featuring Kanye West

from the album Teflon Don
- Released: July 13, 2010
- Recorded: February 1 - March 10, 2010
- Genre: Hip hop
- Length: 6:13
- Label: Maybach Music Group; Slip-n-Slide; Def Jam
- Songwriters: William Leonard Roberts II; Frederick Knight; Marvin Gaye; Kanye West
- Producer: Kanye West

Rick Ross singles chronology
"B.M.F. (Blowin' Money Fast)" (2010)	"Live Fast, Die Young" (2010)	"Rap Song" (2010)

Kanye West singles chronology
"Power" (2010)	"Live Fast, Die Young" (2010)	"Erase Me" (2010)

"Live Fast, Die Young" is the third single by American rapper Rick Ross from his fourth studio album Teflon Don (2010). It features Kanye West, who also stood as the sole producer. The song samples three tracks in its composition. A music video was announced by Ross, but never saw an official release.

== Background and recording ==
"Live Fast, Die Young" was originally conceived by Kanye West as a song for his fifth studio album My Beautiful Dark Twisted Fantasy (2010) (known at the time under the working title Good Ass Job), with the name "Hard Horn Nightmare". In early 2010, during a visit to New York City, West played early versions of "Live Fast, Die Young" and four other songs intended for the album to Complex journalist Noah Callahan-Bever, which had been recorded during sessions in Honolulu, Hawaii. However, "Live Fast, Die Young" would ultimately be given to Rick Ross.

The song contains a prominent sample of "If This World Were Mine" by The Bar-Kays. West told MTV News in October 2010 that he had spent three days listening to CDs before coming across "If This World Were Mine" and the section he wanted to sample; he claimed to have loved the sample so much that he spent the next two days playing it over and over again whilst deciding how to remake it into a song of his own. West further explained how he chose to develop the sample into what became "Live Fast, Die Young":

...I thought about it and said, 'Claps. I want handclaps to go with this sample. That's what I need to juxtapose it and not make it just some takeoff of a '94 hip-hop song, but to make it a 2010, 2011, 2012 futuristic version of itself.' And I started the claps and put the 'hey, hey, hey' and the drums, and I just programmed it."

== Composition ==
The track samples a total of three songs. The songs sampled are: "If This World Were Mine" by The Bar-Kays, "Uphill Peace Of Mind" by Kid Dynamite and "Funky President (People It's Bad)" by James Brown. It was viewed by Phil Miter of Noisey Vice as being among West's 2010 productions that: 'depict unreal wealth and power in the process of decay, melting into unrecognizable, disturbing shapes'.

== Release ==
The song leaked online on July 1, 2010, twelve days before being released as a single. On July 21, Ross announced that the music video would be directed by Hype Williams, but the video was never officially released. Roddy Ricch and Ty Dolla Sign covered this song's chorus in Ricch's 2021 release "llf".

== Commercial performance ==
"Live Fast, Die Young" debuted at number 89 on the US Billboard Hot R&B/Hip-Hop Songs on the week of its release as a single.

== Charts ==
Chart (2010)	Peak position
US Hot R&B/Hip-Hop Songs (Billboard)	89

== Release history ==
Region	Date	Format	Label	Ref.
United States	July 13, 2010	Rhythmic crossover radio	Maybach Music Group; Slip-n-Slide; Def Jam	
